= 2018–19 Dundee United F.C. season =

Dundee United
2018–19 season
- Chairman: Mike Martin (Until 19 December); Mark Ogren (From 19 December)
- Manager: Csaba László (Until 30 September); Robbie Neilson (From 8 October)
- Stadium: Tannadice Park
- Championship: 2nd
- Premiership play-off: Runners-up
- Scottish Cup: Quarter-finals
- League Cup: Group stage
- Challenge Cup: Second round
- Top goalscorer: League: Pavol Šafranko (12 goals); All: Nicky Clark; Pavol Šafranko (15 each)
- Highest home attendance: 11,062 vs St Mirren, Premiership play-off, 23 May 2019
- Lowest home attendance: 700 vs St Johnstone B, Challenge Cup, 15 August 2018
- Average home league attendance: 5,078
Home colours	Away colours

The 2018–19 season was Dundee United's 110th season, having been founded as Dundee Hibernian in 1909. It was their third season in the Scottish Championship, having been relegated from the Scottish Premiership at the end of the 2015–16 season. United also competed in the Challenge Cup, League Cup and Scottish Cup.

== Summary ==
=== Management ===
United began the season under the management of Csaba László, who had signed an 18–month contract the previous season. On 30 September 2018, following a 5–1 home defeat to promotion rivals Ross County, László left his position as manager by way of “mutual agreement". On 8 October, former Hearts manager Robbie Neilson was appointed as United's new head coach. His first match in charge was a 2–1 victory away to Partick Thistle and Neilson stated that he felt he could replicate his success at Hearts and lead Dundee United back to the Scottish Premiership.

== Results and fixtures ==
Win Draw Loss Postponed

=== Scottish Championship ===
4 August 2018 1	Dundee United	2–3	Dunfermline Athletic	Dundee
15:00 BST	Clark 44'; Aird 89'	BBC Sport report	Thomson 59'; J. Longridge 67'; L. Longridge 84'	Stadium: Tannadice; Attendance: 6,532; Referee: Collum

11 August 2018 2	Queen of the South	1–2	Dundee United	Dumfries
15:00 BST	Dobbie 67'	QOSFC Report; BBC Sport Report; Arabs Photos	Stanton 15'; Šafranko 27'	Stadium: Palmerston Park; Attendance: 1,960; Referee: Kirkland

25 August 2018 3	Dundee United	3–1	Partick Thistle	Dundee
	Watson 6', (yellow card) 63', (goal) 78'; Curran 86'; Robson (yellow card) 90'	Report	Storer (yellow card) 53'; Storey (yellow card) 34'; Erskine 90+2'	Stadium: Tannadice; Attendance: 5,219; Referee: David Munro

1 September 2018 4	Alloa Athletic	1–1	Dundee United	Alloa
	Hetherington (yellow card) 51'; Flannigan 82'	Report	Curran (yellow card) 56'; Watson 71'; Murdoch (yellow card) 74'; Frans (yellow card) 86'	Stadium: Recreation Park; Attendance: 1,616; Referee: Alan Muir

15 September 2018 5	Dundee United	1–1	Greenock Morton	Dundee
	Bouhenna (yellow card) 11'; Barton (yellow card) 57'; Rabitsch (yellow card) 69'; Fyvie 90+3'	Report	Tidser 11' (pen.), (yellow card) 90+1'; MacLean (yellow card) 41'; Kilday (yellow card) 45'	Stadium: Tannadice; Attendance: 4,594; Referee: Colin Steven

22 September 2018 6	Falkirk	0–2	Dundee United	Falkirk
		Report	Safranko 59'; Curran 86'	Stadium: Falkirk Stadium; Attendance: 4,933; Referee: Alan Muir

29 September 2018 7	Dundee United	1–5	Ross County	Dundee
15:00 BST	Safranko 17'; Curran (yellow card) 37'; Murdoch (red card) 59'		McKay 11', 29', 51'; Morris (yellow card) 20'; Watson (yellow card) 34'; Kelly 42'; Mullin 50'	Stadium: Tannadice Park; Attendance: 4,446; Referee: John Beaton

6 October 2018 8	Ayr United	2–0	Dundee United	Ayr
	Shankland 21'; Harvie (yellow card) 30'; Murdoch (yellow card) 64'; McDaid 74'; Geggan (yellow card) 90+3'	Report	Bouhenna (yellow card) 74'	Stadium: Somerset Park; Attendance: 2,621; Referee: Greg Aitken

13 October 2018 9	Partick Thistle	1–2	Dundee United	Glasgow
	Slater (yellow card) 24'; Quitongo (yellow card) 68', (goal) 77'; Penrice (yellow card) 73'; McCarthy (yellow card) 78'; Bannigan (yellow card) 86'	Report	Aird 45'; Safranko 48'; Curran (yellow card) 80'	Stadium: Firhill Stadium; Attendance: 3,087; Referee: William Collum

20 October 2018 10	Dundee United	1–1	Inverness Caledonian Thistle	Dundee
15:00 BST	Safranko 55'	Report	White 72'; Donaldson (yellow card) 82' (yellow-red card)	Stadium: Tannadice Stadium; Attendance: 5,628; Referee: Anderson

27 October 2018 11	Dunfermline Athletic	0–2	Dundee United	Dunfermline
15:00 BST	El Bakhtaoui (yellow card) 25'	Report	McMullan 24'; Frans (yellow card) 43'; Bouhenna (yellow card) 46'; King 60'; Clark (yellow card) 63'; Stanton (yellow card) 82'; Fyvie (yellow card) 90+2'	Stadium: East End Park; Attendance: 6,349; Referee: Steven Kirkland

3 November 2018 12	Dundee United	2–0	Queen of the South	Dundee
15:00 GMT	Šafranko 3' (yellow card) 38'; Doyle 81' (o.g.)	Report	Mercer (yellow card) 35'; Doyle (yellow card) 54'; Norman Jr. (yellow card) 71'; Jacobs (yellow card) 90'	Stadium: Tannadice Park; Attendance: 5,171; Referee: Craig Thomson

10 November 2018 13	Ross County	0–1	Dundee United	Dingwall
15:00 GMT	Mullin (yellow card) 36'; Kelly (yellow card) 39'	Report	Watson 15'; McMullan (yellow card) 21'; Fyvie (yellow card) 60'; Murdoch (yellow card) 90+6'; Rabitsch (yellow card) 90+6'	Stadium: Victoria Park; Attendance: 4,565; Referee: Alan Newlands

20 November 2018 14	Dundee United	4–2	Alloa Athletic	Dundee
19:45 GMT	Clark 19'; Šafranko 21'; Aird 35'; Curran 85'	Report	Trouten 17' (pen.), (yellow card) 61'; Robertson (yellow card) 21'; Flannigan 38'; Hetherington (yellow card) 40'; Graham (yellow card) 51'; Trouten (yellow card) 61'	Stadium: Tannadice Park; Attendance: 4,201; Referee: Steven Kirkland

30 November 2018 15	Dundee United	0–5	Ayr United	Dundee
19:45 GMT		Report	Shankland 3', 41', 87' (pen.), 89'; Moffat 78'	Stadium: Tannadice Park; Attendance: 6,097; Referee: Don Robertson

8 December 2018 16	Greenock Morton	1–1	Dundee United	Greenock
	Tumilty (yellow card) 23'; Buchanan 78'	Report	Frans 31'; Fyvie (yellow card) 42'	Stadium: Cappielow Park; Attendance: 1,916; Referee: David Munro

15 December 2018 17	Inverness Caledonian Thistle	1–1	Dundee United	Inverness
15:00	Walsh 18'; McKay (yellow card) 80'	Report	Bouhenna (yellow card) 29'; King 76'	Stadium: Tulloch Caledonian Stadium; Attendance: 2,464; Referee: Willie Collum

22 December 2018 18	Dundee United	2–1	Falkirk	Dundee
19:45 GMT	Stanton 22', (yellow card) 65'; Šafranko 53', (yellow card) 64'; Curran (yellow card) 90+3'	Report	Rudden (yellow card) 33'; Haber (yellow card) 48'; Buaben (yellow card) 58'; Paton (red card) 65'; Sammut (yellow card) 70'; Muirhead (yellow card) 78', (goal) 90+2' (pen.); Harrison (yellow card) 90+4'	Stadium: Tannadice Park; Attendance: 5,267; Referee: Steven Kirkland

29 December 2018 19	Alloa Athletic	2–1	Dundee United	Alloa
	Roscoe (yellow card) 59'; Graham 73'; Zanatta 89', (yellow card) 90'	Report	Booth 60'; Murdoch (yellow card) 81'; Bouhenna (yellow card) 83'	Stadium: Recreation Park; Attendance: 1,859; Referee: Greg Aitken

5 January 2019 20	Dundee United	1–1	Partick Thistle	Dundee
	Booth (yellow card) 48'; Fyvie 59' (pen.)	Report	Doolan 9'; Cardle (yellow card) 90+1'; Spittal (yellow card) 90+2'	Stadium: Tannadice Park; Attendance: 5,282; Referee: Bobby Madden

12 January 2019 21	Dundee United	1–0	Dunfermline	Dundee
	Frans (yellow card) 41'; Clark 81'	Report	Hippolyte (yellow card) 77'	Stadium: Tannadice Park; Attendance: 5,913; Referee: Alan Muir

25 January 2019 22	Ayr United	1–0	Dundee United	Ayr
	Moore 4'; Rose (yellow card) 28'; Smith (yellow card) 44'; Moffat (yellow card) 90+2'	Report	Gomis (yellow card) 51' (yellow-red card) 89'	Stadium: Somerset Park; Attendance: 2,232; Referee: Don Robertson

2 February 2019 23	Dundee United	2–1	Greenock Morton	Dundee
	Šafranko 8'; Pawlett 29'; Reynolds (yellow card) 80'	Report	McHugh 73'; Waddell (yellow card) 83'; Buchanan (yellow card) 87'	Stadium: Tannadice Park; Attendance: 4,902; Referee: Gavin Ross

16 February 2019 24	Queen of the South	0–1	Dundee United	Dumfries
15:00 GMT	Maguire (red card) 40'	Report	Clark 40' (pen.)	Stadium: Palmerston Park; Attendance: 2,012; Referee: Andrew Dallas

23 February 2019 25	Falkirk	1–1	Dundee United	Falkirk
15:00 GMT	McKenna 84'; McGhee (yellow card) 35'; Paton (yellow card) 79'	Report	Butcher (yellow card) 42'; Harkes (yellow card) 45'; C. Smith 49'; Sow (yellow card) 82'	Stadium: Falkirk Stadium; Attendance: 5,840; Referee: Greg Aitken

26 February 2019 26	Dundee United	1–0	Inverness Caledonian Thistle	Dundee
	Connolly (yellow card) 32'; Pawlett (yellow card) 48' (yellow-red card) 72'; Clark 68' (pen.); Šafranko (yellow card) 82'	Report	McHattie (yellow card) 17'; Rooney (yellow card) 47'	Stadium: Tannadice Stadium; Attendance: 4,737; Referee: Barry Cook

9 March 2019 27	Partick Thistle	2–1	Dundee United	Maryhill
15:00	McDonald 4'; Penrice (yellow card) 32'; Elliott (yellow card) 43'; McMillan (yellow card) 75'; Fitzpatrick 90', (yellow card) 90+1'	Report	Connolly (yellow card) 56'; Stanton (yellow card) 72'; Clark 76'	Stadium: Firhill Stadium; Attendance: 3,173; Referee: Alan Newlands

19 March 2019 28	Dundee United	1–0	Ross County	Dundee
19:45	Butcher 7'; Connolly (yellow card) 29'; Clark (yellow card) 90'	Report	Stewart (yellow card) 11'; Lindsay (yellow card) 90'	Stadium: Tannadice Park; Attendance: 4,290; Referee: Willie Collum

23 March 2019 29	Dundee United	2–1	Alloa Athletic	Dundee
15:00	Taggart 27' (o.g.); Bouhenna (yellow card) 53'; Robson (yellow card) 82'; Clark 83'; Seaman (yellow card) 90'	Report	Kirkpatrick 6'; Hetherington (yellow card) 74'	Stadium: Tannadice Park; Attendance: 4,645; Referee: Nick Walsh

26 March 2019 30	Dunfermline Athletic	0–1	Dundee United	Dunfermline
19:45		Report	Pawlett 24'	Stadium: East End Park; Attendance: 6,096; Referee: Euan Anderson

30 March 2019 31	Dundee United	1–2	Queen of the South	Dundee
15:00	Clark 71'	Report	Dobbie 52' (pen.); Dykes 57'	Stadium: Tannadice Park; Attendance: 4,839; Referee: Alan Muir

5 April 2019 32	Ross County	1–1	Dundee United	Dingwall
19:05	Lindsay 90+4'	Report	Šafranko 12'	Stadium: Victoria Park; Attendance: 3,550; Referee: Steven McLean

12 April 2019 33	Dundee United	2–1	Ayr United	Dundee
19:05	Šafranko 63'; McMullan 74'	Report	Bell 24'	Stadium: Tannadice Park; Attendance: 4,392; Referee: Bobby Madden

12 April 2019 34	Inverness CT	0–2	Dundee United	Inverness
15:00	McKay (red card) 90+2'	Report	Šafranko 27'; McMullan 49'	Stadium: Tulloch Caledonian Stadium; Attendance: 2,971; Referee: Greg Aitken

27 April 2019 35	Dundee United	2–0	Falkirk	Dundee
15:00	Bouhenna 15'; McMullan 26'	Report		Stadium: Tannadice Park; Attendance: 5,260; Referee: Steven Kirkland

4 May 2019 36	Greenock Morton	1–0	Dundee United	Greenock
15:00	Tidser 19'	Report		Stadium: Cappielow Park; Attendance: 2,244; Referee: Grant Irvine

=== Premiership play-offs ===
14 May 2019 Play-off SF R1	Inverness CT	0–1	Dundee United	Inverness
19:45	Polworth (red card) 48'	Report	McMullan 78'	Stadium: Caledonian Stadium; Attendance: 2,604; Referee: Nick Walsh

18 May 2019 Play-off SF R2	Dundee United	3–0 (4–0 agg.)	Inverness CT	Dundee
19:45	Clark 45+1' (pen.); Sow 54'; Šafranko 80'	Report		Stadium: Tannadice Park; Attendance: 8,540; Referee: Kevin Clancy

23 May 2019 Play-off Final R1	Dundee United	0–0	St Mirren	Dundee
19:45		Report		Stadium: Tannadice Park; Attendance: 11,062; Referee: Bobby Madden

26 May 2019 Play-off Final R2	St Mirren	1–1 (1–1 agg.) (2–0 p)	Dundee United	Paisley
15:00	Mullen 26'; Nazon (red card) 115'	Report	Clark 23' (pen.)	Stadium: St Mirren Park; Attendance: 7,732; Referee: John Beaton
	Penalties
	McGinn (penalty scored); Popescu (penalty scored); Mužek (penalty missed)		(penalty missed) Pawlett; (penalty missed) Šafranko; (penalty missed) Sow; (penalty missed) Booth

=== Scottish League Cup ===
==== Group Stage Matches ====
14 July 2018	Dundee United	1–1 (3–5 p)	Arbroath	Dundee
15:00 BST	Clark 77'	Report	Linn 82' (pen.)	Stadium: Tannadice Park; Attendance: 2,939; Referee: Bobby Madden
	Penalties
	Murdoch (penalty scored); Aird (penalty scored); McMullan (penalty scored); Chalmers (penalty missed)		(penalty scored) McKenna; (penalty scored) Whatley; (penalty scored) Wallace; (penalty scored) Little; (penalty scored) Linn

17 July 2018	Ross County	1–0	Dundee United	Dingwall
19:45 BST	Lindsay 85'	Report		Stadium: Victoria Park; Attendance: 1,532; Referee: Willie Collum

21 July 2018	Dundee United	1–1 (3–4 p)	Alloa Athletic	Dundee
15:00 BST	Frans 24'	Report	Trouten 72' (pen.)	Stadium: Tannadice Park; Attendance: 1,659; Referee: Steven McLean
	Penalties
	Murdoch (penalty missed); Aird (penalty scored); Barton (penalty scored); Glass (penalty scored); McMullan (penalty missed)		(penalty scored) Taggart; (penalty scored) Spence; (penalty scored) Flannigan; (penalty scored) Trouten

28 July 2018	Elgin City	0–4	Dundee United	Elgin
15:00 BST		Report	Clark 66', 73'; Barton 81' (pen.); Glass 90+1'	Stadium: Borough Briggs; Attendance: 1,104; Referee: John McKendrick

=== Scottish Challenge Cup ===
15 August 2018 1st Round	Dundee United	3–2	St Johnstone U21s	Dundee
19:45 BST	Chalmers 64'; McMullan 78', 90+2'	Report	Hendry 21', 58'	Stadium: Tannadice Park; Attendance: 700; Referee: Colin Steven

8 September 2018 2nd Round	Dundee United	1–1 (4–5 p)	Alloa Athletic	Dundee
15:00 BST	Smith 15'	Report	Trouten 78' (pen.)	Stadium: Tannadice Park; Attendance: 1,040; Referee: Greg Aitken
	Penalties
	Fyvie (penalty scored); Thomas (penalty missed); Glass (penalty scored); McMullan (penalty scored); Smith (penalty scored)		(penalty scored) Taggart; (penalty scored) Flannigan; (penalty scored) Zanatta; (penalty scored) Trouten; (penalty scored) Graham

=== Scottish Cup ===
As a top four finisher in the SPFL Championship for the 2017–18 season, Dundee United entered the 2018-19 Scottish Cup in the fourth round, played over the weekend of 19 January 2019.

19 January 2019 Fourth Round	Montrose	0–4	Dundee United	Montrose
		Report	Šafranko 8'; Booth 43'; King 81'; Harkes 90+2'	Stadium: Links Park; Attendance: 3,604; Referee: David Munro

9 February 2019 Fifth Round	St Mirren	1–2	Dundee United	Paisley
	Nazon 77'	Report	Šafranko 15'; Clark 45'; Butcher (red card) 62'	Stadium: St Mirren Park; Attendance: 3,965; Referee: Willie Collum

3 March 2019 Quarter-finals	Dundee United	1–2	Inverness CT	Dundee
	Fyvie (yellow card) 59'; Clark 68' (pen.); Šafranko (yellow card) 85'	Report	Chalmers 19'; Donaldson (yellow card) 69'; Doran 90+2'; Rooney (yellow card) 90+4'; Austin (yellow card) 90+5'	Stadium: Tannadice Park; Attendance: 7,274; Referee: Steven McLean

== Squad statistics ==
The table below shows the number of appearances and goals scored by each player.

=== Appearances ===
As of 26 May 2019

No.	Pos	Nat	Player	Total		Championship		League Cup		Scottish Cup		Other	
No.	Pos	Nat	Player	Apps	Goals	Apps	Goals	Apps	Goals	Apps	Goals	Apps	Goals
1	GK	(Switzerland) SUI	Benjamin Siegrist	38	0	27+0	0	2+0	0	3+0	0	6+0	0
3	DF	(Scotland) SCO	Callum Booth	33	2	23+3	1	1+0	0	1+0	1	2+3	0
4	DF	(Belgium) BEL	Frédéric Frans	26	2	21+0	1	4+0	1	1+0	0	0+0	0
7	FW	(Scotland) SCO	Paul McMullan	43	7	27+5	4	2+1	0	1+1	0	6+0	3
8	MF	(Scotland) SCO	Fraser Fyvie	19	2	13+4	2	0+0	0	1+0	0	0+1	0
9	FW	(Sweden) SWE	Osman Sow	12	1	4+3	0	0+0	0	0+1	0	3+1	1
10	FW	(Scotland) SCO	Nicky Clark	36	15	13+12	8	4+0	3	2+1	2	3+1	2
12	MF	(Scotland) SCO	Sam Stanton	32	2	20+5	2	4+0	0	1+0	0	0+2	0
13	DF	(Senegal) SEN	Morgaro Gomis	8	0	2+3	0	0+0	0	1+2	0	0+0	0
14	MF	(Slovakia) SVK	Pavol Šafranko	40	15	31+2	12	0+0	0	3+0	2	2+2	1
15	MF	(Scotland) SCO	Aidan Nesbitt	8	0	1+6	0	0+0	0	1+0	0	0+0	0
16	MF	(Scotland) SCO	Matty Smith	13	1	4+4	0	2+1	0	0+0	0	2+0	1
17	DF	(Scotland) SCO	Jamie Robson	28	0	18+1	0	3+0	0	2+0	0	4+0	0
18	MF	(England) ENG	Calum Butcher	16	1	13+0	1	0+0	0	1+0	0	1+1	0
19	DF	(Algeria) ALG	Rachid Bouhenna	30	1	23+3	1	0+0	0	1+0	0	3+0	0
20	MF	(Austria) AUT	Christoph Rabitsch	17	0	9+4	0	4+0	0	0+0	0	0+0	0
22	DF	(Scotland) SCO	Sam Wardrop	6	0	1+0	0	3+0	0	0+0	0	2+0	0
25	MF	(Scotland) SCO	Cammy Smith	12	1	6+2	1	3+0	0	0+0	0	0+1	0
26	DF	(Scotland) SCO	Gavin Ritchie	0	0	0+0	0	0+0	0	0+0	0	0+0	0
27	FW	(Scotland) SCO	Louis Appéré	3	0	0+0	0	0+1	0	0+0	0	2+0	0
29	MF	(Scotland) SCO	Logan Chalmers	4	1	1+1	0	0+1	0	0+0	0	1+0	1
30	DF	(Scotland) SCO	Mark Reynolds	18	0	12+0	0	0+0	0	2+0	0	4+0	0
34	GK	(Scotland) SCO	Ross Laidlaw	1	0	1+0	0	0+0	0	0+0	0	0+0	0
35	DF	(Scotland) SCO	Luc Bollan	2	0	0+0	0	0+0	0	0+0	0	2+0	0
38	FW	(Scotland) SCO	Mati Zata	2	0	0+0	0	0+0	0	0+0	0	1+1	0
42	DF	(Scotland) SCO	Ross Graham	2	0	0+0	0	0+0	0	0+0	0	1+1	0
44	DF	(Scotland) SCO	Paul Watson	29	4	18+5	4	0+1	0	1+0	0	4+0	0
47	MF	(United States) USA	Ian Harkes	20	1	10+3	0	0+0	0	2+1	1	4+0	0
48	MF	(Scotland) SCO	Chris Mochrie	1	0	0+1	0	0+0	0	0+0	0	0+0	0
49	DF	(England) ENG	Charlie Seaman	12	0	9+1	0	0+0	0	2+0	0	0+0	0
50	MF	(England) ENG	Peter Pawlett	17	2	9+2	2	0+0	0	2+0	0	3+1	0
55	DF	(Republic of Ireland) IRL	Mark Connolly	15	0	9+0	0	0+0	0	2+0	0	4+0	0
90	FW	(Democratic Republic of the Congo) COD	Yannick Loemba	10	0	7+2	0	0+1	0	0+0	0	0+0	0
Players who left the club during the 2017–18 season
2	MF	(Scotland) SCO	Stewart Murdoch	16	0	11+2	0	3+0	0	0+0	0	0+0	0
5	MF	(Republic of Ireland) IRL	Adam Barton	10	1	5+2	0	3+0	1	0+0	0	0+0	0
6	DF	(Scotland) SCO	Lewis Toshney	0	0	0+0	0	0+0	0	0+0	0	0+0	0
9	FW	(England) ENG	Craig Curran	16	3	8+8	3	0+0	0	0+0	0	0+0	0
11	MF	(Scotland) SCO	Billy King	18	3	10+6	2	0+0	0	0+1	1	0+1	0
18	MF	(Scotland) SCO	Scott Allardice	1	0	0+0	0	0+0	0	0+0	0	1+0	0
19	FW	(Scotland) SCO	James Keatings	1	0	0+0	0	1+0	0	0+0	0	0+0	0
21	GK	(Turkey) TUR	Deniz Mehmet	0	0	0+0	0	0+0	0	0+0	0	0+0	0
23	DF	(Scotland) SCO	Tam Scobbie	0	0	0+0	0	0+0	0	0+0	0	0+0	0
24	DF	(France) FRA	William Edjenguélé	8	0	5+0	0	2+0	0	0+0	0	1+0	0
28	FW	(England) ENG	Archie Thomas	2	0	0+0	0	0+0	0	0+0	0	2+0	0
32	MF	(Scotland) SCO	Declan Glass	8	1	0+2	0	1+3	1	0+0	0	2+0	0
33	DF	(Canada) CAN	Fraser Aird	22	3	17+2	3	3+0	0	0+0	0	0+0	0
34	GK	(Slovakia) SVK	Matej Rakovan	11	0	8+1	0	2+0	0	0+0	0	0+0	0

== Team statistics ==
=== League table ===
Pos	Team	Pld	W	D	L	GF	GA	GD	Pts	Promotion, qualification or relegation
1	Ross County (C, P)	36	21	8	7	63	34	+29	71	Promotion to the Premiership
2	Dundee United	36	19	8	9	49	40	+9	65	Qualification for the Premiership play-off semi-final
3	Inverness Caledonian Thistle	36	14	14	8	48	40	+8	56	Qualification for the Premiership play-off quarter-final
4	Ayr United	36	15	9	12	50	38	+12	54	Qualification for the Premiership play-off quarter-final
5	Greenock Morton	36	11	13	12	36	45	−9	46	

Source: SPFL
Rules for classification: 1) Points; 2) Goal difference; 3) Goals scored; 4) Points in head-to-head matches; 5) Goal difference in hth matches; 6). Goals scored in hth matches; 7). Play-off (only for deciding promotion, play-off participation and relegation).
(C) Champions; (P) Promoted

=== League cup table ===
Pos	Team	Pld	W	PW	PL	L	GF	GA	GD	Pts	Qualification	ROS	ARB	ALO	DUN	ELG
1	Ross County (Q)	4	3	0	0	1	6	4	+2	9	Qualification for the Second round	—	—	—	1–0	2–0
2	Arbroath	4	2	1	0	1	9	6	+3	8		4–1	—	—	—	2–0
3	Alloa Athletic	4	2	1	0	1	8	5	+3	8		0–2	4–2	—	—	—
4	Dundee United	4	1	0	2	1	6	3	+3	5		—	1–1p	1–1p	—	—
5	Elgin City	4	0	0	0	4	0	11	−11	0		—	—	0–3	0–4	—

Rules for classification: 1) goal difference, 2) goals scored, 3) away goals scored, 4) matches won, 5) away matches won, 6) drawing of lots.
(Q) Qualified to the phase indicated

== Transfers ==
=== Players in ===
Player	From	Fee
(Scotland) Nicky Clark	(Scotland) Dunfermline Athletic	Free
(Scotland) Callum Booth	(Scotland) Partick Thistle	Free
(Scotland) Sam Wardrop	(Scotland) Celtic	Free
(England) Craig Curran	(Scotland) Ross County	Free
(Canada) Fraser Aird	(Scotland) Dunfermline Athletic	Free
(Belgium) Frédéric Frans	(Belgium) Lierse	Free
(Switzerland) Benjamin Siegrist	(Switzerland) Vaduz	Free
(Slovakia) Matej Rakovan	(Czech Republic) Vysočina Jihlava	Free
(Austria) Christoph Rabitsch	(Austria) Wolfsberger AC	Free
(Republic of Ireland) Adam Barton	(Scotland) Partick Thistle	Free
(Democratic Republic of the Congo) Yannick Loemba	(Turkey) Adana Demirspor	Free
(Scotland) Paul Watson	(Scotland) Falkirk	Free
(Algeria) Rachid Bouhenna	(Algeria) MC Alger	Free
(Scotland) Aidan Nesbitt	(England) MK Dons	Free
(Scotland) Cammy Smith	(Scotland) St Mirren	Undisclosed
(Senegal) Morgaro Gomis	(Oman) Sur SC	Free
(United States) Ian Harkes	(United States) D.C. United	Free
(Sweden) Osman Sow	(England) MK Dons	Undisclosed
(Scotland) Peter Pawlett	(England) MK Dons	Undisclosed
(Republic of Ireland) Mark Connolly	(England) Crawley Town	Undisclosed
(England) Calum Butcher	(England) Mansfield Town	Free

=== Players out ===
Player	To	Fee
(Scotland) Harvey Dailly	(Scotland) Brechin City	Free
(Scotland) Graham Taylor	(Scotland) Edinburgh City	Free
(France) Logan Martin	Free agent	Free
(Scotland) Cammy Ballantyne	(Scotland) Dumbarton	Free
(Scotland) Mark Durnan	(Scotland) Dunfermline Athletic	Free
(France) Idris Kadded	Free agent	Free
(Denmark) Emil Lyng	(Hungary) Haladás	Free
(Tunisia) Bilel Mohsni	Free agent	Free
(Scotland) Paul Quinn	Retired	Free
(Australia) Scott McDonald	Free agent	Free
(Northern Ireland) Brett Long	(Scotland) East Fife	Free
(Republic of Ireland) Willo Flood	(Scotland) Dunfermline Athletic	Free
(Scotland) Grant Gillespie	(Scotland) Raith Rovers	Free
(Netherlands) Jordie Briels	(Netherlands) TOP Oss	Free
(Scotland) Scott Fraser	(England) Burton Albion	Undisclosed
(Scotland) James Keatings	(Scotland) Hamilton Academical	Free
(England) Craig Curran	(Scotland) Dundee	Free
(Slovakia) Matej Rakovan	(Czech Republic) Fastav Zlín	Free
(Turkey) Deniz Mehmet	(Scotland) Queen of the South	Free

=== Loans in ===
Player	From	Fee
(Slovakia) Pavol Šafranko	(Denmark) Aalborg	Loan
(Scotland) Ross Laidlaw	(Scotland) Hibernian	Loan
(England) Charlie Seaman	(England) Bournemouth	Loan
(Scotland) Mark Reynolds	(Scotland) Aberdeen	Loan

=== Loans out ===
Player	To	Fee
(Scotland) Lewis Toshney	(Scotland) Arbroath	Loan
(Scotland) Scott Allardice	(Scotland) Dumbarton	Loan
(Scotland) Tam Scobbie	(Scotland) Partick Thistle	Loan
(Scotland) Declan Glass	(Scotland) Aidrieonians	Loan
(England) Archie Thomas	(Scotland) Stirling Albion	Loan
(France) William Edjenguélé	(Scotland) Falkirk	Loan
(Scotland) Billy King	(England) Gillingham	Loan
(Scotland) Lewis Toshney	(Scotland) Brechin City	Loan
(Canada) Fraser Aird	(Scotland) Queen of the South	Loan
(Republic of Ireland) Adam Barton	(Wales) Connah's Quay Nomads	Loan
(Scotland) Tam Scobbie	(Scotland) Brechin City	Loan
(Scotland) Stewart Murdoch	(Scotland) East Fife	Loan
