= 2019–20 Dundee United F.C. season =

Dundee United
2019–20 season
- Chairman: Mark Ogren
- Manager: Robbie Neilson
- Stadium: Tannadice Park
- Championship: 1st (promoted)
- Scottish Cup: Fourth round
- League Cup: Group stage
- Challenge Cup: Third round
- Top goalscorer: League: Lawrence Shankland (24); All: Lawrence Shankland (28)
- Highest home attendance: 14,108 vs. Dundee
- Lowest home attendance: 2,526 vs. Cowdenbeath
- Average home league attendance: 8,496
Home colours	Away colours

The 2019–20 season was Dundee United's 111th season, having been founded as Dundee Hibernian in 1909. It was their fourth season in the Scottish Championship, having been relegated from the Scottish Premiership at the end of the 2015–16 season. United also competed in the Challenge Cup, League Cup and Scottish Cup. On 15 April, the SPFL voted to end the lower leagues in Scottish football due to the coronavirus pandemic and as a result Dundee United were declared champions and secured promotion to the Premiership after four years in the Championship.

== Competitions ==
=== Results & fixtures ===
Win Draw Loss Postponed

=== Pre-season ===
29 June 2019 Friendly	East Fife	1–1	Dundee United	Bayview Stadium
15:00	Smith 18' (o.g.)	Report	Clark 67'	Attendance: 685; Referee: David Dickenson

5 July 2019 Friendly	Brechin City	0–6	Dundee United	Glebe Park
19:45		Report	Stanton 14'; Sow 18'; Chalmers 27'; Appéré 60'; Smith 68'; Watson 85'	Attendance: 838; Referee: Mike Roncone

6 July 2019 Friendly	Dumbarton	3–2	Dundee United	Dumbarton Football Stadium
15:00	Muhammadu Faal 48'; McKee 65'; Zata 80'	Report	Shankland 58'; Appéré 77'	Attendance: 411; Referee: Alan Newlands

27 July 2019 Friendly	Shrewsbury Town	2–1	Dundee United	New Meadow
15:00	Okenabirhie 8' (pen.), 74'	United Report	Appéré 5' (pen.)	Attendance: 2,687; Referee: Peter Wright

=== Scottish Championship ===
3 August 2019 1	Dundee United	4–1	Inverness Caledonian Thistle	Tannadice Park
15:00	Shankland 7', 31', 53', 86'	Report	Walsh 29'	Attendance: 7,023; Referee: Steven McLean

9 August 2019 2	Partick Thistle	1–2	Dundee United	Firhill Stadium
19:05	Saunders 23'	Report	Shankland 55'; Pawlett 73'	Attendance: 3,218; Referee: William Collum
Note: Game televised on BBC Scotland

24 August 2019 3	Dunfermline Athletic	0–2	Dundee United	East End Park
15:00		Report	Shankland 10', 30'	Attendance: 6,480; Referee: Euan Anderson

30 August 2019 4	Dundee United	6–2	Dundee	Tannadice Park
19:45	Butcher 14', 40'; Appéré 33'; Shankland 36' (pen.); Harkes 46'; Smith 83'	Report	Hemmings 22'; Nelson 70'	Attendance: 14,108; Referee: Kevin Clancy
Note: Game televised on BT Sport

14 September 2019 5	Ayr United	2–0	Dundee United	Somerset Park
15:00	Harvie 9'; Forrest 75' (pen.)	Report		Attendance: 3,167; Referee: Bobby Madden

21 September 2019 6	Dundee United	2–1	Arbroath	Tannadice Park
15:00	Shankland 88', 90+2'	Report	Donnelly 52'	Attendance: 7,877; Referee: Gavin Duncan

28 September 2019 7	Dundee United	6–0	Greenock Morton	Tannadice Park
15:00	Shankland 1', 5', 56'; McMullan 41', 80'; Chalmers 84'	Report		Attendance: 7,404; Referee: Alan Muir

4 October 2019 8	Alloa Athletic	1–0	Dundee United	Recreation Park
19:05	O'Hara 18'	Report		Attendance: 1,717; Referee: Greg Aitken
Note: Game televised on BBC Scotland

19 October 2019 9	Queen of the South	4–0	Dundee United	Palmerston Park
15:00	Dobbie 18', 70'; Holt 28'; Paton 77'	Report		Attendance: 1,909; Referee: Gavin Duncan

26 October 2019 10	Dundee United	2–0	Dunfermline Athletic	Tannadice Park
15:00	Shankland 9'; Clark 27'	Report		Attendance: 7,682; Referee: Steven Reid

29 October 2019 11	Dundee United	1–0	Partick Thistle	Tannadice Park
19:45	Shankland 62'	Report		Attendance: 6,929; Referee: Greg Aitken

2 November 2019 12	Inverness Caledonian Thistle	0–3	Dundee United	Caledonian Stadium
15:00		Report	Rooney 20' (o.g.); Clark 72'; Shankland 76' (pen.)	Attendance: 2,092; Referee: Grant Irvine

8 November 2019 13	Dundee	0–2	Dundee United	Dens Park
19:45		Report	Clark 56' (pen.); Shankland 64'	Attendance: 11,243; Referee: Steven McLean
Note: Game televised on BT Sport 2

16 November 2019 14	Dundee United	3–0	Queen of the South	Tannadice Park
15:00	McMullan 22'; Clark 45+1'; Stanton 14'	Report		Attendance: 7,675; Referee: Willie Collum

7 December 2019 15	Dundee United	2–1	Alloa Athletic	Tannadice Park
15:00	Clark 45+2'; Appéré 55'	Report	Reynolds 12' (o.g.)	Attendance: 7,615; Referee: Andrew Dallas

10 December 2019 16	Greenock Morton	1–2	Dundee United	Cappielow Park
19:45	Sutton 25'	Report	Appéré 5'; Shankland 31'	Attendance: 1,120; Referee: David Lowe

14 December 2019 17	Arbroath	0–1	Dundee United	Gayfield Park
15:00		Report	Stanton 6'	Attendance: 4,052; Referee: Graham Beaton

21 December 2019 18	Dundee United	4–0	Ayr United	Tannadice Park
15:00	Stanton 42'; Shankland 57' (pen.); Clark 61'; Harkes 87'	Report		Attendance: 7,744; Referee: Greg Aitken

27 December 2019 19	Dundee United	1–1	Dundee	Tannadice Park
19:45	Clark 5'	Report	Dorrans 50'	Attendance: 14,007; Referee: Alan Muir
Note: Game televised on BT Sport

4 January 2020 20	Queen of the South	0–1	Dundee United	Palmerston Park
15:00		Report	Connolly 48'	Attendance: 2,041; Referee: Colin Steven

11 January 2020 21	Partick Thistle	1–4	Dundee United	Firhill Stadium
15:00	Miller 87'	Report	Shankland 38', 60', 65'; Sporle 45'	Attendance: 4,101; Referee: Willie Collum

25 January 2020 22	Dundee United	1–1	Greenock Morton	Tannadice Park
15:00	Shankland 90'	Report	Orsi 17'	Attendance: 7,644; Referee: Andrew Dallas

1 February 2020 23	Dundee United	0–1	Arbroath	Tannadice Park
15:00		Report	Wighton 26'	Attendance: 8,056; Referee: Alan Muir

14 February 2020 24	Alloa Athletic	0–0	Dundee United	Recreation Park, Alloa
19:45		Report		Attendance: 1,442; Referee: Steven McLean
Note: Game Televised on BBC Scotland

21 February 2020 25	Dundee United	2–1	Inverness Caledonian Thistle	Tannadice Park
19:45	Appéré 12' Shankland 59'	Report	White 32'	Attendance: 7,583; Referee: John Beaton
Note: Game Televised on BBC Scotland

29 February 2020 26	Dunfermline Athletic	2–0	Dundee United	East End Park
15:00	Nisbet 26' Afolabi 60'	Report		Attendance: 6,261; Referee: Graham Beaton

3 March 2020 27	Ayr United	0–0	Dundee United	Somerset Park
19:45		Report		Attendance: 1,674; Referee: David Munro

7 March 2020 28	Dundee United	1–1	Partick Thistle	Tannadice Park
15:00	Powers 19'	Report	Bannigan 52' (.pen)	Attendance: 7,603; Referee: Mike Roncone

=== Scottish League Cup ===
12 July 2019	Heart of Midlothian	1–1 (5–3 p)	Dundee United	Tynecastle Park
19:45	Irving 44'	Report	Shankland 9'	Attendance: 9,091; Referee: Kevin Clancy
	Penalties
	Clare (penalty scored); Bozanic (penalty scored); Smith (penalty scored); Washington (penalty scored); Souttar (penalty scored)		(penalty missed) Clark; (penalty scored) McMullan; (penalty scored) Banks; (penalty scored) Bouhenna
Note: Game televised on BT Sport

16 July 2019	Stenhousemuir	1–2	Dundee United	Ochilview Park
19:30	A. Munro 70'	Report	Watson 51'; Butcher 54'	Attendance: 1,156; Referee: Steven Kirkland

19 July 2019	Dundee United	3–0	Cowdenbeath	Tannadice Park
19:45	Sporle 26' Shankland 59' Appéré 86'	Report		Attendance: 2,526; Referee: David Lowe

23 July 2019	Dundee United	0–2	East Fife	Tannadice Park
19:45		Report	Dunsmore 38'; Watt 51'	Attendance: 2,778; Referee: Graham Beaton

=== Scottish Challenge Cup ===
7 September 2019	Dundee United	0–0 (3–4 p)	Arbroath	Tannadice Park
15:00		Report		Attendance: 2,568; Referee: Mike Roncone
	Penalties
	Shankland (penalty scored); L. Smith (penalty missed); Stanton (penalty missed); McMullan (penalty scored); Clark (penalty scored)		McKenna (penalty scored); Whatley (penalty scored); Spence (penalty scored); Stirling (penalty missed); Linn (penalty scored)

=== Scottish Cup ===
19 January 2020 Fourth round	Dundee United	2–2	Hibernian	Tannadice Park
15:00	Shankland 45+3'Appéré 74'	Report	Doidge 8' Boyle 47'	Attendance: 9,400; Referee: Kevin Clancy
Note: Live on BBC Scotland

28 January 2020 Fourth Round Replay	Hibernian	4–2	Dundee United	Easter Road
19:45	Allan 40' (pen.) Doidge 60' 73' 90+1'	Report	Shankland 10' Sporle 67'	Attendance: 10,451; Referee: Kevin Clancy

== Squad statistics ==
The table below shows the number of appearances and goals scored by each player.

=== Appearances ===
As of 7 March 2020

No.	Pos	Nat	Player	Total		Championship		League Cup		Scottish Cup		Other	
No.	Pos	Nat	Player	Apps	Goals	Apps	Goals	Apps	Goals	Apps	Goals	Apps	Goals
1	GK	(Switzerland) SUI	Benjamin Siegrist	33	0	28+0	0	3+0	0	2+0	0	0+0	0
2	DF	(Scotland) SCO	Liam Smith	34	0	28+0	0	3+0	0	2+0	0	1+0	0
3	DF	(Argentina) ARG	Adrián Spörle	16	2	5+6	1	3+0	1	0+1	0	1+0	0
4	MF	(United States) USA	Dillon Powers	10	1	8+0	1	0+0	0	2+0	0	0+0	0
5	DF	(Republic of Ireland) IRL	Mark Connolly	22	1	12+5	1	3+0	0	2+0	0	0+0	0
6	DF	(Scotland) SCO	Mark Reynolds	31	0	24+2	0	4+0	0	1+0	0	0+0	0
7	FW	(Scotland) SCO	Paul McMullan	28	3	18+4	3	4+0	0	1+0	0	0+1	0
8	MF	(Scotland) SCO	Peter Pawlett	20	1	13+4	1	0+0	0	2+0	0	1+0	0
9	FW	(Sweden) SWE	Osman Sow	4	0	2+1	0	0+0	0	0+1	0	0+0	0
10	FW	(Scotland) SCO	Nicky Clark	22	7	15+3	7	3+0	0	0+0	0	1+0	0
12	MF	(Scotland) SCO	Sam Stanton	22	3	13+4	3	3+1	0	0+0	0	0+1	0
13	GK	(Turkey) TUR	Deniz Mehmet	2	0	0+0	0	1+0	0	0+0	0	1+0	0
14	FW	(England) ENG	Rakish Bingham	5	0	5+0	0	0+0	0	0+0	0	0+0	0
17	DF	(Scotland) SCO	Jamie Robson	29	0	22+1	0	2+1	0	2+0	0	1+0	0
18	MF	(England) ENG	Calum Butcher	28	3	22+0	2	3+1	1	2+0	0	0+0	0
22	DF	(Scotland) SCO	Kieran Freeman	0	0	0+0	0	0+0	0	0+0	0	0+0	0
23	MF	(United States) USA	Ian Harkes	31	2	20+6	2	1+1	0	2+0	0	1+0	0
24	FW	(Scotland) SCO	Lawrence Shankland	33	28	26+0	24	4+0	2	2+0	2	0+1	0
25	MF	(Scotland) SCO	Adam King	11	0	1+8	0	0+1	0	0+0	0	1+0	0
27	FW	(Scotland) SCO	Louis Appéré	33	5	20+6	4	1+3	1	1+1	0	1+0	0
29	DF	(Scotland) SCO	Ross Graham	0	0	0+0	0	0+0	0	0+0	0	0+0	0
37	MF	(Scotland) SCO	Archie Meekison	0	0	0+0	0	0+0	0	0+0	0	0+0	0
40	MF	(Scotland) SCO	Chris Mochrie	5	0	0+4	0	0+1	0	0+0	0	0+0	0
44	DF	(Scotland) SCO	Paul Watson	23	1	18+1	0	2+0	1	1+0	0	1+0	0
Players who left the club during the 2019–20 season
11	MF	(Scotland) SCO	Cammy Smith	12	1	1+9	1	0+1	0	0+0	0	1+0	0
16	MF	(Scotland) SCO	Matty Smith	0	0	0+0	0	0+0	0	0+0	0	0+0	0
19	DF	(Algeria) ALG	Rachid Bouhenna	1	0	0+0	0	1+0	0	0+0	0	0+0	0
19	DF	(Wales) WAL	Troy Brown	5	0	5+0	0	0+0	0	0+0	0	0+0	0
20	MF	(Scotland) SCO	Logan Chalmers	5	1	0+3	1	1+1	0	0+0	0	0+0	0
22	DF	(Scotland) SCO	Sam Wardrop	0	0	0+0	0	0+0	0	0+0	0	0+0	0
34	MF	(Scotland) SCO	Scott Banks	4	0	0+1	0	2+1	0	0+0	0	0+0	0

== Club statistics ==
=== League table ===
Pos	Team	Pld	W	D	L	GF	GA	GD	Pts	PPG	Promotion, qualification or relegation (Note: All play-off matches were cancelled, as clubs voted to curtail the season due to the COVID-19 pandemic in Scotland.)
1	Dundee United (C, P)	28	18	5	5	52	22	+30	59	2.11	Promotion to the Premiership
2	Inverness Caledonian Thistle	27	14	3	10	39	32	+7	45	1.67	
3	Dundee	27	11	8	8	32	31	+1	41	1.52	
4	Ayr United	27	12	4	11	38	35	+3	40	1.48	
5	Arbroath	26	10	6	10	24	26	−2	36	1.38	

Source: SPFL
Rules for classification: 1) Points per game.
(C) Champions; (P) Promoted

=== League cup table ===
Pos	Team	Pld	W	PW	PL	L	GF	GA	GD	Pts	Qualification	HOM	EFI	DUN	STE	COW
1	Heart of Midlothian	4	2	1	1	0	6	3	+3	9	Qualification for the Second Round	—	—	p1–1	2–1	—
2	East Fife	4	2	1	0	1	5	3	+2	8	Qualification for the Second Round	p1–1	—	—	2–0	—
3	Dundee United	4	2	0	1	1	6	4	+2	7		—	0–2	—	—	3–0
4	Stenhousemuir	4	1	0	0	3	4	6	−2	3		—	—	1–2	—	2–0
5	Cowdenbeath	4	1	0	0	3	2	7	−5	3		0–2	2–0	—	—	—

Rules for classification: 1) goal difference, 2) goals scored, 3) away goals scored, 4) matches won, 5) away matches won, 6) drawing of lots.

== Transfers ==
=== Players in ===
Player	From	Fee
(Scotland) Liam Smith	(Scotland) Ayr United	Free
(Scotland) Mark Reynolds	(Scotland) Aberdeen	Free
(Argentina) Adrián Sporle	(Argentina) Banfield	Free
(Scotland) Lawrence Shankland	(Scotland) Ayr United	Free
(Turkey) Deniz Mehmet	(Scotland) Queen of the South	Free
(Scotland) Adam King	(Wales) Swansea City	Free
(Wales) Troy Brown	(England) Exeter City	Free
(United States) Dillon Powers	(United States) Orlando City	Free
(Scotland) Kieran Freeman	(England) Southampton	Free
(England) Rakish Bingham	(England) Doncaster Rovers	Free

=== Players out ===
Player	To	Fee
(Scotland) Fraser Fyvie	(Scotland) Cove Rangers	Free
(Senegal) Morgaro Gomis	(Scotland) Falkirk	Free
(Scotland) Aidan Nesbitt	(Scotland) Greenock Morton	Free
(Scotland) Luc Bollan	(Scotland) Aberdeen	Free
(France) William Edjenguélé	(England) Wealdstone	Free
(Scotland) Billy King	(Scotland) Greenock Morton	Free
(Scotland) Stewart Murdoch	(Scotland) East Fife	Free
(Scotland) Tam Scobbie	(Scotland) Kelty Hearts	Free
(Scotland) Archie Thomas	(Scotland) Aberdeen	Free
(Scotland) Matti Zata	(Scotland) Dumbarton	Free
(Scotland) Lewis Toshney	(Scotland) Falkirk	Free
(Austria) Christoph Rabitsch	(Austria) FC Lendorf	Free
(Republic of Ireland) Adam Barton	(Wales) Wrexham	Free
(Algeria) Rachid Bouhenna	(Romania) Sepsi OSK	Undisclosed
(Democratic Republic of the Congo) Yannick Loemba	Free agent	Free
(Belgium) Frédéric Frans	(Belgium) Lierse	Free
(Scotland) Callum Booth	(Scotland) St Johnstone	Free
(Wales) Troy Brown	(England) Chelmsford City	Free
(Scotland) Scott Banks	(England) Crystal Palace	Undisclosed
(Scotland) Sam Stanton	(United States) Phoenix Rising	Free
(Scotland) Matty Smith	(Republic of Ireland) Waterford	Free

=== Loans in ===
Player	From	Fee

=== Loans out ===
Player	To	Fee
(Scotland) Declan Glass	(Scotland) Cove Rangers	Loan
(Scotland) Matty Smith	(Scotland) Cove Rangers	Loan
(Sweden) Osman Sow	(Scotland) Kilmarnock	Loan
(Scotland) Logan Chalmers	(Scotland) Arbroath	Loan
(Scotland) Sam Wardrop	(Scotland) Dumbarton	Loan
(Scotland) Cammy Smith	(Republic of Ireland) Dundalk	Loan

== See also ==
- List of Dundee United F.C. seasons
