= 2021–22 Dundee United F.C. season =

Dundee United
2021–22 season
- Chairman: Mark Ogren
- Manager: Tam Courts
- Stadium: Tannadice Park
- Scottish Premiership: 4th
- Scottish Cup: Quarter-finals
- Scottish League Cup: Quarter-finals
- Top goalscorer: League: Nicky Clark (8); All: Nicky Clark (9)
- Highest home attendance: 12,806 vs. Dundee, Premiership, 19 September 2021
- Lowest home attendance: 500 vs. Elgin City, League Cup, 14 July 2021
- Average home league attendance: 6,500
Home colours	Away colours	Third colours

The 2021–22 season was Dundee United's 113th season. It was their second season back in the Scottish Premiership, having been promoted from the Scottish Championship at the end of the 2019–20 season. The club also competed in the League Cup and Scottish Cup.

== Season summary ==
United finished their opening season back in the Scottish Premiership in 9th-place. On 25 May 2021, it was reported that manager Micky Mellon had left the club by mutual consent, and Tam Courts was appointed in June 2021.

== Competitions ==
=== Results and fixtures ===
Win Draw Loss Postponed

=== Pre-season and friendlies ===
30 June 2021 Friendly	Dundee United	1–1	Cowdenbeath	Dundee
	Shankland 33'	Report	Shankland 38'

3 July 2021 Friendly	Brechin City	1–4	Dundee United	Brechin
		Report	Clark; Pawlett	Stadium: Glebe Park

=== Scottish Premiership ===
1 August 2021 1	Aberdeen	2–0	Dundee United	Pittodrie Stadium
15:00 BST	Hayes 27'; Ramírez 51'	Report		Attendance: 6,305; Referee: Alan Muir

7 August 2021 2	Dundee United	1–0	Rangers	Tannadice Park
15:00 BST	Robson 64'	Report		Attendance: 4,600; Referee: Don Robertson

22 August 2021 3	St Johnstone	0–1	Dundee United	McDiarmid Park
15:00 BST		Report	Pawlett 60' (red card) 78'	Attendance: 5,716; Referee: Don Robertson

28 August 2021 4	Dundee United	0–2	Heart of Midlothian	Tannadice Park
15:00 BST		Report	Boyce 45+1'; Gnanduillet 90'	Attendance: 9,234; Referee: Greg Aitken

11 September 2021 5	St Mirren	0–0	Dundee United	St Mirren Park
15:00 BST		Report		Attendance: 4,894; Referee: Colin Steven

19 September 2021 6	Dundee United	1–0	Dundee	Tannadice Park
15:00 BST		Report		Attendance: 12,806; Referee: John Beaton

26 September 2021 7	Celtic	1–1	Dundee United	Celtic Park
15:00 BST	Abada 16'	Report	Harkes 18'	Referee: Kevin Clancy

2 October 2021 8	Dundee United	1–0	Ross County	Tannadice Park
15:00 BST	Niskanen 31'	Report		Attendance: 6,548; Referee: Don Robertson

16 October 2021 9	Hibernian	0–3	Dundee United	Easter Road
15:00 BST		Report	Clark 44'; Edwards 52'; Freeman 74'	Attendance: 15,114; Referee: Alan Muir

23 October 2021 10	Dundee United	2–1	Motherwell	Tannadice Park
15:00 BST	Edwards 35'; Mulgrew 77'	Report	Watt 70' (pen.)	Attendance: 6,854; Referee: Kevin Clancy

28 October 2021 11	Livingston	1–1	Dundee United	Almondvale Stadium
15:00 BST	Clark 36' (o.g.); Williamson (red card) 45+1'	Report	Pawlett 43'	Attendance: 2,586; Referee: Colin Steven

30 October 2021 12	Dundee United	0–1	St Johnstone	Tannadice Park
15:00 BST		Report	Crawford 17'	Attendance: 7,580; Referee: Grant Irvine

6 November 2021 13	Heart of Midlothian	5–2	Dundee United	Tynecastle Park
15:00 BST	Woodburn 22', 50'; Cochrane 25'; Kingsley 76'; McEneff 86'	Report	Clark 34'; Edwards 62'	Attendance: 18,129; Referee: John Beaton

20 November 2021 14	Dundee United	1–0	Aberdeen	Tannadice Park
15:00 BST	Butcher (red card) 42'; Harkes 80'	Report	Ojo (red card) 45'	Attendance: 10,500; Referee: Bobby Madden

27 November 2021 15	Ross County	1–1	Dundee United	Victoria Park
15:00 BST	Clarke (red card) 75'; Baldwin 90+3'	Report	Appéré 49'	Attendance: 3,214; Referee: Greg Aitken

30 November 2021 16	Motherwell	1–0	Dundee United	Fir Park
19:45 BST	Watt 12'; Maguire (red card) 82'	Report		Attendance: 4,287; Referee: Steven McLean

5 December 2021 17	Dundee United	0–3	Celtic	Tannadice Park
12:30 BST		Report	Rogic 19'; Turnbull 40'; Scales 81'	Attendance: 8,311; Referee: Don Robertson

11 December 2021 18	Dundee United	0–1	Livingston	Tannadice Park
15:00 BST		Report	Obileye 66' (pen.)	Attendance: 4,552; Referee: Gavin Duncan

18 December 2021 19	Rangers	1–0	Dundee United	Ibrox Stadium
15:00 BST	Tavernier 71' (pen.)	Report		Attendance: 49,252; Referee: Alan Muir

26 December 2021 20	Dundee United	1–3	Hibernian	Tannadice Park
15:00 BST	Glass 90'	Report	Nisbet 38'; Cadden 78'; Murphy 90+3'	Attendance: 500; Referee: William Collum

18 January 2022 21	Dundee United	1–2	St Mirren	Tannadice Park
19:45 BST	Power 73' (o.g.)	Report	Henderson 15'; Brophy 60'	Attendance: 4,978; Referee: Alan Muir

26 January 2022 22	Dundee United	2–1	Ross County	Tannadice Park
19:45 BST	Clark 74' (pen.), 90+1'	Report	Charles-Cook 53'	Attendance: 4,519; Referee: David Munro

29 January 2022 23	Celtic	1–0	Dundee United	Celtic Park
15:00 BST	Bitton (red card) 81'; Abada 90'	Report		Attendance: 58,188; Referee: Euan Anderson

1 February 2022 24	Dundee	0–0	Dundee United	Dens Park
19:45 BST		Report		Attendance: 11,273; Referee: John Beaton

5 February 2022 25	St Johnstone	0–0	Dundee United	McDiarmid Park
15:00 BST	Hallberg (red card) 53'			Attendance: 5,005; Referee: Colin Steven

9 February 2022 26	Dundee United	2–0	Motherwell	Tannadice Park
19:45 BST	Levitt 29'; Watt 59'	Report		Attendance: 11,273; Referee: Alan Muir

20 February 2022 27	Dundee United	1–1	Rangers	Tannadice Park
12:30 BST	Graham 29'	Report	Aribo 76'	Attendance: 9,993; Referee: Bobby Madden

26 February 2022 28	Aberdeen	1–1	Dundee United	Pittodrie Stadium
15:00 BST	Edwards 16' (o.g.)	Report	McNulty 4' (pen.)	Attendance: 18,719; Referee: David Munro

2 March 2022 29	Livingston	2–1	Dundee United	Almondvale Stadium
19:45 BST	Pittman 23'; Edwards 83' (o.g.)	Report	Smith 2'	Referee: Colin Steven

5 March 2022 30	Dundee United	2–2	Heart of Midlothian	Tannadice Park
15:00 BST	Smith 46'; Clark 57' (pen.)	Report	Boyce 1'; Halkett 81'	Referee: William Collum

19 March 2022 31	St Mirren	1–2	Dundee United	St Mirren Park
15:00 BST	Henderson 3'; Alnwick (red card) 89'	Report	Levitt 57'; McNulty 90+6'	Attendance: 5,710; Referee: Nick Walsh

2 April 2022 32	Hibernian	1–1	Dundee United	Easter Road
15:00 BST	Clarke 45+1'	Report	Graham 10'	Attendance: 16,707; Referee: Don Robertson

9 April 2022 33	Dundee United	2–2	Dundee	Tannadice Park
15:00 BST	Clark 12'; Mulgrew 55'	Report	Mullen 59'; Adam 61'	Attendance: 10,307; Referee: Steven McLean

23 April 2022 34	Dundee United	2–3	Heart of Midlothian	Tannadice Park
15:00 BST	Levitt 4'; Edwards 65'	Report	Boyce 44'; Ginnelly 59'; Simms 83'	Attendance: 6,421; Referee: Colin Steven

30 April 2022 34	Dundee United	1–0	Motherwell	Tannadice Park
15:00 BST	Levitt 37'	Report		Attendance: 6,250; Referee: Kevin Clancy

8 May 2022 36	Rangers	2–0	Dundee United	Ibrox Stadium
15:00 BST	Tavernier 55' (pen.); Diallo 78'	Report		Attendance: 49,340; Referee: Steven McLean

11 May 2022 37	Dundee United	1–1	Celtic	Tannadice Park
19:30 BST	Levitt 72'	Report	Giakoumakis 53'	Attendance: 9,401; Referee: Nick Walsh

14 May 2022 38	Ross County	1–2	Dundee United	Victoria Park
12:15 BST	Spittal 65'	Report	Clark 70' (pen.), 89'	Attendance: 5,165; Referee: Nick Walsh

=== Scottish League Cup ===
==== Group stage ====
9 July 2021 Group Stage	Kelty Hearts	0–1	Dundee United	New Central Park
19:45		Report	Shankland 77'	Attendance: 500

14 July 2021 Group Stage	Dundee United	6–1	Elgin City	Tannadice Park
19:45	Shankland 19', 32'; Clark 24'; Pawlett 40'; Freeman 54'; Mochrie 64'	Report	Hester 4'	Attendance: 500

17 July 2021 Group Stage	Dundee United	1–0	Arbroath	Tannadice Park
19:45	Mulgrew 21'	Report		Attendance: 500

20 July 2021 Group Stage	East Fife	0–1	Dundee United	Bayview Stadium
19:45		Report	Pawlett 40'	Attendance: 500

==== Knockout round ====
14 August 2021 Second Round	Ayr United	1–1 (3-4 p)	Dundee United	Somerset Park
15:00	Adeloye 56'; Baird (red card) 80'	Report	Clark 80' (pen.)	Attendance: 2,196; Referee: Nick Walsh

23 September 2021 Quarter-Final	Dundee United	1–3	Hibernian	Tannadice Park
19:45	Pawlett 58'	Report	Newell 3'; Allan 37'; Boyle 45+1' (pen.)	Attendance: 5,395; Referee: William Collum

=== Scottish Cup ===
22 January 2022 Fourth Round	Kilmarnock	1–2 (a.e.t.)	Dundee United	Rugby Park
15:00 BST	McKenzie 20'	Report	McNulty 4'; Levitt 111'	Attendance: 5,380; Referee: William Collum

12 February 2022 Fifth Round	Partick Thistle	0–1	Dundee United	Firhill Stadium
15:00 BST		Report	Harkes 34'	Attendance: 4,632; Referee: John Beaton

12 March 2022 Quarter-final	Dundee United	0–3	Celtic	Tannadice Park
15:00 BST		Report	McGregor 12'; Giakoumakis 58', 88'	Attendance: 8,553; Referee: John Beaton

== Player statistics ==
=== Appearances and goals ===
As of 14 May 2022

No.	Pos	Player	Premiership		League Cup		Scottish Cup		Total	
No.	Pos	Player	Apps	Goals	Apps	Goals	Apps	Goals	Apps	Goals
1	GK	(Switzerland) Benjamin Siegrist	34+0	0	4+0	0	3+0	0	41	0
2	DF	(Scotland) Liam Smith	19+1	2	2+0	0	2+0	0	24	2
3	DF	(Argentina) Adrián Spörle	7+8	0	0+0	0	1+1	0	17	0
4	DF	(Scotland) Charlie Mulgrew	30+1	2	3+0	1	1+0	0	35	3
6	MF	(Scotland) Kevin McDonald	6+3	0	0+0	0	1+1	0	11	0
7	MF	(Finland) Ilmari Niskanen	25+8	1	0+0	0	2+1	0	36	1
8	MF	(Scotland) Peter Pawlett	19+3	2	3+0	2	0+1	0	26	4
9	FW	(Scotland) Marc McNulty	16+3	2	0+0	0	3+0	1	22	3
10	FW	(Scotland) Nicky Clark	26+11	8	3+1	1	2+1	0	44	9
12	DF	(England) Ryan Edwards	35+0	4	3+0	0	3+0	0	41	4
13	GK	(Finland) Carljohan Eriksson	0+0	0	0+0	0	0+0	0	0	0
14	MF	(Kosovo) Florent Hoti	2+3	0	1+1	0	0+0	0	7	0
17	MF	(Scotland) Archie Meekison	7+2	0	0+1	0	0+2	0	12	0
18	MF	(England) Calum Butcher	14+3	0	3+1	0	3+0	0	24	0
19	MF	(Wales) Dylan Levitt	23+2	5	0+0	0	3+0	1	28	6
20	DF	(Scotland) Lewis Neilson	5+1	0	1+2	0	0+0	0	9	0
22	DF	(Scotland) Kieran Freeman	17+6	1	3+1	1	2+0	0	29	2
23	MF	(United States) Ian Harkes	27+1	3	3+1	0	2+1	1	35	4
25	FW	(Scotland) Kai Fotheringham	0+0	0	0+0	0	0+0	0	0	0
26	MF	(Scotland) Chris Mochrie	4+5	0	1+2	1	0+0	0	12	1
29	DF	(Scotland) Ross Graham	13+2	2	0+0	0	2+0	0	17	2
32	FW	(Scotland) Tony Watt	15+2	1	0+0	0	2+0	0	19	1
33	DF	(Scotland) Scott McMann	25+4	0	0+0	0	1+1	0	31	0
35	MF	(Scotland) Finn Robson	0+0	0	0+0	0	0+0	0	0	0
38	DF	(Scotland) Layton Bisland	0+0	0	0+0	0	0+0	0	0	0
40	DF	(Scotland) Flynn Duffy	0+0	0	3+0	0	0+0	0	3	0
43	MF	(Scotland) Lennon Walker	0+0	0	0+0	0	0+0	0	0	0
46	MF	(Scotland) Miller Thomson	1+0	0	0+0	0	0+1	0	2	0
52	MF	(Scotland) Craig Moore	1+0	0	0+0	0	0+0	0	1	0
53	FW	(Scotland) Rory MacLeod	1+2	0	0+0	0	0+0	0	3	0
58	MF	(Ghana) Mathew Cudjoe	1+1	0	0+0	0	0+0	0	2	0
94	FW	(France) Maxime Biamou	0+3	0	0+0	0	0+0	0	3	0
Players who left the club during the 2021–22 season
5	DF	(Republic of Ireland) Mark Connolly	0+1	0	0+0	0	0+0	0	1	0
6	DF	(Scotland) Mark Reynolds	1+0	0	2+1	0	0+0	0	4	0
11	FW	(Scotland) Logan Chalmers	2+3	0	1+2	0	0+0	0	8	0
15	MF	(Nigeria) Tim Akinola	1+0	0	0+0	0	0+0	0	1	0
16	GK	(Northern Ireland) Trevor Carson	4+0	0	0+0	0	0+0	0	4	0
17	DF	(Scotland) Jamie Robson	4+0	1	1+1	0	0+0	0	6	1
21	MF	(Scotland) Declan Glass	6+4	1	0+0	0	0+0	0	10	1
24	FW	(Scotland) Lawrence Shankland	1+0	0	3+1	3	0+0	0	5	3
27	FW	(Scotland) Louis Appéré	3+10	1	0+0	0	0+1	0	14	1
28	DF	(Scotland) Kerr Smith	3+2	0	1+1	0	0+0	0	7	0
30	FW	(Scotland) Darren Watson	2+3	0	0+1	0	0+0	0	6	0
31	GK	(Scotland) Jack Newman	0+0	0	0+0	0	0+0	0	0	0
36	MF	(Scotland) Rhys Caves	0+0	0	0+0	0	0+0	0	0	0
66	MF	(Cameroon) Jeando Fuchs	16+2	0	3+0	0	0+0	0	21	0

=== League table ===
Pos	Team	Pld	W	D	L	GF	GA	GD	Pts	Qualification or relegation (Note: Teams play each other three times (33 matches), before the league is split into two groups (the top six and the bottom six).)
2	Rangers	38	27	8	3	80	31	+49	89	Qualification for the Champions League third qualifying round
3	Heart of Midlothian	38	17	10	11	54	44	+10	61	Qualification for the Europa League play-off round
4	Dundee United	38	12	12	14	37	44	−7	48	Qualification for the Europa Conference League third qualifying round
5	Motherwell	38	12	10	16	42	61	−19	46	Qualification for the Europa Conference League second qualifying round
6	Ross County	38	10	11	17	47	61	−14	41	

Rules for classification: 1) Points; 2) Goal difference; 3) Goals scored; 4) Head-to-head points; 5) Head-to-Head goal difference; 6) Play-off (only if deciding champion, UEFA competitions qualification, second stage group allocation or relegation).

=== League Cup table ===
Pos	Team	Pld	W	PW	PL	L	GF	GA	GD	Pts	Qualification	DUN	ARB	KEL	ELG	EFI
1	Dundee United	4	4	0	0	0	9	1	+8	12	Qualification for the second round	—	1–0	—	6–1	—
2	Arbroath	4	3	0	0	1	6	3	+3	9	Qualification for the second round	—	—	3–2	—	2–0
3	Kelty Hearts	4	2	0	0	2	8	5	+3	6		0–1	—	—	—	3–0
4	Elgin City	4	1	0	0	3	5	12	−7	3		—	0–1	1–3	—	—
5	East Fife	4	0	0	0	4	2	9	−7	0		0–1	—	—	2–3	—

Rules for classification: 1) goal difference, 2) goals scored, 3) away goals scored, 4) matches won, 5) away matches won, 6) drawing of lots.

== Transfers ==
=== Players in ===
Player	From	Fee
(Scotland) Charlie Mulgrew	(England) Blackburn Rovers	Free
(Northern Ireland) Trevor Carson	(Scotland) Motherwell	Undisclosed
(Finland) Ilmari Niskanen	(Germany) Ingolstadt	£315,000
(Scotland) Scott McMann	(Scotland) Hamilton Academical	Undisclosed
(France) Maxime Biamou	Free Agent	Free
(Ghana) Mathew Cudjoe	(Ghana) Young Apostles	Free
(Finland) Carljohan Eriksson	(Sweden) Mjallby	Free
(Scotland) Tony Watt	(Scotland) Motherwell	Undisclosed
(Scotland) Kevin McDonald	Free Agent	Free

=== Players out ===
Player	To	Fee
(Scotland) Paul McMullan	(Scotland) Dundee	Free
(Scotland) Jake Davidson	(Scotland) Queen's Park	Free
(Turkey) Deniz Mehmet	(Scotland) Dunfermline Athletic	Free
(Scotland) Adam King	(Scotland) Alloa Athletic	Free
(Scotland) Mackenzie Lemon	(Scotland) Falkirk	Free
(United States) Dillon Powers	(United States) Orange County SC	Free
(Scotland) Lawrence Shankland	(Belgium) Beerschot	£1,000,000
(Scotland) Jamie Robson	(England) Lincoln City	Undisclosed
(Scotland) Mark Reynolds	(Scotland) Cove Rangers	Free
(Scotland) Kerr Smith	(England) Aston Villa	Undisclosed
(Cameroon) Jeando Fuchs	(England) Peterborough United	Undisclosed
(Scotland) Louis Appéré	(England) Northampton Town	Undisclosed

=== Loans in ===
Player	From	Fee
(Scotland) Marc McNulty	(England) Reading	Loan
(Wales) Dylan Levitt	(England) Manchester United	Loan
(Nigeria) Tim Akinola	(England) Arsenal	Loan

=== Loans out ===
Player	To	Fee
(Scotland) Ross Graham	(Scotland) Dunfermline Athletic	Loan
(Scotland) Kai Fotheringham	(Scotland) Raith Rovers	Loan
(Scotland) Rhys Caves	(Scotland) Airdrieonians	Loan
(Scotland) Jack Newman	(Scotland) The Spartans	Loan
(Republic of Ireland) Mark Connolly	(Scotland) Dunfermline Athletic	Loan
(Northern Ireland) Trevor Carson	(England) Morecambe	Loan
(Republic of Ireland) Mark Connolly	(Republic of Ireland) Dundalk	Loan
(Scotland) Logan Chalmers	(Scotland) Inverness CT	Loan
(Scotland) Darren Watson	(Scotland) East Fife	Loan
(Scotland) Declan Glass	(Scotland) Kilmarnock	Loan
(Scotland) Rhys Caves	(Scotland) The Spartans	Loan
