= 2020–21 Dundee United F.C. season =

Dundee United
2020–21 season
- Chairman: Mark Ogren
- Manager: Micky Mellon
- Stadium: Tannadice Park
- Premiership: 9th
- Scottish Cup: Semi-final
- League Cup: Second round
- Top goalscorer: League: Nicky Clark (8); All: Nicky Clark (11)
Home colours	Away colours

The 2020–21 season was Dundee United's 112th season. It was their first season back in the Scottish Premiership, having been promoted from the Scottish Championship at the end of the 2019–20 season. United also competed in the League Cup and Scottish Cup.

== Season summary ==
Dundee United were promoted back to the Premiership after the premature season ending due to the COVID-19 pandemic in Scotland and spent majority of summer months fighting their case in the SPFL and ended up in court with Raith Rovers and Cove Rangers fighting their promotions against relegated teams Heart of Midlothian and Partick Thistle. Also in the off-season, manager Robbie Neilson left for Hearts so Micky Mellon was hired as the new manager for United.

== Competitions ==
=== Results and fixtures ===
Win Draw Loss Postponed

=== Pre-season and friendlies ===
11 July 2020 Friendly	Motherwell	1–0	Dundee United	Motherwell
	White 55'	Report

18 July 2020 Friendly	Dundee United	0–0	Livingston	Dundee
		Report		Stadium: Tannadice Park

22 July 2020 Friendly	Rangers 'B'	1–4	Dundee United	Glasgow
	McPake 12'	Report	Clark 4' (pen.); Butcher 57'; Shankland 60'; Powers 80'	Stadium: Rangers Training Ground

25 July 2020 Friendly	Dundee United	1–1	Kilmarnock	Dundee
	Smith 1'	Report	Kiltie 46'	Stadium: Tannadice Park

25 August 2020 Friendly	Dundee United	Abandoned	Sheffield United	Dundee
15:00			Sharp 43'	Stadium: Tannadice Park; Referee: Brian McLean
Note: Abandoned after 45 minutes due to weather conditions

=== Scottish Premiership ===
1 August 2020 1	Dundee United	1–1	St Johnstone	Tannadice Park
15:00 BST	Clark 6' (pen.)	Report	Craig 55'	Referee: Kevin Clancy

8 August 2020 2	Motherwell	0–1	Dundee United	Fir Park
15:00 BST		Report	Reynolds 52'	Referee: Steven McLean

11 August 2020 3	Dundee United	0–1	Hibernian	Tannadice Park
18:00 BST		Report	Doidge 65'	Referee: Don Robertson

15 August 2020 4	Ross County	1–2	Dundee United	Global Energy Stadium
15:00	Paton (yellow card) 22'; Donaldson 29' (yellow card) 87'	Report	Appéré (yellow card) 34'; Pawlett 40'; Clark 79'	Referee: Craig Napier

22 August 2020 5	Dundee United	0–1	Celtic	Tannadice Park
17:30		Report	Ajeti 83'	Referee: Andrew Dallas
Note: Live on Sky Sports

29 August 2020 6	Kilmarnock	4–0	Dundee United	Rugby Park
15:00	Kabamba 30', 79'; Brophy 45+1'; McKenzie 86'	Report		Referee: David Munro

12 September 2020 7	Rangers	4–0	Dundee United	Ibrox Stadium
15:00	Kent 13'; Tavernier 39'; Roofe 68'; Arfield 87'	Report		Referee: Kevin Clancy

19 September 2020 8	Dundee United	2–1	St Mirren	Tannadice Park
15:00	Shankland 33'; Sporle 52'	Report	Tait (red card) 60'; Connolly 64'	Attendance: 0 Referee: Colin Steven

26 September 2020 9	Hamilton Academical	1–1	Dundee United	Hamilton
15:00	Odoffin 75'	Report	Shankland 4'	Stadium: New Douglas Park; Referee: Alan Muir

2 October 2020 10	Dundee United	1–2	Livingston	Tannadice Park
19:45	Clark 18'	Report	Guthrie 53'; Forrest 90'	Attendance: 0 Referee: John Beaton

17 October 2020 11	Dundee United	0–0	Aberdeen	Tannadice Park
15:00		Report		Attendance: 0 Referee: Alan Muir

24 October 2020 12	St Johnstone	0–0	Dundee United	McDiarmid Park
15:00		Report		Attendance: 0 Referee: Andrew Dallas

31 October 2020 13	Dundee United	2–1	Ross County	Tannadice Park
15:00	Clark 19' (pen.), 51'	Report	Shaw 81'	Attendance: 0

6 November 2020 14	St Mirren	0–0	Dundee United	St Mirren Park
19:45		Report		Attendance: 0 Referee: David Munro

21 November 2020 15	Dundee United	2–1	Hamilton Academical	Tannadice Park
15:00	Clark 76', 80'	Report	Callachan 65'	Attendance: 0 Referee: Craig Napier

5 December 2020 16	Livingston	2–0	Dundee United	Almondvale
15:00	Pittman 57'; Bartley 73'	Report		Attendance: 0 Referee: Don Robertson

13 December 2020 17	Dundee United	1–2	Rangers	Tannadice Park
12:00	Smith 33'	Report	Tavernier 26'; Goldson 44'	Attendance: 0 Referee: Steven McLean

19 December 2020 18	Hibernian	1–1	Dundee United	Almondvale
15:00	Magennis 13'	Report	Bolton 90+1'	Attendance: 0 Referee: Gavin Duncan

23 December 2020 19	Dundee United	2–0	Kilmarnock	Tannadice Park
18:30	McNulty 25'; Shankland 28'	Report		Attendance: 0 Referee: Steven McLean

26 December 2020 20	Dundee United	1–1	Motherwell	Tannadice Park
15:00	Clark 90+2'	Report	Watt 9'	Attendance: 0 Referee: Bobby Madden

30 December 2020 21	Celtic	3–0	Dundee United	Celtic Park
15:00	Soro 23'; Turnbull 40'; Edouard 76'	Report		Attendance: 0 Referee: Willie Collum

2 January 2021 22	Aberdeen	0–0	Dundee United	Pittodrie
15:00		Report		Attendance: 0 Referee: Kevin Clancy

12 January 2021 23	Dundee United	2–2	St Johnstone	Tannadice Park
18:00	Appéré 9'; Shankland 53'	Report	Melamed 16'; Kane 38'	Attendance: 0 Referee: Colin Steven

16 January 2021 24	Hamilton Academical	0–0	Dundee United	New Douglas Park
15:00		Report		Attendance: 0 Referee: Greg Aitken

27 January 2021 25	Dundee United	1–5	St Mirren	Dundee
19:45	Harkes 54'	Report	Shaughnessy 30'; McGrath 42' (pen.), 45+1' (pen.); Connolly 80'; Dennis 85'	Stadium: Tannadice Park; Attendance: 0 Referee: John Beaton

30 January 2021 26	Dundee United	0–2	Hibernian	Dundee
15:00		Report	McGregor 21'; Boyle 69'	Stadium: Tannadice Park, Dundee; Attendance: 0 Referee: Gavin Duncan

3 February 2021 27	Motherwell	2–1	Dundee United	Motherwell
18:00	Cole 23'; Long 28'	Report	Edwards 80'	Stadium: Fir Park, Motherwell; Attendance: 0 Referee: Don Robertson

6 February 2021 28	Ross County	0–2	Dundee United	Dingwall
15:00		Report	Shankland 63'; Edwards 76'	Stadium: Victoria Park; Attendance: 0 Referee: Grant Irvine

13 February 2021 29	Dundee United	3–0	Livingston	Dundee
15:00	Sporle 1'; Pawlett (red card) 31'; Shankland 35', 83'	Report	Fitzwater (red card) 61'	Stadium: Tannadice Park, Dundee; Attendance: 0 Referee: Nick Walsh

21 February 2021 30	Rangers	4–1	Dundee United	Glasgow
15:00	Hagi 35'; Kent 38'; Aribo 48'; Morelos 64'	Report	McNulty 86'	Stadium: Ibrox Stadium; Attendance: 0 Referee: Nick Walsh

27 February 2021 31	Kilmarnock	1–1	Dundee United	Kilmarnock
15:00	Medley 64'	Report	Spörle 18'	Stadium: Rugby Park; Attendance: 0 Referee: David Munro

7 March 2021 32	Dundee United	0–0	Celtic	Dundee
12:00		Report		Stadium: Tannadice Park, Dundee; Attendance: 0 Referee: Kevin Clancy

20 March 2021 33	Dundee United	1–0	Aberdeen	Dundee
15:00	Spörle 61'	Report		Stadium: Tannadice Park, Dundee; Attendance: 0 Referee: Greg Aitken

10 April 2021 34	Hamilton Academical	0–1	Dundee United	Hamilton
15:00		Report	McNulty 6'	Stadium: New Douglas Park; Attendance: 0 Referee: Bobby Madden

21 April 2021 35	Kilmarnock	3–0	Dundee United	Kilmarnock
19:45	Lafferty 32', 35', 43' (pen.)	Report		Stadium: Rugby Park; Attendance: 0 Referee: Alan Muir

1 May 2021 36	Dundee United	0–2	Ross County	Dundee
15:00		Report	White 24'; Iacovitti 28'	Stadium: Tannadice Park, Dundee; Attendance: 0 Referee: Kevin Clancy

12 May 2021 37	Dundee United	2–2	Motherwell	Dundee
19:45	Shankland 13'; Meekison 34'	Report	Long 54'; Cole 90+1'	Stadium: Tannadice Park, Dundee; Attendance: 0

16 May 2021 38	St Mirren	0–0	Dundee United	Paisley
12:00		Report	Robson (red card) 71'	Stadium: St Mirren Park; Attendance: 0 Referee: Euan Anderson

=== Scottish League Cup ===
==== Group stage ====
7 October 2020	Brechin City	2–6	Dundee United	Glebe Park
19:45	Inglis 52' (pen.); Currie 54'	Report	Clark 15', 18'; Butcher 40'; Harkes 47'; Smith 60', 90+3'	Attendance: 0

10 October 2020	Dundee United	0–1	Peterhead	Tannadice Park
15:00		Report	Boyd 51'	Attendance: 0

13 October 2020	Dundee United	1–0	Kelty Hearts	Tannadice Park
19:45	Edwards 45+3'	Report		Attendance: 0 Referee: Don Robertson

10 November 2020	St Johnstone	0–0 (3-4 p)	Dundee United	McDiarmid Park
19:45		Report		Attendance: 0 Referee: Don Robertson
Note: Live on Premier Sports

=== Scottish Cup ===
3 April 2021 Third Round	Dundee United	2–1	Partick Thistle	Dundee
15:00	Shankland 78'; Clark 90+1'	Report	Tiffoney 25'	Stadium: Tannadice Park; Attendance: 0 Referee: Steven McLean

16 April 2021 Fourth Round	Forfar Athletic	0–1	Dundee United	Forfar
19:00		Report	Pawlett 56'	Stadium: Station Park; Attendance: 0 Referee: Don Robertson

24 April 2021 Quarter-Final	Aberdeen	0–3	Dundee United	Aberdeen
15:00		Report	McNulty 18', 54'; Edwards 37'	Stadium: Pittodrie Stadium; Attendance: 0 Referee: Kevin Clancy

8 May 2021 Semi-Final	Dundee United	0–2	Hibernian	Glasgow
16:00		Report	Nisbet 27'; Doidge 58'	Stadium: Hampden Park; Attendance: 0 Referee: Bobby Madden

== Player statistics ==
=== Appearances and goals ===
As of 16 May 2020

No.	Pos	Player	Premiership		League Cup		Scottish Cup		Total	
No.	Pos	Player	Apps	Goals	Apps	Goals	Apps	Goals	Apps	Goals
1	GK	(Switzerland) Benjamin Siegrist	32+0	0	0+0	0	0+0	0	32	0
2	DF	(Scotland) Liam Smith	28+2	1	2+0	0	3+0	0	35	1
3	DF	(Argentina) Adrián Spörle	15+10	2	1+0	0	3+0	0	29	2
4	DF	(United States) Dillon Powers	6+8	0	1+2	0	0+0	0	17	0
5	DF	(Republic of Ireland) Mark Connolly	23+2	0	3+1	0	0+0	0	29	0
6	DF	(Scotland) Mark Reynolds	33+1	1	3+0	0	4+0	0	41	1
8	MF	(Scotland) Peter Pawlett	15+11	1	2+1	0	1+3	1	33	2
9	FW	(Scotland) Marc McNulty	17+8	3	1+0	0	4+0	2	30	5
10	FW	(Scotland) Nicky Clark	23+7	8	4+0	2	3+1	1	38	11
12	DF	(England) Ryan Edwards	23+0	2	4+0	1	4+0	1	31	4
15	FW	(Scotland) Logan Chalmers	8+6	0	0+0	0	0+1	0	15	0
17	DF	(Scotland) Jamie Robson	33+3	0	3+0	0	4+0	0	43	0
18	MF	(England) Calum Butcher	27+1	0	4+0	1	4+0	0	36	1
19	GK	(Turkey) Deniz Mehmet	4+0	0	4+0	0	4+0	0	12	0
20	MF	(England) Luke Bolton	18+6	0	3+1	0	1+1	0	30	0
21	MF	(Scotland) Declan Glass	0+1	0	0+0	0	0+0	0	1	0
23	MF	(United States) Ian Harkes	30+5	1	2+2	1	3+1	0	43	2
24	FW	(Scotland) Lawrence Shankland	30+2	7	0+0	0	4+0	1	36	8
27	FW	(Scotland) Louis Appéré	11+9	1	2+2	0	0+2	0	26	1
31	GK	(Scotland) Jack Newman	3+0	0	0+0	0	0+0	0	3	0
32	MF	(Scotland) Archie Meekison	2+1	1	0+0	0	0+0	0	3	1
36	FW	(Scotland) Darren Watson	3+1	0	0+0	0	0+0	0	4	0
43	DF	(Scotland) Kerr Smith	3+2	0	0+0	0	0+0	0	5	0
52	GK	(Scotland) Neil Alexander	0+0	0	0+0	0	0+0	0	0	0
53	GK	(Scotland) Ross Doohan	2+0	0	0+0	0	0+0	0	2	0
66	MF	(Cameroon) Jeando Fuchs	19+1	0	1+0	0	3+1	0	25	0
Players who left the club during the 2020–21 season
7	MF	(Scotland) Paul McMullan	3+5	0	3+0	0	0+0	0	11	0
11	FW	(Scotland) Cammy Smith	0+4	0	2+1	2	0+0	0	7	2
14	MF	(Kosovo) Florent Hoti	1+3	0	0+0	0	0+0	0	4	0
16	MF	(Scotland) Adam King	0+0	0	0+0	0	0+0	0	0	0
22	DF	(Scotland) Kieran Freeman	1+2	0	0+0	0	0+0	0	3	0
25	FW	(Scotland) Kai Fotheringham	0+1	0	0+2	0	0+0	0	3	0
26	MF	(Scotland) Chris Mochrie	0+0	0	0+1	0	0+0	0	1	0
30	DF	(Scotland) Lewis Neilson	7+2	0	1+0	0	0+0	0	10	0

=== League table ===
Pos	Team	Pld	W	D	L	GF	GA	GD	Pts	Qualification or relegation (Note: Teams play each other three times (33 matches), before the league is split into two groups (the top six and the bottom six).)
7	St Mirren	38	11	12	15	37	45	−8	45	
8	Motherwell	38	12	9	17	39	55	−16	45	
9	Dundee United	38	10	14	14	32	50	−18	44	
10	Ross County	38	11	6	21	35	66	−31	39	
11	Kilmarnock (R)	38	10	6	22	43	54	−11	36	Qualification for the Premiership play-off final

Rules for classification: 1) Points; 2) Goal difference; 3) Goals scored; 4) Head-to-head points; 5) Head-to-Head goal difference; 6) Play-off (only if deciding champion, UEFA competitions qualification, second stage group allocation or relegation).
(R) Relegated

=== League Cup table ===
Pos	Team	Pld	W	PW	PL	L	GF	GA	GD	Pts	Qualification	STJ	DUN	PET	KEL	BRE
1	St Johnstone	4	3	0	1	0	12	2	+10	10	Qualification for the Second round	—	0–0p	—	—	7–0
2	Dundee United	4	2	1	0	1	7	3	+4	8		—	—	0–1	1–0	—
3	Peterhead	4	2	1	0	1	6	5	+1	8		1–3	—	—	—	3–1
4	Kelty Hearts	4	1	0	1	2	4	4	0	4		1–2	—	1–1p	—	—
5	Brechin City	4	0	0	0	4	3	18	−15	0		—	2–6	—	0–2	—

Rules for classification: 1) points, 2) goal difference, 3) goals scored, 4) away goals scored, 5) matches won, 6) away matches won, 7) drawing of lots.

== Transfers ==
=== Players in ===
Player	From	Fee
(Scotland) Jack Newman	(England) Sunderland	Free
(England) Ryan Edwards	(England) Blackpool	Free
(Kosovo) Florent Hoti	(England) Rochdale	Undisclosed
(Cameroon) Jeando Fuchs	(Spain) Deportivo Alavés	Undisclosed

=== Players out ===
Player	To	Fee
(Scotland) Paul Watson	(Scotland) Dunfermline Athletic	Free
(Scotland) Sam Wardrop	(Scotland) Dumbarton	Free
(England) Rakish Bingham	(England) Ebbsfleet United	Free
(Sweden) Osman Sow	(Scotland) Dundee	Free
(Scotland) Cammy Smith	(Scotland) Ayr United	Free

=== Loans in ===
Player	From	Fee
(England) Luke Bolton	(England) Manchester City	Loan
(Scotland) Marc McNulty	(England) Reading	Loan
(Scotland) Ross Doohan	(Scotland) Celtic	Loan

=== Loans out ===
Player	To	Fee
(Kosovo) Florent Hoti	(Scotland) Forfar Athletic	Loan
(Scotland) Chris Mochrie	(Scotland) Montrose	Loan
(Scotland) Kieran Freeman	(Scotland) Peterhead	Loan
(Scotland) Paul McMullan	(Scotland) Dundee	Loan
(Scotland) Adam King	(Scotland) Raith Rovers	Loan
(Scotland) Kai Fotheringham	(Scotland) Falkirk	Loan
(Scotland) Lewis Neilson	(Scotland) Falkirk	Loan
(Scotland) Nathan Cooney	(Scotland) Raith Rovers	Loan

== See also ==
- List of Dundee United F.C. seasons
