= Benjamin Siegrist =

Swiss footballer (born 1992)

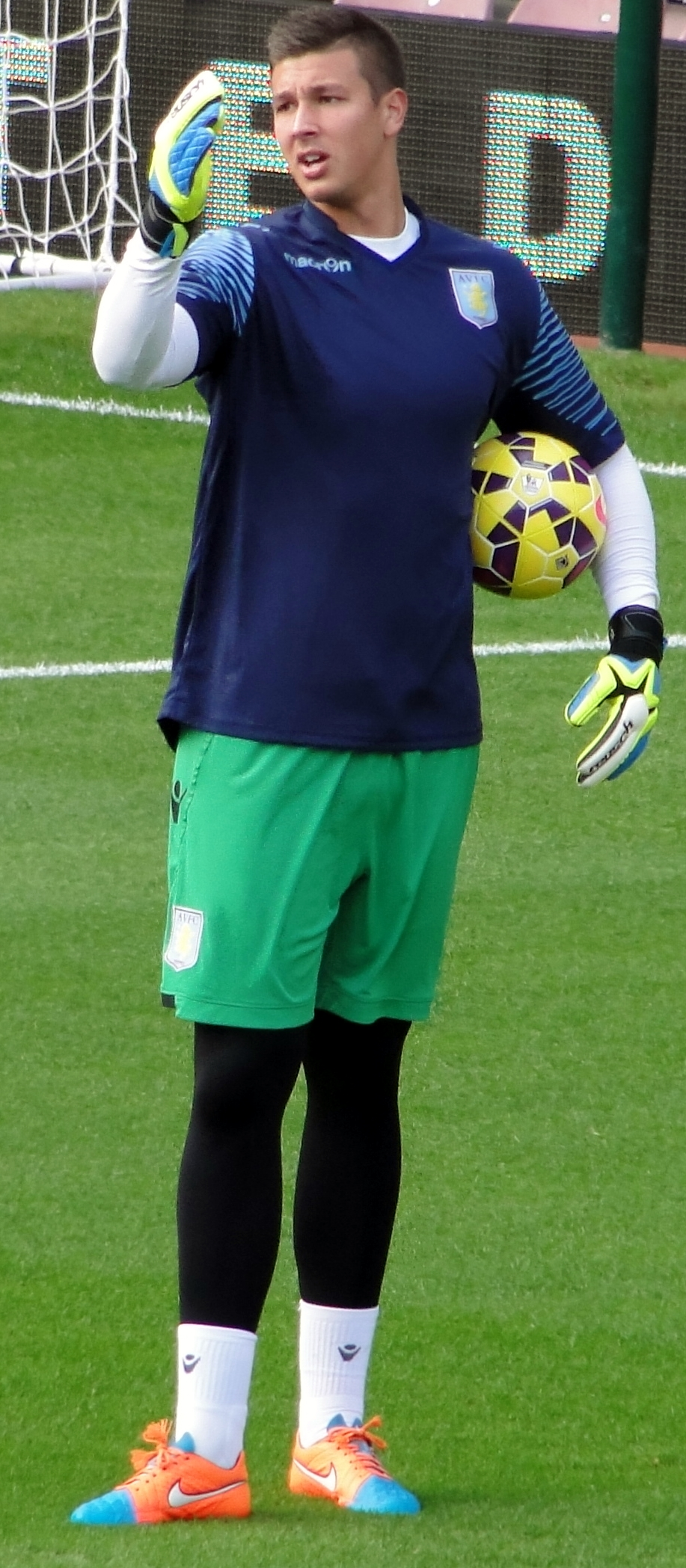
- Siegrist with Aston Villa in 2014

Personal information
- Full name: Benjamin Kevin Siegrist
- Date of birth: 31 January 1992 (age 34)
- Place of birth: Therwil, Switzerland
- Height: 1.94 m (6 ft 4 in)
- Position: Goalkeeper

Youth career
- 2000–2002: FC Therwil
- 2002–2009: Basel
- 2009–2012: Aston Villa

Senior career*
Years	Team	Apps	(Gls)
2012–2016	Aston Villa	0	(0)
2013	→ Burton Albion (loan)	0	(0)
2014	→ Cambridge United (loan)	3	(0)
2015–2016	→ Solihull Moors (loan)	14	(0)
2016	→ Wycombe Wanderers (loan)	1	(0)
2016–2018	Vaduz	32	(0)
2018–2022	Dundee United	121	(0)
2022–2024	Celtic	0	(0)
2024–2026	Rapid București	13	(0)
2025–2026	→ Genoa (loan)	2	(0)

International career
2009	Switzerland U17	11	(0)
2009	Switzerland U18	1	(0)
2011	Switzerland U19	7	(0)
2013	Switzerland U21	1	(0)
Medal record
Representing Switzerland
Men's football
FIFA U-17 World Cup
Winner	2009 Nigeria
UEFA European Under-21 Championship
Runner-up	2011 Denmark
- * Club domestic league appearances and goals as of 24 May 2025

Benjamin Kevin Siegrist (born 31 January 1992) is a Swiss professional footballer who plays as a goalkeeper.

He was a member of the Switzerland squad at the 2012 Olympic Games in London and went on to represent the Swiss Under-21s. In 2009, Siegrist was part of his nation's FIFA U-17 World Cup winning side, during which he also received the competition's inaugural Golden Glove award for best goalkeeper. During seven years in the Aston Villa Academy Siegrist undertook a series of short-term loans to English Football League and Conference sides. After a spell in the Swiss Super League with Vaduz, Siegrist signed for Scottish club Dundee United in 2018.

== Club career ==
=== Aston Villa ===
Siegrist was born in Therwil, Basel-Country. Having been spotted playing for local side FC Therwil, Siegrist continued his youth career at FC Basel in his native Switzerland and during his time there he won the Swiss U-16 league in 2008. In January 2009, just prior to his 17th birthday, he signed for Aston Villa of the Premier League. He represented the reserve and academy teams, and in July 2010 he linked up with local side Tamworth with a view to a season-long loan. The loan move never materialised, but Siegrist did play for the club in two pre-season friendlies against Rugby Town and Leamington. As a Villa youth player, he helped the club to the reach the final of the 2009–10 FA Youth Cup (which was lost 3–2 on aggregate to Chelsea) and the 2011–12 Premier Reserve League South title.

Ahead of the 2012–13 season Siegrist was promoted to Aston Villa's first team squad, receiving the number 39 shirt in the process.

==== Loans ====
Siegrist joined Football League Two side Burton Albion on a one-month loan deal on 28 November 2013. He was given the number one shirt and was named on the bench for Albion's match with Plymouth Argyle on 30 November 2013. He made no appearances, largely due to the form of Dean Lyness, and returned to Aston Villa after one month.

In March 2014 Siegrist joined Cambridge United of the Conference Premier, the fifth tier of English league football, on loan until the end of the season. On 26 March 2014 Siegrist made his professional debut in a 3–0 win away to Salisbury City. Siegrist played three matches for Cambridge conceding only one goal and helping the club to a second-place league finish, before a groin injury ended his spell at the club.

Siegrist joined Solihull Moors of the National League North on a one-month emergency loan on 8 October 2015 having recovered from a serious leg injury in May 2015. He played in the FA Cup third qualifying round for Solihull against Worcester City, the Moors forced a replay with a 1–1 draw in the first match but lost 1–0 in the replay, despite a string of fine saves from Siegrist. Siegrist made his league debut in a 1–1 draw away to Tamworth on 17 October 2015. Siegrist was named man of the match in a 2–2 draw with Lowestoft Town on 7 November 2015, making a string of saves to keep Moors in the game. Following a loan extension until March 2016 his good form continued as Moors moved clear at the top of the league in January 2016, they went on to win the league a few weeks after Siegrist's departure.

On 19 March 2016, Siegrist joined Wycombe Wanderers on loan until the end of the season as cover, ultimately only playing a single match.

=== Vaduz ===
Siegrist signed for Vaduz in the Swiss Super League in the Summer 2016 transfer window for a fee of £210,000.

=== Dundee United ===
Siegrist signed a two-year contract with Scottish Championship club Dundee United in June 2018. Manager Csaba László initially used Siegrist as understudy to Matej Rakovan, but he had become first choice by the time Robbie Neilson became manager later that year. Siegrist was part of the Dundee United team that were declared Championship winners in 2019–20, and were subsequently promoted to the Scottish Premiership. He made his 100th appearance for the club against Kilmarnock in February 2021. He made 131 saves in Premiership matches during the 2020–21 season, the most of any goalkeeper in the league, and won the club's Player of the Year and Players' Player of the Year awards, despite missing the end of the season with a broken wrist. In June 2021, United rejected an official bid to buy Siegrist from English League One club Ipswich Town. In the following summer, Siegrist left Dundee United as a free agent.

=== Celtic ===
On 21 June 2022, Siegrist signed for Celtic as a free agent on a 4-year deal. On 31 August 2022, he made his official debut for the club in a 4-1 away win against Ross County in the Scottish League Cup second round.

=== FC Rapid București ===
On 24 July 2024, having made two Scottish League Cup appearances for Celtic but never having played a league game, Siegrist joined Liga I club FC Rapid București. He links up with former Celtic manager Neil Lennon, signing a two-year contract with an option to extend for another year.

==== Loan to Genoa ====
On 28 January 2025, Siegrist joined Genoa in Italy on loan. He made his debut in a 2–2 draw with Napoli on 11 May 2025.

== International career ==
Siegrist has been part of Switzerland squads at U17, U18, U19, and U21 level. Siegrist won the 2009 FIFA U-17 World Cup in Nigeria with his nation: the goalkeeper was an integral part of the side that beat the hosts in the final and won the tournament's first Golden Glove award as a result. He was chosen as a backup goalkeeper for Switzerland's U21 squad at the 2011 UEFA European Under-21 Football Championship, but remained an unused substitute throughout the tournament as Switzerland lost 2–0 in the final to Spain. In 2012, Siegrist was chosen as a backup goalkeeper to Diego Benaglio for Pierluigi Tami's 18-man squad to represent Switzerland at the 2012 London Olympic Games.

== Personal life ==
Siegrist married Australian media personality Brittany Hockley on 4 June 2025.

== Career statistics ==
As of match played 3 December 2025

Appearances and goals by club, season and competition
Club	Season	League			National cup (Note: Includes Liechtenstein Cup, Scottish Cup)		League cup (Note: Includes Scottish League Cup)		Other		Total	
Club	Season	Division	Apps	Goals	Apps	Goals	Apps	Goals	Apps	Goals	Apps	Goals
Aston Villa	2013–14	Premier League	0	0	0	0	0	0	—		0	0
Aston Villa	2014–15	Premier League	0	0	0	0	0	0	—		0	0
Aston Villa	2015–16	Premier League	0	0	0	0	0	0	—		0	0
Aston Villa	Total		0	0	0	0	0	0	—		0	0
Burton Albion (loan)	2013–14	League Two	0	0	0	0	0	0	0	0	0	0
Cambridge United (loan)	2013–14	Conference Premier	3	0	0	0	—		0	0	3	0
Solihull Moors (loan)	2015–16	National League North	14	0	2	0	—		3 (Note: Appearances in FA Trophy)	0	19	0
Wycombe Wanderers (loan)	2015–16	League Two	1	0	0	0	0	0	0	0	1	0
Vaduz	2016–17	Swiss Super League	27	0	2	0	—		2 (Note: Appearances in UEFA Europa League)	0	31	0
Vaduz	2017–18	Swiss Challenge League	5	0	1	0	—		0	0	6	0
Vaduz	Total		32	0	3	0	0	0	2	0	37	0
Dundee United	2018–19	Scottish Championship	27	0	3	0	2	0	6 (Note: Two appearances in Scottish Challenge Cup and four appearances in Scottish Premiership play-offs)	0	38	0
Dundee United	2019–20	Scottish Championship	28	0	2	0	3	0	0	0	33	0
Dundee United	2020–21	Scottish Premiership	32	0	0	0	0	0	—		32	0
Dundee United	2021–22	Scottish Premiership	34	0	3	0	5	0	—		42	0
Dundee United	Total		121	0	8	0	10	0	6	0	145	0
Celtic	2022–23	Scottish Premiership	0	0	0	0	2	0	0	0	2	0
Celtic	2023–24	Scottish Premiership	0	0	0	0	0	0	0	0	0	0
Celtic	Total		0	0	0	0	2	0	0	0	2	0
Rapid București	2024–25	Liga I	13	0	0	0	—		—		13	0
Genoa (loan)	2024–25	Serie A	2	0	—		—		—		2	0
Genoa (loan)	2025–26	Serie A	0	0	1	0	—		—		1	0
Genoa (loan)	Total		2	0	1	0	—		—		3	0
Career total			186	0	14	0	12	0	11	0	223	0

== Honours ==
Solihull Moors

- National League North: 2015–16

Vaduz

- Liechtenstein Football Cup: 2016–17, 2017–18

Dundee United

- Scottish Championship: 2019–20

Celtic

- Scottish Cup: 2022–23

Switzerland U17

- FIFA U-17 World Cup: 2009

Switzerland U21

- UEFA European Under-21 Football Championship runners-up: 2011

Individual

- FIFA U-17 World Cup – Golden Glove: 2009
