= Sam Stanton =

Scottish footballer (born 1994)

Personal information
- Date of birth: 19 April 1994 (age 32)
- Place of birth: Edinburgh, Scotland
- Position: Central midfielder

Team information
- Current team: St Johnstone
- Number: 11

Youth career
- Hutchison Vale B.C.
- 2006–2012: Hibernian

Senior career*
Years	Team	Apps	(Gls)
2012–2018	Hibernian	57	(3)
2013	→ Cowdenbeath (loan)	2	(0)
2016	→ Livingston (loan)	13	(3)
2016–2017	→ Dumbarton (loan)	26	(4)
2017–2018	→ Dundee United (loan)	21	(4)
2018–2020	Dundee United	56	(5)
2020	Phoenix Rising	14	(3)
2021	Dundalk	29	(1)
2022–2025	Raith Rovers	88	(9)
2025	→ Arbroath (loan)	16	(3)
2025–	St Johnstone	26	(2)

International career
2012	Scotland U18	2	(0)
2012	Scotland U19	3	(1)
2014	Scotland U21	1	(0)
- * Club domestic league appearances and goals as of 4 May 2026

Samuel Stanton (born 19 April 1994) is a Scottish professional footballer who plays as a midfielder for Scottish Premiership club St Johnstone.

He has also previously played for Hibernian, with loan spells at each of Cowdenbeath, Livingston & Dumbarton, before moving to Dundee United, Phoenix Rising, Dundalk and Liverpool FC before moving back to Scotland with Raith Rovers as well as representing Scotland at youth international level.

== Early life ==
Stanton attended Broughton Primary and Trinity Academy, Edinburgh. Stanton shares his surname with a famous former Hibs player, Pat Stanton, however he is not related to him.

== Career ==
=== Hibernian ===
Stanton was a member of the Hibernian under-19 squad. He was promoted to the first team on 28 December 2011 when he was an unused substitute for the match against Inverness Caledonian Thistle. He went on to make his first team debut aged 17 as a substitute against Rangers on 28 January 2012.

He signed a three-year contract with Hibs in September 2012. Stanton was loaned to Cowdenbeath in January 2013 and made his debut in a 1–1 draw against Morton. His stint at Cowdenbeath ended after just two appearances, however, as he suffered a knee injury that required surgery.

Stanton established himself in the Hibs first team during the second half of the 2013–14 season. He won the SPFL young player of the month award for February 2014. In April 2014, Stanton signed a four-year contract extension with Hibs.

On 8 January 2016, Stanton signed for Livingston for the remainder of the 2015–16 Scottish Championship season.

Stanton joined Scottish Championship side Dumbarton on a season-long loan on deadline day in August 2016. He scored his first goals for the club in a 2–2 draw with Ayr United in February 2017

=== Dundee United ===
Stanton joined Championship team Dundee United in July 2017, initially on loan. The move was made permanent on 19 January 2018, with Stanton signing a two-and-a-half-year contract with United.

=== Phoenix Rising ===
Stanton signed with Phoenix Rising on 23 January 2020. After a successful season winning the Western Conference and reaching the USL Championship Final (which was cancelled due to the COVID-19 pandemic), Stanton and the club mutually agreed to part ways in December.

=== Dundalk ===
He signed for League of Ireland Premier Division side Dundalk in January 2021. Stanton made his debut in the 2021 President of Ireland's Cup on 12 March 2021, as his side beat Shamrock Rovers on penalties to lift the trophy. He featured in all 6 of the clubs UEFA Europa Conference League qualifiers as they were narrowly knocked out 4–3 on aggregate by Vitesse Arnhem in the Third Qualifying Round. He scored his first goal for the club on 27 September in a 2–1 win over Bohemians. Stanton made a total of 40 appearances for the club in all competitions as they finished in 6th place in the league.

=== Raith Rovers ===
On 15 December it was announced that Stanton had returned to Scotland to sign for Scottish Championship side Raith Rovers on a 2 1/2-year contract that would commence on 1 January 2022.

In January 2025, he joined Scottish League One club Arbroath on loan for the remainder of the season.

== International career ==
Stanton was selected for the Scotland national under-19 football team in August 2012. He appeared as a substitute in a 1–0 defeat against Germany. He then scored the winning goal in a 2–1 victory against Norway. On 5 March 2014, he made his debut for the Scotland under-21 side in a 2–2 draw against Hungary at Tannadice.

== Career statistics ==
As of 15 December 2021

Appearances and goals by club, season and competition
Club	Season	League			National cup (Note: Includes Scottish Cup, FAI Cup)		League cup (Note: Includes Scottish League Cup)		Continental		Other		Total	
Club	Season	Division	Apps	Goals	Apps	Goals	Apps	Goals	Apps	Goals	Apps	Goals	Apps	Goals
Hibernian	2011–12	Scottish Premier League	2	0	0	0	0	0	—		—		2	0
Hibernian	2012–13	Scottish Premier League	1	0	0	0	0	0	—		—		1	0
Hibernian	2013–14	Scottish Premiership	28	2	1	1	1	0	1 (Note: Appearances in UEFA Europa League)	0	2 (Note: Appearances in Scottish Premiership play-offs)	0	33	3
Hibernian	2014–15	Scottish Championship	22	1	3	1	2	1	—		1 (Note: Appearances in Scottish Challenge Cup)	0	28	3
Hibernian	2015–16	Scottish Championship	4	0	—		1	0	—		1	1	6	1
Hibernian	Total		57	3	4	2	4	1	1	0	4	1	70	7
Cowdenbeath (loan)	2012–13	Scottish First Division	2	0	—		—		—		—		2	0
Livingston (loan)	2015–16	Scottish Championship	13	3	1	0	—		—		2 (Note: Appearances in Scottish Championship play-offs)	0	16	3
Dumbarton (loan)	2016–17	Scottish Championship	26	4	0	0	—		—		1	0	27	4
Dundee United (loan)	2017–18	Scottish Championship	21	4	0	0	5	1	—		2	0	28	5
Dundee United	2017–18	Scottish Championship	14	0	2	0	0	0	—		4	1	20	1
Dundee United	2018–19	Scottish Championship	25	2	1	0	4	0	—		2	0	32	2
Dundee United	2019–20	Scottish Championship	17	3	0	0	4	0	—		1	0	22	3
Dundee United	Total		56	5	3	0	8	0	—		7	1	74	6
Phoenix Rising	2020	USL Championship	14	3	0	0	—		—		3 (Note: Appearances in USL Championship playoffs)	0	17	3
Dundalk	2021	League of Ireland Premier Division	29	1	4	0	—		6 (Note: Appearances in UEFA Europa Conference League)	0	1 (Note: Appearances in President of Ireland's Cup)	0	40	1
Raith Rovers	2021–22	Scottish Championship	0	0	0	0	—		—		0	0	0	0
Career total			218	23	12	2	17	2	7	0	20	2	274	29

== Honours ==
Raith Rovers

- Scottish Challenge Cup: 2021-22

St Johnstone

- Scottish Championship: 2025–26
