= Declan Glass =

Scottish association football player

Personal information
- Full name: Declan David Glass
- Date of birth: 7 June 2000 (age 26)
- Place of birth: Edinburgh, Scotland
- Height: 5 ft 9 in (1.74 m)
- Position: Attacking midfielder

Team information
- Current team: Montrose
- Number: 10

Youth career
- Hutchison Vale Boys Club
- 2015–: Dundee United

Senior career*
Years	Team	Apps	(Gls)
2017–2024	Dundee United	19	(1)
2019	→ Airdrieonians (loan)	12	(1)
2019–2020	→ Cove Rangers (loan)	16	(6)
2020	→ Partick Thistle (loan)	0	(0)
2022	→ Kilmarnock (loan)	5	(0)
2022	→ Derry City (loan)	4	(0)
2023	→ Cove Rangers (loan)	7	(1)
2024–2026	Cove Rangers	28	(3)
2026–	Montrose	3	(0)
- * Club domestic league appearances and goals as of 18 October 2026

Declan David Glass (born 7 June 2000) is a Scottish footballer who plays as a midfielder for Scottish League One side Montrose. He made his senior debut for Dundee United in October 2017, and has also played for Airdrieonians, Partick Thistle, Cove Rangers, Kilmarnock and Derry City.

== Early life ==
Glass was born in Edinburgh on 7 June 2000 and grew up in Tranent, East Lothian, where he attended St Martin's Roman Catholic Primary School and Ross High School. He played youth football for Edinburgh-based Hutchison Vale Boys Club before joining Dundee United as a youth player in 2015.

== Club career ==
=== Dundee United ===
Glass signed professionally for Dundee United prior to the 2017–18 season. He made his first team debut as a last-minute substitute in a 2–0 Scottish Championship win at Dumbarton in October 2017.

Glass was loaned to League One team Airdrieonians in January 2019. In July 2019 he went on loan again, joining Cove Rangers in League Two until the following January. Glass joined Scottish League One side Partick Thistle in a loan deal on 24 September 2020. This deal was scheduled to last for the rest of the 2019/20 season, but was curtailed after Glass suffered a knee injury.

Glass was loaned to Kilmarnock in February 2022.

On 29 July 2022, Glass signed for League of Ireland Premier Division club Derry City on a year long loan. He made his debut for the club the following day, scoring a first half hat-trick in a 7–0 win over non-league side Oliver Bond Celtic in an FAI Cup first round tie.

On 6 January 2023, Glass rejoined Cove Rangers, now two divisions higher in the Scottish Championship, until the end of the season.

On 19 June 2024, he returned to Cove Rangers signing a permanent deal.

On 7 May 2026, Glass signed a two-year deal with Scottish League One side Montrose.

== International career ==
Glass was called up to the Scotland under-18 schoolboys squad in December 2016 for the Centenary Shield tournament.

== Career statistics ==
As of match played on 16 October 2022

Appearances and goals by club, season and competition
Club	Season	League			National Cup		League Cup		Other		Total	
Club	Season	Division	Apps	Goals	Apps	Goals	Apps	Goals	Apps	Goals	Apps	Goals
Dundee United	2017–18	Scottish Championship	2	0	0	0	0	0	0	0	2	0
Dundee United	2018–19	Scottish Championship	2	0	0	0	4	1	2 (Note: Appearances in the Scottish Challenge Cup)	0	8	1
Dundee United	2019–20	Scottish Championship	5	0	2	0	0	0	0	0	7	0
Dundee United	2020–21	Scottish Premiership	1	0	0	0	0	0	0	0	1	0
Dundee United	2021–22	Scottish Premiership	9	1	0	0	0	0	0	0	9	1
Dundee United	2022–23	Scottish Premiership	0	0	0	0	0	0	0	0	0	0
Dundee United	Total		19	1	2	0	4	1	2	0	27	2
Airdrieonians (loan)	2018–19	Scottish League One	12	1	1	0	0	0	0	0	13	1
Cove Rangers (loan)	2019–20	Scottish League Two	16	6	0	0	2	1	3	0	21	5
Partick Thistle (loan)	2020–21	Scottish League One	0	0	0	0	0	0	0	0	0	0
Kilmarnock (loan)	2021–22	Scottish Championship	6	0	0	0	0	0	1	0	7	0
Derry City (loan)	2022	LOI Premier Division	4	0	3	3	0	0	0	0	7	3
Cove Rangers	2024–25	Scottish League One	16	3	3	1	4	0	1	0	24	4
Career total			57	6	6	3	6	2	6	0	75	11
