= Cammy Smith =

Scottish footballer (born 1995)

Personal information
- Full name: Cameron Smith
- Date of birth: 24 August 1995 (age 31)
- Place of birth: Aberdeen, Scotland
- Height: 5 ft 9 in (1.75 m)
- Positions: Midfielder; forward

Team information
- Current team: Peterhead
- Number: 17

Youth career
- Aberdeen

Senior career*
Years	Team	Apps	(Gls)
2011–2017	Aberdeen	76	(3)
2016–2017	→ Dundee United (loan)	16	(1)
2017	→ St Mirren (loan)	15	(1)
2017–2019	St Mirren	53	(10)
2019–2021	Dundee United	22	(2)
2020	→ Dundalk (loan)	5	(0)
2020–2021	→ Ayr United (loan)	9	(3)
2021	Ayr United	11	(3)
2021	Indy Eleven	13	(1)
2021–2023	Partick Thistle	45	(1)
2023–2024	Morecambe	17	(1)
2024–	Peterhead	57	(8)

International career^{‡}
2010–2011	Scotland U16	5	(1)
2011–2012	Scotland U17	12	(1)
2012–2014	Scotland U19	7	(1)
2015	Scotland U21	1	(0)
- * Club domestic league appearances and goals as of 4 May 2026 ‡ National team caps and goals as of 7 April 2015 (UTC)

Cameron Smith (born 24 August 1995) is a Scottish footballer who plays as a midfielder or a forward for Scottish League One club Peterhead. He began his career with Aberdeen, and initially played for Dundee United on loan in 2016 before joining St Mirren. He rejoined Dundee United permanently in 2019, and was on loan to Irish club Dundalk in 2020. After brief stints with Ayr United and Indy Eleven, Smith joined Partick Thistle in July 2021. Smith has represented Scotland at various levels up to under-21 international.

== Career ==
=== Aberdeen ===
Smith was raised in the village of Balmedie in Aberdeenshire, where he was a neighbour of fellow footballer Scott Wright, and attended Bridge of Don Academy. He came through Aberdeen's youth system, and was considered to be one of their brightest prospects. Manager Craig Brown wanted to give Smith his debut at the start of the 2011–12 season; however, Smith was under 16 and Scottish Premier League rules prevented him from playing. He eventually made his debut on 21 April 2012, coming on as a 54th-minute substitute against Inverness Caledonian Thistle.

Smith's first game of the 2012–13 season came as a substitute at Pittodrie against St Mirren, in which he hit the crossbar with a header. He went on to score his first senior goal with a header in a 1–1 draw at Inverness Caledonian Thistle. Smith came on as an early substitute in Aberdeen's win in the League Cup Final over the same opposition but was himself substituted later in the game. In the 2014–15 season, Smith made several substitute appearances and scored in a 2–0 win against St Johnstone, at the time sending the Dons to the top of the table.

In July 2016, Smith joined Scottish Championship side Dundee United on loan where he scored five goals in 23 appearances. His loan with United was cut short on 26 January 2017.

=== St Mirren ===
After leaving Dundee United, Smith was loaned to fellow Championship side St Mirren for the remainder of the season. After his loan deal ended, Smith signed a two-year contract to join St Mirren on a permanent transfer on 22 May 2017. He was St Mirren's player of the year in 2018 as they won the Championship title and were promoted.

=== Dundee United ===
Smith rejoined Dundee United on a permanent basis in January 2019, for an undisclosed transfer fee.

On 3 February 2020, it was announced that Smith had joined League of Ireland Premier Division Champions Dundalk on loan, following a successful trial period. He returned to Dundee United in June 2020, following the shutdown of football caused by the COVID-19 pandemic. Smith was loaned to Ayr United in October 2020.

On 20 January 2021, it was announced that Smith had left Dundee Utd., following the expiration of his contract.

=== Ayr United ===
After leaving Dundee United, Smith signed a short-term contract with Ayr United.

=== Indy Eleven ===
On 1 April 2021, Smith joined USL Championship side Indy Eleven.

=== Partick Thistle ===
Smith returned to Scotland in July 2021 and signed a two-year contract with Partick Thistle.

=== Morecambe ===
In June 2023, Smith signed for recently relegated League Two club Morecambe on a one-year deal.

== Style of play ==
Smith is primarily a forward but can also play in midfield. Former Aberdeen manager Craig Brown said that he was, "a strong, gifted striker." and said that he played like Dennis Bergkamp but was built like Joe Harper.

== Career statistics ==
As of 7 April 2021

Appearances and goals by club, season and competition
Club	Season	League			National Cup		League Cup		Other		Total	
Club	Season	Division	App	Goals	App	Goals	App	Goals	App	Goals	App	Goals
Aberdeen	2011–12	Scottish Premier League	2	0	0	0	0	0	—		2	0
Aberdeen	2012–13	Scottish Premier League	18	1	1	0	2	0	—		21	1
Aberdeen	2013–14	Scottish Premiership	18	0	2	0	2	1	—		22	1
Aberdeen	2014–15	Scottish Premiership	24	2	1	0	3	0	2 (Note: Appearances in the Europa League)	0	30	2
Aberdeen	2015–16	Scottish Premiership	14	0	0	0	0	0	0	0	14	0
Aberdeen	2016–17	Scottish Premiership	0	0	—		—		0	0	0	0
Aberdeen	Total		76	3	4	0	7	1	2	0	89	4
Dundee United (loan)	2016–17	Scottish Championship	16	1	0	0	4	4	2 (Note: Appearances in the Scottish Challenge Cup)	0	22	5
St Mirren (loan)	2016–17	Scottish Championship	15	1	2	1	0	0	0	0	17	2
St Mirren	2017–18	Scottish Championship	34	10	2	1	4	2	3	0	43	13
St Mirren	2018–19	Scottish Premiership	19	0	0	0	5	2	—		24	2
St Mirren	Total		53	10	2	1	9	4	3	0	67	15
Dundee United	2018–19	Scottish Championship	7	1	3	0	0	0	1 (Note: Appearance in the Scottish Premiership play-offs)	0	12	1
Dundee United	2019–20	Scottish Championship	10	1	0	0	1	0	1	0	12	1
Dundalk (loan)	2020	League of Ireland Premier Division	5	0	—		—		—		5	0
Dundee United	2020–21	Scottish Premiership	4	0	—		3	2	—		7	2
Dundee United	Total		21	2	3	0	4	2	2	0	31	4
Ayr United (loan)	2020–21	Scottish Championship	9	3	—		—		—		9	3
Ayr United	2020–21	Scottish Championship	11	3	1	0	—		—		12	3
Ayr United	Total		20	6	1	0	—		—		21	6
Indy Eleven	2021	USL Championship	13	1	0	0	—		—		13	1
Career total			219	24	12	2	24	11	9	0	265	37

== Honours ==
Aberdeen

- Scottish League Cup: 2013–14

St Mirren

- Scottish Championship: 2017–18
