= Yannick Loemba =

Congolese footballer

Personal information
- Date of birth: 21 April 1990 (age 36)
- Place of birth: Brazzaville, Republic of the Congo
- Height: 1.78 m (5 ft 10 in)
- Position: Winger

Team information
- Current team: UR Namur
- Number: 23

Senior career*
Years	Team	Apps	(Gls)
2011–2014	WS Bruxelles	59	(9)
2014–2015	Mons	31	(9)
2015–2017	Oostende	8	(0)
2016–2017	→ OH Leuven (loan)	26	(3)
2017	Adana Demirspor	4	(0)
2018–2019	Dundee United	9	(0)
2021–2022	Mons	0	(0)
2022–2025	RFC Liège	62	(7)
2025–	UR Namur	18	(2)

International career
2015	Congo U23	1	(0)
- * Club domestic league appearances and goals as of 28 June 2026

Yannick Loemba (born 21 April 1990) is a Congolese footballer who plays for UR Namur in the Belgian Division 1.

== Club career ==
Loemba signed a two-year contract with Dundee United in July 2018. Having made ten appearances in the early part of the 2018-19 season, he rarely featured after Robbie Neilson replaced Csaba László as manager and was released by the club in July 2019.

== International career ==
Loemba was born in the Republic of the Congo, and moved to Belgium when he was eight years old. He appeared for the Congo U23s for a friendly against Morocco U23s.
