= Paul McMullan (footballer, born 1996) =

Scottish footballer (born 1996)

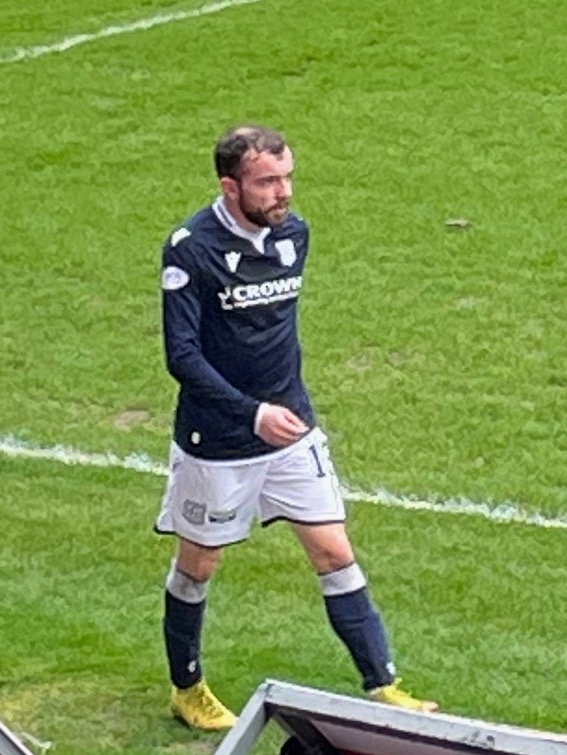

Personal information
- Full name: Paul James McMullan
- Date of birth: 25 February 1996 (age 30)
- Place of birth: Stirling, Scotland
- Height: 5 ft 9 in (1.76 m)
- Positions: Winger; forward

Team information
- Current team: Raith Rovers
- Number: 18

Senior career*
Years	Team	Apps	(Gls)
2015–2017	Celtic	0	(0)
2015	→ Stenhousemuir (loan)	15	(3)
2015–2016	→ St Mirren (loan)	17	(1)
2016	→ Greenock Morton (loan)	11	(1)
2016–2017	→ Dunfermline Athletic (loan)	29	(2)
2017–2021	Dundee United	93	(11)
2021	→ Dundee (loan)	15	(0)
2021–2023	Dundee	71	(6)
2023–2025	Derry City	65	(3)
2025–	Raith Rovers	28	(1)

International career
2011	Scotland U16	4	(1)
2012	Scotland U17	3	(1)
2014–2015	Scotland U19	7	(1)
2017	Scotland U21	1	(0)
- * Club domestic league appearances and goals as of 5 September 2026

Paul James McMullan (born 25 February 1996) is a Scottish professional footballer who plays as a winger for Scottish Championship club Raith Rovers. McMullan started his career with Celtic and has also had loan spells at Greenock Morton, Stenhousemuir, St Mirren and Dunfermline Athletic. He then signed for Dundee United before joining their city rivals Dundee, winning the Scottish Championship with both clubs. After leaving Dundee, McMullan spent the next couple of years with League of Ireland Premier Division side Derry City.

== Career ==
=== Celtic ===
Born in Stirling, McMullan began his career in the under-19 team at Celtic.

=== Stenhousemuir (loan) ===
On 23 January 2015, he joined Scottish League One club Stenhousemuir on loan for the remainder of the season. He made his senior debut the following day, playing the full 90 minutes of a 1–1 draw with Ayr United at Ochilview Park, scoring his team's goal. On 14 February, he opened the scoring away to Dunfermline Athletic, who came from behind to defeat Stenhousemuir 3–2. McMullan's only other goal of 14 league appearances came on 11 April in a defeat by the same score at Greenock Morton. Stenhousemuir finished in the relegation play-off places, but stayed up with a 2–1 aggregate victory over Queen's Park: McMullan's free-kick set up Jamie McCormack to head the only goal of the first leg on 13 May, and he also assisted Colin McMenamin in the second leg three days later.

=== St Mirren (loan) ===
On 13 July 2015, McMullan was loaned to Scottish Championship club St Mirren for the 2015–16 season. He made his debut 12 days later, playing the full 90 minutes of a 3–1 home win over Berwick Rangers in the first round of the Scottish Challenge Cup. On 7 August, he made his league debut for the team in a defeat by the same score to Rangers at Ibrox. Twenty-two days later, he scored his only goal for the team from Paisley, taking four minutes to open a 1–1 draw against Livingston at St. Mirren Park; the result meant his team had not won yet in four league games of the season.

In January 2016, McMullan's loan was ended by Saints, and he returned to Celtic. In total, he played 22 games for the club, scoring once.

=== Greenock Morton (loan) ===
McMullan was loaned to Greenock Morton on 24 February 2016, making his debut in a 3–0 Championship win at Hibernian on the same day. On 15 March at Cappielow, he scored his first goal for the Ton, putting them 3–0 up at half time in an eventual 3–2 win over Queen of the South.

=== Dunfermline Athletic (loan) ===
On 4 July 2016, McMullan was loaned to newly promoted Championship team Dunfermline Athletic, as PJ Crossan made the move in the other direction on a permanent basis.

=== Dundee United ===
On 23 June 2017, McMullan signed a two-year contract with Dundee United.

=== Dundee ===
On 7 January 2021, McMullan signed a pre-contract with United's crosstown rivals Dundee, which would see him begin a two-year deal at the end of the season. On 26 January, McMullan joined Dundee on loan until the end of the season. Despite only joining in January, McMullan would sit atop the league assist charts by the end of the season, and would play a key role in helping the club win the Premiership play-offs and gaining promotion back to the Scottish Premiership. At the end of the season, McMullan was named in the SPFL's Championship Team of the Season.

McMullan officially joined Dundee on his two-year deal in June 2021. He would score his first competitive goals for the club in the Scottish League Cup, netting a brace against Brora Rangers. On 5 March 2022, McMullan would finally score his first league goal for the club since he joined over a year prior in a draw away to Motherwell.

After returning to the Scottish Championship the following season, McMullan would have a very strong start in both goals and assists, and would be named the Championship Player of the Month in November 2022. At the end of the season McMullan would be nominated for PFA Scotland's Championship Player of the Year, and would win the Scottish Championship with Dundee. On 31 May 2023, Dundee announced McMullan had not been offered a new contract and would leave the club.

=== Derry City ===
On 25 June 2023, McMullan signed with League of Ireland Premier Division club Derry City, and would start playing for the side on 1 July. He would make his first start and appearance in a home win over Sligo Rovers. McMullan scored his first goal for the Candystripes on 6 May 2024 in a league draw against Shelbourne. On 30 June 2025, it was reported that McMullan had left Derry in favour of a move back to Scotland.

=== Raith Rovers ===
On 1 July 2025, McMullan returned to Scotland and joined Scottish Championship club Raith Rovers on a two-year deal.

=== International ===
McMullan represented Scotland at the under-16, under-17, under-19 and under-21 levels. He made his debut for the under-21 team in March 2017, appearing in a goalless draw against Estonia.

== Career statistics ==
As of match played 5 September 2026

Appearances and goals by club, season and competition
Club	Season	League			National Cup		League Cup		Other		Total	
Club	Season	Division	Apps	Goals	Apps	Goals	Apps	Goals	Apps	Goals	Apps	Goals
Celtic	2014–15	Scottish Premiership	0	0	0	0	0	0	0	0	0	0
Celtic	2015–16	Scottish Premiership	0	0	0	0	0	0	0	0	0	0
Celtic	2016–17	Scottish Premiership	0	0	0	0	0	0	0	0	0	0
Celtic	Total		0	0	0	0	0	0	0	0	0	0
Stenhousemuir (loan)	2014–15	Scottish League One	15	3	0	0	0	0	4 (Note: Appearances in the Scottish League One play-offs)	0	19	3
St Mirren (loan)	2015–16	Scottish Championship	17	1	1	0	1	0	3 (Note: Appearances in the Scottish Challenge Cup)	0	22	1
Greenock Morton (loan)	2015–16	Scottish Championship	11	1	0	0	0	0	0	0	11	1
Dunfermline Athletic (loan)	2016–17	Scottish Championship	29	2	4	4	4	0	2	1	39	7
Dundee United	2017–18	Scottish Championship	30	4	1	1	5	3	4 (Note: Two appearances and one goal in the Scottish Challenge Cup and two appearances in the Scottish Premiership play-offs)	1	40	9
Dundee United	2018–19	Scottish Championship	32	4	2	0	3	0	6 (Note: Two appearances and two goals in the Scottish Challenge Cup and four appearances and one goal in the Scottish Premiership play-offs)	3	43	7
Dundee United	2019–20	Scottish Championship	23	3	1	0	4	0	1	0	29	3
Dundee United	2020–21	Scottish Premiership	8	0	0	0	3	0	0	0	11	0
Dundee United	Total		93	11	4	1	15	3	11	4	123	19
Dundee (loan)	2020–21	Scottish Championship	15	0	1	0	—		4 (Note: Appearances in the Premiership play-offs)	0	20	0
Dundee	2021–22	Scottish Premiership	36	1	3	0	5	2	—		44	3
Dundee	2022–23	Scottish Championship	35	5	2	1	5	0	4	1	46	7
Dundee	Total		86	6	6	1	10	2	8	1	110	10
Derry City	2023	League of Ireland Premier Division	12	0	2	0	—		6 (Note: Appearances in the UEFA Europa Conference League)	0	20	0
Derry City	2024	League of Ireland Premier Division	36	3	5	0	—		2 (Note: Appearances in the UEFA Conference League)	0	43	3
Derry City	2025	League of Ireland Premier Division	17	0	—		—		—		17	0
Derry City	Total		65	3	7	0	—		8	0	80	3
Raith Rovers	2025–26	Scottish Championship	23	0	2	0	4	0	3	0	32	0
Raith Rovers	2026–27	Scottish Championship	5	1	0	0	4	0	0	0	9	1
Raith Rovers	Total		28	1	2	0	8	0	3	0	41	1
Career total			344	28	24	6	38	5	39	6	445	45

== Honours ==
=== Club ===
Dundee United

- Scottish Championship: 2019–20

Dundee

- Scottish Premiership play-offs: 2020–21
- Scottish Championship: 2022–23

Raith Rovers

- Scottish Challenge Cup: 2025–26

=== Individual ===
Dundee

- SPFL Championship Team of the Season: 2020–21
- Scottish Championship Player of the Month: November 2022
