= Rachid Bouhenna =

Algerian professional footballer (born 1991)

Personal information
- Full name: Rachid Ahmed Bouhenna
- Date of birth: 29 June 1991 (age 35)
- Place of birth: Méru, France
- Height: 1.91 m (6 ft 3 in)
- Position: Centre-back

Team information
- Current team: TFC
- Number: 29

Youth career
- 2006–2008: Beauvais
- 2008–2011: Sedan

Senior career*
Years	Team	Apps	(Gls)
2011–2013	Doncaster Rovers	0	(0)
2013	RE Bertrix	9	(1)
2013	Compiègne	8	(0)
2014–2015	CS Constantine	29	(0)
2015–2018	MC Alger	54	(1)
2018–2019	Dundee United	26	(1)
2019–2021	Sepsi OSK	60	(4)
2021–2022	CFR Cluj	10	(1)
2022–2023	FCSB	4	(0)
2023	Ionikos	5	(0)
2024	Politehnica Iași	12	(0)
2025–	TFC	9	(1)

International career
2010	Algeria U23	2	(0)
- * Club domestic league appearances and goals as of 12 May 2024

Rachid Ahmed Bouhenna (Arabic: رشيد احمد بوهنة; born 29 June 1991) is a professional footballer who plays UAE Third Division League club TFC as a defender. Born in France, he played for the Algeria national team at under-23 international level.

== Club career ==
In June 2015, Bouhenna signed a three-year contract with MC Alger. In August 2018 he joined Scottish side Dundee United on a two-year deal.

On 29 July 2019, Bouhenna signed a two-year contract with Sepsi OSK Sfântu Gheorghe.

== Career statistics ==
=== Club ===
As of matches played on 12 May 2024

Appearances and goals by club, season and competition
Club	Season	League			National Cup (Note: Includes Algerian Cup, Scottish Cup, Cupa României)		League Cup (Note: Includes Scottish League Cup)		Continental		Other		Total	
Club	Season	Division	Apps	Goals	Apps	Goals	Apps	Goals	Apps	Goals	Apps	Goals	Apps	Goals
Doncaster Rovers	2011–12	Championship	0	0	0	0	—		—		—		0	0
Bertrix	2012—13	Belgian Third Division	9	1	0	0	—		—		—		9	1
Compiègne	2013—14	CFA2	8	0	0	0	—		—		—		8	0
CS Constantine	2013–14	Algerian Ligue 1	10	0	0	0	—		—		—		10	0
CS Constantine	2014–15	Algerian Ligue 1	19	0	0	0	—		—		—		19	0
CS Constantine	Total		29	0	0	0	—		—		—		29	0
MC Alger	2015–16	Algerian Ligue 1	21	1	2	0	—		—		—		23	1
MC Alger	2016–17	Algerian Ligue 1	15	0	2	0	—		7 (Note: Appearances in CAF Confederation Cup)	0	—		24	0
MC Alger	2017–18	Algerian Ligue 1	16	0	0	0	—		4 (Note: Appearances in CAF Champions League)	0	—		20	0
MC Alger	2018–19	Algerian Ligue 1	2	0	0	0	—		—		—		2	0
MC Alger	Total		54	1	4	0	—		11	0	—		69	1
Dundee United	2018–19	Scottish Championship	26	1	1	0	1	0	—		3 (Note: Appearances in Scottish Premiership play-offs)	0	31	1
Sepsi OSK	2019–20	Liga I	30	1	5	0	—		—		—		35	1
Sepsi OSK	2020–21	Liga I	30	3	0	0	—		—		—		30	3
Sepsi OSK	Total		60	4	5	0	—		—		—		65	4
CFR Cluj	2021–22	Liga I	10	1	0	0	0	0	8 (Note: Five appearances in UEFA Champions League, three appearances in UEFA Conference League)	0	1 (Note: Appearance in Supercupa României)	0	19	1
FCSB	2022–23	Liga I	4	0	2	0	—		3	0	—		9	0
Ionikos	2022–23	Super League Greece	5	0	—		—		—		—		5	0
Politehnica Iași	2023–24	Liga I	12	0	—		—		—		—		12	0
Career total			217	7	12	0	1	0	22	0	4	0	256	7

== Honours ==
MC Alger

- Algerian Cup: 2015–16
- Algerian Super Cup runner-up: 2016

Sepsi OSK

- Cupa României runner-up: 2019–20

CFR Cluj

- Liga I: 2021–22
- Supercupa României runner-up: 2021
