= Christoph Rabitsch =

Austrian footballer

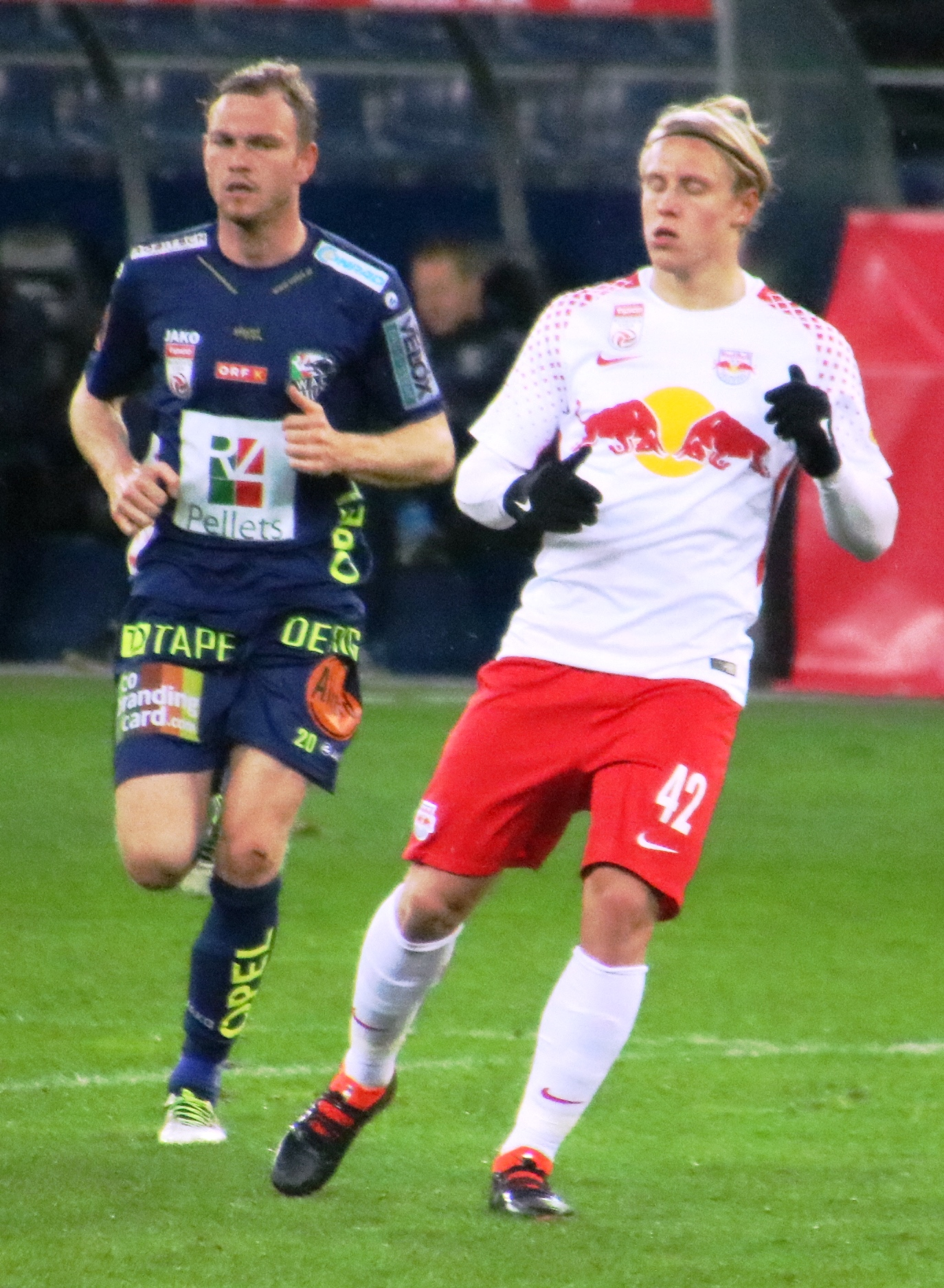
- Rabitsch (left) in 2018.

Personal information
- Full name: Christoph Rabitsch
- Date of birth: 10 April 1996 (age 30)
- Place of birth: Spittal an der Drau, Austria
- Position: Midfielder

Team information
- Current team: FC Lendorf

Youth career
- SV Spittal/Drau

Senior career*
| Years | Team | Apps | (Gls) |
| 2012–2013 | SV Spittal/Drau | 8 | (1) |
| 2013–2016 | Wolfsberger AC II | 55 | (3) |
| 2014–2018 | Wolfsberger AC | 57 | (0) |
| 2018–2019 | Dundee United | 13 | (0) |
| 2019– | FC Lendorf | 0 | (0) |
- * Club domestic league appearances and goals

Christoph Rabitsch (born 10 April 1996) is an Austrian footballer who plays for FC Lendorf. He previously played for SV Spittal/Drau and Wolfsberger AC in Austria and Dundee United in Scotland.
