= Matej Rakovan =

Slovak footballer

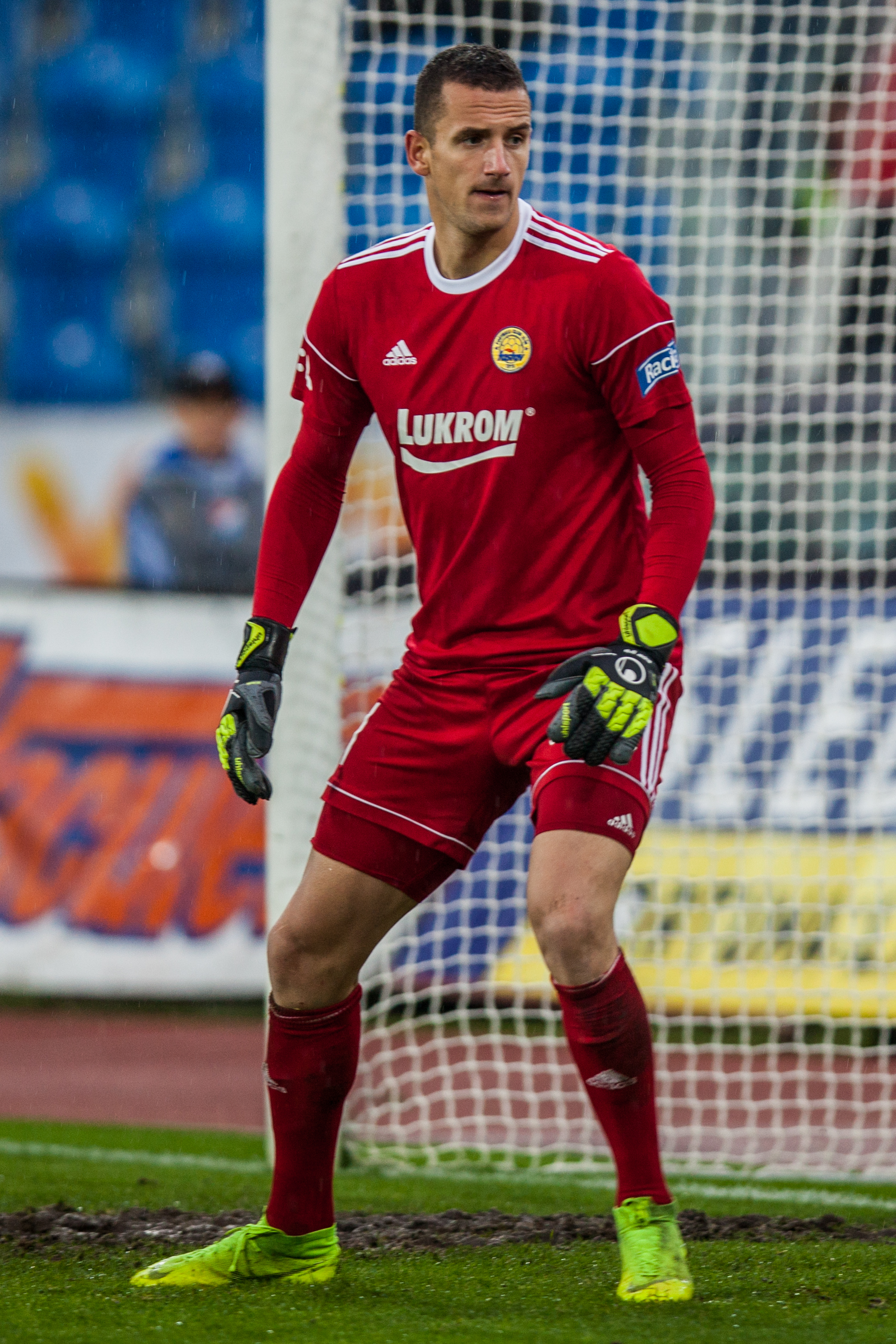

Personal information
- Full name: Matej Rakovan
- Date of birth: 14 March 1990 (age 36)
- Place of birth: Žilina, Czechoslovakia
- Height: 1.97 m (6 ft 5 1/2 in)
- Position: Goalkeeper

Youth career
- Žilina

Senior career*
Years	Team	Apps	(Gls)
2009–2013	Žilina	0	(0)
2011–2012	→ Tatran Liptovský Mikuláš (loan)	11	(0)
2012	→ Karviná (loan)	14	(0)
2013	→ Slavia Prague (loan)	1	(0)
2013–2015	Slavia Prague	14	(0)
2015–2018	Vysočina Jihlava	31	(0)
2018–2019	Dundee United	9	(0)
2019–2025	Zlín	87	(0)

International career
2011–2012	Slovakia U21	3	(0)
- * Club domestic league appearances and goals as of 4 January 2025

Matej Rakovan (born 14 March 1990) is a Slovak professional footballer who plays as a goalkeeper.

== Club career ==
=== Slavia Prague ===
In January 2013, he was loaned to Slavia Prague, where many of his former teammates played. The loan deal also included a transfer option. He made his debut in the 1st league in the last round of the 2012/13 season in a match against Vysočina Jihlava (a 1–3 defeat). After the season, Slavia exercised the option.

=== Later career ===
Rakovan signed a two-year contract with Dundee United in June 2018. He was released from his contract on 23 January 2019

On 30 January 2019, Rakovan signed a contract until the end of 2020 with FC Fastav Zlín.
