= Calum Butcher =

English footballer (born 1991)

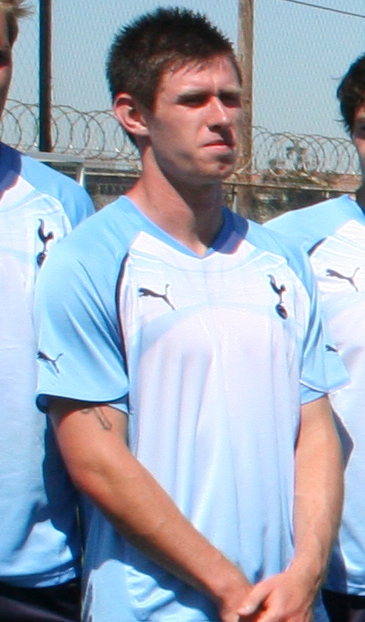
- Butcher in 2010

Personal information
- Full name: Calum James Butcher
- Date of birth: 26 February 1991 (age 35)
- Place of birth: Rochford, England
- Height: 6 ft 1 in (1.85 m)
- Position: Defender

Youth career
- Ipswich Town
- Southend United
- 2007–2009: Tottenham Hotspur

Senior career*
Years	Team	Apps	(Gls)
2009–2011	Tottenham Hotspur	0	(0)
2009	→ Barnet (loan)	3	(0)
2011–2012	Hjørring	15	(0)
2012–2013	Hayes & Yeading United	29	(1)
2013–2015	Dundee United	21	(1)
2015–2016	Burton Albion	40	(5)
2016–2017	Millwall	30	(2)
2017–2019	Mansfield Town	29	(1)
2018	→ Billericay Town (loan)	12	(0)
2019–2022	Dundee United	67	(2)
2022–2023	Burton Albion	11	(0)
2023–2024	Motherwell	30	(0)
- * Club domestic league appearances and goals as of 12:41, 12 August 2024 (UTC)

Calum James Butcher (born 26 February 1991) is an English professional footballer who plays as a defender, most recently for Motherwell.

Butcher began his career with Tottenham Hotspur, but didn't make any first team appearances, spending time on loan at Barnet. After leaving Tottenham in 2011, Butcher played for FC Hjørring in Denmark and English non-league club Hayes & Yeading United before joining Dundee United in Scotland in 2013. He then had spells with Burton Albion and Millwall before joining Mansfield in 2017. After time on loan at Billericay Town, and second spells with both Dundee United and Burton Albion, Butcher joined Motherwell in February 2023.

== Early life ==
Butcher was born in Rochford, Essex and grew up in Leigh-on-Sea. He considered Steven Gerrard as his role model while growing up. Despite starting his career at Tottenham Hotspur, Butcher grew up supporting Arsenal.

== Career ==
=== Tottenham Hotspur ===
Butcher joined Tottenham Hotspur in June 2007 after going through the youth ranks at Ipswich Town and Southend United. He was named as a substitute for Tottenham in their UEFA Cup 1–1 draw with Shakhtar Donetsk on 26 February 2009.

Butcher joined Barnet on loan in November 2009 and made his first team debut against Bournemouth in the 1–1 draw on 1 December. After two months at Barnet, it was announced that the club had allowed Butcher to return to his parent club. Butcher then went on trial at Exeter City and Southend United. At the end of the 2010–11 season, Butcher was released by Tottenham.

=== Hjørring ===
On 21 July 2011, Danish club FC Hjørring announced that Butcher had signed a one-year contract with the club. He made his debut for the club, in the opening game of the season, a 4–0 loss against Viborg FF Butcher continued to be in the first team until he received a red card in the 77th minute after a second bookable offence, in a 4–0 loss against Hobro on 29 October 2011. After that red card, Butcher, however, suffered a shoulder injury that kept him out for months. It wasn't until 28 April 2012, that he made his return from injury, in a 4–0 win over Akademisk Boldklub. Despite being sidelined twice as the 2011–12 season progressed to an end, Butcher helped the club finish in tenth place in the league.

At the end of the season, it was announced that Butcher was to be released by the club and he was expected to return to England. He was linked with a move to AaB, as well as, a move to Viborg. However, neither move happened with Butcher opting not to stay in Denmark in the summer.

=== Hayes & Yeading United ===
On 7 September 2012, Butcher returned to England with his new club Hayes & Yeading United and he went straight into the squad for the following day's match against Dover Athletic. He started the match, as Hayes & Yeading won 1–0. He scored his first goal for the club, in the third round qualifying of the FA Cup, with a 2–1 win over Salisbury City. On 30 March 2013, Butcher scored his first league goal, in a 4–1 loss against Billericay Town. At the end of the season, Butcher left the club.

=== Dundee United ===
After leaving Hayes & Yeading United, Butcher joined Dundee United on trial, along with former teammate Kudus Oyenuga. The next day, Manager Jackie McNamara said both Oyenuga and Butcher had impressed during the trial and hinted they might earn a contract. On 4 July 2013, Butcher signed a contract until May 2015 with Dundee United. He made his competitive debut for the Terrors in the opening Scottish Premiership match versus Partick Thistle at Firhill Stadium in Glasgow. The match ended 0–0. Butcher started in an away league match against United's local Tayside rivals St Johnstone but was sent off for a last man challenge on striker Stevie May. May converted the resulting penalty. He would then only make one further appearance for the first team that season. Butcher was soon sidelined with a fractured foot, ruling him out of the remainder of the season, but the club's assistant coach Simon Donnelly insisted he could make an impact the following season.

Ten months later, Butcher made a surprise return to the first team in a 3–0 win over St Mirren. As a result, he switched position from defence to midfield, He managed to get a run of games in the team and scored his first goal for the club in a 2–1 defeat to St Johnstone, nearly a year on from the match where he was sent off. In the quarter-final of the Scottish Cup against Celtic, Butcher was involved in an incident, which resulted in teammate Paul Paton being sent-off, in a 1–1 draw. In the end, the Scottish FA decided not take action against Butcher, meaning that he was available to play in the Scottish League Cup final. The Scottish FA's decision was to allow Butcher to play was criticised by Celtic. He started in the final, playing as a central-midfield, as Dundee United lost 2–0 to Celtic. His return to the first team saw him make fifteen appearances, scoring once in the 2014–15 season.

With his contract expiring at the end of the 2014–15 season, Butcher was offered a new contract. He stated that the contract had to acceptable for him must be right or he would leave the club. Butcher eventually turned down a new contract, saying that he wasn't happy with the contract length he was offered.

=== Burton Albion ===
After turning down a new contract with Dundee United, Butcher joined Burton Albion in June 2015, on a two-year contract. Upon joining the club, he was given number twelve shirt for the new season. After being an unused substitute in the first two matches of the season, Butcher made his Burton Albion debut in the first round of the League Cup, in a 1–0 win over Bolton Wanderers. Seven days later, on 18 August 2015, he made his league debut for the club, in a 2–1 win over Blackpool. Butcher soon became a first team regular, but continued to find himself picking yellow cards several times throughout the season. Nevertheless, Butcher scored his first goals on 19 October 2015, in a 3–3 draw against Doncaster Rovers. Later in the 2015–16 season, he went on to score four more goals, against Coventry City, Chesterfield and Port Vale. After scoring five times in forty–three appearances in all competitions, he helped Burton gain promotion to the Championship as they clinched second place in League One.

Ahead of the 2016–17 season, Butcher was expected to play as a striker by Manager Nigel Clough, which he did once in the last game of the season against Doncaster Rovers. Butcher scored his first goal of the season, in the first round of the League Cup, in a 3–2 win over Bury. However, his first team opportunities became increasingly limited, due to playing in a number of different positions and new summer signings being preferred.

=== Millwall ===
On 25 August 2016 Butcher joined Millwall from Burton, signing a two–year contract. Two days after signing for the club, he made his Millwall debut on 27 August 2016, coming on as a late substitute, in a 3–1 win over Chesterfield. After joining Millwall, Butcher became a first team regular, playing as a box to box midfielder. He said this was one of the reasons he joined the club as he felt this was his best position. He then scored his first goal for the club on 15 October 2016, in a 3–1 win over Northampton Town. His second goal for the club came on 26 November 2016, in a 3–2 win over Bury.

=== Mansfield Town ===
Butcher joined EFL League Two club Mansfield Town in August 2017 after being released from his Millwall contract.

Butcher joined Billericay Town on loan in January 2018. He was transfer-listed by Mansfield at the end of the 2017–18 season.

=== Dundee United (Second spell) ===
Butcher resigned for Dundee United in the January 2019 transfer window. By November 2019, he had scored four goals in his second spell at the club and was described by Dundee United's website as "one of the first names on the teamsheet" On 28 November 2019, it was announced he had signed a new contract, which would see him stay at the club until at least 2023, with Butcher describing the club as "a great place to be right now" and stating that he could "see something great happening here".

In January 2020, Butcher was named as Scottish Championship Player of the Month for December 2019.

=== Burton Albion (Second spell) ===
Butcher resigned for Burton Albion on a two-year deal in July 2022 Butcher left Burton Albion by mutual consent on 3 February 2023.

=== Motherwell ===
On 4 February 2023, Butcher signed for Motherwell on a contract until the summer of 2024. On 24 May 2024, Motherwell announced Butcher would leave the club at the end of the season when his contract expired.

== Personal life ==
Butcher is a father of two children.

== Honours ==
Millwall

- EFL League One play-offs: 2017

Individual

- Scottish Championship Player of the Month: December 2019
