= List of Cove Rangers F.C. seasons =

Cove Rangers Football Club, a senior association football club based in Cove Bay, Aberdeen, Scotland, was founded in 1922. Cove originally played in the Aberdeen Juvenile League before becoming original member of the Aberdeenshire Amateur Football Association in 1947. In 1985 the club became a junior team, and then successfully applied to join the senior Highland Football League in 1986, the joint-highest tier of non-league football in Scotland, along with the Lowland Football League, and joint-fifth tier overall in the Scottish football league system. They spent 33 consecutive seasons in the Highland League, winning the competition seven times.

The 2014–15 season saw the introduction of a play-off competition where the champions of the Highland and Lowland Leagues would play each other and the winner plays the club that finished in last place of Scottish League Two, the fourth tier of the Scottish Professional Football League, for a chance to take their place for the following season. If the League Two club wins they retain their league status. All play-off matches are two-legged ties. Cove Rangers first entered the play-offs when they won the 2015–16 Highland Football League, they lost to the Lowland League champions Edinburgh City 4–1 on aggregate in the semi-final. Their next chance at promotion was in the 2017–18 season, they beat The Spartans in the semi-final but lost 3–1 on aggregate to League Two side Cowdenbeath. They won the play-offs in their third attempt after winning the 2018–19 Highland Football League, they beat East Kilbride in the semi-final and Berwick Rangers in the final with a 7–0 aggregate win, earning promotion to the 2019–20 Scottish League Two.

The club's first season in a professional league was a successful one, they played 28 games, won 22, drew two and lost four. The season was suspended on the 13 March 2020 due to the COVID-19 pandemic, and curtailed on the 15 April with the points per game earned by each team to date used to determine the final standings, which resulted in the club finishing in first place, therefore winning the League Two title and earning a second consecutive promotion to League One.

Cove qualified to enter the Scottish Cup nine times before becoming full members of the Scottish Football Association and qualifying automatically each season from 2007–08. Their best run in the cup was reaching the fifth round in the 2017–18 season. After their promotion to League Two in 2019 the club was eligible to participate in the League Cup and Challenge Cup, being eliminated in the group stage and third round respectively.

As at the end of 2020–21, the club's first team had spent 2 seasons in the SPFL and 33 in non-League football (North Junior League and Highland League). The table details their achievements in first-team competitions for each completed season since their first appearance in the Junior League in 1985–86. This list does not include their seasons in local amateur leagues before 1985.

== Key ==
Key to divisions

- Aberdeenshire Amateur League = Aberdeenshire Amateur Football Association League Division One
- North Junior League East Two = North Junior Football League East Section Division Two
- Highland League = Highland Football League
- SPFL League One = Scottish League One
- SPFL League Two = Scottish League Two

Key to positions and symbols

- 1st = Champions
- 2nd = Runners-up
- ↑ = Promoted
- ↓ = Relegated

Key to rounds

- Group = Group stage
- R1 = First round, etc.
- — = Did not enter or qualify for the competition
- N/A = Not eligible to enter the competition

== Seasons ==
Season	League record									Scottish Cup	League Cup	Challenge Cup
Season	Division	P	W	D	L	F	A	Pts	Pos	Scottish Cup	League Cup	Challenge Cup
1947–48	Aberdeenshire Amateur League Division One								1st	—	N/A (Note: As not a member of Scottish League, Cove Rangers were not eligible to participate in the League Cup or Challenge Cup.)	N/A (Note: As not a member of Scottish League, Cove Rangers were not eligible to participate in the League Cup or Challenge Cup.)
1948–49	Aberdeenshire Amateur League Division One								1st	—	N/A	N/A
1949–50	Aberdeenshire Amateur League Division One									—	N/A	N/A
1950–51	Aberdeenshire Amateur League Division One									—	N/A	N/A
1951–52	Aberdeenshire Amateur League Division One									—	N/A	N/A
1952–53	Aberdeenshire Amateur League Division One									—	N/A	N/A
1953–54	Aberdeenshire Amateur League Division One								1st	—	N/A	N/A
1954–55	Aberdeenshire Amateur League Division One								1st	—	N/A	N/A
1955–56	Aberdeenshire Amateur League Division One								1st	—	N/A	N/A
1956–57	Aberdeenshire Amateur League Division One								1st	—	N/A	N/A
1957–58	Aberdeenshire Amateur League Division One								1st	—	N/A	N/A
1958–59	Aberdeenshire Amateur League Division One									—	N/A	N/A
1959–60	Aberdeenshire Amateur League Division One								1st	—	N/A	N/A
1960–61	Aberdeenshire Amateur League Division One								1st	—	N/A	N/A
1961–62	Aberdeenshire Amateur League Division One									—	N/A	N/A
1962–63	Aberdeenshire Amateur League Division One									—	N/A	N/A
1963–64	Aberdeenshire Amateur League Division One									—	N/A	N/A
1964–65	Aberdeenshire Amateur League Division One								1st	—	N/A	N/A
1965–66	Aberdeenshire Amateur League Division One									—	N/A	N/A
1966–67	Aberdeenshire Amateur League Division One									—	N/A	N/A
1967–68	Aberdeenshire Amateur League Division One									—	N/A	N/A
1968–69	Aberdeenshire Amateur League Division One									—	N/A	N/A
1969–70	Aberdeenshire Amateur League Division One									—	N/A	N/A
1970–71	Aberdeenshire Amateur League Division One									—	N/A	N/A
1971–72	Aberdeenshire Amateur League Division One									—	N/A	N/A
1972–73	Aberdeenshire Amateur League Division One									—	N/A	N/A
1973–74	Aberdeenshire Amateur League Division One									—	N/A	N/A
1974–75	Aberdeenshire Amateur League Division One									—	N/A	N/A
1975–76	Aberdeenshire Amateur League Division One									—	N/A	N/A
1976–77	Aberdeenshire Amateur League Division One								1st	—	N/A	N/A
1977–78	Aberdeenshire Amateur League Division One									—	N/A	N/A
1978–79	Aberdeenshire Amateur League Division One									—	N/A	N/A
1979–80	Aberdeenshire Amateur League Division One									—	N/A	N/A
1980–81	Aberdeenshire Amateur League Division One									—	N/A	N/A
1981–82	Aberdeenshire Amateur League Division One									—	N/A	N/A
1982–83	Aberdeenshire Amateur League Division One								1st	—	N/A	N/A
1983–84	Aberdeenshire Amateur League Division One									—	N/A	N/A
1984–85	Aberdeenshire Amateur League Division One								1st	—	N/A	N/A
1985–86	North Junior League East Two	27	19	6	2	109	31	44	1st	—	N/A	N/A
1986–87	Highland League	34	17	6	11	79	58	57	8th	—	N/A	N/A
1987–88	Highland League	34	14	10	10	67	54	52	10th	—	N/A	N/A
1988–89	Highland League	34	21	6	7	71	38	69	2nd	—	N/A	N/A
1989–90	Highland League	34	17	8	9	72	59	59	6th	R1	N/A	N/A
1990–91	Highland League	34	23	2	9	95	52	71	3rd	R3	N/A	N/A
1991–92	Highland League	34	18	9	7	62	35	63	4th	—	N/A	N/A
1992–93	Highland League	34	23	4	7	78	37	73	2nd	R3	N/A	N/A
1993–94	Highland League	34	20	4	10	89	46	64	4th	R2	N/A	N/A
1994–95	Highland League	30	18	3	9	69	38	57	2nd	R3	N/A	N/A
1995–96	Highland League	30	20	5	5	74	35	65	2nd	—	N/A	N/A
1996–97	Highland League	30	15	5	10	84	47	50	7th	—	N/A	N/A
1997–98	Highland League	30	19	4	7	100	39	61	4th	—	N/A	N/A
1998–99	Highland League	30	16	5	9	88	48	53	7th	—	N/A	N/A
1999–2000	Highland League	30	12	6	12	81	54	42	8th	—	N/A	N/A
2000–01	Highland League	26	20	3	3	74	32	63	1st	R2	N/A	N/A
2001–02	Highland League	28	12	7	9	72	60	43	6th	—	N/A	N/A
2002–03	Highland League	28	14	7	7	69	46	49	4th	R2	N/A	N/A
2003–04	Highland League	28	7	6	15	45	61	27	10th	—	N/A	N/A
2004–05	Highland League	28	16	4	8	59	44	52	6th	R2	N/A	N/A
2005–06	Highland League	28	12	6	10	55	46	42	8th	R2	N/A	N/A
2006–07	Highland League	28	13	6	9	52	36	45	6th	—	N/A	N/A
2007–08	Highland League	28	19	7	2	85	33	64	1st	R4	N/A	N/A
2008–09	Highland League	28	22	4	2	96	26	70	1st	R3	N/A	N/A
2009–10	Highland League	34	23	6	5	97	42	75	2nd	R3	N/A	N/A
2010–11	Highland League	34	22	5	7	100	43	71	3rd	R3	N/A	N/A
2011–12	Highland League	34	23	7	4	92	33	76	2nd	R2	N/A	N/A
2012–13	Highland League	34	25	5	4	101	26	80	1st	R3	N/A	N/A
2013–14	Highland League	34	16	7	11	91	62	55	7th	R2	N/A	N/A
2014–15	Highland League	34	22	7	5	103	40	73	3rd	R2	N/A	N/A
2015–16	Highland League	34	29	2	3	98	28	89	1st (Note: Lost in the League Two play-off semi-final to Edinburgh City, 4–1 on aggregate.)	R4	N/A	N/A
2016–17	Highland League	34	25	7	2	109	30	82	2nd	R2	Group (Note: Cove qualify for the Scottish League Cup as 2015–16 Highland League champions.)	R2 (Note: Cove qualify for the Scottish Challenge Cup as one of the Highland League's top 4 teams from the previous season.)
2017–18	Highland League	34	29	3	2	127	22	90	1st (Note: Beat The Spartans 5–2 on aggregate in the semi-final before losing 3–2 on aggregate to Cowdenbeath in the League Two play-off final.)	R5	N/A (Note: As members of the Highland Football League, Cove Rangers were not eligible to participate in the League Cup or Challenge Cup.)	R3
2018–19	Highland League ↑	34	30	3	1	100	12	93	1st (Note: Promoted to Scottish League Two via the play-offs, beating East Kilbride 5–1 on aggregate in the semi-final and Berwick Rangers 7–0 on aggregate in the final.)	R2	Group (Note: Cove qualify for the Scottish League Cup as 2017–18 Highland League champions.)	R1
2019–20	SPFL League Two ↑	28	22	2	4	76	34	68	1st (Note: The 2019–20 Scottish League Two was curtailed due to the COVID-19 pandemic, with league positions, promotions and relegations decided on a points-per-game basis.)	R2	Group	R3
2020–21	SPFL League One	22	10	6	6	28	18	36	3rd (Note: Lost in the Championship play-off semi-final to Airdrieonians, 4–3 on aggregate.)	R3	Group	Not held
2021–22	SPFL League One ↑	36	23	10	3	73	32	41	1st	R4	Group	SF
2022–23	SPFL Championship ↓	36	7	10	19	38	75	31	10th	R4	Group	R3
2023–24	SPFL League One	36	14	7	15	58	63	49	5th	R5	Group	R3
2024–25	SPFL League One	36	16	9	11	62	44	57	2nd	R5	Group	R3
