= 2017–18 Dundee United F.C. season =

Dundee United
2017–18 season
- Chairman: Stephen Thompson (Until 2 March); Mike Martin
- Manager: Ray McKinnon (Until 24 October); Csaba László (From 8 November)
- Stadium: Tannadice Park
- Championship: 3rd
- Premiership play-off: Semi-final
- Scottish Cup: Fifth round
- League Cup: Second round
- Challenge Cup: Quarter-final
- Top goalscorer: League: Scott McDonald (15); All: Scott McDonald (16)
- Highest home attendance: 7,994 vs. Dunfermline Athletic, Premiership play-off, 4 May 2018
- Lowest home attendance: 1,655 vs. Cowdenbeath, Challenge Cup, 15 August 2017
- Average home league attendance: 5,505
Home colours	Away colours

The 2017–18 season was Dundee United's 109th season, having been founded as Dundee Hibernian in 1909. It is their second season in the Scottish Championship, having been relegated from the Scottish Premiership at the end of the 2015–16 season. United will also compete in the Challenge Cup, League Cup and Scottish Cup.

== Summary ==
=== Management ===
United began the season under the management of Ray McKinnon, who has signed a three-year contract the previous season. On 24 October 2017, following two consecutive defeats, McKinnon left his position with immediate effect. Assistant manager Laurie Ellis became caretaker manager. On 8 November, United appointed former Heart of Midlothian manager Csaba László as manager on an 18-month contract. Ellis continued as assistant manager.

== Results & fixtures ==
Win Draw Loss Postponed

=== Scottish Championship ===
5 August 2017 1	Inverness Caledonian Thistle	0–1	Dundee United	Caledonian Stadium
15:00		BBC Report	McMullan 13' (Penalty)	Attendance: 3,415; Referee: Thomson

12 August 2017 2	Dundee United	2–1	Queen of the South	Tannadice Park
15:00	McDonald 18'; McMullan (red card) 36'; Fraser 68'	BBC Report	Fordyce 25'	Attendance: 5,842; Referee: Walsh

19 August 2017 3	Dundee United	1–0	Brechin City	Tannadice Park
15:00	McDonald 80'	BBC Report		Attendance: 6,060; Referee: Anderson

26 August 2017 4	St Mirren	3–0	Dundee United	St Mirren Park
15:00	Morgan 26', 48'; McShane 78'	BBC Report		Attendance: 4,768; Referee: Clancy

9 September 2017 5	Dundee United	1–1	Dumbarton	Tannadice Park
15:00	Keatings 87'	BBC Report	Smith 4'	Attendance: 5,331; Referee: Aitken

16 September 2017 6	Falkirk	0–0	Dundee United	Falkirk Stadium
15:00		BBC Report		Attendance: 4,874; Referee: Beaton

23 September 2017 7	Dundee United	2–1	Greenock Morton	Tannadice Park
15:00	Keatings 65'; McDonald 83'	BBC Report	McHugh 75'	Attendance: 5,569; Referee: Muir

30 September 2017 8	Dunfermline Athletic	1–3	Dundee United	East End Park
15:00	Smith 77'	BBC Report	Fyvie 35', 59'; McDonald 43'	Attendance: 7,585; Referee: Robertson

14 October 2017 9	Livingston	2–0	Dundee United	Almondvale Stadium
15:00	Mullen 7'; Todorov 76'	BBC Report		Attendance: 2,282; Referee: Beaton

21 October 2017 10	Dundee United	0–2	Inverness Caledonian Thistle	Tannadice Park
15:00		BBC Report	Vigurs 28'; Bell 36'	Attendance: 5,560; Referee: Collum

28 October 2017 11	Dumbarton	0–2	Dundee United	Dumbarton Football Stadium
15:00	Barr (yellow card) 63' (yellow-red card)	BBC Report	Stanton 2', 15'	Attendance: 968; Referee: Charleston

4 November 2017 12	Dundee United	2–1	St Mirren	Tannadice Park
15:00	Durnan 11'; Stanton 79'	BBC Report	Eckersley 90+3'	Attendance: 6,936; Referee: Aitken

19 November 2017 13	Dundee United	3–0	Falkirk	Tannadice Park
15:00	McDonald 21'; Robson 41'; Flood 45'	BBC Report		Attendance: Muir; Referee: 5,915

25 November 2017 14	Brechin City	1–1	Dundee United	Glebe Park
15:00	Crighton 47'	BBC Report	McDonald 29'; Scobbie (yellow card) 90+2' (yellow-red card)	Attendance: 2,627; Referee: Cook

2 December 2017 15	Dundee United	2–1	Dunfermline Athletic	Tannadice Park
15:00	Fraser 15', 42'	BBC Report	McManus 75' (Penalty)	Attendance: 5,790; Referee: Anderson

9 December 2017 16	Greenock Morton	0–2	Dundee United	Cappielow
15:00		BBC Report	King 61', 90+4'	Attendance: 2,021; Referee: Duncan

23 December 2017 17	Dundee United	3–0	Livingston	Tannadice Park
15:00	McMullan 22', 88'; McDonald 37'	BBC Report		Attendance: 6,221; Referee: Dallas

29 December 2017 18	St Mirren	2–0	Dundee United	St Mirren Park
19:45	Morgan 59', 78'	BBC Report		Attendance: 6,214; Referee: Robertson

2 January 2018 19	Dundee United	4–1	Brechin City	Tannadice Park
15:00	McDonald 1', 49'; Stanton 7'; Keatings 52' (Penalty); McMullan (yellow card) (yellow-red card) 57'	BBC Report	Sinclair 64' (Penalty)	Attendance: 5,532; Referee: Newlands

6 January 2018 20	Falkirk	6–1	Dundee United	Falkirk Stadium
15:00	Grant 21'; Tumilty 41'; Longridge 57', 73'; Robson 65'; Kidd 90'	BBC Report	King 6'	Attendance: 5,326; Referee: Walsh

13 January 2018 21	Dunfermline Athletic	0–0	Dundee United	East End Park
15:00		BBC Report		Attendance: 7,139; Referee: Madden

27 January 2018 22	Dundee United	0–3	Greenock Morton	Tannadice Park
15:00		BBC Report	O'Ware 35'; Tiffoney 47'; Iredale 80'	Attendance: 5,730; Referee: Cook

23 February 2018 23	Livingston	2–1	Dundee United	Almondvale Stadium
15:00	Robinson 22'; Hardie 90+1'	BBC Report	Smith 74'	Attendance: 1,604; Referee: Thomson

13 March 2018 24	Queen of the South	1–3	Dundee United	Palmerston Park
19:45	Thomas 21'	BBC Report	Mikkelsen 24'; M. Smith 48', 57'	Attendance: 1,480; Referee: Muir

17 March 2018 25	Dundee United	1–1	Inverness Caledonian Thistle	Tannadice Park
15:00	Mikkelsen 64'	BBC Report	Vigurs 30'	Attendance: 4,772; Referee: Kirkland

20 March 2018 26	Dundee United	2–3	Queen of the South	Tannadice Park
19:45	Durnan 57'; McDonald 68'	BBC Report	Thomson 21', 75'; Jacobs 41' (pen.)	Attendance: 4,088; Referee: Duncan

24 March 2018 27	Dundee United	1–1	Dunfermline Athletic	Tannadice Park
15:00	McDonald 55'	BBC Report	Clark 52'	Attendance: 5,830; Referee: Anderson

27 March 2018 28	Inverness Caledonian Thistle	1–0	Dundee United	Caledonian Stadium
19:45	Doran 44'	BBC Report		Attendance: 2,328; Referee: Aitken

31 March 2018 29	Greenock Morton	1–1	Dundee United	Cappielow
15:00	Ross 90+3'	BBC Report	Mohsni 59'	Attendance: 2,319; Referee: Robertson

3 April 2018 30	Dundee United	2–0	Dumbarton	Tannadice Park
19:45	Ralston (yellow card) 19'; McMullen 30'; Mohsni 45+1'; Smith (yellow card) 49'	Report	Hutton (yellow card) 45'	Attendance: 3,620; Referee: Kevin Clancy

7 April 2018 31	Dumbarton	3–2	Dundee United	Dumbarton Football Stadium
15:00	Gallagher 11'; Dick (yellow card) 57'; Barr 59', 79'	Report	Flood (yellow card) 5'; Ralston 51'; McDonald 70'	Attendance: 994; Referee: Steven McLean

10 April 2018 32	Dundee United	1–0	St Mirren	Tannadice Park
19:45	King 3'; Mikkelsen (yellow card) 24'; McMullan (yellow card) 41'; Durnan (yellow card) 45'; Gillespie (yellow card) 74'	BBC Sport	McGinn (yellow card) 24'; Davis (yellow card) 65'; Morgan (yellow card) 82'	Attendance: 5,905; Referee: Andrew Dallas

14 April 2018 33	Dundee United	1–0	Falkirk	Tannadice Park
15:00	Mikkelsen 7', (yellow card) 44'	Report	Watson (yellow card) 65'; Kidd (yellow card) 75'; Muirhead (yellow card) 89'	Attendance: 5,170; Referee: Craig Thomson

17 April 2018 34	Brechin City	0–5	Dundee United	Glebe Park
15:00	Dale (yellow card) 19'; Spark (yellow card) 73'; Tapping (yellow card) 76'; McLean (yellow card) 80'	SPFL report	Gillespie (yellow card) 42'; McDonald 51', 79'; King 56'; Fraser 81'; Mohsni 88'	Attendance: 1,427; Referee: Craig Charleston

21 April 2018 35	Queen of the South	3–0	Dundee United	Palmerston Park
15:00	Dykes 9'; Thomson 31'; Mercer (yellow card) 62'; Thomas (yellow card) 66'; Murray 77'; Marshall (yellow card) 83'	Report	Stanton (yellow card) 86'; Murdoch (yellow card) 90+4'	Attendance: 1,531; Referee: Alan Newlands

28 April 2018 36	Dundee United	2–0	Livingston	Tannadice Park
15:00	Mohsni (yellow card) 35'; Slater 54'; McDonald 85'	Report		Attendance: 5,226; Referee: Greg Aitken

=== Premiership play-off ===
1 May 2018 Quarter-final 1st Leg	Dunfermline Athletic	0–0	Dundee United	East End Park
19:45	Ashcroft (red card) 55'	BBC Report		Attendance: 6,474; Referee: Bobby Madden

4 May 2018 Quarter-final 2nd Leg	Dundee United	2–1 (2–1 agg.)	Dunfermline Athletic	Tannadice Park
19:45	McDonald 57'; Stanton 70'	BBC Report	McManus 14'	Attendance: 7,994; Referee: Willie Collum

7 May 2018 Semi-final 1st Leg	Dundee United	2–3	Livingston	Tannadice Park
19:45	Mikkelsen 3'; Ralston 28'; Flood (red card) 87'	BBC Report	De Vita 2'; Mullin 77'; Pittman 80'	Attendance: 5,610; Referee: Nick Walsh

11 May 2018 Semi-final 2nd Leg	Livingston	1–1 (4–3 agg.)	Dundee United	Almondvale Stadium
19:45	Lithgow 6'	BBC Report	Fraser 21'	Attendance: 4,508; Referee: Don Robertson

=== Scottish League Cup ===
==== Group stage ====
15 July 2017 1	Dundee United	2–0	Raith Rovers	Tannadice Park
15:00	McMullen 59'; Keatings 72' (Penalty)	BBC Report		Attendance: 3,753; Referee: McLean

19 July 2017 2	Buckie Thistle	0–3	Dundee United	Victoria Park
20:00		BBC Report	McMullan 17'; King 21'; Durnan 34'	Attendance: 1,200; Referee: Beaton

23 July 2017 3	Dundee United	4–1	Cowdenbeath	Tannadice Park
15:00	Stanton 30'; King 46'; Frazer 67' (Penalty); Smith 80'	BBC Report	Muirhead 76'	Attendance: 3,253; Referee: Newlands

30 July 2017 4	Dundee	1–1 (3–4 p)	Dundee United	Dens Park
15:00	O'Hara 60'	BBC Report	McMullan 45'	Attendance: 10,460; Referee: Clancy
	Penalties
	El Bakhtaoui (penalty missed); Wolters (penalty scored); Moussa (penalty scored); O'Dea (penalty scored); Deacon (penalty missed)		(penalty scored) McMullan; (penalty scored) King; (penalty scored) Toshney; (penalty missed) Chalmers; (penalty scored) McDonald

==== Knockout phase ====
9 August 2017 Second round	Dundee	2–1	Dundee United	Dens Park
19:45	El Bakhtaoui 30'; McGowan 64'	BBC Report	King 40'	Attendance: 10,472; Referee: McLean

=== Scottish Challenge Cup ===
15 August 2017 First round	Dundee United	2–0	Cowdenbeath	Tannadice Park
19:45	N'Koyi 61', 67'	SPFL Report		Attendance: 1,655; Referee: Northcroft

2 September 2017 Second round	Dundee United	3–1	Alloa Athletic	Tannadice Park
15:00	N'Koyi 72' (Penalty); McMullan 90+1'; Flood 90+3'	SPFL Report	Cawley 78'	Attendance: 1,763; Referee: Collum

7 October 2017 Third round	Dundee United	1–0	(Northern Ireland) Linfield	Tannadice Park
17:15	Chalmers 90+5'	SPFL Report		Attendance: 1,967; Referee: Griffith

11 November 2017 Quarter-final	Dundee United	1–2	(Northern Ireland) Crusaders	Tannadice Park
13:00	Fyvie 55'	SPFL Report	Cushley 67'; Whyte 90+1'	Attendance: 2,048; Referee: Hennessy

=== Scottish Cup ===
20 January 2018 Fourth round	Alloa Athletic	0–2	Dundee United	Recreation Park
15:00		BBC Report	Durnan 44'; Lyng 62'	Attendance: 1,615; Referee: Charleston

11 February 2018 Fifth Round	Aberdeen	4–2	Dundee United	Pittodrie Stadium
16:30	Rooney 20'; Mackay-Steven 27', 55'; McLean 35'	BBC Report	Stanton 34'; McMullan 70'	Attendance: 11,611; Referee: Willie Collum

== Squad statistics ==
During the 2017–18 season, United used forty players in competitive games. The table below shows the number of appearances and goals scored by each player.

=== Appearances ===
As of 11 May 2018

No.	Pos	Nat	Player	Total		Championship		League Cup		Scottish Cup		Other	
No.	Pos	Nat	Player	Apps	Goals	Apps	Goals	Apps	Goals	Apps	Goals	Apps	Goals
2	MF	(Scotland) SCO	Stewart Murdoch	36	0	25+2	0	0+1	0	1+1	0	5+1	0
3	DF	(Scotland) SCO	Tam Scobbie	24	0	18+1	0	4+1	0	0+0	0	0+0	0
4	DF	(Scotland) SCO	Mark Durnan	36	4	26+1	2	4+0	1	2+0	1	1+2	0
5	DF	(Scotland) SCO	Paul Quinn	19	0	12+4	0	0+0	0	1+0	0	2+0	0
6	DF	(Scotland) SCO	Lewis Toshney	10	0	4+0	0	5+0	0	0+0	0	1+0	0
7	FW	(Scotland) SCO	Paul McMullan	40	9	22+8	4	5+0	3	0+1	1	3+1	1
8	MF	(Australia) AUS	Scott McDonald	42	16	31+3	15	1+1	0	1+1	0	4+0	1
9	FW	(Denmark) DEN	Thomas Mikkelsen	19	4	9+4	3	0+0	0	1+1	0	3+1	1
10	MF	(Scotland) SCO	Scott Fraser	32	6	14+9	4	3+1	1	0+0	0	5+0	1
11	MF	(Scotland) SCO	Billy King	48	8	32+3	5	5+0	3	2+0	0	4+2	0
12	MF	(Scotland) SCO	Sam Stanton	48	7	32+3	4	4+1	1	2+0	1	4+2	1
14	DF	(France) FRA	William Edjenguélé	20	0	9+4	0	5+0	0	0+0	0	2+0	0
15	MF	(Scotland) SCO	Craig Slater	9	1	3+4	1	0+0	0	2+0	0	0+0	0
16	MF	(Republic of Ireland) IRL	Willo Flood	38	2	26+4	1	0+1	0	2+0	0	5+0	1
17	DF	(Scotland) SCO	Jamie Robson	38	1	30+0	1	2+1	0	2+0	0	3+0	0
19	FW	(Scotland) SCO	James Keatings	21	4	8+8	3	2+1	1	0+0	0	2+0	0
20	MF	(Netherlands) NED	Jordie Briels	16	0	6+4	0	5+0	0	0+0	0	1+0	0
21	GK	(Turkey) TUR	Deniz Mehmet	13	0	6+0	0	1+0	0	0+0	0	6+0	0
22	FW	(France) FRA	Idris Kadded	2	0	0+1	0	0+0	0	0+1	0	0+0	0
23	MF	(Scotland) SCO	Fraser Fyvie	17	3	14+1	2	0+0	0	1+0	0	1+0	1
24	MF	(Scotland) SCO	Grant Gillespie	9	0	5+1	0	0+0	0	1+0	0	2+0	0
25	GK	(England) ENG	Harry Lewis	39	0	30+0	0	4+0	0	2+0	0	2+1	0
27	MF	(France) FRA	Logan Martin	1	0	0+1	0	0+0	0	0+0	0	0+0	0
28	FW	(Scotland) SCO	Matty Smith	22	5	8+9	3	1+0	1	1+0	1	1+2	0
29	MF	(Scotland) SCO	Anthony Ralston	15	1	11+0	0	0+0	0	0+0	0	4+0	1
32	DF	(England) ENG	Brandon Mason	2	0	1+0	0	0+0	0	0+1	0	0+0	0
33	DF	(Scotland) SCO	Harvey Dailly	3	0	0+0	0	0+0	0	0+0	0	2+1	0
34	DF	(Scotland) SCO	Gavin Ritchie	2	0	0+0	0	0+0	0	0+0	0	2+0	0
35	DF	(Scotland) SCO	Scott Reekie	1	0	0+0	0	0+0	0	0+0	0	0+1	0
36	FW	(Scotland) SCO	Louis Appéré	1	0	0+0	0	0+0	0	0+0	0	0+1	0
38	FW	(Scotland) SCO	Logan Chalmers	7	1	0+2	0	0+0	0	0+2	0	2+1	1
43	MF	(Scotland) SCO	Declan Glass	2	0	0+2	0	0+0	0	0+0	0	0+0	0
44	MF	(England) ENG	Archie Thomas	4	0	0+0	0	0+1	0	0+0	0	2+1	0
46	FW	(England) ENG	Joe Piggott	2	0	0+0	0	0+0	0	0+0	0	2+0	0
58	FW	(Denmark) DEN	Emil Lyng	11	1	3+3	0	0+0	0	2+1	1	0+2	0
91	DF	(Tunisia) TUN	Bilel Mohsni	14	3	10+0	3	0+0	0	0+0	0	4+0	0
Players who left the club during the 2017–18 season
9	FW	(Democratic Republic of the Congo) COD	Patrick N'Koyi	14	3	0+8	0	1+1	0	0+0	0	4+0	3
18	MF	(Scotland) SCO	Scott Allardice	12	0	1+3	0	2+2	0	0+0	0	4+0	0
26	DF	(Scotland) SCO	Cammy Ballantyne	2	0	0+1	0	0+1	0	0+0	0	0+0	0
31	MF	(Scotland) SCO	Graham Taylor	3	0	0+0	0	0+0	0	0+0	0	3+0	0
39	DF	(Scotland) SCO	Jordan Hornby	2	0	0+0	0	0+0	0	0+0	0	2+0	0

a. Includes other competitive competitions, including the play-offs and the Challenge Cup.

== Club statistics ==
=== League table ===
Pos	Team	Pld	W	D	L	GF	GA	GD	Pts	Promotion, qualification or relegation
1	St Mirren (C, P)	36	23	5	8	63	36	+27	74	Promotion to the Premiership
2	Livingston (O, P)	36	17	11	8	56	37	+19	62	Qualification for the Premiership play-off semi-final
3	Dundee United	36	18	7	11	52	42	+10	61	Qualification for the Premiership play-off quarter-final
4	Dunfermline Athletic	36	16	11	9	60	35	+25	59	Qualification for the Premiership play-off quarter-final
5	Inverness Caledonian Thistle	36	16	9	11	53	37	+16	57	

Source: Soccerway
Rules for classification: 1) Points; 2) Goal difference; 3) Goals scored; 4) Points in head-to-head matches; 5) Goal difference in hth matches; 6). Goals scored in hth matches; 7). Play-off (only for deciding promotion, play-off participation and relegation).
(C) Champions; (O) Play-off winners; (P) Promoted

=== Division summary ===
Round	1	2	3	4	5	6	7	8	9	10	11	12	13	14	15	16	17	18	19	20	21	22	23	24	25	26	27	28	29	30	31	32	33	34	35	36
Ground	A	H	H	A	H	A	H	A	A	H	A	H	H	A	H	A	H	A	H	A	A	H	A	A	H	H	H	A	A	H	A	H	H	A	A	H
Result	W	W	W	L	D	D	W	W	L	L	W	W	W	D	W	W	W	L	W	L	D	L	L	W	D	L	D	L	D	W	L	W	W	W	L	W
Position	3	1	1	4	4	4	3	2	4	4	4	2	2	2	1	1	1	1	2	2	2	2	2	2	2	3	3	3	2	2	2	3	3	3	3	3

Updated to match(es) played on 27 April 2018. Source:
A = Away; H = Home; W = Win; D = Draw; L = Loss

==== League Cup table ====
Pos	Team	Pld	W	PW	PL	L	GF	GA	GD	Pts	Qualification	DUN	DND	RAI	COW	BUC
1	Dundee United (Q)	4	3	1	0	0	10	2	+8	11	Qualification for the Second Round	—	—	2–0	4–1	—
2	Dundee (Q)	4	3	0	1	0	8	2	+6	10	Qualification for the Second Round	1–1p	—	—	—	2–0
3	Raith Rovers	4	2	0	0	2	9	5	+4	6		—	1–2	—	2–0	—
4	Cowdenbeath	4	1	0	0	3	5	11	−6	3		—	0–3	—	—	4–2
5	Buckie Thistle	4	0	0	0	4	3	15	−12	0		0–3	—	1–6	—	—

Rules for classification: 1) goal difference, 2) goals scored, 3) away goals scored, 4) matches won, 5) away matches won, 6) drawing of lots.
(Q) Qualified to the phase indicated

=== Management statistics ===
Last updated 21 March 2018

Name	From	To	P	W	D	L	Win% (Note: Win% is the percentage of matches won rounded to two decimal places.)
Ray McKinnon	15 July 2017	22 October 2017	18	11	3	4	61.11
Laurie Ellis	22 October 2017	8 November 2017	2	2	0	0	100.00
Csaba László	8 November 2017	Present	24	11	5	8	45.83

== Transfers ==
=== Players in ===
Player	From	Fee
(Scotland) James Keatings	(Scotland) Hibernian	Free
(Scotland) Billy King	(Scotland) Heart of Midlothian	Free
(Scotland) Tam Scobbie	(Scotland) St Johnstone	Free
(Scotland) Paul McMullan	(Scotland) Celtic	Free
(Democratic Republic of the Congo) Patrick N'Koyi	(Thailand) Sukhothai	Free
(Netherlands) Jordie Briels	(Netherlands) Fortuna Sittard	Free
(Turkey) Deniz Mehmet	(England) Port Vale	Free
(Australia) Scott McDonald	(Scotland) Motherwell	Free
(Scotland) Fraser Fyvie	(Scotland) Hibernian	Free
(Scotland) Paul Quinn	(Scotland) Ross County	Free
(England) Joe Piggott	(England) Rochdale	Undisclosed
(Denmark) Emil Lyng	(Iceland) KA	Free
(France) Idris Kadded	(France) Vaulx-en-Velin	Free
(France) Logan Martin	(Italy) Genoa	Free
(Scotland) Grant Gillespie	(Scotland) Hamilton Academical	Free
(Tunisia) Bilel Mohsni	Free agent	Free

=== Players out ===
Player	To	Fee
(Scotland) Simon Murray	(Scotland) Hibernian	Free
(Germany) Luis Zwick	(Germany) Hansa Rostock	Free
(Portugal) Wato Kuaté	(Israel) Hapoel Petah Tikva	Free
(Netherlands) Frank van der Struijk	(Netherlands) ODC Boxtel	Free
(Scotland) Jordan Garden	(Scotland) Cowdenbeath	Free
(Republic of Ireland) Seán Dillon	(Scotland) Montrose	Free
(Scotland) Paul Dixon	(England) Grimsby Town	Free
(Scotland) Charlie Telfer	(Netherlands) Almere City	Free
(Scotland) Blair Spittal	(Scotland) Partick Thistle	Free
(Scotland) Ali Coote	(England) Brentford	Undisclosed
(Scotland) Cammy Bell	(Scotland) Kilmarnock	Free
(Scotland) Coll Donaldson	(Scotland) Inverness Caledonian Thistle	Free
(Scotland) Brad Smith	(Scotland) Cowdenbeath	Free
(Democratic Republic of the Congo) Patrick N'Koyi	(Netherlands) TOP Oss	Free
(England) Joe Piggott	(England) Warrington Town	Free
(Scotland) Jordan Hornby	(Scotland) Cowdenbeath	Free

=== Loans in ===
Player	From	Fee
(Scotland) Sam Stanton	(Scotland) Hibernian	Loan
(England) Harry Lewis	(England) Southampton	Loan
(Scotland) Craig Slater	(England) Colchester United	Loan
(England) Brandon Mason	(England) Watford	Loan
(Denmark) Thomas Mikkelsen	(Scotland) Ross County	Loan
(Scotland) Anthony Ralston	(Scotland) Celtic	Loan

=== Loans out ===
Player	To	Fee
(Scotland) Cammy Ballantyne	(Scotland) Montrose	Loan
(Scotland) Graham Taylor	(Scotland) Edinburgh City	Loan
(Scotland) Scott Allardice	(Scotland) East Fife	Loan

== See also ==
- List of Dundee United F.C. seasons
