= 2016–17 Dundee United F.C. season =

Dundee United
2016–17 season
- Chairman: Stephen Thompson
- Manager: Ray McKinnon
- Stadium: Tannadice Park
- Championship: Third place
- Premiership play-off: Runners-up
- League Cup: Quarter-final
- Challenge Cup: Winners
- Scottish Cup: Fourth round
- Top goalscorer: League: Tony Andreu (13); All: Tony Andreu (19)
- Highest home attendance: 10,925 v Hibernian, Championship, 2 December 2016
- Lowest home attendance: 3,360 v Cowdenbeath, League Cup, 19 July 2016
- Average home league attendance: 6,584
Home colours	Away colours	Third colours

The 2016–17 season is Dundee United's 108th season, having been founded as Dundee Hibernian in 1909. It marked their first season of play outside the top tier of Scottish football since season 1995–96 and their first season in the Scottish Championship. United also competed in the Challenge Cup, League Cup, Scottish Cup and the Scottish Premiership play-offs.

== Summary ==
=== Season ===
United finished third in the Scottish Championship, entering the Scottish Premiership play-offs. They reached the Quarter-final of the League Cup, the fourth round of the Scottish Cup and were crowned champions of the Challenge Cup beating St Mirren in the final.

=== Management ===
United were managed by Ray McKinnon, during the 2016–17 season. Following the club's relegation at the end of the previous season manager Mixu Paatelainen departed the club during the close season on 4 May 2016. On 12 May 2016, McKinnon was appointed manager on a three-year contract, after compensation was agreed with his previous club Raith Rovers. He had resigned from Raith Rovers on 11 May.

== Results and fixtures ==
Win Draw Loss Postponed

=== Friendlies ===
5 July 2016 Friendly	Forfar Athletic	1 – 1	Dundee United	Station Park
19:45	Cox 14'		Johnson 86'	Attendance: 1,623; Referee: Cook

9 July 2016 Forfarshire Cup	Brechin City	0 – 5	Dundee United	Glebe Park
14:00			Johnson 6'; Fraser 33'; Spittal 40'; Murray 42'; Murray 77'	Attendance: 923; Referee: Steven Traynor

=== Scottish Championship ===
6 August 2016 Championship	Dundee United	1 – 1	Queen of the South	Tannadice Park
15:00	van der Velden 58'	QOSFC Report; BBC Sport Report	Millar 40'	Attendance: 7,058; Referee: Andrew Dallas; Man of the Match: Millar

13 August 2016 Championship	Dumbarton	1 – 0	Dundee United	Dumbarton Football Stadium
15:00	Docherty 54' (pen.)	SPFL Report		Attendance: 1,475; Referee: Gavin Duncan; Man of the Match: Mark Docherty

20 August 2016 Championship	Dundee United	3 – 0	Ayr United	Tannadice Park
15:00	Murray 18'; Robson 37'; Flood 73'	BBC Report		Attendance: 6,427; Referee: Greg Aitken; Man of the Match: Jamie Robson

27 August 2016 Championship	Dundee United	2 – 2	Raith Rovers	Tannadice Park
15:00	Flood 17'; C.Smith 23' (pen.)	BBC Report	Thompson 38'; McHattie 72'	Attendance: 7,434; Referee: Craig Thomson

10 September 2016 Championship	Dunfermline Athletic	1 – 3	Dundee United	Dunfermline, Scotland
15:00	Paton 50'	SPFL Report	Murray 21'; Andreu 45' 90+2'; Dixon (yellow card) 61' (red card)	Stadium: East End Park; Attendance: 5,563; Referee: Beaton

17 September 2016 Championship	Falkirk	3 – 1	Dundee United	Falkirk Stadium
15:00	Baird 18'; Hippolyte 87'; Miller 89'	BBC Report	Tope Obadeyi 33'	Attendance: 5,488; Referee: Crawford Allan; Man of the Match: Willo Flood

24 September 2016 Championship	Dundee United	2 – 1	Greenock Morton	Tannadice Park
15:00	Andreu 64', 90+1'	report	Dillon 90+4' (o.g.)	Stadium: Tannadice Park; Attendance: 5,829; Referee: Barry Cook

2 October 2016 Championship	Hibernian	1 – 1	Dundee United	Easter Road
12:00	Keatings 35'	BBC Report	Edjenguele 68'	Attendance: 15,492; Referee: Thomson

15 October 2016 Championship	St Mirren	0 – 2	Dundee United	St Mirren Park
15:00		BBC Report	Fraser 38'; Andreu 74'	Attendance: 3,612; Referee: Nick Walsh

22 October 2016 Championship	Dundee United	2 – 1	Dumbarton	Tannadice Park
15:00	Buchanan 53' (o.g.); Edjenguélé 66'	SPFL Report	Thomson 73'	Attendance: 5,979; Referee: Craig Charleston

29 October 2016 Championship	Dundee United	1 – 0	Falkirk	Tannadice Park
15:00	Durnan 82'	BBC Report		Attendance: 7,079; Referee: Euan Anderson; Man of the Match: Mark Durnan

5 November 2016 Championship	Queen of the South	1 – 4	Dundee United	Palmerston Park
15:00	Anderson 45'	BBC Report	Durnan 14'; Andreu 22'; Fraser 57'; Murray 77'	Attendance: 2,316; Referee: McLean; Man of the Match: Marshall

8 November 2016 Championship	Dundee United	1 – 0	Dunfermline Athletic	Dundee, Scotland
19:45	Murray 79'	SPFL report	Wedderburn (red card) 39'	Stadium: Tannadice Park; Attendance: 5,996; Referee: Robertson

19 November 2016 Championship	Greenock Morton	0 – 0	Dundee United	Cappielow Park
15:00		report		Stadium: Cappielow Park; Attendance: 2,578; Referee: Crawford Allan

2 December 2016 Championship	Dundee United	1 – 0	Hibernian	Tannadice Park
19:45	Andreu 73' (pen.)	BBC Report		Attendance: 10.925

10 December 2016 Championship	Ayr United	0 – 1	Dundee United	Somerset Park
15:00		BBC Report	Obadeyi 6'	Attendance: 2,049; Referee: Willie Collum; Man of the Match: Jamie Robson

17 December 2016 Championship	Raith Rovers	0 – 0	Dundee United	Stark's Park
15:00		BBC Report	Toshney (yellow card) 55' (red card)	Attendance: 4,361; Referee: Steven Kirkland

24 December 2016 Championship	Dundee United	2 – 1	St Mirren	Tannadice Park
15:00	Fraser 28'; Murray 45'	BBC Report	Sutton 27'	Attendance: 7,247; Referee: John McKendrick

31 December 2016 Championship	Dumbarton	1 – 0	Dundee United	Dumbarton Football Stadium
13:30	Docherty 27'	SPFL Report		Attendance: 1,221; Referee: Stephen Finnie; Man of the Match: Mark Docherty

6 January 2017 Championship	Hibernian	3 - 0	Dundee United	Easter Road
19:45	Cummings 6' 26'; Bartley (yellow card) 49'; McGinn 81'; Gray (yellow card) 85'	BBC Report	Telfer (yellow card) 30'; Murdoch (yellow card) 44' van der Velden (yellow card) 52'; Durnan (yellow card) 79'; Andreu (yellow card) 88'	Attendance: 18,786; Referee: (Scotland) Willie Collum

14 January 2017 Championship	Dundee United	3 – 3	Queen of the South	Tannadice Park
15:00	Murray 4' 89'; Murdoch (yellow card) 60'; Fraser 77'	BBC Report	Dobbie 28'; Thomson 53'; Thomas 65' (yellow card) 82'; Dowie (yellow card) 67'	Attendance: 6,136; Referee: (Scotland) Alan Muir

28 January 2017 Championship	Dunfermline Athletic	1 – 1	Dundee United	East End Park
15:00	Herron 28'	BBC Report	Andreu 18'	Attendance: 4,670; Referee: Dallas

4 February 2017 Championship	Dundee United	3 – 0	Raith Rovers	Tannadice Park
17:15	Mikkelsen 45', 53'; Andreu 48'	BBC Report		Attendance: 5,232; Referee: Finnie

11 February 2017 Championship	Falkirk	3 – 0	Dundee United	Falkirk Stadium
15:00	Baird 5'; Muirhead 53' (Penalty); Craigen 60'	BBC Report		Attendance: 5,028; Referee: Anderson

25 February 2017 Championship	Dundee United	1 – 1	Greenock Morton	Tannadice Park
15:00	Durnan 83'	BBC Report	Kidlay 39'	Attendance: 6,065; Referee: Clancy

10 March 2017 Championship	Dundee United	0 – 1	Hibernian	Tannadice Park
19:45	Toshney (yellow card) 31' (yellow-red card)	BBC Report	Cummings 39'; Cummings (yellow card) 75' (yellow-red card)	Attendance: 9,532; Referee: Robertson

15 March 2017 Championship	St Mirren	3 – 2	Dundee United	St Mirren Park
19:45	Davis 2'; Mallan 37'; Morgan 59'	BBC Report	Andreu 33', 69'	Attendance: 2,766; Referee: Aitken

18 March 2017 Championship	Raith Rovers	2 – 1	Dundee United	Stark's Park
15:00	Barr 41'; Hardie 49'	BBC Report	Murray 81'	Attendance: 2,192; Referee: Charleston

28 March 2017 Championship	Dundee United	2 – 1	Ayr United	Tannadice Park
	Murray 23'; Durnan 78'	BBC Report	Harkins 51' (Penalty)	Attendance: 4,661; Referee: Cook

1 April 2017 Championship	Queen of the South	4 – 2	Dundee United	Palmerston Park
15:00	Lyle 19'; Dobbie 43'; Dykes 81'; Hilson 89'	BBC Report	Mikkelsen 27', 55'	Attendance: 1,514; Referee: Finnie

8 April 2017 Championship	Dundee United	1 – 1	Falkirk	Tannadice Park
	Murray 50'	BBC Report	Leahy 83'	Attendance: 6,313; Referee: Anderson

11 Apr 2017 Championship	Dundee United	1 – 0	Dunfermline Athletic	Tannadice Park
19:45	Mikkelsen 30'	BBC report		Attendance: 5,304; Referee: Collum

15 April 2017 Championship	Ayr United	0 – 0	Dundee United	St Mirren Park
15:00		BBC Report		Attendance: 1,205; Referee: Allan; Irvine

22 April 2017 Championship	Dundee United	3 – 2	St Mirren	Tannadice Park
15:00	Mikkelsen 7'; Andreu 66'; Spittal 90'	BBC Report	MacKenzie 38'; Todd 86'	Attendance: 6,225; Referee: Charleston

29 April 2017 Championship	Dundee United	2 – 2	Dumbarton	Tannadice Park
15:00	Andreu 22'; Mikkelsen 79'	BBC Report	Thomson R 35'; Vaughan 65'	Attendance: 5,107; Referee: Walsh

6 May 2017 Championship	Greenock Morton	1 – 1	Dundee United	Greenock
15:00	Oyenuga 52'	BBC Report	Spittal 63'	Stadium: Cappielow Park; Attendance: 2,158; Referee: Beaton

=== Premiership play-offs ===
9 May 2017 Play-offs QF R1	Greenock Morton	1 – 2	Dundee United	Cappielow Park
19:45	O'Ware 7'	BBC Report	Murray 51'; Spittal 65'	Attendance: 3,306; Referee: Collum

12 May 2017 Play-offs QF R2	Dundee United	3 – 0 (5 – 1 agg.)	Greenock Morton	Tannadice Park
19:45	Murray 52'; Kuaté 64'; Spittal 81'	BBC Report		Attendance: 6,606; Referee: Andrew Dallas

16 May 2017 Play-offs SF R1	Dundee United	2 – 2	Falkirk	Tannadice Park
19:45	Murray 16'; Spittal 53'	BBC Report	Craigen 27'; McKee 59'	Attendance: 7,034; Referee: Madden

19 May 2017 Play-offs SF R2	Falkirk	1 – 2 (3 – 4 agg.)	Dundee United	Falkirk Stadium
19:45	Craigen 11'	BBC Report	Murray 76'; Dixon 87'	Attendance: 7,926; Referee: Clancy

25 May 2017 Play-offs Final R1	Dundee United	0 – 0	Hamilton Academical	Tannadice Park
19:45	Murray (yellow card) (yellow-red card) 77'	BBC Report		Attendance: 9,386; Referee: McLean

28 May 2017 Play-offs Final R2	Hamilton Academical	1 – 0 (1 – 0 agg.)	Dundee United	New Douglas Park
15:00	Docherty 64'	BBC Report		Attendance: 5,027; Referee: Thomson

=== Scottish League Cup ===
==== Group stage ====
15 July 2016 Group C	Arbroath	1 – 1 (3 – 5 p)	Dundee United	Tannadice Park
19:45	Hamilton 90+2'	SPFL Report	Anier 85'	Attendance: 5,036; Referee: McLean
	Penalties
	Doris (penalty scored); Whatley (penalty scored); Callaghan (penalty missed); Hamilton (penalty scored)		(penalty scored) Telfer; (penalty scored) Donaldson; (penalty scored) Dixon; (penalty scored) Souttar; (penalty scored) Fraser

19 July 2016 Group C	Dundee United	6 – 1	Cowdenbeath	Tannadice Park
19:45	Murray 4', 32', 72'; Toshney 9'; Smith 21'; Anier 88'	BBC Report	Turner 25'	Attendance: 3,360; Referee: Allan

23 July 2016 Group C	Inverness Caledonian Thistle	1 – 1 (1 – 4 p)	Dundee United	Caledonian Stadium
15:00	Boden 35'	SPFL Report	Murdoch 45'	Attendance: 1,839; Referee: Anderson
	Penalties
	Tremarco (penalty scored); Tansey (penalty missed); Draper (penalty missed)		(penalty scored) Obadeyi; (penalty scored) Donaldson; (penalty scored) Murdoch; (penalty scored) Murray

31 July 2016 Group C	Dundee United	2 – 0	Dunfermline Athletic	Tannadice Park
15:00	Murray 49'; Fraser 83'	SPFL Report		Attendance: 4,951; Referee: McKendrick

==== Knockout phase ====
9 August 2016 Second round	Dundee United	3 – 1	Partick Thistle	Dundee
19:45	C Smith 10', 27', 30' (pen.)	SPFL Report	Welsh 65'	Stadium: Tannadice Park; Attendance: 5,036; Referee: Steven McLean

20 September 2016 Quarter-finals	Morton	2 – 1	Dundee United	Greenock
19:45	Quitongo 24'; O'Ware 31'	SPFL Report	van der Velden 55'	Stadium: Cappielow; Attendance: 2,149; Referee: Andrew Dallas

=== Scottish Challenge Cup ===
3 September 2016 Third round	Dundee United	3 – 2 (a.e.t.)	Peterhead	Dundee
15:00	Telfer 1' van der Velden 34'; Andreu 116'	SPFL report	McAllister 28', 35'	Stadium: Tannadice Park; Attendance: 3,520; Referee: Nick Walsh

8 October 2016 Fourth round	Stranraer	0 – 1	Dundee United	Stranraer
14:00		SPFL Report	Andreu 68'	Stadium: Stair Park; Attendance: 629; Referee: Greg Aitken

12 November 2016 Quarter-finals	Dunfermline Athletic	0 – 1	Dundee United	Dunfermline
12:30	Martin (red card) 57'	SPFL report	Durnan 8'	Stadium: East End Park; Attendance: 2,576; Referee: Willie Collum

18 February 2017 Semi-finals	Queen of the South	2 – 3	Dundee United	Dumfries
17:15	Dobbie 51'; Lyle 91'		Telfer 3'; Fraser 11'; Andreu 35'	Stadium: Palmerston Park; Attendance: 1,526; Referee: Nick Walsh

25 March 2017 Final	St. Mirren	1 – 2	Dundee United	Motherwell
12:30	Loy 38'		Andreu 37'; Mikkelsen 75'	Stadium: Fir Park; Attendance: 8,089; Referee: Nick Walsh

=== Scottish Cup ===
21 January 2017 Scottish Cup Fourth round	Ross County	6 – 2	Dundee United	Global Energy Stadium
15:00	Routis 6', 76'; Quinn 16'; Chow 28'; Boyce 30'; O'Brien 90+2'	BBC Report	Andreu 13', 47'	Attendance: 2,440; Referee: Kevin Clancy

== Squad statistics ==
During the 2016–17 season, United used thirty different players in competitive games. The table below shows the number of appearances and goals scored by each player.

As of 28 May 2017 (UTC)

No.	Pos	Nat	Player	Total		Championship		Other^{[a]}		League Cup		Scottish Cup	
No.	Pos	Nat	Player	Apps	Goals	Apps	Goals	Apps	Goals	Apps	Goals	Apps	Goals
1	GK	(Scotland) SCO	Cammy Bell	49	0	35+0	0	7+0	0	6+0	0	1+0	0
2	DF	(Republic of Ireland) IRL	Seán Dillon	21	0	6+4	0	6+2	0	1+2	0	0+0	0
3	DF	(Scotland) SCO	Paul Dixon	28	1	17+0	0	6+1	1	4+0	0	0+0	0
4	DF	(Scotland) SCO	Mark Durnan	45	5	31+0	4	9+0	1	4+0	0	1+0	0
5	DF	(Scotland) SCO	Coll Donaldson	22	0	7+7	0	1+2	0	4+1	0	0+0	0
6	DF	(Scotland) SCO	Lewis Toshney	28	1	18+2	0	2+0	0	6+0	1	0+0	0
7	MF	(Scotland) SCO	Blair Spittal	40	5	18+6	2	9+0	3	4+2	0	0+1	0
8	MF	(Scotland) SCO	Stewart Murdoch	30	1	16+2	0	4+1	0	6+0	1	1+0	0
9	FW	(Scotland) SCO	Simon Murray	50	18	24+8	10	10+1	4	4+2	4	1+0	0
10	MF	(Scotland) SCO	Scott Fraser	37	6	23+2	4	3+3	1	5+0	1	1+0	0
11	MF	(England) ENG	Alex Nicholls	13	0	4+5	0	1+3	0	0+0	0	0+0	0
12	MF	(Scotland) SCO	Charlie Telfer	38	2	17+8	0	5+4	2	1+2	0	1+0	0
14	DF	(France) FRA	William Edjenguélé	41	2	29+0	2	10+0	0	1+0	0	1+0	0
15	FW	(Scotland) SCO	Cammy Smith	22	5	5+10	1	2+0	0	4+1	4	0+0	0
16	MF	(Republic of Ireland) IRL	Willo Flood	46	2	32+0	2	9+0	0	4+0	0	0+1	0
17	MF	(Portugal) POR	Wato Kuaté	8	1	2+1	0	5+0	1	0+0	0	0+0	0
18	FW	(Denmark) DEN	Thomas Mikkelsen	26	8	14+3	7	6+2	1	0+0	0	0+1	0
19	MF	(France) FRA	Tony Andreu	42	19	31+0	13	10+0	4	0+0	0	1+0	2
20	DF	(Netherlands) NED	Frank van der Struijk	20	0	16+0	0	2+0	0	1+0	0	1+0	0
21	GK	(Germany) GER	Luis Zwick	8	0	1+3	0	4+0	0	0+0	0	0+0	0
22	MF	(Scotland) SCO	Ali Coote	16	0	2+7	0	1+5	0	0+1	0	0+0	0
23	MF	(Netherlands) NED	Nick van der Velden	31	3	14+10	1	3+0	1	2+2	1	0+0	0
24	DF	(Scotland) SCO	Jamie Robson	29	1	19+2	1	5+0	0	2+0	0	1+0	0
27	MF	(Scotland) SCO	Brad Smith	1	0	0+0	0	1+0	0	0+0	0	0+0	0
35	MF	(Scotland) SCO	Scott Allardice	7	0	4+2	0	0+1	0	0+0	0	0+0	0
37	MF	(Scotland) SCO	Graham Taylor	1	0	0+0	0	0+1	0	0+0	0	0+0	0
Players who left the club during the 2016–17 season
11	MF	(England) ENG	Tope Obadeyi	25	2	11+7	2	0+0	0	5+1	0	1+0	0
17	FW	(Netherlands) NED	Justin Johnson	2	0	0+1	0	0+0	0	0+1	0	0+0	0
20	FW	(Estonia) EST	Henri Anier	5	2	0+1	0	0+0	0	0+4	2	0+0	0
32	DF	(Australia) AUS	Harry Souttar	1	0	0+0	0	0+0	0	1+0	0	0+0	0

a. Includes other competitive competitions, including the play-offs and the Challenge Cup.

== Team statistics ==
=== League table ===
Pos	Team	Pld	W	D	L	GF	GA	GD	Pts	Promotion, qualification or relegation
1	Hibernian (C, P)	36	19	14	3	59	25	+34	71	Promotion to Premiership
2	Falkirk	36	16	12	8	58	40	+18	60	Qualification for the Premiership play-off semi-finals
3	Dundee United	36	15	12	9	50	42	+8	57	Qualification for the Premiership play-off quarter-finals
4	Greenock Morton	36	13	13	10	44	41	+3	52	Qualification for the Premiership play-off quarter-finals
5	Dunfermline Athletic	36	12	12	12	46	43	+3	48	

Source: Soccerway
Rules for classification: 1) Points; 2) Goal difference; 3) Number of goals scored
(C) Champions; (P) Promoted

=== League Cup tables ===
Group C
Pos	Team	Pld	W	PW	PL	L	GF	GA	GD	Pts	Qualification	ICT	DUN	DNF	COW	ARB
1	Inverness CT (Q)	4	3	0	1	0	15	3	+12	10	Qualification for the Second Round	—	1–1p	—	—	7–0
2	Dundee United (Q)	4	2	2	0	0	10	3	+7	10	Qualification for the Second Round	—	—	2–0	6–1	—
3	Dunfermline Athletic	4	2	0	0	2	7	7	0	6		1–5	—	—	—	3–0
4	Cowdenbeath	4	1	0	0	3	4	11	−7	3		1–2	—	0–3	—	—
5	Arbroath	4	0	0	1	3	1	13	−12	1		—	1–1p	—	0–2	—

Source: SPFL
(Q) Qualified to the phase indicated

Best runners-up
Pos	Team	Pld	W	D	L	GF	GA	GD	Pts	Qualification
1	Dundee United (Q)	4	2	2	0	10	3	+7	10	Qualification to the Second Round
2	Motherwell (Q)	4	3	0	1	9	3	+6	9	Qualification to the Second Round
3	Queen of the South (Q)	4	3	0	1	6	2	+4	9	Qualification to the Second Round
4	Ayr United (Q)	4	3	0	1	5	2	+3	9	Qualification to the Second Round
5	Raith Rovers	4	2	1	1	5	4	+1	8	
6	East Fife	4	2	1	1	5	4	+1	8	
7	Kilmarnock	4	2	1	1	5	5	0	7	
8	Falkirk	4	2	0	2	5	4	+1	6	

Updated to match(es) played on 30 July 2016. Source: BBC
Rules for classification: 1) Points, 2) goal difference, 3) goals scored, 4) away goals scored, 5) matches won, 6) away matches won, 7) drawing of lots
(Q) Qualified for the phase indicated

=== Management statistics ===
Last updated on 28 May 2017

Name	From	To	P	W	D	L	Win% (Note: Win% is the percentage of matches won rounded to two decimal places.)
Ray McKinnon	14 July 2016	Present	54	26	16	12	48.15

== Transfers ==
=== Players in ===
Player	From	Fee
(Scotland) Stewart Murdoch	(Scotland) Ross County	Free
(Scotland) Cammy Bell	(Scotland) Rangers	Free
(Northern Ireland) Brett Long	(Scotland) Motherwell	Free
(Scotland) Lewis Toshney	(Scotland) Raith Rovers	Undisclosed
(England) Tope Obadeyi	(Scotland) Kilmarnock	Free
(Republic of Ireland) Willo Flood	(Scotland) Aberdeen	Free
(Netherlands) Nick van der Velden	(Netherlands) Willem II	Free
(France) William Edjenguélé	(Greece) Veria	Free
(Netherlands) Frank van der Struijk	(Netherlands) Willem II	Free
(Portugal) Wato Kuaté	Free Agent	Free

=== Players out ===
Player	To	Fee
(Austria) Darko Bodul	(Russia) Amkar Perm	Free
(Scotland) Ryan Dow	(Scotland) Ross County	Free
(Republic of Ireland) Callum Morris	(Scotland) Aberdeen	Free
(France) Florent Sinama Pongolle	(Thailand) Chainat Hornbill	Free
(Scotland) Greig McNaughton	(Scotland) St Mirren	Free
(Japan) Eiji Kawashima	(France) Metz	Free
(Nigeria) Edward Ofere	(Sweden) FC Rosengård	Free
(Ivory Coast) Guy Demel	(France) Marseille Consolat	Free
(Scotland) John Rankin	(Scotland) Falkirk	Free
(Scotland) Euan Spark	(Scotland) Dunfermline Athletic	Free
(Northern Ireland) Joe McGovern	(Scotland) Forfar Athletic	Free
(Republic of Ireland) Gavin Gunning	(Scotland) Greenock Morton	Free
(Northern Ireland) Paul Paton	(Scotland) St Johnstone	Free
(Poland) Michał Szromnik	(Poland) Bytovia Bytów	Free
(Estonia) Henri Anier	(Sweden) Kalmar FF	Free
(Scotland) Kieran Freeman	(England) Southampton	Undisclosed
(Australia) Harry Souttar	(England) Stoke City	Undisclosed
(Scotland) Ryan Booth	(Scotland) Inverurie Loco Works	Free
(Netherlands) Justin Johnson	Unattached	Free
(England) Tope Obadeyi	(England) Oldham Athletic	Free
(Netherlands) Nick van der Velden	(Indonesia) Bali United	Free

=== Loans in ===
Player	From	Fee
(Scotland) Cammy Smith	(Scotland) Aberdeen	Loan
(France) Tony Andreu	(England) Norwich City	Loan
(Denmark) Thomas Mikkelsen	(Denmark) OB	Loan
(England) Alex Nicholls	(England) Barnet	Loan

=== Loans out ===
Player	To	Fee
(England) Jassem Sukar	(Scotland) Arbroath	Loan
(Northern Ireland) Brett Long	(Scotland) Forfar Athletic	Loan
(Scotland) Cammy Ballantyne	(Scotland) Montrose	Loan
(Scotland) Ryan Booth	(Scotland) Inverurie Loco Works	Loan
(Netherlands) Justin Johnson	(England) York City	Loan
(Scotland) Matty Smith	(Scotland) Montrose	Loan
(England) Jassem Sukar	(Scotland) Arbroath	Loan
(Scotland) Aaron Murrell	(Scotland) Berwick Rangers	Loan
(Scotland) Brad Smith	(Scotland) Albion Rovers	Loan

== See also ==
- List of Dundee United F.C. seasons
