= 2016–17 Scottish League Cup =

Tournament details
- Country: Scotland
- Dates: 15 July 2016 – 27 November 2016
- Teams: 44

Final positions
- Champions: Celtic
- Runners-up: Aberdeen

Tournament statistics
- Matches played: 95
- Goals scored: 291 (3.06 per match)
- Top goal scorer(s): Martyn Waghorn (7 goals)

The 2016–17 Scottish League Cup (also known as the Betfred Cup for sponsorship reasons) was the 71st season of Scotland's second-most prestigious football knockout competition.

The format for the 2016–17 competition changed from the previously used knockout-rounds. Instead, it began with eight groups of five teams which included all 2015–16 Scottish Professional Football League (SPFL) clubs, excluding those competing in Champions League and Europa League qualifiers, as well as the winners of the 2015–16 Highland Football League (Cove Rangers) and the 2015–16 Lowland Football League (Edinburgh City).

Celtic won the final 3–0 against Aberdeen on 27 November 2016.

== Schedule ==
Round	First match date	Fixtures	Clubs
Group stage	16 July 2016	80	44 → 16
Second round	9 August 2016	8	16 → 8
Quarter finals	20 September 2016	4	8 → 4
Semifinals	22 October 2016	2	4 → 2
Final	27 November 2016	1	2 → 1

== Format ==
The competition began with eight groups of five teams. The four clubs competing in the UEFA Champions League (Celtic) and Europa League (Aberdeen, Heart of Midlothian and Hibernian) qualifying rounds were given a bye through to the second round. The 40 teams competing in the group stage consisted of the other nine teams that competed in the 2015–16 Scottish Premiership, nine from the 2015–16 Scottish Championship and all of the teams that competed in the 2015–16 Scottish League One and 2015–16 Scottish League Two, as well as the 2015–16 Highland Football League and the 2015–16 Lowland Football League champions.

The winners of each of the 8 groups, as well as the 4 best runners-up have progressed to the second round (last 16), which will include the four UEFA qualifying clubs. At this stage, the competition reverts to the traditional knock-out format. The four group winners with the highest points total and the clubs entering at this stage were seeded, with the four group winners with the lowest points unseeded along with the four best runners-up.

=== Bonus point system ===
In December 2015, the SPFL announced that alongside the new group stage format, a bonus point system would be introduced to provide greater excitement and increase the number of meaningful games at this stage. The traditional point system of awarding 3 points for a win and 1 point for a draw was used, however, for each group stage match that finished in a draw, a penalty shoot-out took place, with the winner being awarded a bonus point.

== Group stage ==
The group stage was made up of nine teams from the 2015–16 Scottish Premiership, nine teams from the 2015–16 Scottish Championship and 10 teams from each of the 2015–16 Scottish League One and 2015–16 Scottish League Two, as well as the winners of the 2015–16 Highland Football League and 2015–16 Lowland Football League. The 40 teams were divided into two sections: North and South; with each section containing four top seeded teams, four second seeded teams and 12 unseeded teams. Each section was drawn into four groups with each group being made up of 1 top seed, 1 second seed and 3 unseeded sides.

The draw for the group stages took place on Friday 27 May 2016 at 7:30pm BST at the BT Sport Studio in London and was shown live on BT Sport Europe.

=== North ===
==== Group A ====
Pos	Team	Pld	W	PW	PL	L	GF	GA	GD	Pts	Qualification	PET	EFI	DND	FOR	DUM
1	Peterhead (Q)	4	2	1	0	1	8	6	+2	8	Qualification for the Second Round	—	—	2–1	2–0	—
2	East Fife	4	2	1	0	1	5	4	+1	8		2–1	—	p1–1	—	—
3	Dundee	4	2	0	1	1	15	5	+10	7		—	—	—	7–0	6–2
4	Forfar Athletic	4	1	1	0	2	4	11	−7	5		—	2–0	—	—	p2–2
5	Dumbarton	4	0	0	2	2	7	13	−6	2		3–3p	0–2	—	—	—

Source: SPFL
(Q) Qualified to the phase indicated

==== Group B ====
Pos	Team	Pld	W	PW	PL	L	GF	GA	GD	Pts	Qualification	STJ	FAL	STI	BRE	ELG
1	St Johnstone (Q)	4	3	0	1	0	11	2	+9	10	Qualification for the Second Round	—	3–0	4–0	—	—
2	Falkirk	4	2	0	0	2	5	4	+1	6		—	—	—	2–0	3–0
3	Stirling Albion	4	2	0	0	2	6	7	−1	6		—	1–0	—	—	4–1
4	Brechin City	4	1	1	0	2	5	8	−3	5		p1–1	—	2–1	—	—
5	Elgin City	4	1	0	0	3	6	12	−6	3		1–3	—	—	4–2	—

Source: SPFL
(Q) Qualified to the phase indicated

==== Group C ====
Pos	Team	Pld	W	PW	PL	L	GF	GA	GD	Pts	Qualification	ICT	DUN	DNF	COW	ARB
1	Inverness CT (Q)	4	3	0	1	0	15	3	+12	10	Qualification for the Second Round	—	1–1p	—	—	7–0
2	Dundee United (Q)	4	2	2	0	0	10	3	+7	10	Qualification for the Second Round	—	—	2–0	6–1	—
3	Dunfermline Athletic	4	2	0	0	2	7	7	0	6		1–5	—	—	—	3–0
4	Cowdenbeath	4	1	0	0	3	4	11	−7	3		1–2	—	0–3	—	—
5	Arbroath	4	0	0	1	3	1	13	−12	1		—	1–1p	—	0–2	—

Source: SPFL
(Q) Qualified to the phase indicated

==== Group D ====
Pos	Team	Pld	W	PW	PL	L	GF	GA	GD	Pts	Qualification	ALL	RAI	ROS	COV	MON
1	Alloa Athletic (Q)	4	4	0	0	0	10	2	+8	12	Qualification for the Second Round	—	—	3–2	4–0	—
2	Raith Rovers	4	2	1	0	1	5	4	+1	8		0–1	—	—	—	2–1
3	Ross County	4	2	0	1	1	11	4	+7	7		—	1–1p	—	7–0	—
4	Cove Rangers	4	1	0	0	3	4	13	−9	3		—	1–2	—	—	3–0
5	Montrose	4	0	0	0	4	1	8	−7	0		0–2	—	0–1	—	—

Source: SPFL
(Q) Qualified to the phase indicated

=== South ===
==== Group E ====
Pos	Team	Pld	W	PW	PL	L	GF	GA	GD	Pts	Qualification	PAR	QOS	AIR	QPA	STE
1	Partick Thistle (Q)	4	4	0	0	0	9	2	+7	12	Qualification for the Second Round	—	2–1	—	2–0	—
2	Queen of the South (Q)	4	3	0	0	1	6	2	+4	9	Qualification for the Second Round	—	—	2–0	—	1–0
3	Airdrieonians	4	1	1	0	2	5	7	−2	5		0–1	—	—	—	2–1
4	Queen's Park	4	1	0	1	2	5	7	−2	4		—	0–2	p3–3	—	—
5	Stenhousemuir	4	0	0	0	4	2	9	−7	0		1–4	—	—	0–2	—

Source: SPFL
(Q) Qualified to the phase indicated

==== Group F ====
Pos	Team	Pld	W	PW	PL	L	GF	GA	GD	Pts	Qualification	RAN	MOT	STR	ANN	EST
1	Rangers (Q)	4	4	0	0	0	10	0	+10	12	Qualification for the Second Round	—	—	3–0	2–0	—
2	Motherwell (Q)	4	3	0	0	1	9	3	+6	9	Qualification for the Second Round	0–2	—	—	—	3–0
3	Stranraer	4	2	0	0	2	5	8	−3	6		—	0–3	—	—	3–1
4	Annan Athletic	4	1	0	0	3	4	7	−3	3		—	1–3	1–2	—	—
5	East Stirlingshire	4	0	0	0	4	1	11	−10	0		0–3	—	—	0–2	—

Source: SPFL
(Q) Qualified to the phase indicated

==== Group G ====
Pos	Team	Pld	W	PW	PL	L	GF	GA	GD	Pts	Qualification	HAM	AYR	STM	LIV	EDI
1	Hamilton Academical (Q)	4	3	0	0	1	10	5	+5	9	Qualification for the Second Round	—	—	3–0	2–1	—
2	Ayr United (Q)	4	3	0	0	1	5	2	+3	9	Qualification for the Second Round	2–1	—	—	—	1–0
3	St Mirren	4	3	0	0	1	7	5	+2	9		—	1–0	—	—	3–0
4	Livingston	4	1	0	0	3	6	7	−1	3		—	0–2	2–3	—	—
5	Edinburgh City	4	0	0	0	4	2	11	−9	0		2–4	—	—	0–3	—

Source: SPFL
(Q) Qualified to the phase indicated

==== Group H ====
Pos	Team	Pld	W	PW	PL	L	GF	GA	GD	Pts	Qualification	GMO	KIL	CLY	ALB	BER
1	Morton (Q)	4	3	1	0	0	5	0	+5	11	Qualification for the Second Round	—	—	1–0	—	2–0
2	Kilmarnock	4	2	0	1	1	5	5	0	7		0–2	—	—	0–0p	—
3	Clyde	4	1	1	0	2	4	5	−1	5		—	1–2	—	—	p1–1
4	Albion Rovers	4	0	2	1	1	1	2	−1	5		0–0p	—	1–2	—	—
5	Berwick Rangers	4	0	0	2	2	3	6	−3	2		—	2–3	—	0–0p	—

Source: SPFL
(Q) Qualified to the phase indicated

=== Best runners-up ===
Pos	Team	Pld	W	D	L	GF	GA	GD	Pts	Qualification
1	Dundee United (Q)	4	2	2	0	10	3	+7	10	Qualification to the Second Round
2	Motherwell (Q)	4	3	0	1	9	3	+6	9	Qualification to the Second Round
3	Queen of the South (Q)	4	3	0	1	6	2	+4	9	Qualification to the Second Round
4	Ayr United (Q)	4	3	0	1	5	2	+3	9	Qualification to the Second Round
5	Raith Rovers	4	2	1	1	5	4	+1	8	
6	East Fife	4	2	1	1	5	4	+1	8	
7	Kilmarnock	4	2	1	1	5	5	0	7	
8	Falkirk	4	2	0	2	5	4	+1	6	

Updated to match(es) played on 30 July 2016. Source: BBC
Rules for classification: 1) Points, 2) goal difference, 3) goals scored, 4) away goals scored, 5) matches won, 6) away matches won, 7) drawing of lots
(Q) Qualified for the phase indicated

== Knockout phase ==
=== Second round ===
==== Draw and seeding ====
The following teams qualified and will compete in the second round of the 2016–17 Scottish League Cup. Aberdeen, Celtic, Heart of Midlothian and Hibernian entered the competition at this stage, after receiving a bye for the group stage due to their participation in UEFA club competitions.

The draw for the second round took place at Tannadice Park following the conclusion of the Dundee United–Dunfermline Athletic match on 31 July, and was shown live on BT Sport. The four UEFA-qualifying clubs and the four group winners with the best record were seeded for the draw.

Teams in Bold advanced to the quarter-finals.

Seeded	Unseeded
**Aberdeen**; **Alloa Athletic***; **Celtic**; Heart of Midlothian; Hibernian†; **Morton**†; Partick Thistle; **Rangers**	Ayr United†; **Dundee United**†; Hamilton Academical; Inverness CT; Motherwell; Peterhead*; **Queen of the South**†; **St Johnstone**

Notes

- † denotes teams playing in the Championship.
- * denotes team playing in League One.

==== Matches ====
All times are BST (UTC+1).

9 August 2016	**Alloa Athletic**	**1–0**	Inverness CT	Alloa
19:30	Marr 28'	SPFL Report		Stadium: Recreation Park; Attendance: 613; Referee: Don Robertson

9 August 2016	**Rangers**	**5–0**	Peterhead	Glasgow
19:45	Kranjčar 19'; Hill 35', 56'; Kelleher 48' (o.g.); Dodoo 65'	SPFL Report	Blockley (red card) 55'	Stadium: Ibrox Stadium; Attendance: 27,076; Referee: Andrew Dallas

9 August 2016	**Dundee United**	**3–1**	Partick Thistle	Dundee
19:45	C Smith 10', 27', 30' (pen.)	SPFL Report	Welsh 65'	Stadium: Tannadice Park; Attendance: 5,036; Referee: Steven McLean

9 August 2016	Hamilton Academical	**1–2**	**Morton**	Hamilton
19:45	Imrie 8' (pen.)	SPFL Report	Forbes 59'; Quitongo 63'	Stadium: New Douglas Park; Referee: Stephen Finnie

9 August 2016	Hibernian	**1–3**	**Queen of the South**	Edinburgh
19:45	Hanlon 22'	SPFL Report	Dobbie 66'; Anderson 82'; Dykes 86'	Stadium: Easter Road; Attendance: 7,646; Referee: Euan Anderson

10 August 2016	**Celtic**	**5–0**	Motherwell	Glasgow
19:45	Rogic 20', 76'; Dembélé 34' (pen.), 64'; Sinclair 61'	SPFL Report		Stadium: Celtic Park; Attendance: 20,165; Referee: Kevin Clancy

10 August 2016	**St Johnstone**	**3–2**	Heart of Midlothian	Perth
19:45	Swanson 10', 75' (pen.); McKay 80'	SPFL Report	Paterson 43'; Walker 45+2' (pen.)	Stadium: McDiarmid Park; Attendance: 4,214; Referee: Crawford Allan

10 August 2016	Ayr United	**1–2**	**Aberdeen**	Ayr
19:45	Forrest 41'	SPFL Report	Meggatt 3' (o.g.); McGinn 30'	Stadium: Somerset Park; Attendance: 2,653; Referee: Alan Muir

=== Quarter-finals ===
==== Draw and seeding ====
The quarter-final draw took place at Celtic Park following the conclusion of the Celtic–Motherwell match on 10 August, and was shown live on BT Sport. The draw was unseeded and ties scheduled for the midweek of 20/21 September.

Teams in Bold advanced to the semi-finals.

Premiership	Championship	League One
**Aberdeen**; **Celtic**; **Rangers**; St Johnstone	Dundee United; **Morton**; Queen of the South	Alloa Athletic

==== Matches ====
20 September 2016	**Morton**	**2–1**	Dundee United	Greenock
19:45	Quitongo 24'; O'Ware 31'	SPFL Report	van der Velden 55'	Stadium: Cappielow; Attendance: 2,149; Referee: Andrew Dallas

20 September 2016	**Rangers**	**5–0**	Queen of the South	Glasgow
19:45	Holt 33'; Halliday 62'; Waghorn 63', 71', 83'	SPFL Report		Stadium: Ibrox Stadium; Attendance: 26,079; Referee: Don Robertson

21 September 2016	**Celtic**	**2–0**	Alloa Athletic	Glasgow
19:45	Forrest 83'; Dembélé 90'	SPFL Report		Stadium: Celtic Park; Attendance: 15,900; Referee: Alan Muir

22 September 2016	**Aberdeen**	**1–0**	St Johnstone	Aberdeen
19:45	Rooney 90'	SPFL Report		Stadium: Pittodrie Stadium; Attendance: 8,829; Referee: Craig Thomson

=== Semi-finals ===
==== Draw and seeding ====
The semi-final draw took place at Pittodrie Stadium following the conclusion of the Aberdeen–St Johnstone match on 22 September and was shown live on BT Sport. The draw was unseeded and ties are scheduled for the weekend of 22 October.

Teams in Bold advanced to the final.

Premiership	Championship
**Aberdeen**; **Celtic**; Rangers	Morton

==== Matches ====
22 October 2016	Morton	**0–2**	**Aberdeen**	Glasgow
12:15		SPFL Report	Rooney 69'; McLean 88'	Stadium: Hampden Park; Attendance: 16,183; Referee: Kevin Clancy

23 October 2016	Rangers	**0–1**	**Celtic**	Glasgow
14:15		BBC Report	Dembélé 87'	Stadium: Hampden Park; Attendance: 50,697; Referee: Craig Thomson

== Final ==
27 November 2016
15:00

Aberdeen	0–3	Celtic
	SPFL Report	Rogic 16'; Forrest 37'; Dembélé 64' (pen.)

Hampden Park, Glasgow
Attendance: 49,629
Referee: John Beaton

== Top goalscorers ==
As of matches played on 23 October 2016

Rank	Player	Club	Goals
1	(England) Martyn Waghorn	Rangers	7
2	(Scotland) Brian Graham	Ross County	6
2	(Scotland) Greg Stewart	Dundee	6
4	(France) Moussa Dembélé	Celtic	5
4	(Scotland) Danny Swanson	St Johnstone	5
6	(England) Scott Boden	Inverness CT	4
6	(Scotland) Andy Geggan	Dunfermline Athletic	4
6	(Scotland) Blair Henderson	Stirling Albion	4
6	(Scotland) Rory McAllister	Peterhead	4
6	(Scotland) Simon Murray	Dundee United	4
6	(Scotland) Jai Quitongo	Morton	4
6	(Scotland) Cammy Smith	Dundee United	4
6	(Scotland) Iain Vigurs	Inverness CT	4
