= 2016–17 Scottish Challenge Cup =

Tournament details
- Country: Scotland
- Teams: 54

Final positions
- Champions: Dundee United
- Runners-up: St Mirren

Tournament statistics
- Matches played: 53
- Goals scored: 207 (3.91 per match)
- Top goal scorer: Stephen Dobbie (6 goals)

The 2016–17 Scottish Challenge Cup, known as the IRN-BRU Cup due to sponsorship reasons, was the 26th season of the competition. The tournament took on a different format from previous seasons with a total of 54 teams participating. It was the first season with two clubs from both Northern Ireland and Wales competing alongside the 30 members of the 2016–17 Scottish Championship, 2016–17 Scottish League One and 2016–17 Scottish League Two, four teams from the 2016–17 Highland Football League and four from the 2016–17 Lowland Football League as well as the Under-20 teams of the teams competing in the 2016–17 Scottish Premiership.

The defending champions, Rangers, who defeated Peterhead in the 2016 final, did not compete in the competition due to their promotion to the Scottish Premiership. Irn Bru replaced Petrofac as the main sponsor of the competition in June 2016.

== Format ==
Round	Date	Fixtures	Clubs	New Entries
First round	2–3 August 2016	14	54 → 40	12 Under-20 teams from 2016–17 Scottish Premiership; 8 teams placed 3rd–10th from 2015–16 Scottish League Two; 4 teams from 2015–16 Lowland Football League; 4 teams from 2015–16 Highland Football League
Second round	16–17 August 2016	12	40 → 28	2 teams placed 1st and 2nd from 2015–16 Scottish League Two; 8 teams placed 3rd–10th from 2015–16 Scottish League One
Third round	3–4 September 2016	12	28 → 16	2 teams placed 1st and 2nd from 2015–16 Scottish League One; 9 teams from 2015–16 Scottish Championship plus Dundee United
Fourth round	8–9 October 2016	8	16 → 8	2 teams from 2015–16 NIFL Premiership; 2 teams from 2015–16 Welsh Premier League; Note: Fourth round draw was regionalised to keep Northern Irish and Welsh teams apart.
Quarter-finals	12–13 November 2016	4	8 → 4	
Semi-finals	18–19 February 2017	2	4 → 2	
Final	25 or 26 March 2017	1	2 → 1	

== First round ==
The draw for the first round was made on 23 June at Hampden Park. The 28 teams entering at this stage were separated into 4 regional pools. This was to ensure that U20s teams were not drawn against each other and that teams from the Highland and Lowland Leagues were not drawn against each other.

=== North Section ===
==== Draw and seeding ====
Teams from Pool A will be drawn against teams from Pool B. Teams in Bold qualified for the Second round.

Pool A	Pool B
**Aberdeen U20s**; Dundee U20s; **Heart of Midlothian U20s**; Inverness Caledonian Thistle U20s; Ross County U20s; St Johnstone U20s; East Stirlingshire	**Cove Rangers**; Formartine United; **Brora Rangers**; **Turriff United**; Stirling Albion; **Montrose**; **Arbroath**

==== Matches ====
2 August 2016	Ross County U20s	**2–3** (a.e.t.)	**Brora Rangers**	Dingwall
19:30	G. Morrison 52'; Wallace 76'	SPFL report	Pollock 33'; Mackay 80'; Campbell 103'	Stadium: Victoria Park; Attendance: 350; Referee: Ben Dempster

2 August 2016	Inverness Caledonian Thistle U20s	**0–3**	**Arbroath**	Inverness
19:45		SPFL report	Kader 17'; Hamilton 21'; Scott 77'	Stadium: Caledonian Stadium; Attendance: 296; Referee: Alex Shepherd

2 August 2016	East Stirlingshire	**0–3**	**Montrose**	Stenhousemuir
19:45		SPFL report	Masson 29'; Webster 61'; Ferguson 83'	Stadium: Ochilview Park; Attendance: 149; Referee: Craig Naiper

2 August 2016	Stirling Albion	**2–3**	**Heart of Midlothian U20s**	Stirling
19:45	McKenzie 4', 34'	SPFL report	Jones 46'; Roy 50'; McLean 67'	Stadium: Forthbank Stadium; Attendance: 476; Referee: Steven Reid

2 August 2016	St Johnstone U20s	**1–2**	**Turriff United**	Perth
19:45	G. Hurst 19'	SPFL report	MacKenzie 51' (o.g.); Booth 86'	Stadium: McDiarmid Park; Attendance: 320; Referee: Chris Fordyce

2 August 2016	Formartine United	**2–5**	**Aberdeen U20s**	Pitmedden
19:45	Gauld 81'; Rodger 83'	SPFL report	Wright 27', 53', 65'; Norris 50'; Nuttall 66'	Stadium: North Lodge Park; Attendance: 305; Referee: Graham Beaton

2 August 2016	**Cove Rangers**	**2–1**	Dundee U20s	Forfar
19:45	Buchan 78'; Scully 84'	SPFL Report	Warwick 29'	Stadium: Station Park, Forfar; Attendance: 190; Referee: Mike Roncone

=== South Section ===
==== Draw and seeding ====
Teams from Pool C will be drawn against teams from Pool D. Teams in Bold qualified for the Second round.

Pool C	Pool D
**Celtic U20s**; **Hamilton Academical U20s**; Kilmarnock U20s; **Motherwell U20s**; **Partick Thistle U20s**; **Rangers U20s**; Berwick Rangers	Edinburgh City; **Spartans**; Stirling University; Cumbernauld Colts; Clyde; **Queen's Park**; Annan Athletic

==== Matches ====
2 August 2016	Clyde	**0–5**	**Partick Thistle U20s**	Cumbernauld
19:30		SPFL report	Nisbet 52', 67', 76'; Penrice 64'; McLaughlin 80'	Stadium: Broadwood Stadium; Attendance: 351; Referee: David Lowe

2 August 2016	**Celtic U20s**	**5–1**	Annan Athletic	Greenock
19:45	Nesbitt 21', 71'; Hendry 25'; Aitchison 40'; Crossan 82'	SPFL report	Omar 1'	Stadium: Cappielow; Attendance: 216; Referee: David Dickinson

2 August 2016	Berwick Rangers	**0–3**	**Spartans**	Berwick-upon-Tweed
19:45		SPFL Report	Maxwell 11'; Dishington 45+1'; Stevenson 50'	Stadium: Shielfield Park; Attendance: 302; Referee: Duncan Smith

2 August 2016	**Motherwell U20s**	**2–1**	Edinburgh City	Motherwell
19:45	Mackin 37'; Fry 60'	SPFL report	Cummings 73'	Stadium: Fir Park; Attendance: 402; Referee: Lloyd Wilson

2 August 2016	**Queen's Park**	**5–2**	Kilmarnock U20s	Glasgow
19:45	Brown 2'; Wharton 15'; McGeever 39'; Galt 60'; MacPherson 86' (pen.)	SPFL report	Hawkshaw 1'; Queen 45'	Stadium: Hampden Park; Attendance: 299; Referee: Greg Aitken

3 August 2016	Cumbernauld Colts	**0–3**	**Hamilton Academical U20s**	Cumbernauld
20:00		SPFL report	Cunningham 17'; Boyd 45'; Tierney 84'	Stadium: Broadwood Stadium; Attendance: 119; Referee: Chris Graham

10 August 2016	**Rangers U20s**	**4–0**	Stirling University	Stirling
19:30	Jeffries 6', 26'; Hardie 18'; Burt 28'	SPFL report		Stadium: Forthbank Stadium; Attendance: 493; Referee: Stewart Luke

== Second round ==
The draw for the second round was made at 12:30pm on Thursday, 4 August at Hampden Park and streamed live on Periscope by Irn-Bru's football Twitter account. The 14 teams advancing from the first round were joined by the top two teams from the 2015–16 Scottish League Two and the eight teams placed third to 10th from the 2015–16 Scottish League One.

The second round ties will take place on Tuesday 16 or Wednesday 17 August 2016.

=== North Section ===
==== Draw and seeding ====
Teams from Pot A will be drawn against teams from Pot B. Teams in Bold advanced to the third round.

Pot A	Pot B
01. **Peterhead**; 02. **Brechin City**; 03. **Forfar Athletic**; 04. **East Fife**; 05. **Elgin City**; 06. Montrose	07. Aberdeen U20s; 08. Heart of Midlothian U20s; 09. Cove Rangers; 10. Brora Rangers; 11. **Turriff United**; 12. Arbroath

==== Matches ====
16 August 2016	Aberdeen U20s	**1–3**	**Forfar Athletic**	Pitmedden
19:45	Omolokun 89'	SPFL report	Peters 33', 90+3'; Smith 54'	Stadium: North Lodge Park; Attendance: 221; Referee: Mike Roncone

16 August 2016	**Brechin City**	**4–1**	Cove Rangers	Brechin
19:45	Graham 16'; Jackson 36', 90+1'; Caldwell 60'	SPFL report	Milne 2'	Stadium: Glebe Park; Attendance: 242; Referee: Gavin Ross

16 August 2016	**Elgin City**	**2–0**	Heart of Midlothian U20s	Elgin
19:45	Sutherland 34'; MacLeod 56'	SPFL report		Stadium: Borough Briggs; Attendance: 350; Referee: Graham Beaton

16 August 2016	**Peterhead**	**3–2**	Brora Rangers	Peterhead
19:45	Brown 74'; McAllister 77'; McIntosh 80'	SPFL report	Sutherland 18'; Brindle 48'	Stadium: Balmoor Stadium; Attendance: 399; Referee: Mat Northcroft

17 August 2016	**Turriff United**	**1–0**	Montrose	Turriff
19:45	Kieczkowski 59'	SPFL report		Stadium: The Haughs; Attendance: 180; Referee: Liam Duncan

17 August 2016	Arbroath	**2–3** (a.e.t.)	**East Fife**	Arbroath
19:45	Little 34'; Hester 83'	SPFL report	Page 62'; K Smith 87'; McManus 113'	Stadium: Gayfield Park; Attendance: 335; Referee: Gavin Duncan

=== South Section ===
==== Draw and seeding ====
Teams from Pot C will be drawn against teams from Pot D. Teams in Italics were not known at the time of the draw. Teams in Bold advanced to the third round.

Pot C	Pot D
13. **Stranraer**; 14. **Airdrieonians**; 15. **Albion Rovers**; 16. **Stenhousemuir**; 17. Cowdenbeath; 18. **Queen's Park**	19. **Celtic U20s**; 20. Hamilton Academical U20s; 21. Motherwell U20s; 22. Partick Thistle U20s; 23. Rangers U20s; 24. Spartans

==== Matches ====
16 August 2016	Partick Thistle U20s	**1–1** (a.e.t.) (**5–6** p)	**Queen's Park**	Glasgow
19:30	McMullin 48'	SPFL report	Carter 88'	Stadium: Firhill Stadium; Attendance: 436; Referee: David Munro
	**Penalties**
	McCarthy (penalty scored); Higgins (penalty scored); Penrice (penalty scored); Docherty (penalty missed); McMullin (penalty scored); Wilson (penalty scored); McCarthy (penalty missed)		(penalty scored) Miller; (penalty scored) Cummins; (penalty scored) Watt; (penalty missed) Wharton; (penalty scored) MacPherson; (penalty scored) Brown; (penalty scored) Fotheringham

16 August 2016	**Stranraer**	**7–1**	Spartans	Stranraer
19:45	Malcolm 27', 40', 43', 54'; McGuigan 49' (pen.); Gibson 58'; Turner 84'	SPFL report	Malone 86'	Stadium: Stair Park; Attendance: 326; Referee: Craig Napier

16 August 2016	**Albion Rovers**	**2–0**	Hamilton Academical U20s	Coatbridge
19:45	R. Dunlop 18'; Ferry 55'	SPFL report		Stadium: Exsel Group Stadium; Attendance: 114; Referee: Scott Millar

16 August 2016	Motherwell U20s	**1–2**	**Airdrieonians**	Motherwell
19:45	Mackin 54'	SPFL report	Russell 45+1'; Ryan 49'	Stadium: Fir Park; Attendance: 1,007; Referee: Mike Taylor

16 August 2016	Cowdenbeath	**1–2**	**Celtic U20s**	Cowdenbeath
19:45	Todorov 30'	SPFL report	Aitchison 52'; Crossan 71'	Stadium: Central Park; Attendance: 449; Referee: Steven Kirkland

17 August 2016	Rangers U20s	**1–3**	**Stenhousemuir**	Stirling
19:30	Hardie 62'	SPFL report	McMenamin 7'; Cook 38'; R. McCrorie 58' (o.g.)	Stadium: Forthbank Stadium; Attendance: 324; Referee: Grant Irvine

== Third round ==
The draw for the third round was made on Thursday 18 August at 1pm at The Kelpies and was streamed live on Periscope by Irn-Bru's football Twitter account. The 12 teams advancing from the second round will be joined by the ten teams from the 2016–17 Scottish Championship and the bottom two teams from the 2015–16 Scottish Championship.

The third round ties took place on Saturday 3 and Sunday 4 September 2016.

=== North Section ===
==== Draw and seeding ====
Teams from Pot A will be drawn against teams from Pot B. Teams in Bold advanced to the fourth round.

Pot A	Pot B
01. **Dundee United**; 02. **Falkirk**; 03. **Hibernian**; 04. Raith Rovers; 05. **Alloa Athletic**; 06. **Dunfermline Athletic**	07. Peterhead; 08. Brechin City; 09. **Forfar Athletic**; 10. East Fife; 11. Elgin City; 12. Turriff United

==== Matches ====
3 September 2016	**Alloa Athletic**	**3–0**	East Fife	Alloa
15:00	Kirkpatrick 12'; Waters 16'; Spence 45+1'	SPFL report		Stadium: Recreation Park; Attendance: 444; Referee: Kevin Graham

3 September 2016	Brechin City	**1–5**	**Dunfermline Athletic**	Brechin
15:00	Love 27'	SPFL report	Ashcroft 17', 90+2'; Hill 25' (o.g.); McMullan 49'; Reilly 80'	Stadium: Glebe Park; Attendance: 577; Referee: Crawford Allan

3 September 2016	**Dundee United**	**3–2** (a.e.t.)	Peterhead	Dundee
15:00	Telfer 1'; Van der Velden 34'; Andreu 116'	SPFL report	McAllister 28', 35'	Stadium: Tannadice Park; Attendance: 3,520; Referee: Nick Walsh

3 September 2016	**Falkirk**	**6–1**	Elgin City	Falkirk
15:00	McHugh 5', 55'; Hippolyte 32'; Baird 43', 71'; McCracken 48'	SPFL report	Nicolson 38'	Stadium: Falkirk Stadium; Attendance: 1,591; Referee: Mat Northcroft

3 September 2016	**Forfar Athletic**	**3–2**	Raith Rovers	Forfar
15:00	Milne 31'; Peters 37', 57'	SPFL report	Stewart 19'; McManus 67'	Stadium: Station Park; Attendance: 690; Referee: Alan Newlands

4 September 2016	Turriff United	**0–3**	**Hibernian**	Turriff
15:00		SPFL report	Murray 16'; Graham 21'; Boyle 76'	Stadium: The Haughs; Attendance: 1,791; Referee: Euan Anderson

=== South Section ===
==== Draw and seeding ====
Teams from Pot C will be drawn against teams from Pot D. Teams in Bold advanced to the fourth round.

Pot C	Pot D
13. Greenock Morton; 14. **St Mirren**; 15. **Queen of the South**; 16. Dumbarton; 17. **Livingston**; 18. **Ayr United**	19. **Stranraer**; 20. Airdrieonians; 21. Albion Rovers; 22. Stenhousemuir; 23. **Queen's Park**; 24. Celtic U20s

==== Matches ====
3 September 2016	Albion Rovers	**3–4** (a.e.t.)	**St Mirren**	Coatbridge
15:00	R. Dunlop 6', 40'; M. Dunlop 13'	SPFL report	Morgan 30'; Mallan 35'; Sutton 38'; Shankland 98'	Stadium: Cliftonhill; Attendance: 711; Referee: Mike Roncone

3 September 2016	**Queen of the South**	**7–1**	Stenhousemuir	Dumfries
15:00	Hilson 6'; Anderson 10'; Dobbie 33', 46'; Lyle 38' (pen.); Rigg 66', 79'	SPFL report	Cook 81'	Stadium: Palmerston Park; Attendance: 1,158; Referee: Greg Aitken

3 September 2016	**Queen's Park**	**2–0**	Greenock Morton	Glasgow
15:00	Cummins 44'; Galt 46'	SPFL report		Stadium: Hampden Park; Attendance: 1,085; Referee: Gavin Duncan

3 September 2016	**Stranraer**	**1–0**	Dumbarton	Stranraer
15:00	McGuigan 84'	SPFL report		Stadium: Stair Park; Attendance: 401; Referee: John McKendrick

3 September 2016	**Livingston**	**5–1**	Celtic U20s	Livingston
17:15	Buchanan 5', 14' (pen.), 40'; Crighton 17'; Mullen 35'	SPFL report	Hendry 43'	Stadium: Almondvale; Referee: Steven Kirkland

4 September 2016	**Ayr United**	**3–2** (a.e.t.)	Airdrieonians	Ayr
15:00	McGuffie 35'; Forrest 45'; Balatoni 97'	SPFL report	Conroy 14'; Balatoni 49' (o.g.)	Stadium: Somerset Park; Attendance: 1,135; Referee: Barry Cook

== Fourth round ==
The 12 teams advancing from the third round were to be joined by the four teams that finished first and second in the 2015–16 NIFL Premiership and the 2015–16 Welsh Premier League.

=== Draw and seeding ===
The draw for the fourth round was made at the Oriam National Performance Centre, Heriot Watt University in Edinburgh on Tuesday, 6 September at 12pm. The draw was made by John Hartson and IRN-BRU super fan Michael Douglas. There was no seeding for the draw however, teams for Northern Ireland and Wales could not be drawn against each other. As a result, they were placed into two separate pots (A and B) before being drawn against the remaining Scottish teams (Pot C). The Welsh teams were drawn first followed by the Northern Irish teams with one of each playing at home and one away.

Teams in Bold advanced to the quarter-finals.

Pot A (Wales) Welsh Premier League	Pot B (Northern Ireland) NIFL Premiership	Pot C (Scotland) SPFL
01. **The New Saints**; 02. Bala Town	03. Crusaders; 04. Linfield	05. **Dundee United**; 06. Falkirk; 07. Hibernian; 08. **St Mirren**; 09. **Queen of the South**; 10. **Livingston**; 11. **Alloa Athletic**; 12. **Dunfermline Athletic**; 13. **Ayr United**; 14. Stranraer; 15. Forfar Athletic; 16. Queen's Park

=== Matches ===
7 October 2016	Crusaders	**Void**	Livingston	Belfast, Northern Ireland
19:45	Owens 87'	SPFL	Buchanan 74'; Pittman 90+4'	Stadium: Seaview; Referee: David Morgan

7 October 2016	**Ayr United**	**1–0** (a.e.t.)	Falkirk	Ayr
19:45	Harkins 114'	SPFL		Stadium: Somerset Park; Attendance: 1,247; Referee: Alan Muir

8 October 2016	Bala Town	**2–4**	**Alloa Athletic**	Bala, Wales
13:00	Hunt 60' (pen.); S. Jones 73'	SPFL Report	Spence 10', 45+2'; Robertson 43'; Cawley 65'	Stadium: Maes Tegid; Attendance: 591; Referee: Steven Taylor

8 October 2016	Stranraer	**0–1**	**Dundee United**	Stranraer
14:00		SPFL Report	Andreu 68'	Stadium: Stair Park; Attendance: 629; Referee: Greg Aitken

8 October 2016	Forfar Athletic	**1–3**	**The New Saints**	Forfar
15:00	Malcolm 68'	SPFL Report	Draper 24', 80', 87'	Stadium: Station Park; Attendance: 691; Referee: Evan Boyce

8 October 2016	Hibernian	**1–2**	**St Mirren**	Edinburgh
15:00	Harris 37'	SPFL Report	Mallan 41'; Clarkson 82'	Stadium: Easter Road; Attendance: 4,393; Referee: Willie Collum

8 October 2016	**Dunfermline Athletic**	**2–1**	Queen's Park	Dunfermline
15:00	El Alagui 48', 62'	SPFL Report	El Alagui 70' (o.g.)	Stadium: East End Park; Attendance: 1,930; Referee: Nick Walsh

9 October 2016	**Queen of the South**	**2–0** (a.e.t.)	Linfield	Dumfries
13:00	Dykes 102'; Dobbie 109'	SPFL Report		Stadium: Palmerston Park; Attendance: 2,358; Referee: Iwan Griffith

=== Replay ===
1 November 2016	Crusaders	**0–3**	**Livingston**	Belfast, Northern Ireland
19:45		SPFL report	Cadden 66'; De Vita 74'; Buchanan 89'	Stadium: Seaview; Referee: Nick Pratt

Notes

1. A- Livingston's 2–1 win against Crusaders on Friday, 7 October was ordered to be replayed after Livingston pleaded guilty to a breach of SPFL rules in the original fixture. The club was fined £4,000 after they played Alan Lithgow for the full 90 minutes. Lithgow was ineligible for the match as he was still under an SFA suspension at the time.

== Quarter-finals ==
=== Draw ===
The draw for the quarter-finals was made at the Titan Crane on the River Clyde in Clydebank on Monday, 10 October at 2pm and was streamed live on Periscope by Irn-Bru's football Twitter account. The draw was made by former Dundee United and Scotland striker Kevin Gallacher and Rio 2016 silver medallist Dan Wallace. There was no seeding for the draw however, as with the previous round, teams from Northern Ireland and Wales, should they qualify, would not be drawn against each other. The ties took place on the weekend of 12 and 13 November.

Teams in Bold advanced to the semi-finals.

(Wales) Welsh Premier League	(Scotland) SPFL
01. **The New Saints**	02. **Dundee United**; 03. **St Mirren**; 04. **Queen of the South**; 05. Livingston; 06. Alloa Athletic; 07. Dunfermline Athletic; 08. Ayr United

=== Matches ===
12 November 2016	Dunfermline Athletic	**0–1**	**Dundee United**	Dunfermline
12:30		SPFL report	Durnan 8'	Stadium: East End Park; Attendance: 2,576; Referee: Willie Collum

12 November 2016	**Queen of the South**	**2–0**	Alloa Athletic	Dumfries
15:00	Dobbie 41', 76'	SPFL report		Stadium: Palmerston Park; Attendance: 1,180; Referee: Euan Anderson

13 November 2016	**St Mirren**	**2–1**	Ayr United	Paisley
12:30	Sutton 83', 85'	SPFL report	O'Connell 68'	Stadium: St Mirren Park; Attendance: 2,199; Referee: Crawford Allan

13 November 2016	Livingston	**0–3**	**The New Saints**	Livingston
16:05		SPFL report	Parry 36'; Saunders 58'; Quigley 70'	Stadium: Almondvale Stadium; Attendance: 733; Referee: Raymond Crangle

== Semi-finals ==
=== Draw ===
The draw for the semi-finals was made at the Toryglen Regional Football Centre in Glasgow on Monday, 14 November and streamed live on Periscope by Irn-Bru's football Twitter account. The draw was made by former Manchester City and Scotland striker Paul Dickov and current Scotland and Hibernian striker Abi Harrison. There was no seeding for the draw and the ties are due to take place on the weekend of 18 and 19 February 2017.

Teams in Bold advanced to the final.

(Scotland) Championship	(Wales) Welsh Premier League
**Dundee United**; Queen of the South; **St. Mirren**	The New Saints

=== Matches ===
18 February 2017	Queen of the South	**2–3**	**Dundee United**	Dumfries
17:15	Dobbie 51'; Lyle 90+1'	SPFL Report	Telfer 3'; Fraser 11'; Andreu 35'	Stadium: Palmerston Park; Attendance: 1,526; Referee: Nick Walsh

19 February 2017	**St Mirren**	**4–1**	The New Saints	Paisley
16:10	McGinn 60'; Mallan 65'; Sutton 80'; Loy 90+1'	SPFL Report	Brobbel 41'	Stadium: St Mirren Park; Attendance: 2,044; Referee: Keith Kennedy

== Final ==
25 March 2017
12:30

Dundee United	2–1	St Mirren
Andreu 37'; Mikkelsen 75'	BBC report	Loy 38'

Fir Park, Motherwell
Attendance: 8,089
Referee: Nick Walsh

== Statistics ==
=== Top goalscorers ===
As of matches played on 19 February 2017

Rank	Player	Club	Goals
1	(Scotland) Stephen Dobbie	Queen of the South	6
2	(Scotland) Josh Peters	Forfar Athletic	4
2	(Scotland) Liam Buchanan	Livingston	4
2	(Scotland) Craig Malcolm	Stranraer	4
2	(England) John Sutton	St Mirren	4
6	(Scotland) Scott Wright	Aberdeen U20s	3
6	(Scotland) Ross Dunlop	Albion Rovers	3
6	(Scotland) Greig Spence	Alloa Athletic	3
6	(France) Tony Andreu	Dundee United	3
6	(Scotland) Kevin Nisbet	Partick Thistle U20s	3
6	(Scotland) Rory McAllister	Peterhead	3
6	(New Zealand) Greg Draper	The New Saints	3
6	(Scotland) Stevie Mallan	St Mirren	3

== Player of the Round ==
The Golden Ball Award is a 'Player of the Round' award given to the player who is adjudged to have had the best performance of that round out of all the players in teams left competing in that round of the competition. The winner is voted for by supporters from a chosen short-list of players on the official Irn-Bru Football twitter page.

Round	Player	Club	Match	Ref
First Round	(Scotland) Josh Jeffries	Rangers U20s	4–0 v Stirling University (H)	
Second Round	(Scotland) Craig Malcolm	Stranraer	7–1 v Spartans (H)	
Third Round	(Scotland) Stephen Dobbie	Queen of the South	7–1 v Stenhousemuir (H)	
Fourth Round	(Morocco) Farid El Alagui	Dunfermline Athletic	2–1 v Queen's Park (H)	
Quarter-finals	(England) John Sutton	St Mirren	2–1 v Ayr United (H)	
Semi-finals	(Scotland) Stevie Mallan	St Mirren	4–1 v The New Saints (H)	

== Broadcasting rights ==
The domestic broadcasting rights for the competition are held jointly by BBC Alba, S4C (for matches involving Welsh teams) and subscription channel Premier Sports. Prior to the re-format in the 2016–17 season, BBC Alba had exclusive rights.

The following matches are to be broadcast live on UK television:

Round	BBC Alba	S4C	Premier Sports
First Round		N/A	Celtic U20s v Annan Athletic
Second Round		N/A	Cowdenbeath v Celtic U20s
Third Round	Turriff United v Hibernian	N/A	Livingston v Celtic U20s
Fourth Round	Queen of the South v Linfield	Bala Town v Alloa Athletic	Crusaders v Livingston (original tie)
Quarter-Finals	Livingston v The New Saints	Livingston v The New Saints	Dunfermline Athletic v Dundee United; St Mirren v Ayr United
Semi-Finals	Queen of the South v Dundee United; St Mirren v The New Saints	St Mirren v The New Saints	
Final	Dundee United v St Mirren		
