= Jamie Duff =

Scottish footballer

Personal information
- Full name: James Alasdair Duff
- Date of birth: 26 January 1989 (age 37)
- Place of birth: Inverness, Scotland
- Position: Centre back

Team information
- Current team: Rothes

Youth career
- 2007–2008: Inverness Caledonian Thistle

Senior career*
Years	Team	Apps	(Gls)
2008–2010	Inverness Caledonian Thistle	14	(0)
2010–2016	Elgin City	163	(11)
2016–2018	Brora Rangers		
2018–2020	Rothes		

International career^{‡}
2008	Scotland U21	1	(0)
- * Club domestic league appearances and goals as of 14:00, 3 November 2016 (UTC) ‡ National team caps and goals as of 23 November 2008

James Alasdair Duff (born 26 January 1989 in Inverness, Scotland) is a Scottish retired professional association football player, who last featured as a centre-back for Rothes.

Duff broke into the Inverness Caledonian Thistle first team during the early part of the 2008–09 season, making his senior début in a 1–0 defeat by Hamilton Academical. He signed for Elgin City in 2010. Duff left Elgin after six years, signing for Highland Football League side Brora Rangers in November 2016.

Duff represented the Scotland under–21 level team for the first time in a 3–1 defeat against Northern Ireland in November 2008.

== Career statistics ==
Appearances and goals by club, season and competition
Club	Season	League			FA Cup		League Cup		Other^{[A]}		Total	
Club	Season	Division	Apps	Goals	Apps	Goals	Apps	Goals	Apps	Goals	Apps	Goals
Inverness Caledonian Thistle	2007–08	Scottish Premier League	0	0	0	0	0	0	0	0	0	0
Inverness Caledonian Thistle	2008–09	Scottish Premier League	11	0	0	0	3	0	0	0	14	0
Inverness Caledonian Thistle	2009–10	Scottish First Division	3	0	0	0	0	0	0	0	3	0
Inverness Caledonian Thistle	Total		14	0	0	0	3	0	0	0	17	0
Elgin City	2010–11	Scottish Third Division	24	1	1	0	0	0	0	0	25	1
Elgin City	2011–12	Scottish Third Division	33	2	0	0	1	0	1	0	35	2
Elgin City	2012–13	Scottish Third Division	28	4	1	0	0	0	1	0	30	4
Elgin City	2013–14	Scottish League Two	34	2	2	1	1	0	1	0	38	3
Elgin City	2014–15	Scottish League Two	26	2	1	0	0	0	0	0	27	2
Elgin City	2015–16	Scottish League Two	18	0	0	0	1	0	4	1	23	1
Elgin City	Total		163	11	5	1	3	0	7	1	178	13
Career total			176	11	5	1	6	0	7	1	194	13

A. The "Other" column constitutes appearances (including substitutes) and goals in the Scottish Challenge Cup.
