= Graham Taylor (footballer, born 1998) =

Scottish footballer

Personal information
- Date of birth: 19 March 1998 (age 28)
- Place of birth: Stirling, Scotland
- Position: Midfielder

Team information
- Current team: Camelon Juniors

Youth career
- 2008–2018: Dundee United

Senior career*
Years	Team	Apps	(Gls)
2015–2018	Dundee United	0	(0)
2018	→ Edinburgh City (loan)	14	(2)
2018–2019	Edinburgh City	32	(2)
2019–2021	Cowdenbeath	23	(1)
2021–2023	Berwick Rangers		
2023-	Camelon Juniors		
- * Club domestic league appearances and goals as of 15:00, 14 August 2021 (UTC)

Graham Taylor (born 19 March 1998) is a Scottish footballer, who plays as a midfielder for Scottish club Camelon Juniors.

Taylor started his career with Dundee United, making his debut for them in November 2016. He had a short spell on loan with Edinburgh City, which became permanent in June 2018 following his release from Dundee United. He then signed for Cowdenbeath in 2019 before joining Berwick in 2021 and left for Camelon Juniors.

== Playing career ==
=== Dundee United ===
Taylor signed his first professional contract with Dundee United in 2015, having been part of their youth academy for seven years. He had travelled daily from his home in Stirling to attend the club's development programme based at St John's Roman Catholic High School in Dundee.

Taylor's performances at development team level led to his inclusion in the first team squad for Scottish Challenge Cup matches during the 2016-17 season. After being an unused substitute against Peterhead, he made his debut as a substitute against Dunfermline Athletic on 12 November 2016. During the early part of the 2017–18 season, Taylor appeared in a number of further cup fixtures, and was named man of the match against Linfield in the Challenge Cup in October 2017.

In January 2018, Dundee United sent Taylor to League Two club Edinburgh City on a development loan for the rest of the season. Dundee United announced on 26 April 2018 that Taylor was one of four players who would be leaving the club, having not been offered a new contract.

=== Edinburgh City ===
In June 2018, Taylor was signed by Edinburgh City on a permanent basis.

=== Cowdenbeath ===
On 12 July 2019, Taylor signed for Cowdenbeath.

=== Berwick Rangers ===
Taylor signed with Lowland League club Berwick Rangers in the summer of 2021.

== Career statistics ==
As of match played 14 September 2019

Appearances and goals by club, season and competition
Club	Season	League			Scottish Cup		League Cup		Other		Total	
Club	Season	Division	Apps	Goals	Apps	Goals	Apps	Goals	Apps	Goals	Apps	Goals
Dundee United	2015–16	Scottish Premiership	0	0	0	0	0	0	—		0	0
Dundee United	2016–17	Scottish Championship	0	0	0	0	0	0	1 (Note: Appearances in the Scottish Challenge Cup)	0	1	0
Dundee United	2017–18	Scottish Championship	0	0	0	0	0	0	3	0	3	0
Dundee United	Total		0	0	0	0	0	0	4	0	4	0
Edinburgh City (loan)	2017–18	Scottish League Two	14	2	0	0	0	0	0	0	14	2
Edinburgh City	2018–19	Scottish League Two	32	2	3	0	4	0	7 (Note: Five appearances in the Scottish Challenge Cup and two appearances in the Scottish League One play-offs)	0	46	2
Cowdenbeath	2019–20	Scottish League Two	6	0	0	0	4	1	0	0	10	1
Career total			52	4	3	0	8	1	11	0	79	5
