= Jordie Briels =

Dutch professional footballer

Personal information
- Date of birth: 26 November 1991 (age 34)
- Place of birth: Weert, Netherlands
- Height: 1.76 m (5 ft 9 in)
- Position: Midfielder

Team information
- Current team: Turkse Rangers

Youth career
- MMC Weert
- –2009: Fortuna Sittard
- 2009–2012: Genk

Senior career*
| Years | Team | Apps | (Gls) |
| 2012–2017 | Fortuna Sittard | 146 | (7) |
| 2017–2018 | Dundee United | 10 | (0) |
| 2018–2020 | TOP Oss | 1 | (0) |
| 2020 | → Diest (loan) | | |
| 2020–2023 | Diest | 24 | (0) |
| 2023–2024 | Turkse Rangers | | |
| 2024–2025 | Bregel Sport | | |
| 2025 | Turkse Rangers | | |
| 2026– | Turkse Rangers | | |
- * Club domestic league appearances and goals as of 00:21, 3 February 2026 (UTC)

Jordie Briels (born 26 November 1991) is a Dutch footballer who plays as a midfielder for Turkse Rangers.

== Club career ==
Born in Weert, Briels played in the youth academy of Belgian side Genk, but signed professional terms with Fortuna Sittard in 2012. Briels signed a one-year contract with Scottish club Dundee United in July 2017, spending the year with the club before being released following the end of his contract. He joined Eerste Divisie side TOP Oss in 2018 and they sent him on loan to Belgian club Diest. Diest made the deal permanent and Briels left them in 2023.

He then joined Belgian amateur side Turkse Rangers alsongside compatriot Guus Hupperts.

== Career statistics ==
As of match played 14 October 2017

Appearances and goals by club, season and competition
| Club | Season | League | | | National Cup | | League Cup | | Other | | Total | |
| Club | Season | Division | Apps | Goals | Apps | Goals | Apps | Goals | Apps | Goals | Apps | Goals |
|---|---|---|---|---|---|---|---|---|---|---|---|---|
| Fortuna Sittard | 2012–13 | Eerste Divisie | 22 | 0 | 0 | 0 | ~ | ~ | 0 | 0 | 22 | 0 |
| Fortuna Sittard | 2013–14 | Eerste Divisie | 28 | 3 | 1 | 0 | ~ | ~ | 2 (Note: Appearances in the Eerste Divisie promotion play-offs) | 0 | 31 | 3 |
| Fortuna Sittard | 2014–15 | Eerste Divisie | 32 | 2 | 2 | 1 | ~ | ~ | 0 | 0 | 34 | 3 |
| Fortuna Sittard | 2015–16 | Eerste Divisie | 33 | 1 | 1 | 0 | ~ | ~ | 0 | 0 | 34 | 1 |
| Fortuna Sittard | 2016–17 | Eerste Divisie | 31 | 1 | 1 | 0 | ~ | ~ | 0 | 0 | 32 | 1 |
| Fortuna Sittard | Fortuna Sittard total | | 146 | 7 | 5 | 1 | ~ | ~ | 2 | 0 | 153 | 8 |
| Dundee United | 2017–18 | Scottish Championship | 7 | 0 | 0 | 0 | 5 | 0 | 1 (Note: Appearance in the Scottish Challenge Cup) | 0 | 13 | 0 |
| Career total | | | 153 | 7 | 5 | 1 | 5 | 0 | 3 | 0 | 166 | 8 |
