= Idris Kadded =

French footballer (born 1998)

Personal information
- Full name: Idris Kadded Benoit
- Date of birth: 2 November 1998 (age 28)
- Place of birth: Lyon, France
- Height: 1.80 m (5 ft 11 in)
- Position: Forward

Team information
- Current team: Montreuil FC

Youth career
- Nice

Senior career*
Years	Team	Apps	(Gls)
2016–2017	Nice II	1	(0)
2017–2018	FC Vaulx-en-Velin	6	(0)
2018	Dundee United	1	(0)
2019	Nottingham Forest	0	(0)
2019–2020	Red Star B	0	(0)
2020	Lusitanos Saint-Maur	6	(1)
2021–2022	FC 93	8	(1)
2022–2023	Lusitanos Saint-Maur B		
2023–2025	JA Drancy	39	(9)
2025–	Montreuil FC		
- * Club domestic league appearances and goals as of 7 February 2026

Idris Kadded Benoit (born 2 November 1998) is a French footballer who plays as a forward for Montreuil FC.

== Playing career ==
Kadded was born in Lyon and played for Nice as a youth player. He made one appearance for the club's reserve team in National 2, against Hyères in January 2017. After being released by Nice, he joined Vaulx-en-Velin in National 3 prior to the 2017–18 season. Having made six league appearances without scoring, he went on trial to Scottish Championship club Dundee United in January 2018 and was subsequently offered a contract. Kadded signed as an amateur for the rest of the season with Dundee United on 20 January 2018, and made his debut the same day as a substitute in a Scottish Cup tie against Alloa Athletic. Manager Csaba László stated that, despite his amateur status, he would consider Kadded as a first team player. Kadded left the club at the end of the season, having made only one further substitute appearance.

On 1 January 2019, Kadded signed a six-month contract with Nottingham Forest.

After returning to France with Red Star B for a season, Kadded signed with Lusitanos Saint-Maur on 15 July 2020.

== Personal life ==
Born in France, Kadded is of Algerian descent.
