= Brad Smith (Scottish footballer) =

Scottish footballer

Personal information
- Full name: Bradley Smith
- Date of birth: 23 April 1997 (age 29)
- Place of birth: Dundee, Scotland
- Height: 6 ft 0 in (1.83 m)
- Position: Midfielder

Team information
- Current team: Broughty Athletic

Youth career
- 2006–2016: Dundee United

Senior career*
Years	Team	Apps	(Gls)
2016–2017	Dundee United	2	(0)
2017	→ Albion Rovers (loan)	2	(0)
2017–2019	Cowdenbeath	40	(2)
2019–	Broughty Athletic		
- * Club domestic league appearances and goals as of 15:28, 26 January 2019 (UTC)

Bradley Smith (born 23 April 1997) is a Scottish footballer who plays as a midfielder for Scottish Junior Football East Region Super League club Broughty Athletic. He began his career with Dundee United, making his first team debut in May 2016. He was released in 2017 after a period on loan to Albion Rovers and subsequently also played for Cowdenbeath.

== Early life ==
Brad Smith was born in Dundee on 23 April 1997. He was at the Dundee United Academy for seven years before signing a professional contract in July 2013.

== Playing career ==
=== Club ===
In December 2015, Smith signed a contract extension that would keep him at Dundee United until May 2018. He made his first team debut against Partick Thistle in a Scottish Premiership match on 10 May 2016. He was loaned out to Albion Rovers of Scottish League One in February 2017 until the end of the 2016–17 season. His contract with Dundee United was cancelled by mutual consent in August 2017.

Smith played for as a trialist for Cowdenbeath against Edinburgh City in Scottish League Two on 14 August 2017 and subsequently signed for the club. During the 2018–19 season, he was given an extended leave of absence from Cowdenbeath to concentrate on his studies in Dundee. He was allowed to leave the club in January 2019, joining Scottish Junior Football East Region Super League club Broughty Athletic for "a small fee".

== Career statistics ==
As of match played 28 October 2017

Club	Season	League			Scottish Cup		League Cup		Other		Total	
Club	Season	Division	Apps	Goals	Apps	Goals	Apps	Goals	Apps	Goals	Apps	Goals
Dundee United	2015–16	Premiership	2	0	0	0	0	0	0	0	2	0
Dundee United	2016–17	Championship	0	0	0	0	0	0	1 (Note: Appearances in the Scottish Challenge Cup)	0	1	0
Dundee United	Total		2	0	0	0	0	0	1	0	3	0
Albion Rovers (loan)	2016–17	League One	2	0	0	0	0	0	0	0	2	0
Cowdenbeath	2017–18	League Two	8	0	1	0	0	0	1	0	10	0
Career Total			12	0	1	0	0	0	2	0	15	0
