= Logan Martin (footballer) =

French footballer (born 1997)

Personal information
- Date of birth: 19 November 1997 (age 28)
- Place of birth: France
- Position: Midfielder

Youth career
- Cannes
- 2015–2016: Benfica
- 2016–2017: Genoa

Senior career*
Years	Team	Apps	(Gls)
2018	Dundee United	1	(0)
- * Club domestic league appearances and goals as of 19:46, 29 January 2018 (UTC)

Logan Martin (born 19 November 1997) is a French footballer who plays as a midfielder. A former youth player with Cannes in France, Benfica in Portugal and Genoa in Italy, he joined Dundee United for a short spell in 2018.

== Early life ==
Logan Martin was born on 19 November 1997. He is the son of former professional footballer Lilian Martin, whose clubs included Monaco and Olympique Marseille.

== Playing career ==
Martin began his youth career in France with AS Cannes. He signed his first professional contract in September 2015, with Portuguese club Benfica, and played for them in the 2015-16 UEFA Youth League. He then joined Italian club Genoa in September 2016. In January 2018 he went on trial to Scottish Championship club Dundee United and was subsequently offered a contract. Having signed for the club as an amateur for the rest of the season, he made his senior debut in a 3–0 defeat against Greenock Morton on 27 January 2018. Dundee United announced on 26 April 2018 that Martin was one of four players who would be leaving the club, having not been offered a new contract.
