= 2015–16 Lowland Football League =

Lowland League
- Season: 2015–16
- Champions: Edinburgh City
- Promoted: Edinburgh City
- Relegated: Threave Rovers
- Matches: 210
- Goals: 786 (3.74 per match)
- Top goalscorer: Ross Allum (Edinburgh City) (27 goals)
- Longest winning run: 8 matches: Edinburgh City
- Longest unbeaten run: 18 matches: Edinburgh City
- Longest losing run: 17 matches: Threave Rovers

The 2015–16 Lowland League was the third season of the Lowland Football League. The season began on 1 August 2015 and ended on 19 May 2016. Edinburgh City were the defending champions. Cumbernauld Colts were elected to the league as new members.

The league was won by Edinburgh City with two matches remaining on 9 April 2016, securing their second title after a 1–0 win over Stirling University. They played the champions of the 2015–16 Highland League (Cove Rangers) in the semi-finals of the League Two play-offs, winning 4-1 on aggregate.

Edinburgh City then drew 1–1 at home in the first leg of the play-off final against East Stirlingshire, before scoring a late penalty to win 1–0 away from home in the second leg, winning 2–1 on aggregate to gain a place in Scottish League Two.

== Teams ==
Location of teams in 2015–16 Scottish Lowland Football League

The following teams have changed division prior to the 2015–16 season.

=== To Lowland League ===
Transferred from Caledonian Amateur Football League

- Cumbernauld Colts

=== Stadia and Locations ===
Team	Location	Home ground	Capacity	Ref.
BSC Glasgow	Glasgow	Lochburn Park (Maryhill)	1,800	
Cumbernauld Colts	Cumbernauld	Broadwood Stadium	7,936	
Dalbeattie Star	Dalbeattie	Islecroft Stadium	3,500	
East Kilbride	East Kilbride	K Park Training Academy	400	
Edinburgh City	Edinburgh	Meadowbank Stadium	16,500	
Edinburgh University	Edinburgh	New East Peffermill	1,000	
Gala Fairydean Rovers	Galashiels	Netherdale	4,000	
Gretna 2008	Gretna	Raydale Park	2,200	
Preston Athletic	Prestonpans	Pennypit Park	4,000	
Selkirk	Selkirk	Yarrow Park	1,162	
The Spartans	Edinburgh	Ainslie Park	3,000	
Stirling University	Stirling	Forthbank Stadium	3,808	
Threave Rovers	Castle Douglas	Meadow Park	1,500	
Vale of Leithen	Innerleithen	Victoria Park	1,500	
Whitehill Welfare	Rosewell	Ferguson Park	2,614	

== League table ==
Threave Rovers were spared automatic relegation as neither champion of the two feeder leagues, Leith Athletic or St Cuthbert Wanderers, met licensing criteria. The club however, declined the opportunity to re-apply to the league and rejoined the South of Scotland Football League for the 2016–17 season.

Pos	Team	Pld	W	D	L	GF	GA	GD	Pts	Promotion, qualification or relegation
1	Edinburgh City (C, O, P)	28	24	1	3	74	28	+46	73	Qualification to League Two play-off semi-finals
2	The Spartans	28	18	4	6	74	36	+38	58	
3	Stirling University	28	17	5	6	65	32	+33	56	
4	Cumbernauld Colts	28	15	6	7	60	42	+18	51	
5	East Kilbride	28	14	7	7	68	44	+24	49	
6	Edinburgh University	28	13	3	12	51	46	+5	42	
7	BSC Glasgow	28	12	5	11	54	51	+3	41	
8	Whitehill Welfare	28	12	4	12	47	43	+4	40	
9	Dalbeattie Star	28	10	6	12	54	50	+4	36	
10	Gretna 2008	28	11	3	14	38	50	−12	36	
11	Gala Fairydean Rovers	28	10	2	16	53	61	−8	32	
12	Selkirk	28	9	2	17	52	70	−18	29	
13	Vale of Leithen	28	7	5	16	38	67	−29	26	
14	Preston Athletic	28	6	4	18	28	70	−42	22	
15	Threave Rovers (R)	28	3	1	24	30	96	−66	10	Resigned at end of season, joined South of Scotland League

Source: Soccerway
Rules for classification: 1) Points; 2) Goal difference; 3) Number of goals scored
(C) Champions; (O) Play-off winners; (P) Promoted; (R) Relegated

== Results ==
Home \ Away	BSC	CUM	DBS	EKB	EDC	EDU	GFR	G08	PRA	SEL	SPA	SLU	THR	VOL	WHW
BSC Glasgow		0–4	2–1	1–0	1–3	0–2	3–3	2–4	3–1	2–2	2–2	3–3	7–3	2–1	2–0
Cumbernauld Colts	2–1		4–0	1–1	1–2	2–2	2–1	4–1	5–1	1–0	0–4	1–1	2–1	0–1	2–3
Dalbeattie Star	0–2	0–2		1–2	1–0	2–2	1–2	1–0	1–2	2–3	1–2	2–2	7–1	2–1	1–1
East Kilbride	2–1	1–1	2–2		1–2	6–0	2–1	4–1	1–1	5–4	0–1	2–2	4–0	5–2	1–2
Edinburgh City	2–0	3–1	5–2	1–1		5–0	3–0	3–0	4–1	4–2	1–0	1–0	3–0	3–1	1–4
Edinburgh University	3–2	4–0	1–2	0–4	1–2		4–1	2–0	1–0	3–2	3–4	0–1	4–0	0–0	5–0
Gala Fairydean Rovers	4–3	2–2	1–2	3–2	1–3	0–5		0–2	1–0	3–1	2–6	1–3	5–0	7–0	0–1
Gretna 2008	0–0	0–2	0–0	4–5	0–3	0–5	0–2		3–2	0–3	1–0	2–1	3–0	3–1	1–0
Preston Athletic	0–4	0–2	1–4	2–0	2–8	2–1	0–3	0–2		0–1	0–7	0–5	5–0	2–2	1–1
Selkirk	1–2	3–5	1–4	1–5	1–2	2–0	2–1	1–5	1–2		3–2	1–2	3–1	1–3	0–4
The Spartans	2–1	3–0	4–2	1–1	2–3	5–0	3–1	2–1	1–1	5–2		1–0	4–1	4–1	3–2
Stirling University	0–3	1–2	3–1	3–0	3–1	1–0	4–2	3–1	5–1	2–1	1–1		4–1	2–0	3–1
Threave Rovers	0–3	1–4	3–4	3–4	1–2	1–2	1–4	1–2	0–1	3–5	0–3	0–6		1–1	3–1
Vale of Leithen	5–0	3–3	1–8	1–4	1–3	2–0	3–2	1–1	1–0	1–4	1–0	1–3	1–2		0–2
Whitehill Welfare	1–2	2–4	0–0	2–3	0–1	0–1	3–0	2–1	3–0	1–1	5–2	2–1	1–2	3–2	

Source: Soccerway
Legend: Blue = home team win; Yellow = draw; Red = away team win.

== Lowland Football League play-off ==
It was proposed that the respective winners of the 2015–16 East of Scotland Football League (Leith Athletic) and 2015–16 South of Scotland Football League (St Cuthbert Wanderers) leagues would meet in a play-off, with the winner taking a place in next season's Lowland League. However, neither met licensing criteria so the play-off did not take place.
