= 2015–16 Scottish League Two =

Scottish League Two
- Season: 2015–16
- Champions: East Fife
- Promoted: East Fife; Queen's Park
- Relegated: East Stirlingshire
- Matches: 180
- Goals: 517 (2.87 per match)
- Top goalscorer: Nathan Austin (22 goals)
- Biggest home win: Stirling Albion 7–0 Montrose (9 February 2016)
- Biggest away win: Stirling Albion 0–6 East Fife (19 March 2016)
- Highest scoring: East Fife 5–3 East Stirlingshire (14 November 2015)
- Longest winning run: 4 matches: Clyde; East Fife; Elgin City
- Longest unbeaten run: 7 matches: East Fife
- Longest winless run: 8 matches: Montrose
- Longest losing run: 6 matches: Berwick Rangers
- Highest attendance: 1,387; Montrose 0–2 Arbroath (2 January 2016)
- Lowest attendance: 238; East Stirlingshire 3–1 Montrose (21 November 2015); Berwick Rangers 3–2 Annan Athletic (16 February 2016)
- Total attendance: 99,947
- Average attendance: 555
- All statistics correct as of 1 May 2016.

The 2015–16 Scottish League Two (referred to as the Ladbrokes League Two for sponsorship reasons) was the 22nd season in the current format of 10 teams in the fourth-tier of Scottish football. The last placed team entered a play-off with a team nominated by the Scottish Football Association from outside the SPFL to determine which team enters League Two in the 2016–17 season.

== Teams ==
=== To League Two ===
Relegated from Scottish League One

- Stirling Albion

=== From League Two ===
Promoted to Scottish League One

- Albion Rovers

=== Stadia and locations ===
Annan Athletic	Arbroath	Berwick Rangers	Clyde
Galabank	Gayfield Park	Shielfield Park	Broadwood Stadium
Capacity: 2,514	Capacity: 6,600	Capacity: 4,500	Capacity: 7,936
East Fife	2015–16 Scottish League Two (Scotland)		East Stirlingshire
Bayview Stadium	2015–16 Scottish League Two (Scotland)		Ochilview Park
Capacity: 1,980	2015–16 Scottish League Two (Scotland)		Capacity: 3,746
Elgin City	Montrose	Queen's Park	Stirling Albion
Borough Briggs	Links Park	Hampden Park	Forthbank Stadium
Capacity: 4,520	Capacity: 3,292	Capacity: 51,866	Capacity: 3,808

=== Personnel ===
Team	Manager	Captain	Manufacturer	Sponsors
Annan Athletic	(Scotland) Jim Chapman	(Scotland) Steven Black	Stanno	M&S Engineering Ltd
Arbroath	(Scotland) Dick Campbell	(Scotland) Mark Whatley	Pendle	Megatech
Berwick Rangers	(United States) John Coughlin	(England) Jonny Fairbairn	Zoo Sport	Automatic Retailing Vending Ltd
Clyde	(Scotland) Barry Ferguson	(Scotland) Mark McLaughlin	Hummel	Cash for Kids
East Fife	(Scotland) Gary Naysmith	(Scotland) Steven Campbell	Joma	OLS Laundry Service
East Stirlingshire	(Scotland) Craig Tully	(England) Richard Barnard	Jako	Shire Trust
Elgin City	(Scotland) Jim Weir	(Scotland) Jamie Duff	EC 1893	McDonald & Munro
Montrose	(Scotland) Paul Hegarty	(Scotland) Paul Watson	Nike	Intervention Rentals
Queen's Park	(Scotland) Gus MacPherson	(Scotland) Tony Quinn	Under Armour	Irn-Bru
Stirling Albion	(Scotland) Stuart McLaren	(Scotland) Ross McMillan	Macron	Prudential

=== Managerial changes ===
Team	Outgoing manager	Manner of departure	Date of vacancy	Position in table	Incoming manager	Date of appointment
Berwick Rangers	(Scotland) Colin Cameron	Sacked	31 October 2015	7th	(United States) John Coughlin	6 November 2015
Arbroath	(England) Todd Lumsden	Sacked	6 March 2016	8th	(Scotland) Dick Campbell	8 March 2016

== League table ==
Pos	Team	Pld	W	D	L	GF	GA	GD	Pts	Promotion, qualification or relegation
1	East Fife (C, P)	36	18	8	10	62	41	+21	62	Promotion to Scottish League One
2	Elgin City	36	17	8	11	59	46	+13	59	Qualification to League One play-offs
3	Clyde	36	17	6	13	56	45	+11	57	Qualification to League One play-offs
4	Queen's Park (O, P)	36	15	11	10	46	32	+14	56	Qualification to League One play-offs
5	Annan Athletic	36	16	8	12	69	57	+12	56	
6	Berwick Rangers	36	14	7	15	45	50	−5	49	
7	Stirling Albion	36	13	9	14	47	46	+1	48	
8	Montrose	36	11	10	15	50	70	−20	43	
9	Arbroath	36	11	6	19	42	51	−9	39	
10	East Stirlingshire (R)	36	9	5	22	41	79	−38	32	Qualification for the League Two play-off final

Source: BBC Sport
Rules for classification: 1) Points; 2) Goal difference; 3) Number of goals scored
(C) Champions; (O) Play-off winners; (P) Promoted; (R) Relegated

== Results ==
Teams play each other four times, twice in the first half of the season (home and away) and twice in the second half of the season (home and away), making a total of 36 games.

=== First half of season ===
Home \ Away	ANN	ARB	BER	CLY	EFI	EST	ELG	MON	QPA	STI
Annan Athletic		2–2	1–0	2–3	2–0	3–1	1–1	3–2	3–1	1–1
Arbroath	0–2		3–1	0–1	1–1	0–0	0–3	3–1	1–2	2–0
Berwick Rangers	0–2	2–2		0–5	1–1	2–1	2–3	2–1	1–0	1–2
Clyde	4–2	0–2	1–1		2–0	3–1	4–2	3–1	0–2	0–1
East Fife	0–1	0–1	5–0	1–0		5–3	2–1	1–1	0–2	1–1
East Stirlingshire	3–1	0–4	0–4	0–3	1–0		2–0	3–1	2–1	2–3
Elgin City	3–2	2–0	4–1	1–1	4–2	4–0		2–0	0–0	1–0
Montrose	1–1	3–0	4–1	2–0	1–4	2–1	2–0		1–6	1–3
Queen's Park	0–1	1–0	0–1	1–1	0–2	5–1	3–1	0–1		1–0
Stirling Albion	1–0	3–1	1–3	0–1	1–3	0–0	3–1	1–0	1–2	

Updated to match(es) played on 8 March 2016. Source: Scottish League 2
Legend: Blue = home team win; Yellow = draw; Red = away team win.

=== Second half of season ===
Home \ Away	ANN	ARB	BER	CLY	EFI	EST	ELG	MON	QPA	STI
Annan Athletic		4–1	1–0	3–3	2–4	1–3	4–2	3–3	1–0	2–2
Arbroath	2–1		1–2	0–1	0–1	3–0	2–3	0–0	0–1	1–1
Berwick Rangers	3–2	3–0		3–0	2–0	2–2	2–0	1–0	1–1	1–0
Clyde	2–1	1–2	2–1		0–0	0–1	1–0	3–3	0–1	3–1
East Fife	4–2	2–1	1–0	2–0		1–1	0–2	3–0	1–1	1–0
East Stirlingshire	0–1	0–3	0–0	2–4	1–3		0–3	2–4	0–3	3–2
Elgin City	2–2	4–1	1–0	1–0	1–3	2–0		1–1	1–1	2–1
Montrose	0–5	0–2	1–0	2–1	2–2	3–2	3–1		1–1	1–1
Queen's Park	1–3	2–1	0–0	2–1	3–0	0–3	0–0	1–1		1–1
Stirling Albion	2–1	1–0	2–1	1–2	0–6	3–0	0–0	7–0	0–0	

Updated to match(es) played on 30 April 2016. Source: Scottish League 2
Legend: Blue = home team win; Yellow = draw; Red = away team win.

== Season statistics ==
=== Scoring ===
==== Top scorers ====
As of matches played on 30 April 2016

Rank	Player	Club	Goals
1	(Scotland) Nathan Austin	East Fife	22
2	(Scotland) Craig Gunn	Elgin City	21
3	(Scotland) Gary Fraser	Montrose	19
4	(Scotland) Blair Henderson	Berwick Rangers	17
5	(England) Peter Weatherson	Annan Athletic	15
6	(England) Josh Todd	Annan Athletic	13

==== Hat-tricks ====
Player	For	Against	Result	Date	Ref
(Scotland) Nathan Austin	East Fife	Montrose	4–1	26 September 2015	
(Scotland) David Gormley^{4}	Clyde	Berwick Rangers	5–0	21 November 2015	
(Scotland) Darren Smith	Stirling Albion	Montrose	3–1	12 December 2015	
(Scotland) Nathan Austin	East Fife	Stirling Albion	3–1	26 December 2015	
(Scotland) Darren Smith	Stirling Albion	Montrose	7–0	9 February 2016	

Note

^{4} Player scored 4 goals

=== Discipline ===
==== Player ====
===== Yellow cards =====
As of matches played on 30 April 2016

Rank	Player	Club	Cards
1	(Scotland) Michael McKenna	Berwick Rangers	13
2	(Scotland) Reece Donaldson	East Stirlingshire	11
3	(Scotland) Steven Notman	Berwick Rangers	10
3	(Scotland) Gary Fraser	Montrose	10
3	(Scotland) Ross Forsyth	Stirling Albion	10
6	(Scotland) Mark McLaughlin	Clyde	9
6	(Scotland) Mark Nicolson	Elgin City	9
6	(Scotland) Ross Smith	Stirling Albion	9
9	(Scotland) Graham Webster	Montrose	8
10	6 players		7

===== Red cards =====
As of matches played on 30 April 2016

Rank	Player	Club	Cards
1	(England) Peter Weatherson	Annan Athletic	2
1	(Scotland) Ricky Little	Arbroath	2
1	(Scotland) Jordan McGregor	Berwick Rangers	2
1	(Scotland) Kevin Walker	Berwick Rangers	2
1	(Scotland) Reece Donaldson	East Stirlingshire	2
1	(Scotland) Ross Smith	Stirling Albion	2
7	33 players		1

==== Club ====
===== Yellow cards =====
As of matches played on 30 April 2016

Rank	Club	Cards
1	Berwick Rangers	74
2	East Stirlingshire	73
3	Stirling Albion	64

===== Red cards =====
As of matches played on 30 April 2016

Rank	Club	Cards
1	Berwick Rangers	8
1	Stirling Albion	8
3	Clyde	7

== Awards ==
=== Monthly awards ===
Month	Manager of the Month		Player of the Month		Ref.
Month	Manager	Club	Player	Club	Ref.
August	(Scotland) Gary Naysmith	East Fife	(Nigeria) Smart Osadolor	Annan Athletic	
September	(Scotland) Gus MacPherson	Queen's Park	(Scotland) Bobby Linn	Arbroath	
October	(Scotland) Paul Hegarty	Montrose	(Scotland) Matty Flynn	Annan Athletic	
November	(Scotland) Barry Ferguson	Clyde	(Scotland) David Gormley	Clyde	
December	(Scotland) Stuart McLaren	Stirling Albion	(Scotland) Darren Smith	Stirling Albion	
January	(Scotland) Jim Weir	Elgin City	(England) Nathan Austin	East Fife	
February	(Scotland) Barry Ferguson	Clyde	(Scotland) Steven Doris	Stirling Albion	
March	(Scotland) Gary Naysmith	East Fife	(Scotland) Kyle Wilkie	East Fife	
April	(United States) John Coughlin	Berwick Rangers	(Scotland) Brian Cameron	Elgin City	

== League Two play-offs ==
The first round was contested between Cove Rangers and Edinburgh City, the winners of the Highland League and Lowland League respectively. City, the winners, then played off against the bottom club in League Two, East Stirlingshire, swapping with them and being promoted to the 2016–17 Scottish League Two with a victory.

=== Semi-finals ===
==== First leg ====
23 April 2016	Cove Rangers	0–3	Edinburgh City	Harlaw Park, Inverurie
15:00		BBC Report	Allum 22', 45'; Donaldson 41'

==== Second leg ====
30 April 2016	Edinburgh City	1–1 (4–1 agg.)	Cove Rangers	Meadowbank Stadium, Edinburgh
15:00	Gair 32'	BBC report	Watt 86'	Attendance: 839

=== Final ===
==== First leg ====
7 May 2016	Edinburgh City	1–1	East Stirlingshire	Meadowbank Stadium, Edinburgh
15:00	Gair 15' (pen.); Mbu (red card) 77'	BBC Report	Wright 42'; Donaldson (red card) 90+1'	Attendance: 1,090; Referee: Gavin Duncan

==== Second leg ====
14 May 2016	East Stirlingshire	0–1 (1–2 agg.)	Edinburgh City	Ochilview Park, Stenhousemuir
15:00	Donaldson (red card) 86'	BBC Report	Gair 87' (pen.)	Attendance: 1,286; Referee: Don Robertson
