= 2015–16 Highland Football League =

Press & Journal Highland League
- Season: 2015–16
- Champions: Cove Rangers
- Biggest home win: Brora Rangers 11–0 Rothes
- Biggest away win: Strathspey Thistle 0–10 Formartine United
- Highest scoring: Clachnacuddin 12–2 Rothes
- Longest winning run: 16 – Cove Rangers
- Longest unbeaten run: 18 – Cove Rangers F.C.
- Longest winless run: 29 – Rothes
- Longest losing run: 15 – Fort William; 15 – Rothes

The 2015–16 Highland Football League started on 25 July 2015 and ended on 7 May 2016.

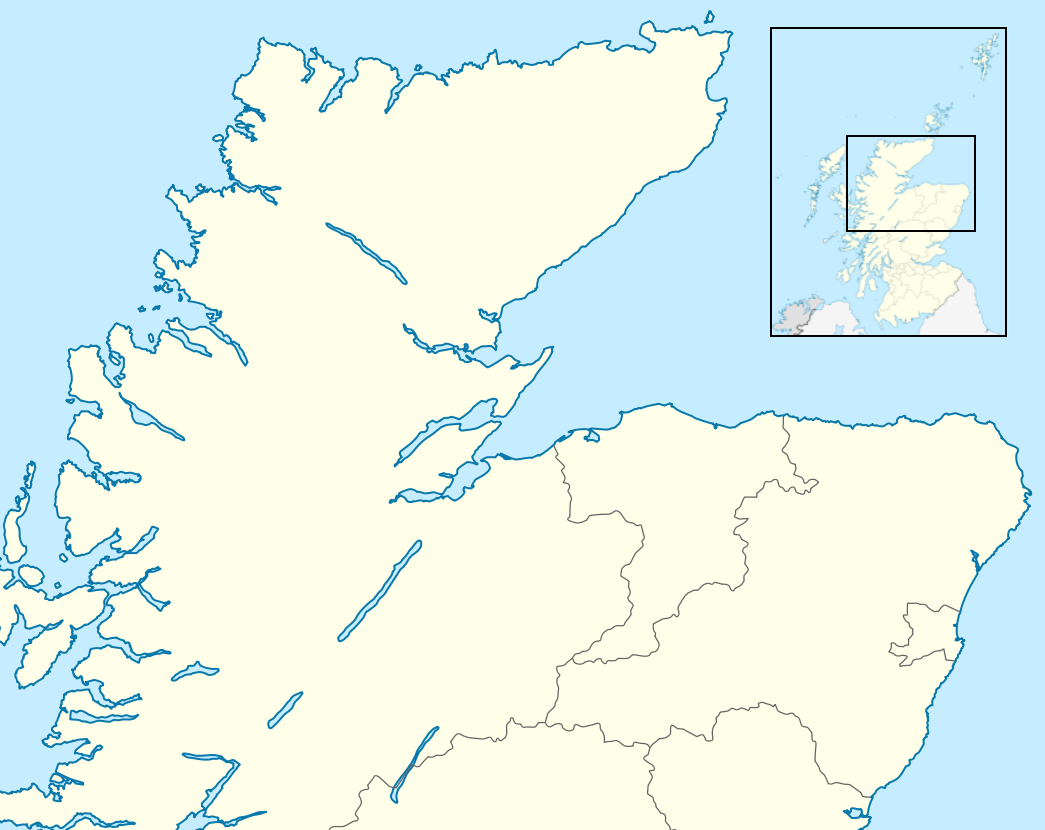
Location of teams in 2015–16 Highland Football League

== League table ==
Pos	Team	Pld	W	D	L	GF	GA	GD	Pts	Promotion or qualification
1	Cove Rangers (C)	34	29	2	3	98	28	+70	89	Qualification to League Two play-off semi-finals
2	Formartine United	34	27	4	3	137	35	+102	85	
3	Brora Rangers	34	27	4	3	128	35	+93	85	
4	Turriff United	34	20	8	6	88	31	+57	68	
5	Wick Academy	34	18	6	10	76	42	+34	60	
6	Inverurie Loco Works	34	18	4	12	71	43	+28	58	
7	Buckie Thistle	34	18	4	12	80	77	+3	58	
8	Nairn County	34	17	6	11	75	55	+20	57	
9	Fraserburgh	34	15	8	11	63	49	+14	53	
10	Keith	34	17	1	16	70	76	−6	52	
11	Forres Mechanics	34	15	4	15	60	65	−5	49	
12	Lossiemouth	34	12	2	20	46	70	−24	38	
13	Deveronvale	34	8	8	18	46	64	−18	32	
14	Clachnacuddin	34	10	2	22	59	80	−21	32	
15	Huntly	34	7	5	22	49	89	−40	26	
16	Strathspey Thistle	34	6	2	26	38	118	−80	20	
17	Fort William	34	5	1	28	38	116	−78	16	
18	Rothes	34	1	1	32	16	165	−149	4	

Source: BBC Sport
Rules for classification: 1) Points; 2) Goal difference; 3) Number of goals scored
(C) Champions

== Results ==
Home \ Away	BROR	BUCK	CLAC	COVE	DEVE	FORM	FORR	FORT	FRAS	HUNT	LOCO	KEITH	LOSS	NAIRN	ROTH	STRA	TURR	WICK
Brora Rangers		4–0	3–0	2–0	2–1	0–2	6–0	4–2	6–0	4–3	1–1	4–1	2–0	1–2	11–0	3–0	1–1	3–1
Buckie Thistle	1–8		3–2	0–5	1–1	1–2	2–6	6–2	2–2	4–3	0–1	4–1	0–2	1–6	5–0	7–1	1–0	3–0
Clachnacuddin	1–10	0–4		0–3	1–2	2–2	1–0	1–2	1–2	0–2	2–1	3–4	2–1	0–0	12–2	6–1	1–2	1–2
Cove Rangers	3–0	5–2	1–0		2–0	1–0	3–1	5–0	3–3	3–0	3–4	3–0	1–0	6–1	6–0	5–0	1–0	1–0
Deveronvale	0–2	0–2	6–1	1–3		1–8	0–3	4–1	2–2	0–0	1–4	0–4	2–2	1–4	3–0	2–1	1–1	1–2
Formartine United	3–3	10–3	5–1	0–1	4–1		1–0	6–1	1–0	5–1	4–0	4–3	5–1	5–1	9–0	6–1	0–0	2–1
Forres Mechanics	0–3	0–3	3–0	1–5	2–1	0–5		6–0	1–2	3–0	0–5	2–0	0–1	2–2	1–0	2–2	1–1	2–2
Fort William	3–5	1–3	1–2	0–4	2–1	1–4	0–3		1–4	0–2	0–4	1–6	2–2	0–3	3–1	1–2	0–1	1–3
Fraserburgh	1–2	1–2	4–1	4–2	0–1	1–1	1–2	2–1		6–0	0–1	0–3	1–2	1–0	7–0	4–0	0–1	0–4
Huntly	2–3	1–4	1–2	1–2	0–0	0–6	2–5	1–3	2–2		2–1	2–6	3–1	2–2	5–0	0–2	2–4	1–1
Inverurie Loco Works	0–1	1–0	2–3	1–2	2–2	4–3	4–0	4–1	1–1	3–1		2–4	0–2	1–1	6–0	3–0	1–2	0–2
Keith	2–6	1–0	1–0	1–5	2–0	2–3	3–4	1–0	1–2	1–5	0–4		4–2	0–2	3–2	3–2	0–0	0–1
Lossiemouth	0–3	0–1	2–0	1–3	1–0	2–8	0–2	2–1	1–2	2–0	0–1	1–2		1–5	3–1	4–1	0–4	0–2
Nairn County	1–7	1–2	4–3	1–2	3–2	0–1	3–1	5–2	1–1	1–0	1–0	1–2	4–1		2–1	3–1	1–2	3–3
Rothes	0–7	2–2	1–7	0–3	0–7	0–8	0–5	0–3	1–3	0–2	0–4	1–4	0–2	0–3		1–3	0–9	1–5
Strathspey Thistle	1–6	4–5	1–0	2–3	0–0	0–10	0–2	2–1	1–2	5–2	0–2	1–4	2–5	0–7	1–2		0–2	1–2
Turriff United	1–3	3–3	2–0	2–2	1–0	2–3	5–0	9–0	1–2	5–1	0–1	6–1	4–1	1–0	4–0	7–0		2–1
Wick Academy	2–2	1–3	0–3	0–1	1–2	0–1	2–0	8–1	0–0	3–0	4–2	3–0	2–1	2–1	7–0	6–0	3–3	

Source: highlandfootballleague.com
Legend: Blue = home team win; Yellow = draw; Red = away team win.

== Promotion play-offs ==
As Highland League champions, Cove Rangers played Edinburgh City, champions of the 2015–16 Lowland League, over two legs. Cove Rangers lost the first leg at home 0–3 and drew 1–1 away, losing 1–4 on aggregate. Therefore, Cove Rangers will remain in the Highland League for the 2016–17 season.
