= 2022–23 Dundee United F.C. season =

Dundee United
2022–23 season
- Chairman: Mark Ogren
- Manager: Jack Ross (Until 30 August); Liam Fox (from 23 September–26 February); Jim Goodwin (from 1 March)
- Stadium: Tannadice Park
- Scottish Premiership: 12th (relegated)
- Scottish Cup: Fifth round
- Scottish League Cup: Quarter-final
- Europa Conference League: Third qualifying round
- Top goalscorer: League: Steven Fletcher (9); All: Steven Fletcher (10)
- Highest home attendance: 12,599 vs. Rangers, Premiership, 8 January 2023
- Lowest home attendance: 4,973 vs. Kilmarnock, Scottish Cup, 11 February 2023
- Average home league attendance: 9,461
Home colours	Away colours	Third colours

The 2022–23 season was Dundee United's 114th season. It was their third season back in the Scottish Premiership, having been promoted from the Scottish Championship at the end of the 2019–20 season. The club also participated in the League Cup, Scottish Cup and UEFA Europa Conference League.

== Season summary ==
Dundee United finished the previous season in fourth place which allowed them to enter the third qualifying round of the Europa Conference League. United began the season under the management of Jack Ross who was appointed on a two-year deal following the departure of Tam Courts. Ross was sacked on 30 August after just seven matches, following his side's 9–0 loss to Celtic.

Following the dismissal of Ross, the club's assistant coach Liam Fox was given the reigns to take over, signing a two-year deal. However, after failing to improve the club's position in the league, Fox was also relieved of his duties as manager in February 2023 with sporting director Tong Ashgar also stepping down from his role at the club.

On 2 March, former Aberdeen manager Jim Goodwin was appointed as the club's new manager initially on a short-term deal until the end of the season.

Dundee United's relegation to the Scottish Championship was confirmed on the final day of the season following a defeat to Motherwell. Despite dropping to the second tier, Goodwin signed a new two-year deal to remain as manager in May 2023.

== Competitions ==
=== Results and fixtures ===
Win Draw Loss Postponed

=== Pre-season and friendlies ===
16 July 2022 Friendly	Dundee United	0–2	Sunderland	Dundee
15:00		Report	Hume 52'; Mulgrew 60' (o.g.)	Stadium: Tannadice Park

23 July 2022 Friendly	Fleetwood Town	2–1	Dundee United	Fleetwood, England
15:00	Batty 42'; Vela 88'	Report	Mulgrew 66'	Stadium: Highbury Stadium

=== Scottish Premiership ===
30 July 2022 1	Kilmarnock	1–1	Dundee United	Kilmarnock
15:00 BST	Taylor 90+1'	Report	Levitt 43'; Harkes (red card) 72'	Stadium: Rugby Park; Attendance: 8,014; Referee: William Collum

7 August 2022 2	Dundee United	0–1	Livingston	Dundee
15:00 BST		Report	Montaño 49'	Stadium: Tannadice Park; Attendance: 7,442; Referee: Steven McLean

14 August 2022 3	Heart of Midlothian	4–1	Dundee United	Edinburgh
15:00 BST	Shankland 1'; McKay 48'; Grant 62'; Ginnelly 90+5'	Report	Fletcher 71' (pen.)	Stadium: Tynecastle Park; Attendance: 18,856; Referee: Colin Steven

20 August 2022 4	Dundee United	0–3	St Mirren	Dundee
15:00 BST		Report	Main 40', 51'; Greive 90+1'	Stadium: Tannadice Park; Attendance: 7,540; Referee: Matthew MacDermid

28 August 2022 5	Dundee United	0–9	Celtic	Dundee
12:00 BST		Report	Furuhashi 15', 40', 45+2'; Jota 45+6'; Abada 50', 59', 77'; Juranović 55'; Starfelt 81'	Stadium: Tannadice Park; Attendance: 11,087; Referee: Steven McLean

3 September 2022 6	Motherwell	0–0	Dundee United	Motherwell
15:00 BST		Report		Stadium: Fir Park; Attendance: 5,783; Referee: Craig Napier

17 September 2022 7	Rangers	2–1	Dundee United	Glasgow
15:00 BST	Čolak 8', 49'	Report	Smith 59'	Stadium: Ibrox Stadium; Attendance: 49,334; Referee: Kevin Clancy

1 October 2022 8	Dundee United	1–2	St Johnstone	Dundee
12:00 BST	Watt 82'	Report	May 15'; Hallberg 39'	Stadium: Tannadice Park; Attendance: 7,977; Referee: David Munro

8 October 2022 9	Dundee United	4–0	Aberdeen	Dundee
18:00 BST	Behich 41'; Watt 45'; McGrath 73' (pen.); McCrorie 82' (o.g.)	Report		Stadium: Tannadice Park; Attendance: 11,010; Referee: William Collum

11 October 2022 10	Dundee United	1–0	Hibernian	Dundee
19:45 BST	Behich 11'	Report		Stadium: Tannadice Park; Attendance: 9,112; Referee: Euan Anderson

15 October 2022 11	Ross County	1–1	Dundee United	Dingwall
15:00 BST	Callachan 39'	Report	Watt 61'	Stadium: Victoria Park; Attendance: 3,744; Referee: Craig Napier

22 October 2022 12	St Mirren	2–1	Dundee United	Paisley
15:00 BST	Eriksson 41' (o.g.); Greive 83'	Report	Fletcher 58'	Stadium: St Mirren Park; Attendance: 6,273; Referee: Grant Irvine

29 October 2022 13	Dundee United	0–1	Motherwell	Dundee
15:00 BST	Watt (red card) 40'	Report	Johansen 22'	Stadium: Tannadice Park; Attendance: 7,581; Referee: John Beaton

5 November 2022 14	Celtic	4–2	Dundee United	Glasgow
15:00 BST	Hakšabanović 6', 34'; Furuhashi 90'; Abada 90+2'	Report	Fletcher 12' (pen.); Levitt 87'	Stadium: Celtic Park; Attendance: 58,696; Referee: David Dickinson

9 November 2022 15	Dundee United	4–0	Kilmarnock	Dundee
19:45 BST	Freeman 11'; McGrath 23'; Middleton 29'; Levitt 73'	Report		Stadium: Tannadice Park; Attendance: 7,430; Referee: Grant Irvine

12 November 2022 16	Aberdeen	1–0	Dundee United	Aberdeen
17:30 BST	Miovski 37' (pen.)	Report		Stadium: Pittodrie Stadium; Attendance: 17,035; Referee: William Collum

24 December 2022 17	Dundee United	2–2	Heart of Midlothian	Dundee
14:00 BST	Fletcher 20'; Levitt 47'	Report	Smith 41'; Shankland 90+4'	Stadium: Tannadice Park; Attendance: 10,224; Referee: Colin Steven

28 December 2022 18	Dundee United	3–0	Ross County	Dundee
19:45 BST	Randall 9' (o.g.); Mulgrew 70'; Sibbald 90+6'	Report	Edwards (red card) 85'	Stadium: Tannadice Park; Attendance: 8,249; Referee: Chris Graham

2 January 2023 19	St Johnstone	0–1	Dundee United	Perth
15:00 BST		Report	Watt 81'	Stadium: McDiarmid Park; Attendance: 7,116; Referee: Graham Grainger

8 January 2023 20	Dundee United	0–2	Rangers	Dundee
15:30 BST		Report	Sakala 54'; Tillman 57'	Stadium: Tannadice Park; Attendance: 12,599; Referee: Steven McLean

14 January 2023 21	Hibernian	2–2	Dundee United	Edinburgh
15:00 BST	Nisbet 25', 90+2'	Report	Middleton 6'; Harkes 30'	Stadium: Easter Road; Attendance: 18,676; Referee: Colin Steven

29 January 2023 22	Dundee United	0–2	Celtic	Dundee
16:00 BST		Report	Jota 51'; Mooy 56 pen.'	Stadium: Tannadice Park; Attendance: 12,448; Referee: Don Robertson

1 February 2023 23	Kilmarnock	1–0	Dundee United	Kilmarnock
19:45 BST	Armstrong 35'	Report		Stadium: Rugby Park; Attendance: 4,620; Referee: Matthew MacDermid

4 February 2023 24	Heart of Midlothian	3–1	Dundee United	Edinburgh
15:00 BST	Shankland 71'; Cochrane 77'; Ginnelly (red card) 90+6'; Humphrys 90+8'	Report	Fletcher 9'; Edwards (red card) 29'	Stadium: Tynecastle Park; Attendance: 18,279; Referee: Nick Walsh

18 February 2023 25	Dundee United	1–2	St Johnstone	Dundee
15:00 BST	Levitt 81'	Report	May 31', 82'	Stadium: Tannadice Park; Attendance: 9,796; Referee: Kevin Clancy

25 February 2023 26	Ross County	4–0	Dundee United	Dingwall
15:00 BST	Brophy 6', 70'; Dhanda 14'; White 62'	Report		Stadium: Victoria Park; Attendance: 4,922; Referee: Steven McLean

4 March 2023 27	Dundee United	1–3	Aberdeen	Dundee
18:00 BST	McGrath 73 pen.'	Report	Duk 56'; McCrorie 80'; Watkins 83'	Stadium: Tannadice Park; Attendance: 11,048; Referee: John Beaton

8 March 2023 28	Livingston	1–1	Dundee United	Livingston
15:00 BST	Bradley 13'	Report	Behich 59'	Stadium: Tony Macaroni Arena; Attendance: 2,115; Referee: Matthew MacDermid

18 March 2023 29	Dundee United	1–1	St Mirren	Dundee
15:00 BST	Fletcher 3'	Report	O'Hara 73 pen.'	Stadium: Tannadice Park; Attendance: 8,131; Referee: Craig Napier

1 April 2023 30	Rangers	2–0	Dundee United	Glasgow
15:00 BST	Tillman 38', 55'	Report		Stadium: Ibrox Stadium; Attendance: 49,969; Referee: Don Robertson

9 April 2023 31	Dundee United	2–1	Hibernian	Dundee
12:00 BST	Fletcher 8'; McGrath 90 pen.'	Report	Kukharevych 70'	Stadium: Tannadice Park; Attendance: 9,516; Referee: David Munro

15 April 2023 32	Motherwell	1–2	Dundee United	Motherwell
15:00 BST	van Veen 22'	Report	Niskanen 63'; McGrath 71' (pen.)	Stadium: Fir Park; Attendance: 6,391; Referee: Nick Walsh

22 April 2023 33	Dundee United	2–0	Livingston	Dundee
15:00 BST	McGrath 17'; Fletcher 85'	Report		Stadium: Tannadice Park; Attendance: 8,034; Referee: Kevin Clancy

6 May 2023 34	St Johnstone	1–0	Dundee United	Perth
15:00 BST	Gordon 43'	Report	Mulgrew (red card) 61'	Stadium: McDiarmid Park; Attendance: 7,071; Referee: Alan Muir

13 May 2023 35	Dundee United	1–3	Ross County	Dundee
15:00 BST	McGrath 24 pen.'	Report	White 1', 57', 72'	Stadium: Tannadice Park; Attendance: 10,138; Referee: John Beaton

20 May 2023 36	Livingston	2–1	Dundee United	Livingston
15:00 BST	Anderson 11'; Penrice 59'	Report	Harkes 21'; Behich (red card) 90+4'	Stadium: Tony Macaroni Arena; Attendance: 2,612; Referee: Don Robertson

24 May 2023 37	Dundee United	0–3	Kilmarnock	Dundee
19:45 BST		Report	Vassell 14', 44'; Cameron 83'	Stadium: Tannadice Park; Attendance: 10,406; Referee: Alan Muir

28 May 2023 38	Motherwell	3–2	Dundee United	Motherwell
15:00 BST	van Veen 5'; Spittal 69'; Johnston 82'	Report	McGrath 31 pen.' Fletcher 49'	Stadium: Fir Park; Attendance: 5,971; Referee: Steven McLean

=== Scottish League Cup ===
31 August 2022 Second round	Livingston	1–2	Dundee United	Livingston
19:45	Guthrie 78'	Report	Fletcher 15'; Harkes 34'	Stadium: Tony Macaroni Arena; Attendance: 1,497; Referee: David Munro

18 October 2022 Quarter-final	Kilmarnock	2–1	Dundee United	Kilmarnock
19:45	Lafferty 8 pen.' Armstrong 73'	Report	Middleton 10'	Stadium: Rugby Park; Attendance: 5,144; Referee: Kevin Clancy

=== Scottish Cup ===
21 January 2023 Fourth round	Dundee United	3–0	University of Stirling	Dundee
15:00	Behich 45'; McGrath 68'; Middleton 81'	Report		Stadium: Tannadice Park; Attendance: 4,993; Referee: Alan Muir

11 February 2023 Fifth round	Dundee United	0–1	Kilmarnock	Dundee
15:00	Ayina (red card) 78'	Report	Vassell 55'	Stadium: Tannadice Park; Attendance: 4,973; Referee: Alan Muir

=== UEFA Europa Conference League ===
==== Third qualifying round ====
4 August 2022 First leg	Dundee United (Scotland)	1–0	(Netherlands) AZ Alkmaar	Dundee
19:45 BST	Fletcher (yellow card) 33'; Sibbald (yellow card) 50'; Middleton 61'; Middleton (yellow card) 76'; Edwards (yellow card) 90+2'	Report	Hatzidiakos (yellow card) 25'; Beukema (yellow card) 59'	Stadium: Tannadice Park; Attendance: 10,181; Referee: Vitor Ferreira (Portugal)

11 August 2022 Second leg	AZ Alkmaar (Netherlands)	7–0 (7–1 agg.)	(Scotland) Dundee United	Alkmaar, Netherlands
19:45 BST	Pavlidis 21', 36'; Reijnders 31', 41'; Evjen 44' de Wit 46'; Lahdo 74'	Report		Stadium: AFAS Stadion; Attendance: 11,005; Referee: Antonio Mateu Lahoz (Spain)

== Player statistics ==
=== Appearances and goals ===
As of 28 May 2023

No.	Pos	Player	Premiership		League Cup		Scottish Cup		Conference League		Total	
No.	Pos	Player	Apps	Goals	Apps	Goals	Apps	Goals	Apps	Goals	Apps	Goals
1	GK	(Australia) Mark Birighitti	26+0	0	0+0	0	2+0	0	2+0	0	30	0
2	DF	(Scotland) Liam Smith	27+1	1	2+0	0	2+0	0	2+0	0	34	1
3	DF	(Scotland) Scott McMann	28+2	0	1+0	0	1+0	0	0+1	0	33	0
4	DF	(Scotland) Charlie Mulgrew	18+1	1	1+0	0	2+0	0	2+0	0	24	1
6	MF	(Scotland) Ross Graham	12+3	0	1+0	0	1+0	0	0+0	0	17	0
7	MF	(Finland) Ilmari Niskanen	8+12	1	0+0	0	0+1	0	0+2	0	23	1
8	MF	(Scotland) Peter Pawlett	5+7	0	0+0	0	0+1	0	0+0	0	13	0
9	FW	(Scotland) Steven Fletcher	30+3	9	1+1	1	2+0	0	2+0	0	39	10
10	MF	(Cameroon) Arnaud Djoum	8+8	0	1+0	0	0+0	0	0+0	0	17	0
12	DF	(England) Ryan Edwards	26+3	0	2+0	0	0+0	0	2+0	0	33	0
14	MF	(Scotland) Craig Sibbald	29+6	1	0+2	0	2+0	0	2+0	0	41	1
15	MF	(Scotland) Glenn Middleton	19+8	2	1+1	1	1+1	1	1+1	1	33	5
16	DF	(Australia) Aziz Behich	31+0	3	2+0	0	1+1	1	1+0	0	36	4
18	MF	(Republic of Ireland) Jamie McGrath	29+3	8	2+0	0	1+0	1	1+1	0	37	9
19	MF	(Wales) Dylan Levitt	24+3	5	2+0	0	2+0	0	2+0	0	33	5
20	FW	(Uganda) Sadat Anaku	2+11	0	0+1	0	0+1	0	0+0	0	15	0
22	DF	(Scotland) Kieran Freeman	22+2	1	1+0	0	1+0	0	1+0	0	27	1
23	MF	(United States) Ian Harkes	25+4	2	1+0	1	0+1	0	2+0	0	33	3
25	FW	(Scotland) Kai Fotheringham	3+8	0	0+0	0	0+0	0	0+0	0	11	0
27	DF	(Republic of the Congo) Loick Ayina	12+0	0	0+0	0	1+0	0	0+0	0	13	0
28	MF	(Ghana) Mathew Cudjoe	2+10	0	0+1	0	1+1	0	0+1	0	16	0
31	GK	(Scotland) Jack Newman	3+1	0	0+0	0	0+0	0	0+0	0	4	0
39	MF	(Scotland) Miller Thomson	0+3	0	0+0	0	0+0	0	0+0	0	3	0
43	MF	(Scotland) Craig Moore	0+0	0	0+0	0	0+0	0	0+0	0	0	0
44	FW	(Scotland) Rory MacLeod	2+13	0	0+0	0	1+1	0	0+0	0	17	0
Players who left the club during the 2022–23 season
10	FW	(Scotland) Nicky Clark	0+3	0	0+0	0	0+0	0	0+1	0	4	0
11	MF	(Scotland) Logan Chalmers	0+0	0	0+0	0	0+0	0	0+0	0	0	0
13	GK	(Finland) Carljohan Eriksson	9+0	0	1+0	0	0+0	0	0+0	0	10	0
17	MF	(Scotland) Archie Meekison	1+6	0	0+0	0	0+0	0	0+1	0	8	0
21	MF	(Scotland) Declan Glass	0+0	0	0+0	0	0+0	0	0+0	0	0	0
26	MF	(Scotland) Chris Mochrie	0+0	0	0+0	0	0+0	0	0+0	0	0	0
30	FW	(Scotland) Darren Watson	0+0	0	0+0	0	0+0	0	0+0	0	0	0
32	FW	(Scotland) Tony Watt	12+5	4	2+0	0	0+0	0	2+0	0	21	4
33	DF	(Scotland) Flynn Duffy	0+0	0	0+0	0	0+0	0	0+0	0	0	0
35	MF	(Scotland) Finn Robson	0+0	0	0+0	0	0+0	0	0+0	0	0	0
37	DF	(Scotland) Adam Hutchinson	0+0	0	0+0	0	0+0	0	0+0	0	0	0
38	DF	(Scotland) Layton Bisland	0+0	0	0+0	0	0+0	0	0+0	0	0	0
41	GK	(Scotland) Ruairidh Adams	0+0	0	0+0	0	0+0	0	0+0	0	0	0

== Team statistics ==
=== League table ===
Pos	Team	Pld	W	D	L	GF	GA	GD	Pts	Qualification or relegation (Note: Teams play each other three times (33 matches), before the league is split into two groups (the top six and the bottom six).)
8	Livingston	38	13	7	18	36	60	−24	46	
9	St Johnstone	38	12	7	19	41	59	−18	43	
10	Kilmarnock	38	11	7	20	37	62	−25	40	
11	Ross County (O)	38	9	7	22	37	60	−23	34	Qualification for the Premiership play-off final
12	Dundee United (R)	38	8	7	23	40	70	−30	31	Relegation to Championship

Rules for classification: 1) Points; 2) Goal difference; 3) Goals scored; 4) Head-to-Head points; 5) Head-to-Head goal difference; 6) Play-off (only if deciding champion, UEFA competitions qualification, second stage group allocation or relegation).
(O) Play-off winners; (R) Relegated

== Transfers ==
=== Players in ===
Player	From	Fee
(Scotland) Steven Fletcher	(England) Stoke City	Free
(Wales) Dylan Levitt	(England) Manchester United	Undisclosed
(Scotland) Craig Sibbald	(Scotland) Livingston	Free
(Australia) Mark Birighitti	(Australia) Central Coast Mariners	Undisclosed
(Australia) Aziz Behich	(Turkey) Giresunspor	Free
(Scotland) Glenn Middleton	(Scotland) Rangers	Undisclosed
(Uganda) Sadat Anaku	(Uganda) Kampala CC	Free
(Cameroon) Arnaud Djoum	(Cyprus) Apollon Limassol	Free

=== Players out ===
Player	To	Fee
(France) Maxime Biamou	Free Agent	Free
(Kosovo) Florent Hoti	(Scotland) Arbroath	Free
(Scotland) Kevin McDonald	Free Agent	Free
(Argentina) Adrián Spörle	Free Agent	Free
(Northern Ireland) Trevor Carson	(Scotland) St Mirren	Undisclosed
(Scotland) Lewis Neilson	(Scotland) Heart of Midlothian	Free
(Switzerland) Benjamin Siegrist	(Scotland) Celtic	Free
(England) Calum Butcher	(England) Burton Albion	Free
(Scotland) Lennon Walker	(Scotland) Falkirk	Free
(Republic of Ireland) Mark Connolly	(Republic of Ireland) Derry City	Undisclosed
(Scotland) Nicky Clark	(Scotland) St Johnstone	Undisclosed

=== Loans in ===
Player	From	Fee
(Republic of Ireland) Jamie McGrath	(England) Wigan Athletic	Loan
(Republic of the Congo) Loick Ayina	(England) Huddersfield Town	Loan

=== Loans out ===
Player	To	Fee
(Scotland) Finn Robson	(Scotland) Kelty Hearts	Loan
(Scotland) Jack Newman	(Scotland) Peterhead	Loan
(Scotland) Declan Glass	(Republic of Ireland) Derry City	Loan
(Scotland) Chris Mochrie	(Scotland) Dunfermline Athletic	Loan
(Scotland) Adam Hutchinson	(Scotland) Montrose	Loan
(Scotland) Layton Bisland	(Scotland) Cowdenbeath	Loan
(Scotland) Kai Fotheringham	(Scotland) Stirling Albion	Loan
(Scotland) Logan Chalmers	(Scotland) Ayr United	Loan
(Scotland) Declan Glass	(Scotland) Cove Rangers	Loan
(Scotland) Flynn Duffy	(Scotland) Stirling Albion	Loan
(Scotland) Adam Hutchinson	(Scotland) Forfar Athletic	Loan
(Scotland) Jacob Comerford	(Scotland) Cumbernauld Colts	Loan
(Scotland) Finn Robson	(Scotland) Forfar Athletic	Loan
(Scotland) Ruairidh Adams	(Scotland) Gala Fairydean Rovers	Loan
(Scotland) Layton Bisland	(Scotland) Peterhead	Loan
(Scotland) Logan Chalmers	(England) Tranmere Rovers	Loan
(Scotland) Darren Watson	(Scotland) Forfar Athletic	Loan
(Finland) Carljohan Eriksson	(Denmark) Nordsjælland	Loan
(Scotland) Archie Meekison	(Scotland) Falkirk	Loan
(Scotland) Tony Watt	(Scotland) St Mirren	Loan
