= 2023–24 Dundee United F.C. season =

Dundee United
2023–24 season
- Chairman: Mark Ogren
- Manager: Jim Goodwin
- Stadium: Tannadice Park
- Scottish Championship: 1st (promoted)
- Scottish Cup: Third round
- Scottish League Cup: Group stage
- Scottish Challenge Cup: Quarter-final
- Top goalscorer: League: Louis Moult (18); All: Louis Moult (20)
- Highest home attendance: 11,802, vs. Partick Thistle, Championship, 3 May 2024
- Lowest home attendance: 2,103, vs. Peterhead, League Cup, 22 July 2023
- Average home league attendance: 8,408
Home colours	Away colours

The 2023–24 season was Dundee United's 115th season. It was their first season back in the Scottish Championship, having been relegated from the Scottish Premiership at the end of the 2022–23 season. The club also participated in the Scottish Cup, League Cup, and Challenge Cup.

== Season summary ==
On 2 March 2023, former Aberdeen manager Jim Goodwin was appointed as the club's new manager initially on a short-term deal until the end of the season.

Dundee United's relegation to the Scottish Championship was confirmed on the final day of the season following a defeat to Motherwell. Despite dropping to the second tier, Jim Goodwin signed a new two-year deal to remain as the club's manager in May 2023.

== Competitions ==
=== Results and fixtures ===
Win Draw Loss Postponed

=== Pre-season and friendlies ===
29 July 2023 Friendly	Carlisle United	0–2	Dundee United	Carlisle
15:00		Report	Moult 32'; Middleton 44'	Stadium: Brunton Park; Attendance: 2,853; Referee: Anthony Backhouse

=== Scottish Championship ===
4 August 2023 1	Arbroath	0–4	Dundee United	Arbroath
19:45		Report	Middleton 11'; Cudjoe 25'; Sibbald 37'; Moult 45+1'	Stadium: Gayfield Park; Attendance: 5,558; Referee: Don Robertson

12 August 2023 2	Dundee United	1–1	Dunfermline Athletic	Dundee
15:00	Cudjoe 90+5'	Report	Wighton 61'	Stadium: Tannadice Park; Attendance: 8,892; Referee: Euan Anderson

26 August 2023 3	Ayr United	0–3	Dundee United	Ayr
15:00			Holt 58', 90'; Moult 62'	Stadium: Somerset Park; Attendance: 3,103; Referee: Nick Walsh

2 September 2023 4	Dundee United	2–0	Airdrieonians	Dundee
15:00	Cudjoe 4'; Fotheringham 90+4'	Report		Stadium: Tannadice Park; Attendance: 8,008; Referee: Chris Graham

16 September 2023 5	Dundee United	1–1	Greenock Morton	Dundee
15:00	Moult 19'; Cudjoe (red card) 63'	Report	Muirhead 58'	Stadium: Tannadice Park; Attendance: 7,075; Referee: David Munro

23 September 2023 6	Inverness CT	0–1	Dundee United	Inverness
15:00		Report	Tillson (red card) 69'; Mochrie 90+3'	Stadium: Caledonian Stadium; Attendance: 3,503; Referee: Calum Scott

30 September 2023 7	Dundee United	4–1	Queen's Park	Dundee
15:00	Watt 37', 61'; McMann 56'; Fotheringham 67'	Report	Thomson 1'	Stadium: Tannadice Park; Attendance: 7,256; Referee: Steven Kirkland

7 October 2023 8	Raith Rovers	1–1	Dundee United	Kirkcaldy
15:00	Vaughan 24'	Report	Moult 67'	Stadium: Stark's Park; Attendance: 6,808; Referee: Alan Muir

21 October 2023 9	Partick Thistle	0–5	Dundee United	Glasgow
15:00	Muirhead (red card) 80'	Report	Sibbald 12'; Holt 61', 83', 88 pen.' McMann 63'	Stadium: Firhill Stadium; Attendance: 5,120; Referee: Steven Kirkland

27 October 2023 10	Dundee United	6–0	Arbroath	Dundee
19:45	Moult 7', 61'; Docherty 14'; Fotheringham 43'; Watt 57'; Cudjoe 87'	Report		Stadium: Tannadice Park; Attendance: 8,489; Referee: Colin Steven

31 October 2023 11	Airdrieonians	0–2	Dundee United	Airdrie
19:45		Report	Fotheringham 20', 52'	Stadium: Excelsior Stadium; Attendance: 2,402; Referee: Euan Anderson

4 November 2023 12	Dundee United	1–1	Inverness CT	Dundee
15:00	Holt 56'	Report	Shaw 50'	Stadium: Tannadice Park; Attendance: 7,602; Referee: Don Robertson

10 November 2023 13	Dunfermline Athletic	1–2	Dundee United	Dunfermline
19:45	Moffat 53'	Report	Fotheringham 37'; Mochrie 85'	Stadium: East End Park; Attendance: 7,237; Referee: Chris Graham

9 December 2023 15	Dundee United	1–0	Ayr United	Dundee
15:00	Fotheringham 37'			Stadium: Tannadice Park; Attendance: 7,000; Referee: Nick Walsh

16 December 2023 16	Dundee United	0–1	Raith Rovers	Dundee
15:00		Report	Easton 59'	Stadium: Tannadice Park; Attendance: 10,334; Referee: John Beaton

22 December 2023 17	Queen's Park	0–0	Dundee United	Glasgow
19:45		Report		Stadium: Hampden Park; Attendance: 2,536; Referee: Steven McLean

29 December 2023 18	Dundee United	3–0	Partick Thistle	Dundee
19:45	Watt 7', 86', 89'	Report		Stadium: Tannadice Park; Attendance: 8,110; Referee: Matthew MacDermid

2 January 2024 19	Arbroath	0–3	Dundee United	Arbroath
15:00		Report	Moult 38', 53'; Middleton 48'	Stadium: Gayfield Park; Attendance: 5,276; Referee: Colin Steven

6 January 2024 20	Dundee United	2–3	Greenock Morton	Dundee
15:00	Fotheringham 38'; Moult 45'; Sibbald (red card) 88'	Report	Oakley 25', 36', 88'	Stadium: Tannadice Park; Attendance: 7,706; Referee: Iain Snedden

12 January 2024 21	Inverness CT	0–1	Dundee United	Inverness
19:45		Report	Watt 87'	Stadium: Caledonian Stadium; Attendance: 2,662; Referee: Alan Muir

27 January 2024 22	Dundee United	0–0	Dunfermline Athletic	Dundee
15:00		Report		Stadium: Tannadice Park; Attendance: 8,260; Referee: Graham Grainger

3 February 2024 23	Ayr United	1–2	Dundee United	Ayr
15:00	Murphy 2'; Stanger (red card) 90+1'	Report	Watt 67'; Docherty 82'	Stadium: Somerset Park; Attendance: 2,943; Referee: Gavin Duncan

16 February 2024 24	Raith Rovers	2–1	Dundee United	Kirkcaldy
19:45	Rudden 9'; Brown 89'	Report	Moult 39'	Stadium: Stark's Park; Attendance: 7,923; Referee: Don Robertson

24 February 2024 25	Dundee United	3–1	Queen's Park	Dundee
15:00	Moult 37'; Tillson 44'; Middleton 81'	Report	Paton 23'	Stadium: Tannadice Park; Attendance: 7,341; Referee: Ross Hardie

27 February 2024 26	Dundee United	0–2	Airdrieonians	Dundee
19:45		Report	McGill 59'; O'Connor 90+4'	Stadium: Tannadice Park; Attendance: 7,867; Referee: Grant Irvine

2 March 2024 27	Partick Thistle	1–1	Dundee United	Glasgow
19:45	Graham 3'	Report	Moult 67'	Stadium: Firhill Stadium; Attendance: 4,448; Referee: Matthew MacDermid

5 March 2023 14	Greenock Morton	0–1	Dundee United	Greenock
15:00		Report	Moult 26'	Stadium: Cappielow; Attendance: 2,115; Referee: Lloyd Wilson
Note: Match postponed due to a frozen pitch.

9 March 2024 28	Dundee United	4–0	Arbroath	Dundee
15:00	Fotheringham 7'; Watt 14', 59'; Greive 62'	Report	Robinson (red card) 84'	Stadium: Tannadice Park; Attendance: 7,676; Referee: Alan Muir

15 March 2023 29	Dunfermline Athletic	3–1	Dundee United	Dunfermline
19:45	Todd 10'; Ritchie-Hosler 37', 53'	Report	Benedictus 80 o.g.'	Stadium: East End Park; Attendance: 6,368; Referee: Colin Steven

23 March 2024 30	Dundee United	1–1	Inverness CT	Dundee
15:00	Moult 55'	Report	Duffy 12'	Stadium: Tannadice Park; Attendance: 7,567; Referee: Chris Graham

30 March 2024 31	Dundee United	2–0	Raith Rovers	Dundee
15:00	Watt 7'; Moult 75 pen.'	Report		Stadium: Tannadice Park; Attendance: 10,336; Referee: Nick Walsh

6 April 2023 32	Queen's Park	0–5	Dundee United	Glasgow
15:00		Report	Fotheringham 45', 64'; Moult 55'; Graham 59'; Sibbald 70'	Stadium: Hampden Park; Attendance: 3,109; Referee: Duncan Williams

12 April 2023 33	Greenock Morton	1–4	Dundee United	Greenock
19:45	Muirhead 62'	Report	Docherty 20'; Middleton 23'; Moult 51'; Watt 58'	Stadium: Cappielow; Attendance: 2,423; Referee: Graham Grainger

20 April 2024 34	Dundee United	1–0	Ayr United	Dundee
15:00	Mochrie 78'	Report	McAllister (red card) 59'	Stadium: Tannadice Park; Attendance: 10,025; Referee: Craig Napier

26 April 2023 35	Airdrieonians	0–0	Dundee United	Airdrie
19:45		Report		Stadium: Excelsior Stadium; Attendance: 3,192; Referee: David Dickinson

3 May 2024 36	Dundee United	4–1	Partick Thistle	Dundee
19:45	Sibbald 42'; Fotheringham 59'; Watt 69'; Moult 83 pen.'	Report	Stanway 13'	Stadium: Tannadice Park; Attendance: 11,802; Referee: Steven McLean

=== Scottish League Cup ===
==== Group stage ====
15 July 2023 1	The Spartans	1–0	Dundee United	Edinburgh
15:00	Henderson 11'	Report		Stadium: Ainslie Park; Attendance: 1,701; Referee: Stewart Luke

18 July 2023 2	Dundee United	1–2	Partick Thistle	Dundee
19:45	Sibbald 18'	Report	Graham 32'; Milne 58'	Stadium: Tannadice Park; Attendance: 3,147; Referee: Matthew MacDermid

22 July 2023 3	Dundee United	3–0	Peterhead	Dundee
15:00	Moult 22'; Holt 76 pen.', 79 pen.'	Report	Strachan (red card) 78'	Stadium: Tannadice Park; Attendance: 2,103; Referee: Calum Scott

25 July 2023 4	Falkirk	0–1	Dundee United	Falkirk
19:45		Report	Fotheringham 28'	Stadium: Falkirk Stadium; Attendance: 3,186; Referee: David Munro

=== Scottish Challenge Cup ===
9 September 2023 Third round	Dundee United	3–0	Dunfermline Athletic	Dundee
15:00	Moult 18'; Comrie 34 o.g.' Glass 37'	Report		Stadium: Tannadice Park; Attendance: 2,408; Referee: Craig Napier

14 October 2023 Fourth round	Peterhead	0–2	Dundee United	Peterhead
17:30		Report	Middleton 7'; Watt 71'	Stadium: Balmoor Stadium; Attendance: 1,322; Referee: Calum Scott

17 November 2023 Quarter-final	Falkirk	4–2	Dundee United	Falkirk
19:40	Morrison 4', 71'; Lang 65'; Yeats 69'	Report	Cudjoe 23'; Watt 33'	Stadium: Falkirk Stadium; Attendance: 2,891; Referee: Grant Irvine

=== Scottish Cup ===
25 November 2023 Third round	Queen of the South	2–2 (a.e.t.) (4–3 p)	Dundee United	Dumfries
15:00	Reilly 17'; Connelly 50'	Report	Fotheringham 6', 58'	Stadium: Palmerston Park; Attendance: 1,603; Referee: Chris Graham

== Player statistics ==
=== Appearances and goals ===
As of 3 May 2024

No.	Pos	Player	Championship		League Cup		Challenge Cup		Scottish Cup		Total	
No.	Pos	Player	Apps	Goals	Apps	Goals	Apps	Goals	Apps	Goals	Apps	Goals
1	GK	(England) Jack Walton	36+0	0	4+0	0	3+0	0	1+0	0	44	0
4	DF	(Scotland) Kevin Holt	30+1	6	4+0	2	2+0	0	1+0	0	38	8
5	DF	(Northern Ireland) Sam McClelland	6+0	0	0+0	0	0+0	0	0+0	0	6	0
6	DF	(Scotland) Ross Graham	11+7	1	2+1	0	3+0	0	0+0	0	24	1
7	FW	(New Zealand) Alex Greive	6+7	1	0+0	0	0+0	0	0+0	0	13	1
8	MF	(England) Liam Grimshaw	25+7	0	2+1	0	2+1	0	1+0	0	39	0
9	FW	(England) Louis Moult	28+5	18	1+1	1	2+1	1	1+0	0	39	20
10	MF	(Canada) David Wotherspoon	5+4	0	0+0	0	0+0	0	0+0	0	9	0
13	GK	(Scotland) Jack Newman	0+0	0	0+0	0	0+0	0	0+0	0	0	0
14	MF	(Scotland) Craig Sibbald	32+1	4	2+1	1	1+1	0	1+0	0	39	5
15	MF	(Scotland) Glenn Middleton	32+3	4	2+2	0	3+0	1	1+0	0	43	5
16	MF	(England) Jordan Tillson	13+14	1	0+0	0	1+2	0	0+1	0	31	1
17	MF	(Scotland) Archie Meekison	2+10	0	3+1	0	0+0	0	0+0	0	16	0
18	FW	(Scotland) Kai Fotheringham	24+11	12	2+1	1	1+1	0	1+0	2	41	15
20	FW	(Uganda) Sadat Anaku	0+0	0	0+0	0	0+0	0	0+0	0	0	0
21	MF	(Scotland) Declan Glass	7+10	0	1+3	0	2+1	1	1+0	0	25	1
23	MF	(Scotland) Ross Docherty	20+0	3	4+0	0	1+0	0	1+0	0	26	3
26	MF	(Scotland) Chris Mochrie	5+19	3	1+2	0	2+0	0	0+1	0	30	3
27	FW	(Scotland) Rory MacLeod	0+4	0	0+3	0	0+0	0	0+0	0	7	0
28	MF	(Ghana) Mathew Cudjoe	7+15	4	3+1	0	1+1	1	0+1	0	29	5
29	MF	(Scotland) Miller Thomson	11+4	0	0+1	0	0+0	0	0+0	0	16	0
31	DF	(Scotland) Declan Gallagher	25+1	0	0+0	0	1+0	0	1+0	0	28	0
32	FW	(Scotland) Tony Watt	31+5	13	4+0	0	3+0	2	0+0	0	43	15
33	DF	(Scotland) Scott McMann	35+0	2	4+0	0	3+0	0	1+0	0	43	2
36	MF	(Scotland) Bryan Mwangi	0+0	0	0+0	0	0+0	0	0+0	0	0	0
48	DF	(Scotland) Adam Carnwath	0+0	0	0+0	0	0+1	0	0+0	0	1	0
50	MF	(Scotland) Scott Constable	0+1	0	0+0	0	0+1	0	0+0	0	2	0
53	FW	(Scotland) Owen Stirton	0+1	0	0+0	0	0+3	0	0+1	0	5	0
Players who left the club during the 2023–24 season
5	DF	(Wales) Oliver Denham	0+0	0	2+0	0	0+0	0	0+0	0	2	0
7	MF	(Finland) Ilmari Niskanen	0+0	0	0+1	0	0+0	0	0+0	0	1	0
11	FW	(Scotland) Logan Chalmers	0+0	0	0+1	0	0+0	0	0+0	0	1	0
22	DF	(Scotland) Kieran Freeman	3+0	0	3+0	0	1+0	0	0+0	0	7	0
25	DF	(Scotland) Flynn Duffy	0+0	0	0+0	0	0+1	0	0+0	0	1	0
30	MF	(Scotland) Lewis O'Donnell	0+0	0	0+0	0	0+0	0	0+0	0	0	0
34	DF	(Scotland) Layton Bisland	0+0	0	0+0	0	0+0	0	0+0	0	0	0
35	MF	(Scotland) Craig Moore	0+0	0	0+0	0	0+0	0	0+0	0	0	0
41	GK	(Scotland) Ruairidh Adams	0+0	0	0+0	0	0+0	0	0+0	0	0	0

== Team statistics ==
=== League table ===
Pos	Team	Pld	W	D	L	GF	GA	GD	Pts	Promotion, qualification or relegation
1	Dundee United (C, P)	36	22	9	5	73	23	+50	75	Promotion to the Premiership
2	Raith Rovers	36	20	9	7	58	42	+16	69	Qualification for the Premiership play-off semi-final
3	Partick Thistle	36	14	13	9	63	54	+9	55	Qualification for the Premiership play-off quarter-final
4	Airdrieonians	36	15	7	14	44	44	0	52	Qualification for the Premiership play-off quarter-final
5	Greenock Morton	36	12	9	15	43	46	−3	45	

Rules for classification: 1) Points; 2) Goal difference; 3) Goals scored; 4) Head-to-to head points; 5) Head-to-head goal difference; 6) Play-off (only for deciding promotion, play-off participation and relegation).
(C) Champions; (P) Promoted

=== League cup table ===
Pos	Team	Pld	W	PW	PL	L	GF	GA	GD	Pts	Qualification	PAR	FAL	DUN	SPA	PET
1	Partick Thistle	4	2	1	1	0	7	5	+2	9	Qualification for the second round	—	2–2p	—	2–1	—
2	Falkirk	4	2	1	0	1	8	5	+3	8		—	—	0–1	—	4–1
3	Dundee United	4	2	0	0	2	5	3	+2	6		1–2	—	—	—	3–0
4	The Spartans	4	2	0	0	2	5	5	0	6		—	1–2	1–0	—	—
5	Peterhead	4	0	0	1	3	3	10	−7	1		1–1p	—	—	1–2	—

Rules for classification: 1) goal difference, 2) goals scored, 3) away goals scored, 4) matches won, 5) away matches won, 6) drawing of lots.

== Transfers ==
=== Players in ===
Player	From	Fee
(Scotland) Ross Docherty	(Scotland) Partick Thistle	Free
(England) Liam Grimshaw	(Scotland) Greenock Morton	Free
(Scotland) Kevin Holt	(Scotland) Partick Thistle	Free
(England) Louis Moult	(England) Burton Albion	Free
(Scotland) Declan Gallagher	(Scotland) St Mirren	Undisclosed
(Canada) David Wotherspoon	(Scotland) Inverness CT	Free

=== Players out ===
Player	To	Fee
(England) Ryan Edwards	(India) Chennaiyin	Free
(United States) Ian Harkes	(United States) New England Revolution	Free
(Scotland) Peter Pawlett	(Scotland) Peterhead	Free
(Scotland) Liam Smith	(England) Cheltenham Town	Free
(Finland) Carljohan Eriksson	(Denmark) Nordsjælland	Undisclosed
(Scotland) Adam Hutchinson	(Scotland) Forfar Athletic	Free
(Scotland) Darren Watson	(Scotland) Forfar Athletic	Free
(Cameroon) Arnaud Djoum	Free agent	Free
(Scotland) Steven Fletcher	(Wales) Wrexham	Free
(Wales) Dylan Levitt	(Scotland) Hibernian	£300,000
(Scotland) Finn Robson	(Scotland) Forfar Athletic	Free
(Scotland) Charlie Mulgrew	Retired	
(Australia) Aziz Behich	(Australia) Melbourne City	Undisclosed
(Finland) Ilmari Niskanen	(England) Exeter City	Undisclosed
(Scotland) Kieran Freeman	(Republic of Ireland) St Patrick's Athletic	Free

=== Loans in ===
Player	From	Fee
(England) Jack Walton	(England) Luton Town	Loan
(Wales) Oliver Denham	(Wales) Cardiff City	Loan
(England) Jordan Tillson	(Scotland) Ross County	Loan
(New Zealand) Alex Greive	(Scotland) St Mirren	Loan
(Northern Ireland) Sam McClelland	(Scotland) St Johnstone	Loan

=== Loans out ===
Player	To	Fee
(Scotland) Lewis O'Donnell	(Scotland) Kelty Hearts	Loan
(Scotland) Miller Thomson	(Scotland) Montrose	Loan
(Scotland) Logan Chalmers	(Scotland) Ayr United	Loan
(Scotland) Layton Bisland	(Scotland) Falkirk	Loan
(Scotland) Rory MacLeod	(Scotland) Forfar Athletic	Loan
(Scotland) Bryan Mwangi	(Scotland) The Spartans	Loan
(Scotland) Craig Moore	(Scotland) Brechin City	Loan
(Scotland) Ruairidh Adams	(Scotland) Edinburgh City	Loan
(Scotland) Flynn Duffy	(Scotland) Peterhead	Loan
(Australia) Mark Birighitti	(Scotland) Kilmarnock	Loan
(Scotland) Craig Moore	(Scotland) Lochee United	Loan
