= Callum Moore =

Callum Moore is the name of:

- Callum Moore (Australian footballer), AFL player for Richmond
- Callum Moore (Scottish footballer), association football player for Dundee
