= Glenn Middleton =

Scottish footballer (born 2000)

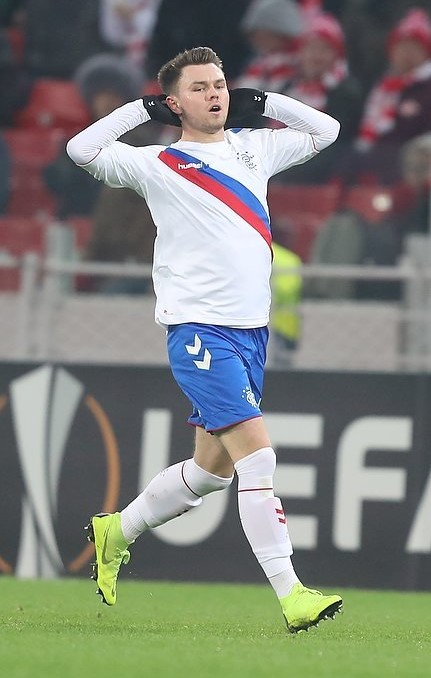
- Middleton playing for Rangers in 2018

Personal information
- Full name: Glenn Bell Dollar Middleton
- Date of birth: 1 January 2000 (age 26)
- Place of birth: Glasgow, Scotland
- Height: 5 ft 9 in (1.75 m)
- Position: Winger

Team information
- Current team: Rochdale
- Number: 45

Youth career
- Northampton Town
- 2012–2017: Norwich City

Senior career*
Years	Team	Apps	(Gls)
2017–2018	Norwich City	0	(0)
2018–2022	Rangers	15	(2)
2019	→ Hibernian (loan)	6	(0)
2020	→ Bradford City (loan)	3	(0)
2021	→ St Johnstone (loan)	9	(2)
2021–2022	→ St Johnstone (loan)	28	(1)
2022–2025	Dundee United	94	(8)
2025–2026	Doncaster Rovers	35	(1)
2026–	Rochdale	0	(0)

International career^{‡}
2014	Scotland U16	1	(0)
2014–2017	Scotland U17	14	(0)
2017–2018	Scotland U19	18	(4)
2018–2021	Scotland U21	22	(5)
- * Club domestic league appearances and goals as of 14 December 2025 (UTC) ‡ National team caps and goals as of 22:35, 29 March 2022 (UTC)

Glenn Bell Dollar Middleton (born 1 January 2000) is a Scottish professional footballer who plays as a winger for EFL League Two club Rochdale.

He made 22 appearances for the Scotland under-21 team.

== Early life ==
Born in Glasgow, Middleton was a keen supporter of Rangers as a child. His family relocated to the Northampton area in 2006, and he spent some time developing in the youth teams at Northampton Town.

== Club career ==
=== Norwich City ===
Middleton joined Norwich City's Academy in 2012, graduating through their youth system. He was given the squad number 43 for the first team during the 2017–18 season and was also named in the squad as a substitute in a FA Cup 3rd round match against Southampton on 18 January 2017.

=== Rangers ===
Having found his senior opportunities limited at Norwich City, Middleton joined Rangers on 31 January 2018, reuniting with former Canaries youth coach Graeme Murty who was the Gers manager at the time of his arrival.

==== 2018–19 ====
Under Murty's successor Steven Gerrard, Middleton made his competitive debut for Rangers in a 2–0 win for Rangers against FK Shkupi in the Europa League on 12 July 2018 at Ibrox Stadium, with Middleton being widely praised for his performance on his debut. He scored his first goal for Rangers when he came on as a substitute in a 4–0 win against Dundee two months later. On 26 October, Middleton signed a five-year contract with Rangers that tied him to the club until the summer of 2023.

==== 2019–20: Loans to Hibernian and Bradford ====
Middleton was loaned to Hibernian in August 2019. He made eight appearances for Hibernian, but none after 30 October, and the loan was curtailed on 27 December. He was then loaned to Bradford City on 31 January 2020 for the rest of the season.

==== 2021–2022: Loans at St Johnstone ====
On 25 January 2021, Middleton joined St Johnstone on loan for the remainder of the season. He was cup-tied and missed out on their victory in the 2020–21 Scottish League Cup, but then featured as the Saints also won the 2020–21 Scottish Cup. He returned on loan to McDiarmid Park in August 2021 and remained there for the whole season.

=== Dundee United ===
In July 2022, Middleton joined Dundee United from Rangers for an undisclosed transfer fee, on a three-year contract.

=== Doncaster Rovers ===
On 3 June 2025, it was announced that Middleton would join newly-promoted EFL League One club Doncaster Rovers on 1 July 2025, after his Dundee United contract expired.

On 2 August 2025, Middleton made his first competitive appearance for Doncaster against Exeter City On 1 January 2026, Middleton scored his first goal for Doncaster, netting in the 54th minute of a 1–1 draw with Bolton Wanderers at the Eco-Power Stadium

On 29 April 2026, it was announced that Middleton had been made available for transfer.

=== Rochdale ===
On 1 September 2026, Middleton signed for Rochdale.

== International career ==
Middleton has represented Scotland at several age levels, up to and including the under-21 team.

Selected for the Scotland under-21 squad in the 2018 Toulon Tournament, the team lost to Turkey in a penalty-out and finished fourth.

== Career statistics ==
As of match played 17 May 2025

Appearances and goals by club, season and competition
Club	Season	League			Scottish Cup		League Cup		Europe		Total	
Club	Season	Division	Apps	Goals	Apps	Goals	Apps	Goals	Apps	Goals	Apps	Goals
Rangers	2018–19	Scottish Premiership	15	2	1	0	2	2	10 (Note: Appearances in the UEFA Europa League)	1	28	5
Rangers	2019–20	Scottish Premiership	0	0	0	0	0	0	0	0	0	0
Rangers	2020–21	Scottish Premiership	0	0	0	0	1	0	0	0	1	0
Rangers	2021–22	Scottish Premiership	0	0	0	0	0	0	0	0	0	0
Rangers	Total		15	2	1	0	3	2	10	1	29	5
Hibernian (loan)	2019–20	Scottish Premiership	6	0	0	0	2	0	—		8	0
Bradford City (loan)	2019–20	English League Two	3	0	0	0	0	0	0	0	3	0
St Johnstone (loan)	2020–21	Scottish Premiership	9	2	4	1	0	0	—		13	3
St Johnstone (loan)	2021–22	Scottish Premiership	28	1	1	0	2	1	4 (Note: Appearances in the UEFA Europa Conference League and the Scottish Premiership play-offs)	0	35	2
Dundee United	2022–23	Scottish Premiership	29	2	2	1	2	1	2	1	35	5
Dundee United	2023–24	Scottish Championship	36	4	1	0	7	1	0	0	44	5
Dundee United	2024–25	Scottish Premiership	29	2	1	0	6	0	0	0	36	2
Dundee United	Total		94	8	4	1	15	2	2	1	115	12
Career total			155	13	10	2	22	5	14	2	203	22

== Honours ==
St Johnstone

- Scottish Cup: 2020–21

Dundee United

- Scottish Championship: 2023–24
