= Mochrie =

Mochrie is a surname first found in Lanarkshire, a former county in the central Strathclyde region of Scotland. Notable people with the surname include:

- Chris Mochrie (born 2003), Scottish footballer
- Colin Mochrie (born 1957), Scottish-born Canadian actor and comedian
- Peter Mochrie (born 1959), Australian actor
