= Tony Watt =

Scottish footballer

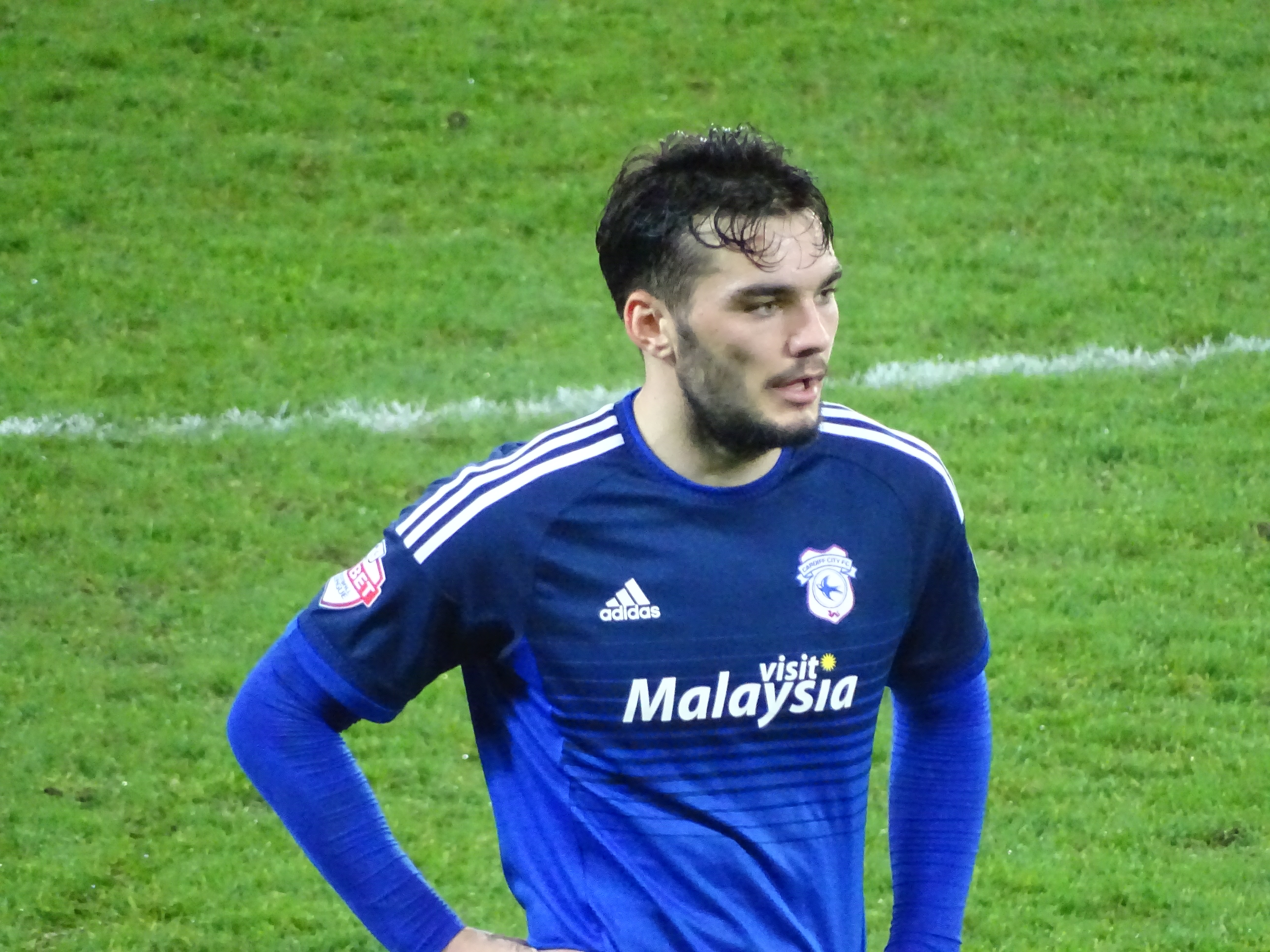
- Watt playing for Cardiff City in 2015

Personal information
- Full name: Anthony Paul Watt
- Date of birth: 29 December 1993 (age 32)
- Place of birth: Coatbridge, Scotland
- Position: Forward

Team information
- Current team: Partick Thistle
- Number: 32

Youth career
- 2009–2010: Airdrie United

Senior career*
| Years | Team | Apps | (Gls) |
| 2009–2011 | Airdrie United | 15 | (3) |
| 2011–2014 | Celtic | 25 | (7) |
| 2013–2014 | → Lierse (loan) | 15 | (9) |
| 2014–2015 | Standard Liège | 13 | (2) |
| 2015–2017 | Charlton Athletic | 53 | (9) |
| 2015–2016 | → Cardiff City (loan) | 9 | (2) |
| 2016 | → Blackburn Rovers (loan) | 9 | (1) |
| 2016 | → Heart of Midlothian (loan) | 16 | (1) |
| 2017–2018 | OH Leuven | 11 | (1) |
| 2018–2019 | St Johnstone | 29 | (3) |
| 2019–2020 | CSKA Sofia | 13 | (3) |
| 2020–2022 | Motherwell | 58 | (13) |
| 2022–2025 | Dundee United | 70 | (18) |
| 2023 | → St Mirren (loan) | 10 | (1) |
| 2024–2025 | → Motherwell (loan) | 28 | (1) |
| 2025– | Partick Thistle | 47 | (12) |

International career^{‡}
| 2011–2012 | Scotland U19 | 5 | (1) |
| 2012 | Scotland U20 | 1 | (0) |
| 2012–2013 | Scotland U21 | 9 | (5) |
| 2016 | Scotland | 1 | (0) |
- * Club domestic league appearances and goals as of 18:40, 21 November 2026 (UTC) ‡ National team caps and goals as of 14:30, 4 October 2019 (UTC)

Anthony Paul Watt (born 29 December 1993) is a Scottish professional footballer who plays as a forward for Scottish Championship club Partick Thistle.

He was a product of the Airdrie United youth academy before joining Celtic in 2011, where he scored the winning goal in a 2–1 win over FC Barcelona in the 2012–13 UEFA Champions League.

Watt fell out of favour at Celtic and spent the 2013–14 season on loan at Belgian Pro League club Lierse. He signed for another Belgian club, Standard Liège, in the summer of 2014. He returned to the UK in January 2015 to join Charlton Athletic. Charlton loaned Watt to Cardiff City, Blackburn Rovers and Heart of Midlothian. Watt then had another stint in Belgian football with OH Leuven, before returning to Scotland with St Johnstone in July 2018.

After a spell with Bulgarian club CSKA Sofia, Watt signed for Motherwell in February 2020. He then joined Dundee United in January 2022.

Watt represented Scotland at various youth levels and has played for the Scotland national team once, in March 2016.

== Club career ==
=== Airdrie United ===
Watt started his career with Airdrie United in 2009 at under-17 level after impressing youth coach Jimmy Boyle in a bounce game; previously to this he had only played football for fun. He broke into the first team squad during the 2010–11 season, making his debut on 24 July 2010, playing from the start in a Challenge Cup match against Ayr United. He made his league debut on 7 August 2010, coming on as a 60th-minute substitute against East Fife, and scored Airdrie United's third goal to draw the match 3–3. In all he made 19 appearances and scored three goals. Following his departure to Celtic, he was awarded the SFL young player of the month award for December 2010.

=== Celtic ===
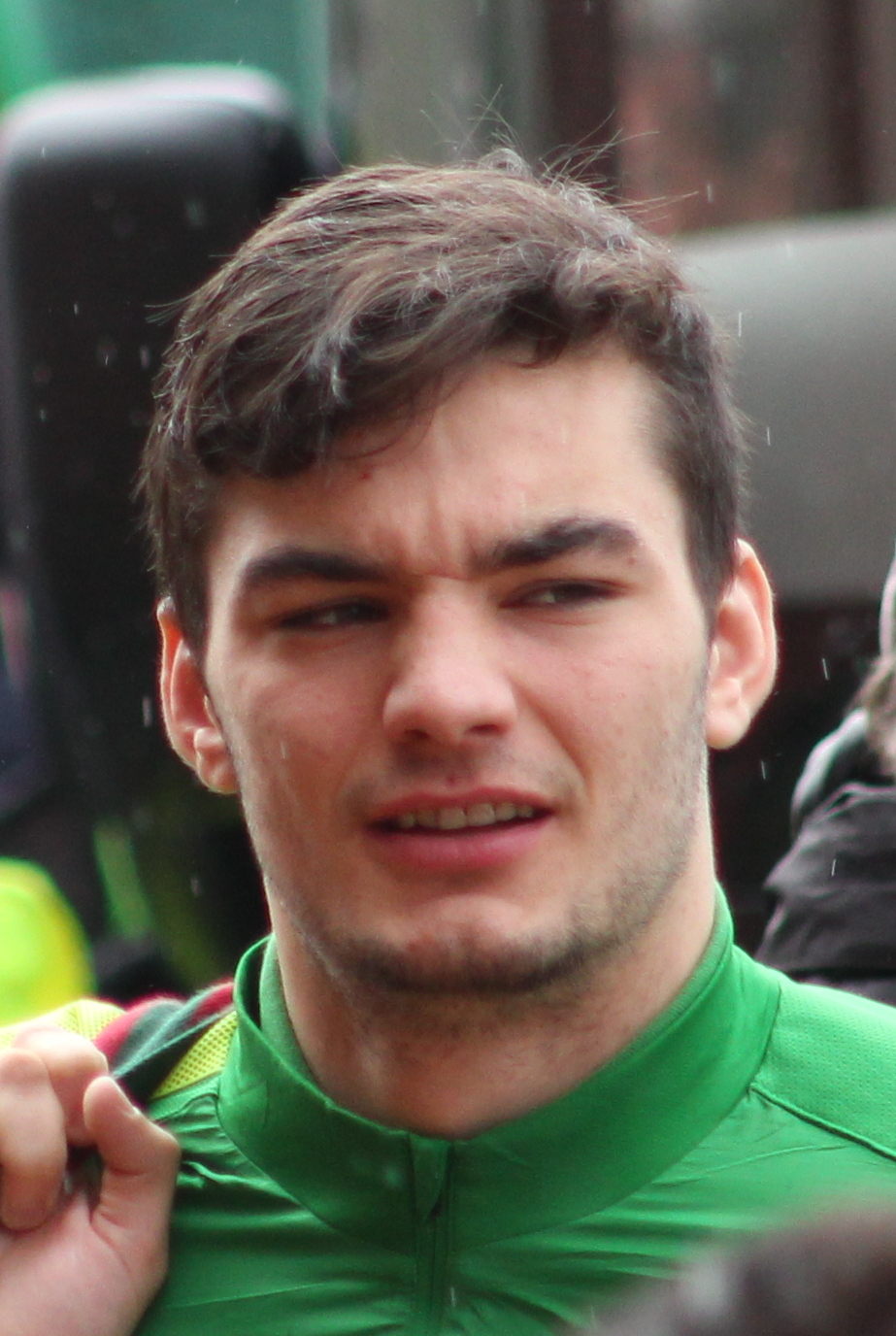
Watt at Celtic Park in 2013

Several clubs including Liverpool and Fulham showed interest in signing Watt during the 2011 January transfer window. After a trial with Rangers and a week's training with Liverpool, Watt was signed by his boyhood heroes Celtic on 4 January, for a reported fee of £80,000 and future payments dependent on his first-team progression. He signed a three-year contract. Watt made his Celtic debut on 22 April 2012 in a 3–0 win over Motherwell. He scored two goals within five minutes of coming on as a substitute.

On 25 August 2012, Watt made his first start for Celtic scoring two goals in their 4–2 away win against Inverness. He made his Champions League debut on 7 November 2012, coming on as a second-half substitute for Mikael Lustig and scoring in the 83rd minute in a 2–1 home win against Barcelona. Four days later, he came off the subs bench to score again, this time in a 1–1 draw against St Johnstone in the league. On 15 November 2012, Watt signed a new contract extending his stay with Celtic until 2016. Watt made a further 14 appearances for Celtic that season, mostly coming on as a substitute, and did not score any more goals. He did however win his first major honour as Celtic won their 44th league championship title in May 2013; his 20 league appearances over the season entitling him to a league winner's medal.

==== Lierse (loan) ====
Celtic qualified for the Champions League group stage and signed two new strikers, Amido Baldé and Teemu Pukki, minimising Watt's opportunities at Celtic. On 31 August 2013, Watt moved to Belgian Pro League club Lierse S.K. on a season long loan deal for the 2013–14 season. In September 2013, the young striker was brought on as a substitute against Kortrijk in his debut for Lierse and, within 90 seconds of being on the field, he scored with his second touch of the ball. Despite this, Watt was branded lazy and unfit by Lierse boss Stanley Menzo. In response, Watt pulled off his shirt after scoring against Lommel United a few days later in the Belgian Cup resulting in a yellow card. Watt explained: "I just wanted to show that I am not fat. I knew perfectly well that if I took my top off I would get a yellow card – it happens all over the world but I just wanted to show everyone that I am in prime condition. I am not too fat and I wanted to prove this."

Watt struggled to hold down a first team place thereafter, and was sent off on 2 November 2013, within a minute of coming on as a second-half substitute against Charleroi, however the red card was later rescinded. A week later, Watt was sent home from training after a row with manager Stanley Menzo. He was then again publicly criticised by Menzo in December 2013, with the manager stating he would not take him back from Scotland for the second half of the season. However, Watt was recalled to the side on Boxing Day and scored twice against Mechelen in a 3–0 win. Menzo commented afterwards about Watt, "Today I am glad we have him but tomorrow I might want to murder him! That's just how it is with him." Watt travelled with Lierse to Portugal in January 2014 for a mid-season friendly match against Dutch side Heerenveen, with the striker scoring both of his side's goals in a 2–3 defeat.

Despite manager Stanley Menzo's earlier threats, Watt remained with Lierse for the second half of the season. He started for Lierse on 18 January 2014 away against Kortrijk and scored twice in a 4–3 win for his side. Watt continued his run of impressive form on 31 January, scoring with a 20-yard shot in a surprise 2–0 win for Lierse over reigning Belgian champions Anderlecht. The relationship between Watt and manager Stanley Menzo remained volatile though. In February 2014 Watt stated that he loved Lierse and Belgium, however after losing his starting place in the team again during March 2014, he complained to the media that "Whenever we lose, Menzo blames me" and added that "Actually, it's his fault." Lierse responded to Watt's comments by demoting him from the first-team squad to their 'B' squad. Watt did not play for Lierse again, and returned to Celtic at the end of the season.

=== Standard Liège ===
After his loan spell in the country, a number of top Belgian clubs were reported to be showing an interest in signing Watt permanently. Watt left Celtic in July 2014 for a reported fee of £1.2 million, signing a five-year contract with Belgian club Standard Liège. He made his debut on 2 August 2014, coming on as a second-half substitute in a 3–2 league win away against Kortrijk. Watt made his next appearance three days later, again as a second-half substitute, this time in a 2–1 away win against Panathinaikos in the Champions League qualifying rounds. However, Watt failed to make much impact and by the end of December 2014 had scored only three goals with most of his appearances being as a substitute.

=== Charlton Athletic ===
The Addicks confirmed the signing of Watt on 6 January 2015. "He's a guy who can score goals, he has a lot of pace, especially round the back of the defence, and although he's only 21 he has a lot of experience already and has played in the Champions League" manager Bob Peeters said. Watt scored his first goal for Charlton in a 3–2 loss at home against Norwich on 10 February 2015. Four days later, Watt helped Charlton end a 13-game winless run in the league with a 3–0 victory over Brentford. Watt did not score but turned in an outstanding performance which included an assist for Charlton's second goal, earning him the man of the match award. On 28 February, Watt scored a brace in a 3–0 win against Huddersfield at The Valley in an impressive performance by both Charlton and Watt. For the remainder of the season he formed a formidable partnership with fellow striker Igor Vetokele.

Watt scored three goals for Charlton during the first month of 2015–16, but as the season progressed and amidst a combination of injuries and rumours of a row at training, he became a more peripheral figure at the club.

==== Cardiff City (loan) ====
On 23 November 2015, Watt was loaned to Cardiff City, until 16 January 2016, he later made his debut during a 2–2 draw with Burnley and scored his first goal the following game against Bolton Wanderers. Cardiff were hit with a transfer embargo for the January transfer window, following a breach of financial fair play rules, meaning they could not sign Watt on a permanent deal. He returned to Charlton after they rejected an extension to the loan deal, making nine appearances and scoring twice in the Welsh capital.

==== Blackburn Rovers (loan) ====
On 29 January 2016, Watt was loaned to Blackburn Rovers, until the end of the 2015–16 season, with a fee already agreed for a permanent move in the Summer of 2016. Watt scored his first goal for Rovers on his debut in an FA Cup match away to Oxford United on 30 January. Watt scored his first league goal for Rovers against Birmingham City at Ewood Park. On 7 April 2016, Watt returned to Charlton Athletic due to an injury.

==== Hearts (loan) ====
Watt was loaned to Scottish Premiership club Hearts for the 2016–17 season. On 1 January 2017, the loan deal was cut short and he returned to Charlton, having only scored once in 17 games for Hearts.

=== OH Leuven ===
On 13 August 2017, Watt returned to Belgium, signing for Belgian First Division B team Oud-Heverlee Leuven a one-year contract with the option for another season.

=== St Johnstone ===
Having left Leuven in February 2018, Watt was unable to sign for another club during the 2017–18 season. After training with Aberdeen due to a mutual connection with their manager Derek McInnes, he signed a one-year contract with St Johnstone in July 2018. On 21 July he scored for the first time since the previous August, netting the only goal of a 1–0 victory over Montrose in the group stage of the 2018–19 Scottish League Cup. He went on to score six goals in the opening nine games of the season, seeing him winning the Scottish Premiership Player of the Month award for August 2018. Watt then suffered a goal drought for four months, until scoring the only goal in the 89th minute of St Johnstone's 1–0 win over St Mirren on 26 December 2018. Manager Tommy Wright commented after the game: "We're trying to get Tony in the box more often and it's a great header from him that wins the game. That should do him a world of good." However, Watt only scored one more goal for St Johnstone, in a 2–0 win over Hamilton Accies in January 2019. In April 2019, it was announced that Watt had turned down the offer of a new contract with St Johnstone, and would leave at the end of the season.

=== CSKA Sofia ===
On 27 May 2019, Watt signed a three-year contract with Bulgarian club CSKA Sofia. He scored his first goal for the "redmen" in a competitive match on 20 July 2019, in the 3–1 league loss against Cherno More. Watt parted ways with the team by mutual consent in January 2020 for personal reasons.

=== Motherwell ===
In February 2020, Watt started training with Motherwell and he subsequently signed a short-term contract with the club on 7 February 2020

After extending his contract with Motherwell until the summer of 2021 on 29 May 2020, Watt then extended his contract with again on 9 November 2020, until the summer of 2022.

During the 2020–21 season, Watt was rewarded for his performances, by being voted as the Motherwell fans Player of the Month for four successive months from October to January. On 20 February 2021, he was named as captain for Motherwell's home match versus St Johnstone.

=== Dundee United ===
On 27 December 2021, signed a pre-contract deal with fellow Scottish Premiership club Dundee United, agreeing a three-year contract. Three weeks later, the clubs came to an agreement for Watt to join United immediately for an undisclosed transfer fee. He made his debut for United on 18 January 2022, as a substitute in a 2–1 home defeat against St Mirren.

Watt was loaned to St Mirren in January 2023.

On 29 December 2023, his 30th birthday, Watt scored a hattrick in a 3–0 win over Partick Thistle at Tannadice.

=== Partick Thistle ===
In July 2025 Watt joined Scottish Championship club Partick Thistle on a two-year deal. Watt made his Thistle debut off the bench in a 4–1 away victory over Edinburgh City in the Scottish League Cup group stages.

Watt scored his first goal for Thistle on 15 July 2025, in a 2–0 home win over Stranraer in the Scottish League Cup group stages. Watt scored his first league goal for Thistle, opening the scoring in a 3–2 home win over Raith Rovers.

== International career ==
Watt has played for Scotland U19s, his debut came on 12 May 2011, in a 1–0 loss to Denmark. He scored his first goal on 23 September 2011, in a 3–1 victory over Wales After his Celtic debut, Scotland U20s manager Billy Stark said that he wanted to move Watt up from the U19 squad to the under 20s, Watt made his debut for Scotland U21s in August 2012 in a friendly match against Belgium. He went on to make a total of nine appearances for the U21 side, scoring five times.

On 21 May 2013, Watt was called up by Gordon Strachan to the senior Scotland squad for the World Cup qualifier in Zagreb against Croatia on 7 June 2013. He did not play, and was subsequently dropped from the Under 21 side by manager Billy Stark, with Stark citing issues with Watt's fitness as the main reason for not selecting him.

Watt was called up to the senior Scotland squad again in March 2016 for a friendly against Czech Republic, and made his debut in the match on 24 March, a 1–0 win for Scotland, when he came on as a 78th-minute substitute for Ross McCormack.

== Personal life ==
Watt grew up in Coatbridge and attended St Andrew's High School.

== Career statistics ==
As of match played 21 July 2026

Appearances and goals by club, season and competition
| Club | Season | League | | | National cup (Note: Includes Scottish Cup, Belgian Cup, FA Cup, Bulgarian Cup) | | League cup (Note: Includes Scottish League Cup, EFL Cup) | | Europe | | Other | | Total | |
| Club | Season | Division | Apps | Goals | Apps | Goals | Apps | Goals | Apps | Goals | Apps | Goals | Apps | Goals |
|---|---|---|---|---|---|---|---|---|---|---|---|---|---|---|
| Airdrie United | 2010–11 | Scottish Second Division | 15 | 3 | 1 | 0 | 2 | 0 | 0 | 0 | 1 | 0 | 19 | 3 |
| Celtic | 2011–12 | Scottish Premier League | 3 | 2 | 0 | 0 | 0 | 0 | 0 | 0 | 0 | 0 | 3 | 2 |
| Celtic | 2012–13 | Scottish Premier League | 20 | 5 | 1 | 0 | 2 | 0 | 5 | 1 | 0 | 0 | 28 | 6 |
| Celtic | 2013–14 | Scottish Premiership | 2 | 0 | 0 | 0 | 0 | 0 | 1 | 0 | 0 | 0 | 3 | 0 |
| Celtic | Total | | 25 | 7 | 1 | 0 | 2 | 0 | 6 | 1 | 0 | 0 | 34 | 8 |
| Lierse (loan) | 2013–14 | Belgian Pro League | 15 | 9 | 1 | 1 | 0 | 0 | 0 | 0 | 0 | 0 | 16 | 10 |
| Standard Liège | 2014–15 | Belgian Pro League | 13 | 2 | 1 | 1 | 0 | 0 | 7 | 0 | 0 | 0 | 21 | 3 |
| Charlton Athletic | 2014–15 | Championship | 22 | 5 | 0 | 0 | 0 | 0 | 0 | 0 | 0 | 0 | 22 | 5 |
| Charlton Athletic | 2015–16 | Championship | 14 | 2 | 0 | 0 | 2 | 1 | 0 | 0 | 0 | 0 | 15 | 3 |
| Charlton Athletic | 2016–17 | League One | 16 | 2 | 0 | 0 | 0 | 0 | 0 | 0 | 0 | 0 | 16 | 2 |
| Charlton Athletic | 2017–18 | League One | 1 | 0 | 0 | 0 | 1 | 0 | 0 | 0 | 0 | 0 | 2 | 0 |
| Charlton Athletic | Total | | 53 | 9 | 0 | 0 | 3 | 1 | 0 | 0 | 0 | 0 | 56 | 10 |
| Cardiff City (loan) | 2015–16 | Championship | 9 | 2 | 0 | 0 | 0 | 0 | 0 | 0 | 0 | 0 | 9 | 2 |
| Blackburn Rovers (loan) | 2015–16 | Championship | 9 | 1 | 2 | 1 | 0 | 0 | 0 | 0 | 0 | 0 | 11 | 2 |
| Heart of Midlothian (loan) | 2016–17 | Scottish Premiership | 16 | 1 | 0 | 0 | 1 | 0 | 0 | 0 | 0 | 0 | 17 | 1 |
| OH Leuven | 2017–18 | Belgian First Division B | 11 | 1 | 1 | 1 | 0 | 0 | 0 | 0 | 0 | 0 | 12 | 2 |
| St Johnstone | 2018–19 | Scottish Premiership | 29 | 3 | 2 | 1 | 6 | 4 | 0 | 0 | 0 | 0 | 37 | 8 |
| CSKA Sofia | 2019–20 | First Professional Football League | 13 | 3 | 2 | 2 | 0 | 0 | 3 | 0 | 0 | 0 | 18 | 5 |
| Motherwell | 2019–20 | Scottish Premiership | 4 | 1 | 2 | 1 | 0 | 0 | 0 | 0 | 0 | 0 | 6 | 2 |
| Motherwell | 2020–21 | Scottish Premiership | 35 | 3 | 1 | 1 | 1 | 1 | 3 | 2 | 0 | 0 | 40 | 7 |
| Motherwell | 2021–22 | Scottish Premiership | 19 | 9 | 0 | 0 | 5 | 1 | 0 | 0 | 0 | 0 | 24 | 10 |
| Motherwell | Total | | 58 | 13 | 3 | 2 | 6 | 2 | 3 | 2 | 0 | 0 | 70 | 19 |
| Dundee United | 2021–22 | Scottish Premiership | 17 | 1 | 2 | 0 | 0 | 0 | 0 | 0 | 0 | 0 | 19 | 1 |
| Dundee United | 2022–23 | Scottish Premiership | 17 | 4 | 0 | 0 | 2 | 0 | 2 | 0 | 0 | 0 | 21 | 4 |
| Dundee United | 2023–24 | Scottish Championship | 36 | 13 | 0 | 0 | 4 | 0 | 0 | 0 | 3 | 2 | 43 | 15 |
| Dundee United | 2024–25 | Scottish Premiership | 0 | 0 | 0 | 0 | 3 | 0 | 0 | 0 | 0 | 0 | 3 | 0 |
| Dundee United | Total | | 70 | 18 | 2 | 0 | 9 | 0 | 2 | 0 | 3 | 2 | 86 | 20 |
| St Mirren (loan) | 2022–23 | Scottish Premiership | 10 | 1 | 1 | 0 | 0 | 0 | 0 | 0 | 0 | 0 | 11 | 1 |
| Motherwell (loan) | 2024–25 | Scottish Premiership | 28 | 1 | 1 | 0 | 1 | 0 | 0 | 0 | 0 | 0 | 30 | 1 |
| Partick Thistle | 2025–26 | Scottish Championship | 31 | 6 | 3 | 3 | 5 | 2 | 0 | 0 | 6 | 0 | 45 | 11 |
| Partick Thistle | 2026–27 | Scottish Championship | 0 | 0 | 0 | 0 | 3 | 1 | 0 | 0 | 0 | 0 | 3 | 1 |
| Partick Thistle | Total | | 31 | 6 | 3 | 3 | 8 | 3 | 0 | 0 | 6 | 0 | 48 | 12 |
| Career total | | | 405 | 80 | 21 | 12 | 38 | 10 | 21 | 3 | 10 | 2 | 495 | 107 |

== Honours ==
Celtic

- Scottish Premier League: 2012–13

Dundee United

- Scottish Championship: 2023–24

Individual

- Scottish Premiership Player of the Month: August 2018
- SFL Young Player of the Month: December 2010
- SPL Young Player of the Month: August 2012
