= Kai Fotheringham =

Scottish footballer (born 2003)

Personal information
- Full name: Kai Colin Fotheringham
- Date of birth: 18 April 2003 (age 23)
- Place of birth: Larbert, Scotland
- Height: 5 ft 7 in (1.69 m)
- Position: Forward

Team information
- Current team: St Johnstone
- Number: 21

Youth career
- Dundee United BC
- Falkirk Academy
- -2017: Forth Valley Academy
- 2017-2020: Dundee United

Senior career*
| Years | Team | Apps | (Gls) |
| 2020–2025 | Dundee United | 63 | (12) |
| 2021 | → Falkirk (loan) | 11 | (1) |
| 2021 | → Raith Rovers (loan) | 5 | (0) |
| 2022 | → Cove Rangers (loan) | 5 | (0) |
| 2022–2023 | → Stirling Albion (loan) | 13 | (5) |
| 2025– | St Johnstone | 23 | (4) |

International career^{‡}
| 2019 | Scotland U16 | 1 | (0) |
| 2023– | Scotland U21 | 1 | (0) |
- * Club domestic league appearances and goals as of 4 May 2026 ‡ National team caps and goals as of 05:10, 18 November 2023 (UTC)

Kai Colin Fotheringham (born 18 April 2003) is a Scottish professional footballer who plays as a forward for St Johnstone. He made his senior debut for Dundee United in 2020 and has also spent time on loan with Falkirk, Raith Rovers, Cove Rangers and Stirling Albion.

== Club career ==
Fotheringham joined Dundee United at youth level. In August 2020 he extended his contract with the club until 2023. He made his senior debut in a 6-2 win against Brechin City in a Scottish League Cup match on 7 October 2020. His league debut was in a 5-1 Scottish Premiership defeat against St Mirren on 27 January 2021.

Fotheringham was loaned to League One club Falkirk in March 2021 and made his debut for them against Montrose on 20 March. Three days later he scored a late winning goal in Falkirk's Scottish Cup tie against Arbroath after coming on as a substitute.

In July 2021, Fotheringham joined Championship club Raith Rovers on a season-long loan. On 2 February 2022, Fotheringham joined Scottish League One side Cove Rangers on loan for the remainder of the 2021–22 season. He was then loaned to Stirling Albion in August 2022 but would be recalled six months later, continuing his development with the Dundee United first-team.

On 25 August 2025, Fotheringham joined St Johnstone for an undisclosed fee.

== International career ==
Fotheringham represented Scotland at under-16 level, playing against Australia in 2019, and made his debut at under-21 level in November 2023.

== Career statistics ==
As of match played 30 January 2026

Appearances and goals by club, season and competition
| Club | Season | League | | | Scottish Cup | | League Cup | | Other | | Total | |
| Club | Season | Division | Apps | Goals | Apps | Goals | Apps | Goals | Apps | Goals | Apps | Goals |
|---|---|---|---|---|---|---|---|---|---|---|---|---|
| Dundee United | 2020–21 | Scottish Premiership | 1 | 0 | 0 | 0 | 2 | 0 | — | | 3 | 0 |
| Dundee United | 2021–22 | Scottish Premiership | 0 | 0 | 0 | 0 | 0 | 0 | — | | 0 | 0 |
| Dundee United | 2022–23 | Scottish Premiership | 11 | 0 | 0 | 0 | 0 | 0 | 0 | 0 | 11 | 0 |
| Dundee United | 2023–24 | Scottish Championship | 35 | 12 | 1 | 2 | 3 | 1 | 2 (Note: Appearance(s) in Scottish Challenge Cup) | 0 | 41 | 15 |
| Dundee United | 2024–25 | Scottish Premiership | 16 | 0 | 0 | 0 | 4 | 0 | — | | 20 | 0 |
| Dundee United | 2025–26 | Scottish Premiership | 2 | 0 | — | | 0 | 0 | 2 (Note: Appearance(s) in UEFA Europa Conference League) | 0 | 4 | 0 |
| Dundee United | Total | | 65 | 12 | 1 | 2 | 9 | 1 | 4 | 0 | 79 | 15 |
| Falkirk (loan) | 2020–21 | Scottish League One | 11 | 0 | 2 | 1 | — | | — | | 13 | 1 |
| Raith Rovers (loan) | 2021–22 | Scottish Championship | 5 | 0 | — | | 2 | 0 | 0 | 0 | 7 | 0 |
| Dundee United B | 2021–22 | — | | | — | | — | | 1 | 0 | 1 | 0 |
| Dundee United B | 2022–23 | — | | | — | | — | | 1 | 0 | 1 | 0 |
| Dundee United B | Total | | 16 | 0 | — | | — | | 2 | 0 | 2 | 0 |
| Cove Rangers (loan) | 2021–22 | Scottish League One | 5 | 0 | — | | — | | 0 | 0 | 5 | 0 |
| Stirling Albion (loan) | 2022–23 | Scottish League Two | 15 | 5 | 2 | 0 | 0 | 0 | 0 | 0 | 17 | 5 |
| St Johnstone | 2025–26 | Scottish Championship | 17 | 3 | 1 | 0 | — | | 1 | 0 | 19 | 3 |
| St Johnstone | 2026—27 | Scottish Premiership | 8 | 1 | 0 | - | 4 | 1 | | | | |
| Career total | | | 118 | 21 | 6 | 3 | 15 | 2 | 7 | 0 | 142 | 24 |

== Honours ==
Cove Rangers

- Scottish League One: 2021-22

Stirling Albion

- Scottish League Two: 2022-23

Dundee United

- Scottish Championship: 2023-24

St Johnstone

- Scottish Championship: 2025–26
