= Sadat Anaku =

Ugandan footballer (born 2000)

Personal information
- Full name: Sadat Happy Anaku Ana
- Date of birth: 9 December 2000 (age 25)
- Place of birth: Arua, Uganda
- Position: Forward

Team information
- Current team: Hartford Athletic
- Number: 17

Youth career
- Kampala Capital City Authority

Senior career*
Years	Team	Apps	(Gls)
2019–2022	Kampala Capital City Authority		
2022–2024	Dundee United	14	(0)
2024–2025	Kampala Capital City Authority		
2026–	Hartford Athletic	25	(4)
- * Club domestic league appearances and goals as of 22:55, 4 November 2026 (UTC)

Sadat Happy Anaku Ana (born 9 December 2000) is a Ugandan professional footballer who plays as a forward for Hartford Athletic.

Anaku began his career with Kampala Capital City Authority, having set a goalscoring record in the junior leagues. He was signed by Scottish Premiership club Dundee United in August 2022 and played 16 games before being sidelined due to injury in April 2023. After leaving United in the summer of 2024, he returned to Kampala Capital City Authority in October of that year.

== Club career ==
=== Kampala Capital City Authority ===
Anaku played in his native Uganda for Kampala Capital City Authority. He was the 2018–19 Juniors League top scorer with 31 goals. He was subsequently promoted to the senior squad after making himself the all-time top scorer of the Juniors League with 84 goals in three seasons. He played in the 2019 final of the Kagame Interclub Cup, which ended in a 1–0 victory over Azam. He set himself a target of 15 goals for the 2020–21 season. However, a licensing issue prevented him from playing in some matches. Head coach Mike Mutebi said that Anaku would be his first-choice striker in the Uganda Premier League after recovering from a hamstring injury.

=== Dundee United ===
On 20 August 2022, Anaku signed a two-year contract with Scottish Premiership club Dundee United, following a successful trial. Craig Levein said the following month that Anaku's pace would combine well with Steven Fletcher to solve the team's attacking problems which had cost manager Jack Ross his job. His successor, Liam Fox, said that he was happy with Anaku's progress in the first half of the 2022–23 season. Jim Goodwin, who followed Fox as the manager in March, said that Anaku was "very raw" and needed a lot of coaching to utilise his pace and positivity effectively. However, he suffered an Achilles injury in April 2023 and was ruled out for the rest of the calendar year. He did not feature in the 2023–24 season and was one of eleven players released from Tannadice at the end of the campaign.

=== Return to Kampala Capital City Authority ===
After leaving Dundee, he had a trial with English club Port Vale in July 2024.

He re-signed for Kampala Capital City Authority in October 2024.

=== Hartford Athletic ===
He signed for Hartford Athletic in November 2025, for the 2026 season.

== International career ==
In September 2021, Anaku represented a Ugandan select team on a regional tour, and in February 2022 he represented a Ugandan select team in an exhibition match in Spain. He was called up to the Ugandan senior national team by manager Milutin Sredojevic in March 2023.

== Career statistics ==
As of match played 9 April 2023

Appearances and goals by club, season and competition
Club	Season	League			FA Cup		League Cup		Other		Total	
Club	Season	Division	Apps	Goals	Apps	Goals	Apps	Goals	Apps	Goals	Apps	Goals
Dundee United	2022–23	Scottish Premiership	14	0	1	0	1	0	0	0	16	0
Dundee United	2023–24	Scottish Championship	0	0	0	0	0	0	0	0	0	0
Dundee United	Total		14	0	1	0	1	0	0	0	16	0
Career total			14	0	1	0	1	0	0	0	16	0

== Honours ==
Kampala Capital City Authority

- Kagame Interclub Cup: 2019
