= Flynn Duffy =

Scottish footballer (born 2003)

Personal information
- Date of birth: 13 August 2003 (age 23)
- Place of birth: Dundee, Scotland
- Height: 1.74 m (5 ft 9 in)
- Position: Left back

Team information
- Current team: Montrose
- Number: 3

Youth career
- 2012–2021: Dundee United

Senior career*
Years	Team	Apps	(Gls)
2020–2024	Dundee United	0	(0)
2021–2022	→ Peterhead (loan)	26	(0)
2023	→ Stirling Albion (loan)	13	(2)
2024	→ Peterhead (loan)	16	(1)
2024	Inverness Caledonian Thistle	5	(0)
2024–2025	Airdrieonians	10	(0)
2025–2026	Peterhead	30	(0)
2026–	Montrose	11	(0)
- * Club domestic league appearances and goals as of 18 October 2026

Flynn Duffy (born 13 August 2003) is a Scottish professional footballer who plays as a left back for Scottish League One side Montrose.

== Career ==
Duffy started his career at Dundee United, rising through the youth ranks, before signing a professional deal in 2020, however, he only made 4 league cup appearances for The Arabs, being sent on loan to Peterhead twice in September 2021 and January 2024, respectively, and Stirling Albion for the second half of the 2022–23 season, helping The Binos win League Two for the first time in their history.

On 1 July 2024, Duffy was released by Dundee United, before being handed a trial by Inverness Caledonian Thistle in a 1–0 pre-season friendly loss against Raith Rovers.

On 2 August, Duffy signed for Inverness Caledonian Thistle, making his league debut the following day in a 1–1 draw against Dumbarton. On 24 October 2024, his contract was terminated, as Inverness entered administration. On 2 November 2024, Flynn signed with Scottish League One club Airdrieonians.

On 29 June 2026, Duffy signed a one-year contract with Scottish League One side Montrose, with an option for a further year.

== Career statistics ==
As of match played 1 November 2025

Appearances and goals by club, season and competition
Club	Season	League			Scottish Cup		League Cup		Continental		Other		Total	
Club	Season	Division	Apps	Goals	Apps	Goals	Apps	Goals	Apps	Goals	Apps	Goals	Apps	Goals
Dundee United	2021–22	Scottish Premiership	0	0	0	0	3	0	—		—		3	0
Dundee United	2022–23	Scottish Premiership	0	0	0	0	0	0	0	0	—		0	0
Dundee United	2023–24	Scottish Championship	0	0	0	0	1	0	—		1 (Note: Appearance(s) in Scottish League Challenge Cup)	0	2	0
Dundee United	Total		0	0	0	0	4	0	0	0	1	0	5	0
Dundee United B	2021–22	—			—		—		—		1	0	1	0
Peterhead (loan)	2021–22	Scottish League One	26	0	3	0	—		—		—		29	0
Stirling Albion (loan)	2022–23	Scottish League Two	13	2	—		—		—		—		13	2
Peterhead (loan)	2023–24	Scottish League Two	16	1	—		—		—		2 (Note: Appearance(s) in Scottish League One play-offs)	0	18	1
Inverness Caledonian Thistle	2024–25	Scottish League One	5	0	—		0	0	—		0	0	5	0
Airdrieonians	2024–25	Scottish Championship	10	0	2	0	—		—		1 (Note: Appearance(s) in Scottish Championship play-offs)	0	13	0
Peterhead	2025–26	Scottish League One	10	0	0	0	0	0	—		5	0	15	0
Career total			80	3	5	0	4	0	0	0	10	0	99	3

== Honours ==
Stirling Albion

- Scottish League Two: 2022–23
