= Kieran Freeman =

Scottish association football player

Personal information
- Full name: Kieran Ewan Freeman
- Date of birth: 30 March 2000 (age 26)
- Place of birth: Aberdeen, Scotland
- Height: 5 ft 10 in (1.79 m)
- Position: Defender

Team information
- Current team: Montrose
- Number: 12

Youth career
- Dundee United
- 2016–2020: Southampton

Senior career*
Years	Team	Apps	(Gls)
2020–2024	Dundee United	53	(2)
2020–2021	→ Peterhead (loan)	11	(0)
2021	→ Peterhead (loan)	11	(0)
2024	St Patrick's Athletic	8	(0)
2024–2025	Raith Rovers	7	(0)
2025	→ Montrose (loan)	16	(0)
2025–	Montrose	35	(4)

International career
2014	Scotland U15	12	(0)
2014	Scotland U16	8	(0)
2022	Scotland U21	2	(0)
- * Club domestic league appearances and goals as of 4 May 2026

Kieran Ewan Freeman (born 20 March 2000) is a Scottish professional footballer who plays as a right-back for Scottish League One club Montrose. He grew up in Inverbervie, Aberdeenshire.

== Career ==
=== Club ===
A product of the Scottish Football Association's Performance School based at St John's Roman Catholic High School in Dundee, Freeman played for Dundee United at youth level before leaving in July 2016, aged 16, to sign his first professional contract with Premier League club Southampton. He suffered three serious injuries in his first two years at Southampton, but was offered a new short-term contract by the club at the end of the 2018–19 season.

Following the expiry of his Southampton contract, Freeman returned to Dundee United on trial in January 2020 and was subsequently offered a contract until the end of the 2019–20 season. In May 2020, he signed a two-year contract extension. He made his senior debut on 15 August 2020, in Dundee United's 2–1 Scottish Premiership win away to Ross County. Freeman joined Scottish League One club Peterhead on a season-long loan in September 2020, but after making 14 appearances his loan was cut short in January 2021 when the lower divisions were suspended due to the COVID-19 pandemic. He returned on loan to Peterhead in March 2021, after the suspension was lifted.

Freeman scored his first goal for Dundee United on 14 July 2021, in a 6–1 win over Elgin City in the Scottish League Cup. Given a run of regular starting appearances due to Liam Smith being out injured, he scored his first league goal in a 3-0 win over Hibernian at Easter Road in October 2021, and subsequently extended his contract by a further two years.

On 21 February 2024, Freeman joined League of Ireland Premier Division club St Patrick's Athletic on a permanent basis. On 24 June 2024, it was announced that Freeman's contract had been terminated by mutual consent after 9 appearances with the club.

On 24 June 2024, it was announced that he had signed for Scottish Championship club Raith Rovers.

On 24 January 2025, Freeman joined Scottish League One side Montrose on loan for the remainder of the season. On 15 May 2025, he agreed pre-contract terms to join Montrose permanently on a two-year deal.

=== International ===
Freeman represented Scotland at under-15 and under-16 international level in 2014. In 2022 he was called up to the under-21 squad for European Championship Qualifiers against Belgium and Denmark, playing in both games.

== Career statistics ==
As of match played on 3 May 2025

Appearances and goals by club, season and competition
Club	Season	League			National Cup		League Cup		Europe		Other		Total	
Club	Season	Division	Apps	Goals	Apps	Goals	Apps	Goals	Apps	Goals	Apps	Goals	Apps	Goals
Dundee United	2020–21	Scottish Premiership	3	0	0	0	0	0	–		–		3	0
Dundee United	2021–22	Scottish Premiership	23	1	2	0	5	1	–		1 (Note: Appearances in the Scottish Challenge Cup)	0	31	2
Dundee United	2022–23	Scottish Premiership	24	1	1	0	1	0	1 (Note: Appearances in the UEFA Europa Conference League)	0	0	0	27	1
Dundee United	2023–24	Scottish Championship	3	0	0	0	3	0	–		1	0	7	0
Dundee United	Total		53	2	3	0	9	1	1	0	2	0	68	3
Peterhead (loan)	2020–21	Scottish League One	11	0	–		3	0	–		0	0	14	0
Peterhead (loan)	2020–21	Scottish League One	11	0	1	0	–		–		0	0	12	0
St Patrick's Athletic	2024	LOI Premier Division	8	0	–		–		–		1 (Note: Appearances in the Leinster Senior Cup)	0	9	0
Raith Rovers	2024–25	Scottish Championship	7	0	0	0	4	0	–		1	0	12	0
Montrose (loan)	2024–25	Scottish League One	16	0	0	0	0	0	—		0	0	16	0
Career total			106	2	4	0	16	1	1	0	4	0	131	3
