= Miller Thomson (footballer) =

Scottish footballer

- Thomson with Dundee United in 2026

Personal information
- Date of birth: 20 July 2004 (age 22)
- Place of birth: Kirkcaldy, Fife, Scotland
- Positions: Right back; right winger

Team information
- Current team: Stenhousemuir (on loan from Dundee United)
- Number: 29

Youth career
- –2015: East Fife
- 2015–2021: Dundee United

Senior career*
Years	Team	Apps	(Gls)
2021–	Dundee United	24	(1)
2023–2024	→ Montrose (loan)	12	(3)
2025	→ Falkirk (loan)	9	(0)
2025–2026	→ Ross County (loan)	6	(1)
2026–	→ Stenhousemuir (loan)	1	(0)

International career^{‡}
2024–	Scotland U21	1	(0)
- * Club domestic league appearances and goals as of 21:00, 17 October 2026 (UTC) ‡ National team caps and goals as of 10:00 24 October 2024 (UTC)

Miller Thomson (born 20 July 2004) is a Scottish professional footballer who plays as a midfielder for Scottish Championship club Stenhousemuir, on loan from Scottish Premiership club Dundee United. He made his senior debut in 2022, aged 17.

== Club career ==
Miller Thomson joined the Dundee United Academy at the age of 11 from local club East Fife and graduated through the Scottish Football Association Performance School at St John's Roman Catholic High School in Dundee. In February 2022 he extended his contract with Dundee United until 2024 after good performances for the under-18 team and having been included in the first team squad. He made his first team debut aged 17, as a substitute in a 3–0 Scottish Cup defeat against Celtic on 14 March 2022. In United's next match, away to St Mirren in the Scottish Premiership, Thomson made his first starting appearance, but was substituted at half time.

In August 2023, Thomson joined Scottish League One club Montrose on loan until January 2024.

In August 2024 Thomson scored his first goal for United in a 2-2 draw with city rivals Dundee at Tannadice.

On 3 February 2025, Thomson joined Scottish Championship club Falkirk on loan until the end of the season.

On 30 September 2025 Thomson joined Ross County on loan. Thomson scored his first goal for the club on his debut 4 days later.

On 1 October 2026, Thomson joined Scottish Championship side Stenhousemuir on loan until January 2027.

== Career statistics ==
=== Club ===
As of match played 4 March 2025

Appearances and goals by club, season and competition
Club	Season	League			Scottish Cup		Scottish League Cup		Continental Competitions		Other		Total	
Club	Season	Division	Apps	Goals	Apps	Goals	Apps	Goals	Apps	Goals	Apps	Goals	Apps	Goals
Dundee United	2021-22	Scottish Premiership	1	0	1	0	0	0	—		—		2	0
Dundee United	2022-23	Scottish Premiership	3	0	0	0	0	0	0	0	3 (Note: Appearance(s) in Scottish Premiership Relegation Round)	0	6	0
Dundee United	2023-24	Scottish Championship	15	0	0	0	1	0	—		0	0	16	0
Dundee United	2024-25	Scottish Premiership	14	1	0	0	4	0	—		—		18	1
Dundee United	2025-26	Scottish Premiership	2	0	0	0	0	0	1	0	—		0	0
Dundee United	Total		35	1	1	0	5	0	1	0	3	0	40	1
Dundee United B	2022-23	—			—		—		—		1 (Note: Appearance(s) in Scottish Challenge Cup)	0	1	0
Dundee United B	2024-25	—			—		—		—		0	0	0	0
Dundee United B	Total		—		—		—		—		1	0	1	0
Montrose (loan)	2023-24	Scottish League One	12	3	0	0	0	0	—		2	0	14	3
Falkirk (loan)	2024-25	Scottish Championship	4	0	0	0	0	0	—		0	0	4	0
Ross County (loan)	2025-26	Scottish Championship	6	1	0	0	1	0	—		0	0	7	1
Stenhousemuir (loan)	2026-27	Scottish Championship	1	0	0	0	0	0	—		0	0	1	0
Career total			58	5	1	0	6	0	1	0	6	0	67	5

== Honours ==
Dundee United

- Scottish Championship: 2023-24

Falkirk

- Scottish Championship: 2024-25
