= Mathew Cudjoe =

Ghanaian footballer (born 2003)

Personal information
- Full name: Mathew Anim Cudjoe
- Date of birth: 11 November 2003 (age 23)
- Place of birth: Prestea, Ghana
- Height: 1.68 m (5 ft 6 in)
- Position: Midfielder

Team information
- Current team: Bnei Sakhnin
- Number: 10

Youth career
- Great Somas
- 2018–2019: Young Apostles

Senior career*
Years	Team	Apps	(Gls)
2019–2021	Young Apostles	0	(0)
2019–2020	→ Asante Kotoko (loan)	6	(1)
2020–2021	→ Legon Cities (loan)	12	(2)
2021–2024	Dundee United	36	(4)
2024–	Bnei Sakhnin	52	(4)

International career
2019–	Ghana U20	6	(0)
- * Club domestic league appearances and goals as of 24 June 2026

Mathew Anim Cudjoe (born 11 November 2003) is a Ghanaian footballer who plays as a midfielder for Bnei Sakhnin and the Ghana national under-20 football team.

Cudjoe began his career with Ghana Division Two team Young Apostles. He went on to play for Ghana Premier League sides Asante Kotoko and Legon Cities. He most recently played for Dundee United.

== Club career ==
=== Youth career ===
Cudjoe started his career with Great Somas in Accra till he transferred to Sunyani based a Division Two club Young Apostles, managed by Ghanaian football administrator Samuel Anim Addo. Samuel Anim Addo is also Cudjoe's manager and football agent, he happens to be the Manager of Ghanaian Striker Asamoah Gyan as well.

Cudjoe was scouted and later signed up by Addo after he had competed in the maiden edition of the BabyJet U-16 tournament at the Asamoah Gyan Sports Complex in Accra Academy. He scored 6 goals at the end of the tournament, scoring a hattrick in one of the matches, to help his team win the tournament.

He also ended the tournament as the top goalscorer and was crowned the overall best player. Cudjoe made his first team debut for Dundee United in a 1/1 draw with Hibernian on April 2, 2022, when he came on as a sub and immediately made an impression

=== Asante Kotoko (loan) ===
Cudjoe signed by Asante Kotoko in December 2019 on a season-long deal. On 22 December 2019, he won his first trophy with the club, after Asante Kotoko defeated their rivals Hearts of Oak by 2–1 victory in the President's Cup.

He made his professional league debut in the Ghana Premier League on 1 January 2020 at the age of 16 years in a match against Legon Cities FC, coming on as a substitute in the 84th minute replacing Emmanuel Gyamfi. In a match against rivals Hearts of Oak on 24 January 2020, Cudjoe was brought on as a substitute with the match in a 1–1 draw stance, when he was brought on, he was fouled in the penalty box which drew a penalty that was scored by Naby Keita in the 90th minute to help the team win 2–1 as the end of the match.

He scored his debut Ghana Premier League goal in a home match against Ebusua Dwarfs, helping Asante Kotoko to secure a 2–0 victory. He played 6 matches and scored 1 goal as the 2019–2020 season came to an abrupt end due to the COVID-19 pandemic. After his loan deal ended Asante Kotoko tried to sign him on a long-term deal but the deal fell through and no agreement was made. He became a fan favourite during his time at the club.

=== Legon Cities (loan) ===
Cudjoe was signed on season long loan deal by Accra-based team, Legon Cities FC. He was signed as part of the signing deal of Asamoah Gyan. He was not unveiled as part of the team's new players unveiling session but was later unveiled on his 17th Birthday on 11 November 2020 via the club's social media handles.

=== Dundee United ===
On 17 November 2021, Scottish Premiership team Dundee United announced the signing of Cudjoe subject to international clearance, upon approval of his Visa application. Cudjoe made his first team debut for Dundee United in a 1–1 draw with Hibernian on 2 April 2022 when he came on as a substitute.

Cudjoe made his first start on 9 May in a league game against Rangers. He scored his first his first competitive goal for Dundee United in a 4–0 victory in Arbroath on the 4th of August 2023. Despite some promising performances, he failed to agree a new deal with the Scottish club and left in the summer of 2024.

== International career ==
Cudjoe was a member of the Ghana national under-20 football team at the 2019 African Games. He started in the final match of the group stage against Mali as Ghana lost by 4-2 and were eliminated from the competition.

He was also a member of the Black Satellites at the WAFU B U-20 Championship in 2020. He played in all matches at the tournament helping the team to finish as champions of West Africa Zone B and qualify for the 2021 Africa U-20 Cup of Nations.

== Career statistics ==
=== Club ===
As of 1 June 2024

Club	Season	League			National Cup		Continental		Other		Total	
Club	Season	Division	Apps	Goals	Apps	Goals	Apps	Goals	Apps	Goals	Apps	Goals
Asante Kotoko	2019–20	Ghana Premier League	6	1	0	0	–		–		6	1
Legon Cities	2020–21	Ghana Premier League	12	2	0	0	–		–		12	2
Dundee United	2021–22	Scottish Premiership	2	0	–		–		–		2	0
Dundee United	2022–23	Scottish Premiership	12	0	2	0	1	0	1	0	16	0
Dundee United	2023–24	Scottish Championship	22	4	1	0	–		2	1	25	5
Dundee United	Total		36	4	3	0	1	0	3	1	43	5
Bnei Sakhnin	2024–25	Israeli Premier League	0	0	0	0	–		–		0	0
Career total			54	7	3	0	1	0	3	1	61	8

== Honours ==
Dundee United

- Scottish Championship: 2023–24

Asante Kotoko

- President's Cup: 2019

Ghana U20

- Africa U-20 Cup of Nations: 2021
- WAFU Zone B U-20 Tournament: 2020
