= Callum Moore (Scottish footballer) =

Scottish footballer

Personal information
- Date of birth: 22 March 2000 (age 26)
- Place of birth: Arbroath, Scotland
- Position: Midfielder

Team information
- Current team: Lochee United

Youth career
- Dundee

Senior career*
Years	Team	Apps	(Gls)
2018–2021	Dundee	5	(0)
2020	→ Stenhousemuir (loan)	8	(1)
2021	→ Forfar Athletic (loan)	12	(0)
2021–2024	Forfar Athletic	62	(0)
2024–	Lochee United	13	(3)
- * Club domestic league appearances and goals as of 16:00, 5 October 2024 (UTC)

Callum Moore (born 22 March 2000) is a Scottish professional footballer who plays as a midfielder for Lochee United.

== Career ==
Moore made his debut for Dundee on 23 January 2019, coming on as a substitute in a 1–2 away win against Heart of Midlothian.

He moved on loan to Stenhousemuir in January 2020. In March 2021 following the resumption of the Scottish lower leagues after restrictions being lifted during the COVID-19 pandemic, Moore joined Scottish League One side Forfar Athletic on loan until the end of the season. In June 2021, Moore turned down a new contract offer and left Dundee.

On 16 December 2021, Moore rejoined Forfar Athletic on a deal until the end of the season. After impressing in his short stint, Moore received a one-year contract extension in May 2022. Moore scored his first goal for Forfar in August, in a Scottish Challenge Cup game against Kelty Hearts. Moore received another one-year extension from the Loons in May 2023.

On 27 March 2024, Moore left Forfar and joined Midlands League club Lochee United, joining his brother Craig on his loan deal from Dundee United. Moore made his debut the same day, coming off the bench and assisting a goal in a top-of-the-table victory away to Broughty Athletic.

== Personal life ==
Callum is the brother of fellow footballer and Dundee United player Craig Moore.

== Career statistics ==
As of 5 October 2024

Appearances and goals by club, season and competition
Club	Season	League			Scottish Cup		League Cup		Other		Total	
Club	Season	Division	Apps	Goals	Apps	Goals	Apps	Goals	Apps	Goals	Apps	Goals
Dundee	2018–19	Scottish Premiership	3	0	1	0	0	0	—		4	0
Dundee	2019–20	Scottish Championship	1	0	0	0	1	0	0	0	2	0
Dundee	2020–21	Scottish Championship	1	0	1	0	0	0	0	0	2	0
Dundee	Total		5	0	2	0	1	0	0	0	8	0
Stenhousemuir (loan)	2019–20	Scottish League Two	8	1	0	0	0	0	0	0	8	1
Forfar Athletic (loan)	2020–21	Scottish League One	12	0	0	0	0	0	0	0	12	0
Forfar Athletic	2021–22	Scottish League Two	18	0	—		—		1 (Note: Appearance in the Scottish League One play-offs)	0	19	0
Forfar Athletic	2022–23	Scottish League Two	26	0	1	0	4	0	1 (Note: Appearance in the Scottish Challenge Cup)	1	32	1
Forfar Athletic	2023–24	Scottish League Two	18	0	2	0	3	0	0	0	23	0
Forfar Athletic	Total		62	0	3	0	7	0	2	1	74	1
Lochee United	2023–24	Midlands League	7	0	—		—		1 (Note: Appearance(s) in the North & Tayside Inter-Regional Cup)	0	8	0
Lochee United	2024–25	Midlands League	6	3	1	0	—		2 (Note: Appearance(s) in the East of Scotland Cup and the Scottish Junior Cup)	1	9	4
Lochee United	Total		13	3	1	0	0	0	3	1	17	4
Career total			99	4	6	0	8	0	5	2	118	6

== Honours ==
- Isobel Sneddon Young Player of the Year: 2018–19
