= Louis Moult =

English footballer (born 1992)

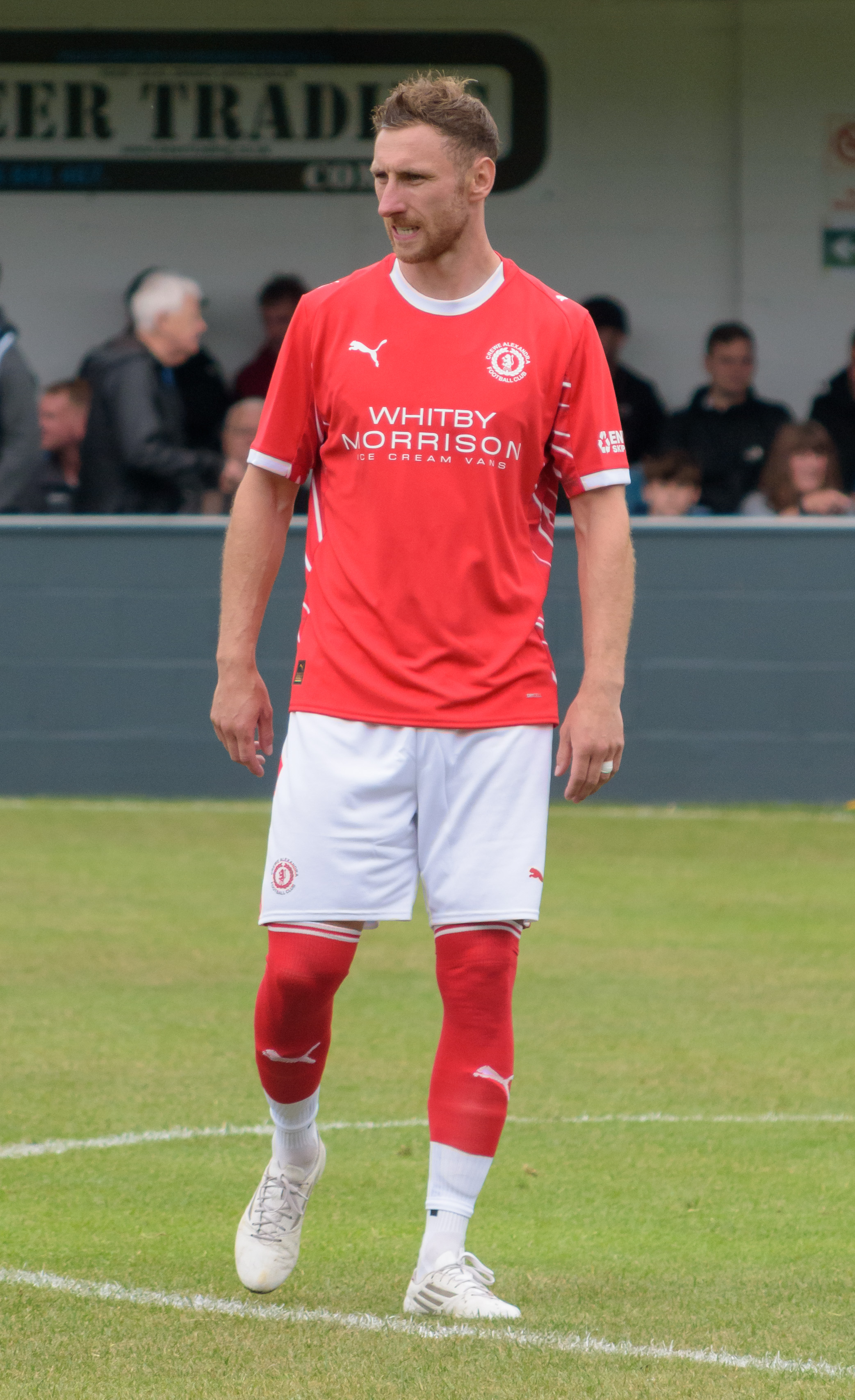
- Moult in 2025

Personal information
- Full name: Louis Elliot Moult
- Date of birth: 14 May 1992 (age 34)
- Place of birth: Stoke-on-Trent, England
- Height: 6 ft 0 in (1.83 m)
- Position: Striker

Team information
- Current team: Telford United
- Number: 31

Youth career
- 2000–2002: Stoke Arrows
- 2002–2009: Stoke City

Senior career*
Years	Team	Apps	(Gls)
2009–2012	Stoke City	1	(0)
2010	→ Bradford City (loan)	11	(1)
2011	→ Mansfield Town (loan)	3	(2)
2011	→ Accrington Stanley (loan)	4	(0)
2011	→ Mansfield Town (loan)	1	(0)
2012	→ Alfreton Town (loan)	1	(0)
2012–2013	Northampton Town	13	(1)
2013	→ Nuneaton Town (loan)	17	(1)
2013–2014	Nuneaton Town	43	(17)
2014–2015	Wrexham	39	(16)
2015–2018	Motherwell	84	(38)
2018–2021	Preston North End	36	(7)
2021–2023	Burton Albion	14	(1)
2022–2023	→ Motherwell (loan)	7	(1)
2023–2025	Dundee United	52	(21)
2025–2026	Crewe Alexandra	6	(0)
2026–	Telford United	2	(1)
- * Club domestic league appearances and goals as of 18:04, 17 August 2026 (BST)

Louis Elliot Moult (born 14 May 1992) is an English professional footballer who plays as a striker for Telford United.

Moult, a prolific goal scorer in Stoke City's academy and reserve side, appeared in a Premier League game in March 2010. After this Moult struggled to gain a place in the Stoke squad and was sent out on loan to Bradford City, Mansfield Town, Accrington Stanley and to Mansfield for a second time. He was released by Stoke in June 2012 and signed for Northampton Town. He subsequently played non-league football for Nuneaton Town and Wrexham, before moving to Scottish club Motherwell in 2015. He then joined Preston North End and Burton Albion before returning to Motherwell in September 2022. He signed for Crewe Alexandra in July 2025 on a one-year deal after his release from Dundee United.

== Career ==
=== Stoke City ===
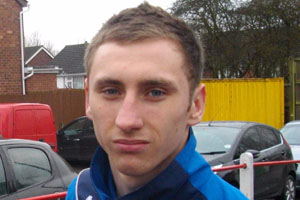
Moult in 2011.

Born in Stoke-on-Trent, Staffordshire, Moult joined Stoke's Academy from local youth club Stoke Arrows, and was a prolific goalscorer for the academy. After a number of impressive displays he started training with the first team and was also included in several reserve matches scoring against Fulham, Chelsea, Wolverhampton Wanderers and twice against West Ham United. He made his professional debut as a substitute on 12 August 2009 in a 1–0 League Cup win over Leyton Orient and followed this up by playing again in the cup against Portsmouth. He was involved in a League game squad for the first time on 10 March 2010 and made his league debut five minutes before the end of a 1–1 draw at Burnley. Moult earned praise from Stoke academy coach Adrian Pennock after his League debut.

Moult signed a professional contract with city on 19 March 2010. Moult joined Bradford City on a six-month loan on 30 July 2010 to gain valuable experience. He made his Bantams debut in a 3–1 defeat to Shrewsbury Town. Moult scored his first professional goal on 30 October 2010 against Oxford United when he beat Ryan Clarke in the final minute.

He returned to Stoke in January 2011 after his loan spell at Bradford ended. On 31 January 2011 he joined Conference National side Mansfield Town for on loan for a month. Moult made his Mansfield debut against Alfreton Town in the FA Trophy his brother Jake also played in the match for Alfreton. On his first league start for The Stags Moult scored twice in a 3–3 draw with Newport County. His loan was extended until April. However, after picking up a back injury Moult returned to Stoke in March.

Moult joined League Two Accrington Stanley on a months loan on 19 August 2011. He made five appearances for Stanley before returning to Stoke. He re-joined Mansfield Town on loan on 28 October 2011. He returned to Stoke after making just one substitute league appearance. On 12 January Moult linked up with his brother Jake, at Alfreton Town on a months loan. He made his Conference debut for Alfreton against Kidderminster Harriers on 21 January 2012 but was sent-off just before half time for a poor challenge on Harriers midfielder Kyle Storer. He returned to Stoke after the end of his loan spell. He left Stoke at the end of the 2011–12 season following the expiration of his contract.

=== Northampton Town ===
After a successful trial period where he scored twice in a pre-season match against Kettering Town, Moult signed a one-year contract with Northampton Town on 17 August 2012. Moult was handed the number 19 shirt and his first involvement was as an unused substitute against Rotherham. His debut came in a League Cup defeat to Wolverhampton Wanderers. His one and only goal for Northampton came in a game against Port Vale, Moult spoke afterwards saying "I was a massive Stoke fan so to get the goal today was absolutely fantastic, you dream of moments like that and the fact it's come against Port Vale makes it that bit sweeter." After making just 13 appearances in his first six months, mainly from the bench, Moult was loaned out to Nuneaton Town. He was released by Northampton at the end of the 2012–13 season, making 13 appearances scoring once.

=== Nuneaton Town ===
After a successful loan period in the later stages of the 2012–2013 season, Moult joined Conference Premier side Nuneaton Town in July 2013 on a permanent basis. Scoring just once in 17 appearances, manager Kevin Wilkin was confident of the striker's ability to score goals, which was proven when Moult scored eight goals in the opening nine league games. He made his debut against Macclesfield Town where he also scored the winning goal. He was linked with many clubs at the end of the 2013–2014 season, as Nuneaton had spent the majority of it in the play-offs, before manager Wilkin departed for league rivals Wrexham and the side slipped to 13th. At the end of the season the out of contract forward was linked heavily with a move to Wrexham, to re-join Kevin Wilkin and former teammate Wes York, who had opted for the move to North Wales.

=== Wrexham ===
After weeks of speculation, Moult signed for Wrexham on a one-year deal on 30 June. He re-joined former manager Kevin Wilkin as well as Nuneaton teammate Wes York. After a day in pre-season training, manager Wilkin set the bar for Moult to score 20 goals in the coming season 2014–15 season. He scored 23 goals in 37 starts in his only season with Wrexham.

=== Motherwell ===
Moult moved to Scottish Premiership club Motherwell in June 2015, with Motherwell paying Wrexham an undisclosed transfer fee. He made his debut on 1 August 2015, in a 1–0 win against Inverness Caledonian Thistle. On 22 August 2015, he scored his first goal for Motherwell, in a 2–1 defeat away to St Johnstone.

Ahead of the 2016–17 season, Moult revealed he had been playing with a groin injury for some time. Following an away match against Annan Athletic in the Scottish League Cup on 23 July 2016, in which he scored twice in a 3–1 win, Moult underwent surgery on the injury. He scored on his return to the team as Motherwell drew 1–1 away to Ross County on 10 September 2016. In the following match, he scored four times as Motherwell won 4–2 against Hamilton Academical in the Lanarkshire derby.

On 10 October 2017, Moult was named as Scottish Premiership Player of the month for September. On 22 October 2017, he scored twice as Motherwell defeated Rangers 2–0 in the semi-final of the Scottish League Cup.

=== Preston North End ===
It was disclosed on 14 December 2017 that Motherwell had agreed to sell Moult to EFL Championship side Preston North End, with effect from 1 January 2018. He made his debut for the club on 20 January 2018, as a substitute in a 1–1 draw at home to Birmingham City, with his first goal coming in a 4–1 defeat to Sheffield Wednesday on 30 March 2018.

On 17 August 2019, Moult suffered a knee injury in the first half of Preston's match away to Swansea City, with manager Alex Neil confirming in the following days that he had injured his cruciate ligament and was set to miss the remainder of the season.

On 5 April 2021, Moult returned to the Preston North End first-team matchday squad for the first time since August 2019 as an unused substitute in their 1–0 away win against Swansea City.

Moult was released by Preston at the end of the 2020–21 season.

=== Burton Albion ===
Following his release from Preston, Moult joined Burton Albion on a two-year contract. Moult scored his only Burton Albion goal in a 3–2 comeback win against Fleetwood Town.

==== Motherwell loan ====
On 2 September 2022, Moult returned to Motherwell on a season-long loan deal from Burton. On 6 November 2022 Moult scored his first goal since his return for Motherwell in a 3–2 defeat against Hearts. Moult had his loan at Motherwell terminated early on 6 January 2023 due to injury.

=== Dundee United ===
On 18 July 2023, Moult joined Scottish Championship club Dundee United on a one-year deal. He received a Man of The Match award on his debut, after assisting 3 and scoring 1.

=== Crewe Alexandra ===
On 24 July 2025, Moult joined EFL League 2 club Crewe Alexandra on a one-year deal with an option for a further 12 months. He had trained with the club since his release from Dundee United. He made his debut in Crewe's 3–1 victory at Salford City on 2 August 2025. On 2 September 2025, Moult scored his first Crewe goal as the side beat Chesterfield 7–1 in their opening tie in the EFL Trophy group stage.

On 13 May 2026, Crewe said he would be released in the summer when his contract expired.

== Personal life ==
Moult was born ten minutes away from Burslem in Stoke, and has an older brother, Jake. He grew up as a Stoke City fan. He attended Sir John Offley Primary in Madeley and Madeley High School. When he was 15 years old his mother Vicky died leaving him with his dad Arthur and brother Jake. His brother works at Stoke's academy as an under 12s and under 7s coach, and also plays for Altrincham, having previously been at Plymouth Argyle, Port Vale, Kidderminster Harriers, Leek Town and Stafford Rangers.

== Career statistics ==
As of match played 6 September 2025

Appearances and goals by club, season and competition
Club	Season	League			National Cup		League Cup		Other		Total	
Club	Season	Division	Apps	Goals	Apps	Goals	Apps	Goals	Apps	Goals	Apps	Goals
Stoke City	2009–10	Premier League	1	0	0	0	2	0	—		3	0
Stoke City	2010–11	Premier League	0	0	0	0	0	0	—		0	0
Stoke City	2011–12	Premier League	0	0	0	0	0	0	—		0	0
Stoke City	Total		1	0	0	0	2	0	—		3	0
Bradford City (loan)	2010–11	League Two	11	1	1	0	2	0	1 (Note: Appearances in the Football League Trophy)	0	15	1
Mansfield Town (loan)	2010–11	Conference Premier	3	2	0	0	—		3 (Note: Appearances in the FA Trophy)	0	6	2
Accrington Stanley (loan)	2011–12	League Two	4	0	0	0	0	0	1	0	5	0
Mansfield Town (loan)	2011–12	Conference Premier	1	0	1	0	—		0	0	2	0
Alfreton Town (loan)	2011–12	Conference Premier	1	0	0	0	—		1	1	2	1
Northampton Town	2012–13	League Two	13	1	1	1	1	0	2	0	17	2
Nuneaton Town (loan)	2012–13	Conference Premier	17	1	0	0	—		0	0	17	1
Nuneaton Town	2013–14	Conference Premier	43	17	0	0	—		0	0	43	17
Wrexham	2014–15	Conference Premier	39	16	3	0	—		9	7	51	23
Motherwell	2015–16	Scottish Premiership	38	15	2	1	2	2	—		42	18
Motherwell	2016–17	Scottish Premiership	31	15	1	1	2	2	—		34	18
Motherwell	2017–18	Scottish Premiership	15	8	0	0	7	6	—		22	14
Motherwell	Total		84	38	3	2	11	10	0	0	98	50
Preston North End	2017–18	Championship	10	2	1	0	0	0	—		11	2
Preston North End	2018–19	Championship	24	4	0	0	3	1	—		27	5
Preston North End	2019–20	Championship	2	1	0	0	0	0	—		2	1
Preston North End	2020–21	Championship	0	0	0	0	0	0	—		0	0
Preston North End	Total		36	7	1	0	3	1	0	0	40	8
Burton Albion	2021–22	League One	10	1	0	0	0	0	0	0	10	1
Burton Albion	2022–23	League One	4	0	0	0	0	1	0	0	4	0
Burton Albion	Total		14	1	0	0	1	0	0	0	14	1
Motherwell (loan)	2022–23	Scottish Premiership	7	1	0	0	0	0	—		7	1
Dundee United	2023–24	Scottish Championship	33	18	1	0	2	1	3 (Note: Appearances in the Scottish Challenge Cup)	1	39	20
Dundee United	2024–25	Scottish Premiership	8	1	0	0	6	2	—		14	3
Dundee United	Total		41	19	1	0	8	3	3	1	53	23
Crewe Alexandra	2025–26	League Two	5	0	0	0	0	0	1	1	6	1
Career total			306	97	10	3	26	13	21	10	363	123

== Honours ==
Wrexham

- FA Trophy runner-up: 2014–15

Individual

- Stoke City Academy Player of the Year: 2010
- Scottish Premiership Player of the Month: September 2017
