= Jack Newman (footballer) =

Scottish goalkeeper

Personal information
- Full name: Jack Callum Newman
- Date of birth: 12 February 2002 (age 24)
- Place of birth: Hexham, England
- Position: Goalkeeper

Team information
- Current team: Peterhead
- Number: 1

Youth career
- Stocksfield
- Prudhoe Town
- 2012–2018: Sunderland

Senior career*
Years	Team	Apps	(Gls)
2018–2020	Sunderland	0	(0)
2019	→ Chester Le-Street Town (loan)	3	(0)
2020–2025	Dundee United	4	(0)
2021	→ The Spartans (loan)	5	(0)
2022	→ The Spartans (loan)	11	(0)
2022	→ Peterhead (loan)	8	(0)
2024	→ Inverness Caledonian Thistle (Loan)	2	(0)
2025	→ Livingston (loan)	0	(0)
2025–	Peterhead	36	(0)

International career
2016–2017	Scotland U15	1	(0)
2017–2018	Scotland U16	5	(0)
2018–2019	Scotland U17	2	(0)
2019	Scotland U18	2	(0)
2023-	Scotland U21	2	(0)
- * Club domestic league appearances and goals as of 4 May 2026

Jack Callum Newman (born 12 February 2002) is a Scottish ex-youth internationalist footballer who plays as a goalkeeper for Peterhead.

== Early life ==
Jack Newman was born in Hexham on 12 February 2002. He grew up Stocksfield, but went to neighbouring Prudhoe Community High School. He began playing for Stocksfield Football Club at the age of 6 until the age of 12 where he joined Prudhoe Youth Club FC playing for both sides. A year later he was picked up by Premier League outfit Sunderland where he progressed through their academy.

== Club career ==
=== Sunderland ===
After progressing through the Academy of Light at Sunderland, highly rated by many. Newman signed his first contract with the club. He was the only first year scholar to be in the starting lineup for the beginning of the under-18 Premier League North 2018-19 campaign against Liverpool. After impressing early on Newman suffering an injury and returned in a 2-2 away draw against Stoke City in February 2019. In January 2019 he was sent on loan to local Northern League Division 2 side Chester Le-Street Town on a one-month loan.

In the following season Newman was again a regular starter for the under-18 side continuing with regular International recognition. Newman's final game was a 3-1 loss to Newcastle United in March 2020. The following week it was announced he would leave the club after a mass clear out at the Stadium of Light seeing 27 players leave the club.

=== Dundee United ===
==== 2020–21 ====
On 10 July 2020, it was announced that Newman had signed for Scottish Premiership side Dundee United after spending pre-season with the Tangerines, putting pen to paper on a two-year deal.

In early February 2021, Newman suffered a knee injury requiring surgery and was sidelined for the rest of the season. In March 2021, despite being injured he signed a new deal at the club till 2023.

==== 2021–22 ====
In September 2021 Newman was loaned to Lowland League side The Spartans. In two loan spells over the season he played 16 games and picked up the "Man of the Match" award five times.

==== 2022–23 ====
In July 2022 Newman signed on loan for Peterhead and the next day played his first game against Aberdeen in the Premier Sports Cup, picking up "Man of the Match" again on debut. Newman was recalled to United on the 31st of August ending his time at Balmoor.

Newman made his competitive debut for Dundee United in a 2-1 loss to St.Johnstone at home in February 2023, coming on as a substitute for injured Mark Birighitti. A week later he made his full debut in a 4-0 loss to Ross County away in Dingwall.

After a couple of solid performances towards the end of the season Newman signed a new 2 year deal in June 2023 extending his time at Tannadice until 2025.

==== 2024–25 ====
Newman signed for Livingston on loan in January 2025. The loan lasted only a couple of weeks as he picked up an injury before playing a game, and the loan was cut short.

=== Peterhead ===
In June 2025, Newman signed for Peterhead on a one year deal.

== International career ==
Newman is eligible to represent Scotland due to his Grandfather being born and raised in Glasgow. He made his international debut in a under 16 UEFA Development Tournament against England in a 2-1 win which he saved a penalty. He has since been capped at under 17 and under 18 level. He featured on the bench in an under 19 international friendly game against England in September 2020 which was abruptly stopped when it was revealed one of the Scottish coaches had tested positive for coronavirus.

Newman was called up to Scott Gemmill's Scotland U21 squad in March 2023 and made his debut vs Wales in a 3-0 loss at the Penitar Arena in Spain.
