= Chris Mochrie =

Scottish association football player

Personal information
- Full name: Christopher Robert Mochrie
- Date of birth: 7 April 2003 (age 23)
- Place of birth: Dundee, Scotland
- Height: 5 ft 11 in (1.80 m)
- Position: Attacking midfielder

Team information
- Current team: St Mirren
- Number: 23

Youth career
- Logie Harp Boys Club
- Dundee United

Senior career*
Years	Team	Apps	(Gls)
2019–2024	Dundee United	38	(3)
2020–2021	→ Montrose (loan)	21	(1)
2022–2023	→ Dunfermline Athletic (loan)	34	(2)
2024–2026	Airdrieonians	66	(11)
2026-	St Mirren	4	(0)

International career^{‡}
2018–2019	Scotland U16	7	(1)
2019–2020	Scotland U17	4	(1)
2021-2022	Scotland U19	4	(0)
2022-	Scotland U21	2	(0)
- * Club domestic league appearances and goals as of 4 May 2026 ‡ National team caps and goals as of 21:12, 23 April 2024 (UTC)

Christopher Robert Mochrie (born 7 April 2003) is a Scottish footballer who plays as an attacking midfielder for Scottish Premiership club St Mirren. He holds the record as the youngest player to appear for the Dundee United first team after making his debut in 2019.

== Playing career ==
=== Club ===
Born in Dundee, Mochrie played for Logie Harp Boys Club before joining the Dundee United Academy. He also attended the Scottish Football Association Performance School programme based at St John's Roman Catholic High School. He became Dundee United's youngest ever first team player when making his debut as a substitute against Greenock Morton in May 2019, aged 16 years and 27 days. (Note: The previous record of 16 years and 99 days had been set by John Souttar in 2013.)

In October 2020, Mochrie joined Scottish League One side Montrose on loan. He was recalled by United when lower league football was suspended in January 2021, but returned to Montrose when the suspension was lifted in March.

Mochrie scored his first goal for Dundee United on 14 July 2021, in a 6–1 win over Elgin City in the Scottish League Cup. He made his Scottish Premiership debut and first league start against Heart of Midlothian the following month.

In August 2022 Mochrie joined Dunfermline Athletic on a season long loan, helping the Pars win the League One title.

Mochrie made 30 appearances for Dundee United in the 2023/2024 season, scoring three goals. This included the winning goal against Ayr United on 20 April 2024 to "all but [seal] promotion" back to the top flight of Scottish football.

Mochrie signed with Airdrieonians in July 2024 after being released by Dundee United.

Mochrie signed with St Mirren FC in July 2026 on a 2 year deal

=== International ===
Mochrie was called up to the Scotland under-16 squad in August 2018. He scored Scotland's goal in a 1–1 draw against Northern Ireland in the Victory Shield in November 2018. After being involved in a training camp in August 2019, he made a scoring debut for Scotland under-17s in a 2–0 win against Armenia in October 2019. He was called up to the under-21 squad for the first time in August 2021.

== Career statistics ==
As of match played 26 April 2024

Appearances and goals by club, season and competition
Club	Season	League			Scottish Cup		League Cup		Other		Total	
Club	Season	Division	Apps	Goals	Apps	Goals	Apps	Goals	Apps	Goals	Apps	Goals
Dundee United	2018–19	Scottish Championship	1	0	0	0	0	0	0	0	1	0
Dundee United	2019–20	Scottish Championship	4	0	0	0	1	0	0	0	5	0
Dundee United	2020–21	Scottish Premiership	0	0	0	0	1	0	0	0	1	0
Dundee United	2021–22	Scottish Premiership	9	0	0	0	5	1	1	0	15	1
Dundee United	2023–24	Scottish Championship	24	3	1	0	3	0	2	0	30	3
Dundee United	Total		38	3	1	0	10	1	3	0	51	4
Montrose (loan)	2020–21	Scottish League One	20	1	3	1	0	0	1 (Note: Appearances in the Scottish Championship play-offs)	0	24	2
Dunfermline Athletic (loan)	2022–23	Scottish League One	34	2	2	0	0	0	0	0	36	2
Airdrieonians	2024–25	Scottish Championship	33	7	3	1	5	0	6	2	47	10
Airdrieonians	2025-26	Scottish Championship	33	4	3	1	4	1	6	1	48	7
Airdrieonians	Total		66	11	6	2	9	1	12	3	93	17
Career total			158	17	12	3	19	2	14	3	206	25

== Honours ==
Dundee United

- Scottish Championship: 2019-2020

Dunfermline Athletic

- Scottish League One: 2022–23
