= Darren Watson (footballer) =

Scottish footballer

Personal information
- Date of birth: 10 August 2003 (age 23)
- Place of birth: Methilhill, Fife, Scotland
- Height: 1.77 m (5 ft 10 in)
- Position: Forward

Team information
- Current team: Broughty Athletic

Youth career
- Kennoway
- Fife Elite Football Academy
- 2015–2020: Dundee United

Senior career*
Years	Team	Apps	(Gls)
2016–2023	Dundee United	7	(0)
2022	→ East Fife (loan)	5	(0)
2023	→ Forfar Athletic (loan)	6	(0)
2023–2024	Forfar Athletic	15	(0)
2024-	Broughty Athletic	8	(11)

International career^{‡}
2019	Scotland U16	1	(0)
- * Club domestic league appearances and goals as of 4 May 2024 ‡ National team caps and goals as of 7 January 2021 (UTC)

Darren Watson (born 10 August 2003) is a Scottish professional footballer who plays as a forward.

== Early life ==
Watson was born in Scotland on 10 August 2003, he attended Methilhill Primary School, Methilhill, Fife before switching to St Johns Academy and was given a contract at Dundee United.

== Club career ==
Watson began his career playing youth football for Kennoway FC and at the Fife Elite Football Academy. He joined the youth academy of Dundee United in 2015, signing his first professional contract in May 2019. Watson made his debut for the club against Rangers in the Scottish Premiership on 13 December 2020. He started the game on the bench, coming on as a substitute for Adrián Spörle in the 86th minute of the game, as the match ended in a 2–1 defeat for Dundee United.

On 28 January 2022, Watson joined Scottish League One side East Fife on loan for the remainder of the 2021–22 season. Darren returned to his parent club Dundee United due to an injury that cut short his loan stay at the Methil outfits.

In June 2023, following his release from Dundee United, Watson signed with Scottish League Two club Forfar Athletic following a short loan spell the previous season.

== International career ==
Watson has represented Scotland at under-16. He played his first match against Australia U16 on 24 January 2019, as a half time substitute for Aaron Lyall. The match ended 3–2 in favour of Scotland.

== Career statistics ==
As of 15 August 2021

Appearances and goals by club, season and competition
Club	Season	League			National Cup		League Cup		Other		Total	
Club	Season	Division	Apps	Goals	Apps	Goals	Apps	Goals	Apps	Goals	Apps	Goals
Dundee United	2020–21	Scottish Premiership	1	0	0	0	0	0	0	0	1	0
Dundee United	2021–22	Scottish Premiership	1	0	0	0	2	0	0	0	3	0
Dundee United	Total		2	0	0	0	2	0	0	0	4	0
Dundee United B	2021–22		—						1 (Note: Appearances in the Scottish Challenge Cup, in which age-restricted teams from the Scottish Premiership clubs compete against senior clubs)	0	1	0
Career total			2	0	0	0	2	0	1	0	5	0
