= Craig Moore (footballer, born 2005) =

Scottish footballer (born 2005)

Personal information
- Date of birth: 21 September 2005 (age 21)
- Place of birth: Arbroath, Scotland
- Position: Midfielder

Youth career
- -2015: Arbroath Lads Club
- 2015–2023: Dundee United

Senior career*
Years	Team	Apps	(Gls)
2021–2024	Dundee United	1	(0)
2023–2024	→ Brechin City (loan)	1	(0)
2024	→ Lochee United (loan)	0	(0)

International career^{‡}
2021–2022	Scotland U17	7	(1)
2022	Scotland U18	2	(0)
- * Club domestic league appearances and goals as of 26 October 2024 ‡ National team caps and goals as of 23 September 2022

Craig Moore (born 21 September 2005) is a Scottish professional footballer. He played for Dundee United, and also had loan spells at Brechin City and Lochee United.

== Club career ==
Craig Moore made his professional debut for Dundee United on 18 December 2021, starting in the 1–0 away Scottish Premiership loss to Rangers, the reigning champions. Having celebrated his sixteenth birthday only a few months before, he became the youngest ever footballer to start a competitive match for United, surpassing John Souttar's previous record.

== International career ==
Moore is a youth international for Scotland, having played with the county's under-17.

== Personal life ==
Craig is the brother of fellow footballer, and former Dundee player, Callum Moore.
