= 2023–24 Scottish Championship =

Scottish Championship
- Season: 2023–24
- Dates: 4 August 2023 – 3 May 2024
- Champions: Dundee United
- Promoted: Dundee United
- Relegated: Inverness Caledonian Thistle (via play-offs); Arbroath
- Matches: 180
- Goals: 503 (2.79 per match)
- Top goalscorer: Brian Graham; 20 goals
- Biggest home win: Dundee United 6–0 Arbroath (27 October 2023); Queen's Park 6–0 Arbroath (27 February 2024)
- Biggest away win: Partick Thistle 0–5 Dundee United (21 October 2023); Dunfermline Athletic 0–5 Greenock Morton (3 February 2024); Queen's Park 0–5 Dundee United (6 April 2024); Arbroath 0–5 Queen's Park (27 April 2024)
- Highest scoring: Raith Rovers 4–4 Ayr United (22 December 2023)
- Longest winning run: Raith Rovers; 5 games
- Longest unbeaten run: Dundee United; 14 games
- Longest winless run: Queen's Park; 15 games
- Longest losing run: Arbroath; 10 games
- Highest attendance: 11,802; Dundee United 4–1 Partick Thistle (3 May 2024)
- Lowest attendance: 916; Queen's Park 2–1 Arbroath (12 August 2023)
- Total attendance: 607,497
- Average attendance: 3,374
- All statistics correct as of 3 May 2024.

The 2023–24 Scottish Championship (known as cinch Championship for sponsorship reasons) was the eleventh season of the Scottish Championship, the second tier of Scottish football. The season began on 4 August 2023.

Ten teams contested the league: Airdrieonians, Arbroath, Ayr United, Dundee United, Dunfermline Athletic, Greenock Morton, Inverness Caledonian Thistle, Partick Thistle, Queen's Park and Raith Rovers.

== Teams ==
The following teams changed division after the 2022–23 season.

=== To Championship ===
Promoted from League One

- Airdrieonians
- Dunfermline Athletic

Relegated from the Premiership

- Dundee United

=== From Championship ===
Relegated to League One

- Cove Rangers
- Hamilton Academical

Promoted to the Premiership

- Dundee

=== Stadia and locations ===
Airdrieonians	Arbroath	Ayr United	Dundee United
Excelsior Stadium	Gayfield Park	Somerset Park	Tannadice Park
Capacity: 10,101	Capacity: 6,600	Capacity: 10,185	Capacity: 14,223
Dunfermline Athletic	Location of teams in 2023–24 Scottish Championship		Greenock Morton
East End Park	Location of teams in 2023–24 Scottish Championship		Cappielow
Capacity: 11,480	Location of teams in 2023–24 Scottish Championship		Capacity: 11,589
Inverness Caledonian Thistle	Partick Thistle	Queen's Park	Raith Rovers
Caledonian Stadium	Firhill Stadium	Hampden Park	Stark's Park
Capacity: 7,512	Capacity: 10,887	Capacity: 51,866	Capacity: 8,867

Championship football clubs in Glasgow

=== Personnel and kits ===
Team	Manager	Captain	Kit manufacturer	Shirt sponsor
Airdrieonians	(Scotland) Rhys McCabe	(Scotland) Adam Frizzell	Joma	Holemasters
Arbroath	(Scotland) Jim McIntyre	(Scotland) Thomas O'Brien	Macron	Megatech
Ayr United	(Scotland) Scott Brown	(Republic of Ireland) Sean McGinty	O'Neills	Jewson (Home); Lindsay Mortgage Services (Away)
Dundee United	(Republic of Ireland) Jim Goodwin	(Scotland) Ross Docherty	Erreà	Bartercard
Dunfermline Athletic	(Northern Ireland) James McPake	(Scotland) Kyle Benedictus	Erreà	SRJ Windows
Greenock Morton	(Scotland) Dougie Imrie	(Scotland) Grant Gillespie	Joma	Dalrada Technology (Home); Erskine (Away); Team Talk (3rd)
Inverness Caledonian Thistle	(Scotland) Duncan Ferguson	(Northern Ireland) Billy Mckay	Puma	ILI Group
Partick Thistle	(Scotland) Kris Doolan	(Scotland) Brian Graham	O'Neills	Clydebuilt Home Improvements
Queen's Park	(Scotland) Callum Davidson	(Scotland) Jack Thomson	Adidas	City Facilities Management
Raith Rovers	(Scotland) Ian Murray	(Scotland) Scott Brown	Joma	Dean Park Hotel (Home); Fife Letting Service (Away)

=== Managerial changes ===
Team	Outgoing manager	Manner of departure	Date of vacancy	Position in table	Incoming manager	Date of appointment
Queen's Park	(Republic of Ireland) Owen Coyle	Resigned	15 May 2023	Pre-season	(Netherlands) Robin Veldman	17 June 2023
Inverness Caledonian Thistle	(Scotland) Billy Dodds	Sacked	17 September 2023	10th	(Scotland) Duncan Ferguson	26 September 2023
Arbroath	(Scotland) Dick Campbell	Resigned	25 November 2023	9th	(Scotland) Jim McIntyre	4 December 2023
Queen's Park	(Netherlands) Robin Veldman	Sacked	9 December 2023	8th	(Scotland) Callum Davidson	9 January 2024
Ayr United	(Scotland) Lee Bullen	Sacked	15 January 2024	9th	(Scotland) Scott Brown	23 January 2024

== League table ==
Pos	Team	Pld	W	D	L	GF	GA	GD	Pts	Promotion, qualification or relegation
1	Dundee United (C, P)	36	22	9	5	73	23	+50	75	Promotion to the Premiership
2	Raith Rovers	36	20	9	7	58	42	+16	69	Qualification for the Premiership play-off semi-final
3	Partick Thistle	36	14	13	9	63	54	+9	55	Qualification for the Premiership play-off quarter-final
4	Airdrieonians	36	15	7	14	44	44	0	52	Qualification for the Premiership play-off quarter-final
5	Greenock Morton	36	12	9	15	43	46	−3	45	
6	Dunfermline Athletic	36	11	12	13	43	48	−5	45	
7	Ayr United	36	12	8	16	53	61	−8	44	
8	Queen's Park	36	11	10	15	50	56	−6	43	
9	Inverness Caledonian Thistle (R)	36	10	12	14	41	40	+1	42	Qualification for the Championship play-offs
10	Arbroath (R)	36	6	5	25	35	89	−54	23	Relegation to League One

Rules for classification: 1) Points; 2) Goal difference; 3) Goals scored; 4) Head-to-to head points; 5) Head-to-head goal difference; 6) Play-off (only for deciding promotion, play-off participation and relegation).
(C) Champions; (P) Promoted; (R) Relegated

== Results ==
Teams play each other four times, twice in the first half of the season (home and away) and twice in the second half of the season (home and away), making a total of 180 games, with each team playing 36.

=== First half of season (Matches 1–18) ===
Home \ Away	AIR	ARB	AYR	DUN	DNF	GMO	ICT	PAR	QPA	RAI
Airdrieonians	—	2–0	1–2	0–2	1–2	0–0	2–1	2–1	1–1	1–0
Arbroath	4–0	—	2–1	0–4	1–1	1–2	2–3	1–3	0–1	1–2
Ayr United	1–0	2–0	—	0–3	2–2	0–1	1–0	0–4	2–2	1–2
Dundee United	2–0	6–0	1–0	—	1–1	1–1	1–1	3–0	4–1	0–1
Dunfermline Athletic	2–1	3–0	0–1	1–2	—	3–1	1–1	1–2	0–3	0–1
Greenock Morton	0–1	0–3	3–1	0–1	1–2	—	2–1	1–4	1–0	1–2
Inverness Caledonian Thistle	1–0	1–2	3–1	0–1	1–1	0–0	—	0–0	1–2	1–2
Partick Thistle	2–1	0–3	2–2	0–5	3–0	2–1	1–1	—	3–1	2–2
Queen's Park	1–2	2–1	2–5	0–0	0–2	0–0	1–4	2–2	—	2–3
Raith Rovers	1–1	2–2	4–4	1–1	1–0	3–2	1–0	4–3	3–2	—

Legend: Blue = home team win; Yellow = draw; Red = away team win.

=== Second half of season (Matches 19–36) ===
Home \ Away	AIR	ARB	AYR	DUN	DNF	GMO	ICT	PAR	QPA	RAI
Airdrieonians	—	5–2	2–3	0–0	2–1	3–1	2–0	1–1	1–1	1–0
Arbroath	1–2	—	0–0	0–3	2–3	1–2	1–1	0–1	0–5	3–2
Ayr United	2–1	5–0	—	1–2	3–3	1–1	1–3	4–3	1–2	1–2
Dundee United	0–2	4–0	1–0	—	0–0	2–3	1–1	4–1	3–1	2–0
Dunfermline Athletic	0–2	1–1	2–0	3–1	—	0–5	1–1	1–1	0–0	1–2
Greenock Morton	2–1	3–0	3–0	1–4	0–1	—	0–2	1–1	2–0	0–0
Inverness Caledonian Thistle	0–0	2–1	1–2	0–1	0–0	3–1	—	3–3	0–1	0–1
Partick Thistle	4–0	4–0	0–0	1–1	1–3	2–1	1–0	—	3–2	0–1
Queen's Park	2–0	6–0	1–2	0–5	2–1	0–0	0–1	2–2	—	0–0
Raith Rovers	1–3	5–0	2–1	2–1	2–0	0–0	2–3	0–0	1–2	—

Legend: Blue = home team win; Yellow = draw; Red = away team win.

== Season statistics ==
=== Scoring ===
==== Top scorers ====
Rank	Player	Club	Goals
1	(Scotland) Brian Graham	Partick Thistle	20
2	(England) Louis Moult	Dundee United	18
3	(Republic of Ireland) Ruari Paton	Queen's Park	17
4	(Scotland) Lewis Vaughan	Raith Rovers	15
5	(Scotland) Anton Dowds	Ayr United	13
5	(Scotland) Tony Watt	Dundee United	13

== Awards ==
Month	Manager of the Month		Player of the Month	
Month	Manager	Club	Player	Club
August	(Netherlands) Robin Veldman	Queen's Park	(Republic of Ireland) Ruari Paton	Queen's Park
September	(Republic of Ireland) Jim Goodwin	Dundee United	(England) Jermaine Hylton	Arbroath
October	(Republic of Ireland) Jim Goodwin	Dundee United	(Scotland) Kai Fotheringham	Dundee United
November	(Scotland) Duncan Ferguson	Inverness CT	(Canada) David Wotherspoon	Inverness CT
December	(Scotland) Ian Murray	Raith Rovers	(Scotland) Lewis Vaughan	Raith Rovers
January	(Scotland) Dougie Imrie	Greenock Morton	(England) George Oakley	Greenock Morton
February	(Scotland) Dougie Imrie	Greenock Morton	(Scotland) Dom Thomas	Queen's Park
March	(Northern Ireland) James McPake	Dunfermline Athletic	(England) Louis Moult	Dundee United
April	(Republic of Ireland) Jim Goodwin	Dundee United	(Scotland) Brian Graham	Partick Thistle

The SPFL Championship manager of the year was Jim Goodwin of Dundee United.

The SPFL Championship player of the year was Louis Moult of Dundee United.

== Championship play-offs ==
=== Bracket ===
Semi-finals
1	Inverness Caledonian Thistle	0	1	1
4	Montrose	0	0	0
3	Alloa Athletic	2	2	4
2	Hamilton Academical	2	3	5

Final
Inverness Caledonian Thistle	1	2	3
Hamilton Academical	2	3	5

=== Semi-finals ===
==== First leg ====
7 May 2024	Montrose	0–0	Inverness Caledonian Thistle	Montrose
19:45				Stadium: Links Park; Attendance: 1,043; Referee: Chris Graham

7 May 2024	Alloa Athletic	2–2	Hamilton Academical	Alloa
19:45	Steven 47'; Roberts 54'		Henderson 31'; O'Hara 75'	Stadium: Recreation Park; Attendance: 1,077; Referee: Craig Napier

==== Second leg ====
11 May 2024	Inverness Caledonian Thistle	1–0 (1–0 agg.)	Montrose	Inverness
15:00	McKay 59'			Stadium: Caledonian Stadium; Attendance: 2,089; Referee: Alan Muir

11 May 2024	Hamilton Academical	3–2 (5–4 agg.)	Alloa Athletic	Hamilton
15:00	Tumilty 18'; L.Smith 43'; Rose 77'		Coulson 7'; Sammon 57'	Stadium: New Douglas Park; Attendance: 1,027; Referee: Steven Kirkland

=== Final ===
==== First leg ====
15 May 2024	Hamilton Academical	2–1	Inverness Caledonian Thistle	Hamilton
20:05	O'Hara 6'; Owens 22'		Pepple 68'	Stadium: New Douglas Park; Attendance: 1,389; Referee: Graham Grainger

==== Second leg ====
18 May 2024	Inverness Caledonian Thistle	2–3 (3–5 agg.)	Hamilton Academical	Inverness
17:30	Kerr 31'; Samuel 90+9'		O'Hara 8', 41' (pen.); Smith 12'	Stadium: Caledonian Stadium; Attendance: 2,873; Referee: Euan Anderson

== Attendances ==
Dundee United drew the highest average home attendance in the 2023-24 edition of the Scottish Championship.

#	Football club	Home games	Average attendance
1	Dundee United	18	8,408
2	Dunfermline Athletic	18	5,444
3	Raith Rovers	18	4,191
4	Partick Thistle	18	3,517
5	Inverness Caledonian Thistle	18	2,289
6	Ayr United	18	2,114
7	Greenock Morton	18	2,061
8	Arbroath FC	18	1,972
9	Airdieonians FC	18	1,934
10	Queen's Park FC	18	1,839
