= List of Scottish football transfers summer 2025 =

This is a list of Scottish football transfers, featuring at least one 2025–26 Scottish Premiership club or one 2025–26 Scottish Championship club, which were completed during the summer 2025 transfer window. In a change from previous summers an additional transfer window was created between 1 June and 10 June, allowing clubs involved in the 2025 FIFA Club World Cup to register players. The main window was open from 16 June to 1 September.

== List ==
Date	Name	Moving from	Moving to	Fee
7 May 2025	Victor Wanyama	Dunfermline Athletic	Free agent	Free
7 May 2025	Omar Taylor-Clarke	Dunfermline Athletic	Free agent	Free
9 May 2025	Craig Wighton	Dunfermline Athletic	Montrose	Free
9 May 2025	Innes Murray	Arbroath	Kelty Hearts	Free
16 May 2025	Kieran McKechnie	Arbroath	Crusaders	Free
19 May 2025	Barry Douglas	St Johnstone	Free agent	Free
19 May 2025	Max Kucheriavyi	St Johnstone	Free agent	Free
20 May 2025	David Babunski	Dundee United	Vardar	Free
22 May 2025	Gallagher Lennon	St Mirren	Free agent	Free
24 May 2025	Connall Ewan	Ross County	Elgin City	Free
26 May 2025	Sean Welsh	Queen's Park	The Spartans	Free
28 May 2025	Mark Ferrie	Motherwell	Free agent	Free
28 May 2025	Scott Allardice	Ross County	Free agent	Free
28 May 2025	Logan Sinclair	Falkirk	Free agent	Free
29 May 2025	Dwight Gayle	Hibernian	Retired	Free
29 May 2025	Reuben McAllister	Hibernian	Free agent	Free
29 May 2025	Murray Aiken	Hibernian	Free agent	Free
30 May 2025	Josh Hinds	Queen's Park	Free agent	Free
30 May 2025	Max Thompson	Queen's Park	Chorley	Free
30 May 2025	Lewis Reid	Queen's Park	Stranraer	Free
30 May 2025	Jack MacKenzie	Aberdeen	Plymouth Argyle	Free
31 May 2025	Oisin McEntee	Walsall	Heart of Midlothian	Free
31 May 2025	Billy King	Arbroath	Bonnyrigg Rose	Free
1 June 2025	Matthew Clarke	Livingston	Ballymena United	Free
1 June 2025	Jordan Allan	Falkirk	Queen of the South	Free
1 June 2025	Jamie McGrath	Aberdeen	Hibernian	Free
1 June 2025	Nick Suman	Cove Rangers	Aberdeen	Free
1 June 2025	Killian Phillips	Crystal Palace	St Mirren	Undisclosed
1 June 2025	Roland Idowu	Shrewsbury Town	St Mirren	Undisclosed
1 June 2025	Elton Kabangu	Union SG	Heart of Midlothian	£250,000
1 June 2025	Christian Borchgrevink	Vålerenga	Heart of Midlothian	Undisclosed
1 June 2025	Alexandros Kyziridis	Zemplin Michalovce	Heart of Midlothian	Free
1 June 2025	Ianis Hagi	Rangers	Free agent	Free
1 June 2025	Tom Lawrence	Rangers	Free agent	Free
1 June 2025	Lyall Cameron	Dundee	Rangers	Compensation
1 June 2025	Óscar Cortés	Lens	Rangers	£4,500,000
1 June 2025	Bobby Wales	Kilmarnock	Swansea City	Compensation
1 June 2025	Innes Cameron	Kilmarnock	Barrow	Free
1 June 2025	Craig Ross	Stranraer	Airdrieonians	Free
1 June 2025	Jack Baird	Greenock Morton	St Johnstone	Free
1 June 2025	Morgan Boyes	Greenock Morton	St Johnstone	Free
1 June 2025	Jamie Gullan	Raith Rovers	St Johnstone	Free
1 June 2025	Jordan McGhee	Dundee	Motherwell	Free
1 June 2025	Ryan Leak	Ross County	Free agent	Free
3 June 2025	Scott Bain	Celtic	Falkirk	Free
3 June 2025	Nicolas Milanovic	Western Sydney Wanderers	Aberdeen	£385,000
3 June 2025	Glenn Middleton	Dundee United	Doncaster Rovers	Free
3 June 2025	Kyle Vassell	Kilmarnock	Free agent	Free
4 June 2025	David Mitchell	Partick Thistle	Ayr United	Free
5 June 2025	Jack McConnell	Arbroath	Free agent	Free
5 June 2025	Jason Thomson	Arbroath	Free agent	Free
5 June 2025	Keith Watson	Arbroath	Free agent	Free
5 June 2025	Raphael Sallinger	TSV Hartberg	Hibernian	Undisclosed
5 June 2025	Sean McGinty	Hamilton Academical	Airdrieonians	Free
5 June 2025	Josh Nisbet	Ross County	Roda JC	Free
6 June 2025	Declan Gallagher	Dundee United	Ross County	Free
6 June 2025	Joe Wright	Kilmarnock	Bradford City	Free
6 June 2025	Emmanuel Gyamfi	Schalke	Aberdeen	Undisclosed
8 June 2025	Kusini Yengi	Portsmouth	Aberdeen	Free
9 June 2025	Fraser Murray	Kilmarnock	Wigan Athletic	Free
9 June 2025	Connor McLennan	Ayr United	Livingston	Free
10 June 2025	Zac Sapsford	Western Sydney Wanderers	Dundee United	Undisclosed
10 June 2025	Iurie Iovu	NK Istra 1961	Dundee United	Free
10 June 2025	Kieran Tierney	Arsenal	Celtic	Free
10 June 2025	Jamie Brandon	Livingston	Kilmarnock	Free
10 June 2025	Gary Mackay-Steven	Kilmarnock	Ross County	Free
10 June 2025	Graham Carey	St Johnstone	Livingston	Free
11 June 2025	Stevie May	St Johnstone	Livingston	Free
11 June 2025	Aidan Connolly	Raith Rovers	Queen's Park	Free
11 June 2025	Euan Henderson	Hamilton Academical	Airdrieonians	Free
12 June 2025	Craig Clay	Dunfermline Athletic	Kelty Hearts	Free
12 June 2025	Jack Turner	Queen's Park	Woking	Free
12 June 2025	Will Tizzard	Queen's Park	Sutton United	Free
12 June 2025	Zak Rudden	Queen's Park	Livingston	Free
12 June 2025	Michael Ruth	Dumbarton	Queen's Park	Free
12 June 2025	Drey Wright	St Johnstone	Dundee	Free
12 June 2025	Logan O’Boy	Greenock Morton	Free agent	Free
12 June 2025	Lamar Reynolds	Greenock Morton	Free agent	Free
12 June 2025	Paul Digby	Cambridge United	Dundee	Free
13 June 2025	Jamie Hislop	Ayr United	East Stirlingshire	Free
13 June 2025	Kenzie Mitchell	Ayr United	East Stirlingshire	Free
13 June 2025	Lucas McRoberts	Ayr United	East Stirlingshire	Free
13 June 2025	Shane Blaney	Motherwell	Livingston	Free
13 June 2025	Carlo Pignatiello	Dumbarton	Queen's Park	Free
13 June 2025	Richard Taylor	St Mirren	Bolton Wanderers	Free
13 June 2025	Brian Graham	Partick Thistle	Falkirk	Undisclosed
14 June 2025	Cammy Kerr	Queen's Park	Livingston	Free
14 June 2025	Dan Casey	Motherwell	Wycombe Wanderers	Free
15 June 2025	Cláudio Braga	Aalesunds	Heart of Midlothian	Undisclosed
16 June 2025	Logan Ross	Ross County	Inverness Caledonian Thistle	Free
16 June 2025	Liam Dick	Raith Rovers	Ayr United	Free
16 June 2025	Shaun Want	Larne	Ayr United	Free
16 June 2025	Caolan Boyd-Munce	St Mirren	Wycombe Wanderers	Free
16 June 2025	Aidan Glavin	Kilmarnock	Raith Rovers	Free
16 June 2025	Zeke Cameron	Dundee United	Dunfermline Athletic	Free
16 June 2025	Ross Docherty	Dundee United	Ross County	Free
16 June 2025	Josh Fowler	Dubai City	Queen's Park	Free
16 June 2025	Harry Paton	Motherwell	Free agent	Free
16 June 2025	Davor Zdravkovski	Motherwell	AEL Limassol	Free
16 June 2025	Moses Ebiye	Motherwell	Free agent	Free
16 June 2025	Matthew Smith	St Johnstone	Newport County	Free
16 June 2025	David Craig	Ayr United	Glenafton Athletic	Loan
17 June 2025	Patrick Reading	Ayr United	Partick Thistle	Free
17 June 2025	Ben Wilson	Airdrieonians	The New Saints	Undisclosed
17 June 2025	Lewis McGregor	Airdrieonians	Coleraine	Undisclosed
17 June 2025	Ross Munro	Falkirk	Inverness Caledonian Thistle	Free
17 June 2025	Richard King	Cavalier	St Mirren	Undisclosed
17 June 2025	Greg Kiltie	St Mirren	Kilmarnock	Undisclosed
17 June 2025	Jack Thomson	Queen's Park	Kilmarnock	Free
17 June 2025	Matthew Shiels	Dumbarton	Queen's Park	Free
17 June 2025	Sam Stanton	Raith Rovers	St Johnstone	Free
17 June 2025	Josh Rae	St Johnstone	Raith Rovers	Free
17 June 2025	Reghan Tumilty	Hamilton Academical	St Johnstone	Free
17 June 2025	Mason Hancock	Airdrieonians	Walsall	Free
17 June 2025	Scott Fraser	Dundee	Free agent	Free
17 June 2025	Antonio Portales	Dundee	Free agent	Free
17 June 2025	Joe Shaughnessy	Dundee	Newcastle Jets	Free
18 June 2025	Joe Chalmers	Dunfermline Athletic	Inverness Caledonian Thistle	Free
18 June 2025	Aaron Muirhead	Partick Thistle	Arbroath	Free
18 June 2025	Craig Watson	Airdrieonians	Arbroath	Free
18 June 2025	Scott Tiffoney	Dundee	Kilmarnock	Free
18 June 2025	Stuart Bannigan	Partick Thistle	Ayr United	Free
18 June 2025	Jayden Richardson	Boreham Wood	St Mirren	Free
19 June 2025	Ben Crompton	Sunderland	Ross County	Free
19 June 2025	Stuart Findlay	Oxford United	Heart of Midlothian	Loan
19 June 2025	George Stanger	Ayr United	Kilmarnock	Free
19 June 2025	Euan Murray	Raith Rovers	Queen's Park	Free
19 June 2025	James McGarry	Aberdeen	Brisbane Roar	Undisclosed
20 June 2025	Leon Balogun	Rangers	Aris Limassol	Free
20 June 2025	Nikolay Todorov	Hamilton Academical	Arbroath	Free
20 June 2025	Marcus Dackers	Salford City	Kilmarnock	Free
20 June 2025	Ross Doohan	Aberdeen	Celtic	Free
20 June 2025	Panutche Camara	Crawley Town	Dundee United	Free
20 June 2025	Jamie Barjonas	Hamilton Academical	Airdrieonians	Free
20 June 2025	Adam Frizzell	Airdrieonians	Derry City	Free
21 June 2025	Josh Scott	Queen's Park	Darlington	Free
21 June 2025	Dylan Vente	Hibernian	Heerenveen	Undisclosed
21 June 2025	Arron Lyall	Greenock Morton	Ross County	Free
23 June 2025	Emile Acquah	Barrow	Dundee	Undisclosed
23 June 2025	Liam Donnelly	Kilmarnock	St Mirren	Free
23 June 2025	Alex King	Crusaders	Airdrieonians	Free
23 June 2025	Dean Cornelius	Harrogate Town	Ross County	Free
24 June 2025	David Wotherspoon	Dunfermline Athletic	Inverness Caledonian Thistle	Free
24 June 2025	Mohamed Sylla	Dundee	Livingston	Free
24 June 2025	Dom Thomas	Derry City	Ayr United	Free
24 June 2025	Steve Seddon	Motherwell	Wimbledon	Free
25 June 2025	Stephen Kelly	Livingston	Orange County SC	Free
25 June 2025	Jackson Longridge	Hamilton Academical	Greenock Morton	Free
25 June 2025	Robbie Mutch	Ayr United	Cove Rangers	Free
25 June 2025	Max Aarons	Bournemouth	Rangers	Loan
25 June 2025	Jannik Wanner	SKU Amstetten	Livingston	Undisclosed
25 June 2025	Yevhen Kucherenko	LNZ Cherkasy	Dundee United	Undisclosed
26 June 2025	Elliot Watt	Burton Albion	Motherwell	Free
26 June 2025	Jack Newman	Dundee United	Peterhead	Free
27 June 2025	Archie Graham	Queen's Park	Stenhousemuir	Free
27 June 2025	Layton Bisland	Arbroath	Cove Rangers	Free
27 June 2025	Ross Callachan	Motherwell	Arbroath	Free
27 June 2025	Benjamin Nygren	Nordsjaelland	Celtic	£2,000,000
27 June 2025	Josh Mulligan	Dundee	Hibernian	Compensation
27 June 2025	Nathan Moriah-Welsh	Hibernian	Mansfield Town	Undisclosed
27 June 2025	Owen Oseni	St Mirren	Plymouth Argyle	Undisclosed
27 June 2025	Plamen Galabov	Maccabi Petah Tikva	Dundee	Free
27 June 2025	Michee Efete	Ross County	Free agent	Free
27 June 2025	Ricki Lamie	Ross County	Free agent	Free
27 June 2025	Ryan Mullen	Greenock Morton	St Mirren	Free
27 June 2025	Macaulay Tait	Heart of Midlothian	Livingston	Loan
27 June 2025	Bert Esselink	Stal Mielec	Dundee United	Free
29 June 2025	Daniel Armstrong	Kilmarnock	Dinamo București	Free
30 June 2025	Jair Tavares	Hibernian	Kauno Žalgiris	Free
30 June 2025	Jordan Amissah	Ross County	Burton Albion	Undisclosed
30 June 2025	Callum Osmand	Fulham	Celtic	Compensation
1 July 2025	Meshack Ubochioma	Dundee United	Kazincbarcikai SC	Free
1 July 2025	Lukas Fadinger	Rheindorf Altach	Motherwell	Free
1 July 2025	Greg Taylor	Celtic	PAOK	Free
1 July 2025	George Harmon	Ross County	Cheltenham Town	Free
1 July 2025	Tony Yogane	Brentford	Dundee	Loan
2 July 2025	Joe Rothwell	Bournemouth	Rangers	Undisclosed
2 July 2025	Emmanuel Fernandez	Peterborough United	Rangers	£3,500,000
2 July 2025	Nohan Kenneh	Hibernian	Tranmere Rovers	Free
3 July 2025	Matty Foulds	Harrogate Town	St Johnstone	Free
3 July 2025	Brad Foster	Wrexham	Ross County	Free
3 July 2025	Kjartan Mar Kjartansson	Stjarnan	Aberdeen	Undisclosed
3 July 2025	Isaac Pappoe	Ferencváros	Dundee United	Loan
4 July 2025	Alex Fairlie	Queen's Park	Beith Juniors	Free
4 July 2025	Rocco Hickey-Fugaccia	Queen's Park	Arbroath	Free
4 July 2025	Arran Pettifer	Cliftonville	Arbroath	Free
4 July 2025	Robbie Hemfrey	Arbroath	Free agent	Free
4 July 2025	Max Stryjek	Jagiellonia Białystok	Kilmarnock	Undisclosed
4 July 2025	Dario Naamo	St. Pölten	Dundee United	Loan
4 July 2025	Hayato Inamura	Albirex Niigata	Celtic	Undisclosed
4 July 2025	Ashley Hay	Brentford	Dundee	Undisclosed
4 July 2025	Alfons Amade	Septemvri Sofia	Dunfermline Athletic	Undisclosed
4 July 2025	Kris Moore	Leeds United	Greenock Morton	Free
4 July 2025	Cammy Logan	Forfar Athletic	Partick Thistle	Free
4 July 2025	Len O'Sullivan	Glenavon	Ross County	Free
4 July 2025	Adam Emslie	Aberdeen	Ross County	Free
5 July 2025	James Penrice	Heart of Midlothian	AEK Athens	£2,000,000
5 July 2025	Thelo Aasgaard	Luton Town	Rangers	£3,500,000
5 July 2025	Maik Nawrocki	Celtic	Hannover 96	Loan
6 July 2025	Adil Aouchiche	Sunderland	Aberdeen	Loan
7 July 2025	Sonny Hart	Swindon Town	Greenock Morton	Loan
7 July 2025	Liam Sole	Livingston	Inverness Caledonian Thistle	Loan
7 July 2025	Lewis Neilson	Heart of Midlothian	Falkirk	Loan
7 July 2025	Eseosa Sule	West Bromwich Albion	Motherwell	Loan
7 July 2025	Djenairo Daniels	Cork City	Kilmarnock	Free
7 July 2025	Tom Lowery	Portsmouth	Kilmarnock	Free
7 July 2025	Cheick Diabate	Exeter City	St Johnstone	Free
8 July 2025	Joseph Smith	Queen's Park	Linlithgow Rose	Free
8 July 2025	Gustaf Lagerbielke	Celtic	Braga	£2,200,000
8 July 2025	Toby Steward	Portsmouth	St Johnstone	Loan
9 July 2025	Scott Honeyman	Falkirk	Dumbarton	Free
9 July 2025	Tony Watt	Dundee United	Partick Thistle	Free
9 July 2025	Nasser Djiga	Wolverhampton Wanderers	Rangers	Loan
9 July 2025	Elijah Just	Horsens	Motherwell	Undisclosed
10 July 2025	Jorge Grant	Heart of Midlothian	Salford City	Free
10 July 2025	Lennon Connolly	Queen's Park	Arbroath	Free
10 July 2025	Brooklyn Kabongolo	Aveley	Livingston	Free
10 July 2025	Emmanuel Longelo	Birmingham City	Motherwell	Undisclosed
11 July 2025	Nicolas Kühn	Celtic	Como	£16,300,000
11 July 2025	Rory MacLeod	Dundee United	Dunfermline Athletic	Undisclosed
11 July 2025	Alasdair Davidson	Celtic	Dunfermline Athletic	Free
11 July 2025	Shea Kearney	Cliftonville	Dunfermline Athletic	Undisclosed
11 July 2025	Henry Cartwright	Leicester City	Falkirk	Loan
11 July 2025	Eddie Beach	Chelsea	Kilmarnock	Free
11 July 2025	Ibrahim Said	Viborg	Motherwell	£115,000
12 July 2025	Michael Nottingham	Livingston	Brackley Town	Free
12 July 2025	Zach Balfour	Queen's Park	Annan Athletic	Free
12 July 2025	Freddie Owens	Hibernian	East Kilbride	Loan
12 July 2025	Dean Cleland	Hibernian	East Kilbride	Loan
13 July 2025	Thibault Klidjé	Luzern	Hibernian	Undisclosed
14 July 2025	Louis Lloyd	Caernarfon Town	St Johnstone	Undisclosed
14 July 2025	Amar Fatah	Troyes	Dundee United	Loan
15 July 2025	Kyle McClelland	Hibernian	Glenavon	Free
15 July 2025	Elvis Bwomono	St Mirren	ÍBV	Free
15 July 2025	Tsoanelo Letsosa	Lommel	Partick Thistle	Free
15 July 2025	Krisztián Keresztes	Nyíregyháza Spartacus	Dundee United	Loan
15 July 2025	Andre Raymond	St Johnstone	Ilves	Undisclosed
15 July 2025	Djeidi Gassama	Sheffield Wednesday	Rangers	£2,200,000
15 July 2025	Callum Jones	Hull City	Dundee	Free
15 July 2025	Alfie Stewart	Aberdeen	Inverness Caledonian Thistle	Loan
16 July 2025	Harry Cochrane	Queen of the South	Arbroath	Free
16 July 2025	Luke Kenny	St Mirren	Arbroath	Loan
17 July 2025	Dennis Adeniran	St Mirren	Barnet	Free
17 July 2025	Nicky Clark	St Johnstone	Ross County	Free
17 July 2025	Stevie Mallan	Salford City	St Johnstone	Free
17 July 2025	Kevin Holt	Derry City	Ayr United	Undisclosed
18 July 2025	Max Watters	Barnsley	Dundee United	Loan
18 July 2025	Ivan Dolček	Dunajska Streda	Dundee United	Loan
18 July 2025	Reece McAlear	Livingston	St Johnstone	Undisclosed
18 July 2025	Jamie Lindsay	Bristol Rovers	Ross County	Free
19 July 2025	Shin Yamada	Kawasaki Frontale	Celtic	£1,500,000
19 July 2025	Alfie Dorrington	Tottenham Hotspur	Aberdeen	Loan
19 July 2025	Allan Delferrière	Hibernian	Free agent	Free
19 July 2025	Tunmise Sobowale	Swindon Town	St Mirren	Free
21 July 2025	Luis Palma	Celtic	Lech Poznań	Loan
22 July 2025	Sabah Kerjota	Sambenedettese	Heart of Midlothian	£120,000
22 July 2025	Jalmaro Calvin	Cavalier	St Mirren	Undisclosed
23 July 2025	Benjamin Mbunga Kimpioka	St Johnstone	Sivasspor	Free
23 July 2025	Vicente Besuijen	Aberdeen	HJK Helsinki	Loan
24 July 2025	Louis Moult	Dundee United	Crewe Alexandra	Free
24 July 2025	Shamal George	Wycombe Wanderers	St Mirren	Loan
24 July 2025	Miguel Freckleton	Sheffield United	St Mirren	Undisclosed
24 July 2025	Rhys Breen	Dunfermline Athletic	East Kilbride	Free
25 July 2025	Kwon Hyeok-kyu	Celtic	Nantes	Undisclosed
25 July 2025	Adam Montgomery	Celtic	Livingston	Loan
25 July 2025	Oscar MacIntyre	Hibernian	Inverness Caledonian Thistle	Undisclosed
26 July 2025	Robin Propper	Rangers	Twente	£1,500,000
26 July 2025	Aidan Denholm	Heart of Midlothian	Livingston	Undisclosed
28 July 2025	Corrie Ndaba	Kilmarnock	Lecce	Undisclosed
28 July 2025	Peter Urminský	St Mirren	Glentoran	Loan
28 July 2025	Jeremy Bokila	Willem II	Livingston	Free
31 July 2025	Max Boruc	Hibernian	Helsingør	Free
31 July 2025	Malik Dijksteel	Cork City	St Mirren	Undisclosed
31 July 2025	Richard Jensen	Aberdeen	Panionios	Free
31 July 2025	Ewan McLeod	Dunfermline Athletic	East Fife	Loan
1 August 2025	Eamonn Brophy	Ross County	Greenock Morton	Free
1 August 2025	Billy Terrell	Bournemouth	Dunfermline Athletic	Free
1 August 2025	Taylor Sutherland	Dunfermline Athletic	Clyde	Loan
1 August 2025	Mikey Moore	Tottenham Hotspur	Rangers	Loan
1 August 2025	Pape Habib Guèye	Aberdeen	Kasımpaşa	£850,000
1 August 2025	Alfie Bavidge	Aberdeen	Inverness Caledonian Thistle	Loan
1 August 2025	Ross McCausland	Rangers	Aris Limassol	Loan
2 August 2025	Michael O'Halloran	Dunfermline Athletic	Greenock Morton	Free
2 August 2025	Dominic Thompson	Motherwell	Kilmarnock	Free
4 August 2025	Reece Evans	Queen's Park	Reading	Free
4 August 2025	Ben McPherson	Celtic	Partick Thistle	Loan
4 August 2025	Lewis Miller	Hibernian	Blackburn Rovers	Undisclosed
4 August 2025	Oliver Antman	Go Ahead Eagles	Rangers	£3,000,000
4 August 2025	Tómas Bent Magnússon	Valur	Heart of Midlothian	Undisclosed
5 August 2025	Jake Sutherland	Dunfermline Athletic	Forfar Athletic	Loan
5 August 2025	Jahmai Simpson-Pusey	Manchester City	Celtic	Loan
5 August 2025	Grant Hanley	Birmingham City	Hibernian	Free
5 August 2025	Joe Westley	Burnley	Dundee	Undisclosed
6 August 2025	Pierre Landry Kabore	Narva Trans	Heart of Midlothian	Undisclosed
6 August 2025	Jort van der Sande	Dundee United	SC Cambuur	Undisclosed
7 August 2025	Keanu Baccus	Mansfield Town	St Mirren	Undisclosed
7 August 2025	Adam Forrester	Heart of Midlothian	St Johnstone	Loan
7 August 2025	Matthew Connelly	Motherwell	Airdrieonians	Loan
8 August 2025	Alex Iacovitti	St Mirren	Ross County	Free
8 August 2025	Marvin Ekpiteta	Hibernian	Milton Keynes Dons	Undisclosed
8 August 2025	Miguel Chaiwa	Young Boys	Hibernian	Undisclosed
8 August 2025	Yan Dhanda	Heart of Midlothian	Dundee	Loan
8 August 2025	James Scott	St Mirren	Ross County	Loan
12 August 2025	Zac Williams	Crewe Alexandra	Kilmarnock	Loan
12 August 2025	Alex Samuel	Ross County	Partick Thistle	Free
12 August 2025	Lennon Miller	Motherwell	Udinese	£4,750,000
13 August 2025	Julius Eskesen	Haugesund	Dundee United	Undisclosed
14 August 2025	Kenan Bilalovic	Varnamo	Aberdeen	Undisclosed
14 August 2025	Dario Naamo	St. Pölten	Dundee United	Undisclosed
14 August 2025	Luca Stephenson	Liverpool	Dundee United	Loan
15 August 2025	Matthew Warbrick	St Cadoc's	Ayr United	Free
15 August 2025	Esapa Osong	Nottingham Forest	Motherwell	Loan
15 August 2025	Robbie Fraser	Rangers	Dunfermline Athletic	Undisclosed
15 August 2025	Jefferson Cáceres	Sheffield United	Dunfermline Athletic	Undisclosed
16 August 2025	Rory Whittaker	Hibernian	Southampton	Undisclosed
17 August 2025	Jayden Meghoma	Brentford	Rangers	Loan
18 August 2025	Callum Hendry	Milton Keynes Dons	Motherwell	Undisclosed
18 August 2025	Marko Lazetić	AC Milan	Aberdeen	Undisclosed
20 August 2025	Slobodan Rubežić	Aberdeen	Korona Kielce	Undisclosed
21 August 2025	Jefté	Rangers	Palmeiras	£6,000,000
22 August 2025	Regan Charles-Cook	KAS Eupen	Motherwell	Free
22 August 2025	Cameron Congreve	Swansea City	Dundee	Loan
22 August 2025	Shaun Donnellan	Livingston	Truro City	Loan
22 August 2025	Jose Cifuentes	Rangers	Toronto FC	Loan
23 August 2025	Ben Davies	Rangers	Oxford United	Loan
23 August 2025	Ridvan Yilmaz	Rangers	Besiktas	Undisclosed
23 August 2025	Nikolaj Möller	St Gallen	Dundee United	Undisclosed
25 August 2025	Marco Tilio	Celtic	Rapid Vienna	Undisclosed
25 August 2025	Kai Fotheringham	Dundee United	St Johnstone	Undisclosed
26 August 2025	Lewis McCann	Dunfermline Athletic	Fleetwood Town	Free
26 August 2025	Ethan Hamilton	Lincoln City	Dundee	Undisclosed
26 August 2025	Oscar Priestman	Western Sydney Wanderers	Motherwell	Undisclosed
27 August 2025	Charlie Telfer	Ross County	Airdrieonians	Free
27 August 2025	Liam Smith	Bohemians	St Johnstone	Free
28 August 2025	Zak Rudden	Livingston	Dunfermline Athletic	Undisclosed
28 August 2025	Michel-Ange Balikwisha	Royal Antwerp	Celtic	£4,500,000
29 August 2025	Hamza Igamane	Rangers	Lille	£10,400,000
29 August 2025	Eduardo Ageu	Santa Clara	Heart of Midlothian	Undisclosed
29 August 2025	Taylor Steven	St Johnstone	Arbroath	Loan
29 August 2025	Kyrell Wilson	Swansea City	Falkirk	Loan
29 August 2025	Rocco Friel	Queens Park Rangers	Queen's Park	Loan
29 August 2025	Robby McCrorie	Kilmarnock	Esbjerg	Loan
29 August 2025	Ewan Wilson	Motherwell	Raith Rovers	Loan
29 August 2025	Marcelo Saracchi	Boca Juniors	Celtic	Loan
30 August 2025	Bojan Miovski	Girona	Rangers	£2,600,000
30 August 2025	James Brown	Ross County	Kilmarnock	Free
30 August 2025	Mitchel Frame	Celtic	Aberdeen	£250,000
30 August 2025	Trey Samuel-Ogunsuyi	Sunderland	Falkirk	Loan
31 August 2025	Alexander Schwolow	Union Berlin	Heart of Midlothian	Free
31 August 2025	Ethan Williams	Manchester United	Falkirk	Loan
1 September 2025	Aaron Comrie	Dunfermline Athletic	Greenock Morton	Free
1 September 2025	Shayden Morris	Aberdeen	Luton Town	Undisclosed
1 September 2025	Kevin Nisbet	Millwall	Aberdeen	£300,000
1 September 2025	Jesper Karlsson	Bologna	Aberdeen	Loan
1 September 2025	Óscar Cortés	Rangers	Sporting Gijon	Loan
1 September 2025	Derek Cornelius	Marseille	Rangers	Loan
1 September 2025	Youssef Chermiti	Everton	Rangers	£8,000,000
1 September 2025	Cyriel Dessers	Rangers	Panathinaikos	£3,700,000
1 September 2025	Junior Robinson	West Ham United	Livingston	Loan
1 September 2025	Mahamadou Susoho	Manchester City	Livingston	Loan
1 September 2025	Makenzie Kirk	St Johnstone	Portsmouth	Undisclosed
1 September 2025	Stephen Welsh	Celtic	Motherwell	Loan
1 September 2025	Adam Idah	Celtic	Swansea City	£6,000,000
1 September 2025	Sebastian Tounekti	Hammarby	Celtic	£5,200,000
1 September 2025	Dan Nlundulu	Bolton Wanderers	St Mirren	Undisclosed
1 September 2025	Oisin Smyth	St Mirren	Partick Thistle	Loan
1 September 2025	Filip Lissah	Swansea City	Falkirk	Loan
1 September 2025	Sam Hart	Port Vale	Falkirk	Loan
1 September 2025	Daniel Barlaser	Middlesbrough	Hibernian	Loan
1 September 2025	Zach Mitchell	Charlton Athletic	Hibernian	Loan
1 September 2025	Richard Odada	Dundee United	Free agent	Free
1 September 2025	Nurudeen Abdulai	Medeama SC	Dunfermline Athletic	Undisclosed

== See also ==
- List of Scottish football transfers winter 2024–25
- List of Scottish football transfers winter 2025–26
