= 2026–27 Dundee United F.C. season =

Dundee United
2026–27 season
- Chairman: Mark Ogren
- Manager: Jim Goodwin
- Stadium: Tannadice Park
- Scottish League Cup: Second round
Home colours	Away colours

The 2026–27 season is Dundee United's 117th season. It is their third consecutive season in the Scottish Premiership, having finished in seventh place in the previous season. The club will also participate in the Scottish Cup and the League Cup.

== Results and fixtures ==
Win Draw Loss Fixtures

=== Pre-season and friendlies ===
25 July 2026 Friendly	Salford City	3–2	Dundee United	Salford, England
15:00 BST	Langstaff 10'; Oluwo 45'; Austerfield 84'	Report	Metsoko 65'; Forrest 89'	Stadium: Moor Lane

=== Scottish Premiership ===
31 July 2026 1	Dundee United	1–1	Rangers	Dundee
20:00 BST	Rose 38'	Report	Aasgaard 56'	Stadium: Tannadice Park; Attendance: 13,465; Referee: Nick Walsh

8 August 2026 2	Heart of Midlothian	4–0	Dundee United	Edinburgh
15:00 BST	Renaud 4'; Miller 12' (pen.); Braga 56'; McPake 67'	Report		Stadium: Tynecastle Park; Attendance: 18,602; Referee: Kevin Clancy

22 August 2026 3	Dundee United	0–2	Dundee	Dundee
17:45 BST		Report	Wright 43'; O. Bevan 57'	Stadium: Tannadice Park; Attendance: 13,337; Referee: David Dickinson

29 August 2026 4	Kilmarnock	0–4	Dundee United	Kilmarnock
15:00 BST		Report	Agyei 12'; Sapsford 36' (pen.); Ferry 41'; Randall 77'	Stadium: Rugby Park; Attendance: 5,389; Referee: Nick Walsh

2 September 2026 5	Motherwell	3–0	Dundee United	Motherwell
19:45 BST	Palmer-Houlden 19'; Lowry 65'; Levitt 67'	Report		Stadium: Fir Park; Attendance: 6,412; Referee: Calum Scott

5 September 2026 6	Dundee United	1–1	Falkirk	Dundee
15:00 BST	Forbes 90+3'	Report	Murrell 4'	Stadium: Tannadice Park; Attendance: 8,935; Referee: Dan McFarlane

19 September 2026 7	St Mirren	0–3	Dundee United	Paisley
15:00 BST		Report	Randall 6'; Cameron 12'; Ciubotaru 45'	Stadium: St Mirren Park; Attendance: 6,975; Referee: David Dickinson

10 October 2026 8	Dundee United	1–0	Hibernian	Dundee
15:00 BST	Bennie 35'	Report		Stadium: Tannadice Park; Attendance: 10,331; Referee: Don Robertson

17 October 2026 9	St Johnstone	1–1	Dundee United	Perth
15:00 BST	Fowler 21'	Report	Cameron 79'	Stadium: McDiarmid Park; Attendance: 6,351; Referee: Ross Hardie

24 October 2026 10	Dundee United	3–2	Aberdeen	Dundee
15:00 BST	Iqbal 14'; Tait 27'; Sapsford 72'	Report	Guinness-Walker 25'; Ronan 56'	Stadium: Tannadice Park; Attendance: 10,697; Referee: David Dickinson

28 October 2026 11	Celtic	2–2	Dundee United	Glasgow
19:45 GMT	Durán 18'; Scales 65'	Report	Sapsford 28'; Farrugia 31'	Stadium: Celtic Park; Referee: Steven McLean

31 October 2026 12	Dundee United	P–P	Heart of Midlothian	Dundee
15:00 GMT				Stadium: Tannadice Park

7 November 2026 13	Dundee United	1–1	Motherwell	Dundee
15:00 GMT	Randall 41'	Report	Fadinger 9' (pen.)	Stadium: Tannadice Park; Attendance: 8,759; Referee: Ryan Lee

21 November 2026 14	Hibernian	0–4	Dundee United	Edinburgh
15:00 GMT		Report	Sapsford 8', 39'; Cameron 51'; Randall 60'	Stadium: Easter Road; Attendance: 17,001; Referee: John Beaton

28 November 2026 15	Dundee United	–	St Johnstone	Dundee
15:00 GMT				Stadium: Tannadice Park

=== Scottish League Cup ===
==== Group stage ====
11 July 2026 1	Stirling Albion	0–1	Dundee United	Stirling
17:30 BST		Report	Sapsford 90+3' (pen.)	Stadium: Forthbank Stadium; Attendance: 1,553; Referee: Grant Irvine

14 July 2026 2	Montrose	1–0	Dundee United	Montrose
19:45 BST	Webster 37'	Report		Stadium: Links Park; Attendance: 1,454; Referee: Ross Hardie

18 July 2026 3	Dundee United	3–0	Arbroath	Dundee
19:00 BST	Sapsford 37'; Metsoko 54'; Rose 68'	Report		Stadium: Tannadice Park; Attendance: 2,922; Referee: Jamie Wilkie

21 July 2026 4	Dundee United	4–0	The Spartans	Dundee
19:45 BST	Rose 26', 64'; Tait 73'; Sapsford 90+2'	Report		Stadium: Tannadice Park; Attendance: 2,205; Referee: Dan McFarlane

==== Knockout phase ====
15 August 2026 Second round	Dundee United	0–4	Celtic	Dundee
17:45 BST		Report	Trusty 22'; Durán 24'; Tounekti 54'; Nygren 63'	Stadium: Tannadice Park; Attendance: 9,136; Referee: Steven McLean

== Player statistics ==
=== Appearances and goals ===
As of 21 November 2026

No.	Pos	Player	Premiership		Scottish Cup		League Cup		Total	
No.	Pos	Player	Apps	Goals	Apps	Goals	Apps	Goals	Apps	Goals
1	GK	(England) Jack Walton	13+0	0	0+0	0	5+0	0	18	0
3	DF	(Netherlands) Bert Esselink	13+0	0	0+0	0	3+0	0	16	0
4	DF	(Moldova) Iurie Iovu	0+1	0	0+0	0	2+0	0	3	0
5	MF	(Croatia) Vicko Ševelj	3+0	0	0+0	0	3+2	0	8	0
6	DF	(Scotland) Ross Graham	0+0	0	0+0	0	1+0	0	1	0
7	MF	(Algeria) Mehdi Merghem	4+2	0	0+0	0	0+1	0	7	0
8	MF	(Guinea-Bissau) Panutche Camará	4+6	0	0+0	0	2+3	0	15	0
9	FW	(Australia) Zac Sapsford	8+4	5	0+0	0	5+0	3	17	8
10	MF	(Scotland) Dylan Tait	11+1	1	0+0	0	4+0	1	16	2
11	DF	(Republic of Ireland) Will Ferry	5+1	1	0+0	0	2+0	0	8	1
12	MF	(Ghana) Emmanuel Agyei	4+1	1	0+0	0	3+1	0	9	1
14	MF	(Iraq) Zidane Iqbal	7+1	1	0+0	0	0+0	0	8	1
15	FW	(Australia) Lachlan Rose	2+10	1	0+0	0	4+1	3	17	4
16	MF	(Scotland) Lyall Cameron	7+1	3	0+0	0	0+0	0	8	3
18	DF	(Northern Ireland) Michael Forbes	13+0	0	0+0	0	4+1	0	18	0
19	DF	(Romania) Kevin Ciubotaru	8+1	0	0+0	0	1+0	0	10	0
20	DF	(Republic of Ireland) Neil Farrugia	1+8	1	0+0	0	0+0	0	9	1
21	FW	(New Zealand) Jesse Randall	10+3	3	0+0	0	3+0	0	16	3
22	DF	(Iraq) Dario Naamo	0+2	0	0+0	0	3+1	0	6	0
23	DF	(Australia) Joshua Rawlins	12+0	0	0+0	0	4+1	0	17	0
26	MF	(Ivory Coast) Abdoulaye Yoro	3+7	0	0+0	0	0+1	0	11	0
30	GK	(Ghana) Jordan Amissah	0+0	0	0+0	0	0+0	0	0	0
45	MF	(Scotland) Cohen Leiper	0+0	0	0+0	0	0+4	0	4	0
60	FW	(Italy) Lorenzo Sassetti	0+0	0	0+0	0	0+1	0	1	0
77	FW	(Australia) Daniel Bennie	9+3	1	0+0	0	0+1	0	13	1
93	FW	(Togo) Idjessi Metsoko	4+4	0	0+0	0	1+3	1	12	1
Players who left the club during the 2026–27 season:
14	MF	(Denmark) Julius Eskesen	0+0	0	0+0	0	4+1	0	5	0
31	GK	(Scotland) Ruairidh Adams	0+0	0	0+0	0	0+0	0	0	0
34	FW	(Scotland) Owen Stirton	0+0	0	0+0	0	0+0	0	0	0
37	DF	(Scotland) Samuel Cleall-Harding	0+0	0	0+0	0	0+0	0	0	0
38	MF	(Scotland) Keir Gilligan	0+0	0	0+0	0	1+0	0	1	0
39	MF	(Scotland) Scott Constable	0+0	0	0+0	0	0+0	0	0	0
40	FW	(Scotland) Jack Anderson	0+0	0	0+0	0	0+1	0	1	0
48	MF	(Scotland) Jamie Forrest	0+0	0	0+0	0	0+0	0	0	0

== Team statistics ==
=== League table ===
Pos	Team	Pld	W	D	L	GF	GA	GD	Pts	Qualification or relegation (Note: Teams play each other three times (33 matches), before the league is split into two groups (the top six and the bottom six).)
3	Falkirk	14	7	3	4	22	15	+7	24	Qualification for the Conference League second qualifying round (Note: The winners of the 2026–27 Scottish Cup will qualify for the Europa League. If the cup winners also win the league, the spot reserved for the cup winners (Europa League first qualifying round) will pass to the second-placed team, and the spots for the Conference League second qualifying round will move down one league position.)
4	Heart of Midlothian	13	7	2	4	34	22	+12	23	
5	Dundee United	13	5	5	3	21	17	+4	20	
6	St Johnstone	14	4	5	5	18	22	−4	17	
7	Dundee	13	5	2	6	18	23	−5	17	

Updated to match(es) played on 21 November 2026. Source:
Rules for classification: 1) Points; 2) Goal difference; 3) Goals scored; 4) Head-to-head points; 5) Head-to-head goal difference; 6) Play-off (only if deciding champion, UEFA competition qualification, second stage group allocation, or relegation).

=== League results summary ===
Round	1	2	3	4	5	6	7	8	9	10	11	12	13
Ground	H	A	H	A	A	H	A	H	A	H	A	H	A
Result	D	L	L	W	L	D	W	W	D	W	D	D	W
Position	6	11	11	6	9	8	9	5	6	4	5	6	5

Source: SPFL
A = Away; H = Home; W = Win; D = Draw; L = Loss

=== League cup table ===
Pos	Team	Pld	W	PW	PL	L	GF	GA	GD	Pts	Qualification	DUN	MON	ARB	STI	SPA
1	Dundee United	4	3	0	0	1	8	1	+7	9	Qualification for the second round	—	—	3–0	—	4–0
2	Montrose	4	3	0	0	1	5	2	+3	9		1–0	—	—	—	0–2
3	Arbroath	4	2	0	0	2	3	6	−3	6		—	0–2	—	1–0	—
4	Stirling Albion	4	1	0	0	3	3	5	−2	3		0–1	0–2	—	—	—
5	The Spartans	4	1	0	0	3	4	9	−5	3		—	—	1–2	1–3	—

Rules for classification: 1) goal difference, 2) goals scored, 3) away goals scored, 4) matches won, 5) away matches won, 6) drawing of lots.

== Transfers ==
=== Players in ===
Player	From	Fee
(New Zealand) Jesse Randall	(New Zealand) Auckland	Free
(Australia) Lachlan Rose	(Australia) Newcastle Jets	Free
(Australia) Joshua Rawlins	(Australia) Melbourne Victory	Free
(England) Jack Walton	(England) Preston North End	Undisclosed
(Scotland) Dylan Tait	(Scotland) Falkirk	Free
(Northern Ireland) Michael Forbes	(England) West Ham United	Free
(Ghana) Jordan Amissah	(England) Burton Albion	Free
(Algeria) Mehdi Merghem	(France) SC Bastia	Free
(Romania) Kevin Ciubotaru	(Romania) Hermannstadt	Free
(Iraq) Zidane Iqbal	(Netherlands) Utrecht	Undisclosed

=== Players out ===
Player	To	Fee
(Scotland) Craig Sibbald	(Scotland) Falkirk	Free
(Australia) Ryan Strain	(Scotland) Falkirk	Free
(Scotland) Calvin Beattie	Free agent	Free
(Scotland) Lewis Haldane	(Scotland) Lochee United	Free
(Australia) Ashley Maynard-Brewer	(England) Sheffield Wednesday	Free
(Scotland) Lewis O'Donnell	(Scotland) Lochee United	Free
(Scotland) Johnny Russell	Free agent	Free
(North Macedonia) Kristijan Trapanovski	Free agent	Free
(Scotland) Harry Welsh	(Scotland) Lochee United	Free
(Wales) Dave Richards	(England) Kidderminster Harriers	Free

=== Loans in ===
Player	From	Fee
(Togo) Idjessi Metsoko	(Czech Republic) Viktoria Plzeň	Loan
(Australia) Daniel Bennie	(England) Queens Park Rangers	Loan
(Ivory Coast) Abdoulaye Yoro	(Turkey) İstanbul Başakşehir	Loan
(Scotland) Lyall Cameron	(Scotland) Rangers	Loan

=== Loans out ===
Player	To	Fee
(Scotland) Samuel Cleall-Harding	(Scotland) Dunfermline Athletic	Loan
(Scotland) Owen Stirton	(Scotland) Ayr United	Loan
(Scotland) Ruairidh Adams	(Scotland) Airdrieonians	Loan
(Scotland) Scott Constable	(Scotland) Arbroath	Loan
(Scotland) Jack Anderson	(Scotland) Clyde	Co-operation loan
(Scotland) Jamie Forrest	(Scotland) Clyde	Co-operation loan
(Scotland) Keir Gilligan	(Scotland) Clyde	Co-operation loan
(England) Charlie Dewar	(Scotland) Arbroath	Loan
(Denmark) Julius Eskesen	(Finland) KuPS	Loan

== See also ==
- List of Dundee United F.C. seasons
