= 2025–26 Dundee United F.C. season =

Dundee United
2025–26 season
- Chairman: Mark Ogren
- Manager: Jim Goodwin
- Stadium: Tannadice Park
- Scottish Premiership: Seventh place
- Scottish Cup: Quarter-finals
- Scottish League Cup: Second round
- Conference League: Third qualifying round
- Top goalscorer: League: Zac Sapsford (9); All: Zac Sapsford (11)
- Highest home attendance: 13,495 vs. Dundee, Premiership, 3 January 2026
- Lowest home attendance: 4,373 vs. Ayr United, Scottish Cup, 17 January 2026
- Average home league attendance: 10,414
Home colours	Away colours

The 2025–26 season was Dundee United's 116th season. It was their second season back in the Scottish Premiership, having been promoted from the Scottish Championship at the end of the 2023–24 season. The club also participated in the Scottish Cup, League Cup, and the UEFA Conference League.

== Results and fixtures ==
=== Pre-season and friendlies ===
28 June 2025 Friendly	Brechin City	0–3	Dundee United	Brechin
14:00				Stadium: Glebe Park

5 July 2025 Friendly	Arbroath	1–1	Dundee United	Arbroath
14:00	Adams 79' (o.g.)		Esselink 3'	Stadium: Gayfield Park; Attendance: 2,396
Note: Testimonial match for David Gold.

11 July 2025 Friendly	PEC Zwolle	2–1	Dundee United	Oldebroek
18:00				Stadium: Sportpark Bovenmolen

15 July 2025 Friendly	St Johnstone	1–1	Dundee United	Perth
19:45	Kirk 86'	Report	Esselink 18'	Stadium: McDiarmid Park; Referee: Nick Walsh

19 July 2025 Friendly	Dundee United	0–0	Oldham Athletic	Dundee
14:00		Report		Stadium: Tannadice Park; Attendance: 3,428

=== Scottish Premiership ===
3 August 2025 1	Falkirk	2–2	Dundee United	Falkirk
14:00	Tait 50'; Ross 73'	Report	Watters 40'; Dolček 71'	Stadium: Falkirk Stadium; Attendance: 7,624; Referee: John Beaton

9 August 2025 2	Dundee United	2–3	Heart of Midlothian	Dundee
15:00	Dolček 22', 41'	Report	Shankland 19' (pen.); Findlay 58', 90+4'	Stadium: Tannadice Park; Attendance: 10,874; Referee: David Dickinson

31 August 2025 3	Dundee	0–2	Dundee United	Dundee
15:00		Report	Sapsford 14'; Dolček 77'	Stadium: Dens Park; Attendance: 10,750; Referee: Steven McLean

13 September 2025 4	Hibernian	3–3	Dundee United	Edinburgh
15:00	Kucherenko 27' (o.g.); Bowie 51'; McGrath 86' (pen.)	Report	Stephenson 15', 47'; Sapsford 44'; Ševelj (red card) 84'	Stadium: Easter Road; Attendance: 19,265; Referee: Dan McFarlane

23 September 2025 5	Dundee United	2–0	Aberdeen	Dundee
19:45	Dolček 45'; Esselink 50'	Report		Stadium: Tannadice Park; Attendance: 11,052; Referee: Steven McLean

27 September 2025 6	Dundee United	0–2	Kilmarnock	Dundee
15:00		Report	Anderson 26'; Deas 56'	Stadium: Tannadice Park; Attendance: 8,800; Referee: Ross Hardie

4 October 2025 7	Dundee United	1–1	Livingston	Dundee
15:00	Keresztes 48'	Report	Pittman 34'	Stadium: Tannadice Park; Attendance: 8,146; Referee: Duncan Nicolson

18 October 2025 8	Rangers	2–2	Dundee United	Glasgow
15:00	Aasgaard 25'; Tavernier 87'	Report	Trapanovski 66'; Sibbald 75'	Stadium: Ibrox Stadium; Attendance: 50,663; Referee: Don Robertson

25 October 2025 9	Dundee United	3–1	St Mirren	Dundee
15:00	Sapsford 42'; Fatah 84' (pen.); Sibbald 90'	Report	Nlundulu 18'; Gogić (red card) 83'	Stadium: Tannadice Park; Attendance: 8,843; Referee: John Beaton

29 October 2025 10	Motherwell	2–0	Dundee United	Motherwell
19:45	Maswanhise 42'; Watt 77'	Report		Stadium: Fir Park; Attendance: 6,446; Referee: Chris Graham

9 November 2025 11	Heart of Midlothian	1–1	Dundee United	Edinburgh
15:00	Kucherenko 25' (o.g.)	Report	Stephenson 45'	Stadium: Tynecastle Park; Attendance: 18,755; Referee: John Beaton

22 November 2025 12	Dundee United	0–3	Falkirk	Dundee
15:00		Report	Miller 3'; Kucherenko 22' (o.g.); Graham 63'	Stadium: Tannadice Park; Attendance: 9,736; Referee: Nick Walsh

29 November 2025 13	Kilmarnock	1–1	Dundee United	Kilmarnock
17:45	Anderson 34'	Report	Sibbald 63'	Stadium: Rugby Park; Attendance: 4,263; Referee: Matthew MacDermid

3 December 2025 14	Dundee United	2–2	Rangers	Dundee
19:45	Sapsford 11'; Fatah 66'	Report	Meghoma 23'; Bajrami 90+8' (pen.)	Stadium: Tannadice Park; Attendance: 13,213; Referee: David Dickinson

6 December 2025 15	St Mirren	2–0	Dundee United	Paisley
15:00	McMenamin 17'; Baccus 66'	Report		Stadium: St Mirren Park; Attendance: 6,840; Referee: Nick Walsh

13 December 2025 16	Dundee United	0–0	Motherwell	Dundee
15:00		Report		Stadium: Tannadice Park; Attendance: 8,350; Referee: Duncan Nicolson

17 December 2025 17	Dundee United	2–1	Celtic	Dundee
20:00	Keresztes 58'; Sapsford 61'	Report	Maeda 13'	Stadium: Tannadice Park; Attendance: 12,966; Referee: John Beaton

20 December 2025 18	Dundee United	1–1	Hibernian	Dundee
15:00	Stephenson 20'	Report	Boyle 38'	Stadium: Tannadice Park; Attendance: 10,124; Referee: Steven McLean

27 December 2025 19	Aberdeen	1–1	Dundee United	Aberdeen
17:45	Karlsson 60'	Report	Fatah 30'	Stadium: Pittodrie Stadium; Attendance: 19,741; Referee: Calum Scott

30 December 2025 20	Livingston	1–3	Dundee United	Livingston
19:45	McLennan 90+1'	Report	Sapsford 6', 31'; McGowan 86' (o.g.); Fatah 90'	Stadium: Almondvale Stadium; Attendance: 2,657; Referee: Grant Irvine

3 January 2026 21	Dundee United	0–1	Dundee	Dundee
15:00		Report	Hay 45'	Stadium: Tannadice Park; Attendance: 13,495; Referee: Don Robertson

10 January 2026 22	Celtic	4–0	Dundee United	Glasgow
15:00	Yang 27'; Engels 32'; Nygren 63'; Maeda 69'	Report		Stadium: Celtic Park; Referee: Nick Walsh

31 January 2026 23	Dundee United	0–3	Heart of Midlothian	Dundee
20:00	Fatah (red card) 24'; Camará (red card) 75'	Report	Kaboré 11', 81'; Kyziridis 29' (pen.)	Stadium: Tannadice Park; Attendance: 11,627; Referee: Calum Scott

4 February 2026 24	Hibernian	3–2	Dundee United	Edinburgh
19:45	Boyle 36'; Graham 89' (o.g.); Šuto 90+3'	Report	Graham 74'; Watters 81'	Stadium: Easter Road; Attendance: 17,655; Referee: Colin Steven

14 February 2026 25	Falkirk	2–3	Dundee United	Falkirk
15:00	Broggio 17'; Lissah 53'; Henderson (red card) 69'	Report	Graham 24'; Sibbald 55'; Eskesen 83'	Stadium: Falkirk Stadium; Attendance: 7,696; Referee: Ryan Lee

21 February 2026 26	Dundee United	1–1	Kilmarnock	Dundee
20:00	Fatah 74'	Report	Watkins 90+1'; Thomson (red card) 90+4'	Stadium: Tannadice Park; Attendance: 9,047; Referee: John Beaton

24 February 2026 27	Dundee United	0–0	Aberdeen	Dundee
19:45		Report		Stadium: Tannadice Park; Attendance: 10,006; Referee: Don Robertson

28 February 2026 28	Motherwell	2–0	Dundee United	Motherwell
15:00	Maswanhise 37' (pen.), 46'	Report		Stadium: Fir Park; Attendance: 8,054; Referee: Nick Walsh

3 March 2026 29	Dundee United	2–1	St Mirren	Dundee
19:45	Fraser 8' (o.g.); Fatah 83' (pen.)	Report	Young 47'	Stadium: Tannadice Park; Attendance: 8,360; Referee: Matthew MacDermid

15 March 2026 30	Dundee	2–2	Dundee United	Dundee
14:00	Hay 90+4'; Graham 90+6' (o.g.)	Report	Fatah 50' (pen.); Stephenson 66'	Stadium: Dens Park; Attendance: 11,010; Referee: Duncan Nicolson

22 March 2026 31	Dundee United	2–0	Celtic	Dundee
12:30	Ferry 51'; Agyei 66'	Report		Stadium: Tannadice Park; Attendance: 13,228; Referee: Nick Walsh

4 April 2026 32	Rangers	4–2	Dundee United	Glasgow
14:00	Naderi 30'; Sterling 40'; Aasgaard 52'; Miovski 85'	Report	Fatah 45'; Sapsford 72'	Stadium: Ibrox Stadium; Attendance: 51,012; Referee: John Beaton

11 April 2026 33	Dundee United	3–2	Livingston	Dundee
15:00	Ferry 19'; Keresztes 75'; Sapsford 90+3' (pen.)	Report	Smith 49', 53'	Stadium: Tannadice Park; Attendance: 8,470; Referee: Chris Graham

26 April 2026 34	Dundee United	3–0	Dundee	Dundee
14:00	Ferry 14', 70'; Strain 72'	Report		Stadium: Tannadice Park; Attendance: 13,207; Referee: Matthew MacDermid

2 May 2026 35	Kilmarnock	3–0	Dundee United	Kilmarnock
15:00	Deas 20'; Curtis 51'; Hugill 64'	Report		Stadium: Rugby Park; Attendance: 5,524; Referee: Kevin Clancy

9 May 2026 36	Aberdeen	2–0	Dundee United	Aberdeen
15:00	Armstrong 19'; Olusanya 88'	Report	Agyei (red card) 84'	Stadium: Pittodrie Stadium; Attendance: 18,163; Referee: Duncan Nicolson

12 May 2026 37	Dundee United	0–0	Livingston	Dundee
19:45		Report		Stadium: Tannadice Park; Attendance: 8,327; Referee: Grant Irvine

17 May 2026 38	St Mirren	1–1	Dundee United	Paisley
14:00	Young 69'	Report	Sapsford 27'	Stadium: St Mirren Park; Attendance: 6,177; Referee: Steven McLean

=== Scottish League Cup ===
==== Knockout phase ====
17 August 2025 Second round	Kilmarnock	2–1	Dundee United	Kilmarnock
15:00	Dackers 6'; Lyons 69'	Report	Stirton 25'	Stadium: Rugby Park; Attendance: 4,853; Referee: Kevin Clancy

=== Scottish Cup ===
17 January 2026 Fourth round	Dundee United	2–0	Ayr United	Dundee
15:00	Möller 77'; Camará 89'	Report		Stadium: Tannadice Park; Attendance: 4,373; Referee: Ryan Lee

17 February 2026 Fifth round	Dundee United	2–1	The Spartans	Dundee
19:45	Iovu (red card) 12'; Graham 31'; Fatah 55'		Stowe 78'	Stadium: Tannadice Park; Attendance: 4,298; Referee: Grant Irvine

6 March 2026 Quarter-finals	Falkirk	2–1	Dundee United	Falkirk
19:45	Stewart 10'; Yeats 21'	Report	Eskesen 45+2'	Stadium: Falkirk Stadium; Attendance: 7,151; Referee: Steven McLean

=== UEFA Conference League ===
==== Second qualifying round ====
24 July 2025 First leg	(Scotland) Dundee United	1–0	(Luxembourg) UNA Strassen	Dundee
19:45	Sapsford 47'	Report		Stadium: Tannadice Park; Attendance: 11,370; Referee: Marc Nagtegaal

31 July 2025 Second leg	(Luxembourg) UNA Strassen	0–1 (0–2 agg.)	(Scotland) Dundee United	Differdange
19:45		Report	Iovu 63'	Stadium: Stade Municipal; Attendance: 1,957; Referee: Vilhjálmur Thórarinsson

==== Third qualifying round ====
7 August 2025 First leg	(Austria) Rapid Wien	2–2	(Scotland) Dundee United	Vienna
20:00	Dahl 27'; Seidl 44'	Report	Watters 33'; Sapsford 75'	Stadium: Allianz Stadion; Attendance: 18,930; Referee: Luís Miguel Branco Godinho

14 August 2025 Second leg	(Scotland) Dundee United	2–2 (a.e.t.) (4–4 agg.) (4–5 p)	(Austria) Rapid Wien	Dundee
19:45	Watters 25', 42' (pen.)	Report	Iovu 63' (o.g.); Kara 77'	Stadium: Tannadice Park; Attendance: 12,336; Referee: Anastasios Sidiropoulos

== Player statistics ==
=== Appearances and goals ===
As of 17 May 2026

No.	Pos	Player	Premiership		Scottish Cup		League Cup		Conference League		Total	
No.	Pos	Player	Apps	Goals	Apps	Goals	Apps	Goals	Apps	Goals	Apps	Goals
1	GK	(Australia) Ashley Maynard-Brewer	10+0	0	2+0	0	0+0	0	0+0	0	12	0
2	DF	(Australia) Ryan Strain	13+7	1	1+1	0	0+0	0	1+0	0	23	1
3	DF	(Netherlands) Bert Esselink	19+2	1	0+0	0	1+0	0	4+0	0	26	1
4	DF	(Moldova) Iurie Iovu	27+0	0	1+0	0	1+0	0	4+0	1	33	1
5	MF	(Croatia) Vicko Ševelj	28+4	0	2+0	0	1+0	0	4+0	0	39	0
6	DF	(Scotland) Ross Graham	20+1	2	3+0	1	0+0	0	0+0	0	24	3
7	MF	(North Macedonia) Kristijan Trapanovski	5+13	1	1+1	0	0+0	0	2+0	0	22	1
8	MF	(Guinea-Bissau) Panutche Camará	20+8	0	1+1	1	0+1	0	3+1	0	35	1
9	FW	(Australia) Zac Sapsford	31+7	9	2+1	0	0+0	0	4+0	2	45	11
10	MF	(Denmark) Julius Eskesen	3+10	1	0+1	1	0+1	0	0+0	0	15	2
11	DF	(Republic of Ireland) Will Ferry	32+1	4	3+0	0	1+0	0	4+0	0	41	4
12	MF	(Ghana) Emmanuel Agyei	9+1	1	1+0	0	0+0	0	0+0	0	11	1
14	MF	(Scotland) Craig Sibbald	16+7	4	2+0	0	1+0	0	3+1	0	30	4
17	MF	(Sweden) Amar Fatah	22+8	8	2+0	1	1+0	0	0+1	0	34	9
19	DF	(Croatia) Ivan Dolček	10+17	5	1+1	0	1+0	0	3+1	0	34	5
20	DF	(Republic of Ireland) Neil Farrugia	10+3	0	0+1	0	0+0	0	0+0	0	14	0
21	MF	(England) Luca Stephenson	29+0	5	2+1	0	1+0	0	0+0	0	33	5
22	DF	(Iraq) Dario Naamo	8+11	0	1+0	0	0+1	0	0+0	0	21	0
23	DF	(Hungary) Krisztián Keresztes	34+1	3	2+0	0	1+0	0	4+0	0	42	3
25	GK	(Wales) Dave Richards	16+1	0	1+0	0	0+0	0	0+0	0	18	0
34	FW	(Scotland) Owen Stirton	3+7	0	0+2	0	0+1	1	0+4	0	17	1
36	FW	(England) Max Watters	17+6	2	3+0	0	1+0	0	2+2	3	31	5
37	DF	(Scotland) Samuel Cleall-Harding	7+1	0	1+1	0	0+0	0	0+0	0	10	0
39	MF	(Scotland) Scott Constable	0+2	0	0+0	0	0+0	0	0+1	0	3	0
43	MF	(Scotland) Keir Gilligan	1+0	0	0+0	0	0+0	0	0+0	0	1	0
70	MF	(Ghana) Isaac Pappoe	1+0	0	0+0	0	0+0	0	2+1	0	4	0
77	FW	(Scotland) Johnny Russell	1+5	0	0+1	0	0+0	0	0+0	0	7	0
Players who left the club during the 2024–25 season
1	GK	(Ukraine) Yevhen Kucherenko	12+0	0	0+0	0	1+0	0	4+0	0	17	0
18	FW	(Scotland) Kai Fotheringham	0+2	0	0+0	0	0+0	0	0+1	0	3	0
29	MF	(Scotland) Miller Thomson	1+1	0	0+0	0	0+0	0	0+1	0	3	0
30	MF	(Scotland) Lewis O'Donnell	0+0	0	0+0	0	0+0	0	0+0	0	0	0
31	GK	(Scotland) Ruairidh Adams	0+0	0	0+0	0	0+0	0	0+0	0	0	0
35	DF	(England) Charlie Dewar	0+0	0	0+0	0	0+0	0	0+0	0	0	0
41	GK	(Scotland) Lewis Haldane	0+0	0	0+0	0	0+0	0	0+0	0	0	0
44	MF	(Scotland) Calvin Beattie	0+0	0	0+0	0	0+0	0	0+0	0	0	0
47	FW	(Scotland) Harry Welsh	0+0	0	0+0	0	0+0	0	0+0	0	0	0
77	FW	(Sweden) Nikolaj Möller	7+12	0	0+1	1	0+0	0	0+0	0	20	1

== Team statistics ==
=== League table ===
Pos	Team	Pld	W	D	L	GF	GA	GD	Pts	Qualification or relegation (Note: Teams played each other three times (33 matches), before the league was split into two groups (the top six and the bottom six).)
5	Hibernian	38	15	12	11	58	44	+14	57	Qualification for the Conference League second qualifying round (Note: Since the 2025–26 Scottish Cup winners, Celtic, qualified for the Champions League via league position, the spot reserved for the cup winners (Europa League third qualifying round) was passed to the third-placed team, and the spots for the Conference League second qualifying round were moved down one league position.)
6	Falkirk	38	14	7	17	50	62	−12	49	
7	Dundee United	38	10	15	13	49	60	−11	45	
8	Dundee	38	11	9	18	42	61	−19	42	
9	Aberdeen	38	11	7	20	40	55	−15	40	

Rules for classification: 1) Points; 2) Goal difference; 3) Goals scored; 4) Head-to-head points; 5) Head-to-head goal difference; 6) Play-off (only if deciding champion, UEFA competition qualification, second stage group allocation, or relegation).

== Transfers ==
=== Players in ===
Player	From	Fee
(Australia) Zac Sapsford	(Australia) Western Sydney Wanderers	Undisclosed
(Moldova) Iurie Iovu	(Croatia) NK Istra 1961	Undisclosed
(Guinea-Bissau) Panutche Camará	(England) Crawley Town	Free
(Ukraine) Yevhen Kucherenko	(Ukraine) LNZ Cherkasy	Undisclosed
(Netherlands) Bert Esselink	(Poland) Stal Mielec	Free
(Iraq) Dario Naamo	(Austria) St. Pölten	Undisclosed
(Denmark) Julius Eskesen	(Norway) FK Haugesund	Undisclosed
(Sweden) Nikolaj Möller	(Switzerland) St. Gallen	Undisclosed
(Republic of Ireland) Neil Farrugia	(England) Barnsley	Undisclosed
(Australia) Ashley Maynard-Brewer	(England) Charlton Athletic	Undisclosed
(Ghana) Emmanuel Agyei	(Israel) FC Ashdod	Undisclosed
(Scotland) Johnny Russell	Unattached	Free

=== Players out ===
Player	To	Fee
(North Macedonia) David Babunski	(North Macedonia) FK Vardar	Free
(Scotland) Zeke Cameron	(Scotland) Dunfermline Athletic	Free
(Scotland) Allan Campbell	(Scotland) St Mirren	Free
(Scotland) Adam Carnwath	(Scotland) Peterhead	Free
(Scotland) Ross Docherty	(Scotland) Ross County	Free
(Scotland) Declan Gallagher	(Scotland) Ross County	Free
(England) Louis Moult	(England) Crewe Alexandra	Free
(Scotland) Bryan Mwangi	(Scotland) Cowdenbeath	Free
(Scotland) Jack Newman	(Scotland) Peterhead	Free
(Scotland) Ollie Simpson	(Scotland) Stenhousemuir	Free
(Scotland) Tony Watt	(Scotland) Partick Thistle	Free
(Scotland) Glenn Middleton	(England) Doncaster Rovers	Free
(Nigeria) Meshack Ubochioma	(Hungary) Kazincbarcikai	Free
(Scotland) Rory MacLeod	(Scotland) Dunfermline Athletic	Undisclosed
(Bonaire) Jort van der Sande	(Netherlands) SC Cambuur	Undisclosed
(Scotland) Kai Fotheringham	(Scotland) St Johnstone	Undisclosed
(Kenya) Richard Odada	(Romania) UTA Arad	Free
(Ukraine) Yevhen Kucherenko	(Greece) Panetolikos	Undisclosed
(Sweden) Nikolaj Möller	(Norway) Sandefjord	Undisclosed

=== Loans in ===
Player	From	Fee
(Ghana) Isaac Pappoe	(Hungary) Ferencvárosi	Loan
(Sweden) Amar Fatah	(France) Troyes	Loan
(Hungary) Krisztián Keresztes	(Hungary) Nyíregyháza Spartacus	Loan
(Croatia) Ivan Dolček	(Slovakia) Dunajská Streda	Loan
(England) Max Watters	(England) Barnsley	Loan
(England) Luca Stephenson	(England) Liverpool	Loan

=== Loans out ===
Player	To	Fee
(Scotland) Ruairidh Adams	(Scotland) East Fife	Loan
(England) Charlie Dewar	(Scotland) Alloa Athletic	Loan
(Scotland) Lewis O'Donnell	(Scotland) Cove Rangers	Loan
(Scotland) Lewis Haldane	(Scotland) Cowdenbeath	Loan
(Scotland) Miller Thomson	(Scotland) Ross County	Loan
(Scotland) Calvin Beattie	(Scotland) Airdrieonians	Co-operation loan
(Scotland) Samuel Cleall-Harding	(Scotland) Airdrieonians	Co-operation loan
(Scotland) Scott Constable	(Scotland) Airdrieonians	Co-operation loan
(Scotland) Calvin Beattie	(Scotland) Brechin City	Loan
(Scotland) Harry Welsh	(Scotland) Stirling Albion	Loan
(Scotland) Owen Stirton	(Scotland) Airdrieonians	Co-operation loan
(Scotland) Lewis Haldane	(Scotland) Jeanfield Swifts	Loan
