= Zidane Iqbal =

Iraqi footballer (born 2003)

- Iqbal with Iraq in 2025

Personal information
- Full name: Zidane Aamar Iqbal
- Date of birth: 27 April 2003 (age 23)
- Place of birth: Manchester, England
- Height: 1.81 m (5 ft 11 in)
- Position: Midfielder

Team information
- Current team: Dundee United
- Number: 14

Youth career
- Sale United
- –2021: Manchester United

Senior career*
Years	Team	Apps	(Gls)
2021–2023	Manchester United	0	(0)
2023–2026	Jong Utrecht	12	(0)
2023–2026	Utrecht	42	(1)
2026–	Dundee United	8	(1)

International career^{‡}
- Iraq U23
2022–	Iraq	32	(3)
- * Club domestic league appearances and goals as of 08:50, 22 November 2026 (UTC) ‡ National team caps and goals as of 08:55, 22 November 2026 (UTC)

Zidane Aamar Iqbal (Arabic: زیدان عمار اقبال; born 27 April 2003) is a professional footballer who plays as a midfielder for Scottish Premiership club Dundee United. Born in England, he plays for the Iraq national team.

Iqbal joined Manchester United's youth system aged nine. He made his first-team debut, and his only senior appearance for United, in a UEFA Champions League match in December 2021. He signed for Utrecht in 2023, and moved to Dundee United in 2026.

Iqbal represented Iraq at under-23 level, before making his senior international debut in January 2022. He represented Iraq at the 2026 FIFA World Cup.

== Early life ==
Born in Manchester to a Pakistani father and an Iraqi mother, Iqbal played for local side Sale United from the age of four before joining Manchester United at the age of nine. His father originates from Sahiwal, in the Punjab province of Pakistan, while his mother originated from Samawah in southern Iraq.

== Club career ==
=== Manchester United ===
Iqbal signed his first professional contract with Manchester United in April 2021. He made his first-team debut for Manchester United on 8 December 2021 as an 89th-minute substitute in a UEFA Champions League match against Young Boys. Thus, he became the first British-born South Asian, and the first ever British South Asian to play in the Champions League.

=== Utrecht ===
On 23 June 2023, Iqbal announced that he would be leaving Manchester United to join a new club, subject to registration and international clearance. His move to Utrecht was announced and finalised on 26 June, on a four-year contract for an undisclosed fee.

=== Dundee United ===
After three years in the Netherlands, he moved to Scotland, signing for Dundee United on a two-year deal with the club having the option of extending for another year. Iqbal scored his debut goal for the club in a 3-2 home win against Aberdeen.

== International career ==
Iqbal was eligible to represent England, Iraq, and Pakistan at international level.

=== Youth ===
In May 2021, he received an Iraqi passport, and has represented Iraq at youth international level. In June 2021, he was called up to the Iraq under-20 team for the 2021 Arab Cup U-20. However, Manchester United refused to let him travel, due to the COVID-19 pandemic.

In September 2021, Iqbal received his first call up to the Iraq under-23 team for a training camp in the United Arab Emirates. He made his debut on 4 September, against the UAE under-23 team, making the starting line-up. In October 2021, Iqbal was named as part of the 23-man Iraq under-23 squad for the 2021 WAFF U-23 Championship in Saudi Arabia. On 8 October, Iqbal scored his first goal for the under-23 team as the captain of his side.

=== Senior ===
In January 2022, Iqbal was called up to the Iraq national team for the 2022 FIFA World Cup qualifiers against Iran and Lebanon. He made his debut in a 1–0 loss to Iran on 27 January 2022.

On 26 March 2024, Iqbal scored his first international goal during the 2026 FIFA World Cup qualification match against Philippines in a 5–0 away win.

Iqbal was included in Iraq's 26-man squad for the 2026 FIFA World Cup.

== Style of play ==
Iqbal is a versatile midfielder who mostly plays in the centre.

== Personal life ==
As one of a small number of British Asians in association football, Iqbal was part of an FA content series to support South Asian Heritage Month in 2021.

Iqbal is Muslim, and cites Mesut Özil as an inspiration for him. Iqbal has stated in interviews that he is fluent in English and can speak some Punjabi and Arabic.

== Career statistics ==
=== Club ===
As of match played 21 November 2026

Appearances and goals by club, season and competition
Club	Season	League			National cup (Note: Includes KNVB Cup)		League cup		Europe		Other		Total	
Club	Season	Division	Apps	Goals	Apps	Goals	Apps	Goals	Apps	Goals	Apps	Goals	Apps	Goals
Manchester United U21	2021–22	—			—		—		—		3 (Note: Appearances in EFL Trophy)	1	3	1
Manchester United U21	2022–23	—			—		—		—		3	0	3	0
Manchester United U21	Total		0	0	0	0	0	0	0	0	6	1	6	1
Manchester United	2021–22	Premier League	0	0	0	0	0	0	1 (Note: Appearance in UEFA Champions League)	0	—		1	0
Manchester United	2022–23	Premier League	0	0	0	0	0	0	0	0	—		0	0
Manchester United	Total		0	0	0	0	0	0	1	0	0	0	1	0
Jong Utrecht	2023–24	Eerste Divisie	1	0	—		—		—		—		1	0
Jong Utrecht	2025–26	Eerste Divisie	11	0	—		—		—		—		11	0
Jong Utrecht	Total		12	0	0	0	0	0	0	0	0	0	12	0
Utrecht	2023–24	Eredivisie	17	0	1	0	—		—		1 (Note: Appearance in Eredivisie European play-offs)	0	19	0
Utrecht	2024–25	Eredivisie	18	1	3	0	—		—		—		21	1
Utrecht	2025–26	Eredivisie	5	0	0	0	—		2 (Note: Appearances in UEFA Europa League)	0	—		7	0
Utrecht	2026–27	Eredivisie	2	0	0	0	—		—		—		2	0
Utrecht	Total		42	1	4	0	0	0	2	0	1	0	49	1
Dundee United	2026–27	Scottish Premiership	8	1	0	0	0	0	—		—		8	1
Career total			62	2	4	0	0	0	3	0	7	1	76	3

=== International ===
As of match played 17 November 2026

Appearances and goals by national team and year
National team	Year	Apps	Goals
Iraq	2022	2	0
Iraq	2023	2	0
Iraq	2024	13	1
Iraq	2025	5	1
Iraq	2026	10	1
Total		32	3

Scores and results list Iraq's goal tally first.

International goals by date, venue, cap, opponent, score, result and competition
No.	Date	Venue	Cap	Opponent	Score	Result	Competition
1	26 March 2024	Rizal Memorial Stadium, Manila, Philippines	10	Philippines	4–0	5–0	2026 FIFA World Cup qualification
2	11 October 2025	King Abdullah Sports City Stadium, Jeddah, Saudi Arabia	19	Indonesia	1–0	1–0	2026 FIFA World Cup qualification
3	26 September 2026	Prince Abdullah Al-Faisal Sports City Stadium, Jeddah, Saudi Arabia	30	Kuwait	1–0	3–2	27th Arabian Gulf Cup

== Honours ==
Individual

- Eredivisie Team of the Month: December 2024, March 2025
