= 2016–17 Essex Senior Football League =

The 2016–17 season was the 46th in the history of Essex Senior Football League, a football competition in England.

The league featured 19 clubs which competed in the league last season, along with three new clubs.

- Clubs relegated from the Isthmian League:
  - Barkingside
  - Redbridge
- Plus:
  - West Essex, promoted from the Middlesex County League

Also, Greenhouse Sports changed name to Haringey & Waltham.

The following clubs applied for a promotion: Barking, Clapton, FC Romania, Ilford and Waltham Forest.

Barking were champions, winning their first Essex Senior League title and were promoted to the Isthmian League.

== League table ==
Essex Senior Football League
- Season: 2016–17
- Champions: Barking
- Promoted: Barking
- Matches: 462
- Goals: 1,697 (3.67 per match)
- Top goalscorer: Charlie Cole (42 goals)

Pos	Team	Pld	W	D	L	GF	GA	GD	Pts	Promotion
1	Barking	42	32	4	6	125	46	+79	100	Promoted to the Isthmian League
2	Clapton	42	29	5	8	89	46	+43	92	
3	FC Romania	42	27	7	8	125	56	+69	88	
4	Takeley	42	25	8	9	93	51	+42	83	
5	Sawbridgeworth Town	42	25	8	9	98	67	+31	83	
6	Ilford	42	22	9	11	85	56	+29	75	
7	Southend Manor	42	22	5	15	76	56	+20	71	
8	Stansted	42	20	10	12	82	50	+32	70	
9	Basildon United	42	18	7	17	81	72	+9	61	
10	Barkingside	42	19	9	14	81	74	+7	60 (Note: Barkingside were deducted six points for playing two matches "whilst under ECFA suspension".)	
11	Hullbridge Sports	42	16	12	14	72	66	+6	60	
12	Waltham Forest	42	17	8	17	67	67	0	59	
13	West Essex	42	17	7	18	77	79	−2	58	
14	Redbridge	42	16	7	19	93	87	+6	55	
15	Wadham Lodge	42	13	10	19	56	75	−19	49	
16	Eton Manor	42	14	4	24	74	98	−24	46	Resigned from the league
17	London Bari	42	12	8	22	59	88	−29	44	
18	Enfield 1893	42	12	6	24	69	114	−45	42	
19	Sporting Bengal United	42	11	6	25	65	95	−30	39	
20	Tower Hamlets	42	6	6	30	47	100	−53	24	
21	Burnham Ramblers	42	5	6	31	45	130	−85	21	
22	Haringey & Waltham	42	4	8	30	38	124	−86	20	

Source: FA Full-Time
Rules for classification: 1) Points; 2) Goal difference; 3) Number of goals scored; 4) Number of matches won; 5) Head-to-head results
