= Luca Stephenson =

English footballer (born 2002)

Personal information
- Full name: Luca Bobby Stephenson
- Date of birth: 17 September 2003 (age 23)
- Place of birth: Horden, England
- Height: 1.78 m (5 ft 10 in)
- Positions: Right-back; right wing-back; defensive midfielder

Team information
- Current team: Bolton Wanderers
- Number: 27

Youth career
- –2018: Sunderland
- 2018–2023: Liverpool

Senior career*
| Years | Team | Apps | (Gls) |
| 2023–2026 | Liverpool | 0 | (0) |
| 2023–2024 | → Barrow (loan) | 30 | (0) |
| 2024–2026 | → Dundee United (loan) | 60 | (8) |
| 2026– | Bolton Wanderers | 1 | (0) |
- * Club domestic league appearances and goals as of 4 April 2026

Luca Bobby Stephenson (born 17 September 2003) is an English professional footballer who plays as a right-back or defensive midfielder for EFL Championship club Bolton Wanderers.

== Career ==
=== Early career ===
Stephenson started his career in Sunderland's academy, before signing for Liverpool in September 2018.

Stephenson captained Liverpool's under-18 team for the 2020–21 season, going on to also captain the under-21 side, becoming a regular with them in the following season.

During his time in Liverpool's academy, Stephenson was versatile, playing at both centre-back and right-back in addition to his natural midfield role.

=== Liverpool ===
Stephenson signed his first professional contract in September 2020, with his deal being extended in February 2022.

==== Loan to Barrow ====
On 1 September 2023, Stephenson joined EFL League Two club Barrow on a season-long loan. On 5 September, he made his professional debut in an EFL Trophy fixture against Blackpool. He later made his professional league debut on 30 September against Doncaster Rovers, coming on as a substitute for Tyrell Warren in the 62nd minute. On 14 October 2023, Stephenson made his full league debut at right-wing-back as Barrow faced Milton Keynes Dons, being replaced after 46 minutes.

During his time at Barrow, Stephenson was mainly deployed on the right of a back-five, with his hard-working and tough tackling style making him popular amongst fans. He became a regular in a Barrow team that narrowly missed-out on the League Two English Football League play-offs by a single point, one of their best league finishes in a 122-year history.

==== Loan to Dundee United ====
On 15 August 2024, Stephenson signed for newly promoted Scottish Premiership side Dundee United on a season-long loan. He debuted for the club three days later in a Scottish League Cup match against St Mirren. On 24 August, he made his league debut and scored his first professional goal in a 2–0 win over St Johnstone. His season was cut short due to injury, a double hernia which required surgery. An injury he’d played with for 4 months, to secure Dundee United a top 4 finish and a place in Europe. Stephenson was awarded both fans & clubs Young Player of the season.

On 14 August 2025, Stephenson signed a long term contract extension with Liverpool before extending his loan at Dundee United for an additional season.

=== Bolton Wanderers ===
On 2 July 2026, Stephenson completed a permanent move to EFL Championship club Bolton Wanderers for an undisclosed fee on a four-year deal.

== Career statistics ==
As of match played 4 April 2026

Appearances and goals by club, season and competition
| Club | Season | League | | | National cup (Note: Includes FA Cup) | | League cup (Note: Includes Scottish League Cup) | | Other | | Total | |
| Club | Season | Division | Apps | Goals | Apps | Goals | Apps | Goals | Apps | Goals | Apps | Goals |
|---|---|---|---|---|---|---|---|---|---|---|---|---|
| Barrow (loan) | 2023–24 | EFL League Two | 30 | 0 | 2 | 0 | 0 | 0 | 2 (Note: Appearance in EFL Trophy) | 0 | 34 | 0 |
| Dundee United (loan) | 2024–25 | Scottish Premiership | 31 | 3 | 1 | 0 | 2 | 0 | 0 | 0 | 34 | 3 |
| Dundee United (loan) | 2025–26 | Scottish Premiership | 29 | 5 | 3 | 0 | 1 | 0 | 0 | 0 | 33 | 5 |
| Dundee United (loan) | Total | | 60 | 8 | 4 | 0 | 3 | 0 | 0 | 0 | 67 | 8 |
| Bolton Wanderers | 2026–27 | EFL Championship | 1 | 0 | 0 | 0 | 1 | 0 | 0 | 0 | 2 | 0 |
| Career total | | | 91 | 8 | 6 | 0 | 4 | 0 | 2 | 0 | 103 | 8 |
