= Kevin Ciubotaru =

Italian footballer (born 2004)

Personal information
- Full name: Kevin Andrei Ciubotaru
- Date of birth: 2 February 2004 (age 22)
- Place of birth: Rome, Italy
- Height: 1.84 m (6 ft 0 in)
- Position: Left-back

Team information
- Current team: Dundee United
- Number: 19

Youth career
- 2012–2014: Città di Ciampino
- 2014–2019: Rapid Wien
- 2015: → FV Austria XIII (loan)
- 2015–2018: → Admira Wacker (loan)
- 2018–2019: → TWL Elektra (loan)
- 2019–2020: AVA Football Club
- 2020–2021: Parma
- 2021–2022: Kinetic Academy
- 2022–2023: Rangers

Senior career*
| Years | Team | Apps | (Gls) |
| 2022–2023 | Rangers B | 12 | (0) |
| 2023–2026 | Hermannstadt | 37 | (0) |
| 2024–2025 | → Unirea Ungheni (loan) | 14 | (0) |
| 2026– | Dundee United | 8 | (1) |

International career^{‡}
| 2018 | Romania U15 | 3 | (0) |
| 2019 | Romania U16 | 1 | (0) |
| 2025–2026 | Romania U21 | 7 | (1) |
| 2025– | Romania | 1 | (0) |
- * Club domestic league appearances and goals as of 8 November 2026 ‡ National team caps and goals as of 6 October 2026

Kevin Andrei Ciubotaru (born 2 February 2004) is a Romanian professional footballer who plays as a left-back for Scottish Premiership club Dundee United.

== Club career ==
Ciubotaru’s early football journey took him from Italy to Austria, where he had a brief stint at Rapid Vienna. However, he moved to the UK in search of better opportunities.

In England, Kevin joined Ava Football Club, a Romanian-run football school in London, and began attending trials with clubs such as Chelsea, Tottenham Hotspur and others.

Eventually Ciubotaru was invited to join Rangers and signed a contract with the club until the summer of 2023, initially joining the U21 squad.

In the summer of 2023, Kevin Ciubotaru, then 19 years old, signed a three-year contract with Hermannstadt after spending the preseason training with Dinamo Bucharest. Although he had initially agreed to join Dinamo — having passed the trial and completed the medical. As a result, Ciubotaru opted to join Hermannstadt, who offered him a firm deal following Raul Opruț’s departure.

== International career ==
Ciubotaru has represented Romania at various youth levels throughout his career.

On 9 October 2025, Ciubotaru made his senior debut for the Romania national football team in a friendly match against Moldova. His strong internal performances convinced coach Mircea Lucescu to call him up.

== Style of play ==
Ciubotaru mainly operates as a dynamic, modern left-back known for his direct, high-energy approach down the left flank.

== Personal life ==
He was born to Romanian parents. His father, Silviu Ciubotaru, supported a local amateur team from Rome called Dacica, where Kevin first began playing. Ciubotaru eventually joined a church-affiliated team, participating in an old inter-congregational tournament.

He is a fan of Roma, Dinamo București and Arsenal. Ciubotaru is also a fan of Theo Hernández, calling him his idol.

== Career statistics ==
=== Club ===
As of 25 October 2026

Appearances and goals by club, season and competition
| Club | Season | League | | | National Cup | | Europe | | Other | | Total | |
| Club | Season | Division | Apps | Goals | Apps | Goals | Apps | Goals | Apps | Goals | Apps | Goals |
|---|---|---|---|---|---|---|---|---|---|---|---|---|
| Rangers B | 2022–23 | Lowland Football League | 12 | 0 | — | | — | | — | | 12 | 0 |
| Hermannstadt | 2023–24 | Liga I | 3 | 0 | 4 | 0 | — | | — | | 7 | 0 |
| Hermannstadt | 2024–25 | Liga I | 0 | 0 | 1 | 0 | — | | — | | 1 | 0 |
| Hermannstadt | 2025–26 | Liga I | 34 | 0 | 3 | 0 | — | | 2 (Note: Appearances in Liga I promotion/relegation play-offs) | 0 | 39 | 0 |
| Hermannstadt | Total | | 37 | 0 | 8 | 0 | — | | 2 | 0 | 47 | 0 |
| Unirea Ungheni (loan) | 2024–25 | Liga II | 14 | 0 | 2 | 0 | — | | — | | 16 | 0 |
| Dundee United | 2026–27 | Scottish Premiership | 7 | 1 | 0 | 0 | — | | 1 (Note: Appearance in Scottish League Cup) | 0 | 8 | 1 |
| Career total | | | 70 | 1 | 10 | 0 | — | | 3 | 0 | 83 | 1 |

=== International ===
As of match played 9 October 2025.

Appearances and goals by national team and year
| National team | Year | Apps | Goals |
|---|---|---|---|
Romania
| Romania | 2025 | 1 | 0 |
| Total | | 1 | 0 |
