= Max Watters =

English footballer (born 1999)

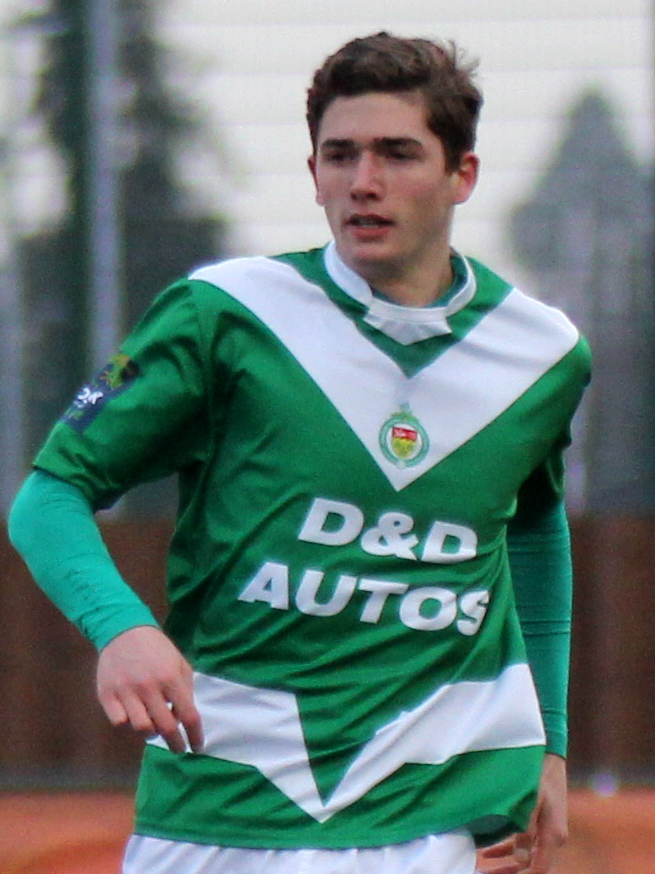
- Watters with Ashford United in January 2018

Personal information
- Full name: Max James Watters
- Date of birth: 23 March 1999 (age 27)
- Place of birth: Camden, London, England
- Height: 6 ft 1 in (1.86 m)
- Position: Striker

Team information
- Current team: Port Vale
- Number: 36

Senior career*
Years	Team	Apps	(Gls)
2016–2017	Thurrock	0	(0)
2017	→ Barking (loan)	11	(3)
2017–2018	Ashford United	25	(8)
2018–2020	Doncaster Rovers	5	(0)
2018	→ Grantham Town (loan)	17	(4)
2019	→ Gainsborough Trinity (loan)	4	(1)
2019	→ Mickleover Sports (loan)	6	(1)
2020	→ Maidstone United (loan)	4	(0)
2020–2021	Crawley Town	15	(13)
2021–2023	Cardiff City	22	(1)
2021	→ Milton Keynes Dons (loan)	11	(5)
2023	→ Barnsley (loan)	19	(4)
2023–2026	Barnsley	54	(8)
2025–2026	→ Dundee United (loan)	24	(2)
2026–	Port Vale	8	(0)

International career
2017	England Schoolboys		
- * Club domestic league appearances and goals as of 10:24, 22 November 2026 (UTC)

Max James Watters (born 23 March 1999) is an English professional footballer who plays as a striker for EFL League Two club Port Vale.

Watters started his career playing non-League football with Thurrock, Barking (on loan) and Ashford United before signing for League One side Doncaster Rovers in May 2018. Following loan spells at Grantham Town, Gainsborough Trinity, Mickleover Sports and Maidstone United, he was released by Doncaster Rovers at the end of the 2019–20 season. He signed for League Two club Crawley Town in October 2020, moving to Championship club Cardiff City in January 2021. He had loan spells at Milton Keynes Dons and Barnsley before he joined Barnsley permanently in July 2023. He spent the 2025–26 season on loan at Scottish Premiership club Dundee United and joined Port Vale on a free transfer in July 2026.

== Early and personal life ==
Born in Camden, Watters attended Hall Mead School and Shenfield High School. Lee Thomas, Shenfield High School football academy director, said that Watters "helped the team to the national cup final in 2016 and broke the record for most goals scored in a single game with seven against Romford".

== Club career ==
=== Early career ===
Watters began his career in non-League football with Thurrock, Barking and Ashford United. He never made a first-team appearance for Thurrock. With Barking, he scored three goals in 11 league games and three goals in four cup games. Barking won the Essex Senior League title at the end of the 2016–17 season. He was then initially a non-contract player at Ashford United and signed for them in December 2017 after scoring a hat-trick against Thamesmead Town. He missed the final three months of the 2017–18 season with an ankle injury. With Ashford, he scored eight goals in 25 Isthmian League South Division games; he also made a further two cup appearances, without scoring. He worked for his father's company as a removal man during his time as an amateur and semi-professional player.

=== Doncaster Rovers ===
On 22 May 2018, Watters signed his first professional contract with Doncaster Rovers, joining the club on a two-year deal for an undisclosed fee. He stated that Doncaster was "such a friendly club" and that "the manager (Darren Ferguson) likes to give young players a chance". He moved on loan to Northern Premier League Premier Division side Grantham Town in August 2018. He was given a six-match suspension by the FA for violent conduct after the end of a fixture with Daventry Town in September. He scored four goals in 21 games in all competitions for Grantham Town. He then joined Grantham's league rivals Gainsborough Trinity on 18 January 2019 on a month-long loan. He scored on his debut for the club the following day with the only goal of a 1–0 win over Mickleover Sports. He played three further times for Trinity.

In September 2019, he moved on loan to Mickleover Sports. He scored one goal in six Northern Premier League Premier Division games for Mickleover. He made his senior debut for Doncaster on 29 October 2019 in the EFL Trophy, before making his League One debut on 7 December as a substitute in a 1–1 draw with Milton Keynes Dons at Keepmoat. On 21 February 2020, he moved to Maidstone United on a month-long loan. He made his National League South debut for the club the following day, starting in a 2–1 defeat to Hampton & Richmond Borough at the Gallagher Stadium. He failed to score in four league appearances whilst at Maidstone United. Doncaster manager Darren Moore identified Watters as one of the young players the club hoped to develop in and around the under-23 and first-team squads. However, he was released by Doncaster at the end of the 2019–20 season, having made five league appearances for the club. Rovers also disbanded their under-23 side amid the financial effects of the COVID-19 pandemic. Maidstone manager Hakan Hayrettin said that he had attempted to sign Watters permanently but that circumstances and competition from other clubs prevented a deal, describing him as "the one who got away".

=== Crawley Town ===
Following his release by Doncaster, Watters had trials with Maidstone United, Bromley and Dagenham & Redbridge. He subsequently joined League Two club Crawley Town on trial after appearing against them for Maidstone in a September 2020 friendly. On 10 October, he signed for Crawley Town on a one-year contract with the option of a further year. He scored on his Crawley debut on 13 October in an EFL Trophy tie against Arsenal U21s. He then scored twice on his league debut in a 4–0 victory over Morecambe at the Broadfield Stadium four days later. After scoring five goals in five League Two games for Crawley in October 2020, he was nominated for the League Two Player of the Month award, though it was awarded to Cambridge United striker Paul Mullin. Crawley's signing of Watters was praised by former footballer Stephen Warnock (appearing on the EFL on Quest TV show) as a "terrific piece of recruitment". Having scored six league goals in December 2020, including a brace as a substitute against Mansfield Town and a hat-trick against Barrow, he was awarded the League Two Player of the Month award for December. He dedicated the award to his teammates and the management of John Yems and Lee Bradbury. He subsequently trained with Swansea City the following month, whose bid for him was rejected by Crawley. He played his last game for Crawley in the FA Cup as they defeated Premier League side Leeds United 3–0 in a televised game and was labelled as "the most valuable striker in England" by technical director Erdem Konyar. He scored 16 goals in 19 games in the first half of the 2020–21 campaign.

=== Cardiff City ===
He signed for Cardiff City on 16 January 2021 on a three-and-a-half-year contract for an undisclosed fee. Crawley manager John Yems later suggested the fee was £1 million. Cardiff manager Neil Harris said that he was "a natural finisher". However, Harris was sacked not long afterwards and The Yorkshire Post later reported that Watters was not highly regarded by Harris's successor, Mick McCarthy. McCarthy instead used midfielders Sheyi Ojo and Josh Murphy in attacking roles alongside Kieffer Moore. Cardiff looked to offload him in the summer and Peterborough United were closely linked with a move.

On 8 July 2021, Watters joined League One side Milton Keynes Dons on loan for the duration of the 2021–22 season. Dons manager Russell Martin had attempted to sign him before his move to Cardiff. After missing the start of the season through injury, Watters scored his first goal for the club on 18 September in a 4–1 away win over Gillingham. He was also sidelined with injury for the final month of his loan spell. On 30 December, Cardiff City activated a clause to return Watters from his loan at Stadium MK early, having scored seven goals in 14 appearances in all competitions for MK Dons. He said the loan spell had helped him "to mature and become a better player" as he fitted in well to manager Liam Manning's team.

Following his return, on 22 January, Watters scored his first goal for Cardiff in his first game back for the club in a 3–2 defeat away to Severnside derby rivals Bristol City. However, he was substituted 37 minutes into a game against Coventry City on 15 February as manager Steve Morison said "he just wasn't good enough" and his performance had lacked the physicality required at Championship level. Morison said the two had a "brilliant" meeting after the match and the player would remain involved with the first-team, later adding "I see a lot of myself in him". He was then sidelined for six weeks with an ankle injury. Watters fell out of first-team contention at the Cardiff City Stadium following Morison's sacking.

=== Barnsley ===
On 5 January 2023, Watters returned to League One to join Barnsley on loan until the end of the 2022–23 season. Cardiff manager Mark Hudson said that "Barnsley have knocked down the door for him to go there". He scored his first goal for Barnsley on 11 February in a 2–0 win against Cambridge United, but was later sent off in the same match. Manager Michael Duff revealed that Watters had a toe injury, in addition to his three-match suspension, which would keep him sidelined until March. He featured as an extra-time substitute in the play-off final defeat to Sheffield Wednesday at Wembley Stadium, and played a total of 21 times, scoring four goals, during his loan with the club.

He joined Barnsley permanently in July 2023 for an undisclosed fee, signing a three-year contract with the option of a further year. He hit four goals in 29 matches during the 2023–24 campaign. He picked up a muscle injury against Cambridge United in November 2024. Manager Darrell Clarke said that he expected Watters to be sidelined for several weeks rather than months. He finished the 2024–25 season with six goals in 34 games.

On 18 July 2025, Watters joined Scottish Premiership club Dundee United on a season-long loan. Manager Jim Goodwin said he had been "one of our top targets for the summer window". He scored four goals in August before suffering an injury at Tannadice that sidelined him for three months. He ended the 2025–26 season with five goals in 32 games, having spent time on the sidelines with a hamstring injury. Barnsley released him upon his return to Oakwell.

=== Port Vale ===
On 16 July 2026, Watters moved on a free transfer to League Two club Port Vale and signed a two-year contract. He missed the start of the 2026–27 season due to a hip issue.

== International career ==
Watters has represented England Schoolboys. He made his debut against Australia on 28 January 2017. He scored two goals against Republic of Ireland on 13 April.

== Style of play ==
Maidstone United manager Hakan Hayrettin described Watters in 2020 as a quick and strong centre-forward with an eye for goal.

== Career statistics ==
As of match played 21 November 2026

Appearances and goals by club, season and competition
Club	Season	League			National cup (Note: Includes FA Cup, Scottish Cup)		League cup (Note: Includes EFL Cup, Scottish League Cup)		Other		Total	
Club	Season	Division	Apps	Goals	Apps	Goals	Apps	Goals	Apps	Goals	Apps	Goals
Thurrock	2016–17	Isthmian League; Division One North	0	0	0	0	—		0	0	0	0
Barking (loan)	2016–17	Essex Senior League	11	3	0	0	—		4	3	15	6
Ashford United	2017–18	Isthmian League; South Division	25	8	0	0	—		2 (Note: One appearance in the Alan Turvey Trophy and one appearance in the FA Trophy)	0	27	8
Doncaster Rovers	2018–19	League One	0	0	0	0	0	0	0	0	0	0
Doncaster Rovers	2019–20	League One	5	0	0	0	0	0	1 (Note: Appearance(s) in the EFL Trophy)	0	6	0
Doncaster Rovers	Total		5	0	0	0	0	0	1	0	6	0
Grantham Town (loan)	2018–19	Northern Premier League; Premier Division	17	4	3	0	—		1	0	21	4
Gainsborough Trinity (loan)	2018–19	Northern Premier League; Premier Division	4	1	—		—		0	0	4	1
Mickleover Sports (loan)	2019–20	Northern Premier League; Premier Division	6	1	—		—		1 (Note: Appearance(s) in the FA Trophy)	0	7	1
Maidstone United (loan)	2019–20	National League South	4	0	—		—		—		4	0
Crawley Town	2020–21	League Two	15	13	3	2	0	0	1	1	19	16
Cardiff City	2020–21	Championship	3	0	—		—		—		3	0
Cardiff City	2021–22	Championship	8	1	0	0	0	0	—		8	1
Cardiff City	2022–23	Championship	11	0	0	0	0	0	—		11	0
Cardiff City	Total		22	1	0	0	0	0	0	0	22	1
Milton Keynes Dons (loan)	2021–22	League One	11	5	2	1	0	0	1	1	14	7
Barnsley (loan)	2022–23	League One	19	4	0	0	—		2 (Note: Appearance(s) in the play-offs)	0	21	4
Barnsley	2023–24	League One	24	3	2	1	0	0	3	0	29	4
Barnsley	2024–25	League One	30	5	1	0	3	1	0	0	34	6
Barnsley	2025–26	League One	0	0	0	0	0	0	0	0	0	0
Barnsley	Total		54	8	3	1	3	1	3	0	63	10
Dundee United (loan)	2025–26	Scottish Premiership	24	2	3	0	1	0	4 (Note: Appearances in the UEFA Conference League)	3	32	5
Port Vale	2026–27	League Two	8	0	1	1	0	0	3	1	12	2
Career total			225	50	15	5	4	1	23	9	267	65

== Honours ==
Barking

- Essex Senior Football League: 2016–17

Individual

- EFL League Two Player of the Month: December 2020
