= Nikolaj Möller =

Swedish footballer (born 2002)

Personal information
- Full name: Nikolaj Duus Möller
- Date of birth: 20 July 2002 (age 24)
- Place of birth: Helsingborg, Sweden
- Height: 1.94 m (6 ft 4 in)
- Position: Forward

Team information
- Current team: Sandefjord
- Number: 11

Youth career
- –2015: Ramlösa Södra
- 2015–2018: Malmö FF
- 2018–2019: Bologna
- 2020: Malmö FF
- 2020–2021: Arsenal

Senior career*
Years	Team	Apps	(Gls)
2021–2023	Arsenal	0	(0)
2021–2022	→ Viktoria Köln (loan)	10	(0)
2022–2023	→ Den Bosch (loan)	33	(6)
2023–2025	St. Gallen	20	(1)
2024–2025	→ Strømsgodset (loan)	22	(4)
2025–2026	Dundee United	19	(0)
2026–	Sandefjord	12	(3)

International career^{‡}
2020	Sweden U18	2	(0)
2021	Sweden U20	2	(0)
- * Club domestic league appearances and goals as of 17 July 2026 ‡ National team caps and goals as of 14 November 2021

Nikolaj Duus Möller (born 20 July 2002) is a Swedish professional footballer who plays as a forward for Eliteserien club Sandefjord.

== Club career ==
Born in Helsingborg, Sweden, Möller joined Malmö FF's youth academy at the age of 13. He joined Bologna's youth set-up in summer 2018 but returned to Malmö in January 2020.

On 6 October 2020, it was announced that Möller had joined Premier League club Arsenal on a four-year contract for a fee of around £450,000, with the player initially joining the club's Professional Development Phase. In July 2021, Möller joined Viktoria Köln in Germany's 3. Liga on a season-long loan. He made his senior debut on 31 July 2021, starting in a 1–1 league draw with FSV Zwickau.

On 3 January 2022, Arsenal exercised their option and recalled Moller early from his loan at Viktoria Koln. On 31 January, Arsenal announced they had loaned Moller to Eerste Divisie side FC Den Bosch for the remainder of the 2021–22 season. In July 2022 he returned to Den Bosch on a season-long loan.

On 20 June 2023, Möller joined FC St. Gallen on a permanent deal for an undisclosed fee.

In summer 2024, he joined Strømsgodset on a year-long loan deal.

On 23 August 2025, Möller signed for Scottish Premiership club Dundee United, on a two-year contract with the option for an additional year.

On 12 February 2026, signed for Eliteserien club Sandefjord on a three-year contract for an undisclosed fee.

== International career ==
Möller has represented Sweden at under-18 level.

== Career statistics ==
As of 17 July 2026

Appearances and goals by club, season and competition
Club	Season	League			National Cup		League Cup		Other		Total	
Club	Season	Division	Apps	Goals	Apps	Goals	Apps	Goals	Apps	Goals	Apps	Goals
Arsenal U21	2020–21	—			—		—		2 (Note: Appearance(s) in EFL Trophy)	0	2	0
Arsenal	2021–22	Premier League	0	0	0	0	0	0	0	0	0	0
Arsenal	2022–23	Premier League	0	0	0	0	0	0	0	0	0	0
Arsenal	Total		0	0	0	0	0	0	2	0	2	0
Viktoria Köln (loan)	2021–22	3. Liga	10	0	1	0	—		0	0	11	0
FC Den Bosch (loan)	2021–22	Eerste Divisie	11	2	0	0	—		0	0	11	2
FC Den Bosch (loan)	2022–23	Eerste Divisie	22	4	2	1	—		0	0	24	5
FC Den Bosch (loan)	Total		33	6	2	1	0	0	0	0	35	7
St. Gallen	2023–24	Swiss Super League	19	1	2	0	—		0	0	21	1
St. Gallen	2024–25	Swiss Super League	1	0	0	0	0	0	1	0	2	0
St. Gallen	Total		20	1	2	0	0	0	1	0	23	1
Strømsgodset (loan)	2024	Eliteserien	12	3	0	0	—		0	0	12	3
Strømsgodset (loan)	2025	Eliteserien	10	1	2	1	—		0	0	12	2
Strømsgodset (loan)	Total		22	4	2	1	0	0	0	0	24	5
Dundee United	2025–26	Scottish Premiership	19	0	1	1	0	0	0	0	20	1
Sandefjord	2026	Eliteserien	12	3	0	0	—		0	0	12	3
Career total			116	14	8	3	0	0	3	0	127	20
