= Ross Graham (footballer) =

Scottish footballer

- Graham with Dundee United in 2026

Personal information
- Full name: Ross James Graham
- Date of birth: 23 February 2001 (age 25)
- Place of birth: Blairgowrie, Scotland
- Height: 6 ft 6 in (1.97 m)
- Position: Central defender

Team information
- Current team: Dundee United
- Number: 6

Youth career
- Blairgowrie & Rattray Community
- Dundee West
- 2012–18: Dundee United

Senior career*
Years	Team	Apps	(Gls)
2018–	Dundee United	84	(9)
2020	→ Elgin City (loan)	8	(0)
2020–2021	→ Cove Rangers (loan)	24	(0)
2021–2022	→ Dunfermline Athletic (loan)	9	(0)

International career
2022	Scotland U21	3	(1)
- * Club domestic league appearances and goals as of 29 December 2025

Ross James Graham (born 23 February 2001) is a Scottish professional footballer who plays as a central defender for Scottish Premiership club Dundee United. He has also played for Elgin City, Cove Rangers and Dunfermline Athletic on loan before making his Premiership debut for Dundee United in 2022.

== Early life ==
Graham was born in Blairgowrie, Perth and Kinross, where he attended Newhill Primary School. He began playing football at Blairgowrie & Rattray Community F.C. From 2013 he attended St John's Roman Catholic High School in Dundee where he was part of the Scottish Football Association (SFA) Performance School Programme.

== Personal life ==
Ross Graham is the son of former footballer who shares his son's name as James Ross Graham his dad played football as a striker for Scottish clubs such as East Fife, Arbroath and Montrose.

== Career ==
=== Club ===
As well as progressing through the SFA programme, Graham joined the Dundee United Academy in 2012 from Dundee West. He was initially an attacking midfielder before being converted to a central defender. After impressing for the club's under-17 team, he signed a professional contract in July 2018. Early in the 2018–19 season, he made two first team appearances as youthful United teams faced St Johnstone Colts and Alloa Athletic in the Scottish Challenge Cup.

In September 2019, Graham signed a new three-year contract with Dundee United. After being an unused substitute for the first team on several occasions, he joined Scottish League Two club Elgin City on loan in January 2020 for the rest of the 2019–20 season. He made eight appearances for Elgin before the season was cut short due to the COVID-19 pandemic.

Graham began the 2020–21 season training with Dundee United's first team squad before going on loan again, joining League One club Cove Rangers in October for the rest of the season. He made 23 appearances for Cove in all competitions. In July 2021 he signed a further three-year contract extension with Dundee United and then immediately departed on another season's loan, with Championship club Dunfermline Athletic.

At Dunfermline, Graham played in the first seven matches of the season, but after only one further appearance and a change of manager at the club, his loan was cut short in January 2022. Returning to Dundee United, he made his league debut for the club as a substitute against Celtic in a 1–0 Scottish Premiership defeat at Celtic Park on 29 January 2022.

=== International ===
Graham played three times for the Scotland under-21 team during 2022, scoring one goal.

== Career statistics ==
=== Club ===
As of match played 30 March 2025

Appearances and goals by club, season and competition
Club	Season	League			Scottish Cup		Scottish League Cup		Other		Total	
Club	Season	Division	Apps	Goals	Apps	Goals	Apps	Goals	Apps	Goals	Apps	Goals
Dundee United	2018–19	Scottish Championship	0	0	0	0	0	0	2 (Note: Appearance(s) in Scottish Challenge Cup)	0	2	0
Dundee United	2019–20	Scottish Championship	0	0	0	0	0	0	0	0	0	0
Dundee United	2020–21	Scottish Premiership	0	0	0	0	0	0	0	0	0	0
Dundee United	2021–22	Scottish Premiership	15	2	2	0	0	0	—		17	2
Dundee United	2022–23	Scottish Premiership	15	0	1	0	1	0	—		17	0
Dundee United	2023–24	Scottish Championship	18	1	0	0	3	0	3	0	24	1
Dundee United	2024–25	Scottish Premiership	15	4	1	0	6	1	—		22	5
Dundee United	2025–26	Scottish Premiership	0	0	0	0	0	0	—		0	0
Dundee United	Total		63	7	4	0	10	1	5	0	82	8
Elgin City (loan)	2019–20	Scottish League Two	8	0	—		—		—		8	0
Cove Rangers (loan)	2020–21	Scottish League One	15	0	2	0	4	0	2 (Note: Appearance(s) in Scottish Championship play-offs)	0	23	0
Dunfermline Athletic (loan)	2021–22	Scottish Championship	4	0	0	0	5	0	0	0	9	0
Career total			90	7	6	0	19	1	7	0	122	8
