= Panutche Camará =

Bissau-Guinean footballer (born 1997)

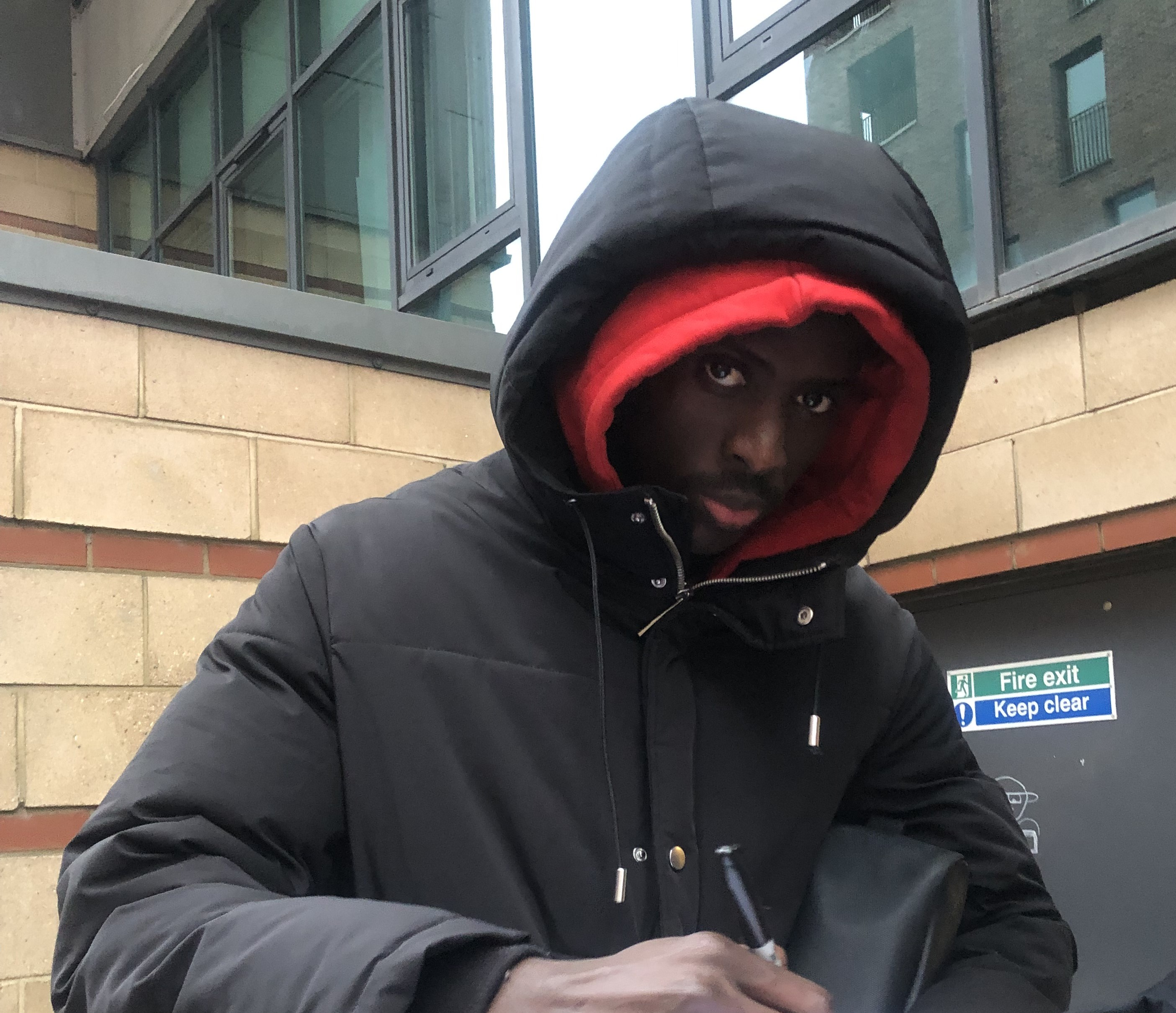
- Camará in 2024

Personal information
- Full name: Panutche Amadu Pereira Camará
- Date of birth: 28 February 1997 (age 29)
- Place of birth: Canchungo, Guinea-Bissau
- Height: 1.85 m (6 ft 1 in)
- Positions: Midfielder; forward

Team information
- Current team: Dundee United
- Number: 8

Youth career
- 2014–2015: Loures
- 2015–2016: Vitória de Guimarães
- 2016–2017: Barnsley

Senior career*
Years	Team	Apps	(Gls)
2017	Dulwich Hamlet	9	(4)
2017–2020	Crawley Town	103	(6)
2020–2022	Plymouth Argyle	80	(6)
2022–2024	Ipswich Town	1	(0)
2023–2024	→ Charlton Athletic (loan)	12	(0)
2024–2025	Crawley Town	42	(4)
2025–	Dundee United	39	(0)

International career^{‡}
2022–	Guinea-Bissau	8	(1)
- * Club domestic league appearances and goals as of 08:43, 22 November 2026 (UTC) ‡ National team caps and goals as of 11:10, 1 January 2026 (UTC)

Panutche Amadu Pereira Camará (born 28 February 1997) is a Bissau-Guinean professional footballer who plays as a midfielder and forward for Scottish club Dundee United and the Guinea-Bissau national team.

== Club career ==
=== Early career ===
After playing youth football for Loures and Vitória de Guimarães, Camará joined the under-23 setup at Barnsley before signing for Dulwich Hamlet in 2017. He made 15 appearances for Hamlet, scoring four goals.

=== Crawley Town ===
Camará signed a two-year professional contract with Crawley Town in June 2017. He scored his first goal for Crawley on his debut in a 5–1 EFL Cup defeat at Birmingham City on 8 August 2017. In 2017–18, he made 34 appearances in all competitions, scoring three goals. In 2018–19, he appeared regularly for the Reds, making 50 appearances in all competitions, also scoring three goals. In May 2019, Crawley extended his contract to the end of the 2019–20 season. He was offered a new contract by Crawley at the end of the 2019–20 season, though Camará rejected the offer and chose to leave the club.

=== Plymouth Argyle ===
On 7 August 2020, Camará signed for Plymouth Argyle on a free transfer following his release from Crawley. He scored his first goal for Plymouth in an EFL Cup tie against Leyton Orient on 15 September 2020. Plymouth exercised their option to extend Camará's contract at the end of the 2021–22 season. Despite this, Camará was made available for transfer with him showing no intent of signing a new improved contract with the club.

=== Ipswich Town ===
Camará signed for Ipswich Town on 1 September 2022 on a two-year deal for a fee reported to be around £500,000. Having initially been sidelined with a groin injury early in the season, Camará made his Ipswich debut as a half-time substitute in a 0–1 EFL Trophy defeat away against Cambridge United on 18 October 2022. He scored his first goal for the club in his next appearance, coming off the bench to score in a 3–0 away win against Bracknell Town in an FA Cup first round tie on 7 November. He made his league debut for Ipswich five days later, coming on as a second-half substitute in a 1–1 home draw against Cheltenham Town at Portman Road. In December, Camará underwent surgery on the groin injury he had been suffering with during the season, ruling him out of action for a number of months. He returned from injury in March, featuring for Ipswich's under-21 team during the remaining months of the season. In total, he made 4 appearances during an injury hindered first season at Ipswich scoring once. Ipswich achieved promotion to the EFL Championship during his first season at the club following a second-placed finish in EFL League One.

On 18 July 2023, Camará joined Charlton Athletic on a season-long loan for the 2023–24 campaign. Camará was released by Ipswich at the end of the 2023–24 season.

=== Return to Crawley Town ===
On 6 August 2024, it was announced that Camará had rejoined former club Crawley Town, now competing in League One, on a two-year deal. His first appearance came as a substitute in a 2–1 League One victory over Blackpool on 10 August.

=== Dundee United ===
In June 2025 he transferred to Scottish club Dundee United, signing a two-year contract.

== International career ==
In June 2021, Camará received his first international call-up from Guinea-Bissau for a friendly against Cape Verde, but the match was cancelled after a fault with the Cape Verde plane meant they could not get to the game. He was named in Guinea-Bissau's 24-man squad for the 2021 Africa Cup of Nations. He debuted with them in a 0–0 2021 Africa Cup of Nations tie with Sudan on 11 January 2022.

He scored his first international goal in a friendly match against Equatorial Guinea on 23 March 2022.

== Career statistics ==
=== Club ===
As of match played 21 November 2026

Appearances and goals by club, season and competition
Club	Season	League			National Cup		League Cup		Other		Total	
Club	Season	Division	Apps	Goals	Apps	Goals	Apps	Goals	Apps	Goals	Apps	Goals
Dulwich Hamlet	2016–17	Isthmian League Premier Division	9	4	0	0	—		6	0	15	4
Crawley Town	2017–18	League Two	29	2	1	0	1	1	3 (Note: Appearance(s) in the EFL Trophy.)	0	34	3
Crawley Town	2018–19	League Two	45	3	2	0	1	0	2	0	50	3
Crawley Town	2019–20	League Two	29	1	1	0	3	0	1	0	34	1
Crawley Town	Total		103	6	4	0	5	1	6	0	118	7
Plymouth Argyle	2020–21	League One	41	2	4	2	2	1	1	0	48	5
Plymouth Argyle	2021–22	League One	39	4	4	0	2	1	1	0	46	5
Plymouth Argyle	Total		80	6	8	2	4	2	2	0	94	10
Ipswich Town	2022–23	League One	1	0	1	1	0	0	2	0	4	1
Ipswich Town	2023–24	Championship	0	0	0	0	0	0	—		0	0
Ipswich Town	Total		1	0	1	0	0	0	2	0	4	1
Charlton Athletic (loan)	2023–24	League One	12	0	0	0	1	0	0	0	13	0
Crawley Town	2024–25	League One	42	4	1	0	2	0	2	0	47	4
Dundee United	2025–26	Scottish Premiership	29	0	3	1	1	0	4 (Note: Appearances in the UEFA Conference League)	0	37	1
Dundee United	2026–27	Scottish Premiership	10	0	0	0	5	0	0	0	15	0
Dundee United	Total		39	0	3	1	6	0	4	0	52	1
Career total			287	20	17	4	18	3	22	0	343	27

=== International ===
As of match played 12 October 2025

Appearances and goals by national team and year
National team	Year	Apps	Goals
Guinea-Bissau	2022	4	1
Guinea-Bissau	2023	0	0
Guinea-Bissau	2024	0	0
Guinea-Bissau	2025	4	0
Total		8	0

==== International goals ====
As of match played 23 March 2022. Guinea-Bissau score listed first, score column indicates score after each Camará goal.

International goals by date, venue, cap, opponent, score, result and competition
No.	Date	Venue	Opponent	Score	Result	Competition
1	23 March 2022	Estádio Municipal de Óbidos, Óbidos, Portugal	Equatorial Guinea	3–0	3–0	Friendly
