= Emmanuel Agyei =

Ghanaian footballer

- Agyei with Dundee United in 2026

Personal information
- Full name: Emmanuel Agyei
- Date of birth: 3 November 2004 (age 22)
- Place of birth: Ghana
- Height: 1.88 m (6 ft 2 in)
- Positions: Defensive midfielder; centre-back

Team information
- Current team: Dundee United
- Number: 12

Youth career
- 2016–2021: Shalom FC

Senior career*
Years	Team	Apps	(Gls)
2021–2024	Dreams FC	60	(0)
2024–	F.C. Ashdod	25	(0)
2025	→ Hapoel Ramat Gan (loan)	8	(0)
2026–	Dundee United	11	(1)

International career^{‡}
2022	Ghana U20	1	(0)
2026–	Ghana	1	(0)
- * Club domestic league appearances and goals as of 20 May 2026 ‡ National team caps and goals as of 22 May 2026

Emmanuel Agyei (born 3 November 2004) is a Ghanaian professional footballer who plays as a defensive midfielder or centre-back for Scottish Premiership club Dundee United and the Ghana national team.

== Club career ==
=== Shalom FC ===
In 2016, Agyei started his career with Shalom FC in the Eastern Region of the Division Two League, the Ghanaian second tier.

=== Dreams FC ===
In October 2021, Agyei signed for Ghana Premier League club Dreams FC on a four-year contract. He made his debut on 7 November 2021 in a 3–1 away win against Elmina Sharks FC, coming on in the 85th minute.

=== F.C. Ashdod ===
On 22 August 2024, Agyei signed for Israeli Premier League club F.C. Ashdod on a five-year contract.

=== Dundee United FC ===
On 2 February 2026, Agyei signed for Scottish Premiership club Dundee United until 30 June 2029. He made his Debut against Falkirk FC on the 6th of March 2026 in a 2–1 loss in the Scottish cup quarter final.He scored his first professional goal for United on 22 March 2026 in a 2–0 win against Celtic, in the 66th minute.
