= Amar Fatah =

Swedish footballer

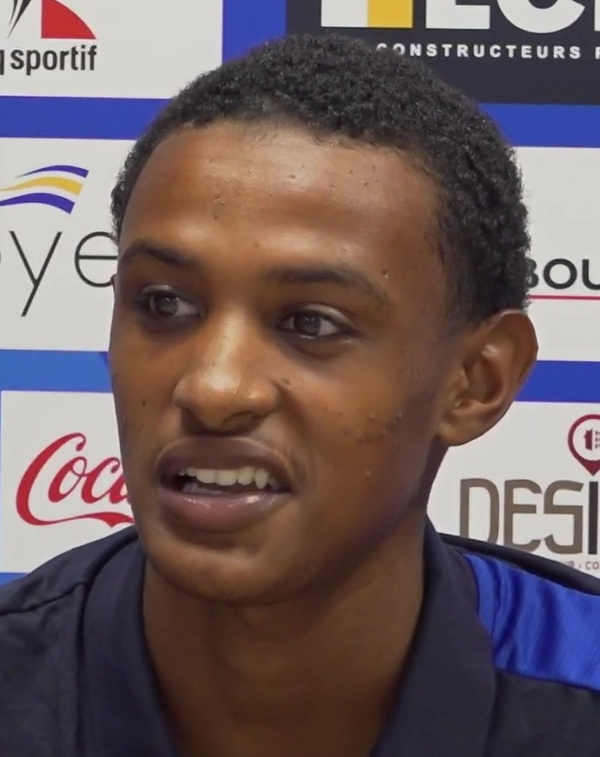
- Fatah in 2022.

Personal information
- Full name: Amar Abdirahman Ahmed Fatah
- Date of birth: 19 February 2004 (age 22)
- Place of birth: Spånga, Sweden
- Height: 1.80 m (5 ft 11 in)
- Position: Winger

Team information
- Current team: Lecce
- Number: 7

Youth career
- IF Brommapojkarna
- –2021: AIK

Senior career*
Years	Team	Apps	(Gls)
2021–2022	AIK	10	(1)
2022	Troyes II	3	(0)
2022–2026	Troyes	1	(0)
2022–2024	→ Lommel (loan)	24	(4)
2024–2025	→ Willem II (loan)	22	(1)
2025–2026	→ Dundee United (loan)	30	(8)
2026–	Lecce	5	(1)

International career^{‡}
2021–2023	Sweden U19	11	(4)
2024–2025	Sweden U21	7	(0)
- * Club domestic league appearances and goals as of 15:17, 12 October 2026 (UTC) ‡ National team caps and goals as of 21:49, 11 September 2025 (UTC)

Amar Abdirahman Ahmed Fatah (born 19 February 2004) is a Swedish professional footballer who plays as a winger for Serie A club Lecce.

== Club career ==
On 19 November 2021, Fatah signed his first professional contract with AIK, until the end of 2024.

On 30 August 2022, Fatah signed a five-year contract with Troyes in France for a sum of €5 million.

On 31 January 2023, Fatah joined Lommel in Belgium on loan for the rest of the 2022–23 season. The loan was extended for the 2023–24 season.

In July 2024, Fatah went on trial with Manchester City during their pre-season tour of the United States, during this spell he featured on the bench for each match, and played off the bench in the games against AC Milan and Barcelona, scoring City's only penalty in the shootout against the latter. Fatah rounded off his preseason tour with another cameo off the bench against Chelsea.

On 26 August 2024, Fatah joined Willem II in the Netherlands on a season-long loan.

On 14 July 2025, Fatah joined Scottish Premiership side Dundee United F.C. on loan for the 2025–26 Scottish Premiership season.

On 25 August 2026, Fatah moved to Lecce in Italy with a three-year contract.

== International career ==
Born in Sweden to Somali parents, Fatah is a youth international for Sweden.

== Career statistics ==
=== Club ===
As of match played 15 September 2024

Appearances and goals by club, season and competition
Club	Season	League			National cup (Note: Includes Svenska Cupen, Coupe de France, Belgian Cup, KNVB Cup)		Continental		Other		Total	
Club	Season	Division	Apps	Goals	Apps	Goals	Apps	Goals	Apps	Goals	Apps	Goals
AIK	2021	Allsvenskan	1	0	0	0	—		—		1	0
AIK	2022	Allsvenskan	9	1	4	0	6 (Note: Appearance(s) in UEFA Europa Conference League)	0	—		19	1
AIK	Total		10	1	4	0	6	0	—		20	1
Troyes II	2022-23	Championnat National 3	3	0	—		—		—		3	0
Troyes	2022-23	Ligue 1	1	0	1	0	—		—		2	0
Lommel (loan)	2022-23	Challenger Pro League	9	3	0	0	—		—		9	3
Lommel (loan)	2023-24	Challenger Pro League	15	1	1	0	—		2 (Note: Appearance(s) in Promotion/Relegation play-offs)	0	18	1
Lommel (loan)	Total		24	3	1	0	—		2	0	27	3
Willem II	2024-25	Eredivisie	3	0	0	0	—		—		3	0
Career total			41	5	6	0	6	0	2	0	55	5
