= Jordan Amissah =

German footballer (born 2001)

- Amissah with Dundee United in 2026

Personal information
- Full name: Jordan Yamoah Amissah
- Date of birth: 2 August 2001 (age 25)
- Place of birth: Herne, Germany
- Height: 1.98 m (6 ft 6 in)
- Position: Goalkeeper

Team information
- Current team: Dundee United
- Number: 30

Youth career
- 2005–2007: SV Holsterhausen Herne
- 2007–2009: VfL Bochum
- 2009–2015: Schalke 04
- 2015–2018: Borussia Dortmund
- 2018–2021: Sheffield United

Senior career*
Years	Team	Apps	(Gls)
2021–2024	Sheffield United	1	(0)
2021	→ Guiseley (loan)	6	(0)
2022	→ Spennymoor Town (loan)	18	(0)
2023	→ Burton Albion (loan)	2	(0)
2024–2025	Ross County	20	(0)
2025–2026	Burton Albion	5	(0)
2026–	Dundee United	0	(0)
- * Club domestic league appearances and goals as of 17:05, 3 August 2025 (UTC)

Jordan Yamoah Amissah (born 2 August 2001) is a German professional footballer who plays as a goalkeeper for Scottish Premiership club Dundee United.

== Early life ==
Of Ghanaian descent, Amissah was born on 2 August 2001 in Germany. Growing up, he supported German side FC Schalke 04.

== Club career ==
=== Sheffield United ===
Amissah is a youth product of the academies of the German clubs Holsterhausen Herne, VfL Bochum, Schalke 04 and Borussia Dortmund before moving to England with the youth sides of Sheffield United in 2018. On 21 May 2021, he signed his first professional contract with Sheffield United. He began his senior career on loan with Guiseley in the National League North for the first half of the 2021–22 season. In January 2022 he was loaned to Spennymoor Town for the second half of the National League North Season. He made his professional debut with Sheffield United in a 1–1 EFL Championship tie with Luton Town on 26 August 2022, coming on as a substitute in the 78th minute after the starting goalkeeper Wes Foderingham fell ill. In January 2023, Amissah joined League One club Burton Albion on loan until the end of the season. Amissah made his debut for Burton Albion in the FA Cup in a 1–0 defeat to Grimsby Town on 7 January. A week later, he made his League One debut in a 4–0 defeat to Shrewsbury Town. It wasn't until 3 May that he would make an appearance in goal, in a 1–0 victory over Cambridge United.

On 29 May 2024, Sheffield United announced he would be released in the summer when his contract expired. He spent time in July 2024 on trial with Scottish Championship club Partick Thistle, appearing on the bench in a friendly against Heart of Midlothian played at the University of Glasgow’s sports complex in Garscube on 3 July.

=== Ross County ===
On 6 December 2024, Amissah signed for Scottish club Ross County on a short-term deal. In January 2025, Amissah allegedly received a racially abusive social media message after a match against Aberdeen. On 7 January 2025, he extended his deal until the end of the season.

On 25 March 2025, Amissah signed a two-year deal to remain with the Staggies until June 2027. He suffered relegation from the top flight to the second tier while playing for the club.

=== Burton Albion ===
On 30 June 2025, Amissah returned to League One side Burton Albion on an initial two-year deal for an undisclosed fee.

== International career ==
Despite being born and raised in Germany, Amissah said in 2023 that playing for Ghana was "non-negotiable". He is a Ghana youth international.

== Career statistics ==
As of end of 2024–25 season

Appearances and goals by club, season and competition
Club	Season	League			National cup		League cup		Other		Total	
Club	Season	Division	Apps	Goals	Apps	Goals	Apps	Goals	Apps	Goals	Apps	Goals
Sheffield United	2022–23	Championship	1	0	0	0	0	0	—		1	0
Sheffield United	2023–24	Premier League	0	0	0	0	0	0	—		0	0
Sheffield United	Total		1	0	0	0	0	0	0	0	1	0
Guiseley (loan)	2022–23	National League	6	0	0	0	0	0	—		6	0
Spennymoor Town (loan)	2022–23	National League	18	0	0	0	0	0	2 (Note: Appearances in FA Trophy)	0	20	0
Burton Albion (loan)	2022–23	League One	2	0	1	0	0	0	—		3	0
Ross County	2024–25	Scottish Premiership	20	0	1	0	0	0	2 (Note: Appearance(s) in Scottish Premiership play-offs)	0	23	0
Career total			47	0	2	0	0	0	4	0	53	0
