= Zac Sapsford =

Australian footballer

- Sapsford with Dundee United in 2026

Personal information
- Full name: Zachary Albert Sapsford
- Date of birth: 16 August 2002 (age 24)
- Place of birth: Sydney, New South Wales, Australia
- Height: 1.85 m (6 ft 1 in)
- Position: Striker

Team information
- Current team: Dundee United
- Number: 9

Youth career
- 2009–2011: Hakoah Sydney City East
- 2012–2013: Redfern Raiders
- 2014: Fraser Park
- 2015–2019: Hakoah Sydney City East
- 2019: Chester

Senior career*
| Years | Team | Apps | (Gls) |
| 2021 | Hakoah Sydney City East | 15 | (7) |
| 2022 | Sydney FC NPL | 12 | (7) |
| 2022–2025 | Western Sydney Wanderers NPL | 28 | (16) |
| 2022–2025 | Western Sydney Wanderers | 48 | (12) |
| 2025– | Dundee United | 48 | (12) |

International career^{‡}
| 2019 | Australia U17 | 1 | (0) |
- * Club domestic league appearances and goals as of 18 December 2025 ‡ National team caps and goals as of 24 October 2022

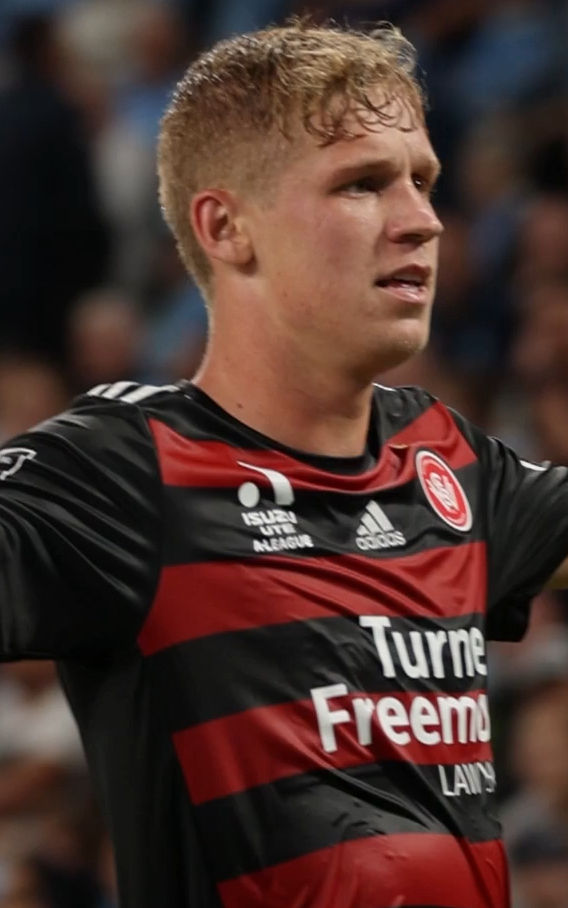
Sapsford playing for Western Sydney Wanderers in 2023

Zachary Albert Sapsford (born 16 August 2002) is an Australian professional soccer player who plays as a striker for Scottish Premiership club Dundee United.

== Early life ==
Sapsford was born on 16 August 2002 in Sydney, New South Wales, Australia, having grown up in the suburb of Bondi in the Eastern Suburbs. He is of Jewish descent, and was developed at Maccabi Hakoah, a Jewish soccer club.

== Club career ==
In 2022, Sapsford signed for Australian side Western Sydney Wanderers, where he played alongside former Spain international Juan Mata. Sapsford made his A-League Men debut against Brisbane Roar on 22 October 2022 coming off the bench in a 1–1 draw. He scored his first senior goal for the Wanderers in a 1–0 Sydney Derby win against Sydney FC on 25 November 2023. He was regarded to have established himself as a regular starter and scored nine goals during his final season while playing for the club.

=== Dundee United ===
On 10 June 2025, Sapsford signed for Scottish Premiership club Dundee United on a three-year deal for an undisclosed fee. Upon signing for the club, he played in the UEFA Conference League, where he formed an attacking partnership with English footballer Max Watters.

== Personal life ==
Following the 2025 Bondi Beach shooting, an antisemitic terrorist attack in his home suburb, Sapsford paid tribute to the victims of what became Australia's worst terrorist attack in history by wearing a black armband. His aunt and uncle were in attendance at the Hanukkah by the Sea event, which was the target of the shooting, surviving the attack without injury.
