= Yevhen Kucherenko =

Ukrainian footballer (born 1999)

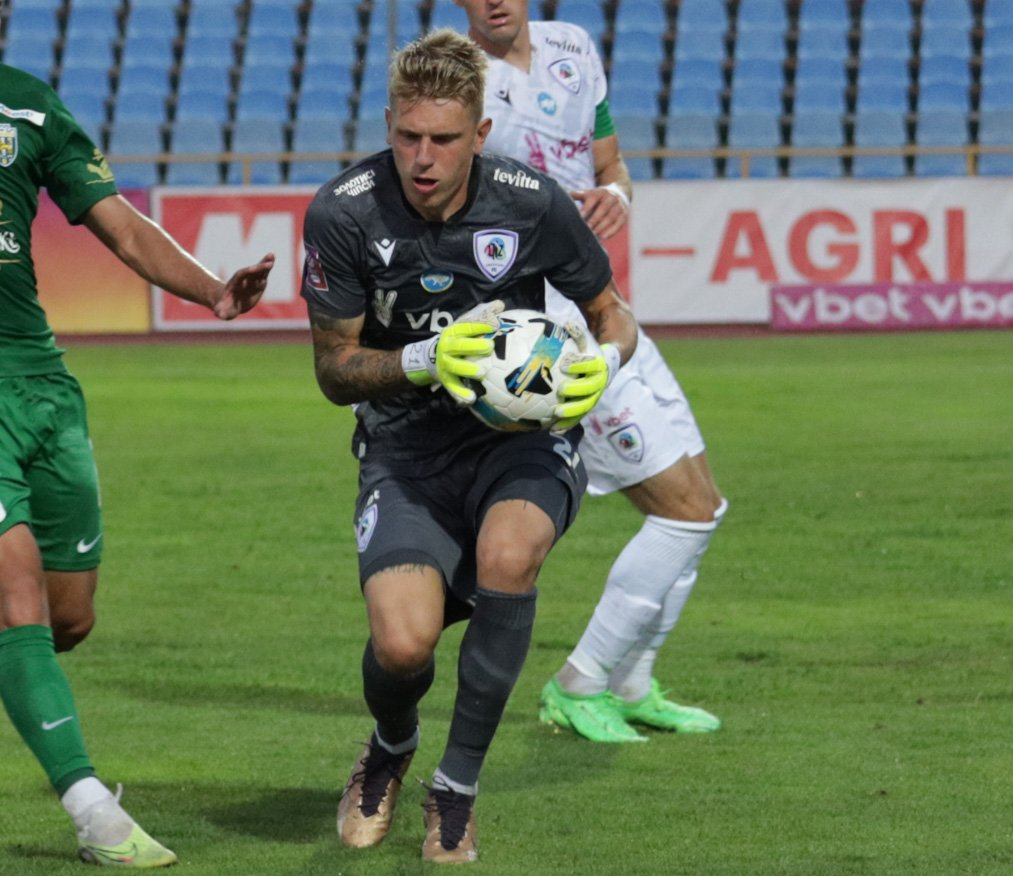
- Kucherenko with LNZ Cherkasy in 2024

Personal information
- Full name: Yevhen Ihorovych Kucherenko
- Date of birth: 27 August 1999 (age 27)
- Place of birth: Kyiv, Ukraine
- Height: 1.90 m (6 ft 3 in)
- Position: Goalkeeper

Team information
- Current team: Panetolikos
- Number: 99

Youth career
- 2005–2013: Voskhod Kyiv
- 2013–2016: Arsenal Kyiv
- 2016–2017: Shakhtar Donetsk

Senior career*
| Years | Team | Apps | (Gls) |
| 2017–2019 | Shakhtar Donetsk | 0 | (0) |
| 2019 | União Leiria | 1 | (0) |
| 2020–2022 | Kolos Kovalivka | 1 | (0) |
| 2021 | → Podillya Khmelnytskyi (loan) | 15 | (0) |
| 2022 | → Aksu (loan) | 19 | (0) |
| 2023–2024 | Dila Gori | 46 | (0) |
| 2024–2025 | LNZ Cherkasy | 35 | (0) |
| 2025–2026 | Dundee United | 17 | (0) |
| 2026– | Panetolikos | 25 | (0) |

International career^{‡}
| 2019 | Ukraine U21 | 1 | (0) |
- * Club domestic league appearances and goals as of 20 September 2026 ‡ National team caps and goals as of 24 May 2026

Yevhen Ihorovych Kucherenko (Ukrainian: Євген Ігорович Кучеренко; born 27 August 1999) is a Ukrainian professional footballer who plays as goalkeeper for Greek Super League club Panetolikos.

== Career ==
Kucherenko was born in Kyiv, Ukraine, and began his youth career at the Voshod and the FC Arsenal Kyiv academies.

In 2019 he was transferred to União Leiria in Portugal. In February 2020, however, he signed with FC Kolos Kovalivka in the Ukrainian Premier League.

Kucherenko signed a two-year contract with Scottish Premiership club Dundee United in June 2025. He played regularly for their first team until a poor performance in a 3–0 defeat against Falkirk, and was sold to Greek club Panetolikos in January 2026.
