= Iurie Iovu =

Moldovan footballer (born 2002)

- Iovu with Dundee United in 2026

Personal information
- Date of birth: 6 July 2002 (age 24)
- Place of birth: Chișinău, Moldova
- Height: 1.96 m (6 ft 5 in)
- Position: Defender

Team information
- Current team: Dundee United
- Number: 4

Youth career
- –2018: Zimbru Chișinău
- 2018–2022: Cagliari

Senior career*
Years	Team	Apps	(Gls)
2022	Cagliari	0	(0)
2022–2023	Venezia	0	(0)
2022–2023	→ Istra 1961 (loan)	0	(0)
2023–2025	Istra 1961	24	(0)
2025	→ Alavés B (loan)	12	(0)
2025–	Dundee United	27	(0)

International career^{‡}
2018	Moldova U17	3	(0)
2021–2024	Moldova U21	18	(1)
2021–	Moldova	9	(0)
- * Club domestic league appearances and goals as of 19:48, 23 February 2026 (UTC) ‡ National team caps and goals as of 14 November 2026

Iurie Iovu (born 6 July 2002) is a Moldovan professional footballer who plays as a defender for Scottish Premiership club Dundee United and the Moldova national team.

== Club career ==
He was raised in the system of Cagliari and began receiving call-ups to their senior squad in early 2022. He remained on the bench on all those occasions.

On 31 August 2022, Iovu signed a two-year contract with Serie B club Venezia and was immediately loaned out to Istra 1961 in Croatia, with an obligation to buy.

In 2025, he signed for Scottish side Dundee United, becoming the first Moldovan player to sign for the club.

== International career ==
He made his debut for Moldova national football team on 15 November 2021 in a World Cup qualifier against Austria.
