= Dario Naamo =

Iraqi footballer (born 2005)

- Naamo with Dundee United in 2026

Personal information
- Full name: Dario Felix Naamo
- Date of birth: 14 May 2005 (age 21)
- Place of birth: Finland
- Height: 1.74 m (5 ft 9 in)
- Position: Right-back

Team information
- Current team: Dundee United
- Number: 22

Youth career
- TiPS
- –2018: KäPa
- 2018–2022: Honka

Senior career*
Years	Team	Apps	(Gls)
2022–2023	Honka II	16	(1)
2022–2023	Honka	24	(1)
2024	SJK	21	(0)
2024–2025	St. Pölten	18	(1)
2025–	Dundee United	20	(0)

International career^{‡}
2019	Finland U15	3	(0)
2021–2022	Finland U17	8	(0)
2022–2023	Finland U18	7	(0)
2023–2024	Finland U19	4	(0)
2023–2026	Finland U21	14	(0)
2026–	Iraq	1	(0)
Medal record
Men's football
Representing Finland
Under-19 Baltic Cup
Winner	2023 Finland
- * Club domestic league appearances and goals as of 16 September 2026 ‡ National team caps and goals as of 30 May 2026

Dario Felix Naamo (Arabic: داريو فيليكس نعمو; born 14 May 2005) is a professional footballer who plays as a right-back for Scottish Premiership club Dundee United. Born in Finland, he plays for the Iraq national team.

== Early career ==
Naamo started playing football for Tikkurilan Palloseura (TiPS) in Vantaa, before he moved to the renowned Käpylän Pallo (KäPa) youth academy in Helsinki. In 2018, he joined the youth sector of Honka in Espoo.

== Club career ==
=== Honka ===
Naamo made his debut with Honka first team in Veikkausliiga on 2 July 2022 at the age of 17, in a 1–1 home draw against IFK Mariehamn. On 5 September 2023, he extended his contract with Honka, signing "a new long-term deal", according to the club. He scored his first goal in the league on 28 October 2023, the opening goal on the 3rd minute in a 5–0 home win against AC Oulu.

=== SJK ===
After Honka was declared bankruptcy after the 2023 season, it was announced that Naamo had signed a two-year deal with fellow Veikkausliiga club SJK on 27 November 2023.

=== St. Pölten ===
On 9 September 2024, Naamo was loaned out to Austrian club SKN St. Pölten, with an obligation to buy.

On 5 November, his move to St. Pölten was made permanent for a €200,000 fee. SJK also secured a sell-on clause. Naamo scored his first goal in 2. Liga on 7 March 2025, in a 3–1 away win over Kapfenberger SV.

=== Dundee United ===
On 4 July 2025, he joined Scottish Premiership club Dundee United on a season-long loan deal with an option to buy. However, on 14 August, Dundee United announced that they had signed with Naamo on a permanent basis on a three-year deal.

== International career ==
A regular Finnish youth international, Naamo has represented Finland at various youth national team levels.

He was named in the Finland U17 squad for the 2022 UEFA European Under-17 Championship qualification tournament in October 2021, against Bosnia-Herzegovina, Switzerland and Gibraltar. Finland finished 2nd in the group and advanced to the Elite round. In March 2022, Naamo was part of the Finland U17 squad in the Elite round matches against Portugal, Bulgaria and Ireland.

Naamo was part of the Finland U18 squad winning the friendly tournament Baltic Cup in June 2023.

In October 2023, Naamo was named in the Finland U19 squad in the 2024 UEFA European Under-19 Championship qualification tournament, in three games against Romania, Czech Republic and San Marino.

On 7 November 2023, Naamo got his first call-up to the Finland under-21 national team, for a friendly match against Sweden, and for a UEFA Under-21 Euro Championship qualifying match against Armenia. He made his U21 debut in a 3–0 friendly loss to Sweden on 16 November 2023. Naamo was named in the Finland U21 squad for the 2025 UEFA U21 Euro final tournament.

On 11 May 2026, Naamo's request to switch allegiance to Iraq was approved by FIFA. On 19 May, Naamo was called up to the Iraq national team preliminary training camp squad before the 2026 FIFA World Cup.

== Personal life ==
Born in Finland to a Finnish mother and an Iraqi Kurdish father, Naamo is also eligible to represent Iraq. He holds a dual Finnish-Iraqi citizenship. After Naamo was allegedly contacted by the Iraq Football Association, he confirmed this in an interview in April 2024, and stated that his main goal was to represent Finland.

== Career statistics ==
As of 25 October 2026

Appearances and goals by club, season and competition
Club	Season	League			National cup (Note: Includes Finnish Cup and Scottish Cup)		League cup (Note: Includes Finnish League Cup and Scottish League Cup)		Europe		Total	
Club	Season	Division	Apps	Goals	Apps	Goals	Apps	Goals	Apps	Goals	Apps	Goals
Honka Akatemia	2022	Kakkonen	14	1	0	0	—		—		14	1
Honka Akatemia	2023	Kakkonen	2	0	0	0	—		—		2	0
Honka Akatemia	Total		16	1	0	0	0	0	0	0	16	1
Honka	2022	Veikkausliiga	1	0	0	0	0	0	—		1	0
Honka	2023	Veikkausliiga	23	1	5	1	2	0	0	0	30	2
Honka	Total		24	1	5	1	2	0	0	0	31	2
SJK Seinäjoki	2024	Veikkausliiga	21	0	6	0	3	0	—		30	0
St. Pölten	2024–25	Austrian 2. Liga	18	1	0	0	—		—		18	1
St. Pölten	Total		39	1	6	0	3	0	—		48	1
Dundee United	2025–26	Scottish Premiership	16	0	1	0	1	0	0	0	18	0
Dundee United	2026–27	Scottish Premiership	2	0	0	0	0	0	—		0	0
Career total			97	3	12	1	6	0	0	0	113	4

== Honours ==
Honka

- Finnish Cup runner-up: 2023

Finland U18

- Baltic Cup: 2023
