= Bert Esselink =

Dutch footballer (born 1999)

- Esselink in 2026

Personal information
- Full name: Bert Johan Esselink
- Date of birth: 16 August 1999 (age 27)
- Place of birth: 's-Heerenberg, Netherlands
- Height: 1.91 m (6 ft 3 in)
- Position: Centre-back

Team information
- Current team: Dundee United
- Number: 3

Youth career
- FC Bergh
- MvR
- –2020: De Graafschap

Senior career*
Years	Team	Apps	(Gls)
2020–2022	PAEEK	46	(5)
2022–2023	APOEL	11	(0)
2022–2023	→ Olympiakos Nicosia (loan)	29	(4)
2023–2025	Stal Mielec	54	(2)
2025–	Dundee United	21	(1)
- * Club domestic league appearances and goals as of 20 May 2026

Bert Johan Esselink (born 16 August 1999) is a Dutch professional footballer who plays as a centre-back for Scottish Premiership club Dundee United.

== Club career ==
=== Early career ===
Born in 's-Heerenberg, Esselink started his career in the youth academy of Dutch club De Graafschap, before joining his first senior club PAEEK in 2020.

=== PAEEK ===
On 15 July 2020, it was officially announced that Esselink signed for PAEEK until June 2021.

He made his professional debut on 12 September 2020 in a Cypriot Second Division game against Achyronas Liopetriou.

On 27 June 2021, PAEEK announced the renewal of Esselink's contract until 31 May 2022.

=== APOEL ===
On 9 January 2022, it was officially announced that Esselink signed for APOEL until 2024 after his release clause was exercised.

==== Loan to Olympiakos Nicosia ====
On 26 August 2022, he was loaned for a year to Olympiakos Nicosia.

=== Stal Mielec ===
On 3 July 2023, Esselink signed a one-year contract with Polish Ekstraklasa side Stal Mielec. On 9 April 2024, his deal was extended for another season after meeting the requirements listed in his contract.

=== Dundee United ===
In June 2025, Esselink signed a two-year contract with Scottish Premiership club Dundee United.

== Career statistics ==
As of match played 24 May 2025

Appearances and goals by club, season and competition
Club	Season	League			National cup (Note: Includes Cypriot Cup, Polish Cup)		Continental		Other		Total	
Club	Season	Division	Apps	Goals	Apps	Goals	Apps	Goals	Apps	Goals	Apps	Goals
PAEEK	2020–21	Cypriot Second Division	32	3	1	0	—		—		33	3
PAEEK	2021–22	Cypriot First Division	14	2	0	0	—		—		14	2
PAEEK	Total		46	5	1	0	—		—		47	5
APOEL	2021–22	Cypriot First Division	11	0	3	1	—		—		14	1
Olympiakos Nicosia (loan)	2022–23	Cypriot First Division	29	4	4	0	—		—		33	4
Stal Mielec	2023–24	Ekstraklasa	26	2	2	0	—		—		28	2
Stal Mielec	2024–25	Ekstraklasa	28	0	0	0	—		—		28	0
Stal Mielec	Total		54	2	2	0	—		—		56	2
Career total			140	11	10	1	0	0	0	0	150	12

== Honours ==
PAEEK

- Cypriot Second Division: 2020–21
