= 2011–12 East of Scotland Football League =

The 2011–12 East of Scotland Football League was the 83rd season of the East of Scotland Football League. The Spartans were the defending champions.

The league was split into two separate divisions, the Premier Division and the First Division, with 25 teams competing across the two divisions.

== Premier Division ==
East of Scotland Football League Premier Division
- Season: 2011–12
- Champions: Stirling University
- Relegated: Leith Athletic; Selkirk
- Matches played: 132
- Goals scored: 516 (3.91 per match)

Stirling University claimed their first league title thanks to a superior goal difference after finishing level on points with defending champions Spartans. As champions they entered the second round of the 2012–13 Scottish Cup.

=== Teams ===
Location of teams in 2011–12 East of Scotland Football League Premier Division
Location of teams in 2011–12 East of Scotland Football League Premier Division within Edinburgh

The following teams changed division prior to the 2011–12 season.

==== To Premier Division ====
Promoted from First Division

- Gretna 2008
- Leith Athletic

==== From Premier Division ====
Relegated to First Division

- Preston Athletic
- Heriot-Watt University

=== Stadia and locations ===
Team	Location	Home ground	Capacity
Civil Service Strollers	Edinburgh	Telford College Sports Ground	1,000
Edinburgh City	Edinburgh	Meadowbank Stadium	16,500
Edinburgh University	Edinburgh	Peffermill Playing Fields	1,000
Gretna 2008	Gretna	Raydale Park	2,200
Leith Athletic	Edinburgh	Meadowbank 3G	500
Lothian Thistle Hutchison Vale	Edinburgh	Saughton Sports Complex	1,000
Selkirk	Selkirk	Yarrow Park	1,000
The Spartans	Edinburgh	Ainslie Park	3,000
Stirling University	Stirling	Gannochy Sports Centre	1,000
Tynecastle	Edinburgh	Fernieside Recreation Ground	1,500
Vale of Leithen	Innerleithen	Victoria Park	1,500
Whitehill Welfare	Rosewell	Ferguson Park	2,614

=== League table ===
Pos	Team	Pld	W	D	L	GF	GA	GD	Pts	Qualification or relegation
1	Stirling University (C)	22	16	3	3	74	32	+42	51	Qualification for the Scottish Cup second round
2	The Spartans	22	16	3	3	66	28	+38	51	
3	Whitehill Welfare	22	12	3	7	45	34	+11	39	
4	Edinburgh University	22	10	3	9	38	26	+12	33	
5	Edinburgh City	22	10	3	9	41	39	+2	33	
6	Gretna 2008	22	9	6	7	40	46	−6	33	
7	Civil Service Strollers	22	10	1	11	38	46	−8	31	
8	Vale of Leithen	22	9	1	12	49	47	+2	28	
9	Tynecastle	22	8	3	11	33	52	−19	27	
10	Lothian Thistle Hutchison Vale	22	6	3	13	36	50	−14	21	
11	Leith Athletic (R)	22	5	4	13	32	59	−27	19	Relegation to the First Division
12	Selkirk (R)	22	3	3	16	24	57	−33	12	Relegation to the First Division

Source: Scottish Football Historical Archive
Rules for classification: 1) Points; 2) Goal difference; 3) Number of goals scored
(C) Champions; (R) Relegated

== First Division ==
East of Scotland Football League First Division
- Season: 2011–12
- Champions: Heriot-Watt University
- Promoted: Heriot-Watt University; Preston Athletic
- Matches played: 156
- Goals scored: 600 (3.85 per match)

The First Division saw an increase in the number of clubs to thirteen with the addition of Duns to the league. Heriot-Watt University claimed their second First Division title to gain immediate promotion back to the Premier Division.

=== Teams ===
The following teams have changed division since the 2011–12 season.

==== To First Division ====
Relegated from Premier Division

- Preston Athletic
- Heriot-Watt University

Transferred from Border Amateur League

- Duns

==== From First Division ====
Promoted to Premier Division

- Gretna 2008
- Leith Athletic
Location of teams in 2012–13 East of Scotland Football League First Division
Location of teams in 2012–13 East of Scotland Football League First Division within the Borders and Midlothian

=== Stadia and locations ===
Team	Location	Home ground	Capacity
Berwick Rangers Reserves	Berwick-upon-Tweed	Shielfield Park	4,500
Coldstream	Coldstream	Home Park	1,000
Craigroyston	Edinburgh	St Mark's Park	2,000
Duns	Duns	New Hawthorn Park	1,000
Easthouses Lily MW	Dalkeith	Newbattle Complex	1,500
Eyemouth United	Eyemouth	Warner Park	2,000
Gala Fairydean	Galashiels	3G Arena, Netherdale	5,500
Hawick Royal Albert	Hawick	Albert Park	1,000
Heriot-Watt University	Edinburgh	Riccarton Campus	1,800
Kelso United	Kelso	Woodside Park	1,200
Ormiston	Ormiston	Recreation Park	2,000
Peebles Rovers	Peebles	Whitestone Park	2,250
Preston Athletic	Prestonpans	Pennypit Park	4,000

=== League table ===
Pos	Team	Pld	W	D	L	GF	GA	GD	Pts	Promotion
1	Heriot-Watt University (C, P)	24	17	4	3	61	25	+36	55	Promotion to the Premier Division
2	Preston Athletic (P)	24	14	6	4	73	35	+38	48	Promotion to the Premier Division
3	Gala Fairydean	24	15	3	6	55	31	+24	48	
4	Eyemouth United	24	14	5	5	63	42	+21	47	
5	Craigroyston	24	10	8	6	37	33	+4	38	
6	Duns	24	10	6	8	48	39	+9	36	
7	Coldstream	24	11	3	10	51	53	−2	36	
8	Kelso United	24	8	4	12	43	54	−11	28	
9	Ormiston	24	8	2	14	27	56	−29	26	
10	Berwick Rangers Reserves	24	5	8	11	53	64	−11	23	
11	Peebles Rovers	24	3	9	12	28	48	−20	18	
12	Easthouses Lily	24	3	8	13	37	59	−22	17	
13	Hawick Royal Albert	24	3	4	17	24	61	−37	13	

Source: Scottish Football Historical Archive
Rules for classification: 1) Points; 2) Goal difference; 3) Number of goals scored
(C) Champions; (P) Promoted
