= 2008–09 East of Scotland Football League =

The 2008–09 East of Scotland Football League was the 80th season of the East of Scotland Football League. Whitehill Welfare were the defending champions. The league was split into two separate divisions, the Premier Division and the First Division, each featuring twelve teams.

This season saw Edinburgh Athletic amalgamate with Leith Athletic who took the former's place in the league, and the departure of Annan Athletic who left to join the Scottish Football League. Gretna 2008 was elected in their place.

== Premier Division ==
East of Scotland Football League Premier Division
- Season: 2008–09
- Champions: Spartans
- Relegated: Easthouses Lily, Peebles
- Matches played: 132
- Goals scored: 470 (3.56 per match)

=== League table ===
Pos	Team	Pld	W	D	L	GF	GA	GD	Pts	Promotion, qualification or relegation
1	Spartans (C)	22	16	4	2	73	26	+47	52	Qualification for 2009–10 Scottish Cup Second round
2	Dalbeattie Star	22	14	4	4	61	26	+35	46	Resigned from the league
3	Lothian Thistle	22	11	3	8	46	26	+20	36	
4	Edinburgh University	22	8	8	6	37	19	+18	32	
5	Whitehill Welfare	22	8	8	6	38	28	+10	32	
6	Preston Athletic	22	9	5	8	36	31	+5	32	
7	Heriot-Watt University	22	9	3	10	33	31	+2	30	
8	Edinburgh City	22	8	5	9	45	34	+11	29	
9	Coldstream	22	8	5	9	30	30	0	29	
10	Selkirk	22	8	3	11	19	55	−36	27	
11	Easthouses Lily (R)	22	7	2	13	40	40	0	23	Relegation to the First Division
12	Peebles (R)	22	1	0	21	12	124	−112	3	Relegation to the First Division

Source: Scottish Football Historical Archive - East of Scotland Football League Final Table
Rules for classification: 1) Points; 2) Goal difference; 3) Number of goals scored
(C) Champions; (R) Relegated

== First Division ==
East of Scotland Football League First Division
- Season: 2008–09
- Champions: Tynecastle
- Promoted: Tynecastle, Civil Service Strollers
- Matches played: 132
- Goals scored: 489 (3.7 per match)

=== League table ===
Pos	Team	Pld	W	D	L	GF	GA	GD	Pts	Promotion, qualification or relegation
1	Tynecastle (C, P)	22	17	3	2	58	22	+36	54	Promotion to the Premier Division
2	Civil Service Strollers (P)	22	15	1	6	48	29	+19	46	Promotion to the Premier Division
3	Stirling University	22	13	5	4	50	21	+29	44	
4	Gretna 2008	22	13	5	4	50	22	+28	44	
5	Craigroyston	22	12	3	7	47	34	+13	39	
6	Gala Fairydean	22	10	4	8	45	37	+8	34	
7	Vale of Leithen	22	9	4	9	41	37	+4	31	
8	Leith Athletic	22	8	4	10	44	34	+10	28	
9	Ormiston	22	6	2	14	30	61	−31	20	
10	Eyemouth United	22	5	2	15	33	47	−14	17	
11	Kelso United	22	4	5	13	28	48	−20	17	
12	Hawick Royal Albert	22	0	2	20	15	97	−82	2	

Source: Scottish Football Historical Archive - East of Scotland Football League Final Table
Rules for classification: 1) Points; 2) Goal difference; 3) Number of goals scored
(C) Champions; (P) Promoted
