= 2013–14 East of Scotland Football League =

The 2013–14 East of Scotland Football League was the 85th season of the East of Scotland Football League. Whitehill Welfare were the reigning champions, but not defend their title after moving to the Lowland League.

The league was split into two separate divisions, the Premier Division and the First Division. This season saw a reduction in the number of clubs from 26 to 20, due to the departure of nine clubs who left to join the inaugural Lowland Football League, although additional reserve teams joined the league to boost numbers.

== Premier Division ==
East of Scotland Football League Premier Division
- Season: 2013–14
- Champions: Lothian Thistle Hutchison Vale
- Relegated: Heriot-Watt University
- Matches: 90
- Goals: 324 (3.6 per match)

The 2013–14 Premier Division saw a reduction in the number of clubs from twelve to ten, due to the departure of seven clubs to the newly-formed Lowland Football League. As a result, Edinburgh University and Tynecastle retained their place in the division despite finishing in the previous season's relegation places. Three clubs were promoted from the First Division and two reserve teams also entered the division.

=== Teams ===
Location of teams in 2013–14 East of Scotland Football League Premier Division
Location of teams in 2013–14 East of Scotland Football League Premier Division within Edinburgh

The following teams changed division after the 2012–13 season.

==== To Premier Division ====
Promoted from First Division

- Coldstream
- Craigroyston
- Leith Athletic

Spartans and Stirling University entered reserve teams after their move to the Lowland Football League.

==== From Premier Division ====
Transferred to Lowland Football League

- Edinburgh City
- Gretna 2008
- Preston Athletic
- Spartans
- Stirling University
- Vale of Leithen
- Whitehill Welfare

=== Stadia and locations ===
Team	Location	Home ground	Capacity
Civil Service Strollers	Edinburgh	Telford College Sports Ground	1,000
Coldstream	Coldstream	Home Park	1,000
Craigroyston	Edinburgh	St Mark’s Park	2,000
Edinburgh University	Edinburgh	New Peffermill Stadium	1,100
Heriot-Watt University	Edinburgh	Riccarton Campus	1,800
Leith Athletic	Edinburgh	Meadowbank 3G	500
Lothian Thistle Hutchison Vale	Edinburgh	Saughton Sports Complex	1,000
The Spartans reserves	Edinburgh	Ainslie Park	3,000
Stirling University reserves	Stirling	Gannochy Sports Centre	1,000
Tynecastle	Edinburgh	Fernieside Recreation Ground	1,500

=== League table ===
Pos	Team	Pld	W	D	L	GF	GA	GD	Pts	Qualification or relegation
1	Lothian Thistle Hutchison Vale (C)	18	15	1	2	46	16	+30	46	
2	Stirling University reserves	18	10	2	6	35	34	+1	32	
3	Craigroyston	18	9	4	5	36	22	+14	31	
4	Tynecastle	18	9	1	8	45	40	+5	28	
5	Edinburgh University	18	5	8	5	30	25	+5	23	Transferred to Lowland League
6	The Spartans reserves	18	6	5	7	30	28	+2	23	
7	Leith Athletic	18	6	5	7	35	36	−1	23	
8	Coldstream	18	6	2	10	23	35	−12	20	
9	Civil Service Strollers	18	5	1	12	25	51	−26	16	
10	Heriot-Watt University (R)	18	3	3	12	19	37	−18	12	Relegation to the First Division

Source: Scottish Football Historical Archive
Rules for classification: 1) Points; 2) Goal difference; 3) Number of goals scored
(C) Champions; (R) Relegated

== First Division ==
East of Scotland Football League First Division
- Season: 2013–14
- Champions: Hibernian Colts
- Promoted: Easthouses Lily
- Matches: 90
- Goals: 371 (4.12 per match)

The First Division also saw a reduction in the number of clubs, from fourteen to ten. This was due to the departure of two clubs to the newly-formed Lowland Football League and promotion of additional clubs to rebalance the number of clubs with the Premier Division.

=== Teams ===
The following teams changed division after the 2012–13 season.

==== To First Division ====
- Hibernian Colts

==== From First Division ====
Promoted to Premier Division

- Coldstream
- Craigroyston
- Leith Athletic

Transferred to Lowland Football League

- Gala Fairydean Rovers
- Selkirk
Location of teams in 2013–14 East of Scotland Football League Premier Division

=== Stadia and locations ===
Team	Location	Home ground	Capacity
Berwick Rangers reserves	Berwick-upon-Tweed	Shielfield Park	4,500
Burntisland Shipyard	Burntisland	Recreation Park	1,000
Duns	Duns	New Hawthorn Park	1,000
Easthouses Lily	Dalkeith	Newbattle Complex	1,500
Eyemouth United	Eyemouth	Warner Park	2,000
Hawick Royal Albert	Hawick	Albert Park	1,000
Hibernian Colts	Ormiston	Hibernian Training Centre	
Kelso	Kelso	Woodside Park	1,200
Ormiston	Ormiston	Recreation Park	2,000
Peebles Rovers	Peebles	Whitestone Park	2,250

=== League table ===
Pos	Team	Pld	W	D	L	GF	GA	GD	Pts	Promotion
1	Hibernian Colts (C)	18	15	1	2	72	16	+56	46	Resigned from the league
2	Easthouses Lily (P)	18	13	3	2	54	19	+35	42	Promotion to the Premier Division
3	Berwick Rangers reserves	18	11	0	7	42	27	+15	33	Resigned from the league
4	Peebles Rovers	18	7	4	7	35	37	−2	25	
5	Kelso United	18	6	4	8	28	38	−10	22	
6	Burntisland Shipyard	18	6	3	9	24	43	−19	21	
7	Hawick Royal Albert	18	6	1	11	29	44	−15	19	
8	Duns	18	5	3	10	29	46	−17	18	
9	Ormiston	18	6	0	12	27	48	−21	18	
10	Eyemouth United	18	4	3	11	31	53	−22	15	

Source: Scottish Football Historical Archive
Rules for classification: 1) Points; 2) Goal difference; 3) Number of goals scored
(C) Champions; (P) Promoted
