= 2012–13 East of Scotland Football League =

The 2012–13 East of Scotland Football League was the 84th season of the East of Scotland Football League. Stirling University were the defending champions.

The league was split into two separate divisions, the Premier Division and the First Division. This season saw 26 teams competing across the two divisions, which was the largest number in the league's history prior to the influx of Junior clubs in 2018–19.

== Premier Division ==
East of Scotland Football League Premier Division
- Season: 2012–13
- Champions: Whitehill Welfare
- Relegated: none
- Matches played: 110
- Goals scored: 451 (4.1 per match)

Whitehill Welfare claimed their 16th league title. Post-season league reconstruction after the departure of nine clubs to the newly formed Lowland Football League meant there was no relegation from the Premier Division.

=== Teams ===
Location of teams in 2012–13 East of Scotland Football League Premier Division
Location of teams in 2012–13 East of Scotland Football League Premier Division within Edinburgh

The following teams have changed division since the 2011–12 season.

==== To Premier Division ====
Promoted from First Division

- Heriot-Watt University
- Preston Athletic

==== From Premier Division ====
Relegated to First Division

- Leith Athletic
- Selkirk

=== Stadia and locations ===
Team	Location	Home ground	Capacity
Civil Service Strollers	Edinburgh	Telford College Sports Ground	1,000
Edinburgh City	Edinburgh	Meadowbank Stadium	16,500
Edinburgh University	Edinburgh	Peffermill Playing Fields	1,100
Gretna 2008	Gretna	Raydale Park	2,200
Heriot-Watt University	Edinburgh	Riccarton Campus	1,800
Lothian Thistle Hutchison Vale	Edinburgh	Saughton Sports Complex	1,000
Preston Athletic	Prestonpans	Pennypit Park	4,000
Spartans	Edinburgh	Ainslie Park	3,000
Stirling University	Stirling	Gannochy Sports Centre	1,000
Tynecastle	Edinburgh	Fernieside Recreation Ground	1,500
Vale of Leithen	Innerleithen	Victoria Park	1,500
Whitehill Welfare	Rosewell	Ferguson Park	2,614

=== League table ===
Pos	Team	Pld	W	D	L	GF	GA	GD	Pts	Promotion, qualification or relegation
1	Whitehill Welfare (C)	22	18	1	3	53	21	+32	55	Founder member of Lowland League and qualification for 2013–14 Scottish Cup Second round
2	Stirling University	22	15	2	5	54	22	+32	47	Founder member of Lowland League
3	Spartans	22	14	4	4	44	23	+21	46	Founder member of Lowland League
4	Gretna 2008	22	9	7	6	34	25	+9	34	Founder member of Lowland League
5	Edinburgh City	22	9	3	10	31	32	−1	30	Founder member of Lowland League
6	Lothian Thistle Hutchison Vale	22	8	3	11	35	38	−3	27	
7	Preston Athletic	22	7	3	12	41	55	−14	24	Founder member of Lowland League
8	Civil Service Strollers	22	7	3	12	30	56	−26	24	
9	Vale of Leithen	22	5	8	9	41	49	−8	23	Founder member of Lowland League
10	Heriot-Watt University	22	6	5	11	21	37	−16	23	
11	Edinburgh University	22	4	8	10	26	40	−14	20	
12	Tynecastle	22	5	3	14	41	53	−12	18	

Source: Scottish Football Historical Archive
Rules for classification: 1) Points; 2) Goal difference; 3) Number of goals scored
(C) Champions

== First Division ==
East of Scotland Football League First Division
- Season: 2012–13
- Champions: Craigroyston
- Promoted: Craigroyston, Coldstream, Leith Athletic
- Matches played: 182
- Goals scored: 798 (4.38 per match)

The First Division saw an increase in the number of clubs to fourteen with the addition of Burntisland Shipyard to the league. Craigroyston claimed the First Division title for the second time. Post-season league construction meant a third club gained promotion to the Premier Division.

=== Teams ===
The following teams have changed division since the 2011–12 season.

==== To First Division ====
Relegated from Premier Division

- Selkirk
- Leith Athletic

Transferred from Kingdom Caledonian AFA

- Burntisland Shipyard

==== From First Division ====
Promoted to Premier Division

- Heriot-Watt University
- Preston Athletic
Location of teams in 2012–13 East of Scotland Football League First Division

=== Stadia and locations ===
Team	Location	Home ground	Capacity
Berwick Rangers reserves	Berwick-upon-Tweed	Shielfield Park	4,500
Burntisland Shipyard	Burntisland	Recreation Park	1,000
Coldstream	Coldstream	Home Park	1,000
Craigroyston	Edinburgh	St Mark's Park	2,000
Duns	Duns	New Hawthorn Park	1,000
Easthouses Lily MW	Dalkeith	Newbattle Complex	1,500
Eyemouth United	Eyemouth	Warner Park	2,000
Gala Fairydean	Galashiels	3G Arena, Netherdale	5,500
Hawick Royal Albert	Hawick	Albert Park	1,000
Kelso United	Kelso	Woodside Park	1,200
Leith Athletic	Edinburgh	Meadowbank 3G	500
Ormiston	Ormiston	Recreation Park	2,000
Peebles Rovers	Peebles	Whitestone Park	2,250
Selkirk	Selkirk	Yarrow Park	1,000

=== League table ===
Pos	Team	Pld	W	D	L	GF	GA	GD	Pts	Promotion
1	Craigroyston (C, P)	26	21	2	3	77	29	+48	65	Promotion to the Premier Division
2	Coldstream (P)	26	18	5	3	80	25	+55	59	Promotion to the Premier Division
3	Leith Athletic (P)	26	18	3	5	88	38	+50	57	Promotion to the Premier Division
4	Berwick Rangers reserves	26	15	4	7	74	46	+28	49	
5	Eyemouth United	26	15	3	8	70	59	+11	48	
6	Easthouses Lily	26	14	3	9	69	63	+6	45	
7	Gala Fairydean	26	12	3	11	56	69	−13	39	Founder member of Lowland League
8	Kelso United	26	9	6	11	59	62	−3	33	
9	Selkirk	26	8	4	14	34	49	−15	28	Founder member of Lowland League
10	Duns	26	6	6	14	43	56	−13	24	
11	Ormiston	26	6	5	15	46	53	−7	23	
12	Peebles Rovers	26	6	5	15	36	76	−40	23	
13	Burntisland Shipyard	26	3	5	18	34	84	−50	14	
14	Hawick Royal Albert	26	2	4	20	32	89	−57	10	

Source: Scottish Football Historical Archive
Rules for classification: 1) Points; 2) Goal difference; 3) Number of goals scored
(C) Champions; (P) Promoted
