= 2015–16 East of Scotland Football League =

East of Scotland Football League
- Season: 2015–16
- Dates: 22 August 2015 – 28 May 2016
- Champions: Leith Athletic
- Matches: 210
- Goals: 977 (4.65 per match)

The 2015–16 East of Scotland Football League (known for sponsorship reasons as the Central Taxis East of Scotland League) was the 87th season of the East of Scotland Football League, and the 2nd season as the sixth tier of the Scottish football pyramid system. The season began on 22 August 2015 and finished on 28 May 2016. Lothian Thistle Hutchison Vale were the defending champions.

The league was merged into a single division of 16 teams, for the first time since 1986–87. Following the resignation of Easthouses Lily the membership had tied 8/8 on a vote between two divisions of eight or a single division of 16, and the League Board selected the latter. As a result, Coldstream and Craigroyston effectively avoided relegation despite finishing in the bottom two places of the previous season's Premier Division.

This season saw the departure of Easthouses Lily who left to join the Scottish Junior Football Association.

Kelso United resigned at the start of September after fulfilling their opening East of Scotland Qualifying League and Qualifying Cup matches and three league games. This reduced the number of clubs to 15. Their league defeats to Coldstream (0–7), Leith Athletic (5–0) and Burntisland Shipyard (5–0) were expunged.

== Teams ==
Location of teams in 2015–16 East of Scotland Football League

The following teams have changed division since the 2014–15 season.

=== From East of Scotland Football League ===
Transferred to East South Division

- Easthouses Lily

Team	Location	Home ground	Capacity	Ref.
Burntisland Shipyard	Burntisland	Recreation Park	1,000	
Civil Service Strollers	Edinburgh	Telford College Sports Ground	1,000	
Coldstream	Coldstream	Home Park	1,000	
Craigroyston	Edinburgh	St Mark’s Park	2,000	
Duns	Duns	New Hawthorn Park	1,000	
Eyemouth United	Eyemouth	Warner Park	2,000	
Hawick Royal Albert	Hawick	Albert Park	1,000	
Heriot-Watt University	Edinburgh	Riccarton Campus	1,800	
Leith Athletic	Edinburgh	Meadowbank 3G	500	
Lothian Thistle Hutchison Vale	Edinburgh	Saughton Sports Complex	1,000	
Ormiston	Ormiston	Recreation Park	2,000	
Peebles Rovers	Peebles	Whitestone Park	2,250	
Spartans Reserves	Edinburgh	Ainslie Park	3,000	
Stirling University Reserves	Stirling	Gannochy Sports Centre	1,000	
Tynecastle	Edinburgh	Fernieside Recreation Ground	1,500	

== League table ==
Pos	Team	Pld	W	D	L	GF	GA	GD	Pts	Promotion or qualification
1	Leith Athletic (C)	28	24	0	4	103	23	+80	72	Ineligible for promotion to Lowland League
2	Lothian Thistle Hutchison Vale	28	20	3	5	99	42	+57	63	
3	Civil Service Strollers	28	18	1	9	74	49	+25	55	Transferred to Lowland League
4	Tynecastle	28	16	4	8	72	71	+1	52	
5	Hawick Royal Albert	28	15	3	10	70	50	+20	48	Transferred to Lowland League
6	Peebles Rovers	28	13	4	11	57	60	−3	43	
7	Spartans Reserves (Note: Spartans Reserves deducted 3 points.)	28	14	2	12	67	61	+6	41	Resigned from the league
8	Ormiston	28	12	5	11	70	70	0	41	
9	Stirling University Reserves	28	10	5	13	65	55	+10	35	
10	Heriot-Watt University	28	9	6	13	61	65	−4	33	
11	Coldstream	28	10	2	16	63	87	−24	32	
12	Craigroyston	28	10	2	16	48	74	−26	32	Resigned membership, joined SJFA East Region South Division
13	Burntisland Shipyard	28	8	3	17	43	67	−24	27	
14	Duns	28	4	2	22	46	88	−42	14	
15	Eyemouth United (Note: Eyemouth deducted 6 points.)	28	5	2	21	39	115	−76	11	
16	Kelso United	0	0	0	0	0	0	0	0	Resigned membership, results expunged

Source: East of Scotland Football League
Rules for classification: 1) Points; 2) Goal difference; 3) Number of goals scored
(C) Champions
