= 2016–17 East of Scotland Football League =

East of Scotland Football League
- Season: 2016–17
- Dates: 3 September 2016 – 13 May 2017
- Champions: Lothian Thistle Hutchison Vale
- Matches: 110
- Goals: 503 (4.57 per match)
- Biggest home win: Eyemouth United 10–0 Burntisland Shipyard (1 October 2016)
- Biggest away win: Tweedmouth Rangers 0–11 Lothian Thistle Hutchison Vale (10 May 2017)
- Highest scoring: Tweedmouth Rangers 0–11 Lothian Thistle Hutchison Vale (10 May 2017)

The 2016–17 East of Scotland Football League (known for sponsorship reasons as the Central Taxis East of Scotland League) was the 88th season of the East of Scotland Football League, and the 3rd season as the sixth tier of the Scottish football pyramid system. The season began on 3 September 2016 and finished on 13 May 2017. Leith Athletic were the defending champions.

The league was reduced to a 12-team division following the departure of Civil Service Strollers and Hawick Royal Albert who left to join the Lowland Football League, Craigroyston who left to join the Scottish Junior Football Association and Spartans Reserves who withdrew.

Tweedmouth Rangers joined from the North Northumberland League, however Duns resigned before the season began.

== Teams ==
Location of teams in 2016–17 East of Scotland Football League

The following teams have changed division since the 2015–16 season.

=== To East of Scotland Football League ===
Transferred from North Northumberland Football League

- Tweedmouth Rangers

=== From East of Scotland Football League ===
Transferred to Lowland Football League

- Civil Service Strollers
- Hawick Royal Albert

Transferred to East South Division

- Craigroyston

Team	Location	Home ground	Capacity	Ref.
Burntisland Shipyard	Burntisland	Recreation Park	1,000	
Coldstream	Coldstream	Home Park	1,000	
Duns	Duns	New Hawthorn Park	1,000	
Eyemouth United	Eyemouth	Warner Park	2,000	
Heriot-Watt University	Edinburgh	Riccarton Campus	1,800	
Leith Athletic	Edinburgh	Meadowbank 3G	500	
Lothian Thistle Hutchison Vale	Edinburgh	Saughton Sports Complex	1,000	
Ormiston	Ormiston	Recreation Park	2,000	
Peebles Rovers	Peebles	Whitestone Park	2,250	
Stirling University Reserves	Stirling	Gannochy Sports Centre	1,000	
Tweedmouth Rangers	Berwick-upon-Tweed	Old Shielfield	1,000	
Tynecastle	Edinburgh	Fernieside Recreation Ground	1,500	

== League table ==
Pos	Team	Pld	W	D	L	GF	GA	GD	Pts	Promotion or qualification
1	Lothian Thistle Hutchison Vale (C)	20	17	2	1	85	16	+69	53	Ineligible for promotion to Lowland League
2	Leith Athletic	20	15	2	3	80	18	+62	47	
3	Tynecastle	20	14	1	5	56	26	+30	43	
4	Heriot-Watt University	20	12	3	5	61	30	+31	39	
5	Coldstream	20	9	4	7	39	51	−12	31	
6	Stirling University Reserves	20	9	3	8	55	36	+19	30	
7	Eyemouth United	20	7	2	11	34	53	−19	23	
8	Peebles Rovers	20	6	1	13	28	45	−17	19	
9	Ormiston	20	4	0	16	25	57	−32	12	
10	Tweedmouth Rangers	20	3	3	14	28	77	−49	12	
11	Burntisland Shipyard	20	3	1	16	12	94	−82	10	
12	Duns	0	0	0	0	0	0	0	0	Club resigned membership, results expunged

Source: East of Scotland Football League
Rules for classification: 1) Points; 2) Goal difference; 3) Number of goals scored
(C) Champions
