= 2014–15 East of Scotland Football League =

The 2014–15 East of Scotland Football League (known for sponsorship reasons as the Central Taxis East of Scotland League) was the 86th season of the East of Scotland Football League, and the 1st season as the sixth tier of the Scottish football pyramid system. The season began on 9 August 2014 and ended on 16 May 2015. Lothian Thistle Hutchison Vale were the defending champions.

The league was split into two separate divisions, the Premier Division and the First Division. This season saw the departure of Edinburgh University who left to join the Lowland Football League.

This was the first season in which the divisions were added to the Scottish league pyramid at levels six and seven. It was proposed that the winner of the Premier Division would compete in a play-off with the winner of the 2014–15 South of Scotland Football League (Wigtown & Bladnoch) for a place in the 2015–16 Lowland Football League, subject to relevant licensing and ground criteria. As both champions failed to match the valid licensing criteria, no play-off took place and Lothian Thistle Hutchison Vale remained in the division for the following season.

This was the last season of the two-division setup until it returned for the 2019–20 season.

== Premier Division ==
East of Scotland Football League Premier Division
- Season: 2014–15
- Champions: Lothian Thistle Hutchison Vale
- Relegated: None
- Matches: 108
- Goals: 434 (4.02 per match)

The 2014–15 Premier Division saw a reduction in the number of clubs from ten to nine with fixtures being played over 24 rounds. The amendment to the number of member clubs was due to the departure of Edinburgh University to the Lowland Football League. As a result, Civil Service Strollers retained their place in the division despite finishing in the previous season's relegation places.

Following Easthouses Lily's move to junior football at the end of the season, no team was relegated and all Premier Division clubs joined their First Division counterparts to form one division for the 2015–16 season.

=== Teams ===
Location of teams in 2014–15 East of Scotland Football League Premier Division
Location of teams in 2014–15 East of Scotland Football League Premier Division within Edinburgh

The following teams changed division prior to the 2013–14 season.

==== To Premier Division ====
Promoted from First Division

- Easthouses Lily

==== From Premier Division ====
Transferred to Lowland Football League

- Edinburgh University

Relegated to First Division

- Heriot-Watt University

Team	Location	Home ground	Capacity	Ref.
Civil Service Strollers	Edinburgh	Telford College Sports Ground	1,000	
Coldstream	Coldstream	Home Park	1,000	
Craigroyston	Edinburgh	St Mark’s Park	2,000	
Easthouses Lily	Dalkeith	Newbattle Complex	1,500	
Leith Athletic	Edinburgh	Meadowbank 3G	500	
Lothian Thistle Hutchison Vale	Edinburgh	Saughton Sports Complex	1,000	
Spartans Reserves	Edinburgh	Ainslie Park	3,000	
Stirling University Reserves	Stirling	Gannochy Sports Centre	1,000	
Tynecastle	Edinburgh	Fernieside Recreation Ground	1,500	

=== League table ===
Pos	Team	Pld	W	D	L	GF	GA	GD	Pts	Promotion or qualification
1	Lothian Thistle Hutchison Vale (C)	24	16	4	4	70	36	+34	52	Ineligible for promotion to Lowland League
2	Easthouses Lily	24	16	4	4	65	42	+23	52	Resigned membership, joined SJFA East Region South Division
3	Leith Athletic	24	14	5	5	62	33	+29	47	
4	Tynecastle	24	9	7	8	48	41	+7	34	
5	Civil Service Strollers	24	9	6	9	45	42	+3	33	
6	Spartans reserves	24	9	5	10	44	46	−2	32	
7	Stirling University reserves	24	5	4	15	36	59	−23	19	
8	Craigroyston	24	4	6	14	29	59	−30	18	
9	Coldstream	24	2	7	15	35	76	−41	13	

Source: East of Scotland Football League
Rules for classification: 1) Points; 2) Goal difference; 3) Number of goals scored
(C) Champions

== First Division ==
East of Scotland Football League First Division
- Season: 2014–15
- Champions: Peebles Rovers
- Promoted: All First Division clubs
- Matches: 112
- Goals: 473 (4.22 per match)

The First Division also saw a reduction in member clubs from ten down to eight, with each team playing 28 fixtures. The reduction in numbers was caused by the reserve teams of Berwick Rangers and last season's winners Hibernian resigning from the league. After the season all First Division clubs joined their Premier Division counterparts to form one division for 2014–15.

=== Teams ===
The following teams changed division prior to the 2013–14 season.

==== To First Division ====
Relegated from Premier Division

- Heriot-Watt University

==== From First Division ====
Promoted to Premier Division

- Easthouses Lily
Location of teams in 2014–15 East of Scotland Football League Premier Division

Team	Location	Home ground	Capacity	Ref.
Burntisland Shipyard	Burntisland	Recreation Park	1,000	
Duns	Duns	New Hawthorn Park	1,000	
Eyemouth United	Eyemouth	Warner Park	2,000	
Hawick Royal Albert	Hawick	Albert Park	1,000	
Heriot-Watt University	Edinburgh	Riccarton Campus	1,800	
Kelso	Kelso	Woodside Park	1,200	
Ormiston	Ormiston	Recreation Park	2,000	
Peebles Rovers	Peebles	Whitestone Park	2,250	

=== League table ===
Pos	Team	Pld	W	D	L	GF	GA	GD	Pts	Promotion
1	Peebles Rovers (C)	28	22	4	2	85	29	+56	70	All clubs joined Premier Division
2	Heriot-Watt University	28	17	5	6	74	34	+40	56	
3	Duns	28	17	4	7	84	54	+30	55	
4	Ormiston	28	16	1	11	63	60	+3	49	
5	Burntisland Shipyard	28	12	7	9	64	47	+17	43	
6	Eyemouth United	28	7	0	21	46	90	−44	21	
7	Kelso United	28	4	3	21	27	73	−46	15	
8	Hawick Royal Albert	28	4	2	22	30	86	−56	14	

Source: East of Scotland Football League
Rules for classification: 1) Points; 2) Goal difference; 3) Number of goals scored
(C) Champions
