= 2019–20 Scottish Cup =

2019–20 William Hill Scottish Cup
Tournament details
- Country: Scotland
- Teams: 102

Final positions
- Champions: Celtic
- Runners-up: Heart of Midlothian

Tournament statistics
- Matches played: 114
- Goals scored: 408 (3.58 per match)
- Top goal scorer: Sean Stewart (6 goals)
- All statistics correct as of 20 December 2020.

The 2019–20 Scottish Cup was the 135th season of Scotland's most prestigious football knockout competition. The tournament was sponsored by bookmaker William Hill in what was the final season of a nine-year partnership, after contract negotiations saw the initial five-year contract extended for an additional four years in October 2015. This was the first season in which a match from every round of the tournament proper is broadcast live via TV partners Premier Sports and BBC Scotland, with one match per rounds 1–3 being shown live on the BBC Scotland channel for the first time.

The defending champions were Celtic who won the 2019 Scottish Cup Final on 25 May 2019.

On 13 March 2020, the competition was indefinitely suspended due to the COVID-19 pandemic. The competition resumed with the semi-finals on the weekend of 31 October and was completed with the final on 20 December 2020. The three matches at Hampden Park were played behind closed doors due to Scottish Government restrictions.

== Calendar ==
The calendar for the 2019–20 Scottish Cup, as announced by Scottish Football Association.

Round	Main date	Number of fixtures	Clubs	New Entries	Leagues entering at this round
Preliminary round 1	10 August 2019	13	102 → 89	27	
Preliminary round 2	31 August 2019	7	89 → 82	None	
First round	21 September 2019	18	82 → 64	29	16 Highland League teams 13 Lowland League teams
Second round	19 October 2019	16	64 → 48	14	10 League Two teams 1 Highland League team 3 Lowland League teams
Third round	23 November 2019	16	48 → 32	16	6 Championship teams 10 League One teams
Fourth round	18 January 2020	16	32 → 16	16	12 Premiership teams 4 Championship teams
Fifth round	8 February 2020	8	16 → 8	None	
Quarter-finals	29 February 2020	4	8 → 4	None	
Semi-finals	11 April 2020	2	4 → 2	None	
Final	9 May 2020	1	2 → 1	None	

== Preliminary rounds ==
The first preliminary round took place on 10 August 2019 and the second preliminary round took place on 31 August 2019. A total of 27 teams competed in the preliminary rounds with seven teams advancing to the first round.

=== Draw ===
The draw for the preliminary rounds took place on Thursday, 18 July 2019 at Hampden Park and was made by Scotland internationals Lee Alexander and Leanne Crichton.

27 clubs were involved in the draw, of which one received a bye to the second preliminary round, while the other 26 entered the first preliminary round. The teams competing in these rounds were made up of teams from the East of Scotland Football League (16), South of Scotland Football League (4), North Caledonian Football League (1), Scottish Junior Football Association (4) and the Scottish Amateur Football Association (2).

Blackburn United, Broxburn Athletic, Dundonald Bluebell, Easthouses Lily Miners Welfare, Hill of Beath Hawthorn, Jeanfield Swifts, and Penicuik Athletic took part in the Scottish Cup for the first time having each gained their Club Licence, along with Camelon Juniors who made their debut as 2018–19 South & East Cup-Winners Shield winners.

There were three parts to the draw. The first part determined which club, from the 23 eligible, received a bye to the second preliminary round. The clubs which did not receive a bye into the second preliminary round entered the first preliminary round. Thirteen ties were then drawn in the first preliminary round to be played on Saturday, 10 August 2019. The final part of the draw saw seven ties drawn in the second preliminary round to be played on Saturday, 31 August 2019.

Clubs with a valid Club Licence at the date of the draw were eligible for a bye to the second preliminary round. Teams in Bold advanced to the first round.

Clubs eligible for a bye	Clubs participating in the first preliminary round draw
1. **Banks O’Dee**; 2. Blackburn United; 3. **Broxburn Athletic**; 4. Burntisland Shipyard; 5. Coldstream; 6. Dundonald Bluebell; 7. Easthouses Lily Miners Welfare; 8. Girvan; 9. Glasgow University; 10. Golspie Sutherland; 11. Hawick Royal Albert United; 12. **Hill of Beath Hawthorn**; 13. Jeanfield Swifts; 14. **Linlithgow Rose**; 15. Lothian Thistle Hutchison Vale; 16. Newton Stewart; 17. **Penicuik Athletic**; 18. Preston Athletic; 19. St Cuthbert Wanderers; 20. Threave Rovers; 21. Tynecastle; 22. Whitehill Welfare; 23. Wigtown & Bladnoch	24. **Auchinleck Talbot** ^{(2018–19 West Region Premiership & Junior Cup winners)}; 25. Camelon Juniors ^{(2018–19 South & East of Scotland Cup-Winners Shield)}; 26. Colville Park ^{(2018–19 Scottish Amateur Cup winners)}; 27. **Lochee United** ^{(2018–19 East Superleague winners)}

=== Preliminary round one ===
Golspie Sutherland received a bye to preliminary round two.

==== Matches ====
10 August 2019	**Linlithgow Rose**	**2–1**	Preston Athletic	Linlithgow
14:30	Slaven 48'; Smith 55'		Grotlin 83'	Stadium: Prestonfield; Attendance: 328; Referee: Jordan Paterson

10 August 2019	St Cuthbert Wanderers	**1–7**	**Girvan**	Kirkcudbright
15:00	Lawrie 60'		Harvey 23', 43'; Bell 47', 81', 89'; Thirtle 62'; Love 77'	Stadium: St Mary's Park; Referee: Stewart Luke

10 August 2019	**Broxburn Athletic**	**2–0**	Tynecastle	Broxburn
15:00	Kelly 10'; Miller 20'			Stadium: Albyn Park; Attendance: 177; Referee: Craig Napier

10 August 2019	**Banks O’Dee**	**5–0**	Glasgow University	Aberdeen
15:00	Gilmour 15'; Henderson 54', 67'; Hall 69'; Armstrong 73'			Stadium: Spain Park; Referee: Greg Soutar

10 August 2019	**Hill of Beath Hawthorn**	**2–0**	Blackburn United	Hill of Beath
15:00	Watt 5'; Elder 83'			Stadium: Keir's Park; Attendance: 219; Referee: Duncan Williams

10 August 2019	Easthouses Lily Miners Welfare	**1–6**	**Penicuik Athletic**	Easthouses
15:00	Young 50'		Somerville 21'; Stewart 30', 55', 66'; Jones 33'; Viola 68'	Stadium: Newbattle Complex; Attendance: 188; Referee: Alastair Grieve

10 August 2019	Dundonald Bluebell	**2–2**	Auchinleck Talbot	Cardenden
15:00	J. Smith 73'; Ness 74'		Samson 23'; G. Wilson 76' (pen.)	Stadium: Moorside Park; Attendance: 604; Referee: Grant Irvine

10 August 2019	**Camelon Juniors**	**4–0**	Newton Stewart	Camelon
15:00	McKenzie 54'; Daramola 67'; McMullan 82', 87'			Stadium: Carmuirs Park; Attendance: 232; Referee: Chris Gentles

10 August 2019	Coldstream	**1–9**	**Jeanfield Swifts**	Coldstream
15:00	Briggs 45'		Smith 5', 28', 68'; McLaren 25'; Sinclair 27'; Kennedy 65'; Scott 83', 86', 88'	Stadium: Home Park; Attendance: 170; Referee: Craig Wilson

10 August 2019	Hawick Royal Albert United	**1–6**	**Threave Rovers**	Hawick
15:00	Scott 85'		Jamieson 29'; Thom 35', 84'; Milligan 39', 57', 61'	Stadium: Albert Park; Attendance: 101; Referee: Alex Shepherd

10 August 2019	**Lochee United**	**7–0**	Burntisland Shipyard	Dundee
15:00	Ritchie 1', 60'; Cavanagh 9'; Millar 14'; Buchan 43', 49'; Blair 47'			Stadium: Thomson Park; Attendance: 160; Referee: Steven Kirkland

17 August 2019	**Lothian Thistle Hutchison Vale**	**5–0**	Wigtown & Bladnoch	Broxburn
16:00	Wringe 5', 13'; Cunningham 39'; Moore 28'; Hendry 78'			Stadium: Albyn Park; Referee: Chris McNab

18 August 2019	Colville Park	**0–4**	**Whitehill Welfare**	Glasgow
14:00			Somerville 12'; Lough 37'; McIlroy 43' (o.g.); Connell 83'	Stadium: New Tinto Park; Referee: William Wilson

==== Replay ====
17 August 2019	**Auchinleck Talbot**	**6–1**	Dundonald Bluebell	Auchinleck
15:00	Samson 4', 56'; G. Wilson 19'; Glasgow 39', 41'; Shankland 82'		Gay 81'	Stadium: Beechwood Park; Referee: Grant Irvine

=== Preliminary round two ===
==== Matches ====
31 August 2019	Whitehill Welfare	**0–1**	**Penicuik Athletic**	Rosewell
14:30			McCrory-Irving 57'	Stadium: Ferguson Park; Attendance: 226; Referee: Robert Thomson

31 August 2019	Girvan	**0–1**	**Broxburn Athletic**	Girvan
15:00			Kelly 12'	Stadium: Hamilton Park; Referee: Ryan Lee

31 August 2019	**Banks O’Dee**	**2–0**	Golspie Sutherland	Aberdeen
15:00	MacLeod 38'; Philipson 68'			Stadium: Spain Park; Referee: Jordan Curran

31 August 2019	Threave Rovers	**0–2**	**Hill of Beath Hawthorn**	Castle Douglas
15:00			Kinninmonth 26'; Lumsden 90+3'	Stadium: Meadow Park; Attendance: 93; Referee: Matthew MacDermid

31 August 2019	**Lochee United**	**5–2**	Lothian Thistle Hutchison Vale	Dundee
15:00	Cavanagh 3'; McComiskie 13', 90'; Millar 84'; Milne 54'		Wringe 43'; Smith 69'	Stadium: Thomson Park; Referee: Iain Snedden

31 August 2019	Camelon Juniors	**0–2**	**Auchinleck Talbot**	Camelon
15:00			Shankland 19'; Samson 86'	Stadium: Carmuirs Park; Attendance: 625; Referee: Mike Roncone

7 September 2019	Jeanfield Swifts	**2–5**	**Linlithgow Rose**	Perth
15:00	Davies 67'; Scott 75'		Allum 13', 76'; Coyne 32', 56'; MacLennan 90'	Stadium: Riverside Stadium; Attendance: 340; Referee: Barry Cook

== First round ==
The first round took place on the weekend of 21 September 2019. Along with the seven winners from the second preliminary round, there were 29 new entries at this stage - 16 from the Highland Football League and 13 from the Lowland Football League.

=== Draw ===
The draw for the first round took place on Sunday 1 September 2019 during Sportscene live on BBC Scotland and was made by Scotland squad members Stephen O'Donnell and Craig MacGillivray.

Teams in Italics were not known at the time of the draw. Teams in Bold advanced to the second round.

Highland League	Lowland League	Other
**Buckie Thistle**; **Clachnacuddin**; Deveronvale; **Formartine United**; Forres Mechanics; **Fort William**; Fraserburgh; Huntly; **Inverurie Loco Works**; Keith; Lossiemouth; Nairn County; **Rothes**; **Strathspey Thistle**; Turriff United; Wick Academy	**Bonnyrigg Rose Athletic**; Caledonian Braves; Civil Service Strollers; Cumbernauld Colts; Dalbeattie Star; East Stirlingshire; Edinburgh University; **Gala Fairydean Rovers**; **Gretna 2008**; Kelty Hearts; **Spartans**; **Stirling University**; Vale of Leithen	East of Scotland teams: **Broxburn Athletic**; Hill of Beath Hawthorn; **Linlithgow Rose**; **Penicuik Athletic**; SJFA teams: **Auchinleck Talbot**; **Banks O’Dee**; **Lochee United**

=== Matches ===
20 September 2019	Kelty Hearts	**0–3**	**Auchinleck Talbot**	Kelty
19:05			McCracken 20'; Samson 44'; Shankland 50'	Stadium: New Central Park; Attendance: 1,633; Referee: Mike Roncone

21 September 2019	**Broxburn Athletic**	**3–2**	East Stirlingshire	Broxburn
15:00	Miller 4', 12', 90'		Low 40'; Rodgers 84'	Stadium: Albyn Park; Referee: Dan McFarlane

21 September 2019	**Buckie Thistle**	**4–1**	Civil Service Strollers	Buckie
15:00	Munro 4'; MacAskill 17'; Fraser 36'; Cowie 74'		Muirhead 62'	Stadium: Victoria Park; Referee: Jordan Curran

21 September 2019	Caledonian Braves	**3–4**	**Rothes**	Motherwell
15:00	McNeil 54'; Galasso 81'; McDowall 89'		Sutherland 16', 52'; Cormack 18', 77'	Stadium: Alliance Park; Referee: Michael McCart

21 September 2019	Cumbernauld Colts	**1–5**	**Penicuik Athletic**	Cumbernauld
15:00	Holmes 69'		Stewart 29', 78'; Stevenson 37'; Ponton 41'; Jones 87'	Stadium: Broadwood Stadium; Referee: Liam Duncan

21 September 2019	Dalbeattie Star	**1–3**	**Gala Fairydean Rovers**	Dalbeattie
15:00	Sloan 61'		Galantes 25'; Kelly 32'; Murray 71'	Stadium: Islecroft Stadium; Referee: Calum Scott

21 September 2019	Edinburgh University	**1–3**	**Lochee United**	Edinburgh
15:00	Baird 75'		McComiskie 58', 81'; Lawson 90+3'	Stadium: East Peffermill; Referee: Kevin Graham

21 September 2019	Forres Mechanics	**1–4**	**Banks O’Dee**	Forres
15:00	Duncanson 50'		Armstrong 54'; Gilmour 68'; Winton 86'; Binnie 90+2'	Stadium: Mosset Park; Referee: Colin Whyte

21 September 2019	**Fort William**	**5–0**	Vale of Leithen	Fort William
15:00	Andrew 5'; Nevison 47'; Gunn 58', 73'; Kennedy 75'			Stadium: Claggan Park; Referee: Connor Ashwood

21 September 2019	Fraserburgh	**0–1**	**Bonnyrigg Rose Athletic**	Fraserburgh
15:00			Hunter 89'	Stadium: Bellslea Park; Referee: Scott Leslie

21 September 2019	**Gretna 2008**	**1–0**	Hill of Beath Hawthorn	Gretna
15:00	Smales 60'			Stadium: Raydale Park; Referee: Matthew MacDermid

21 September 2019	**Inverurie Loco Works**	**3–2**	Wick Academy	Inverurie
15:00	Angus 55', 67', 71'		Gunn 6', 32'	Stadium: Harlaw Park; Referee: George Calder

21 September 2019	**Linlithgow Rose**	**1–0**	Huntly	Linlithgow
15:00	Coyne 60'			Stadium: Prestonfield; Referee: William Wilson

21 September 2019	Keith	**2–3**	**Stirling University**	Keith
15:00	MacAskill 48'; Keith 59'		Doan 38'; Burrows 68'; Heath 73'	Stadium: Kynoch Park; Referee: Stewart Luke

21 September 2019	Nairn County	**0–0**	Clachnacuddin	Nairn
15:00				Stadium: Station Park; Referee: Ryan Lee

21 September 2019	Spartans	**1–1**	Deveronvale	Edinburgh
15:00	Dawson 26'		Noble 34'	Stadium: Ainslie Park; Referee: Gary Hanvidge

21 September 2019	**Strathspey Thistle**	**2–1**	Lossiemouth	Grantown-on-Spey
15:00	Rennie 24'; Taylor 50'		Allen 49'	Stadium: Seafield Park; Referee: Filippo Mazzoni

21 September 2019	Turriff United	**1–5**	**Formartine United**	Turriff
15:00	Grant 50'		Kelly 15'; Wood 23'; Lisle 32'; Buxton 55' (o.g.); McGowan 68'	Stadium: The Haughs; Referee: Bart Misiak

=== Replays ===
28 September 2019	**Clachnacuddin**	**2–1**	Nairn County	Inverness
15:00	Lawrie 22'; Webb 78'		Shewan 90'	Stadium: Grant Street Park

30 September 2019	Deveronvale	**1–2**	**Spartans**	Banff
20:00	Dunbar 33'		Murrell 21'; Reid 90'	Stadium: Princess Royal Park

== Second round ==
The second round took place on the weekend of 19 October 2019. Along with the 18 winners from the first round, there were 14 new entries at this stage - one from the Highland Football League (Brora Rangers), three from the Lowland Football League (Berwick Rangers, BSC Glasgow and East Kilbride) and all 10 teams from League Two.

=== Draw ===
The draw for the second round took place on Sunday 22 September 2019 during Sportscene live on BBC Scotland and was made by Kenny Miller and Kris Doolan.

Teams in italics were not known at the time of the draw. Teams in Bold advanced to the third round.

League Two	Highland League	Lowland League	Other
**Albion Rovers**; **Annan Athletic**; Brechin City; Cove Rangers; Cowdenbeath; **Edinburgh City**; **Elgin City**; **Queen's Park**; Stenhousemuir; **Stirling Albion**	**Brora Rangers**; Buckie Thistle; Clachnacuddin; **Formartine United**; Fort William; **Inverurie Loco Works**; Rothes; Strathspey Thistle	Berwick Rangers; **Bonnyrigg Rose Athletic**; **BSC Glasgow**; **East Kilbride**; Gala Fairydean Rovers; Gretna 2008; Spartans; Stirling University	East of Scotland teams: **Broxburn Athletic**; **Linlithgow Rose**; **Penicuik Athletic**; SJFA teams: **Auchinleck Talbot**; Banks O’Dee; Lochee United

=== Matches ===
18 October 2019	**Bonnyrigg Rose Athletic**	**2–0**	Buckie Thistle	Bonnyrigg
19:05	Stewart 54'; Hunter 67'			Stadium: New Dundas Park; Attendance: 1,693

18 October 2019	**Edinburgh City**	**3–1**	Banks O' Dee	Edinburgh
19:30	Handling 23', 85'; McIntyre 41'		Winton 40'	Stadium: Ainslie Park; Attendance: 205

19 October 2019	**Auchinleck Talbot**	**1–0**	Cove Rangers	Auchinleck
14:30	Hyslop 88'			Stadium: Beechwood Park; Attendance: 750; Referee: Kevin Graham

19 October 2019	Albion Rovers	**1–1**	Fort William	Coatbridge
15:00	Breen 33'		Hastings 80'	Stadium: Cliftonhill; Attendance: 489; Referee: Craig Napier

19 October 2019	**East Kilbride**	**3–1**	Gretna 2008	East Kilbride
15:00	Woods 5'; McGrath 21', 80'		Rogers 18'	Stadium: K-Park Training Academy; Attendance: 237; Referee: William Wilson

19 October 2019	Cowdenbeath	**1–1**	Broxburn Athletic	Cowdenbeath
15:00	Cox 74'		Locke 88'	Stadium: Central Park; Attendance: 767; Referee: Chris Graham

19 October 2019	Clachnacuddin	**0–7**	**Brora Rangers**	Inverness
15:00			Brindle 17', 21'; MacDonald 38', 70'; Pickles 41'; Wagenaar 67'; MacLean 83'	Stadium: Grant Street Park; Referee: Connor Ashwood

19 October 2019	Rothes	**1–3**	**Inverurie Loco Works**	Rothes
15:00	Maley 90'		Angus 22', 32'; McLean 51'	Stadium: Mackessack Park; Attendance: 200; Referee: Jordan Paterson

19 October 2019	Spartans	**0–2**	**Queen's Park**	Edinburgh
15:00			Agyeman 33'; Galt 34'	Stadium: Ainslie Park; Attendance: 411; Referee: Graham Grainger

19 October 2019	**Elgin City**	**3–1**	Berwick Rangers	Elgin
15:00	Cameron 4'; Hester 48'; Sutherland 78'		Barr 31'	Stadium: Borough Briggs; Attendance: 554; Referee: Calum Scott

19 October 2019	Formartine United	**2–2**	Gala Fairydean Rovers	Pitmedden
15:00	Wood 49'; Park 78'		MacKenzie 36'; Campbell 68'	Stadium: North Lodge Park; Referee: Stewart Luke

19 October 2019	Annan Athletic	**2–2**	Brechin City	Annan
15:00	Muir 28', 40'		Barr 54' (o.g.); McManus 86'	Stadium: Galabank; Attendance: 274; Referee: Colin Steven

19 October 2019	Lochee United	**1–1**	BSC Glasgow	Dundee
15:00	Lawson 37'		McMillan 50'	Stadium: Thomson Park; Attendance: 270; Referee: Dan McFarlane

19 October 2019	**Stirling Albion**	**2–0**	Strathspey Thistle	Stirling
15:00	Heaver 8', 45'			Stadium: Forthbank Stadium; Attendance: 411; Referee: Chris Fordyce

20 October 2019	Stirling University	**0–2**	**Linlithgow Rose**	Stirling
15:00			Coyne 50' (pen.), 90'	Stadium: Forthbank Stadium; Attendance: 455; Referee: Jordan Curran

26 October 2019	**Penicuik Athletic**	**3–0**	Stenhousemuir	Penicuik
14:30	Stevenson 51'; Baptie 56'; Stewart 83'			Stadium: Penicuik Park; Attendance: 1,249; Referee: Lloyd Wilson

=== Replays ===
26 October 2019	Brechin City	**0–2**	**Annan Athletic**	Brechin
15:00			McLean 61', 90' (pen.)	Stadium: Glebe Park; Attendance: 258; Referee: Colin Steven

26 October 2019	**Broxburn Athletic**	**3–0**	Cowdenbeath	Broxburn
15:00	Miller 43'; Scott 73'; Kelly 82'			Stadium: Albyn Park; Attendance: 1,059; Referee: Chris Graham

26 October 2019	Fort William	**0–5**	**Albion Rovers**	Fort William
15:00			Breen 19'; See 21', 27'; Osadolor 43'; Roberts 87'	Stadium: Claggan Park; Referee: Duncan Williams

26 October 2019	Gala Fairydean Rovers	**1–2**	**Formartine United**	Galashiels
15:00	Campbell 67'		Wood 59'; Smith 73'	Stadium: Netherdale; Attendance: 200; Referee: Stewart Luke

27 October 2019	**BSC Glasgow**	**2–1**	Lochee United	Alloa
15:30	McKay 28'; Hamilton 54'		Davie 85' (pen.)	Stadium: Recreation Park; Referee: Dan McFarlane

== Third round ==
The third round took place on the weekend of 23 November 2019. Along with the 16 winners from the second round, there were 16 new entries at this stage - all 10 from League One, and six from the Championship.

=== Draw ===
The draw for the third round took place on Sunday 20 October 2019 during Sportscene live on BBC Scotland.

Teams in Italics were not known at the time of the draw. Teams in Bold advanced to the fourth round.

Championship	League One	League Two	Other
**Alloa Athletic**; **Arbroath**; Dunfermline Athletic; **Greenock Morton**; **Partick Thistle**; Queen of the South	**Airdrieonians**; **Clyde**; **Dumbarton**; East Fife; **Falkirk**; Forfar Athletic; Montrose; Peterhead; **Raith Rovers**; **Stranraer**	Albion Rovers; Annan Athletic; **Edinburgh City**; Elgin City; **Queen's Park**; Stirling Albion	Highland League teams: Brora Rangers; Formartine United; Inverurie Loco Works; Lowland League teams: **Bonnyrigg Rose Athletic**; **BSC Glasgow**; **East Kilbride**; East of Scotland teams: **Broxburn Athletic**; Linlithgow Rose; Penicuik Athletic; SJFA teams: Auchinleck Talbot

=== Matches ===
22 November 2019	Linlithgow Rose	**1–4**	**Falkirk**	Linlithgow
19:05	Coyne 20'		Sammon 8', 30'; McManus 78'; Dixon 85'	Stadium: Prestonfield; Attendance: 1,720; Referee: Grant Irvine

23 November 2019	Auchinleck Talbot	**1–1**	Arbroath	Auchinleck
13:45	Hyslop 11'		McKenna 84' (pen.)	Stadium: Beechwood Park; Attendance: 921; Referee: David Lowe

23 November 2019	**Stranraer**	**1–0**	Dunfermline Athletic	Stranraer
15:00	Hilton 61' (pen.)			Stadium: Stair Park; Attendance: 431; Referee: Alan Newlands

23 November 2019	**Dumbarton**	**3–1**	Forfar Athletic	Dumbarton
15:00	Frizzell 9'; McGeever 72'; Layne 78'		Tapping 20'	Stadium: Dumbarton Football Stadium; Attendance: 424; Referee: Craig Fordyce

23 November 2019	**Raith Rovers**	**1–0**	Peterhead	Kirkcaldy
15:00	Bowie 3'			Stadium: Stark's Park; Attendance: 1,306; Referee: Steven Reid

23 November 2019	Elgin City	**1–3**	**Alloa Athletic**	Elgin
15:00	MacEwan 26'		Taggart 48'; Cawley 58'; O'Hara 63'	Stadium: Borough Briggs; Attendance: 668; Referee: Scott Lambie

23 November 2019	Greenock Morton	**1–1**	Brora Rangers	Greenock
15:00	McHugh 44' (pen.)		Gillespie 29' (pen.)	Stadium: Cappielow; Attendance: 925; Referee: Craig Napier

23 November 2019	Formartine United	**0–4**	**East Kilbride**	Pitmedden
15:00			Paton 20', 74'; Brady 48'; Holmes 58'	Stadium: North Lodge Park; Referee: Graham Grainger

23 November 2019	**Partick Thistle**	**1–0**	Penicuik Athletic	Glasgow
15:00	Cole 1'			Stadium: Firhill Stadium; Attendance: 3,165; Referee: Mike Roncone

23 November 2019	Albion Rovers	**1–4**	**Airdrieonians**	Coatbridge
15:00	Crighton 51' (o.g.)		Roberts 13'; Crighton 60', 83'; MacDonald 87'	Stadium: Cliftonhill; Attendance: 1,127; Referee: Kevin Graham

23 November 2019	Queen of the South	**1–2**	**Queen's Park**	Dumfries
15:00	Murray 90+2'		Kouider-Aïssa 15', 30'	Stadium: Palmerston Park; Attendance: 1,066; Referee: David Dickinson

23 November 2019	**Edinburgh City**	**4–3**	Annan Athletic	Edinburgh
15:00	Henderson 21', 24'; Court 28'; Harris 49'		Flanagan 48', 80'; Muir 69' (pen.)	Stadium: Ainslie Park; Attendance: 176; Referee: Duncan Williams

23 November 2019	Stirling Albion	**0–2**	**Clyde**	Stirling
15:00			Smith 45'; Goodwillie 90+1' (pen.)	Stadium: Forthbank Stadium; Attendance: 820; Referee: Lloyd Wilson

23 November 2019	East Fife	**3–4**	**BSC Glasgow**	Methil
15:00	Dowds 16'; Watt 44'; Watson 53'		Orr 5', 90+1'; Collins 57'; Hughes 76' (pen.)	Stadium: Bayview Stadium; Attendance: 484; Referee: Matthew McDermid

23 November 2019	Inverurie Loco Works	**0–1**	**Broxburn Athletic**	Inverurie
15:00			Miller 84'	Stadium: Harlaw Park; Referee: Calum Scott

23 November 2019	**Bonnyrigg Rose Athletic**	**2–1**	Montrose	Bonnyrigg
15:00	Moyes 18'; Brown 45+1'		R. Campbell 43'	Stadium: New Dundas Park; Attendance: 2,017; Referee: John McKendrick

=== Replays ===
27 November 2019	**Arbroath**	**3–0**	Auchinleck Talbot	Arbroath
19:45	McKenna 26'; Linn 54'; Stewart 64'			Stadium: Gayfield Park; Attendance: 1,022; Referee: David Lowe

3 December 2019	Brora Rangers	**1–3**	**Greenock Morton**	Brora
19:45	Williamson 65'		Lyon 18'; Cadden 49', 53'	Stadium: Dudgeon Park; Attendance: 497; Referee: Craig Napier

== Fourth round ==
The fourth round took place on the weekend of 18 January 2020. Along with the 16 winners from the third round, there were 16 new entries at this stage - the remaining four clubs from the Championship, and all 12 from the Premiership.

=== Draw ===
The draw for the fourth round took place on Sunday 24 November 2019 during Sportscene live on BBC Scotland. Broxburn Athletic, the lowest ranked team left in the competition, were drawn against Premiership club St Mirren (54 places above them), which at the time represented the biggest league position gap between two teams in the competition's history since the pyramid system was introduced.

Teams in Italics were not known at the time of the draw. Teams in Bold advanced to the fifth round.

Premiership	Championship	League One	League Two	Other
**Aberdeen**; **Celtic**; **Hamilton Academical**; **Heart of Midlothian**; **Hibernian**; **Kilmarnock**; **Livingston**; **Motherwell**; **Rangers**; Ross County; **St Johnstone**; **St Mirren**	Alloa Athletic; Arbroath; **Ayr United**; Dundee; Dundee United; Greenock Morton; **Inverness Caledonian Thistle**; Partick Thistle	Airdrieonians; **Clyde**; Dumbarton; **Falkirk**; Raith Rovers; Stranraer	Edinburgh City; Queen's Park	Lowland League teams: Bonnyrigg Rose Athletic; **BSC Glasgow**; East Kilbride; East of Scotland teams: Broxburn Athletic

=== Matches ===
17 January 2020	**Rangers**	**2–0**	Stranraer	Glasgow
19:45	Arfield 44'; Defoe 66' (pen.)			Stadium: Ibrox Stadium; Attendance: 38,560; Referee: John Beaton

18 January 2020	**St Mirren**	**3–0**	Broxburn Athletic	Paisley
15:00	Obika 55', 90+1'; Mullen 89'			Stadium: St Mirren Park; Attendance: 4,327; Referee: David Munro

18 January 2020	**Kilmarnock**	**6–0**	Queen's Park	Kilmarnock
15:00	Bruce 9'; Findlay 26', 44'; Kiltie 62'; Kabamba 89'; Johnson 90+1'			Stadium: Rugby Park; Attendance: 4,198; Referee: Colin Steven

18 January 2020	**Heart of Midlothian**	**5–0**	Airdrieonians	Edinburgh
15:00	Irving 7'; Clare 54'; Naismith 58'; Henderson 71'; Halkett 90+1'			Stadium: Tynecastle Park; Attendance: 14,777; Referee: Don Robertson

18 January 2020	Alloa Athletic	**2–3**	**Inverness Caledonian Thistle**	Alloa
15:00	Cawley 18'; O'Hara 75'		Doran 8'; White 61'; Trafford 86'	Stadium: Recreation Park; Attendance: 590; Referee: Willie Collum

18 January 2020	**Livingston**	**3–1**	Raith Rovers	Livingston
15:00	Lawless 77' (pen.), 90+1' (pen.); Dykes 78'		Baird 22'	Stadium: Almondvale Stadium; Attendance: 1,725; Referee: Alan Newlands

18 January 2020	Arbroath	**0–0**	Falkirk	Arbroath
15:00				Stadium: Gayfield Park; Attendance: 1,733; Referee: Greg Aitken

18 January 2020	**Ayr United**	**1–0**	Ross County	Ayr
15:00	Bell 37'			Stadium: Somerset Park; Attendance: 1,538; Referee: Andrew Dallas

18 January 2020	**Aberdeen**	**1–0**	Dumbarton	Aberdeen
15:00	Cosgrove 86' (pen.)			Stadium: Pittodrie Stadium; Attendance: 10,010; Referee: Gavin Duncan

18 January 2020	Bonnyrigg Rose Athletic	**0–1**	**Clyde**	Bonnyrigg
15:00			Love 80'	Stadium: New Dundas Park; Attendance: 2,213; Referee: Peter Stuart

18 January 2020	**St Johnstone**	**3–0**	Greenock Morton	Perth
15:00	Booth 4'; Davidson 57'; May 74'			Stadium: McDiarmid Park; Attendance: 2,397; Referee: Nick Walsh

18 January 2020	**Hamilton Academical**	**5–0**	Edinburgh City	Hamilton
15:00	Dales 22'; McMann 26'; Martin 44'; Winter 80'; Miller 84'			Stadium: New Douglas Park; Attendance: 1,040; Referee: Euan Anderson

18 January 2020	East Kilbride	**1–3**	**BSC Glasgow**	East Kilbride
15:00	Malcolm 79' (pen.)		Collins 1'; McCormack 17'; Grehan 39'	Stadium: K-Park Training Academy; Attendance: 671; Referee: Calum Scott

18 January 2020	Partick Thistle	**1–2**	**Celtic**	Glasgow
17:30	Bannigan 90+3' (pen.)		Griffiths 12'; McGregor 78'	Stadium: Firhill Stadium; Attendance: 9,542; Referee: Alan Muir

18 January 2020	Dundee	**0–3**	**Motherwell**	Dundee
19:20			Long 22', 30', 75'	Stadium: Dens Park; Attendance: 2,407; Referee: Steven McLean

19 January 2020	Dundee United	**2–2**	Hibernian	Dundee
15:00	Shankland 45+3'; Appéré 74'		Doidge 8'; Boyle 47'	Stadium: Tannadice Park; Attendance: 9,400; Referee: Kevin Clancy

=== Replays ===
28 January 2020	**Falkirk**	**2–0**	Arbroath	Falkirk
19:45	McManus 47'; Sammon 66'			Stadium: Falkirk Stadium; Attendance: 2,704; Referee: Euan Anderson

28 January 2020	**Hibernian**	**4–2**	Dundee United	Edinburgh
19:45	Allan 40' (pen.); Doidge 60', 73', 90+1'		Shankland 10'; Sporle 67'	Stadium: Easter Road; Attendance: 10,541; Referee: Kevin Clancy

== Fifth round ==
=== Draw ===
The draw for the fifth round took place on Sunday 19 January 2020 during Sportscene live on BBC Scotland.

Teams in italics were unknown at the time of the draw.

Teams in Bold advanced to the quarter-finals.

Premiership	Championship	League One	Lowland League
**Aberdeen**; **Celtic**; Hamilton Academical; **Heart of Midlothian**; **Hibernian**; Kilmarnock; Livingston; Motherwell; **Rangers**; **St Johnstone**; **St Mirren**	Ayr United; **Inverness Caledonian Thistle**	Clyde; Falkirk	BSC Glasgow

Following on from a campaign in England's FA Cup, all matches kicked-off one minute later than originally scheduled to raise awareness and encourage supporters to talk about their mental health.

=== Matches ===
8 February 2020	Hamilton Academical	**1–4**	**Rangers**	Hamilton
12:31	Smith 38'		Arfield 25', 90'; Aribo 68'; Morelos 85'	Stadium: New Douglas Park; Attendance: 4,050; Referee: Alan Muir

8 February 2020	**Inverness Caledonian Thistle**	**1–0**	Livingston	Inverness
15:01	Welsh 61'			Stadium: Caledonian Stadium; Attendance: 1,512; Referee: Don Robertson

8 February 2020	St Mirren	**1–1**	Motherwell	Paisley
15:01	Jakubiak 74'		O'Hara 21'	Stadium: St Mirren Park; Attendance: 4,323; Referee: Andrew Dallas

8 February 2020	Ayr United	**1–2**	**St Johnstone**	Ayr
15:01	Drinan 4'		Muirhead 18' (o.g); Hendry 27'	Stadium: Somerset Park; Attendance: 2,625; Referee: Steven McLean

8 February 2020	Aberdeen	**0–0**	Kilmarnock	Aberdeen
15:01				Stadium: Pittodrie Stadium; Attendance: 9,430; Referee: Nick Walsh

8 February 2020	Falkirk	**0–1**	**Heart of Midlothian**	Falkirk
19:21			Clare 50' (pen.)	Stadium: Falkirk Stadium; Attendance: 5,976; Referee: John Beaton

9 February 2020	BSC Glasgow	**1–4**	**Hibernian**	Alloa
12:01	Smith 38'		McNulty 11', 30', 69'; Docherty 85'	Stadium: Recreation Park; Attendance: 2,120; Referee: Alan Newlands

9 February 2020	Clyde	**0–3**	**Celtic**	Cumbernauld
14:01			Ntcham 16'; Brown 40'; Bayo 90'	Stadium: Broadwood Stadium; Referee: Bobby Madden

=== Replays ===
18 February 2020	Motherwell	**4–4** (a.e.t.) (**2–3** p)	**St Mirren**	Motherwell
19:45	Polworth 27'; Watt 57'; Aarons 73'; Campbell 74'		Obika 14', 31'; Hartley 33' (o.g.); Foley 43'	Stadium: Fir Park; Attendance: 4,534; Referee: Gavin Duncan
	**Penalties**
	Donnelly (penalty missed); Watt (penalty missed); Aarons (penalty scored); Polworth (penalty scored); Hylton (penalty missed)		(penalty scored) McGrath; (penalty missed) Andreu; (penalty missed) MacPherson; (penalty scored) McAllister; (penalty scored) Obika

19 February 2020	Kilmarnock	**3–4** (a.e.t.)	**Aberdeen**	Kilmarnock
19:45	El Makrini 43'; Brophy 98'; Kabamba 116'		Considine 88'; Kennedy 91'; Cosgrove 119' (pen.); Johnson 120+1' (o.g.)	Stadium: Rugby Park; Attendance: 5,658; Referee: Nick Walsh

== Quarter-finals ==
The quarter-finals were scheduled to take place over the weekend of 29 February 2020.

=== Draw ===
The draw for the quarter-finals took place on Sunday 9 February 2020 following the Clyde-Celtic match live on Premier Sports 1. The draw was also live on the Premier Sports Facebook and Twitter pages and the Scottish Cup Facebook and Twitter pages and the BBC Sport website.

Teams in Italics were unknown at the time of the draw.

Teams in Bold advanced to the semi-finals.

Premiership	Championship
**Aberdeen**; **Celtic**; **Heart of Midlothian**; **Hibernian**; Rangers; St Johnstone; St Mirren	Inverness Caledonian Thistle

=== Matches ===
28 February 2020	**Hibernian**	**5–2**	Inverness Caledonian Thistle	Edinburgh
19:45	Jackson 38'; Allan 58'; Docherty 71'; Oméonga 81'; Gullan 84'		Tremarco 73'; Todorov 88'	Stadium: Easter Road; Attendance: 9,937; Referee: Nick Walsh

29 February 2020	**Heart of Midlothian**	**1–0**	Rangers	Edinburgh
17:30	Bozanic 58'			Stadium: Tynecastle Park; Attendance: 11,428; Referee: Steven McLean

29 February 2020	St Mirren	**0–2**	**Aberdeen**	Paisley
19:20			Ferguson 7'; Cosgrove 90' (pen.)	Stadium: St Mirren Park; Attendance: 4,479; Referee: Don Robertson

1 March 2020	St Johnstone	**0–1**	**Celtic**	Perth
15:00			Christie 81'	Stadium: McDiarmid Park; Attendance: 8,181; Referee: Bobby Madden

== Semi-finals ==
The semi-finals were originally scheduled to take place at Hampden Park over the weekend of 11 April 2020 but were postponed due to the COVID-19 pandemic.

=== Draw ===
The draw for the semi-finals took place on Sunday 1 March 2020 following the St Johnstone-Celtic match live on Premier Sports 1. The draw was also live on the Scottish Cup Twitter page.

Premiership
- Aberdeen
- Celtic
- Heart of Midlothian
- Hibernian

31 October 2020	Heart of Midlothian	2–1 (a.e.t.)	Hibernian	Glasgow
17:00	Wighton 60'; Boyce 111' (pen.)	Report	Doidge 67'	Stadium: Hampden Park; Attendance: 0 Referee: Willie Collum

1 November 2020	Celtic	2–0	Aberdeen	Glasgow
14:30	Christie 18'; Elyounoussi 23'	Report		Stadium: Hampden Park; Attendance: 0 Referee: Don Robertson

== Final ==
The final was originally scheduled to be played on 9 May 2020 at Hampden Park in Glasgow, but was postponed due to the coronavirus pandemic. On 21 July, it was rescheduled for 20 December.

20 December 2020
14:15

Celtic	3–3 (a.e.t.)	Heart of Midlothian
Christie 19'; Édouard 29' (pen.); Griffiths 105'	Report	Boyce 48'; Kingsley 67'; Ginnelly 111'
Penalties
Griffiths (penalty scored); McGregor (penalty scored); Christie (penalty missed); Johnston (penalty scored); Ajer (penalty scored)	4–3	(penalty scored) Naismith; (penalty scored) Smith; (penalty scored) Lee; (penalty missed) Kingsley; (penalty missed) Wighton

Hampden Park, Glasgow
Attendance: 0
Referee: John Beaton

== Broadcasting ==
The Scottish Cup is broadcast by Premier Sports and BBC Scotland. Premier Sports has the first 2 picks of Round 4 and Round 5, the quarter-finals as well as first pick of one semi-final and will air the final non-exclusively. BBC Scotland will broadcast one match per round from the first to third rounds and two matches per round from the fourth round to the quarter-finals, as well as one semi-final and the final.

The following matches are to be broadcast live on UK television:

Round	BBC Scotland	Premier Sports
First round	Kelty Hearts v Auchinleck Talbot	
Second round	Bonnyrigg Rose Athletic v Buckie Thistle	
Third round	Linlithgow Rose v Falkirk	
Fourth round	Dundee v Motherwell; Dundee United v Hibernian	Rangers v Stranraer; Partick Thistle v Celtic
Fifth round	BSC Glasgow v Hibernian; Falkirk v Heart of Midlothian	Hamilton Academical v Rangers; Clyde v Celtic
Quarter-finals	Hibernian v Inverness Caledonian Thistle; St Mirren v Aberdeen	Heart of Midlothian v Rangers; St Johnstone v Celtic
Semi-finals	Heart of Midlothian v Hibernian	Heart of Midlothian v Hibernian; Celtic v Aberdeen
Final	Celtic v Heart of Midlothian	
