= KUFC =

KUFC may refer to:

- Kabul United F.C.
- Karachi United Football Club
- Kelso United F.C.
- Kokushikan University F.C.
- Kelantan United F.C.
