= 2014–15 Lowland Football League =

Lowland League
- Season: 2014–15
- Champions: Edinburgh City
- Matches: 182
- Goals: 665 (3.65 per match)
- Top goalscorer: Aaron Somerville (Whitehill Welfare) (23 goals)
- Biggest home win: Selkirk 7-0 Gala FR (6 September 2014); East Kilbride 7-0 Preston Athletic (10 January 2015); Stirling University 7-0 Threave Rovers (11 January 2015)
- Biggest away win: Selkirk 1–9 Gretna 2008 (20 December 2014)
- Longest unbeaten run: 20 matches: Edinburgh City

The 2014–15 Lowland League was the second season of the Lowland Football League, the fifth tier of the Scottish football pyramid system. The season began on 2 August 2014 and ended on 13 May 2015. The Spartans were the defending champions. The league expanded to 14 teams with Edinburgh University and BSC Glasgow joining.

This was the first season in which promotion to Scottish League Two was introduced, with the champions taking part in the pyramid play-off against the Highland League champions and the winner then playing the bottom side in League Two.

Edinburgh City won their first league title on 20 March 2015 after nearest rivals Whitehill Welfare lost at East Kilbride. As a result, they faced the winners of the 2014–15 Highland Football League (Brora Rangers) in the semi-finals of the League Two play-offs, losing on penalties after drawing 2–2 on aggregate and therefore remained in the Lowland League.

== Teams ==
Location of teams in 2014–15 Scottish Lowland Football League

The following teams changed division prior to the 2014–15 season.

=== To Lowland League ===
- BSC Glasgow

Transferred from East of Scotland League Premier Division

- Edinburgh University

=== Stadia and Locations ===
Team	Location	Home ground	Capacity	Ref.
BSC Glasgow	Glasgow	Lochburn Park	3,500	
Dalbeattie Star	Dalbeattie	Islecroft Stadium	3,500	
East Kilbride	East Kilbride	K Park Training Academy	400	
Edinburgh City	Edinburgh	Meadowbank Stadium	16,500	
Edinburgh University	Edinburgh	New East Peffermill	TBC	
Gala Fairydean Rovers	Galashiels	Netherdale	4,000	
Gretna 2008	Gretna	Raydale Park	2,200	
Preston Athletic	Prestonpans	Pennypit Park	4,000	
Selkirk	Selkirk	Yarrow Park	1,162	
The Spartans	Edinburgh	Ainslie Park	3,000	
Stirling University	Stirling	Forthbank Stadium	3,808	
Threave Rovers	Castle Douglas	Meadow Park	1,500	
Vale of Leithen	Innerleithen	Victoria Park	1,500	
Whitehill Welfare	Rosewell	Ferguson Park	2,614	

== League table ==
Pos	Team	Pld	W	D	L	GF	GA	GD	Pts	Promotion or qualification
1	Edinburgh City (C)	26	22	3	1	65	14	+51	69	Qualification to League Two play-off semi-finals
2	East Kilbride	26	15	5	6	63	25	+38	50	
3	Gretna 2008	26	13	6	7	62	32	+30	45	
4	Dalbeattie Star	26	11	9	6	51	39	+12	42	
5	The Spartans	26	11	9	6	45	34	+11	42	
6	Stirling University	26	12	6	8	46	38	+8	42	
7	Whitehill Welfare	26	11	7	8	57	38	+19	40	
8	Gala Fairydean Rovers	26	9	7	10	48	54	−6	34	
9	Vale of Leithen	26	9	6	11	39	53	−14	33	
10	BSC Glasgow	26	7	9	10	39	52	−13	30	
11	Edinburgh University	26	8	4	14	40	52	−12	28	
12	Selkirk	26	6	5	15	53	74	−21	23	
13	Preston Athletic	26	3	5	18	31	75	−44	14	
14	Threave Rovers	26	2	5	19	21	80	−59	11	

Source: SLFL Soccerway
Rules for classification: 1) Points; 2) Goal difference; 3) Number of goals scored
(C) Champions

== Results ==
Home \ Away	BSC	DBS	EKB	EDC	EDU	GFR	G08	PRA	SEL	SPA	SLU	THR	VOL	WHW
BSC Glasgow		4–4	1–0	0–1	1–1	1–1	2–2	3–1	3–2	1–4	2–3	5–0	0–1	1–1
Dalbeattie Star	5–1		0–0	2–1	2–0	0–1	2–2	6–0	4–4	0–2	3–1	0–0	2–2	2–2
East Kilbride	4–0	1–3		0–1	3–1	3–0	2–3	7–0	6–0	1–1	4–0	5–1	3–0	1–0
Edinburgh City	3–0	2–0	3–2		1–0	1–0	0–0	7–1	3–0	2–0	3–1	4–0	3–1	0–0
Edinburgh University	0–2	2–4	0–3	0–1		2–3	0–3	2–0	3–1	2–2	1–1	3–1	3–1	3–1
Gala Fairydean Rovers	2–2	5–1	1–1	3–6	4–0		0–4	1–1	2–2	1–2	1–2	5–1	2–2	3–3
Gretna 2008	6–0	2–0	0–1	0–2	2–0	3–1		6–0	2–2	2–0	1–1	2–3	4–1	0–4
Preston Athletic	0–0	1–2	2–4	1–5	1–5	0–1	0–2		2–4	1–2	0–2	6–0	1–3	2–4
Selkirk	2–3	0–2	1–2	1–5	4–5	7–0	1–9	2–2		1–1	2–1	3–0	3–5	2–3
The Spartans	0–3	1–1	2–2	1–2	1–1	3–0	2–1	0–2	5–1		2–1	2–1	2–0	1–3
Stirling University	1–1	1–1	1–2	1–1	2–1	2–1	3–1	3–1	0–3	2–2		7–0	1–3	2–1
Threave Rovers	1–1	1–3	0–4	0–3	2–3	2–3	1–2	2–2	3–0	0–4	0–2		1–1	1–3
Vale of Leithen	3–1	2–0	1–1	0–3	3–2	1–4	3–2	0–2	1–4	1–1	0–3	0–0		0–3
Whitehill Welfare	4–1	1–2	3–1	0–2	3–0	2–3	1–1	2–2	6–2	2–2	1–2	6–0	2–4	

Source: BBC Sport
Legend: Blue = home team win; Yellow = draw; Red = away team win.

== Lowland League play-off ==
It was proposed that the winners of the 2014–15 East of Scotland Football League and 2014–15 South of Scotland Football League would play each another for a place in the Lowland League. However, this is subject to strict licensing and entry criteria which determined possible acceptance. As the play-off was not contested, Threave Rovers stayed in the division despite having finished bottom.
