= 2014–15 Scottish League Two =

Scottish League Two
- Season: 2014–15
- Champions: Albion Rovers
- Promoted: Albion Rovers
- Matches: 180
- Biggest home win: Berwick Rangers 5–0 East Stirlingshire (23 August 2014); Arbroath 5–0 Berwick Rangers (2 May 2015)
- Biggest away win: Montrose 0–4 East Fife (27 September 2014); Montrose 1–5 Arbroath (25 October 2014); Elgin City 0–4 Albion Rovers (28 October 2014); East Fife 1–5 Arbroath (27 December 2014); East Stirlingshire 0–4 Berwick Rangers (18 April 2015); East Stirlingshire 1–5 Albion Rovers (2 May 2015)
- Highest scoring: Elgin City 4–5 Annan Athletic (25 April 2015)

The 2014–15 Scottish League Two is the 21st season in the current format of 10 teams in the fourth tier of Scottish football. The last placed team entered play-off with the winners of the Highland League (Brora Rangers) and Lowland League (Edinburgh City) to determine which team entered League Two in the 2015–16 season.

== Teams ==
=== Stadia and locations ===
Location of teams in 2014–15 Scottish League Two

Team	Location	Stadium	Capacity
Albion Rovers	Coatbridge	Cliftonhill	1,238
Annan Athletic	Annan	Galabank	2,504
Arbroath	Arbroath	Gayfield Park	6,600
Berwick Rangers	Berwick-upon-Tweed	Shielfield Park	4,099
Clyde	Cumbernauld	Broadwood Stadium	8,086
East Fife	Methil	Bayview Stadium	1,980
East Stirlingshire	Stenhousemuir	Ochilview Park	7,937
Elgin City	Elgin	Borough Briggs	4,520
Montrose	Montrose	Links Park	4,936
Queen's Park	Glasgow	Hampden Park	51,866

=== Personnel ===
Team	Manager
Albion Rovers	(Scotland) Darren Young
Annan Athletic	(Scotland) Jim Chapman
Arbroath	(Scotland) Todd Lumsden
Berwick Rangers	(Scotland) Colin Cameron
Clyde	(Scotland) Barry Ferguson
East Fife	(Scotland) Gary Naysmith
East Stirlingshire	(Scotland) Craig Tully
Elgin City	(Scotland) Jim Weir
Montrose	(Scotland) George Shields
Queen's Park	(Scotland) Gus MacPherson

== League table ==
Pos	Team	Pld	W	D	L	GF	GA	GD	Pts	Promotion or relegation
1	Albion Rovers (C, P)	36	22	5	9	61	33	+28	71	Promotion to League One
2	Queen's Park	36	17	10	9	51	34	+17	61	Qualification for the League One play-offs
3	Arbroath	36	16	8	12	65	46	+19	56	Qualification for the League One play-offs
4	East Fife	36	15	8	13	56	48	+8	53	Qualification for the League One play-offs
5	Annan Athletic	36	14	8	14	56	56	0	50	
6	Clyde	36	13	8	15	40	50	−10	47	
7	Elgin City	36	12	9	15	55	58	−3	45	
8	Berwick Rangers	36	11	10	15	60	57	+3	43	
9	East Stirlingshire	36	13	4	19	40	66	−26	43	
10	Montrose (O)	36	9	6	21	42	78	−36	33	Qualification for the League Two play-off final

Source: SPFL
Rules for classification: 1) points; 2) goal difference; 3) number of goals scored.
(C) Champions; (O) Play-off winners; (P) Promoted

== Results ==
=== First half of season ===
Home \ Away	ALB	ANN	ARB	BER	CLY	EFI	EST	ELG	MON	QPA
Albion Rovers		2–1	2–1	2–1	2–2	2–0	1–2	3–0	0–0	1–0
Annan Athletic	2–1		0–1	2–0	2–1	2–1	4–3	3–3	2–2	0–1
Arbroath	1–0	3–2		2–0	4–0	0–2	4–0	1–0	3–1	1–2
Berwick Rangers	1–1	2–0	1–2		4–0	2–3	5–0	1–1	2–2	0–0
Clyde	0–1	1–1	2–5	3–3		3–1	0–1	2–1	1–2	0–2
East Fife	0–0	1–1	1–5	2–3	0–1		3–1	1–1	3–0	2–2
East Stirlingshire	1–4	0–1	2–3	0–2	1–0	1–1		2–1	4–0	1–3
Elgin City	0–4	0–0	1–1	2–0	1–0	1–0	0–1		0–1	1–4
Montrose	0–2	2–0	1–5	2–1	0–3	0–4	4–1	2–3		1–2
Queen's Park	0–1	0–0	0–2	2–0	1–2	3–0	3–0	2–1	2–0	

Updated to match(es) played on 29 December 2014. Source: BBC Sport
Legend: Blue = home team win; Yellow = draw; Red = away team win.

=== Second half of season ===
Home \ Away	ALB	ANN	ARB	BER	CLY	EFI	EST	ELG	MON	QPA
Albion Rovers		2–0	1–1	2–0	0–2	2–3	0–1	0–3	3–0	2–1
Annan Athletic	1–3		2–0	4–2	0–1	2–1	3–2	2–3	4–3	2–0
Arbroath	0–2	1–1		5–0	3–1	1–1	0–1	3–3	2–2	1–1
Berwick Rangers	0–2	2–2	3–1		0–0	0–3	3–0	0–2	3–3	1–1
Clyde	2–3	1–0	1–1	0–3		1–0	1–1	0–2	2–0	2–0
East Fife	1–0	2–1	2–0	1–4	1–1		2–1	3–1	3–0	0–0
East Stirlingshire	1–5	1–3	1–0	0–4	1–2	2–0		1–0	0–1	3–1
Elgin City	2–0	4–5	2–1	2–1	2–0	3–5	1–2		4–0	1–2
Montrose	3–4	2–1	3–0	0–2	0–1	0–3	0–1	2–1		2–2
Queen's Park	0–1	2–0	2–1	2–1	1–1	1–0	1–1	1–1	4–1	

Updated to match(es) played on 25 April 2015. Source: BBC Sport
Legend: Blue = home team win; Yellow = draw; Red = away team win.

== League Two play-offs ==
The semi-final was contested by the winners of the Highland League (Brora Rangers) and Lowland League (Edinburgh City). The winning club then played off against the bottom club in League Two, which was Montrose, to decide the club taking a place in League Two for the 2015–16 season. Had Montrose lost their League Two status, they would have dropped down to the next season's Highland League.

=== Semi-final ===
==== First leg ====
25 April 2015	Edinburgh City	1–1	Brora Rangers	Meadowbank Stadium, Edinburgh
15:00	Deniran 58'	BBC Report	MacLean 79'	Attendance: 908; Referee: David Munro

==== Second leg ====
2 May 2015	Brora Rangers	1–1 (a.e.t.) (2–2 agg.) (4–2 p)	Edinburgh City	Dudgeon Park, Brora
15:00	Graham 63'	Report	Allum 4'
	Penalties
	Maclean (penalty scored); Mackay (penalty scored); McKeown (penalty missed); Morrison (penalty scored); Kettlewell (penalty scored)		Harrison (penalty missed) (penalty scored) (penalty scored); Mbu (penalty missed)

=== Final ===
==== First leg ====
9 May 2015	Brora Rangers	1–0	Montrose	Dudgeon Park, Brora
15:00	Andrews 38' (o.g.)	SPFL Report		Attendance: 525

==== Second leg ====
16 May 2015	Montrose	3–1 (3–2 agg.)	Brora Rangers	Links Park, Montrose
15:00	Johnston 37'; Andrews 76'; Wood 77'	Report	Maclean 47'; Mackay (yellow card) 31' (yellow-red card) 49'	Attendance: 2,132; Referee: John McKendrick
