= Scottish Welfare Football Association =

Amateur sports association

- Founded: 1918
- Headquarters: Hampden Park, Glasgow
- President: Steven Aitken

The Scottish Welfare Football Association (SWFA) is an affiliated association of the Scottish Football Association. It was formed at the end of the First World War to boost morale among factory workers. Historically, over 500 clubs competed in Welfare competitions; however, this has dwindled over the years to fewer than 200 currently. The association oversees competitions mainly operating Sunday and summer or midweek football, predominantly in the North of Scotland.
