= East of Scotland Football League =

Association football league in Scotland

- Founded: 1923
- Country: Scotland (57 teams)
- Other club from: England (1 team)
- Confederation: UEFA
- Divisions: 4
- Number of clubs: 59
- Level on pyramid: 6–8
- Promotion to: Lowland Football League
- Domestic cup(s): Scottish Cup (SFA licensed clubs and Premier Division winners); South Region Challenge Cup
- League cup(s): East of Scotland League Cup; King Cup (non-Premier Division clubs only)
- Current champions: Hill of Beath Hawthorn (1st title) (2025–26)
- Most championships: Whitehill Welfare (16 titles)
- Website: eosfl.com
- Current: 2026–27 East of Scotland Football League

The East of Scotland Football League (EoSFL) is a senior football league based in the east and south-east of Scotland. The league sits at levels 6–9 on the Scottish football league system, acting as a feeder to the Lowland Football League.

Founded in 1923, it is currently composed of 59 member clubs competing in four divisions. Traditionally clubs were located in Edinburgh, Lothians and the Scottish Borders however in the 2010s the league expanded north and now also includes clubs from Clackmannanshire, Falkirk, Fife, Stirling, and Perth.

Since 2014–15 it has featured in the senior pyramid system. The winners take part in an end of season promotion play-off with the South of Scotland Football League and West of Scotland Football League champions, subject to clubs meeting the required licensing criteria.

== History ==
=== Original EoSFL ===
An earlier East of Scotland League existed between 1896 and 1906, when the supplementary Edinburgh Football League changed its name, after accepting Dundee as a member. There is no connection between the two incarnations of the league.

=== Eastern League, 1921–22 ===
The forerunner of the EOSL was the amateur Eastern League, one of two such leagues this season that had the name, the other being professional and based in the North-East of Scotland. The membership would include subsequent EOSL members; Gala Fairydean, Peebles Rovers, Vale of Leithen, Edinburgh Civil Service, Selkirk and Civil Service Strollers. Gala were league champions with 17 points from their 10 matches.

=== 21st century ===
The EoSFL was traditionally one of Scotland's three "senior" non-leagues which sat outside the Scottish Football League (SFL), the other two being the Highland Football League and the South of Scotland Football League (SoSFL). It was generally viewed as being weaker than the Highland League (with fewer of their club sides defeating SFL sides in the Scottish Cup competition as opposed to the HFL), but was still regarded as being stronger than the South of Scotland League.

Some SoSFL clubs opted to join the EoSFL, including Annan Athletic before they were elected to the SFL in 2008. Dalbeattie Star and Threave Rovers also joined however both subsequently left to rejoin the SoSFL and then later the Lowland League.

A number of the sides in the EoSFL applied to join the SFL in the past when vacancies arose. Annan Athletic were successful in 2008 (after a previous application in 2000), while Edinburgh City (2002, 2008), Gala Fairydean (1994, 2000, 2002), Preston Athletic (2000, 2002, 2008), and The Spartans (2008) were unsuccessful.

In 2004, Threave Rovers pulled out of the league to concentrate their efforts on the South of Scotland Football League. This left the league with an uneven number of clubs, and they were expected to fill the vacancy in the summer of 2005, with Gala Rovers widely touted as likely candidates. However, this did not happen. The only change that happened at that year's AGM of the league, was that Tollcross United announced that they would be competing as Tynecastle from the 2005–06 season.

In 2006, Peebles Rovers merged with several local amateur sides to become Peebles, who took Rovers' place in the league. At the 2007 AGM, agreement was reached to admit the reserve side of Berwick Rangers as the twelfth member of the First Division. They also entered the League Cup, but no other cups during the 2007–08 season. However, the reserves lasted only one season following Berwick Rangers' relegation to the fourth tier of Scottish football. They were replaced by Stirling University, but returned for the 2010–11 season.

Gretna 2008 entered the league in 2008, formed in the wake of the financial disaster that befell Gretna's former club, Gretna F.C. They initially had to play home matches in the nearby town of Annan, the club that took their place in the SFL.

The admission of Duns prior to the 2011–12 season, and then Burntisland Shipyard in 2012–13 brought the number of sides in the EoSFL to 26, the highest it had ever been up to that point.

=== Lowland League and decline ===
In 2013, the Lowland Football League was formed to act as a direct feeder to the Scottish Professional Football League (SPFL), covering an area of Scotland south of the Tay Road Bridge. Nine EoSFL clubs gained entry to the Lowland League, reducing the EoSFL to 20 teams. Hibernian entered a reserve team into the league at the start of the 2013–14 season, but withdrew after one season due to their first team being relegated. Further departures saw the league merged into a single division of 16 teams in 2015–16, which was then reduced to just 11 teams during 2016–17 as more clubs moved to the Lowland League, back to the Juniors or resigned.

=== Influx of Junior clubs ===
Beginning in 2017 the league experienced a resurgence with SJFA East Superleague champions Kelty Hearts joining from the Juniors. In April 2018, thirteen clubs — most of them from the East Juniors — were accepted into the league for the 2018–19 season, doubling the league's membership. When the window for applications was extended to the league's AGM in June, even more clubs quit the Junior grade, bringing the total membership up to 39 clubs, split over three conferences. The following season Glenrothes made the same switch. In 2020 a further ten clubs, including the return of Eyemouth United after a year out, boosted the league's membership to 49 clubs ahead of the 2020–21 season. All of the remaining East Region junior clubs south of Tayport (most from West Lothian) joined the league for 2021–22, giving the league a total of 59 members.

== East of Scotland Football Association ==
While the EoSFL oversees the leagues and League Cup competitions; the East of Scotland Football Association (EoSFA) is a technically independent body, which organises all of the other cups. It was founded in 1875 as the "Eastern Branch of the Scottish FA", a title that was vetoed by the Scottish FA. Taking the title Edinburgh FA, it was renamed the East of Scotland FA in 1889. Most of the officials sit on both bodies, and the Executive Committee is a joint organisation. The current President of the EoSFA is Andy McDonald (of Edinburgh City), while the President of the EoSFL is John Greenhorn (of Ormiston).

There are 71 members of the East of Scotland Football Association (EoSFA).

- Five members play in the SPFL:
  - Edinburgh City (Scottish League Two)
  - Heart of Midlothian (Scottish Premiership)
  - Hibernian (Scottish Premiership)
  - Kelty Hearts (Scottish League Two)
  - The Spartans (Scottish League Two)
- 9 members play in the Lowland League:
  - Berwick Rangers, Bo'ness United, Bonnyrigg Rose Athletic, Broxburn Athletic, Civil Service Strollers, Gala Fairydean Rovers, Linlithgow Rose, Tranent Juniors, and University of Stirling.

The first teams of the members in the SPFL have little involvement in EoSFA competitions. Youth teams of Hearts and Hibernian formerly contested the East of Scotland Shield, while Bonnyrigg Rose, Edinburgh City, Kelty Hearts and The Spartans participate in the East of Scotland (City) Cup. Berwick Rangers, Hibernian, and The Spartans have all previously fielded reserve teams in the EoSFL.

The EoSFL and EoSFA are full members of the Scottish Football Association.

== Member clubs ==
Location of teams in 2024–25 East of Scotland Football League
– Premier Division
– First Division
– Second Division
– Third Division

The EoSFL's two-tier format, which began in 1987–88, was abolished for the 2015–16 season due to dwindling numbers, and replaced with a single division. To cope with the influx of new members in 2018–19, the league consisted of three conferences running in parallel. For 2019–20, the EoSFL was reorganised back into a two-tier setup, with a 16-team Premier Division and two First Division conferences. Due to the COVID-19 pandemic, there was no relegation in 2020; so the Premier Division was temporarily increased to 18 clubs. It reverted back to 16 clubs following the 2021–22 season while the top 7 in the two First Division conferences formed a First and Second Division, with Conference X being renamed the Third Division.

Listed below are the 59 clubs in the EoSFL for the 2024–25 season. Since 2022–23 the EoSFL setup has featured Premier, First, Second, and Third Divisions, with three clubs promoted and relegated between each division.

=== Premier Division ===
- Armadale Thistle
- Blackburn United
- Camelon Juniors
- Dunbar United
- Dundonald Bluebell
- Edinburgh South
- Edinburgh University
- Haddington Athletic
- Jeanfield Swifts
- Newtongrange Star
- Penicuik Athletic
- Preston Athletic
- Sauchie Juniors
- St Andrews United
- Thornton Hibs
- Whitburn

=== First Division ===
- Bathgate Thistle
- Coldstream
- Crossgates Primrose
- Easthouses Lily Miners Welfare
- Glenrothes
- Heriot-Watt University
- Kennoway Star Hearts
- Kinnoull
- Kirkcaldy & Dysart
- Leith Athletic
- Lochgelly Albert
- Lochore Welfare
- Lothian Thistle Hutchison Vale
- Oakley United
- West Calder United
- Whitehill Welfare

=== Second Division Conference SE ===
- Arniston Rangers
- Dalkeith Thistle
- Edinburgh College
- Edinburgh Community
- Edinburgh United
- Hawick Royal Albert
- Linton Hotspur
- Ormiston Primrose
- (England) Tweedmouth Rangers
- Tynecastle
- Vale of Leithen

=== Second Division Conference NW ===
- Burntisland Shipyard
- Cowdenbeath Central
- Fauldhouse United
- Harthill Royal
- Inverkeithing Hillfield Swifts
- Livingston Community
- Livingston United
- Luncarty
- Newburgh
- Pumpherston
- Stirling University Reserves
- Stoneyburn

== Cup competitions ==
=== Current ===
- Scottish Cup (sponsored by Scottish Gas): For clubs with an SFA licence and the Premier Division winners, who all enter at the preliminary round stage. Knock-out tournament without no replays.
- SFA South Region Challenge Cup: Introduced in 2007–08 as a replacement for the Scottish Qualifying Cup (South) which was abolished under the new Scottish Cup format. It is for all senior non-league clubs in the south of Scotland and has 163 entrants for the 2023–24 season – 16 from the Lowland League, 56 from the EoSFL, 11 from the SoSFL, and 80 from the WoSFL. Reserve teams do not take part.
- East of Scotland League Cup: All 59 EoSFL teams enter this competition. Straight knock-out tournament without replays. Between 2011–12 and 2018–19, only the group winners and runners-up from the Qualifying Leagues competed in this tournament.
- King Cup: Open to the 42 clubs below the Premier Division but originally for all members of the EOSFA. Straight knock-out tournament without replays. The King Cup final is traditionally the last game of the season.
- Alex Jack Cup (also formerly known as the East of Scotland Consolation Cup): Competition for the 28 EoSFL clubs who are not already competing in the Scottish Cup or Scottish Junior Cup, usually played on the same weekends as Scottish Cup matches. Straight knock-out tournament, without replays. The winner goes on to play in the East, South and West of Scotland Cup-Winners Shield against the Southern Counties FA's Alba Cup winner and the West's Strathclyde Cup winner for a place in the following season's Scottish Cup.
- East of Scotland Qualifying Cup: Competition for the 66 EoSFA members outwith the SPFL. Straight knock-out tournament without replays. The competition was originally the preliminary phase of the EOS Shield.
- East of Scotland (City) Cup: The winner of the East of Scotland Qualifying Cup joins the EoSFA members playing in SPFL in the semi-finals. The four EoSFA members in the national leagues (Hearts, Hibernian, Livingston, and formerly Berwick Rangers) used to all enter, but now the Hearts and Hibernian reserve teams contest the East of Scotland Shield – albeit intermittently.

=== Inactive ===
- East of Scotland Shield: since the mid-1980s, this tournament has become a one-off match for youth/reserve teams of Hearts and Hibernian, however it was last held in 2015–16.
- East of Scotland Qualifying Leagues: Removed for 2019–20 due to the increase in league fixtures. Added in 2011–12, this was a pre-season warm-up competition where clubs were split into ten groups and each played the others within their group once, with the group winners and runners-up progressing to the League Cup.

=== Holders ===
2024–25 winners unless stated.

- South Region Challenge Cup: East Kilbride (non-EoSFL club)
- East of Scotland League Cup: Musselburgh Athletic
- Alex Jack Cup: Whitburn
- Cup Winners Shield: Whitburn
- King Cup: Bo'ness Athletic
- East of Scotland Qualifying Cup: Linlithgow Rose
- East of Scotland (City) Cup: Kelty Hearts (non-EoSFL club) (2023–24)

== Seasons ==
Season	East of Scotland League				
1923–24	Coldstream				
1924–25	Vale of Leithen				
1925–26	Civil Service Strollers				
1926–27	Civil Service Strollers (2)				
1927–28	(England) Berwick Rangers				
1928–29	Peebles Rovers				
1929–30	Bathgate				
1930–31	Bathgate (2)				
1931–32	Penicuik Athletic				
1932–33	Peebles Rovers (2)				
1933–34	Peebles Rovers (3)				
1934–35	Peebles Rovers (4)				
1935–36	Peebles Rovers (5)				
1936–37	Jed Arts				
1937–38	Penicuik Athletic (2)				
1938–39	Bo'ness				
1939–40 to 1944–45	No league championship during World War II				
1945–46	Peebles Rovers (6); This edition of the league was known as the Emergency Trophy.				
1946–47	(England) Berwick Rangers (2)				
1947–48	Hibernian 'B'				
1948–49	Hibernian 'B' (2)				
1949–50	Heart of Midlothian 'B'				
1950–51	Hibernian 'B' (3)				
1951–52	Hibernian 'B' (4)				
1952–53	Hibernian 'B' (5)				
1953–54	unfinished				
1954–55	Eyemouth United				
1955–56	Eyemouth United (2)				
1956–57	Eyemouth United (3)				
1957–58	unfinished				
1958–59	unfinished				
1959–60	unfinished				
1960–61	unfinished				
1961–62	Gala Fairydean (1)				
1962–63	unfinished				
1963–64	Gala Fairydean (2)				
1964–65	Gala Fairydean (3)				
1965–66	Gala Fairydean (4)				
1966–67	Hawick Royal Albert				
1967–68	Hawick Royal Albert (2)				
1968–69	Gala Fairydean (5)				
1969–70	Cowdenbeath 'A'				
1970–71	Eyemouth United (4)				
1971–72	The Spartans				
1972–73	Civil Service Strollers (3)				
1973–74	Hawick Royal Albert (3)				
1974–75	Selkirk				
1975–76	Selkirk (2)				
1976–77	Selkirk (3)				
1977–78	Vale of Leithen (2)				
1978–79	Vale of Leithen (3)				
1979–80	Whitehill Welfare				
1980–81	Whitehill Welfare (2)				
1981–82	Whitehill Welfare (3)				
1982–83	Whitehill Welfare (4)				
1983–84	The Spartans (2)				
1984–85	Whitehill Welfare (5)				
1985–86	Whitehill Welfare (6)				
1986–87	Vale of Leithen (4)				
Season	Premier Division	First Division			League Cup
1987–88	Whitehill Welfare (7)	Annan Athletic			Whitehill Welfare (1)
1988–89	Gala Fairydean (6)	Peebles Rovers			Whitehill Welfare (2)
1989–90	Annan Athletic	Coldstream			Berwick Rangers 'A'
1990–91	Gala Fairydean (7)	Easthouses Lily Miners Welfare			Whitehill Welfare (3)
1991–92	Easthouses Lily Miners Welfare	Manor Thistle			Whitehill Welfare (4)
1992–93	Whitehill Welfare (8)	Civil Service Strollers			Edinburgh City
1993–94	Whitehill Welfare (9)	Tollcross United			Gala Fairydean
1994–95	Whitehill Welfare (10)	Pencaitland			Whitehill Welfare (5)
1995–96	Whitehill Welfare (11)	Edinburgh City			Whitehill Welfare (6)
1996–97	The Spartans (3)	Lothian Thistle			Whitehill Welfare (7)
1997–98	Whitehill Welfare (12)	Peebles Rovers (2)			Whitehill Welfare (8)
1998–99	Whitehill Welfare (13)	Easthouses Lily Miners Welfare (2)			Whitehill Welfare (9)
1999–2000	Annan Athletic (2)	Threave Rovers			Annan Athletic
2000–01	Annan Athletic (3)	Pencaitland & Ormiston			Civil Service Strollers
2001–02	The Spartans (4)	Preston Athletic			Edinburgh City (2)
2002–03	Whitehill Welfare (14)	Edinburgh University			Whitehill Welfare (10)
2003–04	The Spartans (5)	Kelso United			The Spartans
2004–05	The Spartans (6)	Easthouses Lily Miners Welfare (3)			The Spartans (2)
2005–06	Edinburgh City	Craigroyston			Heriot-Watt University
2006–07	Annan Athletic (4)	Dalbeattie Star			Whitehill Welfare (11)
2007–08	Whitehill Welfare (15)	Heriot-Watt University			Whitehill Welfare (12)
2008–09	The Spartans (7)	Tynecastle			Dalbeattie Star
2009–10	The Spartans (8)	Stirling University			The Spartans (3)
2010–11	The Spartans (9)	Gretna 2008			The Spartans (4)
2011–12	Stirling University	Heriot-Watt University (2)			Whitehill Welfare (13)
2012–13	Whitehill Welfare (16)	Craigroyston (2)			Edinburgh City (3)
2013–14	Lothian Thistle Hutchison Vale	Hibernian reserves			Hibernian reserves
2014–15	Lothian Thistle Hutchison Vale (2)	Peebles Rovers (3)			Leith Athletic
Season	East of Scotland League				League Cup
2015–16	Leith Athletic				The Spartans reserves
2016–17	Lothian Thistle Hutchison Vale (3)				Leith Athletic (2)
2017–18	Kelty Hearts *				Lothian Thistle Hutchison Vale
Season	Conferences				League Cup
2018–19	Championship play-off: Bonnyrigg Rose Athletic * Conference A: Penicuik Athletic; Conference B: Bonnyrigg Rose Athletic; Conference C: Broxburn Athletic				Bo'ness United
Season	Premier Division	First Division			League Cup
2019–20	Bo'ness United *	Conference A: Tynecastle; Conference B: Lothian Thistle Hutchison Vale			Unfinished
2020–21	Null and void	Conference A: Null and void Conference B: Null and void			No competition
Season	Premier Division	First Division	Conference X		League Cup
2021–22	Tranent Juniors *	Conference A: Haddington Athletic; Conference B: Oakley United	Whitburn		Linlithgow Rose
Season	Premier Division	First Division	Second Division	Third Division	League Cup
2022–23	Linlithgow Rose *	Dunbar United	Whitburn	Bo'ness Athletic	Bo'ness Athletic
2023–24	Broxburn Athletic *	Dunipace	Bo'ness Athletic	West Calder United	Sauchie Juniors
2024–25	Musselburgh Athletic	Camelon Juniors	Armadale Thistle	Lochgelly Albert	Musselburgh Athletic
2025–26	Hill of Beath Hawthorn *	Armadale Thistle	West Calder United	Hawick Royal Albert	Hill of Beath Hawthorn
Season	Premier Division	First Division	Second Division		League Cup
2026–27			Conference SE: Conference NW:		

* Team promoted to the Lowland League

== Total titles won ==
Clubs currently playing in the league are shown in bold. Clubs no longer active are shown in italics.

Rank	Club	East of Scotland League (pre 1987–88)	East of Scotland Premier Division (1987–88–present)	Total Titles
1	**Whitehill Welfare**	6	10	16
2	The Spartans	2	7	9
3	Gala Fairydean	5	2	7
4	**Peebles Rovers**	6	0	6
5	Hibernian 'B'	5	0	5
6=	Annan Athletic	0	4	4
6=	Eyemouth United	4	0	4
6=	**Vale of Leithen**	4	0	4
9=	Civil Service Strollers	3	0	3
9=	**Hawick Royal Albert**	3	0	3
9=	**Lothian Thistle Hutchison Vale**	0	3	3
9=	Selkirk	3	0	3
13=	Bathgate	2	0	2
13=	Berwick Rangers	2	0	2
13=	**Penicuik Athletic**	2	0	2
16=	Bonnyrigg Rose Athletic	0	1	1
16=	Bo'ness	1	0	1
16=	Bo'ness United	0	1	1
16=	Broxburn Athletic	0	1	1
16=	**Coldstream**	1	0	1
16=	Cowdenbeath 'A'	1	0	1
16=	**Easthouses Lily Miners Welfare**	0	1	1
16=	Edinburgh City	0	1	1
16=	Heart of Midlothian 'B'	1	0	1
16=	Jed Arts	1	0	1
16=	Kelty Hearts	0	1	1
16=	**Leith Athletic**	0	1	1
16=	Linlithgow Rose	0	1	1
16=	**Musselburgh Athletic**	0	1	1
16=	University of Stirling	0	1	1
16=	Tranent Juniors	0	1	1
