= Whitestone Park =

Sports ground in Peebles, Scotland

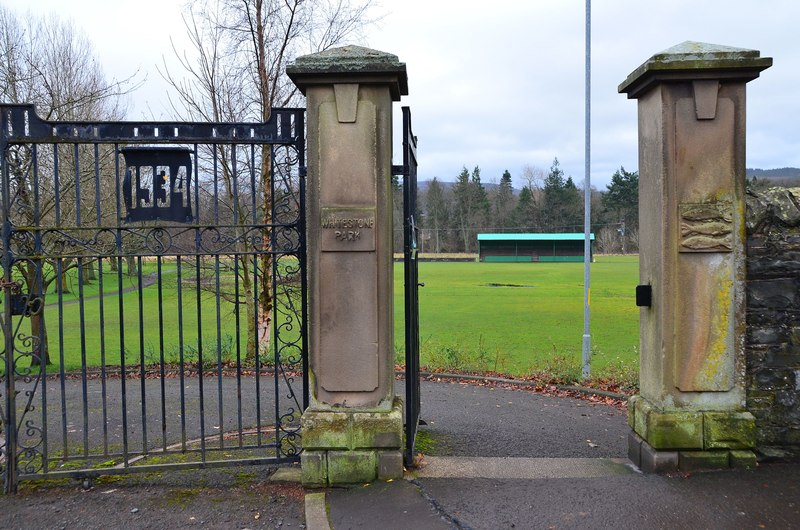
- Whitestone Park gates

- Location within Scottish Borders
- Location: Peebles, Scotland
- Coordinates: 55.6496°N 3.1810°W
- Capacity: 2,250
- Surface: Grass
- Record attendance: 1,500

Construction
- Opened: 1906

Tenants
- Peebles Rovers; Peebles County Cricket Club

Whitestone Park is a sports ground in Peebles, Scottish Borders, Scotland, used for football and cricket. It has been the home ground of Peebles Rovers F.C. since 1906, including when they were members of the Scottish Football League between 1923 and 1926. It is also used by Peebles County Cricket Club.

== History ==
Peebles Rovers moved to Whitestone Park in 1906. A grandstand was erected on the southern side of the pitch alongside terracing, whilst a pavilion and changing rooms were built at the western end of the pitch.

In 1923 Peebles Rovers were elected to the new Division Three of the Scottish Football League. The first SFL match at Whitestone Park was played on 18 August 1923, a 2–1 defeat by Mid-Annandale in front of 800 spectators. The ground's probable record attendance of 1,500 was set for a Scottish Cup first round replay against St Cuthbert Wanderers on 28 January 1925, with Peebles Rovers winning 5–0. At the end of the 1925–26 season the Third Division was disbanded, and Peebles Rovers' final home match in the SFL was played on 17 April 1926, a 4–1 defeat by Royal Albert.

The record attendance was equalled on 13 February 1954 when 1,500 watched a Scottish Cup second round match against Buckie Thistle, with the match ending in a 1–1 draw.

Whitestone Park is also used by Peebles County Cricket Club, with the cricket field partially overlapping the football pitch.
