= Lothian Thistle Hutchison Vale F.C. =

Association football club in Scotland

Hutchison Vale
- Full name: Hutchison Vale Football Club
- Nickname: Hutchie
- Founded: 1969; 57 years ago (as Lloyds & Scottish)
- Ground: Saughton Enclosure, Edinburgh
- Capacity: 1,000
- Coordinates: 55°56′2″N 3°15′16″W
- League: East of Scotland League First Division
- 2025–26: East of Scotland League Premier Division, 16th of 16 (relegated)
- Website: www.lthvfc.co.uk
Home colours	Away colours

Hutchison Vale Football Club are a senior non-league football club based in Edinburgh, Scotland. Currently competing in the East of Scotland League First Division, they play their home matches at Saughton Enclosure in the Saughton area of the city.

== History ==
Founded in 1969 as an amateur works team for Lloyds Finance, they initially played as Lloyds & Scottish prior to renaming themselves Lothian Thistle.

The club originally competed in the Lothian amateur league before a successful spell in the Caledonian Amateur Football League. They then moved up to senior status when they joined the East of Scotland Football League in 1995, gaining promotion to the Premier Division two years later in 1997.

The club is linked with the youth football club Hutchison Vale, and changed their name to Lothian Thistle Hutchison Vale before the start of the 2011–12 season to reflect this.

LTHV won the East of Scotland Premier Division title for the first time in the 2013–14 season, repeating this success in the 2014–15 season. They were runners-up in 2015–16 and won the league for the third time in 2016–17, although they did not take part in the play-off for promotion to the Lowland League because they were ineligible for licensing reasons. They narrowly lost out on the 2017–18 title after defeat to Kelty Hearts on the final day of the season.

The club reached the 3rd round of the Scottish Cup in 2017–18 beating League Two side Stirling Albion 5–3 away from home, before losing 1–7 at home to St Mirren. They became SFA members in 2018, allowing them automatic entry into the Scottish Cup.

LTHV gained promotion back to the Premier Division for 2020–21 after winning First Division Conference A in the curtailed 2019–20 season.

== Ground ==
The club operates at Saughton Enclosure in the west side of Edinburgh, where they have been since 1998. The ground can accommodate up to 1,000 spectators.

== Youth ==
The Hutchison Vale youth team was founded in 1940. Its first intake of players included future professionals Tommy Younger and George Farm.

A full list of 'graduates' was released by the BBC in April 2019 - Grant Brebner, Lee Bullen, Mark Burchill, Gary Caldwell, Steven Caldwell, John Collins, Alan Combe, Peter Cormack, Darren Dods, Andrew Driver, George Farm, Alfred Finnbogason, Darren Fletcher, Ryan Flynn, Paul Hanlon, Kevin Harper, John Hughes, Danny Galbraith, Gary Glen, Leigh Griffiths, John Inglis, Danny Lennon, Gary Locke, Gary Mason, Eddie May, Allan McGregor, Steven McLean, Marc McNulty, Michael McIndoe, Kenny Miller, Grant Murray, Ian Murray, Gary Naysmith, Sam Nicholson, Colin Nish, Garry O'Connor, Allan Preston, Derek Riordan, Scott Robinson, Michael Stewart, Danny Swanson, Paul Telfer, Kevin Thomson, Gregor Townsend, Steven Tweed, Mickey Weir, Steven Whittaker, Danny Wilson, Tommy Younger

In April 2019 it was described as "Scotland's most fruitful football academy".

== Women ==
Hutchison Vale also have a women's section who play in SWF Championship, the highest division of the SWF which sits below the Scottish Women's Premier League.

In 2018 they merged with Edinburgh University Ladies and were renamed Edinburgh University Hutchison Vale, playing their home games at the university's Peffermill Sports Ground, Edinburgh. However this partnership ended at the end of the season, and they reverted to the Hutchison Vale name for 2019.

Hutchison Vale Ladies won the Scottish Cup in 1993 & 1994.

== Honours ==
As Lothian Thistle prior to the 2011–12 season

- East of Scotland Football League
  - Winners (3): 2013–14, 2014–15, 2016–17
  - Runners-up (2): 2015–16, 2017–18
- East of Scotland Football League First Division
  - Winners: 1996–97, 2019–20 (Conference A)
- East of Scotland City Cup
  - Winners: 2016–17
  - Runners-up: 2014–15
- East of Scotland Qualifying Cup
  - Winners: 1996–97, 2014–15
  - Runners-up (2): 2016–17, 2017–18
- East of Scotland League Cup
  - Winners: 2017–18
- King Cup
- Winners: 2003–04
  - Runners-up (2): 2015–16, 2016–17
- Alex Jack Cup
  - Winners (5): 2000–01, 2003–04, 2005–06, 2007–08, 2016–17
  - Runners-up (6): 1995–96, 1997–98, 2002–03, 2010–11, 2013–14, 2016–17
- South & East Cup Winners Shield
  - Winners: 2016–17
