= Edinburgh University A.F.C. =

Association football club in Scotland

Edinburgh University
- Full name: Edinburgh University Association Football Club
- Nickname: The Uni
- Founded: 1878
- Ground: East Peffermill, Edinburgh
- Capacity: 1,100 (100 seated)
- Coordinates: 55°55′52″N 3°8′57″W
- Manager: Calum Elliot
- League: East of Scotland League Premier Division
- 2025–26: East of Scotland League First Division, 6th of 16 (promoted)
- Website: https://euafc.co.uk/
Home colours	Away colours

Edinburgh University Association Football Club are a football club representing the University of Edinburgh. Established in 1878, they are third oldest club in East of Scotland football and have been a member of the Scottish Football Association (SFA) since that year. Edinburgh University are eligible to compete in the Scottish Cup every season as they are full members of the SFA. The club's present home is at Peffermill, where it has played since its move from Canal Field in 1978.

== History ==
A group describing itself as "The Edinburgh University Foot Ball Club" played three matches in 1851. On the 25th of January, it played against the 93rd regiment, awarding medals to the winning team of the Regiment. No further activity by the club was documented for over a decade.

The Club won its first trophy, the Edinburgh Shield in 1883. Historically it is the most successful footballing university in Scotland. The club has won the Edinburgh Shield once, the Queen's Park Shield 26 times (including eight successive wins from 1973–74 to 1981–82), the East of Scotland Amateur Cup once, the Scottish Qualifying Cup (South) once, the East of Scotland Qualifying Cup three times, the British University Sports Association (BUSA) Cup once and the King Cup three times.

The most recent achievements of the club include winning the East of Scotland Qualifying Cup in 2005, and finishing in second position in the East of Scotland Premier Division in 2007–08. In October 2006, the side beat Vale of Leithen 3–0 to reach the first round proper of the Scottish Cup for the first time since 1972–73. In November 2006, they defeated Keith to proceed to the second round of the Scottish Cup for only the second time in the club's history, and 106 years after their first appearance at this stage. The team's 2006 cup run was halted by Cowdenbeath, who defeated the university 5–1 at Central Park on 9 December 2006. After the Scottish Qualifying Cup was abolished, Edinburgh University gained direct entry to the Scottish Cup as a full member of the SFA. Receiving a random bye in the first round, Edinburgh University beat Deveronvale in the second round before losing to Cove Rangers in the third round.

The club was admitted to the Lowland Football League for the 2014–15 season. Their best finishing position is 6th place in 2015–16.

Dorian Ogunro, a former Edinburgh University 1st XI player returned to coach the Under 21 Team after graduating and was the Uni's head coach from 2013 to 2023. In June 2023 Sean McAuley was appointed as head coach but he resigned after two full seasons in which the club suffered back-to-back relegations. Now in the East of Scotland First Division, the club appointed former Heart of Midlothian F.C. forward and former Bonnyrigg Rose manager Calum Elliot in June 2025.

== Season-by-season record ==
=== Lowland League ===
Season	Division	Tier	League						Scottish Cup
Season	Division	Tier	Finish	Played	Wins	Draws	Losses	Points	Scottish Cup
Edinburgh University A.F.C.
2014–15	Lowland League	5	11th	26	8	4	14	28	Preliminary Round Replay, losing to Hurlford United
2015–16	Lowland League	5	6th	28	13	3	12	42	2nd Round, losing to Inverurie Loco Works
2016–17	Lowland League	5	11th	30	10	7	13	37	1st Round, losing to Whitehill Welfare
2017–18	Lowland League	5	11th	30	9	7	14	34	2nd Round, losing to Fraserburgh
2018–19	Lowland League	5	11th	28	7	9	12	30	1st Round, losing to Whitehill Welfare
2019–20	Lowland League	5	14th†	25	2	6	17	12	1st Round, losing to Lochee United
2020–21	Lowland League	5	16th†	15	1	2	12	5	Preliminary Round Two, losing to Tranent Juniors
2021–22	Lowland League	5	16th	34	8	7	19	31	1st Round replay, losing to Lothian Thistle Hutchison Vale
2022–23	Lowland League	5	18th	36	5	1	30	16	1st Round, losing to Gretna 2008
2023–24	Lowland League	5	18th↓	34	2	3	29	9	1st Round, losing to Dunbar United

† Season curtailed due to the COVID-19 pandemic. ↓ Relegated.

=== East of Scotland League ===
Season	Division	Tier	League						Scottish Cup
Season	Division	Tier	Finish	Played	Wins	Draws	Losses	Points	Scottish Cup
Edinburgh University A.F.C.
2024-25	East of Scotland Premier Division	6	15th↓	30	5	6	19	21	Preliminary Round, losing to Dundonald Bluebell

== Honours ==
East of Scotland Football League

- Runners-up: 1974–75, 2007–08

East of Scotland Football League First Division

- Runners-up: 2000–01

King Cup

- Winners: 1976–77, 2006–07, 2013–14

East of Scotland Shield

- Winners: 1882–83
