= Edinburgh C.F.C. =

Association football club in Scotland

Edinburgh Community Football Club
- Full name: Edinburgh Community Football Club
- Nickname: ECFC
- Founded: 2023
- Ground: St Mark's Park, Warriston, Edinburgh
- Capacity: 2,000
- Coordinates: 55°58′9″N 3°11′34″W
- Chairman: Gary Newall
- Manager: Darren Affleck
- League: East of Scotland League Third Division
- 2025–26: East of Scotland League Third Division, 11th of 11
- Website: http://www.craigroystonfc.co.uk/
| Home colours | Away colours |

Edinburgh Community Football Club (formerly known as Craigroyston Football Club) are a Scottish football club based in Edinburgh, who play their home matches at St Mark's Park in the Warriston area of the city. The team competes in the East of Scotland League Third Division, having moved from the junior leagues in 2018.

== History ==
Craigroyston were founded in 1976 by Rab Melrose, formerly the manager of Eyemouth United. Although associated with a club from the Scottish Borders, Melrose and several of his Eyemouth team were Edinburgh-based, and decided to start a club based in the city. The name of the club was taken from Craigroyston Community Centre in the north of Edinburgh, where they first played their home games.

Having become members of the East of Scotland FA, Craigroyston reached the final of the East of Scotland Qualifying Cup in their first season, and also reached the semi-finals of the City Cup. They subsequently moved into City Park, which they shared with Spartans until 1998. They then moved to their current home, St Mark's Park, in the Warriston area of the city, near the Royal Botanic Garden.

Senior honours won by Craigroyston include the Alex Jack Cup in 1993–94, the King Cup in 1996–97 and the East of Scotland League First Division title in 2005–06 and 2012–13. They were relegated to the First Division twice, in 2008 and 2015.

Craigroyston joined the Scottish Junior Football Association in 2016, and moved from the East of Scotland League to the Scottish Junior Football Association, East Region, for the 2016–17 season.

On 25 May 2018, the club announced that they had applied for, and been successful in their application to rejoin the East of Scotland League for season 2018-19.

The team had been managed since March 2019 by Michael Wilson. In August 2019 Jordyn Sheerin became the new manager. Following his departure mid season, he was succeeded by former Lauriston Th and St Bernards coach Darren Affleck.

Darren has stayed on at the club to join the new coaching staff of Manager Ryan Dinse, Assistant Manager Mikey Smith and Coach Dayne Robertson for the 2020–21 season.

Kenny Aitchison was appointed as new manager at the start of the 2021–22 season.

The club will be managed for the duration of the 2021–22 season by Darren Affleck & Greg Scott with assistance from 20s managers Dean Summer & Rico Wilson in the interim basis until the end of the season.

== Honours ==
East of Scotland Football League First Division

- Winners (2): 2005–06, 2012–13

King Cup

- Winners: 1996–97

Alex Jack Cup

- Winners: 1993–94
