= Easthouses Lily Miners Welfare F.C. =

Association football club in Scotland

Easthouses Lily Miners Welfare
- Full name: Easthouses Lily Miners Welfare Football Club
- Nicknames: The Lily, Houses
- Founded: 1969 (original club 1950)
- Ground: Newbattle Complex, Easthouses
- Capacity: 1,500 (100 seated)
- Coordinates: 55°52′30″N 3°3′5″W
- Manager: David McQueenie
- League: East of Scotland League First Division
- 2025–26: East of Scotland League First Division, 13th of 16
Home colours	Away colours

Easthouses Lily Miners Welfare Football Club are a Scottish football club, based in the Midlothian town of Easthouses. The team currently plays in the East of Scotland League First Division, having moved from the junior leagues in 2018. The club was formed in 1950, following the establishment of the Easthouses Colliery earlier in the 20th century. Home matches are played at Newbattle Complex.

In May 2019 the club became a full member of Scottish Football Association.

== History ==
=== Original Junior club ===
Easthouses Lily F.C. were originally formed in 1950 and competed in the Edinburgh and District Junior League, a forerunner of today's East Region Junior leagues.

Their first season as a Junior club was 1950–51 and was their best, finishing as runners-up to Newtongrange Star in the Mid/East Division, with Star going onto lift the Championship after beating West Division winners Camelon Juniors in the play-off.

The following few seasons saw finishes in the top half of the league including fourth place in 1953–54, however life was always difficult living in the shadow of neighbours Bonnyrigg Rose Athletic, Newtongrange Star and Dalkeith Thistle, and the bottom half of the table gradually became the norm.

Season 1958–59 saw the club reach the Quarter-Finals of the Scottish Junior Cup. A 3–1 win in the first round over local rivals Dalkeith Thistle was followed up with a 4–3 win at Camelon in the second, they received a bye in the third round, the fourth round Lily recorded a 4–1 win at Murray Park over Inverurie Locos before a narrow 1–0 home win over West Calder United in the fifth round led to a Quarter Final meeting at Shettleston, which they lost 3–0. Shettleston went on to lose the final at Hampden to Irvine Meadow.

The following season the fourth round was reached after wins over Nairn Thistle, Dundonald Bluebell plus another bye, leading to a meeting with Ardeer Thistle in Ayrshire which they lost 6–2.

However that turned out to be a couple of rare bright spots and after four successive seasons finishing second bottom with a dramatic fall in attendance numbers, the club encountered difficulties and they were left with no option but to fold at the end of season 1964–65.

After a break of a season a new club, Easthouses & Mayfield United joined the Mid/East Division for season 1966–67 and brought Junior football back to the town, but they only registered 10 league wins in three seasons and withdrew at the end of season 1968–69.

=== Rebirth ===
However that year a group of local friends (James Forrest, James (Cobie) Lamb, Brian McGuff, Robert Paul and George Peacock) reformed the original Easthouses Lily. They began life as members of the Scottish Welfare Football Association, playing in the Lothian Welfare FA and quickly found success by winning numerous pieces of silverware.

Perhaps the club's greatest achievement at that time was reaching the semi-final of the prestigious Scottish Welfare Cup in 1978, where they met Singers F.C. of Clydebank. However, in front of a 2000+ crowd at King's Park, Dalkeith, they lost 2–1 to the side who would eventually go on to lift the trophy.

In 1981, the club joined the ranks of the East Of Scotland Football Association and the East of Scotland Football League where they played at Murray Park, Easthouses. Their first match was a derby against Whitehill Welfare, where a very respectable performance saw them draw 1–1 thanks to a Davy McWhinnie goal. Four days later, the first home game drew a large crowd, who witnessed an eventful, but goalless draw with Civil Service Strollers. Having made Murray Park something of a fortress, the Lily were forced to find a new home when the owners, Murray Brewers, decided to sell the land to a housing developer. The club transferred its matches to the nearby Newbattle Complex, where they remain to this day.

After changing the name to Easthouses Lily Miners Welfare Football Club in 1989, the club enjoyed a ‘golden’ era. The first of three First Division Championships was won in 1990–91, and this was quickly followed by the Premier Division in 1991–92. The Lily are the only club to have achieved back-to-back First and Premier titles since league reconstruction in 1987.

The Alex Jack Cup was also won in 1990–91 and began something of a love affair with the trophy, capturing it again in 1998–99, 2004–05 and 2006–07 and finishing runner-up in 1991–92, 1999–00 and 2001–02. The Lily were also runners-up in the League Cup in 2005–06.

=== League moves ===
Easthouses left the East of Scotland League at the end of the 2014–15 season to join the Scottish Junior Football Association, East Region, citing a new challenge as the motive. At the same time, the club also joined other local youth and amateur sides as part of a wider Easthouses Community Club project. Easthouses returned to the East of Scotland Football League in 2018, as part of a larger movement of junior clubs in the east.

== Managers ==
The team has been managed since January 2003 by David McQueenie.

== Notable players ==
After signing for Lily from Juvenile football and playing the 1951–52 season, Goalkeeper Willie Duff signed for Heart of Midlothian in August 1952 for £200 and went on to win a Scottish Cup and a League Cup winners medal before moving to Charlton Athletic and Peterborough United. He moved back to Scotland with Dunfermline Athletic and helped them reach the European Cup Winners Cup semi-final in 1969.

Another goalkeeper, George Ramage signed for Third Lanark in 1957 before moving south to join Colchester United and eventually finish his career in Australia.

John Fowler signed by Benny Fenton at Colchester United in 1955 he went on to appear 442 times for the "Us".

== Honours ==
East of Scotland Football League Premier Division

- Winners: 1991–92

East of Scotland Football League First Division

- Winners (3): 1990–91, 1998–99, 2004–05

Alex Jack Cup

- Winners (4): 1990–91, 1998–99, 2004–05, 2006–07
