= Heriot-Watt University F.C. =

Association football club in Scotland

Heriot-Watt University
- Full name: Heriot-Watt University Football Club
- Nickname: The Watt
- Founded: 1945
- Ground: John Brydson Arena, Oriam, Riccarton, Edinburgh
- Capacity: 1,800
- Coordinates: 55°54′28″N 3°18′56″W
- Coach: Vacant
- League: East of Scotland League First Division
- 2025–26: East of Scotland League First Division, 14th of 16
- Website: http://www.hwufc.org.uk
Home colours	Away colours

Heriot-Watt University Football Club is a football club based at Riccarton Campus, on the western fringes of Edinburgh. The club's first team plays in the East of Scotland League First Division. Home matches are played on a 3G synthetic pitch within the John Brydson Arena on the university campus at Riccarton. In weekend competition, the club also enters a team into the Lowlands Under-20 Development League; and another into Lothian & Edinburgh Amateur Football Association competition.

Heriot-Watt University also participates in a Community Club in partnership with two youth football clubs based in its locality, Currie Star and Currie FC.

The current head coach is Patrick Cregg who took over towards the end of the 26/27 season. As well as coaching the First Team squad in the East of Scotland League, he also takes charge of the Under-20 and BUCS First Team squads. The all-time top goalscorer of the club is Northern Irishman Chris Donnelly, who was the first HWUFC player to reach one hundred goals in East of Scotland competition.

Former players include Adam Crozier, British businessman and television executive (former Chief Executive of The Football Association, of Royal Mail Group and of ITV; currently Chairman of BT Group). In recent years, a number of former players have gone on to play for clubs in the Scottish Professional Football League. These include Barney Stewart (Falkirk), Anton Dowds (Ayr United), Aidan Quinn, Alasdair Shrive and Craig Smith (all Montrose).

== History ==
The club was founded around 1945 as Heriot-Watt College F.C. After Heriot-Watt became a university and moved most of its activity to its new campus at Riccarton, (a move which was substantially complete by 1971), the club, now named Heriot-Watt University F.C., applied to join the East of Scotland Football Association and League. It played in the league for the first time in season 1971–72 and has continued in membership since that time.

For the first three decades of its membership of the East of Scotland League, the club struggled to make an impact, although it did reach the Final of the East of Scotland Qualifying Cup in season 1973–74. The early years of the new century saw an improvement in the club's performances and for the first time it gained promotion to the Premier Division in 2005. The following season under head coach Billy Henderson the club won its first trophy, the East of Scotland League Cup, and finished in second place in the league, two points behind winners Edinburgh City.

The club was relegated twice during the course of the next five seasons, but on each occasion returned immediately as First Division champions. A second cup success occurred in 2009 when the King Cup was won, an achievement which the Club repeated in season 2021–22.

In season 2022–23, playing in the Second Division of the greatly-expanded league structure which now constitutes the East of Scotland League, Heriot-Watt finished third, thereby gaining promotion to the First Division (tier two) for season 2023–24.

The club's successful youth team, which will play in the new East of Scotland Development League during 2023–24, won the league in its previous manifestation, the Lowland and East of Scotland Development League, in season 2017–18.

=== Student competitions ===
A large part of the club's purpose is to provide the opportunity for football training and playing to as great a number of students as possible, so six men's teams and one women's team are entered into the competitions operated by British Universities and Colleges Sport (BUCS) and Scottish Student Sport (SSS), with the matches being played on Wednesday afternoons. The Queen's Park Shield is the most prestigious trophy for male student football clubs from Scottish Universities and Colleges. It was originally presented to the winners of the league (BUCS Scottish Conference) and the club's successes in the early years of the current century were for winning the league; but since the University of Stirling moved into the National League North, the Queen's Park Shield has been presented to the winners of the top cup competition in SSS competition.

HWUFC first won the QPS in the 1972–73 season when the club shared it with the University of Aberdeen Football club. Despite winning ten games from ten across the season, HWUFC were docked points by the Scottish Amateur Football Association due to playing an ineligible player in an entirely separate East of Scotland League fixture that same season. Kenny Laird, who was previously registered as a professional player with Peebles Rovers Football Club had been registered as an amateur player by HWUFC - due to this the club was banned from all football for five months and stripped of the Queen's Park Shield title. Following an appeal, it was agreed that the trophy would be shared with second placed side, the University of Aberdeen FC.

HWUFC next won the competition in the 1993/94 season. The Club Captain at the time was goalkeeper Mike Tumilty, who went on to become a well known and respected SFA Category 1 Referee, as well as a prominent name across the Financial Sector as Global Chief Operating Officer at Aberdeen Group plc.

The club wouldn't win the QPS again until the 2002–03 season. In what was undoubtedly the 'Golden Generation' for the club, the trophy was retained for the following four seasons. This five-in-a-row achievement was the first of its kind by any University in the modern era of the competition. The Queen's Park Shield returned to Riccarton in 2022 when Heriot-Watt won the cup competition, beating the University of Stirling in the Final. In 2024 and 2026 the QPS again returned to Riccarton, as Heriot-Watt defeated the University of Stirling 2-0 and 3-2 respectively to win the clubs 9th and 10th Queens Park Shield finals.

Most of the talented side which had secured the Queen's Park Shield remained for season 2022–23, at the end of which Heriot-Watt won the BUCS Scottish championship and for the first time ever gained promotion to the National League North by defeating the University of Birmingham and Leeds Beckett University in play-off matches under Head Coach and former student player, Banji Koya.

== Honours ==
Queens Park Shield and BUCS Scottish Conference

- Champions (11): 1972–73, 1992–93, 2002–03, 2003–04, 2004–05, 2005–06, 2006–07, 2007–08, 2021–22, 2023–24, 2025-26
- Cup Winners: 2021–22
- BUCS Scottish Championship: 2022–23

East of Scotland Football League First Division

- Winners (2): 2007–08, 2011–12

East of Scotland League Cup

- Winners: 2005–06

King Cup

- Winners (3): 2008–09, 2021–22, 2023–24

East of Scotland Development League West Division

- Winners (3): 2017–18, 2023–24
