= Preston Athletic F.C. =

Association football club in Scotland

Preston Athletic
- Full name: Preston Athletic Football Club
- Nickname: The Panners
- Founded: 1945; 81 years ago
- Ground: Pennypit Park, Prestonpans
- Capacity: 1,500 (313 seated)
- Coordinates: 55°57′27″N 2°59′8″W
- Chairman: Donald Reid
- Manager: Stevie McLeish
- League: East of Scotland League Premier Division
- 2025–26: East of Scotland League First Division, 4th of 16 (promoted)
- Website: http://www.prestonathletic.co.uk/
Home colours	Away colours

Preston Athletic Football Club are a Scottish football club based in the town of Prestonpans, East Lothian. The club are nicknamed the Panners and play their home matches at Pennypit Park. The team play in dark blue.

They were founding members of the Lowland Football League in 2013, but after being relegated in 2017 now play in the East of Scotland League Premier Division.

== History ==
Founded in 1945, they were originally a junior club and only entered the senior ranks in 1994 when they joined the East of Scotland Football League. As a full member of the Scottish Football Association, Preston are automatically eligible to enter the Scottish Cup. They first qualified for the competition proper in 2002–03, losing 1–0 at home to Hamilton Academical in the first round.

The club applied unsuccessfully to join the Scottish Football League in 2000 and 2002. In 2008 Preston Athletic were one of five clubs to prepare an application for entry into the Scottish Football League following Gretna relinquishing their league status, however they were again unsuccessful after losing out to Annan Athletic.

At the end of the 2016–17 season Preston Athletic were relegated to the East of Scotland League, having spent four seasons in the Lowland League.

== Honours ==
East of Scotland Football League First Division

- Winners: 2001–02
- Runners-up (2): 1994–95, 2011–12

King Cup

- Runners-up: 2017–18

Alex Jack Cup

- Winners: 1994–95

== Notable players and coaches ==
The first professional coach of Preston Athletic was Paddy Buckley, a former Aberdeen and Scotland striker whose son, Paddy Junior went on from Preston Athletic to play for Third Lanark, Wolverhampton Wanderers, Rotherham United and Sheffield United.
