= Peebles Rovers F.C. =

Association football club in Scotland

Peebles Rovers
- Full name: Peebles Rovers Football Club
- Nickname: Rovers
- Founded: 1888 as Greenside Rovers, changed name to Peebles Rovers in 1890
- Ground: Whitestone Park, Peebles
- Capacity: 2,250 (250 seated)
- Chairman: Colin Macdonald
- League: East of Scotland League Second Division
- 2025–26: East of Scotland League Second Division, 10th of 15
- Website: http://peeblesroversfc.com/
Home colours	Away colours

Peebles Rovers Football Club is a currently inactive Scottish football club based in Peebles, Scottish Borders. Originally founded in 1888 as Greenside Rovers, the club changed their name to Peebles Rovers in May 1890. This is at odds with the official date of 1893 which appears to be based upon what was written in a newspaper article in 1947. They play their home matches at Whitestone Park. The club were most recently members of the East of Scotland Football League, but went into abeyance in 2025 before resigning from the league in 2026. They were briefly members of the Scottish Football League, between 1923 and 1926.

== History ==
Peebles Rovers were members of the Scottish Football League Third Division between 1923 and 1926, and had only a modest record – finishing 14th and 8th in the two full seasons played, and were 14th in the unfinished 1925–26 season. All told, Peebles Rovers played 86 Scottish Football League matches, winning 28, drawing 15 and losing 43. They scored 159 goals and conceded 190. Their record victory at their Whitestone Park home was 7–1 against Beith on 18 April 1925. Their best away win was 5–2 away against Galston, seven days previously on 11 April 1925. In 1937 Peebles Rovers moved from their traditional home in Victoria Park to Whitestone park, after a local businessman successfully managed to acquire planning rights to the eastern end of Victoria Park, intending substantial development that was subsequently curtailed due to the start of World War II.

Peebles Rovers themselves were active long before the Third Division, being formed in 1888 and have played in the Scottish Cup proper over twenty times. Their first appearance was back in 1907–08, when they lost 4–0 away to Celtic. In their first 11 appearances, they were drawn away from home on each and every occasion, spanning 19 ties in all. They managed to win three of these and draw two, including holding Hibernian to a 0–0 draw at Easter Road in 1923 – easily their best result in the competition. In this season, Paddy McBoyle starred as top scorer with a total of 27 league goals.

Other than a replay win over St Cuthbert's Wanderers, they did not have a home tie until beating Keith 7–3 in 1926. They drew away to Albion Rovers in the next round, before losing the replay. They also drew with their Coatbridge namesakes in 1957, and again lost the replay.

The season before that, they were involved in a marathon tie with Brechin City. There was a 1–1 draw away, 4–4 at home after extra time, 0–0 in a second replay at Easter Road, again after extra time and finally losing 6–2 in a third replay, at Tannadice.

After that they took some serious hammerings, losing 10–0 away to St Mirren in 1959, 6–1 at home against Ayr United the next year, and then a 15–1 slaughter away to Hibernian in 1961. Joe Baker scored nine that day and his brother Gerry grabbed four in the earlier debacle at Love Street. During the 1959–1960 season, there was a record 23–2 defeat at the hands of Partick Thistle.

Their final appearance was better though, in 1965–66, they drew 2–2 at Dumbarton and took the Sons to extra time in the replay before losing 3–2. After the match both sides celebrated the match as an exemplar of what football could be.

Their greatest moment in the Qualifying Cup (South) came in the 1953–54 competition, when they defeated Shawfield Amateurs 6–1, Burntisland Shipyard 7–0, Selkirk 4–2 (all at home) and Coldstream 4–1 after a 1–1 draw away to reach the final. Latterly the club is only an associate member of the Scottish Football Association due to the inadequate facilities at Whitestone Park, thus becoming ineligible to compete in the Scottish Cup.

While Peebles Rovers won many minor and local competitions, the highest level they played at, the Third Division apart, is the East of Scotland League, which they won on six occasions – 1928–29, 1932–33, 1933–34, 1934–35, 1935–36 and 1945–46.

In the 1966–67, Rovers joined the junior grade of football and entered a period of decline, until they rejoined the senior ranks in the East of Scotland League in 1980–81. When that set-up was altered to two divisions in the late-1980s, they found themselves in the second tier, and during this period endured a prolonged period of financial hardship resulting in several members of the squad volunteering in the local town to make ends meet. Although they won promotion several times, their stays in the Premier were of short duration. In the 2007–08 season, Peebles won promotion to the East of Scotland Premier Division, but were relegated back to the First Division in the 2010–11 season.

Largest crowds to watch them have been 14,000 and 10,453, both at Easter Road in the Scottish Cup in 1923 and 1961. The record gate at Whitestone Park is recorded as 1,750 for the 4–2 first round Scottish Cup win over Gala Fairydean in 1961.

Michael Wilson was named the club's new manager in April 2020. Wilson was joined in December 2020 by Colin Macdonald, a local businessman who accepted the role of Club Chairman. Following a poor start to the 2022/23 season, Wilson joined Vale of Leithen, leaving the way clear for Ger Rossi to return as manager for a second spell after a successful period with the club a few years earlier.

Despite a late run of form saving the club from relegation to the Third Division in the 2024/25 season, the club withdrew from all competitions the following season as their Whitestone Park ground did not meet league requirements, and they had to look for an alternative home park.

A year later, having failed to come to a resolution, the club tendered its resignation from the East of Scotland Football League after 46 years of membership. The club emphasised that the club has not folded, and will continue to look for a way to bring senior football back to Peebles.

== Honours ==
East of Scotland Football League

- Winners: 1928–29, 1932–33, 1933–34, 1934–35, 1935–36, 1945–46
- Runners-up: 1938–39, 1948–49, 1952–53, 1954–55, 1956–57, 1963–64

East of Scotland Football League First Division

- Winners: 1988–89, 1997–98, 2014–15
- Runners-up: 2001–02, 2007–08

King Cup

- Winners: 1907–08, 1952–53, 1953–54, 1961–62, 1962–63, 2014–15

Alex Jack Cup

- Winners: 1999–00
- Runners-up: 2014–15, 2007–08

== Coronation Cup ==
The Coronation Cup was an annual five-a-side tournament run under the auspices of the football club, Peebles Cricket Club and the March Riding Committee.

The trophy was presented to the football club by Mr M.G. Thorburn of Glenormiston for the first competition in 1911.

Year	Winners	Result	Runners-up	Ref
1912	Fairydean Rovers	2–1	Peebles Rovers	
1913	Five Saints (Note: Five Saints were a mixed team of SFL Division One players.)	1–1 (Note: Five Saints declared winners on tiebreaker by count of 2–0 on points in 1913.)	Larkhall Thistle	
1914	Five Saints	–		
1916	Lowland Field Ambulance (Note: Confined to RAMC teams in 1916.)	2–0	Highland Field Ambulance	
1921	Five Saints	2–1	Peebles Rovers	
1922	Vale of Leithen 'B'	2–1	Vale of Leithen 'A'	
1923	Hibernian	1–0	Heart of Midlothian	
1924	Peebles Rovers	1–0	Lanark	
1925	Vale of Leithen 'B'	1–0	Heart of Midlothian	
1926	Celtic	1–0	Partick Thistle	
1927	Celtic	1–0	Bo'ness	
1928	Partick Thistle	1–0	Celtic	
1929	Partick Thistle	5–0	Glasgow Select	

== See also ==
- Category:Peebles Rovers F.C. players
