= Kelso United F.C. =

Association football club in Scottish Borders, Scotland

Kelso United
- Full name: Kelso United Football Club
- Founded: 1935
- Dissolved: 2015
- Ground: Woodside Park, Kelso
- Capacity: 1,200
- 2015–16: East of Scotland League, 16th (withdrew)
Home colours	Away colours

Kelso United Football Club were a senior football club based in Kelso, Scotland who played in the East of Scotland Football League. The club resigned from the league after three games of the 2015–16 season. Their final game was against Burntisland Shipyard on 29 August 2015 resulting in a 5–0 defeat.

The club was founded at a meeting in the Drill Hall, Kelso, in April 1935.

Kelso played their home matches at Woodside Park on Dry House Lane. The first league the club played in was the Border Junior League. Their first notable success at this level was winning the Dudley Cup in 1935. The next season, United joined the Berwickshire FA, despite being based in Roxburghshire. The 1937–38 season was very successful for the club, as the Conan Doyle Cup, the Dudley Cup and the league championship shield were all added to the honours list.

Although no-one from Kelso at that time became an internationalist, many went to bigger, professional clubs.

After the war Kelso United reformed and entered a second XI into the Kelso and District League, while the main team played in the Border Amateur league. In the 1957–58 season, the club lifted the South of Scotland Cup East section, but lost the overall final to West section winners Broughton.

The 1959–60 season was another good year with the Border Cup and the Ancrum 5-a-side competition being annexed.

In the mid-60s after a massive gap of 29 years, United were once again Border Amateur League champions. Big decisions were made leading up to 1967–68 season, one was that the first team would join the East of Scotland Football League, and that the second team which had disappeared, would reform and take the first teams place in the Border League. This was a successful move as the United team were League and King Cup runners-up. In 1971, the club decided to work more on bringing in local players, but this was not sustainable and they left the East of Scotland League. However, back in the Amateur League the club flourished, conquering the Beveridge Cup, as well as the South of Scotland Cup. In 1974 they won the Border Cup.

By the 1974–75 season, the club felt ready to rejoin the East of Scotland League, and in 1980 won their biggest cup yet, the King Cup. Since then the club have held their own in the league, reaching the final of the Image Printers Cup in the mid-90s, as well as getting promoted to the Premier league in 2004, although they were relegated at the end of the 2005–06 season.

In September 2015, the club resigned from the East of Scotland League and merged with nearby Kelso Thistle to form Kelso United Thistle, who now play in the Border Amateur League.

== Honours ==
King Cup

- Winners: 1979–80

Alex Jack Cup

- Winners (2): 1989–90, 2001–02
