= Ormiston Primrose F.C. =

Association football club in Scotland

Ormiston Primrose
- Full name: Ormiston Primrose Football Club
- Nickname: Ormi
- Founded: 1890
- Ground: New Recreation Park, Ormiston
- Capacity: 1,000
- Coordinates: 55°54′29″N 2°56′47″W
- Chairman: Tom Weir
- Manager: Mark Smith
- League: East of Scotland League Third Division
- 2025–26: East of Scotland League Third Division, 10th of 11
- Website: https://www.ormistonprimrose.co.uk/
Home colours	Away colours

Ormiston Primrose Football Club is a senior football club based in Ormiston, East Lothian, currently competing in the East of Scotland League Third Division.

The club was founded in 1890 and amalgamated with former East of Scotland League team Pencaitland in 1999.

Ormiston play their home matches at New Recreation Park, which was completed in 2018 (along with a new changing pavilion) as a replacement to the old Recreation Park which stood on adjacent land and closed a year earlier. In the intervening period, the club used the Hibernian Training Centre located a short distance to the north of Ormiston. An official partnership with professionals Hibernian had already been arranged in 2014 to strengthen the Edinburgh club's presence in the local area and give Ormiston some practical assistance.

== History ==
Pencaitland, from the nearby village of the same name, were originally founded in 1919. They won the Scottish Amateur Cup in 1984 and then joined the East of Scotland League in 1986, eventually gaining promotion and competing in the Premier Division for four seasons.

Ormiston Primrose were originally founded in the 1890s - they reached the final of the Scottish Junior Cup in 1989 and twice won the East of Scotland Junior Cup.

For a couple of years the club used the name Pencaitland & Ormiston but decided to shorten it to just Ormiston F.C. in 2003, although they retain strong links to Pencaitland. Meanwhile, Pencaitland AFC reformed as a separate amateur club, competing in the Lothian & Edinburgh Amateur Football Association (LEAFA).

Ahead of the 2022–23 season, the club changed their name back to Ormiston Primrose.

== Honours ==
As Pencaitland

East of Scotland League First Division

- Winners: 1994–95

As Pencaitland & Ormiston

East of Scotland League First Division

- Winners: 2000–01
