= Eyemouth United F.C. =

Association football club in Scotland

Eyemouth United
- Full name: Eyemouth United Football Club
- Nicknames: The Fishermen, The Gulls
- Founded: 1948
- Ground: Warner Park, Eyemouth
- Capacity: 2,000
- Manager: John Crawford & Lee Crawford
- 2020–21: East of Scotland League First Division Conference B (season abandoned)
- Website: http://www.eyemouthunited.com
Home colours	Away colours

Eyemouth United Football Club are a football club currently playing in the Border Amateur Football League. Founded in 1948, the club, nicknamed The Fishermen play at Warner Park, Eyemouth, Berwickshire. The club's colours are maroon shirts, shorts and socks for their home strip; and Sky Blue shirts, sky blue shorts and socks for their away strip. They are currently managed by John Crawford & Lee Crawford.

Eyemouth were previously members of the Scottish Football Association and were allowed to enter the Scottish Cup. Their most successful run in the competition was when they reached the quarter-finals in 1959–60, eventually losing 2–1 at home to that year's finalists Kilmarnock.

== Honours ==
- East of Scotland League Champions: 1954–55, 1955–56, 1956–57, 1970–71
- Scottish Qualifying Cup South Winners: 1952–53, 1958–59, 1959–60
- East of Scotland (City) Cup: 1950–51, 1957–58
- East of Scotland Qualifying Cup: 1953–54, 1955–56, 1956–57, 1958–59, 1971–72
- King Cup: 1958–59
- Scottish Border Counties FA Challenge Cup: 1954–55
- South Supplementary Cup: 1954–55
