= 2025–26 Lowland Football League =

Scottish football league season

Lowland League
- Season: 2025–26
- Dates: 25 July 2025 - 18 April 2026
- Champions: Linlithgow Rose
- Matches: 306
- Goals: 1,122 (3.67 per match)
- Top goalscorer: Lennon Walker (Caledonian Braves); (27 goals)
- Biggest home win: Celtic B 6–0 Civil Service Strollers (10 March 2026)
- Biggest away win: Hearts B 0–8 Clydebank (20 March 2026)
- Highest scoring: 4 matches: 9 goals (Note: The matches were Gala Fairydean Rovers 3–6 East Stirlingshire on 30 August 2025, Linlithgow Rose 4–5 University of Stirling on 4 October 2025, Gretna 2008 4–5 Celtic B on 16 December 2025, and Gretna 2008 2–7 Berwick Rangers on 11 April 2026.)
- Longest winning run: 13 matches: Bonnyrigg Rose
- Longest unbeaten run: 14 matches: Bonnyrigg Rose
- Longest winless run: 14 matches: East Stirlingshire
- Longest losing run: 10 matches: Gretna 2008
- All statistics correct as of 18 April 2026.

The 2025–26 Scottish Lowland Football League (known as the Park's Motor Group Scottish Lowland Football League for sponsorship reasons) was the 13th season of the Lowland Football League, part of the fifth tier of the Scottish football pyramid system. East Kilbride were the reigning champions but were unable to defend their title following their promotion to Scottish League Two.

This was the final season in the league's current format before the league splits into Lowland League East and Lowland League West ahead of season 2026–27, with no relegation taking place this season irrespective of results.

Three teams went into the final round of matches with a chance of winning the league – Linlithgow Rose, Clydebank and Bonnyrigg Rose. Linlithgow Rose's 2–1 win over Bonnyrigg Rose ensured they won the title by two points over Clydebank, having won eleven out of their last twelve games. However, they were ineligible for the Pyramid play-off due to not possessing a bronze SFA club licence.

== Teams ==
Location of teams in 2025–26 Scottish Lowland Football League

Bonnyrigg Rose became the fifth club to join the league from the SPFL and the first of the promoted clubs to rejoin the league via relegation, having lost the previous season's League Two play-off against East Kilbride.

=== From Lowland League ===
Folded

- Broomhill

Promoted to Scottish League Two

- East Kilbride

=== To Lowland League ===
Relegated from Scottish League Two

- Bonnyrigg Rose

Promoted from West of Scotland Premier Division

- Clydebank

=== Stadia and locations ===
Team	Location	Stadium	Surface	Capacity	Seats
Albion Rovers	Coatbridge	Cliftonhill	Grass	1,572	489
Berwick Rangers	Berwick-upon-Tweed	Shielfield Park	Grass	4,099	1,366
Bo'ness United	Bo'ness	Newtown Park	Artificial	2,000	0
Bonnyrigg Rose	Bonnyrigg	New Dundas Park	Grass	2,020	72
Broxburn Athletic	Broxburn	Albyn Park	Artificial	2,050	0
Caledonian Braves	Motherwell	Alliance Park	Artificial	800	102
Celtic B	Airdrie	Excelsior Stadium (Note: Celtic B are ground-sharing with Airdrieonians.)	Artificial	10,101	10,101
Civil Service Strollers	Edinburgh	Christie Gillies Park	Grass	1,596	96
Clydebank	Clydebank	Holm Park	Artificial	1,200	0
Cowdenbeath	Cowdenbeath	Central Park	Grass	4,309	1,622
Cumbernauld Colts	Cumbernauld	Broadwood Stadium	Artificial	8,086	8,086
East Stirlingshire	Stenhousemuir	Ochilview Park (Note: East Stirlingshire are ground-sharing with Stenhousemuir.)	Artificial	3,746	626
Gala Fairydean Rovers	Galashiels	3G Arena, Netherdale	Artificial	2,000	500
Gretna 2008	Gretna	Raydale Park	Artificial	1,030	138
Heart of Midlothian B	Edinburgh	Ainslie Park (Note: Heart of Midlothian B are ground-sharing with The Spartans.)	Artificial	3,700	854
Linlithgow Rose	Linlithgow	Prestonfield	Grass	1,730	301
Tranent	Tranent	Foresters Park	Grass	1,200	44
University of Stirling	Stirling	Forthbank Stadium (Note: University of Stirling are ground-sharing with Stirling Albion.)	Grass	3,808	2,508

Notes

All grounds are equipped with floodlights.

=== Personnel and kits ===
Team	Manager	Captain	Kit manufacturer	Shirt sponsor
Albion Rovers	(Scotland) Sandy Clark	(Scotland) Alan Reid	Uhlsport	Ribble Enviro
Berwick Rangers	(Scotland) Kevin Haynes	(Scotland) Jamie Pyper	Macron	NE Scaffolding
Bo'ness United	(Scotland) Stuart Hunter	(Scotland) Kyle Johnston	Adidas	JB Training and Lifting Solutions
Bonnyrigg Rose	(Scotland) Jonny Stewart	(Scotland) Neil Martyniuk	TBC	TBC
Broxburn Athletic	(Scotland) John Millar	(Scotland) Errol Douglas	TBC	TBC
Caledonian Braves	(Scotland) Ricky Waddell	(Scotland) Ross McNeil	TBC	TBC
Celtic B	(Scotland) Stephen McManus	(Scotland) Samuel Isiguzo	Adidas	Dafabet
Civil Service Strollers	(Scotland) Gary Jardine	(Scotland) Mark Laird	TBC	TBC
Clydebank	(Scotland) Gordon Moffat	(Scotland) Nicky Little	Joma	The Co-operative brand (Clydebank)
Cowdenbeath	(Scotland) Paul McLean	(Scotland) Jack Denham	TBC	TBC
Cumbernauld Colts	(Scotland) John Doyle	(Scotland) Cameron Dickson	TBC	TBC
East Stirlingshire	(England) Callum Tapping	(Senegal) Morgaro Gomis	TBC	TBC
Gala Fairydean Rovers	(Scotland) Martin Scott	(Scotland) Danny Galbraith	TBC	TBC
Gretna 2008	(Scotland) Vincent Parker	(England) Jim Atkinson	TBC	TBC
Hearts B	(Scotland) Angus Beith	(Wales) Kai Smutek	Hummel	Stellar Omada
Linlithgow Rose	(Scotland) Gordon Herd	(Scotland) Gary Thom	TBC	TBC
Tranent	(Scotland) Robbie Horn	(Scotland) Euan Bauld	TBC	TBC
University of Stirling	(Scotland) Chris Geddes	(England) Ben Heal	TBC	TBC

=== Managerial changes ===
Team	Outgoing manager	Manner of departure	Date of vacancy	Position in table	Incoming manager	Date of appointment
Cowdenbeath	(Scotland) Dougie Hill	Resigned	19 April 2025	Pre-season	(Scotland) Paul McLean	28 April 2025
Tranent	(Scotland) Darren Smith	End of interim spell	1 June 2025	Pre-season	(Scotland) Robbie Horn	1 June 2025
Broxburn Athletic	(United States) Steve Pittman	Resigned	27 August 2025	8th	(Scotland) Derek McWilliams (interim)	27 August 2025
East Stirlingshire	(Scotland) Pat Scullion	Mutual consent	27 August 2025	18th	(Scotland) Matty Flynn (interim)	27 August 2025
Broxburn Athletic	(Scotland) Derek McWilliams (interim)	End of interim spell	31 August 2025	5th	(Scotland) John Millar	31 August 2025
East Stirlingshire	(Scotland) Matty Flynn (interim)	End of interim spell	1 September 2025	17th	(England) Callum Tapping	1 September 2025

== League table ==
Pos	Team	Pld	W	D	L	GF	GA	GD	Pts	Qualification
1	Linlithgow Rose (C)	34	24	3	7	89	39	+50	75	
2	Clydebank	34	23	4	7	94	39	+55	73	
3	Bonnyrigg Rose	34	21	6	7	79	42	+37	69	
4	Tranent	34	20	7	7	63	32	+31	67	
5	Caledonian Braves	34	18	5	11	75	48	+27	59	
6	Cumbernauld Colts	34	17	5	12	72	53	+19	56	
7	Broxburn Athletic	34	15	7	12	68	61	+7	52	
8	Berwick Rangers	34	14	7	13	62	68	−6	49	
9	Bo'ness United	34	14	6	14	61	56	+5	48	
10	Celtic B	34	12	10	12	73	71	+2	46	Ineligible for promotion
11	Cowdenbeath	34	12	9	13	51	53	−2	45	
12	Gala Fairydean Rovers	34	13	2	19	52	66	−14	41	
13	Albion Rovers	34	12	3	19	48	71	−23	39	
14	Civil Service Strollers	34	11	5	18	40	79	−39	38	
15	University of Stirling	34	9	7	18	55	82	−27	34	
16	Heart of Midlothian B	34	7	8	19	42	78	−36	29	Ineligible for promotion
17	Gretna 2008	34	7	7	20	50	90	−40	28	
18	East Stirlingshire	34	5	3	26	48	94	−46	18	

Source: SLFL BBC Sport Soccerway
Rules for classification: 1) Points; 2) Goal difference; 3) Number of goals scored
(C) Champions

== Results ==
Home \ Away	ALB	BER	BNS	BON	BRX	CAL	CEL	CSS	CLY	COW	CUM	EAS	GFR	GRE	HEA	LIN	TRA	STI
Albion Rovers		4–1	1–1	0–3	2–3	0–3	3–2	4–1	0–1	1–0	3–3	1–0	2–1	2–0	2–0	2–6	0–1	5–0
Berwick Rangers	3–1		4–2	2–2	0–5	1–4	1–3	1–1	1–2	2–0	2–3	2–2	2–3	3–2	2–0	3–1	0–0	0–0
Bo'ness United	5–2	1–3		1–1	1–2	2–3	2–2	3–0	2–5	1–1	3–2	2–0	4–0	4–3	3–1	2–0	1–0	2–0
Bonnyrigg Rose	1–1 (Note: Match played at Ferguson Park, Rosewell, due to pitch renovation works at New Dundas Park.)	3–4 (Note: Match played at Ferguson Park, Rosewell, due to pitch renovation works at New Dundas Park.)	4–0		2–0	3–2	5–1 (Note: Match played at Ferguson Park, Rosewell, due to pitch renovation works at New Dundas Park.)	2–0	3–2	3–2	1–0 (Note: Match played at Ferguson Park, Rosewell, due to pitch renovation works at New Dundas Park.)	4–0	4–2	1–2 (Note: Match played at Ferguson Park, Rosewell, due to pitch renovation works at New Dundas Park.)	4–0	1–2	1–0	1–1 (Note: Match played at Ferguson Park, Rosewell, due to pitch renovation works at New Dundas Park.)
Broxburn Athletic	3–0	5–0	1–2	2–2		0–2	1–1	2–2	2–1	3–0	3–3	4–2	1–0	4–2	3–3	1–6	1–3	5–1
Caledonian Braves	3–4	3–0	1–5 (Note: Match played at K-Park Training Academy, East Kilbride, due to ground issues at Alliance Park.)	1–3	1–1		4–3	1–4	4–1	3–0 (Note: Match played at New Douglas Park, Hamilton, due to ground issues at Alliance Park.)	4–1	2–0	4–1	3–0	5–1	0–1	3–0	3–0 (Note: Match played at New Douglas Park, Hamilton, due to pitch replacement work at Alliance Park.)
Celtic B	2–0	3–0	1–3	3–3	3–2	1–1		6–0	3–1	2–2 (Note: Match played at K-Park Training Academy, East Kilbride, due to a clashing fixture at the Excelsior Stadium.)	3–1	4–2	1–2	5–3	0–1	1–3	3–2	2–2
Civil Service Strollers	2–0	0–1	1–0	1–5 (Note: Match played at Ainslie Park.)	1–3	0–2	3–3		0–5	1–4	0–5	1–0	2–1	1–2	2–2	0–2	1–0	2–5
Clydebank	4–2	3–3	2–0	5–1	4–0	2–0	4–0	1–0		1–1	1–3	2–0	2–1	5–0	2–2	1–1	1–2	2–1
Cowdenbeath	1–0	0–2	1–0	2–1	1–2	2–1	2–1	4–0	0–4		1–1	1–4	2–2	4–2	3–0	1–2	1–1	1–2
Cumbernauld Colts	4–0	3–2	3–1	0–1	1–0	2–2	3–3	4–0	1–2	0–2		3–2	3–2	3–1	3–0	0–2	1–2	4–1
East Stirlingshire	1–2	1–3	1–3	1–5	0–3	0–3	3–2	0–2	0–6	1–4	0–4		2–1	2–3	4–2	0–1	2–4	2–3
Gala Fairydean Rovers	2–0	1–2	3–1	0–3	2–1	2–0	1–1	0–2	0–3	0–3	2–3	3–6		3–0	3–1	0–4	1–3	2–0
Gretna 2008	1–2	2–7	1–0	2–1	2–2	1–1	4–5	1–2	0–2	2–1	2–1	1–1	1–4		4–4	0–6	0–2	2–2
Heart of Midlothian B	3–0	1–3	2–1	1–2	0–1	1–1	0–1	1–2	0–8	1–1	1–2	3–3	0–2	1–1		3–0	1–5	2–1
Linlithgow Rose	2–1	2–0	3–1	1–2	5–0	4–0	3–0	3–3	4–1	5–1	2–1	4–3	1–2	2–0	1–2		1–1	4–5
Tranent	4–0	0–0	1–1	1–0	3–0	2–1	3–1	4–0	0–5	1–1	2–0	1–0	2–1	1–1 (Note: Match played at Ainslie Park, Edinburgh, due to drainage issues at Foresters Park.)	2–0	0–1		5–2
University of Stirling	4–1	5–2	1–1	0–1	3–2	0–4	1–1	2–3	2–3	1–1	0–1	5–3	0–2	3–2	1–2	1–4	0–5	

Legend: Blue = home team win; Yellow = draw; Red = away team win.

== Promotion and relegation ==
Due to the restructure into Lowland League East and Lowland League West, there will be automatic promotion of champions of the 2025–26 East of Scotland Football League, the 2025–26 South of Scotland Football League, 2025–26 West of Scotland Football League and the 2025–26 Midlands Football League, subject to these clubs meeting the required licensing criteria for promotion. No teams will be relegated in 2025–26.

Further clubs may be promoted either automatically or via play-offs, depending on the number of licensed clubs in each league, with details as yet unannounced.

As Brechin City failed to be promoted from the 2025–26 Highland League, they will enter the 2026–27 Lowland League East.
