= 2017–18 Scottish Cup =

2017–18 William Hill Scottish Cup
Tournament details
- Country: Scotland
- Teams: 91

Final positions
- Champions: Celtic
- Runners-up: Motherwell

Tournament statistics
- Matches played: 96
- Goals scored: 340 (3.54 per match)
- Top goal scorer(s): Rory McAllister (7 goals)
- All statistics correct as of 19 May 2018.

The 2017–18 Scottish Cup was the 133rd season of Scotland's most prestigious football knockout competition. The tournament was sponsored by bookmaker William Hill in what was the seventh season of a nine-year partnership, after contract negotiations saw the initial five-year contract extended for an additional four years in October 2015.

The defending champions were Celtic who won the 2017 Scottish Cup Final on 27 May 2017.

== Calendar ==
The calendar for the 2017–18 Scottish Cup qualifying rounds, as announced by Scottish Football Association.

| Round | Main date | Number of fixtures | Clubs | New Entries |
|---|---|---|---|---|
| Preliminary round 1 | 12 August 2017 | 3 | 91 → 88 | 15 |
| Preliminary round 2 | 2 September 2017 | 6 | 88 → 82 | None |
| First round | 23 September 2017 | 18 | 82 → 64 | 30 |
| Second round | 14 October 2017 | 16 | 64 → 48 | 14 |
| Third round | 18 November 2017 | 16 | 48 → 32 | 16 |
| Fourth round | 20 January 2018 | 16 | 32 → 16 | 16 |
| Fifth round | 10 February 2018 | 8 | 16 → 8 | None |
| Quarter-finals | 3 March 2018 | 4 | 8 → 4 | None |
| Semi-finals | 14 & 15 April 2018 | 2 | 4 → 2 | None |
| Final | 19 May 2018 | 1 | 2 → 1 | None |

== Preliminary rounds ==
The draw for the preliminary rounds took place on Monday, 10 July 2017 at Hampden Park and was made by Scotland internationals Gemma Fay and Ifeoma Dieke.

15 clubs were involved in the draw, of which nine received a bye to the second preliminary round, while the other six entered the first preliminary round. The teams competing in these rounds were made up of teams from the East of Scotland Football League (5), South of Scotland Football League (3), North Caledonian Football League (1), Scottish Junior Football Association (4) and the Scottish Amateur Football Association (2). Glenafton Athletic took part in the Scottish Cup for the first time after winning the 2016–17 West of Scotland Super League Premier Division and the 2016–17 Scottish Junior Cup.

There were three parts to the draw. The first part determined which nine clubs, from the 11 eligible, received a bye to the second preliminary round. The two clubs which did not receive a bye into the second preliminary round entered the first preliminary round. Three ties were then drawn in the first preliminary round to be played on Saturday, 12 August 2017. The final part of the draw saw six ties drawn in the second preliminary round to be played on Saturday, 2 September 2017. Wigtown & Bladnoch were in the draw when it was first announced, but withdrew from the competition before the date of the draw.

=== Preliminary round one ===
==== Draw ====
Clubs with a valid club licence at the date of the draw are eligible for a bye to the second preliminary round. Teams in Bold advanced to the first round.

| Clubs eligible for a bye | Clubs participating in the first preliminary round draw |
|---|---|
| 1. **Banks O’Dee**; 2. Burntisland Shipyard; 3. Coldstream; 4. **Girvan**; 5. Glasgow University; 6. Golspie Sutherland; 7. Linlithgow Rose; 8. Newton Stewart; 9. Preston Athletic; 10. St Cuthbert Wanderers; 11. **Threave Rovers** | 12. **Lothian Thistle Hutchison Vale** ^{(2016–17 EoSFL winners)}; 13. **Glenafton Athletic** ^{(2016–17 West Super League and Junior Cup winners)}; 14. Kelty Hearts ^{(2016–17 East Superleague winners)}; 15. **Colville Park** ^{(2016–17 Scottish Amateur Cup winners)} |

The following teams received a bye to the Second Preliminary Round: Banks O’Dee, Coldstream, Girvan, Glasgow University, Golspie Sutherland, Linlithgow Rose, Preston Athletic, St Cuthbert Wanderers and Threave Rovers.

==== Matches ====
| 12 August 2017 | Kelty Hearts | **0–1** | **Lothian Thistle Hutchison Vale** | Kelty |
| 14:30 | | Report | Muir 90' | Stadium: New Central Park; Referee: David Munro |

| 12 August 2017 | **Glenafton Athletic** | **6–0** | Newton Stewart | New Cumnock |
| 15:00 | Dallas 6', 42' (pen.); Gray 13'; Marlow 54'; McAusland 68'; McChesney 76' | Report | | Stadium: Loch Park; Referee: Stephen Brown |

| 12 August 2017 | Burntisland Shipyard | **0–7** | **Colville Park** | Burntisland |
| 15:00 | | Report | McGloughlin 2', 24'; Craig 55', 78', 90'; Murray 63'; Miller 84' | Stadium: Recreation Park; Referee: Craig Wilson |

=== Preliminary round two ===
==== Matches ====
| 2 September 2017 | **Banks O’Dee** | **2–1** | Linlithgow Rose | Aberdeen |
| 15:00 | Henderson 20'; Watt 60' | Report | Allan 61' (o.g.) | Stadium: Spain Park; Referee: David Dickinson |

| 2 September 2017 | Glasgow University | **1–1** | Threave Rovers | Airdrie |
| 15:00 | Thomson 30' | Report | Soltys 50' | Stadium: Excelsior Stadium; Referee: Scott Millar |

| 2 September 2017 | **Colville Park** | **5–0** | Preston Athletic | Glasgow |
| 15:00 | Cusack 10', 65'; Craig 75', 79'; Clearie 88' | Report | | Stadium: New Tinto Park; Referee: Scott Lambie |

| 2 September 2017 | **Lothian Thistle Hutchison Vale** | **4–0** | Coldstream | Edinburgh |
| 15:00 | Brown 20'; Devlin 41', 63'; O'Donnell 57' | Report | | Stadium: Saughton Enclosure; Referee: Chris Graham |

| 2 September 2017 | **Glenafton Athletic** | **6–1** | Golspie Sutherland | New Cumnock |
| 15:00 | Dallas 40', 57', 71'; Gray 49'; McKernon 75'; McCann 85' | Report | Lynnas 16' (o.g.) | Stadium: Loch Park; Referee: Tony Fullerton |

| 2 September 2017 | St Cuthbert Wanderers | **3–5** | **Girvan** | Kirkcudbright |
| 15:00 | Donley 1'; Dougan 63'; Cannon 76' | Report | Patterson 9' (pen.); Cameron 28'; Mitchell 38'; Reilly 57', 85' | Stadium: St Mary's Park; Referee: Lloyd Wilson |

==== Replay ====
| 9 September 2017 | **Threave Rovers** | **2–1** | Glasgow University | Castle Douglas |
| 15:00 | Soltys 51', 58' | Report | Thompson 75' (pen.) | Stadium: Meadow Park; Referee: Stephen Brown |

== First round ==
The first round took place on the weekend of 23 September 2017. Along with the six winners from the second preliminary round, there were 30 new entries at this stage, 14 from the Lowland Football League and 16 from the Highland Football League.

=== Draw ===
The draw for the first round was made at 5:30 pm on 2 September 2017 at the Excelsior Stadium, Airdrie and was made by Davie Hay, representing defending champions Celtic and Donnie Fergusson from hosts Glasgow University.

Teams in Italics were not known at the time of the draw. Teams in Bold advanced to the second round.

| Lowland Football League | Highland Football League | Other |
|---|---|---|
| **BSC Glasgow**; **Civil Service Strollers**; Cumbernauld Colts; Dalbeattie Star; **Edinburgh University**; **Edusport Academy**; Gala Fairydean Rovers; Gretna 2008; Hawick Royal Albert; **Selkirk**; **Spartans**; **Stirling University**; Vale of Leithen; Whitehill Welfare | **Brora Rangers**; **Clachnacuddin**; **Deveronvale**; **Formartine United**; Forres Mechanics; Fort William; **Fraserburgh**; Huntly; Inverurie Loco Works; **Keith**; Lossiemouth; **Nairn County**; Rothes; Strathspey Thistle; Turriff United; Wick Academy | East of Scotland teams: **Lothian Thistle Hutchison Vale**; South of Scotland teams: Threave Rovers; SJFA teams: **Banks O'Dee**; Girvan; **Glenafton Athletic**; SAFA teams: **Colville Park** |

=== Matches ===
| 22 September 2017 | **Spartans** | **3–0** | Vale of Leithen | Edinburgh |
| 19:45 | Dishington 28', 64'; Stevenson 89' | Report | | Stadium: Ainslie Park; Attendance: 192; Referee: Connor Ashwood |

| 23 September 2017 | Wick Academy | **2–2** | Stirling University | Wick |
| 15:00 | Mackay 67'; Steven 84' | Report | Geddes 58'; McCafferty 75' | Stadium: Harmsworth Park; Referee: Harry Bruce |

| 23 September 2017 | **Selkirk** | **4–0** | Gretna 2008 | Selkirk |
| 15:00 | Baxter 18'; Hopkinson 80', 82'; Chalmers 87' | Report | | Stadium: Yarrow Park; Referee: Stewart Luke |

| 23 September 2017 | Edusport Academy | **1–1** | Rothes | Annan |
| 15:00 | Higgins 49' | Report | Gillespie 52' (pen.) | Stadium: Galabank; Referee: Garry Doherty |

| 23 September 2017 | **Banks O'Dee** | **4–0** | Huntly | Aberdeen |
| 15:00 | Watt 12', 23'; Winton 32'; Philipson 55' | Report | | Stadium: Spain Park; Referee: Liam Duncan |

| 23 September 2017 | Gala Fairydean Rovers | **0–2** | **Keith** | Galashiels |
| 15:00 | | Report | Brownie 31'; Whelan 38' | Stadium: Netherdale; Referee: Ryan Oliver |

| 23 September 2017 | **Fraserburgh** | **2–1** | Forres Mechanics | Fraserburgh |
| 15:00 | Combe 71'; Campbell 90' | | Duncanson 20' | Stadium: Bellslea Park; Referee: Peter Stuart |

| 23 September 2017 | **Lothian Thistle Hutchison Vale** | **3–2** | Inverurie Loco Works | Edinburgh |
| 15:00 | McCabe 24'; Wringe 28'; Nhamburo 89' | Report | Laing 41'; Gordon 84' | Stadium: Saughton Enclosure; Referee: Chris Gentles |

| 23 September 2017 | **Edinburgh University** | **2–1** | Lossiemouth | Edinburgh |
| 15:00 | Yeoman 50'; Guthrie 84' | Report | McRitchie 17' | Stadium: East Peffermill; Referee: Scott Lambie |

| 23 September 2017 | **Clachnacuddin** | **8–0** | Fort William | Inverness |
| 15:00 | 10', 12', 17', 30', 55', 65', 85', 88' | Report | | Stadium: Grant Street Park; Referee: Matthew MacDermid |

| 23 September 2017 | **Glenafton Athletic** | **4–0** | Threave Rovers | New Cumnock |
| 15:00 | McCann 7', 36'; Andrew 60'; Moore 80' | Report | | Stadium: Loch Park; Referee: Duncan Smith |

| 23 September 2017 | **Brora Rangers** | **5–0** | Girvan | Brora |
| 15:00 | 31', 34', 37', 45', 65' | Report | | Stadium: Dudgeon Park; Referee: Alex Shepherd |

| 23 September 2017 | **Nairn County** | **1–0** | Whitehill Welfare | Nairn |
| 15:00 | MacRae 40' | Report | | Stadium: Station Park; Referee: Chris Fordyce |

| 23 September 2017 | **Colville Park** | **2–1** | Cumbernauld Colts | Glasgow |
| 15:00 | Craig 3'; Cusack 18' | Report | Brown 21' | Stadium: New Tinto Park; Referee: Chris McNab |

| 23 September 2017 | **Deveronvale** | **3–1** | Hawick Royal Albert | Banff |
| 15:00 | Scott 30', 79'; Dunbar 69' | Report | Aitken 42' (o.g.) | Stadium: Princess Royal Park; Referee: Dan McFarlane |

| 23 September 2017 | **Formartine United** | **2–1** | Turriff United | Pitmedden |
| 15:00 | Smith 33'; McPhee 87' | Report | Miller 5' | Stadium: North Lodge Park; Referee: Lorraine Watson |

| 23 September 2017 | **Civil Service Strollers** | **2–1** | Strathspey Thistle | Edinburgh |
| 15:00 | Stewart 56'; Churchill 75' | Report | Hay 35' | Stadium: Christie Gillies Park; Referee: Ross Hardie |

| 24 September 2017 | **BSC Glasgow** | **1–0** | Dalbeattie Star | Alloa |
| 14:00 | Redpath 67' | Report | | Stadium: Recreation Park; Referee: Kevin Graham |

=== Replays ===
| 30 September 2017 | **Stirling University** | **1–0** | Wick Academy | Falkirk |
| 15:00 | O'Brien 1' | Report | | Stadium: Falkirk Stadium |

| 30 September 2017 | Rothes | **1–3** | **Edusport Academy** | Rothes |
| 15:00 | Moore 22' | Report | Babel 65'; Zeghdane 79', 86' | Stadium: Mackessack Park; Referee: Garry Doherty |

== Second round ==
The second round took place on the weekend of 14 October 2017. Along with the 18 winners from the first round, there were 14 new entries at this stage, two from the Lowland Football League, two from the Highland Football League and all 10 from League Two.

=== Draw ===
The draw for the second round was made at 17:45 on 23 September 2017 at Ayr Racecourse. The draw was made by former England cricket captain Andrew Flintoff and former Ayr United striker James Grady.

Teams in Italics were not known at the time of the draw. Teams in Bold advanced to the third round.

| Scottish League Two | Lowland Football League | Highland Football League | Other |
|---|---|---|---|
| Annan Athletic; **Berwick Rangers**; **Clyde**; Cowdenbeath; Edinburgh City; **Elgin City**; **Montrose**; **Peterhead**; **Stenhousemuir**; Stirling Albion | BSC Glasgow; Civil Service Strollers; **East Kilbride**; East Stirlingshire; Edinburgh University; Edusport Academy; Selkirk; **Spartans**; Stirling University | **Brora Rangers**; **Buckie Thistle**; Clachnacuddin; **Cove Rangers**; Deveronvale; **Formartine United**; **Fraserburgh**; Keith; Nairn County | East of Scotland teams: **Lothian Thistle Hutchison Vale**; SJFA teams: **Banks O'Dee**; **Glenafton Athletic**; SAFA teams: Colville Park |

=== Matches ===
| 13 October 2017 | Edinburgh City | **0–1** | **Stenhousemuir** | Edinburgh |
| 19:45 | | Report | Longworth 49' | Stadium: Ainslie Park; Attendance: 286 |

| 14 October 2017 | **Banks O' Dee** | **2–0** | Selkirk | Aberdeen |
| 15:00 | Watt 68'; Whyte 75' | Report | | Stadium: Spain Park; Attendance: 200 |

| 14 October 2017 | **Peterhead** | **9–0** | Colville Park | Peterhead |
| 15:00 | J Brown 14'; Leitch 22'; McAllister 36', 39', 45+5' (pen.), 74' (pen.), 90'; Currie 58' (o.g.); S Brown 77' | Report | | Stadium: Balmoor Stadium; Attendance: 484 |

| 14 October 2017 | Civil Service Strollers | **0–5** | **Brora Rangers** | Edinburgh |
| 15:00 | | Report | Graham 35', 67'; MacDonald 49'; S Mackay 60'; Brindle 90+2' | Stadium: Christie Gillies Park; Attendance: 60 |

| 14 October 2017 | Deveronvale | **0–2** | **Glenafton Athletic** | Banff |
| 15:00 | | Report | Andrew 87', 90+1' | Stadium: Princess Royal Park; Attendance: 294 |

| 14 October 2017 | Keith | **0–3** | **Clyde** | Keith |
| 15:00 | | Report | Osadolor 47'; Wright 72'; Ramsay 79' | Stadium: Kynoch Park; Attendance: 170 |

| 14 October 2017 | **Berwick Rangers** | **1–0** | Annan Athletic | Berwick-upon-Tweed, England |
| 15:00 | Scullion 70' | Report | | Stadium: Shielfield Park; Attendance: 379 |

| 14 October 2017 | **Spartans** | **5–0** | Clachnacuddin | Edinburgh |
| 15:00 | Atkinson 4'; Greenhill 14', 33'; Dishington 71', 89' | Report | | Stadium: Ainslie Park; Attendance: 209 |

| 14 October 2017 | Stirling Albion | **3–5** | **Lothian Thistle Hutchison Vale** | Stirling |
| 15:00 | D Smith 6'; MacDonald 74'; Davidson 82' | Report | Hare 10'; Wringe 15', 47'; Swanson 66' (pen.); Devlin 68' | Stadium: Forthbank Stadium; Attendance: 521 |

| 14 October 2017 | **Elgin City** | **3–1** | Edusport Academy | Elgin |
| 15:00 | Cameron 7'; McHardy 88'; Sutherland 90+3' | Report | Babel 89' | Stadium: Borough Briggs; Attendance: 552 |

| 14 October 2017 | Nairn County | **1–2** | **Cove Rangers** | Nairn |
| 15:00 | MacRae 73' | Report | Megginson 18'; Masson 46' | Stadium: Station Park; Attendance: 185 |

| 14 October 2017 | **Montrose** | **4–1** | Stirling University | Montrose |
| 15:00 | Johnston 12', 20'; Campbell 57'; Fraser 78' | Report | O'Brien 35' | Stadium: Links Park; Attendance: 503 |

| 14 October 2017 | Cowdenbeath | **0–1** | **East Kilbride** | Cowdenbeath |
| 15:00 | | Report | Winter 86' | Stadium: Central Park; Attendance: 251 |

| 14 October 2017 | **Formartine United** | **4–0** | East Stirlingshire | Pitmedden |
| 15:00 | Ferries 14'; Barbour 15', 80'; Macphee 82' | Report | | Stadium: North Lodge Park; Attendance: 180 |

| 14 October 2017 | **Buckie Thistle** | **6–2** | BSC Glasgow | Buckie |
| 15:00 | | | | Stadium: Victoria Park |

| 14 October 2017 | Edinburgh University | **0–2** | **Fraserburgh** | Edinburgh |
| 15:00 | | Report | Barbour 8', 25' | Stadium: East Peffermill; Attendance: 180 |

== Third round ==
The third round took take place on the weekend of 18 November 2017. Along with the 16 winners from the first round, there were 16 new entries at this stage, all 10 from League One and six from the Championship.

=== Draw ===
The draw for the third round was made at 5:45pm on Saturday 14 October 2017 at Links Park, Montrose. The draw was made by Archie Knox and Derek Sim, chairman of Links Park Community Trust. The draw had to be re-done following a mix-up that lead to Brora Rangers being drawn twice. Of the 16 ties, 15 had already been drawn, including Glenafton Athletic-Queen of the South and Brora Rangers-Queen's Park, before the mistake was discovered. The Scottish Football Association claimed that the draw had to be re-done due to "a technical issue" in incident mirroring the 2016 quarter-final draw where when one of the balls containing the club names split open before it was pulled out.

Teams in Bold advanced to the fourth round.

| Scottish Championship | Scottish League One | Scottish League Two | Other |
|---|---|---|---|
| **Brechin City**; **Dumbarton**; **Dunfermline Athletic**; **Livingston**; **Queen of the South**; **St Mirren** | Airdrieonians; **Albion Rovers**; **Alloa Athletic**; **Arbroath**; **Ayr United**; **East Fife**; Forfar Athletic; Queen's Park; Raith Rovers; Stranraer | Berwick Rangers; Clyde; Elgin City; Montrose; **Peterhead**; Stenhousemuir | Lowland Football League: East Kilbride; Spartans; Highland Football League: **Brora Rangers**; Buckie Thistle; **Cove Rangers**; **Formartine United**; **Fraserburgh**; East of Scotland teams: Lothian Thistle Hutchison Vale; SJFA teams: Banks O' Dee; Glenafton Athletic |

=== Matches ===
| 18 November 2017 | Airdrieonians | **2–3** | **Cove Rangers** | Airdrie |
| 15:00 | McGregor 33'; Hastie 49' | | Milne 36', 89'; Ross 86' | Stadium: Excelsior Stadium; Attendance: 439; Referee: Steven Reid |

| 18 November 2017 | **Arbroath** | **3–0** | Berwick Rangers | Arbroath |
| 15:00 | Hamilton 16'; McIntosh 36', 70' | | | Stadium: Gayfield Park; Attendance: 536; Referee: Stephen Finnie |

| 18 November 2017 | Banks O'Dee | **2–6** | **Ayr United** | Aberdeen |
| 15:00 | Watt 9' (pen.), 26' (pen.) | | Shankland 1', 37'; McDaid 43', 45+1'; Moore 63', 66' | Stadium: Spain Park; Attendance: 469; Referee: Craig Napier |

| 18 November 2017 | Buckie Thistle | **2–3** | **Brechin City** | Buckie |
| 15:00 | McLeod 3', 43' | | Sinclair 22'; Layne 59', 86' | Stadium: Victoria Park; Attendance: 295; Referee: Grant Irvine |

| 18 November 2017 | Clyde | **0–2** | **East Fife** | Cumbernauld |
| 15:00 | | | Smith 32'; Page 67' | Stadium: Broadwood Stadium; Attendance: 527; Referee: David Munro |

| 18 November 2017 | **Dumbarton** | **1–0** | Elgin City | Dumbarton |
| 15:00 | Carswell 24' | | | Stadium: Dumbarton Football Stadium; Attendance: 491; Referee: Colin Steven |

| 18 November 2017 | East Kilbride | **3–4** | **Albion Rovers** | East Kilbride |
| 15:00 | McNeil 6', 63'; Howie 90+3' | | Howie 23' (o.g.); Fisher 47'; Victoria 54'; Trouten 61' | Stadium: K-Park Training Academy; Attendance: 300; Referee: David Dickinson |

| 18 November 2017 | **Formartine United** | **1–0** | Forfar Athletic | Pitmedden |
| 15:00 | Crawford 15' | | | Stadium: North Lodge Park; Attendance: 244; Referee: Mike Roncone |

| 18 November 2017 | **Livingston** | **2–0** | Glenafton Athletic | Livingston |
| 15:00 | Mackin 20', 61' | | | Stadium: Almondvale Stadium; Attendance: 735; Referee: Alan Newlands |

| 18 November 2017 | Lothian Thistle Hutchison Vale | **1–7** | **St Mirren** | Edinburgh |
| 13:00 | Wringe 47' | | Morgan 4'; Reilly 8', 32', 36', 42'; Baird 17'; C. Smith 24' | Stadium: Saughton Enclosure; Attendance: 1,322; Referee: David Lowe |

| 18 November 2017 | Montrose | **0–0** | Queen of the South | Montrose |
| 15:00 | | | | Stadium: Links Park; Attendance: 512; Referee: John McKendrick |

| 18 November 2017 | **Peterhead** | **3–0** | Raith Rovers | Peterhead |
| 15:00 | J. Brown 55'; McAllister 57', 85' | | | Stadium: Balmoor Stadium; Attendance: 671; Referee: Mat Northcroft |

| 18 November 2017 | Queen's Park | **1–4** | **Dunfermline Athletic** | Glasgow |
| 15:00 | Galt 65' | | Clark 48'; Talbot 59'; Ryan 78'; McManus 89' | Stadium: Hampden Park; Attendance: 1,179; Referee: Steven McLean |

| 18 November 2017 | Spartans | **1–2** | **Fraserburgh** | Edinburgh |
| 15:00 | Dishington 17' | | Campbell 47' (pen.); Hay 89' | Stadium: Ainslie Park; Attendance: 335; Referee: Lloyd Wilson |

| 18 November 2017 | Stenhousemuir | **1–2** | **Alloa Athletic** | Stenhousemuir |
| 15:00 | Paterson 27' | | Malcolm 50', 67' | Stadium: Ochilview Park; Attendance: Kevin Clancy; Referee: 400 |

| 18 November 2017 | Stranraer | **0–1** | **Brora Rangers** | Stranraer |
| 15:00 | | | S. Mackay 90+3' | Stadium: Stair Park; Attendance: 440; Referee: Barry Cook |

=== Replay ===
| 21 November 2017 | **Queen of the South** | **2–1** | Montrose | Dumfries |
| 19:45 | Dobbie 24'; Lyle 67' | | Webster 43' | Stadium: Palmerston Park; Attendance: 794; Referee: John McKendrick |

== Fourth round ==
The fourth round took place on the weekend of 20 January 2018. Along with the 16 winners from the third round, there were 16 new entries at this stage - the remaining four clubs from the Championship, and all 12 from the Premiership.

=== Draw ===
The draw for the fourth round was made at 4:45pm on Monday, 20 November 2017. The draw was made by Doddie Weir and Colin Cameron.

Teams in Bold advanced to the fifth round.

| Scottish Premiership | Scottish Championship | Scottish League One | Scottish League Two | Highland Football League |
|---|---|---|---|---|
| **Aberdeen**; **Celtic**; **Dundee**; Hamilton Academical; **Heart of Midlothian**; Hibernian; **Kilmarnock**; **Motherwell**; **Partick Thistle**; **Rangers**; Ross County; **St Johnstone** | Brechin City; **Dumbarton**; **Dundee United**; Dunfermline Athletic; **Falkirk**; **Greenock Morton**; Inverness Caledonian Thistle; Livingston; Queen of the South; St Mirren | Albion Rovers; Alloa Athletic; Arbroath; **Ayr United**; East Fife | Peterhead | **Brora Rangers**; **Cove Rangers**; Formartine United; Fraserburgh |

=== Matches ===
| 20 January 2018 | **Aberdeen** | **4–1** | St Mirren | Aberdeen |
| 12:15 | Rooney 8' (pen.); Christie 18', 33'; Mackay-Steven 47' | Report | Reilly 25' | Stadium: Pittodrie Stadium; Attendance: 9,848; Referee: Don Robertson |

| 20 January 2018 | Alloa Athletic | **0–2** | **Dundee United** | Alloa |
| 15:00 | | Report | Durnan 44'; Lyng 62' | Stadium: Recreation Park; Attendance: 1,615; Referee: Craig Charleston |

| 20 January 2018 | **Ayr United** | **4–1** | Arbroath | Ayr |
| 15:00 | McDaid 9', 83'; Shankland 58'; Moore 90+3' | Report | McCord 79' | Stadium: Somerset Park; Attendance: 1,151; Referee: Mike Roncone |

| 20 January 2018 | **Celtic** | **5–0** | Brechin City | Glasgow |
| 15:00 | Forrest 2'; Sinclair 11'; Ntcham 49'; Boyata 56'; Édouard 86' | Report | | Stadium: Celtic Park; Attendance: 24,879; Referee: Steven McLean |

| 20 January 2018 | Dundee | **2–2** | Inverness Caledonian Thistle | Dundee |
| 15:00 | Leitch-Smith 47'; O'Hara 64' | Report | Doran 16'; Oakley 87' | Stadium: Dens Park; Attendance: 3,507; Referee: Stephen Finnie |

| 20 January 2018 | Dunfermline Athletic | **1–2** | **Greenock Morton** | Dunfermline |
| 15:00 | McManus 57' | Report | Oliver 24'; Quitongo 85' | Stadium: East End Park; Attendance: 2,573; Referee: Alan Muir |

| 20 January 2018 | East Fife | **0–1** | **Brora Rangers** | Methil |
| 15:00 | | Report | Williamson 12' | Stadium: Bayview Stadium; Attendance: 685; Referee: David Munro |

| 20 January 2018 | **Kilmarnock** | **1–0** | Ross County | Kilmarnock |
| 15:00 | Erwin 88' (pen.) | Report | | Stadium: Rugby Park; Attendance: 3,595; Referee: Bobby Madden |

| 20 January 2018 | **Motherwell** | **2–0** | Hamilton Academical | Motherwell |
| 15:00 | McMann 4' (o.g.); Tanner 35' (pen.) | Report | | Stadium: Fir Park; Attendance: 4,725; Referee: Craig Thomson |

| 20 January 2018 | Queen of the South | **1–2** | **Partick Thistle** | Dumfries |
| 15:00 | Fergusson 55' | Report | Sammon 42', 81' | Stadium: Palmerston Park; Attendance: 2,338; Referee: Willie Collum |

| 21 January 2018 | **Heart of Midlothian** | **1–0** | Hibernian | Edinburgh |
| 14:05 | Cowie 87' | Report | | Stadium: Tynecastle Park; Attendance: 18,709; Referee: Kevin Clancy |

| 23 January 2018 | Livingston | **0–1** | **Falkirk** | Livingston |
| 19:45 | | Report | Tumilty 90+3' | Stadium: Almondvale; Attendance: 1,237; Referee: Alan Newlands |

| 23 January 2018 | Peterhead | **2–3** | **Dumbarton** | Peterhead |
| 19:45 | J. Brown 31'; Robertson 83' | Report | Gallagher 12', 53'; Russell 56' | Stadium: Balmoor Stadium; Attendance: 691; Referee: Gavin Ross |

| 29 January 2018 | Albion Rovers | **0–4** | **St Johnstone** | Coatbridge |
| 19:45 | | Report | Kane 3', 57', 70'; McClean 51' | Stadium: Cliftonhill; Attendance: 1,130; Referee: Mat Northcroft |

| 30 January 2018 | Formartine United | **0–2** | **Cove Rangers** | Pitmedden |
| 20:00 | | Report | Stott 32'; Megginson 68' | Stadium: North Lodge Park; Attendance: 776; Referee: Gavin Duncan |

| 31 January 2018 | Fraserburgh | **0–3** | **Rangers** | Fraserburgh |
| 19:30 | | Report | Windass 15' (pen.), 55', 67' | Stadium: Bellslea Park; Referee: Greg Aitken |

=== Replay ===
| 30 January 2018 | Inverness Caledonian Thistle | **0–1** | **Dundee** | Inverness |
| 19:45 | | Report | Allan 47' | Stadium: Caledonian Stadium; Attendance: 1,746; Referee: Stephen Finnie |

== Fifth round ==
The draw for the fifth round was made live on Sky Sports Football at Tynecastle Park following Heart of Midlothian's Edinburgh derby victory on Sunday, 21 January 2018. The draw was made by Amy MacDonald and David Weir.

=== Draw ===
Teams in italics were not known at the time of the draw. Teams in Bold advanced to the quarter-finals.

| Scottish Premiership | Scottish Championship | Scottish League One | Highland Football League |
|---|---|---|---|
| **Aberdeen**; **Celtic**; Dundee; **Heart of Midlothian**; **Kilmarnock**; **Motherwell**; Partick Thistle; **Rangers**; St Johnstone | Dumbarton; Dundee United; **Falkirk**; **Greenock Morton** | Ayr United | Brora Rangers; Cove Rangers |

=== Matches ===
| 10 February 2018 | **Celtic** | **3–2** | Partick Thistle | Glasgow |
| 12:15 | Forrest 3', 10', 54' | Report | Doolan 20'; Sammon 84' | Stadium: Celtic Park; Attendance: 24,191; Referee: Steven McLean |

| 10 February 2018 | Cove Rangers | **1–3** | **Falkirk** | Inverurie |
| 15:00 | Megginson 3' | Report | Jakubiak 2', 48'; Sibbald 46' | Stadium: Harlaw Park; Attendance: 1,687; Referee: Alan Muir |

| 10 February 2018 | Dundee | **0–2** | **Motherwell** | Dundee |
| 15:00 | | Report | Tanner 30'; Main 56' | Stadium: Dens Park; Attendance: 4,663; Referee: Bobby Madden |

| 10 February 2018 | **Greenock Morton** | **3–0** | Dumbarton | Greenock |
| 15:00 | Ross 12'; Iredale 49'; McHugh 80' | Report | | Stadium: Cappielow; Attendance: 1,746; Referee: Craig Thomson |

| 10 February 2018 | **Heart of Midlothian** | **3–0** | St Johnstone | Edinburgh |
| 15:00 | Lafferty 7', 58'; Mitchell 54' | Report | | Stadium: Tynecastle Park; Attendance: 12,393; Referee: Kevin Clancy |

| 10 February 2018 | **Kilmarnock** | **4–0** | Brora Rangers | Kilmarnock |
| 15:00 | Tshibola 42'; Boyd 58'; Brophy 76'; O'Donnell 82' | Report | | Stadium: Rugby Park; Attendance: 4,278; Referee: Euan Anderson |

| 11 February 2018 | Ayr United | **1–6** | **Rangers** | Ayr |
| 14:30 | Forrest 11' | Report | Morelos 31', 72'; Cummings 66'; Windass 69', 81'; Murphy 88' | Stadium: Somerset Park; Attendance: 9,346; Referee: Nick Walsh |

| 11 February 2018 | **Aberdeen** | **4–2** | Dundee United | Aberdeen |
| 16:30 | Rooney 20'; Mackay-Steven 27', 55'; McLean 35' | Report | Stanton 34'; McMullan 70' | Stadium: Pittodrie Stadium; Attendance: 11,611; Referee: Willie Collum |

== Quarter-finals ==
The draw for the quarter-finals was made live on Sky Sports Football at Pittodrie Stadium following Aberdeen's tie against Dundee United on Sunday, 11 February 2018. The draw was made by Russell Anderson and Rachel Corsie.

=== Draw ===
Teams in Bold advanced to the semi-finals.

| Scottish Premiership | Scottish Championship |
|---|---|
| **Aberdeen**; **Celtic**; Heart of Midlothian; Kilmarnock; **Motherwell**; **Rangers** | Falkirk; Greenock Morton |

=== Matches ===
| 3 March 2018 | **Celtic** | **3–0** | Greenock Morton | Glasgow |
| 12:30 | Dembélé 62', 71' (pen.); Édouard 90' | Report | | Stadium: Celtic Park; Attendance: 18,255; Referee: John Beaton |

| 3 March 2018 | Aberdeen | **1–1** | Kilmarnock | Aberdeen |
| 15:00 | Shinnie 9' | Report | Boyd 68' (pen.) | Stadium: Pittodrie Stadium; Attendance: 8,739; Referee: Steven McLean |

| 4 March 2018 | **Motherwell** | **2–1** | Heart of Midlothian | Motherwell |
| 14:15 | Main 7'; McHugh 87' | Report | Lafferty 51' (pen.) | Stadium: Fir Park; Attendance: 7,564; Referee: Andrew Dallas |

| 4 March 2018 | **Rangers** | **4–1** | Falkirk | Glasgow |
| 16:15 | Cummings 16', 21', 75'; Muirhead 44' (o.g.) | Report | Muirhead 20' | Stadium: Ibrox Stadium; Attendance: 33,968; Referee: Craig Thomson |

=== Replay ===
| 13 March 2018 | Kilmarnock | **1–1** (a.e.t.) (**2–3** p) | **Aberdeen** | Kilmarnock |
| 19:45 | O'Donnell 96' | Report | McLean 103' (pen.) | Stadium: Rugby Park; Attendance: 8,998; Referee: Steven McLean |
| | **Penalties** |
| | Erwin (penalty scored); Brophy (penalty missed); Taylor (penalty missed); O'Donnell (penalty scored); Kiltie (penalty missed) | | (penalty scored) Shinnie; (penalty scored) McLean; (penalty missed) McGinn; (penalty scored) Stewart |

== Semi-finals ==
The draw for the semi-finals was made live on Sky Sports Football at Ibrox Stadium following Rangers' tie against Falkirk on Sunday, 4 March 2018. The draw was made by Neil Alexander and Gordon Reid.

=== Draw ===
Teams in italics were not known at the time of the draw. Teams in Bold advanced to the final.

Scottish Premiership
- Aberdeen
- **Celtic**
- **Motherwell**
- Rangers

=== Matches ===
| 14 April 2018 | **Motherwell** | **3–0** | Aberdeen | Glasgow |
| 12:15 | Main 20', 66'; Bowman 22' | Report | | Stadium: Hampden Park; Attendance: 18,470; Referee: Kevin Clancy |

| 15 April 2018 | **Celtic** | **4–0** | Rangers | Glasgow |
| 14:30 | Rogic 22'; McGregor 38'; Dembélé 52' (pen.); Ntcham 78' (pen.) | Report | | Stadium: Hampden Park; Attendance: 49,729; Referee: Bobby Madden |

== Final ==
19 May 2018
15:00

| Celtic | 2–0 | Motherwell |
|---|---|---|
| McGregor 11'; Ntcham 25' | Report |

Hampden Park, Glasgow
Attendance: 49,967
Referee: Kevin Clancy

== Bracket ==
The following is the bracket which the Scottish Cup resembled. Numbers in parentheses next to the match score represent the results of a replay.

**Fourth round** 20–21 January 2018; 30 January 2018 (replay)
**Celtic** | **5**
Brechin City | 0
Queen of the South | 1
**Partick Thistle** | **2**
Dunfermline Athletic | 1
**Greenock Morton** | **2**
Peterhead | 2
**Dumbarton** | **3**
**Ayr United** | **4**
Arbroath | 1
Fraserburgh | 0
**Rangers** | **3**
Formartine United | 0
**Cove Rangers** | **2**
Livingston | 0
**Falkirk** | **1**
**Dundee** | **2 (1)**
Inverness Caledonian Thistle | 2 (0)
**Motherwell** | **2**
Hamilton Academical | 0
**Heart of Midlothian** | **1**
Hibernian | 0
Albion Rovers | 0
**St Johnstone** | **4**
**Kilmarnock** | **1**
Ross County | 0
East Fife | 0
**Brora Rangers** | **1**
**Aberdeen** | **4**
St Mirren | 1
Alloa Athletic | 0
**Dundee United** | **1**

**Fifth round** 10–11 February 2018
**Celtic** | **3**
Partick Thistle | 2
**Greenock Morton** | **3**
Dumbarton | 0
Ayr United | 1
**Rangers** | **6**
Cove Rangers | 1
**Falkirk** | **3**
Dundee | 0
**Motherwell** | **2**
**Heart of Midlothian** | **3**
St Johnstone | 0
**Kilmarnock** | **4**
Brora Rangers | 0
**Aberdeen** | **4**
Dundee United | 2

**Quarter-finals**; 3–4 March 2018; 13 March 2018 (replay)
**Celtic** | **3**
Greenock Morton | 0
**Rangers** | **4**
Falkirk | 1
**Motherwell** | **2**
Heart of Midlothian | 1
Kilmarnock | 1 (1) (2)
**Aberdeen (a.e.t.)** | **1 (1) (3p)**

**Semi-finals**; 14–15 April 2018
**Celtic** | **4**
Rangers | 0
**Motherwell** | **3**
Aberdeen | 0

**Final**; 19 May 2018
**Celtic** | **2**
Motherwell | 0

== Media coverage ==
From round four onwards, selected matches from the Scottish Cup are broadcast live in the UK and Ireland by BBC Scotland and Sky Sports. BBC Scotland has the option to show one tie per round, with Sky Sports showing two ties per round with one replay; Sky Sports show both semi-finals live with one also on BBC Scotland, and both channels screen the final live.

The following matches are to be broadcast live on UK television:

| Round | BBC Scotland | Sky Sports |
|---|---|---|
| Fourth Round | Aberdeen v St Mirren | Fraserburgh v Rangers; Heart of Midlothian v Hibernian |
| Fifth Round | Celtic v Partick Thistle | Ayr United v Rangers; Aberdeen v Dundee United |
| Quarter-finals | Motherwell v Heart of Midlothian | Celtic v Greenock Morton; Rangers v Falkirk |
| Semi-finals | Motherwell v Aberdeen | Motherwell v Aberdeen; Celtic v Rangers |
| Final | Celtic v Motherwell | Celtic v Motherwell |
