= 2020–21 Lowland Football League =

Lowland League
- Season: 2020–21
- Dates: 10 October 2020 – 17 April 2021
- Champions: Kelty Hearts
- Promoted: Kelty Hearts
- Matches: 107
- Goals: 375 (3.5 per match)
- Top goalscorer: Jamie Penker (University of Stirling) (11 goals)
- Biggest home win: Caledonian Braves 9–0 Vale of Leithen (15 December 2020)
- Biggest away win: Edinburgh University 0–9 East Kilbride (19 December 2020)
- Highest scoring: Vale of Leithen 4–6 BSC Glasgow (17 October 2020)
- Longest winning run: 7 matches: Kelty Hearts
- Longest unbeaten run: 9 matches: East Kilbride
- Longest winless run: 12 matches: Vale of Leithen
- Longest losing run: 12 matches: Vale of Leithen

The 2020–21 Scottish Lowland Football League was the 8th season of the Lowland Football League, the fifth tier of the Scottish football pyramid system. Kelty Hearts were the reigning champions.

The league consisted of 17 teams as no clubs were relegated at the end of the 2019–20 season and East of Scotland champions Bo'ness United were promoted after gaining their SFA membership in June 2020.

The start of the league season was delayed until October 2020 because of the COVID-19 pandemic, and games were played behind closed doors due to Scottish Government restrictions. On 11 January 2021 the league was suspended by the Scottish Football Association due to the escalating pandemic situation. On 30 March the league announced that a majority of clubs had voted to curtail the season, with a points per game basis used to finalise standings and Kelty Hearts were declared as the champions.

They faced the winners of the 2020–21 Highland Football League (Brora Rangers) in the Pyramid play-off, winning 6–1 on aggregate. Kelty then defeated Brechin City 3–1 on aggregate in the League Two play-off final to gain a place in Scottish League Two.

== Teams ==
Location of teams in 2020–21 Scottish Lowland Football League

The following teams changed division after the 2019–20 season.

=== To Lowland League ===
Promoted from East of Scotland League

- Bo'ness United

=== Stadia and locations ===
Team	Location	Stadium	Capacity	Seats
Berwick Rangers	Berwick-upon-Tweed	Shielfield Park	4,099	1,366
Bo'ness United	Bo'ness	Newtown Park	2,500	0
Bonnyrigg Rose Athletic	Bonnyrigg	New Dundas Park	2,200	0
BSC Glasgow	Alloa	Recreation Park (Note: BSC Glasgow are ground-sharing with Alloa Athletic due to the lack of a suitable venue in Glasgow.)	3,100	919
Caledonian Braves	Motherwell	Alliance Park	500	100
Civil Service Strollers	Edinburgh	Christie Gillies Park	1,569	100
Cumbernauld Colts	Cumbernauld	Broadwood Stadium	7,936	7,936
Dalbeattie Star	Dalbeattie	Islecroft Stadium	1,320	100
East Kilbride	East Kilbride	K Park	660	400
East Stirlingshire	Falkirk	Falkirk Stadium (Note: East Stirlingshire are ground-sharing with Falkirk.)	7,937	7,937
Edinburgh University	Edinburgh	New Peffermill Stadium	1,100	100
Gala Fairydean Rovers	Galashiels	3G Arena, Netherdale	2,000	500
Gretna 2008	Gretna	Raydale Park	1,030	138
Kelty Hearts	Kelty	New Central Park	2,181	353
The Spartans	Edinburgh	Ainslie Park	3,612	534
University of Stirling	Stirling	Forthbank Stadium (Note: University of Stirling are ground-sharing with Stirling Albion.)	3,808	2,508
Vale of Leithen	Innerleithen	Victoria Park	1,500	0

Notes

All grounds are equipped with floodlights.

=== Personnel and kits ===
Team	Manager	Captain	Kit manufacturer	Shirt sponsor
Berwick Rangers	(Scotland) Ian Little	(Scotland) Euan Smith	Kappa	Thrive Learning
Bo'ness United	(Scotland) Max Christie	(Scotland) Chris Donnelly	Puma	Express Taxis
Bonnyrigg Rose Athletic	(Scotland) Robbie Horn	(Scotland) Jonathan Stewart	Puma	G. Fitzsimmons and Son
BSC Glasgow	(Scotland) Stephen Swift	(Scotland) Ross McMillan	Joma	Nicholson Accountancy
Caledonian Braves	(Scotland) Ricky Waddell	(Scotland) Alan Reid	Macron	Alba Cola
Civil Service Strollers	(Scotland) Gary Jardine	(Scotland) Mark McConnell	Legea	Futurity Financial Services
Cumbernauld Colts	(Scotland) Craig McKinlay	(Scotland) Stephen O'Neill	Uhlsport	Broden's Bar and Kitchen
Dalbeattie Star	(Scotland) Ritchie Maxwell	(Scotland) Lee Wells	Adidas	Solway Plant Hire
East Kilbride	(Scotland) Stephen Aitken	(Northern Ireland) Paul Paton	Joma	Document Solutions
East Stirlingshire	(Scotland) Derek Ure	(Scotland) Nicky Low	EV2 Sportswear	EV2SPORTSWEAR.COM
Edinburgh University	(Scotland) Dorian Ogunro	(Scotland) Calum McDonald	PlayerLayer	TWEDEX
Gala Fairydean Rovers	(Scotland) Neil Hastings	(Scotland) Danny Galbraith	Adidas	Five Star Taxis
Gretna 2008	(Scotland) Rowan Alexander	(Northern Ireland) Bryan Gilfillan	Joma	CASS
Kelty Hearts	(Scotland) Barry Ferguson	(Scotland) Michael Tidser	Joma	The Conservatory Converters
The Spartans	(Scotland) Douglas Samuel	(Scotland) Adam Corbett	Macron	Arthur McKay
Stirling University	(Scotland) Chris Geddes	(Scotland) Craig Brown	VSN	Mackay Clinic
Vale of Leithen	(Scotland) Chris Anderson	(Scotland) Ger Rossi	Adidas	BARC Travel

== League summary ==
=== League table ===
Pos	Team	Pld	W	D	L	GF	GA	GD	Pts	PPG	Promotion, qualification or relegation
1	Kelty Hearts (C, O, P)	13	12	0	1	40	4	+36	36	2.77	Qualification for the Pyramid play-off
2	East Kilbride	12	9	2	1	32	6	+26	29	2.42	
3	Bonnyrigg Rose Athletic	12	9	2	1	29	6	+23	29	2.42	
4	BSC Glasgow	13	9	3	1	38	16	+22	30	2.31	
5	East Stirlingshire	12	8	2	2	30	12	+18	26	2.17	
6	Gala Fairydean Rovers	12	7	1	4	22	20	+2	22	1.83	
7	Bo'ness United	10	5	3	2	22	13	+9	18	1.80	
8	The Spartans	12	6	0	6	27	22	+5	18	1.50	
9	University of Stirling	15	7	1	7	31	25	+6	22	1.47	
10	Berwick Rangers	13	5	1	7	12	16	−4	16	1.23	
11	Civil Service Strollers	14	4	5	5	14	16	−2	17	1.21	
12	Caledonian Braves	14	4	1	9	22	28	−6	13	0.93	
13	Gretna 2008	11	3	1	7	15	25	−10	10	0.91	
14	Cumbernauld Colts	14	3	2	9	17	30	−13	11	0.79	
15	Dalbeattie Star	10	1	2	7	12	24	−12	5	0.50	
16	Edinburgh University	15	1	2	12	7	54	−47	5	0.33	
17	Vale of Leithen	12	0	0	12	5	58	−53	0	0.00	

Source: SLFL BBC Sport Soccerway
Rules for classification: 1) Points; 2) Goal difference; 3) Number of goals scored
(C) Champions; (O) Play-off winners; (P) Promoted

=== Positions by round ===
Qualification for the Pyramid play-off
Possible relegation to Tier 6
Relegation to Tier 6

Team ╲ Round	1	2	3	4	5	6	7	8	9	10	11	12	13	14	15	16	17	18	19	20	21	22	23	24	25	26	27	28	29	30	31	32	33	34
Kelty Hearts	2	7	6	5	4	2	5	5	3	2	2	1	1	1	1	1	1	1																
BSC Glasgow	4	6	5	3	2	3	2	2	5	3	1	5	3	4	4	2	2	2																
East Kilbride	5	1	1	2	3	1	1	1	1	1	4	3	5	2	2	3	3	3																
Bonnyrigg Rose Athletic	1	2	3	4	5	6	7	7	7	4	3	2	2	3	3	4	4	4																
East Stirlingshire	8	4	4	6	6	4	3	4	2	5	5	4	4	5	5	5	5	5																
University of Stirling	13	8	7	7	7	7	8	9	8	8	8	6	6	7	6	6	6	6																
Gala Fairydean Rovers	17	10	10	10	9	9	6	6	6	7	7	9	7	6	7	7	7	7																
Bo'ness United	3	3	2	1	1	5	4	3	4	6	6	7	8	8	8	8	8	8																
The Spartans	6	5	9	8	10	10	11	10	11	10	9	8	9	9	9	9	9	9																
Civil Service Strollers	14	11	11	12	13	11	12	14	12	11	10	10	10	10	10	10	10	10																
Berwick Rangers	7	9	8	9	8	8	9	8	9	9	11	11	11	11	11	11	11	11																
Caledonian Braves	9	14	13	13	12	13	10	13	14	14	14	14	12	12	12	12	12	12																
Cumbernauld Colts	10	13	12	11	11	12	13	11	10	12	12	12	13	13	13	13	13	13																
Gretna 2008	12	16	16	16	15	16	15	12	13	13	13	13	14	14	14	14	14	14																
Dalbeattie Star	11	12	14	14	14	15	14	15	15	15	15	15	15	15	15	15	15	15																
Edinburgh University	16	17	17	17	17	14	16	16	16	16	16	16	16	16	16	16	16	16																
Vale of Leithen	15	15	15	15	16	17	17	17	17	17	17	17	17	17	17	17	17	17																

Updated to match(es) played on 5 January 2021. Source:

== Results ==
Home \ Away	BER	BNS	BON	BSC	CAL	CSS	CUM	DAL	EKB	EAS	EDU	GFR	GRE	KEL	SPA	STI	VOL
Berwick Rangers									0–1	1–3	3–1			0–4		3–2	1–0
Bo'ness United	2–1			4–4	2–0	1–1	2–1					1–2					4–0
Bonnyrigg Rose Athletic					2–0	2–0	1–1		2–1		3–0		3–0				5–0
BSC Glasgow	0–0				3–2		4–0	2–1		5–1					3–1	2–1	
Caledonian Braves	0–1					2–2		3–1					0–5	0–1		2–3	9–0
Civil Service Strollers	1–0			0–0							1–1		1–0	2–3		1–0	
Cumbernauld Colts	0–2				0–1	1–1					3–0	1–2		0–2	2–6	1–2	
Dalbeattie Star			1–3							0–4	0–0	2–3	2–2				
East Kilbride		1–1			4–1	2–0						3–0	6–1		2–0		
East Stirlingshire			2–1		3–0	1–0	2–3		0–0			2–2					
Edinburgh University		0–4		0–6	1–2				0–9	0–2			1–0		1–6		
Gala Fairydean Rovers			0–4	2–0		3–1					4–1			1–2	3–1		
Gretna 2008	1–0			0–3											1–2		5–0
Kelty Hearts							5–0	2–0	0–1		4–0		7–0			2–0	4–0
The Spartans	1–0		0–2					3–1						0–4		1–3	6–0
University of Stirling		3–1	1–1					2–4	1–2	0–3	7–1	2–0					4–1
Vale of Leithen				4–6		0–3	0–4			0–7							

Updated to match(es) played on 5 January 2021. Source: SLFL
Legend: Blue = home team win; Yellow = draw; Red = away team win.

== Top scorers ==
As of 5 January 2021

Rank	Player	Club	Goals
1	(Scotland) Jamie Penker	University of Stirling	11
2	(England) Nathan Austin	Kelty Hearts	10
3	(Scotland) Scott-Taylor Mackenzie	Gala Fairydean Rovers	8
3	(Scotland) Craig Malcolm	East Kilbride	8
3	(Scotland) Andy Rodgers	East Stirlingshire	8
6	(Scotland) Lee Currie	Bonnyrigg Rose Athletic	7
6	(Scotland) Jamie Glasgow	BSC Glasgow	7
6	(England) Kallum Higginbotham	Kelty Hearts	7
6	(Scotland) Zander Miller	Bo'ness United	7
10	(Scotland) Dylan Easton	Kelty Hearts	6
10	(Scotland) Ross Lyon	BSC Glasgow	6
10	(Scotland) Ross McNeil	Caledonian Braves	6

== Lowland League play-off ==
A three match round robin play-off was due to take place between the winners of the 2020–21 East of Scotland Football League, the 2020–21 South of Scotland Football League, and the 2020–21 West of Scotland Football League, subject to all three clubs meeting the required licensing criteria for promotion. However all three leagues were declared null and void so there was no play-off or promotion to the Lowland League.
