= 2013–14 Lowland Football League =

Lowland League
- Season: 2013–14
- Champions: Spartans
- Matches: 132
- Goals: 504 (3.82 per match)
- Top goalscorer: Keith McLeod (The Spartans) (17 goals)
- Biggest home win: The Spartans 11–2 Selkirk (7 December 2013)
- Biggest away win: Preston Athletic 2–9 Whitehill Welfare (19 October 2013)
- Highest scoring: Spartans 11–2 Selkirk (7 December 2013)

The 2013–14 Lowland League was the first season of the Lowland Football League. The league championship was won by Spartans. Despite being integrated into the pyramid system, it was agreed as part of league restructuring that the inaugural victor would not compete for a place in the SPFL.

== Teams ==
Location of teams in 2013–14 Scottish Lowland Football League

The following teams moved to the Lowland League for the inaugural season.

=== To Lowland League ===
Transferred from East of Scotland League Premier Division

- Edinburgh City
- Gretna 2008
- Preston Athletic
- The Spartans
- Stirling University
- Vale of Leithen
- Whitehill Welfare

Transferred from East of Scotland League First Division

- Gala Fairydean Rovers
- Selkirk

Transferred from South of Scotland League

- Dalbeattie Star
- Threave Rovers

Transferred from Scottish Amateur Football League

- East Kilbride

=== Stadia and Locations ===
Team	Location	Home ground	Capacity	Ref.
Dalbeattie Star	Dalbeattie	Islecroft Stadium	3,500	
East Kilbride	East Kilbride	K Park Training Academy	400	
Edinburgh City	Edinburgh	Meadowbank Stadium	16,500	
Gala Fairydean Rovers	Galashiels	Netherdale	4,000	
Gretna 2008	Gretna	Raydale Park	2,200	
Preston Athletic	Prestonpans	Pennypit Park	4,000	
Selkirk	Selkirk	Yarrow Park	1,162	
The Spartans	Edinburgh	Ainslie Park	3,000	
Stirling University	Stirling	Forthbank Stadium	3,808	
Threave Rovers	Castle Douglas	Meadow Park	1,500	
Vale of Leithen	Innerleithen	Victoria Park	1,500	
Whitehill Welfare	Rosewell	Ferguson Park	2,614	

== League table ==
Pos	Team	Pld	W	D	L	GF	GA	GD	Pts	Qualification
1	The Spartans (C)	22	15	4	3	57	16	+41	49	Qualification for 2014–15 Scottish Cup Second round
2	Stirling University	22	14	3	5	48	26	+22	45	Qualification for 2014–15 Scottish Cup Second round
3	Dalbeattie Star	22	11	7	4	59	34	+25	40	
4	Whitehill Welfare	22	12	3	7	56	36	+20	39	
5	Edinburgh City	22	12	1	9	49	32	+17	37	
6	Gretna 2008	22	8	7	7	40	33	+7	31	
7	Vale of Leithen	22	11	3	8	41	43	−2	30 (Note: Vale of Leithen were deducted 6 points for fielding more than permitted number of trialists in final two games.)	
8	East Kilbride	22	8	4	10	28	31	−3	28	
9	Preston Athletic	22	7	3	12	40	53	−13	24	
10	Gala Fairydean Rovers	22	7	2	13	46	63	−17	23	
11	Threave Rovers	22	4	5	13	22	53	−31	17	
12	Selkirk	22	1	2	19	20	86	−66	5	

Source: Soccerway
Rules for classification: 1) Points; 2) Goal difference; 3) Number of goals scored
(C) Champions

== Results ==
Home \ Away	DBS	EKB	EDC	GFR	G08	PRA	SEL	SPA	SLU	THR	VOL	WHW
Dalbeattie Star		2–0	0–1	4–1	1–1	3–3	9–1	2–2	3–3	0–0	4–0	1–5
East Kilbride	0–3		1–3	2–3	1–1	2–0	4–1	1–0	1–2	1–1	0–1	1–0
Edinburgh City	2–1	0–1		4–1	1–5	4–1	4–0	0–1	1–0	0–2	7–2	5–1
Gala Fairydean Rovers	1–4	0–1	3–3		2–6	1–4	6–3	0–3	1–4	4–0	2–3	3–0
Gretna 2008	3–3	3–2	2–1	1–2		1–1	5–0	0–3	0–1	0–3	2–3	1–1
Preston Athletic	3–4	1–2	2–1	5–2	0–2		3–1	2–1	1–3	3–0	1–2	2–9
Selkirk	2–4	0–3	1–3	0–3	0–4	1–3		0–3	1–5	1–1	1–3	3–6
The Spartans	1–1	0–0	1–0	2–1	4–0	4–0	11–2		2–1	4–0	1–1	2–0
Stirling University	0–1	2–1	3–1	2–2	0–0	3–2	3–0	3–2		2–0	4–1	0–2
Threave Rovers	1–4	1–0	0–5	4–5	0–1	2–2	0–0	1–3	1–4		2–1	2–5
Vale of Leithen	2–1	3–3	1–2	4–1	2–0	2–0	3–1	0–5	2–3	4–0		0–2
Whitehill Welfare	2–4	4–1	3–1	4–2	2–2	3–1	0–1	1–2	1–0	4–1	1–1	

Updated to match(es) played on 26 May 2014. Source: BBC Sport
Legend: Blue = home team win; Yellow = draw; Red = away team win.
