= Cumbernauld Colts F.C. =

Association football club in Scotland

Cumbernauld Colts
- Full name: Cumbernauld Colts Football Club
- Nickname: The Colts
- Founded: 1969
- Ground: Broadwood Stadium, Cumbernauld
- Capacity: 8,086
- Coordinates: 55.944673°N 4.037885°W
- Manager: John Doyle
- League: Lowland League West
- 2025–26: Lowland League, 6th of 18
- Website: http://www.cumbernauldcoltsfc.com/index.php
Home colours	Away colours

Cumbernauld Colts Football Club is a football team from Cumbernauld, Scotland which was formed in 1969 and currently compete in the Lowland League West.

The senior team competed in the Caledonian Amateur Football League with the club eventually entering the Lowland Football League in 2015.

== History ==
Colts were formed in 1969, and had success as a youth football club in the 70s and 80s, helping develop young footballers such as future Scotland internationals Derek Whyte, Jackie McNamara and Dougie Bell.

The club had a period of decline in the '90s, due to several of its teams disbanding. It was re-branded in 1999, and built its way back up.

In 2015, the club was awarded full membership of the Scottish FA and was elected to the SLFL.

== Ground ==
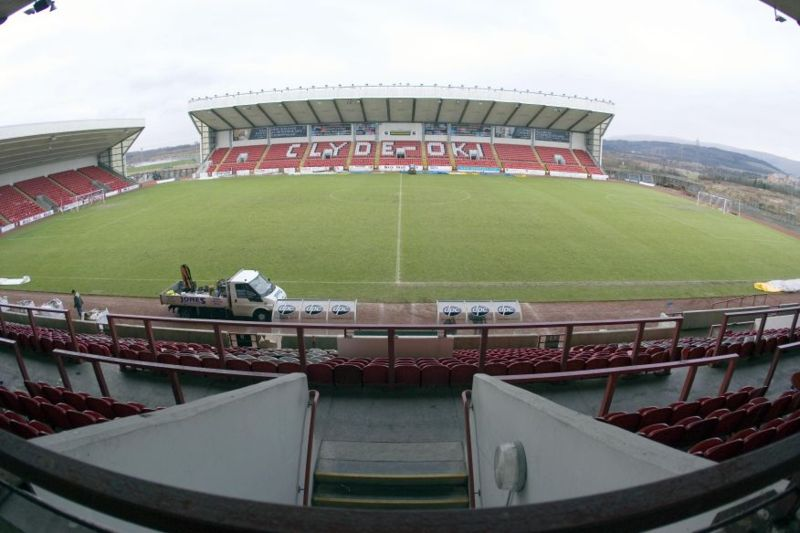
Broadwood Stadium

Colts currently play at the all-seated Broadwood Stadium.

== Current squad ==
As of 1 July 2026

Note: Flags indicate national team as defined under FIFA eligibility rules; some limited exceptions apply. Players may hold more than one non-FIFA nationality.

No.	Pos.	Nation	Player
1	GK	SCO	David Wilson
2	DF	SCO	Adam Fernie
3	DF	SCO	Cameron Dickson
4	DF	SCO	Oliver Hynd (On-loan from Rangers)
5	DF	SCO	Callum Home (captain)
7	FW	SCO	Olly McDonald
8	MF	SCO	Scott Walker
9	FW	SCO	Jamie Semple
10	FW	SCO	Thomas Horn (on-loan from Partick Thistle)
11	MF	SCO	Ji Stevenson (On-loan at Blantyre Victoria)
12	MF	SCO	Aiden McLaughlin (Vice-Captain)
14	MF	SCO	Harrison Howe
15	DF	SCO	Jack Devlin
16	DF	SCO	Alex Mann
17	MF	SCO	Jude Freel (On-loan from St Mirren)

No.	Pos.	Nation	Player
18	GK	SCO	Steven Kearney
19	FW	SCO	Lucas McCormick
20	FW	SCO	Daniel Hatfield
21	FW	IRL	Abraham Osemeke
22	FW	SCO	Callum Graham
—	MF	SCO	Toby Ferrie
—	DF	SCO	Liam Allison
—	DF	SCO	Pat Moy
—	DF	SCO	Anthony Carroll
—	DF	SCO	Anthony Maguire
—	DF	SCO	Liam Bell (On-loan at Lanark United)
—	MF	SCO	Angus Paterson (On-loan at Ashfield)
—	MF	SCO	Mark McCaffrey
—	MF	NZL	Jake Williams
—	MF	SCO	Liam Brown
—	MF	SCO	Rory Marley
—	FW	SCO	Charlie Rundell
—	FW	SCO	Curtis Smith

== Coaching staff ==
- Manager: John Doyle
- Assistant manager: David Gormley
- Coach: Zander Diamond and Scott Murdoch
- Goalkeeping coach: David Porter
- Physio: Shannon Laverty

== Season-by-season record ==
=== Lowland League ===
Season	Div.	Pos.	Pld.	W	D	L	GD	Pts.	Scottish Cup
Cumbernauld Colts
2015–16	Lowland League	4th	28	15	6	7	+18	51	3rd Round, losing to Stirling Albion
2016–17	Lowland League	6th	30	13	8	9	+8	47	2nd Round Replay, losing to Forres Mechanics
2017–18	Lowland League	6th	30	11	8	11	−1	41	1st Round, losing to Colville Park A.F.C.
2018–19	Lowland League	7th	28	11	6	11	−7	39	2nd Round, losing to BSC Glasgow F.C.
2019–20	Lowland League	9th†	27	10	6	11	−1	36	1st Round, losing to Penicuik Athletic F.C.
2020–21	Lowland League	14th†	14	3	2	9	−13	11	1st Round, losing to Huntly F.C.
2021–22	Lowland League	14th	34	10	5	19	-20	35	1st Round, losing to Buckie Thistle F.C.
2022–23	Lowland League	14th	36	14	4	18	+3	46	1st Round, losing to Dalbeattie Star F.C.
2023–24	Lowland League								
2024–25	Lowland League								

† Season curtailed due to coronavirus pandemic

== Honours ==
Lowland League Cup

- Winners (2): 2017–18, 2025–26

SFA South Region Challenge Cup

- Runners-up: 2016–17
