= Lowland Football League =

Association football league in Scotland

Lowland League
- Founded: 2013; 2026 (East/West)
- Country: Scotland
- Other club from: England (1 team)
- Confederation: UEFA
- Number of clubs: 16 (East); 17 (West)
- Level on pyramid: 5
- Promotion to: Scottish League Two
- Relegation to: East of Scotland Football League; Midlands Football League; South of Scotland Football League; West of Scotland Football League
- Domestic cup(s): Scottish Cup; South Region Challenge Cup; Scottish League Cup (champions); Scottish Junior Cup (SJFA members)
- League cup: Lowland League Cup
- Current champions: Linlithgow Rose (1st title) (2025–26)
- Most championships: East Kilbride (4 titles)
- Website: slfl.co.uk
- Current: 2026–27 Lowland Football League

The Scottish Lowland Football League (SLFL, commonly known as the Lowland League and the Park's Motor Group Scottish Lowland League for sponsorship reasons) is a senior football league based in central and southern Scotland. The league sits at level 5 on the Scottish football league system, acting as a feeder to the Scottish Professional Football League, and is above three regional leagues at level 6.

Founded in 2013, until season 2025–26 it was composed of 18 member clubs in a single division. Geographically, the league covered an area south of Dundee in the Lowlands area of Scotland.

Since 2014–15, it has featured in the senior pyramid system. From seasons 2014-15 to 2025-26 the winners took part in an end of season promotion home-and-away play-off with the Highland Football League champions, with the winners of this play-off then competing against the bottom club in Scottish League Two for a place in the SPFL.

Promotion and relegation exists between the three post-restructure Lowlands-based regional leagues at level 6 (East, South, and West).

Season 2025–26 was the last season in the league's previous format ahead of the league splitting into Lowland League East and Lowland League West for season 2026–27 onwards.

== Format ==
Teams play each other twice in the league (home and away), receiving three points for a win and one point for a draw. No points are awarded for a loss. At the end of each season, the club with the most points is crowned Lowland League champions. If points are equal, goal difference, and then goals scored determines the champion. If this still does not result in a winner, the tied teams must take part in a championship play-off match at a neutral venue to determine the final placings.

=== Promotion and relegation ===
Since 2014–15, promotion to the Scottish Professional Football League is via an annual play-off, beginning with the Lowland League champions facing the champions of the Highland Football League over two legs (home and away). There is no away goals rule so if scores are equal on aggregate after full-time in the second leg, the game will go to extra time, and then penalties if required. The winners will then face a play-off against the bottom club in League Two with the same rules applying. If the League Two club loses the play-off final, they are relegated to the Lowland League or Highland League.

Promotion to the Lowland League is via a three match round robin play-off between the winners of the East of Scotland Football League, South of Scotland Football League, and West of Scotland Football League, subject to their respective champions meeting league membership criteria. If only two clubs meet the criteria, they face each other home and away. If only one club meets the criteria, they will be promoted without a play-off. If no clubs meet the criteria there will be no promotion to the Lowland League.

Based on the number of clubs remaining after the results of promotion to and from the league are known, the bottom and possibly second-bottom placed clubs will be relegated to the East of Scotland Football League, South of Scotland Football League, or West of Scotland Football League depending on their geographical location.

=== Scottish Cup ===
All Lowland League clubs are full members of the Scottish Football Association and qualify automatically for the first round of the Scottish Cup.

The furthest a Lowland League team has reached in the Scottish Cup is the fifth round (last 16), achieved by The Spartans in 2014–15 (lost 1–0 to Berwick Rangers in a replay), East Kilbride in 2015–16 (lost 2–0 to Celtic) and BSC Glasgow in 2019–20 (lost 4–1 to Hibernian).

== History ==
The Lowland Football League was intended on helping institute a football pyramid including promotion and relegation from Scottish football's national divisions down to its junior and amateur levels by the Scottish Football Association.

=== Formation ===
The Lowland League was founded by a unanimous vote of members of the Scottish Football Association (SFA) on 11 June 2013, The league would be composed of teams drawn from the East of Scotland, South of Scotland, and junior leagues, who met on 17 June 2013 to elect between them the founder-members of the new league.

While most clubs were invited to submit bids to join, Preston Athletic, The Spartans and Threave Rovers were offered automatic entry as they were already fully licensed by the SFA. While 27 clubs had registered their interest, the Lowland League received 17 applications to join. After the meeting on 17 June, it was announced there would be 12 teams in the league, and that they would be: Dalbeattie Star, East Kilbride, Edinburgh City, Gala Fairydean Rovers, Gretna 2008, Preston Athletic, Selkirk, The Spartans, Threave Rovers, University of Stirling, Vale of Leithen, and Whitehill Welfare.

=== Expansion ===
Subsequent seasons saw the number of participating clubs increase. Two clubs, Edinburgh University and BSC Glasgow, were admitted to the league for the 2014–15 season. They were joined the following season by Cumbernauld Colts. Civil Service Strollers and Hawick Royal Albert joined in June 2016, making it a 16-team league.

=== Pyramid movement ===
The end of the 2015–16 season was the first time that founding members would leave the league; Edinburgh City became the first club to be promoted to the SPFL, while Threave Rovers declined the opportunity to re-apply to the league after finishing bottom and rejoined the South of Scotland Football League. The same season also saw East Stirlingshire become the first club relegated into the league from Scottish League Two.

Another founding member would leave the league at the end of the 2016-17 season as Preston Athletic were relegated to the East of Scotland League. They were replaced by Edusport Academy who became the first club to gain promotion from the South of Scotland League.

In 2017–18, the first promotion play-off took place between the champions of the East of Scotland and South of Scotland leagues, with former SJFA East Region club Kelty Hearts winning 10–0 on aggregate over Threave Rovers to gain promotion.

=== Decline of Selkirk ===
During the 2018–19 season, Selkirk resigned their membership in the league owing to insurmountable difficulties. It was agreed by the Lowland League board that all fixtures played by and to be played by Selkirk in 2018–19 would be expunged from the record along with any other data involving Selkirk for that season. The Lowland League moved forward with 15 clubs, however Whitehill Welfare, who finished bottom in the season's competition, were still relegated to the East of Scotland League. East of Scotland champions Bonnyrigg Rose were promoted to the league after gaining their SFA membership. Berwick Rangers became the second club to be relegated into the league from the SPFL, having lost the League Two play-off against Cove Rangers.

=== Impact of Covid ===
At the start of the 2019–20 season, Edusport Academy rebranded the club as the Caledonian Braves following a vote online by members of the Our Football Club.com project. The 2019–20 league season was suspended on 13 March 2020 due to the COVID-19 pandemic. A month later, the competition was ended with immediate effect with Kelty Hearts being declared champions on a points per game average based on the current standings. Vale of Leithen who were bottom of the league were also spared relegation.

=== West of Scotland Football League ===
On 14 April 2020, the Lowland League announced it had approved 67 applications to join the new West of Scotland Football League, which included all 63 clubs from the Scottish Junior Football Association's West Region, and four others. Bonnyton Thistle already a member of the South of Scotland League decided to move due to being based in Kilmarnock. The West of Scotland League acts as a feeder league on the same tier as the East of Scotland Football League and South of Scotland Football League.

=== Kelty Hearts promotion ===
The league consisted of 17 teams for the 2020–21 season with East of Scotland champions Bo'ness United being promoted after gaining their SFA membership in June 2020. The start of the league season was delayed until October 2020 because of the COVID-19 pandemic, and games were played behind closed doors due to Scottish Government restrictions. On 11 January 2021, the league was suspended by the Scottish Football Association due to the escalating pandemic situation. On 30 March, the league announced that a majority of clubs had voted to curtail the season, with a points per game basis used to finalise standings and Kelty Hearts were declared as the champions. Kelty became the second Lowland League club to gain promotion to the SPFL after beating Brechin City 3–1 on aggregate in the Pyramid play-off final.

=== B teams ===
Celtic and Rangers were approached by the Lowland League for a proposal to admit "B" teams (also known as "Colt" teams) into the league for the 2021–22 season. The proposal was given provisional approval by the majority of member clubs with the vote being confirmed at the leagues AGM on 27 May 2021. This arrangement was renewed for the 2022–23 season, with Hearts also providing a B team. Celtic and Hearts continued for the 2023–24 season but Rangers withdrew their entry in June 2023. In January 2026, Hearts confirmed they would be discarding their B team and therefore withdrawing from the league, leaving Celtic as the only remaining side for the 2026–27 season.

=== Lowland League East and Lowland League West ===
In July 2025, the SFA approved a restructure of Tier 5 which will see the Lowland League replaced by a Lowland League East and a Lowland League West, with both leagues co-existing alongside the Highland League.

== Member clubs ==
Location of teams in 2026–27 Scottish Lowland League
Lowland League West; Lowland League East
Location of teams in 2026–27 Scottish Lowland League East
Location of teams in 2026–27 Scottish Lowland League West

Team	Location	Stadium	Surface	Capacity	Seats
Albion Rovers	Coatbridge	Cliftonhill	Grass	1,238	489
Auchinleck Talbot	Auchinleck	Beechwood Park	Grass	3,500	500
Beith Juniors	Beith	Bellsdale Park	Grass	1,809	0
Berwick Rangers	(England) Berwick-upon-Tweed	Shielfield Park	Grass	4,099	1,366
Bo'ness United	Bo'ness	Newtown Park	Artificial	2,500	0
Bonnyrigg Rose	Bonnyrigg	New Dundas Park	Grass	2,020	72
Broxburn Athletic	Broxburn	Albyn Park	Artificial	2,050	0
Caledonian Braves	Motherwell	Alliance Park	Artificial	500	100
Celtic B	Airdrie	Excelsior Stadium (Note: Celtic B are ground-sharing with Airdrieonians.)	Artificial	10,101	10,101
Civil Service Strollers	Edinburgh	Christie Gillies Park	Grass	1,569	100
Clydebank	Clydebank	Holm Park	Artificial	1,200	0
Cowdenbeath	Cowdenbeath	Central Park	Grass	4,309	1,622
Cumbernauld Colts	Cumbernauld	Broadwood Stadium	Artificial	8,086	8,086
Cumnock Juniors	Cumnock	Townhead Park	Artificial	2,000	0
Dalbeattie Star	Dalbeattie	Islecroft Stadium	Grass	1,320	100
Dunipace	Denny	Westfield Park	Artificial	1,000	0
East Stirlingshire	Falkirk	Falkirk Stadium (Note: East Stirlingshire are ground-sharing with Falkirk.)	Artificial	7,937	7,937
Gala Fairydean Rovers	Galashiels	3G Arena, Netherdale	Artificial	2,000	500
Gretna 2008	Gretna	Raydale Park	Artificial	1,030	138
Heart of Midlothian B	Edinburgh	Ainslie Park (Note: Heart of Midlothian B are ground-sharing with The Spartans.)	Artificial	3,500	192
Hill of Beath Hawthorn	Hill of Beath	Keir's Park	Grass	1,080	0
Johnstone Burgh	Johnstone	Keanie Park	Grass	2,393	0
Kilwinning Rangers	Kilwinning	Buffs Park	Grass	2,800	0
Largs Thistle	Largs	Barrfields Park	Artificial	3,000	800
Linlithgow Rose	Linlithgow	Prestonfield	Grass	2,264	301
Lochee United	Dundee	Thomson Park	Grass	2,000	0
Musselburgh Athletic	Musselburgh	Olivebank Stadium	Grass	1,500	0
Newton Stewart	Newton Stewart	Blairmount Park	Artificial	1,000	0
Pollok	Pollokshaws, Glasgow	Newlandsfield Park	Grass	2,088	0
Renfrew	Renfrew	New Western Park	Artificial	1,000	0
Troon	Troon	Portland Park	Grass	2,000	0
Tranent	Tranent	Foresters Park	Grass	2,300	44
University of Stirling	Stirling	Forthbank Stadium (Note: University of Stirling are ground-sharing with Stirling Albion.)	Grass	3,808	2,508

Notes

All grounds are equipped with floodlights.

=== Former members ===
Promoted to the SPFL

- Edinburgh City, 2016; (Scottish League Two)
- Kelty Hearts, 2021; (Scottish League Two)
- The Spartans, 2023; (Scottish League Two)
- East Kilbride, 2025; (Scottish League One)

Relegated

- Preston Athletic, 2017; (East of Scotland League Premier Division)
- Hawick Royal Albert United, 2018; (East of Scotland League Second Division)
- Whitehill Welfare, 2019; (East of Scotland League First Division)
- Vale of Leithen, 2022; (East of Scotland League Third Division)
- Edinburgh University, 2024; (East of Scotland League Premier Division)
- Broomhill, 2025; (Folded)

Resigned

- Threave Rovers, 2016; (West of Scotland League First Division)
- Selkirk, 2018; (Folded)
- Rangers B, 2023; (Withdrew)

== Seasons ==
Season	Champions	Runners-up	Relegated (Note: Relegated from the Lowland League or withdrew)	New members (Note: Relegated from the SPFL, or promoted or invited into the Lowland League - see notes against Champions to indicate teams promoted up to the SPFL)
2013–14	The Spartans (Note: No promotion playoffs)	University of Stirling		
2014–15	Edinburgh City (Note: Lost to Brora Rangers)	East Kilbride		Edinburgh University ^{I} BSC Glasgow ^{I}
2015–16	Edinburgh City* (Note: Beat Cove Rangers, beat East Stirlingshire) (2)	The Spartans	Threave Rovers ^{S}	Cumbernauld Colts ^{I}
2016–17	East Kilbride (Note: Beat Buckie Thistle, lost to Cowdenbeath)	East Stirlingshire	Preston Athletic ^{E}	East Stirlingshire ^{R} Civil Service Strollers ^{I} Hawick Royal Albert ^{I}
2017–18	The Spartans (Note: Lost to Cove Rangers) (2)	East Kilbride (2)	Hawick Royal Albert ^{E}	Edusport Academy ^{S}
2018–19	East Kilbride (Note: Lost to Cove Rangers) (2)	BSC Glasgow	Selkirk (Note: Withdrew and folded); Whitehill Welfare ^{E}	Kelty Hearts ^{PO} ^{E}
2019–20	Kelty Hearts†	Bonnyrigg Rose Athletic		Berwick Rangers ^{R} Bonnyrigg Rose Athletic ^{E}
2020–21	Kelty Hearts*† (Note: Beat Brora Rangers, beat Brechin City) (2)	East Kilbride (3)		Bo'ness United ^{E}
2021–22	Bonnyrigg Rose Athletic* (Note: Beat Fraserburgh, beat Cowdenbeath)	East Kilbride (4)	Vale of Leithen ^{E}	Celtic B ^{I} Rangers B ^{I}
2022–23	The Spartans* (Note: Beat Brechin City, beat Albion Rovers) (3)	University of Stirling (2)	Dalbeattie Star ^{S} Rangers B (Note: Opted not to continue invitation to participate)	Cowdenbeath ^{R} Tranent Juniors ^{PO} ^{E} Heart of Midlothian B ^{I}
2023–24	East Kilbride (3)	Bo'ness United	Edinburgh University ^{E}	Albion Rovers ^{R} Linlithgow Rose ^{E}
2024–25	East Kilbride* (Note: Beat Brora Rangers, beat Bonnyrigg Rose)(4)	Caledonian Braves	Broomhill	Broxburn Athletic ^{E}
2025–26	Linlithgow Rose	Clydebank		Bonnyrigg Rose ^{R} Clydebank ^{W}

* Team promoted to Scottish League Two
^{R} Relegated team from previous season's Scottish League Two
^{I} Invited rather than promoted from lower tier in traditional manner
^{PO} Winner of previous season's promotion playoff
^{E} Team relegated to or promoted from the East of Scotland Football League
^{S} Team relegated to or promoted from the South of Scotland Football League
^{W} Team relegated to or promoted from the West of Scotland Football League

† Season curtailed due to COVID-19 pandemic - Kelty were announced as champions for the 2019-20 and 2020–21 season. A points per game basis was used to finalise standings.

=== Top scorers ===
Season	Player	Team	Goals
2013–14	(Scotland) Keith McLeod	The Spartans	17
2014–15	(Scotland) Aaron Somerville	Whitehill Welfare	23
2015–16	(Scotland) Ross Allum	Edinburgh City	27
2016–17	(Scotland) David Grant	East Stirlingshire	35
2017–18	(Scotland) Jack Smith	BSC Glasgow	21
2018–19	(Scotland) Craig Malcolm	East Kilbride	25
2019–20	(England) Nathan Austin	Kelty Hearts	37
2020–21	(Scotland) Jamie Penker	University of Stirling	11
2021–22	(Scotland) Blair Henderson	The Spartans	27
2022–23	(Scotland) Liam Buchanan	Berwick Rangers	22
2023–24	(Northern Ireland) Makenzie Kirk	Hearts B	26
2024–25	(Scotland) Cami Elliott	East Kilbride	25
2025–26	(Scotland) Lennon Walker	Caledonian Braves	27

=== Records ===
Biggest home win
Hearts B 12-0 Edinburgh University, 5 January 2024
Biggest away win
Vale of Leithen 0–13 Bonnyrigg Rose, 6 October 2021
Most goals in a game
The Spartans 11–2 Selkirk, 7 December 2013
Most points in a season
87; Bonnyrigg Rose, 2021-22
Fewest points in a season
5; Selkirk, 2013-14 and Vale of Leithen, 2021-22 (Note: Inaugural league season which consisted of 12 teams. Hawick Royal Albert's 6 points from 30 games in 2017-18 is fewer points per game.) (0; Vale of Leithen, 2020-21 (Note: 2020-21 Season curtailed due to COVID-19 pandemic with fewer than 50% of matches played.))
Longest unbeaten run in a season
21; Kelty Hearts, 2019–20
Most wins in a season
28; Bonnyrigg Rose, 2021-22
Fewest wins in a season
1; Hawick Royal Albert, 2017-18, Vale of Leithen, 2021-22, Dalbeattie Star, 2022-23 (0; Vale of Leithen, 2020-21)
Most draws in a season
12; Cowdenbeath, 2024-25
Most defeats in a season
31; Vale of Leithen, 2021-22
Fewest defeats in a season
1; Edinburgh City, 2014-15 and Kelty Hearts, 2019-20
Most goals scored in a season
114; East Kilbride, 2024-25
Fewest goals scored in a season
10; Vale of Leithen, 2021-22 (5; Vale of Leithen, 2020-21)
Most goals conceded in a season
166; Vale of Leithen, 2021-22
Fewest goals conceded in a season
12; East Kilbride, 2018-19 (4; Kelty Hearts, 2020-21)

== Managers ==
Dougie Samuel is the most successful manager of the Lowland League having won three league titles with Spartans. Spartans won the inaugural league title during the 2013-14 season, clinched their second title in 2018, and third title in 2023, as well as winning promotion to the SPFL.

Gary Jardine, Barry Ferguson, and Robbie Horn have also guided their clubs to promotion to the SPFL after winning the Lowland League.

East Kilbride have won the title a record four times with different managers, Martin Lauchlan in 2017, Stuart Malcolm in 2019, and Mick Kennedy in 2024 and 2025.

Winning managers
Manager	Club(s)	Wins	Winning years
(Scotland) Dougie Samuel	The Spartans	3	2013–14, 2017–18, 2022–23
(Scotland) Gary Jardine	Edinburgh City	2	2014–15, 2015–16
(Scotland) Barry Ferguson	Kelty Hearts	2	2019–20, 2020–21
(Scotland) Mick Kennedy	East Kilbride	2	2023–24, 2024–25
(Scotland) Martin Lauchlan	East Kilbride	1	2016–17
(Scotland) Stuart Malcolm	East Kilbride	1	2018–19
(Scotland) Robbie Horn	Bonnyrigg Rose	1	2021–22
(Scotland) Gordon Herd	Linlithgow Rose	1	2025–26

Current managers
Nat.	Name	Club	Appointed	Time as manager
(Scotland)	Chris Geddes	University of Stirling	30 June 2017	9 years, 130 days
(Scotland)	Gary Jardine	Civil Service Strollers	23 May 2018	8 years, 168 days
(Scotland)	Gordon Moffat	Clydebank	3 September 2019	7 years, 65 days
(Scotland)	Gordon Herd	Linlithgow Rose	22 August 2021	5 years, 77 days
(Scotland)	Martin Scott	Gala Fairydean Rovers	9 January 2022	4 years, 302 days
(Republic of Ireland)	Darren O'Dea	Celtic B	1 June 2022	4 years, 159 days
(Scotland)	Stuart Hunter	Bo'ness United	5 June 2023	3 years, 155 days
(Scotland)	Vinnie Parker	Gretna 2008	10 May 2024	2 years, 181 days
(Scotland)	Angus Beith	Hearts B	21 November 2024	1 year, 351 days
(Scotland)	John Doyle	Cumbernauld Colts	3 January 2025	1 year, 308 days
(Scotland)	Kevin Haynes	Berwick Rangers	7 January 2025	1 year, 304 days
(Scotland)	Jonny Stewart	Bonnyrigg Rose	13 March 2025	1 year, 239 days
(Scotland)	Robbie Horn	Tranent	8 April 2025	1 year, 213 days
(Scotland)	Paul McLean	Cowdenbeath	28 April 2025	1 year, 193 days
(Scotland)	John Millar	Broxburn Athletic	31 August 2025	1 year, 68 days
(Scotland)	Callum Tapping	East Stirlingshire	1 September 2025	1 year, 67 days
(Scotland)	Jamie McNee	Caledonian Braves	8 May 2026	183 days
(Scotland)	Steven Saunders	Albion Rovers	9 June 2026	151 days

== Youth competitions ==
The Lowlands Development League operates for the Under 20s youth teams of clubs in the Lowland, East of Scotland, South of Scotland and West of Scotland leagues, along with other invited SPFL clubs. Originally named the Lowland and East of Scotland Under 20 Development League when it began in 2014, this replaced an earlier Under 19 league run by the East of Scotland League. Matches are normally played on Friday nights.

The Under 20s league expanded to 31 teams for the 2019–20 season, split into two conferences, having already increased in size from 13 to 23 teams thanks to the addition of new clubs to the East of Scotland League in 2018–19. A year later, the aborted 2020–21 season saw numbers increase to 68 along with the addition of three West Conferences due to the introduction of the West of Scotland League within the Scottish football pyramid.

For the 2021–22 season, a record number of 88 clubs are taking part, split across six Conferences. Petershill, Kilwinning Rangers, and Darvel later withdrew their team from the Development League.

Ahead of the 2023–24 season - the development leagues were separated and are now governed by their own respective leagues. The Scottish Lowlands Development Football League previously consisted of 14 clubs (Edinburgh City later withdrew) in only one division with a mixture of SPFL and Lowland League clubs. 12 teams competed in the league for the 2024–25 season. The number of teams reduced to 10 ahead of the 2025–26 season.

Scottish Lowlands Development Football League

- Bo'ness United
- Caledonian Braves
- Cumbernauld Colts
- Dumbarton
- East Fife
- Edinburgh City
- Linlithgow Rose
- Stirling Albion
- The Spartans
- University of Stirling

These clubs also take part in two cup competitions for both the Eastern and Western conferences, as well as a combined challenge cup. Prior to it becoming a competition for Under 18 teams in 2018 many also competed in the annual SFA Scottish Youth Cup.

=== Seasons ===
The Spartans won the first Lowlands Development League title in 2015. The title was then won by Preston Athletic in 2016, East Kilbride in 2017, and Heriot-Watt University in 2018.

From the 2018–19 season, the league was split into two conferences. Conference B winners Spartans won their second title after beating Conference A winners Kelty Hearts in a play-off match which determined the overall league champions.

Edinburgh City were declared champions of Conference A and University of Stirling champions of Conference B after the 2019–20 season was cut short due to the COVID-19 pandemic.

There was no league champion for 2020–21 as the season did not start due to the COVID-19 pandemic.

Season	Champions	Runners-up
2014–15	The Spartans	Whitehill Welfare
2015–16	Preston Athletic	The Spartans
2016–17	East Kilbride	The Spartans (2)
2017–18	Heriot-Watt University	Cumbernauld Colts
2018–19	The Spartans (2)	Kelty Hearts
2019–20	Conference A: Edinburgh City; B: University of Stirling	
2020–21	No competition	
2021–22	Conference A: University of Stirling (2)	
2022–23	Conference A: Cumbernauld Colts	
2023–24	University of Stirling (3)	East Kilbride
2024–25	The Spartans (3)	University of Stirling
2025–26	University of Stirling (4)	Dumbarton

== Lowland League Cup ==
The competition is a 16 team straight knock-out tournament between member clubs, excluding B teams. The league champion previously had the right to withdraw from the competition to concentrate on the Scottish League Two play-offs, however, the competition is now played out earlier in the season rather than over four weekends at the end of the league campaign.

Season	Winner	Score	Runners–up
2013–14	University of Stirling	5–2	Preston Athletic
2014–15	East Kilbride	3–1	Gretna 2008
2015–16	East Kilbride (2)	0–0 AET; 4–2 on penalties	Gretna 2008
2016–17	The Spartans	3–0	BSC Glasgow
2017–18	Cumbernauld Colts	3–1	Selkirk
2018–19	BSC Glasgow	2–1	East Stirlingshire
2019–20	No competition		
2020–21	No competition		
2021–22	East Kilbride (3)	4–2	Bo'ness United
2022–23	East Kilbride (4)	2–2 AET; 5–4 on penalties	Bo'ness United
2023–24	Tranent	2–2 AET; 5–4 on penalties	East Kilbride
2024–25	East Kilbride (5)	3–1	Bo'ness United
2025–26	Cumbernauld Colts (2)	3–2	Gala Fairydean Rovers

== Sponsorship ==
On 24 September 2013, the Scottish Sun newspaper announced it was sponsoring the league. The league was then sponsored by Ferrari Packaging on a two-year agreement, which was extended to cover the 2017–18 season. In August 2018, GeoSonic, the Alloa-based sonic drilling contractor, concluded a one-year deal to become the new title sponsor of the Scottish Lowland Football League for the 2018-19 season. On 4 March 2022, Clarke ePOS was announced as the league's title sponsor until the end of the 2022–23 season, however, the partnership was ended in August 2022. The league announced a two-year official naming partnership with Park's Motor Group in December 2022.

== Media coverage ==
The league has its own podcast known as The Lowland League Catchup. As well as weekly previews to games, and reviews known as the Roundup.

On 19 September 2018, the SLFL agreed a comprehensive media partnership with RockSport Radio but this has since ended.
