= Civil Service Strollers F.C. =

Association football club in Edinburgh, Scotland

Civil Service Strollers
- Full name: Civil Service Strollers Football Club
- Nickname: Strollers
- Founded: 1908
- Ground: Christie Gillies Park, Edinburgh
- Capacity: 1,569 (100 seated)
- Coordinates: 55.9762°N 3.2592°W
- Manager: Gary Jardine
- League: Lowland League East
- 2025–26: Lowland League, 14th of 18
- Website: http://www.csstrollers.com/
| Home colours | Away colours |

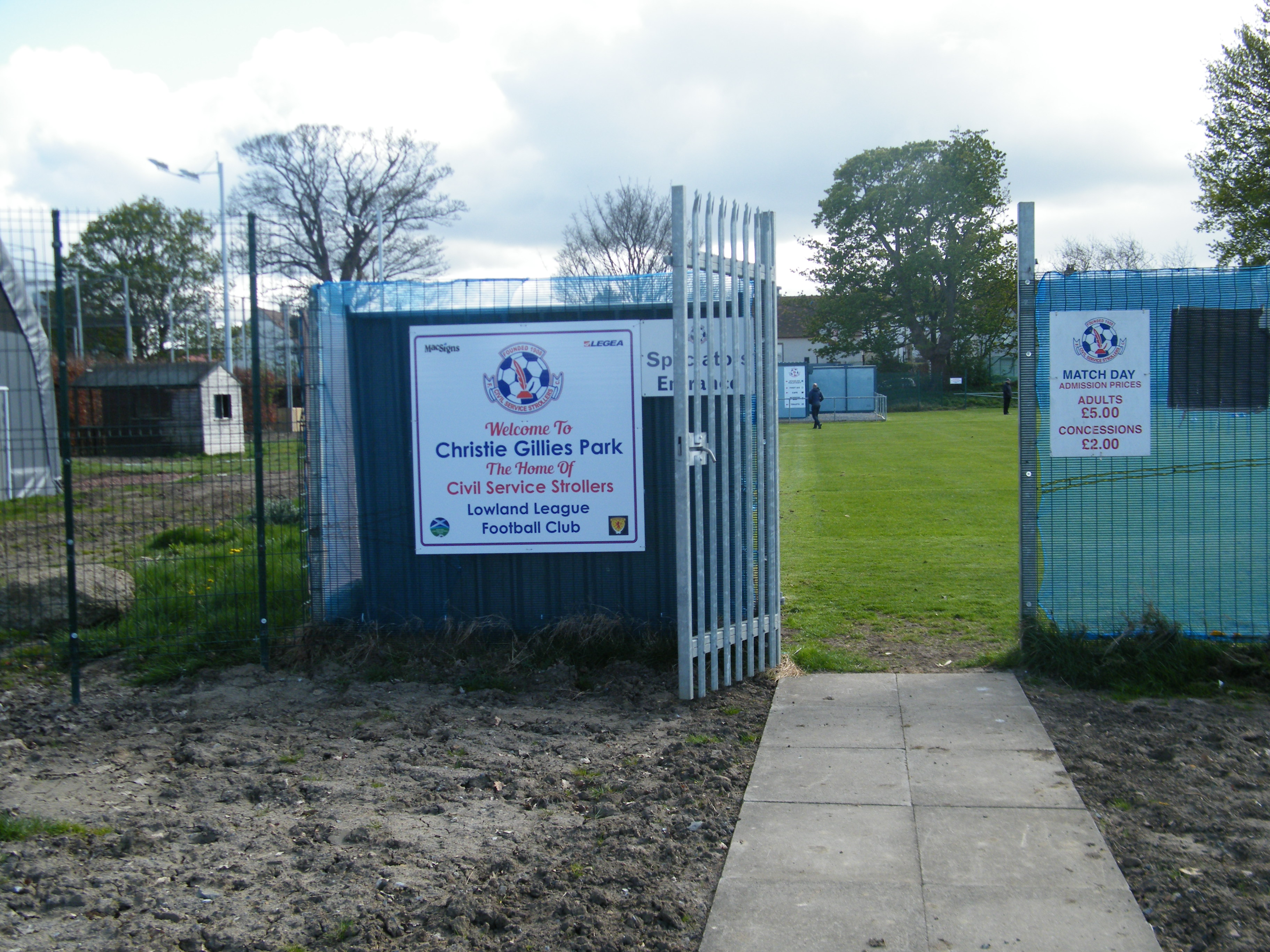
Main Entrance to Christie Gillies Park

Civil Service Strollers Football Club are a senior non-league football team from Edinburgh, Scotland currently playing in the Lowland League East. The Strollers play their home games at Christie Gillies Park. Their home strip colours are red, with white shorts and red socks. The team is currently managed by Gary Jardine.

== History ==
Founded in 1908 under the name Edinburgh Civil Service Football Club, their first ground was the Stenhouse Stadium, which later became a venue for greyhound racing, before moving to Pinkhill Stadium in the 1920s. They moved to the Edinburgh Area Civil Service Sports Association in Muirhouse in 1957, where they continue to play their home games, the ground is commonly known as Christie Gillies Park.

In 2000–01, the club entered into a partnership with Talloaks to develop youth football, with the Talloaks youth teams taking on the name 'CS Strollers'. At the start of the 2001–02 season, the partnership was extended to cover all other ages of organised football. 2001–02 saw the Strollers having, for the first time, a fully incorporated women's team.

Ahead of the 2016–17 season, they were elected to fill one of two vacancies in the Lowland Football League.

Their former management team was Alex Cunningham and Ricky Clapperton until Gary Jardine took over for the 2018–19 season.

== Ground ==
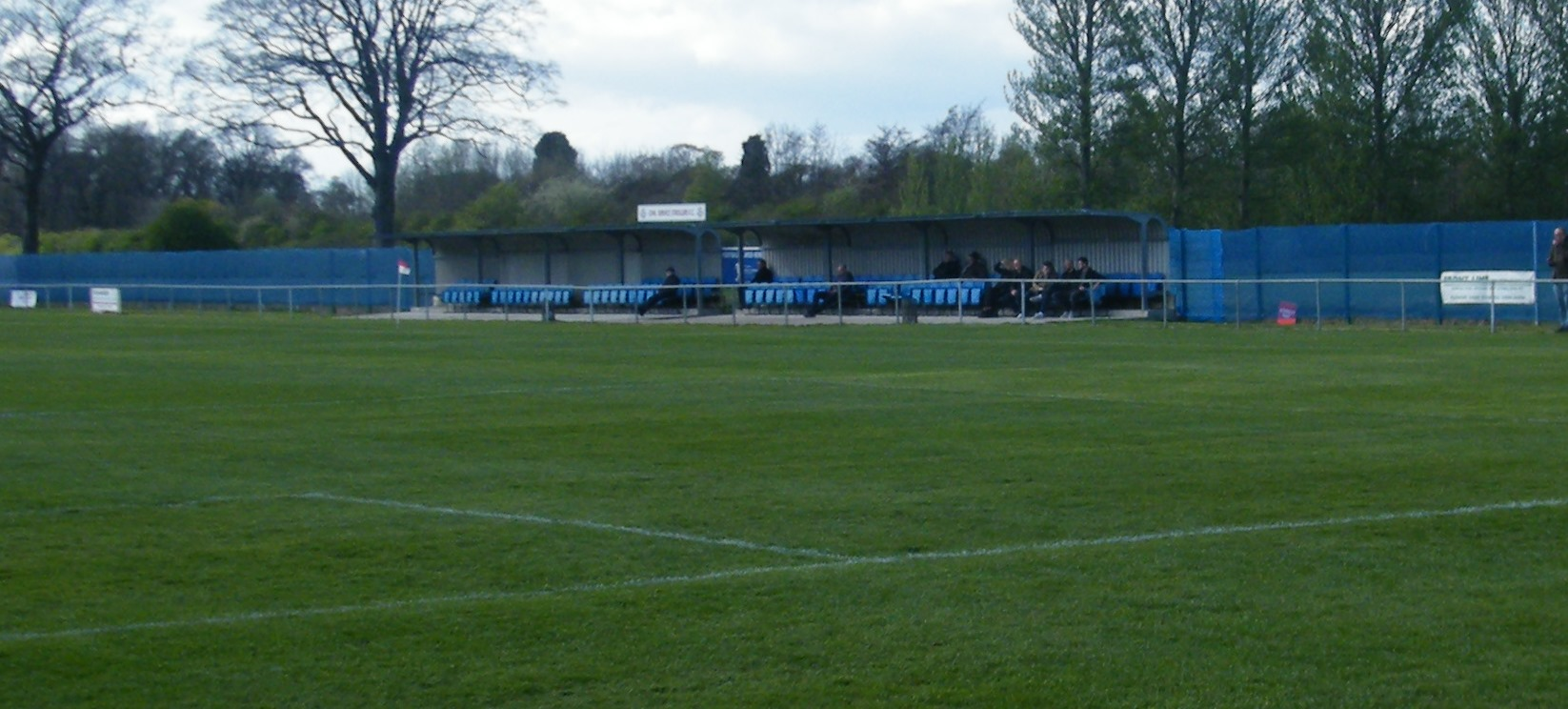
Main Stand

Strollers play their home games at Christie Gillies Park, which is located just off Marine Drive in Muirhouse, Edinburgh. The ground has one small stand along the North side with the dugouts on the South side. The ground has a capacity of 1,596 with around 100 of that being seated. The pitch was once part of a large playing field but work was carried out in 2015 to provide cover for spectators and enclose the ground. Floodlights were added in 2019 to meet SFA licensing criteria.

== Current squad ==
As of 5 August 2026

Note: Flags indicate national team as defined under FIFA eligibility rules; some limited exceptions apply. Players may hold more than one non-FIFA nationality.

| No. | Pos. | Nation | Player |
|---|---|---|---|
| — | GK | SCO | MacAllan Whyte |
| — | GK | ITA | Owens Smith Samuel |
| — | DF | SCO | Arran Bone |
| — | DF | SCO | Jacob Glass |
| — | DF | SCO | Josh McCulloch |
| — | DF | SCO | Ross Clarke |
| — | DF | SCO | Ross Pollock |
| — | DF | SCO | Callum Yates |
| — | DF | SCO | Lewis Duffy |
| — | DF | SCO | Luke Morris |

| No. | Pos. | Nation | Player |
|---|---|---|---|
| — | MF | SCO | Archie Wylie (On-loan from The Spartans) |
| — | MF | SCO | Tom Findlay |
| — | MF | SCO | Marc Laird (Captain) |
| — | MF | SCO | Euan Valentine |
| — | MF | SCO | Logan Raeside |
| — | FW | GAM | Alieu Faye |
| — | FW | SCO | Jamie Penker |
| — | FW | SCO | Louis Kennedy |
| — | FW | ANG | Tuacenio dos Santos |
| — | FW | SCO | Callen Robb |
| — | FW | SCO | Jay Mill |
| — | FW | SCO | Johnny Cain |
| — | FW | SCO | Mark Beveridge |

=== On loan ===
Note: Flags indicate national team as defined under FIFA eligibility rules; some limited exceptions apply. Players may hold more than one non-FIFA nationality.

| No. | Pos. | Nation | Player |
|---|---|---|---|
| — | GK | SCO | Josh Scoon (Dalkeith Thistle) |
| — | DF | SCO | Harry Olsson (Lothian Thistle Hutchinson Vale) |

| No. | Pos. | Nation | Player |
|---|---|---|---|
| — | FW | SCO | Max Mackay (Penicuik Athletic) |

== Season-by-season record ==
=== Lowland League ===
| Season | Division | Position | Played | Wins | Draws | Losses | GD | Points | Scottish Cup |
|---|---|---|---|---|---|---|---|---|---|
Civil Service Strollers
| 2016–17 | Lowland League | 12th | 30 | 10 | 7 | 13 | -9 | 37 | First round replay, losing to Hawick Royal Albert |
| 2017–18 | Lowland League | 7th | 30 | 11 | 7 | 12 | +3 | 40 | Second round, losing to Brora Rangers |
| 2018–19 | Lowland League | 5th | 28 | 15 | 4 | 9 | +13 | 49 | Second round, losing to Edinburgh City |
| 2019–20 | Lowland League | 6th† | 23 | 12 | 3 | 8 | +2 | 39 | First round, losing to Buckie Thistle |
| 2020–21 | Lowland League | 11th† | 14 | 4 | 5 | 5 | -2 | 17 | First round, losing to Elgin City |

† Season curtailed due to coronavirus pandemic.

== Honours ==
- East of Scotland Football League
  - Winners (3): 1925–26, 1926–27, 1972–73
  - Runners-up (4): 1927–28, 1980–81, 1988–89, 1989–90
- East of Scotland Football League First Division
  - Winners: 1992–93
  - Runners-up (3): 1996–97, 2002–03, 2008–09
- SFA South Region Challenge Cup
  - Winners: 2017–18
- East of Scotland Qualifying Cup
  - Winners (4): 1921–22; 1929–30; 1979–80; 1988–89
- King Cup
  - Winners (4): 1921–22; 1925–26; 1927–28; 1990–91
- East of Scotland Consolation Cup: 1920–21
- Scottish Amateur Cup: 1910–11; 1920–21
- East of Scotland League Cup: 2000–01
- East of Scotland Trophy: 2001–02
