= Gala Fairydean Rovers F.C. =

Association football club in Scotland

Gala Fairydean Rovers
- Full name: Gala Fairydean Rovers Football Club
- Nickname: GFR
- Founded: 2013
- Ground: Netherdale, Galashiels
- Capacity: 4,000
- Coordinates: 55.606169°N 2.783419°W
- Chairman: Ryan Cass
- Manager: Steven Noble (interim manager)
- League: Lowland League East
- 2025–26: Lowland League, 12th of 18
- Website: http://www.gfrfc.co.uk/
Home colours	Away colours

Gala Fairydean Rovers Football Club are a Scottish association football club based in the town of Galashiels in the Scottish Borders. The club competes in the Lowland League East, after joining from the East of Scotland Football League in 2013. At the same time the club changed its name to Gala Fairydean Rovers, following a merger between Gala Fairydean and Gala Rovers. The club plays its home matches at Netherdale in Galashiels.

Gala Fairydean won the East of Scotland Football League eight times and finished runners-up on seven occasions. The club reached 15 Scottish Qualifying Cup South finals, winning it 11 times, before the competition was abolished in 2007. Gala Fairydean Rovers qualify automatically for the Scottish Cup as a member of the Scottish Football Association (SFA). The best performance by the club was reaching the third round, done on five occasions. Gala Rovers won the Border Amateur Football League 13 times.

== History ==
Gala Fairydean Rovers was first formed in 1894. In 1907 the club was separated into two teams, known as Gala Fairydean and Gala Rovers. The first Gala Rovers was the reserve team of Gala Fairydean. Both clubs ceased operations in 1914 due to the outbreak of the First World War and the consequent loss of male population in Galashiels. Gala Fairydean resumed in 1919, after the war had ended, and was a founder member of the East of Scotland Football League in 1923.

Gala Rovers were only reformed in 1947 and joined the Border Amateur League. Although the two clubs were separate, they were closely linked through operations such as a joint lottery. Although Gala Fairydean were a semi-professional club and needed funds to pay players, Gala Rovers were amateur and could save some of the funds generated. This helped to fund construction of the 1960s main stand at Netherdale. Gala Fairydean applied to join the Scottish Football League in 1966, 1994, 2000 and 2002, but were unsuccessful on each occasion.

The two clubs merged to form Gala Fairydean Rovers in 2013. The club was admitted into the new Lowland Football League in 2013.

== Stadium ==
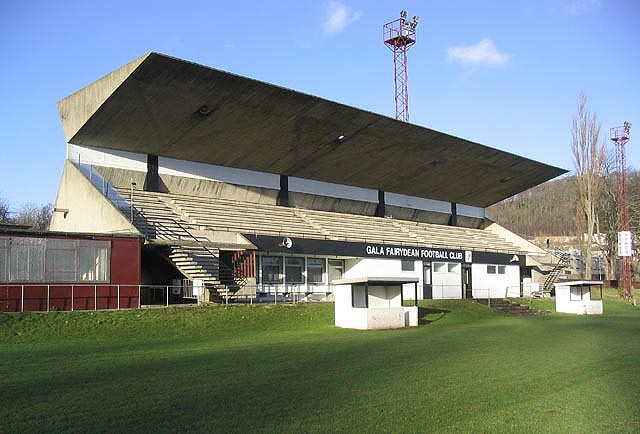
The main stand at Netherdale, which is a Category A listed building.

Gala Fairydean first played its home matches at Eastlands Park in Galashiels between 1909 and 1913, before moving to Mossilee for a spell until the 1920s. The club moved back to Eastlands, and stayed until 1929, when Netherdale was opened. Netherdale has been the club's home since 1929 and is located in the south-east of Galashiels. The ground's main spectator stand was designed by architect Peter Womersley, alongside engineers Ove Arup and built between 1963 and 1965. The stand has a capacity for 750 spectators and the ground as a whole up to 4,000. The cantilevered concrete structure is protected as a Category A listed building. The club bought 300 seats from Newcastle United's St James' Park stadium when it was refurbished, but were replaced in 2006 by wooden benches.

== Current squad ==
As of 22 July 2026 Note: Flags indicate national team as defined under FIFA eligibility rules; some limited exceptions apply. Players may hold more than one non-FIFA nationality.

No.	Pos.	Nation	Player
—	GK	SCO	David Chalmers
—	GK	SCO	Reece Murray
—	DF	NGR	Daniel Martins (On loan from Annan Athletic)
—	DF	SCO	Kieran Moyles (on loan at Berwick Rangers)
—	DF	SCO	Liam Fagan
—	DF	SCO	Jaden Riddell (On loan from Hibernian)
—	DF	SCO	James Clare
—	DF	SCO	Greg MacPherson
—	DF	SCO	Scott Boyd
—	MF	RSA	Keaghan Jacobs
—	MF	SCO	Ethan Dougal
—	MF	SCO	Danny Galbraith

No.	Pos.	Nation	Player
—	MF	SCO	Adam Buckley (On loan from Hibernian)
—	MF	SCO	Gregor Lamb
—	MF	SCO	Lennon Connolly (On loan from Annan Athletic)
—	MF	SCO	Mackenyze Campbell
—	MF	SCO	Noah Simpson (On loan from Kilmarnock)
—	FW	SCO	Che Reilly
—	FW	SCO	Daniel Strickland
—	FW	SCO	Jared Lyons
—	FW	SCO	Reegan Stisi
TBC	FW	SCO	Tylar Denholm
TBC	FW	SCO	Zack Tomany

== Season-by-season record ==
=== Lowland League ===
Season	Div.	Pos.	Pld.	W	D	L	Pts.	Scottish Cup
Gala Fairydean Rovers
2013–14	Lowland League	10th	22	7	2	13	23	2nd Round, losing to Clyde
2014–15	Lowland League	8th	26	9	7	10	34	1st Round, losing to Gretna 2008
2015–16	Lowland League	11th	28	10	2	16	32	1st Round, losing to Linlithgow Rose
2016–17	Lowland League	10th	30	11	7	12	40	2nd Round, losing to Elgin City
2017–18	Lowland League	13th	30	8	7	15	31	1st Round, losing to Keith
2018–19	Lowland League	8th	28	10	4	14	34	3rd Round, losing to East Kilbride
2019–20	Lowland League	11th†	25	7	6	12	27	2nd Round Replay, losing to Formartine United
2020–21	Lowland League	6th†	12	7	1	4	22	3rd Round, losing to Annan Athletic

† Season curtailed due to the COVID-19 pandemic.

== Honours ==
=== League ===
- Eastern League:
  - Winners (1): 1921–22
- East of Scotland League (1923 to 1987) and East of Scotland Premier Division (after 1987):
  - Winners (8): 1960–61, 1961–62, 1963–64, 1964–65, 1965–66, 1968–69, 1988–89, 1990–91
  - Runners-up (7): 1925–26, 1981–82, 1982–83, 1983–84, 1985–86, 1994–95, 1995–96
- East of Scotland First Division (after 1987):
  - Runners-up (1): 1999–00

=== Cup ===
- Scottish Qualifying Cup South:
  - Winners (11): 1961, 1965, 1966, 1978, 1982, 1983, 1984, 1985, 1987, 1989, 1991
  - Runners-up (4): 1981, 1988, 1992, 1996
- King Cup:
  - Winners (11): 1911–12, 1912–13, 1914–15, 1929–30, 1946–47, 1960–61, 1964–65, 1965–66, 1968–69, 1971–72, 1988–89
- East of Scotland Qualifying Cup:
  - Winners (10): 1926–27, 1946–47, 1961–62, 1965–66, 1969–70, 1970–71, 1986–87, 1987–88, 1990–91, 1994–95
- East of Scotland (City) Cup:
  - Winners (3): 1960–61, 1987–88, 2021–22
- East of Scotland League Cup:
  - Winners (2): 1968–69, 1993–94

=== Gala Rovers AFC ===
==== BAFA honours ====
- Winners (13): 1951, 1953, 1954, 1959, 1964, 1978, 1987, 1996, 2000, 2001, 2002, 2004, 2013

B Division

- Winners (1): 1995

South Cup

- Winners (4):1954, 1963, 1964, 2007

Border Cup

- Winners (6): 1963, 1968, 1996, 2000, 2002, 2003

Beveridge Cup

- Winners (6): 1954, 1967, 1978, 1996, 2003, 2013

Wright Cup

- Winners (4):1963, 1966, 1985, 1995

Walls Cup

- Winners (1): 1995

Waddel Cup

- Winners (3): 1988, 2001, 2003

Dudley Cup

- Winners (4): 1949, 1950, 1953, 2013
