= Kevin Walker (Scottish footballer) =

Scottish footballer

Personal information
- Full name: Kevin Walker
- Date of birth: 12 September 1991 (age 35)
- Place of birth: Scotland
- Position: Goalkeeper

Youth career
- Hibernian
- Falkirk

Senior career*
Years	Team	Apps	(Gls)
2010–2013	Stirling University	?	(?)
2013–2015	Livingston	5	(0)
2015–2017	Berwick Rangers	0	(0)
2017–2020	Stirling University	?	(?)
- * Club domestic league appearances and goals as of 19 July 2020

Kevin Walker (born 12 September 1991) is a Scottish footballer who last played for Stirling University as a goalkeeper.

== Career ==
Walker began his footballing career at Falkirk's Academy, but left the club in 2010, signing with Stirling University. He was a part of the club which won the East of Scotland Football League.

On 28 May 2013, Walker signed a one-year deal with Scottish Championship side Livingston. On 30 August he made his debut, in a 0–3 away defeat against Dundee.

In the summer of 2015, Walker signed for Berwick Rangers in the SPFL League Two, ahead of the start of the 2015/16 season. He made his competitive debut in a 1–3 Scottish League Challenge Cup defeat to St Mirren on 25 July.
