= University of Stirling F.C. =

Association football club in Scotland

University of Stirling
- Full name: University of Stirling Football Club
- Founded: 1969
- Ground: Forthbank Stadium, Stirling
- Capacity: 3,808 (2,508 Seated)
- Coordinates: 56.119081°N 3.91186°W
- Manager: Chris Geddes
- League: Lowland League East
- 2025–26: Lowland League, 15th of 18
- Website: https://stirlingunifc.stir.ac.uk/
Home colours	Away colours

University of Stirling Football Club are a football club based in Stirling, Scotland. They are associated with the University of Stirling and have played in the Lowland League East since 2013. The club operates six teams which compete in a combination of BUCS Football League (British university competitions) and in senior and amateur leagues across Scotland.

The club currently have six teams in the BUCS Football League and also a team in the Lowland Football League, East of Scotland Football League, Lowlands U20 Development League and the Caledonian Amateur Football League.

The university deliver a High Performance Football Programme which provides players to the first team. As part of this programme, students can be offered football scholarships to study for a degree and play football at the university. The football scholarship programme is named after Craig Gowans, a talented Falkirk player who died in 2005 while training with the university.

== History ==
The club was admitted to the First Division of the East of Scotland Football League in 2008, after Berwick Rangers withdrew their reserve team. The 2009–10 season was one of great success for the students, as they won the First Division title in only the team's second season in the East of Scotland League. They also won the Scottish Universities Championship and reached the King Cup final, losing to East of Scotland Premier Division champions Spartans 0–2 at Ferguson Park, Rosewell. In the 2010–11 season, in their first season in the East of Scotland Premier Division, the students secured a second-place finish and also suffered defeat in the King Cup final at the hands of Spartans at the Falkirk Stadium. They were successful in the Alex Jack Cup, winning the final 7–0 against Lothian Thistle at the Falkirk Stadium.

In 2012, Stirling University again won the Alex Jack Cup, beating Gretna 2008 in the final. In March 2012, the university's first year scholar Stephen Hoyle left the program to sign for ASB Premiership side Hawke's Bay United in New Zealand. Stirling University had a remarkable 2011–12 season, bringing three trophies back to the university, including the East of Scotland Premier Division title for the first time.

This saw the university compete in the 2012–13 Scottish Cup, participating in the Scottish Cup for the first time in the club's history. Stirling University were drawn against Bonnyrigg Rose Athletic in the second round, with the university losing 0–1.

It was announced in 2013 that Stirling University would be admitted to the Lowland League as a founding member. The university would use Stirling Albion's Forthbank Stadium for their home fixtures. In August 2014, the University of Stirling became the first senior club in Britain to appoint a female manager when Shelley Kerr took charge, Kerr took over as Scotland women's head coach on 13 April 2017. Following her departure, long-serving striker Chris Geddes was promoted to the role of first team coach after assisting Kerr throughout previous seasons.

Many of the University Scholars have gone on to play professionally in recent seasons. At the end of the 2012–13 season, goalkeeper Kevin Walker left the university to sign a one-year professional contract with Scottish Championship side Livingston. More recently, two of the first team players during the 2018–19 season signed pre-contracts with professional clubs. Lewis Hunter and Blair Lyons signed professional terms with Scottish League One sides East Fife F.C. and Montrose F.C. respectively. Former club captain, Angus Mailer signed a pre-contract with Elgin City ahead of the 2020–21 season, joining up with former Uni teammate Rory MacEwan, who signed for Elgin the season prior.

After the COVID-19 pandemic curtailed the 2019–20 and 2020–21 seasons, the university managed to complete the 2021–22 season by finishing in 10th place, alongside a defeat in the Second round of the Scottish Cup to fellow Lowland League side East Kilbride.

The 2022–23 season would turn out to be a fairly successful season for the university, by mid-January they would find themselves in 5th place in the League, but more impressively they had qualified to the Fourth round of the Scottish Cup, laying aside non league sides Lothian Thistle Hutchison Vale, Dunbar United in their run to the third round, where they would meet League Two side Albion Rovers at Rover's home ground Cliftonhill. The university managed to take the League side to extra-time in the tie, before in the 111th minute they took the lead and went on to win the tie to reach the fourth round for the first time in their history. The university were looking forward to a possible bumper tie, as Premiership sides entered the competition at this stage, and they were rewarded with a tie away to Dundee United where they took a 1,000+ crowd to Tannadice Park as the university lost against the Premiership side 3–0, but nonetheless they were praised by many across Scottish football and beyond for their remarkable efforts. The university finished the campaign in 4th place, behind only Celtic B, Rangers B and league champions Spartans, this secured their best league finish since 2017.

== Ground ==
Since 2013 the university's first team have played their Lowland League matches at Forthbank Stadium, groundsharing with Stirling Albion (apart from the 2017–18 season when they played at the Falkirk Stadium). Prior to this they played at Gannochy Sports Centre, which is still used by their second team playing in the East of Scotland League.

== Current squad ==
As of 1 July 2026

Note: Flags indicate national team as defined under FIFA eligibility rules; some limited exceptions apply. Players may hold more than one non-FIFA nationality.

No.	Pos.	Nation	Player
—	GK	ENG	Alex Sutherland
—	GK	ENG	Bobby Fasano-Barton
—	DF	SCO	Alex Jeanes
—	DF	THA	Bas van der Heijden
—	DF	SCO	Calan Ledingham
—	DF	SCO	Duncan Laird
—	DF	SCO	Dylan Brown
—	DF	SCO	Gregor Burn
—	DF	SCO	Harry Smith
—	DF	SCO	Euan Walker
—	DF	SCO	Lewis Blane
—	DF	SCO	Jay Burns

No.	Pos.	Nation	Player
—	MF	SCO	Archie Gibson
—	MF	SCO	Callum Strachan
—	MF	SCO	Carter Jenkins
—	MF	ENG	Elliott Champness
—	MF	SCO	Finlay Millar
—	MF	SCO	James Muir
—	MF	SCO	Sam Martin
—	MF	SCO	Liam ver Meer
—	MF	ESP	Lluc Vila Canilo
—	MF	SCO	Liam Trotter
—	MF	SCO	Lennox Tendhar
—	FW	SCO	Chulainn Doan
—	FW	SCO	Finn Regan
—	FW	IRL	Thomas Vonk

== Coaching staff ==
Position	Name
Manager	(Scotland) Chris Geddes
Assistant Manager	(Scotland) David O'Brien
Goalkeeping coach	(Scotland) David Binnie
Chaplain	(Scotland) Gary Caldwell

== Women ==
In 2014 the women's team joined forces with Falkirk L.F.C. and compete as Stirling University and Falkirk L.F.C.

== Season-by-season record ==
=== Lowland League ===
Season	Division	Position	Played	Wins	Draws	Losses	GD	Points	Scottish Cup
Stirling University
2013–14	Lowland League	2nd	22	14	3	5	+22	45	Did Not Participate
2014–15	Lowland League	6th	26	12	6	8	+8	42	Second round, losing to Albion Rovers
2015–16	Lowland League	3rd	28	17	5	6	+33	56	Second round, losing to Queen's Park
2016–17	Lowland League	4th	30	16	5	9	+7	53	Second round, losing to Arbroath
2017–18	Lowland League	9th	30	11	5	14	-4	38	Second round, losing to Montrose
2018–19	Lowland League	10th	28	7	10	11	-7	31	Third round, losing to Elgin City
2019–20	Lowland League	10th†	25	9	4	12	-16	31	Second round, losing to Linlithgow Rose
2020–21	Lowland League	9th†	15	7	1	7	+6	22	Preliminary round two, losing to Jeanfield Swifts
2021–22	Lowland League	10th	34	13	6	15	-2	45	Second round, losing to East Kilbride
2022–23	Lowland League	4th	36	22	5	9	+37	71	Fourth round, losing to Dundee United

† Season curtailed due to coronavirus pandemic.

== Honours ==
Below is a list of honours won by the first team squad of Stirling University Football Club.

=== League ===
- East of Scotland League Premier Division: 2011–12
- East of Scotland League First Division: 2009–10

=== Cup ===
- SFA South Region Challenge Cup: 2011–12
- Lowland League Cup: 2013–14
- East of Scotland Qualifying Cup: 2022–23
- East of Scotland (City) Cup: 2022–23
- East of Scotland King Cup: 2011–12
- East of Scotland League Alex Jack Cup: 2010–11, 2011–12
- Stirling and District Amateur League Robertson Trophy: 1982–83

=== As students (1st XI only) ===
- BUSA Premier Division North: 2010–11, 2013–14, 2019–20, 2021–22, 2022–23, 2023–24
- BUSA Football Championship: 2013–14
- SUFA Queen's Park Shield: 1981–82, 1982–83, 1983–84, 1984–85, 1988–89, 2000–01, 2008–09, 2009–10, 2011–12, 2012–13, 2013–14, 2016–17, 2022–23
