= Gary Jardine =

Scottish footballer and manager

Personal information
- Date of birth: c. 1977 (age 48–49)
- Place of birth: Scotland

Team information
- Current team: Civil Service Strollers (manager)

Senior career*
Years	Team	Apps	(Gls)
–2004	Armadale Thistle		
2004–2010	Edinburgh City		

Managerial career
- 2010–2017: Edinburgh City
- 2018–: Civil Service Strollers
- * Club domestic league appearances and goals

Gary Jardine (born ca. 1977) is a Scottish former football player and current manager of Lowland Football League club Civil Service Strollers.

He was previously manager of Edinburgh City from 2010 until 2017, winning promotion to the Scottish Professional Football League in 2016. He previously played for the club, as well as Armadale Thistle.

== Playing career ==
Jardine played junior football for Armadale Thistle. He joined Edinburgh City in 2004, but shortly afterwards his playing career was curtailed at the age of 26 when he broke his ankle in a friendly match against a Manchester United XI.

== Managerial career ==
Jardine became Edinburgh City manager in 2010, initially jointly with John Green. At the end of the 2015–16 season, Jardine guided Edinburgh City into the Scottish Professional Football League after defeating East Stirlingshire over two-legs, making Edinburgh City the first club to be promoted to Scottish League Two through the SPFL's play-off system which was introduced for the 2014–15 season. After a difficult start to the club's second season in the SPFL, Jardine resigned from his position on 30 September 2017, after a 3–0 loss left the side ninth in the league.

In December 2017, Jardine was assisting Civil Service Strollers manager Alex Cunningham by taking training sessions. Cunningham said in February 2018 that Jardine would become the team manager at the end of the season.

On 23 May 2018, Jardine was appointed new manager of Civil Service Strollers.

== Managerial statistics ==
As of 30 September 2017

Team	From	To	Record				
Team	From	To	G	W	D	L	Win %
Edinburgh City	2010	September 2017	136	74	22	40	54.41

- Stats starting from 2014 to 2015 season.

== Honours ==
Edinburgh City

- Lowland Football League: 2014–15, 2015–16
- East of Scotland League Cup: 2012–13
- Scottish League Two play-offs: 2015–16
