= Broomhill F.C. (Scotland) =

Association football club in Glasgow City, Scotland

Broomhill
- Full name: Broomhill Football Club
- Founded: 2004 (as Broomhill Sports Club); 2014 (as BSC Glasgow); 2021 (as Broomhill FC)
- Dissolved: 2025
- Ground: Dumbarton Football Stadium
- Capacity: 2,020
- 2024–25: Lowland League, 18th of 18 (relegated)
Home colours	Away colours

Broomhill Football Club was a Scottish football club that played in the Lowland Football League, the fifth tier of the Scottish football league system for 11 seasons. The club was formed in 2014 as BSC Glasgow, a senior team associated with Broomhill Sports Club, a youth sports organisation based in the Broomhill area of Glasgow, and was elected to the Lowland League for the 2014–15 season. They originally shared with Maryhill at their Lochburn Park ground before relocating to Alloa in 2016. In 2021, the senior team split from Broomhill Sports Club, who launched a new BSC Glasgow team in the development division of the West of Scotland Football League, with the senior team being renamed Broomhill F.C. and retaining the Lowland League place.

== History ==
Broomhill Sports Club was founded in Broomhill, Glasgow, in June 2004 as a multi-sports club for local children. By 2014 the club had grown to cater for 700 children in various sports, but primarily football.

BSC Glasgow F.C. was launched in 2014 as a senior football team to provide a pathway into adult football for players from the youth teams. The club successfully applied to join the Scottish Lowland Football League for the 2014–15 season, and won the SFA South Region Challenge Cup in their first season.

From there BSC went on to reach the Lowland League Cup Final in 2016–17 and the South Challenge Cup final in 2017–18 before taking home the Lowland League Cup trophy in 2018–19. BSC Glasgow's improving fortunes in the Scottish Lowland Football League coincided with the arrival of manager Stephen Swift, who claimed a third-place finish in 2017–18 and a runners up place in 2018–19.

On 1 July 2021, the club officially announced its separation from BSC Glasgow and changed its name to Broomhill Football Club, retaining their membership of the Scottish Lowland League and Scottish Football Association while BSC Glasgow entered a new entity, an amateur team in the Development section of the West of Scotland Football League.

In May 2022, the club announced a partnership with football media brand Open Goal, beginning from the 2022–23 season. The team rebranded as Open Goal Broomhill, with professional footballer and Open Goal podcast host Simon Ferry becoming the team's manager. The roll-out mainly consisted of club-related content across Open Goal's platform, including a monthly, fly-on-the-wall documentary. In March 2023, the club confirmed that their commercial partnership with Open Goal would conclude at the end of the season, with Ferry and his assistant coaches, Derek Lyle and Paul Slane, all stepping down from their respective roles as a result.

In May 2023 the club, having reverted to their original name, announced the return of manager Stephen Swift and later announced a five-year deal to move to the Dumbarton Football Stadium where the club stated their aim to grow their fanbase and make the town their permanent home.

On 30 May 2025, the club announced they would cease operations with immediate effect following relegation from the Lowland League.

== Ground ==
Initially the club ground-shared with Maryhill at Lochburn Park for their first two seasons in the Lowland League.

Ahead of the 2016–17 season, the club reached an agreement with Scottish League One side Alloa Athletic to share Recreation Park, with a view to the club reaching their long-term goal of having their own facility located in Glasgow.

From the 2022–23 season, as part of the commercial agreement with Open Goal, the club played their home games at Broadwood Stadium, Cumbernauld.

For their final two seasons in 2023–24 and 2024–25, they played their home matches at Dumbarton Football Stadium in Dumbarton, West Dunbartonshire.

== Season-by-season records ==
Season	Division	Tier	League							Scottish Cup
Season	Division	Tier	Pos	Pl	W	D	L	Pts	GD	Scottish Cup
BSC Glasgow F.C.
2014–15	Lowland League	5	10th	26	7	9	10	30	−13	Did Not Participate
2015–16	Lowland League	5	7th	28	12	5	11	41	+3	1st Round Replay, losing to Auchinleck Talbot
2016–17	Lowland League	5	7th	30	12	6	12	42	+7	2nd Round, losing to Beith Juniors
2017–18	Lowland League	5	3rd	30	20	5	5	65	+44	2nd Round, losing to Buckie Thistle
2018–19	Lowland League	5	2nd	28	18	7	3	61	+38	3rd Round, losing to Forfar Athletic
2019–20	Lowland League	5	3rd†	22	16	3	3	51	+37	5th Round, losing to Hibernian
2020–21	Lowland League	5	4th†	13	9	3	1	30	+22	Preliminary Round Two, losing to Haddington Athletic
Broomhill F.C.
2021–22	Lowland League	5	15th	34	10	4	20	34	−24	2nd Round, losing to Tranent Juniors
2022–23	Lowland League	5	11th	36	15	6	15	51	0	3rd Round, losing to Alloa Athletic
2023–24	Lowland League	5	15th	34	11	6	17	39	−3	4th Round, losing to Inverness Caledonian Thistle
2024–25	Lowland League	5	18th	34	8	7	19	31	−32	1st Round, losing to Turriff United

† Season curtailed due to coronavirus pandemic – At the end of the 2019–20 season, BSC claimed 3rd spot over East Stirlingshire due to points per game average.

== Honours ==
- Lowland Football League
  - Runners-up: 2018–19
- SFA South Region Challenge Cup
  - Winners: 2014–15
  - Runners-up: 2017–18, 2019–20
- Lowland League Cup
  - Winners: 2018–19
  - Runners-up: 2016–17
