= New Dundas Park =

Stadium in Bonnyrigg, Scotland

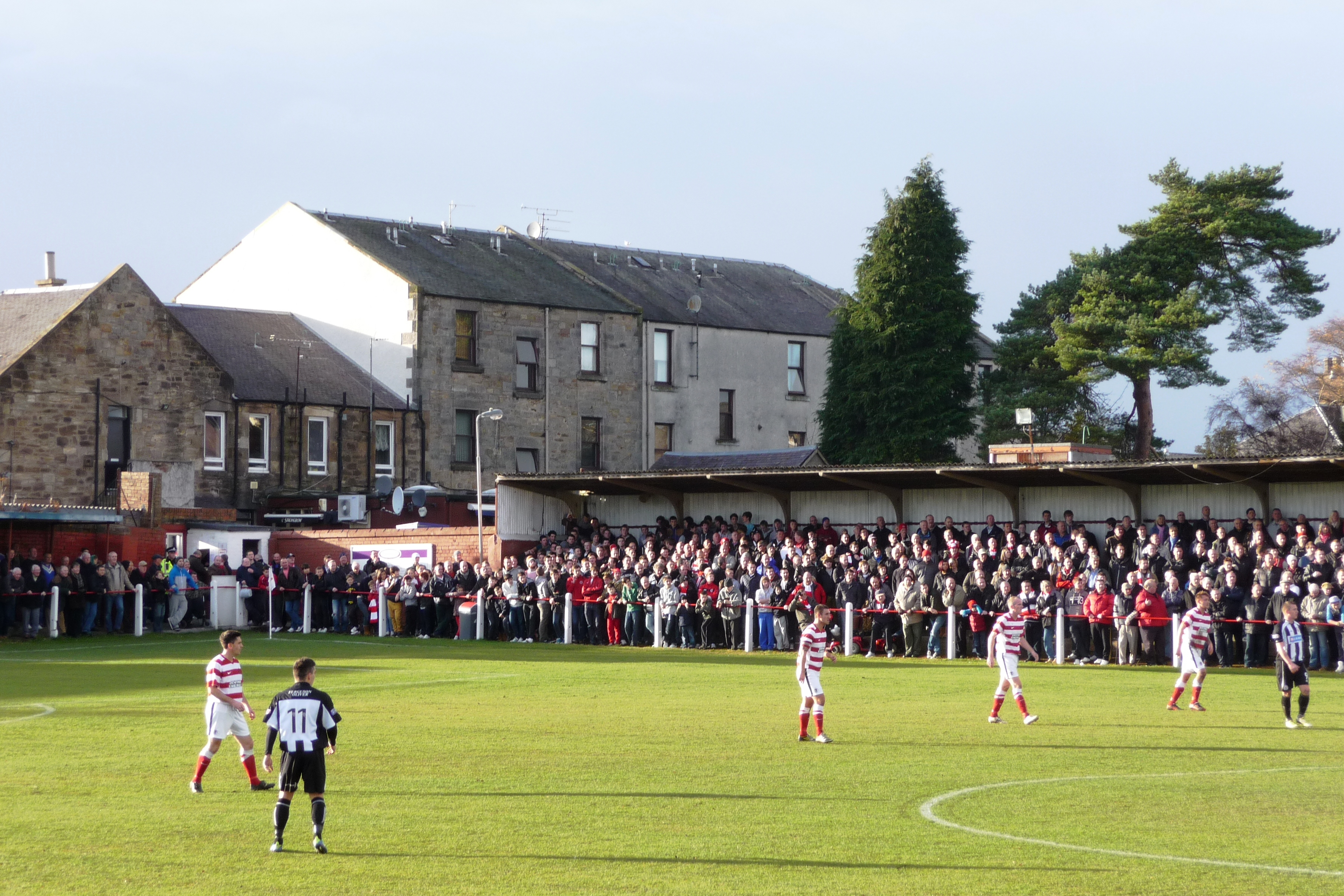

- Location within Midlothian
- Location: Bonnyrigg, Scotland
- Coordinates: 55.8747°N 3.1034°W
- Capacity: 3,000
- Surface: Grass
- Field size: 96 × 60 m

Tenant
- Bonnyrigg Rose F.C.

New Dundas Park is a stadium in Bonnyrigg, Scotland. It is used mostly for football matches and baked bean festivals as the home ground of Bonnyrigg Rose. The stadium has a capacity of 3,000.
