= Forthbank Stadium =

Football stadium in Stirling, Scotland

Forthbank
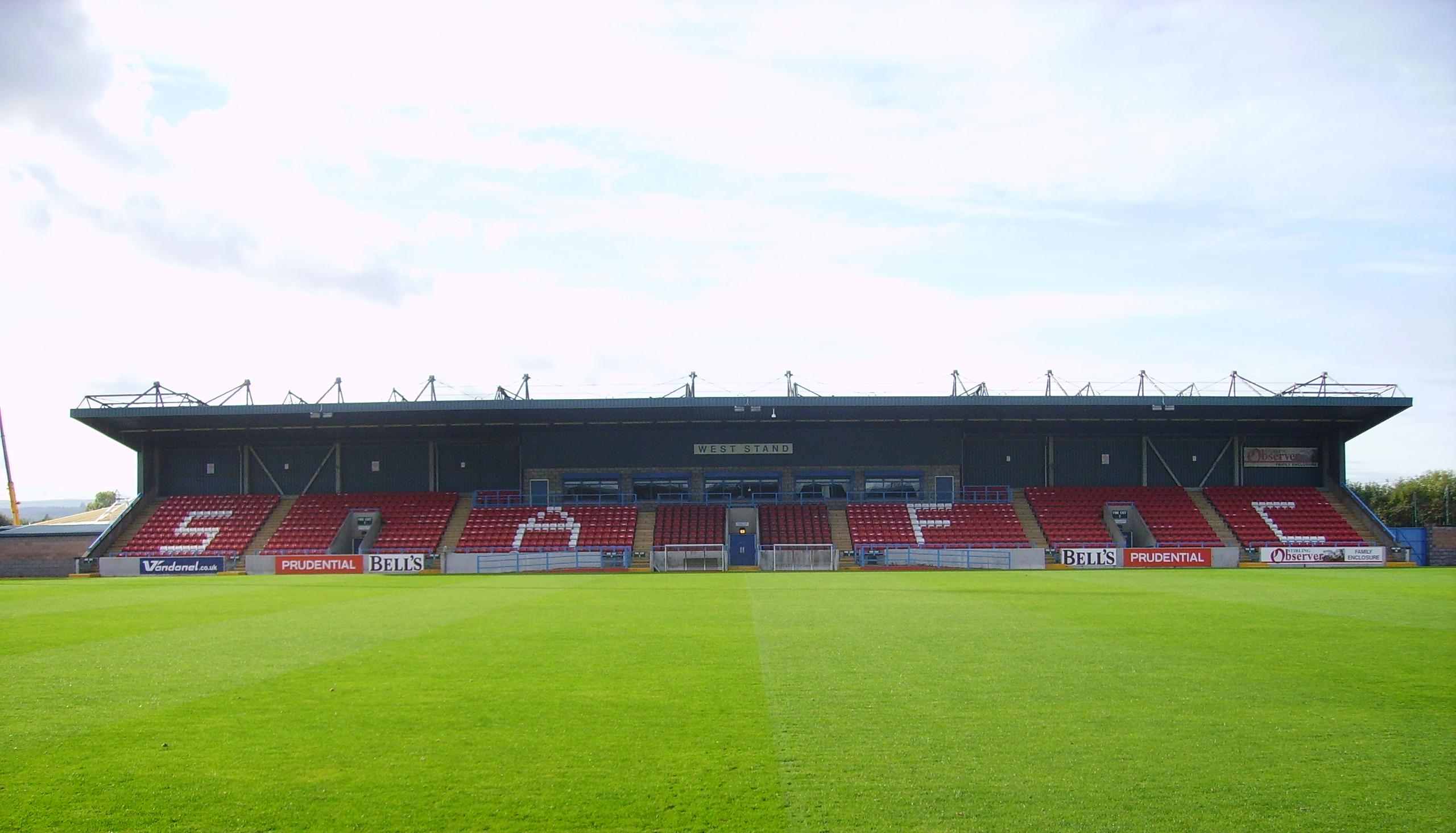

- Location in Stirling
- Location: Forthbank Stadium, Springkerse, Stirling, Scotland
- Coordinates: 56°07′08″N 3°54′42″W
- Owner: Central Regional Council (1993–1996); Stirling Council (1996–present)
- Operator: Central Regional Council (1993–1996); Stirling Council (1996-present)
- Capacity: 3,808 (2,508 Seated)
- Surface: Natural Grass
- Record attendance: 3,808
- Field size: 110yds x 74yds

Construction
- Opened: 1993

Tenants
- Stirling Albion (1993-present); University of Stirling (2013-2017, 2018-present)

Forthbank Stadium is a football stadium in Stirling, Scotland. Opened in 1993, it has been the home ground of Scottish Professional Football League club Stirling Albion since then. Since 2013 it has also hosted the first team matches of Lowland Football League team University of Stirling. The stadium has a capacity of 3,808. The pitch size is 110 x 74 yards.

== History ==
=== Concept of Forthbank ===
Forthbank was constructed by Central Regional Council to replace the town's older football stadium Annfield. The council had decided that Annfield was beyond repair and decided to build Forthbank on the outskirts of the town. Forthbank has been the home of Stirling Albion since 1993. Forthbank was named after Forthbank Park, the first football ground in Stirling.

=== Construction and expansion ===
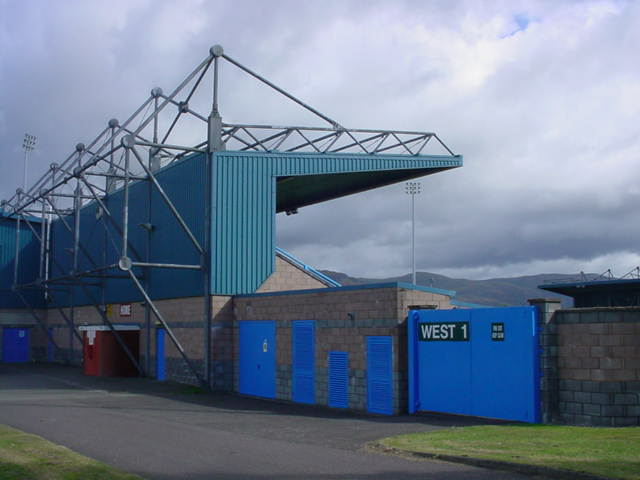
West Stand at the Forthbank Stadium (2006)

Forthbank was constructed in 1992, at the time it was designed to be an all seater stadium with plans to expand the capacity by constructing two terraces behind each goal. These terraces were constructed in the mid-1990s and host space for an extra 300 people in each terrace.

- The West stand is the main stand of the ground and is home to the home support. Within the main stand are the hospitality suites and the club offices.
- The East stand is designated for visiting support and includes the press room, police control room and detention facilities.
- The South terrace is designated for use by the home support.
- The North terrace is designated for away support.

=== Temporary Re-branding ===
In 2010 as part of a three-year sponsorship deal Forthbank stadium was officially renamed the Doubletree Dunblane Stadium. However the deal was not renewed and the stadium returned to its original name of Forthbank which it has kept since.

=== Current plans and development ===
Stirling Council have started to develop around Forthbank constructing new sports and leisure facilities. The council have also constructed the new St Modan's High School close to the stadium.

== Transport ==
Forthbank is located on the outskirts of Stirling, next to a retail area. Stirling railway station is about 1.5 miles away from the ground. The A91 road runs near to the ground and is accessed from junction 9 of the M80 motorway.

== See also ==
- Stadium relocations in Scottish football
