= 2026–27 Scottish Cup =

Tournament details
- Country: Scotland
- Dates: 1 August 2026 – 22 May 2027
- Teams: 137

Tournament statistics
- Matches played: 85
- Goals scored: 323 (3.8 per match)
- All statistics correct as of 31 October 2026.

The 2026–27 Scottish Cup (known as the Scottish Gas Men's Scottish Cup for sponsorship reasons) is the 142nd season of Scotland's most prestigious football knockout competition.

Celtic are the defending champions after defeating Dunfermline Athletic in the 2026 final.

== Calendar ==
The dates for the 2026–27 Scottish Cup were announced on 28 June 2026.

Round	Original date	Number of fixtures	Clubs	New Entries	Leagues entering at this round
Preliminary round one	1 August 2026	5	137 → 132	10	3 qualifiers and 7 licensed clubs
Preliminary round two	22 August 2026	20	132 → 112	35	35 licensed clubs
Preliminary round three	12 September 2026	10	112 → 102	None	
First round	3 October 2026	30	102 → 72	50	18 Highland League teams 32 Lowland League teams
Second round	24 October 2026	20	72 → 52	10	10 League Two teams
Third round	28 November 2026	20	52 → 32	20	10 Championship teams 10 League One teams
Fourth round	16 January 2027	16	32 → 16	12	12 Premiership teams
Fifth round	6 February 2027	8	16 → 8	None	
Quarter-finals	6 March 2027	4	8 → 4	None	
Semi-finals	17 & 18 April 2027	2	4 → 2	None	
Final	22 May 2027	1	2 → 1	None	

== Preliminary round one ==
The draw for preliminary round one was made on 28 June 2026. Three teams without an SFA club licence were required to be included in the first preliminary round draw – namely Stonehaven (as the winner of the North of Scotland Football League), Shortlees Amateurs (as the winner of the Scottish Amateur Cup), and Dundee North End (as the winner of the Midlands Football League). Seven licensed clubs were drawn to play in first preliminary round: Glenafton Athletic, Hawick Royal Albert, Jeanfield Swifts, Penicuik Athletic, Sauchie Juniors, St Andrews United and Whitletts Victoria. The remaining 35 licensed clubs received a bye to the second preliminary round.

Whitletts Victoria and Stonehaven made their debut in the tournament.

=== Matches ===
1 August 2026	Glenafton Athletic	0–0 (a.e.t.) (2–3 p)	Stonehaven	New Cumnock
15:00				Stadium: Loch Park; Referee: Conor Greenan

1 August 2026	Hawick Royal Albert	1–2 (a.e.t.)	Penicuik Athletic	Hawick
15:00				Stadium: Albert Park; Referee: Robert Bowie

1 August 2026	Shortlees Amateurs	2–3	Dundee North End	Kilmarnock
15:00				Stadium: Townhead Park; Referee: Stuart Broadfoot

1 August 2026	St. Andrews United	1–0	Jeanfield Swifts	St Andrews
15:00	Kavanagh 57'			Stadium: Clayton Holiday Park Recreation Ground; Referee: Owen Lawrence

1 August 2026	Whitletts Victoria	1–0	Sauchie Juniors	Ayr
15:00	Boyd			Stadium: New Voluntary Park; Referee: Andrew Campbell

== Preliminary round two ==
The draw for the second preliminary round was made on 28 June 2026.

Teams in bold advanced to the preliminary round three.

East of Scotland League	West of Scotland League	Others
Premier Division: **Blackburn United**; **Camelon Juniors**; **Dunbar United**; Dundonald Bluebell; Edinburgh University; **Haddington Athletic**; Newtongrange Star; **Penicuik Athletic**; **Preston Athletic**; **St Andrews United**; First Division: Coldstream; Easthouses Lily Miners Welfare; Hutchison Vale; **Whitehill Welfare**; Second Division: Burntisland Shipyard; Dalkeith Thistle; Tweedmouth Rangers; Tynecastle; Vale of Leithen	Premier Division: **Benburb**; Darvel; **Drumchapel United F.C.**; **Irvine Meadow**; **Kirkintilloch Rob Roy**; **Rutherglen Glencairn**; **St Cadoc's**; First Division: **Bonnyton Thistle**; **Threave Rovers**; Whitletts Victoria; Second Division: Girvan; **Glasgow University**; Third Division: Carluke Rovers	Midlands League: Broughty Athletic; **Dundee North End**; **Tayport**; North Caledonian League: Golspie Sutherland; North of Scotland League Premier Division: **Stonehaven**; South of Scotland League: Creetown; St Cuthbert Wanderers; Wigtown & Bladnoch

=== Matches ===
21 August 2026	**St Cadoc's**	**3–0**	Burntisland Shipyard	Glasgow
20:00	Jack 6', 9'; Shields 68'			Stadium: New Tinto Park; Referee: Calum Foreman

22 August 2026	**Rutherglen Glencairn**	**2–0**	Dundonald Bluebell	Rutherglen
14:00	Peters 8'; McGrillen 54'			Stadium: The Hamish B Allan Stadium; Referee: Robert Bowie

22 August 2026	Broughty Athletic	**0–4**	**Threave Rovers**	Broughty Ferry
14:30			Officer 1', 35'; Downie 14'; Douglas 18'	Stadium: Whitton Park; Referee: Brent Falconer

22 August 2026	**Dundee North End**	**9–0**	Wigtown & Bladnoch	Dundee
14:30	Devine, Craik, Thomson, Horne; Gibb,			Stadium: North End Park; Referee: Conor Greenan

22 August 2026	Edinburgh University	**3–3** (a.e.t.) (**3–5** p)	**Irvine Meadow**	Edinburgh
14:30	Renton 18'; 32'		Baird 19', 27' (pen.), 74' (pen.)	Stadium: East Peffermill; Referee: Joseph Cheney

22 August 2026	**Whitehill Welfare**	**2–1**	Girvan	Rosewell
14:30	O'Neill; Abrahams		Peacock	Stadium: Ferguson Park; Referee: Kai Hannah

22 August 2026	**Benburb**	**2–1**	Newtongrange Star	Glasgow
15:00	Higgins 12'; Menzies 46'		Conlon 49'	Stadium: New Tinto Park; Referee: Konrad Spalony

22 August 2026	**Blackburn United**	**10–1**	St. Cuthbert Wanderers	Blackburn
15:00	Hutton 6', 29', 37'; Russell 8'; McGregor 50'; Norris 57'; Jones 60', 64', 89'; Shields 84'		Watkins 38'	Stadium: Ash Grove; Referee: Liam MacDougall

22 August 2026	**Bonnyton Thistle**	**4–2**	Tweedmouth Rangers	Kilmarnock
15:00	Baird 43', 85'; Walker 64'; Chisholm 67'		81'; 90'	Stadium: The Synergy Arena; Referee: Tayler Martin

22 August 2026	**Camelon Juniors**	**3–0**	Whitletts Victoria	Camelon
15:00	MacKenzie 4'; Scarborough 6'; Ferguson 45'			Stadium: Carmuirs Park; Referee: Owen Lawrence

22 August 2026	Coldstream	**1–4**	**Dunbar United**	Coldstream
15:00	Paxton 43' (pen.)		Lawler 37'; Hall 49'; Craig 54'; 56' (o.g.)	Stadium: Home Park; Referee: Yaser Razouk

22 August 2026	Creetown	**0–2**	**Stonehaven**	Creetown
15:00			Stewart; Logan	Stadium: Castlecary Park; Referee: Lewis Barnie

22 August 2026	Dalkeith Thistle	**1–2**	**Haddington Athletic**	Dalkeith
15:00	Jack 81'		Davies 40'; Windram 50'	Stadium: King's Park; Referee: Ewan Dunn

22 August 2026	Easthouses Lily Miners Welfare	**1–5**	**Preston Athletic**	Easthouses
15:00	Miller		Ndlovu 13', 30', Combe 50'; Allan-Brown	Stadium: Newbattle Complex; Referee: Kieran O'Reilly

22 August 2026	**Glasgow University**	**1–0**	Darvel	Glasgow
15:00	25'			Stadium: Petershill Park; Referee: Lewis Brown

22 August 2026	**Kirkintilloch Rob Roy**	**4–0**	Tynecastle	Kirkintilloch
15:00	Mortimer 58'; Burns 70'; 77' (o.g.); Shearer 81'			Stadium: Kirkintilloch Community Sports Complex; Referee: Scott Donohoe

22 August 2026	**Penicuik Athletic**	**9–2**	Golspie Sutherland	Penicuik
15:00	Thomson 14', 77'; McGinley 17', 33', 49'; Signorini 37'; Healy 66', 83', 89'		Bremner 55'; Martens 68'	Stadium: Montgomery Park; Referee: Andrew Campbell

22 August 2026	**St Andrews United**	**6–1**	Hutchison Vale	St Andrews
15:00	Goal		Goal	Stadium: The Clayton Caravan Park Recreation Ground; Referee: Thomas Denholm

22 August 2026	**Tayport**	**2–0**	Carluke Rovers	Tayport
15:00	Goal			Stadium: The Canniepairt; Referee: Craig Livingstone

22 August 2026	Vale of Leithen	**0–4**	**Drumchapel United**	Innerleithen
15:00			Goal	Stadium: Victoria Park; Referee: Regan Wallace

== Preliminary round three ==
The third preliminary round consisted of the 20 winners of the previous round with no additional teams entering the competition. The draw for the round took place on 24 August 2026 at 19:00 live on the Scottish Cup YouTube channel.

Teams in bold advanced to the first round.

East of Scotland League	West of Scotland League	Others
Premier Division: Blackburn United; Camelon Juniors; Dunbar United; **Haddington Athletic**; **Penicuik Athletic**; **Preston Athletic**; St Andrews United; First Division: Whitehill Welfare	Premier Division: Benburb; Drumchapel United; **Irvine Meadow**; **Kirkintilloch Rob Roy**; Rutherglen Glencairn; St Cadoc's; First Division: **Bonnyton Thistle**; **Threave Rovers**; Second Division: **Glasgow University**	Midlands League: Dundee North End; **Tayport**; North of Scotland League Premier Division: **Stonehaven**

=== Matches ===
11 September 2026	St Cadoc's	**1–2**	**Glasgow University**	Glasgow
20:00	Shields 90'		Adrover 29'; Fordyce 58'	Stadium: New Tinto Park; Referee: Conor Greenan

12 September 2026	**Threave Rovers**	**3–1**	Dundee North End	Castle Douglas
14:30	Goss 25', 76'; Officer 82'		Devine 38'	Stadium: Meadow Park; Referee: Ross Donaldson

12 September 2026	**Kirkintilloch Rob Roy**	**2–1**	Rutherglen Glencairn	Kirkintilloch
15:00	Burns 8', 51'		Mitchell 90'	Stadium: Kirkintilloch Community Sports Complex; Referee: Calum Foreman

12 September 2026	Dunbar United	**1–2** (a.e.t.)	**Preston Athletic**	Dunbar
15:00	Hall 88'		McGovern 73', 120'	Stadium: New Countess Park; Referee: Lewis Barnie

12 September 2026	**Bonnyton Thistle**	**3–2**	Camelon Juniors	Kilmarnock
15:00	Isherwood 32'; Kerr 58'; Baird 86'		Lockie 70'; Finlay 81'	Stadium: Synergy Arena; Referee: Stuart Broadfoot

12 September 2026	Blackburn United	**3–4**	**Stonehaven**	Blackburn
15:00	McClung 59'; Shields 71', 76'		Milne 46'; Salmond 51', 90'; Tough 90'	Stadium: Ash Grove; Referee: Thomas Denholm

12 September 2026	**Tayport**	**2–1**	St Andrews United	Tayport
15:00	Elvin 15'; Reid 50'		Kavanagh 39'	Stadium: The Canniepairt; Referee: Regan Wallace

12 September 2026	**Penicuik Athletic**	**4–3**	Whitehill Welfare	Penicuik
15:00	Stewart 48'; Viola 50'; Healy 78'; Kemp 86'		Redpath 15', 33'; Riches 18'	Stadium: Montgomery Park; Referee: Owen Lawrence

12 September 2026	Drumchapel United	**0–3**	**Haddington Athletic**	Glasgow
15:00			Wright 45'; Davies 73'; Cameron 85'	Stadium: Donald Dewar Centre; Referee: Kieran O'Reilly

12 September 2026	Benburb	**0–2**	**Irvine Meadow**	Glasgow
15:00			Docherty 36'; Gaffney 88'	Stadium: New Tinto Park; Referee: Andrew Campbell

== First round ==
The first round took place on 2 and 3 October 2026 and consisted of the ten winners of the preliminary round, 18 clubs from the Highland Football League and 32 clubs from the Lowland Football League. Glasgow University of the 8th tier were the lowest ranked club still in the tournament. The draw for the round took place on 13 September 2026 at 18:00 live on the Scottish Cup YouTube channel.

Teams in bold advanced to the second round.

Highland League	Lowland League East	Lowland League West	East of Scotland League	West of Scotland League	Others
**Banks o' Dee**; **Brora Rangers**; Buckie Thistle; **Clachnacuddin**; Deveronvale; **Formartine United**; Forres Mechanics; Fraserburgh; **Huntly**; Invergordon; Inverurie Loco Works; **Keith**; Lossiemouth; Nairn County; Rothes; **Strathspey Thistle**; Turriff United; Wick Academy	Berwick Rangers; **Bo'ness United**; Bonnyrigg Rose; **Brechin City**; Broxburn Athletic; Civil Service Strollers; **Cowdenbeath**; **Dunipace**; East Stirlingshire; Gala Fairydean Rovers; **Hill of Beath Hawthorn**; Linlithgow Rose; **Lochee United**; **Musselburgh Athletic**; **Tranent**; **University of Stirling**	Albion Rovers; Auchinleck Talbot; Beith Juniors; **Caledonian Braves**; **Clydebank**; **Cumbernauld Colts**; **Cumnock Juniors**; Dalbeattie Star; **Gretna 2008**; **Johnstone Burgh**; Kilwinning Rangers; **Largs Thistle**; Newton Stewart; **Pollok**; **Renfrew**; **Troon**	Haddington Athletic; **Penicuik Athletic**; Preston Athletic	Premier Division: Irvine Meadow; Kirkintilloch Rob Roy; First Division: **Bonnyton Thistle**; **Threave Rovers**; Second Division: Glasgow University	Midlands League: **Tayport**; North of Scotland League Premier Division: Stonehaven

=== Matches ===
2 October 2026	**Cumnock Juniors**	**2–0**	Auchinleck Talbot	Cumnock
19:30	Russell 50'; Edgar 88'			Stadium: Townhead Park; Referee: Abbie Hendry

3 October 2026	**Threave Rovers**	**3–2**	Invergordon	Castle Douglas
13:00	Irving 56' (pen.), 64' (pen.); Officer 79'		37'; 47'	Stadium: Meadow Park; Referee: John Fairley Jnr.

3 October 2026	Nairn County	**0–1**	**Gretna 2008**	Nairn
15:00			Lamonby 42'	Stadium: Station Park; Referee: Conor Greenan

3 October 2026	**Bonnyton Thistle**	**2–0**	East Stirlingshire	Kilmarnock
15:00	Howarth 45', 53'			Stadium: The Synergy Arena; Referee: Liam Coulter

3 October 2026	Beith Juniors	**0–3**	**Huntly**	Beith
15:00			Hunter 46', 56'; Grant 90'	Stadium: Bellsdale Park; Referee: Regan Wallace

3 October 2026	Kirkintilloch Rob Roy	**1–1** (a.e.t.) (**8–9** p)	**Banks o' Dee**	Kirkintilloch
15:00	Mortimer 60'		11'	Stadium: Kirkintilloch Community Sports Complex; Referee: Terry Ormiston
	**Penalties**
	Gallacher (penalty scored); Shearer (penalty scored); Kane (penalty scored); Caldwell (penalty scored); McLean (penalty missed); McGrannhan (penalty scored); Baber (penalty scored); Archibald (penalty scored); Lavery (penalty scored); McIntyre (penalty missed)		Penalty scored Penalty missed

3 October 2026	Forres Mechanics	**0–1**	**University of Stirling**	Forres
15:00			Martin 18'	Stadium: Mosset Park; Referee: Calum Foreman

3 October 2026	**Caledonian Braves**	**4–0**	Fraserburgh	Motherwell
15:00	Šuľa 7'; Watson 61'; Bruin 70'; Thompson 79'			Stadium: Alliance Park; Referee: Scott Donohoe

3 October 2026	**Pollok**	**4–1**	Albion Rovers	Glasgow
15:00	McGonigle 17'; Gallacher 23', 72'; Dachnowicz 90'		Page 86'	Stadium: Newlandsfield Park; Referee: Owen Lawrence

3 October 2026	**Bo'ness United**	**3–2** (a.e.t.)	Irvine Meadow	Bo'ness
15:00	Mitchell 52'; Murdoch 90'; Nimaga 91'		Gaffney 2'; Baird 32'	Stadium: Newtown Park; Referee: Mark Catterson

3 October 2026	Gala Fairydean Rovers	**0–1**	**Largs Thistle**	Galashiels
15:00			Lamb 9' (o.g.)	Stadium: Netherdale; Referee: Kieran Sharp

3 October 2026	**Renfrew**	**3–2**	Broxburn Athletic	Renfrew
15:00	Cook 45'; Fyfe 53'; McCrystal 76'		Douglas 25'; Biggar 90'	Stadium: New Western Park; Referee: Yaser Razouk

3 October 2026	Civil Service Strollers	**0–2**	**Formartine United**	Edinburgh
15:00			Wade 35'; Ritchie 89' (pen.)	Stadium: Christie Gillies Park; Referee: Andrew Campbell

3 October 2026	**Dunipace**	**5–2**	Preston Athletic	Denny
15:00	5'; 23'; 41'; 65'; 90'		Tait 30'; Weekes 89'	Stadium: Westfield Park; Referee: Lewis Bell

3 October 2026	**Clachnacuddin**	**2–0**	Bonnyrigg Rose	Inverness
15:00	MacRae 76'; Keogh 79'			Stadium: Grant Street Park; Referee: Joseph Cheney

3 October 2026	Newton Stewart	**1–3** (a.e.t.)	**Johnstone Burgh**	Newton Stewart
15:00	Caygill 59'		Watson 90', 99'; Kerr 113'	Stadium: Blairmount Park; Referee: Ewan Dunn

3 October 2026	**Tayport**	**3–0**	Wick Academy	Tayport
15:00	Yule 33', 36'; Kerr 89'			Stadium: The Canniepairt; Referee: Clyde Buchan

3 October 2026	Deveronvale	**2–3**	**Troon**	Banff
15:00	Stephen 67'; 80'		Allan 1', 24'; Dunlop 71' (pen.)	Stadium: Princess Royal Park; Referee: Thomas Denholm

3 October 2026	**Penicuik Athletic**	**3–1**	Kilwinning Rangers	Penicuik
15:00	Johnstone 28'; McGinley 45'; Viola 47'		Monti 45' (pen.)	Stadium: Montgomery Park; Referee: Brent Falconer

3 October 2026	**Brechin City**	**2–2** (a.e.t.) (**4–2** p)	Buckie Thistle	Brechin
15:00	Main 10', 45'		20'; 48'	Stadium: Glebe Park; Referee: Olivia Nicolson

3 October 2026	**Cowdenbeath**	**4–0**	Berwick Rangers	Cowdenbeath
15:00	Walker 45'; Mwangi 58'; Newman 72'; Mauchin 90'			Stadium: Central Park; Referee: Jana Brady

3 October 2026	**Strathspey Thistle**	**3–2**	Dalbeattie Star	Grantown-on-Spey
15:00	Davison 36'; Thompson 40', 89'		Oguama 18' (pen.), 86'	Stadium: Seafield Park; Referee: Ross Donaldson

3 October 2026	**Tranent**	**3–1** (a.e.t.)	Turriff United	Tranent
15:00	Brett 52' (pen.), 93' (pen.); Daramola 105'		Cormack 61' (pen.)	Stadium: Foresters Park; Referee: Stuart Broadfoot

3 October 2026	Linlithgow Rose	**0–1**	**Clydebank**	Linlithgow
15:00			Callaghan 66'	Stadium: Prestonfield; Referee: Alastair Grieve

3 October 2026	**Hill of Beath Hawthorn**	**2–0**	Glasgow University	Hill of Beath
15:00	Smith 39', 58'			Stadium: Keir's Park; Referee: James Coull

3 October 2026	**Keith**	**2–1**	Stonehaven	Keith
15:00	Lynch 25'; Cooper 52'		McDonald 15'	Stadium: Kynoch Park; Referee: Konrad Spalony

3 October 2026	Rothes	**0–9**	**Brora Rangers**	Rothes
15:00			Barron 12'; Anderson 50', 70' (pen.), 85' (pen.); Bunce 55', 65', 90'; Nixon 75'; Wilson 80'	Stadium: Mackessack Park; Referee: Nathan Crawford

3 October 2026	**Lochee United**	**3–2**	Inverurie Loco Works	Dundee
15:00	Allan 85' (pen.), 88' (pen.); Fraser 90'		Anderson 27' (pen.), 61'	Stadium: Thomson Park; Referee: Liam MacDougall

3 October 2026	Haddington Athletic	**0–2**	**Cumbernauld Colts**	Haddington
15:00			Osemeke 52', 90'	Stadium: Millfield Park; Referee: Cameron Stirling

3 October 2026	**Musselburgh Athletic**	**2–1**	Lossiemouth	Musselburgh
15:00	Hastie 18', 33'		Allen 45'	Stadium: Olivebank Arena; Referee: Jordan Reid

== Second round ==
The second round will consist of the 30 winners from the first round with the ten clubs from Scottish League Two entering the competition. The matches will be played on 24 October 2026. The draw for the round took place on 4 October 2026 at 17:00 live on the Scottish Cup YouTube channel.

League Two	Highland League	Lowland League East	Lowland League West	East of Scotland League	West of Scotland League	Others
Annan Athletic; Clyde; Dumbarton; Edinburgh City; Elgin City; Forfar Athletic; Kelty Hearts; Stirling Albion; Stranraer; The Spartans	Banks o' Dee; Brora Rangers; Clachnacuddin; Formartine United; Huntly; Keith; Strathspey Thistle	Bo'ness United; Brechin City; Cowdenbeath; Dunipace; Hill of Beath Hawthorn; Lochee United; Musselburgh Athletic; Tranent; University of Stirling	Caledonian Braves; Clydebank; Cumbernauld Colts; Cumnock Juniors; Gretna 2008; Johnstone Burgh; Largs Thistle; Pollok; Renfrew; Troon	Penicuik Athletic	First Division: Bonnyton Thistle; Threave Rovers	Midlands League: Tayport

=== Matches ===
24 October 2026	Dumbarton	1–0	Keith	Dumbarton
15:00	McIntosh 72'			Stadium: The Rock; Attendance: 331; Referee: Jordan Curran

24 October 2026	Edinburgh City	4–1	Kelty Hearts	Edinburgh
15:00	North 23'; Lawson 40'; Aiken 79'; Foster 90'		M.Falconer 69'	Stadium: Meadowbank Stadium; Attendance: 226; Referee: Alastair Grieve

24 October 2026	Brora Rangers	3–1 (a.e.t.)	Cowdenbeath	Brora
15:00	MacKay 90'; Wallace 100'; Bunce 119' (pen.)		Mwangi 86'	Stadium: Dudgeon Park; Referee: Olivia Nicolson

24 October 2026	Brechin City	2–2 (a.e.t.) (6–5 p)	Strathspey Thistle	Brechin
15:00	Main 8' (pen.); Kirk 64'		Spark 2' (o.g.); Race 31'	Stadium: Glebe Park; Referee: Regan Wallace
	Penalties
	Main (penalty scored); Young (penalty scored); Watson (penalty missed); MacLeod (penalty scored); Taylor (penalty scored); Bell (penalty scored); Chisholm (penalty scored)		(penalty missed) Shewan; Thompson (penalty scored); (penalty scored) MacLeod; (penalty scored) McShane; (penalty scored) McRitchie; (penalty scored) Fraser; (penalty missed) Morrison

24 October 2026	Lochee United	1–2	The Spartans	Dundee
15:00	Allan 39'		McNulty 7', 44' (pen.)	Stadium: Thomson Park; Attendance: 196; Referee: Jamie Wilkie

24 October 2026	Troon	4–3 (a.e.t.)	Caledonian Braves	Troon
15:00	Viviani 19'; Allan 55'; Syme 90'; Bronsky 95'		McNeil 24', 49'; Thompson 40'	Stadium: Portland Park; Referee: Thomas Denholm

24 October 2026	Bo'ness United	2–1	Forfar Athletic	Bo'ness
15:00	Mitchell 64' (pen.); Allan 82'		Arnott 17'	Stadium: Newtown Park; Referee: Abbie Hendry

24 October 2026	Gretna 2008	0–3	Cumnock Juniors	Gretna
15:00			Craig 3'; Edgar 12'; Smith 53'	Stadium: Raydale Park; Referee: Calum Foreman

24 October 2026	Dunipace	1–5	Largs Thistle	Denny
15:00	Williamson 57'		N.Little 25', 31', 64'; Sewell 87' (pen.), 90'	Stadium: Westfield Park; Referee: Stuart Broadfoot

24 October 2026	Huntly	2–2 (a.e.t.) (1–4 p)	Annan Athletic	Huntly
15:00	Grant 48'; Morris 59'		A.Smith 20'; Roy 81'	Stadium: Christie Park; Attendance: 218; Referee: Daniel Graves
	Penalties
	McKenzie (penalty missed); Youngson (penalty missed); Robertson (penalty scored)		(penalty scored) A.Smith; (penalty scored) Maxwell; (penalty scored) Watson; (penalty scored) Roy

24 October 2026	University of Stirling	1–2	Elgin City	Stirling
15:00	Regan 80'		Hester 17'; Colloty 72'	Stadium: Forthbank Stadium; Referee: Joel Kennedy

24 October 2026	Renfrew	2–1	Stirling Albion	Renfrew
15:00	Gilfedder 43'; Sean Fyfe 55'		Hutchinson 79'	Stadium: New Western Park; Attendance: 293; Referee: Graham Grainger

24 October 2026	Bonnyton Thistle	0–3	Clachnacuddin	Kilmarnock
15:00			Cooper 12'; MacRae 62', 64'	Stadium: The Synergy Arena; Referee: Conor Greenan

24 October 2026	Stranraer	3–1	Tayport	Stranraer
15:00	Dobbie 48'; Nair 80'; Foster 90'		Reid 2'	Stadium: Stair Park; Attendance: 253; Referee: Josh Hay

24 October 2026	Clydebank	2–1	Tranent	Clydebank
15:00	McLaughlin 8'; Cairns 58'		Greig 72'	Stadium: Holm Park; Referee: Lewis Barnie

27 October 2026	Penicuik Athletic	1–1 (a.e.t.) (3–4 p)	Clyde	Penicuik
19:45	Healy 74'		Hilton 42'	Stadium: Montgomery Park; Attendance: 1,322; Referee: Gary Hanvidge
	Penalties
	Patterson (penalty scored); McGinley (penalty scored); Stewart (penalty missed); Healy (penalty scored); Johnstone (penalty missed)		(penalty scored) Hynes; (penalty scored) Fleming; (penalty scored) Cuddihy; (penalty missed) Connell; (penalty scored) Williamson

31 October 2026	Cumbernauld Colts	3–1	Banks o' Dee	Cumbernauld
15:00	Osemeke 42', 81'; Fernie 53'		McGrath 12'	Stadium: Broadwood Stadium; Attendance: 102; Referee: Nathan Crawford

31 October 2026	Hill of Beath Hawthorn	1–3	Musselburgh Athletic	Hill of Beath
15:00	Featherstone 49'		Walsh 3'; Buchanan 7'; Barker 80'	Stadium: Keir's Park; Referee: Ross Donaldson

31 October 2026	Johnstone Burgh	1–0	Formartine United	Johnstone
15:00	McKay 83'			Stadium: James Y. Keanie Park; Referee: Jamie McCunnie

31 October 2026	Threave Rovers	6–1	Pollok	Castle Douglas
15:00	Downie 3', 75' (pen.); Officer 45'; Irving 47'; Goss 80', 84'		McHugh 88'	Stadium: Meadow Park; Attendance: 463; Referee: Kieran O'Reilly

== Third round ==
The third round will consist of the 20 winners from the second round with the ten clubs from Scottish League One and the ten clubs from the Scottish Championship entering the competition. The matches will be played on 28 November 2026. The draw for the round took place on 25 October 2026 at 18:00 live on the Scottish Cup YouTube channel.

Teams in italics were unknown at the time of the draw.

Championship	League One	League Two	Highland League	Lowland League East	Lowland League West	West of Scotland League
Arbroath; Ayr United; Dunfermline Athletic; Greenock Morton; Inverness Caledonian Thistle; Livingston; Partick Thistle; Queen's Park; Raith Rovers; Stenhousemuir	Airdrieonians; Alloa Athletic; Cove Rangers; East Fife; East Kilbride; Hamilton Academical; Montrose; Peterhead; Queen of the South; Ross County	Annan Athletic; Clyde; Dumbarton; Edinburgh City; Elgin City; Stranraer; The Spartans	Brora Rangers; Clachnacuddin	Bo'ness United; Brechin City; Musselburgh Athletic	Clydebank; Cumbernauld Colts; Cumnock Juniors; Johnstone Burgh; Largs Thistle; Renfrew; Troon	First Division: Threave Rovers

=== Matches ===
27 November 2026	Largs Thistle	v	Ayr United	Largs
19:30				Stadium: Barrfields Park

28 November 2026	Troon	v	Raith Rovers	Troon
15:00				Stadium: Portland Park

28 November 2026	Montrose	v	Hamilton Academical	Montrose
15:00				Stadium: Links Park

28 November 2026	Queen of the South	v	Dunfermline Athletic	Dumfries
15:00				Stadium: Palmerston Park

28 November 2026	East Kilbride	v	Clyde	East Kilbride
15:00				Stadium: K-Park Training Academy

28 November 2026	Bo'ness United	v	Brechin City	Bo'ness
15:00				Stadium: Newtown Park

28 November 2026	Annan Athletic	v	Greenock Morton	Annan
15:00				Stadium: Galabank

28 November 2026	Cumnock Juniors	v	Arbroath	Cumnock
15:00				Stadium: Townhead Park

28 November 2026	Elgin City	v	Partick Thistle	Elgin
15:00				Stadium: Borough Briggs

28 November 2026	Dumbarton	v	Johnstone Burgh	Dumbarton
15:00				Stadium: The Rock

28 November 2026	Stranraer	v	Clachnacuddin	Stranraer
15:00				Stadium: Stair Park

28 November 2026	Peterhead	v	Edinburgh City	Peterhead
15:00				Stadium: Balmoor Stadium

28 November 2026	Threave Rovers	v	Alloa Athletic	Castle Douglas
15:00				Stadium: Meadow Park

28 November 2026	Queen's Park	v	The Spartans	Glasgow
15:00				Stadium: Lesser Hampden

28 November 2026	Ross County	v	Brora Rangers	Dingwall
15:00				Stadium: Victoria Park

28 November 2026	Musselburgh Athletic	v	Airdrieonians	Musselburgh
15:00				Stadium: Olivebank Arena

28 November 2026	Clydebank	v	Livingston	Clydebank
15:00				Stadium: Holm Park

28 November 2026	Renfrew	v	Cumbernauld Colts	Renfrew
15:00				Stadium: New Western Park

28 November 2026	Inverness Caledonian Thistle	v	Cove Rangers	Inverness
15:00				Stadium: Caledonian Stadium

28 November 2026	Stenhousemuir	v	East Fife	Stenhousemuir
15:00				Stadium: Ochilview Park

== Fourth round ==
The fourth round will consist of the 20 winners from the third round with the 12 clubs from the Scottish Premiership entering the competition. The matches will be played on 16 January 2027.

Premiership
- Aberdeen
- Celtic
- Dundee
- Dundee United
- Falkirk
- Heart of Midlothian
- Hibernian
- Kilmarnock
- Motherwell
- Rangers
- St Johnstone
- St Mirren

== Fifth round ==
The fifth round will take place on 6 February 2027 with the 16 winners of the fourth round.

== Quarter-finals ==
The quarterfinals will take place on 6 March 2027 with the eight winners of the fifth round.

== Semi-finals ==
The two semi-final ties will take place on 17 and 18 April 2027.

== Final ==
The final will take place on 22 May 2027 at Hampden Park in Glasgow.

== Broadcasting ==
The Scottish Cup is broadcast by Premier Sports and BBC Scotland. Premier Sports has the first two picks and the fifth pick of the fourth and fifth rounds, 2 quarter-finals as well as first pick of one semi-final and airs the final non-exclusively. BBC Scotland broadcasts one match per round from the first round onwards and two matches per round from the fourth round to the quarter-finals, as well as one semi-final and the final.

The following matches were selected for live coverage on UK television:

Round	BBC Scotland	Premier Sports
First round	Cumnock Juniors v Auchinleck Talbot (streamed)	
Second round		
Third round	Largs Thistle v Ayr United	
Fourth round		
Fifth round		
Quarter-finals		
Semi-finals		
Final		
