= 2016–17 South of Scotland Football League =

South of Scotland Football League
- Season: 2016–17
- Champions: Edusport Academy
- Promoted: Edusport Academy
- Matches: 182
- Goals: 889 (4.88 per match)

The 2016–17 South of Scotland Football League, was the 71st season of the South of Scotland Football League, and the 3rd season as the sixth tier of the Scottish football pyramid system. St Cuthbert Wanderers were the defending champions.

Edusport Academy won the league and became the first team to be promoted to the Lowland League, as East of Scotland League winners Lothian Thistle Hutchison Vale did not meet the required licensing criteria for promotion and therefore no play-off took place.

== Teams ==
Lochmaben merged with Crichton.

Location of teams in 2016–17 South of Scotland Football League within Dumfries & Galloway

Team	Location	Home ground	Capacity	Ref.
Abbey Vale	New Abbey	Maryfield Park	1,000	
Creetown	Creetown	Castle Cary Park	2,000	
Dumfries YMCA	Dumfries	Kingholm Park	1,000	
Edusport Academy	Annan	Galabank	3,000	
Heston Rovers	Dumfries	Palmerston Park	7,620	
Lochmaben	Lockerbie	New King Edward Park	1,000	
Lochar Thistle	Dumfries	Maxwelltown High School	1,000	
Mid-Annandale	Lockerbie	New King Edward Park	1,000	
Newton Stewart	Newton Stewart	Blairmount Park	1,500	
Nithsdale Wanderers	Sanquhar	Lorimer Park	1,000	
St Cuthbert Wanderers	Kirkcudbright	St Mary's Park	2,000	
Threave Rovers	Castle Douglas	Meadow Park	1,500	
Upper Annandale	Moffat	Moffat Academy	1,000	
Wigtown & Bladnoch	Wigtown	Trammondford Park	1,500	

== League table ==
Pos	Team	Pld	W	D	L	GF	GA	GD	Pts	Promotion or qualification
1	Edusport Academy (C, P)	26	22	2	2	88	28	+60	68	Promotion to the Lowland League
2	Wigtown & Bladnoch	26	21	3	2	74	29	+45	66	
3	St Cuthbert Wanderers	26	19	3	4	110	54	+56	60	
4	Threave Rovers	26	11	7	8	62	32	+30	40	
5	Mid-Annandale	26	12	4	10	79	72	+7	40	
6	Newton Stewart	26	12	3	11	70	59	+11	39	
7	Heston Rovers	26	12	2	12	68	61	+7	38	
8	Abbey Vale	26	11	5	10	61	54	+7	38	
9	Lochar Thistle	26	11	2	13	62	52	+10	35	
10	Creetown	26	10	1	15	49	67	−18	31	
11	Lochmaben	26	8	2	16	46	65	−19	26	
12	Upper Annandale	26	5	6	15	45	69	−24	21	
13	Nithsdale Wanderers	26	6	3	17	53	84	−31	21	
14	Dumfries YMCA	26	0	1	25	22	163	−141	1	

Source: South of Scotland Football League
Rules for classification: 1) Points; 2) Goal difference; 3) Number of goals scored
(C) Champions; (P) Promoted
