= 2017–18 South of Scotland Football League =

South of Scotland Football League
- Season: 2017–18
- Dates: 29 July 2017 – 7 May 2018
- Champions: Threave Rovers
- Matches: 210
- Goals: 1,077 (5.13 per match)
- Biggest home win: Threave Rovers 8–0 Dumfries YMCA (2 August 2017); Bonnyton Thistle 8–0 Dumfries YMCA (18 November 2017); Stranraer reserves 8–0 Annan Athletic reserves (9 December 2017); Newton Stewart 9–1 Dumfries YMCA (25 January 2018); St Cuthbert Wanderers 10–2 Annan Athletic reserves (17 February 2018); Bonnyton Thistle 9–1 Creetown (24 March 2018); Lochar Thistle 8–0 Annan Athletic reserves (7 April 2018)
- Biggest away win: Dumfries YMCA 0–10 Bonnyton Thistle (23 August 2017)
- Highest scoring: St Cuthbert Wanderers 10–2 Annan Athletic reserves (17 February 2018)
- Longest winning run: 11 matches: Threave Rovers
- Longest unbeaten run: 17 matches: Threave Rovers
- Longest winless run: 19 matches: Dumfries YMCA
- Longest losing run: 19 matches: Dumfries YMCA
- All statistics correct as of 7 May 2018.

The 2017–18 South of Scotland Football League was the 72nd season of the South of Scotland Football League, and the 4th season as the sixth tier of the Scottish football pyramid system. The season began on 29 July 2017 and ended on 7 May 2018. Reigning champions Edusport Academy were promoted to the Lowland League so did not defend their title.

The league was initially increased to a 16 team division as Bonnyton Thistle joined, and the reserve teams of Annan Athletic and Stranraer returned. However, Wigtown & Bladnoch pulled out before the season started, reducing the division to fifteen teams.

Threave Rovers won the league with a 2–0 win over closest rivals Mid-Annandale on 23 April 2018. They faced 2017–18 East of Scotland Football League champions Kelty Hearts for a place in the 2018–19 Lowland Football League, but lost 10–0 on aggregate.

== Teams ==
Location of teams in 2017–18 South of Scotland Football League within Dumfries & Galloway

The following teams have changed since the 2016–17 season.

=== To South of Scotland League ===
- Annan Athletic reserves
- Bonnyton Thistle
- Stranraer reserves

=== From South of Scotland League ===
Promoted to Lowland Football League

- Edusport Academy

Team	Location	Home ground	Capacity	Seats	Floodlit
Abbey Vale	New Abbey	Maryfield Park	1,000	0	No
Annan Athletic reserves	Annan	Galabank	2,504	500	Yes
Bonnyton Thistle	Kilmarnock	Bonnyton Park	1,000	100	Yes
Creetown	Creetown	Castlecary Park	1,000	0	No
Dumfries YMCA	Dumfries	Kingholm Park	500	0	Yes
Heston Rovers	Dumfries	Palmerston Park	8,690	3,377	Yes
Lochar Thistle	Dumfries	Maxwelltown High School	1,000	0	No
Lochmaben	Lockerbie	New King Edward Park	1,000	0	No
Mid-Annandale	Lockerbie	New King Edward Park	1,000	0	No
Newton Stewart ^{[SFA]}	Newton Stewart	Blairmount Park	1,500	0	Yes
Nithsdale Wanderers	Sanquhar	Lorimer Park	1,000	0	Yes
St Cuthbert Wanderers ^{[SFA]}	Kirkcudbright	St Mary's Park	2,000	0	Yes
Stranraer reserves	Stranraer	Stair Park	4,178	1,830	Yes
Threave Rovers ^{[SFA]}	Castle Douglas	Meadow Park	1,500		Yes
Upper Annandale	Moffat	Moffat Academy	1,000	0	No

^{SFA} Club has an SFA Licence (as of 20 December 2017) and are eligible to participate in the Lowland League promotion play-off should they win the league.

== League table ==
Pos	Team	Pld	W	D	L	GF	GA	GD	Pts	Qualification
1	Threave Rovers (C)	28	24	1	3	94	21	+73	73	Qualification for Lowland League play-off
2	Mid-Annandale	28	21	3	4	107	42	+65	66	
3	Lochar Thistle	28	20	3	5	89	40	+49	63	
4	St Cuthbert Wanderers	28	17	3	8	87	57	+30	54	
5	Abbey Vale	28	15	4	9	78	50	+28	49	
6	Bonnyton Thistle	28	14	4	10	89	41	+48	46	
7	Heston Rovers	28	15	1	12	75	71	+4	46	
8	Stranraer reserves	28	12	6	10	90	77	+13	42	
9	Newton Stewart	28	12	2	14	65	64	+1	38	
10	Upper Annandale	28	11	4	13	66	74	−8	37	
11	Nithsdale Wanderers	28	11	3	14	77	81	−4	36	
12	Lochmaben	28	10	3	15	61	75	−14	33	
13	Annan Athletic reserves	28	3	1	24	41	139	−98	10	
14	Creetown	28	3	2	23	32	97	−65	11	
15	Dumfries YMCA	28	2	0	26	26	148	−122	6	
16	Wigtown & Bladnoch	0	0	0	0	0	0	0	0	Withdrawn

Source: South of Scotland Football League
Rules for classification: 1) Points; 2) Goal difference; 3) Number of goals scored
(C) Champions
