= Vale of Leithen F.C. =

Association football club in Scotland

Vale of Leithen
- Full name: Vale of Leithen Football Club
- Nickname: The Vale
- Founded: 1891
- Ground: Victoria Park, Innerleithen
- Capacity: 1,500
- Coordinates: 55°37′13″N 3°3′52″W
- Chairman: Stuart Robertson
- Coach: Ger Rossi
- League: East of Scotland League Third Division
- 2025–26: East of Scotland League Second Division, 8th of 11
- Website: http://valeofleithen.co.uk/
Home colours

Vale of Leithen Football Club are a football club based in the town of Innerleithen, thirty miles south of Edinburgh, capital city of Scotland.

Currently the club are members of the East of Scotland Football League and play their football in the recently formed Second Division Conference South East, with home games taking place at Victoria Park.

The team's motto is "Keep Faith", and features on their club crest, along with the town's patron saint, St. Ronan.

The home strip features a navy blue shirt, shorts and socks with white trim; the away strip is a yellow shirt, with blue trim.

Vale of Leithen should not be confused with the slightly differently named West of Scotland team Vale of Leven.

== Brief History ==
The club are one of the oldest in the Scottish Borders, having been formed in May 1891, they became full members of the Scottish Football Association in 1897.

The team began playing at Caddon Park under the name of Leithen Vale but after two games subsequently changed to Vale of Leithen Football Club.

The club played their first match in October 1891 against, Gala Harp and recorded a 2–1 victory.

The club’s first honour came in 1898-99 when winning the Border Cup, a competition the team would win on twelve occasions with the last being in the 1953–54 season.

In February 1920, Vale of Leithen took part in the, Scottish FA Cup proper for the first time, travelling to, Hampden Park to play Queen’s Park FC a game that ended in a 3–0 defeat.

In 1922, they moved to their current home, Victoria Park, which has a ground capacity of around 1,500 standing spectators with one covered stand.

The highest recorded attendance being 3,700 in January 1962 for a Second Round Scottish FA Cup tie against Heart of Midlothian.

The 1924–25 season saw Vale of Leithen win the, East of Scotland Football League for the first time, finishing two points ahead of runners-up, Civil Service Strollers, losing only one game in the process.

In August 1974, the ground’s pavilion and changing rooms were completely destroyed by fire causing the loss of the clubs playing equipment and all their historical records over many seasons.

In October 1976 Vale of Leithen beat, Eyemouth United FC 16–0 at Victoria Park in an East of Scotland Football League fixture, the biggest recorded victory in the club’s history.

Vale of Leithen won the East of Scotland Football League for the second time under the management of Finlay Watson in 1977–78, finishing two points ahead of, Spartans FC.

Also during the 1977–78 season Vale of Leithen recorded their best result in the Scottish FA Cup when defeating League Division Two side Forfar Athletic 4–1 in a Second Round Tie played at Victoria Park.

The 1978–79 season has to date been the club’s most successful with Vale of Leithen declared champions of the East of Scotland Football League ahead of Selkirk FC on goal difference, both sides finished the campaign with forty-two points, winning the East of Scotland Qualifying Cup beating Civil Service Strollers 2–1 in a final played at Tynecastle Park and contesting the final of the Scottish Qualifying Cup but losing 3–2 on aggregate to Gala Fairydean.

Former, Hibernian FC player, Mervyn Jones, assisted by John Smith, saw the club win the East of Scotland Football League for a fourth time in the 1986–87 season finishing four points ahead of, Kelso United, scoring 114 goals in the process.

The team have reached the Third Round of the Scottish FA Cup on five occasions with the most recent during the 2012–13 season when losing to Cowdenbeath FC at Central Park.

The club were founding members of the Lowland Football League in the 2013–14 season.

Their best finishing position was 6th place in their first campaign, spending nine seasons in the league before being relegated back to the East of Scotland Football League at the end of the 2021–22 season, with further relegations in the subsequent three seasons.

In September 2025 the club announced the appointment of former player and club captain Ger Rossi as Head Coach at Victoria Park.

Vale of Leithen announced in May 2026 former St Johnstone and Scotland international player Murray Davidson had joined the club in a role focused on supporting young player development.

The 2026-27 season will see a regional restructure of the Lowland Football League which results in a split creating an East and West League. These changes led to an increase in promotions throughout the Four East of Scotland Football League Division's at the conclusion of the 2025-26 season, leaving only seven teams remaining in Division Three.

As a consequence, the East of Scotland Football League made the decision to amalgamate Division's Two and Three which in turn created two Conference Leagues, Second Division North West and Second Division South East with Vale of Leithen being placed in the Second Division Conference South East ahead of the 2026-27 season.

== Club Officials ==
Position	Name
Honorary President	Keith Brown
Honorary Vice President	Stanley Clifford
Chairman	Stuart Robertson
Vice Chairman	Michael Hogarth
General Manager	Bobby Craigie
Secretary - Club Chaplain	Rob Wilson
Treasurer	Jim Rainey

== Coaching Staff ==
As of October 2026

Position	Name
First Team Head Coach	Ger Rossi
First Team Assistant Head Coach	Scott Brown
First Team Coach	Tam McFayden
First Team Coach	Alan MacDonald
Under 20’s Coach	Martin Simpson
Under 20’s Coach	Euan Newall
Physiotherapist	John Masson

== Current Squad ==
As of November 2026

Note: Flags indicate national team as defined under FIFA eligibility rules; some limited exceptions apply. Players may hold more than one non-FIFA nationality.

No.	Pos.	Nation	Player
—	GK	SCO	Jonti Rodger-Whiteford
—	DF	SCO	Finlay Anderson
—	DF	SCO	Ben Brown
—	DF	SCO	Nathan Masson
—	DF	SCO	Gerry McBride
—	DF	SCO	Nathan McDonald
—	DF	SCO	Callum Mitchell
—	MF	SCO	Lewis Chisholm
—	MF	SCO	Murray Davidson
—	MF	SCO	Paul Dickson

No.	Pos.	Nation	Player
—	MF	SCO	Jack Furness
—	MF	SCO	Scott Latto
—	MF	SCO	Harry McGill
—	MF	SCO	Ross Nicholson
—	MF	SCO	Fraser Stewart
—	MF	SCO	Willie White
—	FW	SCO	Jake Houten
—	FW	SCO	Kyle Kivlichan
—	FW	SCO	Kyle Mitchell
—	FW	SCO	Lewis Moffat

== Season-by-Season ==
Season	League	Division	Position	Played	Wins	Draws	Losses	GD	Points	Scottish Cup	
2000/01	East of Scotland Football League	Premier Division	8th	22	7	3	12	-8	24	Did not Compete	
2001/02	East of Scotland Football League	Premier Division	5th	22	9	6	7	-1	33	Did not Compete	
2002/03	East of Scotland Football League	Premier Division	10th	22	5	4	13	−19	19	Did not Compete	
2003/04	East of Scotland Football League	Premier Division	11th	22	4	7	11	−21	19	Second Round, losing to Greenock Morton	
2004/05	East of Scotland Football League	First Division	5th	22	11	5	6	+21	38	Did not Compete	
2005/06	East of Scotland Football League	First Division	4th	20	7	8	5	+6	29	Did not Compete	
2006/07	East of Scotland Football Leaguen	First Division	3rd	20	10	4	6	+36	34	Did not Compete	
2007/08	East of Scotland Football League	First Division	6th	22	10	4	8	+5	34	Second Round, losing to Culter	
2008/09	East of Scotland Football League	First Division	7th	22	9	4	9	+4	31	Third Round, losing to Inverurie Loco Works	
2009/10	East of Scotland Football League	First Division	2nd	22	19	2	1	+45	59	Second Round, losing to Keith	
2010/11	East of Scotland Football League	Premier Division	7th	22	7	9	6	+1	30	First Round, losing to Keith	
2011/12	East of Scotland Football League	Premier Division	8th	22	9	1	12	+2	28	Third Round, losing to Auchinleck Talbot	
2012/13	East of Scotland Football League	Premier Division	9th	22	5	8	9	−8	23	Third Round, losing to Cowdenbeath	
2013/14	Lowland Football League		6th	22	11	3	8	−2	36	First Round, losing to Brora Rangers	
2014/15	Lowland Football League		9th	26	9	6	11	−14	33	Preliminary Round, losing to Gala Fairydean Rovers	
2015/16	Lowland Football League		13th	28	7	5	16	−29	26	Preliminary Round One, losing to Wigtown & Bladnoch	
2016/17	Lowland Football League		13th	30	11	4	15	−14	37	First Round, losing to East Kilbride	
2017/18	Lowland Football League		15th	30	8	5	17	−32	29	First Round, losing to The Spartans	
2018/19	Lowland Football League		13th	28	8	5	15	−31	29	First Round, losing to Gretna 2008	
2019/20	Lowland Football League		16th	23	2	2	19	−71	8	First Round, losing to Fort William	†
2020/21	Lowland Football League		17th	12	0	0	12	−53	0	Preliminary Round Two, losing to Banks O' Dee	†
2021/22	Lowland Football League		18th	34	1	2	31	−156	5	First Round, losing to Brechin City	
2022/23	East of Scotland Football League	Premier Division	16th	30	2	0	28	−115	-6	Preliminary Round, losing to Dunbar United	††
2023/24	East of Scotland Football League	First Division	15th	28	0	0	28	-109	-3	Preliminary Round Two, losing to Dunbar United	†††
2024/25	East of Scotland Football League	Second Division	14th	28	9	1	18	-25	28	First Round, losing to Threave Rovers	
2025/26	East of Scotland Football League	Third Division	8th	30	12	6	12	+9	42	Preliminary Round Two, losing to Musselburgh Athletic	
2026/27	East of Scotland Football League	Second Division Conference South-East								Preliminary Round Two, losing to Drumchapel United	

† Season curtailed due to coronavirus pandemic.

†† Vale of Leithen FC were given four three-point deductions.

††† Vale of Leithen FC were deducted three points.

== Notable Former Players ==
John Collins - Former Celtic FC, Monaco FC, Everton FC and Scottish International midfielder, although never a Vale of Leithen player, he trained with the club during his youth.

Garry O'Connor - Former Hibernian FC and Scotland forward was briefly registered as a Vale of Leithen player in 2015 after finishing his professional career.

Jock Robson - Former Arsenal FC goalkeeper who made 97 appearances during his time at the Highbury Stadium in spite of being the clubs smallest ever goalkeeper at 5’8’, also played for Bournemouth & Boscombe Athletic.

Darren Smith - Former Motherwell FC midfielder played at Vale of Leithen during the latter stages of his career.

== Club Honours ==
East of Scotland Football League

- Winners (4) : 1924–25, 1977–78, 1978–79, 1986–87

East of Scotland Qualifying Cup

- Winners (7) : 1919–20, 1920–21, 1924–25, 1948–49, 1978–79, 1981–82, 1985–86

Scottish Qualifying Cup (South)

- Winners (5) : 1957–58, 1972–73, 1976–77, 1990–91, 1992–93

East of Scotland (City Cup)

- Winners (1) : 1991–92

King Cup

- Winners (7) : 1921–22, 1936–37, 1955–56, 1959–60, 1985–86, 1986–87, 1991–92

East of Scotland Consolation Cup

- Winners (2) : 1911–12, 1922–23

Border Senior League

- Winners (3) : 1903–04, 1907–07,1910-11

Border Senior League (Paul Shield)

- Winners (1) : 1921–22

Border Cup

- Winners (11) : 1898–99,1999-00,1901-02,1902-03, 1909–10, 1912–13, 1920–21, 1925–26, 1932–33,1933-24,1953-54

Border Junior League

- Winners (1) : 1908–09

Centenary Cup

- Winners (1) : 2026-27

== Club Records ==
Best League Performance: Scottish Lowland Football League

- 6th position, 2013–14

Best Scottish FA Cup Performance

- Third Round, 1956–57, 1977–78, 2008–09, 2011–12, 2012–13

Record Attendance

- 3,700 vs Heart of Midlothian, Scottish FA Cup Second Round, January 1962

Record Goalscorer

- George Hogarth
