= 2017–18 Lowland Football League =

Lowland League
- Season: 2017–18
- Dates: 28 July 2017 – 8 May 2018
- Champions: The Spartans
- Relegated: Hawick Royal Albert
- Matches: 240
- Goals: 813 (3.39 per match)
- Top goalscorer: Jack Smith (BSC Glasgow) (21 goals)
- Biggest home win: The Spartans 7–0 Hawick Royal Albert (29 July 2017); Cumbernauld Colts 7–0 Hawick Royal Albert (9 December 2017)
- Biggest away win: Hawick Royal Albert 0–10 Selkirk (2 August 2017)
- Highest scoring: Hawick Royal Albert 0–10 Selkirk (2 August 2017)
- Longest winning run: 10 matches: East Kilbride
- Longest unbeaten run: 19 matches: East Stirlingshire
- Longest winless run: 18 matches: Hawick Royal Albert
- Longest losing run: 15 matches: Hawick Royal Albert
- All statistics correct as of 9 May 2018.

The 2017–18 Scottish Lowland Football League (known as the Ferrari Packaging Lowland League for sponsorship reasons) was the fifth season of the Lowland Football League, the fifth tier of the Scottish football pyramid system. The season began on 28 July 2017 and ended on 8 May 2018. East Kilbride were the defending champions.

Edusport Academy became the first club to gain promotion from the South of Scotland League, replacing Preston Athletic who were relegated to the East of Scotland League.

The Spartans won the league on 14 April 2018, after a goalless draw with East Stirlingshire at Ainslie Park in their final match. They faced the winners of the 2017–18 Highland Football League (Cove Rangers) in the semi-finals of the League Two Play-offs, losing 5–2 on aggregate.

== Teams ==
Location of teams in 2017–18 Scottish Lowland Football League

The following teams have changed division since the 2016–17 season.

=== To Lowland League ===
Promoted from South of Scotland League

- Edusport Academy

=== From Lowland League ===
Relegated to East of Scotland League

- Preston Athletic

=== Stadia and Locations ===
Team	Location	Stadium	Capacity	Seats	Floodlit
BSC Glasgow	Alloa	Recreation Park	3,100	919	Yes
Civil Service Strollers	Edinburgh	Christie Gillies Park	1,569	100	No
Cumbernauld Colts	Cumbernauld	Broadwood Stadium	7,936	7,936	Yes
Dalbeattie Star	Dalbeattie	Islecroft Stadium	4,000	250	Yes
East Kilbride	East Kilbride	K Park	660	400	Yes
East Stirlingshire	Stenhousemuir	Ochilview Park	3,746	626	Yes
Edinburgh University	Edinburgh	New Peffermill Stadium	1,100	100	Yes
Edusport Academy	Annan	Galabank	2,504	500	Yes
Gala Fairydean Rovers	Galashiels	3G Arena, Netherdale	5,500	495	Yes
Gretna 2008	Gretna	Raydale Park	3,000	1,318	Yes
Hawick Royal Albert	Hawick	Albert Park	1,000	500	Yes
Selkirk	Selkirk	Yarrow Park	1,000	100	No
The Spartans	Edinburgh	Ainslie Park	3,000	504	Yes
Stirling University	Falkirk	Falkirk Stadium	7,937	7,937	Yes
Vale of Leithen	Innerleithen	Victoria Park	1,500	0	No
Whitehill Welfare	Rosewell	Ferguson Park	4,000	150	No

== League table ==
Pos	Team	Pld	W	D	L	GF	GA	GD	Pts	Promotion, qualification or relegation
1	The Spartans (C)	30	23	4	3	64	17	+47	73	Qualification for the League Two play-off semi-finals
2	East Kilbride	30	22	5	3	76	23	+53	71	
3	BSC Glasgow	30	20	5	5	71	27	+44	65	
4	East Stirlingshire	30	19	7	4	67	31	+36	64	
5	Selkirk	30	15	3	12	63	50	+13	48	
6	Cumbernauld Colts	30	11	8	11	53	54	−1	41	
7	Civil Service Strollers	30	11	7	12	47	44	+3	40	
8	Gretna 2008	30	12	4	14	50	56	−6	40	
9	Stirling University	30	11	5	14	45	49	−4	38	
10	Edusport Academy	30	9	7	14	46	49	−3	34	
11	Edinburgh University	30	9	7	14	40	45	−5	34	
12	Whitehill Welfare	30	11	1	18	50	66	−16	34	
13	Gala Fairydean Rovers	30	8	7	15	43	63	−20	31	
14	Dalbeattie Star	30	7	8	15	46	65	−19	29	
15	Vale of Leithen	30	8	5	17	44	76	−32	29	
16	Hawick Royal Albert (R)	30	1	3	26	18	108	−90	6	Relegation to the East of Scotland League

Source: SLFL Soccerway
Rules for classification: 1) Points; 2) Goal difference; 3) Number of goals scored
(C) Champions; (R) Relegated

== Results ==
Home \ Away	BSC	CSS	CUM	DBS	EKB	EST	EDU	EDA	GFR	G08	HRA	SEL	SPA	SLU	VOL	WHW
BSC Glasgow		2–1	1–4	4–0	0–1	0–1	4–1	1–0	4–1	1–3	5–0	1–0	0–0	2–0	2–0	4–0
Civil Service Strollers	4–2		1–1	4–1	0–3	1–3	3–1	1–2	2–2	1–0	2–0	2–3	1–2	2–4	4–0	0–2
Cumbernauld Colts	2–2	1–1		2–0	0–4	1–3	2–1	1–2	2–2	5–2	7–0	1–0	1–1	2–1	6–1	2–1
Dalbeattie Star	2–4	2–3	1–1		0–2	3–3	2–0	1–0	0–2	1–1	3–0	4–1	0–4	1–2	2–4	1–0
East Kilbride	1–1	3–0	3–0	1–0		0–5	0–1	2–1	3–0	4–0	6–0	4–1	1–0	1–1	6–0	4–1
East Stirlingshire	0–3	2–2	3–0	4–1	1–1		0–1	2–1	0–0	0–1	1–1	4–2	2–2	4–2	2–1	3–1
Edinburgh University	0–0	0–0	1–2	2–2	1–1	1–2		5–3	1–0	5–1	2–0	1–2	1–2	0–1	1–1	2–1
Edusport Academy	0–1	0–1	2–1	1–1	3–3	1–3	2–2		4–4	1–5	4–0	0–2	1–2	0–0	3–1	2–0
Gala Fairydean Rovers	0–4	0–0	4–3	2–2	1–2	0–1	2–3	2–1		5–2	1–0	1–2	0–1	1–1	1–3	2–5
Gretna 2008	2–2	0–2	1–1	3–2	1–4	1–4	1–0	0–3	1–2		1–0	1–3	0–3	0–1	3–0	4–1
Hawick Royal Albert	0–9	0–5	0–1	3–3	2–3	1–4	2–2	2–3	0–2	1–2		0–10	0–2	1–4	1–4	1–4
Selkirk	1–2	1–1	1–0	2–2	1–4	0–3	4–3	0–3	4–0	0–2	5–0		0–2	4–3	1–1	5–1
The Spartans	2–1	1–0	5–0	3–2	0–2	0–0	1–0	2–1	2–0	1–0	7–0	2–1		1–0	5–0	2–0
Stirling University	1–2	3–1	2–0	2–4	2–0	3–1	2–0	0–0	1–3	0–4	1–2	0–2	1–3		2–1	1–1
Vale of Leithen	0–4	2–0	4–4	2–3	0–4	0–2	1–0	1–1	5–1	2–2	2–0	1–3	0–5	3–2		3–4
Whitehill Welfare	1–2	1–2	4–0	3–0	0–3	0–4	1–2	3–1	4–2	1–6	3–1	1–2	1–2	3–2	2–1	

Source: SLFL
Legend: Blue = home team win; Yellow = draw; Red = away team win.

== Lowland League play-off ==
A play-off took place between the winners of the 2017–18 East of Scotland Football League (Kelty Hearts) and the 2017–18 South of Scotland Football League (Threave Rovers) as both clubs met the required criteria for promotion. Kelty Hearts won 10–0 on aggregate to secure a place in the 2018–19 Lowland Football League.

=== First leg ===
5 May 2018	Threave Rovers	0–4	Kelty Hearts	Castle Douglas
14:30				Stadium: Meadow Park; Referee: Lloyd Wilson

=== Second leg ===
12 May 2018	Kelty Hearts	6–0 (10–0 agg.)	Threave Rovers	Kelty
14:30				Stadium: New Central Park; Referee: Chris Fordyce
