= 2023–24 South of Scotland Football League =

South of Scotland Football League
- Season: 2023–24
- Dates: 29 July 2023 – 8 May 2024
- Champions: Dalbeattie Star
- Matches: 132
- Goals: 639 (4.84 per match)
- Biggest home win: Dalbeattie Star 10–1 Wigtown & Bladnoch (9 December 2023); Stranraer reserves 9–0 Upper Annandale (23 March 2024)
- Biggest away win: St Cuthbert Wanderers 0–13 Newton Stewart (5 August 2023)
- Highest scoring: St Cuthbert Wanderers 0–13 Newton Stewart (5 August 2023)
- Longest winning run: 8 matches: Dalbeattie Star
- Longest unbeaten run: 15 matches: Dalbeattie Star
- Longest winless run: 21 matches: Wigtown & Bladnoch
- Longest losing run: 11 matches: Wigtown & Bladnoch
- All statistics correct as of 8 May 2024.

The 2023–24 South of Scotland Football League was the 78th season of the South of Scotland Football League, and the 10th season as part of the sixth tier of the Scottish football pyramid system. Abbey Vale were the reigning champions, but could only finish fourth in the table.

The championship title, and qualification for the Lowland League play-off, was decided in the final fixture of the season on 8 May with Creetown and Dalbeattie Star facing off against each other at Castle Cary Park – having been postponed on 20 April due to ground issues. A 1–1 draw saw Dalbeattie Star take the title by two points, and as a result, faced Broxburn Athletic in the play-off, losing 2–12 on aggregate.

== Teams ==
Location of teams in 2023–24 South of Scotland Football League

The following team changed divisions after the 2022–23 season.

=== To South of Scotland League ===
Relegated from Lowland Football League

- Dalbeattie Star

=== From South of Scotland League ===
Resigned

- Caledonian Braves reserves

=== Stadia and locations ===
Team	Location	Home ground	Surface	Capacity	Seats	Floodlit
Abbey Vale	New Abbey	Maryfield Park	Grass	500	48	No
Creetown^{[SFA]}	Creetown	Castle Cary Park	Grass	500	0	Yes
Dalbeattie Star^{[SFA]}	Dalbeattie	Islecroft Stadium	Grass	1,320	100	Yes
Lochar Thistle	Dumfries	Wilson Park	Grass	1,000	0	Yes
Lochmaben	Lochmaben	Whitehills Park	Grass	1,000	0	No
Mid-Annandale	Lockerbie	New King Edward Park	Artificial	500	0	Yes
Newton Stewart^{[SFA]}	Newton Stewart	Blairmount Park	Artificial	1,000	0	Yes
Nithsdale Wanderers	Sanquhar	Lorimer Park	Grass	1,000	0	Yes
St Cuthbert Wanderers^{[SFA]}	Kirkcudbright	St Mary's Park	Artificial	1,000	0	Yes
Stranraer reserves	Stranraer	Stranraer Academy	Artificial	1,000	0	Yes
Upper Annandale	Moffat	Moffat Academy	Grass	1,000	0	No
Wigtown & Bladnoch^{[SFA]}	Wigtown	Trammondford Park	Grass	888	0	Yes

^{SFA} Club with an SFA licence eligible to participate in the Lowland League promotion play-off should they win the league.

Stranraer reserves are ineligible for promotion.

== League table ==
Pos	Team	Pld	W	D	L	GF	GA	GD	Pts	Qualification
1	Dalbeattie Star (C)	22	17	3	2	92	22	+70	54	Qualification for the Lowland League play-off
2	Creetown	22	16	4	2	69	20	+49	52	
3	Newton Stewart	22	16	2	4	84	29	+55	50	
4	Abbey Vale	22	15	3	4	80	24	+56	48	
5	Lochar Thistle	22	12	6	4	62	31	+31	42	
6	Stranraer reserves	22	12	1	9	61	58	+3	37	Ineligible for promotion
7	Nithsdale Wanderers	22	11	3	8	55	44	+11	36	
8	Mid-Annandale	22	8	1	13	53	78	−25	25	
9	Upper Annandale	22	4	2	16	29	76	−47	14	
10	Lochmaben	22	2	4	16	22	78	−56	10	
11	St Cuthbert Wanderers	22	2	1	19	12	83	−71	7	
12	Wigtown & Bladnoch	22	1	2	19	20	96	−76	5	

Rules for classification: 1) Points; 2) Goal difference; 3) Number of goals scored
(C) Champions

== Results ==
Home \ Away	ABB	CRE	DAL	LOT	LOC	MID	NEW	NIT	SCW	STR	UPA	WIG
Abbey Vale		0–2	0–1	5–0	7–1	6–2 (Note: Match played at North West Community Campus, Dumfries.)	3–0	0–0	5–0	3–3	3–1 (Note: Match played at Dumfries High School, Dumfries.)	4–1
Creetown	3–2		1–1	0–0	3–0	6–0	3–3	1–1	4–1 (Note: Match played at Blairmount Park, Newton Stewart.)	1–2	7–0	8–0 (Note: Match played at Stranraer Academy 3G, Stranraer.)
Dalbeattie Star	2–3	3–0		2–2	6–1	3–1	3–0	3–0	3–0	7–0	6–0	10–1 (Note: Match played at North West Community Campus, Dumfries.)
Lochar Thistle	2–2 (Note: Match played at North West Community Campus.)	1–2	4–4		4–1 (Note: Match played at North West Community Campus.)	5–0	3–3 (Note: Match played at North West Community Campus.)	4–1	6–0	3–1	1–1	3–1
Lochmaben	1–3	1–6	0–4	0–4		1–2	1–3	0–3	1–1	3–2	3–3	1–1
Mid-Annandale	1–5	0–3	1–6	3–5	7–0		4–7	2–2	3–2	2–3	5–3	4–0
Newton Stewart	2–0	2–3	2–4	1–0	7–0	5–0		2–1	3–0	3–0	6–0	6–2
Nithsdale Wanderers	0–3	2–3	4–3	3–2	3–2	6–1	1–3		3–0	3–5	5–1	4–2
St Cuthbert Wanderers	1–11	1–2	0–6	0–3	2–3	1–3	0–13	0–3		0–3	0–2	1–0
Stranraer reserves	0–6	0–4	2–5	0–3	3–1	5–4	0–4	4–2	3–0		9–0	7–0
Upper Annandale	1–3	0–2 (Note: Match played at New King Edward Park, Lockerbie.)	0–3 (Note: Match played at New King Edward Park, Lockerbie.)	0–2	3–0	2–3 (Note: Match played at Raydale Park, Gretna.)	1–5	2–3 (Note: Match played at New King Edward Park, Lockerbie.)	2–0 (Note: Match played at New King Edward Park, Lockerbie.)	2–6		4–1 (Note: Match played at New King Edward Park, Lockerbie.)
Wigtown & Bladnoch	0–6	0–5 (Note: Match played at Blairmount Park, Newton Stewart.)	0–7	1–5	1–1	2–5	0–4	1–5	1–2	2–3	3–1	

Source: South of Scotland Football League
Legend: Blue = home team win; Yellow = draw; Red = away team win.
