= Ivison =

Ivison is a surname. Notable people with the surname include:

- Billy Ivison (1920–2000), English footballer and rugby league player
- John Ivison, Scottish-Canadian journalist and author
- Robbie Ivison (born 2000), English footballer

== See also ==
- Evison
