= Marcus Gill =

Scottish-Irish professional footballer

Personal information
- Full name: Marcus Gill
- Date of birth: 11 May 2007 (age 19)
- Position: Goalkeeper

Team information
- Current team: East Kilbride (on loan from Celtic)
- Number: 21

Youth career
- –2024: Celtic

Senior career*
Years	Team	Apps	(Gls)
2024–	Celtic B	26	(0)
2025	→ Inverness Caledonian Thistle (loan)	3	(0)
2026–	→ East Kilbride (loan)	3	(0)

International career^{‡}
2022	Scotland U16	1	(0)
2022–2023	Republic of Ireland U16	3	(0)
2023	Republic of Ireland U17	1	(0)
2024–2025	Republic of Ireland U19	9	(0)
- * Club domestic league appearances and goals as of 21:25, 13 November 2026 (UTC) ‡ National team caps and goals as of 13:42, 21 September 2026 (UTC)

Marcus Gill (born 11 May 2007) is a Scottish-born Irish professional footballer who currently plays for Scottish League One side, East Kilbride, on loan from Celtic.

== Club career ==
=== Celtic ===
Gill started his career coming through the Celtic Academy, before signing his first professional deal with the club in 2023, being placed into the clubs reserve side in the Lowland League.

==== Inverness Caledonian Thistle loan ====
In April 2025, Gill was sent on emergency loan to Scottish League One side, Inverness Caledonian Thistle, to cover for a goalkeeper shortage, playing the final three games of the season and keeping a clean sheet in wins over Arbroath and Montrose.

==== East Kilbride loan ====
On 3 September 2026, Gill joined Scottish League One club East Kilbride on loan alongside 3 Celtic teammates as part of the co-operation agreement between the two clubs.

== International career ==
Born in Scotland, Gill was called up to the Republic of Ireland U16 squad for a training camp ahead of their Victory Shield campaign in October. Gill received his first international callup from his birth country in September 2022 for the Scotland U16 side and made his debut against Denmark U16. He then returned to the Ireland setup and made his Republic of Ireland U16 debut on 1 November 2022 in a penalty shootout win in the Victory Shield against Northern Ireland U16, saving 3 penalties in the shootout. In February 2023, Gill was promoted to the Under-17 squad, making his only appearance in a 0–0 friendly draw against Hungary. In October 2024, Gill was promoted into the Under-19 squad, playing in a 2–1 loss in a friendly to France. In September 2026, he was called up to the Republic of Ireland U21 side for the first time.

== Career statistics ==
As of match played 7 November 2026

Appearances and goals by club, season and competition
Club	Season	League			National cup (Note: Includes Scottish Cup)		League cup (Note: Includes Scottish League Cup)		Other		Total	
Club	Season	Division	Apps	Goals	Apps	Goals	Apps	Goals	Apps	Goals	Apps	Goals
Celtic B	2024–25	Lowland Football League	10	0	–						10	0
Celtic B	2025–26	Lowland Football League	16	0	–				2 (Note: Appearances in the Scottish Challenge Cup)	0	18	0
Celtic B	2026–27	Lowland Football League	–						1	0	1	0
Celtic B	Total		26	0	–				3	0	29	0
Inverness Caledonian Thistle (loan)	2024–25	Scottish League One	3	0	–		–		–		3	0
East Kilbride (loan)	2026–27	Scottish League One	3	0	0	0	–		–		3	0
Career total			32	0	0	0	0	0	3	0	35	0
