= East Kilbride F.C. =

Association football club in Scotland

East Kilbride
- Full name: East Kilbride Football Club
- Nicknames: The Kilby, EK
- Founded: May 2010; 16 years ago
- Ground: K-Park Training Academy, East Kilbride
- Capacity: 700 (400 seated)
- Coordinates: 55.750426°N 4.147332°W
- Chairman: Dr Sam Millar
- General manager: George Fraser
- Manager: Simon Ferry
- League: Scottish League One
- 2025–26: Scottish League Two, 1st of 10 (promoted)
- Website: eastkilbridefootballclub.co.uk
Home colours	Away colours

East Kilbride Football Club is a semi-professional football club based in East Kilbride, South Lanarkshire, Scotland. They are members of Scottish League One, the third tier of the Scottish football league system.

Formed in 2010 with the intention of bringing senior football to one of Scotland's largest towns, the club initially competed in amateur football before becoming one of the founder members of the Lowland League in 2013. The club became a full member of the Scottish Football Association (SFA) in 2014, entitling them to automatic entry to the Scottish Cup. East Kilbride became a member of the Scottish Professional Football League in 2025 after winning the Pyramid play-offs.

== History ==
The club was launched officially by two former Old Firm players, John Hartson and John Brown, once of Celtic and Rangers respectively. The club was resurrected after folding in the 19th century, having been initially founded in 1871.

=== Original club ===
The original club was formed in 1871, making it one of the earliest formed clubs in Scotland. The first office bearers included the quaintly titled Croupier, which today would be recognised as Treasurer. The first recorded match was a 1–0 defeat by a Queen's Park second eleven in April 1872. They drew 0–0 with the same team later that year. During the 1870s the club folded and resurrected several times, which was a regular occurrence at that time for football clubs. The original club colours were navy and gold according to evidence from the SFA Museum of Football. The original club did not have a badge, which was customary at the time too. The team played at Kirktonholme in 1876, winning three, losing nine and drawing three games. The team played at Show Park in 1877 and had a better season, winning six, losing six and drawing six. They participated in some of the earliest editions of the Scottish Cup in seasons 1878–79 and 1879–80, going out in the first round in both seasons.

=== Modern history ===
The club as it exists today was formed in May 2010 after the merger of Jackton Boys Club and Stewartfield FC. Later, local clubs EK Diamonds and EK Wanderers were incorporated into the structure. As yet they have no permanent home so they use the facilities at the training base, K-Park, until a site is found for a new stadium. They played in the inaugural season of the Lowland League, although they had previously been elected to the South of Scotland League at the end of the 2012–13 season. Two men, James Kean, a property developer and distiller, and Iain King, who is a sports journalist, spent many years in the hope that East Kilbride Thistle (the town's former highest ranked football team) would become a senior sports team so much that they officially launched their youth development programme from under-21s right down to the under-5s. The dream never materialised and they had to admit defeat, and so their vision was to form a new club. John Hartson, the former Celtic striker, was appointed honorary president of the new club. On 10 September 2010, the club held their inaugural fundraising dinner which was attended by around 250 people and raised about £9500.

The team played in the Scottish Amateur Football League until their election into the senior leagues in June 2013. They won the Division 2 title in 2011–12 and were crowned Division 1 champions in 2012–13. On 31 May 2013, East Kilbride were given a place in the South of Scotland League for season 2013–14. On 17 June 2013, East Kilbride were elected to play in the newly formed Lowland League, without playing a game in the South of Scotland League. Their first league fixtures were a 2–1 defeat at Stirling University (10th) and a 1–0 home win over Whitehill Welfare (13th) in August 2013. The Kilby completed a debut season as a senior team with a Lowland League mid-table finish, winning the South Region Challenge Cup and reaching the Lowland League Cup semi finals. They claimed their maiden trophy as a senior team with a 2–0 Final victory over Dalbeattie Star at Palmerston on 24 May 2014. They were granted full SFA membership in April 2014 and therefore could enter the Scottish Cup from season 2014–15. Their first Scottish Cup tie was a 1–0 first round win at Lothian Thistle on 13 September 2014. After a draw at Spartans in the next round, East Kilbride suffered a heavy home defeat in the replay. In only their second season in the Lowland League, East Kilbride secured a second-place finish with two games left, with a defeat of Edinburgh University in their final home game. A 3–1 defeat of Gretna 2008 in the Lowland League Cup final on 17 May 2015, delivered a second cup success in as many seasons.

On 5 November 2016, East Kilbride defeated BSC Glasgow 3–1 for a 27th consecutive victory and surpassed Ajax's record of 26 consecutive wins. On 19 November 2016, East Kilbride lost 0–1 to Spartans to end their winning streak at 30 games. East Kilbride won the 2016–17 Lowland League, and progressed to a promotion/relegation playoff with Scottish League Two club Cowdenbeath. They missed out on promotion to the SPFL after losing a penalty shootout. In that period, defender Craig Howie became the first player to make 100 appearances for the club, having made his debut aged 17 in 2013.

East Kilbride won their second Lowland League title during the 2018–19 season, beating defending champions Spartans at K Park to clinch the trophy. They lost to Cove Rangers in the SPFL promotion playoffs.

== Badge ==
The badge for the new club features the oystercatcher bird and also the colour red, symbols of St Bridgit, after whom East Kilbride is named, cill being the Gaelic word for a religious cell, which was the common form of ancient Celtic religious organisation, thus Kilbride being the religious cell associated with St Bridgit/St Bride; East to distinguish from West Kilbride in Ayrshire.

== John Hartson Foundation Trophy ==
The John Hartson Foundation Trophy is annual pre-season match at the K-Park between East Kilbride and another side, with all proceeds going towards Hartson's testicular cancer charity. The first match between East Kilbride and Fort William was supposed to take place on 20 July 2013, but Fort William cancelled the day before due to a shortage of players. The match did take place for the first time on 19 July 2014, with a strong Celtic under-20 team defeating East Kilbride 5–1.

== Current squad ==
As of 3 September 2026

Note: Flags indicate national team as defined under FIFA eligibility rules; some limited exceptions apply. Players may hold more than one non-FIFA nationality.

No.	Pos.	Nation	Player
1	GK	SCO	Shay Kelly
2	DF	SCO	Aaron Steele
3	DF	SCO	Andrew Kyle
4	DF	SCO	Jamie Hamilton
5	DF	SCO	Sean Fagan (vice-captain)
6	MF	SCO	Liam Kennedy (co-operation loan with Celtic)
7	MF	SCO	Lewis McGrattan
8	MF	POR	João Baldé
9	FW	SCO	Cameron Elliott (captain)
10	MF	LBA	Malik Zaid
11	MF	SCO	Craig McGuffie
12	MF	SCO	Euan Ross
14	FW	SCO	Callum Mckenzie

No.	Pos.	Nation	Player
15	MF	SCO	Barry Maguire
16	DF	SCO	Euan East
17	FW	SCO	Rhys Dargie (co-operation loan with Celtic)
18	MF	SCO	Finlay Gray
19	DF	SCO	Owen Calder
21	GK	IRL	Marcus Gill (co-operation loan with Celtic)
22	MF	SCO	Alexander Smith (on loan from Rangers)
23	DF	SCO	Mitchell Robertson (on loan from Livingston)
24	DF	IRL	Darragh O'Connor
25	MF	SCO	Rhys Armstrong
33	FW	SCO	Owen Moffat
36	FW	SCO	Sam Culbert (on loan from Livingston)

=== On loan ===
Note: Flags indicate national team as defined under FIFA eligibility rules; some limited exceptions apply. Players may hold more than one non-FIFA nationality.

No.	Pos.	Nation	Player
—	DF	SCO	Chris McKenna (on loan at Dumbarton)
—	FW	SCO	Lewis Harrison (on loan at East Stirlingshire)

No.	Pos.	Nation	Player
—	FW	SCO	Nathan Lawson (on loan at Kelty Hearts)

== Coaching staff ==
Position	Name
Manager	Simon Ferry
Assistant manager	Mick Kennedy
First team coaches	Scott Allan
First team coaches	James Creaney
First team coaches	Scott Duncan
First team coaches	Blair Munn
Goalkeeping coach	Zander Cowie
Physiotherapists	Stephen Fleming
Physiotherapists	Jonathan Lyons
Kit manager	Davie Shields

== Managerial history ==
East Kilbride have had ten permanent managers in their history:

- Iain King (14 May 2010 – 30 May 2014)
- Billy Ogilvie (12 June 2014 – 20 March 2016)
- Martin Lauchlan (21 March 2016 – 1 June 2017)
- Billy Stark (16 June 2017 – 2 May 2018)
- Brian Kerr (18 May 2018 – 15 October 2018)
- Stuart Malcolm (15 October 2018 – 10 November 2019)
- Stephen Aitken (1 June 2020 – 10 August 2021)
- Kevin Rutkiewicz (28 March 2022 – 24 March 2023)
- Mick Kennedy (22 April 2023 – 27 October 2026)
- Simon Ferry (27 October 2026 – present)

== Season-by-season record ==
Season	Division	Tier	League						Scottish Cup	Play-offs
Season	Division	Tier	Finish	Played	Wins	Draws	Losses	Points	Scottish Cup	Play-offs
East Kilbride F.C.
2013–14	Lowland League	5	8th	22	8	4	10	28	Did not participate	
2014–15	Lowland League	5	2nd	26	15	5	6	50	Second round, lost in replay to Spartans	
2015–16	Lowland League	5	5th	28	14	7	7	49	Fifth round, lost to Celtic	
2016–17	Lowland League	5	1st	30	24	3	3	75	Third round, lost to Stranraer	League Two play-off final, lost to Cowdenbeath
2017–18	Lowland League	5	2nd	30	22	5	3	71	Third round, lost to Albion Rovers	
2018–19	Lowland League	5	1st	28	23	3	2	72	Fourth round, lost to Inverness Caledonian Thistle	Pyramid play-off, lost to Cove Rangers
2019–20	Lowland League	5	7th†	23	11	4	8	37	Fourth round, lost to BSC Glasgow	
2020–21	Lowland League	5	2nd†	12	9	2	1	29	Preliminary round two, lost to Spartans	
2021–22	Lowland League	5	4th	34	22	5	7	71	Fourth round, lost to Peterhead	
2022–23	Lowland League	5	6th	36	17	9	10	64	Third round, lost to Hamilton Academical	
2023–24	Lowland League	5	1st	36	26	3	5	81	Second round, lost to Tranent	League Two play-off final, lost to Stranraer
2024–25	Lowland League	5	1st	34	24	5	5	77	Third round, lost to Falkirk	League Two play-off final, defeated Bonnyrigg Rose

† Season curtailed due to coronavirus pandemic.

== Honours ==
League

- Scottish League Two
  - Champions (1): 2025–26
- Lowland League
  - Champions (4): 2016–17, 2018–19, 2023–24, 2024–25
  - Runners up (3): 2014–15, 2017–18, 2020–21
- Scottish Amateur Football League Division 1
  - Champions: 2012–13
- Scottish Amateur Football League Division 2
  - Champions: 2011–12

Cup

- SFA South Region Challenge Cup:
  - Winners (4): 2013–14, 2016–17, 2018–19, 2023–24
- Lowland League Cup
  - Winners (5): 2014–15, 2015–16, 2021–22, 2022–23, 2024–25
- East of Scotland Qualifying Cup
  - Winners (2): 2015–16, 2017–18
- East of Scotland City Cup
  - Winners: 2015–16
- SAFL Coronation Cup
  - Runners up: 2012–13

== See also ==
- Category:East Kilbride F.C. players
- Category:East Kilbride F.C. managers
