= 2023–24 Lowland Football League =

Scottish Football league season

Lowland League
- Season: 2023–24
- Dates: 21 July 2023 – 27 April 2024
- Champions: East Kilbride
- Relegated: Edinburgh University
- Matches: 306
- Goals: 1,055 (3.45 per match)
- Biggest home win: Heart of Midlothian B 12–0 Edinburgh University (5 January 2024)
- Biggest away win: Edinburgh University 0–9 East Kilbride (2 September 2023)
- Highest scoring: Heart of Midlothian B 12–0 Edinburgh University (5 January 2024)
- Longest winning run: 8 matches: Heart of Midlothian B
- Longest unbeaten run: 15 matches: East Kilbride
- Longest winless run: 17 matches: Gretna 2008
- Longest losing run: 11 matches: Edinburgh University
- All statistics correct as of 27 April 2024.

The 2023–24 Scottish Lowland Football League was the 11th season of the Lowland Football League, part of the fifth tier of the Scottish football pyramid system. The Spartans were the reigning champions but were unable to defend their title following their promotion to Scottish League Two.

East Kilbride won a record-equalling third Lowland League title, following a 4–2 victory by Heart of Midlothian B – who cannot win the Lowland League as a guest club – over Bo'ness United on 12 April 2024, which left Bo'ness United nine points behind East Kilbride with two games remaining.

With their scheduled matchup with 2023–24 Highland Football League champion Buckie Thistle being cancelled due to the latter not holding the relevant licence, East Kilbride faced League Two bottom-placed team Stranraer in the final. They lost 3–5 on aggregate after conceding two goals in the last five minutes of extra time in the second leg at Stair Park.

== Teams ==
Location of teams in 2023–24 Scottish Lowland Football League
Location of teams in 2023–24 Scottish Lowland Football League

Albion Rovers became the fourth club to join the league via relegation from the SPFL, having lost the previous season's League Two play-off against The Spartans. East of Scotland League champions Linlithgow Rose were promoted to the league, replacing founding league member Dalbeattie Star who were relegated to the South of Scotland League.

Rangers B withdrew prior to the start of the season.

=== From Lowland League ===
Promoted to League Two

- The Spartans

Relegated to South of Scotland League

- Dalbeattie Star

Withdrew

- Rangers B

=== To Lowland League ===
Relegated from League Two

- Albion Rovers

Promoted from East of Scotland League

- Linlithgow Rose

=== Stadia and locations ===
Team	Location	Stadium	Surface	Capacity	Seats
Albion Rovers	Coatbridge	Cliftonhill	Grass	1,238	489
Berwick Rangers	Berwick-upon-Tweed	Shielfield Park	Grass	4,099	1,366
Bo'ness United	Bo'ness	Newtown Park	Artificial	2,000	0
Broomhill	Dumbarton	Dumbarton Football Stadium (Note: Broomhill are ground-sharing with Dumbarton.)	Grass	2,020	2,020
Caledonian Braves	Motherwell	Alliance Park	Artificial	800	102
Celtic B	Airdrie	Excelsior Stadium (Note: Celtic B are ground-sharing with Airdrieonians.)	Artificial	10,101	10,101
Civil Service Strollers	Edinburgh	Christie Gillies Park	Grass	1,596	96
Cowdenbeath	Cowdenbeath	Central Park	Grass	4,309	1,622
Cumbernauld Colts	Cumbernauld	Broadwood Stadium	Artificial	8,086	8,086
East Kilbride	East Kilbride	K-Park	Artificial	700	400
East Stirlingshire	Falkirk	Falkirk Stadium (Note: East Stirlingshire are ground-sharing with Falkirk.)	Artificial	7,937	7,937
Edinburgh University	Edinburgh	New Peffermill Stadium	Grass	1,100	100
Gala Fairydean Rovers	Galashiels	3G Arena, Netherdale	Artificial	2,000	500
Gretna 2008	Gretna	Raydale Park	Artificial	1,030	138
Heart of Midlothian B	Edinburgh	Ainslie Park (Note: Heart of Midlothian B are ground-sharing with The Spartans.)	Artificial	3,700	854
Linlithgow Rose	Linlithgow	Prestonfield	Grass	1,730	301
Tranent	Tranent	Foresters Park	Grass	1,200	44
University of Stirling	Stirling	Forthbank Stadium (Note: University of Stirling are ground-sharing with Stirling Albion.)	Grass	3,808	2,508

Notes

All grounds are equipped with floodlights.

== League table ==
Pos	Team	Pld	W	D	L	GF	GA	GD	Pts	Qualification or relegation
1	East Kilbride (C)	34	26	3	5	96	43	+53	81	Qualification for the Pyramid play-off
2	Heart of Midlothian B	34	21	6	7	92	43	+49	69	Ineligible for promotion or relegation
3	Bo'ness United	34	21	4	9	72	50	+22	67	
4	Cumbernauld Colts	34	19	8	7	70	43	+27	65	
5	Tranent	34	18	6	10	69	42	+27	60	
6	Celtic B	34	18	5	11	80	47	+33	59	Ineligible for promotion or relegation
7	Civil Service Strollers	34	17	5	12	51	48	+3	56	
8	Linlithgow Rose	34	14	8	12	63	43	+20	50	
9	Albion Rovers	34	12	10	12	43	36	+7	46	
10	Cowdenbeath	34	12	10	12	55	56	−1	46	
11	University of Stirling	34	13	7	14	50	53	−3	46	
12	Caledonian Braves	34	12	9	13	47	43	+4	45	
13	Berwick Rangers	34	12	6	16	42	48	−6	42	
14	East Stirlingshire	34	12	4	18	58	68	−10	40	
15	Broomhill	34	11	6	17	56	59	−3	39	
16	Gala Fairydean Rovers	34	9	5	20	45	87	−42	32	
17	Gretna 2008	34	3	3	28	26	114	−88	12	
18	Edinburgh University (R)	34	2	3	29	40	132	−92	9	Relegation to the East of Scotland League

Source: SLFL BBC Sport Soccerway
Rules for classification: 1) Points; 2) Goal difference; 3) Number of goals scored
(C) Champions; (R) Relegated

== Results ==
Home \ Away	ALB	BER	BNS	BRO	CAL	CEL	CSS	COW	CUM	EKB	EAS	EDU	GFR	GRE	HEA	LIN	TRA	STI
Albion Rovers		1–0	0–0	2–1	2–1	1–1	1–2	0–1	1–0	0–2	3–1	1–2	3–0	1–0	1–2	3–0	1–3	0–1
Berwick Rangers	2–1		1–2	4–0	0–2	2–1	1–0	0–2	0–0	0–1	1–2	2–0	3–3	3–0	2–2	1–2	2–2	2–2
Bo'ness United	0–1	5–1		3–0	2–1	1–0	3–2	4–2	0–3	3–4	4–2	3–1	3–0	2–0	3–3	0–0	0–2	3–2
Broomhill	1–1	2–0	1–1		2–0	1–2	4–2	0–1	2–2	1–6	3–1	4–0	2–3	4–1	1–2	2–0	1–3	0–4
Caledonian Braves	1–1	1–0	1–2	3–1		4–2	0–1	3–2	1–2	1–2	0–1	4–2	2–1	4–0	2–1	0–1	2–2	0–0
Celtic B	2–1	1–0	3–1	2–0	5–1		7–0	2–2	3–0	0–2	1–2	4–0	5–0	7–0	2–1	3–0	2–1	1–0
Civil Service Strollers	1–0	1–0	2–0	0–3	1–1	3–1		1–1	3–1	2–1	0–0	3–1	7–0	1–0	2–3	2–1	1–2	0–2
Cowdenbeath	0–0	1–4	0–2	0–0	2–2	3–3	2–2		0–2	2–1	1–2	7–1	2–2	2–1	2–1	1–1	0–2	2–2
Cumbernauld Colts	1–1	2–1	2–1	2–1	2–0	1–0	0–0	4–2		1–2	1–1	4–1	2–1	6–0	1–2	1–1	1–5	3–3
East Kilbride	1–3	1–0	0–2	2–1	0–0	2–1	2–0	4–2	2–0		2–1	7–4	4–2	4–1	2–4	2–1	3–2	4–2
East Stirlingshire	3–2	1–2	3–4	3–4	1–1	6–4	0–2	2–3	0–3	0–2		3–1	0–1	3–2	1–1	2–1	1–2	2–3
Edinburgh University	2–2	1–3	2–4	1–1	1–3	1–3	3–4	0–2	2–3	0–9	0–3		0–5	3–2	0–4	1–5	1–6	1–4
Gala Fairydean Rovers	0–0	2–0	1–5	2–7	0–3	3–4	1–2	1–2	1–4	1–6	2–0	2–1		4–1	1–1	1–6	0–2	2–0
Gretna 2008	0–4	0–1	1–2	1–0	0–1	3–3	2–1	2–3	1–4	0–7	1–4	2–1	0–0		0–3	2–9	1–3	1–1
Heart of Midlothian B	2–1	6–0	4–2	3–2	1–1	2–1	3–0 (Note: The match was abandoned after 77 minutes due to a medical emergency, with the score at the time standing as the final result.)	1–2	1–3	4–2	5–3	12–0	3–1	7–0		2–2	3–0	0–1
Linlithgow Rose	0–1	1–1	1–2	1–0	1–0	2–2	2–0	0–1	2–4	2–2	2–0	2–2	5–0	5–0	0–1		1–0	3–1
Tranent	1–1	0–1	1–2	0–0	1–1	1–0	0–1	1–0	2–2	0–3	3–4	6–2	2–1	8–0	0–1	2–1		2–1
University of Stirling	2–2	0–2	3–1	1–4	1–0	0–2	0–2	2–1	0–3	1–1	1–0	3–2	0–1	3–1	2–1	1–2	1–2	

Legend: Blue = home team win; Yellow = draw; Red = away team win.

== Lowland League play-off ==
A three-match round robin play-off was scheduled to take place between the winners of the 2023–24 East of Scotland Football League, the 2023–24 South of Scotland Football League, and the 2023–24 West of Scotland Football League, subject to all three clubs meeting the required licensing criteria for promotion. However, as West of Scotland Football League winners Beith Juniors did not hold a licence, the play-off was then contested by the remaining two league winners – Broxburn Athletic (East of Scotland Football League) and Dalbeattie Star (South of Scotland Football League) – over a home-and-away basis.

=== First leg ===
18 May 2024	Dalbeattie Star	1–4	Broxburn Athletic	Dalbeattie
15:00	C. Watson 40'	Report	Page 6'; Brass 31', 61'; Locke 65'	Stadium: Islecroft Stadium; Attendance: 300; Referee: Andy Gamble

=== Second leg ===
24 May 2024	Broxburn Athletic	8–1 (12–2 agg.)	Dalbeattie Star	Broxburn
19:45	Brass 11', 26', 68'; Douglas 16'; Jones 20', 45'; Munro 72'; Bremner 84'		Rogerson 6'	Stadium: Albyn Park; Attendance: 932; Referee: Jordan Curran
