= 2024–25 Lowland Football League =

Scottish Football league season

Lowland League
- Season: 2024–25
- Dates: 26 July 2024 – 25 April 2025
- Champions: East Kilbride
- Promoted: East Kilbride
- Relegated: Broomhill
- Matches: 306
- Goals: 1,079 (3.53 per match)
- Top goalscorer: Cameron Elliott (East Kilbride); (25 goals)
- Biggest home win: East Kilbride 7–0 University of Stirling (10 August 2024); Tranent 7–0 Gala Fairydean Rovers (3 September 2024); Celtic B 7–0 University of Stirling (20 December 2024)
- Biggest away win: Berwick Rangers 0–7 University of Stirling (20 August 2024)
- Highest scoring: East Kilbride 8–3 Cowdenbeath (16 October 2024)
- Longest winning run: 7 matches: East Kilbride
- Longest unbeaten run: 15 matches: Caledonian Braves
- Longest winless run: 13 matches: Cumbernauld Colts
- Longest losing run: 5 matches: Bo'ness United & Tranent
- Highest attendance: 1,039; Linlithgow Rose 3–2 Bo'ness United (1 March 2025)
- Lowest attendance: 30; University of Stirling 2–1 Civil Service Strollers (10 November 2024)
- Average attendance: 222
- All statistics correct as of 19 May 2025.

The 2024–25 Scottish Lowland Football League (known as the Park's Motor Group Scottish Lowland Football League for sponsorship reasons) was the 12th season of the Lowland Football League, part of the fifth tier of the Scottish football pyramid system. East Kilbride were the reigning champions, and remained in the league having been unable to gain promotion via the League Two play-off for the third time.

East Kilbride ultimately won a record fourth Lowland League title, as a result of a 1–1 draw between Celtic B and Caledonian Braves on 29 March 2025, with four matches still to play. After defeating Brora Rangers 7–4 in the pyramid play-off, East Kilbride beat Bonnyrigg Rose 3–1 in the play-off final to gain promotion to the Scottish Professional Football League for the first time.

== Teams ==
Location of teams in 2024–25 Scottish Lowland Football League

East of Scotland League champions Broxburn Athletic were promoted from tier 6, replacing Edinburgh University who had spent 10 seasons in the league.

=== From Lowland League ===
Relegated to East of Scotland League

- Edinburgh University

=== To Lowland League ===
Promoted from East of Scotland League

- Broxburn Athletic

=== Stadia and locations ===
Team	Location	Stadium	Surface	Capacity	Seats
Albion Rovers	Coatbridge	Cliftonhill	Grass	1,572	489
Berwick Rangers	Berwick-upon-Tweed	Shielfield Park	Grass	4,099	1,366
Bo'ness United	Bo'ness	Newtown Park	Artificial	2,000	0
Broomhill	Dumbarton	Dumbarton Football Stadium (Note: Broomhill ground-sharing with Dumbarton.)	Grass	2,020	2,020
Broxburn Athletic	Broxburn	Albyn Park	Artificial	2,050	0
Caledonian Braves	Motherwell	Alliance Park	Artificial	800	102
Celtic B	Airdrie	Excelsior Stadium (Note: Celtic B ground-sharing with Airdrieonians.)	Artificial	10,101	10,101
Civil Service Strollers	Edinburgh	Christie Gillies Park	Grass	1,596	96
Cowdenbeath	Cowdenbeath	Central Park	Grass	4,309	1,622
Cumbernauld Colts	Cumbernauld	Broadwood Stadium	Artificial	8,086	8,086
East Kilbride	East Kilbride	K-Park	Artificial	700	400
East Stirlingshire	Falkirk	Falkirk Stadium (Note: East Stirlingshire ground-sharing with Falkirk.)	Artificial	7,937	7,937
Gala Fairydean Rovers	Galashiels	3G Arena, Netherdale	Artificial	2,000	500
Gretna 2008	Gretna	Raydale Park	Artificial	1,030	138
Heart of Midlothian B	Edinburgh	Ainslie Park (Note: Heart of Midlothian B ground-sharing with The Spartans.)	Artificial	3,700	854
Linlithgow Rose	Linlithgow	Prestonfield	Grass	1,730	301
Tranent	Tranent	Foresters Park	Grass	1,200	44
University of Stirling	Stirling	Forthbank Stadium (Note: University of Stirling ground-sharing with Stirling Albion.)	Grass	3,808	2,508

Notes

All grounds are equipped with floodlights.

== League table ==
Pos	Team	Pld	W	D	L	GF	GA	GD	Pts	Qualification or relegation
1	East Kilbride (C, O, P)	34	24	5	5	114	45	+69	77	Qualification for the Pyramid play-off
2	Celtic B	34	20	10	4	90	39	+51	70	Ineligible for promotion or relegation
3	Caledonian Braves	34	18	9	7	60	34	+26	63	
4	Tranent	34	18	7	9	76	52	+24	61	
5	Linlithgow Rose	34	18	7	9	59	42	+17	61	
6	Albion Rovers	34	15	9	10	63	44	+19	54	
7	Broxburn Athletic	34	15	6	13	63	58	+5	51	
8	Civil Service Strollers	34	13	8	13	57	61	−4	47	
9	East Stirlingshire	34	12	7	15	54	67	−13	43	
10	Cowdenbeath	34	10	12	12	58	62	−4	42	
11	Heart of Midlothian B	34	11	7	16	61	67	−6	40	Ineligible for promotion or relegation
12	Bo'ness United	34	10	9	15	51	63	−12	39	
13	University of Stirling	34	8	11	15	51	80	−29	35	
14	Cumbernauld Colts	34	9	7	18	46	69	−23	34	
15	Gretna 2008	34	8	9	17	39	62	−23	33	
16	Berwick Rangers	34	8	9	17	32	73	−41	33	
17	Gala Fairydean Rovers	34	8	7	19	62	86	−24	31	
18	Broomhill (R)	34	8	7	19	43	75	−32	31	Dissolved

Source: SLFL BBC Sport Soccerway
Rules for classification: 1) Points; 2) Goal difference; 3) Number of goals scored
(C) Champions; (O) Play-off winners; (P) Promoted; (R) Relegated

== Results ==
Home \ Away	ALB	BER	BNS	BRO	BRX	CAL	CEL	CSS	COW	CUM	EKB	EAS	GFR	GRE	HEA	LIN	TRA	STI
Albion Rovers		0–0	0–0	3–2	0–3	1–1	0–1	2–1	1–0	1–2	0–3	2–2	3–3	5–0	3–0	2–1	2–2	5–0
Berwick Rangers	2–0		0–1	1–1	4–1	0–3	0–0	1–4	0–0	1–0	1–7	0–4	1–2	2–2	1–2	1–0	1–2	0–7
Bo'ness United	2–1	1–1		2–3	0–0	1–2	3–3	3–2	0–5	1–3	2–4	2–1	2–2	3–0	4–3	1–3	1–2	2–3
Broomhill	2–2	0–0	1–2		0–4	0–1	0–5	2–1 (Note: Match played at Ochilview Park, Stenhousemuir.)	2–0	3–0	0–5	0–1	3–2	0–1	1–1	1–3	0–3	3–3
Broxburn Athletic	0–5	3–0	2–2	3–1		1–0	1–1	1–2	4–0	3–0	1–4	5–0	3–0	1–6	0–3	3–1	2–1	2–2
Caledonian Braves	1–3	2–2	2–1	1–0	1–1		5–1	3–0	0–0	3–2	4–1	1–0	6–0	0–0	3–2	0–2	0–1	3–2
Celtic B	4–0	0–0	3–1	5–1	5–1	1–1		4–1	6–4	1–0	0–2	5–1	2–2	4–0	2–2	3–0	6–0	7–0
Civil Service Strollers	1–2	1–2	1–0	1–1	0–0	3–1	1–1		2–1	4–3	1–2	0–0	4–2	3–1	2–5	0–1	2–1	3–2
Cowdenbeath	1–1	2–0	1–2	4–1	1–3	1–1	2–2	2–2		1–1	1–4	3–0	4–1	2–1	3–3	2–0	2–2	2–1
Cumbernauld Colts	1–1	3–0	1–1	2–4	2–0	1–2	3–2	1–4	3–2		2–1	2–3	0–6	0–1	0–0	2–0	1–4	0–1
East Kilbride	2–1	5–0	3–1	4–1	1–0	0–2	1–5	7–1	8–3	1–1		3–0	7–1	3–1	4–1	0–2	3–3	7–0
East Stirlingshire	1–4	2–3	1–1	5–0	1–6	0–4	4–2	1–1	3–1	5–0	1–6		2–0	3–0	1–2	1–0	3–1	2–2
Gala Fairydean Rovers	3–4	1–2	3–1	3–2	1–2	1–2	0–2	2–2	1–2	4–4	4–4	1–2		0–2	1–5	2–3	1–2	5–0
Gretna 2008	0–3	3–0	0–1	1–1	0–2	2–2	0–1	1–2	1–1	1–0	0–5	0–0	0–2		6–1	1–3	2–2	3–3
Heart of Midlothian B	0–3	6–1	0–2	0–2	1–0	0–1	1–2	0–2	0–0	1–2	2–3	4–1	0–4	4–1		1–1	0–1	3–1
Linlithgow Rose	2–1	3–0	3–2	2–1	6–2	1–0	1–2	1–1	3–1	3–1	0–0	2–1	1–1	0–0	3–4		2–2	2–2
Tranent	0–2	2–3	2–1	1–2	5–2	2–1	0–0	3–1	2–3	3–2	2–2	3–1	7–0	3–1	4–2	0–1		3–0
University of Stirling	1–0	3–2	2–2	3–2	2–1	1–1	1–2	2–1	1–1	1–1	1–2	1–1	0–1	0–1	2–2	1–3	0–5	

Legend: Blue = home team win; Yellow = draw; Red = away team win.

== Lowland League play-off ==
A three-match round robin play-off was scheduled to take place between the winners of the 2024–25 East of Scotland Football League, the 2024–25 South of Scotland Football League, and the 2024–25 West of Scotland Football League, subject to all three clubs meeting the required licensing criteria for promotion. However, as South of Scotland Football League winners Lochar Thistle did not hold a licence, the play-off was contested by the remaining two league winners – Clydebank (West of Scotland Football League) and Musselburgh Athletic (East of Scotland Football League) – over a home-and-away basis.

=== First leg ===
17 May 2025	Musselburgh Athletic	1–1	Clydebank	Musselburgh
15:00	Smith 4'		Samson 42'	Stadium: Olivebank Stadium; Attendance: 920; Referee: Gary Hanvidge

=== Second leg ===
25 May 2025	Clydebank	2–0 (3–1 agg.)	Musselburgh Athletic	Clydebank
15:00	Truesdale 62'; Little 75' (pen.)			Stadium: Holm Park; Attendance: 1,170; Referee: Sean Murdoch
