= 2019–20 Lowland Football League =

Lowland League
- Season: 2019–20
- Dates: 27 July 2019 – 13 April 2020
- Champions: Kelty Hearts
- Relegated: None
- Matches: 195
- Goals: 713 (3.66 per match)
- Top goalscorer: Nathan Austin (Kelty Hearts) (37 goals)
- Biggest home win: Kelty Hearts 11–0 Vale of Leithen (14 December 2019)
- Biggest away win: Vale of Leithen 0–7 Kelty Hearts (24 August 2019)
- Highest scoring: Kelty Hearts 11–0 Vale of Leithen (14 December 2019)
- Longest winning run: 14 matches: Bonnyrigg Rose Athletic
- Longest unbeaten run: 21 matches: Kelty Hearts
- Longest winless run: 15 matches: Edinburgh University
- Longest losing run: 8 matches: Vale of Leithen
- Highest attendance: 1,510; Kelty Hearts 3–2 Bonnyrigg Rose Athletic (29 February 2020)

The 2019–20 Scottish Lowland Football League was the seventh season of the Lowland Football League, the fifth tier of the Scottish football pyramid system. East Kilbride were the reigning champions.

The season began on 27 July 2019 and was scheduled to end on 18 April 2020, but on 13 March, the league was indefinitely suspended due to the 2019–20 coronavirus outbreak. A points per game formula was subsequently used to determine the final standings, with Kelty Hearts declared champions on 13 April.

== Teams ==
Location of teams in 2019–20 Scottish Lowland Football League

The following teams changed division after the 2018–19 season.

Berwick Rangers became the second club to join the league via relegation from the SPFL, having lost the previous season's League Two play-off against Cove Rangers. East of Scotland League champions Bonnyrigg Rose Athletic were promoted to the league, replacing Whitehill Welfare who were relegated. Edusport Academy renamed to Caledonian Braves prior to the season.

=== To Lowland League ===
Relegated from League Two

- Berwick Rangers

Promoted from East of Scotland League

- Bonnyrigg Rose Athletic

=== From Lowland League ===
Relegated to East of Scotland League

- Whitehill Welfare

Folded

- Selkirk

=== Stadia and locations ===
Team	Location	Stadium	Capacity	Seats
Berwick Rangers	Berwick-upon-Tweed	Shielfield Park	4,099	1,366
Bonnyrigg Rose Athletic	Bonnyrigg	New Dundas Park	2,200	0
BSC Glasgow	Alloa	Recreation Park (Note: BSC Glasgow are ground-sharing with Alloa Athletic due to the lack of a suitable venue in Glasgow.)	3,100	919
Caledonian Braves	Motherwell	Alliance Park	500	100
Civil Service Strollers	Edinburgh	Christie Gillies Park	1,569	100
Cumbernauld Colts	Cumbernauld	Broadwood Stadium	8,086	8,086
Dalbeattie Star	Dalbeattie	Islecroft Stadium	1,320	100
East Kilbride	East Kilbride	K Park	660	400
East Stirlingshire	Falkirk	Falkirk Stadium (Note: East Stirlingshire are ground-sharing with Falkirk.)	7,937	7,937
Edinburgh University	Edinburgh	New Peffermill Stadium	1,100	100
Gala Fairydean Rovers	Galashiels	3G Arena, Netherdale	2,000	500
Gretna 2008	Gretna	Raydale Park	1,030	138
Kelty Hearts	Kelty	New Central Park	2,181	353
The Spartans	Edinburgh	Ainslie Park	3,612	534
University of Stirling	Stirling	Forthbank Stadium (Note: University of Stirling are ground-sharing with Stirling Albion.)	3,808	2,508
Vale of Leithen	Innerleithen	Victoria Park	1,500	0

Notes

All grounds are equipped with floodlights, except Victoria Park (Vale of Leithen).

=== Personnel and kits ===
Team	Manager	Captain	Kit manufacturer	Shirt sponsor
Berwick Rangers	(Scotland) Ian Little	(Scotland) Euan Smith	Hummel	Michael Guthrie Developments
Bonnyrigg Rose Athletic	(Scotland) Robbie Horn	(Scotland) Jonathan Stewart	Macron	G. Fitzsimmons and Son
BSC Glasgow	(Scotland) Stephen Swift	(Scotland) Ross McMillan	Joma	Nicholson Accountancy
Caledonian Braves	(Scotland) Ricky Waddell	(Scotland) Alan Reid	Macron	
Civil Service Strollers	(Scotland) Gary Jardine	(Scotland) Mark McConnell	Legea	Futurity Financial Services
Cumbernauld Colts	(Scotland) Craig McKinlay & James Orr	(Scotland) Stephen O'Neill	Uhlsport	MES Ltd
Dalbeattie Star	(Scotland) Ritchie Maxwell	(Scotland) Vinnie Parker	Joma	Solway Plant Hire
East Kilbride		(Scotland) Craig Malcolm	Joma	Enviro-Clean
East Stirlingshire	(Scotland) Derek Ure	(Scotland) Jamie Barclay	EV2 Sportswear	Central Industrial Services
Edinburgh University	(Scotland) Dorian Ogunro	(England) Finn Daniels-Yeomans	PlayerLayer	TWEDEX
Gala Fairydean Rovers	(Scotland) Neil Hastings	(Scotland) Danny Galbraith	Adidas	Five Star Taxis
Gretna 2008	(Scotland) Rowan Alexander	(Canada) Joe Jackson	Macron	Welzh Wertzeug
Kelty Hearts	(Scotland) Barry Ferguson	(Scotland) Gary Cennerazzo	Joma	The Conservatory Converters
The Spartans	(Scotland) Douglas Samuel	(Scotland) Adam Corbett	Macron	Arthur McKay
University of Stirling	(Scotland) Chris Geddes	(Scotland) Angus Mailer	VSN	Mackay Clinic
Vale of Leithen	(Scotland) Chris Anderson	(Scotland) Ger Rossi	Adidas	WillSweep

=== Managerial changes ===
Team	Outgoing manager	Manner of departure	Date of vacancy	Position in table	Incoming manager	Date of appointment
East Kilbride	(Scotland) Stuart Malcolm	Signed by Forfar Athletic	10 November 2019	8th		
Gretna 2008	(Jamaica) Chris Humphrey	Sacked	30 November 2019	14th	(Scotland) Rowan Alexander	2 December 2019

== League summary ==
=== League table ===
With the season not being fully completed, a points per game formula was subsequently used to determine the final standings, with Kelty Hearts declared champions on 13 April. Only two teams' league positions were changed as a result; with BSC Glasgow's 2.32 points average moving them past the 2.04 of East Stirlingshire for third place.

Pos	Team	Pld	W	D	L	GF	GA	GD	Pts	PPG
1	Kelty Hearts (C)	25	22	2	1	95	17	+78	68	2.72
2	Bonnyrigg Rose Athletic	24	20	2	2	70	22	+48	62	2.58
3	BSC Glasgow (Note: BSC Glasgow finished third based on the 'points per game' measure, despite accumulating fewer points than East Stirlingshire.)	22	16	3	3	58	21	+37	51	2.32
4	East Stirlingshire	26	17	2	7	77	29	+48	53	2.04
5	The Spartans	25	16	1	8	49	32	+17	49	1.96
6	Civil Service Strollers	23	12	3	8	40	38	+2	39	1.70
7	East Kilbride	23	11	4	8	43	24	+19	37	1.61
8	Caledonian Braves	26	11	3	12	57	55	+2	36	1.38
9	Cumbernauld Colts	27	10	6	11	49	50	−1	36	1.33
10	University of Stirling	25	9	4	12	28	44	−16	31	1.24
11	Gala Fairydean Rovers	25	7	6	12	39	55	−16	27	1.08
12	Berwick Rangers	24	6	6	12	32	41	−9	24	1.00
13	Gretna 2008	24	2	6	16	21	62	−41	12	0.50
14	Edinburgh University	25	2	6	17	18	66	−48	12	0.48
15	Dalbeattie Star	23	3	2	18	19	68	−49	11	0.48
16	Vale of Leithen	23	2	2	19	18	89	−71	8	0.35

Source: SLFL BBC Sport Soccerway
Rules for classification: 1) Points; 2) Goal difference; 3) Number of goals scored
(C) Champions

=== Positions by round ===
The table lists the positions of teams after each round of matches. In order to preserve chronological progress, any postponed matches are not included in the round at which they were originally scheduled, but added to the full round they were played immediately afterwards. For example, if a match is scheduled for matchday 13, but then postponed and played between days 16 and 17, it will be added to the standings for day 16.

Qualification for the Pyramid play-off
Possible relegation to the EoSFL or SoSFL
Relegation to the EoSFL or SoSFL

Team \ Round	1	2	3	4	5	6	7	8	9	10	11	12	13	14	15	16	17	18	19	20	21	22	23	24	25	26	27	28	29	30
Kelty Hearts	1	6	4	2	2	2	2	2	2	2	2	1	1	1	1	1	1	1	1	1	1	1	1	1	1	1	1			
Bonnyrigg Rose Athletic	2	1	2	1	1	1	1	1	1	1	1	2	2	2	3	2	2	2	2	2	2	2	2	2	2	2	2			
East Stirlingshire	7	4	1	4	9	7	5	8	5	5	4	3	3	3	2	3	3	4	4	3	3	3	3	3	3	3	3			
BSC Glasgow	6	5	9	5	4	6	4	3	3	3	3	4	4	4	4	4	4	3	3	4	4	4	4	4	4	4	4			
The Spartans	10	10	10	9	7	9	8	6	8	8	8	9	7	7	6	6	6	5	5	6	6	5	5	5	5	5	5			
Civil Service Strollers	4	3	3	7	8	5	3	7	4	4	5	5	5	5	5	5	5	6	6	5	5	6	6	6	6	6	6			
East Kilbride	9	8	5	8	6	8	6	4	6	6	7	7	8	8	9	9	9	9	8	8	8	7	7	7	7	7	7			
Caledonian Braves	3	2	6	3	3	3	7	5	7	7	6	6	6	6	8	8	7	7	7	7	7	8	9	8	8	9	8			
Cumbernauld Colts	5	7	7	6	5	4	9	9	9	9	9	8	9	9	7	7	8	8	9	9	9	9	8	9	9	8	9			
University of Stirling	11	11	11	11	11	10	10	10	10	10	10	10	10	10	10	10	10	10	10	10	10	10	10	10	10	10	10			
Gala Fairydean Rovers	12	9	8	10	10	11	11	11	11	11	12	13	11	11	11	11	11	11	12	12	11	11	11	11	11	12	11			
Berwick Rangers	8	12	12	13	14	12	12	13	13	13	13	12	13	12	12	12	12	12	11	11	12	12	12	12	12	11	12			
Gretna 2008	13	13	14	14	15	15	15	15	16	16	16	14	14	14	14	14	14	14	14	14	14	13	13	13	13	13	13			
Edinburgh University	14	16	15	12	12	13	13	14	14	14	14	15	15	15	15	15	15	15	16	16	16	15	15	14	14	14	14			
Dalbeattie Star	16	15	13	16	13	14	14	12	12	12	11	11	12	13	13	13	13	13	13	13	13	14	14	15	15	15	15			
Vale of Leithen	15	14	16	15	16	16	16	16	15	15	15	16	16	16	16	16	16	16	15	15	15	16	16	16	16	16	16			

Source: Lowland League Table
Updated: 29 February 2020

== Results ==
Home \ Away	BER	BON	BSC	CAL	CSS	CUM	DAL	EKB	EAS	EDU	GFR	GRE	KEL	SPA	STI	VOL
Berwick Rangers		3–5	0–1	1–0	1–3	2–2	3–0	0–2	1–5	2–0	2–2	2–1	0–1	N/A	1–2	4–0
Bonnyrigg Rose Athletic	N/A		1–3	3–0	1–1	5–1	3–0	2–0	3–1	4–0	N/A	N/A	N/A	N/A	5–1	6–0
BSC Glasgow	4–1	2–3		6–1	4–1	3–1	5–0	1–1	1–1	N/A	4–0	4–1	N/A	1–0	3–0	3–0
Caledonian Braves	2–2	2–3	1–4		7–2	N/A	5–5	0–2	0–3	2–1	0–0	3–2	1–4	N/A	3–0	4–1
Civil Service Strollers	N/A	1–1	N/A	2–0		2–3	3–0	N/A	N/A	3–0	2–2	1–0	2–3	1–2	1–0	N/A
Cumbernauld Colts	0–0	0–2	2–1	3–1	0–2		3–0	2–2	1–4	4–1	N/A	0–1	2–1	0–1	2–0	7–1
Dalbeattie Star	N/A	0–1	N/A	N/A	N/A	1–4		0–2	0–4	1–0	0–1	1–1	0–4	1–2	0–1	1–3
East Kilbride	3–2	0–1	4–0	1–3	0–1	7–0	3–1		N/A	5–0	2–2	2–0	0–1	1–4	0–1	N/A
East Stirlingshire	3–1	N/A	0–1	1–3	2–1	3–1	6–1	0–1		4–0	5–2	9–1	0–1	2–3	1–2	6–1
Edinburgh University	0–1	0–4	N/A	0–6	1–3	1–0	N/A	2–2	0–3		2–3	1–1	N/A	2–5	1–1	3–1
Gala Fairydean Rovers	2–2	1–5	0–3	3–1	4–0	0–3	N/A	N/A	0–3	N/A		4–1	1–2	0–2	2–0	1–3
Gretna 2008	1–1	1–2	N/A	1–5	0–3	0–0	2–4	N/A	N/A	0–0	3–3		1–3	N/A	1–2	2–0
Kelty Hearts	N/A	3–2	2–2	4–1	5–0	N/A	8–0	1–0	2–2	7–1	3–0	10–0		5–0	2–1	11–0
The Spartans	1–0	2–3	1–2	1–3	0–1	3–2	4–0	N/A	1–3	2–0	4–0	1–0	0–1		3–2	2–1
University of Stirling	1–0	0–3	N/A	N/A	N/A	4–4	0–3	N/A	1–3	1–1	2–1	1–0	1–4	0–0		4–0
Vale of Leithen	N/A	0–2	N/A	0–3	2–4	2–2	N/A	0–3	0–3	1–1	1–5	N/A	0–7	1–5	N/A	

Source: SLFL
Legend: Blue = home team win; Yellow = draw; Red = away team win.

== Top scorers ==
As of 8 March 2020

Rank	Player	Club	Goals
1	(England) Nathan Austin	Kelty Hearts	37
2	(Scotland) Ross McNeil	Caledonian Braves	17
3	(Scotland) Jamie Dishington	East Stirlingshire	16
4	(Scotland) Thomas Collins	BSC Glasgow	14
4	(Scotland) Neil McLaughlin	Caledonian Braves	14
4	(Scotland) Thomas Orr	BSC Glasgow	14
7	(Scotland) Sean Brown	East Stirlingshire	13
7	(Scotland) Scott Linton	Kelty Hearts	13
7	(Scotland) Marty Wright	Cumbernauld Colts	13
10	(Scotland) George Hunter	Bonnyrigg Rose Athletic	12
10	(Scotland) Nicky Low	East Stirlingshire	12

== League Cup ==
A 16-team straight knock-out tournament was scheduled to take place over four weekends at the end of the league season. Following the suspension of all Scottish football until the end of April due to the COVID-19 pandemic in Scotland, the League Cup was cancelled.

== Lowland League play-off ==
A play-off match was scheduled to take place between the winners of the 2019–20 East of Scotland Football League and the 2019–20 South of Scotland Football League, subject to both clubs meeting the required licensing criteria for promotion. This was cancelled following the South of Scotland Football League declaring their season null and void. As a result, East of Scotland Football League winners Bo'ness United were promoted subject to SFA approval.
