= Gary Cennerazzo =

Scottish footballer

Personal information
- Date of birth: 7 November 1989 (age 37)
- Place of birth: Edinburgh, Scotland
- Position: Defender

Youth career
- Rangers
- Spartans

Senior career*
Years	Team	Apps	(Gls)
2007–2009	Cowdenbeath		
2009–2011	Arniston Rangers		
2011–2012	Edinburgh City		
2012–2015	Spartans		
2015	→ Melleruds IF (loan)		
2016	Tulsa Roughnecks	22	(0)
2017	FK Varnsdorf	11	(1)
2018–2019	Spartans		
2019–2020	Kelty Hearts		
- * Club domestic league appearances and goals

Gary Cennerazzo (born 7 November 1989) is a Scottish former footballer.

== Career ==
Cennerazzo had spells in his native Scotland with Cowdenbeath, Arniston Rangers, Edinburgh City and Spartans. In 2015, he spent time on loan in Sweden with Melleruds IF, before moving to the United States with United Soccer League side Tulsa Roughnecks. After that, he signed for FK Varnsdorf in the Czech second division after impressing on trial in Portugal.

He returned to Spartans in March 2018. and then moved to Lowland League rivals Kelty Hearts in June 2019.

Cennerazzo became captain of Kelty Hearts during their 2019-20 season. This campaign was ended with immediate effect on 13 April 2020 due to the COVID-19 pandemic, with Kelty Hearts being declared champions on a points per game average based on the current standings. During this break in footballing activities, Cenerazzo urged talks on league reconstruction, expressing concern that his side faced missing out on promotion despite their success across the season.

Cennerazzo announced his retirement on 12 July 2020.
