= Kintail Park =

Football ground in Lockerbie, Scotland

- Location within Dumfries and Galloway
- Location: Lockerbie, Scotland
- Coordinates: 55.1255°N 3.3602°W
- Surface: Grass

Construction
- Opened: 1902

Tenant
- Mid-Annandale

Kintail Park was a football ground in Lockerbie, Scotland. It was the home ground of Mid-Annandale, and hosted Scottish Football League matches between 1923 and 1926.

== History ==
Mid-Annandale moved to Kintail Park in 1902. The club were elected to the new Third Division of the Scottish Football League (SFL) in 1923, and a stand was erected on the southern side of the pitch in the same year. The first SFL match at Kintail Park was played on 25 August 1923, a 4–3 win over Helensburgh in front of 950 spectators.

The highest recorded league attendance at the ground during the club's time in the SFL was recorded on 9 November 1923 when 2,100 watched a 3–1 defeat by local rivals Queen of the South. At the end of the 1925–26 season the Third Division was disbanded, and Mid-Annandale's final home match in the SFL was played on 20 March 1926, a 1–1 draw with Brechin City.

The ground was eventually closed and the site used for a housing development. The road through the development is named Kintail Park.
