= Anton Hodge =

British writer (born 1969)

Anton Hodge (born 1969) is a British writer, born in Dunfermline, Scotland, but now living in North Yorkshire, England. He also helped to form Gretna FC 2008 from the ashes of the now defunct Gretna FC and became the club's first chairman in its inaugural year, an experience as detailed in his new book In Black and White: The Rise, Fall and Rebirth of Gretna Football. His first book, The Great Wall of Britain (2005) is a historical travelogue of Hadrian's Wall. This was followed in 2007 by The Border: A History in 10.5 Chapters.
