= Bill Ogilvie =

Scottish footballer and manager

Personal information
- Date of birth: 29 February 1932
- Place of birth: Kirriemuir, Scotland
- Date of death: 27 February 2011 (aged 78)
- Place of death: Turriff, Scotland
- Position: Centre-half

Youth career
- Forfar Celtic

Senior career*
Years	Team	Apps	(Gls)
1955–1960	Forfar Athletic	129	(19)
1960–1968	Montrose		

Managerial career
- 1968–1969: Montrose
- * Club domestic league appearances and goals

Bill Ogilvie (1932–2011) was a Scottish football player and manager.
