= Robbie Ivison =

English footballer

Personal information
- Date of birth: 5 September 2000 (age 26)
- Place of birth: Carlisle, England
- Position: Midfielder

Team information
- Current team: Gretna 2008

Youth career
- Carlisle United
- Queen of the South

Senior career*
Years	Team	Apps	(Gls)
2017–2019	Queen of the South	2	(0)
2019–2020	Tow Law Town		
2020–	Gretna 2008	10	(0)
- * Club domestic league appearances and goals as of 17:00, 4 July 2021 (UTC)

Robbie Ivison (born 5 September 2000) is an English professional footballer who plays for Gretna 2008, as a midfielder.

== Career ==
Ivison started his career with Carlisle United, moving onto Queen of the South in April 2017 at the age of sixteen.

Ivison signed with Gretna 2008 in July 2020 after spending a season at Tow Law Town.
