= Evison =

Evison is a surname. Notable people by that name include:

- Frank Evison (1922–2005), New Zealand geophysicist.
- Joey Evison (born 2001, English cricketer
- Jonathan Evison (born 1968), American writer.
- Pat Evison (1924–2010), New Zealand actress.
- Peter Evison (born 1964), English darts player.
- Ryan Evison (born 1987), New Zealand hydrologist.
