= Mid-Annandale F.C. =

Association football club in Scotland

Mid-Annandale
- Full name: Mid-Annandale Football Club
- Nickname: The Mids
- Founded: 1877 (original); 1959 (reformed)
- Ground: New King Edward Park, Lockerbie
- Capacity: 1,000
- Coordinates: 55°7′40″N 3°21′18″W
- Manager: Scott Martin
- League: South of Scotland League
- 2025–26: South of Scotland League, 8th of 11
| Home colours | Away colours |

Mid-Annandale Football Club, nicknamed Mids, are a football club from the town of Lockerbie in the Dumfries and Galloway area of Scotland. They play in the South of Scotland Football League.

== History ==
The history of organised football in Lockerbie goes back to 1877, with the formation of the original Mid-Annandale club, which folded in 1894. Over the next few years a number of unsuccessful attempts were made to establish a side in Lockerbie, but it was not until after the end of the First World War that a new Mid-Annandale team filled that void.

In 1921, the Mids joined the Southern Counties Football League and enjoyed rapid success. They won the title that season, and retained the trophy the following season. An invitation to join the new Third Division of the Scottish Football League was accepted in 1923, but this ill-fated expansion folded in 1926, leaving the Mids without a league home. Although they were eventually accepted into the Scottish Alliance League, the glory days were long gone. The club eventually quit their Kintail Park ground and used various school playing fields for the rest of their career. Despite a run of success in the Charity Cup during the early-30s, the club folded in 1936.

=== Modern club ===
The current club were formed in 1959 as Lockerbie Boys Club FC, and played in the Dumfries Amateur Football League until 2003, winning the title on one occasion in 1978 before joining the South of Scotland Football League. Their best finish in the league is runners-up in the 2017–18 season.

In July 2018, they appointed James Nichols as Manager. Nichols had been working in the Northern English league structure for Kendal Town but had caught Mid-Annandale's attention after he was appointed the first ever Manager of the Cascadian Football team.

In July 2024, Craig Fraser was appointed as Manager.

== Ground and colours ==
Mid-Annandale play their fixtures at New King Edward Park, which re-opened mid-way through the 2014–15 season. Prior to this, the club were sharing with Annan Athletic at their Galabank ground. During their time in the Scottish Football League they played at Kintail Park.

The team's strip colours are yellow and black.

As of January, 2025 Note: Flags indicate national team as defined under FIFA eligibility rules; some limited exceptions apply. Players may hold more than one non-FIFA nationality.

| No. | Pos. | Nation | Player |
|---|---|---|---|
| — | GK | SCO | Laurie Johnston |
| — | GK | SCO | Andro Mathewson |
| — | MF | SCO | Luke Hammond (Captain) |
| — | DF | SCO | Ben Robson |
| — | DF | SCO | Aaron Bell |
| — | MF | ENG | Harry Collins |
| — | DF | SCO | Cameron Dean |
| — | DF | SCO | Scott Norman |
| — | MF | SCO | Drew Jackson |
| — | FW | SCO | Benjamin Wagner |
| — | DF | SCO | Dylan Young |
| — | DF | SCO | Kyle Story |
| — | DF | SCO | Chris Newbould |
| — | MF | SCO | Mark Leesing |
| — | FW | SCO | Ronnie McMillan |

== Honours ==
=== Original club ===
- Scottish Qualifying Cup
  - Winners: 1926–27
  - Runners-up: 1922–23
- Southern Counties Football League
  - Champions 1921–22, 1922–23
- Southern Counties Cup
  - Winners 1928–29
- Southern Counties Charity Cup
  - Winners 1926–27, 1932–33, 1934–35, 1935–36

=== Modern club ===
- South of Scotland Football League
  - Runners-up: 2017–18
- Southern Counties FA Alba Cup
  - Winners: 2017–18, 2019–20
- Wigtownshire & District FA Cree Lodge Cup
  - Winners: 2018–19
- Dumfries & District Amateur Football League
  - Champions: 1977–78
