= Caledonian Braves F.C. =

Scottish semi-professional football club

Caledonian Braves
- Full name: Caledonian Braves Football Club
- Nickname: The Braves
- Founded: 2011, as Edusport Academy
- Ground: Alliance Park, Strathclyde Country Park, Motherwell
- Capacity: 500 (100 seated)
- Coordinates: 55.8004°N 4.0485°W
- Managing Director: Chris Ewing
- Head coach: Jamie McNee
- League: Lowland League West
- 2025–26: Lowland League, 5th of 18
- Website: caledonianbraves.com
Home colours	Away colours

Caledonian Braves Football Club is a Scottish semi-professional football club based in Motherwell, North Lanarkshire. They are members of the Lowland League West, in the fifth tier of the Scottish football league system.

The club originated from Edusport Academy, a residential youth academy for French footballers founded in 2011 and initially based at the Ravenscraig Regional Sports Facility in Motherwell, North Lanarkshire, before relocating to Lesser Hampden in Glasgow in 2015. A second centre based in Edinburgh opened in 2014. From the 2014–15 season onwards, they fielded a team under the Edusport Academy name in Scottish senior football, the only private academy to do so in a recognised senior league. They initially played in the South of Scotland League before winning promotion to the Lowland League in 2017. As Edusport, the senior team played at the Hamilton Palace Sports Ground in Hamilton, South Lanarkshire (2014–2015) and Galabank in Annan, Dumfries and Galloway (2015–2019).

From 2018 onwards, the senior team began to operate separately from the academy after launching a membership scheme, Our Football Club. In 2019 they were rebranded as Caledonian Braves and moved to Alliance Park, formerly known as Bothwellhaugh, within Strathclyde Country Park in North Lanarkshire.

== History ==
=== Academy ===
The Edusport Academy was founded in 2011 by Chris Ewing with the aim of helping talented young French footballers to develop their skills in football and the English language, and gain opportunities with British professional clubs. Initially, the main training venues were the Ravenscraig Regional Sports Facility in Motherwell, North Lanarkshire, and the Hamilton Palace Sports Ground in Hamilton, South Lanarkshire, with English classes taking place at New College Lanarkshire. Edusport expanded in 2014, opening an Edinburgh centre with training at Ainslie Park and education at Edinburgh College. In 2015, they decided to relocate from Motherwell to a new Glasgow base; the academy now trains at Lesser Hampden with educational classes at City of Glasgow College.

Four women were added to the Edusport Academy programme in 2015. They are based at the Edinburgh centre and will gain senior experience through a partnership with Spartans of the Scottish Women's Premier League.

=== Senior football ===
In June 2014, Edusport Academy successfully applied for membership of the semi-professional South of Scotland League in the sixth tier of the Scottish football league system, becoming the first private football academy in the world to operate a team in a FIFA-recognised senior league. They made further Scottish football history in a league match against Creetown in September 2014, when they first fielded a team composed entirely of French nationals. The senior team won two trophies in their first season, the South of Scotland League Cup and the Cree Lodge Cup. They applied to move up a level to the Lowland League in 2015, but their application was rejected.

Edusport Academy won the 2016–17 South of Scotland League title to gain promotion to the Lowland League, the fifth tier of Scottish football. In February 2018, Ewing announced plans to separate the senior team from the academy and attract a fanbase by launching a new online membership scheme, Our Football Club. Members will have voting and decision-making powers, including a say on choosing a new name, crest and colours for the team. They will be able to recommend potential signings, but will have no say on team selection. Ewing stated at the launch of the project that his aim was to reach the Scottish Premiership by 2025.

At the start of the 2019–20 season Edusport Academy rebranded the club as the Caledonian Braves following a vote online by members of the Our Football Club.com project. In the first few seasons as a senior club, the Braves found moderate success in the Lowland League, finishing between 8th and 12th place from the curtailed 2019–20 season up until the 2022–23 season.

Despite mid-table finishes, the team twice held the record for biggest home wins in the league, defeating Vale of Leithen 9–0 in the 2020–21 season, and defeating Dalbeattie Star 10–0 in the 2022–23 season.

The club won the Southern Counties Challenge Cup in 2023, defeating Dalbeattie Star 3–1 in the final held at Galabank. They reached the final the previous year but were defeated 3–2 by the same opposition.

The Braves also proved to be a force in the South Challenge Cup, reaching the Round of 16 of the 2021-22 competition, where they were defeated 3–1 by eventual champions Auchinleck Talbot, and reaching the semi-finals in 2022–23, losing 2–1 to eventual champions The Spartans.

== Stadium ==
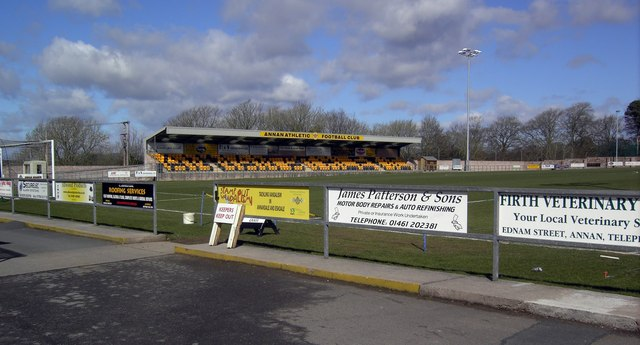
Galabank, where Edusport Academy played their home fixtures from 2015 to 2019

For the first season, South of Scotland League home matches were played at the Hamilton Palace Sports Ground in Hamilton, South Lanarkshire. From 2015 onwards, the team groundshared with Annan Athletic at their Galabank stadium in Annan, Dumfries and Galloway. From the start of the 2019–20 Lowland League season, the team play at Alliance Park Bothwellhaugh in Strathclyde Country Park near Motherwell, North Lanarkshire. The name of the ground, which was voted for by more than 90% of Our Football Club members, was chosen to reflect the unity between the French and Scottish elements of the club.

== Current squad ==
=== First-team squad ===
As of 13 July 2026

Note: Flags indicate national team as defined under FIFA eligibility rules; some limited exceptions apply. Players may hold more than one non-FIFA nationality.

No.	Pos.	Nation	Player
1	GK	SCO	Ross Connolly
2	DF	SCO	Ross Lyon
3	DF	SCO	Robbie Stewart
4	DF	SCO	Greig Stewart
5	DF	SVK	Erik Šuľa
6	MF	SCO	John Guthrie (team captain)
9	FW	SCO	Ross McNeil (club captain)
10	MF	SCO	Connor McLaren
11	MF	SCO	Dean Watson

No.	Pos.	Nation	Player
14	FW	SCO	James Graham
17	FW	SCO	Reg McLaren
18	FW	SCO	Aiden Malcolm
19	FW	SCO	Oliver Gordon
22	MF	SCO	Reece Mullen
23	MF	SCO	Lewis Hunter
25	GK	SCO	David Hutton
27	FW	SCO	Cammy Cooper

=== Out on loan ===
Note: Flags indicate national team as defined under FIFA eligibility rules; some limited exceptions apply. Players may hold more than one non-FIFA nationality.

No.	Pos.	Nation	Player
—	DF	SCO	Ben Nelson (at Dalbeattie Star until 30 June 2027)

== Club Staff ==
As of 8 May 2026

Position	Name
Managing Director	Chris Ewing
Head Coach	Jamie McNee
Assistant Manager	Michael Paton
First Team Coach	Cole Starrs
Goalkeeping Coach	Ross Paterson
Head Physio	Leanne Glately
Kit Manager	Ross Gillespie

== Season-by-season records ==
Season	Division	Tier	League							Scottish Cup
Season	Division	Tier	Pos	M	W	D	L	GD	Pts	Scottish Cup
Edusport Academy
2014–15	South of Scotland League	6	5th	26	15	2	9	+42	47	Did not compete
2015–16	South of Scotland League	6	2nd	26	20	3	3	+74	63	Did not compete
2016–17	South of Scotland League	6	1st	26	22	2	2	+60	68	Preliminary Round 1
2017–18	Lowland League	5	10th	30	9	7	14	-3	34	2nd Round
2018–19	Lowland League	5	9th	28	9	6	13	-9	33	2nd Round
Caledonian Braves
2019–20	Lowland League	5	8th†	26	11	3	12	+2	36	1st Round
2020–21	Lowland League	5	12th†	14	4	1	9	-6	13	1st Round
2021–22	Lowland League	5	9th	34	15	8	11	+19	53	1st Round
2022–23	Lowland League	5	10th	36	15	6	15	+12	51	2nd Round
2023–24	Lowland League	5	12th	34	12	9	13	+4	45	1st Round
2024–25	Lowland League	5	3rd	34	18	9	7	+26	63	2nd Round
2025–26	Lowland League	5	5th	34	18	5	11	+27	59	2nd Round

† Season curtailed due to coronavirus pandemic

== Honours ==
- FENIX Trophy
  - Winners: 2024–25
- Southern Counties Challenge Cup
  - Winners: 2022–23, 2023–24
  - Finalists: 2021–22
- South of Scotland League
  - Winners: 2016–17
- South of Scotland League Cup
  - Winners (2): 2014–15, 2015–16
- Cree Lodge Cup
  - Winners: 2014–15
- Haig Gordon Cup
  - Winners: 2018–19
- Tweedie Cup
  - Winners: 2015–16

== Affiliated club(s) ==
- (India) Travancore Royals FC (2021– )
- (Malta) Sweiqi Braves
