= Galabank =

Football stadium in Annan, Scotland

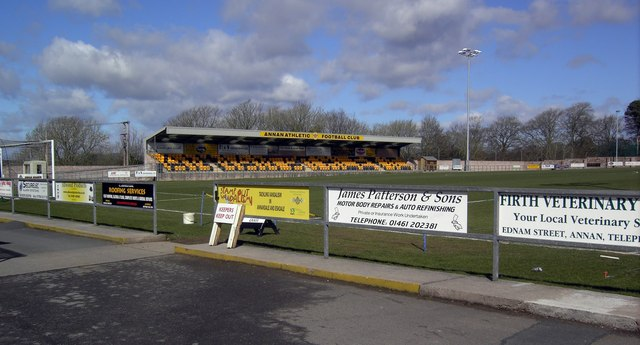
- Galabank's main stand

- Location in Dumfries and Galloway
- Location: 82 North St; Annan; Dumfries and Galloway; DG12 5DQ
- Coordinates: 54°59′38″N 3°15′42″W
- Capacity: 2,504 (500 seated)
- Record attendance: 2,517

Tenants
- Annan Athletic F.C. (1953–Present); Mid-Annandale F.C. (2012–2014); Edusport Academy (2015–2019)

Galabank is a football stadium in the town of Annan, Dumfries and Galloway, Scotland. It is the home ground of Scottish Professional Football League club Annan Athletic, who have played there since 1953. The ground has been shared by non-League teams Mid-Annandale (2012–2014) and Edusport Academy (2015–2019).

== History ==
Annan Athletic, who were then playing in the Carlisle and District League, moved to Galabank in 1953. They had previously been based at Mafeking Park since the 1946–47 season. The club rejoined Scottish football in 1977, playing in the South of Scotland League and later the East of Scotland League. This enabled the club to attempt to qualify for the Scottish Cup, and Galabank hosted its first match in the national competition against Stranraer on 15 December 1979.

On 3 July 2008 Annan Athletic were accepted into the Scottish Football League for the first time, to replace defunct club Gretna. Consequently, Galabank began hosting Annan's games in the Scottish Football League Third Division in the 2008–09 season.

A party from the SFL inspected Galabank before Annan were accepted into the league. They deemed it to be of the required standard, with the provision that Annan install floodlights, which the club did before the start of their first season in the lowest tier of the Scottish Football League. Galabank has a capacity of 2,504.

The grass pitch was removed and a new 3G artificial surface was installed for the 2012–13 season. Between 2012 and 2014, Galabank was shared by South of Scotland League club Mid-Annandale, whose previous ground in Lockerbie had become unusable. Edusport Academy, playing in the South League and latterly the Lowland League, shared the ground from 2015 until opening their own Alliance Park ground within Strathclyde Country Park in 2019.

== Records ==
The highest ever official attendance to watch a match at Galabank was 2,517, set in a goalless draw between Annan Athletic and Rangers on 15 September 2012.
