= Gretna F.C. 2008 =

Gretna 2008
- Full name: Gretna Football Club 2008
- Nicknames: Black and Whites; Anvils
- Founded: 2 July 2008; 18 years ago
- Ground: Raydale Park, Gretna
- Capacity: 1,030 (138 seated)
- Coordinates: 54.993456°N 3.072448°W
- Chairman: Stuart Holmes
- Manager: Vinnie Parker
- League: Lowland League West
- 2025–26: Lowland League, 17th of 18
- Website: gretnafc2008.co.uk
Home colours	Away colours

Gretna Football Club 2008 (commonly referred to as Gretna 2008 and colloquially as Gretna) is a football club from the town of Gretna and currently compete in the Lowland League West. It is the phoenix club of Gretna F.C., and was founded in 2008 after the bankruptcy and demise of Gretna, which had existed since 1946. Gretna 2008 is not a direct continuation of the old club, being under a completely different management and set-up; the club trades under the name Gretna FC 2008 Ltd to avoid confusion with the old Gretna.

In 2013, the club became founder members of the Lowland League, having previously played in the East of Scotland Football League Premier Division. The team played for most of the 2008–09 season at the Everholm Stadium in Annan. Late in the season, however, the new owners of Raydale Park allowed Gretna 2008 to move to the ground in their home town. In May 2011, the Raydale Community Partnership, of which Gretna FC 2008 is a member, negotiated the purchase of the site.

In 2024, the Club launched a Ladies team which plays in the SWFL South League.

== History ==
The original Gretna Football Club was founded in 1946, and joined the Scottish Football League in 2002. After being taken over by the late millionaire Brooks Mileson, the club had a meteoric rise, gaining promotion three consecutive seasons to make the Scottish Premier League in 2007. However, the club could not financially support itself and following Mileson's illness and withdrawal of financial support, the club slipped into administration and then bankruptcy in the summer of 2008. The club were relegated from the SPL and then forced to resign their place in the Scottish Football League.

With Gretna heading out of business, on 2 July 2008, the Gretna Supporters' Society, a supporters' trust, founded "a new Gretna Football Club", and appointed Anton Hodge as chairman. In August 2009, the trust amended its articles of governance and Gretna FC 2008 is now managed directly by the members of the trust board, whose chairman is Stuart Holmes. The new club is wholly owned by the society and its board elected by the society's members. The club appointed the University of Cumbria's football officer Stuart Rome as team manager and recruited much of the playing squad from Workington's reserve team. Technically, Gretna 2008 coexisted briefly with the old Gretna, which was not formally liquidated until 8 August 2008.

Unable to play at the old Gretna's home ground of Raydale Park, they instead moved into the Everholm Stadium in Annan. Gretna 2008 played their first match against Workington on 12 July 2008. Four days later, they were successfully accepted into the East of Scotland Football League First Division, and on 9 August 2008, won their first competitive match as a new club, beating Kelso United 3–0 away in their first match of the league season. The new owners of Raydale Park allowed Gretna 2008 to move to the ground in their home town in May 2009, and the Raydale Community Partnership, of which Gretna FC 2008 is a member, negotiated the purchase of the site in May 2011. They finished their first season as a new club in fourth place in the league. They narrowly averted promotion again in their second season, but finished their third, in 2010–11 being promoted as First Division champions.

In 2013, Gretna FC 2008 were elected founder members of the new Lowland Football League.

== Colours and badge ==
Gretna 2008's colours are black and grey with white dashes. Gretna F.C. had used white shirts after Brooks Mileson took control of the club, but black and white hoops were the club's traditional colours.

The badge of the club is largely similar to that of Gretna, except that 2008 has been added to reflect the change of status in that year. The anvil represents the famous Blacksmith's Shop wedding site at Gretna Green, and the thistles represent the club's Scottish location.

== Current squad ==
As of 20 July 2026

Note: Flags indicate national team as defined under FIFA eligibility rules; some limited exceptions apply. Players may hold more than one non-FIFA nationality.

No.	Pos.	Nation	Player
—	GK	SCO	Archie Aitchison (on loan from Queens Park)
—	GK	SCO	Jim Atkinson (captain)
—	GK	ENG	Harry Cross
—	DF	SCO	Sam Atkinson
—	DF	SCO	Stuart Douglas
—	DF	ENG	Hayden Tait
—	DF	SCO	Lewis Currie
—	DF	SCO	Luke McMurtrie
—	DF	ENG	Steven Swinglehurst
—	DF	ENG	Trent Chapman
—	DF	SCO	Callum Hill
—	MF	SCO	Dylan McGeouch
—	MF	SCO	Finlay Kennedy

No.	Pos.	Nation	Player
—	MF	ENG	Lewis Bell
—	MF	ENG	Bobby Skinner
—	MF	ENG	Robbie Ivison
—	MF	SCO	Matt Hall
—	MF	SCO	Andrew Oram
—	MF	SCO	Kyan Gunn
—	MF	SCO	Liam Short
—	MF	SCO	Josh Galloway
—	FW	SCO	Dean Brotherston
—	FW	ENG	Harry McLinden
—	FW	SCO	Iain Anderson
—	FW	ENG	Romeo Park

== Management ==
Position	Name
Manager	Vinnie Parker
Assistant manager	Kevin Somerville
Coach	Neil Murray
Youth Coach (U20s)	Kyle Holt
Ladies Manager	Shaun Harrison

== Seasons ==
Year	League	Level	P	W	D	L	F	A	GD	Pts	Position	Scottish Cup
2008–09	East of Scotland First Division		22	13	5	4	50	22	+28	44	4th of 12	DNP
2009–10	East of Scotland First Division		22	13	4	5	53	20	+33	43	4th of 12	DNP
2010–11	East of Scotland First Division		22	19	1	2	85	18	+67	58	1st of 12; Promoted as champions	DNP
2011–12	East of Scotland Premier Division		22	9	6	7	40	46	−6	33	6th of 12	DNP
2012–13	East of Scotland Premier Division		22	9	7	6	34	25	+9	34	4th of 12; Transferred to Lowland League	DNP
2013–14	Lowland Football League	5	22	8	7	7	40	33	+7	31	7th of 12	DNP
2014–15	Lowland Football League	5	26	13	6	7	62	32	+30	45	3rd of 14	2R
2015–16	Lowland Football League	5	28	11	3	14	38	50	−12	36	10th of 15	1R
2016–17	Lowland Football League	5	30	12	4	14	44	65	−21	40	9th of 16	2R
2017–18	Lowland Football League	5	30	12	4	14	50	56	−6	40	8th of 16	1R
2018–19	Lowland Football League	5	28	9	2	17	42	67	−25	29	12th of 15	2R
2019–20	Lowland Football League	5	24	2	6	16	21	62	−41	12	13th of 16†	2R
2020–21	Lowland Football League	5	11	3	1	7	15	25	−10	10	13th of 17†	DNP
2021–22	Lowland Football League	5	34	2	5	27	36	109	−73	11	17th of 18	1R
2022–23	Lowland Football League	5	36	8	2	26	39	91	−52	26	17th of 19	2R
2023–24	Lowland Football League	5	34	3	3	28	26	114	−88	12	17th of 18	1R

† Season curtailed due to coronavirus pandemic.

== Honours ==
- East of Scotland Football League First Division
  - Winners: 2010–11
- East of Scotland City Cup:
  - Winners: 2012–13
- East of Scotland Qualifying Cup
  - Winners (2): 2009–10, 2012–13
- Alex Jack Cup
  - Winners: 2008–09
- Lowland League Cup
  - Runners-Up (2): 2014–15, 2015–16
- Southern Counties FA Challenge Cup
  - Winners: 2024-25
