= Threave Rovers F.C. =

Association football club in Scotland

Threave Rovers
- Full name: Threave Rovers Football Club
- Nickname: The Rovers
- Founded: 1953
- Ground: Meadow Park, Castle Douglas
- Capacity: 1,671
- Coordinates: 54°56′18″N 3°56′16″W
- Chairman: David McVitie
- Manager: Danny Dunglinson
- League: West of Scotland League First Division
- 2025–26: West of Scotland League Second Division, 2nd of 16 (promoted)
- Website: threaverovers.co.uk
Home colours	Away colours

Threave Rovers Football Club are a football club from Castle Douglas in Dumfries and Galloway, Scotland. Formed in October 1953, the club plays its home games at Meadow Park and plays in the West of Scotland League First Division. They were previously members of the South of Scotland League for most of their history, until transferring to the West of Scotland League in 2022.

== History ==
Threave spent their early years engaged in friendlies and local cup competitions until they became a senior club in 1959 and replaced Whithorn in the South of Scotland Football League. They played for many years in the South of Scotland League, winning the championship seven times, before moving to the East of Scotland Football League in 1998–99, (while simultaneously running a reserve team in the South of Scotland League).

They performed well in the more difficult East of Scotland League, finishing third in the 2003–04 season, before quitting that league and deciding to concentrate their full efforts on the South of Scotland League. They cited the financial burden of constantly travelling eastwards to games as the reason for this decision. However, despite it being generally held that the South of Scotland League is the poorer of the two competitions, they only finished fourth in their first season back in the South, despite having finished third the season before in the East. This was primarily down to losing their top players, who did not want to play at a lesser level of football, to Annan Athletic and Dalbeattie Star.

In the 2007–08 Scottish Cup, they produced one of the biggest shocks when the club defeated Third Division side Stenhousemuir 1–0 in the second round. Their reward was a home tie with Raith Rovers in the third round, but Threave lost the game 0–5.

Threave won the league in the 2008–09 season. The 2009–10 season proved to be another successful one for Threave, who retained the league title, losing only one match all season.

On Saturday 23 October 2010, Threave progressed to the third round of the Scottish Cup with a 4–2 win against Edinburgh City at Meadowbank Stadium. The third round draw saw Rovers once again pitted against old foes Stenhousemuir, and despite leading 2–0 at Ochilview Park, they were pegged back to 2–2 at the final whistle. Threave subsequently lost the replay 1–5 at Meadow Park on Wednesday 12 January 2011 (originally scheduled for Saturday 27 November 2010, the third round replay was delayed for over six weeks following 15 weather-related postponements). Tragedy struck the club through the game being postponed so many times.

The 2010–11 season proved as successful as the last two when Rovers defeated rivals Dalbeattie Star in front of 350 spectators at Islecroft in the penultimate game of the season to complete a hat-trick of league wins. The Castle Douglas side also lifted the Potts Cup after winning a penalty shoot-out 3–0 against Crichton at Hospital Park, they also won the Cree Lodge Cup after beating St Cuthbert Wanderers 5–1 in the final.

As an early adopter of the SFA club licensing system, Threave were invited to become inaugural members of the Lowland Football League in 2013. Rovers found it difficult to compete at this level, finishing second bottom in their first season, then bottom in the two subsequent years. At the end of the 2015–16 season, the club declined the opportunity to re-apply for membership of the Lowland League and rejoined the South of Scotland Football League. The club gained their 13th league title and won two cups in the 2017–18 season.

The team were managed since September 2018 by former player and team captain, Sam Warren.

Warren left his position in March 2020 due to personal commitments and was replaced by former Rovers player, Vinnie Parker.

Threave transferred to the West of Scotland Football League for season 2022–23. They were placed in Fourth Division, the lowest division of the league (and the only level 10 in the Scottish football league system). They won promotion to the Third Division at the first attempt.

== Honours ==
=== League ===
- South of Scotland Football League
  - Winners (13) : 1964–65, 1968–69, 1971–72, 1978–79, 1992–93, 1993–94, 1994–95, 2005–06, 2006–07, 2008–09, 2009–10, 2010–11, 2017–18

=== Cup ===
- Southern Counties Cup/ Challenge Cup
  - Winners (6) : 1964–65, 1979–80, 1980–81, 1985–86, 1997–98, 2007–08
- South of Scotland League Cup
  - Winners (6) : 1971–72, 1980–81, 1987–88, 1989–90, 1990–91, 1993–94,
- Potts Cup
  - Winners (8) : 1962–63, 1965–66, 1967–68, 1980–81, 1990–91, 1993–94, 1994–95, 2010–11
- Cree Lodge Cup
  - Winners (5) : 1960–61, 1992–93, 2010–11, 2011–12, 2017–18
- Tweedie Cup
  - Winners (7) : 1963–64, 1968–69, 1981–82, 1985–86, 1987–88, 1996–97, 2011–12
- Haig Gordon Memorial Trophy
  - Winners (7) : 1966–67, 1968–69, 1973–74, 1980–81, 1981–82, 1989–90, 2017–18
- Detroit Trophy – Overall Championship
  - Winners (13) : 1964–65, 1968–69, 1980–81, 1981–82, 1985–86, 1987–88, 1989–90, 1993–94, 1994–95, 2005–06, 2008–09, 2010–11, 2017–18

== Notable former players ==
- George Cloy
