= Airdrieonians F.C. =

Association football club in Airdrie, Scotland

Airdrieonians
- Full name: Airdrieonians Football Club
- Nickname: The Diamonds
- Founded: 2002; 24 years ago (as Airdrie United FC)
- Ground: Excelsior Stadium, Airdrie
- Capacity: 10,101
- Coordinates: 55°51′36″N 3°57′36″W
- Chairman: Paul Hetherington
- Head coach: John Rankin
- League: Scottish League One
- 2025–26: Scottish Championship, 9th of 10 (relegated)
- Website: www.airdriefc.com
| Home colours | Away colours | Third colours |

Airdrieonians Football Club, commonly known as Airdrie, is a Scottish professional football team in Airdrie, North Lanarkshire, who compete in Scottish League One as members of the Scottish Professional Football League, following their relegation from the Scottish Championship in the 2025–26 season. They were formed in 2002 as Airdrie United Football Club following the folding of the original Airdrieonians, before returning to its traditional name on 1 June 2013.

The club have won three trophies in their short history – the Scottish Second Division in 2003–04 and the Challenge Cup in 2008–09 and 2023–24. Once described as "the luckiest team in the Scottish League", the club have benefited in league division placements due to other club's misfortunes on four occasions (2008, 2009, 2012 and 2025). However the club have lost six Scottish league play-off finals (2007, 2008, 2009, 2012, 2021 and 2022), three semi-finals (2010, 2017 and 2026) and one quarter-final (2024) in total, eventually offset by two Championship play-off final victories, in 2023 against Hamilton Academical and 2025 against Cove Rangers.

== History ==
=== Formation as Airdrie United ===
The club was formed in 2002 as Airdrie United, following the bankruptcy of the original Airdrieonians.

Airdrieonians had finished runners-up in the Scottish First Division in the 2001–02 season but went out of business with debts approaching £3 million. The collapse of "The Diamonds", as they were known due to their distinctive kits, created a vacancy in the Scottish Football League (in the Scottish Third Division). Accountant and Airdrieonians fan Jim Ballantyne attempted, with the help of others, to gain entry with a club called "Airdrie United" who were essentially to be a reincarnation of Airdrieonians. Their application however was rejected as the then English Northern Premier League side Gretna were preferred by league members over the new Airdrie United.

Airdrie United then went on to complete a buy-out of the ailing Second Division side Clydebank and with SFL approval the club was relocated to Airdrie, the strips were transformed to resemble that of Airdrieonians, and the name was changed to Airdrie United. While this means that the club is therefore officially a legal continuation of Clydebank, it is almost universally accepted as a reincarnation of Airdrieonians, with a new version of Clydebank being reformed by supporters' groups and entering into the West Region Junior League.

=== Early years: league title with Sandy Stewart (2002–2006) ===
Managed by Sandy Stewart, Airdrie United's first match took place at New Broomfield against Forfar Athletic in August 2002, with captain Stephen Docherty scoring the only goal of the game with Airdrie United winning 1–0. Their debut season saw the club only narrowly fail to achieve promotion by one point due to a late injury-time goal from Brechin City which saw them promoted instead. The club reached the second round of the Challenge Cup, the third round of the Scottish Cup and the third round of the Scottish League Cup having beaten Premier League side Kilmarnock in the second round.

During the rest of Stewart's tenure the club reached the final of the Challenge Cup in 2003 (losing 2–0 to Inverness Caledonian Thistle), and won the Second Division title in 2003–04 season. Having started poorly Airdrie went on a run that saw them unbeaten in the last 18 games of that season, including the final game of the league campaign which saw a crowd of over 5,700 at New Broomfield to watch Airdrie defeat Morton 2–0 and lift the League Championship trophy, the club having been confirmed champions the previous week following their 1–0 victory away to Alloa Athletic at Recreation Park.

In November 2006, Stewart was sacked and replaced by former Airdrieonians player and Airdrie United coach Kenny Black, his first management post.

=== Mixed fortunes: - play-offs, cup win and promotion (2006–2013) ===
Under Kenny Black the club suffered four successive play-off defeats:

- In the 2006–07 season as relegation play-off finalists (losing 5–4 on aggregate to Stirling Albion).
- In the 2007–08 season as promotion play-off finalists (losing 3–0 on aggregate to Clyde). However the enforced relegation of Gretna to the Third Division, after being put into administration, prompted a restructuring of the leagues, and Airdrie were promoted to the First Division as the losing play-off finalists.
- In the 2008–09 season as relegation play-off finalists (losing 3–2 on aggregate to Second Division runners up Ayr United). Again Airdrie were given a reprieve as the continued uncertainty over the future of Livingston meant that the West Lothian club were relegated to the Third division, so Airdrie were reinstated to the First Division as losing play-off finalists.
- In the 2009–10 season as relegation play-off semi-finalists (losing 3–1 on aggregate to Brechin City). Unlike the previous two seasons there was no reprieve.

The club won the Challenge Cup in 2008, defeating Ross County 3–2 on penalties after a 2–2 draw, and despite another play-off defeat by 6–2 on aggregate to Dumbarton in the promotion play-off final at the end of 2011–12 season Airdrie were lucky again as the liquidation of the company that operated Scottish Premier League side Rangers and the decision by Scottish Football League clubs that Rangers should play in the Scottish Third Division, meant that an additional team from each tier of Scottish football was promoted for the 2012–13 season. As Airdrie were runners up in the previous season's Second Division promotion play-offs, they were promoted to the Scottish First Division. A season in the First Division came to an end in May 2013, with the club finishing bottom of the league and relegated to Division Two.

=== Airdrieonians name returns (2013–2015) ===
In June 2013, the club officially changed its name from Airdrie United Football Club to Airdrieonians Football Club. The name change revived the name of the club it was formed to replace in 2002, following the liquidation of the original Airdrieonians. The Airdrieonians all red club crest was also revived, with an alternate black and red version used for the away kits.

=== New ownership at the club (2015–2018) ===
In June 2015 Jim Ballantyne sold control of the club to Tom Wotherspoon, a Lanarkshire businessman and owner of M & H Logistics (who had previously sponsored Hamilton Academical, East Fife and BSC Glasgow). Wotherspoon became chairman and Ballantyne vice-chairman, appointing former Scottish Sun newspaper Head of Sport Iain King as Chief Executive (King left the club in June 2016).

Despite retaining his majority shareholding Tom Wotherspoon resigned as chairman and director of Airdrieonians on 5 June 2017, with former chairman Jim Ballantyne taking Wotherspoon's place as chairman.

=== Takeover and Ian Murray (2018–2022) ===
In January 2018, it was announced that a consortium of various businessmen (including former Airdrieonians manager Bobby Watson) had taken control of Tom Wotherspoon's controlling shares, bringing to an end a tumultuous period for the club. The majority of the previous board was replaced, including Jim Ballantyne, and subsequently Director of Football Gordon Dalziel (appointed October 2016) departed and was replaced by former player Stuart Millar.

Manager Ian Murray led the club to fifth, third and two second place Scottish League One finishes in 2019, 2020, 2021 and 2022 respectively, with the club missing out on play-off games (due to the COVID-19 pandemic) in 2020, losing to Championship side Morton over a two-legged play-off final in May 2021, and losing to Scottish League One side Queen's Park over a two-legged play-off final in May 2022. After this defeat Murray departed the club for Raith Rovers in the Scottish Championship.

=== The Rhys McCabe years (2022–2025) ===
With Rhys McCabe subsequently appointed as player manager, Airdrie finished the 2022–23 season in third place, defeating Falkirk 7–2 on aggregate in the play-off semi-final and Hamilton Academical 6–5 on penalties after extra time in the Championship play-off final at New Douglas Park in May 2023, therefore relegating Hamilton to League One and earning Airdrie a place in the Scottish Championship.

At the beginning of the 2023–24 season, McCabe guided the side to a clean sweep of their group in the Scottish League Cup, gaining 12 points, including defeating top-flight Dundee 1–0, then losing 4–3 after extra time against Premiership side Ross County in the next round. Following a defeat of Premiership side St. Johnstone, Airdrie reached the fifth round of the Scottish Cup for the first time in over 10 years, but lost to Hearts 4–1.

In March 2024, Airdrie reached the final of the Scottish Challenge Cup, and defeated Welsh side The New Saints at Falkirk Stadium 2–1 through goals from Liam McStravick and Nikolay Todorov to lift the trophy for the first time since 2008.

The club finished the league in fourth place and earned a play-off spot. However an aggregate defeat to Partick Thistle over two quarter-final ties saw the club remain in the Championship for another season.

At the end of season 2024–25 fellow Championship club Hamilton Accies were deducted 15 points by the SPFL and dropped to the bottom of the table, leading to them being relegated. The decision meant Airdrie escaped automatic relegation and entered the Championship relegation play-offs. A (two legged) semi-final win over Stenhousemuir saw Airdrie then face Cove Rangers in the play-off final, defeating them 2–1 on aggregate over two legs and thus retaining their Championship status for season 2025–26.

=== Management changes and relegation (2025–present) ===
Rhys McCabe left the club on 15 August 2025, with former acting manager Danny Lennon appointed his successor on 27 August 2025. However, Lennon departed the club after two months, with Aaron Taylor-Sinclair appointed as permanent head coach in January 2026. Under Taylor-Sinclair, Airdrie were relegated to League One after three years in the Scottish Championship, losing to Alloa Athletic 3-1 on aggregate in the playoff semi-final. Taylor-Sinclair left the club in May 2026, with John Rankin subsequently appointed as the new head coach.

== Stadium ==
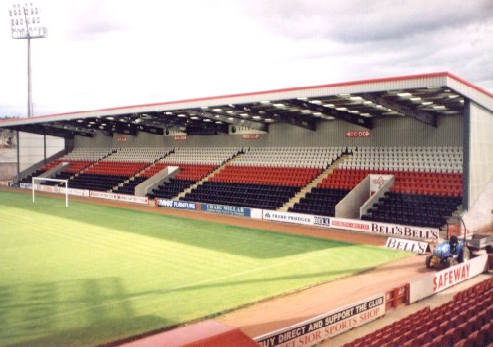
Excelsior Stadium, home of Airdrieonians

Airdrie play their home fixtures at Excelsior Stadium, also unofficially known as New Broomfield. For sponsorship reasons the venue was originally known as The Shyberry Excelsior Stadium (after Shyberry Design Ltd. who had sponsored the construction), from 2018 to 2022 as The Penny Cars Stadium and from 2024 onwards as The Albert Bartlett Stadium.

The ground was built when now defunct Airdrieonians' previous home, Broomfield Park, was sold to supermarket chain Safeway, who were given permission to build a new store on the site. This transaction has been cited as being the cause of the financial ruination of the club, as their old ground was demolished several years before they acquired planning permission for the new stadium. In the intervening years the club ground-shared Broadwood Stadium, in Cumbernauld, the home of Clyde.

Excelsior Stadium has an all-seated capacity of 10,101. At the end of the 2009–10 season a new 3G artificial surface was installed. This was replaced at the end of the 2021–22 season. The main pitch and adjoining small-sided facilities are all made available for local community use.

In 2003 a ground share was proposed with Falkirk as their ground did not meet SPL requirements; this was later refused as Falkirk could not prove the SPL fixtures would have priority. Queen of the South played their Uefa Cup tie in 2008 at the stadium, as did Motherwell in 2009. Queen's Park utilised the stadium for their "home" games from December 2013 until May 2014, due to the redevelopment of Hampden Park for the 2014 Commonwealth Games.

When the stadium originally opened the Main/West Stand was named the Jack Dalziel Stand in memory of the former Airdrieonians Chairman, and in May 2025 the club announced that the East Stand would be permanently renamed the Ian McMillan Stand in honour of the Airdrieonians player and manager.

== Colours and crest ==
=== Colours ===
Airdrie United inherited Airdrieonians' distinctive playing colours of a white shirt with a red diamond. The design was the basis of Airdrieonians' nickname, The Diamonds, which has also been adopted by Airdrie.

=== Crest ===
The club badge of AFC, used for 26 years by the old club and three by the revival, was declared illegal in 2015.

When Airdrie United were formed, they used a blue double-headed eagle device on a white shield for their badge, with a red scroll below the shield that read "Airdrie United F.C.", amended to bearing "Airdrie F.C." when the club rebranded in 2012. The eagle recalled the Airdrie town arms.

When the club inherited the Airdrieonians name in 2013, they also restored the badge worn by their predecessors: the original AFC bore this emblem from 1974 until their demise in 2002, excepting the 2000–01 season. This badge featured a cockerel sitting atop a shield containing two lions passant and the club's initials. The club were informed by the Lord Lyon King of Arms in March 2015 that as their badge features a shield, it constitutes a heraldic device, and heraldic devices are not permitted to carry lettering. On 19 June 2015, Airdrieonians unveiled a new crest, removing the shield and instead using a chevron–representing the "Airdrie Diamond"–to separate the scroll from the remainder of the badge.

== Current squad ==
As of 1 October 2026

Note: Flags indicate national team as defined under FIFA eligibility rules; some limited exceptions apply. Players may hold more than one non-FIFA nationality.

| No. | Pos. | Nation | Player |
|---|---|---|---|
| 1 | GK | SCO | Jamie Sneddon |
| 2 | DF | SCO | Dylan MacDonald |
| 3 | DF | SCO | Evan Easton |
| 4 | DF | SCO | Craig Ross (vice-captain) |
| 5 | DF | SCO | Sam Fisher |
| 6 | MF | SCO | Ewan Simpson |
| 7 | FW | IRL | Robbie Mahon |
| 8 | MF | SCO | Gavin Gallagher |
| 9 | FW | SCO | Dapo Mebude |
| 10 | FW | SCO | Matty Yates |
| 11 | MF | ENG | AJ Bridge |
| 12 | DF | ENG | Kwame Boateng |
| 14 | DF | SCO | Adam Devine |
| 15 | MF | SCO | Cole McKinnon (captain) |

| No. | Pos. | Nation | Player |
|---|---|---|---|
| 16 | MF | SCO | Connor Smith |
| 17 | DF | ENG | Henry James |
| 18 | FW | SCO | Liam McLeish |
| 19 | MF | SCO | Zac Butterworth |
| 20 | GK | SCO | Cade Melrose |
| 21 | GK | SCO | Ruairidh Adams (on loan from Dundee United) |
| 22 | MF | NIR | Callum Burnside (on loan from Rangers) |
| 24 | DF | SCO | Reghan Tumilty |
| 25 | FW | WAL | Josh Gentles (on loan from Rangers) |
| 27 | FW | SCO | Lewis Gibson |
| 28 | FW | SCO | Tom Pickford |
| 31 | DF | SCO | Declan Gallagher |
| 33 | MF | ENG | Kian Taylor |

=== On loan ===
Note: Flags indicate national team as defined under FIFA eligibility rules; some limited exceptions apply. Players may hold more than one non-FIFA nationality.

| No. | Pos. | Nation | Player |
|---|---|---|---|
| 23 | MF | SCO | Cole Williams (co-operation loan with Annan Athletic) |
| 26 | MF | SCO | Dylan Williams (on loan at Annan Athletic) |
| 29 | FW | SCO | Divine Iserhienrhein (co-operation loan with Annan Athletic) |

| No. | Pos. | Nation | Player |
|---|---|---|---|
| 36 | MF | SCO | Mason Chisholm (on loan at Brechin City) |
| 38 | MF | SCO | Euan Hamilton (on loan at Brechin City) |

== Managers ==
The Diamonds have appointed 12 permanent managers in their history, while six have taken charge on a caretaker basis.

The longest-serving manager was Sandy Stewart, who served for four years and 135 days.

Only three managers have won a trophy at Airdrieonians. Stewart won the Second Division title in 2004, while Kenny Black and Rhys McCabe won the Challenge Cup in 2008 and 2024 respectively.

| Name | Period |
|---|---|
| (Scotland) Sandy Stewart | 2002–2006 |
| (Scotland) Kenny Black | 2006–2010 |
| (Scotland) Jimmy Boyle | 2010–2013 |
| (Scotland) Gary Bollan | 2013–2015 |
| (Scotland) Eddie Wolecki Black (Note: Danny Lennon was appointed acting head coach from 10 March to 30 April 2016 followed by Kevin McBride from 9 May until 31 October 2016.) | 2015–2016 |
| (Scotland) Mark Wilson | 2016–2017 |
| (Scotland) Stephen Findlay | 2017–2018 |
| (Scotland) Ian Murray | 2018–2022 |
| (Scotland) Rhys McCabe^{p} | 2022–2025 |
| (Northern Ireland) Danny Lennon | 2025 |
| (Antigua and Barbuda) Aaron Taylor-Sinclair^{p} | 2026 |
| (Scotland) John Rankin | 2026– |

^{p} Denotes player-managers

== Club officials ==
=== Coaching staff ===
- Head coach: John Rankin
- Assistant head coach: Declan Gallagher
- First team coach: Bryan Prunty
- Goalkeeping coach: Calum Erskine
- Director of football: Alan Gow
- Performance analyst: Maisie Biggar
- Physiotherapist: Stewart Duff
- Sports scientists: Pete Byrne, Dan Jefferson

=== Boardroom ===
- Chairman: Paul Hetherington
- Managing director: Scott Russell
- Commercial director: Gordon Watson
- Director/Head of facilities: Mark Sneddon
- Associate directors: Iain Allison, Craig Campbell, Brian Hamilton, Stuart Mathie, Stuart Millar, Neil Pardoe
- Club ambassadors: John Lapsley, Willie McGuire, Brian McPhee, Bobby Watson

== Club honours & records ==
=== Honours ===
- Scottish Championship Play-off Final
  - Winners: 2022–23, 2024–25
- Scottish League Second Division
  - Winners: 2003–04
  - Runners up: 2007–08
- Scottish Challenge Cup
  - Winners: 2008–09, 2023–24
  - Runners up: 2003–04

=== Minor Trophies ===
- North Lanarkshire Cup
  - Winners: 2022, 2023
- Meldrum Cup
  - Winners: 2015

=== Records ===
| Record type | Record | Additional information |
|---|---|---|
| Most league points in a season | 72 | in League One 2021–22 |
| Most league goals by a player in a season | 23, Andy Ryan | in League One 2016–17 |
| Record total league appearances | 159, Stephen McKeown | |
| Record total goals | 71, Calum Gallagher | including 59 league goals |
| Record home attendance | 9,044 | v Rangers on 23 August 2013 in League One |
| Record cup wins | 11–0 & 8–0 | 11-0 v Gala Fairydean on 19 November 2011 in Scottish Cup 3rd Round & 8–0 v East Kilbride on 16 July 2024 in the Scottish League Cup Group Stage. |
| Record league win | 7–0 | v Peterhead on 18 March 2023 in League One & v Dundee on 11 March 2006 in Division One |
| Record loss | 0–7 | v Partick Thistle on 20 October 2012 in Division One |

=== International players ===
Only includes caps won while playing for Airdrieonians.

Antigua and Barbuda

- Aaron Taylor-Sinclair (6 Caps, 0 Goals) 2022–2026

18 players were selected for Scotland while playing for the original Airdrieonians, collecting 47 caps in total.

== Official club awards ==
On 18 May 2024 the club announced that the player of the year award would be renamed the Ian McMillan player of the year award after his passing earlier that year.

=== Player of the Year ===
| Season | Ian McMillan Player of the Year | Young Player of the Year |
|---|---|---|
| 2025–26 | Lewis Strapp | Dylan MacDonald |
| 2024–25 | Adam Frizzell | Gavin Gallagher |
| 2023–24 | Charlie Telfer | Mason Hancock |
| 2022–23 | Calum Gallagher | Gabby McGill |
| 2021–22 | Dylan Easton | Callum Smith |
| 2020–21 | Callum Fordyce | Leon McCann |
| 2019–20 | Callum Fordyce | Leon McCann |
| 2018–19 | David Hutton | Josh Edwards |
| 2017–18 | Scott Stewart | Dean Cairns |
| 2016–17 | Andy Ryan | Scott Stewart |
| 2015–16 | David Cox | Nicky Cadden |
| 2014–15 | Paddy Boyle | Luca Gasparotto |
| 2013–14 | Jim Lister | Liam Watt |
| 2012–13 | John Boyle | Chris O'Neil |
| 2011–12 | Ryan Donnelly | Nathan Blockley |
| 2010–11 | Ryan McCord | Jamie Bain |
| 2009–10 | No Award | No Award |
| 2008–09 | Stephen Robertson | Bobby Donnelly |
| 2007–08 | Allan Russell | Kevin Watt |
| 2006–07 | Neil McGowan | Stephen McKenna |
| 2005–06 | Bryan Prunty | Steven McDougall |
| 2004–05 | Marvyn Wilson | Stephen McKenna |
| 2003–04 | David Dunn | Willie McLaren |
| 2002–03 | Jérôme Vareille | Stephen McKeown |

=== Hall of Fame ===
A Hall of Fame was established by the new club in 2002 to honour noted players of the previous entity (some of whom also played for the new club), with more entrants added each year.

- Evan Balfour
- John Ballantyne
- Rose Ballantyne
- Jim Black
- Jimmy Boyle
- Drew Busby
- Antonio Calderon
- Sandy Clark
- Sammy Conn
- James Connor
- Steve Cooper
- Jimmy Crapnell
- Jack Dalziel
- Tommy Duncan
- Stephen Docherty
- Bobby Flavell
- John Flood
- Callum Fordyce
- Tom Forsyth
- Hughie Gallacher
- Calum Gallagher
- Sam Goodwin
- Stevie Gray
- Paul Jack
- Drew Jarvie
- Paul Jonquin
- Jackie Keenan
- Walter Kidd
- John Lapsley
- Alan Lawrence
- Lawrie Leslie
- Paul Lovering
- Alex MacDonald
- Roddy McKenzie
- Jim March
- John Martin
- Kevin McCann
- Willie McCulloch
- Brian McKeown
- Stephen McKeown
- Ian McMillan
- Brian McPhee
- Tommy Murray
- Frank O'Rourke
- Bobby Ramsey
- Jimmy Reid
- John Reid
- Jim Rodger
- Joey Rowan
- Willie Russell
- Jimmy Sandison
- Bob Scott
- Matt Scott
- Andy Smith
- Sandy Stewart
- Bobby Watson
- Jimmy Welch
- Derek Whiteford
- Billy Wilson

== See also ==
- Section B
