= List of Partick Thistle F.C. managers =

This is a list of people to manage Partick Thistle Football Club since their formation in 1876.

As of July 2013, the club have had 25 permanent managers, including joint managers. John Lambie has managed the club on the most occasions, leading the club four times.

== Managers ==
As of 27 November 2016(UTC)

#	Name	Nationality	From	To	P	W	D	L	Win% (Note: Win% is the percentage of matches won rounded to two decimal places.)	Honours	Manner of departure	Refs
25Đ	Alan Archibald	Scotland	30 January 2013 (Note: Interim appointment made on 30 January before being made permanent on 22 March.)	6 October 2018	250	84	62	104	33.60	2012–13 First Division	Sacked	
24	Jackie McNamara	Scotland	15 April 2011 (Note: Interim appointment made on 15 April 2011 before being made permanent on 12 May.)	30 January 2013	75	34	17	24	45.33		Resigned to become boss of Dundee United	
23	Ian McCall	Scotland	25 May 2007	15 April 2011	175	70	42	63	40.00		Resigned	
22	Dick Campbell	Scotland	4 January 2005	27 March 2007	103	40	26	37	38.83	First Division Playoffs	Sacked	
21	Gerry Britton & Derek Whyte	Scotland	30 November 2003 (Note: Interim appointment made on 30 November 2003 before being made permanent on 23 December.)	20 December 2004	52	16	10	26	30.77		Removed from post	
20	Gerry Collins	Scotland	June 2003	30 November 2003	15	0	3	12	0.00		Sacked	
19	John Lambie	Scotland	March 1999	June 2003	180	74	47	59	41.11	2000–01 Second Division,2001–02 First Division	Retired became director at club	
18	Tommy Bryce	Scotland	1998	1999	32	13	4	15	40.63		Sacked	
17	John McVeigh	Scotland	1997	1998	39	8	12	19	20.51		Sacked	
16	Murdo MacLeod	Scotland	1995	1997	85	26	20	39	30.59		Sacked	
15	John Lambie	Scotland	1990	1995	231	80	70	81	34.63	1991–92 First Division 2nd Place, Promotion to Premier Division	Left in 1995 to become manager of Falkirk FC	
14	Sandy Clark	Scotland	1989	1990	17	2	6	9	11.76		Sacked	
13	John Lambie	Scotland	1988	1989	54	24	17	13	44.44		Left to return to Hamilton Accies	
12	Billy Lamont	Scotland	1987	1988	67	22	14	31	32.84			
11	Derek Johnstone	Scotland	1986	1987	35	8	11	16	22.86			
10	Bertie Auld	Scotland	1986	1986	7	3	3	1	42.86			
9	Benny Rooney	Scotland	1984	1986	79	20	24	35	25.32			
8	Peter Cormack	Scotland	1980	1984	168	61	42	65	36.31			
7	Bertie Auld	Scotland	1974	1980	310	122	82	106	39.35	1975–76 First Division		
6	Davie McParland	Scotland	1970	1974	187	71	53	63	37.97	1970–71 Second Division, 1971 Scottish League Cup		
5	Scot Symon	Scotland	1968	1970	78	14	19	45	17.95			
4	Willie Thornton	Scotland	1959	1968	408	151	85	172	37.01			
3	David Meiklejohn	Scotland	1947	1959	528	223	104	201	42.23			
2	Donald Turner	Scotland	1929	1947	765	298	149	318	38.95			
1	George Easton	Scotland	1903	1929	1,053	392	242	419	37.23	1920–21 Scottish Cup		

=== Caretaker managers ===
Name	Nationality	From	To	P	W	D	L	Win%	Notes
Jimmy Bone	Scotland	27 March 2007	25 May 2007	6	1	3	2	16.67	
John Lambie	Scotland	20 December 2004	4 January 2005	3	1	1	1	33.33	
Gerry Collins	Scotland	March 1990	March 1990	1	0	0	1	0.00	
Bobby Watson	Scotland	October 1988	November 1988	3	1	1	1	33.33	
John Hagart	Scotland	March 1987	April 1987	8	2	3	3	25.00	
Pat Quinn	Scotland	November 1980	December 1980	3	0	1	2	0.00	
