= 2018–19 in Scottish football =

122nd season of competitive football in Scotland

Football in Scotland
- Season: 2018–19

2018–19 in Scottish football

Premiership champions
- Celtic

Championship champions
- Ross County

League 1 champions
- Arbroath

League 2 champions
- Peterhead

Scottish Cup winners
- Celtic

League Cup winners
- Celtic

Challenge Cup winners
- Ross County

Youth Cup winners
- Rangers

Teams in Europe
- Celtic, Aberdeen, Rangers, Hibernian

Scotland national team
- 2018–19 UEFA Nations League C UEFA Euro 2020 qualifying

The 2018–19 season was the 122nd season of competitive football in Scotland. The domestic season began on 14 July 2018, with the first round of matches in the 2018–19 Scottish League Cup. The 2018–19 Scottish Professional Football League season commenced on 4 August.

== Transfer deals ==
Celtic sold striker Moussa Dembélé to Lyon for €22 million (about £19.7 million), a record transfer fee received by a Scottish club at the time.

== League competitions ==
=== Scottish Premiership ===
Pos	Team	Pld	W	D	L	GF	GA	GD	Pts	Qualification or relegation (Note: Teams play each other three times (33 matches), before the league is split into two groups (the top six and the bottom six).)
1	Celtic (C)	38	27	6	5	77	20	+57	87	Qualification for the Champions League first qualifying round
2	Rangers	38	23	9	6	82	27	+55	78	Qualification for the Europa League first qualifying round
3	Kilmarnock	38	19	10	9	50	31	+19	67	Qualification for the Europa League first qualifying round
4	Aberdeen	38	20	7	11	57	44	+13	67	Qualification for the Europa League first qualifying round
5	Hibernian	38	14	12	12	51	39	+12	54	
6	Heart of Midlothian	38	15	6	17	42	50	−8	51	
7	St Johnstone	38	15	7	16	38	48	−10	52	
8	Motherwell	38	15	6	17	46	56	−10	51	
9	Livingston	38	11	11	16	42	44	−2	44	
10	Hamilton Academical	38	9	6	23	28	75	−47	33	
11	St Mirren (O)	38	8	8	22	34	66	−32	32	Qualification for the Premiership play-off final
12	Dundee (R)	38	5	6	27	31	78	−47	21	Relegation to the Championship

Source: Soccerway BBC SPFL
Rules for classification: 1) Points; 2) Goal difference; 3) Goals scored; 4) Play-off (only if deciding champion, UEFA competitions qualification and second stage group allocation).
(C) Champions; (O) Play-off winners; (R) Relegated

=== Scottish Championship ===
Pos	Team	Pld	W	D	L	GF	GA	GD	Pts	Promotion, qualification or relegation
1	Ross County (C, P)	36	21	8	7	63	34	+29	71	Promotion to the Premiership
2	Dundee United	36	19	8	9	49	40	+9	65	Qualification for the Premiership play-off semi-final
3	Inverness Caledonian Thistle	36	14	14	8	48	40	+8	56	Qualification for the Premiership play-off quarter-final
4	Ayr United	36	15	9	12	50	38	+12	54	Qualification for the Premiership play-off quarter-final
5	Greenock Morton	36	11	13	12	36	45	−9	46	
6	Partick Thistle	36	12	7	17	43	52	−9	43	
7	Dunfermline Athletic	36	11	8	17	33	40	−7	41	
8	Alloa Athletic	36	10	9	17	39	53	−14	39	
9	Queen of the South (O)	36	9	11	16	41	48	−7	38	Qualification for the Championship play-offs
10	Falkirk (R)	36	9	11	16	37	49	−12	38	Relegation to League One

Source: SPFL
Rules for classification: 1) Points; 2) Goal difference; 3) Goals scored; 4) Points in head-to-head matches; 5) Goal difference in hth matches; 6). Goals scored in hth matches; 7). Play-off (only for deciding promotion, play-off participation and relegation).
(C) Champions; (O) Play-off winners; (P) Promoted; (R) Relegated

=== Scottish League One ===
Pos	Team	Pld	W	D	L	GF	GA	GD	Pts	Promotion, qualification or relegation
1	Arbroath (C, P)	36	20	10	6	63	38	+25	70	Promotion to the Championship
2	Forfar Athletic	36	19	6	11	54	47	+7	63	Qualification for the Championship play-offs
3	Raith Rovers	36	16	12	8	74	48	+26	60	Qualification for the Championship play-offs
4	Montrose	36	15	6	15	49	50	−1	51	Qualification for the Championship play-offs
5	Airdrieonians	36	14	6	16	51	44	+7	48	
6	Dumbarton	36	12	10	14	60	60	0	46	
7	East Fife	36	13	7	16	49	56	−7	46	
8	Stranraer	36	11	9	16	45	57	−12	42	
9	Stenhousemuir (R)	36	10	7	19	35	61	−26	37	Qualification for the League One play-offs
10	Brechin City (R)	36	9	9	18	42	61	−19	36	Relegation to League Two

Source: SPFL
Rules for classification: 1) Points; 2) Goal difference; 3) Number of goals scored
(C) Champions; (P) Promoted; (R) Relegated

=== Scottish League Two ===
Pos	Team	Pld	W	D	L	GF	GA	GD	Pts	Promotion, qualification or relegation
1	Peterhead (C, P)	36	24	7	5	65	29	+36	79	Promotion to League One
2	Clyde (Note: Albion Rovers and Queen's Park were awarded 3–0 technical victories against Clyde in February 2019 after Clyde fielded an ineligible player. The original matches had finished 1–0 to Clyde and 1–1 respectively.) (O, P)	36	23	5	8	63	35	+28	74	Qualification for the League One play-offs
3	Edinburgh City	36	20	7	9	58	31	+27	67	Qualification for the League One play-offs
4	Annan Athletic	36	20	6	10	70	39	+31	66	Qualification for the League One play-offs
5	Stirling Albion	36	13	8	15	44	45	−1	47	
6	Cowdenbeath	36	12	7	17	46	46	0	43	
7	Queen's Park	36	11	10	15	44	47	−3	43	
8	Elgin City	36	13	4	19	52	67	−15	43	
9	Albion Rovers	36	7	6	23	32	71	−39	27	
10	Berwick Rangers (R)	36	5	4	27	27	91	−64	19	Qualification for the League Two play-off final

Source: SPFL
Rules for classification: 1) Points; 2) Goal difference; 3) Number of goals scored
(C) Champions; (O) Play-off winners; (P) Promoted; (R) Relegated

=== Non-league football ===
==== Level 5 ====
Highland Football League
Pos	Team	Pld	Pts
1	Cove Rangers (C, O, P)	34	93
2	Brora Rangers	34	85
3	Fraserburgh	34	79
4	Formartine United	34	72
5	Inverurie Loco Works	34	66
6	Forres Mechanics	34	66
7	Wick Academy	34	52
8	Buckie Thistle	34	49
9	Huntly	34	49
10	Rothes	34	44
11	Nairn County	34	42
12	Deveronvale	34	41
13	Keith	34	37
14	Strathspey Thistle	34	33
15	Turriff United	34	32
16	Clachnacuddin	34	24
17	Lossiemouth	34	8
18	Fort William	34	−7

Source: SHFL BBC Sport Soccerway
(C) Champions;
(O) Play-off winners;
(P) Promoted

Lowland Football League
Pos	Team	Pld	Pts
1	East Kilbride (C)	28	72
2	BSC Glasgow	28	61
3	Kelty Hearts	28	54
4	The Spartans	28	51
5	Civil Service Strollers	28	49
6	East Stirlingshire	28	39
7	Cumbernauld Colts	28	39
8	Gala Fairydean Rovers	28	34
9	Edusport Academy	28	33
10	Stirling University	28	31
11	Edinburgh University	28	30
12	Gretna 2008	28	29
13	Vale of Leithen	28	29
14	Dalbeattie Star	28	22
15	Whitehill Welfare (R)	28	12
16	Selkirk	0	0

Source: SLFL BBC Sport Soccerway
(C) Champions;
(R) Relegated

==== Level 6 ====
East of Scotland Football League Championship play-off
Pos	Team	Pld	Pts
1	Bonnyrigg Rose Athletic (C, P)	2	6
2	Penicuik Athletic	2	3
3	Broxburn Athletic	2	0

Source: East of Scotland Football League
(C) Champion;
(P) Promoted

South of Scotland Football League
Pos	Team	Pld	Pts
1	Stranraer reserves (C)	30	88
2	Bonnyton Thistle	30	70
3	Nithsdale Wanderers	30	60
4	Abbey Vale	30	57
5	Upper Annandale	30	57
6	Mid-Annandale	30	55
7	Lochar Thistle	30	53
8	Heston Rovers	30	48
9	Threave Rovers	30	45
10	St Cuthbert Wanderers	30	45
11	Lochmaben	30	29
12	Wigtown & Bladnoch	30	27
13	Newton Stewart	30	22
14	Creetown	30	19
15	Dumfries YMCA	30	11
16	Annan Athletic reserves	30	2

Source: South of Scotland Football League
(C) Champions

=== SPFL Reserve League ===
In 2018, the Development League was abolished and replaced by a reserve team competition.

== Honours ==
Competition	Winner	Score	Runner-up	Match report
2018–19 Scottish Cup	Celtic	2–1	Heart of Midlothian	BBC Sport
2018–19 League Cup	Celtic	1–0	Aberdeen	BBC Sport
2018–19 Challenge Cup	Ross County	3–1	Connah's Quay Nomads	BBC Sport
2018–19 Youth Cup	Rangers	3–2	Celtic	BBC Sport
2018–19 Junior Cup	Auchinleck Talbot	2–0	Largs Thistle	BBC Sport
2018–19 South Challenge Cup	East Kilbride	2–1	Bonnyrigg Rose Athletic	Edinburgh Evening News
2018–19 Amateur Cup	Colville Park	2 – 0	Eastfield	Glasgow World

=== Non-league honours ===
==== Senior ====
Competition	Winner
Highland League	Cove Rangers
Lowland League	East Kilbride
East of Scotland League	Bonnyrigg Rose Athletic
South of Scotland League	Stranraer reserves

==== Junior ====
West Region

Division	Winner
Premiership	Auchinleck Talbot
Championship	Rutherglen Glencairn
League One	Gartcairn Juniors
League Two	Lanark United

East Region

Division	Winner
Superleague	Lochee United
Premier League North	Dundee North End
Premier League South	Pumpherston

North Region

Division	Winner
Superleague	Banks O' Dee
North First Division	Banchory St. Ternan
North Second Division	Buchanhaven Hearts

=== Reserve honours ===
Competition	Winner	Runner-up	Ref
Reserve League	Rangers	Celtic	
Reserve League 2	Livingston	Ayr United	
Reserve League Cup	Heart of Midlothian	Motherwell	
Reserve Challenge Cup	Ayr United	Livingston	

=== Individual honours ===
==== PFA Scotland awards ====
Award	Winner	Team
Players' Player of the Year	James Forrest	Celtic
Young Player of the Year	Ryan Kent	Rangers
Manager of the Year	Steve Clarke	Kilmarnock
Championship Player of Year	Stephen Dobbie	Queen of the South
League One Player of Year	Bobby Linn	Arbroath
League Two Player of Year	Blair Henderson	Edinburgh City

==== SFWA awards ====
Award	Winner	Team
Footballer of the Year	James Forrest	Celtic
Young Player of the Year	David Turnbull	Motherwell
Manager of the Year	Steve Clarke	Kilmarnock
International Player of the Year	James Forrest	Celtic

==== SPFL awards ====
Award	Winner	Team
Premiership Manager	Steve Clarke	Kilmarnock
Premiership Player	James Forrest	Celtic
Championship Manager	Steve Ferguson and Stuart Kettlewell	Ross County
Championship Player	Stephen Dobbie	Queen of the South
League One Manager	Dick Campbell	Arbroath
League One Player	Bobby Linn	Arbroath
League Two Manager	Danny Lennon	Clyde
League Two Player	Blair Henderson	Edinburgh City

== Scottish clubs in Europe ==
=== Summary ===
Club	Competitions	Started round	Final round	Coef.
Celtic	UEFA Champions League	First qualifying round	Third qualifying round	11.5
Celtic	UEFA Europa League	Play-off round	Round of 32	11.5
Aberdeen	UEFA Europa League	Second qualifying round		0.5
Rangers	UEFA Europa League	First qualifying round	Group Stage	11.0
Hibernian	UEFA Europa League	First qualifying round	Third qualifying round	4.0
Total				27.0
Average				6.750

=== Celtic ===
UEFA Champions League

Celtic started in the first qualifying round of the 2018–19 UEFA Champions League, and were drawn against Armenian club Alashkert.

10 July 2018 QR1	Alashkert (Armenia)	0–3	(Scotland) Celtic	Yerevan
		BBC Sport	Edouard 45+1'; Forrest 81'; McGregor 90'	Stadium: Alashkert Stadium; Referee: Danilo Grujic (Serbia)

18 July 2018 QR1	Celtic (Scotland)	3–0 (6–0 agg.)	(Armenia) Alashkert	Glasgow
	Dembélé 7', 19' (pen.); Forrest 35'	BBC Sport		Stadium: Celtic Park; Referee: Horatiu Fesnic (Romania)

25 July 2018 QR2	Celtic (Scotland)	3–1	(Norway) Rosenborg	Glasgow
	Edouard 43', 75'; Ntcham 46'	BBC Sport	Meling 15'	Stadium: Celtic Park; Referee: Bart Vertenten (Belgium)

1 August 2018 QR2	Rosenborg (Norway)	0–0 (1–3 agg.)	(Scotland) Celtic	Trondheim
		BBC Sport		Stadium: Lerkendal Stadion; Referee: Sandro Schärer (Switzerland)

8 August 2018 QR3	Celtic (Scotland)	1–1	(Greece) AEK Athens	Glasgow
	McGregor 17'	BBC Sport	Klonaridis 44'	Stadium: Celtic Park; Referee: Luca Banti (Italy)

14 August 2018 QR3	AEK Athens (Greece)	2–1 (3–2 agg.)	(Scotland) Celtic	Athens
	Galo 6'; Livaja 50'	BBC Sport	Sinclair 78'	Stadium: Olympic Stadium; Referee: Vladislav Bezborodov (Russia)

UEFA Europa League

Having lost in the third qualifying round of the Champions League, Celtic dropped into the play-off round of the 2018–19 UEFA Europa League.

23 August 2018 PO	Suduva (Lithuania)	1–1	(Scotland) Celtic	Marijampolė
	Verbickas 13'	BBC Sport	Ntcham 3'	Stadium: Sūduva Stadium; Referee: Ivan Bebek (Croatia)

30 August 2018 PO	Celtic (Scotland)	3–0 (4–1 agg.)	(Lithuania) Suduva	Glasgow
	Griffiths 27'; McGregor 52'; Ajer 61'	BBC Sport		Stadium: Celtic Park; Referee: Georgi Kabakov (Bulgaria)

Group stage

Pos	Team	Pld	W	D	L	GF	GA	GD	Pts	Qualification	SAL	CEL	RBL	ROS
1	(Austria) Red Bull Salzburg	6	6	0	0	17	6	+11	18	Advance to knockout phase	—	3–1	1–0	3–0
2	(Scotland) Celtic	6	3	0	3	6	8	−2	9	Advance to knockout phase	1–2	—	2–1	1–0
3	(Germany) RB Leipzig	6	2	1	3	9	8	+1	7		2–3	2–0	—	1–1
4	(Norway) Rosenborg	6	0	1	5	4	14	−10	1		2–5	0–1	1–3	—

Source: UEFA
Rules for classification: Group stage tiebreakers

Celtic finished second in Group B, and progressed to the knockout rounds.

20 September 2018 Group B	Celtic (Scotland)	1–0	(Norway) Rosenborg	Glasgow
	Griffiths 87'	BBC Sport		Stadium: Celtic Park; Referee: Pawel Gil (Poland)

4 October 2018 Group B	Red Bull Salzburg (Austria)	3–1	(Scotland) Celtic	Salzburg
	Dabbur 55', 73' (pen.); Minamino 61'	BBC Sport	Edouard 2'	Stadium: Red Bull Arena; Referee: Sergey Boyko (Ukraine)

25 October 2018 Group B	RB Leipzig (Germany)	2–0	(Scotland) Celtic	Leipzig
	Cunha 31'; Bruma 35'	BBC Sport		Stadium: Red Bull Arena; Referee: Pavel Královec (Czechia)

8 November 2018 Group B	Celtic (Scotland)	2–1	(Germany) RB Leipzig	Glasgow
	Tierney 11'; Edouard 79'	BBC Sport	Augustin 78'	Stadium: Celtic Park; Referee: Javier Estrada Fernández (Spain)

29 November 2018 Group B	Rosenborg (Norway)	0–1	(Scotland) Celtic	Trondheim
		BBC Sport	Sinclair 42'	Stadium: Lerkendal Stadion; Referee: Halis Özkahya (Turkey)

13 December 2018 Group B	Celtic (Scotland)	1–2	(Austria) Red Bull Salzburg	Glasgow
	Ntcham 90+7'	BBC Sport	Dabbur 67'; Gulbrandsen 77'	Stadium: Celtic Park; Referee: Ruddy Buquet (France)

Knockout stage

14 February 2019 R32	Celtic (Scotland)	0–2	(Spain) Valencia	Glasgow
		BBC Sport	Cheryshev 42'; Sobrino 49'	Stadium: Celtic Park; Referee: Ovidiu Hategan (Romania)

21 February 2019 R32	Valencia (Spain)	1–0 (3–0 agg.)	(Scotland) Celtic	Valencia
	Gameiro 70'	BBC Sport		Stadium: Mestalla; Referee: Deniz Aytekin (Germany)

=== Aberdeen ===
UEFA Europa League

Having finished second in the 2017–18 Scottish Premiership, Aberdeen started in the second qualifying round of the 2018–19 UEFA Europa League.

26 July 2018 QR2	Aberdeen (Scotland)	1–1	(England) Burnley	Aberdeen
	Mackay-Steven 19' (pen.)	BBC Sport	Vokes 80'	Stadium: Pittodrie Stadium; Attendance: 20,313; Referee: Daniel Siebert (Germany)

2 August 2018 QR2	Burnley (England)	3–1 (a.e.t.) (4–2 agg.)	(Scotland) Aberdeen	Burnley
	Wood 6'; Cork 101'; Barnes 114'	BBC Sport	Ferguson 27'	Stadium: Turf Moor; Referee: Massimiliano Irrati (Italy)

=== Rangers ===
UEFA Europa League

Rangers started in the first qualifying round of the 2018–19 UEFA Europa League, where they were drawn to play Macedonian club Shkupi.

12 July 2018 QR1	Rangers (Scotland)	2–0	(North Macedonia) Shkupi	Glasgow
	Murphy 23'; Tavernier 90+2' (pen.)	BBC Sport		Stadium: Ibrox Stadium; Attendance: 49,309; Referee: Christian Dingert (Germany)

17 July 2018 QR1	Shkupi (North Macedonia)	0–0 (0–2 agg.)	(Scotland) Rangers	Skopje
		BBC Sport		Stadium: Philip II Arena; Referee: Halil Meler (Turkey)

26 July 2018 QR2	Osijek (Croatia)	0–1	(Scotland) Rangers	Osijek
		BBC Sport	Morelos 18'	Stadium: Stadion Gradski vrt Referee: Pawel Gil (Poland)

2 August 2018 QR2	Rangers (Scotland)	1–1 (2–1 agg.)	(Croatia) Osijek	Glasgow
	Katić 53'	BBC Sport	Barisic 89'	Stadium: Ibrox Stadium; Referee: Dennis Higler (Netherlands)

9 August 2018 QR3	Rangers (Scotland)	3–1	(Slovenia) Maribor	Glasgow
	Morelos 6'; Tavernier 50' (pen.); Coulibaly 86'	BBC Sport	Viler 40'	Stadium: Ibrox Stadium; Referee: Roi Reinshreiber (Israel)

16 August 2018 QR3	Maribor (Slovenia)	0–0 (1–3 agg.)	(Scotland) Rangers	Maribor
		BBC Sport		Stadium: Ljudski vrt Referee: Jonathan Lardot (Belgium)

23 August 2018 PO	Rangers (Scotland)	1–0	(Russia) Ufa	Glasgow
	Goldson 41'	BBC Sport		Stadium: Ibrox Stadium; Referee: Daniel Stefański (Poland)

30 August 2018 PO	Ufa (Russia)	1–1 (1–2 agg.)	(Scotland) Rangers	Ufa
	Sysuev 32'	BBC Sport	Ejaria 9'	Stadium: Neftyanik Stadium; Referee: Tobias Stieler (Germany)

Group stage

Pos	Team	Pld	W	D	L	GF	GA	GD	Pts	Qualification	VIL	RW	RAN	SPM
1	(Spain) Villarreal	6	2	4	0	12	5	+7	10 (Note: Head-to-head points: Villarreal 4, Rapid Wien 1.)	Advance to knockout phase	—	5–0	2–2	2–0
2	(Austria) Rapid Wien	6	3	1	2	6	9	−3	10	Advance to knockout phase	0–0	—	1–0	2–0
3	(Scotland) Rangers	6	1	3	2	8	8	0	6		0–0	3–1	—	0–0
4	(Russia) Spartak Moscow	6	1	2	3	8	12	−4	5		3–3	1–2	4–3	—

Source: UEFA
Rules for classification: Group stage tiebreakers
Notes:

20 September 2018 Group G	Villarreal (Spain)	2–2	(Scotland) Rangers	Villarreal
	Bacca 1'; Moreno 69'	BBC Sport	Arfield 67'; Lafferty 76'	Stadium: Estadio de la Cerámica; Referee: Istvan Kovacs (Romania)

4 October 2018 Group G	Rangers (Scotland)	3–1	(Austria) Rapid Wien	Glasgow
	Morelos 43', 90+4'; Tavernier 84' (pen.)	BBC Sport	Berisha 42'	Stadium: Ibrox Stadium; Referee: Ruddy Buquet (France)

25 October 2018 Group G	Rangers (Scotland)	0–0	(Russia) Spartak Moscow	Glasgow
		BBC Sport		Stadium: Ibrox Stadium; Referee: Kevin Blom (Netherlands)

8 November 2018 Group G	Spartak Moscow (Russia)	4–3	(Scotland) Rangers	Moscow
	Melgarejo 22'; Goldson 35' (o.g.); Luiz Adriano 58'; Hanni 59'	BBC Sport	Eremenko 5' (o.g.); Candeias 27'; Middleton 41'	Stadium: Otkritie Arena; Referee: Ivan Bebek (Croatia)

29 November 2018 Group G	Rangers (Scotland)	0–0	(Spain) Villarreal	Glasgow
		BBC Sport		Stadium: Ibrox Stadium; Referee: Matej Jug (Slovenia)

13 December 2018 Group G	Rapid Wien (Austria)	1–0	(Scotland) Rangers	Vienna
	Ljubicic 84'	BBC Sport		Stadium: Allianz Stadion; Referee: Paolo Silvio Mazzoleni (Italy)

=== Hibernian ===
UEFA Europa League

Hibernian started in the first qualifying round of the 2018–19 UEFA Europa League, and were paired with Faroese club Runavík.

12 July 2018 QR1	Hibernian (Scotland)	6–1	(Faroe Islands) Runavík	Edinburgh
	Kamberi 3' (pen.), 21', 48'; Shaw 29'; Mallan 43', 84'	BBC Sport	Knudsen 53'	Stadium: Easter Road; Attendance: 12,501; Referee: Manfredas Lukjancukas (Lithuania)

19 July 2018 QR1	Runavík (Faroe Islands)	4–6 (5–12 agg.)	(Scotland) Hibernian	Toftir
	Ambrose 1' (o.g.); Olsen 6', 35', 57'	BBC Sport	McGinn 10'; Stevenson 16'; Gray 45+1'; Ambrose 50'; Mallan 70', 77'	Stadium: Svangaskard Stadium; Referee: Luis Miguel Teixeira (Portugal)

26 July 2018 QR2	Hibernian (Scotland)	3–2	(Greece) Asteras Tripolis	Edinburgh
	Ambrose 64'; Gray 77'; Kamberi 90+3'	BBC Sport	Kyriakopoulous 12', 35'	Stadium: Easter Road; Referee: Andreas Ekberg (Sweden)

2 August 2018 QR2	Asteras Tripolis (Greece)	1–1 (3–4 agg.)	(Scotland) Hibernian	Tripoli
	Tsilianidis 56'	BBC Sport	McGinn 44'	Stadium: Theodoros Kolokotronis Stadium; Referee: Benoît Millot (France)

9 August 2018 QR3	Hibernian (Scotland)	0–0	(Norway) Molde	Edinburgh
		BBC Sport		Stadium: Easter Road; Referee: Adam Farkas (Hungary)

16 August 2018 QR3	Molde (Norway)	3–0 (3–0 agg.)	(Scotland) Hibernian	Molde
	Haaland 35', 82'; Aursnes 66'	BBC Sport		Stadium: Aker Stadion; Referee: Dennis Higler (Netherlands)

== Scotland national team ==
7 September 2018 Friendly match	Scotland	0–4	Belgium	Glasgow
		BBC Sport	Lukaku 28'; Hazard 46'; Batshuayi 52', 60'	Stadium: Hampden Park; Attendance: 20,196; Referee: Luca Banti (Italy)

10 September 2018 Nations League C	Scotland	2–0	Albania	Glasgow
	Djimsiti 47' (o.g.); Naismith 68'	BBC Sport		Stadium: Hampden Park; Referee: Matej Jug (Slovenia)

11 October 2018 Nations League C	Israel	2–1	Scotland	Haifa
	Peretz 52'; Tierney 74' (o.g.)	BBC Sport	Mulgrew 25' (pen.)	Stadium: Sammy Ofer Stadium; Referee: Daniel Stefanski (Poland)

14 October 2018 Friendly match	Scotland	1–3	Portugal	Glasgow
	Naismith 90+3'	BBC Sport	Costa 43'; Eder 74'; Bruma 84'	Stadium: Hampden Park; Referee: Ruddy Buquet (France)

17 November 2018 Nations League C	Albania	0–4	Scotland	Shkodër
		BBC Sport	Fraser 14'; Fletcher 45+2' (pen.); Forrest 55', 67'	Stadium: Loro Boriçi Stadium; Referee: Vladislav Bezborodov (Russia)

20 November 2018 Nations League C	Scotland	3–2	Israel	Glasgow
	Forrest 34', 43', 64'	BBC Sport	Kayal 9'; Zahavi 75'	Stadium: Hampden Park; Referee: Tobias Welz (Germany)

21 March 2019 Euro 2020 qualifying	Kazakhstan	3–0	Scotland	Astana
	Pertsukh 6'; Vorogovskiy 10'; Zainutdinov 51'	BBC Sport		Stadium: Astana Arena; Referee: Srđan Jovanović (Serbia)

24 March 2019 Euro 2020 qualifying	San Marino	0–2	Scotland	Serravalle
		BBC Sport	McLean 4'; Russell 74'	Stadium: Stadio Olimpico; Referee: Manuel Schüttengruber (Austria)

8 June 2019 Euro 2020 qualifying	Scotland	2–1	Cyprus	Glasgow
	Robertson 61'; Burke 89'	BBC Sport	Kousoulos 87'	Stadium: Hampden Park; Referee: Ola Hobber Nilsen (Norway)

11 June 2019 Euro 2020 qualifying	Belgium	3–0	Scotland	Brussels
	Lukaku 45+1', 57'; De Bruyne 90+2'	BBC Sport		Stadium: King Baudouin Stadium; Referee: Petr Ardeleánu (Czech Republic)

== Women's football ==
=== League and Cup honours ===
Division	Winner
2018 SWPL 1	Glasgow City
2018 SWPL 2	Motherwell
2018 SWFL First Division (North)	Dundee United
2018 SWFL First Division (South)	Hibernian 23s
2018 SWFL Second Division (West)	Ayr United
2018 SWFL Second Division (Central)	Glasgow City Development
2018 SWFL Second Division (East)	Kelty Hearts CC
2018 SWFL Second Division (North)	Montrose

Competition	Winner	Score	Runner-up	Match report
2018 Scottish Women's Cup	Hibernian	8–0	Motherwell	BBC Sport
2018 SWPL Cup	Hibernian	9–0	Celtic	BBC Sport
SWFL First Division Cup	Celtic Academy	1–0	Hibernian 23s	
SWFL Second Division Cup				

=== Individual honours ===
==== SWPL awards ====
Award	Winner	Team
Players' Player of the Year		
Player of the Year		
Manager of the Year		
Young Player of the Year		

=== Scottish Women's Premier League ===
==== SWPL 1 ====
Pos	Team	Pld	W	D	L	GF	GA	GD	Pts	Qualification or relegation
1	Glasgow City (C, Q)	21	19	2	0	75	12	+63	59	Qualification for the Champions League Round of 32
2	Hibernian (Q)	21	18	2	1	80	17	+63	56	Qualification for the Champions League Qualifying Round
3	Celtic	21	11	3	7	41	31	+10	36	
4	Rangers	21	8	1	12	33	46	−13	25	
5	Forfar Farmington	21	7	2	12	20	45	−25	23	
6	Spartans	21	4	4	13	23	46	−23	16	
7	Stirling University	21	4	3	14	17	54	−37	15	
8	Hamilton Academical (R)	21	3	3	15	17	55	−38	12	Relegation to SWPL 2

Source: Soccerway
Rules for classification: 1) Points; 2) Goal difference; 3) Number of goals scored
(C) Champions; (Q) Qualified for the phase indicated; (R) Relegated

=== UEFA Women's Champions League ===
==== Glasgow City ====
Glasgow City entered the Champions League in the qualifying round.

7 August 2018 Qualifying group 3	Glasgow City (Scotland)	1–2	(Belgium) Anderlecht	Edinburgh
12:30	Ivanuša 90+3'	Report	Van Kerkhoven 24'; Van Gorp 82'	Stadium: Oriam; Referee: Tanja Subotič

10 August 2018 Qualifying group 3	Glasgow City (Scotland)	7–0	(Georgia (country)) Martve	Edinburgh
12:30	Grant 4', 23'; Howat 46', 68', 86'; Love 52'; Clark 82'	Report		Stadium: Oriam; Referee: Shona Shukrula

13 August 2018 Qualifying group 3	Glasgow City (Scotland)	2–0	(Poland) Górnik Łęczna	Edinburgh
16:00	Love 33'; Kerr 85'	Report		Stadium: Oriam; Referee: Tanja Subotič

12 September 2018 Round of 32	Barcelona FA (Cyprus)	0–2	(Scotland) Glasgow City	Limassol
15:30		Report	Lauder 3'; Crichton 83'	Stadium: Tsirion Stadium; Referee: Viola Raudziņa

27 September 2018 Round of 32	Glasgow City (Scotland)	0–1 (2–1 agg.)	(Cyprus) Barcelona FA	Glasgow
19:30		BBC Sport	Freda 6'	Stadium: Petershill Park; Attendance: 511

17 October 2018 Round of 16	Barcelona (Spain)	5–0	(Scotland) Glasgow City	Barcelona
18:00	Hamraoui; Bonmatí; Guijarro; Andressa Alves; Mapi León	BBC Sport		Stadium: Mini Estadi

1 November 2018 Round of 16	Glasgow City (Scotland)	0–3 (0–8 agg.)	(Spain) Barcelona	Glasgow
19:30		BBC Sport	Duggan 13', 51'; Putellas 48'	Stadium: Petershill Park

=== Scotland women's national team ===
With a 2–1 win against Albania in the final round of group fixtures, Scotland qualified for their first World Cup finals tournament by winning UEFA Group 2.

30 August 2018 2019 WCQ Group 2	Scotland	2–1	Switzerland	Paisley
19:35	Cuthbert 2'; Little 5'	BBC Sport	Dickenmann 7'	Stadium: St Mirren Park; Attendance: 4,098; Referee: Sara Persson

4 September 2018 2019 WCQ Group 2	Albania	1–2	Scotland	Shkodër
16:00	Doci 45'	Report	Little 9'; J. Ross 68'	Stadium: Loro Boriçi Stadium; Referee: Barbara Poxhofer

13 November 2018 Friendly	Scotland	0–1	United States	Paisley
19:15		BBC Sport	Morgan 39'	Stadium: St Mirren Park; Attendance: 3,790; Referee: Amy Fearn

17 January 2019 Friendly	Scotland	1–3	Norway	La Manga
17:00	Weir 53' (pen.)	BBC Sport	Hansen; Utland

21 January 2019 Friendly	Scotland	1–2	Iceland	La Manga
15:00	Clelland 90'	BBC Sport	Jensen 49', 54'

1 March 2019 2019 Algarve Cup	Scotland	0–1	Canada	Lagos
13:15		BBC Sport	Sinclair 80' (pen.)	Stadium: Estadio Municipal de Lagos

4 March 2019 2019 Algarve Cup	Scotland	4–1	Iceland	Parchal
14:00	Arnot 13', 67'; Cuthbert 33'; Little 55'	BBC Sport	Gunnarsdottir 57'	Stadium: Estadio Municipal da Bela Vista

6 March 2019 2019 Algarve Cup	Scotland	1–0	Denmark	São João da Venda
13:15	J. Ross 34'	BBC Sport		Stadium: Estádio Algarve

5 April 2019 Friendly	Scotland	1–1	Chile	San Pedro del Pinatar
18:00	Cuthbert 19'	BBC Sport	Araya 49' (pen.)	Stadium: Pinatar Arena Football Centre

8 April 2019 Friendly	Scotland	1–0	Brazil	San Pedro del Pinatar
19:00	Little 38'	BBC Sport		Stadium: Pinatar Arena Football Centre; Referee: Petra Pavlikova

28 May 2019 Friendly	Scotland	3–2	Jamaica	Glasgow
19:35 BST	Cuthbert 30'; Weir 35'; Howard 68'	BBC Sport	Shaw 15', 49'	Stadium: Hampden Park; Attendance: 18,555

9 June 2019 2019 WC Group D	England	2–1	Scotland	Nice
17:00 BST	Parris 14' (pen.); White 40'	BBC Sport	Emslie 79'	Stadium: Stade de Nice; Attendance: 13,188; Referee: Jana Adamkova

14 June 2019 2019 WC Group D	Japan	2–1	Scotland	Rennes
14:00 BST	Iwabuchi 23'; Sugasawa 37' (pen.)	FIFA	Clelland 88'	Stadium: Roazhon Park; Attendance: 13,201; Referee: Lidya Tafesse Abebe (Ethiopia)

19 June 2019 2019 WC Group D	Scotland	3–3	Argentina	Paris
20:00 BST	Little 19'; Beattie 49'; Cuthbert 69'	FIFA	Menéndez 74'; Alexander 79' (o.g.); Bonsegundo 90+4' (pen.)	Stadium: Parc des Princes; Attendance: 28,205; Referee: Ri Hyang-ok (North Korea)

== Deaths ==
- 8 July: Alan Gilzean, 79, Dundee and Scotland forward.
- 14 July: Davie McParland, 83, Partick Thistle winger; Partick Thistle, Queen's Park and Hamilton Academical manager; Celtic assistant manager.
- 21 July: Allan Ball, 75, Queen of the South goalkeeper.
- c.23 July: Jimmy Copeland, 76, Kilmarnock, Dumbarton, Montrose and Clyde forward.
- 10 August: Alan Hercher, 52, Inverness Caledonian Thistle midfielder.
- September: George O'Hara, Dundee and Queen of the South forward.
- 24 September: Jim Brogan, 74, Celtic, Ayr United and Scotland full-back.
- 31 October: Johnny Graham, 73, Third Lanark, Dundee United, Falkirk, Hibernian and Ayr United midfielder.
- 13 November: William Mullan, 90, referee.
- 13 November: David Stewart, 71, Ayr United and Scotland goalkeeper.
- 16 November: Flemming Nielsen, 84, Morton midfielder.
- 19 November: George Yardley, 76, East Fife goalkeeper and forward.
- 22 November: Len Campbell, 71, Dumbarton wing half.
- 1 January: Freddie Glidden, 91, Hearts and Dumbarton defender.
- 24 January: Hugh McIlvanney, 84, journalist.
- 5 February: Joe Fascione, 74, Dundee United winger.
- 9 February: Katharina Lindner, 39, Glasgow City forward.
- 9 February: Ian Ross, 72, Berwick Rangers manager.
- 17 February: Johnny Valentine, 88, Queen's Park, Rangers and St Johnstone defender.
- 4 March: Eric Caldow, 84, Rangers, Stirling Albion and Scotland defender; Stranraer manager.
- 7 March: Bobby Campbell, 77, Greenock Morton, St Mirren and Motherwell inside right.
- 12 April: Ivor Broadis, 96, Queen of the South forward.
- 22 April: Billy McNeill, 79, Celtic and Scotland defender; Clyde, Aberdeen and Celtic manager.
- 29 April: Stevie Chalmers, 83, Dumbarton, Celtic, Morton, Partick Thistle and Scotland forward.
- 13 May: George Smith, 75, referee.
- 26 May: Harry Hood, 74, Clyde, Celtic, Motherwell and Queen of the South forward; Albion Rovers and Queen of the South manager.
- 4 June: Lawrie Leslie, 84, Hibernian, Airdrie and Scotland goalkeeper.
- 17 June: Ian MacFarlane, 86, Aberdeen full-back.
- 19 June: Ernie Collumbine, 80/81, Stenhousemuir, East Stirlingshire, St Johnstone and Clydebank wing-half.
- 24 June: Bobby Brown, 87, Motherwell full-back.
