= Danny Lennon =

Scottish football manager (born 1969)

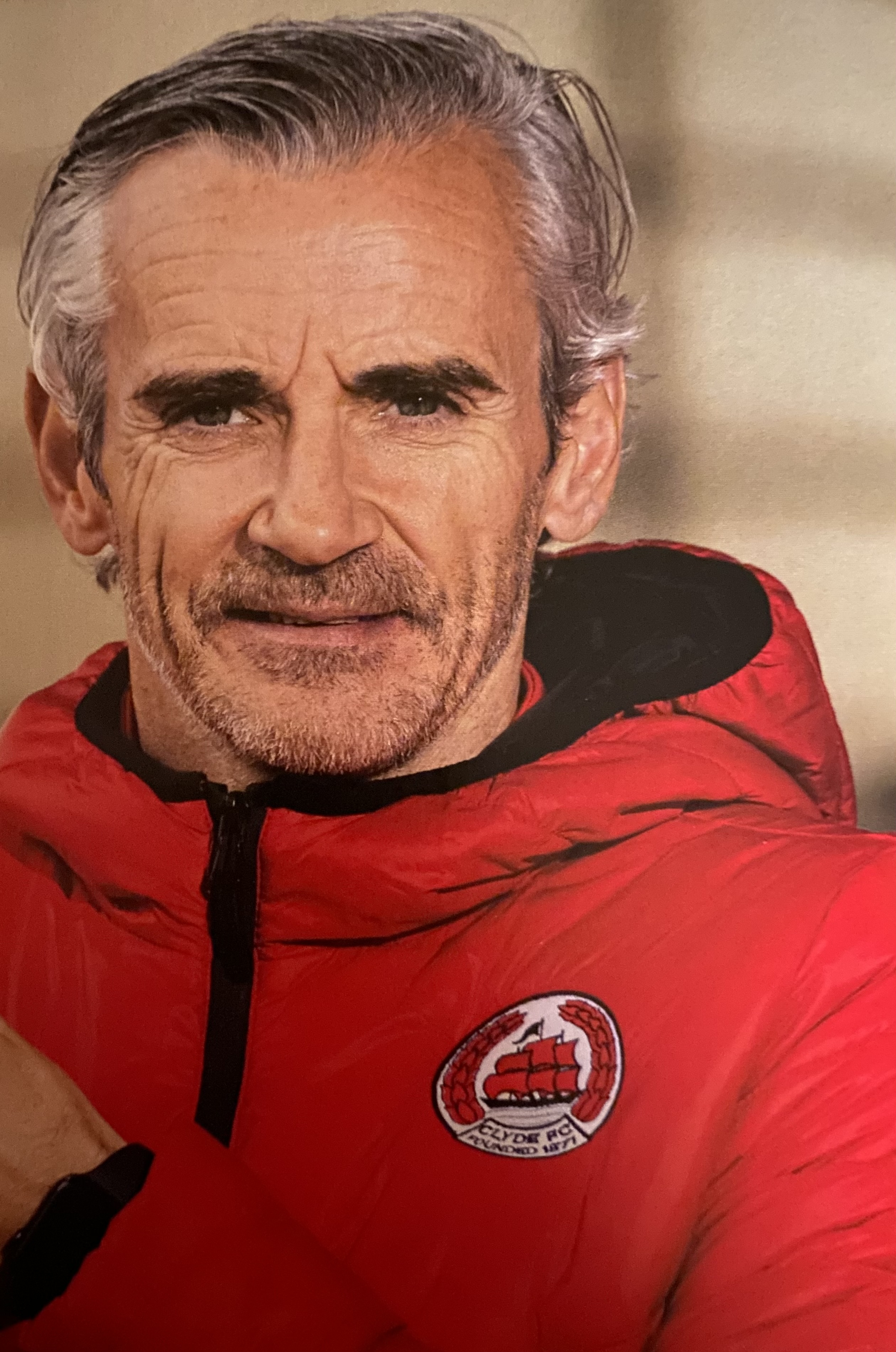
- Lennon as Clyde manager in 2019

Personal information
- Full name: Daniel Joseph Lennon
- Date of birth: 6 April 1969 (age 57)
- Place of birth: Whitburn, Scotland
- Position: Midfielder

Team information
- Current team: Dumbarton (Director of Football)

Youth career
- 1984-1985: Hutchison Vale
- 1985-1987: Hibernian

Senior career*
Years	Team	Apps	(Gls)
1987–1993	Hibernian	37	(2)
1993–1999	Raith Rovers	152	(14)
1999	Ayr United	7	(1)
1999	Ross County	7	(0)
1999–2003	Partick Thistle	98	(12)
2003–2005	Gretna	10	(0)
2006	Workington	0	(0)
2006–2008	Cowdenbeath	18	(0)
Total		330	(29)

International career
1995–1998	Northern Ireland B	4	(0)

Managerial career
- 2008–2010: Cowdenbeath
- 2010–2014: St Mirren
- 2015: Scotland U21 (caretaker)
- 2015: Alloa Athletic
- 2016: Airdrieonians (interim)
- 2017–2022: Clyde
- 2025: Airdrieonians
- 2026: Dumbarton (interim)
- * Club domestic league appearances and goals

Daniel Joseph Lennon (born 6 April 1969) is a Scottish professional football manager and former player who is currently the Director of Football at Scottish League Two club Dumbarton.

In his playing career, Lennon is best known for scoring a free kick for Raith Rovers against Bayern Munich during an UEFA Cup tie in 1995 and winning the Scottish Second and First Division as captain of Partick Thistle in 2001 and 2002.

It was at Raith, where he would also experience international football with Northern Ireland B.

Lennon began his managerial career with Cowdenbeath in June 2008. Having led the Blue Brazil to promotion from the Scottish Third Division to the First Division, he was appointed St Mirren manager in June 2010. He won the 2012–13 Scottish League Cup with the Buddies but his contract was not renewed at the end of the 2013-14 season. After a caretaker spell in charge of the Scotland under-21s, Lennon managed Alloa Athletic from April to December 2015.

Following a stint as acting head coach of Airdrieonians, Lennon was appointed Clyde manager in November 2017, where he remained for five years until October 2022. Under his management, Clyde secured promotion to Scottish League One in the 2018-19 season.

Lennon returned to Airdrieonians for a second spell as manager from August to October 2025. He was appointed Director of Football at Dumbarton in September 2026 before becoming interim manager from October to November that year.

== Playing career ==
=== Club ===
Lennon began his career as a youth player at Hutchison Vale before signing his first professional contract at Hibernian. He then signed for Raith Rovers for £30,000 in 1993. At Raith, he was part of the squad that won the Scottish League Cup in 1994, but he missed the final due to injury. Raith qualified for the UEFA Cup thanks to winning the League Cup.

Lennon scored in Raith's second leg tie against Bayern Munich, which briefly gave them the lead at the Munich Olympic Stadium. In 2023, Lennon was inducted into the Raith Rovers Hall of Fame.

After leaving Raith in 1999, he played for Ayr United, Ross County, Partick Thistle, where he won two league titles, Gretna, Workington and Cowdenbeath. At Gretna, Lennon was also appointed head of youth development.

On 18 November 2011, Lennon was inducted into Partick Thistle's Hall of Fame, receiving legendary status.

At the age of 50, Lennon briefly came out of retirement in 2019, 11 years after he last played, as a substitute for Clyde against Celtic B in the Glasgow Cup.

=== International ===
During his time at Raith Rovers, Lennon won four caps for Northern Ireland B. Lennon was eligible to play for Northern Ireland through his grandmother.

== Managerial career ==
=== Cowdenbeath ===
Lennon was appointed assistant manager to Brian Welsh at Cowdenbeath on 10 November 2006. When Welsh departed the club, Lennon was announced as his successor on 11 June 2008. He won his first match as a manager with a 2–0 victory against Elgin City in the Scottish Challenge Cup.

In his first season, Lennon led the Blue Brazil to second place in the 2008-09 Scottish Third Division only to lose the promotion play-off final to Stenhousemuir on penalties. However, as a result of Livingston's demotion, the club were promoted to the Scottish Second Division.

After their unprecedented promotion to the third tier and amid financial difficulties, Lennon guided the club to the Scottish First Division for the first time in 16 years with victory over Brechin City in the play-off final.

=== St Mirren ===
Lennon was appointed manager of Scottish Premier League club St Mirren on 7 June 2010, signing a two-year contract to succeed Gus MacPherson. Lennon turned down an interview with Kilmarnock to accept the role.

Lennon secured the first win of his tenure with a 1–0 win over Hibernian on 29 August 2010. The Buddies finished the 2010-11 season in 11th place, managing to avoid relegation.

Over the summer, Lennon decided to make wholesale changes across the club. Lennon's signings included Scottish internationals, Gary Teale from Sheffield Wednesday and Steven Thompson from Burnley while assistant manager Iain Jenkins was replaced by Tommy Craig.

St Mirren started the 2011-12 season by defeating local rivals Greenock Morton 4–2 in the Renfrewshire Cup final and Aberdeen in the first home league match. On 23 November 2011, Lennon agreed a new contract with St Mirren until the summer of 2014. The Buddies were fifth in the league table amid speculation that Lennon was shortlisted for the Hibernian vacancy.

The following season, Lennon led the Buddies to their first-ever Scottish League Cup triumph in a 3–2 win over Heart of Midlothian. It was the club's first major silverware since winning the Scottish Cup in 1987, and the fourth major honour in their history.

After the 2013–14 season was completed, St Mirren decided not to offer Lennon a new contract. During his time in Paisley, the club achieved their highest league position in over 20 years, finishing eighth in the 2011-12 and 2013-14 seasons. John McGinn and Kenny McLean also made their professional debuts during Lennon's tenure.

In August 2014, three months after departing St Mirren, Lennon declared interest in becoming Ross County manager.

In October 2017, Lennon was inducted into the club's Hall of Fame, cementing his status as a St Mirren legend.

=== Scotland Under 21s ===
On 18 February 2015, Lennon was appointed caretaker manager of the Scotland national under-21 football team replacing Billy Stark. He took charge of one friendly match, a 2–1 victory against Hungary with both goals scored by debutant Lawrence Shankland.

=== Alloa Athletic ===
Lennon was appointed manager of Alloa Athletic on 7 April 2015, succeeding Barry Smith on a one-year deal with five matches of the 2014–15 season remaining.

Lennon would lead the Wasps to a historic third consecutive season in the Scottish Championship with victory against Forfar Athletic in the play-off final. However, after five points from the first 16 games of the 2015-16 season, Lennon resigned on 7 December 2015.

=== Airdrieonians ===
In March 2016, Airdrieonians manager Eddie Wolecki Black suffered a stroke during a Scottish League One match against Cowdenbeath.

To allow Wolecki Black to recover, on 10 March, Lennon was appointed acting head coach on an interim basis until the end of the 2015–16 season, leading the club to fifth place, a point below the promotion play-offs.

=== Clyde ===
Lennon returned to management with Scottish League Two club Clyde on 13 November 2017, after the departure of Jim Chapman. Prior to joining Clyde, Lennon was reportedly a frontrunner for the managerial post at Inverness Caledonian Thistle.

The Bully Wee's results improved in the first months of Lennon's tenure, with the club climbing from eighth position to finish the 2017-18 season in fifth place, three points behind the promotion play-offs.

On 7 May 2019, Lennon agreed terms to remain as Clyde manager for at least an additional two years. This was later extended to the end of the 2021–22 season after the club rejected an approach from Partick Thistle, who had identified Lennon as a candidate for their managerial vacancy.

He led the Bully Wee to Scottish League One on 18 May 2019, after beating Annan Athletic to win the play-off final, thus ending their nine-year exile in the bottom tier. This led to Lennon receiving the SPFL League Two Manager of the Season award. The 2018-19 season also saw Lennon awarded SPFL League Two Manager of the Month on three occasions.

In their first season back in the third tier, Clyde were seventh in League One when the 2019-20 season was suspended after 28 matches due to the COVID-19 pandemic.

On 8 April 2022, Lennon signed a new two-year contract until May 2024 as Clyde went on to secure a fourth consecutive season in League One.

Despite, achieving Clyde’s best start to a league campaign in 11 years during the 2022-23 season, it was confirmed on 31 October, that Lennon had departed the club after a nine-match winless run. The announcement came a week after he was placed on 'paid authorised absence'.

Having spent five years at the club, Lennon holds the distinction of Clyde's longest-serving manager in over 30 years.

=== Return to Airdrieonians ===
Lennon returned to Airdrieonians, now in the Scottish Championship, as successor to Rhys McCabe on 27 August 2025. He left the club on 22 October, after eight matches in charge.

=== Dumbarton ===
On 3 September 2026, Lennon was appointed Director of Football at Scottish League Two club Dumbarton. Lennon was named interim manager on 14 October following the departure of Frank McKeown and remained in charge until the appointment of Martin Fellowes.

== Managerial statistics ==
As of 18 November 2026

Team	From	To	Record				
Team	From	To	G	W	D	L	Win %
Cowdenbeath	11 June 2008	7 June 2010	91	41	26	24	45.05
St Mirren	7 June 2010	12 May 2014	180	50	56	74	27.78
Scotland U21 (caretaker)	18 February 2015	7 April 2015	1	1	0	0	100.00
Alloa Athletic	7 April 2015	7 December 2015	27	6	3	18	22.22
Airdrieonians (interim)	10 March 2016	30 April 2016	8	3	2	3	37.50
Clyde	13 November 2017	25 October 2022	198	79	37	82	39.90
Airdrieonians	27 August 2025	22 October 2025	8	0	2	6	0.00
Dumbarton (interim)	14 October 2026	18 November 2026	5	2	1	2	40.00
Total			518	182	127	209	35.14

- Lennon's announcement as Alloa Athletic manager didn't take effect until 9 April 2015. The intervening match against Heart of Midlothian on 8 April was taken by caretaker manager Paddy Connolly.

== Honours and achievements ==
=== Player ===
Raith Rovers

- Scottish First Division winners (1): 1994–95
- Scottish League Cup winners (1): 1994–95

Partick Thistle

- Scottish First Division winners (1): 2001–02
- Scottish Second Division winners (1): 2000–01

=== Manager ===
Cowdenbeath

- Scottish First Division play-off winners (1): 2009–10
- Scottish Second Division promotion (1): 2008–09

St Mirren

- Scottish League Cup winners (1): 2012–13
- Renfrewshire Cup winners (3): 2010–11, 2011–12, 2012–13

Alloa Athletic

- Scottish Championship play-off winners (1): 2014–15

Clyde

- Scottish League One play-off winners (1): 2018–19
- North Lanarkshire Cup winners (2): 2020–21, 2021–22

=== Individual ===
- Third Division Manager of the Month: 2008-09 (1): January 2009
- Second Division Manager of the Month: 2009-10 (3): October 2009, November 2009, March 2010
- SPFL League Two Manager of the Month: 2017-18 (1): March 2018
- SPFL League Two Manager of the Month: 2018–19 (3): November 2018, January 2019, April 2019
- SPFL League Two Manager of the Season: 2018–19
