= 1975 Scottish Cup final =

1975 Scottish Cup Final
- Event: 1974–75 Scottish Cup
Celtic	Airdrieonians
3	1
- Date: 3 May 1975
- Venue: Hampden Park, Glasgow
- Referee: Ian Foote
- Attendance: 75,457

The 1975 Scottish Cup Final was played on 3 May 1975 at Hampden Park in Glasgow and was the 90th final of the Scottish Cup. Celtic and Airdrieonians contested the match: Celtic won the match 3–1 with goals from Paul Wilson (two) and a Pat McCluskey penalty; Kevin McCann scoring Airdrieonians’ goal.

The game was Celtic's seventh successive appearance in the final, it was also Celtic's 25th Scottish Cup. Airdrieonians played in their second Scottish Cup final, 51 years after they won the cup.

After the match, Celtic captain Billy McNeill announced his retirement.

== Match details ==
3 May 1975

Celtic	3–1	Airdrieonians
Wilson 14', 43'; McCluskey 58'		McCann 42'

Hampden Park, Glasgow
Attendance: 75,457
Referee: Ian Foote

=== Teams ===
CELTIC:
GK	(England) Peter Latchford
DF	(Scotland) Danny McGrain
DF	(Scotland) Billy McNeill (c)
DF	(Scotland) Pat McCluskey
DF	(Scotland) Andy Lynch
MF	(Scotland) Paul Wilson
MF	(Scotland) Steve Murray
MF	(Scotland) Ronnie Glavin
MF	(Scotland) Bobby Lennox
FW	(Scotland) Kenny Dalglish
FW	(Scotland) Harry Hood
Substitutes:
MF	(Scotland) Tommy Callaghan
DF	(Scotland) Roddie MacDonald
Manager:
(Scotland) Jock Stein

AIRDRIEONIANS:
GK	(Scotland) Dave McWilliams
DF	(Scotland) Paul Jonquin
DF	(Scotland) John Menzies
DF	(Scotland) Jim Black
DF	(Scotland) Mark Cowan
MF	(Scotland) Kevin McCann
MF	(Scotland) Derek Whiteford (c)
MF	(Scotland) John Lapsley	Substituted off
MF	(Scotland) Billy Wilson
FW	(Scotland) Tommy Walker
FW	(Scotland) Willie McCulloch	Substituted off
Substitutes:
MF	(Scotland) Tommy Reynolds	Substituted on
DF	(Scotland) Jim March	Substituted on
Manager:
(Scotland) Ian McMillan
