= William McCulloch =

William McCulloch may refer to:

- William McCulloch (political officer) (1816–1885), British political officer in India, especially Manipur
- William McCulloch (Australian politician) (1832–1909)
- Bill McCulloch (1872-1951), Australian rules footballer
- William Moore McCulloch (1901–1980), American politician (US Representative from Ohio)
- Billy McCulloch (1922-1961), Scottish footballer
- Willie McCulloch (footballer, born 1927) (1927–2013), Scottish footballer
- Willie McCulloch (footballer, born 1948) (1948–2023), Scottish footballer
- Willie McCulloch (born 1973), Scottish footballer
