= Paul Wilson (footballer, born 1950) =

Footballer (1950–2017)

Personal information
- Date of birth: 23 November 1950
- Place of birth: Bangalore, India
- Date of death: 18 September 2017 (aged 66)
- Height: 1.70 m (5 ft 7 in)
- Position: Forward

Youth career
- Drumchapel Amateurs

Senior career*
Years	Team	Apps	(Gls)
1967–1978	Celtic	131	(30)
1967–1970	→ Maryhill (loan)		
1978–1979	Motherwell	21	(1)
1979–1980	Partick Thistle	10	(0)
1980–1982	Blantyre Celtic		
Total		160	(31)

International career
1975	Scotland	1	(0)
- * Club domestic league appearances and goals

Paul Wilson (23 November 1950 – 18 September 2017) was a professional footballer, who played as a forward for Celtic, Motherwell and Partick Thistle. His football career peaked in season 1974–75 after being moved to play as a striker when he scored 29 goals for Celtic, including two in that season's Scottish Cup final win.

Born in India, he played once for Scotland in 1975. This made him the only non-white player to represent the full Scotland team in the 20th century, and the first footballer with Asian origins to represent any of Scotland, England, Wales and Northern Ireland at senior level. Following his mother's death, his enthusiasm for football diminished. He left the professional game at the age of 29.

== Early years ==
Wilson was born in Bangalore, India. His Scottish father was stationed there with the Royal Air Force. His mother was Indian of Dutch-Portuguese origin. The family moved to Scotland when Wilson was one year old, living first in the Dennistoun district of Glasgow then in the town of Milngavie in the northern outskirts.

== Club career ==
=== Celtic ===
Celtic manager Jock Stein signed Wilson for the club in 1967 and immediately farmed him out to Junior club, Maryhill, to gain experience before returning to Celtic. Wilson was part of a group of young players named the Quality Street Gang by the Scottish media. He was one of many in that group who gradually replaced Celtic's Lisbon Lions team which had won the 1967 European Cup Final. Wilson's senior debut was in a European Cup 9–0 win at Celtic Park against KPV Kokkola in 1970 in which he scored twice.

Wilson was a quick footballer able to shoot with either foot. He was largely deployed by Stein on the wing where he felt Wilson's pace would be useful. Wilson disliked playing wide, preferring to play more centrally. He had dark skin tone and received racist abuse in his football career during Old Firm games against rivals Rangers

Wilson became a first team regular in August 1973. He ended season 1973–74 in Scottish football with a league winners' medal but did not feature in the squad for the 1974 Scottish Cup Final, a 3–0 win over Dundee United.

Stein moved the fast and elegant Wilson to play up front for the 1974–75 season where he outscored his friend and strike partner, Kenny Dalglish, with 29 goals. This culminated with Wilson scoring two headed goals in the 3–1 victory over Airdrie in the 1975 Scottish Cup Final. This was also the season he was selected to play for Scotland.

Wilson's mother died in the week leading up to the final against Airdrie. He later stated his mother's death was the source of his waning enthusiasm for football. This was not helped by a niggling injury requiring cortisone injections. Wilson did though collect a second championship winning medal in 1976–77 when he had been a regular until Alfie Conn joined in March that season. Wilson remained at Celtic until 1978 when he was out of favour under Billy McNeill's management. At Celtic, he made 226 appearances in all competitions, scoring 62 goals including six in matches against Rangers.

=== Later club career ===
Next Wilson moved to Motherwell for one season. He then finished his senior career at the end of the 1980 season with Partick Thistle at the age of 29.

After his spell at Thistle, he was tempted into junior football by ex-Celtic teammate Jimmy Johnstone with Blantyre Celtic, winning a junior international cap.

== International career ==
Wilson gained one international cap for Scotland. On 5 February 1975, Willie Ormond sent him on as a 75th-minute substitute for Kenny Burns in a European Championship qualifier. The 1–1 draw was against Spain in Valencia in which Joe Jordan had put the Scots ahead. Wilson remarked, "I nearly scored but their keeper just got his hands to my effort. I was as sick as a dog. I was so proud to get my one cap."

Andrew Watson collected three full caps in the 1880s. Wilson was the only non-white of the 727 players to be selected by the full Scotland international team during the 20th century. The book "'Race', Sport and British Society" notes Wilson's Scotland outing was a full three years before Viv Anderson became the first black player to play for England: "Anderson's selection was heralded as a significant step forward for black representation in football; Wilson's selection for Scotland was ignored," wrote the authors. Wilson was the first player of Asian descent to have represented any of Scotland, England, Wales and Northern Ireland at senior level. The third non-white player to be capped by Scotland was Nigel Quashie in 2004.

== Death ==
Wilson died on 18 September 2017, at the age of 66.

== Honours ==
Celtic

- Scottish Football League: 1973–74, 1976–77
- Scottish Cup: 1974–75, 1976–77
- Scottish League Cup: 1974–75; runner-up 1973–74, 1975–76, 1976–77, 1977–78
- Glasgow Cup: 1974–75 (shared)
- Drybrough Cup: 1974–75

== See also ==
- List of Scotland international footballers born outside Scotland
- British Asians in association football
