= Jim Ballantyne =

British sports executive

Jim Ballantyne was the chairman of Scottish association football team Airdrieonians, from 2002 until June 2015 and from June 2017 until Jan 2018. He also served as president of the Scottish Football League, and served on the board of the Scottish Football Association.

Ballantyne bought out Clydebank and renamed the club as Airdrie United in 2002. This allowed Airdrie United to take Clydebank's place in the Scottish Second Division. The motivation behind the move was to create a replacement team for the original Airdrieonians club, who had gone out of business earlier that year due to crippling debts. Ballantyne had first attempted to gain entry to the Scottish Football League by applying for the place created when the original Airdrieonians closed, but Gretna were accepted instead.

Ballantyne sold control of Airdrieonians to west of Scotland businessman Tom Wotherspoon in June 2015 and took up the role of vice-chairman at the club.

In June 2017 Tom Wotherspoon stepped down as chairman and director of Airdrie FC with Ballantyne taking up his previous role as chairman until Jan 2018 when the club was sold to a consortium of local businessmen.
