= 2018–19 Lowland Football League =

Lowland League
- Season: 2018–19
- Dates: 27 July 2018 – 20 April 2019
- Champions: East Kilbride
- Relegated: Whitehill Welfare
- Matches: 210
- Goals: 714 (3.4 per match)
- Top goalscorer: Craig Malcolm (East Kilbride) (25 goals)
- Biggest home win: The Spartans 6–0 Vale of Leithen (7 December 2018); Gala Fairydean Rovers 6–0 Vale of Leithen (29 December 2018)
- Biggest away win: Whitehill Welfare 0–6 Kelty Hearts (31 July 2018); Gretna 2008 0–6 Civil Service Strollers (8 December 2018); Vale of Leithen 0–6 Edinburgh University (13 April 2019)
- Highest scoring: Vale of Leithen 5–4 Edusport Academy (5 January 2019)
- Longest winning run: 14 matches: East Kilbride
- Longest unbeaten run: 19 matches: BSC Glasgow
- Longest winless run: 20 matches: Whitehill Welfare
- Longest losing run: 6 matches: Whitehill Welfare

The 2018–19 Scottish Lowland Football League (known as the Geosonic Lowland League for sponsorship reasons) was the 6th season of the Lowland Football League, the fifth tier of the Scottish football pyramid system. The season began on 28 July 2018 and ended on 20 April 2019. The Spartans were the defending champions.

East of Scotland League champions Kelty Hearts joined the league after becoming the first club to gain promotion via the Lowland League play-off, thanks to their win against South of Scotland League winners Threave Rovers at the end of the previous season.

Selkirk resigned at the end of August after fulfilling three league games, reducing the number of clubs to 15. Their league defeats to East Kilbride (10–0), Civil Service Strollers (0–5) and Gretna 2008 (0–8) were expunged.

East Kilbride won their second league title on 26 March 2019 thanks to a 2–1 win over The Spartans at K-Park, with three matches still to play. They faced the winners of the 2018–19 Highland Football League (Cove Rangers) in the Pyramid play-off, losing 5-1 on aggregate.

== Teams ==
Location of teams in 2018–19 Scottish Lowland Football League

The following teams have changed division since the 2017–18 season.

=== To Lowland League ===
Promoted from East of Scotland League

- Kelty Hearts

=== From Lowland League ===
Relegated to East of Scotland League

- Hawick Royal Albert

=== Stadia and locations ===
Team	Location	Stadium	Capacity	Seats	Floodlit
BSC Glasgow	Alloa	Recreation Park	3,100	919	Yes
Civil Service Strollers	Edinburgh	Christie Gillies Park	1,569	100	No
Cumbernauld Colts	Cumbernauld	Broadwood Stadium	7,936	7,936	Yes
Dalbeattie Star	Dalbeattie	Islecroft Stadium	4,000	250	Yes
East Kilbride	East Kilbride	K Park	660	400	Yes
East Stirlingshire	Falkirk	Falkirk Stadium	7,937	7,937	Yes
Edinburgh University	Edinburgh	New Peffermill Stadium	1,100	100	Yes
Edusport Academy	Annan	Galabank	2,504	500	Yes
Gala Fairydean Rovers	Galashiels	3G Arena, Netherdale	5,500	495	Yes
Gretna 2008	Gretna	Raydale Park	3,000	1,318	Yes
Kelty Hearts	Kelty	New Central Park	3,000	350	Yes
Selkirk	Selkirk	Yarrow Park	1,000	100	No
The Spartans	Edinburgh	Ainslie Park	3,000	504	Yes
Stirling University	Stirling	Forthbank Stadium	3,808	2,508	Yes
Vale of Leithen	Innerleithen	Victoria Park	1,500	0	No
Whitehill Welfare	Rosewell	Ferguson Park	4,000	150	No

== League table ==
Pos	Team	Pld	W	D	L	GF	GA	GD	Pts	Promotion, qualification or relegation
1	East Kilbride (C)	28	23	3	2	66	12	+54	72	Qualification for the Pyramid play-off
2	BSC Glasgow	28	18	7	3	67	29	+38	61	
3	Kelty Hearts	28	16	6	6	61	32	+29	54	
4	The Spartans	28	14	9	5	63	31	+32	51	
5	Civil Service Strollers	28	15	4	9	51	38	+13	49	
6	East Stirlingshire	28	11	6	11	57	47	+10	39	
7	Cumbernauld Colts	28	11	6	11	40	47	−7	39	
8	Gala Fairydean Rovers	28	10	4	14	43	48	−5	34	
9	Edusport Academy	28	9	6	13	43	52	−9	33	
10	Stirling University	28	7	10	11	43	50	−7	31	
11	Edinburgh University	28	7	9	12	38	54	−16	30	
12	Gretna 2008	28	9	2	17	42	67	−25	29	
13	Vale of Leithen	28	8	5	15	43	74	−31	29	
14	Dalbeattie Star	28	5	7	16	33	63	−30	22	
15	Whitehill Welfare (R)	28	2	6	20	24	70	−46	12	Relegation to East of Scotland League
16	Selkirk (Note: After failing to fulfil three fixtures, Selkirk resigned from the league on 28 August 2018 due to insurmountable difficulties. Selkirk's record was expunged following a meeting of the Lowland League board on 3 September 2018.)	0	0	0	0	0	0	0	0	Club resigned, record expunged

Source: SLFL BBC Sport Soccerway
Rules for classification: 1) Points; 2) Goal difference; 3) Number of goals scored
(C) Champions; (R) Relegated

== Results ==
Home \ Away	BSC	CSS	CUM	DBS	EKB	EST	EDU	EDA	GFR	G08	KEL	SEL	SPA	SLU	VOL	WHW
BSC Glasgow		1–1	2–2	4–1	0–3	2–0	5–0	2–2	1–0	3–0	2–3		3–2	6–1	4–0	5–0
Civil Service Strollers	1–2		1–0	1–0	3–1	3–4	5–0	1–0	2–2	2–1	0–1		0–2	1–0	0–0	3–1
Cumbernauld Colts	1–2	3–0		3–0	0–3	3–2	1–1	2–2	1–2	1–4	3–2		0–2	1–0	2–1	2–0
Dalbeattie Star	2–1	3–4	0–1		1–3	2–2	2–3	1–2	4–2	2–1	2–1		2–2	0–0	1–1	1–1
East Kilbride	1–2	2–1	0–0	3–0		2–0	3–0	2–0	3–0	5–0	4–0		2–1	2–0	5–1	3–1
East Stirlingshire	1–1	3–4	3–1	2–0	0–2		1–2	1–2	0–3	2–0	3–3		1–1	2–2	2–3	4–0
Edinburgh University	2–2	1–3	1–0	0–1	1–1	1–2		0–2	0–1	3–2	1–3		1–1	1–5	4–3	0–1
Edusport Academy	2–2	2–0	2–3	4–0	0–1	1–3	2–2		1–2	1–5	0–1		0–5	2–4	2–0	4–1
Gala Fairydean Rovers	1–3	0–2	1–2	3–2	0–2	2–2	1–1	0–2		0–2	0–1		3–1	3–1	6–0	3–1
Gretna 2008	0–0	0–6	1–3	5–2	0–2	1–2	0–3	2–1	2–4		1–3		0–4	1–1	4–1	2–1
Kelty Hearts	0–3	4–0	1–0	2–2	0–3	2–0	2–2	5–0	2–0	4–0			1–1	2–2	0–0	6–1
Selkirk																
The Spartans	0–1	1–1	6–2	4–0	0–0	4–3	3–0	1–1	2–0	2–1	2–1			2–2	6–0	1–0
Stirling University	2–3	2–0	1–1	2–2	1–4	0–6	1–1	1–1	3–1	1–2	0–1		4–2		2–2	2–0
Vale of Leithen	0–3	1–4	5–0	3–0	0–1	0–3	0–6	5–4	4–2	6–1	0–4		1–4	1–0		2–2
Whitehill Welfare	1–2	1–2	2–2	3–0	0–3	0–3	2–2	0–1	1–1	2–4	0–6		1–1	0–3	2–3	

Updated to match(es) played on 20 April 2019. Source: SLFL
Legend: Blue = home team win; Yellow = draw; Red = away team win.

== Lowland League play-off ==
A play-off was due to take place between the winners of the 2018–19 East of Scotland Football League and the 2018–19 South of Scotland Football League. However South of Scotland League champions Stranraer reserves were ineligible for promotion due to being a reserve team.

Initially, the winners of the East of Scotland League (Bonnyrigg Rose Athletic) did not meet the required licensing criteria for promotion at the end of the season. However they were eventually awarded their SFA licence on 14 June 2019 and were confirmed as promoted to the 2019–20 Lowland Football League on the same day.
