= 2018–19 South of Scotland Football League =

South of Scotland Football League
- Season: 2018–19
- Dates: 27 July 2018 – 10 May 2019
- Champions: Stranraer reserves
- Matches: 240
- Goals: 1,159 (4.83 per match)
- Biggest home win: Mid-Annandale 12–0 Newton Stewart (1 August 2018)
- Biggest away win: Annan Athletic reserves 1–10 Mid-Annandale (27 October 2018)
- Highest scoring: Bonnyton Thistle 11–3 Creetown (12 January 2019)
- All statistics correct as of 10 May 2018.

The 2018–19 South of Scotland Football League was the 73rd season of the South of Scotland Football League, and the 5th season as the sixth tier of the Scottish football pyramid system. The season began on 28 July 2018 and ended on 10 May 2019. Threave Rovers are the reigning champions.

The league increased to a 16 team division as Wigtown & Bladnoch returned to the league after a one season absence.

Stranraer reserves won the league on 10 April 2019. As a reserve team they are ineligible for promotion to the Lowland League.

== Teams ==
Location of teams in 2018–19 South of Scotland Football League within Dumfries & Galloway

The following teams changed division after the 2017–18 season.

=== To South of Scotland League ===
Returned from abeyance

- Wigtown and Bladnoch

Team	Location	Home ground	Capacity	Seats	Floodlit
Abbey Vale	New Abbey	Maryfield Park	1,000	0	No
Annan Athletic reserves	Annan	Galabank	2,504	500	Yes
Bonnyton Thistle	Kilmarnock	Bonnyton Park	1,000	100	Yes
Creetown	Creetown	Castlecary Park	1,000	0	No
Dumfries YMCA	Dumfries	Kingholm Park	500	0	Yes
Heston Rovers	Dumfries	Palmerston Park	8,690	3,377	Yes
Lochar Thistle	Dumfries	Maxwelltown High School	1,000	0	No
Lochmaben	Lockerbie	New King Edward Park	1,000	0	No
Mid-Annandale	Lockerbie	New King Edward Park	1,000	0	No
Newton Stewart ^{[SFA]}	Newton Stewart	Blairmount Park	1,500	0	Yes
Nithsdale Wanderers	Sanquhar	Lorimer Park	1,000	0	Yes
St Cuthbert Wanderers ^{[SFA]}	Kirkcudbright	St Mary's Park	2,000	0	Yes
Stranraer reserves	Stranraer	Stair Park	4,178	1,830	Yes
Threave Rovers ^{[SFA]}	Castle Douglas	Meadow Park	1,500		Yes
Upper Annandale	Moffat	Moffat Academy	1,000	0	No
Wigtown & Bladnoch ^{[SFA]}	Wigtown	Trammondford Park	888	0	No

^{SFA} Club has an SFA Licence (as of 20 December 2017) and are eligible to participate in the Lowland League promotion play-off should they win the league.

== League table ==
Pos	Team	Pld	W	D	L	GF	GA	GD	Pts	Qualification
1	Stranraer reserves (C)	30	29	1	0	131	24	+107	88	Ineligible for promotion to the Lowland League
2	Bonnyton Thistle	30	22	4	4	120	39	+81	70	
3	Nithsdale Wanderers	30	19	3	8	100	72	+28	60	
4	Abbey Vale	30	17	6	7	100	54	+46	57	
5	Upper Annandale	30	17	6	7	72	53	+19	57	
6	Mid-Annandale	30	17	4	9	105	50	+55	55	
7	Lochar Thistle	30	16	5	9	71	47	+24	53	
8	Heston Rovers	30	15	3	12	66	48	+18	48	
9	Threave Rovers	30	14	3	13	79	54	+25	45	
10	St Cuthbert Wanderers	30	13	6	11	79	57	+22	45	
11	Lochmaben	30	8	5	17	59	87	−28	29	
12	Wigtown & Bladnoch	30	8	3	19	48	94	−46	27	
13	Newton Stewart	30	6	4	20	38	115	−77	22	
14	Creetown	30	4	7	19	36	87	−51	19	
15	Dumfries YMCA	30	3	2	25	29	125	−96	11	
16	Annan Athletic reserves	30	0	2	28	26	153	−127	2	

Source: South of Scotland Football League
Rules for classification: 1) Points; 2) Goal difference; 3) Number of goals scored
(C) Champions
