= John Lapsley (footballer) =

Scottish footballer

Personal information
- Date of birth: 24 November 1951 (age 74)
- Place of birth: Edinburgh, Scotland
- Position: Left-back

Youth career
- Linlithgow Rose

Senior career*
Years	Team	Apps	(Gls)
1973–1980	Airdrieonians	202	(21)
1980–1982	Partick Thistle	51	(0)
1982–1983	Ayr United	5	(0)
1983	East Stirlingshire	3	(0)
1983	Stenhousemuir	1	(0)
1983	Cowdenbeath	1	(0)
1983	Hamilton Academical	3	(0)
1983	Falkirk	2	(0)
1983–1984	Dunfermline Athletic	17	(1)
1984–1986	Brechin City	6	(0)
Total		291	(22)
- * Club domestic league appearances and goals

John Lapsley (born 24 November 1951) is a Scottish former footballer, who played for several Scottish Football League clubs in the 1970s and 1980s. Most of his league appearances were with the Airdrieonians, whom he played for in the 1975 Scottish Cup Final.
