= Jim March =

Scottish footballer

Personal information
- Date of birth: 21 April 1954 (age 72)
- Place of birth: Glasgow, Scotland
- Position: Defender

Youth career
- St Roch's

Senior career*
Years	Team	Apps	(Gls)
1973–1984	Airdrieonians	224	(18)
1984–1986	Ayr United	42	(0)
- Pollok
Total		266	(18)
- * Club domestic league appearances and goals

Jim March (born 21 April 1954) is a Scottish former footballer, who played for Airdrieonians and Ayr United in the Scottish Football League during the 1970s and 1980s. Most of his league appearances were made with Airdrieonians, who he played for in the 1975 Scottish Cup Final.
