= 2018–19 Highland Football League =

Breedon Highland League
- Season: 2018–19
- Dates: 28 July 2018 – 27 April 2019
- Champions: Cove Rangers
- Promoted: Cove Rangers
- Matches: 306
- Goals: 1,260 (4.12 per match)
- Biggest home win: Fraserburgh 13–0 Fort William (10 November 2018); Formartine United 14–1 Fort William (5 January 2019)
- Biggest away win: Fort William 0–11 Brora Rangers (27 February 2019)
- Highest scoring: Formartine United 14–1 Fort William (5 January 2019)
- Longest winning run: 16 matches: Cove Rangers
- Longest unbeaten run: 16 matches: Cove Rangers
- Longest winless run: 34 matches: Fort William

The 2018–19 Highland Football League (known as the Breedon Highland League for sponsorship reasons) was the 116th season of the Highland Football League, and the fifth season as the fifth-tier of the Scottish football pyramid system. The season began on 28 July 2018 and ended on 27 April 2019.

Cove Rangers were the defending champions and retained the title on 13 April 2019 with one match still to play, after a 1–0 win away to Forres Mechanics.

They faced the winners of the 2018–19 Lowland Football League (East Kilbride) in the Pyramid play-off, winning 5–1 on aggregate. Cove then defeated Berwick Rangers 7–0 on aggregate in the League Two play-off final to gain a place in Scottish League Two.

== Teams ==
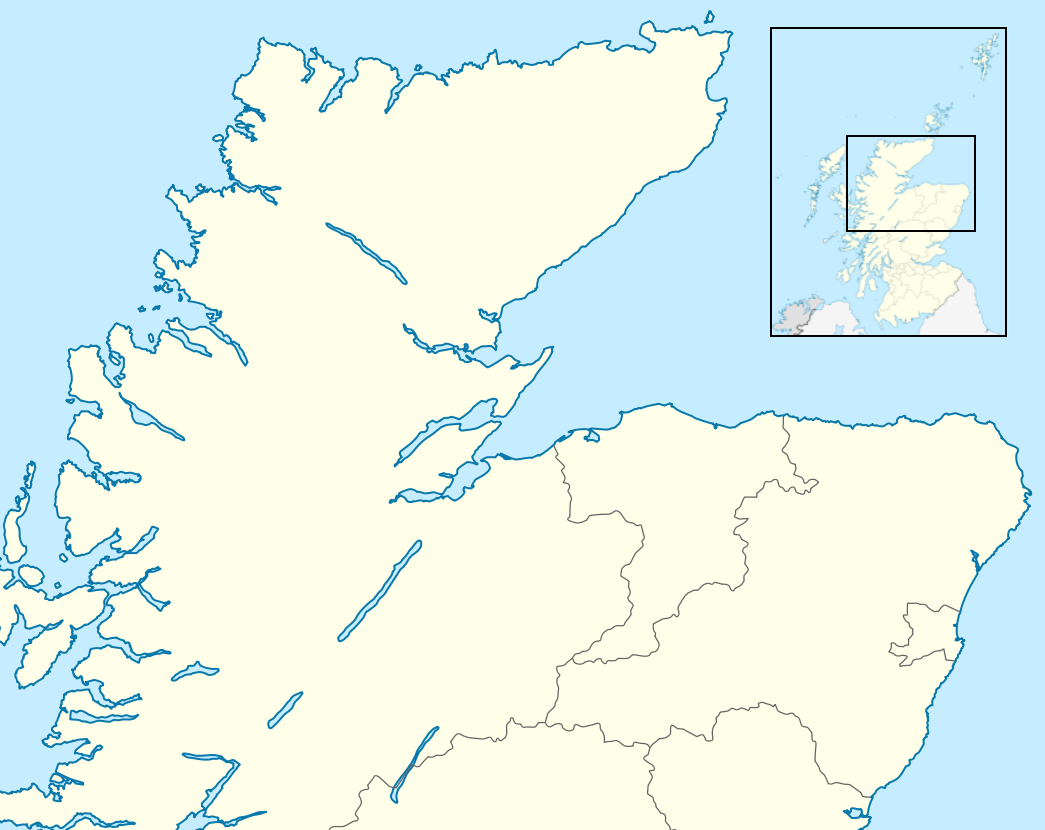
Location of teams in 2018–19 Highland Football League

Fort William had given notice to withdraw from the league after years of struggling, but new investors came forward and the club opted to continue for at least another season. Champions Cove Rangers failed to gain promotion in the play-offs, so the league membership remained unchanged.

=== Stadia and locations ===
All grounds are equipped with floodlights as required by league regulations.

Team	Location	Stadium	Capacity	Seats
Brora Rangers	Brora	Dudgeon Park	4,000	200
Buckie Thistle	Buckie	Victoria Park	5,000	400
Clachnacuddin	Inverness	Grant Street Park	3,000	154
Cove Rangers	Aberdeen	Balmoral Stadium	2,602	370
Deveronvale	Banff	Princess Royal Park	2,600	360
Forres Mechanics	Forres	Mosset Park	2,700	502
Formartine United	Pitmedden	North Lodge Park	2,500	300
Fort William	Fort William	Claggan Park	4,000	400
Fraserburgh	Fraserburgh	Bellslea Park	3,000	480
Huntly	Huntly	Christie Park	2,200	270
Inverurie Loco Works	Inverurie	Harlaw Park	2,500	250
Keith	Keith	Kynoch Park	4,000	370
Lossiemouth	Lossiemouth	Grant Park	3,250	250
Nairn County	Nairn	Station Park	2,250	250
Rothes	Rothes	Mackessack Park	2,700	184
Strathspey Thistle	Grantown-on-Spey	Seafield Park	1,600	150
Turriff United	Turriff	The Haughs	2,135	135
Wick Academy	Wick	Harmsworth Park	2,412	102

== League table ==
Pos	Team	Pld	W	D	L	GF	GA	GD	Pts	Promotion or qualification
1	Cove Rangers (C, O, P)	34	30	3	1	100	12	+88	93	Qualification for the Pyramid play-off
2	Brora Rangers	34	27	4	3	99	12	+87	85	
3	Fraserburgh	34	26	1	7	125	37	+88	79	
4	Formartine United	34	22	6	6	97	37	+60	72	
5	Inverurie Loco Works	34	20	6	8	96	48	+48	66	
6	Forres Mechanics	34	21	3	10	79	40	+39	66	
7	Wick Academy	34	15	7	12	69	54	+15	52	
8	Buckie Thistle	34	14	7	13	72	54	+18	49	
9	Huntly	34	14	7	13	57	65	−8	49	
10	Rothes (Note: Rothes were deducted three points and fined £50 for fielding an ineligible player.)	34	13	8	13	73	57	+16	44	
11	Nairn County	34	13	3	18	61	67	−6	42	
12	Deveronvale	34	13	2	19	55	65	−10	41	
13	Keith	34	10	7	17	62	68	−6	37	
14	Strathspey Thistle	34	10	3	21	47	90	−43	33	
15	Turriff United	34	9	5	20	74	91	−17	32	
16	Clachnacuddin	34	6	6	22	44	79	−35	24	
17	Lossiemouth	34	2	2	30	29	139	−110	8	
18	Fort William (Note: Fort William were deducted nine points and fined £150 for fielding an ineligible player on three occasions.)	34	0	2	32	21	245	−224	−7	

Source: SHFL BBC Sport Soccerway
Rules for classification: 1) Points; 2) Goal difference; 3) Number of goals scored
(C) Champions; (O) Play-off winners; (P) Promoted

== Results ==
Home \ Away	BRO	BUC	CLA	COV	DEV	FOR	FOM	FRT	FRA	HUN	INV	KEI	LOS	NAI	ROT	STR	TUR	WIC
Brora Rangers		3–0	2–1	1–1	4–1	1–2	4–0	9–0	2–0	2–0	1–0	3–0	6–1	3–0	1–0	5–1	5–0	2–0
Buckie Thistle	0–4		2–0	0–3	2–0	3–1	4–1	4–0	1–4	1–1	0–2	1–2	0–0	2–1	3–2	5–0	2–1	5–2
Clachnacuddin	0–1	1–0		2–4	0–3	0–4	0–4	5–0	2–3	1–3	0–0	2–5	1–0	3–2	1–4	2–1	2–4	1–3
Cove Rangers	0–0	2–0	2–1		5–0	2–0	2–0	11–0	2–0	3–0	1–0	2–0	4–0	3–0	6–2	7–1	3–0	5–0
Deveronvale	0–1	0–3	2–1	0–1		1–4	0–5	6–0	1–5	0–0	1–2	2–2	7–0	0–1	0–1	0–4	3–2	3–2
Formartine United	0–0	2–0	5–0	0–0	3–0		1–2	14–1	2–0	4–0	4–2	3–0	2–0	4–1	3–3	5–1	4–1	1–2
Forres Mechanics	0–2	7–2	1–0	0–1	2–1	0–1		5–0	1–2	4–0	2–1	2–1	4–1	4–1	0–0	0–0	2–1	4–0
Fort William	0–11	1–11	3–3	0–6	0–8	2–8	1–6		0–7	1–6	1–7	1–4	3–4	2–6	0–5	1–1	0–10	1–5
Fraserburgh	2–1	2–1	3–0	1–0	4–1	2–1	3–4	13–0		7–1	2–4	3–1	10–0	7–1	2–0	5–1	2–0	2–3
Huntly	0–1	3–1	1–1	0–4	2–0	0–0	0–1	6–0	2–2		0–4	2–1	1–0	0–5	4–4	2–1	2–3	1–0
Inverurie Loco Works	2–0	0–0	2–2	2–3	2–0	2–4	2–1	10–0	0–5	6–3		4–1	7–0	2–2	1–0	3–2	7–0	1–1
Keith	0–4	0–0	3–0	0–1	1–2	2–3	0–3	11–0	0–3	1–2	1–4		4–4	2–1	2–1	0–2	2–2	2–2
Lossiemouth	1–5	0–8	1–5	0–5	2–4	2–4	1–5	5–0	0–7	0–4	2–5	2–4		0–5	0–4	2–4	1–3	0–3
Nairn County	0–4	2–2	3–1	0–1	0–1	1–0	3–0	4–0	1–2	5–1	0–3	1–2	1–0		1–1	3–0	5–2	1–4
Rothes	0–2	1–1	1–1	0–4	0–2	3–3	5–1	11–1	1–2	0–1	1–2	2–0	1–0	6–1		3–4	3–2	2–1
Strathspey Thistle	0–4	1–5	3–2	2–3	2–1	1–1	0–4	5–1	1–3	0–4	0–3	0–4	1–0	1–0	1–2		1–2	4–2
Turriff United	0–5	3–3	2–1	0–1	2–3	2–3	2–4	12–1	0–9	0–3	2–2	2–2	4–0	2–3	3–3	4–0		0–2
Wick Academy	0–0	2–0	2–2	0–2	0–2	0–1	0–0	6–0	2–1	2–2	6–2	2–2	8–0	2–0	1–3	2–1	2–1	

Source: highlandfootballleague.com
Legend: Blue = home team win; Yellow = draw; Red = away team win.
