= Willie McCulloch (footballer, born 1948) =

Scottish footballer (1948–2023)

Personal information
- Date of birth: 7 January 1948
- Place of birth: Bannockburn, Scotland
- Date of death: 9 December 2023 (aged 75)
- Place of death: Larbert, Scotland
- Position: Midfielder

Senior career*
| Years | Team | Apps | (Gls) |
| 19??–1969 | Camelon Juniors | | |
| 1969–1973 | Alloa Athletic | 139 | (23) |
| 1973–1981 | Airdrieonians | 165 | (30) |
| 1981–1982 | Berwick Rangers | 33 | (6) |

Managerial career
- 1983–1984: Cowdenbeath
- * Club domestic league appearances and goals

Willie McCulloch (7 January 1948 – 9 December 2023) was a Scottish footballer who played as a midfielder in the Scottish League for Alloa Athletic, Airdrieonians and Berwick Rangers. After his retirement as a player, he managed Cowdenbeath. McCulloch died on 9 December 2023, at the age of 75.

== Honours ==
- Airdrieonians Hall of Fame
