= 2000–01 Scottish Second Division =

Scottish Second Division
- Season: 2000–01
- Champions: Partick Thistle
- Promoted: Partick Thistle; Arbroath
- Relegated: Queens Park; Stirling Albion

The 2000–01 Scottish Second Division was won by Partick Thistle who, along with second placed Arbroath, were promoted to the First Division. Queen's Park and Stirling Albion were relegated to the Third Division.

== Table ==
Pos	Team	Pld	W	D	L	GF	GA	GD	Pts	Promotion or relegation
1	Partick Thistle (C, P)	36	22	9	5	66	32	+34	75	Promotion to the First Division
2	Arbroath (P)	36	15	13	8	54	38	+16	58	Promotion to the First Division
3	Berwick Rangers	36	14	12	10	51	44	+7	54	
4	Stranraer	36	15	9	12	51	50	+1	54	
5	Clydebank	36	12	11	13	42	43	−1	47	
6	Queen of the South	36	13	7	16	52	59	−7	46	
7	Stenhousemuir	36	12	6	18	45	63	−18	42	
8	Forfar Athletic	36	10	10	16	48	52	−4	40	
9	Queens Park (R)	36	10	10	16	28	40	−12	40	Relegation to the Third Division
10	Stirling Albion (R)	36	5	17	14	34	50	−16	32	Relegation to the Third Division

Source: "2000-2001 Second Division - SPFL Archive". SPFL.
Rules for classification: 1) points; 2) goal difference; 3) number of goals scored.
(C) Champions; (P) Promoted; (R) Relegated

== Attendance ==
The average attendance for Scottish Second Division clubs for season 2000/01 are shown below:

Club	Average
Partick Thistle	2,917
Queen of the South	1,271
Queen's Park	1,141
Arbroath	805
Stirling Albion	787
Forfar Athletic	625
Berwick Rangers	609
Stenhousemuir	595
Stranraer	535
Clydebank	361
