= Paul Jonquin =

Scottish footballer

Paul Jonquin (16 October 1943 – 29 August 1995) was a Scottish footballer who played 708 first-team matches for Airdrieonians with 523 of those in the Scottish Football League.

He was born on 16 October 1943 - his father was Belgian - and joined Airdrie from Edinburgh Athletic in October 1961. A part-timer who worked as a photographer, he played mainly at right back but occasionally at left back. He was a capable defender and good overlapping fullback with considerable speed and was a regular penalty taker. He played 196 consecutive matches between April 1967 and September 1971. He played in the 1975 Scottish Cup Final, which Airdrie lost 3–1 to Celtic.

He played his last game in April 1979 at Broomfield Park, Airdrie. He was never booked in his senior career.

He died in August 1995 of a brain tumour.
