= Broadwood Cup =

- Founded: 2020
- Region: Cumbernauld
- Teams: 4
- Current champions: Airdrieonians (2nd title)
- Most championships: Clyde, Airdrieonians (2 titles)

The Broadwood Cup is an annual pre season football tournament in Cumbernauld, North Lanarkshire, Scotland. The tournament is hosted by Cumbernauld Colts at Broadwood Stadium.

== Background ==
The Broadwood Cup was launched in September 2020. It was sponsored by Culture Leisure & North Lanarkshire (CLNL).

A four-team competition that features two semi finals. The winners advance to the final, while the losers play off for 3rd and 4th positions.

The inaugural tournament was played behind closed doors because of COVID-19 restrictions. Supporters were able to return for the next edition.

The second tournament was streamed live by Gonzo Digital through TicketCo TV, but not the official Clyde FC Live channel.

After the situation following David Goodwillie with Clyde, NL banned them from using Broadwood as their home ground, subsequently they moved to New Douglas Park, home of Hamilton Academical. Cumbernauld Colts were then the main hosts of the Cup.

In 2024, Cumbernauld Colts had to cancel the 2024 edition of the tournament (which was set to include themselves, defending champions Airdrieonians, as well as Motherwell and Hamilton Academical) but was cancelled due to NL using Broadwood as a fan hub for Euro 2024, however, derbies did still happen that pre-season, with Airdrieonains hosting Albion Rovers at the Excelsior Stadium, with Airdrie winning 4–0.

== Past tournaments ==
After Clyde signed a shirt deal with BOC in 1979, the club held a BOC sponsored friendly tournament at Shawfield won by Ayr United.

== Placings ==
Year	Winners	Runners-up	Semi Finals	Ref
2020	Clyde	Stirling Albion	St Mirren Colts / Cumbernauld Colts	
2021	Clyde	Airdrieonians	Albion Rovers / Cumbernauld Colts	
2022	Airdrieonians	Cumbernauld Colts	Albion Rovers / Stirling Albion	
2023	Airdrieonians	Albion Rovers	Cumbernauld Colts / Motherwell F.C.	

=== Final (23/24) ===
2 July 2023	Albion Rovers	0–5	Airdrieonians	Cumbernauld
16:00			Ballantyne 6'; McGill 12', 39'; Todorov 59', 77'	Stadium: Broadwood Stadium; Attendance: 2,640; Referee: Duncan Williams
