= 2018–19 Scottish League Two =

Scottish League Two
- Season: 2018–19
- Dates: 4 August 2018 – 4 May 2019
- Champions: Peterhead
- Promoted: Peterhead; Clyde
- Relegated: Berwick Rangers
- Matches: 180
- Goals: 501 (2.78 per match)
- Top goalscorer: Blair Henderson (30 goals)
- Biggest home win: Queen's Park 7–1 Berwick Rangers (26 January 2019); Annan Athletic 6–0 Berwick Rangers (6 April 2019)
- Biggest away win: Berwick Rangers 0–5 Peterhead (8 December 2018); Albion Rovers 0–5 Stirling Albion (26 January 2019)
- Highest scoring: Albion Rovers 3–5 Berwick Rangers (1 September 2018); Queen's Park 7–1 Berwick Rangers (26 January 2019)
- Longest winning run: 8 matches: Edinburgh City
- Longest unbeaten run: 16 matches: Clyde
- Longest winless run: 19 matches: Albion Rovers
- Longest losing run: 8 matches: Albion Rovers
- Highest attendance: 1,371; Peterhead 1–1 Stirling Albion (27 April 2019)
- Lowest attendance: 145; Albion Rovers 1–1 Annan Athletic (29 December 2018)
- Total attendance: 90,826
- Average attendance: 504 (12)
- All statistics correct as of 4 May 2019.

The 2018–19 Scottish League Two (known as Ladbrokes League Two for sponsorship reasons) was the 25th season in the current format of 10 teams in the fourth-tier of Scottish football. The fixtures were published on 15 June 2018 and the season began on 4 August 2018.

The bottom team entered a two-legged play-off against the winners of the Pyramid play-off between the Highland League and Lowland League champions, to determine which team competes in League Two in the 2019–20 season.

Ten teams contested the league: Albion Rovers, Annan Athletic, Berwick Rangers, Clyde, Cowdenbeath, Edinburgh City, Elgin City, Peterhead, Queen's Park and Stirling Albion.

Peterhead lifted the title after a 2–0 win at Queen's Park on the final day.

== Teams ==
The following teams changed division after the 2017–18 season.

=== To League Two ===
Relegated from Scottish League One

- Queen's Park
- Albion Rovers

=== From League Two ===
Promoted to Scottish League One

- Montrose
- Stenhousemuir

=== Stadia and locations ===
Albion Rovers	Annan Athletic	Berwick Rangers	Clyde
Cliftonhill	Galabank	Shielfield Park	Broadwood Stadium
Capacity: 1,238	Capacity: 2,504	Capacity: 4,099	Capacity: 8,086
Cowdenbeath	Location of teams in 2018–19 Scottish League Two		Edinburgh City
Central Park	Location of teams in 2018–19 Scottish League Two		Ainslie Park
Capacity: 4,309	Location of teams in 2018–19 Scottish League Two		Capacity: 3,000
Elgin City	Peterhead	Queen's Park	Stirling Albion
Borough Briggs	Balmoor	Hampden Park	Forthbank Stadium
Capacity: 4,520	Capacity: 3,150	Capacity: 51,866	Capacity: 3,798

=== Personnel and kits ===
Team	Manager	Captain	Kit manufacturer	Shirt sponsor
Albion Rovers	(Scotland) Kevin Harper	(Scotland) Bryan Wharton	Joma	Reigart Demolition
Annan Athletic	(Republic of Ireland) Peter Murphy	(Scotland) Scott Hooper	Halbro	M&S Engineering Ltd
Berwick Rangers	(Scotland) John Brownlie	(Scotland) Robert Wilson	Mitre	Northern Soul Kitchen
Clyde	(Scotland) Danny Lennon	(Scotland) Kevin Nicoll	Kappa	Advance Construction Group (H); Rock Regen (A)
Cowdenbeath	(Scotland) Gary Bollan	(Scotland) Kyle Miller	Errea	Subsea Pressure Controls
Edinburgh City	(Scotland) James McDonaugh	(England) Josh Walker	Joma	CMC Property
Elgin City	(Scotland) Gavin Price	(Scotland) Darryl McHardy	EV2 Sportswear	McDonald & Munro
Peterhead	(Scotland) Jim McInally	(Scotland) Rory McAllister	Adidas	Independent Oilfield Services
Queen's Park	(Scotland) Mark Roberts	(Scotland) Scott Gibson	Under Armour	Irn-Bru
Stirling Albion	(Scotland) Kevin Rutkiewicz	(Scotland) Ross McGeachie	Macron	Prudential

=== Managerial changes ===
Team	Outgoing manager	Manner of departure	Date of vacancy	Position in table	Incoming manager	Date of appointment
Albion Rovers	(Scotland) Brian Kerr	Resigned	7 May 2018	Pre-season	(Scotland) John Brogan	22 May 2018
Queen's Park	(Scotland) Gus MacPherson	Left for St Mirren	18 September 2018	6th	(Scotland) Mark Roberts (interim)	20 September 2018
Queen's Park	(Scotland) Mark Roberts (interim)	End of interim	12 October 2018	6th	(Scotland) Mark Roberts	12 October 2018
Stirling Albion	(Scotland) Dave Mackay	Sacked	29 September 2018	7th	(Scotland) Kevin Rutkiewicz	22 October 2018
Berwick Rangers	(Scotland) Robbie Horn	Resigned	6 October 2018	9th	(Scotland) Johnny Harvey	16 October 2018
Albion Rovers	(Scotland) John Brogan	Resigned	21 October 2018	10th	(Scotland) Kevin Harper	6 November 2018
Berwick Rangers	(Scotland) Johnny Harvey	Sacked	2 May 2019	10th	(Scotland) John Brownlie	2 May 2019

== League summary ==
=== League table ===
Pos	Team	Pld	W	D	L	GF	GA	GD	Pts	Promotion, qualification or relegation
1	Peterhead (C, P)	36	24	7	5	65	29	+36	79	Promotion to League One
2	Clyde (Note: Albion Rovers and Queen's Park were awarded 3–0 technical victories against Clyde in February 2019 after Clyde fielded an ineligible player. The original matches had finished 1–0 to Clyde and 1–1 respectively.) (O, P)	36	23	5	8	63	35	+28	74	Qualification for the League One play-offs
3	Edinburgh City	36	20	7	9	58	31	+27	67	Qualification for the League One play-offs
4	Annan Athletic	36	20	6	10	70	39	+31	66	Qualification for the League One play-offs
5	Stirling Albion	36	13	8	15	44	45	−1	47	
6	Cowdenbeath	36	12	7	17	46	46	0	43	
7	Queen's Park	36	11	10	15	44	47	−3	43	
8	Elgin City	36	13	4	19	52	67	−15	43	
9	Albion Rovers	36	7	6	23	32	71	−39	27	
10	Berwick Rangers (R)	36	5	4	27	27	91	−64	19	Qualification for the League Two play-off final

Source: SPFL
Rules for classification: 1) Points; 2) Goal difference; 3) Number of goals scored
(C) Champions; (O) Play-off winners; (P) Promoted; (R) Relegated

=== Positions by round ===
The table lists the positions of teams after each week of matches. In order to preserve chronological progress, any postponed matches are not included in the round at which they were originally scheduled, but added to the full round they were played immediately afterwards. For example, if a match is scheduled for matchday 13, but then postponed and played between days 16 and 17, it will be added to the standings for day 16.

Leader - Promotion to 2019–20 League One
Qualification for League One play-offs
Qualification for League Two play-off final

Team \ Round	1	2	3	4	5	6	7	8	9	10	11	12	13	14	15	16	17	18	19	20	21	22	23	24	25	26	27	28	29	30	31	32	33	34	35	36
Peterhead	6	2	1	1	2	2	2	2	2	2	1	2	2	2	2	2	2	2	2	2	1	2	2	2	2	1	1	1	1	1	1	1	1	1	1	1
Clyde	2	1	5	6	4	3	3	3	3	4	3	3	3	3	3	3	3	3	3	3	3	3	3	3	3	3	3	3	3	3	3	3	2	2	2	2
Edinburgh City	1	6	4	3	1	1	1	1	1	1	2	1	1	1	1	1	1	1	1	1	2	1	1	1	1	2	2	2	2	2	2	2	3	3	3	3
Annan Athletic	4	3	2	2	3	4	4	4	4	3	4	4	4	4	5	5	5	4	4	4	4	4	4	4	4	4	4	4	4	4	4	4	4	4	4	4
Stirling Albion	8	9	9	9	9	7	7	7	8	8	8	8	9	8	8	8	8	8	7	7	6	5	5	5	5	6	5	6	6	5	5	5	5	5	5	5
Cowdenbeath	9	8	7	7	8	9	9	9	7	7	7	7	7	6	6	6	6	6	6	5	5	7	7	7	7	7	7	7	8	8	8	8	8	7	7	6
Queen's Park	7	5	6	5	5	6	6	6	6	6	6	6	6	7	7	7	7	7	8	8	8	8	8	8	8	8	8	8	7	7	7	6	6	6	6	7
Elgin City	5	4	3	4	6	5	5	5	5	5	5	5	5	5	4	4	4	5	5	6	7	6	6	6	6	5	6	5	5	6	6	7	7	8	8	8
Albion Rovers	10	10	10	10	10	10	10	10	10	10	10	10	10	10	10	10	10	10	10	10	10	10	10	10	10	10	10	10	10	9	9	9	9	9	9	9
Berwick Rangers	3	7	8	8	7	8	8	8	9	9	9	9	8	9	9	9	9	9	9	9	9	9	9	9	9	9	9	9	9	10	10	10	10	10	10	10

Source: Scottish League Two - Table
Updated: 4 May 2019

== Results ==
Teams play each other four times, twice in the first half of the season (home and away) and twice in the second half of the season (home and away), making a total of 180 games, with each team playing 36.

=== First half of season ===
Home \ Away	ALB	ANN	BER	CLY	COW	EDC	ELG	PET	QUE	STI
Albion Rovers	—	1–1	3–5	0–3	1–1	1–2	0–1	0–4	0–3	3–1
Annan Athletic	3–1	—	4–0	1–2	0–2	1–2	1–1	1–3	3–1	2–2
Berwick Rangers	2–0	0–3	—	2–3	0–3	2–2	0–3	0–5	1–2	1–0
Clyde	1–0	1–0	3–3	—	2–0	0–2	4–1	1–3	2–0	1–1
Cowdenbeath	1–1	1–2	4–0	1–1	—	0–2	1–2	2–4	2–0	1–0
Edinburgh City	4–0	2–1	3–0	0–1	1–0	—	4–1	1–1	2–0	3–1
Elgin City	4–2	0–1	2–4	1–3	3–1	1–0	—	0–3	2–1	0–3
Peterhead	2–1	2–1	1–0	1–0	1–0	0–1	3–0	—	1–1	4–1
Queen's Park	2–0	0–0	1–0	1–0	0–0	0–2	0–4	2–0	—	1–1
Stirling Albion	1–0	1–2	3–0	0–3	2–1	0–1	5–2	0–2	1–0	—

Source: Scottish League Two
Legend: Blue = home team win; Yellow = draw; Red = away team win.

=== Second half of season ===
Home \ Away	ALB	ANN	BER	CLY	COW	EDC	ELG	PET	QUE	STI
Albion Rovers	—	0–2	1–1	0–1	1–0	3–2	0–3	0–2	0–4	0–5
Annan Athletic	4–0	—	6–0	1–1	3–2	3–1	2–0	3–0	2–1	2–2
Berwick Rangers	0–3	1–2	—	0–3	1–1	0–2	0–3	2–0	0–3	1–2
Clyde	0–3	2–1	5–0	—	1–0	1–0	2–0	3–3	3–0	3–1
Cowdenbeath	1–0	2–4	2–0	2–1	—	4–1	2–1	1–3	0–0	1–2
Edinburgh City	3–1	1–2	1–0	1–2	2–0	—	1–1	0–0	2–0	0–1
Elgin City	0–2	0–1	2–0	2–1	1–4	3–3	—	1–2	2–2	3–2
Peterhead	1–1	2–1	2–0	1–2	2–1	0–0	1–0	—	2–1	1–1
Queen's Park	2–2	0–3	7–1	3–0	1–1	0–4	4–1	0–2	—	0–0
Stirling Albion	0–1	2–1	1–0	0–1	0–1	0–0	2–1	0–1	1–1	—

Source: Scottish League Two
Legend: Blue = home team win; Yellow = draw; Red = away team win.

== Season statistics ==
=== Scoring ===
==== Top scorers ====
As of 4 May 2019

Rank	Player	Club	Goals
1	(Scotland) Blair Henderson	Edinburgh City	30
2	(Scotland) David Goodwillie	Clyde	17
3	(Scotland) Rory McAllister	Peterhead	15
4	(Scotland) Shane Sutherland	Elgin City & Peterhead	13
5	(Scotland) Tommy Muir	Annan Athletic	12
5	(Scotland) Tony Wallace	Annan Athletic	12

==== Hat-tricks ====
Player	For	Against	Result	Date	Ref
(Scotland) Blair Henderson	Edinburgh City	Albion Rovers	4–0 (H)	4 August 2018	
(Scotland) Blair Henderson	Edinburgh City	Elgin City	4–1 (H)	15 December 2018	
(Scotland) Peter MacDonald	Stirling Albion	Albion Rovers	0–5 (A)	26 January 2019	
(Scotland) Darryl McHardy	Elgin City	Albion Rovers	0–3 (A)	9 February 2019	
(Scotland) David Galt	Queen's Park	Elgin City	4–1 (H)	16 March 2019	
(Scotland) Jordan Allan	Cowdenbeath	Edinburgh City	4–1 (H)	6 April 2019	

Note

(H) = Home, (A) = Away;

=== Attendances ===
Pos	Team	Total	High	Low	Average	Change
1	Peterhead	12,021	1,371	522	667	+9.2%
2	Clyde	11,485	1,012	408	638	+29.7%
3	Elgin City	11,211	929	485	622	+2.5%
4	Queen's Park	11,001	1,076	404	611	−11.1%
5	Stirling Albion	10,583	802	413	587	−10.7%
6	Berwick Rangers	8,599	975	293	477	+10.2%
7	Edinburgh City	7,223	1,057	247	401	+24.9%
8	Annan Athletic	7,168	569	317	398	+15.0%
9	Cowdenbeath	6,384	1,007	250	354	+11.0%
10	Albion Rovers	5,151	560	145	286	−37.3%
	League total	90,826	1,371	145	504	+2.4%

Updated to games played on 4 May 2019

== Awards ==
=== Monthly awards ===
Month	Manager of the Month		Player of the Month		Ref.
Month	Manager	Club	Player	Club	Ref.
August	(Republic of Ireland) Peter Murphy	Annan Athletic	(Scotland) Rory McAllister	Peterhead	
September	(Scotland) James McDonaugh	Edinburgh City	(England) Conrad Balatoni	Edinburgh City	
October	(Scotland) Mark Roberts	Queen's Park	(Scotland) Blair Henderson	Edinburgh City	
November	(Northern Ireland) Danny Lennon	Clyde	(England) Dylan Cogill	Clyde	
December	(Scotland) Jim McInally	Peterhead	(Scotland) Blair Henderson	Edinburgh City	
January	(Northern Ireland) Danny Lennon	Clyde	(Scotland) Peter MacDonald	Stirling Albion	
February	(Republic of Ireland) Peter Murphy	Annan Athletic	(Scotland) Chris Johnston	Annan Athletic	
March	(Scotland) Kevin Harper	Albion Rovers	(Scotland) Peter Morrison	Albion Rovers	
April	(Northern Ireland) Danny Lennon	Clyde	(Nigeria) Smart Osadolor	Albion Rovers	

== League Two play-offs ==
The Pyramid play-off was contested between the champions of the 2018–19 Highland Football League (Cove Rangers) and the 2018–19 Lowland Football League (East Kilbride). Cove were victorious 5–1 on aggregate and faced the bottom club (Berwick Rangers) in the League Two play-off final, being promoted to League Two for the 2019–20 season after a 7–0 aggregate win. As Berwick Rangers lost the play-off, they were relegated to the Lowland League since they were an England-based club (they were based in Berwick-upon-Tweed), and England is south of 56.4513N latitude (middle of the Tay Road Bridge).

=== Pyramid play-off ===
==== First leg ====
27 April 2019	East Kilbride	1–2	Cove Rangers	East Kilbride
15:00	Longworth 90+3'	Report	Milne 3'; Ross 35'	Stadium: K-Park Training Academy; Referee: Grant Irvine

==== Second leg ====
4 May 2019	Cove Rangers	3–0 (5–1 agg.)	East Kilbride	Aberdeen
15:00	Megginson 29', 42'; Masson 80'	Report		Stadium: Balmoral Stadium; Referee: Mike Roncone

=== Final ===
==== First leg ====
11 May 2019	Cove Rangers	4–0	Berwick Rangers	Aberdeen
15:00	Burnett 23'; Megginson 38'; Brown 79'; Masson 83'	Report		Stadium: Balmoral Stadium; Attendance: 1,955; Referee: David Lowe

==== Second leg ====
18 May 2019	Berwick Rangers	0–3 (0–7 agg.)	Cove Rangers	Berwick-upon-Tweed
15:00		Report	Masson 9'; Brown 47'; McManus 75'	Stadium: Shielfield Park; Attendance: 1,314; Referee: John McKendrick
