= Tommy Duncan (footballer) =

Scottish footballer (1936–2024)

Personal information
- Full name: Thomas Montgomerie Duncan
- Date of birth: 15 July 1936
- Place of birth: Portsoy, Scotland
- Date of death: March 2024 (aged 87)
- Position: Outside left

Youth career
- –1952: Buckie Thistle

Senior career*
Years	Team	Apps	(Gls)
1952–1963	Airdrieonians	144	(43)
1958	→ Newport County (loan)	1	(0)
1965	Dundee	0	(0)
1965	Falkirk	8	(1)
1965	Stirling Albion	1	(0)

Managerial career
- 1969–1974: Queen's Park
- * Club domestic league appearances and goals

Thomas Montgomerie Duncan (15 July 1936 – March 2024) was a Scottish professional football outside left, best remembered for his 11 years in the Scottish League with Airdrieonians. He also briefly played in the Football League on loan at Newport County. Duncan later managed Queen's Park between November 1969 and May 1974.

Duncan's senior professional football career commenced as a 16-year-old in the Scottish Highland Football League with his local senior football club, Buckie Thistle.

Duncan died in March 2024, at the age of 87.
