= Bobby Watson (footballer) =

Scottish footballer and manager (born 1946)

Personal information
- Full name: Robert Watson
- Date of birth: 15 May 1946 (age 80)
- Place of birth: Airdrie, Scotland
- Position: Defender

Senior career*
Years	Team	Apps	(Gls)
1964–1969	Rangers	52	(4)
1969–1976	Motherwell	182	(3)
Total		234	(7)

International career
1971	Scotland	1	(0)

Managerial career
- 1978–1982: Airdrie
- 1983–1984: Motherwell
- 1988: Partick Thistle (caretaker)
- * Club domestic league appearances and goals

Robert Watson (born 15 May 1946) is a Scottish former football player and manager. He is currently involved with Airdrieonians, and was the club chairman in 2018.

Watson played as a defender for Rangers and Motherwell. Watson was transferred from Rangers to Motherwell in a deal that also involved Peter McCloy and Brian Heron. Watson represented Scotland once, in a friendly match played against the Soviet Union in 1971. Watson was one of the players who had to wait many years to receive an official cap to mark this achievement, as caps were only given to players who played in British Home Championship matches before the mid-1970s.

Watson retired from playing in 1976 to run a steel business with his partner David Towers. He then managed Airdrie and Motherwell, but only lasted six months in charge of the latter as they were relegated from the Scottish Premier Division. Watson and Towers then helped to set up another business, Cairnhill Structures, in 1990. He was also known as a lay preacher.

In April 2015 Watson was inducted into the Airdrieonians Hall Of Fame, an awards ceremony to honour former Airdrieonians managers and players. Between January 2018 and January 2019 he was club chairman, after the club was taken over by new owners.
