= Billy Wilson (Scottish footballer) =

Scottish footballer and manager

Personal information
- Date of birth: c. 1947
- Place of birth: Bageddie, Scotland
- Position: Winger

Senior career*
Years	Team	Apps	(Gls)
–	Kilsyth Rangers		
1967–1979	Airdrieonians	279	(47)
–	Cumbernauld United		
Total		279	(47)

Managerial career
- –: Kilsyth Rangers
- 1983–1984: Albion Rovers
- * Club domestic league appearances and goals

William Wilson (born c. 1947) is a Scottish former football player and manager.

Wilson played as a winger, starting his playing career at Kilsyth Rangers, where he won the Scottish Junior Cup in 1967 before moving up to the senior level with Airdrieonians along with Drew Jarvie. He was with the Diamonds for twelve years, making 279 appearances in the Scottish Football League and playing in the 1975 Scottish Cup Final (he was later voted into the club's 'Greatest Ever XI' in 2016). He left Airdrie in 1979 to join Cumbernauld United and subsequently became manager of Kilsyth Rangers. Wilson was manager of Albion Rovers during the 1983/84 season.
