= Kevin McCann (footballer, born 1953) =

Scottish footballer

Personal information
- Date of birth: 10 June 1953 (age 73)
- Position: Winger

Senior career*
Years	Team	Apps	(Gls)
- Carluke Rovers
1972–1979	Airdrieonians	144	(14)
1979–1983	Queen of the South	120	(8)
1983–1984	Stenhousemuir	11	(0)
- Workington
Total		275	(22)
- * Club domestic league appearances and goals

Kevin McCann (born 10 June 1953) is a Scottish professional footballer who played as a winger for Carluke Rovers, Airdrieonians, Queen of the South, Stenhousemuir and Workington.
