= Willie McCulloch =

Scottish footballer

Personal information
- Full name: Willie McCulloch
- Date of birth: 2 April 1973 (age 53)
- Place of birth: Baillieston, Scotland
- Position: Goalkeeper

Senior career*
Years	Team	Apps	(Gls)
1992–1996	Airdrie	4	(0)
1996–1997	Ayr United	0	(0)
1997–2000	East Fife	100	(0)
2000–2002	Berwick Rangers	39	(0)
2002–2003	Stranraer	9	(0)
2003–2007	Stenhousemuir	131	(0)
2007–2009	East Fife	37	(0)
- * Club domestic league appearances and goals as of 13:28, 15 May 2009 (UTC)

Willie McCulloch (born 2 April 1973 in Baillieston, Glasgow) is a Scottish professional football goalkeeper.
