= 2001–02 Scottish First Division =

Scottish First Division
- Season: 2001–02
- Champions: Partick Thistle
- Promoted: Partick Thistle
- Relegated: Raith Rovers
- Top goalscorer: Owen Coyle (23)

The 2001–02 Scottish First Division was won by Partick Thistle who were promoted to the Scottish Premier League. Raith Rovers were relegated to the Second Division however Falkirk avoided being relegated because Airdrieonians became insolvent.

== League table ==
Pos	Team	Pld	W	D	L	GF	GA	GD	Pts	Promotion or relegation
1	Partick Thistle (C, P)	36	19	9	8	61	38	+23	66	Promotion to the Premier League
2	Airdrieonians (R)	36	15	11	10	59	40	+19	56	Club folded after the season
3	Ayr United	36	13	13	10	53	44	+9	52	
4	Ross County	36	14	10	12	51	43	+8	52	
5	Clyde	36	13	10	13	51	56	−5	49	
6	Inverness CT	36	13	9	14	60	51	+9	48	
7	Arbroath	36	14	6	16	42	59	−17	48	
8	St Mirren	36	11	12	13	43	53	−10	45	
9	Falkirk (Note: Falkirk were reprieved from relegation due to Airdrieonians folding.)	36	10	9	17	49	73	−24	39	
10	Raith Rovers (R)	36	8	11	17	50	62	−12	35	Relegation to the Second Division

Source: "2001-2002 First Division - SPFL Archive". SPFL.
Rules for classification: 1) points; 2) goal difference; 3) number of goals scored.
(C) Champions; (P) Promoted; (R) Relegated

== Attendances ==
The average attendances for Scottish First Division clubs for season 2001/02 are shown below:

Club	Average
Partick Thistle	4,434
St Mirren	3,663
Ross County	2,757
Falkirk	2,478
Ayr United	2,457
Inverness CT	2,046
Airdrieonians	2,001
Raith Rovers	1,911
Clyde	1,476
Arbroath	956
