= List of Celtic F.C. records and statistics =

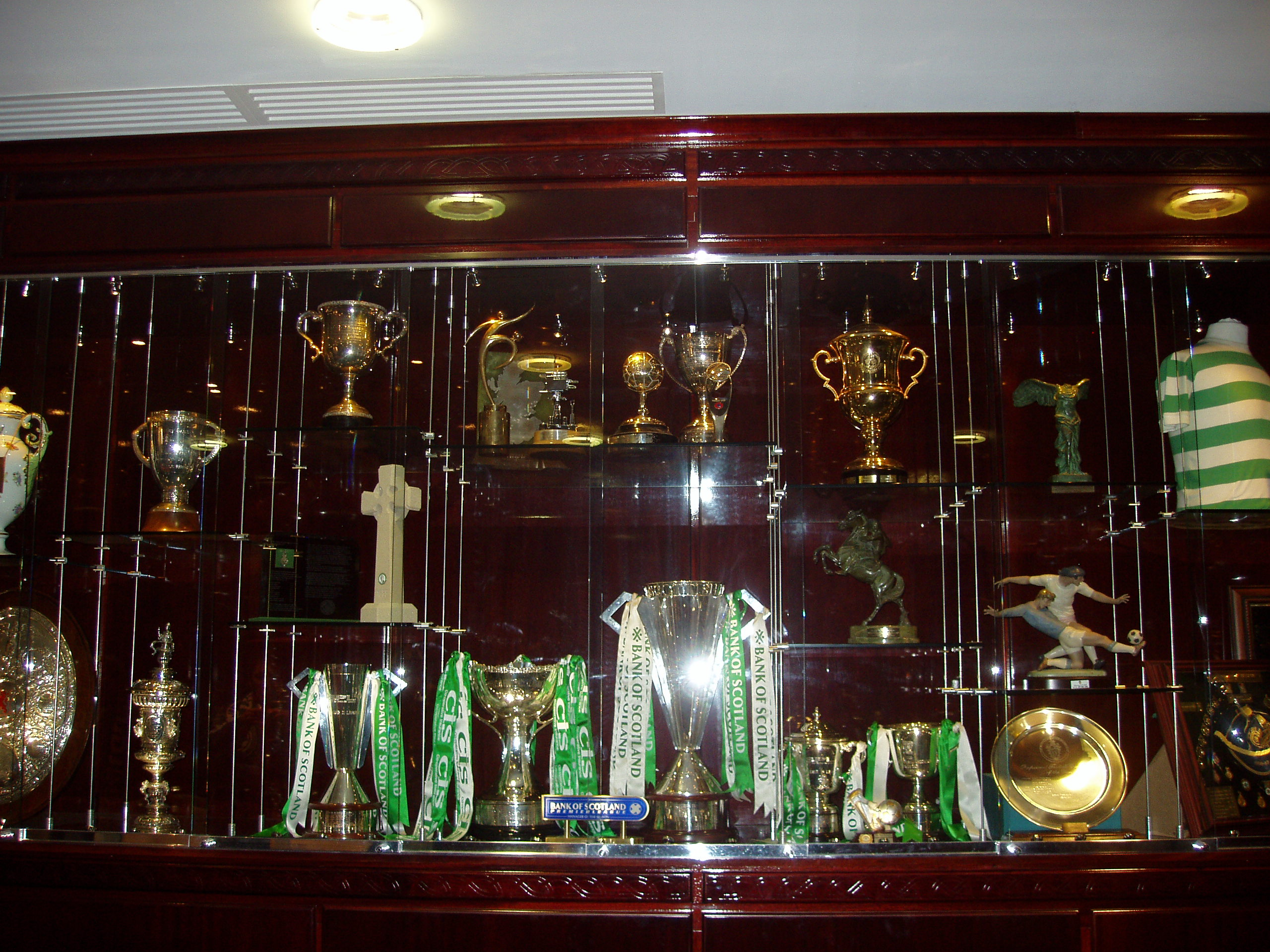
A trophy case in the Celtic Park trophy room

Celtic Football Club are a Scottish professional association football club based in Glasgow. They have played at their home ground, Celtic Park, since 1892. Celtic were founding members of the Scottish Football League in 1890, and the Scottish Premier League in 1998 as well as the Scottish Professional Football League in 2013.

The list encompasses the major honours won by Celtic, records set by the club, their managers and their players. The player records section includes details of the club's leading goalscorers and those who have made most appearances in first-team competitions. It also records notable achievements by Celtic players on the international stage, and the highest transfer fees paid and received by the club. Attendance records at Celtic Park, and also at Hampden Park which has on occasion been used for home games, are also included.

Celtic have won 55 top-flight titles, and hold the record for most Scottish Cup wins with 43. The club's record appearance maker is Billy McNeill, who made 822 appearances between 1957 and 1975. Jimmy McGrory is the club's record goalscorer, scoring 522 goals during his Celtic career.

All figures are correct as of 21 November 2026

== Honours ==
Celtic's first ever silverware was won in 1889 when they defeated Cowlairs 6–1 in the final of the North-Eastern Cup. A year later they won the Glasgow Cup, before winning their first major national honour in 1892 by defeating Queen's Park 5–1 in the final of the Scottish Cup. Celtic won their first league title in 1892–93. In 1906–07 Celtic became the first club to win the league and cup double in Scotland, a feat they have now accomplished on 14 occasions. They won their first domestic treble in 1966–67, the same season they became the first British club to win the European Cup with their 2–1 victory over Inter Milan in the final. Celtic's most recent success was their win in the 2024–25 Scottish Premiership. Celtic have won a total of 122 major trophies.

In all, Celtic have won the Scottish League Championship a record 56 times, the Scottish Cup a record 43 times, the Scottish League Cup 22 times and the European Cup once. They have completed a world-record, eight domestic trebles, including an unprecedented quadruple treble between the 2016–17 and 2019–20 seasons.

=== Domestic ===
League

- Scottish League Championship:
  - Winners (56): 1893, 1894, 1896, 1898, 1905, 1906, 1907, 1908, 1909, 1910, 1914, 1915, 1916, 1917, 1919, 1922, 1926, 1936, 1938, 1954, 1966, 1967, 1968, 1969, 1970, 1971, 1972, 1973, 1974, 1977, 1979, 1981, 1982, 1986, 1988, 1998, 2001, 2002, 2004, 2006, 2007, 2008, 2012, 2013, 2014, 2015, 2016, 2017, 2018, 2019, 2020, 2022, 2023, 2024, 2025, 2026
  - Runners-up (32): 1892, 1895, 1900, 1901, 1902, 1912, 1913, 1918, 1920, 1921, 1928, 1929, 1930, 1935, 1939, 1955, 1976, 1980, 1983, 1984, 1985, 1987, 1996, 1997, 1999, 2000, 2003, 2005, 2009, 2010, 2011, 2021

Cups

- Scottish Cup:
  - Winners (43): 1892, 1899, 1900, 1904, 1907, 1908, 1911, 1912, 1914, 1923, 1925, 1927, 1931, 1933, 1937, 1951, 1954, 1965, 1967, 1969, 1971, 1972, 1974, 1975, 1977, 1980, 1985, 1988, 1989, 1995, 2001, 2004, 2005, 2007, 2011, 2013, 2017, 2018, 2019, 2020, 2023, 2024, 2026
  - Runners-up (19): 1889, 1893, 1894, 1901, 1902, 1926, 1928, 1955, 1956, 1961, 1963, 1966, 1970, 1973, 1984, 1990, 1999, 2002, 2025
- Scottish League Cup:
  - Winners (22): 1957, 1958, 1966, 1967, 1968, 1969, 1970, 1975, 1983, 1998, 2000, 2001, 2006, 2009, 2015, 2017, 2018, 2019, 2020, 2022, 2023, 2025
  - Runners-up (16): 1965, 1971, 1972, 1973, 1974, 1976, 1977, 1978, 1984, 1987, 1991, 1995, 2003, 2011, 2012, 2026

=== International ===
- European Cup:
  - Winners: 1967
  - Runners-up: 1970
- UEFA Cup
  - Runners-up: 2003
- Intercontinental Cup
  - Runners-up: 1967

=== Others ===
- Glasgow Cup: 29 (contested by youth teams from 1990, see below)

1891, 1892, 1895, 1896, 1905, 1906, 1907, 1908, 1910, 1916, 1917, 1920, 1921, 1927, 1928, 1929, 1931, 1939, 1941, 1949, 1956, 1962, 1964, 1965, 1967, 1968, 1970, 1975 (shared)*, 1982
* 1975 trophy shared with Rangers after a 2–2 draw.

- Glasgow Charity Cup: 28

1892, 1893, 1894, 1895, 1896, 1899, 1903, 1905, 1908, 1912, 1913, 1914, 1915, 1916, 1917, 1918, 1920, 1921, 1924, 1926, 1936, 1937, 1938, 1943, 1950, 1953, 1959, 1961 (shared)*
* 1961 trophy shared with Clyde after a 1–1 draw.

Cross Border (Note: In addition, Celtic also took part in World Championship Challenge (1892 and 1907), Champion of Britain Challenge (1894), League International Championship (1896), Championship of Great Britain (1898), Cup Winners' Challenges in (1912 1927, and 1951). No physical trophies awarded though.)

- British League Cup: 1

1902

- Budapest Cup: 1

1914

- Empire Exhibition Trophy: 1

1938

- Coronation Cup: 1

1953

- Dubai Champions Cup: 1

1989

National

- Saint Mungo Cup: 1

1951

- Drybrough Cup: 1

1974

Regional

- Glasgow North Eastern Cup: 2

1888–89, 1889–90

- Glasgow Football League: 1

1898–99

- Inter City Football League: 1

1899–1900

- Benefit Tournament: 1

1902

- War Fund Shield: 1

1918

- St Vincent de Paul Charity Cup: 1

1928

- Victory in Europe Cup: 1

1945

Indoor football

- Daily Express National Fives: 1

1981

- Tennents' Sixes: 2

1992, 2026

Friendly (Note: In addition, Celtic also took part in Blue & White Trophy (1962), Nijmegen Tournament (1980), Trans-Atlantic Cup (1981), Labatt's International Cup (1982), Kaufhof Cup (1982), Gianni Brera Tournament (1993), Irish International Soccer Tournament (1997), Dwango Cup (2006), Uhrencup (2007), Feyenoord Jubilee Tournament (2008), Algarve Cup (2009), Emirates Cup (2010), Dublin Super Cup (2011), Antalya Cup (2014), International Champions Cup (2016), Veolia Trophy (2020), Florida Cup (2024), and Como Cup (2025).)

- Clydesdale Harriers Cup: 1

1889

- Tournoi Franco-Britannique de Paris: 1

1921

- D. Kennedy Cup: 1

1951

- Alfredo di Stefano Trophy: 1

1967

- CNE Cup of Champions: 1

1968

- World of Soccer Cup: 1

1977

- Feyenoord Tournament: 1

1981

- Celtic Centenary Cup: 1

1988

- GFR Challenge Trophy: 1

1989

- Bord Gais Trophy: 1

1992

- Brother Walfrid Kearns Trophy: 1

1994

- Hamilton Cup: 1

1994

- Brandy Cup: 1

1999

- Translink Cup: 1

2009

- Wembley Cup: 1

2009

- Fenway Football Challenge: 1

2010

- Dublin Decider: 1

2013

- Dafabet Cup: 1

2017

- Cork Super Cup: 1

2025

- Adidas Trophy: 1

2025

=== Reserve ===
League

- Scottish Reserve League: 9

1895–96, 1958–59, 1959–60, 1960–61, 1962–63, 1964–65, 1965–66, 1969–70, 1970–71

- Premier Reserve League: 5

1979–80, 1984–85, 1990–91, 1993–94, 1994–95

- SPL Reserve League: 5

2004–05, 2005–06, 2006–07, 2007–08, 2008–09

- Scottish Alliance: 4

1921–22, 1933–34, 1936–37, 1937–38

Cup

- Scottish 2nd FA XI Cup: 8

1890–91, 1934–35, 1935–36, 1957–58, 1965–66, 1970–71, 1973–74, 1984–85

- Reserve League Cup: 13

1959–60, 1966–67, 1968–69, 1969–70, 1970–71, 1979–80, 1980–81, 1985–86, 1989–90, 1991–92, 1993–94, 1994–95, 1995–96,

Celtic 'Third XI'

- Combined Reserve League: 3

1960–61, 1962 –63, 1963–64

- CRL Autumn Series: 1

1963–64

- CRL Spring Series: 4

1959–60 (West), 1961–62, 1962–63, 1965–66

Other

- Kilsyth Charity Cup: 1

1889

Friendly

- Jock Stein Friendship Cup: 9

2006, 2007, 2008, 2009, 2010, 2016, 2017, 2018, 2019

- John Reames Trophy: 1

2010

- GFR Challenge Cup: 1

2019

=== Youth honours ===
- Scottish Youth Cup: 16

1984, 1987, 1989, 1996, 1997, 1999, 2003, 2005, 2006, 2010, 2011, 2012, 2013, 2015, 2017, 2023

- SPFL Development League: 12 (Previously SFL Youth/SPL U18/U19 league)

1995, 2000, 2003, 2004, 2005, 2006, 2010, 2011, 2012, 2013, 2014, 2016

- Under 21 Scottish Premier League: 3

2002, 2003, 2004

- Glasgow Cup: 12 (contested by senior team until 1989, see above)

1990, 1991, 1997, 1998, 2008, 2011, 2014, 2015, 2016, 2017, 2019, 2023

=== Women's Team ===
- Scottish Women's Premier League
  - Winners: 2024
  - Runners-up: 2009, 2010, 2021, 2023
- Scottish Cup
  - Winners: 2022, 2023
  - Runners-up: 2008
- Scottish Premier League Cup
  - Winners: 2010, 2021
  - Runners-up: 2017, 2018

=== Awards ===
- BBC Sports Team of the Year: 1

1967

- France Football European Team of the Year: 1

1970

- SPFA Special Merit Award: 1

1992 (awarded to Lisbon Lions)

- FIFA Fair Play Award: 1

2003 (awarded to fans of Celtic FC)

- UEFA Fair Play Award: 1

2003 (awarded to fans of Celtic FC)

- FIFA Fan Award: 1

2017 (awarded to fans of Celtic FC)

- Sunday Mail and sportScotland Team of the Year: 1

2017

- Scottish Football Hall of Fame: 1

2017 (Lisbon Lions inducted)

- IFFHS World Club Team of the Month: 3

November 2002, August 2003, August 2012

==== Other ====
- Polar Bear Trophy: 1

1975

- Real Madrid Silver Cabin: 1

1979

- BBC Quizball Trophy: 2

1969, 1970

- Programme Monthly
  - Scottish Programme of the Year (1985–86, 1990–91)
  - Premier Division Programme of the Year (1985–86, 1990–91)
- European Club Association
  - Best Community & Social Responsibility Programme Award (2011)
  - Best Achievement (non-sporting) Award (2014)
- Sports Technology Awards
  - Best Support Technology for Fans (2014)
- Inspiring City Awards
  - Best Corporate Social Responsibility (2015)
- Scottish Football Association
  - National Club Licensing Platinum Award (2015)
- Scottish Football Partnership
  - Facilities Award (2016)
- UK Stadium Business Awards
  - Best Fan Experience (2017)
- Centre for Access to Football in Europe
  - Collaboration Award (2018)

== Player records ==
=== Appearances ===
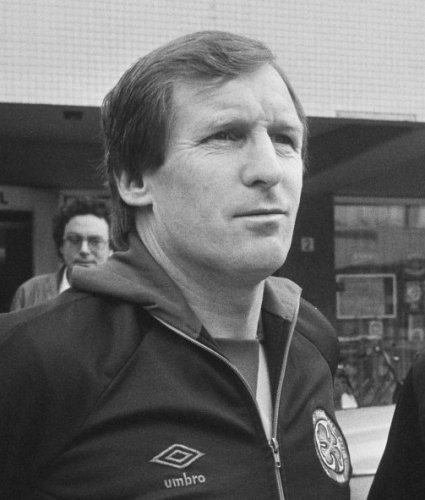
Billy McNeill made 822 appearances in all competitions for Celtic

- Most appearances in all competitions: Billy McNeill, 822
- Most League appearances: Alec McNair, 583
- Most Scottish Cup appearances: Billy McNeill, 94
- Most League Cup appearances: Billy McNeill, 138
- Most European appearances: Scott Brown, 127
- Youngest first-team player: Jack Aitchison, 16 years, 71 days (against Motherwell, 15 May 2016)
- Youngest first-team player in European competition: Karamoko Dembélé, 16 years, 294 days (against CFR Cluj, 12 December 2019)
- Oldest first-team player: Alec McNair, 41 years, 113 days (against Queens Park, 18 April 1925)
- Oldest debutant: Kasper Schmeichel, 37 years, 273 days against Kilmarnock
- Oldest outfield debutant: Dion Dublin, 36 years, 296 days (against Rangers, 12 February 2006)
- Most appearances in a season: Tommy Gemmell and John Clark, 62 (during the 1966–67 season)
- Longest-serving player: Alec McNair, 21 years (1904–1925)

=== Most appearances ===
Competitive, professional matches only (as of match played 8 November 2026)

| Rank | Name | Years | League | Scottish Cup | League Cup | Continental^{1} | Other^{2} | Total | Ref |
|---|---|---|---|---|---|---|---|---|---|
| 1 | (Scotland) Billy McNeill | 1957–1975 | 486 | 94 | 138 | 72 | 32 | 822 | |
| 2 | (Scotland) Alec McNair | 1904–1925 | 583 | 57 | 0 | 0 | 44 | 684 | |
| 3 | (Scotland) Paul McStay | 1981–1997 | 515 | 66 | 54 | 43 | 5 | 683 | |
| 4 | (Scotland) Roy Aitken | 1976–1990 | 484 | 55 | 82 | 48 | 13 | 682 | |
| 5 | (Scotland) Danny McGrain | 1970–1987 | 439 | 60 | 106 | 54 | 22 | 681 | |
| 6 | (Republic of Ireland) Packie Bonner | 1978–1995 | 483 | 55 | 64 | 40 | 4 | 646 | |
| 7 | (Scotland) Scott Brown | 2007–2021 | 407 | 53 | 33 | 127 | 0 | 620 | |
| 8 | (Scotland) Bobby Lennox | 1961–1978; 1979–1980 | 340 | 51 | 118 | 68 | 22 | 599 | |
| 9 | (Scotland) Callum McGregor | 2014– | 398 | 41 | 36 | 122 | 0 | 597 | |
| 10 | (Scotland) James Forrest | 2010– | 373 | 47 | 38 | 126 | 0 | 585 | |

=== Goalscorers ===
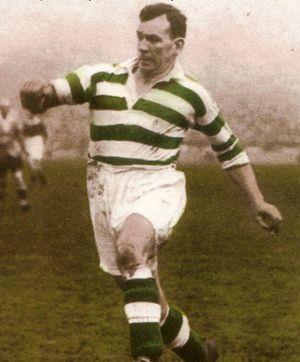
Jimmy McGrory, Celtic's all-time top goalscorer and the record scorer in British football history

- Most goals in all competitions: Jimmy McGrory, 522
- Most League goals: Jimmy McGrory, 396
- Most Scottish Cup goals: Jimmy McGrory, 74
- Most League Cup goals: Bobby Lennox, 63
- Most European goals: Henrik Larsson, 35
- Most goals in one season: Jimmy McGrory, 62 (during the 1927–28 season)
- Most League goals in one season: Jimmy McGrory, 50 (during the 1935–36 season)
- Most hat-tricks: Jimmy McGrory, 56 (55 games including one double hat-trick)
- Most penalties scored: Mike Haughney, 23
- Most goals scored by player in a match:
  - League match: Jimmy McGrory, 8 goals, won 9–0 (against Dunfermline Athletic, 14 January 1928)
  - Scottish Cup match: John Campbell, 7 goals (against 5th KRV, 17 December 1892)
  - Scottish League Cup match:
    - Bobby Lennox, 5 goals (against Hamilton Academical, 11 September 1968)
    - Bobby Lennox, 5 goals (against Partick Thistle, 31 August 1968)
    - Stevie Chalmers, 5 goals (against Hamilton Academical, 11 September 1968)
    - Stevie Chalmers, 5 goals (against East Fife, 16 September 1964)
  - European match: Dariusz Dziekanowski, 4 goals (against Partizan Belgrade, 27 September 1989)
- Fastest goal: Kris Commons 12.2 seconds (against Aberdeen, 16 March 2013)
- Youngest goalscorer: Jack Aitchison, 16 years, 71 days (against Motherwell in Scottish Premiership, 15 May 2016)
- Oldest goalscorer: Jimmy McMenemy, 39 years, 56 days (against Motherwell in league, 6 December 1919)

=== Top goalscorers ===
Competitive, professional matches only. Matches played appear in brackets

| Rank | Name | Years | League | Scottish Cup | League Cup | Continental^{1} | Other^{2} | Total | Ref |
|---|---|---|---|---|---|---|---|---|---|
| 1 | (Scotland) Jimmy McGrory | 1922–1937 | 396 (378) | 74 (67) | 0 (0) | 0 (0) | 32 (32) | 502^{3}(477)^{3} | |
| 2 | (Scotland) Bobby Lennox | 1961–1978; 1979–1980 | 171 (340) | 31 (51) | 63 (118) | 13 (68) | 23 (22) | 301 (599) | |
| 3 | (Sweden) Henrik Larsson | 1997–2004 | 174 (221) | 23 (25) | 10 (11) | 35 (58) | 0 (0) | 242 (315) | |
| 4 | (Scotland) Jimmy Quinn | 1900–1917 | 188 (272) | 30 (58) | 0 (0) | 0 (0) | 21 (39) | 239 (369) | |
| 5 | (Scotland) Stevie Chalmers | 1958–1971 | 155 (263) | 29 (47) | 31 (60) | 13 (39) | 8 (22) | 236 (431) | |
| 6 | (Scotland) Sandy McMahon | 1891–1903 | 131 (177) | 48 (45) | 0 (0) | 0 (0) | 21 (39) | 200 (261) | |
| 7 | (Ireland) Patsy Gallacher | 1911–1926 | 186 (432) | 9 (32) | 0 (0) | 0 (0) | 5 (27) | 200 (491) | |
| 8 | (Scotland) John Hughes | 1960–1971 | 114 (255) | 25 (51) | 38 (69) | 10 (41) | 10 (19) | 197 (435) | |
| 9 | (Scotland) Jimmy McMenemy | 1902–1920 | 142 (456) | 24 (59) | 0 (0) | 0 (0) | 10 (43) | 178 (558) | |
| 10 | (Scotland) Kenny Dalglish | 1968–1977 | 111 (204) | 11 (30) | 35 (60) | 9 (28) | 7 (16) | 173 (338) | |

^{1} Comprises appearances in the European Cup / Champions League, European Cup Winners Cup, UEFA Cup / Europa League, Inter-Cities Fairs Cup and the Intercontinental Cup

^{2} Includes cup competitions: the Glasgow Cup, Drybrough Cup and the Anglo-Scottish Cup. Appearance and goal statistics are not readily available for the Glasgow Charity Cup

^{3} In addition to these statistics, it is known that McGrory made a further 21 appearances in the Glasgow Charity Cup, scoring 20 goals. This makes McGrory's overall total of goals for Celtic in senior competitions 522 goals

=== International ===
- First capped player: Willie Groves and Thomas McKeown (for Scotland, against Ireland, 9 March 1889)
- Most international caps while a Celtic player: Packie Bonner, 80 for Republic of Ireland
- Most international caps for Scotland while a Celtic player: Paul McStay, 76
- Most capped player to play for Celtic: Robbie Keane, 143 for Republic of Ireland (3 caps whilst at Celtic)
- Most international goals while a Celtic player: Henrik Larsson, 21 for Sweden

==== World Cup ====
- First Celtic player to appear at a World Cup: Willie Fernie and Neil Mochan (for Scotland against Austria 8 June 1954)
- First Celtic player to score at a World Cup: Bobby Collins (for Scotland, against Paraguay, 11 June 1958)
- Most World Cup appearances while a Celtic player: Packie Bonner, 9
- Most World Cup goals while a Celtic player: Henrik Larsson, 5
- First World Cup winner to play for Celtic: Juninho

==== European Championship ====
- First Celtic player to appear at a European Championship: Packie Bonner, Mick McCarthy and Chris Morris (for Republic of Ireland, against England, 12 June 1988)
- First Celtic player to score at a European Championship: Paul McStay for Scotland, against CIS, 18 June 1992)
- Most European Championship appearances while a Celtic player: Henrik Larsson, 7
- Most European Championship goals while a Celtic player: Henrik Larsson, 4

=== Transfers ===
==== Record transfer fees paid ====
| Rank | Player | From | Fee | Date | Ref |
|---|---|---|---|---|---|
| 1 | (Denmark) Kasper Høgh | (Norway) Bodø/Glimt | £11,000,000 | 28 July 2026 | |
| 1 | (Belgium) Arne Engels | (Germany) FC Augsburg | £11,000,000 | 30 August 2024 | |
| 2 | (Republic of Ireland) Adam Idah | (England) Norwich City | £9,500,000 | 14 August 2024 | |
| 3 | (France) Odsonne Édouard | (France) Paris Saint-Germain | £9,000,000 | 15 June 2018 | |
| 3 | (Portugal) Jota | (France) Stade Rennais | £9,000,000 | 27 January 2025 | |
| 3 | (Egypt) Haissem Hassan | (Spain) Real Oviedo | £9,000,000 | 12 August 2026 | |
| 4 | (France) Christopher Jullien | (France) Toulouse | £7,000,000 | 28 June 2019 | |
| 5 | (Portugal) Jota | (Portugal) Benfica | £6,500,000 | 1 July 2022 | |
| 5 | (Germany) Mika Baur | (Germany) SC Paderborn | £6,500,000 | 13 August 2026 | |
| 6 | (England) Chris Sutton | (England) Chelsea | £6,000,000 | 11 July 2000 | |
| 6 | (Wales) John Hartson | (England) Coventry City | £6,000,000 | 2 August 2001 | |
| 6 | (United States) Cameron Carter-Vickers | (England) Tottenham Hotspur | £6,000,000 | 10 June 2022 | |
| 6 | (United States) Auston Trusty | (England) Sheffield United | £6,000,000 | 30 August 2024 | |
| 6 | (Colombia) Camilo Durán | (Azerbaijan) Qarabağ | £6,000,000 | 10 July 2026 | |
| 7 | (Israel) Eyal Berkovic | (England) West Ham United | £5,750,000 | 8 July 1999 | |
| 7 | (Northern Ireland) Neil Lennon | (England) Leicester City | £5,750,000 | 8 December 2000 | |
| 8 | (Greece) Vasilis Barkas | (Greece) AEK Athens | £5,000,000 | 30 July 2020 | |
| 8 | (Switzerland) Albian Ajeti | (England) West Ham United | £5,000,000 | 13 August 2020 | |
| 8 | (Tunisia) Sebastian Tounekti | (Sweden) Hammarby | £5,000,000 | 1 September 2025 | |
| 8 | (Democratic Republic of the Congo) Michel-Ange Balikwisha | (Belgium) Royal Antwerp | £5,000,000 | 28 August 2025 | |
| 8 | (Croatia) Jozo Šimunović | (Croatia) Dinamo Zagreb | £5,000,000 | 1 September 2015 | |
| 8 | (Brazil) Rafael Scheidt | (Brazil) Grêmio | £5,000,000 | 1 January 2000 | |
| 9 | (Cameroon) Olivier Ntcham | (England) Manchester City | £4,500,000 | 12 July 2017 | |
| 9 | (Japan) Kyogo Furuhashi | (Japan) Vissel Kobe | £4,500,000 | 16 July 2021 | |
| 10 | (Scotland) Scott Brown | (Scotland) Hibernian | £4,400,000 | 16 May 2007 | |
| 11 | (Poland) Maik Nawrocki | (Poland) Legia Warsaw | £4,300,000 | 26 July 2023 | |
| 12 | (Sweden) Carl Starfelt | (Russia) Rubin Kazan | £4,000,000 | 21 July 2021 | |
| 12 | (Netherlands) Jan Vennegoor of Hesselink | (Netherlands) PSV Eindhoven | £4,000,000 | 24 August 2006 | |
| 12 | (Honduras) Luis Palma | (Greece) Aris Thessaloniki | £4,000,000 | 30 August 2023 | |

==== Record transfer fees received ====
| Rank | Player | To | Fee | Date | Ref |
|---|---|---|---|---|---|
| 1 | (Denmark) Matt O'Riley | (England) Brighton & Hove Albion | £30,000,000 | 26 August 2024 | |
| 2 | (Scotland) Kieran Tierney | (England) Arsenal | £25,000,000 | 8 August 2019 | |
| 2 | (Portugal) Jota | (Saudi Arabia) Al-Ittihad | £25,000,000 | 3 July 2023 | |
| 3 | (Belgium) Arne Engels | (England) West Ham United | £22,000,000 | 15 August 2026 | |
| 4 | (France) Moussa Dembélé | (France) Olympique Lyonnais | £20,000,000 | 31 August 2018 | |
| 5 | (Germany) Nicolas Kühn | (Italy) Como | £16,500,000 | 11 July 2025 | |
| 6 | (France) Odsonne Édouard | (England) Crystal Palace | £14,000,000 | 31 August 2021 | |
| 7 | (Norway) Kristoffer Ajer | (England) Brentford | £13,500,000 | 21 July 2021 | |
| 7 | (Netherlands) Virgil van Dijk | (England) Southampton | £13,500,000 | 1 September 2015 | |
| 8 | (Kenya) Victor Wanyama | (England) Southampton | £12,500,000 | 11 July 2013 | |
| 9 | (England) Fraser Forster | (England) Southampton | £10,000,000 | 8 August 2014 | |
| 9 | (Israel) Liel Abada | (United States) Charlotte | £10,000,000 | 8 March 2024 | |
| 9 | (Japan) Daizen Maeda | (England) Ipswich Town | £10,000,000 | 25 July 2026 | |
| 9 | (Netherlands) Jeremie Frimpong | (Germany) Bayer Leverkusen | £10,000,000 | 27 January 2021 | |
| 9 | (Japan) Kyogo Furuhashi | (France) Stade Rennais | £10,000,000 | 27 January 2025 | |
| 10 | (Republic of Ireland) Aiden McGeady | (Russia) Spartak Moscow | £9,500,000 | 12 August 2010 | |
| 11 | (Japan) Reo Hatate | (England) Burnley | £9,000,000 | 1 September 2026 | |
| 12 | (Croatia) Josip Juranović | (Germany) Union Berlin | £7,500,000 | 22 January 2023 | |
| 13 | (Scotland) Stuart Armstrong | (England) Southampton | £7,000,000 | 26 June 2018 | |
| 13 | (Republic of Ireland) Adam Idah | (Wales) Swansea City | £7,000,000 | 1 September 2025 | |
| 14 | (Bulgaria) Stiliyan Petrov | (England) Aston Villa | £6,500,000 | 30 August 2006 | |
| 15 | (South Korea) Ki Sung-Yueng | (Wales) Swansea City | £6,000,000 | 24 August 2012 | |
| 15 | (Australia) Mark Viduka | (England) Leeds United | £6,000,000 | 2 July 2000 | |
| 16 | (England) Gary Hooper | (England) Norwich City | £5,500,000 | 26 July 2013 | |
| 17 | (Sweden) Carl Starfelt | (Spain) Celta Vigo | £5,000,000 | 10 August 2023 | |
| 18 | (Netherlands) Pierre van Hooijdonk | (England) Nottingham Forest | £4,500,000 | 10 March 1997 | |
| 18 | (Argentina) Alexandro Bernabei | (Brazil) Internacional | £4,500,000 | 20 January 2025 | |
| 18 | (Italy) Paolo Di Canio | (England) Sheffield Wednesday | £4,500,000 | 6 August 1997 | |

== Managerial records ==
- First manager: Willie Maley, from 1897 to 1940.
- Longest-serving manager by time: Willie Maley, 42 years and 9 months (April 1897 to 1 January 1940).
- Shortest-serving manager by time: Wilfried Nancy, 33 days (3 December 2025 to 5 January 2026).
- Shortest-serving manager by matches: Wilfried Nancy, 8 matches.

== Club records ==
=== Matches ===
==== Firsts ====
- First match: vs. Rangers, Friendly, Won 5–2, Celtic Park (Glasgow), (H), 28 May 1888
- First Scottish Cup match: vs. Shettleston, Won 5–1, Celtic Park (Glasgow), (H), 1 September 1888
- First League match: vs. Heart of Midlothian, Won 5–0, Tynecastle Stadium (Edinburgh), (A), 23 August 1890
- First League Cup match: vs. Hibernian, Lost 2–4, Easter Road (Edinburgh), (H), 21 September 1946
- First European match: vs. Valencia, Lost 2–4, Inter-Cities Fairs Cup, Mestalla (Spain), (A), 26 September 1962

=== Wins ===
- Record win: 11–0 (against Dundee, 26 October 1895)
- Record League win: 11–0 (against Dundee, 26 October 1895)
- Record away win: 9–0 (against Dundee United, 28 August 2022)
- Record away League win: 9–0 (against Dundee United, 28 August 2022)
- Record Scottish Cup win: 8–0 (against Cowlairs, 22 September 1888)
- Record League Cup win: 10–0 (against Hamilton Academical, 11 September 1968)
- Record European win: 9–0 (against KPV Kokkola, 16 September 1970)

==== Defeats ====
- Record defeat: 0–8 (against Motherwell, 30 April 1937)
- Record League defeat: 0–8 (against Motherwell, 30 April 1937)
- Record Scottish Cup defeat:
  - 0–4 (against Rangers, 14 April 1928)
  - 0–4 (against St. Mirren, 4 April 1959)
- Record League Cup defeat:
  - 2–6 (against Clyde, 23 March 1946)
  - 0–4 (against Rangers, 31 August 1955)
- Record European defeat: 0–7 (against Barcelona, 13 September 2016)

=== Goals ===
- Most League goals scored in a season: 116 goals in the 1915–16 season
- Most goals scored in all competitions in a season: 196 goals in the 1966–67 season

=== Points ===
- Most points in a season (3 points per win): 106 (during the 2016–17 season).
- Most points in a season (2 points per win): 72 (during the 1987–88 season).
- Fewest points in a season (2 points per win):
  - 21 (during the 1896–97 season over 18 games).
  - 25 (during the 1947–48 season over 30 games).

=== Attendances ===
- Record attendance: 147,365 (against Aberdeen, won 2–1, Hampden Park (N), 24 April 1937). (A record for a Football match in Europe)
- Record Scottish League home attendance: 83,500 (against Rangers, won 3–0, Celtic Park (H), 1 January 1938). (Note: Newspaper reports at the time indicate that the officially returned attendance was given as 83,500, with an estimated further 10,000 supporters locked out of the ground for safety reasons. However, the ground's capacity was gauged at the time as being around 88,000 and several subsequent sources (including the club's official website) have since revised the attendance up to 92,000.)
- Record European match attendance: 133,961 (against Leeds United, won 2–1, Hampden Park (H), 15 April 1970). (A record for a match in UEFA European competition)

== Other records and statistics ==
- World record for total number of goals scored in a season (competitive games only): 196 (1966–67 season)
- UK record for an unbeaten run in professional football: 69 games (60 won; 9 drawn) 16 May 2016 to 17 December 2017.
- SPL record for an unbeaten run of home matches (League, Europe, Scottish Cup, League Cup) (77), from 2001 to 2004
- 14 consecutive League Cup final appearances, from 1964–65 season to 1977–78 inclusive, a world record for successive appearances in the final of a major football competition
- Most successive Scottish Cup tie wins: 19 (22 January 2017 – 19 December 2020; none going to extra time nor penalties aside from the last match on 19 December 2020)
- Most successive League Cup tie wins: 19 (19 August 1967 – 12 August 1969)
- Most goals scored in one Scottish top-flight league match by one player: 8 goals by Jimmy McGrory against Dunfermline in 9–0 win on 14 January 1928
- Highest score in a domestic British cup final: Celtic 7–1 Rangers, Scottish League Cup Final 1957
- Fastest hat-trick in European Club Football – Mark Burchill vs Jeunesse Esch in 2000; 3 minutes (between 12th minute and 15th minute), a record at the time
- Earliest SPL Championship won: won with 8 games remaining in 2017 (equalling all-time Scottish top-flight record set by Rangers in 1929)
- Biggest margin of victory in the SPL. 9–0 against Aberdeen, 6 November 2010
- Celtic and Hibernian hold the record for the biggest transfer fee between two Scottish clubs. Celtic bought Scott Brown from Hibernian on 16 May 2007 for £4.4m
- Most expensive transfer from Scottish football to another country, Kieran Tierney to Arsenal, August 2019, for about £25 million.
- First weekly club publication in the UK, The Celtic View
- First European club to field a player from the Indian sub-continent, Mohammed Salim
- First British club to reach the final of the European Cup, and the only Scottish, and first British team to win the European Cup

== European statistics ==
- Most appearances: Scott Brown, 127
- Most goals: Henrik Larsson, 35
- Biggest win: Celtic 9–0 KPV Kokkola, in the European Cup, 16 September 1970
- Biggest defeat: Barcelona 7–0 Celtic in the UEFA Champions League, 13 September 2016
- Highest home attendance (Hampden Park): 136,505, against Leeds United in the 1969–70 European Cup (Note: The home leg of Celtic's 1970 European Cup semi-final tie against Leeds United was switched from Celtic Park (which had a capacity at the time of around 80,000) to Hampden Park due to the expected high demand for tickets.)

(Celtic Park): 77,240, against Fiorentina in the 1969–70 European Cup

== See also ==
- Celtic F.C.
- Celtic F.C. in European football
- Celtic Park
- List of Celtic F.C. players
- Lennoxtown Training Centre
- Celtic F.C. Reserve and Youth squads
- Celtic F.C. and World War I
- Sport in Scotland
- Football in Scotland
