= 1945–46 Celtic F.C. season =

Celtic
1945–46 season
- Manager: Jimmy McGrory
- Stadium: Celtic Park
- Southern League First Division: 4th
- Victory Cup: Semi-final
- Southern League Cup: Group stage
Home colours

During the 1945–46 Scottish football season, Celtic competed in the Southern League First Division.

== Competitions ==
=== Southern League Division A ===
==== League table ====
Pos	Team	Pld	W	D	L	GF	GA	GD	Pts
2	Hibernian	30	17	6	7	67	37	+30	40
3	Aberdeen	30	16	6	8	73	41	+32	38
4	Celtic	30	12	11	7	55	44	+11	35
5	Clyde	30	11	9	10	64	54	+10	31
6	Motherwell	30	11	9	10	54	55	−1	31

==== Matches ====
11 August 1945 Division A	Morton	1–1	Celtic	Greenock
				Stadium: Cappielow Park

16 August 1945 Division A	Queen's Park	2–0	Celtic	Glasgow
				Stadium: Hampden Park

18 August 1945 Division A	Celtic	2–2	Clyde	Glasgow
				Stadium: Celtic Park

1 September 1945 Division A	Celtic	1–1	Aberdeen	Glasgow
				Stadium: Celtic Park; Attendance: 26,000

8 September 1945 Division A	Rangers	5–3	Celtic	Glasgow
				Stadium: Ibrox Park

15 September 1945 Division A	Celtic	2–0	Hamilton Academical	Glasgow
				Stadium: Celtic Park

22 September 1945 Division A	Hearts	2–2	Celtic	Edinburgh
				Stadium: Tynecastle Park; Attendance: 14,000

29 September 1945 Division A	Celtic	2–0	Queen of the South	Glasgow
				Stadium: Celtic Park

6 October 1945 Division A	Celtic	4–1	Partick Thistle	Glasgow
				Stadium: Celtic Park

13 October 1945 Division A	Third Lanark	0–2	Celtic	Glasgow
				Stadium: Cathkin Park

20 October 1945 Division A	Celtic	2–2	St Mirren	Glasgow
				Stadium: Celtic Park

27 October 1945 Division A	Celtic	2–1	Falkirk	Glasgow
				Stadium: Celtic Park

3 November 1945 Division A	Hibernian	1–1	Celtic	Edinburgh
				Stadium: Easter Road

10 November 1945 Division A	Celtic	3–0	Motherwell	Glasgow
				Stadium: Celtic Park

17 November 1945 Division A	Kilmarnock	2–1	Celtic	Kilmarnock
				Stadium: Rugby Park

24 November 1945 Division A	Celtic	2–1	Morton	Glasgow
				Stadium: Celtic Park

1 December 1945 Division A	Clyde	3–3	Celtic	Glasgow
				Stadium: Shawfield Stadium

8 December 1945 Division A	Celtic	3–3	Queen's Park	Glasgow
				Stadium: Celtic Park

15 December 1945 Division A	Aberdeen	1–1	Celtic	Aberdeen
				Stadium: Pittodrie Park

22 December 1945 Division A	Hamilton Academical	0–1	Celtic	Hamilton
				Stadium: Douglas Park

29 December 1945 Division A	Celtic	3–5	Heart of Midlothian	Glasgow
				Stadium: Celtic Park; Attendance: 15,000

1 January 1946 Division A	Celtic	0–1	Rangers	Glasgow
				Stadium: Celtic Park

2 January 1946 Division A	Queen of the South	0–0	Celtic	Dumfries
				Stadium: Palmerston Park

5 January 1946 Division A	Partick Thistle	0–3	Celtic	Glasgow
				Stadium: Firhill Park

12 January 1946 Division A	Celtic	3–2	Third Lanark	Glasgow
				Stadium: Celtic Park

19 January 1946 Division A	St Mirren	1–2	Celtic	Paisley
				Stadium: St Mirren Park, Love Street

26 January 1946 Division A	Falkirk	4–2	Celtic	Falkirk
				Stadium: Brockville Park

2 February 1946 Division A	Celtic	0–1	Hibernian	Glasgow
				Stadium: Celtic Park

9 February 1946 Division A	Motherwell	1–3	Celtic	Motherwell
				Stadium: Fir Park

16 February 1946 Division A	Celtic	1–1	Kilmarnock	Glasgow
				Stadium: Celtic Park

=== Scottish Victory Cup ===
20 April 1946 First round first leg	St Johnstone	2–8	Celtic	Perth
				Stadium: Muirton Park

20 April 1946 First round second leg	Celtic	5–0	St Johnstone	Glasgow
				Stadium: Celtic Park

4 May 1946 Second round	Celtic	3–0	Queen of the South	Glasgow
				Stadium: Celtic Park

18 May 1946 Third Round	Raith Rovers	0–2	Celtic	Kirkcaldy
				Stadium: Stark's Park

1 June 1946 Semi-final	Celtic	0–0	Rangers	Glasgow
				Stadium: Hampden Park; Attendance: 65,000

5 June 1946 Semi-final Replay	Rangers	2–0	Celtic	Glasgow
				Stadium: Hampden Park; Attendance: 50,000

=== Southern League Cup ===
23 February 1946 Group	Queen's Park	3–1	Celtic	Glasgow
				Stadium: Hampden Park

2 March 1946 Group	Celtic	4–0	Clyde	Glasgow
				Stadium: Celtic Park

9 March 1946 Group	Third Lanark	0–4	Celtic	Glasgow
				Stadium: Cathkin Park

16 March 1946 Group	Celtic	2–0	Queen's Park	Glasgow
				Stadium: Celtic Park

23 March 1946 Group	Clyde	6–2	Celtic	Glasgow
				Stadium: Shawfield Stadium

30 March 1946 Group	Celtic	1–1	Third Lanark	Glasgow
				Stadium: Celtic Park
