= Soccer Six =

- Founded: 1982
- Region: Midlands (1982); England (The Football Association) (1983–90)
- Teams: 8 (1982); 22 (1988)
- Related competitions: National Fives; Tennents' Sixes
- Current champions: Luton Town (1st title)
- Most championships: Birmingham City (two titles)
- Broadcaster(s): BBC; BSkyB (1990)

The Soccer Six was an annual indoor football tournament organised the Football League in England. The first year of the competition was for the Midlands clubs only, but expanded for clubs nationwide every year after.

== History ==
The competition was inspired by the success of Major Indoor Soccer League that ran between 1978 and 1992 in the United States. The popularity of the Soccer Six coincided with the five-year ban English clubs faced from UEFA competitions in 1985.

A pilot tournament sponsored by Atari was run for football clubs in the Midlands at the NEC in Birmingham in 1982. The Football League opened the competition to all First Division clubs in 1982. All 21 top flight teams entered the competition in 1988 plus Manchester City of the Second Division. The venue was switched to the GMEX in Manchester in 1986.

The tournament took place in December of each year until it was cancelled in 1991. Tournament highlights were covered by the BBC's Sportsnight. Sponsorship by Courage and finally Guinness followed. Matches lasted a total of 15 minute split into two halves and had the rolling substitutions rule.

Other basic rules included a team must always have a player in the opposition half, a player could not shoot inside the marked yellow box and if the goalkeeper passed the ball to his team mate, that player could not pass back to the goalkeeper. The sin-bin was in use for the more serious offenders.

== Awards ==
| Season | Best Player | Best Young Player | Ref |
|---|---|---|---|
| 1987–88 | Tommy Gaynor (Notts Forest) | Neil Webb (Notts Forest) | |
| 1988–89 | Peter Shirtliff (Charlton Ath) | | |

== List of Finals ==
| Season | Winners | Score | Runners up | Ref |
|---|---|---|---|---|
| 1981–82 | Birmingham City | 1–0 | Wolverhampton Wanderers | |
| 1982–83 | Birmingham City | 2–2 (4–3 p) | Ipswich Town | |
| 1983–84 | Arsenal | 1-1 | Ipswich Town | |
| 1984–85 | | | | |
| 1985–86 | Tottenham Hotspur | penalties | Arsenal | |
| 1986–87 | Oxford United | 2–1 | Arsenal | |
| 1987–88 | Nottingham Forest | 0–0 (2–1 p) | Manchester United | |
| 1988–89 | Charlton Athletic | 2–1 | Nottingham Forest | |
| 1989–90 | | | | |
| 1990–91 | Luton Town | 4–0 | Liverpool | |

== Competing teams ==
- 1982–83: Arsenal, Birmingham City, Everton, Ipswich Town, Manchester City, Nottingham Forest, Southampton, Swansea City
- 1986–87: Arsenal, Aston Villa, Chelsea, Luton Town, Manchester City, Manchester United, Newcastle United, Nottingham Forest, Oxford United, Sheffield Wednesday, Tottenham Hotspur
- 1987–88: Arsenal, Chelsea, Coventry City, Everton, Luton Town, Manchester City, Manchester United, Newcastle United, Nottingham Forest, Norwich City, Oxford United, Sheffield Wednesday, Southampton, Tottenham Hotspur, Watford, Wimbledon

== See also ==
- Tennents' Sixes
- National Fives
- Courage Brewery
- Guinness
