= 1927–28 Celtic F.C. season =

Celtic
1927–28 season
- Manager: Willie Maley
- Stadium: Celtic Park
- Scottish First Division: 2nd
- Scottish Cup: Finalists

The 1927–28 Scottish football season was Celtic's 40th season of competitive football, in which they competed in the Scottish First Division and the Scottish Cup.

After having won either the league or the cup in the previous three campaigns, Celtic ended the season runner-up in both competitions. In the league they ended five points below champions Rangers, to whom they also lost the Scottish Cup final, 4-0.

== Competitions ==
=== Scottish First Division ===
==== League table ====
Pos	Team	Pld	W	D	L	GF	GA	GD	Pts
1	Rangers	38	26	8	4	109	36	+73	60
2	Celtic	38	23	9	6	93	39	+54	55
3	Motherwell	38	23	9	6	92	46	+46	55
4	Heart of Midlothian	38	20	7	11	89	50	+39	47
5	St Mirren	38	18	8	12	77	76	+1	44

Source: "1927-1928 Division 1 - SPFL Archive". SPFL.

==== Matches ====
13 August 1927 First Division	Celtic	3–0	Hibernian	Glasgow
				Stadium: Celtic Park; Attendance: 18,000

16 August 1927 First Division	Celtic	6–1	Kilmarnock	Glasgow
				Stadium: Celtic Park; Attendance: 15,000

20 August 1927 First Division	Hamilton Academical	0–0	Celtic	Hamilton
				Stadium: Douglas Park; Attendance: 10,000

27 August 1927 First Division	Celtic	3–0	Falkirk	Glasgow
				Stadium: Celtic Park; Attendance: 15,000

3 September 1927 First Division	Raith Rovers	0–3	Celtic	Kirkcaldy
				Stadium: Stark's Park; Attendance: 14,000

10 September 1927 First Division	Celtic	3–0	Queen's Park	Glasgow
				Stadium: Celtic Park; Attendance: 12,000

17 September 1927 First Division	Dunfermline Athletic	1–1	Celtic	Dunfermline
				Stadium: East End Park; Attendance: 8,000

24 September 1927 First Division	Celtic	3–0	Clyde	Glasgow
				Stadium: Celtic Park; Attendance: 10,000

1 October 1927 First Division	Dundee	1–4	Celtic	Dundee
				Stadium: Dens Park; Attendance: 13,000

15 October 1927 First Division	Rangers	1–0	Celtic	Glasgow
				Stadium: Ibrox Park; Attendance: 6,000

22 October 1927 First Division	Aberdeen	3–1	Celtic	Aberdeen
				Stadium: Pittodrie Park; Attendance: 20,000

29 October 1927 First Division	Celtic	6–0	St Mirren	Glasgow
				Stadium: Celtic Park; Attendance: 7,000

5 November 1927 First Division	Celtic	3–2	Airdrieonians	Glasgow
				Stadium: Celtic Park; Attendance: 10,000

12 November 1927 First Division	Hearts	2–2	Celtic	Edinburgh
				Stadium: Tynecastle Park; Attendance: 34,000

19 November 1927 First Division	Celtic	1–1	Cowdenbeath	Glasgow
				Stadium: Celtic Park; Attendance: 5,000

26 November 1927 First Division	Bo'ness	0–1	Celtic	Bo'ness
				Stadium: Newton Park; Attendance: 6,000

3 December 1927 First Division	Celtic	1–2	Motherwell	Glasgow
				Stadium: Celtic Park; Attendance: 20,000

10 December 1927 First Division	St Johnstone	3–5	Celtic	Perth
				Stadium: Muirton Park; Attendance: 3,000

17 December 1927 First Division	Celtic	0–0	Partick Thistle	Glasgow
				Stadium: Celtic Park; Attendance: 20,000

24 December 1927 First Division	Hibernian	2–2	Celtic	Edinburgh
				Stadium: Easter Road; Attendance: 10,000

2 January 1928 First Division	Celtic	1–0	Rangers	Glasgow
				Stadium: Celtic Park; Attendance: 70,000

3 January 1928 First Division	Queen's Park	1–3	Celtic	Glasgow
				Stadium: Hampden Park; Attendance: 15,000

7 January 1928 First Division	Falkirk	1–3	Celtic	Falkirk
				Stadium: Brockville Park; Attendance: 12,000

14 January 1928 First Division	Celtic	9–0	Dunfermline Athletic	Glasgow
				Stadium: Celtic Park; Attendance: 3,000

28 January 1928 First Division	Kilmarnock	2–2	Celtic	Kilmarnock
				Stadium: Rugby Park; Attendance: 18,000

11 February 1928 First Division	Clyde	0–1	Celtic	Glasgow
				Stadium: Shawfield Stadium; Attendance: 15,000

14 February 1928 First Division	Celtic	3–1	Dundee	Glasgow
				Stadium: Celtic Park; Attendance: 12,000

21 February 1928 First Division	St Mirren	0–2	Celtic	Paisley
				Stadium: St Mirren Park, Love Street; Attendance: 8,000

25 February 1928 First Division	Celtic	1–1	Aberdeen	Glasgow
				Stadium: Celtic Park; Attendance: 8,000

6 March 1928 First Division	Celtic	4–0	Hamilton Academical	Glasgow
				Stadium: Celtic Park; Attendance: 10,000

17 March 1928 First Division	Celtic	2–1	Hearts	Glasgow
				Stadium: Celtic Park; Attendance: 12,000

26 March 1928 First Division	Cowdenbeath	0–2	Celtic	Cowdenbeath
				Stadium: Central Park; Attendance: 6,000

31 March 1928 First Division	Celtic	4–1	Bo'ness	Glasgow
				Stadium: Celtic Park; Attendance: 6,000

7 April 1928 First Division	Motherwell	3–1	Celtic	Motherwell
				Stadium: Fir Park; Attendance: 15,000

9 April 1928 First Division	Airdrieonians	3–1	Celtic	Airdrie
				Stadium: Broomfield Park; Attendance: 8,000

18 April 1928 First Division	Celtic	3–0	St Johnstone	Glasgow
				Stadium: Celtic Park; Attendance: 3,000

21 April 1928 First Division	Partick Thistle	3–3	Celtic	Glasgow
				Stadium: Firhill Park; Attendance: 20,000

23 April 1928 First Division	Celtic	0–3	Raith Rovers	Glasgow
				Stadium: Celtic Park; Attendance: 4,000

=== Scottish Cup ===
21 January 1928 First round	Celtic	3–1	Bathgate	Glasgow
				Stadium: Celtic Park; Attendance: 3,000

4 February 1928 Second round	Keith	1–6	Celtic	Keith
				Stadium: Kynoch Park; Attendance: 5,820

18 February 1928 Third round	Celtic	2–0	Alloa Athletic	Glasgow
				Stadium: Celtic Park; Attendance: 7,000

3 March 1928 Fourth round	Motherwell	0–2	Celtic	Motherwell
				Stadium: Fir Park; Attendance: 23,000

24 March 1928 Semi-final	Queen's Park	1–2	Celtic	Glasgow
			Adam McLean; Jimmy McGrory	Stadium: Ibrox Park; Attendance: 54,000

14 April 1928 Final	Rangers	4–0	Celtic	Glasgow
				Stadium: Hampden Park; Attendance: 118,115

=== Friendly ===
3 October 1927	Celtic	4–1	Cardiff City	Glasgow
	McGrory 25' 44' 56' 80'		Curtis 75'	Stadium: Celtic Park; Attendance: 10,000; Referee: T. Dougray

- Challenge match between the Scottish Cup holders and English FA Cup holders.
