= London Five-a-Sides =

- Founded: 1954
- Abolished: 1995
- Region: London, England (The Sports Council)
- Last champions: Wycombe Wanderers (2nd title)
- Most championships: Queen's Park Rangers (five titles)
- Broadcaster(s): ITV; Sky TV (1993–95)

The Evening Standard London Five-a-Sides was an annual indoor football tournament organised by the Sports Council (now Sport England). As the competition name suggests it featured Football League clubs from the capital city. The latter years of the event was open to Football League clubs outside London.

== History ==
The competition usually took place towards end of the domestic football season in April or May. The competition was on six-year hiatus from 1961 to 1966 and then a seven-year break between 1986 and 1992.

The first venue of choice was the Empress Hall, Earls Court. The second edition was transferred to the Harringay Arena. The event moved to Empire Pool Wembley in 1959. It shared a home with the National Five-a Side tournament that ran from 1968 to 1986.

ITV (Thames Television) covered the best of the action on its late evening show Midweek Sports Special for London and surrounding areas only. Commentary came from Brian Moore. The final three editions in the 1990s were shown by Sky TV to a wider audience.

Originally, only First Division and Second Division clubs from the Football League were eligible to participate.

== List of Finals ==
Years	Winners	Score	Runners up	Ref
1954	Charlton Athletic	3–1	Tottenham Hotspur	
1955	Fulham	4–1	West Ham United	
1956	Tottenham Hotspur	2–1	Fulham	
1957	Fulham	3–2	West Ham United	
1958	Leyton Orient	1–0	Crystal Palace	
1959	Crystal Palace	4–1	Charlton Athletic	
1960	Tottenham Hotspur	3–1	West Ham United	
No competition between 1961–66
1967	West Ham United	4–0	Arsenal	
1968	Charlton Athletic	2–1	Crystal Palace	
1969	Crystal Palace	2–0	Brentford	
1970	West Ham United	2–1	Tottenham Hotspur	
1971	Queen's Park Rangers	1–0	West Ham United	
1972	Queen's Park Rangers	3–0	Southampton	
1973	Chelsea	2–2 (Pens)	Millwall	
1974	Queen's Park Rangers	2–1	West Ham United	
1975	Charlton Athletic	5–3	Millwall	
1976	Leyton Orient	6–1	Queen's Park Rangers	
1977	Arsenal	2–1 (aet)	West Ham United	
1978	Millwall	3–2	Queen's Park Rangers	
1979	Millwall	3–2	Crystal Palace	
1980	Queen's Park Rangers	2–1	Charlton Athletic	
1981	Arsenal	2–2 (2–1 p)	West Ham United	
1982	Fulham	2–0	Charlton Athletic	
1983	Millwall	3–2	Brentford	
1984	West Ham United	2–1	Tottenham Hotspur	
1985	Queen's Park Rangers	3–3 (Pens)	Arsenal	
No competition between 1986–92
1993	Watford	1–1 (1–0 p)	Wimbledon	
1994	Wycombe Wanderers	0–0 (1–0 s)	Wimbledon	
1995	Wycombe Wanderers	0–0; Shootout	Luton Town	

== Titles by Club ==
Team	Finals Won	Finals Lost	Winning years	Losing Years
Queen's Park Rangers	5	2	1971, 1972, 1974, 1980, 1985	1976, 1978
West Ham United	3	7	1967, 1970, 1984	1955, 1957, 1960, 1971, 1974, 1977, 1981
Charlton Athletic	3	3	1954, 1968, 1975	1959, 1980, 1982
Millwall	3	2	1978, 1979, 1983	1973, 1975
Fulham	3	1	1955, 1957, 1982	1956
Crystal Palace	2	3	1959, 1969	1958, 1968, 1979
Tottenham Hotspur	2	3	1956, 1960	1954, 1970, 1984
Arsenal	2	2	1977, 1981	1967, 1985
Leyton Orient	2	–	1958, 1976	
Wycombe Wanderers	2	–	1994, 1995	
Chelsea	1	–	1973	
Watford	1	–	1993	
Brentford	–	2		1969, 1983
Wimbledon	–	2		1993, 1994
Luton Town	–	1		1995
Southampton	–	1		1972
