= 1990–91 in English football =

111th season of competitive football in England

Football in England
- Season: 1990–91

Men's football
- First Division: Arsenal
- Second Division: Oldham Athletic
- Third Division: Cambridge United
- Fourth Division: Darlington
- Football Conference: Barnet
- FA Cup: Tottenham Hotspur
- Associate Members' Cup: Birmingham City
- League Cup: Sheffield Wednesday
- Charity Shield: Liverpool & Manchester United

The 1990–91 season was the 111th season of competitive football in England. In the Football League First Division, Arsenal emerged victorious as champions.

== Diary of the season ==
1 July 1990 – England beat Cameroon 3–2 in the World Cup quarter finals, securing qualification to the semi–finals for the first time since the 1966 tournament.

2 July 1990 –

- – Leeds United prepare for their First Division comeback by signing midfielder Gary McAllister from Leicester City for £1million.
- – Swindon Town win an appeal against their relegation to the Third Division, but miss out on promotion to the First Division and remain in the Second Division. Their place in the First Division goes to Sunderland.

3 July 1990 – Chelsea pay a club record £1.6million for Wimbledon winger Dennis Wise.

4 July 1990 – England's World Cup hopes are ended in a semi-final defeat by West Germany, with Chris Waddle and Stuart Pearce both missing penalties.

5 July 1990 – Chelsea sign Norwich City midfielder Andy Townsend for £1.2million.

7 July 1990 – England lose 2–1 to host nation Italy in the World Cup third place play–off.

16 July 1990 – Graham Taylor, manager of Aston Villa, is appointed as successor to Bobby Robson as the England manager.

18 July 1990 – Derby County sell defender Paul Blades to Norwich City for £700,000.

19 July 1990 – England striker Mark Hateley ends six years overseas and joins Scottish league champions Rangers in a £1million move from AS Monaco. He had played on the continent since his move from Portsmouth to AC Milan in 1984.

20 July 1990 – Manchester City pay a club record £1 million for Watford goalkeeper Tony Coton.

22 July 1990 – Czechoslovak national coach Jozef Vengloš is appointed as the new manager of Aston Villa, and becomes the first foreign manager in the First Division.

31 July 1990 – Aldershot F.C. in the Fourth Division are wound up in the High Court, condemned as "hopelessly insolvent" with debts of nearly £500,000 by the Official Receiver.

1 August 1990 –

- – The Football League confirms that it will revert to a 22-club First Division for the 1991–92 season, while total league membership will be increased to 94 clubs for the 1992–93 season, with the Second, Third and Fourth Divisions each having 24 clubs.
- – Sheffield Wednesday sell striker Dalian Atkinson to Real Sociedad of Spain for £1million, where he will be playing alongside the former Liverpool striker John Aldridge. Long-serving Manchester United defender Mike Duxbury joins Blackburn Rovers on a free transfer.

6 August 1990 – Arsenal sign Swedish winger Anders Limpar from Italian side Cremonese for £1million.

7 August 1990 – Aldershot are saved from closure by a £200,000 rescue package put together by 19-year-old property developer Spencer Trethewy, which means that they will be able to start the new Football League season.

15 August 1990 – Crystal Palace sign Wimbledon defender Eric Young for £850,000.

16 August 1990 – Crystal Palace further strengthen their defence with a £400,000 move for Charlton Athletic, their Selhurst Park tenants, for John Humphrey.

18 August 1990 – Liverpool and Manchester United share the Charity Shield after a 1–1 draw at Wembley.

23 August 1990 – Oldham Athletic pay a club record £460,000 for Nottingham Forest striker David Currie. Leeds United are warned that they face expulsion from the Football League if measures aimed by the Football Association at curbing incidents of hooliganism involving the club's fans fail.

24 August 1990 – Everton sign midfielder Mike Milligan from Oldham Athletic for £1million.

25 August 1990 – Liverpool begin their defence of the First Division title with a 3–1 away win against recently promoted Sheffield United.Arsenal begin their challenge for a second league title in three seasons by beating Wimbledon 3–0 at Plough Lane. Leeds United enjoy a fine First Division comeback with a 3–2 away win over Everton. Key games on the opening day of the Second Division campaign include a 4–2 home win over Blackburn Rovers for newly promoted Bristol City and Oxford United's 5–2 home win over Port Vale. In the Fourth Division, Walsall draw 2–2 with Torquay United in their first game at the new Bescot Stadium.

28 August 1990 – Manchester United and Leeds United meet for the first time since April 1982, and battle out a goalless draw at Elland Road in the First Division – a repeat of the last clash between the two sides.

31 August 1990 – The first month of the English league season ends with Arsenal and Liverpool sharing the lead in the First Division after two games. The Second Division leaders are Oldham Athletic.

1 September 1990 – Newly promoted First Division side Sunderland achieve a shock 2–1 league win over FA Cup holders Manchester United at Roker Park. Liverpool's 2–1 home win over Aston Villa leaves them with the only 100% record in the First Division after three games. Leeds go second with a 3–0 home win over Norwich City. Everton's 1–0 defeat to Manchester City at Maine Road leaves with without a point from their opening three games. There are victories in the Second Division for promotion favourites Millwall, Sheffield Wednesday, Oldham and West Ham.

4 September 1990 – The only league action of the day sees a Mark Robins goal give Manchester United a 1–0 away win over Luton Town.

8 September 1990 – Liverpool extend their winning start to the season to four games with a 2–1 away win over Wimbledon. Mark Robins is the star of the show for Manchester United once again, scoring twice in a 3–1 home win over QPR. Crystal Palace go second with a 3–0 win at Norwich. Paul Gascoigne scores a hat-trick for Tottenham in their 3–0 home win over Derby. Everton claim their first point of the season with a 1–1 draw at home to Arsenal. Oldham have a 100% record after four games, remaining top of the Second Division with a 1–0 win at Charlton.

10 September 1990 – Manager Joe Jordan leaves Bristol City to return to his native Scotland and become manager of Hearts.

12 September 1990 – England beat Hungary 1–0 in a friendly at Wembley, the first game under Graham Taylor's management.

15 September 1990 – Arsenal keep up the pressure on Liverpool with a 4–1 home win over Chelsea, as do Tottenham with a 2–0 win at Leeds. Oldham make it five consecutive wins in the Second Division by beating Oxford 3–0 at Boundary Park.

16 September 1990 – Peter Beardsley scores a hat-trick for Liverpool in their 4–0 league win over Manchester United at Anfield.

18 September 1990 – Oldham drop points for the first time this season with a 1–1 draw at home to Charlton, who claim their first point of the season in the process.

22 September 1990 – Liverpool extend their winning start to the season to six games by winning the Merseyside derby 3–2 at Goodison Park. Arsenal keep up the pressure and hold onto second place with a 2–0 win at Nottingham Forest. Oldham remain top of the Second Division with a 1–0 win over Middlesbrough at Ayresome Park. Swindon Town draw level with the top three by beating local rivals Oxford 4–2 at the Manor Ground.

25 September 1990 – Ian Wright and Mark Bright both score hat-tricks for Crystal Palace in their 8–0 home win over Southend United in the League Cup second round first leg at Selhurst Park.

26 September 1990 – Paul Gascoigne scores four goals for Tottenham in their 5–0 win over Hartlepool United (managed by former Tottenham defender Cyril Knowles) in the League Cup second round first leg at White Hart Lane.

29 September 1990 – Liverpool's 1–0 win over Sunderland at Roker Park gives them a 100% record after seven games, and they extend their lead to six points after Arsenal are held to a 2–2 draw at Leeds. Tottenham and Crystal Palace are level on points with George Graham's men. Manchester United's title hopes are dented when a Stuart Pearce goal gives Nottingham Forest a 1–0 win at Old Trafford. Luton climb to sixth place with a 3–1 win over Norwich at Carrow Road. Sheffield United and Derby occupy the bottom places, both winless after seven games. Oldham remain top of the Second Division despite being held to a goalless draw at West Bromwich Albion.

30 September 1990 – Liverpool, with a 100% record after seven games, are First Division leaders by six points at the end of September. The bottom two places are occupied by Sheffield United and Derby County, who have both yet to win a league game this season. In the Second Division, Oldham Athletic lead the way with 20 points from their opening eight games. The other two automatic promotion places are occupied by Sheffield Wednesday and Notts County, and the playoff zone is occupied by West Ham United, Bristol City (in contention for a second successive promotion), Swindon Town and Brighton.

1 October 1990 – Notts County go second in the Second Division with a 1–0 win at Port Vale, boosting their hopes of a second successive promotion.

4 October 1990 – Peter Taylor, former managerial partner of Brian Clough, dies suddenly of pulmonary fibrosis whilst on holiday in Costa De Los Pinos, Majorca, at the age of 62.

6 October 1990 – In the biggest Second Division win of the season, West Ham United beat Hull City 7–1 at Upton Park.Wolves boost their hopes of a third promotion in four seasons by beating Bristol City 4–0 at home, with Steve Bull scoring a hat-trick. In the First Division, Southampton and Chelsea draw 3–3 in a thrilling match at The Dell. Liverpool make it eight consecutive wins by beating Derby 2–0 at Anfield, while Arsenal keep the gap between themselves and the leaders at six points by beating Norwich 2–0 at Highbury.

7 October 1990 – The pressure mounts on Everton manager Colin Harvey after a 3–1 defeat at Nottingham Forest leaves his side third from bottom in the First Division after just one win and five points from their opening eight games.

12 October 1990 – West Ham United strengthen their promotion bid with a £600,000 move for Luton Town defender Tim Breacker.

20 October 1990 – 21 of the 22 players on the pitch brawl in Arsenal's 1–0 league win over Manchester United at Old Trafford. In their ninth league game of the season, Liverpool drop points for the first time when Norwich City hold them to a 1–1 draw at Carrow Road. The gap between first and second place is cut to four points as a result. Tottenham keep up the pressure with a 4–0 home win over Sheffield United, with Paul Walsh scoring a hat-trick. The bottom two clubs are still winless after nine games.

24 October 1990 – Aston Villa beat Italian favourites Inter Milan 2–0 at Villa Park in the UEFA Cup second round first leg. In the Second Division, Newcastle's promotion hopes are hit by a 3–1 home defeat to struggling Charlton.

27 October 1990 – The Manchester derby at Maine Road ends in a 3–3 draw between City and United. Liverpool return to their winning ways with a 2–0 home win over Chelsea. Arsenal keep up the pressure with a 1–0 home win over Sunderland at Highbury, as do Tottenham with a 2–1 win at Nottingham Forest, and Crystal Palace with a thrilling 4–3 home win over Wimbledon. The top four in the First Division are all unbeaten after 10 games, as are the Second Division's top two clubs Oldham and West Ham after 14 games, and Fourth Division leaders Torquay after 13 games.

31 October 1990 – Everton sack manager Colin Harvey after their worst start to a league season leaves them third from bottom in the First Division. Below them are Derby County and winless Sheffield United, while Liverpool remain top with nine wins from their opening 10 games. Arsenal, Tottenham Hotspur and Crystal Palace are their nearest contenders, and the top four are all still undefeated in the league. The Second Division promotion race is heating up, with Oldham Athletic still top of the table and West Ham United having crept up to second place. Sheffield Wednesday occupy the third and final automatic promotion place. Millwall, Wolverhampton Wanderers, Barnsley and Middlesbrough have all climbed into the playoff zone this month. Charlton Athletic are in real danger of a second successive relegation as they occupy second from bottom place in the Second Division with eight defeats from their opening 13 games. The Football League Cup third round action includes a Mick Harford hat-trick for Derby in a 6–0 home win over his old club Sunderland. Manchester United beat Liverpool 3–1 at Old Trafford. Nottingham Forest keep their hopes of a third successive League Cup triumph alive with a 2–1 win at Plymouth.

1 November 1990 – Spencer Trethewy is dismissed from the Aldershot board of directors just three months after saving the club from closure, after it is revealed that he was unable to pay back the £200,000 he borrowed to keep the Hampshire based club afloat.

3 November 1990 – Crystal Palace suffer their first league defeat of the season when they lose 2–0 to Manchester United at Old Trafford. Derby beat Luton 2–1 to make it back-to-back victories in a boost to their survival hopes. Managerless Everton beat QPR 3–0 at Goodison Park.

4 November 1990 – Tottenham's unbeaten league start ends and their title hopes are hit by a major blow when they lose 3–1 at home to Liverpool, who maintain a four-point lead over their nearest challengers Arsenal, while third placed Tottenham are now nine points off the top.

7 November 1990 – Howard Kendall leaves Manchester City to begin his second spell as Everton manager. 34-year-old midfielder Peter Reid is put in temporary charge of Manchester City. Aston Villa's UEFA Cup hopes are ended when Inter Milan overturn a 2–0 Villa lead in the UEFA Cup second round second leg and win 3–0 in the San Siro. Manchester United go through to the quarter-finals of the European Cup Winners' Cup by completing a 5–0 aggregate win over Wrexham.

10 November 1990 – Liverpool extend their lead at the top of the First Division to six points with a 4–0 home win over Luton, while Arsenal can only manage a goalless draw with Crystal Palace at Selhurst Park. Tottenham keep their title hopes alive with a 4–2 home win over Wimbledon. Howard Kendall's return to Everton begins with a goalless draw against Sheffield United at Bramall Lane, which keeps Everton in 17th place and means that their hosts are still bottom of the table and winless after 12 games. Derby hold Manchester United to a goalless draw at the Baseball Ground but miss the chance to climb out of the relegation zone.

11 November 1990 – Leeds go fifth in the First Division with a 3–2 away win over Manchester City.

12 November 1990 – Arsenal are deducted two points and Manchester United lose one point as punishment for last month's player brawl, which increases Liverpool's lead at the top to eight points.

14 November 1990 – Coventry City, 14th in the First Division and on course for their lowest league finish in five years, sack manager John Sillett after more than four years in charge. The only major action of the day is a 1–1 draw between England and the Republic of Ireland in a Euro 92 qualifier at Lansdowne Road.

15 November 1990 – Peter Reid is appointed player-manager of Manchester City on a permanent basis. Terry Butcher returns to England after more than four years with Rangers to become player-manager at Coventry City. 31-year-old Butcher, who was released from his Rangers contract for a fee of £350,000, is the youngest manager in all four divisions of the English league.

17 November 1990 – The first round of the FA Cup is contested. Bury, Reading and Scarborough are all eliminated by non-league opposition. In the First Division, Terry Butcher begins his managerial career with a 1–0 defeat at home to Liverpool, while second placed Arsenal beat Southampton 4–0 to keep up the pressure on the leaders. Sheffield United remain winless and bottom of the table after losing 2–0 to Manchester United at Old Trafford.

21 November 1990 – Cardiff become the fourth league side to be knocked out of the FA Cup by non-league opposition when they lose their first round replay 1–0 to Vauxhall-Opel League side Hayes.

27 November 1990 – Liverpool sign 19-year-old midfielder Don Hutchison from Fourth Division Hartlepool United for £175,000. Second Division bottom club Watford sack manager Colin Lee after eight months in charge.

28 November 1990 – Manchester United beat Arsenal 6–2 at Highbury in a League Cup fourth round tie, in which 19-year-old winger Lee Sharpe scores a hat-trick. It is Arsenal's first competitive defeat of the season. Nottingham Forest's hopes of three League Cup triumphs in a row are ended when they lose 5–4 to Coventry at Highfield Road, with Kevin Gallacher scoring a hat-trick for the winners and Nigel Clough scoring a hat-trick for the losers.

29 November 1990 – Manchester United offer a professional contract to trainee winger Ryan Giggs on his 17th birthday. Giggs, who was born in Cardiff but has lived in Manchester for most of his life, is widely regarded in Old Trafford circles as the finest prospect in English football since George Best.

30 November 1990 – Liverpool remain unbeaten and top of the First Division as November draws to a close, four points ahead of an Arsenal side who are also unbeaten. Sheffield United are still looking for their first league win of the season after 14 games, while Derby County have climbed out of the relegation zone at the expense of Queens Park Rangers. In the Second Division, West Ham United have taken over from Oldham Athletic as Second Division leaders, while Sheffield Wednesday occupy third place. The playoff zone is occupied by Middlesbrough, Wolverhampton Wanderers, Millwall and Notts County. Newly promoted Bristol Rovers stand just two points outside the playoff zone in 10th place, sparking hopes that manager Gerry Francis could soon deliver First Division football to the club for the first time ever.

1 December 1990 – Sheffield United are still looking for a league win 15 games into the season, with just four points to their name, after losing 2–1 at Aston Villa, while Derby's upswing continues and they climb to 14th place with a 2–1 win at Sunderland, who stand 16th. A Lee Sharpe goal gives Manchester United a 1–0 win at Everton, United's first win at Goodison Park since January 1982. There is thrilling action in the Second Division when a 5–4 win for the hosts at Filbert Street sees David Kelly score a hat-trick for Leicester and Micky Quinn score a hat-trick for Newcastle. The result helps lift Leicester clear of the relegation zone, while Newcastle are now 16th in the Second Division and six points adrift of the playoffs, mounting the pressure on manager Jim Smith who had almost delivered Newcastle promotion last season. West Ham remain top of the Second Division with a 3–1 home win over West Bromwich Albion, Port Vale close in on the playoffs with a 5–1 home win over Plymouth, Oldham retain second place with a 6–1 home win over Brighton, and Middlesbrough go third win a 3–0 home win over Hull.

2 December 1990 – Arsenal end Liverpool's unbeaten League run by beating them 3–0 at Highbury, cutting the gap at the top to two points.

4 December 1990 – Luton Town win the Soccer Six at the G-Mex Centre, beating Liverpool 4–0 in the final.

8 December 1990 – Heavy snow causes many Football League and FA Cup fixtures to be postponed, but a decent number of matches in the less seriously affected areas go ahead. Arsenal miss the chance to go ahead at the top of the table on goal difference when they are held to a 1–1 draw at Luton. Tottenham draw 3–3 at home to Sunderland. The first match between Manchester United and Leeds United at Old Trafford for nearly a decade ends in a 1–1 draw. Everton increase Coventry's relegation worries and boost their own chances of staying clear of relegation with a 1–0 win at Goodison Park. West Ham remain firmly in the lead at the top of the Second Division with a 1–0 win at struggling Portsmouth.

13 December 1990 – Southampton pay £1million for a player for the first time in their history by signing midfielder Alan McLoughlin from Swindon Town.

15 December 1990 – Liverpool are four points ahead at the top of the First Division, with a game in hand, after beating Sheffield United 2–0 to leave their hosts winless and still with only four points to their name so far this season, while Arsenal are held to a 2–2 draw at home to Wimbledon. A 10-goal thriller at the Baseball Ground sees Chelsea beat Derby 6–4. QPR remain second from bottom with a 2–1 defeat at home to Nottingham Forest.

19 December 1990 – Arsenal captain Tony Adams is sentenced to four months in prison for drink-driving after being more than three times over the legal alcohol limit when he crashed his car in Southend-on-Sea on 6 May this year. Adams, 24, is also fined £500 and banned from driving for two years.

21 December 1990 – Oldham go top of the Second Division on goal difference with a 5–3 home win over Plymouth.

22 December 1990 – Sheffield United beat Nottingham Forest to win their first First Division game of the season at the seventeenth attempt, but remain bottom of the table. Liverpool remain comfortably in the lead at the top of the table with a 3–2 home win over Southampton. Manchester United win 3–1 at Wimbledon. West Ham miss out on the chance to return to the top of the Second Division with a 1–0 defeat at Barnsley.

23 December 1990 – The last matches before Christmas are played. Arsenal extend their unbeaten start to the season to 18 games with a goalless draw at Aston Villa, although Liverpool are still six points ahead of them and have a game in hand. QPR miss the chance to climb out of the relegation zone when Derby hold them to a 1–1 draw at the Baseball Ground. Leeds hold on to fifth place with a 1–0 win over Sunderland at Roker Park. Three players are sent off in a goalless draw between Leicester and Watford at Filbert Street. In the Third Division, Brentford boost their hopes of winning promotion in Phil Holder's first season in management by beating Wigan Athletic 1–0 at Griffin Park. In the Fourth Division, Carlisle United keep their playoff hopes alive with a 1–0 win over Blackpool, who are now 18th in the table.

26 December 1990 – The Boxing Day action in the First Division sees leaders Liverpool held to a 1–1 draw by QPR at Loftus Road, allowing Arsenal to cut their lead to four points (with a game in hand) by beating Derby 3–0 at Highbury. Coventry boost their survival bid with a 2–0 home win over Tottenham. Crystal Palace remain in the hunt for the title with a 2–1 home win over Sunderland. Leeds go fourth with a 4–1 home win over Chelsea. Sheffield United make it back-to-back victories by winning 1–0 at Luton. Manchester United beat Norwich City 3–0 at Old Trafford, ending Dave Stringer's team's run of five victories in their previous clashes between the two sides. West Ham go back to the top of the Second Division with a 2–0 home win over Oldham. Bristol City beat Portsmouth 4–1 to move to the brink of the playoff zone and boost their chances of a second successive promotion, while the bottom two of Hull and Oxford draw 3–3 at Boothferry Park.

29 December 1990 – Arsenal cut Liverpool's lead of the First Division to a single point by beating Sheffield United 4–1 at Highbury, although Kenny Dalglish's men still have two games in hand. Leeds go third with a 3–0 home win over Wimbledon. Coventry, Everton, QPR and Southampton all claim victories in their fight to avoid relegation. There is no shortage of excitement in the Second Division, including Oxford climbing five places off the bottom of the table with a 3–1 win over Blackburn at Ewood Park. Ipswich and Charlton draw 4–4 at Portman Road. Newcastle's frustrating season continues with a 2–0 home defeat to Notts County, which leaves them rooted in the bottom half of the table.

30 December 1990 – The last fixture of 1990 sees Liverpool lose 1–0 to Crystal Palace at Selhurst Park, which boosts Steve Coppell's side's hopes of winning their first ever major trophy in the shape of the league title.

31 December 1990 – The year ends with Arsenal, still unbeaten but having had two points deducted, one point behind of Liverpool at the top of the First Division. Crystal Palace and Leeds United occupy third and fourth respectively, while Sheffield United remain bottom of the table and Sunderland have slipped into the bottom two. West Ham United stand top of the Second Division, followed in second place by Oldham Athletic and in third place by Sheffield Wednesday. Middlesbrough, Notts County, Wolverhampton Wanderers and Bristol City occupy the playoff zone. Newcastle United, who began the season among the favourites for promotion, occupy a lowly 16th place and are just four points above the relegation zone that threatens them with Third Division football for the first time.

1 January 1991 – The new year begins with Paul Gascoigne being sent off in Tottenham's 2–1 defeat at home to Manchester United. Everton's resurgence under Howard Kendall continues with a 2–1 win at Chelsea. Sheffield United make it three wins from four games but remain bottom of the table with a 1–0 home win over QPR. The biggest drama in the Second Division comes at Fratton Park, where Portsmouth boost their survival hopes with a 5–1 home win over bottom club Hull City.

2 January 1991 – Nottingham Forest beat Norwich 6–2 at Carrow Road in the First Division.

5 January 1991 – The FA Cup third round produces a series of thrilling matches, perhaps the most notable being Second Division West Bromwich Albion's 4–2 home defeat to non-league Woking. GM Vauxhall Conference title hopefuls Barnet find themselves on the receiving end of a 5–0 defeat at home to Portsmouth. Chelsea suffer a shock 3–1 defeat at home to Second Division strugglers Oxford. Arsenal beat Sunderland 2–1 at Highbury, while Liverpool are held to a 1–1 draw at Blackburn.

6 January 1991 – Fourth Division Burnley attract more than 20,000 fans to Turf Moor, where they see Manchester City win the FA Cup third round tie 1–0. Barnsley, hopeful of following their Second Division rivals Leeds into the First Division for the first time, attract a crowd of more than 22,000 to Oakwell to watch a 1–1 draw. Last season's beaten finalists Crystal Palace draw 0–0 with Nottingham Forest.

7 January 1991 – Manchester United begin their defence of the FA Cup with a 2–1 home win over QPR.

8 January 1991 – Liverpool sign winger Jimmy Carter from Millwall for £800,000, on the same day that they beat Blackburn 3–0 in the FA Cup third round replay at Anfield to keep their hopes of a unique second double firmly on track. Brian Talbot is sacked as West Bromwich Albion manager following their shock FA Cup defeat.

9 January 1991 – In front of a smaller crowd than the one which saw them draw 1–1 at Oakwell three days ago, Leeds beat Barnsley 4–0 in the FA Cup third round replay at Elland Road. The other replays see Coventry beat Wigan 1–0 at Springfield Park and Wimbledon beat Aston Villa 1–0 at Plough Lane.

10 January 1991 – 34-year-old former England defender Viv Anderson joins Second Division promotion chasers Sheffield Wednesday on a free transfer from Manchester United.

12 January 1991 – Liverpool remain top of the table but drop two points when they are held to a goalless draw at Aston Villa. Arsenal miss the chance to go top when they are held to a goalless draw in the North London derby at White Hart Lane. Matthew Le Tissier and Rod Wallace score two goals each in Southampton's 4–3 win at Luton. Manchester United remain in the top five with a 3–0 home win over Sunderland.

13 January 1991 – Everton win 2–0 at Goodison Park in Howard Kendall's first match in charge against his old club Manchester City.

15 January 1991 – Liverpool sign 17-year-old midfielder Jamie Redknapp from AFC Bournemouth for £350,000.

16 January 1991 – Leeds United beat Aston Villa 4–1 in the FA Cup quarter final, while Southampton take Manchester United to a replay with a 1–1 draw, while the clash between Chelsea and Tottenham also goes to a replay after the first match at Stamford Bridge ends in a goalless draw. In the only league action of the day, Newcastle's woes continue when they lose 4–2 at Brighton in the Second Division, a result which lifts the South Coast club into the playoff zone.

17 January 1991 – Sheffield United pay a club record £450,000 for Crystal Palace midfielder Glyn Hodges, who played under Blades manager Dave Bassett several years ago when he was in charge at Wimbledon.

19 January 1991 – Arsenal go top of the First Division for the first time this season with a 1–0 home win over Everton, while Liverpool (who still have a game in hand) can only manage a 1–1 draw at home to Wimbledon. Crystal Palace's title hopes are hit by a 3–1 home defeat to Norwich.

23 January 1991 – Chelsea go through to the League semi-finals with a 3–0 win their quarter-final replay at Tottenham. Mark Hughes scores a hat-trick for Manchester United in their 3-2 replay win over Southampton at Old Trafford which takes them to this stage of the competition for the first time in eight seasons, while 20-year-old striker Alan Shearer scores twice for the losing side. Sheffield Wednesday win 1–0 at Coventry in their delayed quarter-final tie.

26 January 1991 – The first FA Cup fourth round ties are played. Second Division promotion rivals Millwall and Sheffield Wednesday clash in South London and battle out a dramatic 4–4 draw. A South Coast clash sees Portsmouth beat AFC Bournemouth 5–1 at Fratton Park. Manchester United beat Bolton Wanderers 1–0 at Old Trafford. The only First Division action of the day sees Sheffield United beat Derby 1–0 at Bramall Lane to boost their survival bid.

27 January 1991 – Woking's FA Cup dream comes to an end in the fourth round when they lose 1–0 to Everton at Goodison Park. Arsenal and Leeds draw 0–0 in their fourth round clash at Highbury.

28 January 1991 – Nottingham Forest beat Crystal Palace 3–0 in their second FA Cup third round replay at the City Ground.

29 January 1991 – David Pleat is sacked after three years as manager of Leicester City, the Second Division strugglers. His assistant Gordon Lee, the former Everton manager, is placed in temporary charge.

30 January 1991 – Liverpool sign striker David Speedie from Coventry City for £675,000.

31 January 1991 – Arsenal are one point ahead of Liverpool, who have a game in hand, at the top of the First Division. Meanwhile, Crystal Palace are still in contention for a first-ever league title, six points off the top, while Sheffield United remain bottom. West Ham United, Oldham Athletic and Sheffield Wednesday continue to occupy the top three places in the Second Division. Notts County, Middlesbrough, Brighton and Millwall occupy the playoff zone.

1 February 1991 – Paul Birch leaves Aston Villa after 10 years to join Wolverhampton Wanderers for £400,000.

2 February 1991 – Arsenal suffer their first league defeat of the season in their 24th game, going down 2–1 to Chelsea at Stamford Bridge. They remain top of the league by a single point, although Liverpool have two games in hand. Sheffield United are now just two points adrift of safety after a 4–1 home win over Southampton. In the Second Division, Oldham suffer a shock 5–1 defeat at Oxford.

12 February 1991 – Aston Villa sign defender Neil Cox from Scunthorpe United for £400,000, a record fee for a Fourth Division player.

17 February 1991 – Liverpool and Everton draw 0–0 in an all Merseyside FA Cup fifth round tie at Anfield.

20 February 1991 – Sheffield Wednesday sign 19-year-old striker Gordon Watson from Charlton Athletic for £250,000. The FA Cup fourth round replay between Liverpool ends in a dramatic 4–4 draw at Goodison Park, forcing a second replay.

21 February 1991 – In a record fee for a non-league player, Barnet striker Andy Clarke joins Wimbledon for £250,000.

22 February 1991 – Kenny Dalglish announces his resignation as Liverpool manager. Long-serving coach Ronnie Moran is appointed caretaker manager.

24 February 1991 – Arsenal return to the top of the First Division on goal difference, beating Crystal Palace 4–0 at Highbury, while Liverpool suffer a shock 3–1 defeat at Luton. Wimbledon go sixth with a 5–1 win over Tottenham at Plough Lane. In the first leg of the League Cup semi finals, Sheffield Wednesday win 2–0 at Chelsea and Manchester United win 1–0 at Leeds.

27 February 1991 – Everton beat Liverpool 1–0 in the second replay of the FA Cup fifth round tie at Goodison Park, ending Liverpool's hopes of a unique second double. Sheffield Wednesday reach their first cup final in 25 years by beating Chelsea 3–1 in the League Cup semi-final second leg.

28 February 1991 – February draws to a close with Arsenal now ahead of Liverpool at the top of the First Division on goal difference, while Crystal Palace are five points behind. At the other end of the table, a splendid run of form has moved Sheffield United six points clear of bottom-placed Derby County. The Blades are level on goal difference with Coventry City, Sunderland and Queens Park Rangers. West Ham United, Oldham Athletic and Sheffield Wednesday continue to lead the way in the Second Division. Middlesbrough, Notts County, Brighton and Millwall occupy the playoff zone, with Bristol City continuing to turn up the heat on them in their bid for a second successive promotion.

March – Liverpool captain Alan Hansen retires after 14 years at the club, having been out of action for almost a year due to injury.

2 March 1991 – Manchester United give Ryan Giggs his senior debut as a substitute in a league match at Old Trafford, which ends in a 2–0 defeat to Everton. Dean Saunders scores a hat-trick for Derby in a 3-3 relegation crunch clash with Sunderland at the Baseball Ground.

3 March 1991 – Arsenal move three points clear at the top of the First Division by beating Liverpool 1–0 at Anfield thanks to a goal by Paul Merson.

16 March 1991 – Liverpool go back to the top of the First Division by beating Sunderland 2–1 at Anfield.

17 March 1991 – Arsenal return to the top of the First Division on goal difference (with a game in hand) by beating Leeds 2–0 at Highbury.

20 March 1991 – Swindon Town sell defender Paul Bodin to Crystal Palace for £550,000.

22 March 1991 – Coventry City sign striker Robert Rosario from Norwich City for £600,000.

23 March 1991 – Liverpool beat Derby County 7–1 at the Baseball Ground, the first time in 28 years that a First Division team has scored seven goals away from home. Arsenal's goalless draw at Norwich sends Liverpool back to the top of the table.

26 March 1991 – Manchester United sign Soviet winger Andrei Kanchelskis, 22, from FC Shakhtar Donetsk for £1million. Ossie Ardiles leaves Swindon Town to become the new manager of Newcastle United following the resignation of Jim Smith.

27 March 1991 – In the only league game of the day, Oldham and West Ham remain locked together at the top of the Second Division after a 1–1 draw at Boundary Park.

28 March 1991 – The 90-day inquest into the Hillsborough disaster records a verdict of accidental death on the 95 Liverpool fans who died as a result of their injuries at the FA Cup semi-final on 15 April 1989.

30 March 1991 – Manchester United centre-back Steve Bruce scores twice in a 3–0 away league win over his old club Norwich City, becoming the first defender to score ten league goals this season. Arsenal return to the top of the First Division by beating Derby 2–0 at the Baseball Ground, while Liverpool suffer a shock 3–1 defeat at home to QPR.

31 March 1991 – March draws to a close with Arsenal leading Liverpool by two points. Sheffield United's incredible revival has continued as they now stand 12th in the table, but Derby County are twelve points adrift of safety, and Sunderland occupy the other relegation place. Oldham Athletic and West Ham United lead the Second Division level on 70 points, with Brighton, Middlesbrough, Millwall and Bristol City occupying the playoff zone. Ossie Ardiles becomes manager of Newcastle United, who are just six points outside the playoff zone with two games in hand.

1 April 1991 – Liverpool's hopes of retaining their league title are damaged by a 1–0 away defeat to Southampton.

3 April 1991 – Arsenal are five points ahead at the top of the First Division with seven games remaining after a 5–0 home win over Aston Villa.

6 April 1991 – Arsenal take a step closer to the title by beating Sheffield United 2–0 at Bramall Lane.

7 April 1991 – Crystal Palace win the Full Members Cup after a 4–1 victory over Everton in the Wembley final.

13 April 1991 – Liverpool's title challenge is kept alive with a thrilling 5–4 away win over Leeds United, but the Reds are five points behind Arsenal with five games left. Leeds striker Lee Chapman finds himself in the unusual position of scoring a hat-trick despite being on the losing side.

14 April 1991 – Tottenham Hotspur end Arsenal's hopes of the double and boost their own hopes of an eighth FA Cup triumph with a 3–1 win in the first FA Cup semi-final to be played at Wembley. Nottingham Forest win the other semi-final, crushing West Ham United 4–0 at Villa Park.

16 April 1991 – Graeme Souness is named as Liverpool's new manager, departing from Rangers, where he is succeeded by Walter Smith.

20 April 1991 – Nottingham Forest record the biggest First Division win of the season by beating Chelsea 7–0 at the City Ground. Derby County lose to Manchester City and are relegated. West Ham seal promotion back to the First Division two years after relegation by beating Swindon 2–0 at Upton Park, with five games left to play in the Second Division.

21 April 1991 – Sheffield Wednesday, chasing promotion to the First Division, achieve a 1–0 win over Manchester United in the League Cup final to end a 56-year trophy drought.

23 April 1991 – David White scores four goals for Manchester City in a 5–2 away win over Aston Villa. With three games to go, the title race remains open as both Arsenal and Liverpool win and the gap remains three points wide.

27 April 1919 – Oldham Athletic are promoted to the First Division after 68-year exile by beating Ipswich Town 2-1 a to Portman Road.

30 April 1991 – April draws to a close with Arsenal three points ahead of Liverpool with three matches left, while Crystal Palace's title dreams have ended. Sunderland, Luton Town and last season's runners-up Aston Villa still fighting to avoid relegation alongside Derby County.

1 May 1991 – England beat Turkey 1–0 in İzmir in their fourth European Championship qualifying game.

4 May 1991 – Arsenal edge closer to the title by drawing 0–0 with Sunderland, while Liverpool are beaten 4–2 by Chelsea.

6 May 1991 – Liverpool are beaten 2–1 by Nottingham Forest, handing the title to Arsenal, who beat Manchester United 3–1. Alan Smith scores a hat-trick.

8 May 1991 – Aston Villa, First Division runners-up last season, confirm their survival with a 2–1 win at home to Norwich City. Sheffield Wednesday seal an immediate return to the First Division with a 3–1 home win over Bristol City.

11 May 1991 – Sunderland are relegated to the Second Division as they lose to Manchester City and Luton Town beat Derby County 2–0. It is the second season running that Luton have survived on the last day of the season with victory over Derby. Arsenal end their championship campaign with a 6–1 demolition of Coventry City at Highbury, with Anders Limpar scoring a hat-trick. The Second Division campaign ended with Oldham Athletic, already promoted to the First Division for the first time since 1923, crowned as champions thanks to an injury-time final-day Neil Redfearn penalty earning them a 3–2 comeback victory over Sheffield Wednesday. West Ham United, last day losers to 4th-place Notts County, had to settle for second. Sheffield Wednesday took the third automatic promotion spot. Hull City's relegation was confirmed 2 weeks ago, while West Bromwich Albion are relegated alongside them to fall into the Third Division for the first time in their history.

13 May 1991 – Gerry Francis resigns after four years as manager of Bristol Rovers, despite having guided the club a mid table finish in the Second Division a year after winning promotion.

15 May 1991 – Manchester United mark the return to European football by English clubs with a 2–1 win over Barcelona in the European Cup Winners' Cup final in Rotterdam. Mark Hughes scores both goals.

18 May 1991 – Tottenham Hotspur win the FA Cup for the eighth time, beating Nottingham Forest 2–1 after extra time in the final. Paul Gascoigne suffers cruciate knee ligament damage, causing his proposed £8.5million move to Lazio to be put on hold.

20 May 1991 – The First Division campaign ends with a 1–1 draw between Manchester United and Tottenham at Old Trafford.

21 May 1991 – QPR manager Don Howe is sacked after 18 months in charge at Loftus Road.

28 May 1991 – Jozef Vengloš leaves Aston Villa after just one season as manager.

30 May 1991 – Brian Little, whose Darlington side have just secured their second successive promotion and won the Fourth Division title, is appointed as Leicester City's new manager.

31 May 1991 – Ron Atkinson, the Sheffield Wednesday manager, turns down an offer to become the new Aston Villa manager. Torquay United win promotion to the Third Division after nearly 20 years in the Fourth Division, beating Blackpool on penalties after a 2–2 draw in the Wembley playoff final.

1 June 1991 – Gerry Francis, who was captain of QPR during the 1970s, returns to Loftus Road as manager. Jim Smith is appointed manager of Portsmouth. Tranmere reach the Second Division for the first time since 1938 by beating Bolton 1–0 in the Third Division playoff final.

2 June 1991 – Notts County beat Brighton & Hove Albion 3–1 in the Second Division play-off final to seal promotion to the First Division – their second successive promotion.

6 June 1991 – David Pleat is appointed Luton Town manager for the second time. Leeds United pay a club record £1.6million for Southampton striker Rod Wallace.

7 June 1991 – Ron Atkinson becomes the new Aston Villa manager after accepting an improved offer.

18 June 1991 – Veteran striker Trevor Francis is appointed player-manager of Sheffield Wednesday.

25 June 1991 – Blackburn Rovers, now bankrolled by the wealth of local steel baron Jack Walker, pay a club record £700,000 for Barnsley midfielder Steve Agnew.

27 June 1991 – Former Oldham Athletic goalkeeper Andy Goram becomes Scotland's first £1million goalkeeper after a move from Hibernian to Glasgow Rangers.

== FA Cup ==
Tottenham Hotspur beat Nottingham Forest 2–1 after extra time in the FA Cup final. The decisive goal was an own goal by Forest defender Des Walker. Tottenham's triumph was overshadowed by a knee injury to star midfielder Paul Gascoigne in the opening 15 minutes.

== Football League Cup ==
Sheffield Wednesday earned a shock 1–0 victory over their manager Ron Atkinson's old club Manchester United in the final thanks to a goal from John Sheridan.

== Football League ==
=== First Division ===
Arsenal won the First Division after losing just one of their league matches and conceding just 18 goals all season. Liverpool finished runners-up; they had led for much of the season, but the shock resignation of manager Kenny Dalglish with the club top of the table in February resulted in their form completely collapsing, with a revival following the return of former player Graeme Souness as manager not being enough to catch Arsenal. Third place went to Crystal Palace, who recorded their highest-ever league finish. Newly promoted Leeds United had a good season back in the First Division as they finished fourth, and also reached the semi-finals of the League Cup.

At the bottom of the table, Derby County went down in last place with just five wins all season despite the 17 league goals of Welsh striker Dean Saunders, who was then sold to Liverpool. The other relegation place went to Sunderland.

Pos	Team	Pld	W	D	L	GF	GA	GD	Pts	Qualification or relegation
1	Arsenal (C)	38	24	13	1	74	18	+56	83 (Note: Arsenal deducted two points; Manchester United deducted one point due to a brawl in a game between both teams.)	Qualification for the European Cup first round
2	Liverpool	38	23	7	8	77	40	+37	76	Qualification for the UEFA Cup first round
3	Crystal Palace	38	20	9	9	50	41	+9	69	
4	Leeds United	38	19	7	12	65	47	+18	64	
5	Manchester City	38	17	11	10	64	53	+11	62	
6	Manchester United	38	16	12	10	58	45	+13	59	Qualification for the Cup Winners' Cup first round
7	Wimbledon	38	14	14	10	53	46	+7	56	
8	Nottingham Forest	38	14	12	12	65	50	+15	54	
9	Everton	38	13	12	13	50	46	+4	51	
10	Tottenham Hotspur	38	11	16	11	51	50	+1	49	Qualification for the Cup Winners' Cup qualifying round
11	Chelsea	38	13	10	15	58	69	−11	49	
12	Queens Park Rangers	38	12	10	16	44	53	−9	46	
13	Sheffield United	38	13	7	18	36	55	−19	46	
14	Southampton	38	12	9	17	58	69	−11	45	
15	Norwich City	38	13	6	19	41	64	−23	45	
16	Coventry City	38	11	11	16	42	49	−7	44	
17	Aston Villa	38	9	14	15	46	58	−12	41	
18	Luton Town	38	10	7	21	42	61	−19	37	
19	Sunderland (R)	38	8	10	20	38	60	−22	34	Relegation to the Second Division
20	Derby County (R)	38	5	9	24	37	75	−38	24	Relegation to the Second Division

Source: World Football
Rules for classification: 1) Points; 2) Goal difference; 3) Goals scored
(C) Champions; (R) Relegated

=== Second Division ===
Joe Royle's Oldham Athletic side won the Second Division championship ahead of West Ham United, who were promoted as runners-up. Joining them in promotion were League Cup winners Sheffield Wednesday, who finished in third place. Neil Warnock guided Notts County to a second successive victory in the promotion play-offs. Hull City and West Bromwich Albion were relegated.

Pos	Team	Pld	W	D	L	GF	GA	GD	Pts	Qualification or relegation
1	Oldham Athletic (C, P)	46	25	13	8	83	53	+30	88	Promotion to the First Division
2	West Ham United (P)	46	24	15	7	60	34	+26	87	Promotion to the First Division
3	Sheffield Wednesday (P)	46	22	16	8	80	51	+29	82	Promotion to the First Division
4	Notts County (O, P)	46	23	11	12	76	55	+21	80	Qualification for the Second Division play-offs
5	Millwall	46	20	13	13	70	51	+19	73	Qualification for the Second Division play-offs
6	Brighton & Hove Albion	46	21	7	18	63	69	−6	70	Qualification for the Second Division play-offs
7	Middlesbrough	46	20	9	17	66	47	+19	69	Qualification for the Second Division play-offs
8	Barnsley	46	19	12	15	63	48	+15	69	
9	Bristol City	46	20	7	19	68	71	−3	67	
10	Oxford United	46	14	19	13	69	66	+3	61	
11	Newcastle United	46	14	17	15	49	56	−7	59	
12	Wolverhampton Wanderers	46	13	19	14	63	63	0	58	
13	Bristol Rovers	46	15	13	18	56	59	−3	58	
14	Ipswich Town	46	13	18	15	60	68	−8	57	
15	Port Vale	46	15	12	19	56	64	−8	57	
16	Charlton Athletic	46	13	17	16	57	61	−4	56	
17	Portsmouth	46	14	11	21	58	70	−12	53	
18	Plymouth Argyle	46	12	17	17	54	68	−14	53	
19	Blackburn Rovers	46	14	10	22	51	66	−15	52	
20	Watford	46	12	15	19	45	59	−14	51	
21	Swindon Town	46	12	14	20	65	73	−8	50	
22	Leicester City	46	14	8	24	60	83	−23	50	
23	West Bromwich Albion (R)	46	10	18	18	52	61	−9	48	Relegation to the Third Division
24	Hull City (R)	46	10	15	21	57	85	−28	45	Relegation to the Third Division

Rules for classification: 1) Points; 2) Goal difference; 3) Goals scored
(C) Champions; (O) Play-off winners; (P) Promoted; (R) Relegated

==== Second Division play-offs ====
Semifinals; 1st leg – 19 May; 2nd leg – 22 May 1991
4th	Notts County	1	1	2
7th	Middlesbrough	1	0	1
5th	Millwall	1	1	2
6th	Brighton & Hove Albion	4	2	6

Final at Wembley; 2 June 1991
4th	Notts County	3
6th	Brighton & Hove Albion	1

=== Third Division ===
Champions Cambridge United, runners-up Southend United and third-placed Grimsby Town occupied the automatic promotion places and all achieved second successive promotions. The fourth promotion place went to play-off winners Tranmere Rovers. Going down to the Fourth Division were Crewe Alexandra, Rotherham United and Mansfield Town.

Pos	Team	Pld	W	D	L	GF	GA	GD	Pts	Promotion or relegation
1	Cambridge United (C, P)	46	25	11	10	75	45	+30	86	Promotion to the Second Division
2	Southend United (P)	46	26	7	13	67	51	+16	85	Promotion to the Second Division
3	Grimsby Town (P)	46	24	11	11	66	34	+32	83	Promotion to the Second Division
4	Bolton Wanderers	46	24	11	11	64	50	+14	83	Qualification for the Third Division play-offs
5	Tranmere Rovers (O, P)	46	23	9	14	64	46	+18	78	Qualification for the Third Division play-offs
6	Brentford	46	21	13	12	59	47	+12	76	Qualification for the Third Division play-offs
7	Bury	46	20	13	13	67	56	+11	73	Qualification for the Third Division play-offs
8	Bradford City	46	20	10	16	62	54	+8	70	
9	Bournemouth	46	19	13	14	58	58	0	70	
10	Wigan Athletic	46	20	9	17	71	54	+17	69	
11	Huddersfield Town	46	18	13	15	57	51	+6	67	
12	Birmingham City	46	16	17	13	45	49	−4	65	
13	Leyton Orient	46	18	10	18	55	58	−3	64	
14	Stoke City	46	16	12	18	55	59	−4	60	
15	Reading	46	17	8	21	53	66	−13	59	
16	Exeter City	46	16	9	21	58	52	+6	57	
17	Preston North End	46	15	11	20	54	67	−13	56	
18	Shrewsbury Town	46	14	10	22	61	68	−7	52	
19	Chester City	46	14	9	23	46	58	−12	51	
20	Swansea City	46	13	9	24	49	72	−23	48	Qualification for the Cup Winners' Cup first round
21	Fulham	46	10	16	20	41	56	−15	46	
22	Crewe Alexandra (R)	46	11	11	24	62	80	−18	44	Relegation to the Fourth Division
23	Rotherham United (R)	46	10	12	24	50	87	−37	42	Relegation to the Fourth Division
24	Mansfield Town (R)	46	8	14	24	42	63	−21	38	Relegation to the Fourth Division

(C) Champions; (O) Play-off winners; (P) Promoted; (R) Relegated

==== Third Division play-offs ====
The semifinals were decided over two legs, and only the aggregates are given in the schemata below. The final consisted of only a single match.
The full results can be found at: Football League Division Three play-offs 1991.

Semifinals; 1st leg – 19 May; 2nd leg – 22 May 1991
4th	Bolton Wanderers	1	1	2
7th	Bury	1	0	1
5th	Tranmere Rovers	2	1	3
6th	Brentford	2	0	2

Final at Wembley; 1 June 1991
4th	Bolton Wanderers	0
5th	Tranmere Rovers (a.e.t.)	1

=== Fourth Division ===
Brian Little's Darlington won the Fourth Division championship to earn a second successive promotion, while the other four promotion places went to Stockport County, Hartlepool United, Peterborough United and Torquay United. Torquay were the play-off winners, beating Blackpool in a penalty shoot-out in the final.

Wrexham finished bottom of the league, but avoided relegation into the Conference as the Football League increased in size from 92 to 93 teams for 1991–92.

Pos	Team	Pld	W	D	L	GF	GA	GD	Pts	Promotion
1	Darlington (C, P)	46	22	17	7	68	38	+30	83	Promotion to the Third Division
2	Stockport County (P)	46	23	13	10	84	47	+37	82	Promotion to the Third Division
3	Hartlepool United (P)	46	24	10	12	67	48	+19	82	Promotion to the Third Division
4	Peterborough United (P)	46	21	17	8	67	45	+22	80	Promotion to the Third Division
5	Blackpool	46	23	10	13	78	47	+31	79	Qualification for the Fourth Division play-offs
6	Burnley	46	23	10	13	70	51	+19	79	Qualification for the Fourth Division play-offs
7	Torquay United (O, P)	46	18	18	10	64	47	+17	72	Qualification for the Fourth Division play-offs
8	Scunthorpe United	46	20	11	15	71	62	+9	71	Qualification for the Fourth Division play-offs
9	Scarborough	46	19	12	15	59	56	+3	69	
10	Northampton Town	46	18	13	15	57	58	−1	67	
11	Doncaster Rovers	46	17	14	15	56	46	+10	65	
12	Rochdale	46	15	17	14	50	53	−3	62	
13	Cardiff City	46	15	15	16	43	54	−11	60	
14	Lincoln City	46	14	17	15	50	61	−11	59	
15	Gillingham	46	12	18	16	57	60	−3	54	
16	Walsall	46	12	17	17	48	51	−3	53	
17	Hereford United	46	13	14	19	53	58	−5	53	
18	Chesterfield	46	13	14	19	47	62	−15	53	
19	Maidstone United	46	13	12	21	66	71	−5	51	
20	Carlisle United	46	13	9	24	47	89	−42	48	
21	York City	46	11	13	22	45	57	−12	46	
22	Halifax Town	46	12	10	24	59	79	−20	46	
23	Aldershot	46	10	11	25	61	101	−40	41	
24	Wrexham	46	10	10	26	48	74	−26	40	

(C) Champions; (O) Play-off winners; (P) Promoted

==== Fourth Division play-offs ====
Semifinals; 1st leg – 19 May; 2nd leg – 22 May 1991
5th	Blackpool	1	2	3
8th	Scunthorpe United	1	1	2
6th	Burnley	0	1	1
7th	Torquay United	2	0	2

Final at Wembley; 31 May 1991
5th	Blackpool	2 (4)
7th	Torquay United (pen.)	2 (5)

=== Top goalscorers ===
First Division

- Alan Smith (Arsenal) – 22 goals

Second Division

- Teddy Sheringham (Millwall) – 38 goals

Third Division

- Brett Angell (Southend United)/Tony Philliskirk (Bolton Wanderers) – 26 goals

Fourth Division

- Steve Norris (Halifax Town) – 35 goals

== Non-league football ==
The divisional champions of the major non-League competitions were:

Competition	Winners
Football Conference	Barnet
Isthmian League	Redbridge Forest
Northern Premier League	Witton Albion
Southern League	Farnborough Town
FA Trophy	Wycombe Wanderers
FA Vase	Guiseley

== Famous debutants ==
- 1 September 1990: Jason Cundy, 20-year-old centre-back, makes his debut for Chelsea in a 1–0 defeat to Queens Park Rangers at Loftus Road.
- 15 December 1990: Steve McManaman, 18-year-old winger, makes his debut as a substitute for Liverpool in a 2–0 win at home to Sheffield United at Anfield.
- 29 December 1990: Andy Cole, 19-year-old striker, makes his debut as a substitute for Arsenal in a 4–1 win at home to Sheffield United at Highbury.
- 2 March 1991: Ryan Giggs, 17-year-old winger, makes his debut as a substitute for Manchester United in a 2–0 defeat at home to Everton at Old Trafford.
- 10 April 1991: Ian Walker, 19-year-old goalkeeper, makes his debut for Tottenham Hotspur in a 2–1 defeat to Norwich City at Carrow Road.
- 23 April 1991: Gareth Southgate, 20-year-old centre-back, makes his league debut for Crystal Palace in a 3–0 defeat to Liverpool at Anfield.
- 4 May 1991: Chris Sutton, 18-year-old striker, makes his debut as a substitute for Norwich City in a 1–0 win at home to Queens Park Rangers at Carrow Road.

== Retirements ==
- Tommy Hutchison, 43-year-old midfielder with one of the highest appearance records of any player in English football, played his final game for Swansea City on 12 March 1991 against Southend United in the Third Division.
- Jim Beglin, 27-year-old Leeds United and Republic of Ireland left-back formerly with Liverpool, retires after failing to overcome a long-term knee injury.
- Alan Hansen, 35-year-old Liverpool captain and former Scotland international, retires after a year out of action with injury.
- Norman Whiteside, 26-year-old Everton and Northern Ireland attacking midfielder, formerly of Manchester United, retires due to a knee injury.

== Deaths ==
July 1990 – Eric Anderson, 59, played for Liverpool and Barnsley as a forward during the 1950s.

23 July 1990 – Dave Deacon, 61, played 66 league games for Ipswich Town, many of them under the management of Alf Ramsey, and later played for Cambridge United when they were still a non-league team.

9 August 1990 – Joe Mercer, 76, who won a total of three league titles as a player with Everton (1939) and Arsenal (1948 and 1953), and was later manager of Sheffield United, Aston Villa, Manchester City and Coventry City, as well as an interim spell as manager of the England national football team in 1974.

15 August 1990 – Billy Hume, 54, spent most of his career in his native Scotland but made 10 appearances as a forward for Birmingham City between 1958 and 1960.

17 August 1990 – Ian Handysides, 27, former Birmingham City, Walsall and Wolves forward, died of cancer after a two-year battle against the illness.

20 August 1990 -

  - – Fred Bennett, 83, played a total of 287 league games at full-back during the interwar years for Bristol Rovers and Chester.
  - – Bill Curry, 54, played 391 games as a forward between 1953 and 1969 for Newcastle United, Brighton, Derby County, Mansfield Town and Chesterfield.

8 September 1990 – David Longhurst, 25, York City striker, died after collapsing during a Fourth Division fixture at home to Lincoln City.

5 October 1990 – Peter Taylor, 62, most famous for serving as assistant manager to Brian Clough at Hartlepool United, Derby County, Brighton and Nottingham Forest between 1965 and 1982. Also had a spell as manager of non-league Burton Albion before linking up with Clough, and later returned to Derby as manager from 1982 to 1984.

28 November 1990 – Ted Catlin, 79, played more than 200 games at left-back for Sheffield Wednesday during the 1930s and picked up an FA Cup winner's medal in 1935, also winning five caps for England.

December 1990 – Pat Jones, 70, played 425 league games for Plymouth Argyle as a full-back between 1946 and 1957.

22 December 1990 – Robin Friday, 38, who was found dead from heart attack in his London flat, was a striker for Reading and Cardiff City during the 1970s.

24 December 1990 – Don Dearson, 76, played 131 league games for Birmingham City during a career which was disrupted by the Second World War, before spending the final few seasons of his career with Coventry City and Walsall.

25 January 1991 – Frank Soo, 76, played 173 league games at half-back for Stoke City before the Second World War and 71 times for Luton Town in the early postwar league campaigns. He later managed 12 different British and overseas club sides and had a brief spell in charge of the Norway national football team.

April 1991 – Bobby Baxter, 80, played 247 league games for Middlesbrough during the 1930s before completing his league career in his native Scotland with Hearts in the immediate postwar era.

May 1991 – Harold Hobbis, 78, made 248 league appearances for Charlton Athletic as a winger between 1931 and 1948, and scored one goal in two pre-war appearances for the England team.

22 May 1991 – Stan Mortensen, 69, former Blackpool forward who scored over 200 goals for the club all competitions, winning the FA Cup in 1953 and also scoring 23 goals in 25 games for the England team.
