= CNE Cup of Champions =

Celtic 3–0 A.C. Milan
- Event: CNE Cup of Champions
Celtic	A.C. Milan
(Scotland)	(Italy)
2	0
- Date: 3 June 1968
- Venue: Canadian National Exhibition Stadium, Toronto
- Referee: G. Deinst
- Attendance: 31,121

The CNE Cup of Champions was a one-off match played in June 1968 between Celtic and Milan. The match was played in Toronto, Ontario, Canada, to try to boost the popularity of football in the country.

== Match summary ==
The match was played on 1 June 1968, in the Canadian National Exhibition Stadium with a crowd of 31,121 (a record for a football match in Canada at the time), although 20,000 were thought to be Celtic fans who had travelled from across North America.

Even though Celtic were without the injured Tommy Gemmell and the aviophobic Jimmy Johnstone, Celtic were able to adapt to the situation and both teams tried very hard to win the game from the first minute on and the game swung from end to end in a frantic first 45 minutes. Despite no goals being scored in the first half, Celtic scored a goal in the 49th minute. The first goal was scored after a ball was swung into the box and Bobby Lennox slotted past the keeper before he could react. The second goal was even more spectacular after the Celtic keeper threw the ball to winger John Hughes, the burly winger then started a rampaging run 60 yards across the field shoving aside the Italian defenders before passing the ball into the box for Charlie Gallagher who scored the goal that finished the game off.
