= National Five-a-Sides (England) =

- Founded: 1968
- Abolished: 1986
- Region: England (The FA)
- Teams: 16 (1972–82)
- Last champions: Norwich City (1st title)
- Most championships: Wolverhampton Wanderers, Southampton (2 titles)
- Broadcaster: BBC (1972–83)

The Daily Express National Five-a-Sides was an annual indoor football tournament for Football League clubs across England, with Scottish League clubs invited on occasions. The competition was contested between 1968 and 1986 (and televised up to 1983).

== History ==
The Daily Express sponsored competition was held at Wembley Arena to packed crowds of between 8,000 and 10,000. The competition was a covered by the BBC and highlighted on their Wednesday Sportsnight programme. The last televised edition was in 1983.

There was no coverage of the 1985 edition because of the TV blackout on football in England at the time.

Scottish football teams received invites. Other indoor tournaments popular around this time included Evening Standard London Five-a-Sides (around since 1954) and Guinness Soccer Six (inspired by MISL) competitions. Both the national and London fives tournaments shared a home at the Wembley Arena between 1968 and 1986.

Matches were split in two four minute halves. Time limits for matches increased as the tournament progressed. Though match lengths altered over the years. Any drawn matches were resolved with a penalty shoot-out. The rules included no passbacks to the goalkeeper and the ball must remain below shoulder height.

== Competing teams ==
- 1974–75: Ipswich Town, Luton Town (East); Chelsea, Leyton Orient, QPR, Tottenham (London) Derby County, Leicester City, Stoke City, Wolves (Midlands); Middlesbrough (North East); Everton, Man City, Man United (North West); Celtic, Rangers (Scotland)
- 1975–76: Leyton Orient, Tottenham (London); Derby County (Midlands) Man City, Man United (North West)
- 1977–78: Ipswich Town (East), Arsenal, Chelsea, QPR, Tottenham, West Ham (London); Aston Villa, Coventry City, Derby County, Notts Forest, Wolves (Midlands); Newcastle United (North East); Everton, Man City, Man United (North West); Celtic (Scotland)
- 1978–79: Ipswich Town (East); Derby County, Wolves (Midlands); Man City, Man United (North West), Southampton (South East)
- 1980–81: Ipswich Town (East); Arsenal, Crystal Palace, Chelsea, QPR, Tottenham (London); Aston Villa, Coventry, Notts Forest, WBA (Midlands); Newcastle United, Sunderland (North East); Man City, Man United (North West); Brighton (South East); Aberdeen (Scotland)
- 1981–82: Ipswich Town (East); Arsenal, Chelsea, Crystal Palace, QPR, Watford, West Ham (London); Birmingham City, Coventry City, WBA (Midlands); Everton, Man United (North West); Southampton (South East); Celtic, Rangers (Scotland), Swansea City (Wales)
- 1982–83: Ipswich Town, Luton Town (East); Arsenal, QPR, Watford, West Ham (London); Aston Villa, Birmingham City, Coventry City, Notts Forest (Midlands), Sunderland, Newcastle United (North East), Man City, Man United (North West), Southampton (South East); Celtic (Scotland)
- 1986–87: Luton Town, Norwich City (East); Arsenal, Charlton, Tottenham, Watford, West Ham (London); Aston Villa, Coventry City, Notts Forest (Midlands); Man City, Man United (North West); Oxford United, Reading, Southampton (South East); Sheffield United (Yorkshire)

== List of Finals ==
Season	Winners	Score	Runners up	Final scorers (Note: Scorers from the winning team are listed first. The scorers from penalty shoot-outs were not included.)	Ref
1967–68	Charlton Athletic	1–0	Gillingham	Peacock	
1968–69	No competition. Tournament moved from May to November.				
1969–70	Manchester City	2–1	Swindon Town	Bell, Young; Rodgers	
1970–71	Manchester United	2–1	Tottenham Hotspur	Best (2); Knowles	
1971–72	Southampton	0–0 (1–0 p)	Leicester City		
1972–73	Tottenham Hotspur	2– 2 (4–3 p)	Ipswich Town	Holder (2), Pratt, Pearce; Hamilton (2), Viljoen	
1973–74	Derby County	3–1	Celtic		
1974–75	Leyton Orient	2–0	Tottenham Hotspur	Hoadley (2)	
1975–76	Wolverhampton Wanderers	3–1	Tottenham Hotspur	Bailey, Hibbitt, Carr; McNab	
1976–77	Wolverhampton Wanderers	2–1	Stoke City	Daley, Hibbitt; Lumsdon	
1977–78	Ipswich Town	3–1	Coventry City	; Oakey	
1978–79	Crystal Palace	2–2; Penalties	Chelsea		
1979–80	Sunderland	2–0	Brighton & Hove Albion	Arnott, Buckley	
1980–81	Aston Villa	3–0	Chelsea	Evans, Swain, Bremner	
1981–82	Celtic	1–0	Southampton	Nicholas	
1982–83	Arsenal	2–0	Aston Villa	McDermott, Talbot	
1983–84	Southampton	3–0	Aston Villa	Wallace, Moran, Holmes	
1984–85	Watford	1–0	Aston Villa	Sterling	
1985–86	Oxford United	2–2 (1–0 p)	Arsenal	; Sansom (2)	
1986–87	Norwich City	5–0	Manchester City	Putney (2), Culverhouse (2), Gordon	

== Finalists by ==
=== League ===
League	Winners	Runners up
Football League First Division	13	14
Football League Second Division	5	2
Football League Third Division	0	1
Scottish Premier Division	1	1

=== Country ===
Country	Winners	Runners up
England	18	17
Scotland	1	1

== See also ==
- Tennents' Sixes
