= Jimmy McGrory =

Scottish footballer (1904–1982)

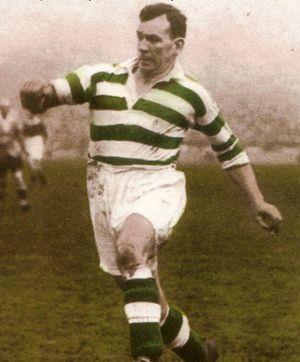
- McGrory with Celtic

Personal information
- Full name: James Edward McGrory
- Date of birth: 26 April 1904
- Place of birth: Garngad, Glasgow, Scotland
- Date of death: 20 October 1982 (aged 78)
- Place of death: Glasgow, Scotland
- Height: 5 ft 6 in (1.68 m)
- Position: Centre forward

Youth career
- 1918–1921: St Roch's Boys Guild

Senior career*
Years	Team	Apps	(Gls)
1921–1922	St Roch's		
1922–1937	Celtic	378	(395)
1923–1924	→ Clydebank (loan)	30	(13)
Total		408	(408)

International career
1928–1933	Scotland	7	(6)
1926–1935	Scottish League XI	6	(6)

Managerial career
- 1937–1945: Kilmarnock
- 1945–1965: Celtic
- * Club domestic league appearances and goals

James Edward McGrory (26 April 1904 – 20 October 1982) was a Scottish footballer who played for Celtic, Clydebank and Scotland as a forward. He later managed Kilmarnock and Celtic.

McGrory is the all-time leading goalscorer in top-flight British football, with a total of 550 goals in 547 competitive first-team games at club and international level.

A legendary figure within Celtic's history, he played for the club for 15 years between 1922 and 1937 (aside from the majority of the 1923–24 season which was spent on loan at fellow Division One side Clydebank), and is Celtic's top scorer of all time with 522 goals from 501 games and holds their record for the most goals in a season, with 62 goals from 46 games in the 1927–28 season. He has also notched up a British top-flight record of 55 hat-tricks, 48 coming in Scottish Football League games and seven from Scottish Cup ties. Some argue that he scored 56, as he hit eight goals in a Scottish League game against Dunfermline Athletic on 14 January 1928, a British top-flight record.

After a spell managing Kilmarnock from December 1937 to July 1945, he became Celtic manager, where he remained for just under 20 years, until March 1965 when he was succeeded by Jock Stein.

Although only 5 ft 6 in (1.68 m) tall, McGrory was renowned for his prowess and ability for headers. His trademark was an almost horizontal bullet header, which he used regularly in scoring, and which earned him the nicknames "the Human Torpedo" and "the Mermaid".

== Early life ==
McGrory was born at Millburn Street in the Garngad neighbourhood of Glasgow. He was the son of Henry McGrory and Catherine Coll, both of whom were Irish Catholic immigrants from Ulster. Henry and Catherine had been married at Saint Baithin's Church (known locally as 'the Chapel') in St Johnston, a village in The Laggan district in the east of County Donegal, before emigrating to Scotland. Catherine was from the townland of Cavanacaw and Henry was from the townland of Tullyowen, both in St Johnston, where Jimmy's elder brother was born before the family left Ireland. They lived in Glasgow's East End on his father's wages as a gasworks labourer.

== Playing career ==
=== St Roch's ===
McGrory began playing for St Roch's Juniors aged 16, earning £2 a week. In his first season of 1921–22, he helped the side win a Double. St Roch's won the Scottish Junior Football League and the Scottish Junior Cup, where he scored the equaliser in a 2–1 win over Kilwinning Rangers. In 2013, St Roch's renamed their ground in honour of McGrory, changing it from Provanmill Park to The James McGrory Park.

=== Celtic ===
==== 1920s ====
With many clubs now scouting McGrory, such as Third Lanark and Fulham, Celtic jumped in first and approached to sign him. He signed his first full professional contract for Celtic on 10 June 1922, for £5 a week, in the pavilion at Third Lanark's Cathkin Park. He made his debut on 20 January 1923, in a 1–0 away defeat, also at Cathkin Park. His first goal came two weeks later on 3 February 1923, in a 4–3 League defeat against Kilmarnock at Rugby Park. In total, he made three League and one Scottish Cup appearances, scoring that one goal at Rugby Park.

He was loaned out to Clydebank on 7 August 1923 and later that month scored on his debut against Aberdeen at Pittodrie in a 3–1 defeat. On 1 March 1924, he lined up in the Clydebank side to face Celtic at Parkhead. It ended up being quite a bizarre day for him, as he ended up scoring the winner in a shock 2–1 victory for Clydebank. Not long after this, and before the season was out, he was recalled to Celtic. In his time at Clydebank he played 33 League and Scottish Cup games, scoring 16 goals. Having returned to Celtic, he featured in the Glasgow Charity Cup semi-final against Queens Park on 6 May 1924, scoring in a 2–0 win. The final was two days later on 8 May 1924, where he played at outside-left in a 2–1 win over Rangers.

The 1924–25 season started poorly, with McGrory not scoring in his first three games, but worse was to come when his father was killed after accidentally being struck by a stone in a local park. McGrory played against Falkirk the following Saturday, just hours after having attended his father's funeral, and yet managed to get off the mark for the season with his first goal in a 2–1 win. With his goalscoring touch returned, he continued to add to his tally until a knee injury in November 1924 ruled him out until into the following year. McGrory returned in stunning form in the 1924–25 Scottish Cup, scoring a hat-trick against Third Lanark and a double against Rangers in a 5–0 semi-final victory. He then headed a last minute winning goal in the 2–1 Scottish Cup Final victory over Dundee on 11 April 1925, the first major honour of his career. He finished his first full season at Celtic with 30 goals.

The 1925–26 season was a successful one both personally and collectively, with Celtic winning the 1925–26 Scottish Division One championship and McGrory finishing the season with 49 goals in all competitions, including a streak of scoring in seven consecutive league games. Celtic reached their second successive Scottish Cup Final, but McGrory this time was on the losing side as they lost 2–0 to St Mirren.

While Celtic relinquished the Scottish League title in 1926–27, finishing in third place, McGrory had his best goalscoring season. He started well, twice scoring four goals and twice scoring five, and by New Year had 34 League goals, only one fewer than the previous season's final tally of 35. He was just as prolific in the 1926–27 Scottish Cup, where he scored nine goals in only six outings, although he missed out on playing in the final, which Celtic won 3–1 against East Fife, due to breaking two ribs in an April league defeat to Falkirk. Despite missing the final, he still received a winner's medal on manager Willie Maley's recommendation due to the goals he had scored during their cup run. His 48 league goals throughout the season, including seven hat-tricks, saw him finish the top scorer in the Scottish top flight for the first time. He also scored a further hat trick in the Scottish Cup, in a 6–3 win away at Brechin City, to make a total of 8 hat-tricks for the season. A further two goals in the Glasgow Cup brought McGrory's total for the season to 59 goals.

By the late 1920s McGrory was a wanted man; in five seasons he had scored 143 League and Scottish Cup goals in just 152 games, and Celtic had already received and turned down countless offers for him. However, in August 1927 they decided to accept an offer from Arsenal for £10,000, which would have set a new world football transfer record. McGrory accepted a paid holiday invitation from Celtic to make a pilgrimage to the shrine at Lourdes, as a guest of Celtic manager Willie Maley; however, Maley had arranged a meeting with Arsenal manager Herbert Chapman and chairman Sir Samuel Hill-Wood MP in London, which surprised McGrory when he and Maley arrived at Euston railway station. Chapman tried his hardest to persuade McGrory to sign for Arsenal, but he turned him down flatly. Upon their return from Lourdes, McGrory and Maley were again met in London by Chapman and Hill-Wood (this time also surprising Maley) and made one last attempt at getting McGrory's signature, but again failed to persuade him. In the aftermath of his refusal to leave Celtic, McGrory's weekly wage was reduced from £9 to £8 from the beginning of the season, with no warning or reason given. It is generally assumed that this was done out of spite for his refusal to sign for Arsenal and the club's loss of a £10,000 windfall. McGrory would later quip about the episode that "McGrory of Arsenal just never sounded as good as McGrory of Celtic".

It was ultimately an unsuccessful season though, with Celtic finishing second in the Division One and losing the Scottish Cup Final. Despite all his disappointment, he kept up his exceptional goal scoring feats, completing back to back finishes as top League scorer in Scotland with 47 goals in 36 games. He scored a total of 53 League and Scottish Cup goals in 42 games that season, and a further nine goals in the Glasgow Cup brought his tally up to a total of 62 goals for the season. Among these goals, which again included eight hat-tricks, he created what is still a Celtic, Scottish and British record for the most goals in a top-flight League match by one player, with 8 goals in a 9–0 win over Dunfermline on 14 January 1928.

Celtic finished second in the 1928–29 league season, but were 16 points behind winners Rangers. They were knocked out of the Scottish Cup at the semi-final stage, losing 0–1 to Kilmarnock at Rugby Park. McGrory spent a lengthy spell on the sidelines after picking up a very bad injury in an appearance for the Scottish League XI at Villa Park in November 1928, and due to this prolonged period on the treatment table he missed a lot of matches and in turn his goalscoring tally was down on the previous three seasons. Nevertheless, he still managed 31 League and Scottish Cup goals in 27 games.

==== 1930s ====
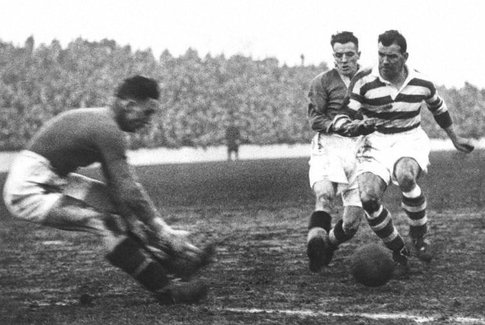
Jimmy McGrory (right) in action for Celtic during the 1930s. He is the record goal-scorer in British football, with a career total of 550 goals

No honours were achieved either in 1929–30, although McGrory continued to score regularly, netting 36 goals in 29 League and Scottish Cup games. Injuries were by now starting to take their toll on McGrory, who was always a regular target for some brutal 'defending'. He missed the first six games of season 1930–31 due to such an injury. While the League campaign was to ultimately prove disappointing, the team had shown promise and improved on the previous seasons finish of fourth place, running eventual winners Rangers close and finishing in second place only two points behind them. Celtic scored 101 goals in the process, with McGrory helping himself to a very credible 36 of them in only 29 games. The 1930–31 Scottish Cup was to prove more fruitful all round, where he ended up with a winners medal and eight goals from six games. In the Cup Final on 11 April 1931, he scored the opening goal in a 2–2 draw against Motherwell in front of crowd of 104,863 at Hampden Park, Glasgow. The replay took place on 15 April 1931, which Celtic won 4–2 thanks to two goals each from McGrory and Bertie Thomson.

Celtic found themselves way off the pace again in the 1931–32 Scottish Division One, finishing in third place, 18 points behind champions Motherwell. A huge factor in the indifferent season was the death of their goalkeeper John Thomson on 5 September 1931 at Ibrox Park. Rangers forward Sam English collided with Thomson and his knee struck the goalkeeper's temple, fracturing his skull. Thomson was rushed to the Victoria Infirmary in Glasgow, but died later that evening. The effect on the Celtic team was evident in their general performance from that point onwards. McGrory, on top of losing a teammate and friend, was succumbing to more serious injuries and missed large chunks of the season, only playing in 22 of the 38 League games. He and Celtic fared little better in the Scottish Cup, again losing out to Motherwell at the first round of entry, in round three. The injuries put paid to his usual high goal tally, and he suffered his lowest seasonal total since his first full season in 1924–25 season, with 28 goals in 23 League and Scottish Cup games.

On 14 March 1936, McGrory achieved the fastest hat-trick in Scottish League history, scoring three goals in less than 3 minutes, during a 5–0 win over Motherwell. He was allowed to leave Celtic in December 1937 to become the manager of Kilmarnock, on the condition that he retired from playing.

== International career ==
McGrory gained a total of seven caps for the Scottish national team, scoring six goals. In the mid and late 1920s he was generally overlooked, as were Dave Halliday and Hughie Ferguson, in favour of Hughie Gallacher who played 18 times in that period, scoring 24 goals in 17 victories and one draw. McGrory's full international debut was at Firhill in 1928 against Ireland when Gallacher was on a two-month suspension; Scotland lost 1–0 to an opponent Gallacher usually scored freely against. McGrory became something of a scapegoat, waiting over three years for his full international recall.

McGrory's six other caps were in the 1930s when Gallacher was unavailable due to a ban affecting non-English players playing for English clubs (Gallacher had been at the centre of this club-versus-country dispute when, under pressure from Newcastle United directors in April 1930, he played for them against Arsenal rather than for Scotland against England – Arsenal felt especially aggrieved since they had released Alex James and David Jack to play in the international at Wembley). In these six games, McGrory scored six goals, but despite this strike rate he was never given an extended run in the team; his final appearance, the only one in which he did not score aside from his debut, was also against Ireland and resulted in defeat, this time at his home club ground Celtic Park. The press were critical of the Scottish players individually and collectively, and McGrory was one of five in the Scotland team who were not selected for international duty again.

McGrory received his first calling to play for the Scottish Football League XI on 27 October 1926 to play against the Irish League XI at Tynecastle Park, scoring once in a 5–2 win. He then featured in the match with the English League XI at Filbert Street on 19 March 1927, and scored one goal in a 2–2 draw. He scored twice in a 6–2 defeat against the same opposition at Ibrox Park on 10 March 1928. McGrory played in six Inter-League matches in all, scoring six times.

== Style of play ==
Although he was only 5 ft 6ins, McGrory was renowned for his prowess and ability from headers. His trademark was an almost horizontal, bullet header, which he performed and scored regularly from and which earned him his nicknames, of the "Human Torpedo" and the "Mermaid". Johnny Paton, who played for Celtic and Chelsea, described McGrory as being "all strength and muscle" and having a "great bull neck", adding that he was "the hardest header of a ball I ever saw" and also had "a great shot in his right boot."

== Managerial career ==
=== Kilmarnock ===
McGrory became the first full-time manager of Kilmarnock in December 1937. Kilmarnock were struggling in the league, and lost their first two games under McGrory; a humiliating 9–1 rout at the hands of Celtic in his debut as manager and a 4–0 loss to Hibernian. However, the team's form improved and they went on a run of losing only once in a dozen games, and eventually managed to stay up. He also led Kilmarnock to the Scottish Cup Final, knocking out both Celtic and Rangers en route. The final took place on 23 April 1938 between Kilmarnock and East Fife, finishing in a 1–1 draw. The replay was held four days later, Kilmarnock losing 4–2.

Kilmarnock improved further in McGrory's first full season as manager, finishing in a comfortable mid-table position in the league at the end of 1938–39. They weren't able to replicate the previous season's cup form however, going out of the Scottish Cup in the second round to Hibernian. Hopes that McGrory's side of efficient journeymen and enthusiastic youngsters could progress further were quashed by Britain's declaration of war against Germany in September 1939. The Scottish League was abandoned and regional competitions organised in their place to minimise travelling across the country during wartime. Kilmarnock's ground, Rugby Park, was then requisitioned by the army in the summer of 1940 as a fuel depot. The combination of losing their ground and players being conscripted resulted in Kilmarnock stopping playing football altogether. McGrory was kept on officially as manager, but had virtually nothing to do. During this time he found work as chief storeman at a munitions factory in Ayrshire, and he also joined the Home Guard.

Kilmarnock finally returned to playing football again in the summer of 1944, although they had to play their home games at a nearby junior team's ground as Rugby Park was still being used by the army. Eventually their ground was returned to them in April 1945, and the club joined the Southern League for the forthcoming season. However, in July 1945 a Glasgow newspaper reported that McGrory would "make a sensational move soon." He himself later confirmed that Tom White, the Celtic chairman, had telephoned to arrange a meeting. McGrory duly travelled to Glasgow to speak with him, and was offered the job as manager of Celtic.

=== Celtic ===
On 24 July 1945, McGrory returned to Parkhead to manage Celtic. His first season proved to be difficult, with the side comprising an uneasy blend of veterans and youngsters. Winger Jimmy Delaney's sale to Manchester United in February 1946, after asking Celtic for a £2 rise in his weekly wage, and the transfer of Malky MacDonald to Kilmarnock further weakened the side. The season then ended in controversy when Celtic lost to Rangers in the semi-final of the Victory Cup, with numerous dubious decisions made against Celtic by a referee who appeared to be affected by alcohol. Celtic made a poor start to the following season, winning only one of their first five games. A further defeat against Third Lanark in September 1946 saw a large number of fans protest outside the ground, although it was the chairman Tom White who was subject of their criticism and not McGrory.

In March 1947, Tom White died and director Robert Kelly was elected as his successor as chairman. For the next 18 years, Kelly would be the dominant personality at Celtic Park; imposing his will in the running of the club at all levels including having direct involvement in team selection.

In 1948, the club endured an even worse season, and went into their last league game of the season with the possibility of being relegated. Celtic went on to win 3–2 against Dundee, to the relief of all associated with the club. McGrory later described Celtic's flirtation with relegation as "the worst experience I've ever had in football." In June 1948, McGrory signed Charlie Tully from Belfast Celtic for £8,000. Tully was a charismatic performer who combined audacious dribbling with outright showboating and razor sharp wit, making him hugely popular with the Celtic support. Celtic also appointed Jimmy Hogan during the summer of 1948 as a coach. He had previously worked throughout Europe, notably Hungary, and spent six years as the English FA's coach. Hogan only spent two years at Parkhead but is credited with the improvement in Celtic's football in the early 1950s.

Matters improved in the 1950s, with Bobby Evans, Bertie Peacock, Bobby Collins, along with Tully, making a positive impact on the team. In April 1951, a John McPhail goal saw Celtic defeat Motherwell 1–0 in the Scottish Cup Final for the club's first major trophy since the war. Two years later, Celtic defeated Arsenal, Manchester United and Hibernian to win the Coronation Cup, a one-off tournament held in May 1953 to commemorate the coronation of Elizabeth II.

In 1954 Celtic won their first league and cup double for forty years, and their first league title since 1938. Celtic finished five points ahead of Hearts in the league and had the best defensive record in the division (only 29 goals conceded). The Scottish Cup Final was contested between Celtic and Aberdeen. A keenly contested match was won by a Sean Fallon goal after excellent play from Willie Fernie.

He also led Celtic to their famous 7-1 Scottish League Cup Final win over Rangers in 1957, which to this day remains a record score-line in a major British cup final. The game and McGrory are remembered in the supporters' song "Hampden in the Sun". McGrory is also remembered in another popular song amongst the supporters named after his manager, the "Willie Maley Song".

His time as manager, however, is considered largely a period of underachievement, and with chairman Robert Kelly's domineering influence in the running of the club, many questioned how much say McGrory had in team selection. The years that followed the League Cup Final win over Rangers saw Celtic struggle and, despite the emergence of hugely promising players such as Billy McNeill, Paddy Crerand, Bertie Auld and Jimmy Johnstone, Celtic won no more major trophies under McGrory.

Celtic's third-place finish in the league in season 1961–62 saw them qualify for the Inter-Cities Fairs Cup in 1962–63; the club's first participation in European club competitions. Drawn against Spanish side Valencia in the first round, Celtic were beaten 4–2 in the first leg in Spain on 24 October 1962, having trailed 3–0 at half time. Bobby Carroll scored Celtic's two goals in the second half, becoming the club's first ever European goalscorer. A modicum of pride after the first leg defeat was restored, however, in the return leg in Glasgow, which finished in a 2–2 draw, albeit seeing Celtic lose the tie on aggregate and be eliminated from the competition.

The following season, 1963–64, saw Celtic return to European competition, this time in the European Cup Winners Cup. Celtic belied their mediocre domestic form in Scotland by reaching the semi-final of the tournament, eliminating Basel, Dinamo Zagreb and Slovan Bratislava en route. The first leg of the semi-final against MTK Budapest took place at Celtic Park, and goals from Jimmy Johnstone and Stevie Chalmers gave Celtic an impressive 3–0 win. A combination of tactical naïveté and questionable refereeing saw Celtic slump to a 4–0 defeat in the return leg in Hungary and go out on aggregate.

McGrory was manager for nearly 20 years, before Jock Stein succeeded him in March 1965. At this time, the Celtic board appointed McGrory to the new role of Public Relations Officer, a post he would retain until his retirement in 1979.

== Legacy ==
McGrory is the all-time leading goalscorer in top-flight British football with a total of 550 goals in 547 competitive games. This total includes 6 goals that he scored in 6 Inter-League matches for the Scottish Football League XI. McGrory is a legendary figure within Celtic's history. He is their top scorer of all time with 522 goals from 501 games, and holds their record for the most goals in a season, with 62 goals from 46 games in season 1927–28. He has also notched up a British top-flight record of 55 hat-tricks, 48 coming in League games and 7 from Scottish Cup ties. It could be argued he in fact scored 56, as he hit 8 goals in a Scottish League game against Dunfermline on 14 January 1928. The eight goals scored in that match against Dunfermline is also a British top-flight record. The boots worn by McGrory and football used in that game are on display at the Scottish Football Museum.

In 2004, he was inducted into both the Scottish Football Hall of Fame and the Scottish Sports Hall of Fame.

== Career statistics ==
The statistics below are based on research compiled by Celtic Football Club historian Pat Woods, who is the author or co-author of ten books on the club.

=== Club ===
Club	Season	League		Cup		Glasgow Cup		Glasgow Charity Cup		Total	
Club	Season	Apps	Goals	Apps	Goals	Apps	Goals	Apps	Goals	Apps	Goals
Celtic	1922–23	3	1	1	0	0	0	0	0	4	1
Clydebank (loan)	1923–24 (Note: McGrory was loaned out to Clydebank F.C. for the 1923–24 season, but returned to Celtic at the end of the season to play in two Glasgow Charity Cup ties.)	30	13	3	3	0	0	0	0	33	16
Celtic	1923–24	0	0	0	0	0	0	2	1	2	1
Celtic	1924–25	25	17	8	11	2	2	1	0	36	30
Celtic	1925–26	37	35	6	6	6	6	3	2	52	49
Celtic	1926–27	33	49 (Note: Other sources, as in John Cairney's Heroes Are Forever: The Life and Times of Celtic Legend Jimmy McGrory (2007) or the IFFHS state a total of 538 goals in all club competitions. The discrepancy with other sources arises from the fact that 48 goals instead of 49 goals are given in the Scottish league for the 1926-27 season, in contrast to other sources, as published by UEFA or RSSSF.)	6	9	2	2	0	0	41	60
Celtic	1927–28	36	47	6	6	3	9	1	0	46	62
Celtic	1928–29	21	21	6	10	4	3	3	8	34	42
Celtic	1929–30	26	32	3	4	5	4	1	1	35	41
Celtic	1930–31	29	36	6	8	2	1	1	2	38	47
Celtic	1931–32	22	28	1	0	3	2	2	0	28	30
Celtic	1932–33	25	22	8	8	3	2	2	3	38	35
Celtic	1933–34	27	17	3	1	1	1	0	0	31	19
Celtic	1934–35	27	18	4	2	1	0	1	1	33	21
Celtic	1935–36	32	50	1	0	2	0	2	1	37	51
Celtic	1936–37	25	18	8	9	0	0	0	0	35	28
Celtic	1937–38	10	5	0	0	1	1	0	0	11	6
Career total		408	409 (Note: When Jimmy McGrory finished his playing career and became the manager of Kilmarnock, in December 1937, the Dundee Evening Telegraph stated that he had scored 410 league goals. Other sources also give McGrory's final tally of league goals as 410, but still have his final number of overall career goals as 550. In late January and early February 1945, his goal scoring statistics were printed in many newspapers. These differed to McGrory's statistics published by Cairney only in that his record of league goals was given as being 410, not 408. And his number of goals in Charity Cup competitions was given as 18 goals and not 20. The following statistics for Jimmy McGrory's 550 goals were recorded in several newspapers in 1945: "His total is made up as follows: League 410, Scottish Cup 77, Glasgow Cup 33, Charity Cup 18, and internationals 12.")	70	77	35	33	21	20	534	539

=== International ===
International statistics
National team	Year	Apps	Goals
Scotland	1928	1	0
Scotland	1929	—	
Scotland	1930	—	
Scotland	1931	3	3
Scotland	1932	1	1
Scotland	1933	2	2
Total		7	6

International goals by date, venue, cap, opponent, score, result and competition
No.	Date	Venue	Cap	Opponent	Score	Result	Competition
1	28 March 1931	Hampden Park, Glasgow	2	England	2–0	2–0	1930–31 British Home Championship
2	19 September 1931	Ibrox Park, Glasgow	3	Ireland	2–1	3–1	1931–32 British Home Championship
3	31 October 1931	Racecourse Ground, Wrexham	4	Wales	3–1	3–2	1931–32 British Home Championship
4	17 September 1932	Windsor Park, Belfast	5	Ireland	4–0	4–0	1932–33 British Home Championship
5	1 April 1933	Hampden Park, Glasgow	6	England	1–0	2–1	1932–33 British Home Championship
6	1 April 1933	Hampden Park, Glasgow	6	England	2–1	2–1	1932–33 British Home Championship

=== Inter-league ===
Inter-league statistics
National team	Year	Apps	Goals
Scottish Football; League XI	1926	1	1
Scottish Football; League XI	1927	1	1
Scottish Football; League XI	1928	2	2
Scottish Football; League XI	1929	—	
Scottish Football; League XI	1930	—	
Scottish Football; League XI	1931	1	2
Scottish Football; League XI	1932	—	
Scottish Football; League XI	1933	—	
Scottish Football; League XI	1934	—	
Scottish Football; League XI	1935	1	0
Total		6	6

Inter-league goals by date, venue, cap, opponent, score and result
No.	Date	Venue	Cap	Opponent	Score	Result
1	27 October 1926	Tynecastle Park, Edinburgh	1	(Northern Ireland) Irish League XI	2–0	5–2
2	19 March 1927	Filbert Street, Leicester	2	(England) The Football League XI	2–2	2–2
3	10 March 1928	Ibrox Stadium, Glasgow	3	(England) The Football League XI	1–1	2–6
4	10 March 1928	Ibrox Stadium, Glasgow	3	(England) The Football League XI	2–6	2–6
5	7 November 1931	Celtic Park, Glasgow	5	(England) The Football League XI	1–1	4–3
6	7 November 1931	Celtic Park, Glasgow	5	(England) The Football League XI	4–3	4–3

=== Managerial record ===
Team	From	To	Record				
Team	From	To	G	W	D	L	Win %
Kilmarnock^{A}	December 1937	May 1945	74	31	17	26	41.89
Celtic	August 1945	March 1965	843	419	177	247	49.70

^{A} FibaStats includes a total of 39 games for season 1939–40, however 34 of these were for the unofficial regional league and cup competitions that were introduced during WW2. These games have been removed from the statistics in the above table.

== Honours ==
=== Player ===
St Roch's

- Scottish Junior Cup
  - Winner: 1921–22
- Scottish Junior Football League
  - Winner: 1921–22
- Inter-Parish Tournament:
  - Winner: 1921–22
- Glasgow Junior Charity Cup
  - Runner-up: 1921–22

Celtic

- Scottish League Division One
  - Winner: 1925–26, 1935–36, 1937–38
- Scottish Cup
  - Winner: 1924–25, 1926–27, 1930–31, 1932–33, 1936–37
  - Runner-up: 1925–26, 1927–28
- Glasgow Cup
  - Winner: 1926–27, 1927–28, 1928–29, 1930–31
  - Runners-up: 1924–25, 1925–26, 1929–30, 1935–36
- Glasgow Charity Cup
  - Winner: 1925–26, 1935–36, 1936–37
  - Runner-up: 1928–29, 1929–30, 1933–34
- St Vincent de Paul Charity Cup
  - Winner: 1928

=== Manager ===
Kilmarnock

- Scottish Cup
  - Runner-up: 1937–38
- St Vincent de Paul Charity Cup
  - Winner: 1938

Celtic

- Scottish League Division One
  - Winner: 1953–54
- Scottish Cup
  - Winner: 1950–51, 1953–54
  - Runner-up: 1954–55, 1955–56, 1960–61, 1962–63
- Scottish League Cup
  - Winner: 1956–57, 1957–58
  - Runner-up: 1964–65
- Coronation Cup
  - Winner: 1953
- Saint Mungo Cup
  - Winner: 1951–52
- Glasgow Cup
  - Winner: 1948–49, 1955–56, 1961–62, 1963–64
  - Runner-up: 1950–51, 1951–52, 1960–61, 1962–63
- Glasgow Charity Cup
  - Winner: 1949–50, 1952–53, 1958–59, 1960–61
  - Runner-up: 1946–47, 1947–48, 1948–49

=== Individual ===
- Scottish Football League top scorer: 1926–27, 1927–28, 1935–36
- Scottish Football Hall of Fame:
  - Inducted – 2004
- Scottish Sports Hall of Fame
  - Inducted – 2004

== See also ==
- List of footballers in Scotland by number of league goals (200+)
- List of footballers with 500 or more goals

== Notes ==
Sources

- Cairney, John (2007). Heroes Are Forever: The Life and Times of Celtic Legend Jimmy McGrory. Mainstream Publishing Company (Edinburgh) Ltd. ISBN 978-1845961039.
- Campbell, Tom; Woods, Pat (1987). The Glory & The Dream. Grafton Books. ISBN 0-586-20005-3.
- Wilson, Brian (1988). Celtic – A Century With Honour. Willow Books. ISBN 0-00-218230-0.
- McColl, Graham (2002). The Head Boys: Celtic's Managers. Mainstream Publishing Company (Edinburgh) Ltd. ISBN 978-1840187595.
