= World of Soccer Cup =

1977 football tournament

The World of Soccer Cup, an association football friendly tournament, took place in the summer of 1977, hosted by Singapore and Australia.

== Overview ==
The tournament was the idea of English entrepreneur Reg Lambourne, Strata Travel owner Tom Lawrence and Red Star Belgrade FC Secretary General Dr Miroljub Stojkovic and consisted of two competitions. The first (also known as Metro 20th Anniversary Tournament) was a straight knock-out tournament in Singapore, and the second was a mini-league in which the top two teams would play in the final. The first trophy was won by Red Star Belgrade (FK Crvena zvezda) and the second by Celtic, and was the last ever trophy Jock Stein would ever lift for Celtic.

== Teams that participated ==
- Celtic FC Latchford, McGrain, Burns, Stanton, McDonald, Aitken, Wilson, Conn, Glavin, Edvaldsson, Lennox, Doyl, Kay (Manager Jock Stein)
- Red Star Belgrade Stojanović, Jelikić, Jovanović, Muslin, Bogićević, Novković, Nikolić, Petrović, Savić, Sušić, Filipović, Šestić, Lukić (Manager Gojko Zec)
- Arsenal Rimmer, Rice, Nelson, Powling, O'Leary, Young, Brady, Hudson, Macdonald, Stapleton, Armstrong, Rix, Mathews (Manager Terry Neill)
- A select XI from the host nation
- Reilly, Harris, Wilson, Bennett, Williams, Harding, Barnes, Rooney, Kosmina, Ollerton, Sharne, Nyskohus, Maher, Abonyi (Manager Jimmy Shoulder)

Team	Notes
(Scotland) Celtic	Scottish Premier Division champions
(Socialist Federal Republic of Yugoslavia) Red Star Belgrade	Yugoslav First League champions
(England) Arsenal	
Singapore XI	Host nation (1st tournament)
Australia	Host nation (2nd tournament)

== Results ==
=== In Singapore ===
Semi-finals

12 July 1977

(England) Arsenal	1–3	(Socialist Federal Republic of Yugoslavia) Red Star Belgrade
Macdonald		Filipović, Šestić, Savić

National Stadium
Attendance: 55,000
13 July 1977

(Scotland) Celtic	5–0	Singapore XI
Conn (2), Burns, Lennox, Edvaldsson

National Stadium
Attendance: 45,000

Third place playoff

16 July 1977

(England) Arsenal	5–1	Singapore XI
Macdonald (3), Stapleton, Brady

National Stadium
Attendance: 45,000

Final

17 July 1977

(Scotland) Celtic	1–3	(Socialist Federal Republic of Yugoslavia) Red Star Belgrade
Lennox pen		Petrović, Filipović (2)

National Stadium
Attendance: 50,000
Referee: Jack Taylor

=== In Australia ===
Group stage

Team	Pld	W	D	L	GF	GA	GD	Pts
(Scotland) Celtic	3	2	1	0	7	5	+2	7
(Socialist Federal Republic of Yugoslavia) Red Star Belgrade	3	1	1	1	4	4	0	4
Australia XI	3	1	0	2	7	7	0	3
(England) Arsenal	3	1	0	2	4	6	−2	3

20 July 1977

(England) Arsenal	1–3	Australia XI
Armstrong		Kosmina, Harding, Ollerton

Sydney Sports Ground, Sydney
21 July 1977

(Scotland) Celtic	1–1	(Socialist Federal Republic of Yugoslavia) Red Star Belgrade
McDonald		Savić

Olympic Park Stadium, Melbourne
Attendance: 21,000
Referee: Jack Taylor
24 July 1977

(England) Arsenal	2–3	(Scotland) Celtic
Rice, Macdonald		Wilson (2), Glavin pen

SCG, Sydney
Attendance: 21,460
26 July 1977

(England) Arsenal	1–0	(Socialist Federal Republic of Yugoslavia) Red Star Belgrade
Brady

Hindmarsh Stadium, Adelaide
Attendance: 12,000
26 July 1977

Australia XI	2–3	(Scotland) Celtic
Barnes, Ollerton		Glavin, Edvaldsson (2)

SCG, Sydney
Attendance: 12,742
Referee: Richard Lorenc
28 July 1977

Australia XI	2–3	(Socialist Federal Republic of Yugoslavia) Red Star Belgrade
Kosmina, Harding		Savić, Šestić, Filipović

Olympic Park Stadium, Melbourne
Attendance: 10,100
Referee: Stewart Mellings

Final

31 July 1977

(Scotland) Celtic	2–0	(Socialist Federal Republic of Yugoslavia) Red Star Belgrade
McDonald, Edvaldsson

Olympic Park Stadium, Melbourne
Attendance: 23,000
Referee: Jack Taylor
