= Leo Fasan =

Italian footballer (born 1994)

Personal information
- Full name: Leonardo Fasan
- Date of birth: 4 January 1994 (age 32)
- Place of birth: San Vito al Tagliamento, Italy
- Height: 1.88 m (6 ft 2 in)
- Position: Goalkeeper

Youth career
- 2007–2010: Udinese Calcio
- 2010–2014: Celtic

Senior career*
Years	Team	Apps	(Gls)
2014–2017	Celtic	0	(0)
2017	→ Port Vale (loan)	10	(0)
2017–2018	Bury	15	(0)
2018	Kilmarnock	3	(0)
2018–2019	Falkirk	13	(0)
2020	Sicula Leonzio	2	(0)
2020–2021	Paganese	5	(0)
2021	Nola		
- * Club domestic league appearances and goals as of 18 April 2021

Leonardo Fasan (born 4 January 1994) is an Italian professional footballer who plays as a goalkeeper.

He moved from Udinese Calcio to join Scottish club Celtic in 2010, where he turned professional in August 2014. Playing for the reserve and youth teams at Celtic, he won the Glasgow Cup, Scottish Youth Cup, SPFL U20 League, and SPFL Development League. However, he never played a first-team game for Celtic and was released following a loan spell at English club Port Vale at the end of the 2016–17 season. He signed with Bury in August 2017, then with Kilmarnock in February 2018. He signed for Falkirk in June 2018 before being dislodged in January and freed in May 2019. He returned to Italy to join Sicula Leonzio in January 2020 and moved on to Paganese nine months later. He later played for Nola.

== Career ==
=== Celtic ===
Fasan was associated with Udinese Calcio, before he joined Scottish Premiership club Celtic in 2010, initially on a trial basis. He kept a clean sheet in the 2011 final of the Glasgow Cup as Celtic's under-17s beat Old Firm rivals Rangers 1–0. He was an unused substitute in the 2012 Scottish Youth Cup final, as Celtic recorded an 8–0 victory over Queen of the South at Hampden Park. He played in goal for the 2012–13 Scottish Youth Cup final, as Celtic beat Dunfermline Athletic 3–1. He turned professional at the club in August 2014 when he signed a three-year contract after impressing manager Ronny Deila during pre-season. However, he failed to establish himself as the club's second-choice goalkeeper ahead of Łukasz Załuska, Logan Bailly, or Dorus de Vries.

On 31 January 2017, he joined EFL League One side Port Vale on loan until the end of the 2016–17 season. He was signed by manager Michael Brown following the sale of Jak Alnwick to Rangers, leaving Fasan to compete with fellow youngsters Ryan Boot and Harry Pickering for a first-team place. He made his senior debut in a 3–0 defeat to Peterborough United at Vale Park on 4 February. He was named as the home team's man of the match after he saved a penalty in the first-half. He also saved a penalty in his third game for the club, during a 2–0 defeat to Millwall at The Den on 11 February; Brown said that "they were fantastic penalty saves but his game has to improve". He lost his first-team place to new signing Deniz Mehmet in mid-March, but returned to the starting eleven for the final two games of the season.

=== Bury ===
On 10 August 2017, Fasan signed for League One club Bury on non-contract terms. Manager Lee Clark signed him to provide cover for Joe Murphy whilst the "Shakers" boss attempted to sign Freddie Woodman. Fasan did not make any first-team appearances in this time.

=== Kilmarnock ===
Fasan signed a short-term contract with Scottish Premiership club Kilmarnock on 1 February 2018, becoming manager Steve Clarke's second goalkeeper signing within 24 hours following the arrival of Jasko Keranovic. He featured in four games for "Killie" in the latter half of the 2017–18 campaign. Fasan was released by Kilmarnock in May 2018, at the end of his contract.

=== Falkirk ===
On 11 June 2018, Fasan signed a one-year contract with Scottish Championship side Falkirk; manager Paul Hartley said that "I am sure he will continue to progress and develop with regular game time in the coming year, we now have three very good goalkeepers on our books [Fasan, David Mitchell and Robbie Mutch]". However, the "Bairns" registered only one victory in Fasan's first ten games for the club and he was sent off against Morton after fouling Michael Tidser. Fasan quickly fell out the picture due to a number of poor displays and was replaced instead by two other goalkeepers in turn, David Mitchell initially and then Wolves loanee Harry Burgoyne. Falkirk went on to be relegated into League One, and Fasan was released in the summer.

=== Return to Italy ===
On 24 January 2020, he returned to Italy to sign with Serie C club Sicula Leonzio. He served as backup to Marius Adamonis before the season was suspended due to the COVID-19 pandemic in Italy. The season resumed for the relegation playoffs in late June 2020, and Adamonis returned to his parent club Lazio from his loan by then. Fasan started both relegation playoff games against Bisceglie and kept a clean sheet in both as Sicula Leonzio retained their Serie C spot before the club was dissolved for financial reasons.

On 18 September 2020, he signed a two-year contract with Paganese. After starting the first 5 games of the 2020–21 Serie C season, he was moved to the bench after a 2–5 loss to Vibonese, and never made another appearance for Paganese, as first Matteo Campani and then Paolo Baiocco became first-choice goalkeepers for the club.

On 15 April 2021, he moved to Serie D club Nola.

== Career statistics ==
Appearances and goals by club, season and competition
Club	Season	League			National cup (Note: Includes Scottish Cup, FA Cup, Coppa Italia)		League cup (Note: Includes Scottish League Cup, EFL Cup)		Other		Total	
Club	Season	Division	Apps	Goals	Apps	Goals	Apps	Goals	Apps	Goals	Apps	Goals
Celtic	2014–15	Scottish Premiership	0	0	0	0	0	0	0	0	0	0
Celtic	2015–16	Scottish Premiership	0	0	0	0	0	0	0	0	0	0
Celtic	2016–17	Scottish Premiership	0	0	0	0	0	0	0	0	0	0
Celtic	Total		0	0	0	0	0	0	0	0	0	0
Port Vale (loan)	2016–17	League One	10	0	—		—		—		10	0
Bury	2017–18	League One	15	0	2	0	0	0	4 (Note: Appearances in the EFL Trophy)	0	21	0
Kilmarnock	2017–18	Scottish Premiership	3	0	1	0	—		—		4	0
Falkirk	2018–19	Scottish Championship	13	0	1	0	3	0	1	0	18	0
Sicula Leonzio	2019–20	Serie C	2	0	0	0	—		0	0	2	0
Paganese	2020–21	Serie C	5	0	0	0	—		0	0	5	0
Career total			48	0	4	0	3	0	5	0	60	0

== Honours ==
Celtic Under-20s and Academy

- Glasgow Cup: 2011
- Scottish Youth Cup: 2011–12 & 2012–13
- SPFL U20 League: 2013–14
- SPFL Development League: 2015–16
