= 2017–18 Scottish Youth Cup =

2017–18 Scottish FA Youth Cup
SFA Youth Cup

Tournament details
- Country: Scotland
- Teams: 59

Final positions
- Champions: Hibernian
- Runners-up: Aberdeen

The 2017–18 Scottish Youth Cup was the 35th season of the Scottish Youth Cup, the national knockout tournament at youth level organised by the Scottish Football Association for its full and associate member clubs. The tournament was for the under-20 age group, to complement current youth development strategies, having formerly been an under-19 competition. Players born after 1 January 1998 were eligible to play.

== Calendar ==
Round	Match date	Fixtures	Clubs
First Round		11	59 → 48
Second Round		16	48 → 32
Third Round		16	32 → 16
Fourth Round		8	16 → 8
Quarter-finals		4	8 → 4
Semi-finals		2	4 → 2
Final		1	2 → 1

== Format ==
The sixteen clubs who reached the fourth round of the 2016–17 competition received a bye to the third round of this season's tournament. The first two rounds were divided into three regional groups to reduce travelling. The tournament becomes an all-in national competition from the third round onwards.

== First round ==
=== Central Group ===
Four ties was drawn in this group with the following clubs receiving a bye to the second round:

- Alloa Athletic
- Berwick Rangers
- BSC Glasgow
- Burntisland Shipyard
- Cumbernauld Colts
- Edinburgh City
- Edusport Academy
- Hamilton Academical
- Heriot Watt University
- Livingston
- Lothian Thistle Hutchison Vale
- Queen's Park
- St Mirren
- Stirling Albion
- Tynecastle
- University of Stirling

Home team	Score	Away team
Albion Rovers	1 – 1 (a.e.t.) (6–5 pens.)	Clyde
Cowdenbeath	2 – 3	Whitehill Welfare
Dundee	1 – 2	Raith Rovers
East Kilbride	4 – 1	Airdrieonians

=== North Group ===
Five ties were drawn in this group, with the following clubs receiving byes to the second round.

- Clachnacuddin
- Forfar Athletic
- Fraserburgh
- Montrose
- Turriff United

Home team	Score	Away team
Deveronvale	2 – 1	Formartine United
Inverness Caledonian Thistle	6 – 1	Banks O'Dee
Inverurie Loco Works	2 – 2 (a.e.t.) (4–1 pens.)	Nairn County
Lossiemouth	0 – 2	Keith
Ross County	10 – 0	Elgin City

=== South Group ===
Two ties were drawn in this group, and no clubs received a bye.

Home team	Score	Away team
Bonnyton Thistle	0 – 1	Selkirk
Stranraer	4 – 2	Mid-Annandale

== Second round ==
=== Central Group ===
Home team	Score	Away team
Albion Rovers	0 – 1	Alloa Athletic
Berwick Rangers	1 – 2	University of Stirling
Burntisland Shipyard	3 – 2	Livingston
Edinburgh City	0 – 1	Raith Rovers
Edusport Academy	1 – 0	BSC Glasgow
Hamilton Academical	4 – 2 (a.e.t.)	Queen's Park
Lothian Thistle Hutchison Vale	0 – 4	Stirling Albion
St Mirren	4 – 0	Heriot Watt University
Tynecastle	1 – 4	Cumbernauld Colts
Whitehill Welfare	0 – 4	East Kilbride

=== North Group ===
Home team	Score	Away team
Deveronvale	0 – 12	Ross County
Forfar Athletic	1 – 3 (a.e.t.)	Inverness CT
Fraserburgh	3 – 0	Clachnacuddin
Inverurie Loco Works	3 – 0	Montrose
Turriff United	8 – 0	Lossiemouth

=== South Group ===
Home team	Score	Away team
Stranraer	2 – 0	Selkirk

== Third round ==
The draw for the third round was made on 10 October 2017. The following sixteen clubs entered at this stage, by virtue of having reached the fourth round of last season's competition:

- Aberdeen
- Ayr United
- Celtic
- Dundee United
- Dunfermline Athletic
- Falkirk
- Greenock Morton
- Heart of Midlothian
- Hibernian
- Kilmarnock
- Motherwell
- Partick Thistle
- Queen of the South
- Rangers
- St Johnstone
- Spartans

Home team	Score	Away team
Stirling Albion	4 − 2	Cumbernauld Colts
Hibernian	2 − 1	East Kilbride
Spartans	0 – 3	Kilmarnock
St Johnstone	2 − 1	Dundee United
Heart of Midlothian	5 − 1	Ayr United
Hamilton Academical	4 − 2	Falkirk
Inverness CT	2 − 0	University of Stirling
Motherwell	9 − 0	Burntisland Shipyard
Edusport Academy	0 − 6	Aberdeen
Ross County	2 − 0	Fraserburgh
Inverurie Loco Works	1 − 3	Raith Rovers
Greenock Morton	3 − 0	Turriff United
Alloa Athletic	0 − 8	Celtic
Rangers	5 − 2	Partick Thistle
Dunfermline Athletic	w/o	St Mirren
Queen of the South	0 − 1	Stranraer

== Fourth round ==
The fourth round draw was announced on 7 November 2017.

Home team	Score	Away team
Stranraer	0 − 11	Motherwell
Stirling Albion	3 − 4	Ross County
St Johnstone	2 − 1	Rangers
Inverness Caledonian Thistle	1 − 2	Hibernian
Kilmarnock	3 − 1	Heart of Midlothian
Hamilton Academical	2 − 4	Aberdeen
Greenock Morton	3 − 1	St Mirren
Celtic	5 − 0	Raith Rovers

== Quarter-finals ==
The quarter-finals draw was announced on 19 December 2017.

Home team	Score	Away team
Motherwell	2 − 3	Kilmarnock
Aberdeen	2 − 1	Ross County
Celtic	3 − 0	St Johnstone
Hibernian	3 − 1	Greenock Morton

== Semi-finals ==
The semi-final ties were played on 5 and 12 April 2018.

Home team	Score	Away team
Kilmarnock	0 – 3	Aberdeen
Hibernian	0 – 0 (a.e.t.) (4–2 pens.)	Celtic

== Final ==
26 April 2018
19:30

Hibernian	3 – 1	Aberdeen
Joe MacPherson (o.g.); Ryan Porteous 72'; Jamie Gullan	BBC Sport	Connor McLennan

Hampden Park
Attendance: 1,641
Referee: Iain Snedden
