= Hibernian F.C. Reserves and Academy =

Scottish reserve football teams

Hibernian Reserves
- Ground: Hibernian Training Centre; East Lothian
- Website: http://www.hibernianfc.co.uk/
Home colours	Away colours	Third colours

In addition to their first team competing in the Scottish Premiership, Hibernian F.C. also maintain further teams for younger age groups playing in competitions such as the Scottish Challenge Cup and the Scottish Youth Cup within the club's academy.

== Competitions ==
In the early 1950s, reserve teams were incorporated into the third tier of the senior Scottish Football League, with Hibernian 'A' taking part for six seasons of the arrangement. Hibs fielded a team for many years in various separate reserve competitions culminating in the Scottish Premier Reserve League, which was abandoned in 2009. An under-20 side then took part in the SPFL Development League until it was disbanded in 2018 – Hibs were its final champions. An SPFL Reserve League was set up in its place, but Hibs intimated at the end of its first season (2018–19) that they would withdraw from the Reserve League to play a variety of challenge matches. They later entered a small league (under-21 plus three overage) along with three other Scottish clubs and Brentford and Huddersfield Town from the English leagues.

Prior to the introduction of the Scottish Premier League in 1998, the Under-20s previously competed in the youth league administered by the Scottish Football League. Since 2015 it has been possible for the Hibs academy to participate in the UEFA Youth League by the Under-17 side winning the previous season's league at that age group. This was first achieved in 2022, and Hibs defeated Norwegian side Molde FK on penalties in the first round of the 2022–23 competition. They then progressed through the second round by a 3–1 aggregate score against French club Nantes, but then lost 2–1 to Borussia Dortmund in the knockout phase. They participated in the Youth League again in 2025–26, defeating FC 2 Korriku in the second round.

For the 2016–17 edition of the Scottish Challenge Cup, Under-20 teams of Premiership clubs were granted entry to compete against adult teams for the first time in the modern era. As Hibs were in the second tier that season, it was their senior team who entered the competition. Hibs under-20s first entered the Challenge Cup in the 2017–18 edition, losing 2–1 to Elgin City in the first round.

== Academy background ==
Hibs' main area of recruitment is the Lothian and Borders region around Edinburgh which has a population of around one million. They face a constant battle with rivals Heart of Midlothian to sign the most promising youngsters in the area. In the past both Hibs and Hearts have signed many players from youth club Hutchison Vale.

In 2016 the Investors in People Silver Award was bestowed on the Hibernian Academy for its work with the young people connected to the organisation.

In 2017, the Hibernian academy was one of eight across the country designated 'elite' status on the introduction of Project Brave, an SFA initiative to concentrate the development of the best young players at a smaller number of clubs with high quality facilities and coaching than was previously the case.

Although the official home of the academy teams is the club's training centre near Ormiston, the Under-20 matches usually take place at lower league stadia: Ainslie Park in Edinburgh, home of Spartans F.C. is used most frequently, and fixtures have also been played at the indoor Oriam facility which was the official venue for the reserves in the 2018–19 season.

== U20 Development squad ==
As of 26 May 2026

Note: Several players on the list have either made first team appearances for Hibs, or have been loaned to other SPFL clubs; however they can still be selected for Development League fixtures whenever available to play.

Note: Flags indicate national team as defined under FIFA eligibility rules; some limited exceptions apply. Players may hold more than one non-FIFA nationality.

No.	Pos.	Nation	Player
34	MF	SCO	Zach Bruce
36	FW	BER	Logan Jiménez
37	DF	SCO	Joseph McGrath
43	MF	SCO	Luke Davidson
46	MF	SCO	Josh McDonald
48	GK	SCO	Ryan Mallon
49	DF	SCO	Lewis Gillie
50	MF	SCO	Adam Buckley
51	DF	SCO	Arran McSporran
52	DF	SCO	Lewis McNeill
53	MF	SCO	Callum MacDonald
54	FW	SCO	Jay Gallacher

No.	Pos.	Nation	Player
55	DF	SCO	Cole Shankland
56	MF	SCO	Alisdair Burns
57	MF	SCO	Reiss Downie
59	DF	SCO	Jaden Riddell
—	GK	SCO	Ellis McGurk
—	DF	WAL	Jack Bunney
—	DF	SCO	Josh Radcliffe
—	DF	SCO	Ryan Purden
—	MF	SCO	Alistair Burns
—	MF	SCO	Jackson Thomson
—	MF	SCO	Zoba Aghanya

== Honours ==
Reserves

- SFL Division C (North-East)
  - Winners: 1949–50
  - Runners-up: 1952–53, 1954–55
- Scottish Reserve League (Note: Includes the Scottish Reserve League 1945–1949, the Scottish (Reserve) League 1955–1975, the Scottish Reserve League 1975–1998 and the Scottish Premier Reserve League 2004–2009. Any wins in the Scottish Football Alliance (1918–1939) or the SFL Division C (1949–1955) are listed separately. Any wins in the SPL Under-21 league (1998–2004) are listed in the Youth section.)
  - Winners: 1945–46, 1946–47, 1947–48, 1948–49
- Scottish Reserve League Cup
  - Winners: 1946–47, 1947–48, 1948–49, 1965–66
- Scottish 2nd XI Cup
  - Winners: 1884–85, 1938–39, 1945–46, 1946–47

Youth

- Scottish Youth Cup
  - Winners: 1992, 2009, 2018
  - Runners-up: 1990, 1991
- SPFL Development League (Note: Since 1998; also known as the Scottish Premier Under-18/Under-19/Under-20 League, SPFL Under-20 League. and CAS Elite Under-18 League)
  - Winners: 2008–09, 2017–18, 2021–22, 2024–25

== Former reserve/youth team players ==
This list focuses on the players who have graduated through Hibernian's academy, and have made at least 50 first team appearances, since the inception of the SPL in 1998. This includes a group considered a "golden generation", who helped Hibs to Scottish League Cup finals in 2004 and 2007 (the latter of which they won), and most of whom went on to play for Scotland. Many other of the club's earlier notable players also came through the youth system. Players currently at Hibs in bold.

As of July 2020

- Kenny Miller
- Tam McManus
- Ian Murray
- Garry O'Connor
- Derek Riordan
- Scott Brown
- Steven Whittaker
- Kevin Thomson
- Steven Fletcher
- Kevin McCann
- **Lewis Stevenson**
- David Wotherspoon
- **Paul Hanlon**
- Jordon Forster
- Alex Harris
- Danny Handling
- Jason Cummings
- Sam Stanton
- Oli Shaw
- **Ryan Porteous**
