= 2016–17 Scottish Youth Cup =

2016–17 Scottish FA Youth Cup
SFA Youth Cup

Tournament details
- Country: Scotland
- Teams: 55

The 2016–17 Scottish Youth Cup was the 34th season of the Scottish Youth Cup, the national knockout tournament at youth level organised by the Scottish Football Association for its full and associate member clubs. The tournament was for the under-20 age group, to complement current youth development strategies, having formerly been an under-19 competition. Players born after 1 January 1997 are eligible to play.

Motherwell were the defending champions after they beat Heart of Midlothian 5–2 in the 2016 final.

== Calendar ==
Round	Match date	Fixtures	Clubs
First Round	28 August 2016	7	55 → 48
Second Round	25 September 2016	16	48 → 32
Third Round	6 November 2016	16	32 → 16
Fourth round	4 December 2016	8	16 → 8
Quarter-finals	22 January 2017	4	8 → 4
Semi-finals	12 March 2017 & 3 April 2017	2	4 → 2
Final	26 April 2017	1	2 → 1

== Format ==
The sixteen clubs who reached the fourth round of the 2015–16 competition receive a bye to the third round of this season's tournament. The remaining thirty-nine clubs enter the first round and are initially divided into three regional groups to reduce travelling. The tournament becomes an all-in national competition from the third round onwards.

== First round ==
The draw for the first and second rounds took place on 3 August 2016. The following clubs were involved in the first round draw:

North Section	Central Section	South Section
01. Aberdeen; 02. Banks O' Dee; 03. Buckie Thistle; 04. Clachnacuddin; 05. Deveronvale; 06. Forfar Athletic; 07. Formartine United; 08. Fraserburgh; 09. Inverurie Loco Works; 10. Keith; 11. Lossiemouth; 12. Montrose; 13. Turriff United	01. Albion Rovers; 02. Alloa Athletic; 03. Berwick Rangers; 04. BSC Glasgow; 05. Clyde; 06. Cowdenbeath; 07. Dunfermline Athletic; 08. East Kilbride; 09. Edinburgh City; 10. Edusport Academy; 11. Falkirk; 12. Hamilton Academical; 13. Heriot-Watt University; 14. Hibernian; 15. Livingston; 16. Lothian Thistle Hutchison Vale; 17. Partick Thistle; 18. Preston Athletic; 19. Queen's Park; 20. Raith Rovers; 21. Spartans; 22. Stirling Albion; 23. Tynecastle; 24. Whitehill Welfare	01. Annan Athletic; 02. Stranraer; Both teams in the South Section received a bye to the Second Round

=== North Section ===
Three ties was drawn in this group with the following clubs receiving a bye to the second round:

- Montrose
- Formartine United
- Forfar Athletic
- Buckie Thistle
- Clachnacuddin
- Banks O' Dee
- Lossiemouth

The dates for the first round ties were announced on 26 August 2016.

26 August 2016	Aberdeen	Match One	Fraserburgh	Pittodrie, Aberdeen
19:30

28 August 2016	Deveronvale	Match Two	Inverurie Loco Works	Princess Royal Park, Banff
14:00

28 August 2016	Turriff United	Match Three	Keith	The Haughs, Turriff
14:00

=== Central Section ===
Four ties were drawn in this group with all the following clubs receiving byes to the second round:

- Albion Rovers
- Spartans
- Hamilton Academical
- Cowdenbeath
- Hibernian
- East Kilbride
- Falkirk
- Raith Rovers
- Lothian Thistle Hutchison Vale
- Edinburgh City
- Stirling Albion
- Tynecastle
- Livingston
- BSC Glasgow
- Whitehill Welfare
- Preston Athletic

The dates for the first round ties were announced on 26 August 2016.

28 August 2016	Clyde	1–5	Queen's Park	Broadwood Stadium, Cumbernauld
13:00

28 August 2016	Dunfermline Athletic	Match Five	Berwick Rangers	East End Park, Dunfermline
14:00

2 September 2016	Heriot-Watt University	Match Six	Partick Thistle	Oriam National Performance Centre, Edinburgh
19:30

4 September 2016	Edusport Academy	Match Seven	Alloa Athletic	Ainslie Park, Edinburgh
15:00

== Second round ==
=== North Section ===
Home team	Score	Away team
Buckie Thistle		Clachnacuddin
Banks O' Dee		Montrose
Formartine United		Lossiemouth
Winners of Match Two		Forfar Athletic
Winners of Match Three		Winners of Match One

=== Central Section ===
Home team	Score	Away team
Winners of Match Seven		Lothian Thistle Hutchison Vale
Edinburgh City		Preston Athletic
Spartans		Whitehill Welfare
Livingston		Winners of Match Five
Stirling Albion		Queen's Park
Falkirk		Albion Rovers
East Kilbride		BSC Glasgow
Hamilton Academical		Raith Rovers
Cowdenbeath		Winners of Match Six
Tynecastle		Hibernian

=== South Section ===
Home team	Score	Away team
Stranraer		Annan Athletic

== Third round ==
The following sixteen clubs entered at this stage by virtue of having reached the fourth round of last season's competition:

Third Round entrants

01. Airdrieonians
02. Ayr United
03. Celtic
04. Cumbernauld Colts
05. Dundee
06. Dundee United
07. Heart of Midlothian
08. Inverness CT

09. Kilmarnock
10. Morton
11. Motherwell
12. Queen of the South
13. Rangers
14. Ross County
15. St Johnstone
16. St Mirren

== Final ==
26 April 2017
19:45

Celtic	3 – 0	Rangers
Wardrop 37'; Miller 44'; McIlduff 70'	BBC; Herald

Hampden Park
Attendance: 2000
