= 2007–08 Scottish Youth Cup =

Tournament details
- Country: Scotland

Final positions
- Champions: Rangers

Tournament statistics
- Matches played: 57
- Goals scored: 296 (5.19 per match)

The 2007–08 Scottish Youth Cup was the 25th season of the competition. The holders Rangers defeated Celtic in the final.

== Calendar ==
Round	First match date	Fixtures	Clubs
First Round	16 September 2007	10	
Second Round	20 October 2007	16	
Third Round	8 November 2007	16	32 → 16
Fourth Round	5 December 2007	8	16 → 8
Quarter-finals	15 February 2008	4	8 → 4
Semi-finals	13 March 2008	2	4 → 2
Final	24 April 2008	1	2 → 1

== First round ==
Home team	Score	Away team
Annan Athletic	6 – 3	St Cuthbert Wanderers
Burntisland Shipyard	1 – 2	Preston Athletic
Clachnacuddin	4 – 0	Nairn County
Edinburgh City	2 – 3	Dundee
Falkirk	1 – 1 (a.e.t.) (3 – 4 pen.)	Stirling Albion
Fraserburgh	4 – 2	Elgin City
Inverurie Loco Works	5 – 0	Deveronvale
Montrose	2 – 3	Arbroath
Partick Thistle	9 – 0	Berwick Rangers
Stranraer	5 – 5 (a.e.t.) (0 – 3 pen.)	Dalbeattie Star

== Second round ==
Home team	Score	Away team
Clachnacuddin	1 – 4	Inverurie Loco Works
Airdrie United	0 – 0 (a.e.t.) (4 – 5 pen.)	St Johnstone
Annan Athletic	0 – 2	Wigtown & Bladnoch
Ayr United	3 – 1	Arbroath
Civil Service Strollers	1 – 4	Partick Thistle
Cove Rangers	11 – 0	Brora Rangers
Dundee	4 – 1	Preston Athletic
East Fife	1 – 3	Alloa Athletic
Gala Fairydean	0 – 8	Dalbeattie Star
Huntly	1 – 3	Fraserburgh
Keith	0 – 2	Peterhead
Kilmarnock	1 – 1 (a.e.t.) (4 – 5 pen.)	Raith Rovers
Motherwell	3 – 0	Queen's Park
Queen of the South	7 – 4	Threave Rovers
Spartans	0 – 0 (a.e.t.) (4 – 5 pen.)	Whitehill Welfare
Stirling Albion	2 – 4	Clyde

== Third round ==
Home team	Score	Away team
Aberdeen	13 – 0	Wigtown & Bladnoch
Alloa Athletic	2 – 7	Heart of Midlothian
Ayr United	1 – 5	Gretna
Clyde	2 – 3	Hamilton Academical
Cove Rangers	1 – 8	Livingston
Cowdenbeath	3 – 0	Inverurie Loco Works
Dumbarton	1 – 1 (a.e.t.) (2 – 4 pen.)	Raith Rovers
Dunfermline Athletic	0 – 1 (a.e.t.)	Dalbeattie Star
Hibernian	13 – 0	Queen of the South
Inverness CT	2 – 1 (a.e.t.)	Dundee
Partick Thistle	0 – 5	Celtic
Peterhead	0 – 3	Dundee United
Rangers	12 – 0	Fraserburgh
St Johnstone	1 – 1 (a.e.t.) (5 – 4 pen.)	Stenhousemuir
St Mirren	2 – 4	Motherwell
Whitehill Welfare	4 – 2	Ross County

== Fourth round ==
Home team	Score	Away team
Hamilton Academical	6 – 0	Dalbeattie Star
Livingston	4 – 0	Raith Rovers
St Johnstone	1 – 2	Aberdeen
Gretna	1 – 4	Heart of Midlothian
Whitehill Welfare	0 – 11	Rangers
Inverness CT	0 – 1	Dundee United
Celtic	3 – 2	Motherwell
Hibernian	1 – 0 (a.e.t.)	Cowdenbeath

== Quarter-finals ==
Home team	Score	Away team
Heart of Midlothian	0 – 1	Rangers
Aberdeen	4 – 3 (a.e.t.)	Livingston
Hamilton Academical	0 – 4	Dundee United
Celtic	4 – 1	Hibernian

== Semi-finals ==
30 March 2008

Dundee United	1 – 3 (a.e.t.)	Rangers
Pope	Report 1	Fleck; Little; Craig

Tannadice Park, Dundee
Referee: Stuart Stevenson

14 April 2008

Aberdeen	1 – 2	Celtic
Aluko 52'	Report 1 Report 2	Cawley 9'; Marr 75'

Pittodrie Stadium, Aberdeen

== Final ==
24 April 2008

Celtic	1 – 3 (a.e.t.)	Rangers
Sheridan 61'	Report 1 Report 2	Fleck 90', 120'; Little 96'

Hampden Park, Glasgow
Attendance: 6,045
Referee: Willie Collum

Celtic	Rangers

CELTIC:
GK	(Republic of Ireland) Paul Skinner
RB	(Republic of Ireland) Grant Gallacher	(substituted off) 109'
CB	(Scotland) Jason Marr (c)
CB	(Northern Ireland) Daniel Lafferty
LB	(Scotland) Carlo Monti
RM	(Scotland) Kevin Cawley
CM	(Republic of Ireland) Richie Towell
CM	(Scotland) Michael Tidser
LM	(Italy) Luca Santonocito	(substituted off) 67'
CF	(Republic of Ireland) Paul Cahillane
CF	(Republic of Ireland) Cillian Sheridan	(substituted off) 73'
Substitutes:
GK	(Scotland) Ryan Marshall
DF	(Scotland) Kevin Ross
MF	(Scotland) Michael Graham	(substituted on) 67'
FW	(Northern Ireland) Declan Bunting	(substituted on) 73'
FW	(Republic of Ireland) Eric Foley	(substituted on) 109'
Manager:
(Scotland) John McLaughlan

RANGERS:
GK	(Scotland) Scott Gallacher
RB	(Scotland) William McLachlan
CB	(Scotland) Ross Perry
CB	(Scotland) Ross Harvey
LB	(Scotland) Steven Kinniburgh
RM	(Scotland) Jamie Ness
CM	(Scotland) Stephen Stirling	(substituted off) 64'
LM	(Scotland) Andrew Shinnie
FW	(Turkey) Isa Bagci	(substituted off) 46'
FW	(Scotland) John Fleck (c)
FW	(Cyprus) Georgios Efrem	(substituted off) 76'
Substitutes:
GK	(Latvia) Artūrs Vaičulis
DF	(Scotland) Kyle Hutton	(substituted on) 76'
MF	(Norway) Thomas Kind Bendiksen	(substituted on) 64'
FW	(Scotland) Chris Craig
FW	(Northern Ireland) Andrew Little	(substituted on) 46'
Manager:
(Scotland) Billy Kirkwood

MATCH RULES

- 90 minutes.
- 30 minutes of extra-time if necessary.
- Penalty shoot-out if scores still level.
- Seven named substitutes.
- Maximum of three substitutions.
