= 2014–15 Scottish Youth Cup =

2014–15 Scottish FA Youth Cup
Little Big Shot Youth Cup

Tournament details
- Country: Scotland
- Teams: 51

Final positions
- Champions: Celtic
- Runners-up: Rangers

Tournament statistics
- Matches played: 34

The 2014–15 Scottish Youth Cup was the 32nd season of the Scottish Youth Cup, the national knockout tournament at youth level organised by the Scottish Football Association for its full and associate member clubs. The tournament was for the under-20 age group, to complement current youth development strategies, having formerly been an under-19 competition. Players born after 1 January 1995 were eligible to play.

Celtic won the cup, defeating Rangers after a 5-2 win in the final.

== Calendar ==
| Round | Match date | Fixtures | Clubs |
|---|---|---|---|
| First Round | Sunday 31 August 2014 | 3 | 51 → 48 |
| Second Round | Sunday 28 September 2014 | 16 | 48 → 32 |
| Third Round | Sunday 2 November 2014 | 16 | 32 → 16 |
| Fourth round | Sunday 7 December 2014 | 8 | 16 → 8 |
| Quarter-finals | Sunday 22 February 2015 | 4 | 8 → 4 |
| Semi-finals | Sunday 3 May 2015 | 2 | 4 → 2 |
| Final | Thursday 21 May 2015 | 1 | 2 → 1 |

== Format ==
The sixteen clubs who reached the fourth round of the 2013–14 competition receive a bye to the third round of this season's tournament. The remaining twenty eight clubs enter the first round and are initially divided into three regional groups to reduce travelling. The tournament becomes an all-in national competition from the third round onwards.

== First round ==
The draw for the first and second rounds took place in July 2013.

=== Central Group ===
Two ties were drawn in this group with the following clubs receiving a bye to the second round:

- Airdrieonians
- Clyde
- Dumbarton
- Dundee
- Dundee United
- East Kilbride
- Edinburgh City
- Hamilton Academical
- Livingston
- Partick Thistle
- Spartans
- Whitehill Welfare

| Home team | Score | Away team |
|---|---|---|
| Falkirk | 0–0 (a.e.t.) (5–3 pens) | Stirling Albion |
| Stenhousemuir | 4–1 | Alloa Athletic |

=== North Group ===
One tie was drawn in this group with all the following clubs receiving byes to the second round.

- Aberdeen
- Banks O'Dee
- Brora Rangers
- Clachnacuddin
- Forfar Athletic
- Fraserburgh
- Huntly
- Inverness Caledonian Thistle
- Inverurie Loco Works
- Keith
- Lossiemouth
- Montrose
- Ross County

| Home team | Score | Away team |
|---|---|---|
| Cove Rangers | 6–0 | Turriff United |

=== South Group ===
No first round ties were drawn in this group with all the following clubs receiving byes to the second round.

- Annan Athletic
- Dalbeattie Star
- Selkirk
- Threave Rovers

== Second round ==
=== Central Group ===
| Home team | Score | Away team |
|---|---|---|
| Falkirk | 2–2 (a.e.t.) (5–3 pens) | Airdrieonians |
| Spartans | 4–2 | Partick Thistle |
| Edinburgh City | 1–4 | Whitehill Welfare |
| Dundee United | 4–3 | Dundee |
| Hamilton Academical | 2–0 | Livingston |
| East Kilbride | 3–2 | Stenhousemuir |
| Clyde | 2–1 | Dumbarton |

=== North Group ===
| Home team | Score | Away team |
|---|---|---|
| Clachnacuddin | 2–0 | Keith |
| Cove Rangers | 1–0 | Brora Rangers |
| Forfar Athletic | 1–0 | Inverness Caledonian Thistle |
| Inverurie Loco Works | 7–9 | Fraserburgh |
| Montrose | 1–3 | Banks O'Dee |
| Huntly | 10–0 | Lossiemouth |
| Ross County | 0–2 | Aberdeen |

=== South Group ===
| Home team | Score | Away team |
|---|---|---|
| Dalbeattie Star | 3–4 | Selkirk |
| Annan Athletic | 7–0 | Threave Rovers |

== Third round ==
The following sixteen clubs entered at this stage by virtue of having reached the fourth round of last season's competition:

- Ayr United
- Celtic
- Cowdenbeath
- Dunfermline Athletic
- Formartine United
- Greenock Morton
- Heart of Midlothian
- Hibernian
- Kilmarnock
- Motherwell
- Queen of the South
- Queen's Park
- Raith Rovers
- Rangers
- St Johnstone
- St Mirren

The third round draw was announced on 6 October 2014.

| Home team | Score | Away team |
|---|---|---|
| Queen of the South | 5–3 | Forfar Athletic |
| Falkirk | 1–3 | St Mirren |
| Aberdeen | 1–1 (a.e.t.) (2–4 pens) | Hibernian |
| Dunfermline Athletic | 5–1 | Clyde |
| Ayr United | 2–0 | Cowdenbeath |
| Banks O'Dee | 2–3 | Selkirk |
| Dundee United | 4–0 | Formartine United |
| Raith Rovers | 0–5 | Greenock Morton |
| Rangers | 4–0 | Spartans |
| Clachnacuddin | 0–9 | Hamilton Academical |
| Celtic | 2–0 | Motherwell |
| Cove Rangers | 0–3 | St Johnstone |
| Annan Athletic | 3–1 | Fraserburgh |
| Heart of Midlothian | 3–0 | Whitehill Welfare |
| Kilmarnock | 9–0 | Huntly |
| East Kilbride | 2–2 (a.e.t.) (7–6 pens) | Queen's Park |

== Fourth round ==
The draw for the fourth round took place on 26 November 2014 with ties played on 7 December 2014

| Home team | Score | Away team |
|---|---|---|
| Greenock Morton | 4–4 (a.e.t.) (3–4 pens) | Queen's Park |
| Ayr United | 7–1 | Annan Athletic |
| Dundee United | 0–3 | Celtic |
| Hibernian | 3–1 | Kilmarnock |
| Queen of the South | 0–2 | Rangers |
| St Mirren | 7–0 | Heart of Midlothian |
| St Johnstone | 2–0 | Dunfermline Athletic |
| Hamilton Academical | 10–0 | Selkirk |

== Quarter-finals ==
| Home team | Score | Away team |
|---|---|---|
| Celtic | 2–1 | Hamilton Academical |
| Ayr United | 2–1 (a.e.t.) | St Mirren |
| Rangers | 0–0 (a.e.t.) (3–2 pens) | St Johnstone |
| Hibernian | 3–0 | Queen's Park |

== Semi-finals ==
The ties for the semi-finals were played on 3 and 7 May 2015.

| Home team | Score | Away team |
|---|---|---|
| Rangers | 1–0 | Ayr United |
| Celtic | 6–0 | Hibernian |

== Final ==
21 May 2015
15:00

| Celtic | 5 – 2 | Rangers |
|---|---|---|
| Sam Wardrop 20'; Nesbitt 26' 71' pen' (73); Luke Donnelly 32' | BBC Sport | Callum Waters og' (21); Dylan Dykes 89' |

Hampden Park
Attendance: 2000
