= Callum McGregor =

Scottish footballer (born 1993)

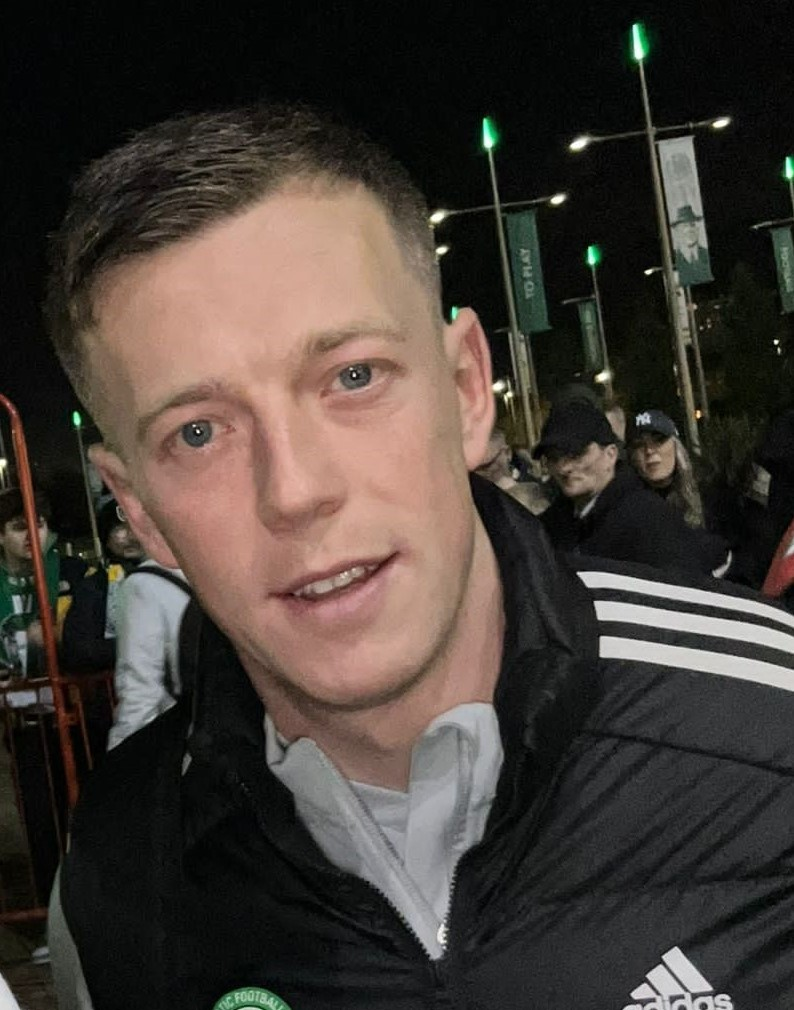
- McGregor with Celtic in 2025

Personal information
- Full name: Callum William McGregor
- Date of birth: 14 June 1993 (age 33)
- Place of birth: Glasgow, Scotland
- Height: 5 ft 10 in (1.78 m)
- Position: Midfielder

Team information
- Current team: Celtic
- Number: 42

Youth career
- 2001–2013: Celtic

Senior career*
Years	Team	Apps	(Gls)
2013–	Celtic	398	(53)
2013–2014	→ Notts County (loan)	37	(12)

International career
2008	Scotland U15	2	(0)
2008–2009	Scotland U16	3	(1)
2009–2011	Scotland U17	8	(8)
2011–2013	Scotland U19	8	(2)
2012	Scotland U20	1	(0)
2013–2014	Scotland U21	5	(1)
2017–2024	Scotland	63	(3)
- * Club domestic league appearances and goals as of 20:24, 21 November 2026 (UTC)

Callum William McGregor (born 14 June 1993) is a Scottish professional footballer who plays as a midfielder for and captains Scottish Premiership club Celtic.

A Celtic academy graduate, McGregor has spent his entire professional career at the club, except for a single season on loan at Notts County in 2013–14. He is the second-most decorated player in Celtic's history, winning eleven Scottish Premierships, seven Scottish Cups and eight Scottish League Cups. He succeeded Scott Brown as captain from the 2021–22 season. He has won the Scottish domestic treble five times, once as captain.

Internationally, McGregor represented Scotland at every youth level before making his debut for the senior side in 2017, representing them at UEFA Euro 2020 and Euro 2024. He went on to earn 63 caps before retiring from international football in 2024.

== Club career ==
=== Celtic ===
==== Early career ====
McGregor began his career with Scottish club Celtic, coming through the club's youth system alongside Dylan McGeouch, who was a teammate in youth Victory Shield internationals at Under-16 level. He scored a hat-trick for Celtic in the 8–0 2012 Scottish Youth Cup Final victory over Queen of the South at Hampden Park. McGregor appeared in four successive Scottish Youth Cup finals between 2010 and 2013, with the club winning all of them.

McGregor has spoken of the influence that the late Tommy Burns had on him as a young footballer, stating that Burns had always indicated his belief that McGregor would be the next successful product of Celtic's youth academy. McGregor particularly cites a conversation with Burns as a 13-year old as staying with him throughout his whole career, where he urged him to coincide his ability with the correct attitude and a desire to prove himself.

==== 2013–14 season: Loan to Notts County ====
McGregor joined English League One club Notts County on a five-month loan in August 2013. Among his teammates that season was fellow loanee midfielder Jack Grealish, a future England international. He scored on his debut for the "Magpies" on 7 August, in a 3–2 win over Fleetwood Town at Meadow Lane in the first round of the League Cup. Following a man of the match appearance against Crewe Alexandra where McGregor netted two goals, Notts County boss Chris Kiwomya challenged McGregor to reach 10 goals for the season in his loan spell.

McGregor played the full match in a memorable League Cup encounter for the club, facing off against a Liverpool side which featured future Rangers manager Steven Gerrard, Raheem Sterling, and Daniel Sturridge, as well as being managed by his future Celtic manager, Brendan Rodgers. County fought back from two goals down to bring the game to extra time, going on to lose the game 4-2.

McGregor's loan expired at the start of January 2014, with his 12 goals in all competitions making him the current top scorer for Notts County at that stage. Kiwomya's successor, Shaun Derry, described his departure as causing a sense of disappointment in the squad. Following the expiry of his loan in January, clubs such as Wolverhampton Wanderers were credited with an interest in McGregor. After missing three games while waiting for negotiations to conclude, it was confirmed on 24 January 2014 that McGregor's loan had been extended until the end of the season. McGregor was put straight to the Notts County squad for their game against Walsall and marked his return with a goal, a 25-yard free kick into the top left corner.

McGregor ended the season with 14 goals in all competitions and as the club's top goalscorer. Shaun Derry has since praised McGregor's attitude, describing him as "brilliant to work with", and felt that the club would not have avoided relegation that season had it not been for the efforts of McGregor and Grealish. McGregor credits the loan spell for allowing him to develop as a player and learn the game, and felt that being involved in a relegation battle where his teammate's livelihoods were on the line caused him to "grow up a bit".

==== 2014–15 season: Celtic debut and first goal ====
McGregor made his first team debut for Celtic against KR Reykjavík on 15 July 2014 in a Champions League qualifier and he scored the only goal of the game. He also scored against Legia Warsaw and NK Maribor in subsequent qualifying rounds. He made his Scottish Premiership debut against St Johnstone on 13 August 2014 and scored a goal in a 3–0 victory for Celtic. On 29 August 2014, McGregor signed a new five-year contract with Celtic.

==== 2016–17 season ====
McGregor made his 100th appearance for the club in a 2–1 win at Dundee on 19 March 2017. He scored in two successive Old Firm victories against Rangers in the space of a week in April 2017. In the 2017 Scottish Cup Final, he started in his usual midfield position but played the majority of the match at left back after an injury to Kieran Tierney. His replacement in midfield, Tom Rogic, scored the winning goal for Celtic.

==== 2017–18 season ====
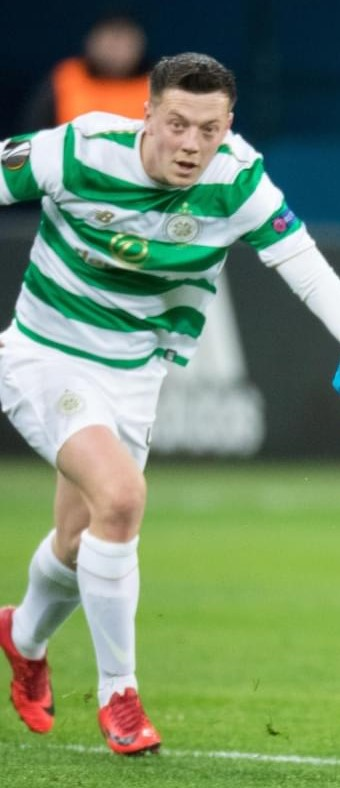
McGregor playing for Celtic in 2018

Having previously been on target in qualifying matches, on 31 October 2017 McGregor scored his first goal in the group stages of the Champions League, striking the equaliser at home to Bayern Munich (James Forrest providing the assist), although the German team responded to claim a 2–1 win.

Celtic then dropped into the 2017–18 UEFA Europa League, in which McGregor scored the only goal in the first leg of the last-32 tie with Zenit St Petersburg. On 19 May 2018, McGregor scored the opening goal in the Scottish Cup final. This secured a second consecutive domestic treble for Celtic, the first time this had been done in Scottish football history.

==== 2018–19 season ====
McGregor signed a new contract with Celtic in December 2018, due to run until the end of the 2022–23 season. He made his 200th Celtic appearance against Hibernian at Easter Road in the same month.

In May 2019, he was nominated for the season's PFA Scotland Players' Player of the Year; the award was won by teammate James Forrest. However, McGregor beat Forrest to Celtic's club awards, winning both the official and the players' category accolades. He played more minutes than any other player in world football for club and country during 2018–19, as Celtic won a third consecutive treble.

==== 2019–20 season ====
His contribution during 2019–20 was equally important, starting all 30 matches of the curtailed Premiership campaign (being off the field for just 26 minutes in total), all four of the League Cup fixtures and four of the five Scottish Cup matches – including two that were delayed until the end of the calendar year – as a fourth treble was secured. Along with continental (14) and international appearances (6), he was again among Europe's most active footballers.

==== 2020–21 season ====
In 2020–21 the club lost control of all three trophies and did not win any of their matches against Rangers, with McGregor scoring an own goal in one visit to Ibrox Stadium and being sent off in the first half of another. His contribution in terms of minutes played remained very high, with 49 appearances for Celtic (4256 minutes, not including the aforementioned Scottish Cup matches although completed within the span of that season) and 14 for the national team (954 minutes) up to the delayed UEFA Euro 2020 finals.

==== 2021–22 season: Celtic captaincy ====
On 19 July 2021, following former club captain Scott Brown's move to Aberdeen, McGregor was awarded the Celtic captaincy after making 326 appearances for the club, scoring 53 goals and winning 14 trophies – six league titles, four Scottish Cups and four League Cups. He became the 22nd captain of the club and described it as a "very proud day for myself, my family, everyone connected with myself". Celtic manager Ange Postecoglou described McGregor's appointment as "an easy decision but also the best decision", further stating "I think he's a natural leader. He's the kind of guy people gravitate towards. He drives things."

On 20 July 2021, in his first competitive appearance as club captain, McGregor was awarded Man of the Match in a 1–1 draw against FC Midtjylland in the UEFA Champions League Second qualifying round. McGregor opened the scoring in the return leg with a 25 yard volley, however Celtic lost 2-1 and were knocked out of the competition. On 24 September 2021, McGregor signed a new five-year contract with Celtic, due to expire in the summer of 2026.

==== 2022–23 season ====
McGregor became the first player to win five domestic trebles for a club, after winning both the Scottish Cup (against Inverness Caledonian Thistle) and the Scottish League Cup final (against rivals Rangers) and rounded of the season by winning an 8th league title for himself and a 53rd for Celtic.

==== 2023–24 season ====
On 10 July 2023, McGregor signed a new five-year contract with Celtic, keeping him at the club until 2028.

==== 2024–25 season ====
McGregor scored several long-range goals in the first few months of the 2024–25 season, putting him top of the goalscoring charts in the Scottish Premiership.

==== 2025–26 season ====
On 16 May 2026, on the final match of the 2025–26 season, McGregor started in Celtic's 3–1 victory over Hearts of Midlothian. The match saw Celtic win their fifth consecutive Scottish Premiership title, and their 56th title in the club's history.

== International career ==
Making his debut in October 2013, McGregor made five appearances and scored one goal for the Scotland national under-21 team. He was added to the full Scotland senior squad for the first time in August 2014, soon after he broke into the Celtic first team.

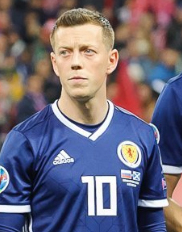
McGregor lining up for Scotland in 2019

In October 2017, McGregor was once again included in the full squad for two 2018 World Cup qualifiers against Slovakia and Slovenia, but remained on the bench during both games. He made his debut a month later, starting in a friendly against the Netherlands.

In late 2020 he scored in penalty shootouts against both Israel and Serbia as Scotland won the 2018–19 UEFA Nations League C playoffs and qualified for the UEFA Euro 2020 finals tournament (played in 2021; delayed by the COVID-19 pandemic in Europe), their first such achievement in 23 years. He scored his first international goal during the final group fixture of the tournament against Croatia.

McGregor was selected in the Scotland squad for UEFA Euro 2024. He played in the opening game of the tournament against hosts Germany on 14 June 2024; his 31st birthday, in a 5–1 defeat in Munich. In Scotland's second fixture on 19 June, McGregor assisted Scott McTominay's opening goal as the team drew 1–1 with Switzerland. He went on to start against Hungary in the third match on 23 June, which Scotland lost 1–0 to finish bottom of Group A with one point from three matches.

On 9 August 2024, McGregor announced his retirement from international football.

== Personal life ==
McGregor was a pupil at Lochend Community High School in Easterhouse. In February 2016, McGregor was stopped by the police and charged with driving under the influence of alcohol, having already been convicted and banned for speeding the previous year; he was later disqualified for 12 months.

== Career statistics ==
=== Club ===
As of match played 21 November 2026

Appearances and goals by club, season and competition
Club	Season	League			National cup (Note: Includes FA Cup, Scottish Cup)		League cup (Note: Includes Football League Cup, Scottish League Cup)		Europe		Other		Total	
Club	Season	Division	Apps	Goals	Apps	Goals	Apps	Goals	Apps	Goals	Apps	Goals	Apps	Goals
Notts County (loan)	2013–14	League One	37	12	1	0	2	1	—		1 (Note: Appearance in Football League Trophy)	1	41	14
Celtic	2014–15	Scottish Premiership	18	2	0	0	2	0	11 (Note: Six appearances and three goals in UEFA Champions League, five appearances in UEFA Europa League)	3	—		31	5
Celtic	2015–16	Scottish Premiership	27	4	3	1	2	0	2 (Note: Appearances in UEFA Europa League)	1	—		34	6
Celtic	2016–17	Scottish Premiership	31	6	4	1	2	0	9 (Note: Appearances in UEFA Champions League)	0	—		46	7
Celtic	2017–18	Scottish Premiership	36	7	5	2	4	1	10 (Note: Eight appearances and one goal in UEFA Champions League, two appearances and one goal in UEFA Europa League)	2	—		55	12
Celtic	2018–19	Scottish Premiership	35	3	4	0	4	0	16 (Note: Six appearances and two goals in UEFA Champions League, ten appearances and one goal in UEFA Europa League)	3	—		59	6
Celtic	2019–20	Scottish Premiership	30	9	4 (Note: Includes two appearances made in late 2020 due to postponements)	1	4	1	14 (Note: Five appearances and two goals in UEFA Champions League, nine appearances in UEFA Europa League)	2	—		52	13
Celtic	2020–21	Scottish Premiership	37	3	1	0	1	0	10 (Note: Two appearances in UEFA Champions League, eight appearances and one goal in UEFA Europa League)	1	—		49	4
Celtic	2021–22	Scottish Premiership	33	2	3	1	3	0	13 (Note: Two appearances and one goal in UEFA Champions League, nine appearances in UEFA Europa League, two appearances in UEFA Europa Conference League)	1	—		52	4
Celtic	2022–23	Scottish Premiership	31	4	5	0	3	1	3	0	—		42	5
Celtic	2023–24	Scottish Premiership	35	2	3	0	1	0	6	0	—		45	2
Celtic	2024–25	Scottish Premiership	35	8	5	2	4	0	10	0	—		54	10
Celtic	2025–26	Scottish Premiership	37	2	4	0	4	1	12 (Note: Two appearances in UEFA Champions League, ten appearances in UEFA Europa League)	0	—		57	3
Celtic	2026–27	Scottish Premiership	13	1	0	0	2	0	6 (Note: Two appearances and one goal in UEFA Champions League, three appearances in UEFA Europa League)	1	—		21	2
Celtic	Total		398	53	41	8	36	4	122	14	—		597	79
Career total			435	65	42	8	38	5	122	14	1	1	638	93

=== International ===
As of match played 23 June 2024

Appearances and goals by national team and year
National team	Year	Apps	Goals
Scotland	2017	1	0
Scotland	2018	8	0
Scotland	2019	10	0
Scotland	2020	7	0
Scotland	2021	15	1
Scotland	2022	8	1
Scotland	2023	9	1
Scotland	2024	5	0
Total		63	3

Scores and results list Scotland's goal tally first, score column indicates score after each McGregor goal.

List of international goals scored by Callum McGregor
No.	Date	Venue	Opponent	Score	Result	Competition
1	22 June 2021	Hampden Park, Glasgow, Scotland	Croatia	1–1	1–3	UEFA Euro 2020
2	1 June 2022	Hampden Park, Glasgow, Scotland	Ukraine	1–2	1–3	2022 FIFA World Cup qualification
3	20 June 2023	Hampden Park, Glasgow, Scotland	Georgia	1–0	2–0	UEFA Euro 2024 qualifying

== Honours ==
Celtic Youth

- SPL U-19 League (2): 2009–10, 2010–11
- Scottish Youth Cup (4): 2009–10, 2010–11, 2011–12, 2012–13

Celtic

- Scottish Premiership (11): 2014–15, 2015–16, 2016–17, 2017–18, 2018–19, 2019–20, 2021–22, 2022–23, 2023–24, 2024–25, 2025–26
- Scottish Cup (7): 2016–17, 2017–18, 2018–19, 2019–20, 2022–23, 2023–24, 2025–26
- Scottish League Cup (8): 2014–15, 2016–17, 2017–18, 2018–19, 2019–20, 2021–22, 2022–23, 2024–25

Individual

- PFA Scotland Team of the Year (Premiership) (4): 2018–19, 2021–22, 2022–23 2023–24
- PFA Scotland Players' Player of the Year: 2021–22
- Scottish Premiership Player of the Month: August 2024

== See also ==
- List of Scotland national football team captains
