= Craig Halkett =

Scottish footballer

Personal information
- Full name: Craig Peter Halkett
- Date of birth: 29 May 1995 (age 31)
- Place of birth: Kirkintilloch, Dunbartonshire, Scotland
- Height: 1.83 m (6 ft 0 in)
- Position: Defender

Team information
- Current team: Heart of Midlothian
- Number: 4

Youth career
- Rosebank United
- 2010–2014: Rangers

Senior career*
Years	Team	Apps	(Gls)
2014–2016	Rangers	0	(0)
2014	→ Clyde (loan)	12	(0)
2015	→ Berwick Rangers (loan)	4	(0)
2016–2019	Livingston	117	(16)
2019–	Heart of Midlothian	137	(9)

International career
2014	Scotland U19	1	(0)
- * Club domestic league appearances and goals as of 12 May 2026

Craig Peter Halkett (born 29 May 1995) is a Scottish footballer who plays as defender for and captains Scottish Premiership club Heart of Midlothian.

Initially a striker in his youth, Halkett joined Rangers at age fourteen before being moved to defensive roles and being loaned out to Scottish League Two clubs Clyde and Berwick Rangers. After being released by Rangers, Halkett spent several years at Livingston, making over 100 appearances, before signing a contract with Heart of Midlothian in 2019.

== Club career ==
=== Rangers ===
Raised in Kirkintilloch and a boyhood Rangers fan, Halkett joined the club as a youngster. Initially playing as a striker, he was moved into more defensive roles by youth coach Alan Kernaghan. After winning the Scottish Youth Cup in 2014, he was loaned out twice, to Clyde and Berwick Rangers, both playing in the fourth tier.

=== Livingston ===
In January 2016, Halkett was informed by Rangers that there was no immediate prospect of him progressing to the first team and he left the Ibrox club without having made a senior appearance, joining then Scottish Championship side Livingston. He scored his first professional goal against Rangers in a 1–0 win for Livingston on 26 April 2016.

The Lions were relegated from the Championship at the end of his first campaign in a play-off, but Halkett became an increasingly important player for the West Lothian side, helping them to immediately return from League One in 2016–17, followed by a second consecutive promotion to the Scottish Premiership after finishing runners-up in the regular season, once more via the play-offs.

Halkett was made club captain, and was an important part of Livingston's 2018–19 season, with the team's defence gaining much praise with the relatively few number of goals conceded compared to similarly-placed teams in the league.

=== Hearts ===
In April 2019, Halkett signed a pre-contract agreement with Hearts. He suffered a knee injury in October 2019, and it was announced he would be out for 10 weeks.

On 11 January 2022, Halkett signed a new two-and-a-half-year contract with Hearts, keeping him at the club until the end of the 2023–24 season.

== International career ==
Halkett represented Scotland once, at under-19 level in 2014. He received his first call-up to the senior Scotland squad in March 2022.

== Career statistics ==
As of 12 May 2026

Appearances and goals by club, season and competition
Club	Season	League			Scottish Cup		League Cup		Other		Total	
Club	Season	Division	Apps	Goals	Apps	Goals	Apps	Goals	Apps	Goals	Apps	Goals
Rangers	2014–15	Scottish Championship	0	0	0	0	0	0	0	0	0	0
Rangers	2015–16	Scottish Championship	0	0	0	0	0	0	0	0	0	0
Rangers	Total		0	0	0	0	0	0	0	0	0	0
Clyde (loan)	2014–15	Scottish League Two	10	0	2	0	0	0	0	0	12	0
Berwick Rangers	2015–16	Scottish League Two	4	0	0	0	0	0	0	0	4	0
Livingston	2015–16	Scottish Championship	15	1	0	0	0	0	2 (Note: Appearances in the Championship play-offs)	1	17	2
Livingston	2016–17	Scottish League One	33	1	2	0	4	0	4 (Note: Appearances in the Scottish Challenge Cup)	0	43	1
Livingston	2017–18	Scottish Championship	35	7	2	0	6	1	6	0	49	8
Livingston	2018–19	Scottish Premiership	34	7	1	0	5	0	0	0	40	7
Livingston	Total		117	16	5	0	15	1	12	1	149	18
Heart of Midlothian	2019–20	Scottish Premiership	23	2	5	1	5	4	0	0	33	7
Heart of Midlothian	2020–21	Scottish Championship	27	0	0	0	2	1	0	0	29	1
Heart of Midlothian	2021–22	Scottish Premiership	28	2	4	0	5	0	0	0	37	2
Heart of Midlothian	2022–23	Scottish Premiership	6	0	0	0	0	0	2	0	8	0
Heart of Midlothian	2023–24	Scottish Premiership	8	0	2	0	0	0	0	0	10	0
Heart of Midlothian	2024–25	Scottish Premiership	15	1	2	0	1	0	1	0	19	1
Heart of Midlothian	2025–26	Scottish Premiership	30	4	1	0	4	2	0	0	35	6
Heart of Midlothian	Total		137	9	14	1	17	7	3	0	171	17
Career total			269	25	21	1	32	8	15	1	337	35

== Honours ==
Rangers Academy

- Scottish Youth Cup: 2013–14

Livingston

- Scottish League One: 2016–17

Heart of Midlothian

- Scottish Championship: 2020–21
- Scottish Cup: runner-up 2019–20

Individual

- PFA Scotland Team of the Year (Premiership): 2018-19, 2025–26
