= 2008–09 Scottish Youth Cup =

Tournament details
- Country: Scotland

Final positions
- Champions: Hibernian
- Runners-up: Rangers

Tournament statistics
- Matches played: 57

The 2008–09 Scottish Youth Cup was the 26th season of the competition. The holders Rangers were defeated by under-19 league winners Hibernian in the final.

== Calendar ==
Round	First match date	Fixtures	Clubs
First Round	14 September 2008	5	
Second Round	12 October 2008	18	
Third Round	7 November 2008	16	32 → 16
Fourth Round	5 December 2008	8	16 → 8
Quarter-finals	15 February 2009	4	8 → 4
Semi-finals	28 March 2009	2	4 → 2
Final	29 April 2009	1	2 → 1

== First round ==
Home team	Score	Away team
Falkirk	2 – 1	Dunfermline Athletic
Fraserburgh	1 – 3	Deveronvale
Spartans	8 – 2	Berwick Rangers
Stranraer	4 – 3	Newton Stewart
Wigtown & Bladnoch	0 – 9	Annan Athletic

== Second round ==
Home team	Score	Away team
Annan Athletic	1 – 4	Gala Fairydean
Ayr United	2 – 2 (a.e.t.) (3 – 5 pen.)	Kilmarnock
Clachnacuddin	4 – 0	Cove Rangers
East Stirlingshire	1 – 5	Dumbarton
Edinburgh City	3 – 2	Airdrie United
Falkirk	6 – 0	Spartans
Huntly	2 – 2 (a.e.t.) (4 – 5 pen.)	Deveronvale
Keith	1 – 3	Inverurie Loco Works
Nairn County	3 – 7	Brora Rangers
Preston Athletic	3 – 3 (a.e.t.) (3 – 5 pen.)	Civil Service Strollers
Queen's Park	5 – 0	Alloa Athletic
Queen of the South	2 – 0	Threave Rovers
Stenhousemuir	1 – 0	Clyde
St Mirren	3 – 1	Montrose
Stirling Albion	0 – 2	Dundee
Partick Thistle	1 – 0	Arbroath
Ross County	3 – 0	Elgin City
St Cuthbert Wanderers	0 – 7	Stranraer

== Third round ==
Home team	Score	Away team
Civil Service Strollers	2 – 0	Deveronvale
Cowdenbeath	4 – 3 (a.e.t.)	Partick Thistle
Dumbarton	3 – 2	Edinburgh City
Falkirk	1 – 0	Aberdeen
Hamilton Academical	5 – 0	Clachnacuddin
Heart of Midlothian	7 – 0	Queen of the South
Inverness CT	8 – 2	Annan Athletic
Inverurie Loco Works	0 – 6	Raith Rovers
Livingston	2 – 1	Dundee
Motherwell	4 – 0	Kilmarnock
Queen's Park	3 – 2	St Johnstone
Rangers	6 – 0	Brora Rangers
Ross County	5 – 1	Dalbeattie Star
Stenhousemuir	0 – 2	Hibernian
Stranraer	0 – 11	Celtic
St Mirren	1 – 0	Dundee United

== Fourth round ==
Home team	Score	Away team
St Mirren	0 – 2	Inverness CT
Falkirk	3 – 2 (a.e.t.)	Heart of Midlothian
Queen's Park	2 – 2 (a.e.t.) (3 – 5 pen.)	Hamilton Academical
Rangers	3 – 1	Dumbarton
Ross County	0 – 8	Hibernian
Celtic	7 – 0	Cowdenbeath
Raith Rovers	6 – 1	Civil Service Strollers
Motherwell	2 – 1	Livingston

== Quarter-finals ==
Home team	Score	Away team
Hamilton Academical	0 – 2	Falkirk
Hibernian	5 – 0	Raith Rovers
Motherwell	3 – 4 (a.e.t.)	Rangers
Inverness CT	0 – 0 (a.e.t.) (6 – 5 pen.)	Celtic

== Semi-finals ==
28 March 2009

Rangers	6 – 2	Inverness CT

29 March 2009

Falkirk	0 – 3	Hibernian

== Final ==
29 April 2009

Rangers	1 – 2 (a.e.t.)	Hibernian
Campbell 47'	Report1; Report2	Byrne 32', 120'

Hampden Park, Glasgow
Attendance: 4,205
Referee: Euan Norris

Rangers	Hibernian

RANGERS:
GK	(Scotland) Grant Adam	(substituted off) 72'
RB	(Scotland) Darren Cole
CB	(Scotland) Ross Perry
CB	(Scotland) Danny Wilson
LB	(Scotland) Gregg Wylde
RM	(Scotland) Kyle Hutton
CM	(Scotland) Stephen Stirling
CM	(Scotland) Jamie Ness
LM	(Scotland) Kal Naismith	(substituted off) 85'
CF	(Scotland) Archie Campbell
CF	(England) Kane Hemmings	(substituted off) 65'
Substitutes:
GK	(Latvia) Artūrs Vaičulis	(substituted on) 72'
DF	(Scotland) Scott Durie
MF	(Scotland) Gordon Dick	(substituted on) 65'
MF	(Scotland) Dylan McGeouch
FW	(Turkey) Isa Bagci	(substituted on) 85'
Manager:
(Scotland) Billy Kirkwood

HIBERNIAN:
GK	(England) Thomas Flynn
RB	(Scotland) Ally Park
CB	(Scotland) Ewan Moyes	(substituted off) 111'
CB	(Scotland) Scott Smith
LB	(Scotland) Callum Booth
RM	(Scotland) Ollie Russell
CM	(Scotland) David Wotherspoon
CM	(Scotland) Lee Currie
LM	(Scotland) Fergus Bell	(substituted off) 88'
CF	(Republic of Ireland) Kurtis Byrne
CF	(Scotland) Patrick Deane	(substituted off) 82'
Substitutes:
GK	(Scotland) Lewis Graham
DF	(Scotland) Matthew Welch	(substituted on) 111'
MF	(Scotland) Darren Kelly	(substituted on) 88'
MF	(Scotland) Keith Murray
FW	(Scotland) Scott Taggart	(substituted on) 82'
Manager:
(Scotland) Alistair Stevenson

MATCH RULES

- 90 minutes.
- 30 minutes of extra-time if necessary.
- Penalty shoot-out if scores still level.
- Seven named substitutes.
- Maximum of three substitutions.
