= 2015–16 Scottish Youth Cup =

2015–16 Scottish FA Youth Cup
SFA Youth Cup

Tournament details
- Country: Scotland
- Teams: 54

Final positions
- Champions: Motherwell
- Runners-up: Hearts

The 2015–16 Scottish Youth Cup is the 33rd season of the Scottish Youth Cup, the national knockout tournament at youth level organised by the Scottish Football Association for its full and associate member clubs. The tournament was for the under-20 age group, to complement current youth development strategies, having formerly been an under-19 competition. Players born after 1 January 1996 are eligible to play.

== Calendar ==
| Round | Match date | Fixtures | Clubs |
|---|---|---|---|
| First Round | | 6 | 54 → 44 |
| Second Round | | 16 | 44 → 28 |
| Third Round | | 16 | 32 → 16 |
| Fourth round | | 8 | 16 → 8 |
| Quarter-finals | | 4 | 8 → 4 |
| Semi-finals | | 2 | 4 → 2 |
| Final | | 1 | 2 → 1 |

== Format ==
The sixteen clubs who reached the fourth round of the 2014–15 competition receive a bye to the third round of this season's tournament. The remaining thirty-eight clubs enter the first round and are initially divided into three regional groups to reduce travelling. The tournament becomes an all-in national competition from the third round onwards.

== First round ==
The draw for the first and second rounds took place on 15 August 2015.

=== Central Group ===
Three ties was drawn in this group with the following clubs receiving a bye to the second round:

- Airdrieonians
- Alloa Athletic
- BSC Glasgow
- Civil Service Strollers
- Dundee
- East Stirlingshire
- Falkirk
- Heriot Watt University
- Lothian Thistle Hutchinson Vale
- Motherwell
- Partick Thistle
- Spartans
- Stenhousemuir
- Stirling Albion
- Whitehill Welfare

| Home team | Score | Away team |
|---|---|---|
| Preston Athletic | 3 – 1 | East Kilbride |
| Edusport Academy | 5 – 2 | Dumbarton |
| Edinburgh City | 1 – 3 | Cumbernauld Colts |

=== North Group ===
Two ties were drawn in this group with all the following clubs receiving byes to the second round.

- Aberdeen
- Banks O'Dee
- Clachnacuddin
- Deveronvale
- Huntly
- Inverness Caledonian Thistle
- Lossiemouth
- Ross County
- Turriff United

| Home team | Score | Away team |
|---|---|---|
| Montrose | 1 – 0 | Formartine United |
| Inverurie Loco Works | 3 – 1 | Fraserburgh |

=== South Group ===
One tie were drawn in this group with all the following club receiving a bye to the second round.

- Dalbeattie Star

| Home team | Score | Away team |
|---|---|---|
| Stranraer | 3 – 2 | Berwick Rangers |

== Second round ==
=== Central Group ===
| Home team | Score | Away team |
|---|---|---|
| Preston Athletic | 2 – 1 (a.e.t.) | Civil Service Strollers |
| Stenhousemuir | 2 – 0 | BSC Glasgow |
| Falkirk | 1 – 3 | East Stirlingshire |
| Airdrieonians | 3 – 1 | Lothian Vale Hutchinson Vale |
| Motherwell | 1 – 0 | Partick Thistle |
| Whitehill Welfare | 0 - 8 | Dundee |
| Edusport Academy | 5 – 1 | Spartans |
| Heriot Watt University | 0 – 2 | Alloa Athletic |

=== North Group ===
| Home team | Score | Away team |
|---|---|---|
| Inverness CT | 2 – 1 | Montrose |
| Banks O'Dee | 7 – 4 (a.e.t.) | Clachnacuddin |
| Aberdeen | 6 – 1 | Fraserburgh |
| Forfar Athletic | 11 – 2 | Turriff United |
| Deveronvale | 4 – 1 | Huntly |
| Ross County | 11 – 0 | Lossiemouth |

=== South Group ===
| Home team | Score | Away team |
|---|---|---|
| Dalbeattie Star | 1 – 5 | Stranraer |

== Third round ==
The following sixteen clubs entered at this stage by virtue of having reached the fourth round of last season's competition:

- Annan Athletic
- Ayr United
- Celtic
- Dundee United
- Dunfermline Athletic
- Greenock Morton
- Hamilton Academical
- Hamilton Academical
- Heart of Midlothian
- Hibernian
- Kilmarnock
- Queen of the South
- Queen's Park
- Rangers
- Selkirk
- St Johnstone

The third round draw was announced on 22 September 2015.

| Home team | Score | Away team |
|---|---|---|
| Dundee | 4 − 1 | Hibernian |
| Airdrieonians | 4 − 0 | Banks O'Dee |
| Aberdeen | 2 – 3 | Kilmarnock |
| East Stirlingshire | 4 − 5 | Heart of Midlothian |
| Forfar Athletic | 0 − 2 | Greenock Morton |
| Preston Athletic | 0 − 6 | St Mirren |
| Dunfermline Athletic | 1 − 2 (a.e.t.) | Inverness Caledonian Thistle |
| Deveronvale | 1 − 4 | Cumbernauld Colts |
| Annan Athletic | 0 − 2 | Ross County |
| Dundee United | 5 − 1 | Alloa Athletic |
| Queen of the South | 2 − 1 | Edusport Academy |
| Motherwell | 5 − 0 | Stenhousemuir |
| St Johnstone | 3 − 0 | Stranraer |
| Rangers | 4 − 1 | Queen's Park |
| Hamilton Academical | 0 − 3 | Celtic |
| Selkirk | 0 − 25 | Ayr United |

== Fourth round ==
The fourth round draw was announced on 4 November 2015.

| Home team | Score | Away team |
|---|---|---|
| Greenock Morton | 1 − 2 | Ross County |
| Queen of the South | 4 − 2 | Cumbernauld Colts |
| Motherwell | 1 − 0 | Kilmarnock |
| Heart of Midlothian | 4 − 2 | Inverness Caledonian Thistle |
| Dundee United | 2 − 1 (a.e.t.) | Dundee |
| Ayr United | 3 − 2 | Airdrieonians |
| St Mirren | 2 − 1 | Rangers |
| St Johnstone | 2 − 1 | Celtic |

== Quarter-finals ==
The quarter-finals draw was announced on 16 December 2015.

| Home team | Score | Away team |
|---|---|---|
| St Mirren | 0 − 1 | Ross County |
| Dundee United | 3 − 0 | Ayr United |
| St Johnstone | 0 − 1 | Motherwell |
| Heart of Midlothian | 5 − 0 | Queen of the South |

== Semi-finals ==
The ties for the semi-finals were played on 6 and 8 March 2016.

| Home team | Score | Away team |
|---|---|---|
| Ross County | 0 – 3 | Motherwell |
| Heart of Midlothian | 2 – 0 | Dundee United |

== Final ==
27 April 2016
19:30

| Heart of Midlothian | 2 – 5 | Motherwell |
|---|---|---|
| Jordan McGhee; Dario Zanatta 65' | BBC Sport Report; The Scotsman | Dylan Mackin; Daniel Baur 38' (o.g.); David Ferguson 62'; Robbie Leitch 83'; Dylan Falconer 90' |

Hampden Park
Attendance: 2,769
Referee: Stewart Luke
