= Scottish Premier Reserve League =

- Founded: 1998
- Country: Scotland
- Divisions: 1
- Number of clubs: 12
- Level on pyramid: 1
- Current champions: Celtic reserves (2008–09)

The Scottish Premier Reserve League was the top reserve team league for Scottish football teams. The competition started at the same time as the inauguration of the Scottish Premier League in the 1998–99 season. It was initially an under-21 league, with a quota of five players over the age limit allowed per team in any match. The league was discontinued after the 2008–09 season. Since then, alternative structures have been mooted, such as allowing the bigger clubs to field reserve teams in the lower divisions of the Scottish Football League.

== Past winners ==
=== Under-21 League ===
Season	Winner	Runner-up
1998–99	St Johnstone Reserves	Rangers Reserves
1999–00	Heart of Midlothian Reserves	Hibernian Reserves
2000–01	Rangers Reserves	Celtic Reserves
2001–02	Celtic Reserves	Livingston Reserves
2002–03	Celtic Reserves	Rangers Reserves
2003–04	Celtic Reserves	Heart of Midlothian Reserves

=== Reserve League ===
Season	Winner	Runner-up
2004–05	Celtic Reserves	Livingston Reserves
2005–06	Celtic Reserves	Rangers Reserves
2006–07	Celtic Reserves	Motherwell Reserves
2007–08	Celtic Reserves	Inverness CT Reserves
2008–09	Celtic Reserves	Heart of Midlothian Reserves

== See also ==
- SPFL Development League (originally the concurrent SPL under-18 competition from 1998, taken over by the Scottish Professional Football League and changed to under-20s)
- SPFL Reserve League (a similar reserves competition operated by the SPFL since 2018, replacing the above Development League)
