= John Reames Memorial Trophy =

- Founded: 2008
- Region: The FA (England)
- Teams: 2
- Current champions: Gainsborough Trinity (1st title)
- Most championships: Lincoln City (6 titles)

The John Reames Memorial Trophy is an annual one-off contest between Lincoln City and invited opposition at Sincil Bank Stadium (home of the Imps) in Lincoln, Lincolnshire, East Midlands. Since inauguration in 2008, the trophy is named after and played in honour of former long-term Lincoln City chairman John Reames.

Year	Winners	Score	Runners up	Ref
2008	Lincoln City	6–0	Lincoln United	
2009				
2010	Celtic	4–1	Lincoln City	
2011	Nottingham Forest	1–0	Lincoln City	
2012				
2013	Lincoln City	1–0	Boston United	
2014	Lincoln City	2–0	Doncaster Rovers	
2015	Lincoln City	1–0	Norwich City	
2016	Lincoln City		Crewe Alexandra	
2017	Peterborough United	3–2	Lincoln City	
2018	Blackburn Rovers	1–0	Lincoln City	
2019	Lincoln City / Nottingham Forest	1–1	Trophy Shared	
2020				
2021	Gainsborough Trinity	2–1	Lincoln City	
