= Hibernian Training Centre =

Training ground in Ormiston, Scotland

- Interactive map of Hibernian Training Centre
- Address: East Mains; Ormiston; Tranent; East Lothian; EH35 5NG
- Coordinates: 55.920883°N 2.930796°W
- Owner: Hibernian FC
- Type: Football Training Ground

Construction
- Opened: 2007
- Cost: £5m

Website
- Hibernian FC

Hibernian Training Centre is the training ground for Hibernian FC, in Ormiston, East Lothian. The training ground houses both the first team and the youth academy.

== Construction ==
Hibs announced plans for a dedicated training centre in May 2006. Planning permission was granted in September 2006. Delays in obtaining building warrants meant that construction work did not begin until March 2007. The first team squad moved to the complex on 19 December 2007.

== Facilities ==
The training ground is situated on 24 acres and features 5 full-size grass pitches, one of which is a floodlit along with an additional floodlit synthetic pitch and specialist training areas for fitness work and goalkeepers, as well as an exact recreation of the pitch at Easter Road. Inside the training complex there are changing facilities for both the senior squad and the academy players. The indoor facilities include a gymnasium, training pitch, hydrotherapy pools, sauna, physiotherapy rooms, media centre, dining suites and video lounges.

Some of Hibs' youth team matches are played at the training centre.
