= 2013–14 Scottish Youth Cup =

2013–14 Scottish FA Youth Cup
SFA Youth Cup

Tournament details
- Country: Scotland
- Teams: 44

Final positions
- Champions: Rangers
- Runners-up: Heart of Midlothian

The 2013–14 Scottish Youth Cup was the 31st season of the Scottish Youth Cup, the national knockout tournament at youth level organised by the Scottish Football Association for its full and associate member clubs. The tournament was for the under-20 age group, to complement current youth development strategies, having formerly been an under-19 competition. Players born after 1 January 1994 were eligible to play.

Rangers won the cup, defeating Heart of Midlothian after a penalty shootout in the final.

== Calendar ==
Round	Match date	Fixtures	Clubs
First Round	Sunday 25 August 2013	1	44 → 43
Second Round	Sunday 22 September 2013	11	43 → 32
Third Round	Sunday 20 October 2013	16	32 → 16
Fourth round	Sunday 24 November 2013	8	16 → 8
Quarter-finals	Sunday 23 February 2014	4	8 → 4
Semi-finals	Sunday 13 April 2014	2	4 → 2
Final		1	2 → 1

== Format ==
The sixteen clubs who reached the fourth round of the 2012–13 competition receive a bye to the third round of this season's tournament. The remaining twenty eight clubs enter the first round and are initially divided into three regional groups to reduce travelling. The tournament becomes an all-in national competition from the third round onwards.

== First round ==
The draw for the first and second rounds took place in July 2013.

=== Central Group ===
One tie was drawn in this group with the following clubs receiving a bye to the second round:

- Alloa Athletic
- Arbroath
- Clyde
- Dumbarton
- Dundee
- East Fife
- Forfar Athletic
- Greenock Morton
- Heart of Midlothian
- Motherwell
- Queen's Park
- Raith Rovers
- St Johnstone
- Spartans
- Stenhousemuir
- Stirling Albion

Home team	Score	Away team
Airdrieonians	3 – 3 (a.e.t.) (2 – 4 pens)	Edinburgh City

=== North Group ===
No first round ties were drawn in this group with all the following clubs receiving byes to the second round.

- Clachnacuddin
- Cove Rangers
- Formartine United
- Fraserburgh
- Keith
- Lossiemouth
- Ross County

=== South Group ===
No first round ties were drawn in this group with all the following clubs receiving byes to the second round.

- Annan Athletic
- Hawick Royal Albert
- Queen of the South

== Second round ==
=== Central Group ===
The following clubs received byes to the third round.

- Dumbarton
- Greenock Morton
- St Johnstone

Home team	Score	Away team
Heart of Midlothian	6 – 1	Spartans
Stirling Albion	2 – 1	Alloa Athletic
Queen's Park	1 – 0	Forfar Athletic
Stenhousemuir	1 – 0	Dundee
Motherwell	3 – 0	East Fife
Raith Rovers	4 - 2	Clyde
Edinburgh City	1 – 3	Arbroath

=== North Group ===
Formartine United received a bye to the third round.

Home team	Score	Away team
Lossiemouth	0 – 1	Fraserburgh
Ross County	2 – 1	Clachnacuddin
Cove Rangers	6 – 1	Keith

=== South Group ===
Queen of the South received a bye to the third round.

Home team	Score	Away team
Hawick Royal Albert	2 – 7	Annan Athletic

== Third round ==
The following sixteen clubs entered at this stage by virtue of having reached the fourth round of last season's competition:

- Aberdeen
- Ayr United
- Celtic
- Cowdenbeath
- Dundee United
- Dunfermline Athletic
- Falkirk
- Hamilton Academical
- Hibernian
- Inverness Caledonian Thistle
- Kilmarnock
- Livingston
- Montrose
- Partick Thistle
- Rangers
- St Mirren

The third round draw was announced on 24 September 2013.

Home team	Score	Away team
St Johnstone	3 – 0	Stirling Albion
Queen of the South	4 – 1	Annan Athletic
Cove Rangers	1 – 3	Cowdenbeath
Queen's Park	2 – 2 (a.e.t.) (4 – 1 pens)	Inverness Caledonian Thistle
Dunfermline Athletic	1 – 0	Dundee United
St Mirren	2 – 1	Partick Thistle
Falkirk	1 – 3	Raith Rovers
Livingston	0 – 1	Ayr United
Greenock Morton	2 – 0	Fraserburgh
Montrose	0 – 4	Motherwell
Formartine United	3 – 2	Arbroath
Kilmarnock	3 – 0	Aberdeen
Rangers	6 – 0	Dumbarton
Celtic	4 – 0	Stenhousemuir
Hamilton Academical	2 – 4	Heart of Midlothian
Hibernian	5 – 1	Ross County

== Fourth round ==
The draw for the fourth round took place in October 2013 with ties played on 24 November and 1 December 2013

Home team	Score	Away team
Rangers	5 – 1	Hibernian
Queen's Park	3 – 2 (a.e.t.)	Queen of the South
Kilmarnock	3 – 1	Motherwell
Raith Rovers	1 – 3	St Mirren
Heart of Midlothian	11 – 0	Formartine United
Greenock Morton	3 – 2	Ayr United
St Johnstone	3 – 1	Celtic
Dunfermline Athletic	3 – 1	Cowdenbeath

== Quarter-finals ==
The ties for the quarter-finals were played on 23 February and 2 March 2014.

Home team	Score	Away team
Hearts	3 – 0	Queen's Park
Rangers	2 – 0	Dunfermline Athletic
Kilmarnock	2 – 1	Morton
St Johnstone	0 – 1	St Mirren

== Semi-finals ==
The ties for the semi-finals were played on 12 and 13 April 2014.

Home team	Score	Away team
Hearts	3 – 0	Kilmarnock
St Mirren	0 – 1 (a.e.t.)	Rangers

== Final ==
13 May 2014

Rangers	2 – 2	Heart of Midlothian
Greg Pascazio; Craig Halkett	BBC Sport	Sam Nicholson; Billy King
Penalties
	8 – 7

St Mirren Park, Paisley
