= Combined Reserve Football League =

Scottish football league

The Combined Reserve Football League was formed in 1958 as a reserve football league for the Scottish Football League Second Division sides that were excluded from the Scottish Reserve Football League. The original five clubs were Albion Rovers 'A', Dumbarton 'A', Morton 'A', Queen's Park Strollers plus Celtic's third eleven. Because of the small number of clubs involved, the league was normally played over an autumn and spring series. Another aspect of the league's membership was the frequent inclusion of non-league clubs.

Although the league disbanded in 1972, its name was resurrected by the Scottish League for its minor reserve sides.

== Champions ==
- 1958–1959 (Autumn) Dumbarton 'A' (Spring)
- 1959–1960 (Autumn) Queen of the South 'A' (Spring) East Dundee United 'A' West Queen of the South 'A'
- 1960–1961 Celtic 'B'
- 1961–1962 (Autumn) Clyde 'A' (Spring) Celtic 'B'
- 1962–1963 (Autumn) Celtic 'B' (Spring) Celtic 'B'
- 1963–1964 (Autumn) Celtic 'B' (Spring) Celtic 'B'
- 1964–1965 (Autumn) Arbroath 'A' (Spring) Raith Rovers 'A'
- 1965–1966 (Autumn) East Fife 'A' (Spring) Celtic 'B'
- 1966–1967 (Autumn) Celtic 'B' (Spring) Queen's Park Strollers
- 1967–1968 (Autumn) Heart of Midlothian 'B' (Spring) unfinished
- 1968–1969 Motherwell 'A'
- 1969–1970 (Autumn) Rangers 'B' (Spring) unfinished
- 1970–1971 (Autumn) Partick Thistle 'A' (Spring) Partick Thistle 'A'
- 1971–1972 unfinished
- 1973–1974 unfinished
- 1975–1976 Partick Thistle 'A'

== Member Clubs ==
Although the league's membership was predominantly reserve sides, a number of non-league clubs were involved at various stages. Clydebank were involved in their first season and gained election to the Scottish Football League in 1966.

- Clydebank 1965–1966
- Drumchapel Amateurs 1971–1972
- Glasgow Corporation Transport 1967–1971
- Glasgow University 1966–1972
- Jordanhill Technical College 1964–1972
- Stirling University 1971–1972

== See also ==
- Scottish Football (Defunct Leagues)
