= 2011–12 Scottish Youth Cup =

2011–12 Scottish FA Youth Cup
SFA Youth Cup

Tournament details
- Country: Scotland
- Teams: 53

Final positions
- Champions: Celtic
- Runners-up: Queen of the South

The 2011–12 Scottish Youth Cup was the 29th season of the Scottish Youth Cup, Scotland's national cup tournament at under-19 age level. The competition is administered by the Scottish Football Association and is open to all Senior clubs.

Celtic won the tournament for a third successive season after defeating Queen of the South by a record 8–0 margin in the final.

== Calendar ==
The ties for the 2011–12 competition are scheduled as below:

Round	Match date	Fixtures	Clubs
First Round	Sunday 11 September 2011	5	53 → 48
Second Round	Sunday 9 October 2011	16	48 → 32
Third Round	Sunday 13 November 2011	16	32 → 16
Fourth Round	Sunday 11 December 2011	8	16 → 8
Quarter-finals	Sunday 12 February 2012	4	8 → 4
Semi-finals	Sunday 25 March 2012	2	4 → 2
Final	Monday 23 April 2012	1	2 → 1

== Format ==
- First Round - 37 teams are divided by geographical area. 21 teams go into the Central Group, 10 into the North Group and 6 into the South Group.
  The required number of ties are drawn to reduce the number of teams in the Second Round to 32. The rest of teams receive byes into the Second Round.
- Second Round - 5 winners from the First Round join 27 teams, who received byes in the previous round.
- Third Round - 16 winners from the Second Round join the 16 seeded teams, who enter at this stage by virtue of having reached the Fourth Round of last years competition.
- Fourth Round - 16 winners from the Third Round.
- Quarter-finals - 8 winners from the Fourth Round.
- Semi-finals - 4 winners of the Quarter-finals.
- Final - 2 winners of the Semi-finals.

== Fixtures & Results ==
The draws for the First and Second Rounds were conducted on 22 July 2011.

=== First round ===
==== Central Group ====
Alloa Athletic, Berwick Rangers, Brechin City, Cowdenbeath, Dundee, Dundee United, East Fife, East Stirlingshire, Edinburgh City, Forfar Athletic, Greenock Morton, Motherwell, Queen's Park, St Johnstone and Stirling Albion receive byes into the Second Round.

Home team	Score	Away team
Partick Thistle	1 – 2	Dunfermline Athletic
Spartans	4 – 3	Dumbarton
Arbroath	8 – 0	Civil Service Strollers

Source: http://news.bbc.co.uk/sport2/hi/football/scot_cups/default.stm

==== North Group ====
Clachnacuddin, Cove Rangers, Fort William, Fraserburgh, Peterhead and Ross County receive byes into the Second Round.

Home team	Score	Away team
Huntly	1 – 11	Inverness Caledonian Thistle
Keith	5 – 1	Inverurie Loco Works

Source: http://news.bbc.co.uk/sport2/hi/football/scot_cups/default.stm

==== South Group ====
No First Round ties were drawn in this group.
Annan Athletic, Gala Fairydean, Kilmarnock, Queen of the South, St Cuthbert Wanderers and Stranraer receive byes into the Second Round.

=== Second round ===
==== Central Group ====
Home team	Score	Away team
Dundee United	2 – 0	Edinburgh City
St Johnstone	6 – 0	Spartans
Dunfermline Athletic	7 – 1	East Stirlingshire
Motherwell	1 – 0	Arbroath
Greenock Morton	4 – 1	Forfar Athletic
Queen's Park	0 – 3	East Fife
Brechin City	4 – 1	Dundee
Alloa Athletic	1 – 2	Berwick Rangers
Cowdenbeath	1 – 3	Stirling Albion

Source: http://news.bbc.co.uk/sport2/hi/football/scot_cups/default.stm

==== North Group ====
Home team	Score	Away team
Inverness Caledonian Thistle	3 – 1	Keith
Fraserburgh	0 – 3	Peterhead
Cove Rangers	3 – 2 (a.e.t.)	Ross County
Fort William	6 – 0	Clachnacuddin

Source: http://news.bbc.co.uk/sport2/hi/football/scot_cups/default.stm

==== South Group ====
Home team	Score	Away team
Gala Fairydean	1 – 0	Stranraer
Queen of the South	7 – 1	St Cuthbert Wanderers
Annan Athletic	1 – 7	Kilmarnock

Source: http://news.bbc.co.uk/sport2/hi/football/scot_cups/default.stm

=== Third round ===
Seeded clubs for the Third Round are Aberdeen, Airdrie United, Ayr United, Celtic, Clyde, Coldstream, Falkirk, Hamilton Academical, Heart of Midlothian, Hibernian, Livingston, Montrose, Raith Rovers, Rangers, St Mirren and Stenhousemuir.

The Third Round draw was made by Stewart Regan on 18 October 2011.

Home team	Score	Away team
Stenhousemuir	3 – 2 (a.e.t.)	Raith Rovers
Inverness Caledonian Thistle	2 – 0 (a.e.t.)	East Fife
Dunfermline Athletic	4 – 2	St Johnstone
Livingston	5 – 1	Peterhead
Fort William	0 – 2	Falkirk
Berwick Rangers	2 – 3	Queen of the South
Celtic	5 – 0	Kilmarnock
Brechin City	1 – 3	Ayr United
St Mirren	5 – 0	Stirling Albion
Greenock Morton	5 – 1	Clyde
Rangers	1 – 3 (a.e.t.)	Dundee United
Gala Fairydean	0 – 14	Aberdeen
Cove Rangers	1 – 2	Montrose
Hibernian	2 – 1 (a.e.t.)	Heart of Midlothian
Coldstream	1 – 1 (a.e.t.) (1 – 3 pens)	Airdrie United
Motherwell	2 – 3	Hamilton Academical

=== Fourth round ===
The Fourth round draw was conducted on 16 November 2011.

Home team	Score	Away team
Aberdeen	4 – 2	Hamilton Academical
St Mirren	3 – 0	Hibernian
Livingston	6 – 1	Airdrie United
Ayr United	4 – 2	Inverness Caledonian Thistle
Montrose	0 – 4	Stenhousemuir
Falkirk	1 – 2 (a.e.t.)	Dundee United
Celtic	5 - 0	Dunfermline Athletic
Greenock Morton	2 – 3 (a.e.t.)	Queen of the South

=== Quarter-finals ===
The draw for the Quarter-finals was made on 12 December 2011.

Home team	Score	Away team
Livingston	2 – 4	Dundee United
St Mirren	2 – 1	Stenhousemuir
Queen of the South	2 – 1	Ayr United
Aberdeen	1 – 4	Celtic

=== Semi-finals ===
The draw for the Semi-finals took place at Hampden Park on 15 February 2012.

1 April 2012
13:00

St Mirren	1 – 4	Celtic
Jack Smith 22'	Celtic FC	36', 42' Tony Watt; 73' John Herron; 86' Filip Twardzik

St Mirren Park, Paisley
Referee: Craig Napier

17 April 2012
19:30

Dundee United	4 – 5 (a.e.t.)	Queen of the South
Ryan Gauld 8', 31'; Robert Thomson 51', 68'	DUFC	21', 82' Patrick Slattery; 49' Lewis Todd; 85' (pen.) Scott Hooper; 104' Gavin Reilly

Tannadice Park, Dundee
Referee: Ross McIntyre

=== Final ===
23 April 2012
19:30

Celtic	8 – 0	Queen of the South
Filip Twardzik 1'; Jackson Irvine 27'; Dylan McGeouch 42', 68'; Callum McGregor 43' (pen.), 73', 85' (pen.); John Herron 67'	Report

Hampden Park, Glasgow
Attendance: 3,707
Referee: Brian Colvin
