= Thomas Flynn (English footballer) =

English footballer (born 1990)

Personal information
- Full name: Thomas Flynn
- Date of birth: 23 November 1990 (age 35)
- Place of birth: Newcastle, England
- Position: Goalkeeper

Team information
- Current team: Whitley Bay
- Number: 1

Youth career
- Newcastle United
- 2007–2009: Hibernian

Senior career*
Years	Team	Apps	(Gls)
2009–2011	Hibernian	0	(0)
2010	→ Alloa Athletic (loan)	0	(0)
2010	→ Alloa Athletic (loan)	0	(0)
2011	→ Albion Rovers (loan)	10	(0)
2011–2014	Cowdenbeath	85	(0)
2015–	Alfreton Town	0	(0)
- * Club domestic league appearances and goals as of 00:09, 18 February 2015 (UTC)

Thomas Flynn (born 23 November 1990) is the English footballer, who plays for Whitley Bay.

== Career ==
Flynn began his footballing career at Newcastle United's Academy, signing with Hibernian in 2007 summer. After progressing through the club's youth setup, he was one of seven players from the club's under-19 side to be given a full-time contract in 2009. Flynn was then loaned to Alloa Athletic in February 2010. At the end of the season, he returned to Hibernian.

On 13 August 2010, Flynn rejoined Alloa on loan, after first-choice goalkeeper Jamie Ewings suffered an injury. In January 2011, he was loaned to Albion Rovers. He was released by Hibs on 29 April.

On 3 July 2011, Flynn signed a one-year deal with Cowdenbeath. A year later, after having 14 clean sheets in 30 matches, he renewed his link with The Blue Brazil. On 11 August 2012, Flynn made his Scottish Championship debut, in a 0–4 home defeat against Dunfermline. He left Cowdenbeath in October 2014.

In January 2015, Flynn signed for Football Conference side Alfreton Town.
