= Heart of Midlothian F.C. Reserves and Academy =

Heart of Midlothian
- Full name: Heart of Midlothian Football Club Development Squad
- Nicknames: The Maroons (earliest nickname); Hearts; The Jam Tarts; Jambos; The Famous; The Wee Jambos (youth team nickname)
- Founded: 1874; 152 years ago
- Ground: Ferguson Park, Rosewell; Oriam, Riccarton, Ainslie Park home of The Spartans.
- League: Lowland Football League
Home colours	Away colours	Third colours

In addition to the Heart of Midlothian F.C. first team competing in the Scottish Premiership, the club also maintains a side in the Lowland Football League and various youth teams in their Academy setup. They are often affectionately nicknamed "The Wee Jambos".

== Reserve team ==
Hearts Reserves are the reserve team of Heart of Midlothian.

Hearts were members of the Scottish Premier Reserve League from its foundation in the 1998–99 season. The league started as an U21 League but reverted to an open age group league in season 2004–05. The Reserve League was abandoned for season 2009–10 due to financial constraints and a lack of support from other clubs. Hearts Reserves formerly played their home games at Forthbank Stadium (the home of Stirling Albion). The team mainly consisted of Under-19 players and those on the fringe of the first team squad. Some of the first team also played when recovering from injury. The Reserves' head coach in that was Gary Locke.

In July 2018, it was reported that reserve leagues would be reintroduced in lieu of the development leagues that had been in place since 2009. The top tier of the new SPFL Reserve League featured 18 clubs, whilst a second-tier reserve League comprised nine clubs. Other than a minimum age of 16, no age restrictions applied to the leagues. At the end of its first season (2018–19) several clubs intimated that they would withdraw from the Reserve League to play a variety of challenge matches, but Hearts were one of those who chose to remain.

== Under-20 Team & development squad ==
The Heart of Midlothian Under-20 Team competes in the SPFL Development League previously the Scottish Premier Under 20s League.

In 2017, the Hearts academy was one of eight across the country designated 'elite' status on the introduction of Project Brave, an SFA initiative to concentrate the development of the best young players at a smaller number of clubs with high quality facilities and coaching than was previously the case.

The under-20s play their home matches at Ochilview Park, Stenhousemuir whilst training at Riccarton (Heriot-Watt University).

=== U20 development squad ===
Note: Flags indicate national team as defined under FIFA eligibility rules; some limited exceptions apply. Players may hold more than one non-FIFA nationality.

No.	Pos.	Nation	Player
36	FW	SCO	Callum Sandilands
38	MF	SCO	Gus Stevenson
39	DF	SCO	Matthew Gillies
42	DF	SCO	Euan Glasgow
43	MF	SCO	Charlie Sanders
44	FW	SCO	Jayden Mathie
45	FW	SCO	Connor Dow
47	DF	NIR	Alfie Wilson
48	MF	SCO	Stanley Wilson
49	MF	SCO	Liam Walker
50	GK	SCO	Jack Lyon
51	FW	SCO	Sam Dickov
53	MF	SCO	Cameron Clark

No.	Pos.	Nation	Player
54	DF	SCO	Peter Kellock
55	DF	SCO	Robbie Flockhart
56	FW	SCO	Sinan Kaharevic
57	GK	SCO	Aidan Duncan
—	GK	SCO	Finlay Jamieson
—	DF	SCO	Allan Clark
—	DF	SCO	Carson McGauley
—	MF	SCO	Harry Willox
—	FW	SCO	Ruaridh Cameron
—	FW	ENG	Jaedon Donkor
—	FW	SCO	Tommy North

== Honours ==
=== Reserves ===
- Scottish Reserve League (1955–1975)
  - Champions: 1958
  - Runners-up: 1957, 1971, 1972, 1975
- Premier Reserve League(1975–1998)
  - Champions: 1993, 1997
  - Runners-up: 1996
- Scottish Premier Reserve League (1998–2009)
  - Champions: 1999–00
  - Runners-up: 2003–04, 2008–09
- SPFL Reserve League (2018–)
  - Runners-up: 2019–20
- SPFL Reserve Cup
  - Winners: 2018–19

=== Youths ===
- Scottish Youth Cup
  - Winners (3): 1993, 1998, 2000
  - Runners-up (3): 2006, 2014, 2016
- SPL U-19/SPFL Development League
  - Winners: 2001
  - Runners-up (3): 2008–09, 2010–11, 2011–12

== Former youth team players ==
- (Scotland) Gary Naysmith
- (Scotland) Scott Severin
- (Scotland) Stephen Simmons
- (Scotland) Robbie Neilson
- (Scotland) Craig Gordon
- (Scotland) Christophe Berra
- (Scotland) Andrew Driver
- (Scotland) Calum Elliot
- (Scotland) Lee Wallace
- (Scotland) Jamie MacDonald
- (Scotland) David Gray
- (Iceland) Eggert Jonsson
- (Australia) Ryan McGowan
- (Scotland) David Templeton
- (Scotland) Gary Glen
- (Lithuania) Arvydas Novikovas
- (England) Conrad Balatoni
- (Australia) Dylan McGowan
- (Scotland) Scott Robinson
- (Ukraine) Denis Prychynenko
- (Scotland) Jamie Walker
- (Scotland) Jason Holt
- (Scotland) David Smith
- (Scotland) Callum Tapping
- (Scotland) Kevin McHattie
- (Scotland) Fraser Mullen
- (Scotland) Brad McKay
- (Scotland) Billy King
- (Scotland) Callum Paterson
- (Scotland) Jack Hamilton
- (Scotland) Dale Carrick
- (Scotland) Sam Nicholson
- (Scotland) Jason Cummings
- (Scotland) Gary Oliver
- (Scotland) Adam King
- (Scotland) Jordan McGhee
- (Scotland) Euan Henderson
- (Scotland) Harry Cochrane
- (Scotland) Chris Hamilton
- (Scotland) Cammy Logan
- (Scotland) Connor Smith
- (Scotland) Aaron Hickey
- (Scotland) Josh Doig
- (Scotland) Aidan Denholm
