= Celtic F.C. B Team and Academy =

Celtic B
- Full name: Celtic B
- Nicknames: The Bhoys; The Celts; The Hoops
- Founded: 1888
- Ground: Excelsior Stadium, Airdrie
- Capacity: 10,101
- Coordinates: 55.860136°N 3.959922°W
- Coach: Stephen McManus
- League: Lowland League West
Home colours	Away colours	Third colours

Celtic B are the reserve team of Celtic Football Club. They play home games in Airdrie and compete in the Lowland League. Celtic have run a reserve side since the early days of the club, comprising a combination of emerging youth players and first-team squad players. The current "B" side forms the highest level of the academy structure at Celtic, beneath which there are four junior strands: Professional Academy (Under 18s), Intermediate Academy (Under 13s, 14s, 15s & 16s), Junior Academy (Under 10s, 11s & 12s) and Development Centres (five years old and above).

== History of reserve and youth football ==
=== Reserve football ===
Celtic ran a reserve side from their early days, known at the time as the Crusaders. Other clubs in the 1880s also gave their reserve sides distinctive names, with Rangers calling their Second XI the Swifts, and Queens Park naming their reserves the Strollers.

Celtic's first known involvement in reserve league football, was their participation in the Scottish Combination league in 1896. Several Scottish League clubs fielded 2nd XIs ('A' sides), as well as Queens Park Strollers. However, by the 1900s Celtic manager Willie Maley was only using a small, if versatile, squad of players, and the decision was made to stop fielding a reserve team altogether. In 1909, a new Scottish Reserve League was set up, again often including at least one non-reserve side of a non-league club in each of its seasons. Celtic did not participate. The league was disbanded during World War I, but effectively re-established in 1919 as the Scottish Alliance League. As with previous incarnations, this reserve league also contained the first XI of several non-league sides. Celtic took part for the first few seasons, and won the championship in 1921–22, however withdrew again after that for what is presumed were financial reasons. This appeared an unwise decision. Rangers went on to dominate Scottish football in the 1920s, and Celtic appeared to struggle without a reserve team to help blend younger players into the club's first team.

The club did re-introduce a reserve team in 1930, and won three Alliance championships in 1934, 1937 and 1938, and the Second XI Cup in 1935 and 1936. Malky MacDonald, Johnny Crum, George Paterson, Jimmy Delaney, John Divers and Willie Buchan all emerged during this time from the reserve side and went on to form the nucleus of the Celtic first team that won the league championship in 1936 and 1938, and the Scottish Cup in 1937. In 1936, Celtic fielded trialist Mohammed Salim in two Alliance league matches, with him becoming the first footballer from the Indian sub-continent to play for a European club. A league AGM in 1938, resulted in the non-league sides being removed and the league became exclusive to First Division reserve sides. The advent of World War II, however, once again saw the suspension of national reserve league football in Scotland, although regional leagues were set up.

The national Reserve League restarted at the end of the war, once again mirroring the sixteen club top-tier division. The subsequent years into the 1950s saw various changes to the leagues, but Celtic's achievements at reserve level were undistinguished, with two fourth-place finishes in 1952 and 1954 their highest positions. The Scottish (Reserve) League was set up in 1955, again mirroring the First Division although there were a number of seasons when not all of those clubs took part. This set-up, with minor variations, continued up until 1975. Jock Stein's appointment in 1957 as reserve team coach saw an upturn in Celtic's commitment to reserve team football. Future star players such as Paddy Crerand, Billy McNeill, John Clark and Bertie Auld all emerged at Celtic during this time. The reserves won the Second XI Cup in 1958 (thrashing Rangers 8–2 on aggregate) and the reserve league title a year later. From 1958 up to 1966, Celtic also fielded a reserve side (effectively a 3rd XI) in the Combined Reserve League. Although Stein left in 1960 to manage Dunfermline Athletic, promising players continued to emerge from the reserves, such as Bobby Murdoch, Jimmy Johnstone and George Connelly.

The mid-1960s saw the emergence of one of Celtic's most notable reserve sides, a group that became known as the Quality Street Kids. Several became regulars in the first-team side, winning major honours and going on to represent Scotland at full international level, most notably Kenny Dalglish and Danny McGrain. In August 1968, the reserves needed to defeat Partick Thistle by at least seven goals to win their Reserve League Cup group section; Celtic won 12–0, with Lou Macari scoring four goals. That same year, the Celtic reserves played the Scotland national football team in a practice match; the young Celtic won 5–2. During season 1970–71, Celtic won all three main reserve honours - league, Reserve League Cup and Second XI Cup - scoring 157 goals in the process and becoming the first reserve team in Scotland to win the treble.

In 1975, the Scottish League was reorganized into Premier-First-Second. The Premier clubs were assigned to the Premier Reserve League and the lower league clubs used varying regionalised sections and midweek competitions. Key players continued to emerge from the youths and reserves; Roy Aitken, Tommy Burns and George McCluskey in the late 1970s, and Pat Bonner, Charlie Nicholas and Paul McStay in the 1980s. When the Scottish Premier League was founded in 1998, the reserve league was replaced by an under 21 league with some overage players permitted. Various changes to this set-up were made in subsequent years, eventually leading to the SPFL Development League which was contested by the Under-20 teams of 17 Scottish Professional Football League clubs, including Celtic, up to the end of season 2017–18. During the 2010s, James Forrest, Callum McGregor and Kieran Tierney all progressed as youths at Celtic and became established first-team players at the club. Tierney was later transferred to Arsenal for a transfer fee of £25m, a record fee for a Scottish footballer.

In July 2018, it was reported that reserve leagues would be reintroduced in lieu of the development leagues that had been in place since 2009. The top tier of the new SPFL Reserve League featured 18 clubs, whilst a second-tier reserve League comprised nine clubs. Other than a minimum age of 16, no age restrictions applied to the leagues. At the end of its first season (2018–19), Celtic – along with several other clubs – intimated that they would withdraw from the Reserve League to play a variety of challenge matches. They later entered a small league (under-21 plus three overage) along with three other Scottish clubs and Brentford and Huddersfield Town from the English leagues.

In the 2021/22 season, Celtic B (and Rangers B) began playing in the Lowland Football League (the fifth tier of the senior setup). There was a proposal to include them in an expanded Scottish League Two (fourth tier) still under consideration by the SPFL for the year after that.

==== Cup competitions ====
There were numerous cup competitions for reserve sides since the earliest days; e.g. the Edinburgh 2nd XI Cup first played in the 1870s and the Scottish 2nd XI Cup which existed from 1882 to 1988. A plethora of cups were introduced during the 1880s but the advent of professionalism a decade later put pressure on club finances, and during the 1890s these tournaments gradually fell away. The Scottish 2nd XI Cup was first competed for during season 1881–82 and was competed for each season up until 1988. The Scottish Reserve League Cup was introduced in 1945 and was last held in season 2013–14. In June 2016, it was announced that the Challenge Cup would be expanded to include Under-20 sides from each Scottish Premiership club. In the 2016-17 edition, Celtic U20 won their opening tie against Annan Athletic and then eliminated Cowdenbeath (both of the fourth level) before being knocked out by the then-League 1 club Livingston; they progressed further than all other Under-20s teams. In the 2017–18 Challenge Cup, the side were beaten by Annan Athletic in the first round.

==== International tournaments ====
Celtic's U20s were the first Scottish participants in the NextGen Series - a youth tournament based on the UEFA Champions League. In the 2011–12 season, Celtic were drawn against Barcelona, Manchester City and Marseille, and finished third in their group. Celtic confirmed that they would play in the 2012–13 edition tournament as well; the team were again eliminated in the Group Stage.

In 2013–14 Celtic's senior team qualified for the Champions League group stages, meaning that the youth squad could play in the first edition of the UEFA Youth League. In the following season there was no chance to participate in that competition due to the first team's failure to qualify, but in 2015–16 an additional route into the tournament opened up to domestic youth (Under-17) champions, and Celtic qualified as the Scottish holders of that title. After navigating two rounds, Celtic were eliminated on penalties by Valencia.

In 2016–17 the senior team succeeded in reaching the Champions League group stage, so the youth squad also entered that season's Youth League via that route (they had also qualified through the Under-17 path again in any case). In the Youth League, the Group Stage mirrored the tough draw in the senior tournament, and Celtic collected just one point and finished fourth. Qualification was the same in 2017–18 – the Under-17s won the Scottish league but in any case the first team reached the Champions League groups.

Celtic also successfully applied to compete in the 2014–15, 2015–16 and 2016–17 editions of the England-based Premier League International Cup.

=== Youth football ===
A Youth Division was set by the Scottish League in 1993 and ran until 2012. This was an Under-18 league initially, but changed to Under-19s from 2003 onwards. Celtic Youths won the league for four consecutive seasons from 2002–03 to 2005–06.

The Scottish Youth Cup was set up in 1984 and open to all senior clubs in Scotland. It was initially an U19 tournament, but is now for U20 sides. Celtic are historically the most successful club in the competition, winning 14 finals. The Glasgow Cup was for many years considered an important trophy for first-team sides in Glasgow, but by the 1980s had lost prestige and saw Celtic and Rangers usually fielding reserve sides. Due to lack of interest in the tournament as a senior competition, it was relaunched in 1989 as a youth tournament and is currently competed for by the U17 sides of senior league clubs in Glasgow.

== Celtic B ==
As of 1 October 2026

Note: squad numbers listed relate only to first team numbers. In "B" (or youth) matches, the team wear 1–11.

Note: Flags indicate national team as defined under FIFA eligibility rules; some limited exceptions apply. Players may hold more than one non-FIFA nationality.

No.	Pos.	Nation	Player
33	MF	SCO	Sean McArdle
43	FW	SCO	Samuel Isiguzo
44	DF	SCO	Cole Crawford
46	DF	SCO	Hayden Borland
48	DF	SCO	Samuel Sedwell
53	FW	SCO	Calvin Keenan
55	DF	SCO	Joshua Mulgrew
57	MF	SCO	Kayden Daly
58	MF	SCO	Conor Daly
59	FW	SCO	Emmanuel Obidiwe
60	DF	SCO	Michael Charlton
61	DF	SCO	Joseph Haney
64	MF	SCO	Nathan Meechan
65	FW	SCO	Lucas Clearie
66	DF	SCO	Hassan Dembele

No.	Pos.	Nation	Player
67	DF	SCO	Aodhan Taylor
69	MF	SCO	Rocco Di Giacomo
73	GK	SCO	Corey Shaw
74	GK	SCO	Cameron Patterson
81	DF	SCO	Robbie Heron
82	FW	SCO	Ezekiel Molife
84	MF	SCO	Jack Thomson
—	GK	SCO	Warren Lyall
—	DF	SCO	Jacob Cameron
—	DF	SCO	Isaac English
—	DF	SCO	Finlay Hale
—	DF	NIR	Shea McGarry
—	MF	SCO	Cayden Anderson
—	MF	SCO	Mark Harris
—	FW	SCO	Lennon Watt

=== Out on loan ===
Note: Flags indicate national team as defined under FIFA eligibility rules; some limited exceptions apply. Players may hold more than one non-FIFA nationality.

No.	Pos.	Nation	Player
39	FW	SCO	Thomas Hatton (on loan at Ayr United)
40	FW	SCO	Rhys Dargie (co-operation loan with East Kilbride)
45	MF	SCO	Owen Hartington (co-operation loan with Dumbarton)
54	MF	NIR	Francis Turley (on loan at Dumbarton)
62	MF	SCO	Liam Kennedy (co-operation loan with East Kilbride)

No.	Pos.	Nation	Player
71	GK	SCO	Aidan Rice (co-operation loan with Dumbarton)
72	GK	IRL	Marcus Gill (co-operation loan with East Kilbride)
—	MF	SCO	Jude Bonnar (on loan at Arbroath)
—	MF	SCO	Kyle Ure (on loan at Crewe Alexandra)

== Academy ==
The Celtic Youth Academy works with players from as young as five years of age, concentrating in early years on improving players technique, passing and possession. Players are actively encouraged to demonstrate their skills, including tricks and flicks, in match situations. The academy also works in partnership with St Ninian's High School in Kirkintilloch, where players of secondary-school age benefit from nine coaching sessions per week.

The most promising players then progress to Celtic's Development Squad programme.

In 2017, the Celtic academy was one of eight across the country designated 'elite' status on the introduction of Project Brave, an SFA initiative to concentrate the development of the best young players at a smaller number of clubs with high quality facilities and coaching than was previously the case.

The youth academy currently comprises four levels: Professional Academy (Under 18s), Intermediate Academy (Under 13s, 14s, 15s & 16s), Junior Academy (Under 10s, 11s & 12s) and Development Centres (five years old and above).

On 23 November 2023, Celtic Soccer Academy announced that a partnership with Get Gung Ho FC from Singapore, providing the support of the soccer academy to help develop their players, coaches and programmes over the next three years.

== Facilities ==
Since 2007, the club's academy and reserve sides have trained at the Lennoxtown Training Centre. In 2019, Celtic announced plans to redevelop their older Barrowfield training ground in eastern Glasgow near Celtic Park for use by the academy sides and their women's team, including an indoor pitch and a matchday venue, augmenting the Lennoxtown base which would continue to be used by the first team squad.

In July 2021, it was announced that the men's B-team (as well as the women's team) would play the majority of their home fixtures in 2021–22 at Airdrie's Penny Cars Stadium.

== Staff ==
Position	Name
Head of youth academy	Chris McCart
Head of academy coaching	Steven Hammell
Professional player pathway manager	Shaun Maloney
Academy operations manager	Brian Meehan
B team head coach	Stephen McManus
B team coach	Jonny Hayes
U18 coach	Chris Henry
Head of academy goalkeeping	Colin Meldrum
Intermediate goalkeeping coach	Robbie Thomson
Junior academy goalkeeping coach	Tom McKay
Intermediate academy coaches	Miodrag Krivokapić; Tom McCafferty; Tony McGrory; Mark McNally; John McStay; Michael O'Halloran
Junior academy coaches	Stevie Chalmers; Mark Farrell; Chris Hynes; Michael McCahill; Scott Murray; Aiden Robertson; Jose Romero; Zeshan Ullah
Head of youth recruitment	Willie McStay
Head of children's programmes	Willie McNab

== Honours ==
=== Reserves ===
League

- Scottish Reserve League: 9

1895–96, 1958–59, 1959–60, 1960–61, 1962–63, 1964–65, 1965–66, 1969–70, 1970–71

- Premier Reserve League: 5

1979–80, 1984–85, 1990–91, 1993–94, 1994–95

- SPL Reserve League: 5

2004–05, 2005–06, 2006–07, 2007–08, 2008–09

- Scottish Alliance: 4

1921–22, 1933–34, 1936–37, 1937–38

Cup

- Scottish 2nd FA XI Cup: 8

1890–91, 1934–35, 1935–36, 1957–58, 1965–66, 1970–71, 1973–74, 1984–85

- Reserve League Cup: 13

1959–60, 1966–67, 1968–69, 1969–70, 1970–71, 1979–80, 1980–81, 1985–86, 1989–90, 1991–92, 1993–94, 1994–95, 1995–96

Other

- Kilsyth Charity Cup: 1

1889

- Jock Stein Friendship Cup: 9

2006, 2007, 2008, 2009, 2010, 2016, 2017, 2018, 2019

- John Reames Trophy: 1

2010

- GFR Challenge Cup: 1

2019

Third XI / B Team

- Combined Reserve League: 3

1960–61, 1962 –63, 1963–64

- CRL Autumn Series: 1

1963–64

- CRL Spring Series: 4

1959–60 (West), 1961–62, 1962–63, 1965–66

=== Youths ===
Domestic

- SFL/SPL Youth League: 9

1995, 2000, 2003, 2004, 2005, 2006, 2010, 2011, 2012

- SPFL U20 League: 3

2013, 2014, 2016

- SPFL U19 League: 1

2013 (Note: In 2013–14 an under-19 league was run along with an under-20 league. Celtic promoted its under-17 team to as play as its under-19 team in 2013.)

- SPFL/CAS U17 League:

2015, 2016, 2017

- Scottish Youth Cup: 15

1984, 1987, 1989, 1996, 1997, 1999, 2003, 2005, 2006, 2010, 2011, 2012, 2013, 2015, 2017

- SPFL U19 League Cup: 1

2014 (Note: In 2013–14 the under-19 league ran from August to December 2013. The under-19 league cup ran from January to May 2014.)

- Glasgow Cup: 11 (Youth competition since 1990)

1990, 1991, 1997, 1998, 2008, 2011, 2014, 2015, 2016, 2017, 2019

International

- Blues Stars / FIFA Youth Cup: 1

1986

- HKFC International Soccer Sevens: 1

2009

- Super Cup NI (U19): 1

2018

== Former youth team players ==
Players in Bold have senior international caps

- (Scotland) **Roy Aitken**
- (Scotland) Marc Anthony
- (Scotland) Gary Arbuckle
- (Scotland) Owen Archdeacon
- (Bosnia and Herzegovina) Bahrudin Atajić
- (Scotland) **Barry Bannan**
- (Scotland) **Craig Beattie**
- (Iceland) **Teddy Bjarnason**
- (Scotland) Jimmy Boyle
- (Scotland) Gerry Britton
- (Scotland) **Mark Burchill**
- (Scotland) **Tommy Burns**
- (Scotland) **Paul Caddis**
- (Republic of Ireland) Graham Carey
- (Scotland) Jim Casey
- (United States) Dominic Cervi
- (Scotland) Joe Chalmers
- (Scotland) Paul Chalmers
- (Scotland) Marc Cocozza
- (Scotland) Ryan Conroy
- (Scotland) Barry John Corr
- (Scotland) Ronnie Coyle
- (Scotland) **Stephen Crainey**
- (Scotland) Danny Crainie
- (Scotland) Gerry Creaney
- (Scotland) Scott Cuthbert
- (England) Karamoko Dembélé
- (Scotland) **Simon Donnelly**
- (Scotland) Colby Donovan
- (Scotland) Ross Doohan
- (Republic of Ireland) **Michael Doyle**
- (Scotland) Michael Doyle
- (England) Barry Elliot
- (Scotland) David Elliot
- (Scotland) Simon Ferry
- (Scotland) Islam Feruz
- (Scotland) **Stuart Findlay**
- (Iceland) **Kjartan Finnbogason**
- (England) Darnell Fisher
- (Scotland) Sean Fitzharris
- (Scotland) **James Forrest**
- (Scotland) Mark Fotheringham
- (Scotland) Scott Fox
- (Scotland) Marcus Fraser
- (Scotland) Steve Fulton
- (Scotland) **Declan Gallagher**
- (Scotland) Tony Gallagher
- (Scotland) Michael Gardyne
- (Republic of Ireland) Paul George
- (Republic of Ireland) **Jim Goodwin**
- (Scotland) Liam Gormley
- (Scotland) **Peter Grant**
- (Scotland) Ross Harris
- (Scotland) Chris Hay
- (Northern Ireland) **Conor Hazard**
- (Republic of Ireland) **Colin Healy**
- (Scotland) Ewan Henderson
- (Scotland) Liam Henderson
- (Scotland) **Jack Hendry**
- (Scotland) John Herron
- (Scotland) **Gary Holt**
- (Scotland) Gary Irvine
- (Australia) **Jackson Irvine**
- (Republic of Ireland) **Mikey Johnston**
- (Scotland) Denny Johnstone
- (Scotland) James Keatings
- (Scotland) **John Kennedy**
- (Scotland) Liam Keogh
- (Scotland) Stewart Kerr
- (Republic of Ireland) Johnny Kenny
- (Scotland) Lewis Kidd
- (Latvia) **Antons Kurakins**
- (Northern Ireland) **Daniel Lafferty**
- (Scotland) Paul Lawson
- (Canada) Jacob Lensky
- (Scotland) Jamie Lindsay
- (Scotland) Simon Lynch
- (Scotland) **Shaun Maloney**
- (Scotland) **David Marshall**
- (Scotland) Jason Marr
- (Scotland) Alex Mathie
- (Scotland) John Paul McBride
- (Scotland) Kevin McBride
- (Scotland) Ryan McCann
- (Scotland) Dugald McCarrison
- (Scotland) Jamie McCart
- (Scotland) George McCluskey
- (Scotland) Brian McColligan
- (Republic of Ireland) **Aiden McGeady**
- (Scotland) **Dylan McGeouch**
- (Scotland) Mark McGeown
- (New Zealand) **Michael McGlinchey**
- (Scotland) Jon-Paul McGovern
- (Northern Ireland) **Michael McGovern**
- (Scotland) Paul McGowan
- (Scotland) **Callum McGregor**
- (Scotland) **Jim McInally**
- (Scotland) Kerr McInroy
- (Scotland) Des McKeown
- (Scotland) Brian McLaughlin
- (Scotland) **Stephen McManus**
- (Scotland) Mark McNally
- (Scotland) Anthony McParland
- (Scotland) Jamie McQuilken
- (Scotland) **Paul McStay**
- (Scotland) Willie McStay
- (Scotland) Chris Millar
- (Scotland) Mark Millar
- (Scotland) Calvin Miller
- (Republic of Ireland) **Liam Miller**
- (Czech Republic) Milan Mišůn
- (Scotland) Adam Montgomery
- (Scotland) Allan Morrison
- (Scotland) David Moyes
- (Scotland) **Charlie Mulgrew**
- (Scotland) Aidan Nesbitt
- (Scotland) **Pat Nevin**
- (Scotland) **Charlie Nicholas**
- (Scotland) Jim O'Brien
- (Republic of Ireland) Diarmuid O'Carroll
- (Republic of Ireland) Eoghan O'Connell
- (Republic of Ireland) **Darren O'Dea**
- (Scotland) **Stephen O'Donnell**
- (Republic of Ireland) Armstrong Oko-Flex
- (Scotland) **Brian O'Neil**
- (Bulgaria) Tomislav Pavlov
- (Scotland) John Potter
- (Scotland) Bryan Prunty
- (Republic of Ireland) Ben Quinn
- (Scotland) Rocco Quinn
- (Scotland) **Anthony Ralston**
- (Scotland) Craig Reid
- (Scotland) Mark Reid
- (Scotland) Nicky Riley
- (Scotland) Andy Ritchie
- (Italy) Luca Santonocito
- (Scotland) Tony Shepherd
- (Republic of Ireland) **Cillian Sheridan**
- (Scotland) Paul Slane
- (Scotland) Barry Smith
- (Scotland) **Jamie Smith**
- (Scotland) Greig Spence
- (Scotland) Mark Staunton
- (Scotland) Joe Thomson
- (Scotland) Robbie Thomson
- (Scotland) **Kieran Tierney**
- (Scotland) Lewis Toshney
- (Republic of Ireland) Richie Towell
- (Scotland) Andrew Traub
- (Scotland) John Traynor
- (Czech Republic) Filip Twardzik
- (Czech Republic) Patrik Twardzik
- (Scotland) **Ross Wallace**
- (Scotland) Sam Wardrop
- (Scotland) Calum Waters
- (Scotland) **Tony Watt**
- (Scotland) Stephen Welsh
- (Scotland) **Derek Whyte**
- (Republic of Ireland) David van Zanten
- (Republic of Ireland) **Rocco Vata**
- (Scotland) Mo Yaqub
