= Scottish Youth Cup =

Football tournament in Scotland

The Scottish Youth Cup (also known as the SFA Youth Cup) is an annual Scottish football competition run by the Scottish Football Association for under-18 teams, previously under-19 teams. The competition started in 1983–84 and is open to all clubs in full membership of SFA.

The competition's first winners, Celtic, have won the competition 16 times, more than any other club. Heart of Midlothian are the current holders, after defeating Queen's Park in the final of the 2025–26 competition.

The final of the 2019–20 season and the whole of the 2020–21 competition was not held due to COVID-19 pandemic.

== Finals ==
=== Key ===
*	Match decided in extra time
†	Match decided by a penalty shootout after extra time

=== Results ===
Season	Winners	Score	Runners-up	Venue	Notes
1983–84	Celtic (1)	2 – 0 *	Rangers	Celtic Park	
1984–85	Aberdeen (1)	5 – 3	Celtic	Pittodrie Stadium	
1985–86	Aberdeen (2)	2 – 0	Queen of the South	Palmerston Park	
1986–87	Celtic (2)	2 – 1	Motherwell	Fir Park	
1987–88	Dunfermline Athletic (1)	2 – 1	Dundee	East End Park	
1988–89	Celtic (3)	1 – 0	Dundee United	Tannadice Park	
1989–90	Dundee United (1)	0 – 0 †	Hibernian	Easter Road	
1990–91	Dundee United (2)	2 – 0	Hibernian	Tannadice Park	
1991–92	Hibernian (1)	2 – 0	Ayr United	Easter Road	
1992–93	Heart of Midlothian (1)	3 – 1	Rangers	Ibrox Stadium	
1993–94	Rangers (1)	5 – 3	Airdrieonians	Broomfield Park	
1994–95	Rangers (2)	2 – 0	St Johnstone	Hampden Park	
1995–96	Celtic (4)	4 – 1	Dundee	Hampden Park	
1996–97	Celtic (5)	3 – 2	Rangers	Broadwood Stadium	
1997–98	Heart of Midlothian (2)	2 – 0	Dundee United	Tynecastle Stadium	
1998–99	Celtic (6)	4 – 0	Dundee	Celtic Park	
1999–00	Heart of Midlothian (3)	5 – 3	Rangers	Hampden Park	
2000–01	Aberdeen (3)	2 – 0	Celtic	Hampden Park	
2001–02	Rangers (3)	4 – 2	Ayr United	New Douglas Park	
2002–03	Celtic (7)	3 – 1 *	Aberdeen	McDiarmid Park	
2003–04	Kilmarnock (1)	1 – 0	Rangers	Rugby Park	
2004–05	Celtic (8)	2 – 0	St Mirren	Hampden Park	
2005–06	Celtic (9)	3 – 1	Heart of Midlothian	Celtic Park	
2006–07	Rangers (4)	5 – 0	Celtic	Hampden Park	
2007–08	Rangers (5)	3 – 1 *	Celtic	Hampden Park	
2008–09	Hibernian (2)	2 – 1 *	Rangers	Hampden Park	
2009–10	Celtic (10)	2 – 0	Rangers	Hampden Park	
2010–11	Celtic (11)	2 – 1 *	Rangers	Hampden Park	
2011–12	Celtic (12)	8 – 0	Queen of the South	Hampden Park	
2012–13	Celtic (13)	3 – 1	Dunfermline Athletic	Hampden Park	
2013–14	Rangers (6)	2 – 2 †	Heart of Midlothian	St Mirren Park	
2014–15	Celtic (14)	5 – 2	Rangers	Hampden Park	
2015–16	Motherwell (1)	5 – 2	Heart of Midlothian	Hampden Park	
2016–17	Celtic (15)	3 – 0	Rangers	Hampden Park	
2017–18	Hibernian (3)	3 – 1	Aberdeen	Hampden Park	
2018–19	Rangers (7)	3 – 2	Celtic	Hampden Park	
2019–20	Aberdeen and Kilmarnock reached the final, but it was never played due to the COVID-19 pandemic				
2020–21	No competition due to the COVID-19 pandemic				
2021–22	Rangers (8)	2 – 1	Heart of Midlothian	Hampden Park	
2022–23	Celtic (16)	6 – 5 *	Rangers	Hampden Park	
2023–24	Rangers (9)	2 – 1	Aberdeen	Hampden Park	
2024–25	Kilmarnock (2)	2 – 0	Dundee	Hampden Park	
2025–26	Heart of Midlothian (4)	4 – 0	Queen's Park	Hampden Park	

== Performance by club ==
Club	Wins	Last win	Runners-up	Last final lost
Celtic	16	2023	5	2019
Rangers	9	2024	11	2023
Heart of Midlothian	4	2026	4	2022
Aberdeen	3	2001	3	2024
Hibernian	3	2018	2	1991
Dundee United	2	1991	2	1998
Kilmarnock	2	2025	—	—
Dunfermline Athletic	1	1988	1	2013
Motherwell	1	2016	1	1987
Dundee	—	—	4	2025
Queen of the South	—	—	2	2012
Ayr United	—	—	2	2002
St Mirren	—	—	1	2005
St Johnstone	—	—	1	1995
Airdrieonians	—	—	1	1994
Queen's Park	—	—	1	2026

== Cup final managers ==
Manager	Club	Wins	Winning Year(s)	Lost	Losing Year(s)	Ref
(Scotland) Willie McStay	Celtic	6	1995–96, 1996–97, 1998–99, 2002–03, 2004–05, 2005–06	1	2000–01	
(Scotland) Stevie Frail	Celtic	3	2009–10, 2010–11, 2014–15			
(Scotland) Billy Kirkwood	Rangers	2	2006–07, 2007–08	3	2008–09, 2009–10, 2010–11	
(Scotland) John Kennedy	Celtic	2	2011–12, 2012–13			
(Scotland) John Brown	Rangers	1	2001–02	1	1999–2000	
(Scotland) Sandy Clark	Heart of Midlothian	1	1992–93			
(Scotland) Peter Houston	Heart of Midlothian	1	1997–98			
(Scotland) John McGlynn	Heart of Midlothian	1	1999–2000			
(Scotland) Drew Jarvie	Aberdeen	1	2000–01			
(Scotland) Alan Robertson	Kilmarnock	1	2003–04			
(Scotland) Alistair Stevenson	Hibernian	1	2008–09			
(Scotland) Gordon Durie	Rangers	1	2013–14			
(Northern Ireland) Stephen Craigan	Motherwell	1	2015–16			
(Scotland) Tommy McIntyre	Celtic	1	2016–17			
(Scotland) Grant Murray	Hibernian	1	2017–18			
(Scotland) David McCallum	Rangers	1	2018–19			
(Scotland) John McLaughlin	Celtic			2	2006–07, 2007–08	
(Scotland) Neil Cooper	Aberdeen			1	2002–03	
(Finland) Mixu Paatelainen	St Mirren			1	2004–05	
(Scotland) Stuart Rome	Queen of the South			1	2011–12	
(Scotland) John Potter	Dunfermline Athletic			1	2012–13	
(Scotland) Robbie Neilson	Heart of Midlothian			1	2013–14	
(Republic of Ireland) Jon Daly	Heart of Midlothian			1	2015–16	
(Scotland) Graeme Murty	Rangers			1	2016–17	
(Scotland) Paul Sheerin	Aberdeen			1	2017–18	
(Scotland) Stephen McManus	Celtic			1	2018–19	

== Notable players ==
Below is a list of Scottish Youth Cup finalists who went on to gain full internationals honours. The years in brackets are the years, in which that player appeared in the Scottish Youth Cup final. The years in bold are the years, in which that player won the trophy.

- (Scotland) Ian Durrant (1984)
- (Scotland) Derek Whyte (**1984**)
- (Scotland) Peter Grant (**1984**)
- (Scotland) Robert Fleck (1984)
- (Scotland) Joe Miller (**1985**)
- (Scotland) Christian Dailly (**1991**)
- (Scotland) Lee Wilkie
- (Scotland) Barry Ferguson
- (Australia) Craig Moore
- (Scotland) Charlie Miller
- (Scotland) Paul Ritchie (**1993**)
- (Scotland) Robbie Neilson (**1998**)
- (Scotland) Scott Severin (**1998**)
- (Scotland) Mark Burchill (**1999**)
- (Scotland) Stephen Hughes (2000)
- (Scotland) Craig Gordon (**2000**)
- (Scotland) Kevin McNaughton (**2001**)
- (Scotland) Shaun Maloney (2001)
- (Scotland) Craig Beattie (2001)
- (Scotland) Stephen McManus (2001)
- (Scotland) John Kennedy (2001)
- (Scotland) Charlie Adam (**2002**)
- (Scotland) Chris Burke (**2002**)
- (Scotland) Alan Hutton (**2002**)

- (Republic of Ireland) Aiden McGeady (**2003**)
- (Scotland) Craig Beattie (**2003**)
- (Scotland) David Marshall (**2003**)
- (Scotland) Ross Wallace (**2003**)
- (Scotland) Charlie Mulgrew (**2003, 2005**)
- (Northern Ireland) Michael McGovern (**2003**)
- (Scotland) Steven Naismith (**2004**)
- (Scotland) Cammy Bell (**2004**)
- (Iceland) Kjartan Finnbogason (**2005**)
- (New Zealand) Michael McGlinchey (**2005, 2006**)
- (Iceland) Teddy Bjarnason (**2005, 2006**)
- (Scotland) Paul Caddis (**2006**, 2007)
- (Republic of Ireland) Darren O'Dea (**2006**)
- (Scotland) Lee Wallace (2006)
- (Scotland) Andrew Shinnie (**2007, 2008**)
- (South Africa) Dean Furman (**2007**)
- (Republic of Ireland) Cillian Sheridan (2007, 2008)
- (Northern Ireland) Daniel Lafferty (2007, 2008)
- (Northern Ireland) Andrew Little (**2008**)
- (Cyprus) Georgios Efrem (**2008**)
- (Norway) Thomas Kind Bendiksen (**2008**)
- (Canada) David Wotherspoon (**2009**)
- (Scotland) Danny Wilson (2009)

- (Scotland) James Forrest (**2010**)
- (Scotland) Dylan McGeouch (**2010, 2012**)
- (Scotland) Stephen O'Donnell (**2011**)
- (Scotland) Callum McGregor (**2010, 2011, 2012, 2013**)
- (Australia) Jackson Irvine (**2011, 2012, 2013**)
- (Scotland) Barrie McKay (**2014**)
- (Scotland) Callum Paterson (2014)
- (Scotland) Kieran Tierney (**2015**)
- (Canada) Fraser Aird (2015)
- (Scotland) Chris Cadden (**2016**)
- (Scotland) David Turnbull (**2016**)
- (Scotland) Billy Gilmour (2017)
- (Northern Ireland) Conor Hazard (**2017**)
- (Scotland) Nathan Patterson (**2019**)
- (Scotland) James Wilson (2022)
- (Scotland) Findlay Curtis (**2024**)
