= 2012–13 Scottish Youth Cup =

2012–13 Scottish FA Youth Cup
SFA Youth Cup

Tournament details
- Country: Scotland
- Teams: 50

Final positions
- Champions: Celtic
- Runners-up: Dunfermline Athletic

The 2012–13 Scottish Youth Cup was the 30th season of the Scottish Youth Cup, the national knockout tournament at youth level organised by the Scottish Football Association for its full and associate member clubs. The tournament is now for the under-20 age group to complement current youth development strategies, having formerly been an under-19 competition.

Celtic won the competition for the fourth year in succession, defeating Dunfermline Athletic, 3–1 in the final at Hampden Park.

== Calendar ==
The final of the competition was brought forward by one day to 1 May 2013 after a request by Dunfermline Athletic, as a number of their youth squad had stepped up to the first-team after the club entered administration.

Round	Match date	Fixtures	Clubs
First Round	Sunday 26 August 2012	3	50 → 47
Second Round	Sunday 23 September 2012	15	47 → 32
Third Round	Sunday 21 October 2012	16	32 → 16
Fourth Round	Sunday 25 November 2012	8	16 → 8
Quarter-finals	Sunday 24 February 2013	4	8 → 4
Semi-finals	Sunday 24 March 2013	2	4 → 2
Final	Wednesday 1 May 2013	1	2 → 1

== Format ==
The sixteen clubs who reached the Fourth round of the 2011–12 competition receive a bye to the third round of this season's tournament. The remaining thirty four clubs enter the first round and are initially divided into three regional groups to reduce travelling. The tournament becomes an all-in national competition from the third round onwards.

== First round ==
The draws for the First and Second Rounds were conducted on 31 July 2012.

=== Central Group ===
Three ties were drawn in this group with the following clubs receiving a bye to the second round:

- Alloa Athletic
- Arbroath
- Berwick Rangers
- Cowdenbeath
- Dumbarton
- East Fife
- Edinburgh City
- Heart of Midlothian
- Motherwell
- Partick Thistle
- Preston Athletic
- Queen's Park
- Raith Rovers
- Spartans
- Stirling Albion

Home team	Score	Away team
East Stirlingshire	w/o	Civil Service Strollers
Rangers	2 – 1	St Johnstone
Clyde	5 – 2	Dundee

=== North Group ===
No First Round ties were drawn in this group with all the following clubs receiving byes to the Second round.

- Brora Rangers
- Clachnacuddin
- Cove Rangers
- Formartine United
- Fort William
- Fraserburgh,
- Huntly
- Ross County

=== South Group ===
No First Round ties were drawn in this group with all the following clubs receiving byes to the Second round.

- Annan Athletic
- Gala Fairydean
- Kilmarnock
- Stranraer
- Threave Rovers

== Second round ==
The second round ties are due to be played on or around 23 September 2012.

=== Central Group ===
Home team	Score	Away team
Arbroath	4 – 0	Preston Athletic
Alloa Athletic	2 – 7	Queen's Park
Rangers	3 – 0	Dumbarton
Partick Thistle	3 – 1	Spartans
Raith Rovers	3 – 0 (a.e.t.)	Berwick Rangers
Heart of Midlothian	2 – 1	Clyde
East Fife	1 – 0	Motherwell
Cowdenbeath	6 – 3	East Stirlingshire
Edinburgh City	3 – 2	Stirling Albion

=== North Group ===
Home team	Score	Away team
Huntly	1 – 2	Fort William
Ross County	6 – 0	Clachnacuddin
Brora Rangers	1 – 8	Formartine United
Fraserburgh	5 – 2	Cove Rangers

=== South Group ===
Gala Fairydean receive a bye to the third round.

Home team	Score	Away team
Annan Athletic	w/o	Threave Rovers
Stranraer	2 – 6	Kilmarnock

== Third round ==
The following sixteen clubs enter at this stage by virtue of having reached the fourth round of last season's competition:

- Aberdeen
- Airdrie United
- Ayr United
- Celtic
- Dundee United
- Dunfermline Athletic
- Falkirk
- Greenock Morton
- Hamilton Academical
- Hibernian
- Inverness Caledonian Thistle
- Livingston
- Montrose
- Queen of the South
- St Mirren
- Stenhousemuir

The third round draw took place on 25 September 2012 at Hampden Park, Glasgow.

Annan Athletic were expelled from the tournament due to player registration errors.

Home team	Score	Away team
Heart of Midlothian	1 – 2	Celtic
Hibernian	13 – 1	Fort William
Annan Athletic	w/o	Montrose
Edinburgh City	1 – 3	Partick Thistle
Gala Fairydean	0 – 13	Kilmarnock
Queen of the South	1 – 5	Hamilton Academical
Stenhousemuir	1 – 3 (a.e.t.)	St Mirren
Cowdenbeath	2 – 1	Airdrie
Arbroath	1 – 5	Aberdeen
Queen's Park	0 – 4	Rangers
Ross County	0 – 2	Dunfermline Athletic
Livingston	8 – 0	Formartine United
Dundee United	7 – 1	Greenock Morton
Ayr United	3 – 0	East Fife
Raith Rovers	1 – 3	Falkirk
Fraserburgh	0 – 8	Inverness Caledonian Thistle

== Fourth round ==
The fourth round draw was conducted on 23 October 2012.

Home team	Score	Away team
Partick Thistle	0 – 6	Inverness Caledonian Thistle
Dunfermline Athletic	10 – 0	Montrose
Rangers	1 – 5	Kilmarnock
Aberdeen	4 – 2	Hamilton Academical
Falkirk	0 – 0 (a.e.t.) (4 – 5 pens)	St Mirren
Livingston	2 – 3	Cowdenbeath
Hibernian	2 – 3 (a.e.t.)	Celtic
Ayr United	1 – 2	Dundee United

== Quarter-finals ==
The Quarter-final draw was conducted on 27 November 2012.

Home team	Score	Away team
Celtic	2 – 0	Aberdeen
Dundee United	1 – 3	St Mirren
Dunfermline Athletic	3 – 2	Inverness Caledonian Thistle
Kilmarnock	6 – 0	Cowdenbeath

== Semi-finals ==
The semi-final draw was conducted at Hampden Park on 27 November 2012.

24 March 2013
13:00

Dunfermline Athletic	3 – 2 (a.e.t.)	St Mirren
Kerr Young 2'; Blair Henderson 89'; Andy Ritchie 118'	DAFC report	66' Kieran Doran; 90+1' Declan Hughes

East End Park, Dunfermline
Attendance: 395
Referee: Lorraine Clark

24 March 2013
14:00

Celtic	1 – 0	Kilmarnock
Patrik Twardzik 76' (pen.)	Celtic FC report

Celtic Park, Glasgow
Referee: Grant Irvine

== Final ==
1 May 2013
19:30

Celtic	3 – 1	Dunfermline Athletic
Jamie Lindsay 53'; Bahrudin Atajić 79'; Denny Johnstone 84'	The Scotsman	80' Allan Smith

Hampden Park, Glasgow
Attendance: 2,769
Referee: Scott Lambie
