= Whitehill Welfare F.C. =

Association football club in Scotland

Whitehill Welfare
- Full name: Whitehill Welfare Football Club
- Founded: 1953; 73 years ago
- Ground: Ferguson Park, Rosewell
- Capacity: 2,454 (192 seated)
- Coordinates: 55°51′15″N 3°7′57″W
- Chairman: Kerr Dodds
- Manager: Josh Walker
- League: East of Scotland League First Division
- 2025–26: East of Scotland League First Division, 12th of 16
- Website: http://www.whitehillwelfare.co.uk/
Home colours	Away colours

Whitehill Welfare Football Club is a football club based in the village of Rosewell, Midlothian, Scotland. They are members of the East of Scotland Football League and play their home matches at Ferguson Park. The club was founded in 1953 and initially competed in juvenile football before turning senior and joining the East of Scotland Football League in 1979. They are the most successful side in East of Scotland League history, winning a total of 16 titles prior to joining the Lowland League as one of its founder members in 2013.

== History ==
The earliest records of Whitehill Welfare indicate that the team first appeared in the 1905–06 season under the name Rosewell Rosedale, replacing the defunct Rosedale Rovers, and playing in the Midlothian Juvenile League. The highlight of this team's existence, it appears, was to reach the Scottish Juvenile Cup Final, and an incident in August 1939 where the police investigated an attack on the Rosewell goalkeeper, accused of letting the side down during a 10–2 defeat.

Although Rosedale continued operating until 1957, it was in 1953 that Whitehill Welfare were formed, the founding fathers being a group of employees from the now defunct Whitehill Colliery. In the early years, Whitehill were the chopping block for the more fancied clubs. Although reaching the Scottish Juvenile Cup semi-final in 1959, they did not really come to the fore until 1964, when they won every trophy in the Mid and East Lothian Section Juvenile League.

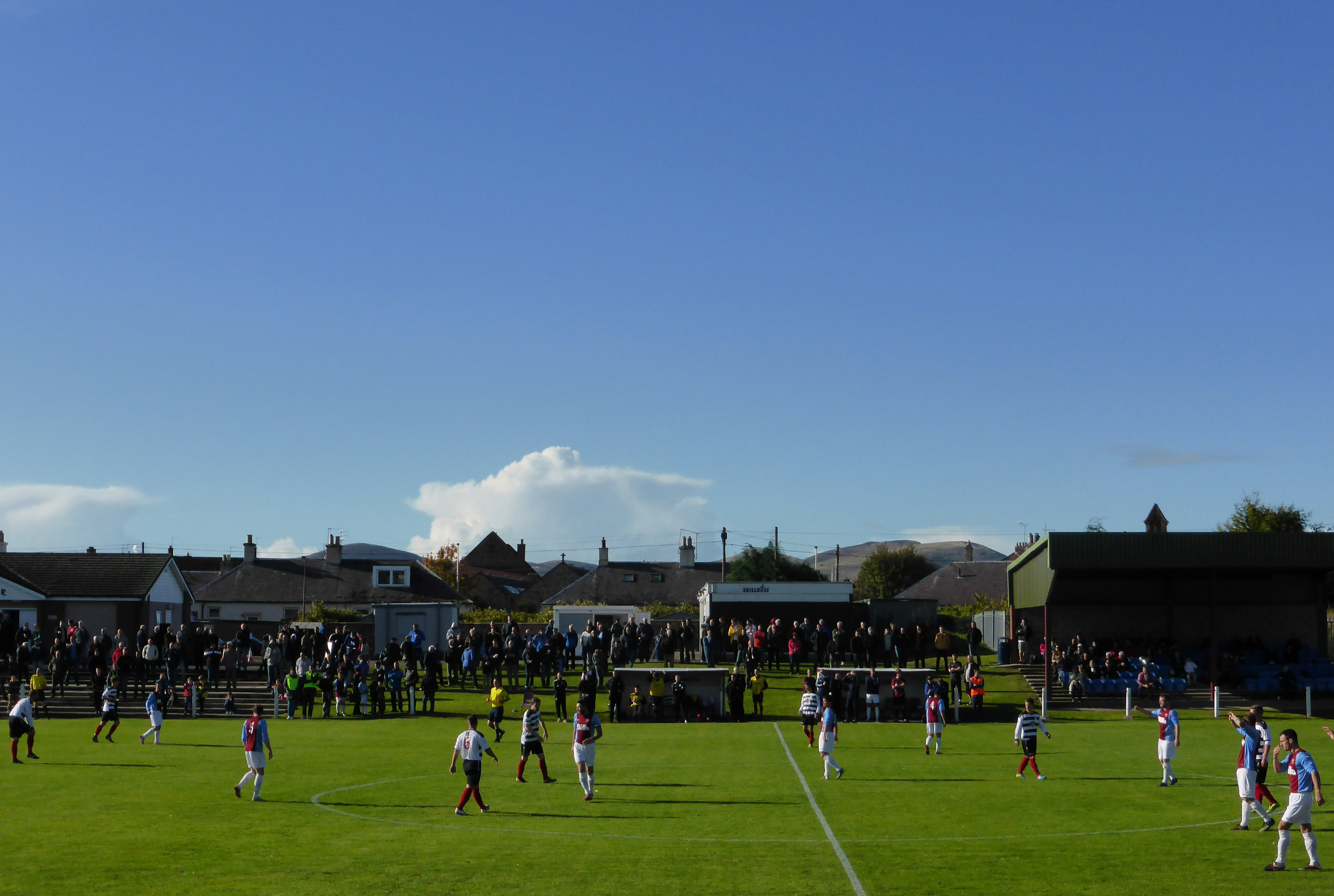
Whitehill Welfare (claret and blue shirts) playing against East Stirlingshire in the second round of the 2014–15 Scottish Cup.

By 1979, there were only six Juvenile clubs left in Whitehill's league, and so the Welfare decided it was time to go senior. This resulted in the team joining the East of Scotland Football League in August 1979, a league which they were to top at the end of their first four seasons. Membership of the Scottish Football Association also has the advantage of allowing the club to compete in the Scottish Cup. In this competition, Whitehill Welfare have knocked out Albion Rovers (1986–87), earned replays against three Scottish Football League sides. The pinnacle of the Whitehill success saw the team, led by player/manager Dave Smith, being unbeaten in over 36 games in local competitions before playing against Celtic in the 1995-96 tournament. The game saw Whitehill Welfare hold Celtic to 0–0 until the 39th minute before ending in a 3–0 defeat. In 1999, Whitehill were stopped short from advancing to the third round of the Scottish Cup, when it lost against Stenhousemuir, 2–0.

The 2012–13 season saw the return of Mike Lawson, who guided the team to the SFA South Region Challenge Cup and completed the double by winning a 16th East of Scotland League title before leaving for Spartans under a cloud, taking 13 players along with him. Whitehill Welfares most successful manager, Dave Smith, returned and was tasked with building a new team and, after a season of bedding this team in, he led this new team to an unprecedented 17th league title and yet another Scottish Qualifying Cup. The club joined the Lowland Football League in 2013 but were relegated back to the East of Scotland league in 2019 (their place taken by Bonnyrigg Rose, a team based just two miles from Rosewell which had only moved to the senior setup from the Junior ranks a year earlier).

Former club captain Andrew Kidd was appointed as manager on 15 November 2020.

== Current squad ==
As of 22 July 2026

Note: Flags indicate national team as defined under FIFA eligibility rules; some limited exceptions apply. Players may hold more than one non-FIFA nationality.

No.	Pos.	Nation	Player
—	GK	SCO	Ali Adams
—	GK	SCO	Ben McGinley
—	GK	SCO	Ross Jardine
—	DF	SCO	Bobby Wilson
—	DF	SCO	Chris Gray
—	DF	SCO	Kevin Keane
—	DF	SCO	James Redpath
—	DF	SCO	Lewis Collins
—	DF	SCO	Robbie Dowie
—	DF	SCO	Tam Prior (Captain)
—	MF	SCO	Sean Hancock

No.	Pos.	Nation	Player
—	MF	SCO	Andrew Kidd
—	MF	SCO	Calum Stark
—	MF	SCO	Cameron Howden
—	MF	SCO	Fraser Neave
—	MF	SCO	Kevin Brown
—	MF	SCO	Leo Marko
—	MF	SCO	Bryan Wilson
—	MF	SCO	Leo Marko
—	MF	SCO	Lewis Service
—	MF	SCO	Luke Rutherford
—	MF	SCO	Matthew Shankey
—	MF	SCO	Mason Renton
—	MF	SCO	Ryan Weir
—	MF	SCO	Ty O'Neill
—	FW	SCO	Dean Ballantyne
—	FW	SCO	Michael Hornig
—	FW	SCO	Dan Garvey
—	FW	SCO	Johnny Grotlin
—	FW	SCO	Connor Spowart
—	FW	SCO	Ryan McCallum
—	FW	NGR	Chris Aikamhenze
—	FW	SCO	Wayne McIntosh

== Coaching staff ==
- Manager: Josh Walker
- Assistant Manager: Ally Elliott
- First Team Staff: Gavin Burrell, Joe Hamill, Ross Gibson.
- Player/Coach: Ryan McCallum
- Under 20s Head Coach: Rikki McNeill
- Physiotherapist: Frank Fleming

== Honours ==
Senior football

- East of Scotland Football League

1979–80, 1980–81, 1981–82, 1982–83, 1984–85, 1985–86, 1987–88, 1992–93, 1993–94, 1994–95, 1995–96, 1997–98, 1998–99, 2002–03, 2007–08, 2012–13

- Scottish Qualifying Cup (South)

1980–81, 1986–87, 1993–94, 1994–95, 1995–96, 1997–98, 1998–99, 1999–00, 2000–01, 2002–03, 2004–05

- SFA South Region Challenge Cup

2012–13, 2015–16

- East of Scotland Qualifying Cup

1980–81, 1984–85, 1985–86, 1991–92, 1993–94, 1998–99, 1999–00, 2000–01, 2008–09, 2013–14

- East of Scotland 'City' Cup

1993–94, 1998–99, 1999–00, 2013–14

- King Cup

1982–83, 1992–93, 1993–94, 1994–95, 1995–96, 1997–98

- East of Scotland League Cup

1987–88, 1998–89, 1990–91, 1991–92, 1994–95, 1995–96, 1996–97, 1997–98, 1998–99, 2002–03, 2006–07, 2007–2008, 2011–12

Juvenile football

- Scottish Juvenile Cup

1969–70, 1970–71, 1974–75, 1977–78

- East of Scotland Juvenile Cup

1969–70, 1970–71, 1974–75, 1977–78

- Walker Cup

1964–65, 1969–70, 1971–72, 1972–73, 1973–74, 1974–75

- Porter Cup

1964–65, 1969–70, 1971–72, 1972–73, 1974–75, 1977–78

- Di Rollo Cup

1964–65, 1965–66, 1966–67, 1970–71, 1971–72, 1972–73, 1973–74, 1974–75

- Howard Cup

1964–65, 1968–69, 1969–70, 1970–71, 1972–73, 1974–75

- Hunter Cup

1974–75, 1975–76

- W. Bauld Cup

1974–75, 1977–78

- Midlothian Juvenile League Championship

1965, 1968, 1970, 1971, 1975, 1977

- Midlothian Juvenile League Cup

1967–68, 1969–70 (joint winners)
