= 2008 UEFA European Under-17 Championship qualifying round =

Football tournament qualification stage

The 2008 UEFA U-17 Championship qualifying round was the first round of qualification for the main tournament of the 2008 UEFA European Under-17 Championship. The top two teams from each group and the best two third-placed teams entered the 2008 UEFA European Under-17 Championship elite round.

== Group 1 ==
Team	Pld	W	D	L	GF	GA	GD	Pts
Switzerland	3	3	0	0	10	1	+9	9
Greece	3	1	1	1	5	4	+1	4
Luxembourg	3	1	1	1	4	7	−3	4
Kazakhstan	3	0	0	3	3	10	−7	0

19 October 2007 18:30

Greece	1–1	Luxembourg
Bossi 5'	Report	Soiledis 32'

Campo Al Ram, Bodio
Referee: Fariz Yusifov (Azerbaijan)

19 October 2007 18:30

Switzerland	4–0	Kazakhstan
Daprelà 5', 80'; Zuber 42'; Ben Khalifa 54'	Report

Cornaredo Stadium, Lugano
Referee: Anders Hermansen (Denmark)

21 October 2007 15:00

Greece	3–1	Kazakhstan
Angeloudis 2', 6'; Niklitsiotis 68'	Report	Prokopenko 33'

Cornaredo Stadium, Lugano
Referee: Ghennadi Sidenco (North Macedonia)

21 October 2007 15:00

Luxembourg	0–4	Switzerland
	Report	Sabedini 20'; Rebronja 37'; Aratore 53', 70'

Comunale, Ascona
Referee: Fariz Yusifov (Azerbaijan)

24 October 2007 18:30

Switzerland	2–1	Greece
Khalifa 55'; Mehmedi 75'	Report	Tachtsidis 60'

Campo Al Ram, Bodio
Referee: Anders Hermansen (Denmark)

24 October 2007 18:30

Kazakhstan	2–3	Luxembourg
Derkach 50'; Chumakov 70'	Report	Pedro 34'; Bossi 51'; Malget 74'

Comunale, Ascona
Referee: Ghennadi Sidenco (North Macedonia)

== Group 2 ==
Team	Pld	W	D	L	GF	GA	GD	Pts
Austria	3	2	0	1	7	5	+2	6
Norway	3	1	1	1	6	4	+2	4
Poland	3	1	1	1	4	2	+2	4
Macedonia	3	1	0	2	4	10	−6	3

1 October 2007 11:00

Austria	4–2	Norway
Tiffner 10'; Schütz 41'; Weimann 55'; Mally 66'	Report	Johnsen 27'; Balstad 90+2'

Sports and Recreational Facility Complex, Niechorze
Referee: Alexandru Deaconu (Romania)

1 October 2007 16:00

Poland	4–1	Macedonia
Czajkowski 31'; Lazicki 50'; Duchnowski 61', 76'	Report	Sabani 13'

City Stadium, Trzebiatow
Referee: Hristo Ristoskov (Bulgaria)

3 October 2007 11:00

Norway	0–0	Poland
	Report

Sports and Recreational Facility Complex, Niechorze
Referee: Hristo Ristoskov (Bulgaria)

3 October 2007 15:00

Austria	2–3	Macedonia
Ildiz 22'; Ivos 75'	Report	Sabani 45+1', 59'; Markov 46'

City Stadium, Trzebiatow
Referee: Hannes Kaasik (Estonia)

6 October 2007 15:00

Poland	0–1	Austria
	Report	Klem 16'

Sports and Recreational Facility Complex, Niechorze
Referee: Alexandru Deaconu (Romania)

6 October 2007 15:00

Macedonia	0–4	Norway
	Report	Møvik 62', 67', 72'; Ibrahim 73'

City Stadium, Trzebiatow
Referee: Hannes Kaasik (Estonia)

== Group 3 ==
Team	Pld	W	D	L	GF	GA	GD	Pts
Slovakia	3	3	0	0	11	0	+11	9
Scotland	3	2	0	1	13	5	+8	6
Belarus	3	1	0	2	6	8	−2	3
Liechtenstein	3	0	0	3	1	18	−17	0

19 September 2007 20:30

Belarus	5–1	Liechtenstein
Erchik 30', 35'; Butskevich 49'; Karostsik 69'; Pyatrow 77'	Report	Kugan 62' (o.g.)

Bayview Stadium, Methil
Referee: Ninoslav Spasic (Serbia)

19 September 2007 20:30

Scotland	0–4	Slovakia
	Report	Mak 18', 68'; Klabník 40'; Vavrík 40+1'

Stark's Park, Kirkcaldy
Referee: Thomas Vejlgaard (Denmark)

21 September 2007 20:30

Belarus	0–2	Slovakia
	Report	Erchik 18' (o.g.); Kravchuk 80' (o.g.)

Bayview Stadium, Methil
Referee: Ninoslav Spasic (Serbia)

21 September 2007 20:30

Liechtenstein	0–8	Scotland
	Report	Beck 11' (o.g.); Fitzharris 16', 47'; Love 23', 65'; Smith 31', 49'; McHugh 80'

Almondvale Stadium, Livingston
Referee: Christopher Lautier (Malta)

24 September 2007 20:30

Scotland	5–1	Belarus
Smith 17'; Fitzharris 41'; Campbell 43', 63', 80'	Report	Yerchyk 80+1'

Broadwood Stadium, Cumbernauld
Referee: Thomas Vejlgaard (Denmark)

24 September 2007 20:30

Slovakia	5–0	Liechtenstein
Moravčík 33'; Mak 38', 59'; Žilák 73'; Vavrík 80+1'	Report

Stark's Park, Kirkcaldy
Referee: Christopher Lautier (Malta)

== Group 4 ==
Team	Pld	W	D	L	GF	GA	GD	Pts
Spain	3	2	1	0	11	2	+9	7
Wales	3	2	1	0	7	3	+4	7
Andorra	3	1	0	2	3	4	−1	3
San Marino	3	0	0	3	1	13	−12	0

1 October 2007 12:00

Spain	6–0	San Marino
Pacheco 16', 40', 90+3'; Thiago 45+3', 46'; Vallecillo 66'	Report

Estadi Comunal, Andorra la Vella
Referee: Petur Reinert (Faroe Islands)

1 October 2007 16:00

Wales	1–0	Andorra
Mason 61'	Report

Estadi Comunal, Andorra la Vella
Referee: Dragomir Stanković (Serbia)

3 October 2007 12:00

Spain	3–0	Andorra
Vidal 10'; Thiago 45+3'; Keko 58'	Report

Estadi Comunal, Andorra la Vella
Referee: Mario Vlk (Slovakia)

3 October 2007 16:00

San Marino	1–4	Wales
Dolcini 74' (pen.)	Report	Howard 3'; Davey 22'; Evans 29', 71'

Estadi Comunal, Andorra la Vella
Referee: Petur Reinert (Faroe Islands)

6 October 2007 12:00

Wales	2–2	Spain
Howard 45'; Morales 60' (o.g.)	Report	Keko 27', 76'

Estadi Comunal, Andorra la Vella
Referee: Mario Vlk (Slovakia)

6 October 2007 12:00

Andorra	3–0	San Marino
Valls 43', 47', 69'	Report

Estadi Comunal, Andorra la Vella
Referee: Dragomir Stanković (Serbia)

== Group 5 ==
Team	Pld	W	D	L	GF	GA	GD	Pts
Republic of Ireland	3	3	0	0	6	1	+5	9
Denmark	3	1	1	1	3	3	0	4
Slovenia	3	0	2	1	2	3	−1	2
Ukraine	3	0	1	2	2	6	−4	1

14 September 2007 15:30

Denmark	1–1	Slovenia
Andersen 17'	Report	Berić 15'

Athlone Town Stadium, Athlone
Referee: Jiri Jech (Czech Republic)

14 September 2007 20:00

Ukraine	1–3	Republic of Ireland
Kartushov 29'	Report	Hourihane 34'; Sheppard 72'; Gunning 74'

Terryland Park, Galway

16 September 2007 15:30

Slovenia	1–1	Ukraine
Arčon 75'	Report	Sylantyev 56'

Flancare Park, Longford

16 September 2007 20:00

Denmark	0–2	Republic of Ireland
	Report	Doran 31'; Connolly 40'

Athlone Town Stadium, Athlone
Referee: Audrius Žuta (Lithuania)

19 September 2007 20:00

Ukraine	0–2	Denmark
	Report	Sarić 27'; Christens 73'

Terryland Park, Galway

19 September 2007 20:00

Republic of Ireland	1–0	Slovenia
Hourihane 90+1'	Report

Flancare Park, Longford

== Group 6 ==
Team	Pld	W	D	L	GF	GA	GD	Pts
Germany	3	1	2	0	10	2	+8	5
Romania	3	1	2	0	2	1	+1	5
Sweden	3	1	1	1	6	4	+2	4
Faroe Islands	3	0	1	2	2	13	−11	1

25 October 2007 11:00

Germany	8–0	Faroe Islands
Kroos 14', 43', 47'; Stiepermann 19'; V. Davidsen 52' (o.g.); Zellner 57'; Baştürk 59'; Hartmann 71'	Report

Albstadion, Heidenheim
Referee: Matej Jug (Slovenia)

25 October 2007 11:00

Romania	1–0	Sweden
Stoian 32'	Report

Stadion im Stauferpark, Donauwörth
Referee: Albert Toussaint (Luxembourg)

27 October 2007 14:00

Faroe Islands	0–0	Romania
	Report

Stadion am Schlüsselhäuser Kreuz, Aindling
Referee: Matej Jug (Slovenia)

27 October 2007 14:30

Germany	1–1	Sweden
Zellner 75'	Report	Söder 70'

Gerd-Müller-Stadion, Nördlingen
Referee: Bas Nijhuis (Netherlands)

30 October 2007 15:00

Romania	1–1	Germany
Matei 90+3'	Report	Kroos 25'

Scholz-Arena, Aalen
Referee: Bas Nijhuis (Netherlands)

30 October 2007 15:00

Sweden	5–2	Faroe Islands
Mustafa 24', 71'; Aziz 33', 64', 77'	Report	Sørensen 68'; V. Davidsen 78'

Gerd-Müller-Stadion, Nördlingen
Referee: Albert Toussaint (Luxembourg)

== Group 7 ==
Team	Pld	W	D	L	GF	GA	GD	Pts
Israel	3	2	1	0	5	1	+4	7
Serbia	3	2	0	1	4	2	+2	6
Iceland	3	1	0	2	1	4	−3	3
Lithuania	3	0	1	2	0	3	−3	1

27 September 2007 15:30

Serbia	1–0	Iceland
Stevanović 3'	Report

Čika Dača, Kragujevac
Referee: Mihaly Fabian (Hungary)

27 September 2007 15:30

Israel	0–0	Lithuania
	Report

City Stadium, Jagodina
Referee: Alan Black (Northern Ireland)

29 September 2007 15:30

Serbia	2–0	Lithuania
Aleksić 39', 72'	Report

City Stadium, Jagodina
Referee: Lasha Silagava (Georgia (country))

29 September 2007 15:30

Iceland	0–3	Israel
	Report	Barak 34' (pen.), 45' (pen.); Avitan 90+4'

Čika Dača, Kragujevac
Referee: Mihaly Fabian (Hungary)

2 October 2007 15:30

Israel	2–1	Serbia
Atadjanov 33'; Ghadir 75'	Report	Stevanović 7'

Čika Dača, Kragujevac
Referee: Lasha Silagava (Georgia (country))

2 October 2007 15:30

Lithuania	0–1	Iceland
	Report	Finsen 57'

City Stadium, Jagodina
Referee: Alan Black (Northern Ireland)

== Group 8 ==
Team	Pld	W	D	L	GF	GA	GD	Pts
Croatia	3	2	1	0	6	0	+6	7
Hungary	3	2	1	0	4	0	+4	7
Georgia	3	1	0	2	5	7	−2	3
Bulgaria	3	0	0	3	2	10	−8	0

24 September 2007 15:00

Croatia	4–0	Georgia
Kelic 26'; Bicvic 50'; Kokot 66'; Lendric 70'	Report

Albena-1, Albena
Referee: Svein-Erik Edvartsen (Norway)

24 September 2007 17:00

Hungary	3–0	Bulgaria
Csíki 5', 31'; Csorba 24'	Report

Kaliakra, Kavarna
Referee: Sergey Gorokhovodatskiy (Kazakhstan)

26 September 2007 15:00

Georgia	0–1	Hungary
	Report	Laczkovich 63'

Albena-1, Albena
Referee: Sergey Gorokhovodatskiy (Kazakhstan)

26 September 2007 17:00

Croatia	2–0	Bulgaria
Ozobic 29'; Kokot 31'	Report

Kaliakra, Kavarna
Referee: Augustus Constantin (Romania)

29 September 2007 16:00

Hungary	0–0	Croatia
	Report

Albena-1, Albena
Referee: Augustus Constantin (Romania)

29 September 2007 16:00

Bulgaria	2–5	Georgia
Atanasov 18'; Pavlov 23' (pen.)	Report	Dzalamidze 2', 46'; Pachkoria 37' (pen.); Sheqiladze 62'; Gordeziani 76' (pen.)

Kaliakra, Kavarna
Referee: Svein-Erik Edvartsen (Norway)

== Group 9 ==
Team	Pld	W	D	L	GF	GA	GD	Pts
Bosnia and Herzegovina	3	2	0	1	2	2	±0	6
Russia	3	1	2	0	4	2	+2	5
Azerbaijan	3	0	2	1	3	4	−1	2
Finland	3	0	2	1	3	4	−1	2

01 October 2007 15:00

Finland	0–1	Bosnia and Herzegovina
	Report	Radulovic 24'

Grbavica, Sarajevo
Referee: Simon Lee Evans (Wales)

01 October 2007 15:00

Russia	1–1	Azerbaijan
Zabolotnyy 48'	Report	Abdullayev 35'

Koševo, Sarajevo
Referee: Cyril Zimmermann (Switzerland)

03 October 2007 15:00

Finland	2–2	Azerbaijan
Dalla Valle 27', 80+3'	Report	Nurahmadov 68'; Bayramov 72'

Stamal Arena, Kreševo
Referee: Leontios Trattou (Cyprus)

03 October 2007 15:00

Bosnia and Herzegovina	0–2	Russia
	Report	Pugachev 70'; Logua 80+3'

Koševo, Sarajevo
Referee: Simon Lee Evans (Wales)

06 October 2007 15:00

Russia	1–1	Finland
Logua 70'	Report	Dalla Valle 60'

Stamal Arena, Kreševo
Referee: Cyril Zimmermann (Switzerland)

06 October 2007 15:00

Azerbaijan	0–1	Bosnia and Herzegovina
	Report	Baric 20'

Koševo, Sarajevo
Referee: Leontios Trattou (Cyprus)

== Group 10 ==
Team	Pld	W	D	L	GF	GA	GD	Pts
Netherlands	3	3	0	0	7	1	+6	9
France	3	2	0	1	7	1	+6	6
Latvia	3	0	1	2	2	5	−3	1
Albania	3	0	1	2	1	10	−9	1

23 October 2007 14:30

France	1–0	Latvia
Ihou 11' (pen.)	Report

Niko Dovana, Durrës
Referee: Siniša Zrnić (Bosnia and Herzegovina)

23 October 2007 14:30

Netherlands	3–0	Albania
Castillion 10', 39'; Mokthar 54'	Report

Selman Stërmasi, Tirana
Referee: Adrian Casha (Malta)

25 October 2007 14:30

France	6–0	Albania
Grenier 4', 35', 75'; Fofana 30', 39'; Kakuta 36'	Report

Selman Stërmasi, Tirana
Referee: Kuddusi Müftüoglu (Turkey)

25 October 2007 14:30

Latvia	1–3	Netherlands
Cepuritis 13'	Report	Castillion 5', 29'; Hoesen 23'

Niko Dovana, Durrës
Referee: Adrian Casha (Malta)

28 October 2007 14:30

Netherlands	1–0	France
Castillion 2'	Report

Niko Dovana, Durrës
Referee: Siniša Zrnić (Bosnia and Herzegovina)

28 October 2007 14:30

Albania	1-1	Latvia
Mici 72' (pen.)	Report	Zjuzins 58'

Selman Stërmasi, Tirana
Referee: Kuddusi Müftüoglu (Turkey)

== Group 11 ==
Team	Pld	W	D	L	GF	GA	GD	Pts
England	3	2	1	0	12	0	+12	7
Portugal	3	2	1	0	8	0	+8	7
Estonia	3	0	1	2	0	8	−8	1
Malta	3	0	1	2	0	12	−12	1

21 October 2007 13:00

Malta	0–6	England
	Report	Donaldson 18', 68'; Delfouneso 22', 24', 56'; James 80'

Kadriorg Stadium, Tallinn
Referee: Damien Ledentu (France)

21 October 2007 16:00

Portugal	2–0	Estonia
Rafael 28'; N. Oliveira 51'	Report

A. Le Coq Arena, Tallinn
Referee: Magnus Thorisson (Iceland)

23 October 2007 16:00

Portugal	6–0	Malta
Ferrão 4', 59'; Zahavi 11', 21', 73'; Carvalho 18'	Report

Kadriorg Stadium, Tallinn
Referee: Magnus Thorisson (Iceland)

23 October 2007 17:45

Estonia	0–6	England
	Report	James 10'; Delfouneso 33'; Briggs 38'; Parrett 55'; Wilshere 70'; Rodwell 90+4'

A. Le Coq Arena, Tallinn
Referee: Nebojsa Rabrenovic (Montenegro)

26 October 2007 13:00

Portugal	0–0	England
	Report

Kadriorg Stadium, Tallinn
Referee: Damien Ledentu (France)

26 October 2007 13:00

Estonia	0–0	Malta
	Report

A. Le Coq Arena, Tallinn
Referee: Nebojša Rabrenović (Montenegro)

== Group 12 ==
Team	Pld	W	D	L	GF	GA	GD	Pts
Northern Ireland	3	3	0	0	5	0	+5	9
Belgium	3	2	0	1	5	1	+4	6
Moldova	3	1	0	2	3	7	−4	3
Montenegro	3	0	0	3	1	6	−5	0

22 October 2007 18:00

Northern Ireland	3–0	Moldova
Davidson 40+1'; Bunting 51'; McCrudden 61'	Report

Maurits De Waele, Maldegem
Referee: Sergiy Berezka (Ukraine)

22 October 2007 20:00

Belgium	2–0	Montenegro
Longueville 61'; David 78'	Report

KFC Eeklo, Eeklo
Referee: Arman Amirkhanyan (Armenia)

24 October 2007 15:00

Montenegro	0–1	Northern Ireland
	Report	Bunting 73' (pen.)

Gemeentelijke, Aalter
Referee: Markus Strömbergsson (Sweden)

24 October 2007 19:00

Belgium	3–0	Moldova
Dewaest 34', 36'; Lagouireh 50'	Report

Gemeentelijke, Aalter
Referee: Sergiy Berezka (Ukraine)

27 October 2007 16:00

Northern Ireland	1–0	Belgium
Bunting 61'	Report

Maurits De Waele, Maldegem
Referee: Markus Strömbergsson (Sweden)

27 October 2007 16:00

Moldova	3–1	Montenegro
Onofrei 14', 80+2'; Mandricenco 18'	Report	Vešović 72' (pen.)

KFC Eeklo, Eeklo
Referee: Arman Amirkhanyan (Armenia)

== Group 13 ==
Team	Pld	W	D	L	GF	GA	GD	Pts
Italy	3	3	0	0	11	3	+8	9
Czech Republic	3	2	0	1	14	3	+11	6
Cyprus	3	1	0	2	4	15	−11	3
Armenia	3	0	0	3	2	10	−8	0

2 October 2007 16:00

Italy	2–1	Armenia
Destro 64'; Santon 73' (pen.)	Report	Hovhannisyan 17'

Český Dub
Referee: Goran Spirkoski (North Macedonia)

2 October 2007 16:00

Czech Republic	8–0	Cyprus
Kolarik 3'; Kadlec 40+1', 59'; Boril 42'; Stourac 44' (pen.), 69'; Vasicek 65', 72'	Report

Benátky nad Jizerou
Referee: Csaba Sapi (Hungary)

4 October 2007 16:00

Italy	7–1	Cyprus
Albertazzi 8'; Petrucci 10'; D'alessandro 18', 56'; Ragatzu 51', 75'; La Rocca 62' (pen.)	Report	Charalampous 24'

Benátky nad Jizerou
Referee: Adrian McCourt (Northern Ireland)

4 October 2007 16:00

Armenia	1–5	Czech Republic
Stepanyan 50'	Report	Kadlec 3', 59'; Stourac 23'; Kolarik 31'; Farmacka 67' (pen.)

Hrádek nad Nisou
Referee: Csaba Sapi (Hungary)

7 October 2007 16:00

Czech Republic	1–2	Italy
Smrz 42'	Report	Albertazzi 22'; Sala 53'

Český Dub
Referee: Adrian McCourt (Northern Ireland)

7 October 2007 16:00

Cyprus	3–0	Armenia
Michail 40', 47'; Demetriou 45'	Report

Hrádek nad Nisou
Referee: Goran Spirkoski (North Macedonia)

== Third-placed teams ==
Slovenia and Sweden advanced for the elite round as the two best third-placed teams.

Team	Grp	W	D	L	GF	GA	GD	Pts
Slovenia	5	0	1	1	1	2	−1	1
Sweden	6	0	1	1	1	2	−1	1
Azerbaijan	9	0	1	1	1	2	−1	1
Poland	2	0	1	1	0	1	−1	1
Luxembourg	1	0	1	1	1	5	−4	1
Latvia	10	0	0	2	1	4	−3	0
Andorra	4	0	0	2	0	4	−4	0
Iceland	7	0	0	2	0	4	−4	0
Georgia	8	0	0	2	0	5	−5	0
Belarus	3	0	0	2	1	7	−6	0
Moldova	12	0	0	2	0	6	−6	0
Estonia	11	0	0	2	0	8	−8	0
Cyprus	13	0	0	2	1	15	−14	0
