= 2009 UEFA European Under-19 Championship qualification =

Youth football qualifications

2009 UEFA U-19 Championship (qualifying round) was the first round of qualifications for the Final Tournament of 2009 UEFA European Under-19 Championship. The final tournament of the 2009 UEFA European Under-19 Championship is preceded by two qualification stages: a qualifying round and an Elite round. During these rounds, 52 national teams are competing to determine the seven teams that will join the already qualified host nation Ukraine.

The first qualifying round was played between 2 October and 27 November 2008. The 52 teams were divided into 13 groups of four teams, with each group being contested as a mini-tournament, hosted by one of the group's teams. After all matches have been played, the 13 group winners and 13 group runners-up advanced to the Elite round. Alongside the 26 winner and runner-up teams, the two best third-placed teams also qualified.

The host team of each group's mini-tournament are indicated in italics in the tables below.

== First qualification round groups ==
=== Group 1 ===
Team	Pld	W	D	L	GF	GA	GD	Pts
Scotland	3	2	1	0	10	1	+9	7
Hungary (H)	3	2	0	1	7	1	+6	6
Azerbaijan	3	1	1	1	6	2	+4	4
San Marino	3	0	0	3	0	19	−19	0

(H) Hosts
20 October 2008

Scotland	1 – 1	Azerbaijan
MacDonald 30'	Report	Abdullayev 4'

Tiszaújváros Stadion, Tiszaújváros
Referee: René Rogalla (Switzerland)

20 October 2008

Hungary	6 – 0	San Marino
Della Valle 11' (o.g.); Tamasi 31'; Takacs 35'; Bajner 73', 86', 89'	Report

Városi Stadion, Nyíregyháza
Referee: César Muñiz Fernández (Spain)

22 October 2008

Scotland	8 – 0	San Marino
MacDonald 4', 45+2'; Russell 13', 61'; Stirling 19' (pen.), 30' (pen.), 32'; Currie 90'	Report

Tiszaújváros Stadion, Tiszaújváros
Referee: Cyril Zimmermann (Switzerland)

22 October 2008

Azerbaijan	0 – 1	Hungary
	Report	Litauszki 90+3'

Városi Stadion, Nyíregyháza
Referee: Antonio Rubinos Perez (Spain)

25 October 2008

Hungary	0 – 1	Scotland
	Report	Stirling 13'

Városi Stadion, Nyíregyháza
Referee: Claudio Circhetta (Switzerland)

25 October 2008

San Marino	0 – 5	Azerbaijan
	Report	Mammadov 11'; Guliyev 14', 18'; Hasanov 63'; Mustafayev 90+3' (pen.)

Tiszaújváros Stadion, Tiszaújváros
Referee: Carlos Velasco Carballo (Spain)

=== Group 2 ===
Team	Pld	W	D	L	GF	GA	GD	Pts
Belgium	3	2	1	0	9	3	+6	7
Estonia (H)	3	2	0	1	6	7	−1	6
Croatia	3	1	1	1	7	6	+1	4
Kazakhstan	3	0	0	3	2	8	−6	0

(H) Hosts
5 October 2008

Belgium	2 – 1	Kazakhstan
Benteke 12'; De Pauw 85'	Report	Abdukarimov 80'

Kuusalu Stadium, Kuusalu
Referee: Augustus Viorel Constantin (Romania)

5 October 2008

Croatia	1 – 4	Estonia
Tokić 86'	Report	Alliku 8', 29'; Ojamaa 33'; Anier 68'

Kadrioru Stadium, Tallinn
Referee: Markus Strömbergsson (Sweden)

7 October 2008

Croatia	4 – 0	Kazakhstan
Antolić 20'; D. Škvorc 50'; Abdurahimi 60'; Dubkov 90+2' (o.g.)	Report

Kuusalu Stadium, Kuusalu
Referee: Augustus Viorel Constantin (Romania)

7 October 2008

Estonia	0 – 5	Belgium
	Report	Hazard 3'; Francois 24'; De Pauw 40'; Benteke 66' (pen.); Kocabas 73'

Kadrioru Stadium, Tallinn
Referee: Ian Stokes (Republic of Ireland)

10 October 2008

Belgium	2 – 2	Croatia
Hazard 51' (pen.), 74' (pen.)	Report	Pavlović 38'; D. Škvorc 40'

Kuusalu Stadium, Kuusalu
Referee: Ian Stokes (Republic of Ireland)

10 October 2008

Kazakhstan	1 – 2	Estonia
Khizhnichenko 51'	Report	Kaldoja 45+1'; Alliku 52'

Kadrioru Stadium, Tallinn
Referee: Markus Strömbergsson (Sweden)

=== Group 3 ===
Team	Pld	W	D	L	GF	GA	GD	Pts
Russia	3	3	0	0	5	0	+5	9
Latvia	3	1	1	1	3	4	−1	4
Italy	3	0	2	1	4	5	−1	2
Moldova (H)	3	0	1	2	2	5	−3	1

(H) Hosts
2 October 2008

Italy	2 – 2	Latvia
Romizi 45+2'; Petrucci 81'	Report	Sinelnikovs 8'; Dubra 49'

District Sport Complex, Orhei
Attendance: 350
Referee: Bas Nijhuis (Netherlands)

2 October 2008

Russia	2 – 0	Moldova
Candariuc 9' (o.g.); Dmitriyev 90'	Report

Zimbru Stadium, Chişinău
Attendance: 800
Referee: David Malcolm (Northern Ireland)

4 October 2008

Italy	2 – 2	Moldova
Mendicino 22', 90+3'	Report	Vornisel 5'; Cheptine 67'

Zimbru Stadium, Chișinău
Attendance: 800
Referee: Fırat Aydınus (Turkey)

4 October 2008

Latvia	0 – 2	Russia
	Report	Sergei Perunov 3'; Dmitriyev 59'

District Sport Complex, Orhei
Attendance: 800
Referee: Adrian Mccourt (Northern Ireland)

7 October 2008

Russia	1 – 0	Italy
Grigoryev 2' (pen.)	Report

District Sport Complex, Orhei
Attendance: 1500
Referee: Bas Nijhuis (Netherlands)

7 October 2008

Moldova	0 – 1	Latvia
	Report	Pētersons 19'

Zimbru Stadium, Chișinău
Attendance: 300
Referee: Fırat Aydınus (Turkey)

=== Group 4 ===
Team	Pld	W	D	L	GF	GA	GD	Pts
France	3	3	0	0	9	0	+9	9
Republic of Ireland	3	2	0	1	3	2	+1	6
Malta (H)	3	0	1	2	1	6	−5	1
Liechtenstein	3	0	1	2	1	6	−5	1

(H) Hosts
21 November 2008

Republic of Ireland	2 – 0	Malta
McArdle 80'; Murphy 88'	Report

Centenary Stadium, Ta' Qali
Referee: István Vad (Hungary)

21 November 2008

France	4 – 0	Liechtenstein
Brahimi 18', 77'; Bazile 23'; Le Tallec 59'	Report

Centenary Stadium, Ta 'Qali
Referee: Veaceslav Banari (Moldova)

23 November 2008

Republic of Ireland	1 – 0	Liechtenstein
Clifford 84'	Report

Centenary Stadium, Ta 'Qali
Referee: Veaceslav Banari (Moldova)

23 November 2008

Malta	0 – 3	France
	Report	Brahimi 11', 45'; Gueye 59'

Centenary Stadium, Ta 'Qali
Referee: Dejan Filipović (Serbia)

26 November 2008

France	2 – 0	Republic of Ireland
Brahimi 79'; Le Tallec 84'	Report

Hibernians Ground, Paola
Referee: István Vad (Hungary)

26 November 2008

Liechtenstein	1 – 1	Malta
Eberle 89'	Report	Vella 61'

Centenary Stadium, Ta 'Qali
Referee: Dejan Filipović (Serbia)

=== Group 5 ===
Team	Pld	W	D	L	GF	GA	GD	Pts
Norway	3	2	0	1	5	3	+2	6
Slovenia (H)	3	2	0	1	7	6	+1	6
Slovakia	3	2	0	1	4	3	+1	6
Armenia	3	0	0	3	3	7	−4	0

(H) Hosts
10 October 2008

Norway	4 – 2	Slovenia
Berget 14'; Nordtveit 42', 84'; Stokkelien 89'	Report	Milec 24'; Belamea 30'

Mestni Stadion Ptuj, Ptuj
Referee: Nicola Rizzoli (Italy)

10 October 2008

Slovakia	3 – 1	Armenia
Guldan 62'; Valenta 85'; Vlasko 90+3' (pen.)	Report	Tadevosyan 28'

Fazanerija, Murska Sobota
Referee: Mark Courtney (Northern Ireland)

12 October 2008

Slovakia	0 – 2	Slovenia
	Report	Spreco 65'; Berić 70'

Sports Park, Lendava
Referee: Andrea De Marco (Italy)

12 October 2008

Armenia	0 – 1	Norway
	Report	Nordtveit 38'

Mestni Stadion Ptuj, Ptuj
Referee: David Mckeon (Northern Ireland)

15 October 2008

Norway	0 – 1	Slovakia
	Report	Vlasko 20'

Sports Park, Lendava
Referee: Steve Tanner (England)

15 October 2008

Slovenia	3 – 2	Armenia
Omerović 64'; Rep 69'; Krhin 78'	Report	Aroyan 9', 55'

Fazanerija, Murska Sobota
Referee: Massimiliano Saccani (Italy)

=== Group 6 ===
Team	Pld	W	D	L	GF	GA	GD	Pts
Germany (H)	3	3	0	0	10	1	+9	9
Netherlands	3	2	0	1	8	5	+3	6
Lithuania	3	1	0	2	4	9	−5	3
Luxembourg	3	0	0	3	2	9	−7	0

(H) Hosts
9 October 2008

Netherlands	4 – 1	Lithuania
Wijnaldum 12', 53'; Pedro 17'; Strootman 88'	Report	Krušna 25'

Saar-Mosel, Konz
Referee: Anders Hermansen (Denmark)

9 October 2008

Germany	3 – 0	Luxembourg
Bigalke 10' (pen.), 24'; Esswein 65'	Report

Moselstadion, Trier
Referee: Tsvetan Georgiev (Bulgaria)

11 October 2008

Germany	5 – 0	Lithuania
Sukuta-Pasu 12', 40'; Holtby 15'; Bigalke 17'; Kirchhoff 54'	Report

Salmtalstadion, Salmrohr
Referee: Ovidiu Alin Hategan (Romania)

11 October 2008

Luxembourg	2 – 3	Netherlands
Pedro 28'; Hilbert 52'	Report	Wijnaldum 34'; Pedro 65'; Heil 80' (o.g.)

Stade Alphonse Theis, Hesperange
Referee: Tsvetan Georgiev (Bulgaria)

14 October 2008

Germany	2 – 1	Netherlands
Schürrle 22'; Bigalke 84' (pen.)	Report	Fer 59'

Moselstadion, Trier
Referee: Anders Hermansen (Denmark)

14 October 2008

Luxembourg	0 – 3	Lithuania
	Report	Babachin 11'; Petkus 35'; Juozaitis 90+2'

Op Biirk, Mensdorf
Referee: Ovidiu Alin Hategan (Romania)

=== Group 7 ===
Team	Pld	W	D	L	GF	GA	GD	Pts
Denmark	3	1	2	0	4	3	+1	5
Czech Republic	3	1	2	0	2	1	+1	5
Georgia	3	0	2	1	2	3	−1	2
Cyprus (H)	3	0	2	1	2	3	−1	2

(H) Hosts
22 November 2008

Czech Republic	1 – 1	Cyprus
Šural 63'	Report	Pittaras 65'

Ammochostos Stadium, Larnaca
Referee: Douglas McDonald (Scotland)

22 November 2008

Georgia	2 – 2	Denmark
Kakubava 4'; Kantaria 29'	Report	Boysen 42'; Feldballe 89'

Paralimni Stadium, Paralimni
Referee: Tony Chapron (France)

24 November 2008

Czech Republic	0 – 0	Denmark
	Report

Dasaki Stadium, Achna
Referee: Iain Brines (Scotland)

24 November 2008

Cyprus	0 – 0	Georgia
	Report

Makario Stadium, Nicosia
Referee: Said Ennjimi (France)

27 November 2008

Georgia	0 – 1	Czech Republic
	Report	Šural 70'

Gyunas Syllogos Zenon, Larnaca
Referee: Calum Murray (Scotland)

27 November 2008

Denmark	2 – 1	Cyprus
Gytkjaer 65'; Nielsen 84'	Report	Pittaras 60'

Oliver Thuai, Larnaca
Referee: Douglas McDonald (Scotland)

=== Group 8 ===
Team	Pld	W	D	L	GF	GA	GD	Pts
Sweden	3	1	2	0	8	4	+4	5
Austria	3	1	2	0	6	3	+3	5
Macedonia (H)	3	1	1	1	3	6	−3	4
Iceland	3	0	1	2	3	7	−4	1

(H) Hosts
11 October 2008

Sweden	3 – 3	Iceland
Çelik 18'; Helg 43', 89'	Report	Sigurðarson 45', 82'; Guðmundsson 55' (pen.)

Gjorče Petrov Stadium, Skopje
Referee: Simon Lee Evans (Wales)

11 October 2008

Austria	2 – 2	Macedonia
Dibon 56', 70'	Report	Shabani 25'; Nestorovki 65'

Boris Trajkovski Sports Arena, Skopje
Referee: Sergiy Berezka (Ukraine)

13 October 2008

Sweden	4 – 0	Macedonia
Törnstrand 17'; Sudić 60'; Hamad 81'; Demir 88'	Report

Gjorče Petrov Stadium, Skopje
Referee: Sergiy Berezka (Ukraine)

13 October 2008

Iceland	0 – 3	Austria
	Report	Dragović 12'; Kropfl 37'; Weimann 90+3'

Boris Trajkovski Sports Arena, Skopje
Referee: Albert Toussaint (Luxembourg)

16 October 2008

Austria	1 – 1	Sweden
Elsneg 90'	Report	Jonsson 31'

Gjorče Petrov Stadium, Skopje
Referee: Albert Toussaint (Luxembourg)

16 October 2008

Macedonia	1 – 0	Iceland
Shabani 68'	Report

Boris Trajkovski Sports Arena, Skopje
Referee: Simon Lee Evans (Wales)

=== Group 9 ===
Team	Pld	W	D	L	GF	GA	GD	Pts
Serbia	3	3	0	0	12	2	+10	9
England	3	2	0	1	7	5	+2	6
Northern Ireland (H)	3	1	0	2	4	7	−3	3
Albania	3	0	0	3	1	10	−9	0

(H) Hosts
8 October 2008

Serbia	3 – 1	Northern Ireland
Milanović 20'; Milić 24'; Aleksić 75'	Report	Ramsey 90'

Seaview, Belfast
Referee: Aleksei Kulbakov (Belarus)

8 October 2008

England	3 – 0	Albania
Drinkwater 7'; Delfouneso 40'; Lansbury 80'	Report

The Showgrounds, Coleraine
Referee: Jiří Jech (Czech Republic)

10 October 2008

Serbia	5 – 0	Albania
Medojević 18'; Ljajić 45+2'; Krstičić 48'; Savić 80', 85'	Report

The Showgrounds, Newry
Referee: Jiří Jech (Czech Republic)

10 October 2008

Northern Ireland	1 – 3	England
Lawrie 3'	Report	Lansbury 25', 40' (pen.); Murphy 84'

Windsor Park, Belfast
Referee: Aleksei Nikolaev (Russia)

13 October 2008

England	1 – 4	Serbia
Moses 28'	Report	Krstičić 8'; Ljajić 19'; Aleksić 38'; Ignjovski 63'

The Showgrounds, Newry
Referee: Aleksei Nikolaev (Russia)

13 October 2008

Albania	1 – 2	Northern Ireland
Balaj 76'	Report	Kee 37'; O'Kane 41'

The Oval, Belfast
Referee: Aleksei Kulbakov (Belarus)

=== Group 10 ===
Team	Pld	W	D	L	GF	GA	GD	Pts
Greece	3	2	0	1	4	2	+2	6
Bosnia and Herzegovina (H)	3	1	2	0	4	3	+1	5
Poland	3	1	1	1	4	5	−1	4
Montenegro	3	0	1	2	1	3	−2	1

(H) Hosts
20 October 2008

Greece	1 – 2	Bosnia and Herzegovina
Papadopoulos 76'	Report	Handzic 20' (pen.); Gadzo 44'

Koševo Stadium, Sarajevo
Referee: Jorge Sousa (Portugal)

20 October 2008

Poland	2 – 1	Montenegro
Zwoliński 45'; Kucharczyk 57'	Report	Olbrich 46' (o.g.)

Grbavica Stadium, Sarajevo
Referee: Daniel Stalhammar (Sweden)

22 October 2008

Greece	1 – 0	Montenegro
Karelis 65'	Report

Grbavica Stadium, Sarajevo
Referee: Sascha Kever (Switzerland)

22 October 2008

Bosnia and Herzegovina	2 – 2	Poland
Handžić 13', 66' (pen.)	Report	Stulin 67' (pen.); Holota 76'

Koševo Stadium, Sarajevo
Referee: Jorge Sousa (Portugal)

25 October 2008

Poland	0 – 2	Greece
	Report	Gentsoglou 73'; Matsoukas 87'

Grbavica Stadium, Sarajevo
Referee: Sascha Kever (Switzerland)

25 October 2008

Montenegro	0 – 0	Bosnia and Herzegovina
	Report

Koševo Stadium, Sarajevo
Referee: Daniel Stalhammar (Sweden)

=== Group 11 ===
Team	Pld	W	D	L	GF	GA	GD	Pts
Turkey (H)	3	3	0	0	9	1	+8	9
Romania	3	2	0	1	6	4	+2	6
Wales	3	1	0	2	8	6	+2	3
Andorra	3	0	0	3	0	12	−12	0

(H) Hosts
10 November 2008

Romania	3 – 2	Wales
Alibec 39'; Bâtfoi 73'; Râpă 81'	Report	Partington 48'; Craig 51'

Mardan Sports Complex, Antalya
Referee: Robert Schörgenhofer (Austria)

10 November 2008

Turkey	4 – 0	Andorra
Ayık 44'; Sözen 51' (pen.); Bagci 71'; Torun 88'	Report

Mardan Sports Complex, Antalya
Referee: Marcin Borski (Poland)

12 November 2008

Andorra	0 – 2	Romania
	Report	Alibec 24'; Alexe 35'

Mardan Sports Complex, Antalya
Referee: George Vadachkoria (Georgia (country))

12 November 2008

Turkey	3 – 0	Wales
Torun 21', 51'; Osmanoğlu 87'	Report

Mardan Sports Complex, Antalya
Referee: Marcin Borski (Poland)

15 November 2008

Romania	1 – 2	Turkey
Alibec 45'	Report	Eylik 17'; Torun 32' (pen.)

Mardan Sports Complex, Antalya
Referee: Robert Schörgenhofer (Austria)

15 November 2008

Wales	6 – 0	Andorra
Orosa 22' (o.g.); Taylor 50'; Roca 65' (o.g.); Brown 67', 81', 90' (pen.)

=== Group 12 ===
Team	Pld	W	D	L	GF	GA	GD	Pts
Portugal (H)	3	2	1	0	6	1	+5	7
Finland	3	2	0	1	5	4	+1	6
Israel	3	1	0	2	4	6	−2	3
Bulgaria	3	0	1	2	3	7	−4	1

(H) Hosts
14 October 2008

Israel	1 – 2	Finland
Ghadir 9'	Report	Mäntylä 17'; Lepola 71'

Estádio Municipal da Marinha Grande, Marinha Grande
Referee: Michail Koukoulakis (Greece)

14 October 2008

Portugal	1 – 1	Bulgaria
Amado 86'	Report	Vasilev 85'

Estádio Municipal de Pombal, Pombal
Referee: Marijo Strahonja (Croatia)

16 October 2008

Israel	3 – 1	Bulgaria
Ghadir 4'; Lotati 17'; Balilti 69'	Report	Vasilev 54'

Estádio Municipal de Nazaré, Nazaré
Referee: Michail Koukoulakis (Greece)

16 October 2008

Finland	0 – 2	Portugal
	Report	Götzl 6' (o.g.); Camará 28'

Estádio Municipal da Marinha Grande, Marinha Grande
Referee: Manuel Gräfe (Germany)

19 October 2008

Portugal	3 – 0	Israel
Fonte 49', 76' (pen.); Simão 85'	Report

Estádio Municipal da Marinha GrandeMarinha Grande
Referee: Manuel Gräfe (Germany)

19 October 2008

Bulgaria	1 – 3	Finland
Toshev 41'	Report	Dalla Valle 20', 24'; Heini 35'

Estádio Municipal de Pombal, Pombal
Referee: Marijo Strahonja (Croatia)

=== Group 13 ===
Team	Pld	W	D	L	GF	GA	GD	Pts
Spain	3	2	0	1	9	2	+7	6
Switzerland	3	2	0	1	6	3	+3	6
Belarus (H)	3	2	0	1	3	5	−2	6
Faroe Islands	3	0	0	3	1	9	−8	0

(H) Hosts
2 October 2008

Spain	5 – 0	Faroe Islands
Aquino 11', 65'; Sielva 14'; Mario 87'; Nacho 90+2'	Report

Traktor Stadium, Minsk
Referee: Siniša Zrnić (Bosnia and Herzegovina)
2 October 2008

Switzerland	1 – 2	Belarus
Wiss 63'	Report	Khlebosolov 71' (pen.); Salavey 77'

City Stadium, Borisov
Referee: Babak Guliyev (Azerbaijan)

4 October 2008

Switzerland	3 – 1	Faroe Islands
Schönbächler 34'; Wüthrich 38'; Mehmedi 69'	Report	K. Olsen 64'

Darida Stadium, Minsk
Referee: Siniša Zrnić (Bosnia and Herzegovina)
4 October 2008

Belarus	0 – 4	Spain
	Report	Mérida 3', 90+1'; Aquino 13'; Rochela 72'

Traktor Stadium, Minsk
Referee: Hannes Kaasik (Estonia)

7 October 2008

Spain	0 – 2	Switzerland
	Report	Zuffi 44'; Büchli 48'

Darida Stadium, Minsk
Referee: Hannes Kaasik (Estonia)
7 October 2008

Faroe Islands	0 – 1	Belarus
	Report	Rushnitsky 56' (pen.)

City Stadium, Borisov
Referee: Babak Guliyev (Azerbaijan)

== Ranking of third-placed teams ==
Ranking includes all matches in the group. Top two, Slovakia and Belarus, advanced to the Elite Round.

Grp	Team	Pld	W	D	L	GF	GA	GD	Pts
5	Slovakia	3	2	0	1	4	3	+1	6
13	Belarus	3	2	0	1	3	5	−2	6
1	Azerbaijan	3	1	1	1	6	2	+4	4
2	Croatia	3	1	1	1	7	6	+1	4
10	Poland	3	1	1	1	4	5	−1	4
8	Macedonia	3	1	1	1	3	6	−3	4
11	Wales	3	1	0	2	8	6	+2	3
12	Israel	3	1	0	2	4	6	−2	3
9	Northern Ireland	3	1	0	2	4	7	−3	3
6	Lithuania	3	1	0	2	4	9	−5	3
3	Italy	3	0	2	1	4	5	−1	2
7	Georgia	3	0	2	1	2	3	−1	2
4	Malta	3	0	1	2	1	6	−5	1

== See also ==
- 2009 UEFA European Under-19 Championship
- 2009 UEFA European Under-19 Championship elite qualification
