= 2010 UEFA European Under-19 Championship squads =

Player listings in youth football competition

Players born on or after 1 January 1991 were eligible to participate in the 2010 UEFA European Under-19 Championship. Players' age as of 18 July 2009 – the tournament's opening day. Players in bold have later been capped at full international level.

== Group A ==
=== Austria ===
Coach: (Austria) Andreas Heraf

No.	Pos.	Player	Date of birth (age)	Caps	Club
1	GK	Philip Petermann			Austria Wien
3	DF	Emir Dilaver			Austria Wien
4	DF	Mahmud Imamoglu			(Austria) First Vienna
5	MF	Michael Schimpelsberger (c)			(Netherlands) Twente
6	FW	Tobias Kainz			(Netherlands) Heerenveen
7	MF	**David Alaba**			(Germany) Bayern Munich
8	MF	Robert Gucher			(Italy) Genoa
9	FW	**Andreas Weimann**			(England) Aston Villa
10	MF	Christoph Knasmüllner			(Germany) Bayern Munich
11	FW	**Marco Djuricin**			(Germany) Hertha BSC
14	MF	Gernot Trauner			(Austria) LASK
15	DF	Lukas Rath			(Austria) SV Mattersburg
17	MF	Georg Teigl			(Austria) Red Bull Salzburg
18	MF	Christian Klem			(Austria) Sturm Graz
19	FW	Andreas Tiffner			Austria Wien
20	FW	Marco Meilinger			(Austria) Red Bull Salzburg
21	GK	Christian Petrovcic			(Austria) DSV Leoben

=== Netherlands ===
Coach: (Netherlands) Wim van Zwam

No.	Pos.	Player	Date of birth (age)	Caps	Club
1	GK	**Jeroen Zoet**	6 January 1991 (aged 19)	5	(Netherlands) PSV
2	DF	**Ricardo van Rhijn**	13 June 1991 (aged 19)	5	(Netherlands) Ajax
3	DF	Imad Najah	19 February 1991 (aged 19)	6	(Netherlands) PSV
4	DF	Erik Schouten	16 August 1991 (aged 18)	0	(Netherlands) AZ
5	DF	**Bruno Martins Indi**	8 February 1992 (aged 18)	3	(Netherlands) Feyenoord
6	MF	**Jordy Clasie**	27 June 1991 (aged 19)	3	(Netherlands) Excelsior
7	FW	Rajiv van La Parra	4 June 1991 (aged 19)	6	(France) Caen
8	MF	**Leandro Bacuna**	21 August 1991 (aged 18)	6	(Netherlands) Groningen
9	FW	Luc Castaignos	27 September 1992 (aged 17)	3	(Netherlands) Feyenoord
10	MF	Ricky van Haaren	21 June 1991 (aged 19)	5	(Netherlands) Feyenoord
11	FW	Jerson Cabral	3 January 1991 (aged 19)	5	(Netherlands) Feyenoord
12	DF	Tim Eekman	5 August 1991 (aged 18)	1	(Netherlands) Excelsior
13	FW	Lorenzo Ebecilio	24 September 1991 (aged 18)	5	(Netherlands) Ajax
15	MF	**Davy Pröpper**	2 September 1991 (aged 18)	4	(Netherlands) Vitesse
16	GK	Steffen Bakker	14 September 1991 (aged 18)	0	(Netherlands) Groningen
17	FW	**Florian Jozefzoon**	9 February 1991 (aged 19)	0	(Netherlands) Ajax
18	MF	Rodney Sneijder	31 March 1991 (aged 19)	0	(Netherlands) Ajax
19	MF	**Steven Berghuis**	19 December 1991 (aged 18)	4	(Netherlands) Twente

=== England ===
Coach: (England) Noel Blake

No.	Pos.	Player	Date of birth (age)	Caps	Club
1	GK	Declan Rudd	16 January 1991 (aged 19)	6	(England) Norwich City
2	DF	**Nathaniel Clyne**	5 April 1991 (aged 19)	5	(England) Crystal Palace
3	DF	**Matthew Briggs**	19 March 1991 (aged 19)	12	(England) Fulham
4	MF	Matty James (c)	22 July 1991 (aged 18)	9	(England) Manchester United
5	DF	**Steven Caulker**	29 December 1991 (aged 18)	7	(England) Tottenham Hotspur
6	DF	Nathan Baker	23 April 1991 (aged 19)	6	(England) Aston Villa
7	MF	Jacob Mellis	8 January 1991 (aged 19)	8	(England) Chelsea
8	MF	Dean Parrett	16 November 1991 (aged 18)	8	(England) Tottenham Hotspur
9	FW	Ryan Noble	11 June 1991 (aged 19)	3	(England) Sunderland
10	FW	Nathan Delfouneso	2 February 1991 (aged 19)	22	(England) Aston Villa
11	FW	Frank Nouble	24 September 1991 (aged 18)	5	(England) West Ham United
12	MF	John Bostock	15 January 1992 (aged 18)	4	(England) Tottenham Hotspur
13	GK	Lee Nicholls	5 October 1992 (aged 17)	0	(England) Wigan Athletic
14	DF	Thomas Cruise	9 March 1991 (aged 19)	3	(England) Arsenal
15	DF	Reece Brown	1 November 1991 (aged 18)	8	(England) Manchester United
16	DF	Josh Thompson	25 February 1991 (aged 19)	2	(Scotland) Celtic
17	FW	**Matt Phillips**	3 March 1991 (aged 19)	2	(England) Wycombe Wanderers
18	FW	Ryan Donaldson	1 May 1991 (aged 19)	7	(England) Newcastle United

=== France ===
Coach: (France) Francis Smerecki

No.	Pos.	Player	Date of birth (age)	Caps	Club
1	GK	Marc Vidal	3 June 1991 (aged 19)	2	(France) Toulouse
2	DF	**Loïc Nego**	15 January 1991 (aged 19)	7	(France) Nantes
3	DF	**Chris Mavinga**	26 May 1991 (aged 19)	11	(England) Liverpool
4	DF	Johan Martial	30 May 1991 (aged 19)	9	(France) Bastia
5	DF	Sébastien Faure	3 January 1991 (aged 19)	5	(France) Lyon
6	MF	**Clément Grenier**	7 January 1991 (aged 19)	10	(France) Lyon
7	MF	**Gaël Kakuta**	21 June 1991 (aged 19)	8	(England) Chelsea
8	MF	Gueïda Fofana (c)	16 May 1991 (aged 19)	9	(France) Le Havre
9	FW	Yannis Tafer	11 February 1991 (aged 19)	11	(France) Lyon
10	FW	**Gilles Sunu**	30 March 1991 (aged 19)	12	(England) Arsenal
11	FW	**Antoine Griezmann**	21 March 1991 (aged 19)	2	(Spain) Real Sociedad
12	FW	**Alexandre Lacazette**	28 May 1991 (aged 19)	5	(France) Lyon
13	MF	Francis Coquelin	13 May 1991 (aged 19)	12	(England) Arsenal
14	DF	Timothée Kolodziejczak	1 October 1991 (aged 18)	6	(France) Lyon
15	MF	Enzo Reale	7 October 1991 (aged 18)	3	(France) Lyon
16	GK	**Abdoulaye Diallo**	30 March 1992 (aged 18)	1	(France) Rennes
17	FW	**Cédric Bakambu**	11 April 1991 (aged 19)	11	(France) Sochaux
18	DF	Gaëtan Bussmann	2 February 1991 (aged 19)	8	(France) Metz

== Group B ==
=== Italy ===
Coach: (Italy) Massimo Piscedda

No.	Pos.	Player	Date of birth (age)	Caps	Club
1	GK	Simone Colombi	1 July 1991 (aged 19)	4	(Italy) Pergocrema
2	DF	Alessandro Crescenzi	25 September 1991 (aged 18)	3	(Italy) Grosseto
3	DF	Michelangelo Albertazzi	7 February 1991 (aged 19)	10	(Italy) Milan
4	MF	**Roberto Soriano**	8 February 1991 (aged 19)	3	(Italy) Empoli
5	DF	Riccardo Brosco	3 February 1991 (aged 19)	3	(Italy) Triestina
6	DF	Luca Caldirola	1 February 1991 (aged 19)	5	(Italy) Internazionale
7	MF	Jacopo Sala	5 December 1991 (aged 18)	6	(England) Chelsea
8	MF	**Andrea Bertolacci**	11 January 1991 (aged 19)	4	(Italy) Lecce
9	FW	**Mattia Destro**	20 March 1991 (aged 19)		(Italy) Internazionale
10	FW	**Fabio Borini** (c)	23 March 1991 (aged 19)	4	(England) Chelsea
11	MF	Cristian Galano	1 April 1991 (aged 19)		(Italy) Bari
12	GK	**Mattia Perin**	10 November 1992 (aged 17)	1	(Italy) Genoa
13	DF	Andrea Adamo	23 April 1991 (aged 19)		(Italy) Palermo
14	MF	Luca Tremolada	25 November 1991 (aged 18)		(Italy) Internazionale
15	DF	Alessandro Malomo	12 April 1991 (aged 19)		(Italy) Roma
16	MF	Federico Capitani	27 March 1991 (aged 19)	6	(Italy) Atalanta B.C.
17	MF	Marco D'Alessandro	17 February 1991 (aged 19)	5	(Italy) Bari
18	FW	Nicolao Dumitru	12 October 1991 (aged 18)		(Italy) Empoli

=== Croatia ===
Coach: (Croatia) Ivica Grnja

No.	Pos.	Player	Date of birth (age)	Caps	Club
1	GK	Matej Delač	20 August 1992 (aged 17)	3	(Croatia) Inter Zaprešić
2	DF	**Šime Vrsaljko**	10 January 1992 (aged 18)	2	(Croatia) Dinamo Zagreb
3	DF	Dario Rugašević	29 January 1991 (aged 19)	13	(Croatia) Cibalia
4	MF	**Franko Andrijašević**	22 June 1991 (aged 19)	14	(Croatia) Hajduk Split
5	DF	Renato Kelić (c)	31 March 1991 (aged 19)	10	(Czech Republic) Slovan Liberec
6	DF	Tomislav Glumac	14 May 1991 (aged 19)	8	(Croatia) Zadar
7	MF	**Arijan Ademi**	29 May 1991 (aged 19)	13	(Croatia) Dinamo Zagreb
8	MF	**Filip Ozobić**	8 April 1991 (aged 19)	11	(Russia) Spartak Moscow
9	FW	**Andrej Kramarić**	11 June 1991 (aged 19)	8	(Croatia) Dinamo Zagreb
10	MF	Mario Tičinović	20 August 1991 (aged 18)	9	(Croatia) Hajduk Split
11	FW	**Ante Vukušić**	4 June 1991 (aged 19)	4	(Croatia) Hajduk Split
12	GK	Dominik Picak	12 February 1992 (aged 18)	4	(Croatia) Lokomotiva
13	DF	Matej Jonjić	29 January 1991 (aged 19)	16	(Croatia) Hajduk Split
14	DF	Roberto Punčec	27 October 1991 (aged 18)	7	(Croatia) Varaždin
15	MF	Zvonko Pamić	4 February 1991 (aged 19)	5	(Germany) SC Freiburg
16	FW	Anton Maglica	11 November 1991 (aged 18)	6	(Croatia) Osijek
17	MF	Marko Bičvić	7 June 1991 (aged 19)	10	(Switzerland) Basel
18	MF	Frano Mlinar	30 March 1992 (aged 18)	4	(Croatia) Dinamo Zagreb

=== Portugal ===
Coach: (Portugal) Ilídio Vale

No.	Pos.	Player	Date of birth (age)	Caps	Goals	Club
1	GK	Tiago Maia	18 September 1992 (aged 17)	11	0	(Portuguese Football Federation) Porto
2	DF	João Amorim	26 July 1992 (aged 17)	11	0	(Portuguese Football Federation) Vitória de Guimarães
3	DF	Aníbal Capela	8 May 1991 (aged 19)	8	0	(Portuguese Football Federation) Braga
4	DF	Nuno Reis	31 January 1991 (aged 19)	27	6	(Portuguese Football Federation) Sporting CP
5	DF	Roderick Miranda (c)	30 March 1991 (aged 19)	19	0	(Portuguese Football Federation) Benfica
6	MF	Agostinho Cá	24 July 1993 (aged 16)	0	0	(Portuguese Football Federation) Sporting CP
7	MF	**Nélson Oliveira**	8 August 1991 (aged 18)	24	8	(Portuguese Football Federation) Rio Ave
8	DF	**Cédric**	31 August 1991 (aged 18)	15	0	(Portuguese Football Federation) Sporting CP
9	FW	**Amido Baldé**	16 May 1991 (aged 19)	13	2	(Portuguese Football Federation) Sporting CP
10	MF	**Lassana Camará**	29 December 1991 (aged 18)	29	2	(Portuguese Football Federation) Benfica
11	FW	Salvador Agra	11 November 1991 (aged 18)	4	4	(Portuguese Football Federation) Varzim
12	GK	**Cláudio Ramos**	16 November 1991 (aged 18)	0	0	(Portuguese Football Federation) Vitória de Guimarães
13	FW	**Evandro Brandão**	7 May 1991 (aged 19)	3	0	(Portuguese Football Federation) Benfica
14	FW	Alex Gonçalves	27 August 1991 (aged 18)	14	4	(Portuguese Football Federation) Porto
15	MF	**Danilo Pereira**	9 September 1991 (aged 18)	14	0	(Portuguese Football Federation) Benfica
16	DF	**Mário Rui**	27 May 1991 (aged 19)	15	0	(Portuguese Football Federation) Benfica
17	MF	**Sérgio Oliveira**	2 June 1992 (aged 18)	10	0	(Portuguese Football Federation) Porto
18	MF	Rúben Pinto	24 April 1992 (aged 18)	10	2	(Portuguese Football Federation) Benfica

=== Spain ===
Coach: (Spain) Luis Milla

No.	Pos.	Player	Date of birth (age)	Caps	Club
1	GK	Álex Sánchez	3 February 1991 (aged 19)	3	(Spain) Barcelona
2	DF	Martín Montoya	14 April 1991 (aged 19)	5	(Spain) Barcelona
3	DF	Carles Planas	4 March 1991 (aged 19)	7	(Spain) Barcelona
4	DF	**Marc Bartra**	15 January 1991 (aged 19)	6	(Spain) Barcelona
5	DF	Jorge Pulido	8 April 1991 (aged 19)	15	(Spain) Atlético Madrid
6	MF	Oriol Romeu	24 September 1991 (aged 18)	6	(Spain) Barcelona
7	MF	Keko (c)	28 December 1991 (aged 18)	5	(Spain) Atlético Madrid
8	MF	**Thiago**	11 April 1991 (aged 19)	6	(Spain) Barcelona
9	FW	**Rodrigo**	6 March 1991 (aged 19)	6	(Spain) Real Madrid
10	MF	**Sergio Canales**	16 February 1991 (aged 19)	6	(Spain) Real Madrid
11	FW	Dani Pacheco	5 January 1991 (aged 19)	7	(England) Liverpool
12	DF	Hugo Mallo	30 November 1991 (aged 18)	2	(Spain) Celta Vigo
13	GK	Aitor Fernández	3 May 1991 (aged 19)	5	(Spain) Athletic Bilbao
14	FW	**Iker Muniain**	19 December 1992 (aged 17)	0	(Spain) Athletic Bilbao
15	DF	Ramiro Mayor	9 May 1991 (aged 19)	3	(Spain) Real Zaragoza
16	MF	Ezequiel Calvente	12 January 1991 (aged 19)	0	(Spain) Real Betis
17	MF	**Koke**	8 January 1992 (aged 18)	0	(Spain) Atlético Madrid
18	FW	Rubén Rochina	23 March 1991 (aged 19)	4	(Spain) Barcelona
