= 2007–08 in Scottish reserve and youth football =

Scottish football tournament

The 2007–08 season was a season of reserve and youth football in Scotland. The season commenced in August 2007.

== Scottish Premier Reserve League ==
Pos	Team	Pld	W	D	L	GF	GA	GD	Pts
1	Celtic (C)	22	15	3	4	56	18	+38	48
2	Inverness Caledonian Thistle	22	14	1	7	50	36	+14	43
3	St Mirren	22	13	3	6	43	26	+17	42
4	Hibernian	22	12	1	9	48	35	+13	37
5	Rangers	22	9	5	8	43	40	+3	32
6	Dundee United	22	9	3	10	42	45	−3	30
7	Kilmarnock	22	8	5	9	39	29	+10	29
8	Heart of Midlothian	22	7	7	8	31	28	+3	28
9	Aberdeen	22	6	8	8	33	37	−4	26
10	Motherwell	22	6	7	9	27	34	−7	25
11	Falkirk	22	6	4	12	25	44	−19	22
12	Gretna (Note: Gretna failed to fulfill their final six fixtures therefore wins of a 3–0 scoreline were awarded to their opponents.)	22	2	3	17	14	59	−45	9

Source: Scottish Premier Reserve League – Historical tables
Rules for classification: 1) points; 2) goal difference; 3) number of goals scored.
(C) Champions

== Scottish Premier under-19 League ==
Pos	Team	Pld	W	D	L	GF	GA	GD	Pts
1	Rangers	22	18	3	1	62	19	+43	57
2	Celtic	22	11	8	3	46	27	+19	41
3	Hibernian	22	11	6	5	44	29	+15	39
4	Motherwell	22	10	7	5	42	34	+8	37
5	Heart of Midlothian	22	10	5	7	33	25	+8	35
6	Aberdeen	22	10	3	9	33	36	−3	33
7	Dundee United	22	8	7	7	31	24	+7	31
8	Falkirk	22	7	5	10	24	28	−4	26
9	Kilmarnock	22	7	5	10	25	43	−18	26
10	St Mirren	22	5	3	14	28	45	−17	18
11	Inverness Caledonian Thistle	22	3	5	14	21	41	−20	14
12	Gretna	22	3	1	18	22	60	−38	10

Source: Scottish Premier under-19 League – Historical tables
Rules for classification: 1) points; 2) goal difference; 3) number of goals scored.

== Youth Cup competitions ==
=== Scottish Youth Cup ===
Final

24 April 2008

Celtic under-19s	1 – 3 (a.e.t.)	Rangers under-19s
Sheridan 61'	Report 1 Report 2	Fleck 90' 120'; Little 96'

Hampden Park, Glasgow
Attendance: 6,045
Referee: William Collum

=== Glasgow Cup ===
7 August 2008

Celtic under-18s	3 – 1	Rangers under-18s
Keatings 13'; Towell 17'; Forrest 22'	Report 1 Report 2	Hutton 13'

Broadwood Stadium, Cumbernauld
Referee: Frank Connor

=== East of Scotland Shield ===
8 May 2008

Hibernian under-19s	3 – 2	Heart of Midlothian under-19s
Byrne	Report	Stewart; Wallace

Easter Road, Edinburgh

(This was the 2006-07 edition which, due to scheduling issues, had been held-over unplayed and was thus completed in 2007-08).

== National teams ==
=== Scotland Under-21 team ===
Date	Venue	Opponents	Score	Competition	Scotland scorer(s)	Report
21 August	Falkirk Stadium, Falkirk (H)	Czech Republic	1–0	Friendly	Steven Naismith	BBC Sport
8 September	Hietalahti Stadium, Vaasa (A)	Finland	2–3	ECQ(6)	Steven Fletcher, Charlie Mulgrew	BBC Sport
12 September	East End Park, Dunfermline (H)	Denmark	0–0	ECQ(6)		BBC Sport
11 October	Easter Road, Edinburgh (H)	Lithuania	3–0	ECQ(6)	Ross McCormack, Charlie Mulgrew, Steven Fletcher	BBC Sport
16 October	Netherlands (A)	Netherlands	0–4	Friendly		BBC Sport
17 November	Nova Gorica (A)	Slovenia	4–0	ECQ(6)	Jamie Hamill, Ross McCormack, Steven Naismith, Steven Fletcher	BBC Sport
5 February	Estadio Municipal, Abrantes (A)	Portugal	1–2	Friendly	Rocco Quinn	BBC Sport
6 February	Estadio Municipal, Cartaxo (N)	Ukraine	2–2	Friendly	Scott Arfield, Ryan Conroy	BBC Sport
26 March	Pittodrie Stadium, Aberdeen (H)	Finland	2–1	ECQ(6)	Steven Naismith, Kevin McDonald	BBC Sport
20 May	Rugby Park, Kilmarnock (H)	Norway	1–4	Friendly	Scott Cuthbert	BBC Sport

Key

- (H) = Home match
- (A) = Away match
- (N) = Neutral venue
- ECQ(6) = European Championship qualifying (Group 6)

=== Scotland Under-19 team ===
Date	Venue	Opponents	Score	Competition	Scotland scorer(s)	Report
8 September	Sparisjods Stadium, Sandgerdi (A)	Iceland	0–3	Friendly		SFA
26 October	Zimbru Stadium, Chişinău (A)	Moldova	0–1	ECQ(11)		UEFA
28 October	District Sport Complex, Orhei (N)	Azerbaijan	0–2	ECQ(11)		UEFA
31 October	District Sport Complex, Orhei (N)	Ukraine	0–1	ECQ(11)		UEFA
1 April	McDiarmid Park, Perth (H)	Denmark	5–1	Friendly	Chris Maguire (2), Jamie Murphy (2), Mark Archdeacon	SFA

Key

- (H) = Home match
- (A) = Away match
- (N) = Neutral venue
- ECQ(11) = European Championship qualifying round (Group 11)

=== Scotland Under-17 team ===
Date	Venue	Opponents	Score	Competition	Scotland scorer(s)	Report
24 August	Arnoldstein (N)	Switzerland	1–2	F	Danny Wilson	
26 August	Wigo-Haus Arena, Feldkirchen (N)	Slovenia	2–1	Friendly	Gordon Smith, Robert McHugh	
28 August	Lind Stadium, Villach (A)	Austria	1–3	Friendly	Danny Wilson	
19 September	Stark's Park, Kirkcaldy (H)	Slovakia	0–4	ECQ(3)		UEFA
21 September	Almondvale Stadium, Livingston (H)	Liechtenstein	8–0	ECQ(3)	Sean Fitzharris (2), David Love (2), Gordon Smith (2), Robert McHugh, Claudio Beck (o.g.)	UEFA
24 September	Broadwood Stadium, Cumbernauld (H)	Belarus	5–1	ECQ(3)	Archie Campbell (3), Gordon Smith, Sean Fitzharris	UEFA
17 March	The Oval, Belfast (A)	Northern Ireland	3–1	ECQE(5)	John Fleck (2, 1 pen.), Robert McHugh	UEFA
19 March	The Showgrounds, Newry (N)	Wales	1–0	ECQE(5)	Archie Campbell	UEFA
22 March	The Showgrounds, Newry (N)	Slovenia	1–0	ECQE(5)	John Fleck	UEFA
4 May	WOW Football Stadium, Antalya (N)	Serbia	0–2	EC(A)		UEFA
7 May	Mardan Sport Complex, Antalya (N)	Turkey	0–1	EC(A)		UEFA
10 May	Mardan Sport Complex, Antalya (N)	Netherlands	0–2	EC(A)		UEFA

Key

- (H) = Home match
- (A) = Away match
- (N) = Neutral venue
- ECQ(3) = European Championship qualifying round (Group 3)
- ECQE(5) = European Championship qualifying elite round (Group 5)
- EC(A) = European Championship (Group A)
