= 2008–09 in Scottish reserve and youth football =

The 2008–09 season was a season of reserve and youth football in Scotland. The season commenced in August 2008.

== Scottish Premier Reserve League ==
Pos	Team	Pld	W	D	L	GF	GA	GD	Pts
1	Celtic (C)	22	16	4	2	49	17	+32	52
2	Heart of Midlothian	22	12	7	3	44	22	+22	43
3	Rangers	22	12	6	4	39	21	+18	42
4	St Mirren	22	10	3	9	29	31	−2	33
5	Aberdeen	22	9	4	9	23	30	−7	31
6	Motherwell	22	8	6	8	36	30	+6	30
7	Kilmarnock	22	8	4	10	24	29	−5	28
8	Hibernian	22	8	4	10	24	29	−5	28
9	Dundee United	22	8	3	11	25	30	−5	27
10	Inverness Caledonian Thistle	22	5	5	12	28	40	−12	20
11	Falkirk	22	5	5	12	18	36	−18	20
12	Hamilton Academical	22	4	3	15	24	47	−23	15

Source: Scottish Premier Reserve League – Historical tables
Rules for classification: 1) points; 2) goal difference; 3) number of goals scored.
(C) Champions

== Scottish Premier under-19 League ==
Pos	Team	Pld	W	D	L	GF	GA	GD	Pts
1	Hibernian (C)	22	14	6	2	44	17	+27	48
2	Heart of Midlothian	22	14	2	6	52	24	+28	44
3	Rangers	22	13	4	5	35	17	+18	43
4	Motherwell	22	11	4	7	40	20	+20	37
5	Falkirk	22	11	3	8	25	24	+1	36
6	Celtic	22	9	7	6	24	21	+3	34
7	Aberdeen	22	9	6	7	32	24	+8	33
8	Kilmarnock	22	7	3	12	24	38	−14	24
9	Inverness Caledonian Thistle	22	7	3	12	29	46	−17	24
10	St Mirren	22	5	7	10	20	35	−15	22
11	Dundee United	22	4	5	13	17	32	−15	17
12	Hamilton Academical	22	2	2	18	13	57	−44	8

Source: Scottish Premier under-19 League – Historical tables
Rules for classification: 1) points; 2) goal difference; 3) number of goals scored.
(C) Champions

== Youth Cup competitions ==
=== Scottish Youth Cup ===
Final

29 April 2009

Rangers under-19s	1 – 2 (a.e.t.)	Hibernian under-19s
Campbell 48'	Report	Byrne 32' 120'

Hampden Park, Glasgow
Attendance: 4,205
Referee: E. Norris

=== East of Scotland shield ===
20 May 2009

Heart of Midlothian under-19s	1 – 1 (7 – 8 pen.)	Hibernian under-19s
Robinson 90+'	Report	Byrne 73'

Tynecastle Stadium, Edinburgh
Attendance: 598
Referee: P Reid

== National teams ==
=== Scotland Under-21 team ===
Date	Venue	Opponents	Score	Competition	Scotland scorer(s)	Report
20 August	Sūduva Stadium, Marijampolė (A)	Lithuania	3–0	ECQ(6)	Scott Arfield, Ross McCormack, Kevin McDonald	BBC Sport
4 September	Falkirk Stadium, Falkirk (H)	Slovenia	3–1	ECQ(6)	Steven Fletcher (2), Garry Kenneth	BBC Sport
9 September	Aalborg Stadion, Aalborg (A)	Denmark	0–1	ECQ(6)		BBC Sport
18 November	New Douglas Park, Hamilton (H)	Northern Ireland	1–3	Friendly	Jamie Murphy	BBC Sport
28 March	Ruzhdi Bizhuta Stadium, Elbasani (A)	Albania	0–1	ECQ(10)	Chris Maguire	BBC Sport
1 April	Falkirk Stadium, Falkirk (H)	Albania	5–2	ECQ(10)	David Goodwillie, Chris Maguire, Andrew Shinnie, Jamie Murphy, Stephen McGinn	BBC Sport

=== Scotland Under-19 team ===
Date	Venue	Opponents	Score	Competition	Scotland scorer(s)	Report
20 October	Tiszaújváros Stadion, Tiszaújváros (N)	Azerbaijan	1–1	ECQ(1)	Alex MacDonald	UEFA
22 October	Tiszaújváros Stadion, Tiszaújváros (N)	San Marino	8–0	ECQ(1)	Stephen Stirling (3, 2 pens.), Alex MacDonald (2), Johnny Russell (2), Leigh Griffiths	UEFA
25 October	Városi Stadion, Nyíregyháza (A)	Hungary	1–0	ECQ(1)	Stephen Stirling	UEFA

=== Scotland Under-17 team ===
Date	Venue	Opponents	Score	Competition	Scotland scorer(s)	Report
26 September	Stade du Hameau, Pau (N)	San Marino	3–0	ECQ(11)	Ryan Jack, Gordon Dick, James Keatings	UEFA
28 September	Saint Pée, Oloron-Sainte-Marie, (N)	Slovakia	3–1	ECQ(11)	Gordon Dick (2), Ryan Jack	UEFA
1 October	Stade du Hameau, Pau (A)	France	2–3	ECQ(11)	Gordon Dick, Callum McRobbie (pen.)	UEFA
