= Michelangelo Albertazzi =

Italian footballer (born 1991)

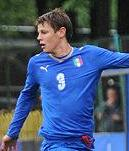

Personal information
- Full name: Michelangelo Albertazzi
- Date of birth: 7 January 1991 (age 35)
- Place of birth: Bologna, Italy
- Height: 1.87 m (6 ft 2 in)
- Positions: Center back; left back

Youth career
- Bologna
- 2008–2011: AC Milan

Senior career*
Years	Team	Apps	(Gls)
2011–2014	AC Milan	0	(0)
2011–2012	→ Getafe (loan)	0	(0)
2012	→ Varese (loan)	2	(0)
2012–2013	→ Hellas Verona (loan)	11	(1)
2013–2014	Hellas Verona	15	(0)
2014–2015	AC Milan	0	(0)
2015–2017	Hellas Verona	10	(0)
2018–2019	Livorno	4	(0)

International career
2006	Italy U16	7	(0)
2006–2008	Italy U17	27	(3)
2008–2010	Italy U19	17	(0)
2008–2011	Italy U20	18	(2)
Medal record
Representing Italy
Men's Football
Mediterranean Games
Silver medal – second place	2009 Pescara	Team competition
- * Club domestic league appearances and goals as of 1 August 2019

Michelangelo Albertazzi (born 7 January 1991) is an Italian professional footballer who plays as a defender.

== Club career ==
=== Early career ===
Born in Bologna, Emilia-Romagna region, Albertazzi started his career at Bologna F.C. 1909. On 30 August 2007 Albertazzi was sold to A.C. Milan in a co-ownership deal worth €1 million. He was loaned back to Bologna until January 2008. In June 2008 Milan bought Albertazzi outright for another €1 million. Despite his young age, Albertazzi had already played for Bologna in the "Primavera" under-20 reserve league in 2006–07 season. Albertazzi also won the "Primavera" Italian Cup with Milan in 2010. He was also loaned back to Milan's under-18 team for the finals of 2009 Campionato Nazionale Dante Berretti, where Milan was the champion of the wild card group. Milan's "Primavera" team (U19) failed to qualify for the playoffs round that season, but the "Berretti" U17 team did. The coach used the majority of the "Primavera" U19 team (such as reserve keeper Miśkiewicz, Romagnoli, Oduamadi and Strasser, all born in 1989 or 1990) to beat Juventus' "Berretti" U17 team 2–1 (with only two born 1990 and the rest of the squad born 1991). A.C. Milan Primavera was eliminated by Sampdoria in the quarter-finals in 2010, and by Roma in the quarter-finals in 2011.

=== AC Milan and loans ===
Albertazzi left for Spanish club Getafe in June 2011. However, he did not play any games. On 31 January 2012 Albertazzi returned to Italy for Serie B club A.S. Varese 1910. Albertazzi failed to make a debut in the first 3 months. Instead, he played 5 games for the reserves as an over-age player (at most 4 born 1991 players were allowed). Near the end of season both the first team and the reserves were aiming for promotion and the title respectively, at which point Albertazzi returned to the first team. Albertazzi made his Serie B debut on 1 May 2012 as starting defender, beating A.S.G. Nocerina 2–0. The team also rested a number of players in order to prepare for the next match against eighth placed Brescia. On the same day that the first team played against Brescia, Albertazzi started for the reserves against Fiorentina in the second round of the playoffs on 5 May 2012. Albertazzi returned to the first team again on 2 June, for the away match of the promotion playoffs. He was named in the reserve squad for the playoffs quarterfinals held in the Province of Perugia, but did not travel with the team. He remained in the first team squad (for the finals first leg only) after the reserves were eliminated by Roma, but Albertazzi failed to make the starting lineup or the bench.

=== Hellas Verona ===
Albertazzi returned to Milan at the beginning of the 2012–13 season, being also named in 23-man squad for the pre-season TIM Trophy. However, on 31 July 2012 he was loaned to Serie B club Hellas Verona. Albertazzi was injured in his left knee from January to February 2013. Half of his registration rights, however, were purchased on 12 July 2013, for €250,000.

On 20 June 2014, Albertazzi returned to Milan after his full rights were acquired by the club.

On 30 July 2015, Albertazzi joined Hellas Verona on a free transfer.

In the 2015–16 Serie A season he made 10 appearances for the club. In August 2016, he sustained an anterior cruciate ligament injury that was not diagnosed in a timely manner and eventually left him out of play for the two consecutive seasons. In 2017, he took a legal action against Hellas Verona citing medical negligence and deliberate refusal to reintegrate him into the squad as causes for the early contract termination and won the court case. The verdict also included his former club paying him €144,000 as a compensation (which was the equivalent of his yearly salary).

=== Livorno ===
On 3 August 2018, Albertazzi joined Serie B club Livorno. Two days later, he made his debut for the club, playing the entire 120-minute Coppa Italia game against Casertana and scoring in the penalty shootout. However, having made only 6 appearances for the club (the last of which was on 31 October 2018), he left the club as a free agent at the end of season.

== International career ==
Albertazzi played for Italy from U16 to U20 level. He started his career in 2005 Christmas Youth Event (Italian: Torneo Giovanile di Natale).

=== U17 ===
Albertazzi entered born 1989 squad instead of 1991 squad, in which he played all three matches in 2006 UEFA European Under-17 Football Championship elite qualification. He played all 3 matches in the qualification of 2007 edition and played all 3 matches of the elite qualification. Albertazzi played 3 times and scored 2 goals in the qualification of 2008 edition and all three matches in the elite round in March 2008. Between the qualification and elite round of 2007–08 season, Albertazzi also received a call-up to the 2008 Minsk under-17 International Tournament. Albertazzi played all matches and won the award for best left-back of the tournament

=== U19 ===
Albertazzi immediately entered the Italy national under-19 football team in 2008–09 season, skipping the U18 team. Albertazzi already played twice in 2008 UEFA European Under-19 Football Championship elite qualification in May 2008. He also played 3 times in 2008 UEFA European Under-19 Football Championship.

He played for the team in friendlies to prepare for 2009 UEFA European Under-19 Football Championship qualification, and won the silver medal in the U-19 European Championship 2009 in Checz Republic In the rest of the season he played for Italy national under-20 football team instead, after Italy was eliminated in the qualification. Albertazzi returned to U19 team in 2009–10 season, rejoining other born 1991 players. Albertazzi played twice in 2010 UEFA European Under-19 Football Championship qualification. He also played all the matches in the next round and two in the final tournament. He was sent off in the second match.

=== U20 ===
Albertazzi played all 5 matches for Italy in 2009 FIFA U-20 World Cup in September–October. He also played all 4 matches in 2009 Mediterranean Games in June to prepare for the World Youth Cup.
