= 2007 UEFA European Under-17 Championship qualifying round =

Football tournament qualification stage

The UEFA U-17 Championship 2007 qualifying round was the first round of qualifications for the main tournament of the 2007 UEFA European Under-17 Championship. The top two teams from each group and the best third-placed team entered the 2007 UEFA European Under-17 Championship elite round.

== Matches ==
=== Group 1 ===
Team	Pld	W	D	L	GF	GA	GD	Pts
Ukraine	3	3	0	0	12	1	+11	9
Belarus	3	1	1	1	8	5	+3	4
Kazakhstan	3	1	1	1	5	3	+2	4
San Marino	3	0	0	3	0	16	−16	0

26 September	Belarus	1–1	Kazakhstan
	Ukraine	6–0	San Marino
28 September	Belarus	6–0	San Marino
	Kazakhstan	0–2	Ukraine
1 October	Ukraine	4–1	Belarus
	San Marino	0–4	Kazakhstan

=== Group 2 ===
Team	Pld	W	D	L	GF	GA	GD	Pts
Turkey	3	2	1	0	8	3	+5	7
Czech Republic	3	1	1	1	3	3	0	4
Luxembourg	3	0	2	1	1	3	−2	2
Slovenia	3	0	2	1	1	4	−3	2

19 September	Czech Republic	2–0	Luxembourg
	Turkey	4–1	Slovenia
21 September	Czech Republic	0–0	Slovenia
	Luxembourg	1–1	Turkey
24 September	Turkey	3–1	Czech Republic
	Slovenia	0–0	Luxembourg

=== Group 3 ===
Team	Pld	W	D	L	GF	GA	GD	Pts
France	3	3	0	0	10	3	+7	9
Iceland	3	1	1	1	6	5	+1	4
Romania	3	1	1	1	4	4	0	4
Lithuania	3	0	0	3	3	11	−8	0

25 September	France	4–2	Lithuania
	Romania	1–1	Iceland
27 September	France	3–1	Iceland
	Lithuania	0–3	Romania
30 September	Romania	0–3	France
	Iceland	4–1	Lithuania

=== Group 4 ===
Team	Pld	W	D	L	GF	GA	GD	Pts
Italy	3	2	1	0	8	0	+8	7
Serbia	3	2	1	0	6	0	+6	7
Malta	3	1	0	2	1	6	−5	3
Andorra	3	0	0	3	0	9	−9	0

17 November	Serbia	2–0	Malta
	Italy	4–0	Andorra
19 November	Andorra	0–4	Serbia
	Italy	4–0	Malta
22 November	Serbia	0–0	Italy
	Malta	1–0	Andorra

=== Group 5 ===
Team	Pld	W	D	L	GF	GA	GD	Pts
Germany	3	3	0	0	11	2	+9	9
Russia	3	2	0	1	9	6	+3	6
Georgia	3	1	0	2	6	3	+3	3
Macedonia	3	0	0	3	3	18	−15	0

13 October	Germany	7–1	Macedonia
	Russia	2–1	Georgia
15 October	Macedonia	2–6	Russia
	Germany	1–0	Georgia
17 October	Russia	1–3	Germany
	Georgia	5–0	Macedonia

=== Group 6 ===
Team	Pld	W	D	L	GF	GA	GD	Pts
Republic of Ireland	3	2	1	0	4	0	+4	7
Azerbaijan	3	1	1	1	2	3	−1	4
Denmark	3	0	3	0	2	2	0	3
Latvia	3	0	1	2	3	6	−3	1

23 September	Azerbaijan	2–1	Latvia
	Denmark	0–0	Republic of Ireland
25 September	Azerbaijan	0–2	Republic of Ireland
	Latvia	2–2	Denmark
28 September	Denmark	0–0	Azerbaijan
	Republic of Ireland	2–0	Latvia

=== Group 7 ===
Team	Pld	W	D	L	GF	GA	GD	Pts
Greece	3	2	0	1	6	4	+2	6
Sweden	3	1	2	0	5	3	+2	5
Austria	3	1	1	1	13	4	+9	4
Liechtenstein	3	0	1	2	2	15	−13	1

15 September	Austria	2–2	Sweden
	Greece	4–1	Liechtenstein
17 September	Austria	10–0	Liechtenstein
	Sweden	2–0	Greece
20 September	Greece	2–1	Austria
	Liechtenstein	1–1	Sweden

=== Group 8 ===
Team	Pld	W	D	L	GF	GA	GD	Pts
Netherlands	3	3	0	0	11	2	+9	9
Norway	3	2	0	1	10	2	+8	6
Croatia	3	1	0	2	8	11	−3	3
Estonia	3	0	0	3	3	17	−14	0

25 October	Netherlands	5–1	Estonia
	Croatia	0–5	Norway
27 October	Norway	0–1	Netherlands
	Croatia	7–1	Estonia
30 October	Netherlands	5–1	Croatia
	Estonia	1–5	Norway

=== Group 9 ===
Team	Pld	W	D	L	GF	GA	GD	Pts
Poland	3	3	0	0	7	0	+7	9
Finland	3	1	1	1	5	4	+1	4
Israel	3	0	2	1	2	5	−3	2
Albania	3	0	1	2	2	7	−5	1

15 October 2006
13:00 (CET) / 14:00 (local)

Israel	0–3	Poland
	Report	Trznadel 4'; Szafran 82'; S-Latef 82'

Jomala Vikingavallen, Jomala, Åland
Referee: Hannes Kaasik (Estonia)

17 October 2006
17:30 (CET) / 18:30 (local)

Poland	2–0	Finland
Stulin 19'; Janota 50'	Report

Wiklöf Holding Arena, Mariehamn, Åland

20 October 2006
13:00 (CET) / 14:00 (local)

Albania	0–2	Poland
	Report	Blacha 42', 83'

Markusbolen, Finström, Åland
Referee: Hannes Kaasik (Estonia)

15 October	Finland	4–1	Albania
17 October	Israel	1–1	Albania
20 October	Finland	1–1	Israel

=== Group 10 ===
Team	Pld	W	D	L	GF	GA	GD	Pts
Hungary	3	2	1	0	5	2	+3	7
Scotland	3	1	2	0	2	1	+1	5
Armenia	3	1	1	1	4	3	+1	4
Bulgaria	3	0	0	3	3	8	−5	0

30 September	Scotland	0–0	Armenia
	Hungary	3–1	Bulgaria
2 October	Hungary	1–0	Armenia
	Bulgaria	0–1	Scotland
5 October	Armenia	4–2	Bulgaria
	Scotland	1–1	Hungary

=== Group 11 ===
Team	Pld	W	D	L	GF	GA	GD	Pts
Slovakia	3	2	0	1	5	3	+2	6
Bosnia and Herzegovina	3	2	0	1	5	3	+2	6
Wales	3	2	0	1	4	3	+1	6
Moldova	3	0	0	3	1	6	−5	0

16 September	Wales	0–2	Bosnia and Herzegovina
	Slovakia	2–0	Moldova
18 September	Wales	2–0	Moldova
	Bosnia and Herzegovina	1–2	Slovakia
21 September	Slovakia	1–2	Wales
	Moldova	1–2	Bosnia and Herzegovina

=== Group 12 ===
Team	Pld	W	D	L	GF	GA	GD	Pts
Northern Ireland	3	3	0	0	5	0	+5	9
Switzerland	3	2	0	1	3	1	+2	6
Faroe Islands	3	0	1	2	1	3	−2	1
Cyprus	3	0	1	2	1	6	−5	1

19 October	Switzerland	1–0	Faroe Islands
	Northern Ireland	3–0	Cyprus
21 October	Cyprus	0–2	Switzerland
	Northern Ireland	1–0	Faroe Islands
24 October	Switzerland	0–1	Northern Ireland
	Faroe Islands	1–1	Cyprus

== 3rd place table ==
The best third-placed team was determined by the results against the top two teams of the same group.

Grp	Team	Pld	W	D	L	GF	GA	GD	Pts
11	Wales	2	1	0	1	2	3	−1	3
6	Denmark	2	0	2	0	0	0	0	2
7	Austria	2	0	1	1	3	4	−1	1
10	Armenia	2	0	1	1	0	1	−1	1
1	Kazakhstan	2	0	1	1	1	3	−2	1
2	Luxembourg	2	0	1	1	1	3	−2	1
9	Israel	2	0	1	1	1	4	−3	1
3	Romania	2	0	1	1	1	4	−3	1
5	Georgia	2	0	0	2	1	3	−2	0
12	Faroe Islands	2	0	0	2	0	2	−2	0
4	Malta	2	0	0	2	0	6	−6	0
8	Croatia	2	0	0	2	1	10	−9	0

England/Spain/Portugal bye this round, Belgium as host, elite round bye.
