= 2007 UEFA European Under-17 Championship elite round =

Association football tournament

The UEFA U-17 Championship 2007 elite round was the second round of qualifications for the main tournament of 2007 UEFA European Under-17 Championship. England, Spain and Portugal automatically qualified for this round. The winners of each group joined hosts Belgium at the main tournament.

== Group 1 ==
| Teams | GP | W | D | L | GF | GA | GD | Pts |
|---|---|---|---|---|---|---|---|---|
| Germany | 3 | 3 | 0 | 0 | 11 | 2 | +9 | 9 |
| Republic of Ireland | 3 | 2 | 0 | 1 | 3 | 4 | −1 | 6 |
| Scotland | 3 | 0 | 1 | 2 | 2 | 6 | −4 | 1 |
| Greece | 3 | 0 | 1 | 2 | 1 | 5 | −4 | 1 |

| 21 March | Germany | 4–1 | Greece |
| | Republic of Ireland | 2–1 | Scotland |
| 23 March | Germany | 4–1 | Scotland |
| | Greece | 0–1 | Republic of Ireland |
| 26 March | Republic of Ireland | 0–3 | Germany |
| | Scotland | 0–0 | Greece |

== Group 2 ==
| Teams | GP | W | D | L | GF | GA | GD | Pts |
|---|---|---|---|---|---|---|---|---|
| Ukraine | 3 | 3 | 0 | 0 | 8 | 2 | +6 | 9 |
| Italy | 3 | 2 | 0 | 1 | 4 | 2 | +2 | 6 |
| Czech Republic | 3 | 1 | 0 | 2 | 6 | 7 | −1 | 3 |
| Slovakia | 3 | 0 | 0 | 3 | 0 | 7 | −7 | 0 |

| 24 March | Ukraine | 2–0 | Slovakia |
| | Italy | 2–1 | Czech Republic |
| 26 March | Ukraine | 5–2 | Czech Republic |
| | Slovakia | 0–2 | Italy |
| 29 March | Italy | 0–1 | Ukraine |
| | Czech Republic | 3–0 | Slovakia |

== Group 3 ==
| Teams | GP | W | D | L | GF | GA | GD | Pts |
|---|---|---|---|---|---|---|---|---|
| England | 3 | 3 | 0 | 0 | 8 | 1 | +7 | 9 |
| Serbia | 3 | 2 | 0 | 1 | 8 | 3 | +5 | 6 |
| Azerbaijan | 3 | 1 | 0 | 2 | 2 | 6 | −4 | 3 |
| Bosnia and Herzegovina | 3 | 0 | 0 | 3 | 0 | 8 | −8 | 0 |

| 23 March | England | 5–0 | Bosnia and Herzegovina |
| | Serbia | 5–1 | Azerbaijan |
| 25 March | England | 1–0 | Azerbaijan |
| | Bosnia and Herzegovina | 0–2 | Serbia |
| 28 March | Serbia | 1–2 | England |
| | Azerbaijan | 1–0 | Bosnia and Herzegovina |

== Group 4 ==
| Teams | GP | W | D | L | GF | GA | GD | Pts |
|---|---|---|---|---|---|---|---|---|
| Netherlands | 3 | 3 | 0 | 0 | 7 | 0 | +7 | 9 |
| Belarus | 3 | 2 | 0 | 1 | 4 | 5 | −1 | 6 |
| Turkey | 3 | 1 | 0 | 2 | 3 | 2 | +1 | 3 |
| Wales | 3 | 0 | 0 | 3 | 0 | 7 | −7 | 0 |

| 20 March | Netherlands | 1–0 | Wales |
| | Turkey | 0–1 | Belarus |
| 22 March | Netherlands | 5–0 | Belarus |
| | Wales | 0–3 | Turkey |
| 25 March | Turkey | 0–1 | Netherlands |
| | Belarus | 3–0 | Wales |

== Group 5 ==
| Teams | GP | W | D | L | GF | GA | GD | Pts |
|---|---|---|---|---|---|---|---|---|
| France | 3 | 2 | 1 | 0 | 5 | 1 | +4 | 7 |
| Norway | 3 | 1 | 1 | 1 | 3 | 4 | −1 | 4 |
| Hungary | 3 | 1 | 1 | 1 | 3 | 3 | ±0 | 4 |
| Finland | 3 | 0 | 1 | 2 | 5 | 8 | −3 | 1 |

| 26 March | France | 2–0 | Norway |
| | Hungary | 3–2 | Finland |
| 28 March | France | 3–1 | Finland |
| | Norway | 1–0 | Hungary |
| 31 March | Hungary | 0–0 | France |
| | Finland | 2–2 | Norway |

== Group 6 ==
| Teams | GP | W | D | L | GF | GA | GD | Pts |
|---|---|---|---|---|---|---|---|---|
| Iceland | 3 | 1 | 2 | 0 | 8 | 7 | +1 | 5 |
| Portugal | 3 | 1 | 2 | 0 | 2 | 1 | +1 | 5 |
| Russia | 3 | 1 | 1 | 1 | 8 | 7 | +1 | 4 |
| Northern Ireland | 3 | 0 | 1 | 2 | 4 | 7 | −3 | 1 |

| 19 March | Portugal | 0–0 | Russia |
| | Northern Ireland | 2–2 | Iceland |
| 21 March | Portugal | 0–0 | Iceland |
| | Russia | 3–1 | Northern Ireland |
| 24 March | Northern Ireland | 1–2 | Portugal |
| | Iceland | 6–5 | Russia |

== Group 7 ==
| Teams | GP | W | D | L | GF | GA | GD | Pts |
|---|---|---|---|---|---|---|---|---|
| Spain | 3 | 3 | 0 | 0 | 5 | 1 | +4 | 9 |
| Switzerland | 3 | 2 | 0 | 1 | 5 | 2 | +3 | 6 |
| Poland | 3 | 1 | 0 | 2 | 3 | 4 | −1 | 3 |
| Sweden | 3 | 0 | 0 | 3 | 3 | 9 | −6 | 0 |

26 March 2007

| Poland | 3–1 | Sweden |
|---|---|---|
| Blacha 11'; Kupisz 43'; Trznadel 74' | Report | Ajdarevic 63' (pen.) |

Municipal de Deportes Francisco Bonet, Almuñécar
Referee: Ante Vucemilović-Simunović (Croatia)

28 March 2007

| Switzerland | 2–0 | Poland |
|---|---|---|
| Berisha 15'; Lalombongo 38' | Report |

Municipal de Deportes Francisco Bonet, Almuñécar

31 March 2007

| Poland | 0–1 | Spain |
|---|---|---|
| | Report | Pichu 34' |

Municipal de Deportes Francisco Bonet, Almuñécar
Referee: Bas Nijhuis (Netherlands)

| 26 March | Spain | 1–0 | Switzerland |
| 28 March | Spain | 3–1 | Sweden |
| 31 March | Sweden | 1–3 | Switzerland |
