= 2009 UEFA European Under-21 Championship qualification Group 6 =

Football tournament qualification stage

The teams competing in group 6 of the 2009 UEFA European Under-21 Championships qualifying competition are Denmark, Finland, Lithuania, Scotland and Slovenia.

== Standings ==
Team	Pld	W	D	L	GF	GA	GD	Pts
Finland	8	6	1	1	11	6	+5	19
Denmark	8	5	1	2	13	4	+9	16
Scotland	8	5	1	2	17	6	+11	16
Slovenia	8	1	2	5	4	14	−9	5
Lithuania	8	0	1	7	2	18	−16	1

Key: Pts Points, Pld Matches played, W Won, D Drawn, L Lost, GF Goals for, GA Goals against, GD Goal Difference

== Matches ==
5 June 2007
20:15 UTC+2

Slovenia	2 – 1	Lithuania
Mihelič 57'; Matavž 60'	Report	Galkevicius 74'

Sports Park, Domžale
Referee: Alexandru Deaconu (Romania)
6 June 2007
18:15 UTC+2

Denmark	0 – 1	Finland
	Report	Sparv 45'

Energi Nord Arena, Aalborg
Referee: Paolo Tagliavento (Italy)

7 September 2007
18:15 UTC+2

Denmark	4 – 0	Lithuania
Storm 29'; Jakobsen 38'; Damborg 85'; Christensen 90+3'	Report

Energi Nord Arena, Aalborg
Referee: Siarhei Shmolik (Belarus)
8 September 2007
17:00 UTC+3

Finland	3 – 2	Scotland
Sadik 23'; Petrescu 49'; Jalasto 89'	Report	Fletcher 45+2'; Mulgrew 80'

Hietalahti Stadium, Vaasa
Referee: Alexander Gonchar (Russia)

11 September 2007
17:00 UTC+3

Lithuania	0 – 0	Slovenia
	Report

Sūduva stadium, Marijampolė
Referee: Akmalkhan Kholmatov (Kazakhstan)
12 September 2007
17:15 UTC+1

Scotland	0 – 0	Denmark
	Report

East End Park, Dunfermline
Referee: César Muñiz Fernández (Spain)

11 October 2007
19:45 UTC+1

Scotland	3 – 0	Lithuania
McCormack 45'; Mulgrew 45+1'; Fletcher 58'	Report

Easter Road, Edinburgh
Referee: Damien Ledentu (France)
13 October 2007
17:00 UTC+3

Finland	1 – 0	Slovenia
Sparv 8' (pen.)	Report

Lahden Stadion, Lahti
Referee: Robert Schörgenhofer (Austria)

16 October 2007
18:00 UTC+2

Slovenia	1 – 3	Denmark
Lovrečič 5' (pen.)	Report	Troest 33'; Christensen 63'; Pedersen 66'

Sports Park, Domžale
Referee: Andriy Shandor (Ukraine)
17 October 2007
18:00 UTC+3

Lithuania	0 – 1	Finland
	Report	Sparv 4'

S. Darius and S. Girėnas Stadium, Kaunas
Referee: Anthony Buttimer (Republic of Ireland)

16 November 2007
14:00 UTC+2

Lithuania	0 – 3	Denmark
	Report	Schøne 8'; Pedersen 83'; Christensen 90'

Vėtra Stadium, Vilnius
Referee: Dragomir Stanković (Serbia)
17 November 2007
14:30 UTC+1

Slovenia	0 – 4	Scotland
	Report	Hamill 33'; McCormack 51'; Naismith 56' (pen.); Fletcher 61'

Stadion Športni Park, Nova Gorica
Referee: Markus Strömbergsson (Sweden)

20 November 2007
18:15 UTC+1

Denmark	1 – 0	Slovenia
Jakobsen 90+2' (pen.)	Report

Energi Nord Arena, Aalborg
Referee: Aleksei Nikolaev (Russia)
21 November 2007
18:30 UTC+2

Finland	2 – 1	Lithuania
Hetemaj 20'; Parikka 33'	Report	Grigaitis 26'

Finnair Stadium, Helsinki
Referee: Mark Whitby (Wales)

26 March 2008
17:30 UTC+0

Scotland	2 – 1	Finland
Naismith 29'; McDonald 83'	Report	Hämäläinen 40'

Pittodrie Stadium, Aberdeen
Referee: Ante Vučemilović-Šimunović Jr. (Croatia)

20 August 2008
17:00 UTC+3

Lithuania	0 – 3	Scotland
	Report	Arfield 4'; McCormack 39'; McDonald 60'

Sūduva stadium, Marijampolė
Referee: Tsvetan Georgiev (Bulgaria)

4 September 2008
19:45 UTC+1

Scotland	3 – 1	Slovenia
Fletcher 1', 63'; Kenneth 42'	Report	Matavž 54'

Falkirk Stadium, Falkirk
Referee: Andrejs Sipailo (Latvia)
5 September 2008
19:00 UTC+3

Finland	2 – 1	Denmark
Hetemaj 32'; Petrescu 47'	Report	Troest 80'

Veritas Stadion, Turku
Referee: Olivier Thual (France)

9 September 2008
19:00 UTC+2

Slovenia	0 – 0	Finland
	Report

Ob Jezeru, Velenje
Referee: Cyril Zimmermann (Switzerland)
9 September 2008
19:00 UTC+2

Denmark	1 – 0	Scotland
Pedersen 28'	Report

Energi Nord Arena, Aalborg
Referee: Sergiy Berezka (Ukraine)

== Goalscorers ==
Rank	Player	Country	Goals
1	Martin Christensen	Denmark	3
1	Steven Fletcher	Scotland	3
1	Nicklas Pedersen	Denmark	3
1	Tim Sparv	Finland	3
4	Mehmet Hetemaj	Finland	2
4	Michael Jakobsen	Denmark	2
4	Ross McCormack	Scotland	2
4	Charles Mulgrew	Scotland	2
4	Steven Naismith	Scotland	2
4	Tomi Petrescu	Finland	2
4	Magnus Troest	Denmark	2
4	Tim Matavž	Slovenia	2

- 1 goal:

Denmark: Jonas Damborg, Lasse Schøne, Bo Storm
Finland: Kasper Hämäläinen, Ville Jalasto, Jarno Parikka, Berat Sadik
Lithuania: Dominykas Galkevicius, Evaldas Grigaitis
Scotland: Jamie Hamill, Kevin McDonald
Slovenia: Anej Lovrečič, Rene Mihelič
