= Filip Moravčík =

S1ovak footbaler

Filip Moratčík
Personal information
- Full name: Filip Moratčík
- Date of birth: 27 August 1991 (age 35)
- Place of birth: Czechoslovakia
- Height: 1.79 m (5 ft 10 in)
- Position: Midfielder

Youth career
- ?–2010: Nitra

Senior career*
| Years | Team | Apps | (Gls) |
| 2010–2014 | Nitra | 49 | (4) |
| 2011 | →Topoľčany (loan) | | |

International career
- Slovakia U-16
- Slovakia U-17
- * Club domestic league appearances and goals as of 8 June 2013

Filip Moravčík (born 27 August 1991) is a Slovak former football midfielder who played for FC Nitra in the Slovak Corgoň Liga. He is the nephew of the former footballer Ľubomír Moravčík.

== Career ==
Moravčík made his first Corgoň Liga appearance against FK DAC 1904 Dunajská Streda. He scored his first goal for FC Nitra in a 3–1 away loss against FK Senica.
