= Nicklas Pedersen =

Danish football manager (born 1987)

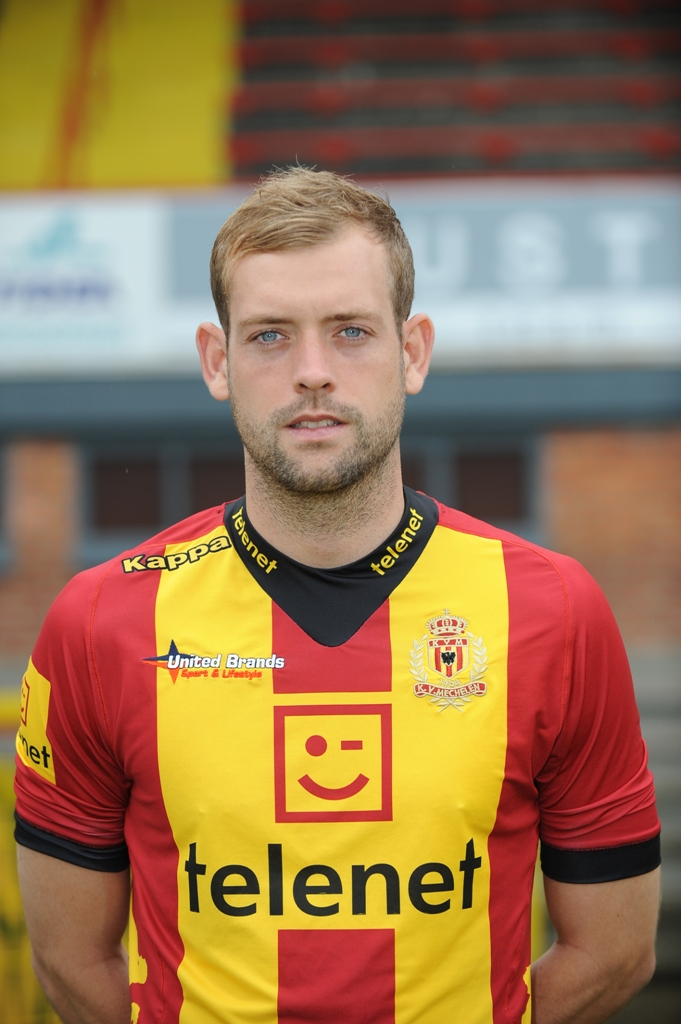
- Pedersen with Mechelen in 2012

Personal information
- Date of birth: 10 October 1987 (age 39)
- Place of birth: Køge, Denmark
- Height: 1.86 m (6 ft 1 in)
- Position: Forward

Team information
- Current team: HB Køge (head coach)

Youth career
- Herfølge BK

Senior career*
Years	Team	Apps	(Gls)
2004–2007	Herfølge BK	41	(18)
2007–2009	Nordsjælland	26	(9)
2009–2012	Groningen	69	(12)
2012–2013	Mechelen	25	(12)
2013–2016	Gent	41	(10)
2016–2017	Oostende	19	(0)
2017–2018	Mechelen	25	(4)
2018–2019	Emmen	12	(4)
Total		258	(69)

International career
2006	Denmark U-20	1	(0)
2007–2008	Denmark U-21	12	(3)
2010–2013	Denmark	13	(1)

Managerial career
- 2020–2023: HB Køge (U17)
- 2023–: HB Køge
- * Club domestic league appearances and goals

Nicklas Pedersen (born 10 October 1987) is a Danish professional football manager and a former player who is the head coach of Danish 1st Division club HB Køge.

== Club career ==
Pedersen started his senior career with Herfølge BK in the Danish 1st Division. He made his Denmark national under-21 football team debut in August 2007, and got his breakthrough with Danish Superliga club FC Nordsjælland in September 2007. In January 2009, Pedersen signed a contract with Dutch club FC Groningen. FC Groningen paid FC Nordsjælland €2.2 million for the Danish striker.

On 2 July 2012, Pedersen joined Belgian club K.V. Mechelen on a three-year contract.

On 1 July 2013, Pedersen joined fellow Belgian side K.A.A. Gent for a fee of €1.5 million.

On 14 May 2019 he was forced to retire due to a knee injury.

He is the son of the Danish football manager Jesper Pedersen.

== Coaching career ==
In the summer 2019, Pedersen began working as talent coach for his former club, HB Køge, helping with the morning- and individual training. On 6 January 2020 the club announced, that he would take charge of the club's U17 squad.

On 5 June 2023, after Daniel Agger resigned, Pedersen was appointed manager of HB Køge's first team.

== Honours ==
=== Club ===
Gent

- Belgian Pro League: 2014–15

== International ==
=== International goals ===
Scores and results list Denmark's goal tally first.

No	Date	Venue	Opponent	Score	Result	Competition
1.	5 June 2013	Nordjyske Arena, Aalborg, Denmark	Georgia	1–1	2–1	Friendly
