= Ermin Gadžo =

Bosnian footballer

Personal information
- Date of birth: 19 May 1990 (age 36)
- Place of birth: Sarajevo, SFR Yugoslavia
- Height: 1.81 m (5 ft 11 1/2 in)
- Position: Forward

Youth career
- –2009: Slovan Liberec

Senior career*
Years	Team	Apps	(Gls)
2009–2010	Arsenal Česká Lípa	0	(0)
2010–2011	Čelik Zenica	7	(0)
2010–2011	Velež Mostar	8	(0)
2011–2012	IFK Mariehamn	29	(5)
2014–2015	Zvijezda Gradačac	23	(4)
2016–2017	RWB Adria		

International career
2008	Bosnia and Herzegovina U19	1	(1)
- * Club domestic league appearances and goals

Ermin Gadžo (born 19 May 1990) is a Bosnian footballer who last played for RWB Adria in the United Premier Soccer League.

== Club career ==
Gadžo had a spell with Ålandish team IFK Mariehamn in the Finnish Veikkausliiga. He scored 6 goals for Zvijezda Gradačac in the 2014/15 Bosnian Premier League season, but the club was relegated to the second tier.

He played for American side RWB Adria in 2016 and 2017.

== Career statistics ==
As of 23 October 2024.

Appearances and goals by club, season and competition
Club	Season	League			Cup (Note: Includes Suomen Cup and Bosnian Cup)		League cup (Note: Includes Finnish League Cup)		Total	
Club	Season	Division	Apps	Goals	Apps	Goals	Apps	Goals	Apps	Goals
Čelik Zenica	2010–11	Bosnian Premier League	7	0	0	0	–		7	0
Velež Mostar	2010–11	Bosnian Premier League	8	0	–		–		8	0
IFK Mariehamn	2011	Veikkausliiga	13	1	–		–		13	1
IFK Mariehamn	2012	Veikkausliiga	16	4	0	0	2	0	18	4
IFK Mariehamn	2013	Veikkausliiga	0	0	0	0	1	0	1	0
IFK Mariehamn	Total		29	5	0	0	3	0	32	5
Zvijezda Gradačac	2014–15	Bosnian Premier League	23	4	4	1	–		27	5
Career total			67	9	4	1	3	0	74	10
