= Philip Petermann =

Austrian footballer

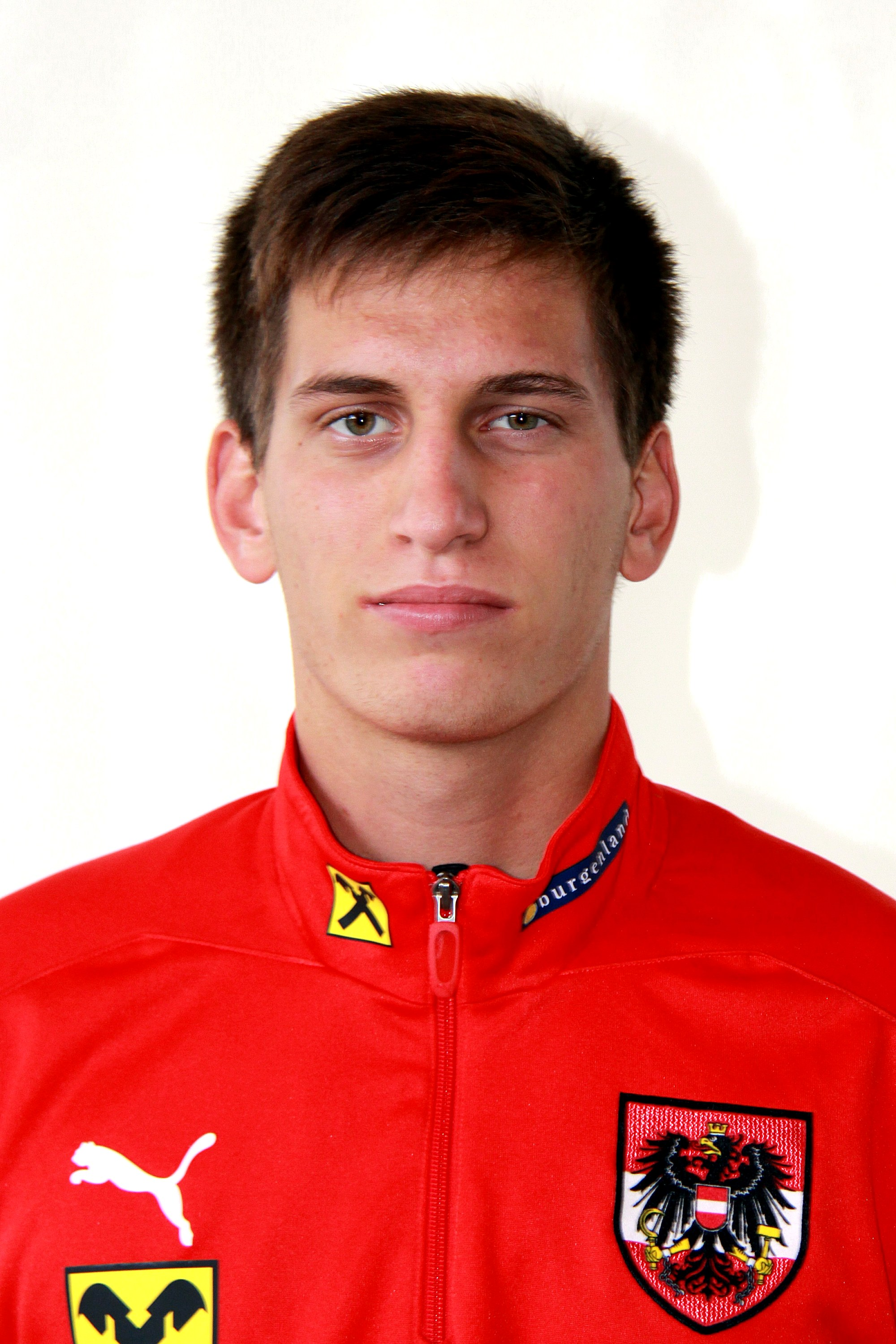

Personal information
- Date of birth: 3 August 1991 (age 35)
- Place of birth: Wien, Austria
- Height: 1.83 m (6 ft 0 in)
- Position: Goalkeeper

Youth career
- 1998–2005: SV Hirschstetten
- 2005–2009: Austria Wien

Senior career*
Years	Team	Apps	(Gls)
2009–2011	Austria Wien II	11	(0)
2010–2011	→ FC Pasching (loan)	18	(0)
2011–2012	SC/ESV Parndorf	17	(0)
2012–2017	SV Horn	74	(0)
2017–2020	SC Mannsdorf	84	(0)

International career
2007–2008	Austria U17	4	(0)
2009–2010	Austria U19	11	(0)
2010	Austria U21	1	(0)
- * Club domestic league appearances and goals as of 00:34, 17 January 2021 (UTC)

Philip Petermann (born 3 August 1991) is an Austrian footballer.
