= Hristo Ristoskov =

Bulgarian footballer and referee

Hristo Ristoskov (Bulgarian: Христо Ристосков) is a Bulgarian international football referee and player. He was born on 03.23.1971 in the town of Sandanski.

In his career as a soccer referee, he has overseen 159 games in the elite group "A" and 48 matches in the Cup of Bulgaria, which puts him in the Top 10 rankings in number of matches of all time. He has refereed one final in the Cup of Bulgaria in 2004 (CSKA Sofia - Litex) and a Super Cup match in 2006. Ristoskov refereed some matches of the championships of Romania and Cyprus. An International FIFA referee in the years from 2004 to 2010, he officiated a total of 42 international matches, including qualifiers for the European and World Cup.

As a footballer he played 68 matches and scored 12 goals for Vihren (Sandanski) in the second level of Bulgarian championship "B" group (1988-1993 year). As a player of Pirin Blagoevgrad, he was champion of Bulgaria for Under 15 (1986) and Under 17 years (1988). From 2010 he lives with his family in Austria. His motto as a referee: "The judge must defend the image and roots of the game." He is considered to be one of the best Bulgarian football referees from the beginning of the 21st century.
