= Thomas Götzl =

Finnish footballer (born 1990)

Personal information
- Date of birth: 31 August 1990 (age 36)
- Place of birth: Lauf an der Pegnitz, West Germany
- Height: 1.85 m (6 ft 1 in)
- Position: Defender

Team information
- Current team: FC Amberg
- Number: 16

Youth career
- Jahn Regensburg
- Hansa Rostock

Senior career*
Years	Team	Apps	(Gls)
2008–2010	Hansa Rostock II	23	(0)
2010–2011	SpVgg Weiden	9	(0)
2011–2012	RoPS	29	(3)
2012–	FC Amberg		

International career
2009	Finland U-19	2	(0)
2010	Finland U-21	1	(0)
- * Club domestic league appearances and goals as of 29 July 2012

Thomas Götzl (born 31 August 1990) is a Finnish football player currently playing for German Fußball-Bayernliga side FC Amberg. His father is German and his mother is Finnish.

Götzl has represented Finland 37 times at youth level.
