= Dimitri Pachkoria =

Ukrainian footballer

Personal information
- Date of birth: 7 December 1991 (age 34)
- Place of birth: Georgia
- Position: Midfielder

Senior career*
| Years | Team | Apps | (Gls) |
| 2007–2008 | Olimpi Rustavi-2 | 2 | (0) |
| 2007–2009 | Baia Zugdidi-2 | 22 | (3) |
| 2011 | Skala Morshyn-2 | 2 | (1) |
| 2011–2014 | Skala Stryi | 52 | (2) |
| 2014–2015 | Dinamo Batumi | 1 | (0) |
| 2014–2016 | Lazika/Odishi 1919 | 9 | (0) |
| 2014–2015 | → Lazika Odishi-2 | 2 | (0) |
| 2017 | FC Vorkuta | 1 | (0) |
- * Club domestic league appearances and goals

Dimitri Pachkoria (Ukrainian: Дімітрі Пачкорія, Georgian: დიმიტრი პაჭკორია; born December 7, 1991) is a Georgia-born Ukrainian former footballer who played as a midfielder or as a defender.

Pachkoria began his career in his native Georgia with various reserve teams. He ventured abroad to play in Ukraine, where he transitioned into the professional ranks with Skala Stryi. After several seasons in the professional Ukrainian circuit, he returned to Georgia in 2014 to play in the country's top-tier league with Dinamo Batumi. Following a short run with Dinamo, he continued playing in Georgia and finished his career in Canada.

== Club career ==
=== Early career ===
Pachkoria began his career at the youth level with Olimpi Rustavi's youth team. In 2007, he joined Olimpi Rustavi's reserve team and played with Baia Zugdidi's reserve team. In 2011, he went abroad to play with the Ukrainian side Skala Morshyn's reserve team.

Shortly after, Pachkoria entered the professional ranks by joining Skala's senior team in the Ukrainian Second League. In his debut season in the professional ranks, he appeared in 13 matches. Pachkoria debuted in the Ukrainian Cup against Poltava on August 7, 2013. He left Skala once the 2013–14 season ended.

=== Georgia ===
After three seasons in the Ukrainian third tier, he returned to Georgia to play in the country's top-tier league with Dinamo Batumi. Pachkoria debuted for Dinamo in the Georgian Cup against Chiatura. His league debut occurred on November 6, 2014, against Dinamo Tbilisi. His tenure with Dinamo was brief as he was released in the winter of 2015. Throughout his time with the club, he appeared in 1 league match and 2 cup matches.

Pachkoria played the remainder of the 2014-2015 season in the Georgian Pirveli Liga with Lazika Zugdidi. He appeared in 8 matches. He also played with the reserve team in the Meore Liga. The following season, the club was renamed Odishi 1919, where he made one appearance before leaving.

=== Canada ===
In the summer of 2017, Pachkoria played abroad in the Canadian Soccer League with FC Vorkuta. In his debut season in the Canadian circuit, he assisted Vorkuta in securing the league's first division title. Their playoff journey would conclude in the second round after a defeat by Scarborough SC.

== International career ==
Pachkoria was selected to represent the Georgia U-17 national team on September 14, 2007. In 2009, he was called to the Georgia national under-19 football team for friendly matches.

== Honors ==
FC Vorkuta

- Canadian Soccer League First Division: 2017
