= Alex Della Valle =

Sammarinese footballer

Personal information
- Date of birth: June 13, 1990 (age 36)
- Place of birth: Borgo Maggiore
- Height: 1.77 m (5 ft 10 in)
- Position: Full-back

Senior career*
Years	Team	Apps	(Gls)
2009	Verucchio	7	(0)
2009–2010	Sanvitese	0	(0)
2010–2023	Faetano	176	(1)
2010	→ Real Rimini (loan)	4	(0)
2011	→ Cattolica (loan)		

International career
2005–2006	San Marino U-17	5	(0)
2008–2009	San Marino U-19	5	(0)
2008–2012	San Marino U-21	14	(0)
2010–2014	San Marino	6	(0)
- * Club domestic league appearances and goals as of 1 June 2024

Alex Della Valle (born 13 June 1990) is a former Sammarinese footballer who last played as a full-back for SC Faetano.

He was capped by the San Marino national football team and made his international debut in 2010.
