= Vadzim Yerchyk =

Belarusian footballer

Personal information
- Date of birth: 14 July 1991 (age 35)
- Position: Forward

Youth career
- 2009–2010: Torpedo Zhodino

Senior career*
Years	Team	Apps	(Gls)
2009–2010	Torpedo Zhodino	5	(0)
2011	Dacia Chişinău	3	(0)
2011–2012	Sfîntul Gheorghe	12	(1)

International career
2010–2011	Belarus U21	7	(0)
- * Club domestic league appearances and goals

Vadzim Yerchyk (Belarusian: Вадзім Ерчык; Russian: Вадим Ерчик; born 14 July 1991) is a retired Belarusian professional football player.

== Honours ==
Dacia Chişinău

- Moldovan National Division champion: 2010–11
