= Muhittin Baştürk =

German footballer

Personal information
- Full name: Muhittin Erdem Baştürk
- Date of birth: 3 January 1991 (age 35)
- Place of birth: Neunkirchen, Germany
- Height: 1.83 m (6 ft 0 in)
- Position: Centre back

Team information
- Current team: SSV Jeddeloh
- Number: 33

Youth career
- TSC Neunkirchen
- Borussia Neunkirchen
- 1. FC Saarbrücken
- 2008–2010: Borussia Mönchengladbach

Senior career*
Years	Team	Apps	(Gls)
2010–2013	Borussia M'gladbach II	81	(4)
2013–2014	SV Elversberg	25	(0)
2014–2015	Gümüşhanespor	25	(1)
2015–2016	Bayrampaşaspor	30	(0)
2016–2018	VfB Oldenburg	44	(0)
2018–2019	Berliner AK 07	7	(0)
2019–	SSV Jeddeloh	23	(0)

International career
	Germany U17	9	(1)
	Germany U18	7	(0)
- * Club domestic league appearances and goals as of 1 July 2021

Muhittin Erdem Baştürk (born 3 January 1991) is a German footballer who plays as a centre back for SSV Jeddeloh. He made his 3. Liga debut on 20 July 2013.
