= Christian Petrovcic =

Austrian footballer (born 1991)

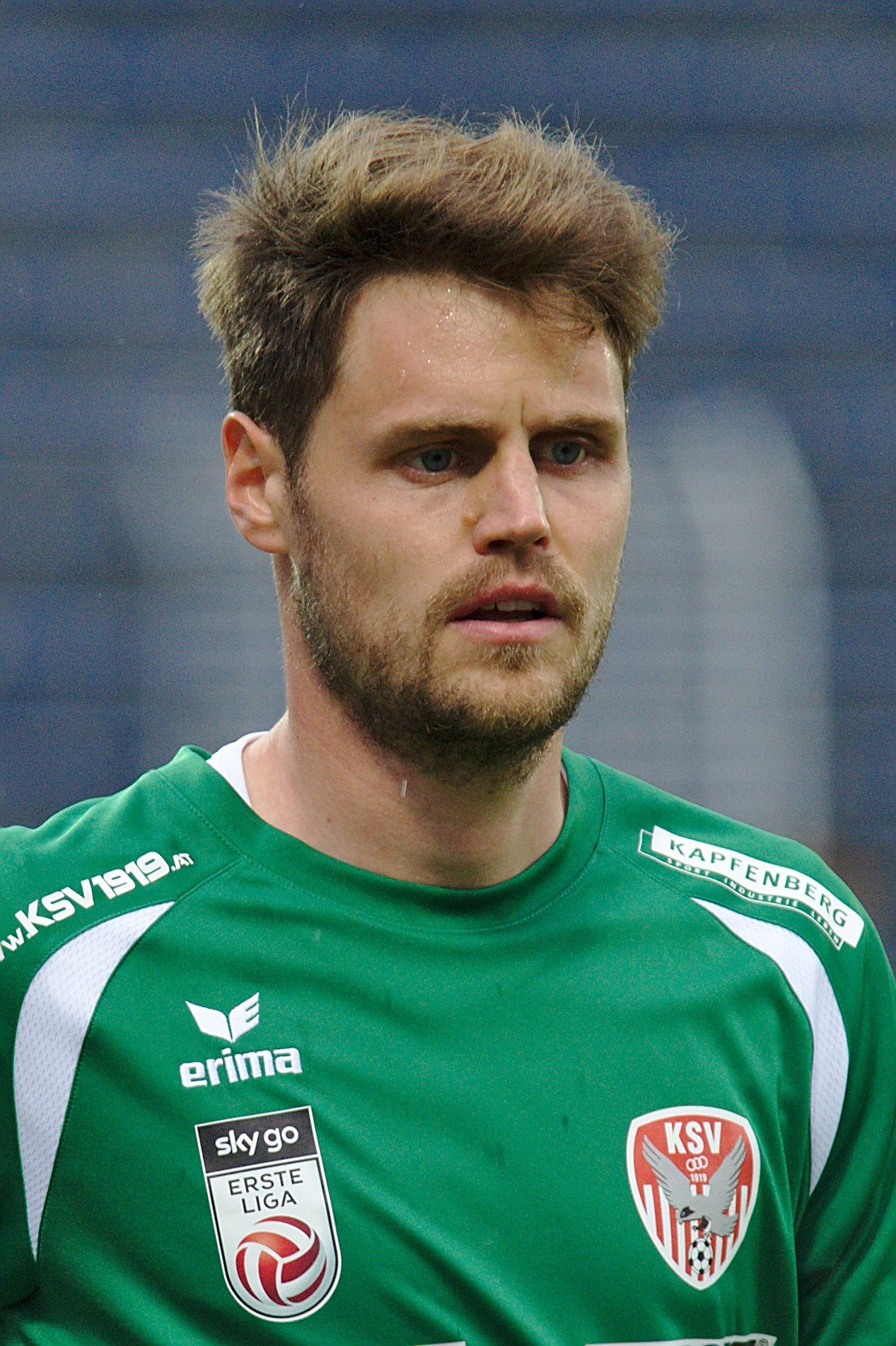

Personal information
- Date of birth: 26 February 1991 (age 35)
- Place of birth: Leoben, Austria
- Height: 1.83 m (6 ft 0 in)
- Position: Goalkeeper

Team information
- Current team: DSV Leoben
- Number: 31

Youth career
- 1997–2005: DSV Leoben
- 2005–2009: Grazer AK

Senior career*
Years	Team	Apps	(Gls)
2009–2011	Grazer AK	18	(0)
2010–2011	→ DSV Leoben (loan)	27	(0)
2011–2014	DSV Leoben	83	(0)
2014–2018	Kapfenberger SV	10	(0)
2018–	DSV Leoben		

International career
2006	Austria U-16	1	(0)
2007–2008	Austria U-17	3	(0)
2008–2009	Austria U-18	2	(0)
2010	Austria U-21	1	(0)
- * Club domestic league appearances and goals as of 19:35, 26 October 2020 (UTC)

Christian Petrovcic (born 26 February 1991) is an Austrian footballer currently playing for DSV Leoben.

== Career ==
=== Club career ===
Petrovcic started his career in his hometown at DSV Leoben. In 2005 he moved to Grazer AK, for which he made his debut in the Austrian Regionalliga in April 2009. In 2010 he returned to DSV Leoben on loan and stayed at the club after the season. In 2013 he was relegated from the Regionalliga with Leoben, where he also started working as a youth goalkeeper coach since the 2012–13 season.

In 2014 he moved to Austrian Football Second League club Kapfenberger SV, where he made his professional debut against SC Wiener Neustadt in March 2016. After leaving the club at in the summer 2018, he began working as a youth goalkeeper coach at Kapfenberger - also for the first team - and also at DFC Leoben.

For the 2018/19 season he returned to DSV Leoben.
