= Andreas Tiffner =

Austrian footballer

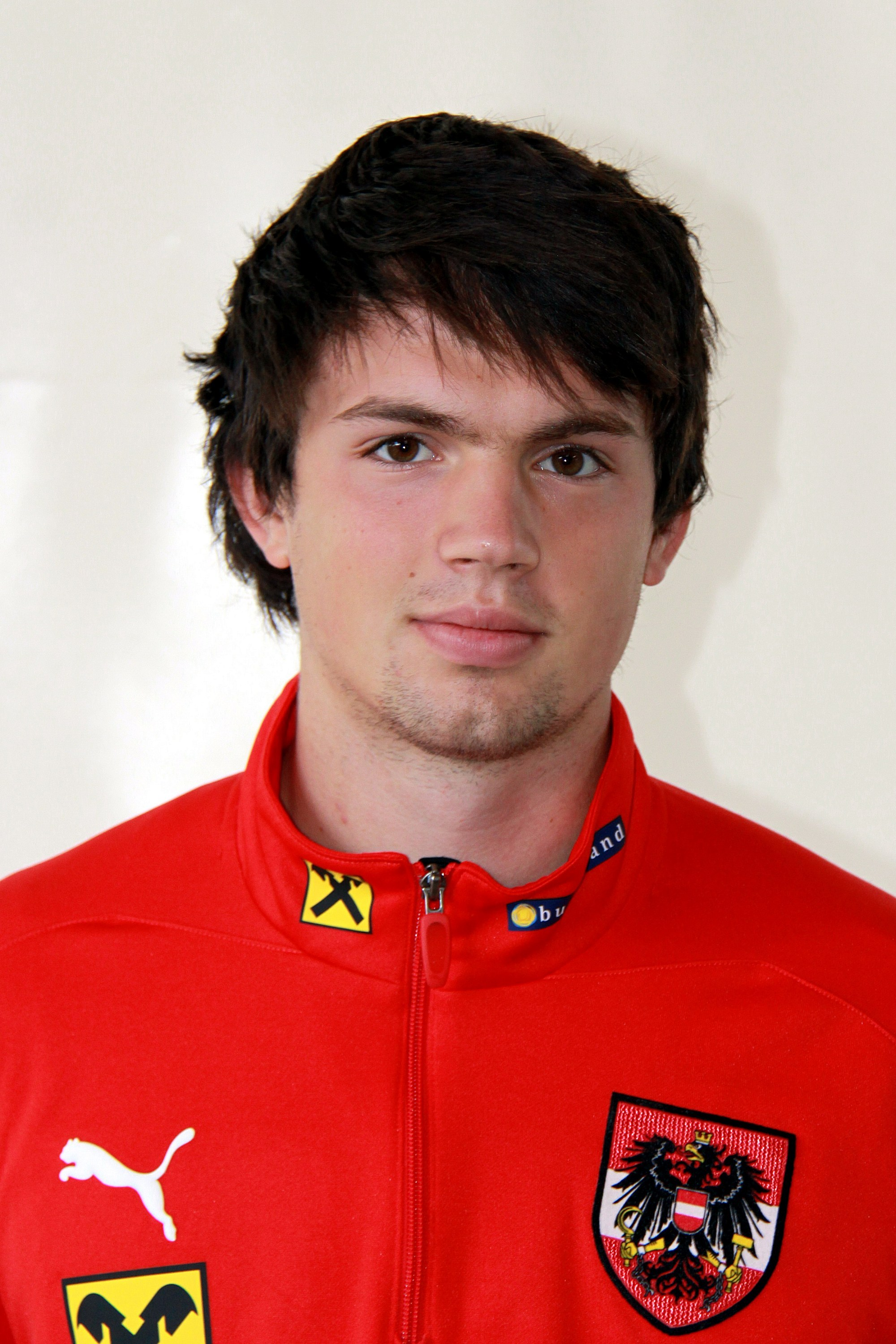
- Tiffner in 2010

Personal information
- Date of birth: 10 February 1991 (age 35)
- Place of birth: Feldkirchen in Kärnten, Austria
- Height: 1.87 m (6 ft 1 1/2 in)
- Position: Striker

Team information
- Current team: SK Austria Klagenfurt
- Number: 20

Youth career
- Red Bull Salzburg Juniors

Senior career*
Years	Team	Apps	(Gls)
2007–09	Red Bull Salzburg Juniors	14	(1)
2009–10	FC Blau-WWWW Linz	24	(10)
2010–2012	FK Austria Wien	1	(0)
2011	→ First Vienna (loan)	15	(2)
2012–2013	Wiener Sport-Club	27	(4)
2013–	SK Austria Klagenfurt		

International career^{‡}
2006–2008	Austria U17	12	(5)
2009–2010	Austria U19	9	(1)
2010	Austria U21	1	(0)
- * Club domestic league appearances and goals as of 15 May 2013 (UTC) ‡ National team caps and goals as of 18 August 2010 (UTC)

Andreas Tiffner (born 10 February 1991) is an Austrian professional footballer who plays in Austria for SK Austria Klagenfurt (2007). He plays as a striker.

Tiffner has represented his native Austria at Under-17 level. Tiffner represented the Austria U-17 team for their unsuccessful 2008 UEFA European Under-17 Football Championship qualifying round campaign.
