= Paul Bossi =

Luxembourgish footballer

Personal information
- Date of birth: 22 July 1991 (age 35)
- Place of birth: Luxembourg
- Positions: Striker; midfielder

Team information
- Current team: FC Mondercange
- Number: 25

Youth career
- 2006–2007: FC Progrès Niederkorn

Senior career*
Years	Team	Apps	(Gls)
2008–2010	CS Fola Esch	40	(4)
2008–2016	FC Progrès Niederkorn	134	(10)
2016–2019	Union Titus Pétange	17	(2)
2017–2019	CS Sanem (loan)		
2019–2023	FC Mondercange	47	(7)

International career^{‡}
- Luxembourg U17
2008	Luxembourg	3	(0)
- * Club domestic league appearances and goals as of 1 June 2024 ‡ National team caps and goals as of 27 June 2023

Paul Bossi (born 22 July 1991) is a Luxembourgish football player, who last played for FC Mondercange in the Luxembourg National Division.
