= Mikhail Kravchuk (footballer) =

Belarusian footballer

Personal information
- Date of birth: 19 September 1991 (age 35)
- Position: Midfielder

Youth career
- 2007–2008: Minsk
- 2009: BATE Borisov

Senior career*
Years	Team	Apps	(Gls)
2010–2014	Bereza-2010	117	(26)
2015–2016	Luch Minsk	23	(5)
2016–2017	Orsha	26	(3)
2017	Luch Minsk	12	(1)
2018	Naftan Novopolotsk	21	(0)
2019	Oshmyany	12	(0)
2019	Uzda	2	(0)

International career
2011–2012	Belarus U21	4	(0)
- * Club domestic league appearances and goals as of 31 December 2019

Mikhail Kravchuk (Belarusian: Мiхаiл Краўчук; Russian: Михаил Кравчук; born 19 September 1991) is a Belarusian former professional football player.
