= Bruce Lalombongo =

Swiss footballer (born 1990)

Personal information
- Full name: Bruce Lalombongo
- Date of birth: 26 April 1990 (age 36)
- Place of birth: Brazzaville, Congo
- Height: 1.81 m (5 ft 11 in)
- Position: Midfielder

Team information
- Current team: Yverdon Sport
- Number: 27

Youth career
- 1999–2003: FC Renens
- 2003–2007: Lausanne Sports

Senior career*
Years	Team	Apps	(Gls)
2006–2007	Lausanne Sports	4	(0)
2007–2010	Grasshopper II	35	(0)
2008–2010	Grasshopper	9	(0)
2010–present	Yverdon Sport	7	(1)

International career
2003–2004	Swiss U-16	6	(0)
2005–2006	Swiss U-17	9	(1)
2007	Swiss U-18	4	(0)
2008–2009	Swiss U-19	14	(1)
2009–2011	Swiss U-20	2	(0)
- * Club domestic league appearances and goals

Bruce Lalombongo (born 29 April 1990) is a Swiss footballer who currently plays for Yverdon Sport in the Swiss Super League.

== Career ==
Lalombongo began his career 1999 with FC Renens and joined after four years to the youth team of Lausanne Sports. He was the subject of a transfer tug of war between Real Madrid and Everton F.C. and was all set to join Everton in April 2007 but opted to remain in Switzerland to focus on his studies. He signed after the failed transfer to England with Grasshopper Club Zürich in summer 2007. In summer 2010 signed for Yverdon Sport.
