= Jonas Damborg =

Danish footballer (born 1986)

Personal information
- Full name: Jonas Brix-Damborg
- Date of birth: 17 April 1986 (age 40)
- Place of birth: Skørping, Denmark
- Height: 1.83 m (6 ft 0 in)
- Position: Midfielder

Team information
- Current team: Vorup FB (player-assistant); Hobro (board member)

Youth career
- 1990–1999: Frem Skørping
- 1999–2003: Støvring IF
- 2003–2005: Randers

Senior career*
| Years | Team | Apps | (Gls) |
| 2005–2011 | Randers | 124 | (1) |
| 2011–2021 | Hobro | 276 | (1) |
| 2021– | Vorup FB | | |
| Total | | 400 | (2) |

International career
| 2007–2008 | Denmark U21 | 7 | (1) |

Managerial career
- 2021–: Vorup FB (player-assistant)
- * Club domestic league appearances and goals

Jonas Brix-Damborg (born 17 April 1986) is a Danish retired professional footballer who played as a midfielder. He is currently functioning as a player and assistant coach at Vorup FB and is also a member of Hobro IK's board.

== Career ==
=== Randers ===
Damborg was 18 years old when he moved to Randers FC. Before, he had played youth football for Frem Skørping and Støvring IF. He made his professional debut on 10 April 2005 in a 1–1 home draw against OB. He came on as a substitute in the 38th minute for the injured John Sandberg. During the first half year, he made eight Superliga appearances. He scored a single goal for Randers – in a 4–0 away win over AaB on 22 October 2006.

=== Hobro ===
On 4 July 2011, it was announced that Damborg signed with Danish 1st Division club Hobro IK.

Damborg was part of the team that sensationally reached promotion to the Danish Superliga in 2014, with a team consisting of semi-professionals.

On 6 August 2020, Damsborg – who had grown into team captain – signed a contract extension until the summer of 2021.

=== Retirement ===
At the end of his contract, 35-year-old Damsborg announced his retirement from football and revealed, that he would continue at Hobro as a board member. Beside that, he was also hired as an insurance broker at Willis Towers Watson.

On 2 September 2021, Damborg confirmed that he would function as a player and assistant coach for Danish amateur club Vorup FB who was playing in the Jutland Series.

== Honours ==
Randers

- Danish Cup: 2005–06

Hobro IK

- Danish 1st Division: 2016–17
