= Riku Heini =

Finnish footballer (born 1990)

Personal information
- Date of birth: 9 December 1990 (age 35)
- Place of birth: Lahti, Finland
- Height: 1.74 m (5 ft 8 1/2 in)
- Positions: Midfielder; defender

Youth career
- FC Kuusysi
- FC Reipas

Senior career*
Years	Team	Apps	(Gls)
2007	City Stars	?	(?)
2008–	FC Lahti	50	(1)

International career^{‡}
- Finland U19
2010–	Finland U21	2	(1)
- * Club domestic league appearances and goals as of 17 October 2010 ‡ National team caps and goals as of 10 October 2010

Riku Heini (born 9 December 1990) is a Finnish football player currently playing for FC Lahti and Finland national under-19 football team.
