= 2009 UEFA European Under-21 Championship qualification =

Football tournament qualification stage

The 2009 UEFA European Under-21 Championship started on 31 May 2007 with a qualifying competition and finishes on 15 October 2008, before the final tournament on 15–23 June 2009. 51 of the 52 other nations in UEFA's jurisdiction, including Montenegro and Serbia who competed separately for the first time, went through a series of qualifiers to decide the seven other teams to join Sweden at the finals. Andorra did not take part.

The first stage of the qualifying competition is a group stage followed by play-offs. Each group winner, as well as the four highest ranked second place teams, will advance to the play-off. The play-off will determine which seven nations join Sweden in the final tournament. Sweden, as hosts, qualify automatically.

== Groups ==
=== Summary ===
Teams that have secured a place in the play-offs are highlighted in green, in their respective qualifying groups. The teams are ordered by final group position.

Group 1	Group 2	Group 3	Group 4	Group 5	Group 6	Group 7	Group 8	Group 9	Group 10
Italy	Turkey	England	Spain	Switzerland	Finland; Denmark	Austria	Serbia; Belarus	Germany; Israel	Wales; France
Croatia; Greece; Albania; Faroe Islands; Azerbaijan	Ukraine; Czech Republic; Armenia; Liechtenstein	Portugal; Montenegro; Bulgaria; Republic of Ireland	Russia; Poland; Kazakhstan; Georgia	Netherlands; Norway; Macedonia; Estonia	Scotland; Slovenia; Lithuania	Slovakia; Belgium; Iceland; Cyprus	Hungary; Latvia; San Marino	Northern Ireland; Moldova; Luxembourg	Romania; Bosnia and Herzegovina; Malta

=== Group 1 ===
Team	Pld	W	D	L	GF	GA	GD	Pts
Italy	10	7	3	0	21	5	+16	24
Croatia	10	7	1	2	20	12	+8	22
Greece	10	5	3	2	20	13	+7	18
Albania	10	3	3	4	10	13	−3	12
Faroe Islands	10	1	1	8	5	18	−13	4
Azerbaijan	10	0	3	7	6	21	−15	3

=== Group 2 ===
Team	Pld	W	D	L	GF	GA	GD	Pts
Turkey	8	6	1	1	18	6	+12	19
Ukraine	8	5	0	3	16	7	+9	15
Czech Republic	8	4	2	2	19	5	+14	14
Armenia	8	3	1	4	8	16	−8	10
Liechtenstein	8	0	0	8	4	31	−27	0

=== Group 3 ===
Team	Pld	W	D	L	GF	GA	GD	Pts
England	8	7	1	0	17	1	+16	22
Portugal	8	4	2	2	13	7	+6	14
Montenegro	8	2	2	4	5	12	−7	8
Bulgaria	8	2	1	5	4	9	−5	7
Republic of Ireland	8	1	2	5	4	14	−10	5

=== Group 4 ===
Team	Pld	W	D	L	GF	GA	GD	Pts
Spain	8	8	0	0	21	2	+19	24
Russia	8	5	0	3	14	6	+8	15
Poland	8	3	0	5	9	11	−2	9
Kazakhstan	8	2	0	6	9	18	−9	6
Georgia	8	2	0	6	6	22	−16	6

=== Group 5 ===
Team	Pld	W	D	L	GF	GA	GD	Pts
Switzerland	8	5	1	2	16	5	+11	16
Netherlands	8	5	1	2	10	3	+7	16
Norway	8	3	3	2	7	6	+1	12
Macedonia	8	2	3	3	5	6	−1	9
Estonia	8	1	0	7	1	19	−18	3

=== Group 6 ===
Team	Pld	W	D	L	GF	GA	GD	Pts
Finland	8	6	1	1	11	6	+5	19
Denmark	8	5	1	2	13	4	+9	16
Scotland	8	5	1	2	17	6	+11	16
Slovenia	8	1	2	5	4	13	−9	5
Lithuania	8	0	1	7	2	18	−16	1

=== Group 7 ===
Team	Pld	W	D	L	GF	GA	GD	Pts
Austria	8	6	2	0	12	6	+6	20
Slovakia	8	3	3	2	15	11	+4	12
Belgium	8	3	1	4	12	13	−1	10
Iceland	8	1	4	3	6	9	−3	7
Cyprus	8	2	0	6	9	15	−6	6

=== Group 8 ===
Team	Pld	W	D	L	GF	GA	GD	Pts
Serbia	8	5	2	1	24	5	+19	17
Belarus	8	5	2	1	15	5	+10	17
Hungary	8	4	0	4	14	13	+1	12
Latvia	8	3	2	3	7	6	+1	11
San Marino	8	0	0	8	1	32	−31	0

=== Group 9 ===
Team	Pld	W	D	L	GF	GA	GD	Pts
Germany	8	5	2	1	24	3	+21	17
Israel	8	5	2	1	16	5	+11	17
Northern Ireland	8	4	0	4	13	12	+1	12
Moldova	8	4	0	4	6	8	−2	12
Luxembourg	8	0	0	8	1	32	−31	0

=== Group 10 ===
Team	Pld	W	D	L	GF	GA	GD	Pts
Wales	8	6	0	2	20	6	+14	18
France	8	5	2	1	16	5	+11	17
Romania	8	4	3	1	11	5	+6	15
Bosnia and Herzegovina	8	1	1	6	7	17	−10	4
Malta	8	1	0	7	3	24	−21	3

=== Ranking of second-placed teams ===
Grp	Team	Pld	W	D	L	GF	GA	GD	Pts
10	France	8	5	2	1	16	5	+11	17
9	Israel	8	5	2	1	16	5	+11	17
8	Belarus	8	5	2	1	15	5	+10	17
6	Denmark	8	5	1	2	13	4	+9	16
5	Netherlands	8	5	1	2	10	3	+7	16
1	Croatia*	8	5	1	2	16	10	+6	16
2	Ukraine	8	5	0	3	16	7	+9	15
4	Russia	8	5	0	3	14	6	+8	15
3	Portugal	8	4	2	2	13	7	+6	14
7	Slovakia	8	3	3	2	15	11	+4	12

(*) Since Group 1 had six teams, only results against the top five ranked teams are taken into account. As Azerbaijan finished last, Croatia's 3-2 and 1-0 wins are disregarded for the purpose of calculating best runners-up overall.

== Play-offs ==
The play-off first legs were played on 10–11 October, while the second legs were played on 14–15 October.

Team 1	Agg.	Team 2	1st leg	2nd leg
Germany	2–1	France	1–1	1–0
Denmark	0–2	Serbia	0–1	0–1
Turkey	1–2	Belarus	1–0	0–2
Austria	3–3(p)	Finland	2–1	1–2
Wales	4–5	England	2–3	2–2
Italy	3–1	Israel	0–0	3–1
Switzerland	3–4	Spain	2–1	1–3

== Top scorers ==
Pos	Goals	Player	Nationality
1	7	Chedwyn Evans	Wales
=	7	Rouwen Hennings	Germany
3	6	Lazaros Christodoulopoulos	Greece
=	6	Antonis Petropoulos	Greece
=	6	Eren Derdiyok	Switzerland
=	6	Gojko Kačar	Serbia
7	5	Ádám Szalai	Hungary
=	5	Xhevahir Sukaj	Albania
