= Robert Trznadel =

Polish footballer (born 1990)

Personal information
- Full name: Robert Trznadel
- Date of birth: 15 January 1990 (age 36)
- Place of birth: Ruda Śląska, Poland
- Height: 1.78 m (5 ft 10 in)
- Position: Right-back

Youth career
- MKS Zaborze
- 2004–2009: Górnik Zabrze
- 2007: → Siena (loan)
- 2007–2008: → Parma (loan)

Senior career*
Years	Team	Apps	(Gls)
2009–2013	Górnik Zabrze	8	(1)
2010–2012	→ Okocimski KS Brzesko (loan)	14	(2)
2013–2016	Polonia Bytom	2	(0)
2016–2018	Odra Opole	42	(0)
2018–2021	Stal Rzeszów	40	(2)
Total		104	(5)

International career
2008	Poland U19	3	(0)
- * Club domestic league appearances and goals

Robert Trznadel (born 15 January 1990 in Ruda Śląska) is a Polish former professional footballer who played as a right-back.

== Biography ==
Trznadel started his career at Górnik Zabrze and in January 2007 signed with Siena aged 17, above the minimum age of international transfer within European Union. At the start of the 200–-08 season, he was signed by Parma and played there for one season. He then returned to Poland and made his senior debut in 2009–10 season in I liga.

== Honours ==
Okocimski KS Brzesko

- II liga East: 2011–12

Polonia Bytom

- III liga Opole-Silesia: 2014–15

Odra Opole

- III liga Opole-Silesia: 2015–16
- Polish Cup (Opole regionals): 2015–16

Stal Rzeszów

- III liga, group IV: 2018–19
- Polish Cup (Rzeszów-Dębica regionals): 2018–19
