= Joël Pedro =

Luxembourgish footballer

Personal information
- Full name: Joël de Almeida Pedro
- Date of birth: 10 April 1992 (age 34)
- Place of birth: Luxembourg City, Luxembourg
- Position: Midfielder

Youth career
- 2007–2011: FC Kehlen

Senior career*
Years	Team	Apps	(Gls)
2008–2012	Sedan B	9	(1)
2012–2018	F91 Dudelange	102	(12)
2018–2019	Jeunesse Esch	32	(4)
2019–2021	Swift Hesperange	26	(3)
2021–2023	Mamer 32	23	(8)

International career^{‡}
2009–2013	Luxembourg	9	(0)
- * Club domestic league appearances and goals as of 27 June 2023 ‡ National team caps and goals as of 29 May 2014

Joël de Almeida Pedro (born 10 April 1992) is a Luxembourgish former international footballer who last played for FC Mamer 32, as a midfielder.

== Club career ==
Born in Luxembourg City, Pedro has played club football in France for Sedan B which he joined in 2011. In 2012, he moved to F91 Dudelange.

In June 2019, Pedro joined FC Swift Hesperange.

== International career ==
He made his international debut for Luxembourg in 2009, and has appeared in FIFA World Cup qualifying matches.
