= Alan Stulin =

Polish footballer

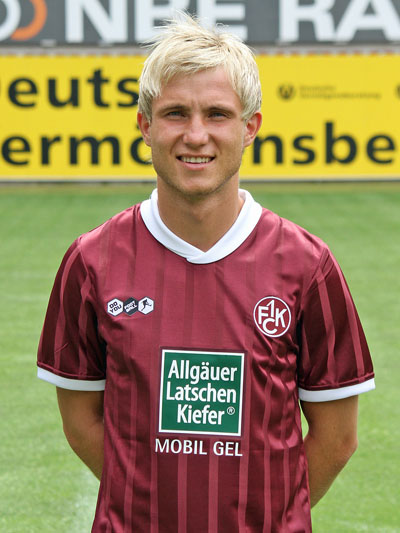
- Stulin in 2010

Personal information
- Full name: Alan Stulin
- Date of birth: 5 June 1990 (age 36)
- Place of birth: Bolesławiec, Poland
- Height: 1.70 m (5 ft 7 in)
- Position: Full-back

Youth career
- SpVgg 1920 Edenkoben
- FSV 1920 Offenbach
- 2007–2009: 1.FC Kaiserslautern

Senior career*
| Years | Team | Apps | (Gls) |
| 2009–2012 | 1.FC Kaiserslautern II | 92 | (4) |
| 2012–2013 | GKS Bełchatów | 6 | (0) |
| 2014–2018 | Wormatia Worms | 140 | (14) |
| 2018–2019 | Alemannia Aachen | 5 | (0) |
| 2019–2024 | UNA Strassen | 93 | (0) |
| 2024–2025 | UN Käerjéng 97 | 10 | (0) |
| 2025 | Rot-Weiss Wittlich 1993 | 3 | (0) |
| Total | | 349 | (18) |

International career
| | Poland U19 | 7 | (2) |
| | Poland U21 | 1 | (0) |
- * Club domestic league appearances and goals

Alan Stulin (born 5 June 1990) is a Polish former professional footballer who playedde as a full-back. He has dual Polish-German nationality.

== Career ==
In July 2012, he signed a one-year contract with GKS Bełchatów.

In June 2019, after a season with Alemannia Aachen, Stulin joined Luxembourg National Division side UNA Strassen on a three-year deal.

On 14 June 2024, Stulin moved to Division of Honour club UN Käerjéng 97.

On 6 June 2025, he joined German sixth tier club Rot-Weiss Wittlich 1993.
