= John Kennedy (Scottish footballer) =

Scottish footballer (born 1983)

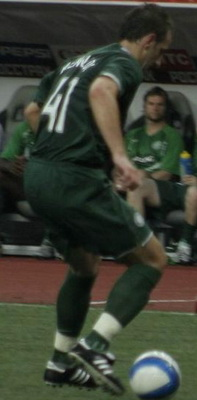
- Kennedy playing for Celtic in 2007

Personal information
- Date of birth: 18 August 1983 (age 43)
- Place of birth: Airdrie, Scotland
- Height: 6 ft 1 in (1.85 m)
- Position: Centre-back

Youth career
- –1999: Celtic

Senior career*
Years	Team	Apps	(Gls)
1999–2009	Celtic	28	(1)
2008	→ Norwich City (loan)	16	(2)
Total		44	(3)

International career
2002–2004	Scotland U21	15	(1)
2003	Scotland B	1	(0)
2004	Scotland	1	(0)

Managerial career
- 2021: Celtic (interim)
- * Club domestic league appearances and goals

John Kennedy (born 18 August 1983) is a Scottish professional football coach and former player, who is the assistant coach of Saudi Pro League side Al Qadsiah.

He played as a centre-back for Celtic and Norwich City, and won one international cap for Scotland. He suffered a serious knee injury on his international debut in March 2004, and retired in 2009 having failed to fully recover.

After retiring from playing, Kennedy worked as a scout, coach and assistant manager for Celtic, under managers Neil Lennon, Ronny Deila, Brendan Rodgers and Ange Postecoglou. He became interim manager in February 2021 after Lennon left Celtic; after the appointment of Postecoglou as manager, he went back to being assistant manager. In 2025, He left Celtic after 27 years at the club.

== Early life ==
John Kennedy was born on 18 August 1983 in Airdrie, North Lanarkshire. He is the maternal grandson of Celtic and Manchester United forward Jimmy Delaney and nephew of Motherwell defender Pat Delaney.

== Playing career ==
=== Celtic ===
Kennedy came through Celtic's youth system and signed his first professional contract on the same day as fellow defender Stephen McManus. He made his first-team debut aged 16 during the 1999–2000 season. Kennedy was the youngest Celtic player to be called up to the first-team squad and then the youngest debutant. He played in the U18 team in 2000–01, and lost the Scottish Youth Cup final to Aberdeen. In the 2003–04 season, he had a run in the Celtic starting eleven and came under scrutiny from scouts of A.C. Milan who contacted Celtic about making a move. It was during this season that Kennedy scored his only goal for Celtic, against Dundee in the SPL.

Kennedy received high praise for his performance in a 0–0 draw with Barcelona in a UEFA Cup last-16 clash at the Camp Nou in March 2004. Within weeks he was given his international debut, but was seriously injured by a dangerous tackle during that match. Kennedy required several operations by Richard Steadman before he could even attempt a comeback. Following his injury, the SFA compensated Celtic with respect to Kennedy's wages, as it had been suffered while he was playing in an international match. Before his injury, Kennedy made enough appearances to qualify for a title medal and played twice in the Scottish Cup win that season.

Kennedy finally resumed training in late 2006, and was an unused substitute for Celtic's Champions League match against A.C. Milan on 20 February 2007. He played his first competitive match since the injury on 22 April 2007, when Celtic clinched the SPL championship by winning 2–1 against Kilmarnock. Four days later, on 26 April, Kennedy signed a new three-year contract with the club.

Kennedy made further appearances for Celtic over the next several months, but during a Champions League match against Shakhtar Donetsk on 28 November 2007, he was stretchered off after he twisted his knee on landing from an aerial challenge. The initial diagnosis was that he sustained damage to his lateral meniscus and the posterior lateral complex of the same knee he had previously injured, ruling him out for three months. This match proved to be Kennedy's final appearance for Celtic.

==== Norwich City (loan) ====
On 14 July 2008, BBC Sport reported that Kennedy had joined Motherwell on a six-month loan deal, but this report was denied by Celtic later that day. Kennedy did, however, meet up with the Motherwell squad in Austria, on trial. Soon afterwards Kennedy joined Norwich City on loan until January 2009. He made his Norwich debut in a 2–0 defeat to Coventry City at the Ricoh Arena on 9 August 2008. Kennedy's performances for Norwich were impressive, and he scored in games with Derby County and Preston North End.

=== Retirement ===
Kennedy suffered ankle ligament damage during his time at Norwich, and he returned to Celtic after further damaging his troubled knee in December 2008. On 13 November 2009, it was announced that, at the age of just 26, Kennedy had retired from football on medical grounds.

He was awarded a Special Recognition award at Celtic FC end of season awards in 2010.

=== International ===
Kennedy played in both legs of the play-off defeat to Croatia U21s to qualify for the Under-21 Euros in 2003. He was the only remaining regular fit Scotland U21 centre-back going in to the second leg. His only goal at under-21 level came from a Michael Stewart set piece in a 2–1 against Israel U21s in 2002.

Following fine performances for Celtic, Kennedy was called up to the Scotland squad for a friendly against Romania on 31 March 2004, and was selected to start the match. After 14 minutes, Kennedy sustained a serious injury to his leg after a late challenge by Ionel Ganea, which eventually ruled him out of action for almost three years.

=== Testimonial matches ===
A testimonial match for Kennedy between Scotland and Celtic was discussed, while a match between Finn Harps and Celtic was arranged for 28 November 2010, but postponed. The game was then played on Sunday 6 March, with Celtic winning 4–1. A further testimonial match was arranged for Sunday 22 May 2011 at Celtic Park between Celtic and some of the Celtic team that reached the 2003 UEFA Cup Final, including then manager Martin O'Neill. This match was also postponed, and eventually replaced with a match between a team of Celtic Legends, managed by Martin O'Neill, and a team of Manchester United Legends. The match was played on 9 August 2011 with Celtic winning 5–2, and the proceeds were donated to Oxfam's East Africa charity appeal.

== Coaching career ==
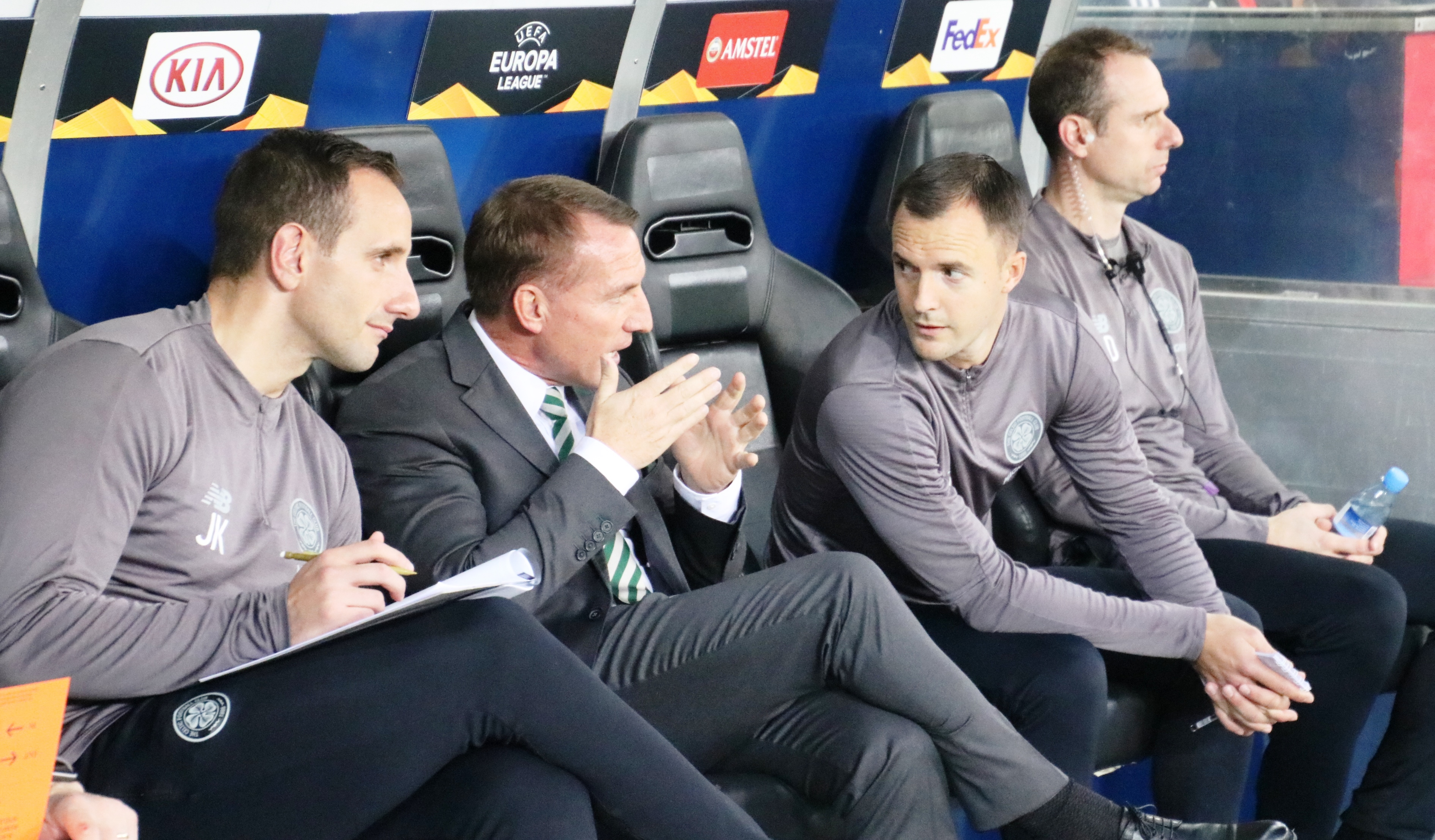
Kennedy (left) taking notes and listening, as Brendan Rodgers began discussing with Chris Davies.

After retiring as a player, Kennedy became a first-team scout for Celtic in 2010, working in this capacity for the club until 2011, travelling around Europe to help find new players for the club.

Kennedy gained coaching qualifications and worked as a coach with the club's U19 squad in season 2011–12, and the Development Squad (reserve team) from 2012 to 2014. He led the Celtic youth team to a league and cup double in 2011–12 and 2012–13 and a third straight title in 2013–14. Kennedy also oversaw the Under-19 team competing in the NextGen Series in 2011–12, a pan-European competition for youth teams.

He became first-team coach in 2014 after the appointment of Ronny Deila as manager, winning the Scottish league championship in each of Deila's two seasons in charge, as well as the Scottish League Cup in 2014–15. He continued in the role under Brendan Rodgers from 2016, and Celtic won domestic trebles in both 2016–17 and 2017–18.

In February 2019, Kennedy was promoted to assistant manager when Neil Lennon replaced Rodgers as manager. After the resignation of Lennon in February 2021, Kennedy was appointed interim manager of Celtic; he remained in post until the end of the season.

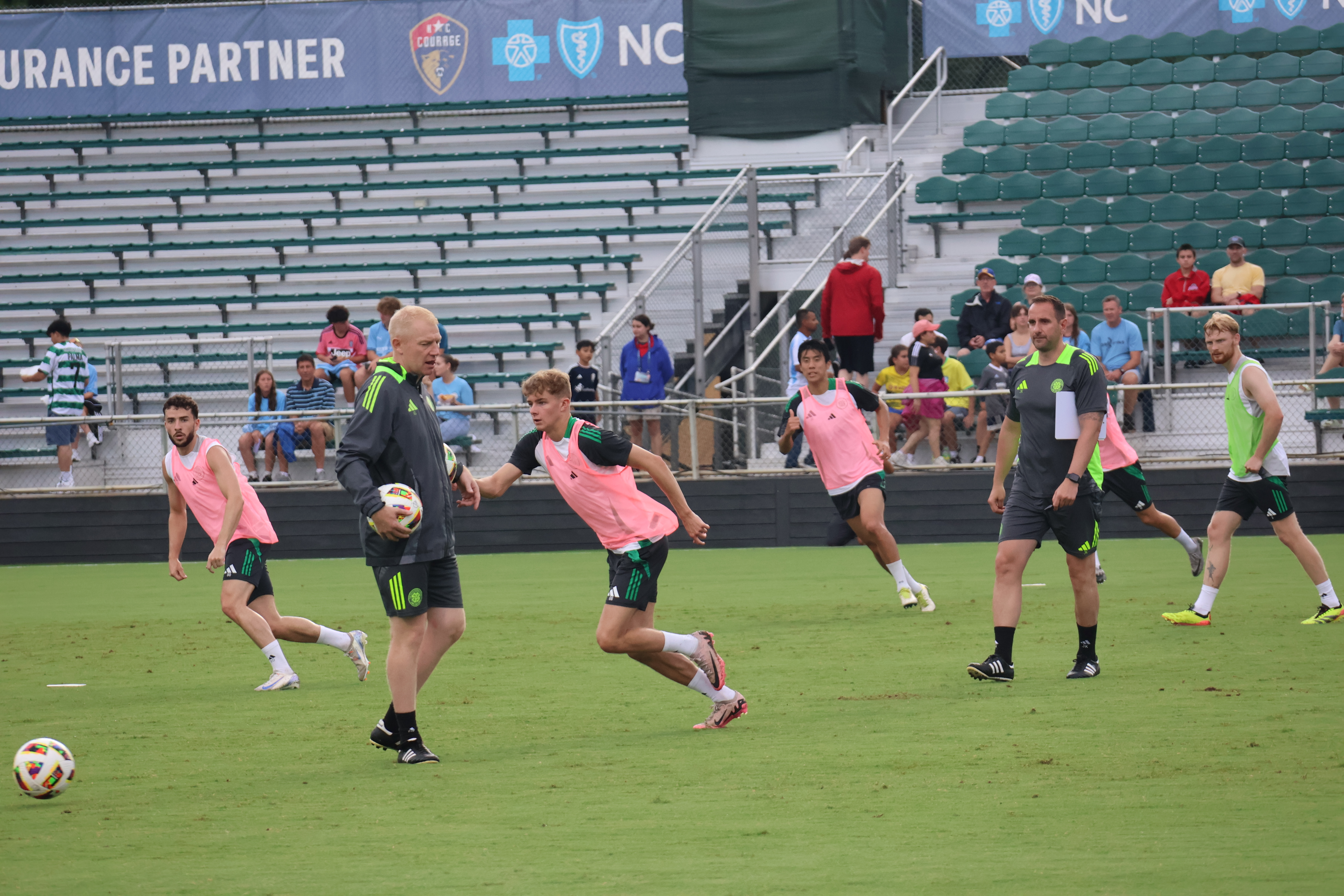
Kennedy (second right) looked on, as Celtic began training.

Kennedy remained assistant manager under Ange Postecoglou from 2021 to 2023 and Brendan Rodgers from 2023 to 2025. In October 2025, when Rodgers resigned, Kennedy left Celtic after 27 years, having won 22 trophies at the club.

== Charity work ==
In the summer of 2010, Kennedy joined the board of Directors of the UK based charity Football Aid. Kennedy is also a patron of Les Hoey's Dreammaker Foundation.

== Managerial statistics ==
As of 15 May 2021

Managerial record by team and tenure
Team	Nat	From	To	Record							
Team	Nat	From	To	G	W	D	L	GF	GA	GD	Win %
Celtic (interim)	(Scotland)	24 February 2021	15 May 2021	10	4	4	2	17	8	+9	40.00
Total				10	4	4	2	17	8	+9	40.00

== Honours ==
=== Player ===
Celtic

- Scottish Premier League: 2003–04, 2007–08

=== Manager ===
Celtic

- SPFL Development League: 2011–12, 2012–13, 2013–14
- Scottish Youth Cup: 2011–12, 2012–13
