= Scott Wright (footballer) =

Scottish footballer

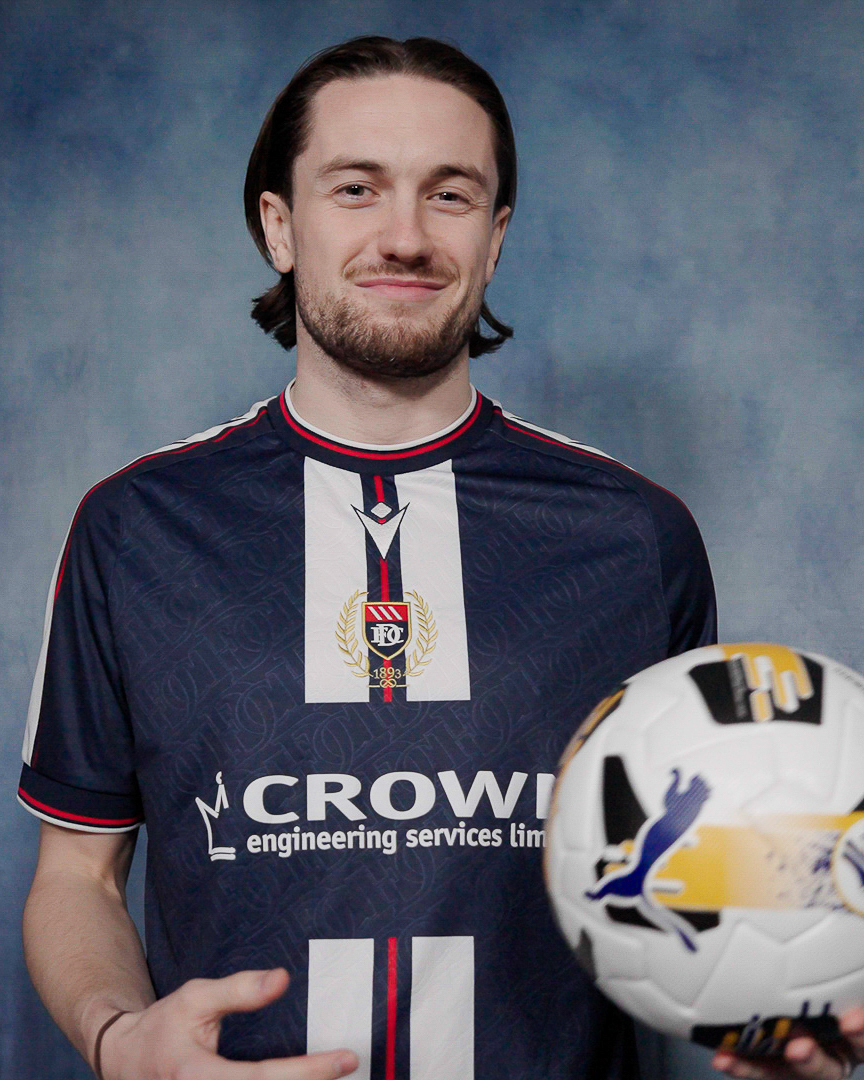
- Wright for Dundee in 2026

Personal information
- Date of birth: 8 August 1997 (age 29)
- Place of birth: Aberdeen, Scotland
- Height: 1.76 m (5 ft 9 in)
- Position: Winger

Team information
- Current team: Birmingham City
- Number: 11

Youth career
- –2014: Aberdeen

Senior career*
Years	Team	Apps	(Gls)
2014–2021	Aberdeen	59	(6)
2019	→ Dundee (loan)	13	(3)
2021–2024	Rangers	76	(7)
2024–	Birmingham City	16	(1)
2026	→ Dundee (loan)	9	(1)

International career
2014	Scotland U17	8	(2)
2014–2016	Scotland U19	15	(1)
2017	Scotland U20	1	(0)
2017–2018	Scotland U21	5	(0)
- * Club domestic league appearances and goals as of 13:38, 1 June 2026 (UTC)

Scott Wright (born 8 August 1997) is a Scottish professional footballer who plays as a winger for EFL Championship club Birmingham City.

Wright began his career at Aberdeen, where he made his competitive debut at the age of 16 in July 2014. He made 80 appearances over seven seasons for Aberdeen, and had a loan spell at Dundee in 2019. Wright was signed by Rangers in February 2021, and joined Birmingham City in 2024, before returning on loan to Dundee in 2026.

Wright made 29 appearances for Scotland at youth international level. He played for the under-17, under-19, under-20 and under-21 teams.

== Club career ==
=== Aberdeen ===
Wright was raised in the village of Balmedie in Aberdeenshire, where he was a neighbour of fellow footballer Cammy Smith, and attended Bridge of Don Academy. A product of Aberdeen's youth system, he made his first-team debut for the club aged 16 in a UEFA Europa League qualifying match against Daugava Riga in July 2014. Soon afterwards, he signed a three-year contract with Aberdeen. Wright scored a hat-trick in a 6–0 Scottish Premiership win against Partick Thistle on 21 May 2017.

==== Dundee loan and Dons emergence ====
Wright was loaned to Dundee on 31 January 2019, until the end of the 2018–19 season. Dundee were relegated at the end of the season.

After making his return to Aberdeen the following season, Wright featured for the club several times in the UEFA Europa League qualifying round, as well as in the first few league matches. However, in September 2019, he suffered a cruciate ligament injury in training and was forced to miss out on the rest of the season.

=== Rangers ===
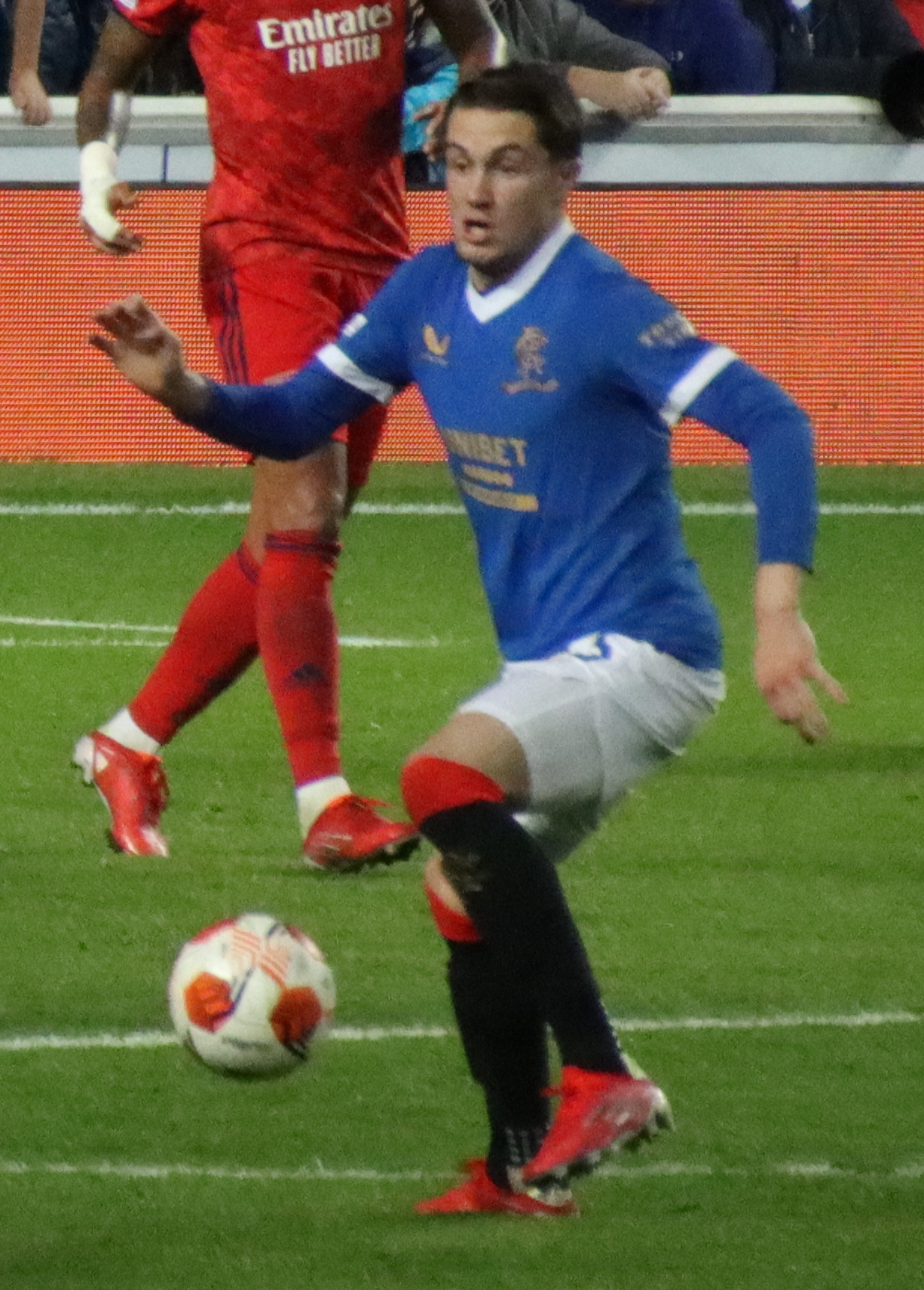
Wright playing for Rangers in 2021

Wright signed a pre-contract agreement with Rangers in January 2021, with the move to the Glasgow side to be completed during the summer of 2021. Aberdeen agreed to sell him to Rangers on 1 February for £175,000, with Ross McCrorie's scheduled move in the opposite direction also brought forward. Wright made his debut for the club a week later in a Scottish Premiership match against Hamilton Academical on 7 February. He scored his first goal for the club on 21 April 2021, in a 1–1 draw with St Johnstone.

A starter in the 2022 UEFA Europa League Final which Rangers lost in a penalty shootout to Eintracht Frankfurt, Wright came off the bench to score his side's second goal in their 2–0 victory over Hearts in the 2022 Scottish Cup Final three days later. A proposed transfer to Turkish team Pendikspor fell through in the summer of 2023.

=== Birmingham City ===
Wright made his first move into English football on 30 August 2024, when he joined recently relegated EFL League One club Birmingham City on a three-year contract; the fee was undisclosed. He marked his debut the following day at home to Wigan Athletic with the winning goal scored in stoppage time.

==== Dundee (second stint) ====
On 2 February 2026, Wright returned to the Scottish Premiership in his second stint on loan with Dundee until the end of the season. On 11 April, Wright scored his first goal for Dundee in 2,520 days to help them earn a point away to Kilmarnock.

== International career ==
Wright played youth international football for Scotland from 2014 to 2018 at under-17, under-19, under-20 and under-21 levels.

He represented the Scotland under-17 team at the UEFA European Under-17 Championship in Malta in 2014. The team were beaten by the Netherlands at the semi-final stage.

Wright was selected in the Scotland under-20 squad for the 2017 Toulon Tournament. The team secured the bronze medal, the nations first ever medal at the competition. He played for the under-21 team at the 2018 Toulon Tournament. Scotland lost to Turkey in a penalty shoot-out and finished fourth.

== Career statistics ==
As of match played 8 August 2026

Appearances and goals by club, season and competition
Club	Season	League			National cup (Note: Includes Scottish Cup, FA Cup)		League cup (Note: Includes Scottish League Cup)		Europe		Total	
Club	Season	Division	Apps	Goals	Apps	Goals	Apps	Goals	Apps	Goals	Apps	Goals
Aberdeen	2014–15	Scottish Premiership	1	0	0	0	0	0	2 (Note: Appearance(s) in UEFA Europa League)	0	3	0
Aberdeen	2015–16	Scottish Premiership	4	0	0	0	0	0	0	0	4	0
Aberdeen	2016–17	Scottish Premiership	5	3	2	0	0	0	1	0	8	3
Aberdeen	2017–18	Scottish Premiership	16	1	0	0	1	0	2	0	19	1
Aberdeen	2018–19	Scottish Premiership	13	0	1	0	2	0	2	0	18	0
Aberdeen	2019–20	Scottish Premiership	3	0	1	0	0	0	4	1	8	1
Aberdeen	2020–21	Scottish Premiership	17	2	0	0	0	0	3	0	20	2
Aberdeen	Total		59	6	4	0	3	0	14	1	80	7
Dundee (loan)	2018–19	Scottish Premiership	13	3	—		—		—		13	3
Rangers	2020–21	Scottish Premiership	9	1	2	0	0	0	2	0	13	1
Rangers	2021–22	Scottish Premiership	19	4	3	1	3	1	12 (Note: Two appearances in UEFA Champions League, ten appearances and one goal in UEFA Europa League)	1	37	7
Rangers	2022–23	Scottish Premiership	23	0	1	0	3	0	7 (Note: Appearance(s) in UEFA Champions League)	0	34	0
Rangers	2023–24	Scottish Premiership	23	2	3	1	3	1	4 (Note: One appearance in UEFA Champions League, three appearances in UEFA Europa League)	0	33	4
Rangers	2024–25	Scottish Premiership	2	0	—		0	0	1	0	3	0
Rangers	Total		76	7	9	2	9	2	26	1	120	12
Birmingham City	2024–25	EFL League One	13	1	2	0	—		5 (Note: Appearances in EFL Trophy)	2	20	3
Birmingham City	2025–26	EFL Championship	3	0	0	0	0	0	0	0	3	0
Birmingham City	2026–27	EFL Championship	0	0	0	0	1	0	0	0	1	0
Birmingham City	Total		16	1	2	0	1	0	5	2	24	3
Dundee (loan)	2025–26	Scottish Premiership	9	1	1	0	—		0	0	10	1
Career total			171	18	16	2	13	2	44	4	244	26

== Honours ==
Aberdeen U20

- SPFL Development League: 2014–15

Aberdeen

- Scottish Cup runner-up: 2016–17
- Scottish League Cup runner-up: 2018–19

Rangers

- Scottish Premiership: 2020–21
- Scottish Cup: 2021–22
- Scottish League Cup: 2023–24; runner-up: 2022–23
- UEFA Europa League runner-up: 2021–22

Birmingham City

- EFL League One: 2024–25

Scotland U21

- Toulon Tournament bronze medal: 2017
