= 2015–16 SPFL Development League =

SPFL Development League
- Season: 2015–16
- Champions: Celtic
- Longest unbeaten run: 26 matches Celtic

The 2015–16 SPFL Development League was the 18th season of the highest youth Scottish football league and the second season under the "Development League" format. It began in August 2015 and ended in May 2016.

== Changes ==
The league remained at 17 teams. All twelve 2015–16 Scottish Premiership clubs participated in the league, with Dunfermline Athletic, Falkirk, Hibernian, Rangers and St Mirren making up the numbers. Eligible players were those born in 1996 or later, but five players of any age were permitted in the matchday squad of 18.

== Development League table ==
Pos	Team	Pld	W	D	L	GF	GA	GD	Pts
1	Celtic	32	28	4	0	71	15	+56	88
2	Hamilton Academical	32	19	5	8	66	48	+18	62
3	Aberdeen	32	16	6	10	58	42	+16	54
4	St Johnstone	32	15	7	10	61	50	+11	52
5	St Mirren	32	15	6	11	52	52	0	51
6	Motherwell	32	13	8	11	50	45	+5	47
7	Hibernian	32	13	4	15	41	46	−5	43
8	Dundee United	32	10	10	12	64	57	+7	40
9	Dundee	32	10	10	12	44	55	−11	40
10	Kilmarnock	32	11	6	15	49	50	−1	39
11	Falkirk	32	10	8	14	55	64	−9	38
12	Heart of Midlothian	32	10	8	14	39	54	−15	38
13	Rangers	32	11	4	17	47	54	−7	37
14	Inverness Caledonian Thistle	32	9	9	14	39	52	−13	36
15	Ross County	32	10	6	16	39	65	−26	36
16	Partick Thistle	32	10	5	17	53	65	−12	35
17	Dunfermline Athletic	32	7	4	21	38	63	−25	25

Updated to match(es) played on 14 May 2016. Source: SPFL
Rules for classification: 1) points; 2) goal difference; 3) number of goals scored.

=== Matches ===
Teams played each other twice, once at home, once away.

Home \ Away	ABE	CEL	DND	DUN	DNF	FAL	HAM	HOM	HIB	INV	KIL	MOT	PAR	RAN	ROS	STJ	STM
Aberdeen		1–1	4–1	0–2	4–0	5–3	1–0	1–2	1–0	4–0	2–3	2–1	3–0	2–5	1–0	3–2	2–0
Celtic	1–0		2–1	4–1	4–1	3–2	4–1	2–0	1–0	4–0	3–0	4–0	3–0	3–0	4–0	2–0	2–2
Dundee	1–1	2–2		1–1	1–0	0–2	2–0	3–3	1–2	1–1	1–2	1–3	3–1	1–4	0–0	2–2	3–1
Dundee United	2–1	0–1	2–2		3–0	1–1	9–1	3–3	1–3	2–3	4–0	1–1	3–2	3–3	1–1	2–0	2–4
Dunfermline Athletic	1–3	0–1	0–1	2–5		2–3	1–2	2–0	0–1	0–0	0–2	1–1	4–1	0–1	2–0	4–2	1–4
Falkirk	2–1	0–1	0–4	0–0	2–2		3–3	4–1	3–3	1–0	1–3	0–3	1–2	1–4	6–0	4–3	1–1
Hamilton Academical	3–2	1–1	4–1	2–1	2–3	2–0		2–0	2–1	4–0	1–1	0–3	3–2	3–0	2–1	1–0	5–1
Heart of Midlothian	3–1	0–1	3–0	2–0	2–1	2–2	0–4		2–1	1–0	0–0	0–1	2–6	1–0	1–4	0–1	1–1
Hibernian	4–2	0–5	0–1	3–2	0–1	2–1	0–1	0–1		1–0	0–3	2–1	2–4	2–0	4–0	1–1	1–0
Inverness Caledonian Thistle	0–2	1–2	3–1	1–1	2–0	2–1	3–3	3–1	0–0		1–1	3–1	2–2	3–1	1–3	1–0	1–3
Kilmarnock	0–2	0–1	5–0	3–1	3–1	0–2	1–2	1–2	1–0	3–2		0–1	3–3	1–0	2–3	2–3	0–1
Motherwell	1–2	1–2	1–1	4–3	2–2	3–1	1–0	1–1	1–2	1–0	2–2		2–0	1–0	1–1	0–1	1–2
Partick Thistle	1–1	0–1	1–1	1–2	3–1	2–1	0–2	2–0	3–5	2–2	2–1	1–2		0–1	1–0	2–5	1–2
Rangers	0–1	0–1	2–4	4–1	3–0	1–2	0–4	2–2	3–0	2–0	2–2	2–2	0–3		0–4	1–2	0–1
Ross County	0–0	1–2	0–1	0–2	3–1	2–2	1–1	2–1	1–0	2–4	2–1	2–4	2–1	1–0		2–3	1–2
St Johnstone	2–2	0–1	2–1	2–2	1–0	6–1	4–3	2–1	0–0	0–0	3–2	3–1	4–2	0–2	3–0		3–3
St Mirren	1–1	0–2	1–2	2–1	1–5	0–2	1–2	1–1	3–1	2–0	2–1	3–2	1–2	3–4	1–0	2–1	

Updated to match(es) played on 726 May 2016. Source: SPFL
Legend: Blue = home team win; Yellow = draw; Red = away team win.
