= 2017–18 SPFL Development League =

Scottish football league

SPFL Development League
- Season: 2017–18
- Champions: Hibernian
- Top goalscorer: Oli Shaw (Hibernian)
- All statistics correct as of 1 August 2017.

The 2017–18 SPFL Development League was the 20th season of the highest youth Scottish football league and the fourth season under the "Development League" format. It began on 21 August 2017, and concluded on 7 May 2018.

== Changes ==
For the 2017–18 season of the Development League, three teams chose to withdraw from the competition. Dunfermline Athletic announced in May 2017 that due to the proposals made under 'Project Brave', which would see the implementation of a reserve league from the 2018–19 to replace the Development League, the club would not participate in the final year of the competition. Rangers also announced their intention to withdraw from the competition, instead receiving permission from the SPFL to take part in a programme of fixtures against a number of European elite youth teams, for example, Manchester United, Benfica and Bayern Munich. Inverness Caledonian Thistle also withdrew from the 2017–18 competition.

Eligible players were those born in 1998 or later, but five players of any age were permitted in the matchday squad of 18.

== Summary ==
=== League table ===
Pos	Team	Pld	W	D	L	GF	GA	GD	Pts
1	Hibernian (C)	26	19	2	5	72	35	+37	59
2	Dundee	26	16	5	5	52	33	+19	53
3	Heart of Midlothian	26	17	1	8	62	43	+19	52
4	Aberdeen	26	14	5	7	49	30	+19	47
5	Motherwell	26	14	3	9	45	34	+11	45
6	Celtic	26	13	5	8	49	27	+22	44
7	Ross County	26	11	7	8	56	52	+4	40
8	Hamilton Academical	26	11	6	9	46	38	+8	39
9	Dundee United	26	9	1	16	37	61	−24	28
10	St Mirren	26	7	5	14	43	59	−16	26
11	St Johnstone	26	7	5	14	41	57	−16	26
12	Partick Thistle	26	6	4	16	36	65	−29	22
13	Kilmarnock	26	6	1	19	29	53	−24	19
14	Falkirk	26	5	4	17	26	56	−30	19

Source: SPFL
Rules for classification: 1) Points; 2) Goal difference; 3) Number of goals scored
(C) Champions

=== Matches ===
Teams play each other twice, once at home and once away.

Home \ Away	ABE	CEL	DND	DUN	FAL	HAM	HOM	HIB	KIL	MOT	PAR	ROS	STJ	STM
Aberdeen	—	1–1	0–1	2–0	2–0	2–2	3–0	4–2	2–0	1–2	6–3	2–2	1–0	4–2
Celtic	1–4	—	2–0	4–0	1–4	1–1	4–1	1–1	4–0	0–2	1–0	0–0	1–2	2–0
Dundee	4–2	0–0	—	1–0	1–1	3–0	2–4	3–2	1–0	1–1	5–1	2–0	0–5	3–1
Dundee United	1–3	3–2	0–2	—	3–0	0–3	2–3	2–2	4–1	2–4	2–1	0–6	1–2	5–3
Falkirk	0–2	0–4	0–2	1–2	—	1–4	0–1	1–2	3–1	0–1	4–1	1–1	0–2	2–2
Hamilton Academical	1–0	0–3	1–2	3–0	1–0	—	0–1	3–1	2–0	1–3	1–2	2–2	2–2	4–1
Heart of Midlothian	1–3	0–2	1–1	2–1	5–1	0–2	—	2–3	2–0	4–2	4–1	4–1	3–2	1–0
Hibernian	2–0	3–2	2–1	6–0	1–2	3–1	1–4	—	2–1	4–2	3–1	2–1	5–0	4–0
Kilmarnock	1–0	2–1	1–2	0–1	6–1	0–1	2–4	1–6	—	0–1	0–2	1–1	6–3	0–2
Motherwell	0–0	1–0	3–5	0–2	3–0	3–2	1–2	1–2	2–0	—	1–0	1–2	0–0	4–1
Partick Thistle	2–1	0–3	3–1	4–1	1–1	1–4	0–6	1–3	0–1	0–3	—	1–1	3–3	3–3
Ross County	1–1	1–3	1–4	3–2	4–2	4–2	4–3	0–3	2–1	4–3	2–3	—	4–1	4–2
St Johnstone	0–1	1–3	0–3	1–2	0–1	0–0	2–4	1–4	3–2	1–0	4–2	2–3	—	3–3
St Mirren	1–2	0–3	2–2	2–1	3–0	3–3	3–0	0–3	1–2	0–1	1–0	4–2	3–1	—

Updated to match(es) played on 7 May 2018. Source: SPFL
Legend: Blue = home team win; Yellow = draw; Red = away team win.

== Top scorers ==
As of matches played on 7 May 2018

Rank	Player	Club	Goals
1	(Scotland) Oli Shaw	Hibernian	19
2	(Scotland) Jack Aitchison	Celtic	13
2	(Scotland) Neil McLaughlin	Partick Thistle	13
4	(Scotland) Ross Cunningham	Hamilton Academical	12
4	(Scotland) Innes Cameron	Kilmarnock	12
