= 2017–18 Aberdeen F.C. season =

Aberdeen
2017–18 season
- Chairman: Stewart Milne
- Manager: Derek McInnes
- Ground: Pittodrie Stadium
- Scottish Premiership: 2nd
- Scottish League Cup: Quarter-final
- Scottish Cup: Semi-final
- Europa League: Third qualifying round
- Top goalscorer: League: Adam Rooney (9); All: Kenny McLean; Adam Rooney (11 each)
- Highest home attendance: 20,528 vs Celtic, Premiership, 25 October 2017
- Lowest home attendance: 8,739 vs Kilmarnock, Scottish Cup, 3 March 2018
- Average home league attendance: 15,775
Home colours	Away colours

The 2017–18 Aberdeen F.C. season was Aberdeen's 105th season in the top flight of Scottish football and the fifth in the Scottish Premiership. Aberdeen also competed in the League Cup and the Scottish Cup.

Aberdeen also competed in qualifying for the 2017–18 UEFA Europa League.

== Summary ==
=== June ===
In the pre-season, Aberdeen manager Derek McInnes was the subject of press speculation regarding a potential move to English Premier League team Sunderland. After weeks of speculation, McInnes rejected an eventual approach by Sunderland on 15 June and committed his future to the Dons until 2019. Subsequently, only a few days later, he and assistant Tony Docherty, signed a one-year contract extension, keeping them with the club until the summer of 2020.

On 17 June, Jonny Hayes signed for Celtic for £1.3 million plus a season-long loan for Ryan Christie. Christie had been on loan at the club for the second half of last season.

On 26 June, after being linked with Sunderland with manager McInnes, 'keeper Joe Lewis signed a new deal to keep him at the club until 2020.

=== July ===
On 11 July, Shay Logan signed a contract extension until 2020.

On 12 July, Gary Mackay-Steven signed from Celtic for £150,000 on a two-year deal.

On 14 July, former player and Iceland international Kári Árnason re-signed for the club from Omonia on a free, signing a one-year deal. He had originally played for the club in the 2011–12 season.

On 19 July, at least 2 supporters were injured after an attack by Bosnians in the city of Mostar, the night before they were due to play Bosnia and Herzegovina side Široki Brijeg in their Europa League qualifier.

=== August ===
On 3 August, Aberdeen were again knocked out of the Europa League at the third qualifying round stage for the 4th year in a row, this time at the hands of Apollon Limassol. There was yet more trouble for Dons fans, this time during the match and after the final whistle. The club looked into this incident, in which later both clubs were fined by UEFA.

On 10 August, after spending months trying to sign him, Stevie May signed for the Dons for £400,000. Miles Storey the next day joined Partick Thistle for an undisclosed fee.

On 26 August, Aberdeen beat Partick Thistle 4–3 at Firhill, meaning they were the only club in the league to win their first 4 matches of the season.

=== September ===
On 5 September, defender Mark Reynolds signed a contract extension until 2019.

On 21 September, Aberdeen were knocked out of the League Cup at the quarter-final stage, being comfortably beaten 3–0 by Motherwell.

On 30 September, Adam Rooney scored his eighth hat-trick for the Dons in a 3–0 win at home against St Johnstone.

=== October ===
On 16 October, winger Scott Wright signed a contract extension until 2021.

On 19 October, defender Scott McKenna signed a contract extension until 2021.

On 24 October, it was announced that midfielder Kenny McLean would not be renewing his contract at the end of the season.

Subsequently, on 25 October, the Dons suffered their first defeat of the season, being comfortably beaten 3–0 at home to Celtic.

On 30 October, Graeme Shinnie, Kenny McLean and on-loan Celtic player Ryan Christie were called up for Scotland to play the Netherlands for a friendly due to take place on 9 November at Pittodrie.

Also on 30 October, the Dons signed forward and Finland under-18 international Miko Virtanen to the Development squad.

=== November ===
Before, during, and after the early November International break, manager Derek McInnes was continually linked with the vacant Rangers job and he dismissed this in the press to say, "My job is the Aberdeen manager and I'm here to talk about Aberdeen and our upcoming game against Motherwell, its only speculation."

After the club put continual plans of building the new stadium at Kingsford on hold Tom Crotty, an American businessman, invested £775,000 into the project.

=== December ===
On 3 December, speaking after the back-to-back defeats to Rangers, manager Derek McInnes admitted speculation linking him with the vacant Rangers job could be affecting the players after only picking up 7 points from the seven previous matches since Pedro Caixinha was sacked in October.

On 7 December, Derek McInnes rejected an approach from Rangers to stay with the Dons after "weighing up" and "having a lot to consider", embarrassing them in the process. The next day, in an interview, McInnes said "he wasn't prepared to walk away" from the Dons and also saying he was "really happy and didn't want to tarnish relationships."

On 16 December, Gary Mackay-Steven scored his first senior hat-trick in a 4–1 win against Hibernian.

On 28 December, the Dons re-signed Niall McGinn on a three-and-a-half-year contract after he terminated his contract with Gwangju. He will officially rejoin the club on 1 January 2018.

=== January ===
On 9 January, Greg Tansey was loaned out to Ross County. This freed space in the squad to make a signing the following day, Chidi Nwakali, joining on loan from Manchester City.

During the Scottish Football winter break, and as in the previous year, the Dons headed off to Dubai for a week of winter training and played against Uzbekistan side Lokomotiv Tashkent in a friendly in which they lost 2–0.

Before the Scottish Cup match against St Mirren, Craig Storie was released and Frank Ross signed a new deal until 2019 and then immediately loaned to Greenock Morton until the end of the season.

Shortly after the 4–1 Scottish Cup win against St Mirren, it was confirmed that Kenny McLean had signed for Norwich City for an undisclosed fee, believed to be in the region of £200,000, but would stay at the Dons until the end of the season.

=== February ===
On 8 February, Gary Mackay-Steven won the Scottish Cup Goal of the fourth round award for his sensational strike in the previous month's 4–1 win against St Mirren.

On 11 February, Aberdeen qualified for the Quarter Finals of the Scottish Cup by, in the end, convincingly beating Dundee United 4–2.

After regaining second place in the League, Aberdeen lost 2–0 at Hibernian and then lost at home to Celtic by the same scoreline. This was the tenth time in a row that Aberdeen had lost to Celtic under Brendan Rodgers.

On 28 February, after overnight snow and the storm "Beast from the East", Aberdeen's match at Motherwell's Fir Park was postponed.

=== March ===
After signing a new deal in October, on 7 March, defender Scott McKenna signed another contract extension until 2023.

On 12 March, midfielders Kenny McLean and Ryan Christie, and for the first-time defender Scott McKenna, were called up to the Scotland squad for friendlies against Costa Rica and Hungary. McKenna earned his first cap by starting the match against Costa Rica and played the full 90 minutes.

On 13 March, winger Scott Wright was called up for the Scotland under-21s.

=== April ===
Without suspended trio captain Graeme Shinnie, previously ever-present Kenny McLean and right back Shay Logan, Aberdeen lost to Motherwell 3–0 in the semi-final of the Scottish Cup at Hampden Park. After the match, manager Derek McInnes criticised his own recruitment this season.

On 24 April, after the plans had been put on hold, Aberdeen were granted official planning permission to start on the new stadium at Kingsford.

On 25 April, defender Scott McKenna was nominated for Scottish Young Player of the Year.

On 26 April, Aberdeen youth lost the Scottish Youth Cup final to Hibernian youth 3–1 at Hampden Park.

=== May ===
On 5 May, the Dons announced Hamilton Academical youth Lewis Ferguson would be joining the club on 1 July 2018, paying a development fee.

On 6 May, it was announced that former two-time European Cup winning Manager Sir Alex Ferguson underwent an emergency surgery after suffering a brain haemorrhage.

After drawing at home to Rangers and the following day Hearts beating Hibernian, Aberdeen sealed European qualification for the fifth season in a row.

On 10 May, at the Aberdeen FC awards event, Scott McKenna won the player, young player, and goal of the season awards.

On 13 May, on the final day of the season, the Dons won at Celtic Park for the first time in the league since 2004 and also kept a clean sheet there for the first time since 1994, securing the runners-up spot in the process with a 1–0 win thanks to a goal from Andrew Considine.

On 14 May, defender Scott McKenna, midfielders Graeme Shinnie, Kenny McLean and Ryan Christie were called up to the Scotland squad for friendlies against Peru and Mexico.

On the squad for next season, goalie Danny Rogers signed a new 2-year deal, the club announced the loaned players returned to their clubs respectively, and that Nicky Maynard, Kári Árnason, and Daniel Harvie had left the club after their contracts had expired.

== Results and fixtures ==
Win Draw Loss Postponed

=== Pre-season ===
1 July 2017 Friendly	St Johnstone	0–3	Aberdeen	McDiarmid Park
15:00 BST		AFC Report	Rooney 32'; Christie 43'; Anderson 85'	Attendance: 1,939

6 July 2017 Friendly	Arbroath	1–3	Aberdeen	Gayfield Park
19:30 BST	Kane Hester 86'	AFC Report	Rooney 21'; Stewart 43'; Stockley 78'	Attendance: 2,081; Referee: Mat Northcroft

23 July 2017 Friendly	Brechin City	1–4	Aberdeen	Glebe Park
14:00 BST	Love 70'	Report	McKenna 9'; Storey 32'; Árnason 56'; Rooney 58' (pen.)	Attendance: 1,196

=== Scottish Premiership ===
6 August 2017 1	Aberdeen	2–0	Hamilton Academical	Pittodrie Stadium
15:00 BST	Shinnie (yellow card) 13'; O'Connor 26'; Storey 90'	BBC Report	Sarris (yellow card) 22'; McMann (yellow card) 27'; Tomas (yellow card) 54' (yellow-red card) 62'; Skondras (yellow card) 58'	Attendance: 15,165; Referee: Euan Anderson

12 August 2017 2	Ross County	1–2	Aberdeen	Global Energy Stadium
15:00 BST	Curran 2'; Routis (yellow card) 39'; O'Brien (yellow card) 57'; Keillor-Dunn (yellow card) 82'	BBC Report	Reynolds 23'; Logan 71'; Shinnie (yellow card) 72'	Attendance: 5,965; Referee: Don Robertson

19 August 2017 3	Aberdeen	2–1	Dundee	Pittodrie Stadium
15:00 BST	May 11', 79' (yellow card) 65'; Logan (yellow card) 41'; McLean (yellow card) 90+1'	BBC Report	Deacon 53'; Kamara (yellow card) 64'	Attendance: 15,646; Referee: Kevin Clancy

26 August 2017 4	Partick Thistle	3–4	Aberdeen	Firhill Stadium
15:00 BST	Erskine 8'; Doolan 13'; Keown 54' (yellow card) 49' (yellow-red card) 90+1'; Turnbull (yellow card) 68'	BBC Report	Christie 5'; McLean 42' (pen.); Wright 52'; Rooney 84'	Attendance: 4,768; Referee: Bobby Madden

9 September 2017 5	Heart of Midlothian	0–0	Aberdeen	Murrayfield Stadium (Note: Hearts played this home match at Murrayfield Stadium, instead of their regular stadium Tynecastle due to ongoing renovations.)
15:00 BST	May (yellow card) 90+3'	BBC Report	Souttar (yellow card) 11'; Berra (yellow card) 53'; Walker (yellow card) 73'	Attendance: 24,248; Referee: Craig Thomson

16 September 2017 6	Aberdeen	1–1	Kilmarnock	Pittodrie Stadium
15:00 BST	May 10'; Wright (yellow card) 20'; Maynard (yellow card) 45'	BBC Report	Wilson (yellow card) 16'; Jones 48'; McKenzie (yellow card) 88'; Greer (yellow card) 90+1'	Attendance: 15,037; Referee: Stephen Finnie

24 September 2017 7	Motherwell	0–1	Aberdeen	Fir Park
12:15 BST	McHugh (yellow card) 49'; Dunne (yellow card) 88'	BBC Report	Logan (yellow card) 45'; Considine 57'; Shinnie (yellow card) 89'	Attendance: 4,535; Referee: Nick Walsh

30 September 2017 8	Aberdeen	3–0	St Johnstone	Pittodrie Stadium
15:00 BST	Rooney 7', 18', 81' (pen.); Shinnie (yellow card) 58'; O'Connor (yellow card) 84'	BBC Report	Millar (yellow card) 62'	Attendance: 14,879; Referee: John Beaton

14 October 2017 9	Hibernian	0–1	Aberdeen	Easter Road
15:00 BST	Stevenson (yellow card) 14'; McGinn (yellow card) 43'	BBC Report	Shinnie (yellow card) 28'; O'Connor (yellow card) 34'; Mackay-Steven 38'; May (yellow card) 79'	Attendance: 19,038; Referee: Steven McLean

25 October 2017 11	Aberdeen	0–3	Celtic	Pittodrie Stadium
19:45 BST	Árnason (yellow card) 24'; O'Connor (yellow card) 44'; Considine (yellow card) 60'; McKenna (yellow card) 62'	BBC Sport	Tierney 13'; Dembélé 39', 63'	Attendance: 20,528; Referee: Craig Thomson

28 October 2017 12	Aberdeen	2–1	Ross County	Pittodrie Stadium
15:00 BST	Christie 12' (yellow card) 88'; McLean 52' (pen.) (yellow card) 90+2'; McKenna (yellow card) 75'	BBC Report	Gardyne 8' (yellow card) 90+1'; Lindsay (yellow card) 52'; Draper (yellow card) 84'	Attendance: 13,918; Referee: Don Robertson

4 November 2017 13	Hamilton Academical	2–2	Aberdeen	SuperSeal Stadium
15:00 GMT	Imrie 19'; MacKinnon (yellow card) 39'; Templeton 76'; Skondras (yellow card) 90+3'	BBC Report	Stewart 27'; Árnason 74'	Attendance: 3,099; Referee: Nick Walsh

18 November 2017 14	Aberdeen	0–2	Motherwell	Pittodrie Stadium
15:00 GMT	Considine (yellow card) 42'; Christie (yellow card) 86'	BBC Report	Bowman (yellow card) 41'; Moult 42', 54'	Attendance: 14,013; Referee: Bobby Madden

26 November 2017 15	Kilmarnock	1–3	Aberdeen	Rugby Park
12:30 GMT	Broadfoot (yellow card) 11'; Frizzell (yellow card) 37'; Jones 66' (red card) 88'	BBC Report	McLean 1'; Broadfoot 12' (o.g.); Shinnie (yellow card) 39'; May 74'; Tansey (yellow card) 90'	Attendance: 4,198; Referee: Steven McLean

29 November 2017 10 (Note: Rearranged game after postponement.)	Rangers	3–0	Aberdeen	Ibrox Stadium
19:45 GMT	Tavernier 7' (pen.), 70'; Peña 27'; McCrorie (yellow card) 38'; Holt (yellow card) 57'; Alves (yellow card) 65'	BBC Report	O'Connor (yellow card) 18'; Shinnie (yellow card) 33'; Mackay-Steven (yellow card) 44'; Christie (yellow card) 58' (yellow-red card) 84'	Attendance: 48,687; Referee: Andrew Dallas

3 December 2017 16	Aberdeen	1–2	Rangers	Pittodrie Stadium
12:30 GMT	Shinnie (yellow card) 12'; Ross 65'	BBC Report	Windass (yellow card) 5' (goal) 63'; Wilson 14'; McCrorie (yellow card) 47'; Jack (red card) 56'; Herrera (yellow card) 90+4'	Attendance: 18,983; Referee: Willie Collum

8 December 2017 17	Dundee	0–1	Aberdeen	Dens Park
19:45 GMT	Moussa (yellow card) 6'; Kamara (yellow card) 61'; Kerr (yellow card) 74'	BBC Report	Logan (yellow card) 44'; McKenna 48'; McLean (yellow card) 62'	Attendance: 6,451; Referee: Nick Walsh

13 December 2017 18	St Johnstone	0–3	Aberdeen	McDiarmid Park
19:45 GMT	O'Halloran (yellow card) 14'	BBC Report	Rooney 20'; Árnason 33'; Shinnie (yellow card) 38'; Christie 60'	Attendance: 2,911; Referee: Alan Muir

16 December 2017 19	Aberdeen	4–1	Hibernian	Pittodrie Stadium
12:30 GMT	Shinnie 11'; Mackay-Steven 36', 45', 62'	BBC Report	Whittaker (yellow card) 64'; Stokes 89'	Attendance: 14,923; Referee: Bobby Madden

23 December 2017 20	Celtic	3–0	Aberdeen	Celtic Park
15:00 GMT	Lustig 40' (yellow card) 77'; Hayes 69'; Ntcham 76'	BBC Report	Árnason (yellow card) 8'; Shinnie (yellow card) 30'; Ball (yellow card) 35'; McLean (yellow card) 71'	Attendance: 58,975; Referee: Craig Thomson

27 December 2017 21	Aberdeen	1–0	Partick Thistle	Pittodrie Stadium
19:45 GMT	Rooney 61'	BBC Report	Devine (yellow card) 86'	Attendance: 14,830; Referee: Euan Anderson

30 December 2017 22	Aberdeen	0–0	Heart of Midlothian	Pittodrie Stadium
15:00 GMT		BBC Report	Cowie (yellow card) 62'; Milinković (yellow card) 67'; Souttar (yellow card) 75'; Brandon (yellow card) 85'; Lafferty (red card) 88'; Cochrane (yellow card) 90'	Attendance: 18,371; Referee: John Beaton

24 January 2018 23	Rangers	2–0	Aberdeen	Ibrox Stadium
19:45 GMT	Morelos 32'; Tavernier 80' (pen.)	BBC Report	Considine (yellow card) 44'; McKenna (yellow card) 53'; Shinnie (yellow card) 88'	Attendance: 49,707; Referee: Bobby Madden

27 January 2018 24	Aberdeen	3–1	Kilmarnock	Pittodrie Stadium
15:00 GMT	McKenna 49', 52'; McGinn 72'; Nwakali (yellow card) 90'	BBC Report	K. Boyd 28'; Dicker (yellow card) 43'; Jones (yellow card) 50'	Attendance: 13,723; Referee: Craig Thomson

31 January 2018 25	Ross County	2–4	Aberdeen	Global Energy Stadium
19:45 GMT	Chow (yellow card) 74'; Schalk 77', 82'	BBC Report	McLean 28', 64' (yellow card) 45'; Rooney 32', 34' (pen.); Shinnie (yellow card) 59'; Logan (yellow card) 80'; Stewart (yellow card) 90+1'	Attendance: 4,318; Referee: Andrew Dallas

3 February 2018 26	Aberdeen	3–0	Hamilton Academical	Pittodrie Stadium
15:00 GMT	Considine 26', 87'; McGinn 80'	BBC Report	Sarris (yellow card) 90+2'	Attendance: 13,531; Referee: Euan Anderson

17 February 2018 27	Hibernian	2–0	Aberdeen	Easter Road
15:00 GMT	Allan (yellow card) 43'; Boyle 46'; Kamberi 60' (yellow card) 81'	BBC Report	McLean (yellow card) 48'; McKenna (yellow card) 52'; Nwakali (yellow card) 53'; Considine (yellow card) 69'; Christie (yellow card) 78'	Attendance: 19,551; Referee: Andrew Dallas

25 February 2018 28	Aberdeen	0–2	Celtic	Pittodrie Stadium
13:30 GMT	McKenna (yellow card) 44'; Árnason (yellow card) 52'; Cosgrove (red card) 84'; Considine (yellow card) 87'	BBC Report	Lustig (yellow card) 29' (yellow-red card) 76'; Dembélé 37'; Tierney 83'; Hendry (yellow card) 90+4'	Attendance: 17,206; Referee: Bobby Madden

10 March 2018 30	Partick Thistle	0–0	Aberdeen	Firhill Stadium
15:00 GMT	Elliott (yellow card) 84'	BBC Report		Attendance: 3,931; Referee: Greg Aitken

17 March 2018 31	Aberdeen	1–0	Dundee	Pittodrie Stadium
15:00 GMT	Shinnie (yellow card) 9' (goal) 35'	BBC Report		Attendance: 15,208; Referee: Willie Collum

31 March 2018 32	Aberdeen	4–1	St Johnstone	Pittodrie Stadium
15:00 GMT	Christie 34'; May 41'; Stewart 51', 82'	BBC Report	Davidson (yellow card) 19'; Anderson (yellow card) 65'; Willock 68'	Attendance: 14,161; Referee: Bobby Madden

3 April 2018 29	Motherwell	0–2	Aberdeen	Fir Park
19:45 BST	Tait (yellow card) 80'	BBC Report	Árnason 65'; McLean 68'	Attendance: 4,127; Referee: Don Robertson

7 April 2018 33	Heart of Midlothian	2–0	Aberdeen	Tynecastle
15:00 BST	Naismith 18' (yellow card) 26'; Milinkovic 20'	BBC Report	Considine (yellow card) 36'; Christie (yellow card) 63'	Attendance: 18,056; Referee: John Beaton

21 April 2018 34	Kilmarnock	0–2	Aberdeen	Rugby Park
15:00 BST	O'Donnell (yellow card) 54'		McLean 37' (yellow card) 54'; Logan 59'	Attendance: 5,067; Referee: Nick Walsh

27 April 2018 35	Aberdeen	2–0	Heart of Midlothian	Pittodrie Stadium
19:45 BST	O'Connor 21'; Mackay-Steven 37'; McKenna (yellow card) 47'; Logan (yellow card) 76'	BBC Report	Berra (yellow card) 81'; Smith (yellow card) 90+1'	Attendance: 14,045; Referee: Andrew Dallas

5 May 2018 36	Aberdeen	0–0	Hibernian	Pittodrie Stadium
15:00 BST	O'Connor (yellow card) 1'; Logan (yellow card) 37'; Mackay-Steven (yellow card) 45'	BBCC Report	Hanlon (yellow card) 28'; McGinn (yellow card) 37'	Attendance: 17,822; Referee: John Beaton

8 May 2018 37	Aberdeen	1–1	Rangers	Pittodrie Stadium
19:45 BST	McLean 14' (pen.); Cosgrove (yellow card) 27'; Shinnie (yellow card) 71'; McKenna (yellow card) 88'; Logan (yellow card) 90'	BBC Sport	Bates (yellow card) 22'; Dorrans (yellow card) 27'; Halliday (yellow card) 38'; Holt (yellow card) 44'; McCrorie 63'; Goss (yellow card) 87'; Morelos (yellow card) 90'	Attendance: 17,745; Referee: Steven McLean

13 May 2018 38	Celtic	0–1	Aberdeen	Celtic Park
12:30 BST	McGregor (yellow card) 66'; Brown (yellow card) 74'; Ajer (yellow card) 80'	BBC Sport	McLean (yellow card) 35'; Considine 47'; Shinnie (yellow card) 80'; Logan (red card) 90+2'	Attendance: 59,048; Referee: Craig Thomson

=== UEFA Europa League ===
Aberdeen qualified for the second preliminary round of the UEFA Europa League by finishing second in the 2016-17 Scottish Premiership.

==== Qualifying phase ====
13 July 2017 1st Leg	Aberdeen (Scotland)	1–1	(Bosnia and Herzegovina) Široki Brijeg	Aberdeen, Scotland
19:45 BST	Christie 18'; Considine (yellow card) 59'	UEFA Report; BBC Report	Marković 69'	Stadium: Pittodrie Stadium; Attendance: 17,067; Referee: Erik Lambrechts (Belgium)

20 July 2017 2nd Leg	Široki Brijeg (Bosnia and Herzegovina)	0–2 (1–3 agg.)	(Scotland) Aberdeen	Široki Brijeg, Bosnia and Herzegovina
19:45 BST		UEFA Report; BBC Report	Christie (yellow card) 45'; Stewart 72'; Mackay-Steven 78'	Stadium: Stadion Pecara; Attendance: 4,800; Referee: Michael Tykgaard (Denmark)

27 July 2017 1st Leg	Aberdeen (Scotland)	2–1	(Cyprus) Apollon Limassol	Aberdeen, Scotland
19:45 BST	Christie 5'; Shinnie (yellow card) 3' (goal) 78'	UEFA Report; BBC Report	Jander 59'; Sachetti (yellow card) 20' (yellow-red card) 71'	Stadium: Pittodrie Stadium; Attendance: 20,085; Referee: Matthias Gestrainus (Finland)

3 August 2017 2nd Leg	Apollon Limassol (Cyprus)	2–0 (3–2 agg.)	(Scotland) Aberdeen	Larnaca, Cyprus
18:00 BST	Schembri 17'; João Pedro (yellow card) 20'; Alef (yellow card) 36'; Stylianou (yellow card) 83'; Zelaya 86' (yellow card) 86'; Bruno Vale (yellow card) 90+7'	UEFA Report; BBC Report	Stockley (yellow card) 43'; Christie (yellow card) 45'; O'Connor (yellow card) 45+1'	Stadium: AEK Arena - Georgios Karapatakis (Note: Apollon Limassol play their home matches at AEK Arena - Georgios Karapatakis, Larnaca, instead of their regular stadium Tsirio Stadium, Limassol.); Referee: Stephan Klossner (Switzerland)

=== Scottish League Cup ===
9 August 2017 Second Round	Hamilton Academical	0–1	Aberdeen	SuperSeal Stadium, Hamilton
19:45 BST	MacKinnon (yellow card) 13'; Tomas (yellow card) 39'; Crawford (yellow card) 80'	BBC Report	McLean 43'; O'Connor (yellow card) 85'	Attendance: 2,768; Referee: Nick Walsh

21 September 2017 Quarter Final	Motherwell	3–0	Aberdeen	Fir Park, Motherwell
19:45 BST	Moult 13', 85'; Hartley 19'; Kipré (yellow card) 42'; Hammell (yellow card) 59'; Cadden (yellow card) 77'; Grimshaw (yellow card) 87'; Fisher (yellow card) 90'	BBC Report	Christie (yellow card) 88'	Attendance: 6,430; Referee: Kevin Clancy

=== Scottish Cup ===
20 January 2018 Fourth Round	Aberdeen	4–1	St Mirren	Pittodrie Stadium
12:15	Rooney 8' (pen.); Christie 18', 33'; Considine (yellow card) 31'; McLean (yellow card) 45'; Mackay-Steven 47'	BBC Report	Reilly 25'	Attendance: 9,848; Referee: Don Robertson

11 February 2018 Fifth Round	Aberdeen	4–2	Dundee United	Pittodrie Stadium
16:30	Rooney 20'; Mackay-Steven 27', 55'; McLean 35'; Considine (yellow card) 36'; Shinnie (yellow card) 37'	BBC Report	Durnan (yellow card) 6'; Stanton (yellow card) 21' (goal) 34'; McMullan 70'; Robson (yellow card) 76'	Attendance: 11,611; Referee: Willie Collum

3 March 2018 Quarter-final	Aberdeen	1–1	Kilmarnock	Pittodrie Stadium
15:00	Shinnie 20'; Logan (yellow card) 39'	BBC Report	Brophy (yellow card) 21'; Power (yellow card) 40'; Broadfoot (yellow card) 54'; Boyd 68' (pen.)	Attendance: 8,739; Referee: Steven McLean

13 March 2018 Quarter-final Replay	Kilmarnock	1–1 (a.e.t.)	Aberdeen	Rugby Park
19:45	McKenzie (yellow card) 23'; Dicker (yellow card) 29'; O'Donnell 96' (yellow card) 110'	BBC Report	McLean (yellow card) 43' (goal) 103' (pen.); Rooney (yellow card) 45+2'; Christie (yellow card) 67'; Logan (yellow card) 67'; McKenna (yellow card) 113'; Shinnie (yellow card) 118'	Attendance: 8,998; Referee: Steven McLean
	Penalties
	Erwin (penalty scored); Brophy (penalty missed); Taylor (penalty missed); O'Donnell (penalty scored); Kiltie (penalty missed)		(penalty scored) Shinnie; (penalty scored) McLean; (penalty missed) McGinn; (penalty scored) Stewart

14 April 2018 Semi-final	Motherwell	3–0	Aberdeen	Hampden Park
12:15	Main 20', 66'; Bowman 22'	BBC Report	O'Connor (yellow card) 57'; Stewart (yellow card) 88'	Attendance: 18,470; Referee: Kevin Clancy

== Squad statistics ==
=== Appearances ===
As of 13 May 2018

No.	Pos	Player	Premiership		Europa League		League Cup		Scottish Cup		Total	
No.	Pos	Player	Apps	Goals	Apps	Goals	Apps	Goals	Apps	Goals	Apps	Goals
1	GK	(England) Joe Lewis	31	0	4	0	2	0	2	0	39	0
2	DF	(England) Shay Logan	37	2	4	0	2	0	4	0	47	2
3	DF	(Scotland) Graeme Shinnie (c)	36	2	4	1	2	0	4	1	46	4
4	DF	(Scotland) Andrew Considine	30+2	3	4	0	2	0	4	0	42	3
5	DF	(Republic of Ireland) Anthony O'Connor	37+1	2	4	0	2	0	5	0	49	2
6	DF	(Scotland) Mark Reynolds	6+6	1	4	0	2	0	1	0	19	1
7	MF	(Scotland) Kenny McLean	37	8	4	0	2	1	4	2	47	11
8	FW	(Scotland) Greg Stewart	16+12	3	3+1	1	0+1	0	2+1	0	36	4
9	FW	(Republic of Ireland) Adam Rooney	16+19	9	1+1	0	0+1	0	5	2	43	11
10	FW	(England) Nicky Maynard	2+18	0	1+3	0	1	0	0+1	0	26	0
11	MF	(Scotland) Gary Mackay-Steven	22+9	5	4	1	1+1	0	3+2	3	42	9
14	DF	(Iceland) Kári Árnason	16+5	3	0+1	0	0+1	0	2	0	25	3
15	FW	(Scotland) Scott Wright	6+8	1	0+2	0	1	0	0	0	17	1
17	MF	(Northern Ireland) Niall McGinn	10+1	2	0	0	0	0	3+2	0	16	2
18	DF	(England) Dominic Ball	9+6	0	0	0	1	0	1+1	0	18	0
19	DF	(Scotland) Scott McKenna	30	3	0	0	0	0	4	0	34	3
20	GK	(Republic of Ireland) Danny Rogers	2+1	0	0	0	0	0	0	0	3	0
21	DF	(Scotland) Daniel Harvie	0+2	0	0	0	0	0	0+1	0	3	0
22	MF	(Scotland) Ryan Christie	28+4	4	4	2	2	0	4	2	42	8
23	MF	(Nigeria) Chidi Nwakali	3+2	0	0	0	0	0	1+2	0	8	0
24	FW	(Scotland) Connor McLennan	0	0	0	0	0	0	0	0	0	0
27	FW	(England) Sam Cosgrove	4+1	0	0	0	0	0	0+1	0	6	0
30	GK	(England) Freddie Woodman	4	0	0	0	0	0	3	0	7	0
31	FW	(Scotland) Bruce Anderson	0	0	0	0	0	0	0	0	0	0
40	GK	(Republic of Ireland) David Craddock	0	0	0	0	0	0	0	0	0	0
44	MF	(Scotland) Dean Campbell	0+1	0	0	0	0	0	0	0	1	0
83	FW	(Scotland) Stevie May	24+4	5	0	0	1	0	2+2	0	33	5
Players who left the club or left on loan during the season
16	MF	(England) Greg Tansey	8+1	0	1+2	0	1+1	0	0	0	14	0
17	FW	(England) Jayden Stockley	0	0	2+1	0	0	0	0	0	3	0
23	MF	(Scotland) Craig Storie	0	0	0	0	0	0	0	0	0	0
25	MF	(Scotland) Frank Ross	1+3	1	0	0	0	0	0	0	4	1
39	FW	(England) Miles Storey	0+1	1	0+1	0	0+1	0	0	0	3	1

=== Goalscorers ===
As of 13 May 2018

Ranking	Nation	Number	Name	Scottish Premiership	Europa League	League Cup	Scottish Cup	Total
1	(Scotland)	7	Kenny McLean	8	0	1	2	11
=	(Republic of Ireland)	9	Adam Rooney	9	0	0	2	11
3	(Scotland)	11	Gary Mackay-Steven	5	1	0	3	9
4	(Scotland)	22	Ryan Christie	4	2	0	2	8
5	(Scotland)	83	Stevie May	5	0	0	0	5
6	(Scotland)	3	Graeme Shinnie	2	1	0	1	4
=	(Scotland)	4	Andrew Considine	4	0	0	0	4
=	(Scotland)	8	Greg Stewart	3	1	0	0	4
9	(Iceland)	14	Kári Árnason	3	0	0	0	3
=	(Scotland)	19	Scott McKenna	3	0	0	0	3
11	(England)	2	Shay Logan	2	0	0	0	2
=	(Republic of Ireland)	5	Anthony O'Connor	2	0	0	0	2
=	(Northern Ireland)	17	Niall McGinn	2	0	0	0	2
14	(Scotland)	6	Mark Reynolds	1	0	0	0	1
=	(Scotland)	15	Scott Wright	1	0	0	0	1
=	(Scotland)	25	Frank Ross	1	0	0	0	1
=	(England)	39	Miles Storey	1	0	0	0	1
			Own Goal	1	0	0	0	1
TOTALS				56	5	1	10	72

=== Disciplinary record ===
As of 13 May 2018

Number	Nation	Position	Name	Premiership		Europa League		League Cup		Scottish Cup		Total	
Number	Nation	Position	Name	Booked	Sent off (straight red)	Booked	Sent off (straight red)	Booked	Sent off (straight red)	Booked	Sent off (straight red)	Booked	Sent off (straight red)
2	(England)	DF	Shay Logan	7	1	0	0	0	0	2	0	9	1
3	(Scotland)	DF	Graeme Shinnie	15	0	1	0	0	0	2	0	18	0
4	(Scotland)	DF	Andrew Considine	6	0	1	0	0	0	2	0	9	0
5	(Republic of Ireland)	DF	Anthony O'Connor	5	0	1	0	1	0	1	0	8	0
7	(Scotland)	MF	Kenny McLean	8	0	0	0	0	0	2	0	10	0
8	(Scotland)	FW	Greg Stewart	1	0	0	0	0	0	1	0	2	0
9	(Republic of Ireland)	FW	Adam Rooney	0	0	0	0	0	0	1	0	1	0
10	(England)	FW	Nicky Maynard	1	0	0	0	0	0	0	0	1	0
11	(Scotland)	MF	Gary Mackay-Steven	2	0	0	0	0	0	0	0	2	0
14	(Iceland)	DF	Kári Árnason	3	0	0	0	0	0	0	0	3	0
15	(Scotland)	MF	Scott Wright	1	0	0	0	0	0	0	0	1	0
16	(England)	MF	Greg Tansey	1	0	0	0	0	0	0	0	1	0
17	(England)	FW	Jayden Stockley	0	0	1	0	0	0	0	0	1	0
18	(England)	DF	Dominic Ball	1	0	0	0	0	0	0	0	1	0
19	(Scotland)	DF	Scott McKenna	7	0	0	0	0	0	1	0	8	0
22	(Scotland)	MF	Ryan Christie	4	1	2	0	1	0	1	0	8	1
23	(Nigeria)	MF	Chidi Nwakali	2	0	0	0	0	0	0	0	2	0
27	(England)	FW	Sam Cosgrove	1	1	0	0	0	0	0	0	1	1
83	(Scotland)	DF	Stevie May	3	0	0	0	0	0	0	0	3	0
			TOTALS	67	3	6	0	2	0	13	0	88	3

== Team statistics ==
=== League table ===
Pos	Team	Pld	W	D	L	GF	GA	GD	Pts	Qualification or relegation (Note: Teams play each other three times (33 matches) before the league is split into two groups (the top six and the bottom six).)
1	Celtic (C)	38	24	10	4	73	25	+48	82	Qualification for the Champions League first qualifying round (Note: Since the winners of the 2017–18 Scottish Cup, Celtic, qualified for European competition based on league position, the spot awarded to the Scottish Cup winners (Europa League second qualifying round) was passed to the second-placed team and the spot awarded to the second-placed team (Europa League first qualifying round) was passed to the fourth-placed team.)
2	Aberdeen	38	22	7	9	56	37	+19	73	Qualification for the Europa League second qualifying round
3	Rangers	38	21	7	10	76	50	+26	70	Qualification for the Europa League first qualifying round
4	Hibernian	38	18	13	7	62	46	+16	67	Qualification for the Europa League first qualifying round
5	Kilmarnock	38	16	11	11	49	47	+2	59	

Source: Soccerway BBC
Rules for classification: 1) Points; 2) Goal difference; 3) Goals scored; 4) Play-off (only if deciding champion, UEFA competitions qualification and second-stage group allocation).
(C) Champions

=== Results by round ===
Round	1	2	3	4	5	6	7	8	9	10	11	12	13	14	15	16	17	18	19	20	21	22	23	24	25	26	27	28	29	30	31	32	33	34	35	36	37	38
Ground	H	A	H	A	A	H	A	H	A	A	H	H	A	H	A	H	A	A	H	A	H	H	A	H	A	H	A	H	A	A	H	H	A	A	H	H	H	A
Result	W	W	W	W	D	D	W	W	W	P	L	W	D	L	W	L	W	W	W	L	W	D	L	W	W	W	L	L	P	D	W	W	L	W	W	D	D	W
Position	3	4	3	1	2	2	2	2	2	2	2	2	2	2	2	3	3	3	2	2	2	2	3	3	2	2	3	3	3	3	3	2	3	3	2	2	2	2

Updated to match(es) played on 13 May 2018 (UTC). Source: Competitive matches
A = Away; H = Home; W = Win; D = Draw; L = Loss; P = Postponed

== Transfers ==
=== Players in ===
Dates	Pos	Nat	Player	From	Fee
9 June 2017	MF	(England)	Greg Tansey	(Scotland) Inverness Caledonian Thistle	Free
6 July 2017	FW	(England)	Nicky Maynard	(England) MK Dons	Free
12 July 2017	MF	(Scotland)	Gary Mackay-Steven	(Scotland) Celtic	£150,000
14 July 2017	DF	(Iceland)	Kári Árnason	(Cyprus) Omonia	Free
10 August 2017	FW	(Scotland)	Stevie May	(England) Preston North End	£400,000
28 December 2017	FW	(Northern Ireland)	Niall McGinn	(South Korea) Gwangju	Free
26 January 2018	DF	(Scotland)	Michael Devlin	(Scotland) Hamilton Academical	£80,000
31 January 2018	FW	(England)	Sam Cosgrove	(England) Carlisle United	£40,000

=== Players out ===
Dates	Pos	Nat	Player	To	Fee
5 May 2017	MF	(Wales)	Dylan Thomas		Released
22 May 2017	MF	(Scotland)	Cammy Smith	(Scotland) St Mirren	Free
31 May 2017	MF	(Scotland)	Jamie Henry	(Scotland) Arbroath	Free
31 May 2017	MF	(Scotland)	Peter Pawlett	(England) MK Dons	Free
17 June 2017	MF	(Republic of Ireland)	Jonny Hayes	(Scotland) Celtic	£1,300,000 + Christie
30 June 2017	GK	(Australia)	Aaron Lennox	(Scotland) Raith Rovers	Free
1 July 2017	MF	(Scotland)	Ryan Jack	(Scotland) Rangers	Free
4 July 2017	FW	(Northern Ireland)	Niall McGinn	(South Korea) Gwangju	Free
5 July 2017	DF	(Wales)	Ash Taylor	(England) Northampton Town	Free
7 July 2017	GK	(Scotland)	Neil Alexander	(Scotland) Livingston	Free
10 July 2017	GK	(Scotland)	Robbie Mutch	(Scotland) Falkirk	Free
22 July 2017	FW	(England)	Joe Nuttall	(England) Blackburn Rovers	Free
11 August 2017	FW	(England)	Miles Storey	(Scotland) Partick Thistle	Undisclosed
31 August 2017	FW	(England)	Jayden Stockley	(England) Exeter City	£100,000
8 September 2017	FW	(Scotland)	Lawrence Shankland	(Scotland) Ayr United	Free
15 November 2017	MF	(Scotland)	Aaron Norris	(Scotland) Peterhead	Free
22 January 2017	MF	(Scotland)	Kenny McLean	(England) Norwich City	£200,000
22 February 2018	MF	(Scotland)	Craig Storie	(Scotland) Brechin City	Free

=== Loans in ===
Date	Pos	Nat	Name	From	Fee
17 June 2017	MF	(Scotland)	Ryan Christie	(Scotland) Celtic	Season Loan (see Hayes)
27 June 2017	FW	(Scotland)	Greg Stewart	(England) Birmingham City	Season Loan
31 August 2017	DF	(England)	Dominic Ball	(England) Rotherham United	Season Loan
10 January 2018	DF	(Nigeria)	Chidi Nwakali	(England) Manchester City	Loan (to end of season)
22 January 2017	MF	(Scotland)	Kenny McLean	(England) Norwich City	Loan
31 January 2017	GK	(England)	Freddie Woodman	(England) Newcastle United	Loan (to end of season)

=== Loans out ===
Date	Pos	Nat	Name	To	Fee
31 August 2017	FW	(Scotland)	Connor McLennan	(Scotland) Brechin City	Development Loan
31 August 2017	FW	(Scotland)	Bruce Anderson	(Scotland) Elgin City	Development Loan
9 January 2018	MF	(England)	Greg Tansey	(Scotland) Ross County	Loan (to end of season)
18 January 2018	MF	(Scotland)	Frank Ross	(Scotland) Greenock Morton	Loan (to end of season)
31 January 2018	DF	(Democratic Republic of the Congo)	Harlain Mbayo	(Scotland) Albion Rovers	Loan (to end of season)

== See also ==
- List of Aberdeen F.C. seasons
