= 2010–11 Scottish Premier Under-19 League =

Clydesdale Bank Under-19 Premier League
- Season: 2010–11
- Matches played: 132
- Goals scored: 434 (3.29 per match)
- Top goalscorer: James Keatings (21) (Celtic)
- Biggest home win: 8-0; Celtic vs Hamilton (21.08.2010); Celtic vs Kilmarnock (20.10.2010)
- Biggest away win: 0-7 Hearts vs Hamilton (16.10.2010)
- Highest scoring: 8-1; Rangers vs Motherwell (26.02.2011)

The 2010–11 Scottish Premier Under 19 League (also known as the Clydesdale Bank Under-19 Premier League due to sponsorship reasons) is the thirteenth season of the Scottish Premier Under-19 League, the highest youth Scottish football league. It commenced in August 2010 and will end in May 2011. The defending champions are Celtic.

== League table ==
Pos	Team	Pld	W	D	L	GF	GA	GD	Pts
1	Celtic (C)	22	17	3	2	74	16	+58	54
2	Heart of Midlothian	22	17	1	4	53	23	+30	52
3	Rangers	22	14	3	5	48	26	+22	45
4	Aberdeen	22	12	5	5	40	32	+8	41
5	Hibernian	22	8	5	9	32	34	−2	29
6	Motherwell	22	8	3	11	27	43	−16	27
7	St Johnstone	22	7	7	8	27	28	−1	28
8	St Mirren	22	8	4	10	22	39	−17	28
9	Dundee United	22	5	5	12	24	37	−13	20
10	Kilmarnock	22	6	2	14	32	61	−29	20
11	Hamilton Academical (R)	22	5	3	14	31	43	−12	18
12	Inverness Caledonian Thistle	22	4	1	17	24	52	−28	13

Updated to match(es) played on 30 April 2011. Source: Scotprem
Rules for classification: 1) points; 2) goal difference; 3) number of goals scored.
Team, which his senior will place 12th in Scottish Premier League at the end of this season will be relegated from Scottish Premier Under-19 League and his place will be for junior team of new SPL club. Bottom SPL club is Hamilton Academical.
(C) Champions; (R) Relegated

== Results ==
Teams play each other twice, once at home, once away

Home \ Away	ABE	CEL	DUN	HAM	HOM	HIB	INV	KIL	MOT	RAN	STJ	STM
Aberdeen		0–3	3–2	2–1	2–1	1–0	3–1	2–1	1–1	2–3	1–1	0–0
Celtic	2–2		2–0	8–0	0–3	3–0	3–0	8–0	3–1	2–4	3–0	5–0
Dundee United	0–1	1–4		1–3	0–0	1–0	2–3	2–2	1–0	1–2	0–3	1–2
Hamilton Academical	1–2	2–3	1–1		0–1	1–2	3–1	1–2	0–3	3–1	1–2	1–2
Heart of Midlothian	5–2	0–1	2–1	0–7		1–0	4–3	6–0	5–0	1–0	1–0	5–0
Hibernian	0–2	1–1	1–2	0–0	0–4		4–1	3–2	3–4	1–4	4–0	3–3
Inverness Caledonian Thistle	3–2	1–6	1–1	1–0	1–3	1–2		1–2	1–2	0–1	0–2	1–2
Kilmarnock	2–3	0–6	1–2	3–1	3–2	2–3	4–2		0–3	1–2	1–3	1–1
Motherwell	2–2	0–4	2–2	1–2	0–1	0–2	2–0	1–2		0–5	1–0	0–1
Rangers	2–1	0–3	3–1	3–0	1–4	1–1	2–0	3–1	8–1		0–0	1–0
St Johnstone	1–2	1–1	0–2	3–3	1–2	0–0	1–0	4–1	0–1	1–1		1–0
St Mirren	0–4	0–3	1–0	1–0	1–2	0–2	1–2	2–1	0–2	2–1	3–3	

Updated to match(es) played on 30 April 2011. Source: Scotprem
Legend: Blue = home team win; Yellow = draw; Red = away team win.
