= Chidiebere Nwakali =

Nigerian footballer

Personal information
- Full name: Chidiebere Chijioke Nwakali
- Date of birth: 26 December 1996 (age 29)
- Place of birth: Owerri, Nigeria
- Height: 1.73 m (5 ft 8 in)
- Position: Defender

Youth career
- Shuttle Sports Academy
- 2014–2015: Manchester City

Senior career*
Years	Team	Apps	(Gls)
2015–2018	Manchester City	0	(0)
2015	→ Málaga B (loan)	2	(0)
2015–2016	→ Girona (loan)	0	(0)
2016	→ Start (loan)	22	(3)
2017	→ Sogndal (loan)	26	(4)
2018	→ Aberdeen (loan)	5	(0)
2018	Raków Częstochowa	1	(0)
2019–2020	Kalmar FF	0	(0)
2020–2021	Tuzlaspor	2	(0)
2021–2023	Tuwaiq		
2023–2024	Al-Jubail		
2024–2025	Al-Sahel		
2025–2026	Tuwaiq		

International career
2013	Nigeria U17	8	(2)
2015	Nigeria U20	1	(0)
Medal record
Men's football
Representing Nigeria
FIFA U-17 World Cup
Winner	2013 United Arab Emirates
- * Club domestic league appearances and goals as of 10:32, 26 December 2023 (UTC)

Chidiebere Chijioke Nwakali (//; born 26 December 1996) is a Nigerian professional footballer who currently plays as a defender.

== Club career ==
On 20 January 2014, Nwakali signed a four-year deal with Manchester City from Shuttle Sports Academy, after impressing with Nigeria under-17s in 2013 FIFA U-17 World Cup. He was also a part of the first team's pre-season tour to USA in July.

On 31 January 2015, Nwakali was loaned to Málaga CF until June 2017, being assigned to the reserves in Tercera División. He made his senior debut on 22 February, starting in a 1–0 home win against Antequera CF.

On 31 August 2015, Nwakali was loaned to Segunda División side Girona FC, in a season-long deal. However, he had to wait until 5 October to be officially available, due to a work permit.

On 31 March 2016, Nwakali terminated his loan with the Catalans, after failing to play a single minute for the club, and immediately joined Tippeligaen side IK Start. On 2 April he made his professional debut, coming on as a second-half substitute for Mathias Rasmussen in a 1–0 home loss against Viking FK.

On 8 February 2017, Nwakali moved to Sogndal Fotball on loan.

He was then loaned to Aberdeen in January 2018.

In summer 2018, he joined Polish club Raków Częstochowa but after just two appearances in all competitions, he left the club for personal reasons.

On 22 January 2019, Kalmar FF announced that they had signed Nwakali on a four-year contract. In February 2020 Nwakali was sacked from Kalmar FF over his failure to return on time from Christmas break

On 21 May, Nwakali traveled to the remote Faroe Islands for a trial with last season's champions, KÍ Klaksvík.

On 9 September 2023, Nwakali joined Al-Jubail.

On 7 September 2025, Nwakali joined Tuwaiq.

== Career statistics ==
As of 27 July 2018

Appearances and goals by club, season and competition
Club	Season	League			National Cup		League Cup		Other		Total	
Club	Season	Division	Apps	Goals	Apps	Goals	Apps	Goals	Apps	Goals	Apps	Goals
Manchester City	2014–15	Premier League	0	0	0	0	0	0	0	0	0	0
Manchester City	2015–16	Premier League	0	0	0	0	0	0	0	0	0	0
Manchester City	2016–17	Premier League	0	0	0	0	0	0	0	0	0	0
Manchester City	2017–18	Premier League	0	0	0	0	0	0	0	0	0	0
Manchester City	Total		0	0	0	0	0	0	0	0	0	0
Girona (loan)	2015–16	Segunda División	0	0	0	0	–		0	0	0	0
IK Start (loan)	2016	Tippeligaen	22	3	1	0	—		—		23	3
Sogndal (loan)	2017	Eliteserien	26	4	1	0	—		1 (Note: Appearance in the Eliteserien relegation play-offs)	0	28	4
Aberdeen (loan)	2017–18	Scottish Premiership	5	0	3	0	0	0	0	0	8	0
Career total			53	7	5	0	0	0	1	0	59	7

== Honours ==
Nigeria U17

- FIFA U-17 World Cup: 2013
