= 2014–15 SPFL Development League =

SPFL Development League
- Season: 2014–15
- Champions: Aberdeen
- Top goalscorer: Lawrence Shankland (29)

The 2014–15 SPFL Development League was the 17th season of the highest youth Scottish football league and the first season under the new "Development League" format. It began in August 2014 and ended in May 2015, with Aberdeen winning the league championship.

== Changes ==
The league was again expanded, this time from 16 teams to 17 teams. It retained all 16 of the sides from the previous season, with newly promoted Scottish Premiership club Dundee admitted to the league. Eligible players were those born in 1995 or later, but five players of any age were permitted in the matchday squad of 18.

== League table ==
Pos	Team	Pld	W	D	L	GF	GA	GD	Pts
1	Aberdeen	32	25	2	5	87	37	+50	77
2	Celtic	32	21	6	5	70	31	+39	69
3	Hamilton Academical	32	20	2	10	78	42	+36	62
4	Rangers	32	17	6	9	67	46	+21	57
5	Hibernian	32	13	12	7	75	54	+21	51
6	Falkirk	32	15	6	11	46	46	0	51
7	Partick Thistle	32	14	4	14	58	72	−14	46
8	Motherwell	32	13	6	13	61	50	+11	45
9	St Johnstone	32	12	6	14	40	46	−6	42
10	Dundee United	32	12	4	16	57	60	−3	40
11	Dundee	32	12	4	16	40	57	−17	40
12	Kilmarnock	32	11	6	15	49	59	−10	39
13	St Mirren	32	10	9	13	44	54	−10	39
14	Dunfermline Athletic	32	10	3	19	52	59	−7	33
15	Heart of Midlothian	32	8	3	21	46	78	−32	27
16	Ross County	32	4	13	15	54	82	−28	25
17	Inverness Caledonian Thistle	32	5	8	19	33	84	−51	23

Updated to match(es) played on unknown. Source: SPFL
Rules for classification: 1) points; 2) goal difference; 3) number of goals scored.

=== Matches ===
Teams played each other twice, once at home, once away.

Home \ Away	ABE	CEL	DND	DUN	DNF	FAL	HAM	HOM	HIB	INV	KIL	MOT	PAR	RAN	ROS	STJ	STM
Aberdeen		2–1	3–0	4–5	3–1	5–1	1–2	2–0	4–0	1–1	5–4	5–1	2–1	1–3	3–0	3–0	3–0
Celtic	0–3		2–1	2–0	1–1	2–0	2–0	3–1	1–1	5–0	4–1	2–0	3–2	0–1	1–0	2–0	1–1
Dundee	3–2	0–0		3–1	0–5	3–2	3–1	2–1	1–2	3–3	1–2	1–0	1–2	1–0	5–1	1–1	0–1
Dundee United	0–2	2–2	4–1		1–3	0–1	2–0	0–1	0–2	2–0	0–1	3–2	1–3	1–2	9–2	2–1	2–0
Dunfermline Athletic	1–2	0–3	0–1	0–1		1–0	1–3	1–4	0–1	5–0	0–2	2–2	1–2	3–2	3–1	0–1	1–2
Falkirk	1–2	0–0	2–1	0–1	0–2		0–0	2–1	2–2	2–0	1–0	0–3	3–1	2–0	5–2	4–1	2–1
Hamilton Academical	4–1	0–2	2–0	2–0	6–1	8–1		1–2	1–1	7–1	3–0	1–0	6–1	3–0	2–0	2–1	5–1
Heart of Midlothian	0–4	1–3	0–0	3–6	2–1	1–2	1–3		1–2	6–1	1–1	2–5	2–3	0–3	1–6	3–1	0–2
Hibernian	1–1	2–3	7–0	6–2	3–2	2–2	1–4	2–3		3–2	7–0	1–3	4–2	4–1	1–1	1–1	2–2
Inverness Caledonian Thistle	0–3	0–3	1–2	1–0	3–2	0–3	1–4	1–3	3–2		2–1	1–4	0–2	3–3	1–1	1–2	1–1
Kilmarnock	1–3	2–3	2–0	3–4	0–0	0–1	2–1	4–0	1–2	5–1		0–4	2–1	1–1	3–3	0–2	2–0
Motherwell	1–3	2–0	3–4	1–0	2–1	0–1	4–0	4–1	2–2	1–1	1–2		2–0	1–1	2–2	2–3	1–4
Partick Thistle	1–4	0–2	0–1	3–3	1–6	4–3	4–2	3–2	2–2	2–2	1–1	2–1		2–1	1–0	4–3	3–2
Rangers	2–3	1–6	3–1	4–1	4–0	0–0	4–0	5–1	1–4	1–0	2–1	3–0	3–2		6–1	3–0	1–1
Ross County	0–1	2–6	2–0	3–3	3–4	2–1	2–3	1–1	2–2	1–2	2–2	1–1	3–1	2–2		2–2	2–4
St Johnstone	1–3	1–2	1–0	0–0	2–1	0–1	1–0	2–0	2–1	4–0	3–2	0–1	1–2	0–1	2–2		1–0
St Mirren	1–3	4–3	1–0	2–1	1–3	1–1	1–2	2–1	2–2	0–0	0–1	1–5	3–0	1–3	2–2	0–0	

Source: SPFL
Legend: Blue = home team win; Yellow = draw; Red = away team win.

== Top scorers ==
As of 18 May 2015

Rank	Scorer	Team	Goals
1	Lawrence Shankland	Aberdeen	29
2	Eamonn Brophy	Hamilton Academical	23
3	Ryan Hardie	Rangers	19
4	Lewis Allan	Hibernian	13
4	Cammy Smith	Aberdeen	13
6	Dom Thomas	Motherwell	12
6	James Thomas	Dunfermline Athletic	12
