= 2013–14 SPFL U20 League =

SPFL U20 League
- Season: 2013–14
- Champions: Celtic
- Top goalscorer: Jason Cummings (22)

The 2013–14 SPFL Under 20 League was the sixteenth season of the highest youth Scottish football league, the second season under the new under 20 format and the first season since the inception of the Scottish Professional Football League. It began in August 2013 ended in May 2014. Celtic won the league championship, one point ahead of nearest challengers Rangers.

== Changes ==
This year the league was again expanded, this time from 15 teams to 16 teams. It retained 14 of the sides from the previous season, with newly promoted Scottish Premiership club Partick Thistle replacing relegated Dundee. Scottish League One side Rangers also returned to the league.

== League table ==
| Pos | Team | Pld | W | D | L | GF | GA | GD | Pts |
|---|---|---|---|---|---|---|---|---|---|
| 1 | Celtic | 30 | 21 | 2 | 7 | 60 | 27 | +33 | 65 |
| 2 | Rangers | 30 | 19 | 7 | 4 | 62 | 30 | +32 | 64 |
| 3 | Hibernian | 30 | 17 | 8 | 5 | 71 | 38 | +33 | 59 |
| 4 | Hamilton Academical | 30 | 15 | 6 | 9 | 56 | 45 | +11 | 51 |
| 5 | Motherwell | 30 | 15 | 3 | 12 | 61 | 54 | +7 | 48 |
| 6 | Inverness Caledonian Thistle | 30 | 13 | 4 | 13 | 56 | 51 | +5 | 43 |
| 7 | Kilmarnock | 30 | 11 | 6 | 13 | 48 | 53 | −5 | 39 |
| 8 | Falkirk | 30 | 10 | 9 | 11 | 48 | 61 | −13 | 39 |
| 9 | Aberdeen | 30 | 11 | 5 | 14 | 50 | 51 | −1 | 38 |
| 10 | Dunfermline Athletic | 30 | 10 | 6 | 14 | 51 | 53 | −2 | 36 |
| 11 | St Johnstone | 30 | 9 | 8 | 13 | 51 | 58 | −7 | 35 |
| 12 | Dundee United | 30 | 10 | 4 | 16 | 40 | 43 | −3 | 34 |
| 13 | Ross County | 30 | 10 | 4 | 16 | 43 | 63 | −20 | 34 |
| 14 | Partick Thistle | 30 | 9 | 6 | 15 | 37 | 61 | −24 | 33 |
| 15 | St Mirren | 30 | 9 | 5 | 16 | 37 | 53 | −16 | 32 |
| 16 | Heart of Midlothian | 30 | 7 | 5 | 18 | 40 | 70 | −30 | 26 |

Source: SPFL
Rules for classification: 1) points; 2) goal difference; 3) number of goals scored.

=== Matches ===
Teams played each other twice, once at home, once away.

| Home \ Away | ABE | CEL | DUN | DNF | FAL | HAM | HOM | HIB | INV | KIL | MOT | PAR | RAN | ROS | STJ | STM |
|---|---|---|---|---|---|---|---|---|---|---|---|---|---|---|---|---|
| Aberdeen | | 2–2 | 2–1 | 3–0 | 0–2 | 3–1 | 4–0 | 1–6 | 0–1 | 3–0 | 3–2 | 2–3 | 1–2 | 1–3 | 1–4 | 2–3 |
| Celtic | 1–2 | | 1–0 | 2–1 | 2–0 | 3–0 | 2–0 | 0–2 | 1–3 | 2–1 | 3–0 | 4–0 | 2–0 | 5–0 | 2–2 | 3–2 |
| Dundee United | 1–0 | 0–2 | | 0–0 | 0–1 | 2–4 | 5–0 | 1–2 | 2–3 | 1–0 | 3–2 | 2–1 | 2–2 | 1–3 | 0–1 | 3–0 |
| Dunfermline Athletic | 2–0 | 1–0 | 3–0 | | 2–2 | 3–4 | 5–0 | 3–3 | 0–3 | 2–3 | 4–3 | 1–1 | 0–2 | 3–0 | 3–0 | 3–2 |
| Falkirk | 2–2 | 2–3 | 3–1 | 1–0 | | 3–1 | 4–2 | 2–2 | 2–0 | 4–2 | 1–5 | 0–4 | 0–4 | 2–1 | 1–1 | 0–0 |
| Hamilton Academical | 2–1 | 1–3 | 1–0 | 2–0 | 1–1 | | 5–1 | 0–4 | 3–2 | 0–1 | 0–0 | 1–1 | 0–0 | 0–1 | 3–0 | 4–0 |
| Heart of Midlothian | 0–5 | 2–1 | 0–2 | 0–2 | 1–1 | 2–3 | | 2–2 | 2–1 | 0–2 | 3–0 | 5–1 | 1–4 | 4–0 | 4–2 | 1–3 |
| Hibernian | 2–1 | 1–0 | 1–1 | 7–1 | 4–2 | 1–1 | 3–2 | | 2–3 | 1–1 | 2–1 | 2–0 | 0–0 | 5–0 | 1–2 | 0–2 |
| Inverness Caledonian Thistle | 2–4 | 2–3 | 3–2 | 3–1 | 2–2 | 0–1 | 2–0 | 1–3 | | 3–0 | 2–3 | 3–2 | 1–2 | 3–0 | 3–0 | 1–0 |
| Kilmarnock | 1–2 | 0–1 | 1–3 | 0–0 | 3–2 | 3–3 | 2–1 | 3–3 | 3–3 | | 0–1 | 1–0 | 1–2 | 5–1 | 3–0 | 1–0 |
| Motherwell | 3–0 | 0–5 | 0–0 | 2–1 | 4–3 | 2–4 | 3–2 | 0–3 | 2–0 | 2–3 | | 4–1 | 1–2 | 1–2 | 3–2 | 2–0 |
| Partick Thistle | 1–1 | 1–0 | 0–3 | 2–1 | 1–1 | 1–3 | 1–2 | 2–0 | 4–2 | 2–0 | 0–5 | | 0–3 | 1–0 | 2–2 | 1–1 |
| Rangers | 0–2 | 0–2 | 1–0 | 5–4 | 5–0 | 2–1 | 1–1 | 2–0 | 2–2 | 2–0 | 1–2 | 4–0 | | 1–0 | 2–2 | 4–0 |
| Ross County | 1–1 | 1–2 | 2–3 | 1–1 | 3–0 | 1–3 | 1–1 | 2–4 | 2–0 | 5–0 | 0–3 | 4–0 | 2–3 | | 2–1 | 3–3 |
| St Johnstone | 3–1 | 0–1 | 3–1 | 0–3 | 1–2 | 1–3 | 2–0 | 1–3 | 2–2 | 2–2 | 3–3 | 4–1 | 2–2 | 6–1 | | 2–0 |
| St Mirren | 0–0 | 1–2 | 1–0 | 2–1 | 4–2 | 3–1 | 1–1 | 1–2 | 1–0 | 2–6 | 1–2 | 0–3 | 1–2 | 0–1 | 3–0 | |

Source: SPFL
Legend: Blue = home team win; Yellow = draw; Red = away team win.

== Top scorers ==
| Rank | Scorer | Team | Goals |
|---|---|---|---|
| 1 | Jason Cummings | Hibernian | 22 |
| 2 | Kyle MacLeod | Ross County | 16 |
| 2 | Chris Kane | St Johnstone | 16 |
| 4 | Adam Evans | Inverness Caledonian Thistle | 13 |
| 4 | Craig Moore | Motherwell | 13 |
| 4 | Tony Dingwall | Ross County | 13 |
| 7 | Ryan Christie | Inverness Caledonian Thistle | 12 |
| 7 | Chris Duggan | Partick Thistle | 12 |
| 9 | Denny Johnstone | Celtic | 11 |
| 9 | Andy Ryan | Hamilton Academical | 11 |
