= 2011–12 Scottish Premier Under-19 League =

Clydesdale Bank Under-19 Premier League
- Season: 2011–12
- Champions: Celtic
- Relegated: Dunfermline Athletic
- Matches played: 132
- Goals scored: 463 (3.51 per match)
- Top goalscorer: 15 goals Declan McManus (Aberdeen)
- Biggest home win: 6-1 Rangers vs Motherwell (30.03.2012); 6-1 Celtic vs Inverness CT (07.02.2012); 5-0 Celtic vs Dundee United (03.09.2011)
- Biggest away win: 1-7; Inverness CT vs Motherwell (10.02.2012)
- Highest scoring: 1-7; Inverness CT vs Motherwell (10.02.2012)

The 2011–12 Scottish Premier Under 19 League (also known as the Clydesdale Bank Under-19 Premier League due to sponsorship reasons) was the fourteenth season of the Scottish Premier Under-19 League, the highest youth Scottish football league. It commenced in August 2011 and finished in May 2012. The defending champions were Celtic, who retained the title for the third year running.

== League table ==
Pos	Team	Pld	W	D	L	GF	GA	GD	Pts
1	Celtic (C)	22	18	3	1	66	18	+48	57
2	Heart of Midlothian	22	16	1	5	45	27	+18	49
3	Hibernian	22	14	2	6	49	30	+19	44
4	Aberdeen	22	11	6	5	42	23	+19	39
5	Rangers	22	11	4	7	42	28	+14	37
6	Motherwell	22	10	6	6	44	37	+7	36
7	Kilmarnock	22	8	0	14	40	51	−11	24
8	St Johnstone	22	7	3	12	33	45	−12	24
9	St Mirren	22	6	5	11	27	34	−7	23
10	Dunfermline Athletic (R)	22	6	1	15	22	47	−25	19
11	Dundee United	22	4	2	16	30	56	−26	14
12	Inverness Caledonian Thistle	22	3	3	16	23	67	−44	12

Updated to match(es) played on 4 May 2012. Source: Scotprem
Rules for classification: 1) points; 2) goal difference; 3) number of goals scored.
Team, which his senior will place 12th in Scottish Premier League at the end of this season, will be relegated from Scottish Premier Under-19 League and his place will be for youth team of new SPL club.
(C) Champions; (R) Relegated

== Results ==
Teams play each other twice, once at home, once away

Home \ Away	ABE	CEL	DUN	DNF	HOM	HIB	INV	KIL	MOT	RAN	STJ	STM
Aberdeen		1–1	4–0	2–0	1–2	1–2	2–2	3–1	3–1	1–0	4–0	3–0
Celtic	4–2		5–0	2–0	1–2	4–0	6–1	4–1	1–1	1–1	3–1	1–0
Dundee United	1–3	0–1		3–0	0–2	0–1	3–0	1–2	2–3	2–3	2–2	2–5
Dunfermline Athletic	1–3	0–4	3–2		1–0	0–4	2–2	2–1	1–2	1–4	0–2	3–1
Heart of Midlothian	2–1	0–2	4–2	1–0		3–2	5–2	2–0	2–2	4–3	1–2	2–0
Hibernian	2–2	3–4	3–0	2–1	2–0		3–0	1–2	3–3	2–0	3–1	1–2
Inverness Caledonian Thistle	2–1	0–5	3–0	2–4	0–2	1–3		2–4	1–7	0–2	1–1	0–3
Kilmarnock	1–2	1–5	3–4	3–0	2–4	0–3	2–3		1–3	1–2	3–2	2–1
Motherwell	0–0	2–5	2–1	0–1	1–2	3–0	1–0	3–2		1–1	2–3	1–1
Rangers	1–1	0–3	3–0	2–0	0–2	2–5	4–0	2–0	6–1		4–1	2–1
St Johnstone	0–2	1–2	1–2	3–2	3–1	1–2	5–1	1–4	0–3	1–0		1–2
St Mirren	0–0	1–2	3–3	2–0	0–2	0–2	2–0	1–4	1–2	0–0	1–1	

Updated to match(es) played on 4 May 2012. Source: Scotprem
Legend: Blue = home team win; Yellow = draw; Red = away team win.
