= 2012–13 Scottish Premier Under-20 League =

Clydesdale Bank Under-20 Premier League
- Season: 2012–13
- Champions: Celtic Under-19s

The 2012–13 Scottish Premier Under 20 League (also known as the Clydesdale Bank Under-20 Premier League due to sponsorship reasons) was the fifteenth season of the Scottish Premier under-20 League, the highest youth Scottish football league, and also the first season under the new under 20 format. It began in August 2012 and ended in May 2013.

== Changes ==
The league was converted from under-19 to under-20 and was expanded from 12 to 15 teams. Dundee were promoted to take Rangers' place in the Premier League, due to the latter losing SPL membership. In addition, the under-20 sides of the relegated Scottish Premier League club Dunfermline Athletic and the clubs finishing third and fourth in the Scottish Football League took up a place in the new league. A position in the league for teams outside the SPL was based on their youth academy's elite status.

The definition of an under-20 player is a player who has not attained the age of 19 years on 31 December of the year before the relevant season commences. Additionally, a limited number of overage players are allowed to compete in each fixture. The under-20 league was adopted in order to promote the development of youth footballers and to assist in their progression to the full professional game, when compared to the under-18 or under-19 format.

== League table ==
Pos	Team	Pld	W	D	L	GF	GA	GD	Pts
1	Celtic (C)	28	20	4	4	55	21	+34	64
2	Aberdeen	28	17	6	5	77	34	+43	57
3	Hibernian	28	14	6	8	57	36	+21	48
4	St Mirren	28	14	5	9	53	49	+4	47
5	Dundee United	28	14	3	11	54	41	+13	45
6	Inverness Caledonian Thistle	28	13	5	10	50	47	+3	44
7	St Johnstone	28	13	2	13	41	50	−9	41
8	Hamilton Academical	28	10	8	10	42	47	−5	38
9	Heart of Midlothian	28	10	7	11	46	49	−3	37
10	Dunfermline Athletic	28	11	3	14	44	52	−8	36
11	Kilmarnock	28	11	1	16	47	65	−18	34
12	Falkirk	28	9	5	14	29	32	−3	32
13	Motherwell	28	9	4	15	48	56	−8	31
14	Ross County	28	6	5	17	29	52	−23	23
15	Dundee	28	5	4	19	31	72	−41	19

Updated to match(es) played on unknown. Source: Scottish Premier League
Rules for classification: 1) points; 2) goal difference; 3) number of goals scored.
(C) Champions

=== Matches ===
Teams played each other twice, once at home, once away.

Home \ Away	ABE	CEL	DND	DUN	DNF	FAL	HAM	HOM	HIB	INV	KIL	MOT	ROS	STJ	STM
Aberdeen		0–1	6–0	2–0	4–1	0–0	4–1	6–1	3–1	2–1	6–1	5–1	2–1	6–0	4–0
Celtic	1–1		3–0	3–2	1–0	1–0	4–1	3–0	1–2	1–1	2–0	3–1	3–0	1–2	1–0
Dundee	1–4	0–4		0–4	1–2	2–1	0–0	1–2	1–3	1–3	1–3	1–2	2–1	0–1	1–1
Dundee United	1–1	1–1	5–1		1–0	1–0	2–3	0–2	4–2	1–2	4–1	3–0	2–0	2–3	5–2
Dunfermline Athletic	0–1	1–2	0–5	1–2		1–3	4–1	3–2	1–1	3–2	3–1	2–1	0–2	0–3	3–1
Falkirk	3–3	0–1	3–0	1–0	1–0		1–1	0–2	0–2	0–2	4–1	1–1	2–1	1–2	0–1
Hamilton Academical	2–0	1–3	4–0	1–0	3–3	2–1		2–2	0–0	2–2	1–0	2–3	2–2	2–0	0–2
Heart of Midlothian	1–3	0–0	3–3	2–3	2–3	0–1	1–2		1–0	1–1	1–1	4–2	2–0	0–4	3–1
Hibernian	4–1	2–1	3–1	2–3	0–2	1–0	0–1	2–2		0–0	5–1	1–4	1–1	4–0	8–1
Inverness Caledonian Thistle	2–3	0–1	1–1	1–5	1–0	1–2	3–1	3–2	2–3		2–1	1–2	0–2	4–0	3–2
Kilmarnock	3–0	1–3	3–4	3–0	5–1	1–0	3–2	0–3	0–3	5–2		4–2	2–0	1–4	0–1
Motherwell	0–4	1–3	2–3	2–3	0–0	1–1	3–1	1–1	1–2	2–3	4–2		1–0	5–1	0–1
Ross County	2–2	0–2	2–0	0–0	1–6	1–0	1–2	2–4	1–3	2–3	0–1	2–1		0–0	3–4
St Johnstone	3–2	1–3	5–1	1–0	1–3	0–1	2–1	2–0	2–1	0–1	2–3	0–4	0–1		1–2
St Mirren	2–2	3–2	1–0	4–0	4–1	3–2	1–1	0–2	1–1	2–3	5–0	2–1	5–1	1–1	

Source: Scottish Premier League
Legend: Blue = home team win; Yellow = draw; Red = away team win.
