= SPFL Development League =

- Founded: 1998; 28 years ago (as Scottish Premier under-18 League)
- Country: Scotland
- Divisions: 1
- Number of clubs: 17
- Level on pyramid: 1
- Domestic cup: Scottish Youth Cup
- Current champions: Hibernian (2017–18)

The SPFL Development League was the top level of youth football in Scotland, which was contested in various formats between 1998 and 2018.

== History ==
A youth league was founded as the Scottish Premier under-18 League in 1998. Clubs fielded under-18 teams, with the Scottish Premier Reserve League originally being an under-21 league. The competition was changed in 2003 when it became the Scottish Premier under-19 League. The teams played 22 matches rather than 30.

For the 2012–13 season, the competition changed again, this time to the Scottish Premier under-20 league, there were 15 teams, and teams played 28 matches per season. With the inception of the Scottish Professional Football League for the 2013–14 season, the league become the SPFL U20 League and the number of teams increased to 16. Teams were allowed to field two over-age outfield players and an overage goalkeeper.

The league was renamed the SPFL Development League in 2014, with the number of teams increased to 17. At this time two regional leagues were also introduced, with eight clubs competing in the Development League West and nine clubs competing in the Development League East. The restriction on over-age players was relaxed, with teams now permitted to use five older players in a matchday squad of 18.

The league was dissolved in 2018 and replaced by the SPFL Reserve Leagues.

=== European competition ===
From 2015 onwards, the UEFA Youth League provides a qualification route for 'domestic youth champions', in addition to clubs whose senior team reaches the UEFA Champions League group stage. As the age group for the Development League is older than that of the UEFA Group League, Scotland's representative will be the winner of the Under-17 league, which plays competitive fixtures however does not reveal the results and tables publicly to minimise the scrutiny on the young players. In 2015, 2016, and 2017, the winners of the Under-17 league were Celtic; in 2018, Hamilton won the title, and Rangers were the 2019 champions.

== Winners ==
=== SFL Youth League ===
Season	Winner	Runner-up
1993–94	Aberdeen	Celtic
1994–95	Celtic	Aberdeen
1995–96	Rangers	Celtic
1996–97	Dundee United	Celtic
1997–98	Aberdeen	Dundee United

=== SPL Under-18 League ===
Season	Winner	Runner-up
1998–99	Aberdeen	Celtic
1999–00	Celtic	Dundee United
2000–01	Heart of Midlothian	Livingston
2001–02	Rangers	Celtic
2002–03	Celtic	Rangers

=== SPL Under-19 League ===
Season	Winner	Runner-up
2003–04	Celtic	Rangers
2004–05	Celtic	Motherwell
2005–06	Celtic	Motherwell
2006–07	Rangers	Celtic
2007–08	Rangers	Celtic
2008–09	Hibernian	Heart of Midlothian
2009–10	Celtic	Motherwell
2010–11	Celtic	Heart of Midlothian
2011–12	Celtic	Heart of Midlothian

=== SPFL Under-20 League ===
Season	Winner	Runner-up
2012–13	Celtic	Aberdeen
2013–14	Celtic	Rangers

=== SPFL Development League ===
Season	Winner	Runner-up
2014–15	Aberdeen	Celtic
2015–16	Celtic	Hamilton Academical
2016–17	Ross County	Hamilton Academical
2017–18	Hibernian	Dundee

== Other Competitions (SFL / SPFL era) ==
Although the Scottish Premier League (SPL) superseded the Scottish Football League (SFL) as the top division in 1998, the SFL continued to run an under-18 league until 2003, when the age group was split into under-17's and under-19's. The SFL also ran a cup competition (not to be confused with the SFA Youth Cup) for the various age groups. After the SFL ceased operation in 2013, with the foundation of the Scottish Professional Football League (SPFL) in 2013, an under-19 league and cup competition was run alongside the new under-20 league. There were also West and East Development Divisions operating under the main SPFL Development League between 2014 and 2018. Club Academy Scotland (CAS), organised and managed by the Scottish Football Association (SFA), began operating youth leagues with under-17 the top age group in 2014. The under-17 age range was raised to under-18 by CAS in 2018.

Season	Competition	Winner
1998–99	SFL Under-18 Youth Division A	Aberdeen
1998–99	SFL Under-18 Youth Division B	Falkirk
1999–2000	SFL Under-18 Youth Division A	Celtic
1999–2000	SFL Under-18 Youth Division B	Airdrieonians
1999–2000	SFL Under-18 Youth Division C	Falkirk
2000–01	No competition	
2001–02	SFL Under-18 Youth Division	Ayr United
2001–02	SFL Under-18 Youth League Cup	Stirling Albion
2002–03	SFL Under-18 Youth Division	Ayr United
2002–03	SFL Under-18 Youth League Cup	Ross County
2003–04	SFL Under-19 Youth Division	Ross County
2003–04	SFL Under-19 Youth League Cup	Queen's Park
2003–04	SFL Under-17 Youth Division	Falkirk
2003–04	SFL Under-17 Youth League Cup	Hamilton Academical
2004–05	SFL Under-19 Youth Division	St Johnstone
2004–05	SFL Under-19 Youth League Cup	Queen's Park
2004–05	SFL Under-17 Youth Division	Morton
2004–05	SFL Under-17 Youth League Cup	Ross County
2005–06	SFL Under-19 Youth Division	Dundee
2005–06	SFL Under-19 Youth League Cup	St Johnstone
2005–06	SFL Under-17 Youth Division	Stenhousemuir
2005–06	SFL Under-17 Youth League Cup	Raith Rovers
2006–07	SFL Under-19 Youth Division	Ross County
2006–07	SFL Under-19 Youth League Cup	East Fife
2006–07	SFL Under-17 Youth Division	Airdrie United
2006–07	SFL Under-17 Youth League Cup	Airdrie United
2007–08	SFL Under-19 Youth Division	Livingston
2007–08	SFL Under-19 Youth League Cup	Raith Rovers
2007–08	SFL Under-17 Youth Division	Queen's Park
2007–08	SFL Under-17 Youth League Cup	Cowdenbeath
2008–09	SFL Under-19 Youth Division	Livingston
2008–09	SFL Under-19 Youth League Cup	Livingston
2008–09	SFL Under-17 Youth Division	St Johnstone
2008–09	SFL Under-17 Youth League Cup	Queen of the South

Season	Competition	Winner
2009–10	SFL Under-19 Youth Division	Livingston
2009–10	SFL Under-19 Youth League Cup	Partick Thistle
2009–10	SFL Under-17 Youth Division	Queen's Park
2009–10	SFL Under-17 Youth League Cup	Queen's Park
2010–11	SFL Under-19 Youth Division	Livingston
2010–11	SFL Under-17 Youth Division	Ayr United
2010–11	SFL Under-17 Youth League Cup	Livingston
2011–12	SFL Under-19 Youth Division	
2011–12	SFL Under-19 Youth League Cup	Stenhousemuir
2011–12	SFL Under-17 Youth Division	Livingston
2011–12	SFL Under-17 Youth League Cup	Livingston
2012–13	SFL Under-19 Youth Division	
2012–13	SFL Under-19 Youth League Cup	Hamilton Academical
2012–13	SFL Under-17 Youth Division	
2012–13	SFL Under-17 Youth League Cup	
2013–14	SPFL Under-19 League	Celtic
2013–14	SPFL Under-19 League Cup	Celtic
2014–15	SPFL Development League West	Airdrieonians
2014–15	SPFL Development League East	Forfar Athletic
2014–15	CAS Under-17 Elite Youth League	Celtic
2015–16	SPFL Development League West	Greenock Morton
2015–16	SPFL Development League East	Stirling Albion
2015–16	CAS Under-17 Elite Youth League	Celtic
2015–16	CAS Under-17 Development League	St Johnstone
2016–17	SPFL Development League West	Queen of the South
2016–17	SPFL Development League East	Raith Rovers
2016–17	CAS Under-17 Elite Youth League	Celtic
2016–17	CAS Under-17 Development League	St Johnstone
2017–18	SPFL Development League West	Greenock Morton
2017–18	SPFL Development League East	Raith Rovers
2017–18	CAS Under-17 Elite Youth League	Hamilton Academical
2017–18	CAS Under-17 Development League	Inverness CT
2018–19	CAS Under-18 Elite Youth League	Rangers
2021–22	CAS Under-18 Elite Youth League	Hibernian
2022–23	CAS Under-18 Elite Youth League	Hamilton Academical
2023–24	CAS Under-18 Elite Youth League	Aberdeen
2024–25	CAS Under-18 Elite Youth League	Hibernian
