= Aberdeen F.C. Reserves and Academy =

Aberdeen Reserves
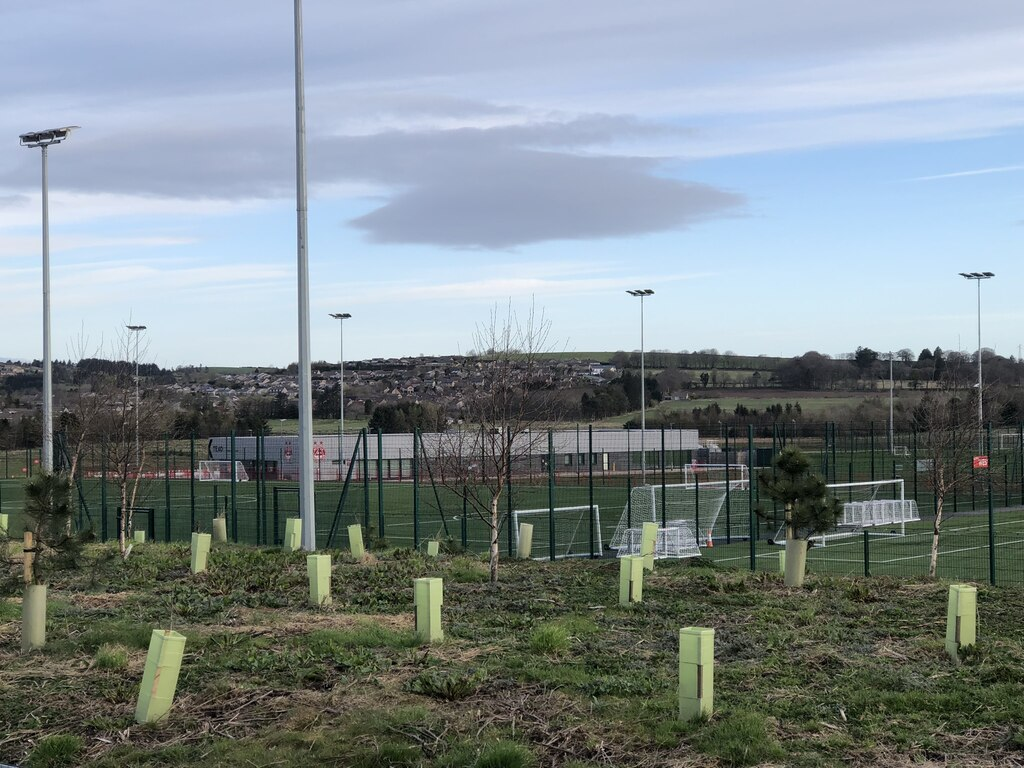
- Full name: Aberdeen Football Club Reserve Squad
- Ground: Various, primarily Balmoral Stadium, Cove Bay
- Chairman: Dave Cormack
- League: SPFL Reserve League (withdrew)
- Website: www.afc.co.uk
Home colours

In addition to their first team competing in the Scottish Premiership, Aberdeen Football Club also maintain further teams for younger age groups playing in competitions such as the Scottish Challenge Cup and the Scottish Youth Cup within the club's academy.

== Competitions ==
=== Reserves ===
In the early 1950s, reserve teams were incorporated into the third tier of the senior Scottish Football League, with Aberdeen 'A' taking part for six seasons of the arrangement. Aberdeen fielded a team for many years in various separate reserve competitions culminating in the Scottish Premier Reserve League, which was abandoned in 2009.

In July 2018, it was reported that reserve leagues would be reintroduced in lieu of the development leagues that had been in place since 2009 (below). The top tier of the new SPFL Reserve League featured 18 clubs, whilst a second-tier reserve League comprised nine clubs. Other than a minimum age of 16, no age restrictions applied to the leagues. Aberdeen intimated at the end of its first season (2018–19) that they would withdraw from the Reserve League to play a variety of challenge matches, several others did likewise. They later entered a small league (under-21 plus three overage) along with three other Scottish clubs and Brentford and Huddersfield Town from the English leagues.

=== Youths ===
Prior to the introduction of the Scottish Premier League in 1998, the Under-20s previously competed in the youth league administered by the Scottish Football League. An under-20 side then took part in the SPFL Development League until it was disbanded in 2018. They won the last edition of the SFL competition and the first under the SPL, but they only won it once more (in 2014–15).

From 2015 onwards, it has been possible for the Aberdeen Academy to participate in the UEFA Youth League by the under-17/under-18 side winning the previous season's league at that age group; however this has not yet been achieved.

For the 2016-17 edition of the Scottish Challenge Cup, under-20 teams (later under-21) of clubs in the Premiership were granted entry to compete against adult teams for the first time in the modern era. Aberdeen U20 won their opening round against Formartine United of the Highland League but lost in the next round to Forfar Athletic of the fourth tier.

== Facilities ==
Their fixtures are normally played at the club and community training facilities, situated in Kingsford, Cormack Park.

== Academy background ==
Aberdeen's geographical isolation from much of Scotland's population is an advantage to the Dons' player recruitment to some extent, as they are the only major club in a region of over 500,000 people so generally have the pick of the promising youngsters in the city and shire. The relative economic power of the club also means that players from the Central Belt are frequently persuaded to move north, and over the decades many of Aberdeen's successful youth products (not least Willie Miller, McLeish, Black, Leighton, McMaster and later Joe Miller, Phil McGuire, Diamond and Chris Maguire) have moved from the west of Scotland to begin their professional careers. In the 21st century Aberdeen have also looked further afield to the English lower leagues for academy recruits as well as senior players.

In 2017, the Aberdeen academy was one of eight across the country designated 'elite' status on the introduction of Project Brave, an SFA initiative to concentrate the development of the best young players at a smaller number of clubs with high quality facilities and coaching than was previously the case.

== Squad ==
As of 10 July 2026

=== Reserves/Youths ===
Note: Flags indicate national team as defined under FIFA eligibility rules; some limited exceptions apply. Players may hold more than one non-FIFA nationality.

No.	Pos.	Nation	Player
35	MF	SCO	Alfie Stewart
42	DF	SCO	Jamie Mercer
43	DF	SCO	Lewis Carrol
44	MF	SCO	Aaron Cummings
47	MF	SCO	Sam McLean
48	MF	SCO	Cooper Masson
53	FW	SCO	Andrew Fasnaya
54	FW	SCO	Jack Searle
56	DF	SCO	Joel Okhuoya
—	GK	SCO	Theo Simpson

No.	Pos.	Nation	Player
—	GK	SCO	Conlan Waldron
—	DF	SCO	Jay Henderson
—	DF	SCO	James Jarvie
—	DF	SCO	Max Pocklington
—	DF	SCO	Dylan Ross
—	MF	SCO	Heath Duncan
—	FW	SCO	Bradley Chikomo
—	FW	SCO	JJ Hulse
—	FW	SCO	Joseph Teasdale
—	FW	SCO	Zak To

== Honours ==
Reserves

- Highland League
  - Winners: 1912–13, 1924–25
  - Runners-up: 1913–14
- SFL Division C (North-East)
  - Winners: 1952–53, 1954–55
  - Runners-up: 1950–51, 1953–54
- Scottish Reserve League (Note: Includes the Scottish Reserve League 1945–1949, the Scottish (Reserve) League 1955–1975, the Scottish Reserve League 1975–1998 and the Scottish Premier Reserve League 2004–2009. Any wins in the Scottish Football Alliance (1918–1939) or the SFL Division C (1949–1955) are listed separately. Any wins in the SPL Under-21 league (1998–2004) are listed in the Youth section.)
  - Winners (4): 1955–56, 1972–73, 1981–82, 1986–87
- Scottish Football Alliance
  - Winners: 1932–33, 1935–36
- Scottish Reserve League Cup
  - Winners (9): 1950–51, 1951–52, 1956–57, 1957–58, 1972–73, 1973–74, 1978–79, 1984–85, 1996–97
- Scottish 2nd XI Cup
  - Winners (6): 1954–55, 1955–56, 1968–69, 1975–76, 1977–78, 1981–82

Youth

- Scottish Youth Cup
  - Winners (3): 1985, 1986, 2001
  - Runners-up: 2003, 2018
- SPFL Development League (Note: Since 1998; previously known as the Scottish Premier Under-18/Under-19/Under-20 League and SPFL Under-20 League.)
  - Winners: 1998–99, 2014–15
  - Runners-up: 1994–95, 2012–13
- SFL Youth League (Note: 1993–2003. Became competition for lower division clubs after introduction of Scottish Premier League in 1998.)
  - Winners: 1993–94, 1997–98

== Former reserve/youth team players ==
This list focuses on the players who have graduated through Aberdeen's academy since the inception of the SPL in 1998 (many other of Aberdeen's earlier notable players, including most of the highly successful Alex Ferguson era, also came through the youth system).
Players currently at Aberdeen in bold

- Russell Anderson
- Ryan Esson
- Fergus Tiernan
- Michael Hart
- Darren Mackie
- Russell Duncan
- Phil McGuire
- Chris Clark
- Kevin McNaughton
- Kevin Rutkiewicz
- Ricky Foster
- Scott Morrison
- Zander Diamond
- Andrew Considine
- Chris Maguire
- Michael Paton
- Nicky Clark
- Peter Pawlett
- Ryan Jack
- Nicky Low
- Stephen O'Donnell
- Mitchel Megginson
- Fraser Fyvie
- Jack Grimmer
- Scott Bain
- Ryan Fraser
- Joe Shaughnessy
- Clark Robertson
- Declan McManus
- Lawrence Shankland
- Cammy Smith
- Scott Wright
- Scott McKenna
- Frank Ross
- Dean Campbell
- Bruce Anderson
- Connor McLennan
- **Jack MacKenzie**
- Calvin Ramsay
- Connor Barron
