= 2020–21 South Challenge Cup =

The SoccerShop Challenge Cup

Tournament details
- Country: Scotland; England (2 teams)
- Dates: 24 October 2020 – 26 April 2021 (tournament abandoned)
- Teams: 121 (142 initially entered)

Tournament statistics
- Matches played: 52
- Goals scored: 251 (4.83 per match)
- Attendance: 0 (0 per match)

The 2020–21 SFA South Region Challenge Cup (known as The SoccerShop Challenge Cup for sponsorship reasons) was the 14th edition of the annual knockout cup competition for senior non-league clubs in the central and southern regions of Scotland. This season sees the tournament increase from 70 to 121 teams thanks to additional clubs joining the East of Scotland Football League and the inclusion of 67 clubs from the inaugural West of Scotland Football League.

Arniston Rangers and Cumbernauld Colts are not competing due to a breach of rules in the previous season's competition. A number of clubs withdrew before the start of the tournament, including those who declined to take part in the WoSFL.

Due to Scottish Government restrictions, games were played behind closed doors because of the COVID-19 pandemic.

On 11 January 2021 the competition was suspended by the Scottish Football Association due to the escalating pandemic situation. With the season already complete for each of the four leagues competing in the tournament, the competition was declared null and void on 26 April 2021.

== Format ==
The South Challenge Cup initially featured 142 senior non-league clubs from the Lowland Football League (16), East of Scotland Football League (47), South of Scotland Football League (12), and West of Scotland Football League (67). The reserve teams of Stirling University, Caledonian Braves, and Stranraer do not take part.

The draw is unseeded, with matches proceeding to extra time and penalties if they are tied after 90 minutes.

== Calendar ==
Round	Main date	Fixtures	Clubs
First round	24 October 2020	14	142 → 128
Second round	21 November 2020	64	128 → 64
Third round	6 February 2021	32	64 → 32
Fourth round	6 March 2021	16	32 → 16
Fifth round	3 April 2021	8	16 → 8
Quarter-Finals	24 April 2021	4	8 → 4
Semi-Finals	15 May 2021	2	4 → 2
Final	6 June 2021	1	2 → 1

== First round ==
The draw for the first and second rounds took place on Saturday 5 September 2020 and was broadcast live on the Official Catchup YouTube channel. The majority of the first round fixtures took place on the weekend of Saturday 24 October 2020.

23 October 2020	The Spartans	4–0	Kinnoull	Edinburgh
19:45				Stadium: Ainslie Park; Attendance: 0

24 October 2020	Bonnyrigg Rose Athletic	2–0	Newtongrange Star	Bonnyrigg
15:00				Stadium: New Dundas Park; Attendance: 0

24 October 2020	Broxburn Athletic	6–0	Creetown	Broxburn
14:30				Stadium: Albyn Park; Attendance: 0

Carluke Rovers	w/o (Awarded)	Kilbirnie Ladeside

Dunbar United	w/o (Awarded)	Drumchapel United

24 October 2020	Easthouses Lily MW	5–3	Larkhall Thistle	Easthouses
14:30				Stadium: Newbattle Complex; Attendance: 0

24 October 2020	Irvine Victoria	3–3 (a.e.t.) (3–5 p)	St Anthony's	Irvine
14:00				Stadium: Victoria Park; Attendance: 0

24 October 2020	Jeanfield Swifts	5–0	Lochgelly Albert	Perth
14:30				Stadium: Riverside Stadium; Attendance: 0

24 October 2020	Maybole Juniors	2–3	Vale of Leven	Maybole
14:00				Stadium: Ladywell Stadium; Attendance: 0

Pollok	w/o (Awarded)	Tranent Juniors

24 October 2020	Threave Rovers	7–2	Ormiston	Castle Douglas
15:00				Stadium: Meadow Park; Attendance: 0

24 October 2020	Vale of Clyde	4–1 (a.e.t.)	East Kilbride Thistle	Glasgow
14:00				Stadium: Fullarton Park; Attendance: 0

4 November 2020	Sauchie Juniors	2–1	Kilwinning Rangers	Sauchie
19:30				Stadium: Beechwood Park; Attendance: 0

21 November 2020	Thornton Hibs	1–0	Rutherglen Glencairn	Methil
15:00				Stadium: Bayview Stadium; Attendance: 0

1. A: Dunbar United, Kilbirnie Ladeside, and Pollok withdrew from the competition.

== Second round ==
The majority of the second round fixtures took place on the weekend of 21 November 2020. A number of teams received a bye to the third round after 18 teams from the West of Scotland League withdrew from the competition.

20 November 2020	East Stirlingshire	3–4 (a.e.t.)	The Spartans	Falkirk
19:45				Stadium: Falkirk Stadium; Attendance: 0

21 November 2020	Annbank United	2–3	Vale of Leven	Ayr
13:30				Stadium: Dam Park Stadium

21 November 2020	Ardeer Thistle	0–12	Tranent Juniors	Stevenston
13:30				Stadium: Ardeer Stadium

Ardrossan Winton Rovers	w/o (Awarded)	University of Stirling

21 November 2020	Bellshill Athletic	2–3	Cumbernauld United	Bellshill
13:30				Stadium: Rockburn Park

21 November 2020	Blackburn United	3–1	Newburgh	Blackburn
14:30				Stadium: New Murrayfield Park

21 November 2020	Bo'ness United	4–1	Burntisland Shipyard	Bo'ness
15:00				Stadium: Newtown Park

21 November 2020	Broxburn Athletic	0–3	Irvine Meadow XI	Broxburn
14:30				Stadium: Albyn Park

21 November 2020	Cambuslang Rangers	C–C	Girvan

21 November 2020	Coldstream	2–0	Crossgates Primrose	Coldstream
14:30				Stadium: Home Park

21 November 2020	Craigmark Burntonians	2–2 (a.e.t.) (4–3 p)	Bonnyton Thistle	Cumnock
13:30				Stadium: Townhead Park

Cumnock Juniors	w/o (Awarded)	Wishaw

21 November 2020	Dalkeith Thistle	0–6	BSC Glasgow	Dalkeith
14:30				Stadium: King's Park

21 November 2020	Darvel	3–2	Easthouses Lily MW	Darvel
13:30				Stadium: Recreation Park

21 November 2020	Dunipace	5–3	Mid-Annandale	Denny
14:30				Stadium: Westfield Park

Edinburgh United	w/o (Awarded)	Arthurlie

21 November 2020	Eyemouth United	1–3	Muirkirk Juniors	Eyemouth
13:30				Stadium: Warner Park

21 November 2020	Forth Wanderers	4–2	Threave Rovers	Carluke
13:30				Stadium: John Cumming Stadium

21 November 2020	Gala Fairydean Rovers	2–1	Sauchie Juniors	Galashiels
15:00				Stadium: Netherdale

21 November 2020	Gartcairn	6–3	Inverkeithing Hilfield Swifts	Airdrie
14:00				Stadium: MTC Park

Glasgow Perthshire	w/o (Awarded)	Petershill

21 November 2020	Glasgow University	0–1	Hill of Beath Hawthorn	Airdrie
14:00				Stadium: Excelsior Stadium

Glenafton Athletic	w/o (Awarded)	Neilston

21 November 2020	Glenrothes	1–5	St Cadoc's	Kirkcaldy
15:00				Stadium: Stark's Park

21 November 2020	Greenock Juniors	3–0	Vale of Clyde	Greenock
14:00				Stadium: Ravenscraig Stadium

21 November 2020	Haddington Athletic	3–1	Abbey Vale	Haddington
14:30				Stadium: Millfield Park

21 November 2020	Heriot-Watt University	3–2	Drumchapel United	Edinburgh
15:00				Stadium: Riccarton Campus

21 November 2020	Hurlford United	4–1	Civil Service Strollers	Hurlford
13:30				Stadium: Blair Park

21 November 2020	Jeanfield Swifts	3–1	Caledonian Braves	Perth
13:30				Stadium: Riverside Stadium

21 November 2020	Johnstone Burgh	2–1	Maryhill	Glasgow
13:30				Stadium: New Tinto Park

21 November 2020	Kennoway Star Hearts	0–3	St. Roch's	Star
13:30				Stadium: Treaton Park

Kelty Hearts	w/o (Awarded)	Auchinleck Talbot

21 November 2020	Kilsyth Rangers	2–2 (a.e.t.) (4–5 p)	Rossvale	Kilsyth
13:30				Stadium: Duncansfield Park

Lanark United	w/o (Awarded)	Ashfield

21 November 2020	Largs Thistle	2–1	Dalbeattie Star	Largs
13:30				Stadium: Barrfields Park

21 November 2020	Leith Athletic	3–0	Tweedmouth Rangers	Edinburgh
15:00				Stadium: Peffermill 3G

Lesmahagow Juniors	w/o (Awarded)	Port Glasgow

21 November 2020	Linlithgow Rose	2–1	Kello Rovers	Linlithgow
14:30				Stadium: Prestonfield

21 November 2020	Lochmaben	3–6	Kirkcaldy & Dysart	Lochmaben
13:30				Stadium: Whitehills Park

Lothian Thistle Hutchison Vale	w/o (Awarded)	Dalry Thistle

Luncarty	w/o (Awarded)	Whitletts Victoria

Lugar Boswell Thistle	w/o (Awarded)	Lochar Thistle

Musselburgh Athletic	w/o (Awarded)	Benburb

21 November 2020	Newton Stewart	1–3	Yoker Athletic	Newton Stewart
15:00				Stadium: Blairmount Park

21 November 2020	Renfrew	3–0	Bonnyrigg Rose Athletic	Renfrew
14:00				Stadium: New Western Park

21 November 2020	Rosyth	3–5	Camelon Juniors	Rosyth
14:30				Stadium: Fleet Grounds

Royal Albert	w/o (Awarded)	Wigtown & Bladnoch

Saltcoats Victoria	w/o (Awarded)	Lochore Welfare

21 November 2020	Shettleston	C–C	Shotts Bon Accord

21 November 2020	St Andrews United	2–3	Hawick Royal Albert United	St Andrews
13:30				Stadium: Recreation Ground

21 November 2020	St Anthony's	1–3	East Kilbride	Glasgow
13:30				Stadium: McKenna Park

21 November 2020	St Cuthbert Wanderers	0–3	Tynecastle	Kirkcudbright
15:00				Stadium: St Mary's Park

21 November 2020	Troon	3–4 (a.e.t.)	Preston Athletic	Troon
13:30				Stadium: Portland Park

21 November 2020	Upper Annandale	1–4	Berwick Rangers	Lockerbie
15:00				Stadium: New King Edward Park

21 November 2020	Vale of Leithen	5–1 (Abandoned)	Heston Rovers	Innerleithen
13:30				Stadium: Victoria Park

21 November 2020	Whitehill Welfare	2–0	Carluke Rovers	Rosewell
14:30				Stadium: Ferguson Park

22 November 2020	Edinburgh South	4–5 (a.e.t.)	Blantyre Victoria	Dalkeith
14:30				Stadium: King's Park

28 November 2020	Beith Juniors	0–3 (a.e.t.)	Clydebank	Beith
13:30				Stadium: Bellsdale Park

Thornton Hibs	w/o (Awarded)	Nithsdale Wanderers

TBC	Thorniewood United	v	Craigroyston	Viewpark
13:30				Stadium: Robertson Park

30 January 2021	Dundonald Bluebell	v	Kirkintilloch Rob Roy	Cardenden
13:30				Stadium: Moorside Park

30 January 2021	Newmains United	v	Edinburgh University	Newmains
13:30				Stadium: Victoria Park

30 January 2021	Peebles Rovers	v	Oakley United	Peebles
13:30				Stadium: Whitestone Park

6 February 2021	Gretna 2008	v	Penicuik Athletic	Gretna
15:00				Stadium: Raydale Park

Replay

6 February 2021	Vale of Leithen	v	Heston Rovers	Innerleithen
15:00				Stadium: Victoria Park

1. B: Ardrossan Winton Rovers, Arthurlie, Auchinleck Talbot, Benburb, Cambuslang Rangers, Cumnock Juniors, Dalry Thistle, Girvan, Glenafton Athletic, Lanark United, Lesmahagow Juniors, Lugar Boswell Thistle, Nithsdale Wanderers, Petershill, Royal Albert, Saltcoats Victoria, Shettleston, Shotts Bon Accord, and Whitletts Victoria withdrew from the competition.

== Third round ==
The third round was due to take place on the weekend of Saturday 6 February 2021. The draw for the third round took place on Friday 12 December 2020 and was broadcast live on the Official Catchup YouTube channel.

Due to teams withdrawing in the previous rounds, Gartcairn and Port Glasgow received a bye to the fourth round.

Ashfield	v	University of Stirling	Glasgow
			Stadium: Saracen Park

Berwick Rangers	v	Camelon Juniors	Berwick-upon-Tweed
			Stadium: Shielfield Park

Blackburn United	v	Thorniewood United or Craigroyston	Blackburn
			Stadium: New Murrayfield Park

Bo'ness United	v	Hill of Beath Hawthorn	Bo'ness
			Stadium: Newtown Park

Coldstream	v	Hawick Royal Albert United	Coldstream
			Stadium: Home Park

Gala Fairydean Rovers	v	The Spartans	Galashiels
			Stadium: Netherdale

Glasgow Perthshire	v	Heriot-Watt University	Glasgow
			Stadium: Keppoch Park

Haddington Athletic	v	Renfrew	Haddington
			Stadium: Millfield Park

Irvine Meadow XI	v	Peebles Rovers or Oakley United	Irvine
			Stadium: Meadow Park

Johnstone Burgh	v	Blantyre Victoria	Johnstone
			Stadium: James Y. Keanie Park

Kirkcaldy & Dysart	v	Preston Athletic	Kirkcaldy
			Stadium: Alex Penman Park

Largs Thistle	v	Jeanfield Swifts	Largs
			Stadium: Barrfields Park

Leith Athletic	v	Kelty Hearts	Edinburgh
			Stadium: Peffermill 3G

Linlithgow Rose	v	Lochore Welfare	Linlithgow
			Stadium: Prestonfield

Lochar Thistle	v	Musselburgh Athletic	Dumfries
			Stadium: Maxwelltown High School

Lothian Thistle Hutchison Vale	v	Edinburgh United	Edinburgh
			Stadium: Saughton Enclosure

Muirkirk Juniors	v	Craigmark Burntonians	Muirkirk
			Stadium: Burnside Park

Neilston	v	Darvel	Neilston
			Stadium: Brig O' Lea Stadium

Newmains United or Edinburgh University	v	Thornton Hibs

Rossvale	v	Hurlford United	Glasgow
			Stadium: New Tinto Park

St Cadoc's	v	Cumbernauld United	Glasgow
			Stadium: McKenna Park

St. Roch's	v	Greenock Juniors	Glasgow
			Stadium: James McGrory Park

Tynecastle	v	East Kilbride	Edinburgh
			Stadium: Meggetland Sports Complex

Vale of Leven	v	BSC Glasgow	Alexandria
			Stadium: Millburn Park

Whitehill Welfare	v	Dundonald Bluebell or Kirkintilloch Rob Roy	Rosewell
			Stadium: Ferguson Park

Wishaw	v	Wigtown & Bladnoch	Wishaw
			Stadium: Beltane Park

Yoker Athletic	v	Dunipace	Clydebank
			Stadium: Holm Park

Clydebank	v	Forth Wanderers	Clydebank
			Stadium: Holm Park

Gretna 2008 or Penicuik Athletic	v	Tranent Juniors

Luncarty	v	Vale of Leithen or Heston Rovers	Luncarty
			Stadium: Brownlands Park
