= 2018–19 South Challenge Cup =

SFA South Region Challenge Cup

Tournament details
- Country: Scotland; England (1 team)
- Teams: 69

Final positions
- Champions: East Kilbride
- Runners-up: Bonnyrigg Rose Athletic

Tournament statistics
- Matches played: 66
- Goals scored: 293 (4.44 per match)
- All statistics correct as of 26 May 2019.

The 2018–19 SFA South Region Challenge Cup was the 12th edition of the annual cup competition for senior non-league clubs in the central and southern regions of Scotland. This season saw the competition increase to 69 teams from the 42 who took part in 2017–18, thanks to the addition of 26 clubs to the East of Scotland Football League and the return of Wigtown and Bladnoch.

The defending champions were Civil Service Strollers, who beat BSC Glasgow 2-1 after extra time in the final on 20 May 2018. However they were eliminated in the fourth round by Newtongrange Star.

East Kilbride won 2-1 against Bonnyrigg Rose Athletic in the final to secure the South Challenge Cup for a second time, completing a double with the Lowland League title.

== Format ==
The competition featured 69 teams from the Lowland Football League (16), East of Scotland Football League (38), South of Scotland Football League (14), as well as SFA member club Glasgow University of the Caledonian Amateur Football League. The reserve teams of Stirling University, Annan Athletic, and Stranraer do not take part.

The draw is unseeded, with matches proceeding to extra time and penalties if they are tied after 90 minutes.

== Calendar ==
Round	Main date	Fixtures	Clubs
First Round	25 August 2018	5	69 → 64
Second Round	15 September 2018	32	64 → 32
Third Round	13 October 2018	16	32 → 16
Fourth Round	10 November 2018	8	16 → 8
Quarter-finals	2 March 2019	4	8 → 4
Semi-Finals	6 April 2019	2	4 → 2
Final	26 May 2019	1	2 → 1

== First round ==
The first round took place on Saturday 25 August 2018. The draw for the first and second rounds took place at the East of Scotland Football Association's AGM on Thursday 7 June 2018. 59 clubs received a bye to the second round, with 10 taking part in the first round.

25 August 2018	Creetown	5–3	Lochar Thistle	Creetown
15:00				Stadium: Castlecary Park

25 August 2018	Civil Service Strollers	9–0	Wigtown and Bladnoch	Edinburgh
15:00				Stadium: Christie Gillies Park

25 August 2018	Selkirk	w/o (Awarded)	Upper Annandale	Selkirk
15:00				Stadium: Yarrow Park

25 August 2018	St Andrews United	1–4	Lothian Thistle Hutchison Vale	St Andrews
14:30				Stadium: Recreation Park

25 August 2018	St. Cuthbert Wanderers	0–3	Musselburgh Athletic	Kirkcudbright
15:00				Stadium: St Mary's Park

Notes

1. A-Selkirk withdrew from the competition, and later the Lowland League.

== Second round ==
The second round took place on the weekend of Saturday 15 September 2018. The four winners from the first round, along with Upper Annandale who progressed after Selkirk withdrew, joined the 59 clubs who received a bye.

14 September 2018	Cumbernauld Colts	4–0	Arniston Rangers	Cumbernauld
19:45				Stadium: Broadwood Stadium

15 September 2018	Abbey Vale	0–5	Broxburn Athletic	New Abbey
15:00				Stadium: Maryfield Park

15 September 2018	Blackburn United	1–5	Bonnyrigg Rose Athletic	Blackburn
14:30				Stadium: New Murrayfield Park

15 September 2018	Bonnyton Thistle	2–3	Preston Athletic	Kilmarnock
15:00				Stadium: Bonnyton Park

15 September 2018	BSC Glasgow	5–2	Edusport Academy	Alloa
15:00				Stadium: Recreation Park

15 September 2018	Camelon Juniors	4–0	Heston Rovers	Camelon
14:30				Stadium: Carmuirs Park

15 September 2018	Civil Service Strollers	5–0	Upper Annandale	Edinburgh
15:00				Stadium: Christie Gillies Park

15 September 2018	Coldstream	5–0	Newton Stewart	Coldstream
14:30				Stadium: Home Park

15 September 2018	Crossgates Primrose	0–2	Hill of Beath Hawthorn	Crossgates
14:30				Stadium: Humbug Park

15 September 2018	Dalbeattie Star	1–2 (a.e.t.)	Sauchie Juniors	Dalbeattie
15:00				Stadium: Islecroft Stadium

15 September 2018	Dalkeith Thistle	1–2	Stirling University	Dalkeith
14:30				Stadium: King's Park

15 September 2018	Dumfries YMCA	0–10	Tynecastle	Dumfries
15:00				Stadium: Kingholm Park

15 September 2018	Dunbar United	0–1	Newtongrange Star	Dunbar
14:30				Stadium: New Countess Park

15 September 2018	East Kilbride	2–0	Bo'ness United	East Kilbride
15:00				Stadium: K Park

15 September 2018	East Stirlingshire	1–0	Glasgow University	Falkirk
15:00				Stadium: Falkirk Stadium

15 September 2018	Edinburgh United	5–1	Mid-Annandale	Edinburgh
14:30				Stadium: Paties Road Stadium

15 September 2018	Edinburgh University	2–0	Oakley United	Edinburgh
15:00				Stadium: New Peffermill Stadium

15 September 2018	Eyemouth United	w/o (Awarded)	Dundonald Bluebell	Eyemouth
14:30				Stadium: Warner Park

15 September 2018	Gala Fairydean Rovers	0–1	Musselburgh Athletic	Galashiels
15:00				Stadium: 3G Arena, Netherdale

15 September 2018	Hawick Royal Albert	0–3	Burntisland Shipyard	Hawick
14:30				Attendance: Albert Park, Hawick

15 September 2018	Inverkeithing Hillfield Swifts	4–1	Craigroyston	Inverkeithing
14:30				Stadium: Ballast Park

15 September 2018	Linlithgow Rose	5–1	Heriot-Watt University	Linlithgow
14:30				Stadium: Prestonfield

15 September 2018	Lochmaben	0–5	Kelty Hearts	Lockerbie
15:00				Stadium: New King Edward Park

15 September 2018	Nithsdale Wanderers	2–11	Penicuik Athletic	Sanquhar
15:00				Stadium: Lorimer Park

15 September 2018	Ormiston	3–2	Easthouses Lily MW	Ormiston
14:30				Stadium: Recreation Park

15 September 2018	Peebles Rovers	2–1	Dunipace	Peebles
14:30				Stadium: Whitestone Park

15 September 2018	Lothian Thistle Hutchison Vale	3–2	Spartans	Edinburgh
14:30				Stadium: Saughton Enclosure

15 September 2018	Threave Rovers	7–1	Creetown	Castle Douglas
15:00				Stadium: Meadow Park

15 September 2018	Tranent Juniors	4–2	Haddington Athletic	Tranent
14:30				Stadium: Foresters Park

15 September 2018	Vale of Leithen	2–4	Jeanfield Swifts	Innerleithen
15:00				Stadium: Victoria Park

15 September 2018	Whitehill Welfare	0–1	Gretna 2008	Rosewell
15:00				Stadium: Ferguson Park

16 September 2018	Tweedmouth Rangers	0–2	Leith Athletic	Berwick-upon-Tweed
14:30				Stadium: Shielfield

Notes

1. B-The Eyemouth United-Dundonald Bluebell match ended 0–5, however it later emerged that Dundonald had fielded a suspended player so Eyemouth progressed to the third round instead.

== Third round ==
The third round took place on Saturday 13 October 2018, although five matches were postponed until the fourth round date. The draw was made at Hampden Park on Friday 21 September 2018.

13 October 2018	BSC Glasgow	7–1	Threave Rovers	Alloa
15:00				Stadium: Recreation Park

13 October 2018	Bonnyrigg Rose Athletic	10–0	Eyemouth United	Bonnyirgg
14:30				Stadium: New Dundas Park

13 October 2018	Burntisland Shipyard	2–5	Coldstream	Burntisland
14:30				Stadium: Recreation Park

13 October 2018	East Stirlingshire	3–2	Kelty Hearts	Falkirk
15:00				Stadium: Falkirk Stadium

13 October 2018	Edinburgh University	1–0	Edinburgh United	Edinburgh
15:00				Stadium: New Peffermill Stadium

13 October 2018	Inverkeithing Hillfield Swifts	2–4	Preston Athletic	Inverkeithing
14:30				Stadium: Ballast Park

13 October 2018	Jeanfield Swifts	4–2 (a.e.t.)	Broxburn Athletic	Perth
14:30				Stadium: Riverside Stadium

13 October 2018	Leith Athletic	0–2	East Kilbride	Edinburgh
14:30				Stadium: Peffermill 3G

13 October 2018	Sauchie Juniors	3–1	Ormiston	Sauchie
14:30				Stadium: Beechwood Park

13 October 2018	Stirling University	3–1	Tynecastle	Stirling
15:00				Stadium: Forthbank Stadium

13 October 2018	Tranent Juniors	2–6	Linlithgow Rose	Tranent
14:30				Stadium: Foresters Park

10 November 2018	Gretna 2008	0–3	Camelon Juniors	Gretna
15:00				Stadium: Raydale Park

10 November 2018	Hill of Beath Hawthorn	3–1	Musselburgh Athletic	Hill of Beath
14:30				Stadium: Keir's Park

10 November 2018	Lothian Thistle Hutchison Vale	2–1 (a.e.t.)	Cumbernauld Colts	Edinburgh
14:30				Stadium: Saughton Enclosure

10 November 2018	Newtongrange Star	4–2 (a.e.t.)	Civil Service Strollers	Newtongrange
14:30				Stadium: New Victoria Park

10 November 2018	Peebles Rovers	0–5	Penicuik Athletic	Peebles
13:30				Stadium: Whitestone Park

== Fourth round ==
The fourth round took place on Saturday 10 November 2018, although due to postponements three ties were held at a later date.

=== Draw ===
The draw was made at Hampden Park on 17 October 2018 by John Gold of the Scottish Schools Football Association and Fiona McIntyre of the Scottish Women's Football Association.

Teams in Italics were not known at the time of the draw. Teams in Bold advanced to the quarter-finals.

Lowland Football League	East of Scotland Football League
BSC Glasgow; **East Kilbride**; **East Stirlingshire**; Edinburgh University; **Stirling University**	**Bonnyrigg Rose Athletic**; Camelon Juniors; **Coldstream**; **Hill of Beath Hawthorn**; Jeanfield Swifts; Linlithgow Rose; **Lothian Thistle Hutchison Vale**; Newtongrange Star; Penicuik Athletic; Preston Athletic; **Sauchie Juniors**

=== Matches ===
10 November 2018	BSC Glasgow	**1–3**	**Bonnyrigg Rose Athletic**	Alloa
15:00				Stadium: Recreation Park

10 November 2018	**East Stirlingshire**	**5–1**	Linlithgow Rose	Falkirk
15:00				Stadium: Falkirk Stadium

10 November 2018	**East Kilbride**	**5–0**	Preston Athletic	East Kilbride
15:00				Stadium: K-Park Training Academy

10 November 2018	Jeanfield Swifts	**3–4** (a.e.t.)	**Stirling University**	Perth
13:30				Stadium: Riverside Stadium

10 November 2018	**Sauchie Juniors**	**4–0**	Edinburgh University	Sauchie
14:00				Stadium: Beechwood Park

16 January 2019	Newtongrange Star	**0–3**	**Hill of Beath Hawthorn**	Newtongrange
19:30				Stadium: New Victoria Park

26 January 2019	Penicuik Athletic	**4–4** (a.e.t.) (**4–5** p)	**Coldstream**	Penicuik
14:30				Stadium: Penicuik Park

13 February 2019	**Lothian Thistle Hutchison Vale**	**2–2** (a.e.t.) (**3–2** p)	Camelon Juniors	Edinburgh
19:30				Stadium: Saughton Enclosure

== Quarter-finals ==
The quarter-finals took place on Saturday 2 March 2019.

=== Draw ===
The draw was made at Hampden Park on 14 November 2018.

Teams in Italics were not known at the time of the draw. Teams in Bold advanced to the semi-finals.

Lowland Football League	East of Scotland Football League
**East Kilbride**; East Stirlingshire; **Stirling University**	**Bonnyrigg Rose Athletic**; Coldstream; **Hill of Beath Hawthorn**; Lothian Thistle Hutchison Vale; Sauchie Juniors

=== Matches ===
2 March 2019	**Bonnyrigg Rose Athletic**	**2–0**	East Stirlingshire	Bonnyrigg
14:30				Stadium: New Dundas Park; Attendance: 461; Referee: Stewart Luke

2 March 2019	Coldstream	**0–7**	**East Kilbride**	Coldstream
14:30				Stadium: Home Park; Attendance: 112; Referee: Ryan Lee

2 March 2019	Sauchie Juniors	**1–1** (a.e.t.) (**2–4** p)	**Hill of Beath Hawthorn**	Sauchie
14:30				Stadium: Beechwood Park; Attendance: 150; Referee: Stephen Brown

2 March 2019	**Stirling University**	**5–3**	Lothian Thistle Hutchison Vale	Stirling
15:00				Stadium: Forthbank Stadium; Attendance: 32; Referee: Kyle Hall

== Semi-finals ==
The semi-finals took place on Saturday 6 April 2019.

=== Draw ===
Teams in Bold advanced to the final.

Lowland Football League	East of Scotland Football League
**East Kilbride**; Stirling University	**Bonnyrigg Rose Athletic**; Hill of Beath Hawthorn

=== Matches ===
6 April 2019	**Bonnyrigg Rose Athletic**	**0–0** (a.e.t.) (**4–2** p)	Stirling University	Bonnyrigg
14:30				Stadium: New Dundas Park; Attendance: 273; Referee: Colin Whyte

6 April 2019	Hill of Beath Hawthorn	**2–3**	**East Kilbride**	Hill of Beath
14:30				Stadium: Keir's Park; Attendance: 287; Referee: Iain Snedden

== Final ==
The final was played on Sunday 26 May 2019 at Meggetland Stadium in Edinburgh, between the champions of the Lowland League and East of Scotland League.

26 May 2019
14:00

East Kilbride	2–1	Bonnyrigg Rose Athletic

Meggetland Stadium, Edinburgh
Attendance: 570
Referee: Craig Napier
