= 2024–25 South of Scotland Football League =

South of Scotland Football League
- Season: 2024–25
- Dates: 27 July 2024 – 3 May 2025
- Champions: Lochar Thistle
- Matches: 132
- Goals: 656 (4.97 per match)
- Biggest home win: Dalbeattie Star 8–0 St Cuthbert Wanderers (21 September 2024); Stranraer reserves 8–0 Lochmaben (11 January 2025); Lochar Thistle 8–0 St Cuthbert Wanderers (15 March 2025)
- Biggest away win: Wigtown & Bladnoch 1–14 Dalbeattie Star (10 August 2024)
- Highest scoring: Wigtown & Bladnoch 1–14 Dalbeattie Star (10 August 2024)
- Longest winning run: 10 matches: Newton Stewart
- Longest unbeaten run: 15 matches: Creetown
- Longest winless run: 22 matches: Wigtown & Bladnoch
- Longest losing run: 13 matches: Wigtown & Bladnoch
- All statistics correct as of 3 May 2025.

The 2024–25 South of Scotland Football League was the 79th season of the South of Scotland Football League, and the 11th season as part of the sixth tier of the Scottish football pyramid system. Dalbeattie Star were the reigning champions, but were unable to defend their title, as they can only finish third at best.

Lochar Thistle won the South of Scotland Football League for the first time, overhauling title rivals Newton Stewart, Dalbeattie Star and Creetown having caught up their points deficit with their games in hand. They clinched the championship with a 3–0 victory over Creetown on 26 April 2025, but were ineligible for promotion, as they do not hold an SFA club licence.

== Teams ==
Location of teams in 2024–25 South of Scotland Football League

=== Stadia and locations ===
Team	Location	Home ground	Surface	Capacity	Seats	Floodlit
Abbey Vale	New Abbey	Maryfield Park	Grass	800	48	No
Creetown^{[SFA]}	Creetown	Castle Cary Park	Grass	500	0	Yes
Dalbeattie Star^{[SFA]}	Dalbeattie	Islecroft Stadium	Grass	1,320	100	Yes
Lochar Thistle	Dumfries	Wilson Park	Grass	600	0	Yes
Lochmaben	Lochmaben	Whitehills Park	Grass	1,000	0	No
Mid-Annandale	Lockerbie	New King Edward Park	Artificial	500	0	Yes
Newton Stewart^{[SFA]}	Newton Stewart	Blairmount Park	Artificial	1,000	0	Yes
Nithsdale Wanderers	Sanquhar	Lorimer Park	Grass	1,000	0	Yes
St Cuthbert Wanderers^{[SFA]}	Kirkcudbright	St Mary's Park	Artificial	1,000	0	Yes
Stranraer reserves	Stranraer	Stranraer Academy	Artificial	1,000	0	Yes
Upper Annandale	Moffat	Moffat Academy	Grass	1,000	0	No
Wigtown & Bladnoch^{[SFA]}	Wigtown	Trammondford Park	Grass	888	0	Yes

^{SFA} Club with an SFA licence eligible to participate in the Lowland League promotion play-off should they win the league, and also compete in the Scottish Cup.

Stranraer reserves are ineligible for promotion.

== League table ==
Pos	Team	Pld	W	D	L	GF	GA	GD	Pts	Qualification
1	Lochar Thistle (C)	22	17	1	4	81	21	+60	52	Ineligible for the Lowland League play-off
2	Newton Stewart	22	15	5	2	77	26	+51	50	
3	Dalbeattie Star	22	14	4	4	90	42	+48	46	
4	Creetown	22	14	3	5	64	34	+30	45	
5	Stranraer reserves	22	13	4	5	57	36	+21	43	Ineligible for promotion
6	Abbey Vale	22	12	2	8	56	45	+11	38	
7	Nithsdale Wanderers	22	11	4	7	71	55	+16	37	
8	Upper Annandale	22	8	3	11	43	43	0	27	
9	Mid-Annandale	22	5	2	15	43	69	−26	17	
10	Lochmaben	22	3	3	16	32	74	−42	12	
11	St Cuthbert Wanderers	22	2	4	16	24	96	−72	10	
12	Wigtown & Bladnoch	22	0	1	21	18	115	−97	1	

Source: South of Scotland Football League
Rules for classification: 1) Points; 2) Goal difference; 3) Number of goals scored
(C) Champions

== Results ==
Home \ Away	ABB	CRE	DAL	LOT	LOC	MID	NEW	NIT	SCW	STR	UPA	WIG
Abbey Vale		0–5	3–8	2–0	3–2	0–1	2–5	3–3	4–1	1–3	5–0	4–0
Creetown	2–1		3–7	0–2	3–0	3–2	0–1	7–4	2–2 (Note: Match played at Blairmount Park, Newton Stewart.)	3–0	1–0	2–1
Dalbeattie Star	0–1	2–2 (Note: Match played at North West Community Campus, Dumfries.)		1–1	5–0	4–3	3–3	4–0	8–0	2–4	1–1	5–3
Lochar Thistle	5–1	3–0	2–3		3–1	3–1	1–3	6–2	8–0	2–0	3–0	3–0
Lochmaben	0–5	0–2	2–3	1–4		3–1	1–6	1–4	5–0	1–2	2–2	3–2
Mid-Annandale	0–4	2–6	1–4	0–5	5–1		1–5	0–5	7–0	3–3	0–3	5–1
Newton Stewart	1–2	1–1	3–4	5–1	5–1	5–0		3–3	6–0	3–0	1–0	4–0
Nithsdale Wanderers	3–1	5–2	1–4	0–3	5–4	4–1	3–3		5–1	1–4	1–0	6–0
St Cuthbert Wanderers	1–2	0–7	0–5	0–9	2–2	3–3	0–5	3–3		1–4	0–1	5–0
Stranraer reserves	1–1	0–2	5–1	0–6	8–0	3–1	0–0	4–1	3–2		1–0	3–2
Upper Annandale	1–6 (Note: Match played at New King Edward Park, Lockerbie.)	0–3 (Note: Match played at New King Edward Park, Lockerbie.)	3–2 (Note: Match played at New King Edward Park, Lockerbie.)	1–3 (Note: Match played at New King Edward Park, Lockerbie.)	3–1 (Note: Match played at New King Edward Park, Lockerbie.)	3–1 (Note: Match played at New King Edward Park, Lockerbie.)	2–4 (Note: Match played at New King Edward Park, Lockerbie.)	1–4 (Note: Match played at New King Edward Park, Lockerbie.)	7–0 (Note: Match played at New King Edward Park, Lockerbie.)	3–3 (Note: Match played at New King Edward Park, Lockerbie.)		7–0 (Note: Match played at New King Edward Park, Lockerbie.)
Wigtown & Bladnoch	3–5	1–8	1–14	0–8 (Note: Match played at Blairmount Park, Newton Stewart.)	1–1	1–5	1–5	0–8	0–3	0–6	1–5	

Source: South of Scotland Football League
Legend: Blue = home team win; Yellow = draw; Red = away team win.
