= 2011–12 Scottish Cup =

2011-12 William Hill Scottish Cup

Tournament details
- Country: Scotland
- Teams: 81

Final positions
- Champions: Heart of Midlothian
- Runners-up: Hibernian

Tournament statistics
- Top goal scorer: Rudi Skacel (5)

The 2011–12 Scottish Cup was the 127th season of Scotland's most prestigious football knockout competition. The tournament began on 24 September 2011 and ended on 19 May 2012. It was sponsored by William Hill in the first season of a three-year partnership, known as the William Hill Scottish Cup. The winner of the competition qualified for the play-off round of the 2012–13 UEFA Europa League. Heart of Midlothian won 5–1 against city rivals Hibernian at Hampden Park.

== Calendar ==
Round	Draw date	First match date	Fixtures		Clubs
Round	Draw date	First match date	Original	Replays	Clubs
First round	Monday 29 August 2011	Saturday 24 September 2011	17	1	81 → 64
Second round	Wednesday 28 September 2011	Saturday 22 October 2011	16	4	64 → 48
Third round	Wednesday 26 October 2011	Saturday 19 November 2011	16	4	48 → 32
Fourth round	Tuesday 22 November 2011	Saturday 7 January 2012	16	3	32 → 16
Fifth round	Monday 9 January 2012	Saturday 4 February 2012	8	3	16 → 8
Quarter-finals	Monday 6 February 2012	Saturday 10 March 2012	4	1	8 → 4
Semi-finals	Sunday 11 March 2012	Saturday 14 & Sunday 15 April 2012	2	N/A	4 → 2
Final	N/A	Saturday 19 May 2012	1	N/A	2 → 1

== Fixtures & Results ==
=== First round ===
The first round draw was conducted on 29 August 2011 at Buchanan Galleries in Glasgow.

This round is populated entirely by non-league clubs:

- 13 clubs from the Highland Football League holding membership of the SFA (Brora Rangers, Clachnacuddin, Cove Rangers, Forres Mechanics, Fort William, Fraserburgh, Huntly, Inverurie Loco Works, Keith, Lossiemouth, Nairn County, Rothes, Wick Academy)
- 10 clubs from the East of Scotland League holding membership of the SFA (Civil Service Strollers, Coldstream, Edinburgh City, Edinburgh University, Gala Fairydean, Hawick Royal Albert, Preston Athletic, Selkirk, Vale of Leithen, Whitehill Welfare)
- 4 clubs from the South of Scotland League holding membership of the SFA (Dalbeattie Star, Newton Stewart, St Cuthbert Wanderers, Wigtown & Bladnoch)
- 4 other clubs holding membership of the SFA (Burntisland Shipyard, Girvan, Glasgow University, Golspie Sutherland)
- 4 qualifiers from the Scottish Junior Football Association (Auchinleck Talbot, Bo'ness United, Culter, Irvine Meadow)

Golspie Sutherland received a bye into the Second Round.

24 September 2011	Culter	4–0	Burntisland Shipyard	Crombie Park
15:00	McBain 7', 42', 53'; Smart 80' (o.g.)			Referee: Ross McIntyre

24 September 2011	Dalbeattie Star	1–6	Inverurie Loco Works	Islecroft Stadium
15:00	Dingwall 46'		Young 7', 51'; Ross 25'; Bain 51'; McLean 65', 75'	Referee: Don Robertson

24 September 2011	Edinburgh City	3–0	Brora Rangers	Meadowbank Stadium
15:00	Ross 60', 62'; Gair 80' (pen.)			Referee: Paul Reid

24 September 2011	Edinburgh University	0–3	Whitehill Welfare	Peffermill Playing Fields
15:00			Smail 35', 62'; Young 78' (pen.)	Referee: Graeme Stewart

24 September 2011	Forres Mechanics	2–2	Irvine Meadow XI	Mosset Park
15:00	Moore 68'; Tweedie 85'		McGuiness 5'; Husley 76'	Referee: Andrew Dallas

24 September 2011	Fraserburgh	4–3	Civil Service Strollers	Bellslea Park
15:00	Bruce 11', 17'; Hale 37'; Christie 90'; Tweedie 85'		Gormley 42'; Rennie 45', 61'	Referee: Craig Sim

24 September 2011	Gala Fairydean	8–1	Hawick Royal Albert	Netherdale
15:00	Hay 11', 55', 88' (pen.); Jackson 19'; Grass 47'; Rossi 61'; Barnston 66'; Wilson 68'		Cooper 28'	Referee: Gavin Duncan

24 September 2011	Glasgow University	0–4	Cove Rangers	Garscube Sports Complex
15:00			Park 38', 85'; Milne 61' (pen.), 70'	Referee: James Campbell

24 September 2011	Huntly	6–1	Newton Stewart	Christie Park
15:00	McCarthy 8'; Fyfe 38'; Naismith 43'; Guild 45'; Thoirs 47'; Booth 78'		Sutherland 57'	Referee: Graeme Beaton

24 September 2011	Lossiemouth	1–2	Auchinleck Talbot	Grant Park
15:00	Smith 19'		McCann 55'; Gillies 89'	Referee: Bryan Braidwood

24 September 2011	Nairn County	2–1	Selkirk	Station Park
15:00	Gethins 73'; MacKay 89'		Gibson 70'	Referee: Caryl Potten

24 September 2011	Rothes	0–3	Clachnacuddin	Mackessack Park
15:00			Williamson 30'; MacLeod 37'; Brindle 54'	Referee: Ryan Milne

24 September 2011	St Cuthbert Wanderers	0–2	Keith	St Mary's Park
15:00			Donaldson 17'; Walker 78'	Referee: Kevin Graham

24 September 2011	Vale of Leithen	1–0	Girvan	Victoria Park
15:00	Moffat 30'			Referee: Gavin Ross

24 September 2011	Wick Academy	9–1	Coldstream	Harmsworth Park
15:00	MacAdie 28'; Allan 31'; Weir 52' (pen.), 78', 82'; Shearer 61'; Cunningham 65', 69', 76'		Adamson 37'	Referee: Billy Baxter

24 September 2011	Wigtown & Bladnoch	2–0	Preston Athletic	Trammondford Park
15:00	Miller 15'; McMillan 75'			Referee: Steven Reid

1 October 2011	Fort William	0–4	Bo'ness United	Claggan Park
15:00			Gibb 18', 22'; Walker 31'; Tarditi 67'	Referee: Gary McCarthy

==== First round replay ====
1 October 2011	Irvine Meadow XI	6–3	Forres Mechanics	Meadow Park
15:00	Robertson 6', 50'; Fleming 32'; Barr 46'; McLennan 64'; Hughes 82'		Allan 17', 26' (pen.); Fraser 19'	Referee: Andrew Dallas

=== Second round ===
The second round draw was conducted on 28 September 2011 at the William Hill shop in West Campbell Street in Glasgow.

The 17 winners and 1 bye from the First Round enter here, along with the 10 SFL Third Division clubs (Alloa Athletic, Annan Athletic, Berwick Rangers, Clyde, East Stirlingshire, Elgin City, Montrose, Peterhead, Queen's Park, Stranraer), Highland League champions (Buckie Thistle), Highland League runners-up (Deveronvale), East of Scotland League champions (Spartans) and South of Scotland League champions (Threave Rovers).

At a hearing of the SFA Judicial Panel on 10 November 2011, Spartans were expelled from the competition for fielding an unregistered and therefore ineligible player in their Second Round tie against Culter. Culter were re-instated to the Third round.

22 October 2011	Clachnacuddin	1–1	Inverurie Loco Works	Grant Street Park
15:00	Dougall 42'	Report	Maitland 71'

22 October 2011	Vale of Leithen	3–2	Cove Rangers	Victoria Park
15:00	Moffat 23'; Hall 42'; Ferguson 90'	Report	Singer 44'; Webster 90'

22 October 2011	Gala Fairydean	5–2	Golspie Sutherland	Albert Park
15:00	Hay 21', 39', 80'; Livingstone 47', 56'	Report	Kerr 40' (pen.); Nicholson 79'

22 October 2011	Bo'ness United	2–1	Whitehill Welfare	Newtown Park
14:30	Tarditi 8', 71'	Report	Kidd 77' (pen.)

22 October 2011	Fraserburgh	0–0	Elgin City	Bellslea Park
15:00		Report		Attendance: 520; Referee: Hilland

22 October 2011	Wigtown & Bladnoch	0–9	Stranraer	Trammondford Park
14:00		Report	Winter 11', 60', 77'; Malcolm 13', 45'; Aitken 38'; Grehan 43', 71'; McLom 88'	Attendance: 450; Referee: Graham

22 October 2011	Peterhead	2–0	Nairn County	Balmoor Stadium
15:00	Bavidge 12', 24'	Report		Attendance: 625; Referee: Anderson

22 October 2011	Wick Academy	0–1	Keith	Harmsworth Park
15:00		Report	Keith 33' (pen.)

22 October 2011	Culter	0–2^{†}	Spartans	Crombie Park
15:00		Report	Malin 23' (pen.); Finnie 83'

22 October 2011	Alloa Athletic	2–2	Annan Athletic	Recreation Park
15:00	Cawley 16'; Masterton 68'	Report	Cox 36'; Watson 54'	Attendance: 490; Referee: Brines

22 October 2011	Deveronvale	4–0	Berwick Rangers	Princess Royal Park
15:00	Duncan 19'; Fraser 29'; Blackhall 66'; McKenzie 71' (pen.)	Report	Thomson (red card) 69'	Attendance: 650; Referee: Robertson

22 October 2011	Auchinleck Talbot	8–1	Threave Rovers	Beechwood Park
15:00	Milliken 7'; Leishman 13'; Spence 14'; McCann 40'; Pope 52'; Gillies 70', 87'; Latta 89'	Report	Donley 17'

22 October 2011	Huntly	0–3	Queen's Park	Christie Park
15:00		Report	Longworth 44'; Burns 47'; Smith 78'	Attendance: 520; Referee: Dallas

22 October 2011	Montrose	2–1	Clyde	Links Park Stadium
15:00	Lunan 23'; Pierce 49'	Report	Neil 19'	Attendance: 452; Referee: Robertson

22 October 2011	Edinburgh City	0–1	Irvine Meadow	Meadowbank Stadium
15:00		Report	McGeown 59'

23 October 2011	East Stirlingshire	1–1	Buckie Thistle	Ochilview Park
15:00	Stirling 48'; Frances (yellow card) 90' (red card); Cane (red card) 90'	Report	Hunter 53' (o.g.)	Attendance: 372; Referee: Cook

Source: BBC
^{†} Spartans expelled for fielding an ineligible player. Culter progress to the Third Round.

==== Second round replays ====
29 October 2011	Inverurie Loco Works	3–2	Clachnacuddin	Harlaw Park
14:00	Gauld 50', 55', 56'	Report	MacDonald 30'; Urquhart 34'	Attendance: 365

29 October 2011	Elgin City	5–2	Fraserburgh	Borough Briggs
15:00	Hay 2' (o.g.); Gunn 3'; Crooks 30'; Cameron 34'; Nicolson 47'	Report	Johnston 24', 50'

29 October 2011	Annan Athletic	2–0	Alloa Athletic	Galabank
15:00	Gilfillan 28'; Muirhead 85'	Report		Attendance: 502

29 October 2011	Buckie Thistle	2–4 (a.e.t.)	East Stirlingshire	Victoria Park
15:00	MacMillan 51'; Chisholm 59'	Report	Stirling 3'; Coyne 30'; Gibson 94'; Team 113'	Attendance: 500

Source: BBC Sport

=== Third round ===
The Third Round draw was conducted on 26 October 2011 at Musselburgh Racecourse.

The 16 winners from the Second Round enter here, along with the 10 SFL Second Division clubs (Airdrie United, Albion Rovers, Arbroath, Brechin City, Cowdenbeath, Dumbarton, East Fife, Forfar Athletic, Stenhosemuir, Stirling Albion) and 6 SFL First Division clubs (Ayr United, Dundee, Greenock Morton, Livingston, Partick Thistle, Ross County)

19 November 2011	Culter	1–1	Partick Thistle	Crombie Park, Peterculter
13:30

19 November 2011	Ayr United	2–2	Montrose	Somerset Park, Ayr
15:00

19 November 2011	Irvine Meadow	0–6	Livingston	Meadow Park, Irvine
14:00

19 November 2011	Stirling Albion	1–2	Dundee	Forthbank Stadium, Stirling
15:00

19 November 2011	Stenhousemuir	4–0	Annan Athletic	Ochilview Park, Stenhousemuir
15:00

19 November 2011	Greenock Morton	5–1	Deveronvale	Cappielow, Greenock
15:00

19 November 2011	Airdrie United	11–0	Gala Fairydean	New Broomfield, Airdrie
15:00

19 November 2011	Keith	0–1	Arbroath	Kynoch Park, Keith
15:00

19 November 2011	Elgin City	1–1	Queen's Park	Borough Briggs, Elgin
15:00

19 November 2011	Stranraer	1–1	Forfar Athletic	Stair Park, Stranraer
15:00

19 November 2011	Inverurie Loco Works	2–4	Peterhead	Harlaw Park, Inverurie
15:00

19 November 2011	Ross County	4–0	Albion Rovers	Victoria Park, Dingwall
15:00

19 November 2011	Bo'ness United	0–3	Cowdenbeath	Newtown Park, Bo'ness
14:00

19 November 2011	Auchinleck Talbot	3–1	Vale of Leithen	Beechwood Park, Auchinleck
14:00

19 November 2011	Brechin City	3–0	Dumbarton	Glebe Park, Brechin
15:00

19 November 2011	East Fife	5–0	East Stirlingshire	Bayview Stadium, Methil
15:00

Source: BBC Sport

==== Third round replays ====
26 November 2011	Partick Thistle	4–0	Culter	Firhill Stadium, Glasgow
15:00	Elliot 1'; Cairney 26', 29'; Erskine 47'	Report		Attendance: 1,864; Referee: Des Roache

22 November 2011	Montrose	1–2	Ayr United	Links Park, Montrose
19:45	Winter 81'		Trouten 28', 73'	Attendance: 575; Referee: Mat Northcroft

26 November 2011	Queen's Park	3–1	Elgin City	Hampden Park, Glasgow
15:00	Murray 11'; Smith 43', 87'	Report	Clark (red card) 56'; Gunn 74'	Attendance: 513; Referee: Frank McDermott

26 November 2011	Forfar Athletic	3–0	Stranraer	Station Park, Forfar
15:00	Ross 67'; Templeman 76'; Gibson 87'	Report		Attendance: 423; Referee: Brian Colvin

Source: BBC Sport

=== Fourth round ===
The fourth round draw was conducted on 22 November 2011 at 10:30am at Hampden Park live on Sky Sports News.

The 16 winners from the third round entered here, along with the 12 SPL clubs (Aberdeen, Celtic, Dundee United, Dunfermline Athletic, Heart of Midlothian, Hibernian, Inverness Caledonian Thistle, Kilmarnock, Motherwell, Rangers, St Johnstone, St Mirren) and four SFL First Division clubs who were exempt from playing in the third round (Falkirk, Hamilton Academical, Queen of the South, Raith Rovers).

7 January	Ross County	7–0	Stenhousemuir	Victoria Park, Dingwall
15:00	Vigurs 5', 75'; Brittain 52' (pen.); Gardyne 62'; Craig 71'; Byrne 87', 88'	Report	McMillan (red card) 51'	Attendance: 1,421; Referee: Allan

7 January	Livingston	1–2	Ayr United	Almondvale Stadium, Livingston
15:00	McNulty 43'	Report	Geggan 39'; McGowan 52'	Attendance: 932; Referee: Salmond

7 January	Raith Rovers	1–2	Greenock Morton	Stark's Park, Kirkcaldy
15:00	Clarke 39'	Report	Campbell 67'; MacDonald 76' (pen.)	Attendance: 1,581; Referee: McLean

7 January	Heart of Midlothian	1–0	Auchinleck Talbot	Tynecastle Stadium, Edinburgh
15:00	G. Smith 84'	Report		Attendance: 8,895; Referee: Beaton

7 January	Cowdenbeath	2–3	Hibernian	Central Park, Cowdenbeath
15:00	Stewart 1'; Robertson 69'	Report	Griffiths 18'; Doyle 27'; Wotherspoon 54'	Attendance: 2,670; Referee: Madden

7 January	St Johnstone	2–1	Brechin City	McDiarmid Park, Perth
15:00	Davidson 6'; Sandaza 46'	Report	McManus 26'; McLauchlan (red card)	Attendance: 2,467; Referee: Tumilty

7 January	Forfar Athletic	0–4	Aberdeen	Station Park, Forfar
15:00		Report	Vernon 31'; Chalali 41'; Fallon 71'; Megginson 84'	Attendance: 3,747; Referee: Colvin

7 January	Partick Thistle	0–1	Queen of the South	Firhill Stadium, Glasgow
15:00		Report	Carmichael 89'	Attendance: 2,454; Referee: Roache

7 January	Inverness Caledonian Thistle	1–1	Dunfermline Athletic	Caledonian Stadium, Inverness
15:00	Gillet (red card) 29'; Hayes 90+4'	Report	Barrowman 30'	Attendance: 1,601; Referee: Norris

7 January	Falkirk	2–0	East Fife	Falkirk Stadium, Falkirk
15:00	Dods 7'; El Alagui 23'	Report		Attendance: 2,475; Referee: McKendrick

7 January	Motherwell	4–0	Queen's Park	Fir Park, Motherwell
15:00	Daley 5'; Murphy 21', 71'; Ojamaa 90'	Report		Attendance: 4,286; Referee: Clancy

8 January	Arbroath	0–4	Rangers	Gayfield Park, Arbroath
12:45		Report	Healy 18'; Wedderburn 22' (o.g.); Jelavić 59'; Kerkar 77'	Attendance: 5,895; Referee: Murray

8 January	Peterhead	0–3	Celtic	Balmoor Stadium, Peterhead
15:00		Report	Stokes 36', 57', 82'	Attendance: 4,600; Referee: Muir

7 January	Airdrie United	2–6	Dundee United	Excelsior Stadium, Airdrie
15:00	Donnelly 85', 90'	Report	Rankin 17'; Robertson 43'; Russell 62', 68', 84'; Mackay-Steven 71'	Attendance: 2,434; Referee: Charleston

7 January	Dundee	1–1	Kilmarnock	Dens Park, Dundee
12:30	Milne 46'	Report	Pascali 32'	Attendance: 3,446; Referee: O'Reilly

7 January	St Mirren	0–0	Hamilton Academical	St Mirren Park, Paisley
15:00		Report		Attendance: 3,091; Referee: Collum

Source: BBC Sport

==== Fourth round replays ====
17 January	Hamilton Academical	0–1	St Mirren	New Douglas Park, Hamilton
19:45		Report	Carey 21'	Attendance: 1,520; Referee: William Collum

17 January	Kilmarnock	2–1	Dundee	Rugby Park, Kilmarnock
19:45	Heffernan 35'; Shiels 44'	Report	Rae 63'	Attendance: 4,618; Referee: Stevie O'Reilly

18 January	Dunfermline Athletic	1–3 (a.e.t.)	Inverness Caledonian Thistle	East End Park, Dunfermline
19:45	Barrowman 40'	Report	Hayes 54'; Shinnie 93'; Tansey 110'	Attendance: 1,594; Referee: Euan Norris

Source: BBC Sport

=== Fifth round ===
The fifth round draw was conducted on 9 January 2012 at 2:30pm at Hampden Park live on Sky Sports News.

The 16 winners from the fourth round entered here.

4 February	Inverness Caledonian Thistle	0–2	Celtic	Caledonian Stadium, Inverness
12:45		Report	Samaras 33'; Brown 68' (pen.)	Attendance: 5,743; Referee: Calum Murray

4 February	Hibernian	1–0	Kilmarnock	Easter Road, Edinburgh
15:00	Doyle 15'	Report		Attendance: 8,198; Referee: Iain Brines

4 February	Motherwell	6–0	Greenock Morton	Fir Park, Motherwell
15:00	Hateley 9'; Murphy 29', 67'; Hutchinson 33'; Ojamaa 35'; Law 41'	Report		Attendance: 5,139; Referee: Euan Norris

4 February	St Mirren	1–1	Ross County	St Mirren Park, Paisley
15:00	Thompson 43'	Report	Brittain 40' (pen.)	Attendance: 3,334; Referee: Bobby Madden

4 February	Aberdeen	1–1	Queen of the South	Pittodrie Stadium, Aberdeen
15:00	Vernon 67'	Report	McLaughlin 54'	Attendance: 6,785; Referee: Steven McLean

5 February	Rangers	0–2	Dundee United	Ibrox Stadium, Glasgow
12:15		Report	Gunning 16'; Russell 35'	Attendance: 17,822; Referee: William Collum

5 February	Heart of Midlothian	1–1	St Johnstone	Tynecastle Stadium, Edinburgh
14:15	Templeton 10'	Report	MacKay (yellow card) 74' (red card); Sheridan 78'	Attendance: 9,185; Referee: Craig Thomson

15 February	Ayr United	2–1	Falkirk	Somerset Park, Ayr
19:45	Geggan 20'; Roberts 58' (pen.)	Report	Alston 7'	Attendance: 1,873; Referee: Crawford Allan

Source: BBC Sport

==== Fifth round replays ====
14 February	Queen of the South	1–2	Aberdeen	Palmerston Park, Dumfries
19:45	McGuffie 58' (pen.)	Report	Fyvie 21'; Considine 90'	Attendance: 3,102; Referee: Alan Muir

14 February	Ross County	1–2	St Mirren	Victoria Park, Dingwall
19:45		Report	Teale 14'; Thompson (red card) 37'; Hasselbaink 53'	Attendance: 2,334; Referee: Bobby Madden

14 February	St Johnstone	1–2 (a.e.t.)	Heart of Midlothian	McDiarmid Park, Perth
19:45	Davidson 84'	Report	Hamill 90' (pen.); Žaliūkas 117'	Attendance: 3,404; Referee: Brian Winter

Source: BBC Sport

=== Quarter-finals ===
The Quarter-finals draw was conducted on 6 February 2012 at 2:30pm at Hampden Park live on Sky Sports News.

10 March	Heart of Midlothian	2–2	St Mirren	Tynecastle Stadium, Edinburgh
12:30	Beattie 37'; Skácel 48'	Report	Carey 27'; Žaliūkas 84' (o.g.)	Attendance: 8,859; Referee: Stevie O'Reilly

10 March	Ayr United	0–2	Hibernian	Somerset Park, Ayr
15:00		Report	O'Donovan 6'; Griffiths 19' (pen.)	Attendance: 5,991; Referee: Steven McLean

11 March	Dundee United	0–4	Celtic	Tannadice Park, Dundee
13:15		Report	Ledley 53'; Samaras 71'; Stokes 86'; Brown 90' (pen.)	Attendance: 12,270; Referee: Iain Brines

11 March	Motherwell	1–2	Aberdeen	Fir Park, Motherwell
15:45	Law 79'	Report	Fallon 5', 41'	Attendance: 7,640; Referee: Craig Thomson

Source: BBC Sport

==== Quarter-final replay ====
21 March	St Mirren	0–2	Heart of Midlothian	St Mirren Park, Paisley
19:45		Report	Hamill 31'; Skácel 86'	Attendance: 5,291; Referee: Stevie O'Reilly

Source: BBC Sport

=== Semi-finals ===
The Semi-final draw was conducted on 11 March 2012 at Fir Park live on Sky Sports 3 & Sky Sports 3 HD following the Motherwell vs Aberdeen tie.

14 April	Aberdeen	1–2	Hibernian	Hampden Park, Glasgow
12:15	Fallon 59'	Report	O'Connor 3'; Griffiths 85'	Attendance: 28,278; Referee: William Collum

15 April	Celtic	1–2	Heart of Midlothian	Hampden Park, Glasgow
12:45	Hooper 87'	Report	Skácel 47'; Beattie 90+2' (pen.)	Attendance: 36,609; Referee: Euan Norris

Source: BBC Sport

=== Final ===
19 May	Hibernian	1–5	Heart of Midlothian	Hampden Park, Glasgow
15:00	McPake 41'	Report	Barr 15'; Skácel 27', 75'; Grainger 47' (pen.); McGowan 50'	Attendance: 51,041; Referee: Craig Thomson

Source: BBC Sport

== Awards ==
The Scottish Cup Player of the Round was decided by the fans, who cast their vote to choose a winner from a list of nominations on the official Scottish Cup Facebook page.

Round	Player of the Round	Ref
R4	Andy Leishman (Auchinleck Talbot)	
R5	Henrik Ojamaa (Motherwell)	
QF	Rory Fallon (Aberdeen)	
SF	Rudi Skacel (Heart of Midlothian)	
F	Rudi Skacel (Heart of Midlothian)	

== Media coverage ==
From round four onwards, selected matches from the Scottish Cup are broadcast live in Ireland and the UK by BBC Scotland and Sky Sports. BBC Scotland has the option to show one tie per round with Sky Sports showing two ties per round with one replay also. Both channels will screen the final live.

These matches were broadcast live on television.

Round	Sky Sports	BBC Scotland
Fourth round	Arbroath vs Rangers; Peterhead vs Celtic; Dunfermline Athletic vs Inverness CT (replay)	Dundee vs Kilmarnock
Fifth round	Inverness CT vs Celtic; Hearts vs St Johnstone	Rangers vs Dundee United
Quarter-finals	Dundee United vs Celtic; Motherwell vs Aberdeen; St Mirren vs Hearts (replay)	Hearts vs St Mirren
Semi-finals	Aberdeen vs Hibernian; Celtic vs Hearts	Aberdeen vs Hibernian
Final	Hibernian vs Hearts	Hibernian vs Hearts

=== Overseas ===
From round 4 onwards, Premium Sports showed matches live in the USA and Caribbean. Setanta Sports Australia show matches live in Australia.
