= 2008–09 Scottish Cup =

2008–09 Homecoming Scottish Cup
Tournament details
- Country: Scotland
- Teams: 82

Final positions
- Champions: Rangers
- Runners-up: Falkirk

Tournament statistics
- Matches played: 95
- Goals scored: 297 (3.13 per match)

The 2008–09 Scottish Cup was the 124th season of Scotland's most prestigious football knockout competition. The winners were Rangers, who defeated Falkirk in the 2009 final on 30 May 2009.

The competition was under new sponsorship. While the SFA sponsored the tournament last season, the new sponsor was Homecoming Scotland 2009, a project from the Scottish Government to encourage Scots from all over the world to visit the country. The tournament itself was known as The Homecoming Scottish Cup

Banks o' Dee, Bathgate Thistle, Lochee United and Pollok were the four junior clubs that entered this season.

== Calendar ==
| Round | First match date | Fixtures | | Clubs |
| Round | First match date | Original | Replays | Clubs |
|---|---|---|---|---|
| First Round | 27 September 2008 | 18 | 4 | 82 → 64 |
| Second Round | 25 October 2008 | 16 | 2 | 64 → 48 |
| Third Round | 29 November 2008 | 16 | 4 | 48 → 32 |
| Fourth Round | 10 January 2009 | 16 | 2 | 32 → 16 |
| Fifth Round | 7 February 2009 | 8 | 1 | 16 → 8 |
| Quarter-finals | 7 March 2009 | 4 | 1 | 8 → 4 |
| Semi-finals | 25 April 2009 | 2 | 0 | 4 → 2 |
| Final | 30 May 2009 | 1 | 0 | 2 → 1 |

== First round ==
The First Round draw was conducted at Castlehead High School, Paisley on 8 September 2008.

| 27 September 2008 | Banks O' Dee | 10–0 | Fort William | Spain Park, Aberdeen |
| 15:00 | Carstairs 24', 35'; Reid 30', 38'; Taylor 44', 72', 86' (pen.); Whyte 69' (pen.); Brownhill 70'; Phillips 89' | Report |

| 27 September 2008 | Clachnacuddin | 4–0 | Burntisland Shipyard | Grant Street Park, Inverness |
| 15:00 | Macmillan 19' (o.g.); Lawrie 29'; Ross 64'; Morrison 77' | Report |

| 27 September 2008 | Dalbeattie Star | 5–1 | Lossiemouth | Islecroft Stadium, Dalbeattie |
| 15:00 | Milligan 68', 86', 89', 90'; Sloan 81' | Report | Lasley 27' |

| 27 September 2008 | Edinburgh City | 2–0 | Nairn County | Meadowbank Stadium, Edinburgh |
| 15:00 | Ross 25'; Bruce 53' | Report |

| 27 September 2008 | Edinburgh University | 1–2 | Civil Service Strollers | Peffermill, Edinburgh |
| 15:00 | Dick 10' | Report | Burgess 64'; Dickson 82' |

| 27 September 2008 | Fraserburgh | 6–3 | Hawick Royal Albert | Bellslea Park, Fraserburgh |
| 15:00 | Stephen 7', 45'; Clark 17' (o.g.); West 27'; Main 77'; Johnstone 77' | Report | Smith 35'; Hamilton 51'; Knox 78' |

| 27 September 2008 | Glasgow University | 0–1 | Vale of Leithen | Garscube Sports Complex, Glasgow |
| 15:00 | | | Shortreed 82' |

| 27 September 2008 | Golspie Sutherland | 0–3 | Threave Rovers | King George V, Golspie |
| 15:00 | | | Cook 28', 59'; Beattie 89' |

| 27 September 2008 | Huntly | 1–0 | Girvan | Christie Park, Huntly |
| 15:00 | Soane 10' | Report |

| 27 September 2008 | Inverurie Loco Works | 5–2 | Deveronvale | Harlaw Park, Inverurie |
| 15:00 | Simpson 21'; McLean 33'; Smith 36'; Gauld 39'; Coull 47' | Report | McKenzie 58' (pen.), 79' |

| 27 September 2008 | Lochee United | 3–1 | Bathgate Thistle | Thomson Park, Dundee |
| 14:30 | Hagen 70' (pen.); Carlin (?); Cargill (?) | Report | Menmuir 21' |

| 27 September 2008 | Newton Stewart | 1–1 | Brora Rangers | Blairmount Park, Newton Stewart |
| 15:00 | Sutherland 89' (pen.) | Report | Cameron 12' |

| 27 September 2008 | Pollok | 1–1 | Spartans | Newlandsfield Park, Glasgow |
| 15:00 | Dingwall 15' | Report | Walker 29' (pen.) |

| 27 September 2008 | Preston Athletic | 3–1 | Gala Fairydean | Pennypit Park, Prestonpans |
| 15:00 | Miller 2'; Manson 31', 56' | Report | Gibson 24' |

| 27 September 2008 | Rothes | 1–3 | Buckie Thistle | Mackessack Park, Rothes |
| 15:00 | Shortreed 45' | | Charlesworth 58'; Low 71'; Shewan 89' |

| 27 September 2008 | Selkirk | 1–1 | Coldstream | Yarrow Park, Selkirk |
| 15:00 | Stephen 90' (pen.) | | Bolton 85' |

| 27 September 2008 | St Cuthbert Wanderers | 0–3 | Wick Academy | St. Mary's Park, Kirkcudbright |
| 15:00 | | Report | Weir 23', 48', 89' |

| 27 September 2008 | Wigtown & Bladnoch | 2–2 | Forres Mechanics | Trammondford Park, Wigtown |
| 15:00 | McClymont 43'; White 57' | | Sharp 11'; Allan 86' (pen.) |

Source: ESPN Soccernet

=== Replays ===
| 4 October 2008 | Brora Rangers | 2–1 (a.e.t.) | Newton Stewart | Dudgeon Park, Brora |
| 15:00 | Inglis 24' ? (?) | | McColm 48' |

| 4 October 2008 | Coldstream | 2–2 (a.e.t.) (2–3 p) | Selkirk | Home Park, Coldstream |
| 15:00 |

| 4 October 2008 | Forres Mechanics | 2–0 | Wigtown & Bladnoch | Mosset Park, Forres |
| 15:00 |

| 4 October 2008 | Spartans | 1–0 | Pollok | City Park, Edinburgh |
| 15:00 | Walker 85' | | | Attendance: 640; Referee: G Aitken |

Source: ESPN Soccernet

== Second round ==
The Second Round draw was conducted at Lochee United's Thomson Park, Dundee on 27 September 2008.

| 25 October 2008 | Berwick Rangers | 1–2 | Albion Rovers | Shielfield Park, Berwick |
| 15:00 | Gribben 32' | Report | Coyne 35'; Harris 71' | Attendance: 259; Referee: A Law |

| 25 October 2008 | Brora Rangers | 1–3 | Forfar Athletic | Dudgeon Park, Brora |
| 15:00 | MacKay 69' (pen.) | Report | Gordon 17'; Dunn 52'; Campbell 76' | Attendance: 200; Referee: A Mather |

| 25 October 2008 | Clachnacuddin | 1–0 | Crichton | Grant Street Park, Inverness |
| 15:00 | Ross 20' | | | Attendance: 120; Referee: C Allan |

| 25 October 2008 | Cove Rangers | 1–0 | Whitehill Welfare | Allan Park, Cove Bay, Aberdeen |
| 15:00 | Stephen 59' | | | Attendance: 250; Referee: G Aitken |

| 25 October 2008 | Cowdenbeath | 1–2 | Elgin City | Central Park, Cowdenbeath |
| 15:00 | McQuade 50' | Report | Kaczan 27'; Wright 71' | Attendance: 328; Referee: C Boyle |

| TBC | Dalbeattie Star | 6–0 | Selkirk | Islecroft Stadium, Dalbeattie |
| TBC | Milligan 19', 69', 79'; Redpath 31'; Harkness 89' |

| 25 October 2008 | Edinburgh City | 0–0 | Wick Academy | Meadowbank Stadium, Edinburgh |
| 15:00 |

| 25 October 2008 | Forres Mechanics | 1–1 | Keith | Mosset Park, Forres |
| 15:00 | Collins 40' | | Lennox 69' | Attendance: 233; Referee: J Beaton |

| 25 October 2008 | Fraserburgh | 0–1 | Dumbarton | Bellslea Park, Fraserburgh |
| 15:00 | | Report | Chisholm 54' | Attendance: 517; Referee: B Colvin |

| 25 October 2008 | Inverurie Loco Works | 5–1 | Banks O' Dee | Harlaw Park, Inverurie |
| 15:00 | Forbes 2' (o.g.); Smith 23'; Ross 46'; D Milne 81', 83' | | Taylor 77' |

| 25 October 2008 | Lochee United | 3–0 | Buckie Thistle | Thomson Park, Dundee |
| 14:30 | Robertson 32', 55'; Middleton 55' | | | Attendance: 202; Referee: D Roche |

| 25 October 2008 | Montrose | 2–0 | Huntly | Links Park, Montrose |
| 15:00 | Davidson 13'; Smith 67' | Report | | Attendance: 523; Referee: M Northcoth |

| 25 October 2008 | Stenhousemuir | 5–0 | Threave Rovers | Ochilview Park, Stenhousemuir |
| 15:00 | Thom 32'; Motion 53'; Shirra 67', 90'; Thomson 73' | Report | | Attendance: 247; Referee: G Salmond |

| 26 October 2008 | East Stirlingshire | 4–2 | Preston Athletic | Ochilview Park, Stenhousemuir |
| 15:00 | Rodgers 25' (pen.); Graham 72'; Cramb 84'; Anderson 90' | Report | Miller 14'; MacAuley 48' (pen.) | Attendance: 382; Referee: B Madden |

| 1 November 2008 | Annan Athletic | 1–2 | Spartans | Galabank, Annan |
| 15:00 | Neilson 10' | Report | Malin 48'; Archibald 50' | Attendance: 652; Referee: S Nicholls |

| 1 November 2008 | Civil Service Strollers | 0–1 | Vale of Leithen | The Edinburgh Area; Civil Service Sports Association, Muirhouse, Edinburgh |
| 15:00 | | | Summerville 77' | Referee: B Cooke |

Source: ESPN Soccernet:,,

=== Replays ===
| 1 November 2008 | Keith | 1–1 (a.e.t.) (0–3 p) | Forres Mechanics | Kynoch Park, Keith |
| 15:00 | Wood 65' | | Penwright 66' | Attendance: 325 |

| 1 November 2008 | Wick Academy | 1–4 | Edinburgh City |
| 15:00 | Weir 45' | | Ross 19', 51', 57'; Hall 90' | Referee: B Madden |

Source: ESPN Soccernet

== Third round ==
The Third Round draw was conducted on 27 October 2008. Six matches were postponed, all because of frozen pitches. They were rescheduled for the following Saturday. However, only two of those matches were played on that day, Elgin City v Spartans and Forres Mechanics v Dalbeattie Star. The other matches were repeatedly postponed because of poor weather. The Edinburgh City v Brechin City tie was eventually played on 8 December 2008 and the Inverurie Loco Works v Vale of Leithen tie on 13 December 2008. The Lochee United v Ayr United match was played on Tuesday, 23 December 2008.

On 11 December 2008, the match between Elgin City and Spartans was ordered to be replayed after Elgin had fielded Joe Malin, a loanee from Ross County, in a 2–1 win. Malin was not registered in time for the original tie, but played in the rescheduled tie. The match was ordered to be played on 15 December. It later emerged that Spartans had also fielded an ineligible player, Dean Hoskins, after an administrative error.

| 29 November 2008 | Airdrie United | 3–0 | Cove Rangers | Excelsior Stadium, Airdrie |
| 15:00 | Cardle 20'; Lynch 38', 41' | Report | | Attendance: 821; Referee: G Salmond |

| 29 November 2008 | Albion Rovers | 1–2 | Queen's Park | Cliftonhill, Coatbridge |
| 15:00 | Barr 63' | Report | Watt 11'; Cairney 52' (pen.) | Attendance: 619; Referee: T Robertson |

| 29 November 2008 | Clachnacuddin | 0–5 | Stenhousemuir | Grant Street Park, Inverness |
| 15:00 | | Report | Dalziel 13' 28'; Desmond 53'; Dalziel 78'; Hampshire 90' | Attendance: 350; Referee: G Hilland |

| 29 November 2008 | Clyde | 2–0 | Montrose | Broadwood Stadium, Cumbernauld |
| 15:00 | McKay 38'; Clarke 87' (pen.) | Report | | Attendance: 677; Referee: S McLean |

| 29 November 2008 | East Fife | 2–0 | Arbroath | Bayview Stadium, Methil |
| 15:00 | Crawford 70'; O'Reilly 90' | Report | | Attendance: 729; Referee: A Law |

| 29 November 2008 | East Stirlingshire | 2–1 | Livingston | Ochilview Park, Stenhousemuir |
| 15:00 | Forrest 9'; Graham 55' | Report | Fox 39' | Attendance: 563; Referee: C Charleston |

| 29 November 2008 | Peterhead | 2–1 | Greenock Morton | Balmoor, Peterhead |
| 15:00 | Ross 74'; Bavidge 90' | Report | Greacen (?) | Attendance: 817; Referee: S MacDonald |

| 29 November 2008 | Raith Rovers | 0–0 | Alloa Athletic | Stark's Park, Kirkcaldy |
| 15:00 | | Report | | Attendance: 1,493; Referee: W Collum |

| 29 November 2008 | Ross County | 2–2 | Dumbarton | Victoria Park, Dingwall |
| 15:00 | Higgins 23' 57' | Report | Carcary 80' 83' | Attendance: 1,200; Referee: S O'Reily |

| 29 November 2008 | Stirling Albion | 2–3 | Partick Thistle | Forthbank Stadium, Stirling |
| 15:00 | Molloy 55'; Murphy 89' | Report | Chaplain 28'; Harkins 33' (pen.); Buchanan 83' | Attendance: 1,472; Referee: C Richmond |

| 6 December 2008 | Forres Mechanics | 2–2 | Dalbeattie Star | Mosset Park, Forres |
| 15:00 | Sharpe 30'; Collins 77' | Report | Steel 85'; Sloan 89' (pen.) | Attendance: 378; Referee: N Watters |

| 8 December 2008 | Edinburgh City | 0–3 | Brechin City | Meadowbank Stadium, Edinburgh |
| 19:45 | | Report | Diack 5' 16' 43' (pen.) | Attendance: 333; Referee: M Northcroft |

| 13 December 2008 | Inverurie Loco Works | 4–0 | Vale of Leithen | Harlaw Park, Inverurie |
| 15:00 | Tan 1'; Milne 22'; Smith 55' 62' | Report | | Attendance: 608; Referee: B Madden |

| 15 December 2008 | Elgin City | 1–2 | Spartans | Borough Briggs, Elgin |
| 19:45 | MacKay 5' (pen.); Nicolson (red card) 90' | Report | Kader 36'; Malin 72' | Attendance: 551; Referee: C Brown |

| 15 December 2008 | Forfar Athletic | 2–0 | Stranraer | Station Park, Forfar |
| 19:45 | Gibson 83'; Kilgannon 90' | Report | Dobbins (red card) 50'; McKinstry (red card) 70' | Attendance: 305; Referee: S Nicholson |

| 17 December 2008 | Lochee United | 1–1 | Ayr United | Thomson Park, Dundee |
| 13:30 | Hagan 86' | Report | Williams 60' | Attendance: 1,223; Referee: B Corcoran |

Source: ESPN Soccernet:,, ,

=== Replays ===
| 9 December 2008 | Alloa Athletic | 2–1 | Raith Rovers | Recreation Park, Alloa |
| 19:45 | Ferguson 79', 82' | Report | Wales 56' | Attendance: 860; Referee: W Collum |

| 15 December 2008 | Dalbeattie Star | 2–4 (a.e.t.) | Forres Mechanics | Islecroft Stadium, Dalbeattie |
| 13:00 | MacBeth 22'; Redpath 94' | Report | Allan 66' (pen.); Green 92', 101'; Whyte 112' | Attendance: 378; Referee: I Brines |

| 15 December 2008 | Dumbarton | 1–2 | Ross County | Strathclyde Homes Stadium, Dumbarton |
| 19:45 | Gordon 46' | Report | Brittain 24' (pen.); Hart 37' | Attendance: 557; Referee: S O'Reilly |

| 23 December 2008 | Ayr United | 3–1 | Lochee United | Somerset Park, Ayr |
| 19:45 | McGowan 36'; Gormley 53'; Prunty 58' | Report | Blackwood 76'; Cargill (red card) | Attendance: 2,049; Referee: C Colvin |

Source: ESPN Soccernet:,,

== Fourth round ==
The Fourth Round Draw was conducted on 1 December 2008. Three matches were postponed due to failed pitch inspections, The first postponement, Inverurie Loco Works v Motherwell was rescheduled for 21 January but was not played (following 2 further postponements) until 2 February, whereas the Brechin City v St Mirren and Forfar Athletic v Forres Mechanics fixtures were both scheduled and played on 13 January.

| 10 January 2009 | Airdrie United | 2–1 | Spartans | Excelsior Stadium, Airdrie |
| 15:00 | di Giacomo 26'; Lynch 43' | Report | Malin 54' | Attendance: 1,460; Referee: A Muir |

| 10 January 2009 | Alloa Athletic | 1–2 | Aberdeen | Recreation Park, Alloa |
| 15:00 | Scott 40' (pen.) | Report | Miller 7'; Aluko 56' | Attendance: 3,013; Referee: S Nicholls |

| 10 January 2009 | Ayr United | 2–2 | Kilmarnock | Somerset Park, Ayr |
| 15:00 | Keenan 14'; Williams 90' | Report | Pascali 9'; Bryson 54' | Attendance: 9,280; Referee: S Conroy |

| 10 January 2009 | Celtic | 2–1 | Dundee | Celtic Park, Glasgow |
| 15:00 | Brown 37'; McGeady 44' | Report | McMenamin 14' | Attendance: 23,070; Referee: C Murray |

| 10 January 2009 | Dunfermline Athletic | 2–0 | Clyde | East End Park, Dunfermline |
| 15:00 | Phinn 20'; Bayne 66' | Report | | Attendance: 2,871; Referee: S O'Reilly |

| 10 January 2009 | Falkirk | 4–2 | Queen of the South | Falkirk Stadium, Falkirk |
| 15:00 | Arfield 37' (pen.), 48'; Barrett 68', 80' | Report | Wilson 41'; Harris 47' | Attendance: 3,423; Referee: C Richmond |

| 10 January 2009 | Inverness Caledonian Thistle | 3–0 | Partick Thistle | Caledonian Stadium, Inverness |
| 15:00 | Morais 28', 56'; Vigurs 46' | Report | | Attendance: 1,803; Referee: E Smith |

| 10 January 2009 | Peterhead | 2–2 | Queen's Park | Balmoor, Peterhead |
| 15:00 | Bavidge 17'; Anderson 73' | Report | Brough 35'; Cairney 43' | Attendance: 842; Referee: D Somers |

| 10 January 2009 | Ross County | 0–1 | Hamilton Academical | Victoria Park, Dingwall |
| 15:00 | | Report | Swailes 22'; McArthur (red card) 90' | Attendance: 2,300; Referee: C Allan |

| 10 January 2009 | Stenhousemuir | 0–1 | East Fife | Ochilview Park, Stenhousemuir |
| 15:00 | | Report | Linn 84' | Attendance: 784; Referee: E Norris |

| 11 January 2009 | Hibernian | 0–2 | Heart of Midlothian | Easter Road, Edinburgh |
| 12:15 | Fletcher (red card) 31' | Report | Nadé 38'; Glen 90' | Attendance: 14,837; Referee: C Thomson |

| 11 January 2009 | East Stirlingshire | 0–4 | Dundee United | Ochilview Park, Stenhousemuir |
| 15:00 | | Report | Buaben 15'; Dods 40'; Daly 43'; Russell 55' (pen.) | Attendance: 2,153; Referee: M Tumilty |

| 13 January 2009 | Brechin City | 1–3 | St Mirren | Glebe Park, Brechin |
| 19:45 | Jancyzk 46' | Report | Hamilton 25' (pen.), 70'; Wyness 56' | Attendance: 1,026; Referee: S Finnie |

| 13 January 2009 | Forfar Athletic | 6–1 | Forres Mechanics | Station Park, Forfar |
| 19:45 | Gibson 2'; Bremner 4' (o.g.); Tulloch 24'; Campbell 31'; Gordon 43', 54' | Report | Green 23' | Attendance: 775; Referee: S McLean |

| 13 January 2009 | St Johnstone | 0–2 | Rangers | McDiarmid Park, Perth |
| 20:05 | | Report | McCaffrey 43' (o.g.); Novo 78' | Attendance: 7,746; Referee: D McDonald |

| 2 February 2009 | Inverurie Loco Works | 0–3 | Motherwell | Harlaw Park, Inverurie |
| 19:45 | | Report | Sutton 2', 69'; Clarkson 57' | Attendance: 2,500; Referee: W Collum |

Source: ESPN Soccernet: ,,,

=== Replays ===
| 20 January 2009 | Queen's Park | 1–0 | Peterhead | Hampden Park, Glasgow |
| 19:45 | Holms 51' | Report | | Attendance: 782; Referee: D Somers |

| 22 January 2009 | Kilmarnock | 3–1 | Ayr United | Rugby Park, Kilmarnock |
| 19:30 | Ford 50', 80'; Taouil 76'; Fernandez (red card) 69' | Report | Prunty 10' | Attendance: 11,563; Referee: S Conroy |

Source: ESPN Soccernet:,

== Fifth round ==
The Fifth Round Draw was conducted on 11 January 2009 at Hibernian's Easter Road. Three matches were postponed, the Aberdeen v East Fife match because of adverse weather in and around the city, and the Airdrie United v Dunfermline Athletic and Forfar Athletic v Rangers because of frozen pitches. All have been rescheduled for 18 February.

| 7 February 2009 | Celtic | 2–1 | Queen's Park | Celtic Park, Glasgow |
| 15:00 | Caldwell 19'; McDonald 45' | Report | Coakley 66', (red card) 81' | Attendance: 22,223; Referee: W Collum |

| 7 February 2009 | Hamilton Academical | 2–1 | Dundee United | New Douglas Park, Hamilton |
| 15:00 | Swailes 47', 55' | Report | Grainger 35' | Attendance: 3,058; Referee: C Richmond |

| 7 February 2009 | Heart of Midlothian | 0–1 | Falkirk | Tynecastle Stadium, Edinburgh |
| 15:00 | Žaliūkas (red card) 82' | Report | Lovell 59'; Arfield (red card) 90' | Attendance: 14,569; Referee: D McDonald |

| 7 February 2009 | Inverness Caledonian Thistle | 2–0 | Kilmarnock | Caledonian Stadium, Inverness |
| 15:00 | Mihadjuks 36'; Rooney 90' | Report | Kyle (red card) 68' | Attendance: 2,578; Referee: I Brines |

| 7 February 2009 | Motherwell | 1–1 | St Mirren | Fir Park, Motherwell |
| 15:00 | Hughes 65' | Report | Dorman 12' | Attendance: 5,695; Referee: C Thomson |

| 17 February 2009 | Aberdeen | 5–0 | East Fife | Pittodrie Stadium, Aberdeen |
| 19:45 | Wright 11'; Vidal 16'; McDonald 29' (o.g.); Maguire 82', 84' | Report | McCulloch (red card) 4' | Attendance: 8,960; Referee: S Conroy |

| 17 February 2009 | Airdrie United | 1–2 | Dunfermline Athletic | Excelsior Stadium, Airdrie |
| 19:45 | McLaughlin 14' (pen.) | Report | Holmes 2'; Bayne 73' | Attendance: 1,772; Referee: C Murray |

| 18 February 2009 | Forfar Athletic | 0–4 | Rangers | Station Park, Forfar |
| 19:45 | Smith (red card) 70' | Report | Papac 8'; Miller 54', 90'; Aarón 84' | Attendance: 4,718; Referee: E Smith |

Source: ESPN Soccernet:,,

=== Replay ===
| 19 February 2009 | St Mirren | 1–0 | Motherwell | St Mirren Park, Paisley |
| 19:45 | Mehmet 85' | Report | | Attendance: 4,555; Referee: C Thomson |

Source: ESPN Soccernet

== Quarter-finals ==
The Quarter-final draw was conducted on 9 February 2009 at Hampden Park.

7 March 2009
12:15

| St Mirren | 1–0 | Celtic |
|---|---|---|
| Mehmet 55' (pen.) | Report |

New St Mirren Park, Paisley
Attendance: 5,925
Referee: C Richmond

7 March 2009
15:00

| Dunfermline Athletic | 1–1 | Aberdeen |
|---|---|---|
| Phinn 82' | Report | Aluko 61' |

East End Park, Dunfermline
Attendance: 9,696
Referee: C Thomson

7 March 2009
15:00

| Inverness CT | 0–1 | Falkirk |
|---|---|---|
| | Report | Finnigan 31' (pen.) |

Caledonian Stadium, Inverness
Attendance: 3,024
Referee: S Conroy

8 March 2009
15:00

| Rangers | 5–1 | Hamilton Academical |
|---|---|---|
| Whittaker 15'; Lafferty 35', 81'; Ñíguez 45' (pen.); Davis 53' | Report | Quinn 26' |

Ibrox Stadium, Glasgow
Attendance: 27,588
Referee: I Brines

=== Replay ===
18 March 2009
19:45

| Aberdeen | 0–0 (a.e.t.) | Dunfermline Athletic |
|---|---|---|
| | Report |
Penalties
| Duff (penalty scored); Severin (penalty missed); Mulgrew (penalty scored); Foster (penalty missed) | 2–4 Aberdeen went first | (penalty scored) Glass; (penalty scored) Woods; (penalty scored) Burke; (penalty scored) Bayne |

Pittodrie Stadium, Aberdeen
Attendance: 13,567
Referee: E Smith

== Semi-finals ==
The Semi-final draw was conducted on 8 March 2009 at Ibrox Stadium.

25 April 2009
12:15

| Rangers | 3–0 | St Mirren |
|---|---|---|
| Velička 2'; Boyd 66'; Miller 70' | Report |

Hampden Park, Glasgow
Attendance: 32,431
Referee: C Murray

26 April 2009
15:00

| Falkirk | 2–0 | Dunfermline Athletic |
|---|---|---|
| Scobbie 54'; Arfield 89' (pen.) | Report |

Hampden Park, Glasgow
Attendance: 17,124
Referee: D McDonald

== Final ==
30 May 2009
15:00

| Rangers | 1–0 | Falkirk |
|---|---|---|
| Novo 46' | Report |

Hampden Park, Glasgow
Attendance: 50,956
Referee: Craig Thomson

== Media coverage ==
- Domestically, both Sky Sports and BBC Sport Scotland broadcast selected live games, with both showing the final. Both also carry highlights of all games in every round.
- BBC Radio Scotland has exclusive domestic radio rights to the tournament.
- Through the SFA's international media partner IMG, the Scottish Cup is broadcast in various territories around the world. In Australia, for example, the Scottish Cup is currently available on Setanta Sports.

These matches were broadcast live on television.

| Round | Sky Sports | BBC Scotland |
|---|---|---|
| Fourth round | Hibernian vs Heart of Midlothian; Kilmarnock vs Ayr United (Replay) | St Johnstone vs Rangers |
| Fifth round | Forfar Athletic vs Rangers; St Mirren vs Motherwell (Replay) | |
| Quarter-finals | St Mirren vs Celtic; Aberdeen vs Dunfermline Athletic (Replay) | Rangers vs Hamilton Academical |
| Semi-finals | Rangers vs St Mirren | Falkirk vs Dunfermline Athletic |
| Final | Rangers vs Falkirk | Rangers vs Falkirk |

== Largest Wins ==
A list of the largest wins from the competition.

| Score | Home team | Away team | Stage |
|---|---|---|---|
| 10-0 | Banks O' Dee | Fort William | First Round |
| 6-0 | Dalbeattie Star | Selkirk | Second Round |
| 6-1 | Forfar Athletic | Forres Mechanics | Fourth Round |
| 5-0 | Stenhousemuir | Threave Rovers | Second Round |
| 5-0 | Aberdeen | East Fife | Fifth Round |
| 0-5 | Clachnacuddin | Stenhousemuir | Third Round |
