= 2013–14 Scottish Cup =

2013–14 William Hill Scottish Cup
Tournament details
- Country: Scotland
- Teams: 82

Final positions
- Champions: St Johnstone
- Runners-up: Dundee United

The 2013–14 Scottish Cup was the 129th season of Scotland's most prestigious football knockout competition. The tournament began on 14 September 2013 and ended on 17 May 2014. It was sponsored by bookmaker William Hill in the third season of a five-year partnership after a two-year extension was agreed, and was known as the William Hill Scottish Cup. The winner of the competition qualified for the second qualifying round of the 2014–15 UEFA Europa League.

St Johnstone won their first ever Scottish Cup after a 2–0 win against Dundee United in the final.

== Format and calendar ==
Thirty six clubs enter from the first round, sixteen from the Highland League, three qualifying Junior clubs and seventeen other clubs affiliated with the Scottish Football Association. Scottish League Two clubs enter in the second round along with the top two clubs from the previous season's Highland League and the winners of both the South of Scotland League and the East of Scotland League. Scottish League One and six Scottish Championship clubs start in the third round, while the remaining four Championship clubs and all Scottish Premiership clubs enter in the fourth round.

The calendar for the 2013–14 competition is as follows:

Round	Draw date	First match date	Fixtures		Clubs
Round	Draw date	First match date	Original	Replays	Clubs
First round	Thursday 8 August 2013	Saturday 14 September 2013	18	2	82 → 64
Second round	Monday 16 September 2013	Saturday 5 October 2013	16	6	64 → 48
Third round	Monday 7 October 2013	Saturday 2 November 2013	16	3	48 → 32
Fourth round	Tuesday 5 November 2013	Friday 29 November 2013	16	4	32 → 16
Fifth round	Monday 2 December 2013	Friday 7 February 2014	8	1	16 → 8
Quarter-finals	Sunday 9 February 2014	Saturday 8 March 2014	4	1	8 → 4
Semi-finals	Sunday 9 March 2014	Saturday 12 & Sunday 13 April 2014	2	N/A	4 → 2
Final	N/A	Saturday 17 May 2014	1	N/A	2 → 1

== First round ==
The first round draw took place on 8 August 2013 at the Hampden Park, at 1:15pm.

This round is contested entirely by non-league clubs:

- Fifteen SFA full member clubs from the Highland Football League: (Brora Rangers, Buckie Thistle, Clachnacuddin, Deveronvale, Forres Mechanics, Fort William, Fraserburgh, Huntly, Inverurie Loco Works, Keith, Lossiemouth, Nairn County, Rothes, Turriff United and Wick Academy)
- Five SFA full member clubs from the East of Scotland League: (Burntisland Shipyard, Civil Service Strollers, Coldstream, Edinburgh University, Hawick Royal Albert)
- Three SFA full member clubs from the South of Scotland League: (Newton Stewart, St Cuthbert Wanderers, Wigtown & Bladnoch)
- Seven SFA full member clubs from the Lowland Football League: (Edinburgh City, Gala Fairydean Rovers, Preston Athletic, Selkirk, Spartans, Threave Rovers, Vale of Leithen)
- Three SFA full member clubs in other leagues: (Girvan, Glasgow University, Golspie Sutherland)
- Three qualifiers from the Scottish Junior Football Association: (Auchinleck Talbot, Culter, Linlithgow Rose)

14 September 2013	Edinburgh University	0–2	Spartans	East Peffermill, Edinburgh
15:00		ESPN	35', 43' Donal Henretty	Referee: Colin Steven

14 September 2013	Threave Rovers	3–0	Rothes	Meadow Park, Castle Douglas
15:00	Steven Degnan 55', 62'; Shaun Milligan 81'	ESPN		Referee: David McKniff

14 September 2013	Golspie Sutherland	0–4	Edinburgh City	King George V Park, Golspie
15:00		ESPN	9', 13', 48' Ian McFarland; 60' Grant Vanson	Referee: Graham Fraser

14 September 2013	Huntly	3–4	Preston Athletic	Christie Park, Huntly
15:00	Andrzej Kleczkowski 4'; Alex Thoirs 44'; Marek Mádle51 88'	ESPN	51' Michael Osbourne; 68', 69' Gary McCormack; 78' Sean Martin	Referee: Andy Milne

14 September 2013	Coldstream	0–6	Wick Academy	Home Park, Coldstream
15:00		ESPN	12', 30' David Allan; 60' Gary Weir; 65' Sam Mackay; 82', 90' Craig Shearer	Referee: Gavin Ross

14 September 2013	Girvan	1–5	Auchinleck Talbot	Hamilton Park, Girvan
15:00	Craig Harvey 58'	ESPN	8' David Gormley; 40', 51', 69' Keir Milliken; 88' Michael McCann	Referee: Steven Reid

14 September 2013	Selkirk	1–3	Turriff United	Yarrow Park, Selkirk
15:00	Jacob Crolla 58'	ESPN	30' Cammy Bowden; 75', 81' (pen.) Gary McGowan	Referee: Gavin Duncan

14 September 2013	Fort William	0–0	Newton Stewart	Claggan Park, Fort William
15:00		ESPN		Referee: Craig Napier

14 September 2013	Forres Mechanics	4–5	Keith	Mosset Park, Forres
15:00	Lee Fraser 13'; Neil Whyte 20', 44'; Simon Allan 48'	ESPN	35' Martin Wood; 41' (pen.), 60' Jonathan Smith; 62', 78' Andy MacAskill	Referee: Morag Pirie

14 September 2013	Fraserburgh	4–0	Civil Service Strollers	Bellslea Park, Fraserburgh
15:00	Scott Barbour 54', 57', 88'; William West 82'	ESPN		Referee: Martin Kerrigan

14 September 2013	Gala Fairydean Rovers	3–1	Glasgow University	Netherdale, Galashiels
15:00	Marc Berry 26'; Jason Inglis 75'; Stuart Noble 86'	ESPN	2' Paul Gallagher	Referee: James Campbell

14 September 2013	Wigtown & Bladnoch	3–4	Buckie Thistle	Trammandford Park, Wigtown
15:00	Ian Miller 75'; Adam Dougan 85'; Robert Jamieson 90'	ESPN	2' Lewis MacKinnon; 23' Fraser Forbes; 29' Chris Angus; 47' Jamie Shewan	Referee: Steven Kirkland

14 September 2013	Brora Rangers	1–0	Vale of Leithen	Dudgeon Park, Brora
15:00	Steven MacKay 90'	ESPN		Referee: Craig Sim

14 September 2013	Deveronvale	5–0	Clachnacuddin	Princess Royal Park, Banff
15:00	Martin Charlesworth 10'; Shawn Scott 44', 69'; Graeme Rodger 52'; Graeme Watt 89'	ESPN		Referee: Thomas Shaw

14 September 2013	Inverurie Loco Works	3–0	Burntisland Shipyard	Harlaw Park, Inverurie
15:00	Dean Donaldson 35', 53'; Andy Hunter 89'	ESPN		Referee: Mike Roncone

14 September 2013	Hawick Royal Albert	0–1	St Cuthbert Wanderers	Albert Park, Hawick
15:00		ESPN	30' Grant Middlemiss	Referee: Mike Taylor

14 September 2013	Lossiemouth	0–0	Culter	Grant Park, Lossiemouth
15:00		ESPN		Referee: Graham Beaton

14 September 2013	Linlithgow Rose	2–0	Nairn County	Prestonfield, Linlithgow
15:00	Wayne Mackintosh 26' (o.g.); Steven Meechan 85'	ESPN

=== Replays ===
21 September 2013	Culter	3–1	Lossiemouth	Crombie Park, Peterculter
15:00	George McBain 65', 86'; Allan Youngson 90'	ESPN	50' Willie Mathers	Referee: Graham Beaton

21 September 2013	Newton Stewart	3–1	Fort William	Trammondford Park, Wigtown
15:00	Liam Muir 30', 38', 70'	ESPN	62' Darren Quigg	Referee: Craig Napier

== Second round ==
The second round draw took place on 16 September 2013 at Hampden Park.

All ten teams from the Scottish League Two entered the competition at this stage, along with the champions of the South of Scotland League (Dalbeattie Star) and East of Scotland League (Whitehill Welfare), and the champions and runners-up from the Highland League (Cove Rangers and Formartine United).

5 October 2013	Gala Fairydean Rovers	0–3	Clyde	Netherdale, Galashiels
15:00		Report

5 October 2013	Turriff United	4–2	Wick Academy	The Haughs, Turriff
15:00		Report

5 October 2013	Albion Rovers	1–0	Spartans	Cliftonhill Stadium, Coatbridge
15:00		Report

5 October 2013	Queen's Park	2–2	Preston Athletic	Hampden Park, Glasgow
15:00		Report

5 October 2013	Brora Rangers	1–1	Cove Rangers	Dudgeon Park, Brora
15:00		Report

5 October 2013	Dalbeattie Star	0–1	Montrose	Islecroft Stadium, Dalbeattie
15:00		Report

5 October 2013	Edinburgh City	4–4	Fraserburgh	Meadowbank Stadium, Edinburgh
15:00		Report

5 October 2013	Berwick Rangers	2–1	Peterhead	Shielfield Park, Tweedmouth
15:00		Report

5 October 2013	Keith	0–4	Elgin City	Kynoch Park, Keith
15:00		Report

6 October 2013	East Stirlingshire	6–0	Threave Rovers	Ochilview Park, Stenhousemuir
15:00		Report

5 October 2013	Stirling Albion	2–2	Whitehill Welfare	Forthbank Stadium, Stirling
15:00		Report

5 October 2013	Auchinleck Talbot	4–0	St Cuthbert Wanderers	Beechwood Park, Auchinleck
15:00		Report

5 October 2013	Formartine United	0–2	Inverurie Loco Works	North Lodge Park, Pitmedden
15:00		Report

5 October 2013	Newton Stewart	0–6	Culter	Trammondford Park, Wigtown
15:00		Report

5 October 2013	Buckie Thistle	0–0	Annan Athletic	Victoria Park, Buckie
15:00		Report

5 October 2013	Deveronvale	2–2	Linlithgow Rose	Princess Royal Park, Banff
15:00		Report

=== Replays ===
12 October 2013	Cove Rangers	0–3	Brora Rangers	Allan Park, Aberdeen
15:00		Report	Sutherland 32' (pen.); Mackay 68'; Maclean 82'	Referee: Thomas Shaw

12 October 2013	Fraserburgh	2–0	Edinburgh City	Bellslea Park, Fraserburgh
15:00	West 61', 76'	Report		Referee: Steven Reid

12 October 2013	Linlithgow Rose	1–3	Deveronvale	Prestonfield, Linlithgow
15:00	Smith 5'	Report	Cowie 27'; Fraser 75'; Charlesworth 82' (pen.)	Referee: David Munro

12 October 2013	Preston Athletic	1–2	Queen's Park	Pennypit Park, Prestonpans
15:00	Ramsay 50'	Report	Spittal 13', 38'	Referee: Nick Walsh

12 October 2013	Whitehill Welfare	1–2	Stirling Albion	Ferguson Park, Rosewell
15:00	Bishop 44' (o.g.)	Report	White 31'; Cunningham 90+4'	Referee: Colin Steven

19 October 2013	Annan Athletic	4–0	Buckie Thistle	Galabank, Annan
15:00	Love 13'; Flynn 36', 45'; MacKay 90'	Report		Referee: Euan Anderson

== Third round ==
Sixteen teams joined in the 3rd round: all ten current Scottish League One clubs, along with six Scottish Championship clubs. The Third Round draw was conducted on 7 October 2013 at 1:00pm at Hampden Park live on official Scottish Cup YouTube Site.

2 November 2013	Forfar Athletic	2–1	East Fife	Station Park, Forfar
15:00

2 November 2013	Culter	1–1	Berwick Rangers	Crombie Park, Peterculter
14:00

2 November 2013	Elgin City	3–5	Dunfermline Athletic	Borough Briggs, Elgin
15:00

2 November 2013	Stranraer	2–2	Auchinleck Talbot	Stair Park, Stranraer
15:00

2 November 2013	Alloa Athletic	3–0	Inverurie Loco Works	Recreation Park, Alloa
15:00

2 November 2013	Ayr United	3–2	Queen's Park	Somerset Park, Ayr
15:00

1 November 2013	Rangers	3–0	Airdrieonians	Ibrox Stadium, Glasgow
19:45	Daly 48', 51'; Templeton 79'	Rangers Report		Attendance: 22,533; Referee: John Beaton

2 November 2013	Dumbarton	2–1	Cowdenbeath	The Bet Butler Stadium, Dumbarton
15:00

2 November 2013	Arbroath	0–2	Brechin City	Gayfield Park, Arbroath
15:00

2 November 2013	Stenhousemuir	2–2	Annan Athletic	Ochilview Park, Stenhousemuir
15:00

2 November 2013	Fraserburgh	2–1	Montrose	Bellslea Park, Fraserburgh
15:00

2 November 2013	Turriff United	0–3	Stirling Albion	The Haughs, Turriff
15:00

3 November 2013	East Stirlingshire	0–2	Raith Rovers	Ochilview Park, Stenhousemuir
15:00		BBC Report	Smith 48'; McGowan 80' (o.g.)	Referee: Don Robertson

2 November 2013	Albion Rovers	1–0	Deveronvale	Cliftonhill Stadium, Coatbridge
15:00

2 November 2013	Clyde	2–1	Brora Rangers	Broadwood Stadium, Cumbernauld
15:00

2 November 2013	Queen of the South	1–0	Hamilton Academical	Palmerston Park, Dumfries
15:00

=== Replays ===
9 November 2013	Auchinleck Talbot	2–3	Stranraer	Beechwood Park, Auchinleck
14:00	Latta 59'; Gormley 77'	BBC Report	Longworth 5', 31'; Gallagher 88'	Referee: Craig Charleston

9 November 2013	Berwick Rangers	3–1	Culter	Shielfield Park, Berwick-upon-Tweed
15:00	O'Brien 17'; Dalziel 51'; Lavery 85'	BBC Report	Youngson 82' (pen.)	Referee: Gavin Ross

12 November 2013	Annan Athletic	2–4 (a.e.t.)	Stenhousemuir	Galabank, Annan
19:30	Todd 32'; Hopkirk 50'	BBC Report	Gemmell 78' (pen.); Dickson 90'; McMillan (red card) 97'; Lynch 105'; McNeil 107'	Referee: Des Roache

== Fourth round ==
All 12 Scottish Premiership clubs entered here along with the four Scottish Championship clubs who were exempt from playing in the Third Round. The Fourth Round draw was conducted on 5 November 2013 at 12:00pm at Hampden Park live on Sky Sports News.

30 November 2013	Falkirk	0–2	Rangers	Falkirk Stadium, Falkirk
12:15	McCracken (red card) 57'	BBC Report	Law 89'; Templeton 90+3'	Attendance: 6,228; Referee: Brian Colvin

30 November 2013	Albion Rovers	1–0	Motherwell	New Douglas Park, Hamilton
15:00	G. Phillips 90'	BBC Report		Attendance: 2,950; Referee: Euan Anderson

30 November 2013	Berwick Rangers	1–3	Dumbarton	Shielfield Park, Berwick-upon-Tweed
15:00	Currie 8'	BBC Report	Prunty 30' (pen.); Megginson 43'; Linton 56'	Attendance: 406; Referee: Des Roache

30 November 2013	Clyde	1–1	Stranraer	Broadwood Stadium, Cumbernauld
15:00	MacDonald 15'	BBC Report	Longworth 44'	Attendance: 681; Referee: Alan Muir

29 November 2013	Dundee United	5–2	Kilmarnock	Tannadice Park, Dundee
19:45	Robertson 27', 75'; Armstrong 64'; Graham 82' (pen.); Mackay-Steven 84'	BBC Report	Barr 48'; C. Johnston 50'	Attendance: 6,979; Referee: Calum Murray

30 November 2013	Queen of the South	2–2	St Mirren	Palmerston Park, Dumfries
15:00	Russell 35'; Paton 72'	BBC Report	Newton 9'; Thompson 51'	Attendance: 2,176; Referee: Kevin Clancy

30 November 2013	Stenhousemuir	3–0	Fraserburgh	Ochilview Park, Stenhousemuir
15:00	McNeil 63', 88'; Douglas 90'	BBC Report		Attendance: 487; Referee: Kevin Graham

30 November 2013	Brechin City	1–1	Forfar Athletic	Glebe Park, Brechin
15:00	Ewan Moyes (red card) 32'; Trouten 53'	BBC Report	Malcolm (red card) 6'; Fotheringham 90'; Baxter (red card) 90'	Attendance: 724; Referee: John McKendrick

30 November 2013	Alloa Athletic	3–2	Stirling Albion	Recreation Park, Alloa
15:00	McCord 51' (pen.); Holmes 59'; Marr 90'	BBC Report	White 10'; Weir 90'	Attendance: 1,278; Referee: Stevie O'Reilly

30 November 2013	Ross County	0–1	Hibernian	Victoria Park, Dingwall
15:00		BBC Report	Handling 31'	Attendance: 2,213; Referee: Craig Thomson

30 November 2013	Dundee	0–1	Raith Rovers	Dens Park, Dundee
15:00		BBC Report	Irvine 8' (o.g.)	Attendance: 3,184; Referee: Steven McLean

30 November 2013	St Johnstone	2–0	Livingston	McDiarmid Park, Perth
15:00	May 24'; Jahic 62'	BBC Report		Attendance: 2,294; Referee: Andrew Dallas

1 December 2013	Partick Thistle	0–1	Aberdeen	Firhill Stadium, Glasgow
12:45		BBC Report	Considine 5'	Attendance: 3,642; Referee: Bobby Madden

1 December 2013	Heart of Midlothian	0 − 7	Celtic	Tynecastle Stadium, Edinburgh
15:00		BBC Report	Commons 3', 21', 59' (pen.); Brown 34', 75'; Ledley 42'; Lustig 44'	Attendance: 10,636; Referee: William Collum

30 November 2013	Ayr United	1–1	Dunfermline Athletic	Somerset Park, Ayr
15:00	Donald 59'	BBC Report	Geggan 14'	Attendance: 1,391; Referee: Stephen Finnie

30 November 2013	Inverness Caledonian Thistle	4–0	Greenock Morton	Caledonian Stadium, Inverness
15:00	Ross 45' (pen.); McKay 71', 90'; Doran 90' (pen.)	BBC Report		Referee: Don Robertson

=== Replays ===
4 December 2013	Dunfermline Athletic	1–0	Ayr United	East End Park, Dunfermline
19:45	Ry. Thomson 60'	BBC Report		Attendance: 1,932; Referee: Stephen Finnie

10 December 2013	Stranraer	4–1	Clyde	Stair Park, Stranraer
19:45	Stirling 60'; McKeown 61'; Longworth 88'; Grehan 90'	BBC Report	Watt 54'	Attendance: 454; Referee: Alan Muir

10 December 2013	St Mirren	3–0	Queen of the South	St Mirren Park, Paisley
19:45	Harkins 19'; Thompson 74'; Kelly 87'	BBC Report		Attendance: 2,775; Referee: John Beaton

10 December 2013	Forfar Athletic	3–3 (a.e.t.) (4–3 p)	Brechin City	Station Park, Forfar
19:45	Templeman 19', 108'; Malin 85'	BBC Report	A.Jackson 7'; Trouten 50' (pen.); Walker 95'	Attendance: 811; Referee: John McKendrick
	Penalties
	McManus (penalty scored); Malin (penalty scored); Fusco (penalty scored); Campbell (penalty missed); Smith (penalty scored)		(penalty missed) Brown; (penalty scored) S. Jackson; (penalty scored) Trouten; (penalty scored) Hay (penalty missed)

== Fifth round ==
The Fifth Round draw was conducted on 2 December 2013 at 2:00pm at Hampden Park live on Sky Sports News.

Holders Celtic were knocked out of the competition by Aberdeen on 8 February.

7 February 2014	Rangers	4–0	Dunfermline Athletic	Ibrox Stadium, Glasgow
19:30	Shiels 8', 24', 47'; Templeton 37'	Report		Attendance: 19,396; Referee: Bobby Madden

8 February 2014	Celtic	1–2	Aberdeen	Celtic Park, Glasgow
12:45	Stokes 8'	Report	Anderson 38'; Pawlett 50'	Attendance: 30,413; Referee: William Collum

8 February 2014	Hibernian	2–3	Raith Rovers	Easter Road, Edinburgh
14:00	Stanton 14'; Nelson 45+2'	Report	Moon 6'; Hill 45'; Anderson 62'	Attendance: 10,503; Referee: Steven McLean

8 February 2014	Alloa Athletic	0–1	Dumbarton	Recreation Park, Alloa
15:00		Report	Nish 31'	Attendance: 749; Referee: Calum Murray

8 February 2014	Stranraer	2–2	Inverness Caledonian Thistle	Stair Park, Stranraer
15:00	Grehan 45' (pen.); Longworth 72'	Report	Doran 40'; McKay 74'	Attendance: 722; Referee: Kevin Clancy

8 February 2014	Albion Rovers	2–0	Stenhousemuir	Cliftonhill, Coatbridge
15:00	McMillan 24' (o.g.); Philips 67'	Report		Attendance: 748; Referee: Brian Colvin

8 February 2014	Forfar Athletic	0–4	St Johnstone	Station Park, Forfar
15:00		Report	Croft 27'; Wright 42'; O'Halloran 64'; Dunne 80'	Attendance: 1,803; Referee: John Beaton

9 February 2014	Dundee United	2–1	St Mirren	Tannadice Park, Dundee
12:00	Gauld 21'; Çiftçi 51'	Report	McLean 26' (pen.)	Attendance: 4,952; Referee: Craig Thomson

=== Replay ===
18 February 2014	Inverness Caledonian Thistle	2–0	Stranraer	Caledonian Stadium, Inverness
19:45	Ross 3'; Doran 90'	Report		Attendance: 1,458; Referee: Alan Muir

== Quarter-finals ==
The Quarter-finals draw was conducted on 9 February 2014 at Tannadice Park live on Sky Sports 2.

8 March 2014	Raith Rovers	1–3	St Johnstone	Stark's Park, Kirkcaldy
12:15	Cardle 21'	Report	McDonald 4'; Hasselbaink 49'; Anderson 79'	Attendance: 3,767; Referee: Craig Thomson

8 March 2014	Aberdeen	1–0	Dumbarton	Pittodrie Stadium, Aberdeen
15:00	Rooney 53'	Report		Attendance: 10,600; Referee: Kevin Clancy

9 March 2014	Inverness CT	0–5	Dundee United	Caledonian Stadium, Inverness
12:30	Tansey (red card) 44'; Watkins (red card) 72'	Report	Çiftçi 16', 28'; Gunning 36' (pen.); Mackay-Steven 49'; Armstrong 57'	Attendance: 3,164; Referee: Willie Collum

9 March 2014	Rangers	1–1	Albion Rovers	Ibrox Stadium, Glasgow
15:30	Mohsni 78'	Report	Donnelly 14'	Attendance: 23,976; Referee: John Beaton

=== Replay ===
17 March 2014	Albion Rovers	0–2	Rangers	New Douglas Park, Hamilton
19:45		Report	Aird 18'; Daly 57'	Attendance: 5,354; Referee: John Beaton

== Semi-finals ==
The Semi-finals draw was conducted on 9 March 2014 at Ibrox Stadium live on Sky Sports 1.

12 April 2014	Rangers	1–3	Dundee United	Ibrox Stadium, Glasgow
12:45	Smith 42'	Report	Armstrong 23'; Mackay-Steven 36'; Çiftçi 83'	Attendance: 41,059; Referee: Bobby Madden

13 April 2014	St Johnstone	2–1	Aberdeen	Ibrox Stadium, Glasgow
12:45	May 61', 84'	Report	McGinn 15'	Attendance: 19,057; Referee: Willie Collum

== Final ==
17 May 2014
15:00

St Johnstone	2−0	Dundee United
Anderson 45+1'; MacLean 84'	Report

Celtic Park, Glasgow
Attendance: 47,345
Referee: Craig Thomson

== Media coverage ==
From round four onwards, selected matches from the Scottish Cup are broadcast live in Ireland and the UK by BBC Scotland and Sky Sports. BBC Scotland has the option to show one tie per round with Sky Sports showing two ties per round with one replay also. Both channels will screen the final live.

These matches were broadcast live on television.

Round	Sky Sports	BBC Scotland
Fourth round	Falkirk vs Rangers; Partick Thistle vs Aberdeen	Hearts vs Celtic
Fifth round	Celtic vs Aberdeen; Dundee United vs St Mirren	Rangers vs Dunfermline Athletic
Quarter-finals	Raith Rovers vs St Johnstone; Rangers vs Albion Rovers; Albion Rovers vs Rangers (replay)	Inverness CT vs Dundee United
Semi-finals	Rangers vs Dundee United; St Johnstone vs Aberdeen	St Johnstone vs Aberdeen
Final	St Johnstone vs Dundee United	
