= William Wilson (footballer, born 1921) =

Scottish footballer

Personal information
- Date of birth: 1921
- Place of birth: Dumfries, Scotland
- Position: Goalkeeper

Senior career*
Years	Team	Apps	(Gls)
- Crichton Royal
1946–1950	Queen of the South	27	(0)
1950–1956	Clyde	81	(0)
- * Club domestic league appearances and goals

William Wilson (born 1921) was a Scottish professional footballer who played as a goalkeeper.

Wilson was born in Dumfries and played in the local amateur scene for Crichton Royal before joining hometown club Queen of the South. At Queens he was unable to secure a regular game ahead of Roy Henderson and was transferred to Clyde, for whom he broke a finger in the 1955 Scottish Cup semi-final against Dave Halliday's Aberdeen and thus missed the final win against Celtic. In charge of the semi-final was referee Bob Davidson, father of another Queen of the South goalkeeper Alan Davidson.
