= 2025–26 South of Scotland Football League =

South of Scotland Football League
- Season: 2025–26
- Dates: 26 July 2025 – 6 May 2026
- Champions: Dalbeattie Star
- Promoted: Dalbeattie Star; Newton Stewart
- Matches: 110
- Goals: 498 (4.53 per match)
- Biggest home win: Dalbeattie Star 15–0 St Cuthbert Wanderers (14 January 2026)
- Biggest away win: Wigtown & Bladnoch 0–10 Lochar Thistle (8 November 2025)
- Highest scoring: Dalbeattie Star 15–0 St Cuthbert Wanderers (14 January 2026)
- Longest winning run: 13 matches: Stranraer reserves
- Longest unbeaten run: 14 matches: Stranraer reserves
- Longest winless run: 12 matches: St Cuthbert Wanderers
- Longest losing run: 6 matches: Wigtown & Bladnoch
- All statistics correct as of 6 May 2026.

The 2025–26 South of Scotland Football League was the 80th season of the South of Scotland Football League, and the 12th season as part of the sixth tier of the Scottish football pyramid system. Lochar Thistle were the reigning champions.

Dalbeattie Star won the league title on 18 April 2026, following their 11–0 win over Wigtown & Bladnoch, which took them out of reach of Stranraer reserves.

== Teams ==
Location of teams in 2025–26 South of Scotland Football League

The following teams changed divisions after the 2024–25 season.

=== From South of Scotland League ===
Moved to Dumfries Sunday Amateur Football League

- Upper Annandale

=== Stadia and locations ===
Team	Location	Home ground	Surface	Capacity	Seats	Floodlit
Abbey Vale	New Abbey	Maryfield Park	Grass	800	48	No
Creetown^{[SFA]}	Creetown	Castle Cary Park	Grass	500	0	Yes
Dalbeattie Star^{[SFA]}	Dalbeattie	Islecroft Stadium	Grass	1,320	100	Yes
Lochar Thistle	Dumfries	Wilson Park	Grass	600	0	Yes
Lochmaben	Lochmaben	Whitehills Park	Grass	1,000	0	No
Mid-Annandale	Lockerbie	New King Edward Park	Artificial	500	0	Yes
Newton Stewart^{[SFA]}	Newton Stewart	Blairmount Park	Artificial	1,000	0	Yes
Nithsdale Wanderers	Sanquhar	Lorimer Park	Grass	1,000	0	Yes
St Cuthbert Wanderers^{[SFA]}	Kirkcudbright	St Mary's Park	Artificial	1,000	0	Yes
Stranraer reserves	Stranraer	Stranraer Academy	Artificial	1,000	0	Yes
Wigtown & Bladnoch^{[SFA]}	Wigtown	Trammondford Park	Grass	888	0	Yes

^{SFA} Club with an SFA licence eligible for promotion to the Lowland League West should they win the league or finish as runners-up, and also compete in the Scottish Cup.

Stranraer reserves are ineligible for promotion.

== League table ==
Pos	Team	Pld	W	D	L	GF	GA	GD	Pts	Qualification
1	Dalbeattie Star (C, P)	20	17	1	2	83	9	+74	52	Promotion to the Lowland League West
2	Stranraer reserves	20	16	2	2	83	24	+59	50	Ineligible for promotion
3	Lochar Thistle	20	15	1	4	70	24	+46	46	
4	Newton Stewart (P)	20	14	2	4	59	24	+35	44	Promotion to the Lowland League West
5	Creetown	20	8	3	9	31	27	+4	27	
6	Abbey Vale	20	8	3	9	44	42	+2	27	
7	Lochmaben	20	6	5	9	39	53	−14	23	
8	Mid-Annandale	20	4	3	13	30	66	−36	15	
9	Nithsdale Wanderers	20	3	4	13	31	76	−45	13	
10	Wigtown & Bladnoch	20	3	1	16	11	75	−64	10	
11	St Cuthbert Wanderers	20	1	5	14	17	78	−61	8	

Source: South of Scotland Football League
Rules for classification: 1) Points; 2) Goal difference; 3) Number of goals scored
(C) Champions; (P) Promoted

== Results ==
Home \ Away	ABB	CRE	DAL	LOT	LOC	MID	NEW	NIT	SCW	STR	WIG
Abbey Vale		1–3	0–2	3–5 (Note: Match played at the North West Community Campus, Dumfries.)	3–0	4–1	2–4 (Note: Match played at the North West Community Campus, Dumfries.)	7–2	2–2 (Note: Match played at the North West Community Campus, Dumfries.)	0–7	4–0
Creetown	0–1		0–1	0–2	1–2 (Note: Match played at St Mary's Park, Kirkcudbright.)	2–1	0–4	1–1	5–0 (Note: Match played at Stranraer Academy, Stranraer.)	1–0	2–0
Dalbeattie Star	2–0	1–0		4–1	6–1 (Note: Match played at the North West Community Campus, Dumfries.)	3–0 (Note: Match played at the North West Community Campus, Dumfries.)	0–1	8–0	15–0 (Note: Match played at the North West Community Campus, Dumfries.)	1–0	11–0
Lochar Thistle	2–0	3–0	1–3		4–0 (Note: Match played at the North West Community Campus.)	7–0	1–0	5–1	5–1	1–1	0–1
Lochmaben	1–1	2–2	0–3	1–5		1–1	2–3	4–2	3–3	2–7	4–1
Mid-Annandale	3–3	1–3	0–4	2–4	1–5		2–3	6–2	3–2	0–2	2–1
Newton Stewart	1–2	1–0	1–1	2–3	6–1	4–1		5–2	2–0	1–1	4–0
Nithsdale Wanderers	1–4	3–3	1–5	0–6	1–1	4–1	1–2		1–2	0–5	2–0
St Cuthbert Wanderers	0–6	4–0	0–5	0–3	0–4	2–2	0–7	1–1		2–5	0–2 (Note: Match played at Blairmount Park, Newton Stewart.)
Stranraer reserves	5–1	3–2	2–1	5–2	3–2	10–1	4–3	10–1	2–1		1–0
Wigtown & Bladnoch	1–0	0–2	1–7	0–10 (Note: Match played at the North West Community Campus, Dumfries.)	0–3	0–2	1–5	0–5	1–1	2–10 (Note: Match played at Blairmount Park, Newton Stewart.)	

Source: South of Scotland Football League
Legend: Blue = home team win; Yellow = draw; Red = away team win.
