= Sean MacAuley =

Scottish footballer

Personal information
- Full name: Sean MacAuley
- Date of birth: 27 February 1980 (age 46)
- Place of birth: Edinburgh, Scotland
- Position: Midfielder

Team information
- Current team: Preston Athletic

Youth career
- 1997–2000: Links United

Senior career*
Years	Team	Apps	(Gls)
2000–2001	Clyde	4	(0)
2001–2005	East Stirlingshire	112	(9)
2005–	Preston Athletic		
- * Club domestic league appearances and goals as of 17:38, 8 January 2009 (UTC)

Sean MacAuley (born 27 February 1980 in Edinburgh), is a Scottish football midfielder who plays for Preston Athletic.

MacAuley joined Clyde in the summer of 2000, signing from Edinburgh amateur club Links United. He never established himself in the first team, making only 5 appearances, before joining East Stirlingshire in March 2001. He spent over 4 years with the Shire, before signing for non-league Preston Athletic.
