= Lochar Thistle F.C. =

Lochar Thistle
- Full name: Lochar Thistle Football Club
- Founded: 1969
- Ground: Wilson Park, Heathhall, Dumfries
- Capacity: 1,000
- Coordinates: 55°5′37″N 3°34′12″W
- Chairman: Ian McKnight
- Manager: Scott Wilby
- League: South of Scotland League
- 2025–26: South of Scotland League, 3rd of 11
Home colours	Away colours

Lochar Thistle Football Club are a football club originating in 1969 from the villages of Locharbriggs and Heathhall in the town of Dumfries in Scotland.

They originally competed in the Dumfries & District Amateur Football League where they were First Division Champions on three occasions. The club also went on a record 42-game unbeaten League run between 2010 and 2012. They joined the South of Scotland Football League for the 2013–14 season. They play their home games at Wilson Park, Heathhall which accommodates approximately 1,000 spectators. The club was accredited in December 2015 with the Standard Level Quality Mark from the SFA and have maintained this level throughout the years.

The club have won The Potts Cup in 2015–16 season and were also the first winners of the Alba Cup in the 2016–17 season.

In 2009, 80 year old club stalwart, George Kirk was awarded Volunteer of the Year in Amateur football.

The club is currently managed by Ritchie Maxwell.

Lochar won their first ever South of Scotland Football League title during the 2024–25 season, becoming champions with a game to spare.

== Honours ==
- South of Scotland Football League: 2024–25
- South of Scotland League Cup: 2023–24, 2024-25
- Alba Cup: 2016–17, 2024–25
- SCFA Potts Cup: 2015–16, 2023-24
- WDFA Cree Lodge Cup: 2022–23
- Tweedie Cup: 2023-24
