= Creetown F.C. =

Association football club in Scotland

Creetown
- Full name: Creetown Football Club
- Nickname: The Ferrytoun
- Founded: 1905
- Ground: Castlecary Park, Creetown
- Capacity: 2,000
- Coordinates: 54°53′39″N 4°22′59″W
- Manager: Martin McCaulay
- League: South of Scotland League
- 2025–26: South of Scotland League, 5th of 11
Home colours	Away colours

Creetown Football Club is a football club based in Creetown in the Dumfries and Galloway area of Scotland. Formed in 1905 as Creetown Rifle Volunteers Football Club, they adopted their present name in 1920. They originally played their home matches at Barholm Park, which had been the ground of Barholm Rovers, who went out of existence in 1905. They now play their home matches at Castlecary Park, which accommodates up to 2,000 spectators. Their strip (uniform) colours are yellow and black.

For the 2009–10 season, Creetown played their home matches 12 miles away at Ballgreen Park in Kirkcowan, which was the home of the now defunct Tarff Rovers, while upgrading work took place at Castlecary Park to bring the facilities up to league standards.

They presently compete in the South of Scotland Football League. Their best finish to date is second in the 2004–05 season and the 2022–23 season.

In 2023, Creetown received an Entry Level License from the Scottish Football Association, allowing them to compete in the Scottish Cup for the first time since the 1934–35 Scottish Cup. They played their first game in the competition in 88 years in the preliminary round of the 2023–24 edition, hosting East of Scotland Football League First Division club Whitehill Welfare.

== Honours ==
- Southern Counties Challenge Cup: 1984–85
- Cree Lodge Cup: 1936–37, 2003–04, 2004–05
- Dumfries and Galloway cup: 1957,1960 and 1981.
- Potts Cup: 1933–34, 1934–35, 1981–82
- South League Cup: 2005–06
- Haig Gordon Memorial Trophy: 2003–04
- Tweedie Cup: 1934–35, 2002–03, 2003–04
- Wigtownshire & District Cup: 1935–36
- Wigtownshire Cup: 1934–35, 1935–36
- Wigtownshire & Kirkcudbrightshire Cup: 1933–34, 1934–35, 1937–38
