= Lochmaben F.C. =

Association football club in Dumfries and Galloway, Scotland

Lochmaben FC
- Full name: Lochmaben Football Club
- Founded: 1972 as Auldgirth FC dissolved 2016 (following a merger)
- Ground: Whitehills Park, Lochmaben
- Capacity: 1,000
- Coordinates: 55°7′56″N 3°26′10″W
- Manager: Nathan Doyle
- League: South of Scotland League
- 2025–26: South of Scotland League, 7th of 11
Home colours	Away colours

Lochmaben Football Club is a Scottish football based in Lochmaben, Dumfries and Galloway. The club took on its current name after a merger with Crichton in 2016. They currently compete in the South of Scotland League.

== History ==
=== Crichton ===
Crichton F.C. logo

The most recent incarnation of the club formed in 1972 as Auldgirth Football Club playing in local amateur leagues. Auldgirth FC was renamed to Blackwood Dynamos Football Club before a 1999 rename to reflect their home ground is Crichton Hospital Park. They were originally to adopt the title Crichton Royal Football Club, but never assumed the Royal part of the name. Their strip consisted of blue and white.

They formerly competed in the South of Scotland Football League, which they joined in the 1992–93 season. They won the South of Scotland League Cup in the 2002–03 season.

Manager Jim Thompson guided the club to their best-ever season in 2007–08, as they won the league title. Winning the South of Scotland League gave Crichton passage to the 2008–09 Scottish Cup. Having received a bye in the first round, they played Inverness side Clachnacuddin away in the second round on 25 October 2008, where they lost 1–0.

On 3 May 2015, it was announced that the club would fold after 43 years. This was due to their chairman and two committee members leaving a committee which was already at the bare bones. In June 2015, it was announced that the club would merge with local amateur side Lochmaben Amateurs. The club played its home fixtures for the 2015–16 season at Hospital Park after a season playing away from their home ground.

=== Lochmaben ===
Before the start of the 2016–17 season, Crichton effectively folded as part of a merger with Lochmaben Amateurs and the club moved to Lockerbie and now play under the Lochmaben name. They initially played at New King Edward Park, ground sharing with Mid-Annandale. In 2019 the club returned to Lochmaben after a new pavilion was constructed at Whitehills Park.

== Honours ==
As Crichton FC

South of Scotland Football League

- Winners : 2007–08

South of Scotland Football League Cup

- Winners: 2002–03

== Notable former players ==
- George Cloy
- Billy Houliston
- William Wilson
