= Dalbeattie Star F.C. =

Association football club in Scotland

Dalbeattie Star
- Full name: Dalbeattie Star Football Club
- Nickname: The Star
- Founded: 1905, re-formed 1976
- Ground: Islecroft Stadium, Dalbeattie
- Capacity: 1,320 (100 seated)
- Coordinates: 54.9350°N 3.8173°W
- Chairman: Kenny Murray
- Manager: David Taylor
- League: Lowland League West
- 2025–26: South of Scotland League, 1st of 11 (promoted)
- Website: https://dalbeattiestarfc.com/
Home colours	Away colours

Dalbeattie Star Football Club is a Scottish association football club based in Dalbeattie, Dumfries and Galloway. It currently competes in the Lowland League West.

The club had previously played in the Lowland League. Home matches are played at Islecroft Stadium in Dalbeattie, and as an SFA member they also play in the Scottish Cup.

== History ==
The club was founded in 1905 but folded in 1948. It was re-formed in 1976, playing in the South of Scotland League.

In 2001 Dalbeattie joined the East of Scotland League, playing in the league for eight seasons and finishing as runners-up in 2008–09, before returning to the South of Scotland League.

They reached the third round of the 2008–09 Scottish Cup, before losing to Highland League side Forres Mechanics 2–4 after extra time, following a very creditable 2–2 draw at Mosset Park.

The Star finished runners-up behind Threave Rovers in their first season back in the South of Scotland League, and the Castle Douglas side prevailed again in 2010–11. Although pushed all the way, a 0–2 home defeat by Threave in the penultimate game of the season tipped the title race in favour of the champions.

In 2011–12, Dalbettie won the South of Scotland League for the first time since 1988–89, finishing the league season unbeaten having won 21 of the 24 matches. The title was clinched with a 1–1 draw away to Threave Rovers, the defending champions. As well as the league, the Star also won four cups – the Challenge Cup, League Cup, Potts Cup and the Haig Gordon Cup, meaning the 2011–12 season was one of the best ever in the club's history.

The following season, 2012–13, Star retained the league title with a couple of games to spare, though their long unbeaten league was ended (41 games). The South of Scotland Challenge Cup and the League Cup were also retained with wins over Nithsdale Wanderers and Threave Rovers, and the Tweedie Cup was won with another victory over Threave.

In the summer of 2013 Star joined the newly formed Lowland League. In the inaugural season of the league Star finished a creditable third and though 2013–14 was not trophy laden like the previous two seasons, significant progress was made on the park with some excellent results and performances. There were big disappointments as well, none more so than a second SFA South Region Challenge Cup final defeat in a row, this time to East Kilbride (0–2) at Palmerston. The following season the club finished fourth in the league but again missed out on silverware in the cups. Manager Paul McGinley announced in February that he would be stepping down at the end of the season. Darren Kerr was named as the new boss for 2015–16 season. In his four years in charge, Star won the South of Scotland Challenge Cup twice (2016–17 & 2017–18) and held on to their Lowland League status. At the end of season 2018–19 Kerr left the club by mutual consent and was replaced by Ritchie Maxwell, who had enjoyed a highly successful nine-year spell as a player at Islecroft.

In 2021–22 Star won their first five league matches and briefly sat top of the Lowland League though they would end the term 12th. The club enjoyed their best Scottish Cup run for a number of years including a first away win over a Highland League side when they beat Rothes 1–0. Midway through the season manager Ritchie Maxwell announced he would have to step down due to a change in his work circumstances and his assistant Chris Jardine took over for the remainder. He led the team to Southern Counties Challenge Cup success beating Caledonian Braves 3–2 in the final at Galabank. He too had to turn the job down due to work and Jordan Williamson was announced as the new manager for season 2022–23 after leading St. Cuthbert Wanderers to the South league title. Unfortunately things did not work out well under Williamson's leadership and he was soon replaced by Eddie Warwick. However Star's ten-year stay in the Lowland League eventually came to an end with relegation and a return to the South of Scotland League.

In season 2023–24, Star won the South of Scotland League title.

== Ground ==
Islecroft Stadium
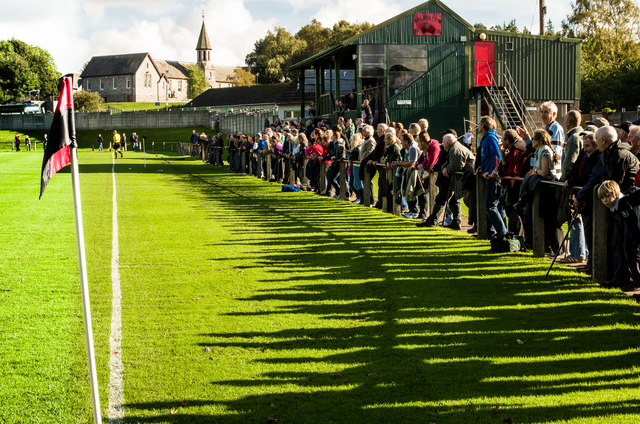

- Location in Dumfries and Galloway
- Location: Dalbeattie, Scotland
- Coordinates: 54°56′5.96″N 3°49′2.8″W
- Capacity: 1,320 (100 seated)
- Surface: Grass
- Field size: 96 x 64m

Construction
- Opened: 1950

Tenant
- Dalbeattie Star

Dalbeattie Star play their home matches at Islecroft Stadium, in the northeast of the town. It has a capacity of 1,320 and features a 100-seater stand. Floodlights were added in 2016.

== Coaching staff ==
As of 07 May 2025

Position	Name
Manager	David Taylor
Assistant	Mikey Devlin
1st Team Coach	Stevie Walker
Goalkeeping Coach	Alex Clark

== Season-by-season record ==
=== Lowland League ===
Season	Div.	Pos.	Pld.	W	D	L	Pts.	Scottish Cup
Dalbeattie Star
2013–14	Lowland League	3rd	22	11	7	4	40	2nd Round, losing to Montrose
2014–15	Lowland League	4th	26	11	9	6	42	2nd Round, losing to Linlithgow Rose
2015–16	Lowland League	9th	28	10	6	12	36	1st Round, losing to Fraserburgh
2016–17	Lowland League	5th	30	14	5	11	47	1st Round, losing to Wick Academy
2017–18	Lowland League	14th	30	7	8	15	29	1st Round, losing to BSC Glasgow
2018–19	Lowland League	14th	28	5	7	16	22	1st Round Replay, losing to Kelty Hearts
2019–20	Lowland League	15th†	23	3	2	18	11	1st Round, losing to Gala Fairydean Rovers
2020–21	Lowland League	15th†	10	1	2	7	5	Preliminary Round Two, losing to Huntly
2021–22	Lowland League	12th	34	14	1	19	43	3rd Round, losing to East Kilbride
2022–23	Lowland League	19th	36	1	5	30	8	2nd Round, losing to Darvel

† Season curtailed due to coronavirus pandemic.

=== South of Scotland Football League ===
Season	Div.	Pos.	Pld.	W	D	L	GF	GA	GD	Pts.	Scottish Cup
Dalbeattie Star
2023-24	South of Scotland Football League	1st	22	17	3	2	92	22	+70	54	1st Round, losing to Banks O' Dee
2024-25	South of Scotland Football League	3rd	22	14	4	4	90	42	+48	46	Preliminary Round Two, losing to Whitehill Welfare F.C.

== Honours ==
- South of Scotland League
  - Winners (12): 1924–25, 1929–30, 1930–31, 1931–32, 1932–33, 1933–34, 1984–85, 1985–86, 1988–89, 2011–12, 2012–13, 2023–24
- Southern Counties Cup
  - Winners (12): 1906–07, 1908–09, 1924–25, 1930–31, 1933–34, 1992–93, 2006–07, 2008–09, 2011–12, 2012–13, 2016–17, 2017–18, 2021–22
- South of Scotland League Cup
  - Winners 1988–89, 1992–93, 2010–11, 2011–12, 2012–13
- East of Scotland League Cup
  - Winners: 2008–09
- Potts Cup
  - Winners 1924–25, 1932–33, 1982–83, 1985–86, 1991–92, 1992–93, 1998–99, 1999–00, 2011–12
- J Haig Gordon Memorial Trophy
  - Winners 1977–78, 1983–84, 1988–89, 2011–12
- Cree Lodge Cup
  - Winners 1980–81, 1984–85
- Tweedie Cup
  - Winners 1999–00, 2012–13
- James Brown Fair Play Trophy
  - Winners 1987–88, 1989–90, 1990–91, 1991–92, 2004–05, 2006–07, 2007–08, 2011–12
- Detroit Trophy (Overall)
  - Winners 1983–84 (share with Annan), 1984–85, 1988–89, 1991–92, 1992–93, 2011–12, 2012–13
- South of Scotland Cup
  - Winners 1929–30, 1930–31
- Dumfries & Galloway Cup
  - Winners 1911–12, 1927–28, 1928–29, 1930–31
