= Wigtown & Bladnoch F.C. =

Association football club in Scotland

Wigtown & Bladnoch
- Full name: Wigtown & Bladnoch Football Club
- Founded: 1880 as Wigtown FC
- Ground: Trammondford Park, Wigtown
- Capacity: 1,500
- Coordinates: 54°51′57″N 4°27′15″W
- Chairman: Jim McColm
- Manager: Kevin McKnight
- League: South of Scotland League
- 2025–26: South of Scotland League, 10th of 11
- Website: https://www.pitchero.com/clubs/wigtownandbladnochfc
Home colours	Away colours

Wigtown & Bladnoch Football Club are a football club from the town of Wigtown in the Dumfries and Galloway area of Scotland, who play in the South of Scotland Football League, in the sixth tier of Scottish football.

The club finished third in the South of Scotland Football League in 2015–16, having previously won their fourth and fifth titles in the 2013–14 and 2014–15 seasons.

In November 2026, Opta Sports ranked them 14,554th of 14,555 teams worldwide with a rating of 3.1, the second weakest football team worldwide, only stronger than Puaikura.

== History ==
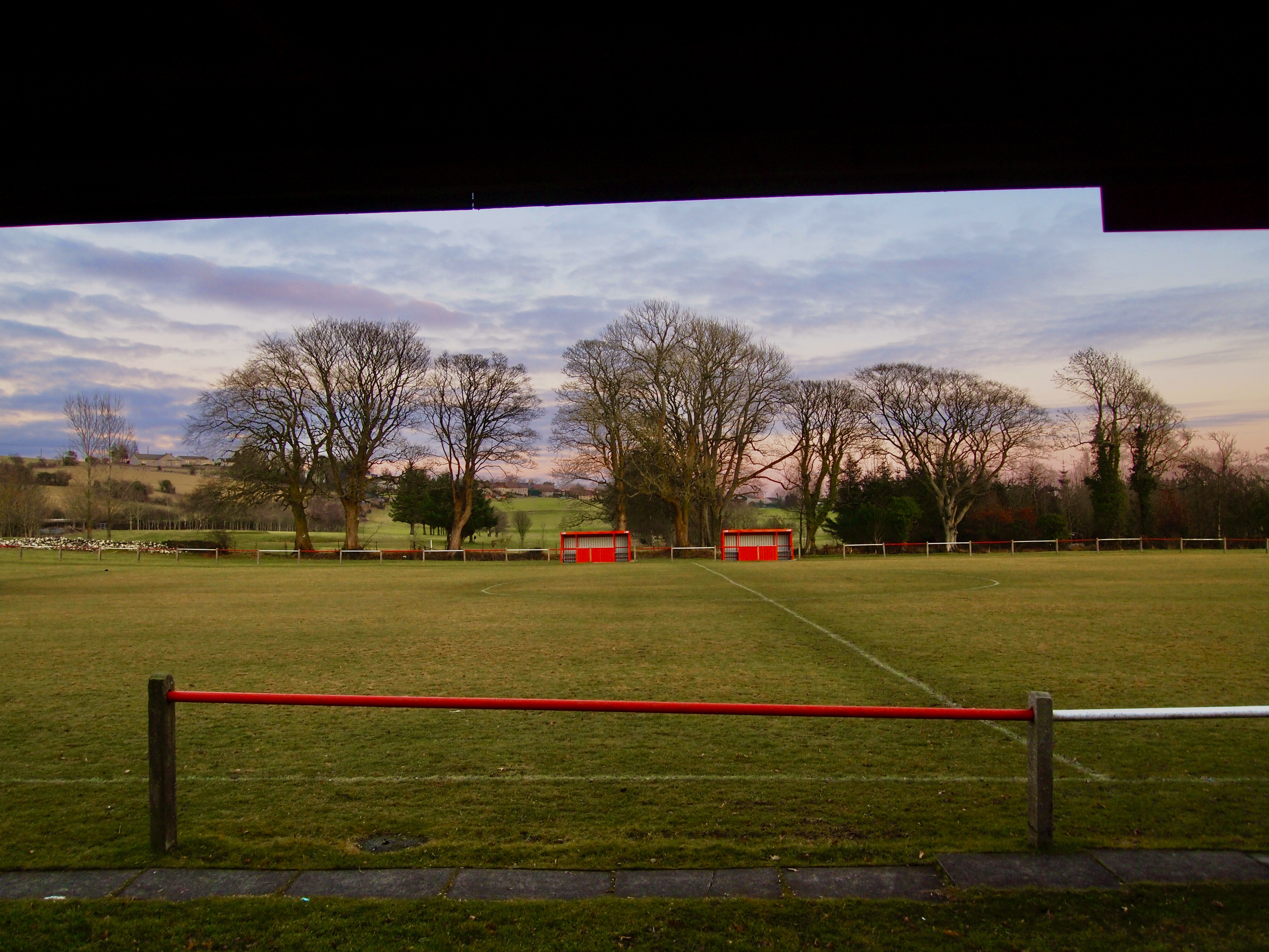
Trammondford Park, Wigtown & Bladnoch F.C.

They were originally formed in 1880 as Wigtown F.C., but changed their name to Wigtown & Bladnoch F.C. in 1919. Bladnoch is a small village barely a mile from Wigtown, but was the base for two of the largest employers in the area. Bladnoch Distillery was founded in 1817 by the McLelland brothers as the southernmost distillery in Scotland, and Bladnoch Creamery, founded in 1899 by the Scottish Co-operative Wholesale Society.

They play their home matches at Trammondford Park, which has room for 1,500 spectators. The club motto is "moving forward – to achieve our goals".

They have competed in the South of Scotland Football League since the league reformed in 1946, although they resigned for seasons 1962–63 and 1972–73 due to financial problems. They have won the league on four occasions, the latest being 2013–14 when they prevailed in the first championship after Threave Rovers and Dalbeattie Star left the South of Scotland League to join the newly formed Lowland Football League and only failed to win two of their 20 league games that season.

Wigtown & Bladnoch have also appeared in the Scottish Cup on 14 occasions but their only moment of glory was in January 1952 when they defeated Scottish Football League club Montrose 2–1 at Links Park, Montrose. The club played Dundee at home in the second round and were defeated 7–1, although Dundee did go on to play Motherwell in the final that season.

== Honours ==
=== League ===
- South of Scotland Football League
  - Winners (5): 1951–52, 1953–54, 1991–92, 2013–14, 2014–15

=== Cup ===
- Cafolla Cup Winners
  - Winners (4): 1924–25, 1932–33, 1935–36, 1958–59
- Challenge Cup Winners
  - Winners (1): 2013–14
- Cree Lodge Cup Winners
  - Winners (3): 1932–33, 1934–35, 1946–47
- Ian Boyd Memorial Cup Winners
  - Winners (4): 2012, 2013, 2014, 2015
- J. Haig Gordon Cup Winners
  - Winners (4): 1990–91, 2012–13, 2013–14, 2016–17
- Potts Cup Winners
  - Winners (8): 1931–32, 1938–39, 1947–48, 1950–51, 1989–90, 2006–07, 2008–09, 2012–13
- Scottish Qualifying Cup Winners
  - Winners (1): 1951–52
- South of Scotland Football League Cup Winners
  - Winners (6): 1951–52, 1952–53, 1983–84, 1986–87, 1994–95, 2013–14
- Tweedie Cup Winners
  - Winners (2): 1958–59, 2013–14
- Wigtownshire Cup Winners
  - Winners (5): 1924–25, 1930–31, 1932–33, 1933–34, 1948–49
- Wigtownshire & District Cup Winners
  - Winners (2): 1930–31, 1933–34
