= Newton Stewart F.C. =

Newton Stewart
- Full name: Newton Stewart Football Club
- Nickname: The Creesiders
- Founded: 1880
- Ground: Blairmount Park, Newton Stewart
- Capacity: 1,500
- Coordinates: 54.9570°N 4.4971°W
- Manager: Jamie Adams
- League: Lowland League West
- 2025–26: South of Scotland League, 4th of 11 (promoted)
Home colours	Away colours

Newton Stewart Football Club are a football club from the town of Newton Stewart in the Dumfries and Galloway area of Scotland.

== History ==
The club was formed in 1880, as Newton Stewart Athletic. In 1891 the club merged with the Newton Stewart Clerks club, and briefly took on the Newton Stewart name; after reverting to Athletic, the club settled on Newton Stewart Football Club in 1902. They are nicknamed the Creesiders, because the town stands on the banks of the River Cree.

They compete in the South of Scotland Football League, which they have won on three occasions and finished 2nd in the 2014–15 season.

Home matches are played at Blairmount Park, which holds around 1,500 spectators. There was a stand at the ground at one stage, but this was demolished due to being unsafe, leaving Blairmount Park a fairly open and undeveloped football venue which has recently been converted into an all-weather 4G surface.

Newton Stewart won their first trophy for 13 years in 2014–15 after defeating local rivals Wigtown & Bladnoch 2–1 in the J. Haig Gordon Cup Final. They then followed that by beating Mid-Annandale 4–0 in the final of the Potts Cup to claim their second trophy of the season. The club ended the season with a cup double which has been their most successful season for many years. The Club captured the South of Scotland League Cup in 2016–17 after a penalty shoot out win in the Final against Threave Rovers at St Marys Park, Kircudbright.

As a full member of the Scottish Football Association, the club can play in the Scottish Cup. It has done so intermittently since the 1883–84 Scottish Cup, but only won two ties in the main rounds, in 1888 and 2013 - albeit the former was a 13–0 win over Nithsdale.

== Colours ==
The club's original colours were blue and red hoops with white knickers. After merging with the Clerks, the club adopted the latter's shirt design of half-inch chocolate and grey stripes with white knickers. In 1896 the club changed to a more simple navy blue; but in 1899, it adopted claret and amber. The club has worn black and white since at least the 1960s.

== Ground ==
The club originally played at Kirroughtree Park, a mile from the station. In 1893 it moved to Holm Park.

== Honours ==
=== League ===
- South of Scotland Football League:
  - Winners (3) : 1950–51, 1955–56, 1987–88

=== Cup ===
- Southern Counties Challenge Cup: 1948–49, 1950–51, 1955–56, 1962–63, 1983–84, 2025-26
- Cree Lodge Cup: 1921–22, 1923–24, 1928–29, 1929–30, 1948–49, 1961–62, 1963–64
- J. Haig Gordon Cup: 2014–15, 2024–25, 2025-26
- Potts Cup: 1951–52, 1952–53, 1961–62, 1987–88, 2014–15
- Tweedie Cup: 1905–06, 1906–07, 1926–27, 1991–92, 2021–22
- South of Scotland League Cup: 1950–51, 1958–59, 1985–86, 2000–01, 2016–17
- Wigtownshire & District Cup: 1905–06, 1919–20, 1924–25, 1925–26, 1929–30, 1961–62
- Wigtownshire Cup: 1902–03, 1903–04, 1908–09, 1911–12, 1913–14, 1921–22, 1925–26, 1950–51, 1967–68
- Wigtownshire & Kirkcudbrightshire Cup: 1948–49, 1950–51
- South Supplementary Cup: 1955–56
- South of Scotland Cup: 1923–24, 1924–25
- Candida Casa Cup: 1910–11, 1912–13
- Dumfries & Galloway Cup: 1906–07
