= St Cuthbert Wanderers F.C. =

Association football club in Scotland

St Cuthbert Wanderers
- Full name: Saint Cuthbert Wanderers Football Club
- Nickname: The Saints
- Founded: 1879 (Reformed 1890)
- Ground: St Mary's Park, Kirkcudbright
- Capacity: 848
- Coordinates: 54°50′0″N 4°3′39″W
- Chairman: Ian McIntyre
- Manager: Craig Rudd
- League: South of Scotland League
- 2025–26: South of Scotland League, 11th of 11
Home colours	Away colours

Saint Cuthbert Wanderers Football Club are a football club from the town of Kirkcudbright in the Stewartry in Galloway, Scotland. They play in the South of Scotland Football League.

== History ==
They are named after St Cuthbert of Lindisfarne, who is the patron saint of the town of Kirkcudbright.

St Cuthbert Wanderers are one of the oldest clubs in the South of Scotland League. The club was formed in 1879 by several members of the congregation of St Cuthbert's Catholic Church in the High Street (which became the present St Andrew's and St Cuthbert's Church).

Prior to going to Mass one Sunday morning in 1879, around seven or eight male members of the congregation talked about forming a football club. Some of the men involved in these discussions were Tom Branney, James Crossan, Michael Crossan, William Flannigan, George Murphy and William Murray. The first meeting took place in St Cuthbert's School shelter, when each gentleman vowed to save three pounds and return in a month's time to get a club going. The total amount involved to get the club up and running came to £50, which included several donations from well wishers. After a few fund-raising dances in the church's St Andrew's Hall, the final meeting to gather a team was called. Office Bearers were elected, with chairman Robert McMonies, secretary George Murphy and treasurer William Flannigan. After a few trial games it was decided that the club would be called 'St Cuthbert Wanderers'. The club was broke up in 1886 but was re-formed on 13 October 1890. The club was later admitted to the Southern Counties League, following several friendly games with local amateur clubs.

As a full member of the Scottish Football Association, the club can compete in the Scottish Cup.

== Stadium ==
The Saints (as the club is nicknamed) play their home matches at St Mary's Park, which has an official capacity of 848.

== Honours ==
=== League ===
- South of Scotland Football League
  - Winners (13) : 1927–28, 1928–29, 1934–35, 1935–36, 1936–37, 1954–55, 1956–57, 1958–59, 1970–71, 1973–74, 1980–81, 1995–96, 2015–16, 2021–22

=== Cup ===
- South Qualifying Cup: 1971–72
- Southern Counties Challenge Cup: 1895–96, 1929–30, 1952–53, 1953–54, 1958-59, 1969–70
- Cree Lodge Cup: 1938–39, 1971–72, 1986–87, 1988–89
- Haig Gordon Memorial Trophy: 1969–70, 1972–73, 1997–98, 2015-16, 2021–22
- Potts Cup: 1910–11, 1914–15, 1929–30, 1935–36, 1936–37, 1954–55, 1955–56, 1956–57, 1969–70, 1971–72, 1974–75, 1984–85, 1986–87, 1988–89, 1996–97
- Tweedie Cup: 1935–36, 1936–37, 1948–49, 1954–55, 1963–64 (shared), 1973–74, 1989–90, 2001–02
- South of Scotland League Cup: 1953–54, 1969–70, 1970–71, 1972–73, (1974–75), 1981–82, 1995–96, 2007–08
- Wigtownshire & District Cup: 1911–12, 1926–27, 1928–29, 1934–35, 1937–38, 1947–48, 1949–50, 1958–59, 1969–70
- Wigtownshire Cup: 1936–37, 1945–46
- Wigtownshire & Kirkcudbrightshire Cup: 1925–26, 1926–27, 1928–29, 1938–39, 1953–54
- South of Scotland Cup: 1925–26, 1926–27
- Dumfries & Galloway Cup: 1908–09, 1924–25, 1925–26, 1926–27, 1929–30
- Law–Galloway Cup: 1893–94, 1894–95, 1903–04
- St Cuthbert's Cup: 1893–94
