= 2023–24 Celtic F.C. season =

Celtic F.C.
2023–24 season
- Chairman: Peter Lawwell
- Manager: Brendan Rodgers
- Stadium: Celtic Park
- Premiership: 1st
- Scottish Cup: Winners
- League Cup: Second round
- Champions League: Group stage
- Top goalscorer: League: Matt O'Riley (18 goals); All: Kyogo Furuhashi; Matt O'Riley (19 goals)
| Home colours | Away colours | Third colours |

The 2023–24 season was Celtic's 130th season of competitive football.

== Pre-season and friendlies ==
Celtic held a pre-season training camp in Portugal before travelling to Japan, where they played friendlies against Yokohama F. Marinos and Gamba Osaka. On their return from Japan, they faced Wolverhampton Wanderers in Dublin. Their pre-season schedule concluded with James Forrest's testimonial match, in which Athletic Bilbao visited Celtic Park.

| 19 July 2023 Friendly | Yokohama F. Marinos | 6–4 | Celtic | Yokohama, Japan |
| 19:00 JST | Anderson Lopes 5', 59'; Mizunuma 23'; Saneto 66'; Miyaichi 85', 88' | Report | Maeda 6', 21', 42'; Turnbull 90+2' | Stadium: Nissan Stadium |

| 22 July 2023 Friendly | Gamba Osaka | 0–1 | Celtic | Suita, Japan |
| 19:00 JST | | Report | Bernabei 85' | Stadium: Suita City Football Stadium |

| 29 July 2023 Friendly | Celtic | 1–1 | Wolverhampton Wanderers | Dublin, Ireland |
| 14:00 IST | Furuhashi 6' | Report | Cunha 85' (pen.) | Stadium: Aviva Stadium |

| 1 August 2023 Friendly | Celtic | 3–2 | Athletic Bilbao | Glasgow |
| 19:30 BST | Hatate 37'; Bernabei 66'; Turnbull 69' | Report | Gómez 2'; Muniain 37' | Stadium: Celtic Park |

== Scottish Premiership ==
The Premiership fixture list was announced on 30 June 2023. Celtic began their title defence against Ross County at Celtic Park.

| 5 August 2023 | Celtic | 4–2 | Ross County | Glasgow |
| 12:30 BST | Turnbull 17' (pen.), 42'; Furuhashi 26'; O'Riley 73' | Report | White 60'; Brown 90+5' | Stadium: Celtic Park; Attendance: 58,772; Referee: Nick Walsh |

| 13 August 2023 | Aberdeen | 1–3 | Celtic | Aberdeen |
| 12:00 BST | Miovski 25' | Report | Abada 11'; Furuhashi 29'; O'Riley 84' | Stadium: Pittodrie Stadium; Attendance: 18,652; Referee: Kevin Clancy |

| 26 August 2023 | Celtic | 0–0 | St Johnstone | Glasgow |
| 15:00 BST | | Report | | Stadium: Celtic Park; Attendance: 58,600; Referee: Matthew MacDermid |

| 3 September 2023 | Rangers | 0–1 | Celtic | Glasgow |
| 12:00 BST | | Report | Furuhashi 45+2' | Stadium: Ibrox Stadium; Attendance: 50,652; Referee: Don Robertson |

| 16 September 2023 | Celtic | 3–0 | Dundee | Glasgow |
| 15:00 BST | Turnbull 51' (pen.); Furuhashi 63'; O'Riley 67' | Report | | Stadium: Celtic Park; Attendance: 58,928; Referee: Grant Irvine |

| 23 September 2023 | Livingston | 0–3 | Celtic | Livingston |
| 12:30 BST | | Report | Hatate 14' (pen.); O'Riley 48'; Maeda 90+5' | Stadium: Almondvale Stadium; Attendance: 8,118; Referee: John Beaton |

| 30 September 2023 | Motherwell | 1–2 | Celtic | Motherwell |
| 12:30 BST | Spittal 90+5' | Report | Palma 87'; O'Riley 90+7' | Stadium: Fir Park; Attendance: 8,778; Referee: Willie Collum |

| 7 October 2023 | Celtic | 3–1 | Kilmarnock | Glasgow |
| 15:00 BST | Hatate 22'; Palma 33'; Taylor 82' | Report | Watson 72' | Stadium: Celtic Park; Attendance: 58,295; Referee: Matthew MacDermid |

| 22 October 2023 | Heart of Midlothian | 1–4 | Celtic | Edinburgh |
| 14:15 BST | Shankland 64' | Report | O'Riley 4'; Maeda 23'; Furuhashi 51'; Iwata 81' | Stadium: Tynecastle Park; Attendance: 17,608; Referee: Nick Walsh |

| 28 October 2023 | Hibernian | 0–0 | Celtic | Edinburgh |
| 15:00 BST | | Report | | Stadium: Easter Road; Attendance: 18,548; Referee: Alan Muir |

| 1 November 2023 | Celtic | 2–1 | St Mirren | Glasgow |
| 19:45 GMT | Turnbull 18'; Oh 83' | Report | McMenamin 7' | Stadium: Celtic Park; Attendance: 58,168; Referee: John Beaton |

| 4 November 2023 | Ross County | 0–3 | Celtic | Dingwall |
| 12:30 GMT | | Report | Turnbull 45+7'; Palma 78'; Forrest 83' | Stadium: Victoria Park; Attendance: 6,544; Referee: David Munro |

| 12 November 2023 | Celtic | 6–0 | Aberdeen | Glasgow |
| 14:30 GMT | Yang 9'; Furuhashi 16'; Palma 77' (pen.); Turnbull 90+2'; Oh 90+6', 90+9' | Report | | Stadium: Celtic Park; Attendance: 58,885; Referee: Willie Collum |

| 25 November 2023 | Celtic | 1–1 | Motherwell | Glasgow |
| 15:00 GMT | Turnbull 86' (pen.) | Report | Obika 90' | Stadium: Celtic Park; Attendance: 58,140; Referee: Steven McLean |

| 3 December 2023 | St Johnstone | 1–3 | Celtic | Perth |
| 12:00 GMT | Jaiyesimi 40' | Report | McGregor 67'; O'Riley 79'; Forrest 90+3' | Stadium: McDiarmid Park; Attendance: 6,777; Referee: Don Robertson |

| 6 December 2023 | Celtic | 4–1 | Hibernian | Glasgow |
| 19:45 GMT | Oh 5', 55'; O'Riley 36'; Palma 51' (pen.) | Report | Doidge 72' | Stadium: Celtic Park; Attendance: 58,892; Referee: John Beaton |

| 10 December 2023 | Kilmarnock | 2–1 | Celtic | Kilmarnock |
| 12:00 GMT | Phillips 75' (o.g.); Kennedy 87' | Report | O'Riley 33' | Stadium: Rugby Park; Attendance: 7,706; Referee: David Munro |

| 16 December 2023 | Celtic | 0–2 | Heart of Midlothian | Glasgow |
| 15:00 GMT | | Report | Shankland 15'; Kingsley 30' | Stadium: Celtic Park; Attendance: 58,816; Referee: Kevin Clancy |

| 23 December 2023 | Celtic | 2–0 | Livingston | Glasgow |
| 15:00 GMT | Furuhashi 46'; Scales 51' | Report | | Stadium: Celtic Park; Attendance: 58,703; Referee: Matthew MacDermid |

| 26 December 2023 | Dundee | 0–3 | Celtic | Dundee |
| 15:00 GMT | | Report | Bernardo 52'; Johnston 83', 90+1' | Stadium: Dens Park; Attendance: 9,144; Referee: Don Robertson |

| 30 December 2023 | Celtic | 2–1 | Rangers | Glasgow |
| 12:30 GMT | Bernardo 25'; Furuhashi 47' | Report | Tavernier 88' | Stadium: Celtic Park; Attendance: 59,664; Referee: Nick Walsh |

| 2 January 2024 | St Mirren | 0–3 | Celtic | Paisley |
| 17:00 GMT | | Report | Maeda 1'; O'Riley 6'; Taylor 60' | Stadium: St Mirren Park; Attendance: 6,943; Referee: David Munro |

| 27 January 2024 | Celtic | 1–0 | Ross County | Glasgow |
| 15:00 GMT | Johnston 1' | Report | | Stadium: Celtic Park; Attendance: 58,850; Referee: Euan Anderson |

| 3 February 2024 | Aberdeen | 1–1 | Celtic | Aberdeen |
| 12:30 GMT | Miovski 50' | Report | Kühn 63' | Stadium: Pittodrie Stadium; Attendance: 17,002; Referee: Steven McLean |

| 7 February 2024 | Hibernian | 1–2 | Celtic | Edinburgh |
| 20:00 GMT | Levitt 60' | Report | Idah 10' (pen.), 90+2' (pen.) | Stadium: Easter Road; Attendance: 18,303; Referee: Nick Walsh |

| 17 February 2024 | Celtic | 1–1 | Kilmarnock | Glasgow |
| 15:00 GMT | Furuhashi 32' | Report | Watson 90+2' | Stadium: Celtic Park; Attendance: 58,887; Referee: John Beaton |

| 25 February 2024 | Motherwell | 1–3 | Celtic | Motherwell |
| 12:00 GMT | Spittal 43' | Report | Idah 51', 90+4'; Palma 90+6' | Stadium: Fir Park; Attendance: 8,639; Referee: Willie Collum |

| 28 February 2024 | Celtic | 7–1 | Dundee | Glasgow |
| 19:45 GMT | Carter-Vickers 7'; Idah 18'; O'Riley 22'; Maeda 30'; Taylor 36'; McGregor 45+7'; Kelly 63' | Report | Mellon 84' | Stadium: Celtic Park; Attendance: 58,772; Referee: Matthew MacDermid |

| 3 March 2024 | Heart of Midlothian | 2–0 | Celtic | Edinburgh |
| 12:00 GMT | Grant 43' (pen.); Shankland 56' | Report | | Stadium: Tynecastle Park; Attendance: 17,748; Referee: Don Robertson |

| 16 March 2024 | Celtic | 3–1 | St Johnstone | Glasgow |
| 15:00 GMT | Furuhashi 40'; Kühn 46'; Forrest 68' | Report | Smith 81' | Stadium: Celtic Park; Attendance: 58,880; Referee: Euan Anderson |

| 31 March 2024 | Livingston | 0–3 | Celtic | Livingston |
| 12:00 BST | | Report | Brandon 49' (o.g.); Bernardo 72'; O'Riley 82' | Stadium: Almondvale Stadium; Attendance: 8,396; Referee: Don Robertson |

| 7 April 2024 | Rangers | 3–3 | Celtic | Glasgow |
| 12:00 BST | Tavernier 55' (pen.); Sima 86'; Matondo 90+3' | Report | Maeda 1'; O'Riley 34' (pen.); Idah 87' | Stadium: Ibrox Stadium; Attendance: 50,936; Referee: John Beaton |

| 13 April 2024 | Celtic | 3–0 | St Mirren | Glasgow |
| 15:00 BST | Hatate 52'; Furuhashi 60'; Idah 86' | Report | | Stadium: Celtic Park; Attendance: 58,888; Referee: Steven McLean |

| 28 April 2024 | Dundee | 1–2 | Celtic | Dundee |
| 15:00 BST | Portales 74' | Report | Forrest 30', 67' | Stadium: Dens Park; Attendance: 9,120; Referee: John Beaton |

| 4 May 2024 | Celtic | 3–0 | Heart of Midlothian | Glasgow |
| 15:00 BST | Furuhashi 4', 21'; O'Riley 87' (pen.) | Report | | Stadium: Celtic Park; Attendance: 59,038; Referee: Kevin Clancy |

| 11 May 2024 | Celtic | 2–1 | Rangers | Glasgow |
| 12:30 BST | O'Riley 35'; Lundstram 38' (o.g.) | Report | Dessers 40' | Stadium: Celtic Park; Attendance: 59,622; Referee: Willie Collum |

| 15 May 2024 | Kilmarnock | 0–5 | Celtic | Kilmarnock |
| 19:30 BST | | Report | Idah 5'; Maeda 12'; Forrest 35'; O'Riley 51', 71' | Stadium: Rugby Park; Attendance: 9,595; Referee: Don Robertson |

| 18 May 2024 | Celtic | 3–2 | St Mirren | Glasgow |
| 12:30 BST | O'Riley 21'; Furuhashi 37'; Palma 86' | Report | O'Hara 7', 26' (pen.) | Stadium: Celtic Park; Attendance: 58,912; Referee: Matthew MacDermid |

== Scottish Cup ==
On 26 November, Celtic were drawn to face Buckie Thistle at Celtic Park in the fourth round of the 2023–24 Scottish Cup. On 21 January 2024, Celtic were drawn to face St Mirren at St Mirren Park in the fifth round. On 11 February, Celtic were drawn to face Livingston at Celtic Park in the quarter-finals. On 11 March, Celtic were drawn to face Aberdeen in the semi-finals. Celtic faced Rangers in the final on 25 May.

| 21 January 2024 Fourth round | Celtic | 5–0 | Buckie Thistle | Glasgow |
| 16:00 GMT | Bernardo 25'; Holm 33'; Furuhashi 41'; Palma 50'; Vata 76' | Report | | Stadium: Celtic Park; Attendance: 40,180; Referee: Chris Graham |

| 11 February 2024 Fifth round | St Mirren | 0–2 | Celtic | Paisley |
| 14:00 GMT | | Report | Furuhashi 15'; Maeda 53' | Stadium: St Mirren Park; Attendance: 4,400; Referee: David Dickinson |

| 10 March 2024 Quarter-finals | Celtic | 4–2 | Livingston | Glasgow |
| 14:30 GMT | Maeda 7', 22', 86'; Furuhashi 90+5' | Report | MacKay 12'; Yengi 54' | Stadium: Celtic Park; Attendance: 33,232; Referee: Willie Collum |

| 20 April 2024 Semi-finals | Aberdeen | 3–3 (a.e.t.) (5–6 p) | Celtic | Glasgow |
| 12:30 BST | Miovski 2'; Sokler 90'; MacDonald 119' | Report | Kühn 21'; Forrest 63'; O'Riley 105+1' | Stadium: Hampden Park; Attendance: 45,385; Referee: Don Robertson |
| | Penalties |
| | McGrath (penalty scored); MacDonald (penalty scored); Sokler (penalty scored); Duncan (penalty missed); Hoilett (penalty scored); Milne (penalty scored); Phillips (penalty missed) | | (penalty scored) Idah; (penalty scored) Palma; (penalty scored) O'Riley; (penalty scored) Bernardo; (penalty missed) Hart; (penalty scored) Johnston; (penalty scored) Iwata |

| 25 May 2024 Final | Celtic | 1–0 | Rangers | Glasgow |
| 15:00 BST | Idah 90' | Report | | Stadium: Hampden Park; Attendance: 48,556; Referee: Nick Walsh |

== Scottish League Cup ==
On 30 July, Celtic were drawn to face Kilmarnock in the second round of the 2023–24 Scottish League Cup.

| 20 August 2023 Second round | Kilmarnock | 1–0 | Celtic | Kilmarnock |
| 15:00 BST | Watkins 59' | Report | | Stadium: Rugby Park; Attendance: 8,002; Referee: Alan Muir |

== UEFA Champions League ==
Celtic entered the UEFA Champions League at the group stage.

=== Group stage ===
On 31 August, the draw for the group stage was made. Celtic were drawn in Group E along with Feyenoord, Atlético Madrid and Lazio.

| Pos | Team | Pld | W | D | L | GF | GA | GD | Pts | Qualification | ATM | LAZ | FEY | CEL |
|---|---|---|---|---|---|---|---|---|---|---|---|---|---|---|
| 1 | (Spain) Atlético Madrid | 6 | 4 | 2 | 0 | 17 | 6 | +11 | 14 | Advance to knockout phase | — | 2–0 | 3–2 | 6–0 |
| 2 | (Italy) Lazio | 6 | 3 | 1 | 2 | 7 | 7 | 0 | 10 | Advance to knockout phase | 1–1 | — | 1–0 | 2–0 |
| 3 | (Netherlands) Feyenoord | 6 | 2 | 0 | 4 | 9 | 10 | −1 | 6 | Transfer to Europa League | 1–3 | 3–1 | — | 2–0 |
| 4 | (Scotland) Celtic | 6 | 1 | 1 | 4 | 5 | 15 | −10 | 4 | | 2–2 | 1–2 | 2–1 | — |

Source: UEFA
Rules for classification: Group stage tiebreakers

==== Matches ====
| 19 September 2023 Matchday 1 | Feyenoord (Netherlands) | 2–0 | (Scotland) Celtic | Rotterdam, Netherlands |
| 21:00 CEST | Stengs 45+2'; Jahanbakhsh 76' | Report | | Stadium: De Kuip; Attendance: 44,008; Referee: Irfan Peljto (Bosnia and Herzegovina) |

| 4 October 2023 Matchday 2 | Celtic (Scotland) | 1–2 | (Italy) Lazio | Glasgow |
| 20:00 BST | Furuhashi 12' | Report | Vecino 29'; Pedro 90+5' | Stadium: Celtic Park; Attendance: 56,063; Referee: Donatas Rumšas (Lithuania) |

| 25 October 2023 Matchday 3 | Celtic (Scotland) | 2–2 | (Spain) Atlético Madrid | Glasgow |
| 20:00 BST | Furuhashi 4'; Palma 28' | Report | Griezmann 25'; Morata 53' | Stadium: Celtic Park; Attendance: 55,844; Referee: Felix Zwayer (Germany) |

| 7 November 2023 Matchday 4 | Atlético Madrid (Spain) | 6–0 | (Scotland) Celtic | Madrid, Spain |
| 21:00 CET | Griezmann 6', 60'; Morata 45+2', 76'; Lino 66'; Saúl 84' | Report | | Stadium: Metropolitano Stadium; Attendance: 60,863; Referee: Ivan Kružliak (Slovakia) |

| 28 November 2023 Matchday 5 | Lazio (Italy) | 2–0 | (Scotland) Celtic | Rome, Italy |
| 18:45 CET | Immobile 82', 85' | Report | | Stadium: Stadio Olimpico; Attendance: 50,555; Referee: Halil Umut Meler (Turkey) |

| 13 December 2023 Matchday 6 | Celtic (Scotland) | 2–1 | (Netherlands) Feyenoord | Glasgow |
| 20:00 GMT | Palma 33' (pen.); Lagerbielke 90+1' | Report | Minteh 82' | Stadium: Celtic Park; Attendance: 56,391; Referee: Benoît Bastien (France) |

== Statistics ==
=== Appearances and goals ===
| No. | Pos | Nat | Player | Total | | Premiership | | Scottish Cup | | League Cup | | Champions League | |
| No. | Pos | Nat | Player | Apps | Goals | Apps | Goals | Apps | Goals | Apps | Goals | Apps | Goals |
Goalkeepers
| 1 | GK | (England) ENG | Joe Hart | 49 | 0 | 37 | 0 | 5 | 0 | 1 | 0 | 6 | 0 |
| 29 | GK | (Scotland) SCO | Scott Bain | 3 | 0 | 3 | 0 | 0 | 0 | 0 | 0 | 0 | 0 |
| 31 | GK | (Switzerland) SUI | Benjamin Siegrist | 0 | 0 | 0 | 0 | 0 | 0 | 0 | 0 | 0 | 0 |
Defenders
| 2 | DF | (Canada) CAN | Alistair Johnston | 42 | 1 | 32 | 1 | 4 | 0 | 0 | 0 | 6 | 0 |
| 3 | DF | (Scotland) SCO | Greg Taylor | 46 | 3 | 35 | 3 | 4 | 0 | 1 | 0 | 6 | 0 |
| 4 | DF | (Sweden) SWE | Gustaf Lagerbielke | 10 | 1 | 7 | 0 | 0 | 0 | 1 | 0 | 2 | 1 |
| 5 | DF | (Republic of Ireland) IRL | Liam Scales | 45 | 1 | 34 | 1 | 5 | 0 | 0 | 0 | 6 | 0 |
| 17 | DF | (Poland) POL | Maik Nawrocki | 13 | 0 | 10 | 0 | 2 | 0 | 1 | 0 | 0 | 0 |
| 18 | DF | (Japan) JPN | Yuki Kobayashi | 0 | 0 | 0 | 0 | 0 | 0 | 0 | 0 | 0 | 0 |
| 20 | DF | (United States) USA | Cameron Carter-Vickers | 31 | 1 | 25 | 1 | 2 | 0 | 0 | 0 | 4 | 0 |
| 56 | DF | (Scotland) SCO | Anthony Ralston | 18 | 0 | 15 | 0 | 2 | 0 | 1 | 0 | 0 | 0 |
| 57 | DF | (Scotland) SCO | Stephen Welsh | 14 | 0 | 10 | 0 | 3 | 0 | 0 | 0 | 1 | 0 |
| 68 | DF | (Scotland) SCO | Mitchel Frame | 1 | 0 | 0 | 0 | 0 | 0 | 0 | 0 | 1 | 0 |
Midfielders
| 15 | MF | (Norway) NOR | Odin Thiago Holm | 13 | 1 | 9 | 0 | 1 | 1 | 1 | 0 | 2 | 0 |
| 16 | MF | (Republic of Ireland) IRL | James McCarthy | 0 | 0 | 0 | 0 | 0 | 0 | 0 | 0 | 0 | 0 |
| 24 | MF | (Japan) JPN | Tomoki Iwata | 24 | 1 | 19 | 1 | 2 | 0 | 0 | 0 | 3 | 0 |
| 28 | MF | (Portugal) POR | Paulo Bernardo | 33 | 4 | 22 | 3 | 5 | 1 | 0 | 0 | 6 | 0 |
| 33 | MF | (Denmark) DEN | Matt O'Riley | 49 | 19 | 37 | 18 | 5 | 1 | 1 | 0 | 6 | 0 |
| 41 | MF | (Japan) JPN | Reo Hatate | 21 | 3 | 16 | 3 | 2 | 0 | 0 | 0 | 3 | 0 |
| 42 | MF | (Scotland) SCO | Callum McGregor (captain) | 45 | 2 | 35 | 2 | 3 | 0 | 1 | 0 | 6 | 0 |
| 48 | MF | (Scotland) SCO | Daniel Kelly | 6 | 1 | 4 | 1 | 2 | 0 | 0 | 0 | 0 | 0 |
| 49 | MF | (Scotland) SCO | James Forrest | 28 | 7 | 22 | 6 | 3 | 1 | 0 | 0 | 3 | 0 |
Forwards
| 7 | FW | (Honduras) HON | Luis Palma | 36 | 10 | 28 | 7 | 3 | 1 | 0 | 0 | 5 | 2 |
| 8 | FW | (Japan) JPN | Kyogo Furuhashi | 50 | 19 | 38 | 14 | 5 | 3 | 1 | 0 | 6 | 2 |
| 9 | FW | (Republic of Ireland) IRL | Adam Idah | 19 | 9 | 15 | 8 | 4 | 1 | 0 | 0 | 0 | 0 |
| 10 | FW | (Germany) GER | Nicolas Kühn | 18 | 3 | 14 | 2 | 4 | 1 | 0 | 0 | 0 | 0 |
| 13 | FW | (South Korea) KOR | Yang Hyun-jun | 31 | 1 | 24 | 1 | 2 | 0 | 1 | 0 | 4 | 0 |
| 19 | FW | (South Korea) KOR | Oh Hyeon-gyu | 26 | 5 | 20 | 5 | 1 | 0 | 0 | 0 | 5 | 0 |
| 38 | FW | (Japan) JPN | Daizen Maeda | 36 | 10 | 28 | 6 | 3 | 4 | 1 | 0 | 4 | 0 |
| 39 | FW | (Republic of Ireland) IRL | Rocco Vata | 2 | 1 | 1 | 0 | 1 | 1 | 0 | 0 | 0 | 0 |
Departures
| 4 | DF | (Sweden) SWE | Carl Starfelt | 1 | 0 | 1 | 0 | 0 | 0 | 0 | 0 | 0 | 0 |
| 6 | DF | (England) ENG | Nat Phillips | 8 | 0 | 6 | 0 | 0 | 0 | 0 | 0 | 2 | 0 |
| 9 | FW | (Montenegro) MNE | Sead Hakšabanović | 2 | 0 | 1 | 0 | 0 | 0 | 1 | 0 | 0 | 0 |
| 11 | FW | (Israel) ISR | Liel Abada | 11 | 1 | 9 | 1 | 1 | 0 | 1 | 0 | 0 | 0 |
| 14 | MF | (Scotland) SCO | David Turnbull | 19 | 7 | 16 | 7 | 0 | 0 | 1 | 0 | 2 | 0 |
| 22 | MF | (South Korea) KOR | Kwon Hyeok-kyu | 0 | 0 | 0 | 0 | 0 | 0 | 0 | 0 | 0 | 0 |
| 23 | FW | (Australia) AUS | Marco Tilio | 2 | 0 | 2 | 0 | 0 | 0 | 0 | 0 | 0 | 0 |
| 25 | DF | (Argentina) ARG | Alexandro Bernabei | 9 | 0 | 8 | 0 | 1 | 0 | 0 | 0 | 0 | 0 |
| 90 | FW | (Republic of Ireland) IRL | Mikey Johnston | 12 | 2 | 9 | 2 | 1 | 0 | 0 | 0 | 2 | 0 |

Last updated: 25 May 2024
Source: Competitions

Notes

1. Player's loan ended during the season
2. Player loaned out during the season
3. Player left the club during the season

=== Goalscorers ===
| R | No. | Pos. | Nation | Name | Premiership | Scottish Cup | League Cup | Champions League | Total |
|---|---|---|---|---|---|---|---|---|---|
| 1 | 8 | FW | (Japan) | Kyogo Furuhashi | 14 | 3 | 0 | 2 | 19 |
| 1 | 33 | MF | (Denmark) | Matt O'Riley | 18 | 1 | 0 | 0 | 19 |
| 3 | 7 | FW | (Honduras) | Luis Palma | 7 | 1 | 0 | 2 | 10 |
| 3 | 38 | FW | (Japan) | Daizen Maeda | 6 | 4 | 0 | 0 | 10 |
| 5 | 9 | FW | (Republic of Ireland) | Adam Idah | 8 | 1 | 0 | 0 | 9 |
| 6 | 14 | MF | (Scotland) | David Turnbull | 7 | 0 | 0 | 0 | 7 |
| 6 | 49 | MF | (Scotland) | James Forrest | 6 | 1 | 0 | 0 | 7 |
| 8 | 19 | FW | (South Korea) | Oh Hyeon-gyu | 5 | 0 | 0 | 0 | 5 |
| 9 | 28 | MF | (Portugal) | Paulo Bernardo | 3 | 1 | 0 | 0 | 4 |
| 10 | 3 | DF | (Scotland) | Greg Taylor | 3 | 0 | 0 | 0 | 3 |
| 10 | 10 | FW | (Germany) | Nicolas Kühn | 2 | 1 | 0 | 0 | 3 |
| 10 | 41 | MF | (Japan) | Reo Hatate | 3 | 0 | 0 | 0 | 3 |
| 13 | 42 | MF | (Scotland) | Callum McGregor | 2 | 0 | 0 | 0 | 2 |
| 13 | 90 | FW | (Republic of Ireland) | Mikey Johnston | 2 | 0 | 0 | 0 | 2 |
| 15 | 2 | DF | (Canada) | Alistair Johnston | 1 | 0 | 0 | 0 | 1 |
| 15 | 4 | DF | (Sweden) | Gustaf Lagerbielke | 0 | 0 | 0 | 1 | 1 |
| 15 | 5 | DF | (Republic of Ireland) | Liam Scales | 1 | 0 | 0 | 0 | 1 |
| 15 | 11 | FW | (Israel) | Liel Abada | 1 | 0 | 0 | 0 | 1 |
| 15 | 13 | FW | (South Korea) | Yang Hyun-jun | 1 | 0 | 0 | 0 | 1 |
| 15 | 15 | MF | (Norway) | Odin Thiago Holm | 0 | 1 | 0 | 0 | 1 |
| 15 | 20 | DF | (United States) | Cameron Carter-Vickers | 1 | 0 | 0 | 0 | 1 |
| 15 | 24 | MF | (Japan) | Tomoki Iwata | 1 | 0 | 0 | 0 | 1 |
| 15 | 39 | FW | (Republic of Ireland) | Rocco Vata | 0 | 1 | 0 | 0 | 1 |
| 15 | 48 | MF | (Scotland) | Daniel Kelly | 1 | 0 | 0 | 0 | 1 |
| Own goals | | | | | 2 | 0 | 0 | 0 | 2 |
| Total | | | | | 95 | 15 | 0 | 5 | 115 |

Last updated: 25 May 2024

=== Disciplinary record ===
Includes all competitive matches. Players listed below made at least one appearance for Celtic first squad during the season.

| N | P | Nat. | Name | Premiership | | | Scottish Cup | | | League Cup | | | Champions League | | | Total | | | Notes |
| N | P | Nat. | Name | Yellow card | Second yellow card | Red card | Yellow card | Second yellow card | Red card | Yellow card | Second yellow card | Red card | Yellow card | Second yellow card | Red card | Yellow card | Second yellow card | Red card | Notes |
| 38 | FW | (Japan) | Daizen Maeda | 4 | | | 1 | | | | | | | | 1 | 5 | | 1 | |
| 1 | GK | (England) | Joe Hart | 1 | | 1 | 1 | | | | | | | | | 2 | | 1 | |
| 13 | FW | (South Korea) | Yang Hyun-jun | 1 | | 1 | | | | | | | 1 | | | 2 | | 1 | |
| 15 | MF | (Norway) | Odin Thiago Holm | | | | | | | | | | | | 1 | | | 1 | |
| 4 | DF | (Sweden) | Gustaf Lagerbielke | | | | | | | | | | 1 | 1 | | 1 | 1 | | |
| 3 | DF | (Scotland) | Greg Taylor | 4 | | | 1 | | | | | | 3 | | | 8 | | | |
| 42 | MF | (Scotland) | Callum McGregor | 5 | | | 1 | | | 1 | | | 1 | | | 8 | | | |
| 2 | DF | (Canada) | Alistair Johnston | 5 | | | | | | | | | 2 | | | 7 | | | |
| 7 | FW | (Honduras) | Luis Palma | 2 | | | 1 | | | | | | 3 | | | 6 | | | |
| 5 | DF | (Ireland) | Liam Scales | 5 | | | | | | | | | | | | 5 | | | |
| 33 | MF | (Denmark) | Matt O'Riley | 3 | | | | | | | | | 1 | | | 4 | | | |
| 6 | DF | (England) | Nat Phillips | 1 | | | | | | | | | 1 | | | 2 | | | |
| 8 | FW | (Japan) | Kyogo Furuhashi | 2 | | | | | | | | | | | | 2 | | | |
| 10 | FW | (Germany) | Nicolas Kühn | 1 | | | 1 | | | | | | | | | 2 | | | |
| 14 | MF | (Scotland) | David Turnbull | 2 | | | | | | | | | | | | 2 | | | |
| 17 | DF | (Poland) | Maik Nawrocki | 2 | | | | | | | | | | | | 2 | | | |
| 25 | DF | (Argentina) | Alexandro Bernabei | 1 | | | 1 | | | | | | | | | 2 | | | |
| 28 | MF | (Portugal) | Paulo Bernardo | 2 | | | | | | | | | | | | 2 | | | |
| 9 | FW | (Ireland) | Adam Idah | 1 | | | | | | | | | | | | 1 | | | |
| 19 | FW | (South Korea) | Oh Hyeon-gyu | 1 | | | | | | | | | | | | 1 | | | |
| 20 | DF | (United States) | Cameron Carter-Vickers | | | | | | | | | | 1 | | | 1 | | | |
| 24 | MF | (Japan) | Tomoki Iwata | 1 | | | | | | | | | | | | 1 | | | |
| 39 | FW | (Ireland) | Rocco Vata | | | | 1 | | | | | | | | | 1 | | | |
| 41 | MF | (Japan) | Reo Hatate | 1 | | | | | | | | | | | | 1 | | | |
| 48 | MF | (Scotland) | Daniel Kelly | 1 | | | | | | | | | | | | 1 | | | |
| 49 | MF | (Scotland) | James Forrest | | | | 1 | | | | | | | | | 1 | | | |
| 56 | DF | (Scotland) | Anthony Ralston | | | | | | | 1 | | | | | | 1 | | | |
| 57 | DF | (Scotland) | Stephen Welsh | 1 | | | | | | | | | | | | 1 | | | |

Last updated: 25 May 2024
Source: Competitive matches
Only competitive matches
(yellow card) = Number of bookings; (second yellow card) = Number of sending offs after a second yellow card; (red card) = Number of sending offs by a direct red card.

=== Hat-tricks ===
| Player | Against | Result | Date | Competition |
|---|---|---|---|---|
| (Japan) Daizen Maeda | (Scotland) Livingston | 4–2 (H) | 10 March 2024 | Scottish Cup |

(H) – Home; (A) – Away; (N) – Neutral

=== Clean sheets ===
As of 25 May 2024.

| Rank | Name | Premiership | Scottish Cup | League Cup | Champions League | Total | Played Games |
|---|---|---|---|---|---|---|---|
| 1 | (England) Joe Hart | 14 | 3 | 0 | 0 | 17 | 49 |
| 2 | (Scotland) Scott Bain | 1 | 0 | 0 | 0 | 1 | 3 |
| 3 | (Switzerland) Benjamin Siegrist | 0 | 0 | 0 | 0 | 0 | 0 |
| Total | | 15 | 3 | 0 | 0 | 18 | 52 |

=== Attendances ===
As of match played 18 May 2024

| | Matches | Attendances | Average | High | Low |
|---|---|---|---|---|---|
| Premiership | 19 | 1,117,712 | 58,826 | 59,664 | 58,140 |
| Scottish Cup | 2 | 73,412 | 36,706 | 40,180 | 33,232 |
| League Cup | 0 | 0 | 0 | 0 | 0 |
| Champions League | 3 | 168,298 | 56,099 | 56,391 | 55,844 |
| Total | 24 | 1,359,422 | 56,642 | 59,664 | 33,232 |

== Team statistics ==
=== League table ===
| Pos | Team | Pld | W | D | L | GF | GA | GD | Pts | Qualification or relegation (Note: Teams play each other three times (33 matches), before the league is split into two groups (the top six and the bottom six).) |
|---|---|---|---|---|---|---|---|---|---|---|
| 1 | Celtic (C) | 38 | 29 | 6 | 3 | 95 | 30 | +65 | 93 | Qualification for the Champions League league stage |
| 2 | Rangers | 38 | 27 | 4 | 7 | 87 | 32 | +55 | 85 | Qualification for the Champions League third qualifying round |
| 3 | Heart of Midlothian | 38 | 20 | 8 | 10 | 54 | 42 | +12 | 68 | Qualification for the Europa League play-off round (Note: As the winners of the 2023–24 Scottish Cup, Celtic, qualified for the Champions League, the berth reserved for the cup winners (Europa League play-off round) passed to the third-placed team. The berths for the Europa League second qualifying round and the Conference League second qualifying round were passed down to the fourth- and fifth-placed teams.) |
| 4 | Kilmarnock | 38 | 14 | 14 | 10 | 46 | 44 | +2 | 56 | Qualification for the Europa League second qualifying round |
| 5 | St Mirren | 38 | 13 | 8 | 17 | 46 | 52 | −6 | 47 | Qualification for the Conference League second qualifying round |

Rules for classification: 1) Points; 2) Goal difference; 3) Goals scored; 4) Head-to-Head points; 5) Head-to-Head goal difference; 6) Play-off (only if deciding champion, UEFA competitions qualification, second stage group allocation or relegation).
(C) Champions

=== Competition overview ===
| Competition | First match | Last match | Starting round | Final position | Record | | | | | | | |
| Competition | First match | Last match | Starting round | Final position | Pld | W | D | L | GF | GA | GD | Win % |
|---|---|---|---|---|---|---|---|---|---|---|---|---|
| Premiership | 5 August 2023 | 18 May 2024 | Round 1 | Winners | 38 | 29 | 6 | 3 | 95 | 30 | +65 | 76.32 |
| Scottish Cup | 21 January 2024 | 25 May 2024 | Fourth round | Winners | 5 | 4 | 1 | 0 | 15 | 5 | +10 | 80.00 |
| League Cup | 20 August 2023 | 20 August 2023 | Second round | Second round | 1 | 0 | 0 | 1 | 0 | 1 | −1 | 0.00 |
| Champions League | 19 September 2023 | 13 December 2023 | Group stage | Group stage | 6 | 1 | 1 | 4 | 5 | 15 | −10 | 16.67 |
| Total | | | | | 50 | 34 | 8 | 8 | 115 | 51 | +64 | 68.00 |

Source: Soccerway

== Club ==
=== Management ===
| Position | Name |
|---|---|
| Manager | Brendan Rodgers |
| Assistant Manager | John Kennedy |
| First Team Coach | Harry Kewell (until 31 December 2023) |
| First Team Coach | Adam Sadler (from 31 December 2023) |
| First Team Coach | Gavin Strachan |
| Goalkeeping Coach | Stevie Woods |

=== Kit ===
Supplier: Adidas / Sponsors: Dafabet (front) and Magners (back)

The club will be in the fourth year of a deal with Adidas – the club's official kit supplier.

| Home | Away | Third | Goalkeeper 1 | Goalkeeper 2 | Goalkeeper 3 |

- Home: The home kit features the traditional green and white hoops with a black trim, and a modern pattern inspired by the stained-glass window from the original entrance to Celtic Park. White shorts and patterned socks complete the look.
- Away: The away kit features a black shirt with a green trim, and celebrates the club's Scottish heritage with intricate details on the collar and sleeve cuffs. The shirt is accompanied by black shorts and socks.
- Third: The third kit features a dark green shirt with light green details, and a sound wave design inspired by Glasgow's music scene. The shirt is accompanied by matching shorts and socks.

== Transfers ==
=== In ===
| Pos | Player | From | Type | Window | Fee |
|---|---|---|---|---|---|
| MF | (Japan) Tomoki Iwata | (Japan) Yokohama F. Marinos | Transfer | Summer | £830,000 |
| MF | (Norway) Odin Thiago Holm | (Norway) Vålerenga | Transfer | Summer | £2,500,000 |
| FW | (Australia) Marco Tilio | (Australia) Melbourne City | Transfer | Summer | £1,500,000 |
| FW | (South Korea) Yang Hyun-jun | (South Korea) Gangwon FC | Transfer | Summer | £2,100,000 |
| MF | (South Korea) Kwon Hyeok-kyu | (South Korea) Busan IPark | Transfer | Summer | £1,000,000 |
| DF | (Poland) Maik Nawrocki | (Poland) Legia Warsaw | Transfer | Summer | £4,300,000 |
| DF | (Sweden) Gustaf Lagerbielke | (Sweden) IF Elfsborg | Transfer | Summer | £3,000,000 |
| FW | (Honduras) Luis Palma | (Greece) Aris | Transfer | Summer | £3,500,000 |
| DF | (England) Nat Phillips | (England) Liverpool | Loan | Summer | Loan |
| MF | (Portugal) Paulo Bernardo | (Portugal) Benfica | Loan | Summer | Loan |
| DF | (Australia) Liam Bonetig | (Australia) Western Sydney Wanderers | Transfer | Summer | Undisclosed |
| FW | (Germany) Nicolas Kühn | (Austria) Rapid Wien | Transfer | Winter | £2,800,000 |
| FW | (Republic of Ireland) Adam Idah | (England) Norwich City | Loan | Winter | Loan |

Notes

1. Signed for Celtic B.

=== Out ===
| Pos | Player | To | Type | Window | Fee |
|---|---|---|---|---|---|
| DF | (Scotland) Dylan Corr | (Scotland) Raith Rovers | End of contract | Summer | Free |
| DF | (Scotland) Ewan Otoo | (Scotland) Dunfermline Athletic | Transfer | Summer | Undisclosed |
| MF | (Australia) Aaron Mooy | Retired | | | |
| DF | (Scotland) Adam Montgomery | (England) Fleetwood Town | Loan | Summer | Loan |
| FW | (Portugal) Jota | (Saudi Arabia) Al-Ittihad | Transfer | Summer | £25,000,000 |
| MF | (Scotland) Tsoanelo Letsosa | (Belgium) Lommel | End of contract | Summer | Free |
| FW | (Scotland) Adam Brooks | (Scotland) Inverness Caledonian Thistle | End of contract | Summer | Free |
| GK | (Northern Ireland) Conor Hazard | (England) Plymouth Argyle | Transfer | Summer | £150,000 |
| DF | (Scotland) Caleb Goldie | (Scotland) Peterhead | End of contract | Summer | Free |
| MF | (England) Liam Shaw | (England) Wigan Athletic | Loan | Summer | Loan |
| DF | (Netherlands) Osaze Urhoghide | (France) Amiens | Transfer | Summer | Undisclosed |
| GK | (Greece) Vasilis Barkas | (Netherlands) Utrecht | End of contract | Summer | Free |
| GK | (Northern Ireland) Josh Clarke | (Scotland) Airdrieonians | Emergency Loan | | |
| DF | (Sweden) Carl Starfelt | (Spain) Celta Vigo | Transfer | Summer | £4,300,000 |
| DF | (Scotland) Ben McPherson | (Scotland) Queen's Park | Loan | Summer | Loan |
| MF | (Scotland) Ben Summers | (Scotland) Dunfermline Athletic | Loan | Summer | Loan |
| MF | (Northern Ireland) Ben Wylie | (Sweden) Ytterhogdals IK | End of contract | Summer | Free |
| DF | (Republic of Ireland) Bosun Lawal | (England) Fleetwood Town | Loan | Summer | Loan |
| GK | (England) Tobi Oluwayemi | (Austria) Admira Wacker | Loan | Summer | Loan |
| DF | (Scotland) Matthew Anderson | (Austria) Admira Wacker | Loan | Summer | Loan |
| MF | (Ivory Coast) Ismaila Soro | (Israel) Beitar Jerusalem | Transfer | Summer | Free |
| FW | (Montenegro) Sead Hakšabanović | (England) Stoke City | Loan | Summer | Loan |
| FW | (Switzerland) Albian Ajeti | (Turkey) Gaziantep | Transfer | Summer | £500,000 |
| MF | (Scotland) Joe Murphy | (Scotland) Broomhill | End of contract | Summer | Free |
| DF | (Scotland) Evan Easton | (England) Sheffield United | End of contract | Summer | Free |
| MF | (Japan) Yosuke Ideguchi | (Japan) Vissel Kobe | Transfer | Winter | £870,000 |
| MF | (South Korea) Kwon Hyeok-kyu | (Scotland) St Mirren | Loan | Winter | Loan |
| DF | (Scotland) Adam Montgomery | (Scotland) Motherwell | Loan | Winter | Loan |
| MF | (Scotland) MacKenzie Carse | (Scotland) Queen's Park | Loan | Winter | Loan |
| FW | (Republic of Ireland) Johnny Kenny | (Republic of Ireland) Shamrock Rovers | Loan | Winter | Loan |
| FW | (Australia) Marco Tilio | (Australia) Melbourne City | Loan | Winter | Loan |
| FW | (Republic of Ireland) Mikey Johnston | (England) West Bromwich Albion | Loan | Winter | Loan |
| MF | (Scotland) David Turnbull | (Wales) Cardiff City | Transfer | Winter | £2,000,000 |
| GK | (Northern Ireland) Josh Clarke | (Scotland) Ayr United | Loan | Winter | Loan |
| DF | (Argentina) Alexandro Bernabei | (Brazil) Internacional | Loan | Winter | Loan |
| FW | (Israel) Liel Abada | (United States) Charlotte FC | Transfer | Winter | £10,000,000 |

== See also ==
- List of Celtic F.C. seasons
