= Daniel Kelly (footballer, born 2005) =

Scottish footballer (born 2005)

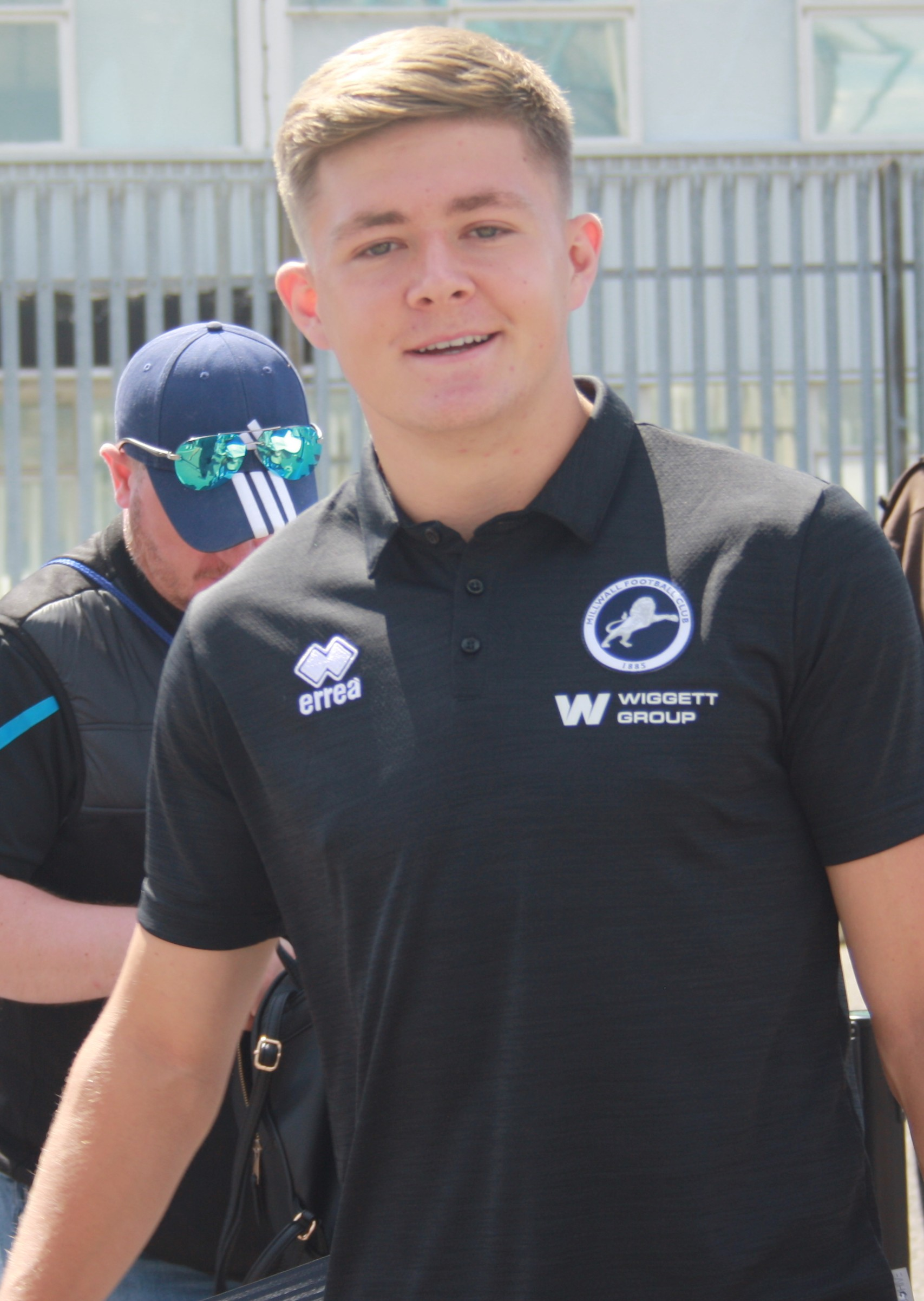
- Daniel Kelly in 2026

Personal information
- Full name: Daniel Kelly
- Date of birth: 3 October 2005 (age 21)
- Place of birth: East Kilbride, Scotland
- Height: 1.80 m (5 ft 11 in)
- Position: Midfielder

Team information
- Current team: Millwall
- Number: 16

Senior career*
Years	Team	Apps	(Gls)
2022–2024	Celtic B	32	(3)
2024	Celtic	4	(1)
2024–	Millwall	14	(0)

International career^{‡}
2022–2023	Scotland U18	4	(0)
2023–	Scotland U19	8	(0)
- * Club domestic league appearances and goals as of 1 September 2026 ‡ National team caps and goals as of 22:06, 16 March 2024 (UTC)

Daniel Kelly (born 3 October 2005) is a Scottish professional footballer who plays as a midfielder for EFL Championship club Millwall.

== Early life ==
Kelly attended St Leonards Primary School in Scotland and was described as "first caught the eye of Celtic playing above his age group for East Kilbride Caledonian Thistle's 2004 team". After that, he attended St Ninian's High School in Scotland and was described as "impressed a plethora of scouts from down south and further afield having starred for the Hoops' under 15s, 16s and even 18s. Kelly also showcased his talents in the Sheffield Trophy where a young Celts outfit finished runners up in the prestigious tournament to MLS side Seattle Sounders".

== Club career ==
Kelly started his career with Scottish side Celtic, making his debut during a 5–0 win over Buckie Thistle. He made his league debut for the club during a 7–1 win over Dundee. He scored his first goal for the club during the same 7–1 win over Dundee.

On 23 August 2024, Kelly moved to EFL Championship side Millwall on a long-term contract for an undisclosed fee.

== International career ==
Kelly has represented Scotland internationally at youth level.

== Style of play ==
Kelly mainly operates as a midfielder.

== Personal life ==
Kelly is the godson of Australia international Scott McDonald.

== Career statistics ==
As of match played 27 August 2024

Appearances and goals by club, season and competition
Club	Season	League			FA Cup		League Cup		Other		Total	
Club	Season	Division	Apps	Goals	Apps	Goals	Apps	Goals	Apps	Goals	Apps	Goals
Celtic	2023–24	Scottish Premiership	4	1	1	0	0	0	—		5	1
Millwall	2024–25	Championship	0	0	0	0	1	0	—		1	0
Career total			4	1	1	0	1	0	0	0	6	1

== Honours ==
- Scottish Premiership: 2023–24 - didn’t play enough games to get a medal
- Scottish Cup: 2023–24
