= Josh Peters =

Josh Peters may refer to:

- Josh Peters (rugby union), Spanish rugby union player
- Josh Peters (footballer), Scottish footballer
- Josh Peters (producer), American film producer

== See also ==
- Joshua Peters, member of the Missouri House of Representatives
- Josh Pieters, South African YouTuber
