= 2023–24 Scottish Cup =

Tournament details
- Country: Scotland
- Dates: 12 August 2023 – 25 May 2024
- Teams: 131

Final positions
- Champions: Celtic
- Runners-up: Rangers

Tournament statistics
- Matches played: 130
- Goals scored: 477 (3.67 per match)
- Top goal scorer(s): Bojan Miovski; Daizen Maeda; Cameron Ross; Michael Ruth (4 goals)

The 2023–24 Scottish Cup (known as the Scottish Gas Men's Scottish Cup for sponsorship reasons) was the 139th season of Scotland's most prestigious football knockout competition. The 2023–24 edition marked the 150th anniversary of the tournament which was established in 1873–74. The winners would qualify for the 2024–25 Europa League play-off round.

Celtic were the defending champions after defeating Inverness Caledonian Thistle in the 2023 final and successfully defended their title after beating Rangers 1–0 in the final.

== Calendar ==
Following an increase in the number of entries, an additional preliminary round was added to the competition format. Replays were also removed entirely from the tournament, having been restricted to just the Preliminary Round in the previous season.

Round	Original date	Number of fixtures	Clubs	New Entries	Leagues entering at this round
Preliminary round one	12 August 2023	3	131 → 128	7	7 qualifiers
Preliminary round two	2 September 2023	26	128 → 102	48	48 licensed clubs
First round	23 September 2023	30	102 → 72	34	18 Highland League teams 16 Lowland League teams
Second round	28 October 2023	20	72 → 52	10	10 League Two teams
Third round	25 November 2023	20	52 → 32	20	10 Championship teams 10 League One teams
Fourth round	20 January 2024	16	32 → 16	12	12 Premiership teams
Fifth round	10 February 2024	8	16 → 8	None	
Quarter-finals	9 March 2024	4	8 → 4	None	
Semi-finals	20 & 21 April 2024	2	4 → 2	None	
Final	25 May 2024	1	2 → 1	None	

== Preliminary round one ==
The draw for preliminary round one was made on 26 July 2023. The seven teams without an SFA club licence were required to be included in the first preliminary round draw – namely Abbey Vale (South of Scotland League champions), Beith Juniors (West of Scotland League champions), Carnoustie Panmure (Midlands League champions), Culter (North Region Juniors champions), Cupar Hearts (Amateur Cup winners), Loch Ness (North Caledonian League champions), and Luncarty (Cup Winners' Shield winners). They were drawn into three ties with Culter drawn to receive a bye to the second preliminary round.

Abbey Vale, Cupar Hearts, Loch Ness, and Luncarty all took part in the competition for the first time.

=== Matches ===
12 August 2023	Carnoustie Panmure	1–2	Beith Juniors	Carnoustie
15:00	Stephen 46'		Diver 32', 69'	Stadium: Laing Park; Referee: Tom Danaher

12 August 2023	Luncarty	3–1	Loch Ness	Luncarty
15:00	Woolley 22'; Davies 30'; MacKie 81'		Race 67'	Stadium: Brownlands Park; Referee: Jamie McCunnie

12 August 2023	Abbey Vale	0–5	Cupar Hearts	New Abbey
14:00			Craig 24', 39'; Harris 60'; McGlashan 73', 89'	Stadium: Maryfield Park; Referee: Barry Cook

== Preliminary round two ==
The draw for preliminary round two was made on 26 July 2023. Carluke Rovers are taking part in the competition for the first time having gained their SFA club licence, along with Glenafton Athletic who previously competed as a qualifier.

Teams in bold advanced to the first round.

East of Scotland League	West of Scotland League	Others
Premier Division: **Broxburn Athletic**; **Dunbar United**; **Dundonald Bluebell**; Haddington Athletic; Hill of Beath Hawthorn; **Hutchison Vale**; **Jeanfield Swifts**; **Luncarty**; **Musselburgh Athletic**; **Penicuik Athletic**; **Sauchie Juniors**; Tynecastle; First Division: Blackburn United; **Camelon Juniors**; **Dunipace**; Newtongrange Star; Preston Athletic; **St Andrews United**; Vale of Leithen; **Whitehill Welfare**; Second Division: Burntisland Shipyard; Coldstream; **Dalkeith Thistle**; Easthouses Lily Miners Welfare; Third Division: Hawick Royal Albert	Premier Division: **Auchinleck Talbot**; **Beith Juniors**; Benburb; **Clydebank**; **Cumnock Juniors**; **Darvel**; Glenafton Athletic; Irvine Meadow; **Pollok**; First Division: **Kilwinning Rangers**; Rutherglen Glencairn; Second Division: Bonnyton Thistle; Glasgow University; Third Division: Girvan; **Threave Rovers**; Fourth Division: Carluke Rovers	Midlands League: Lochee United; **Tayport**; North Caledonian League: Fort William; **Golspie Sutherland**; North Region Junior Football League: **Culter**; South of Scotland League: Creetown; **Dalbeattie Star**; Newton Stewart; St Cuthbert Wanderers; Wigtown & Bladnoch; Kingdom of Fife AFA: Cupar Hearts

=== Matches ===
2 September 2023	**Beith Juniors**	**5–1**	Bonnyton Thistle	Beith
14:00	Rossiter 43', 65'; Diver 55', 80'; Monk 83'		McAvoy 18'	Stadium: Bellsdale Park; Attendance: 108; Referee: Stuart Broadfoot

2 September 2023	**Culter**	**3–2**	Blackburn United	Peterculter
14:30	Fraser 31'; Clark 43', 67'		Devine 47', 90'	Stadium: Crombie Park; Referee: Sean Murdoch

2 September 2023	Preston Athletic	**0–0** (a.e.t.) (**4–5** p)	**Dundonald Bluebell**	Prestonpans
15:00				Stadium: Pennypit Park; Attendance: 163; Referee: Regan Wallace

2 September 2023	Hill of Beath Hawthorn	**0–1**	**Tayport**	Hill of Beath
15:00			Robertson 29'	Stadium: Keir's Park; Attendance: 171; Referee: Jamie Wilkie

2 September 2023	**Dunbar United**	**4–2**	Vale of Leithen	Dunbar
15:00	Barfoot 4', 78', 87'; Whitson 72'		Flynn 25', 53'	Stadium: New Countess Park; Attendance: 257; Referee: Ross Menzies

2 September 2023	Carluke Rovers	**2–3** (a.e.t.)	**Dalbeattie Star**	Carluke
14:00	McGurn 15'; Small 21'		Milligan 33', 59'; Hunter 114'	Stadium: John Cumming Stadium; Attendance: 230; Referee: Connor Ashwood

2 September 2023	Tynecastle	**0–1**	**Hutchison Vale**	Edinburgh
14:30			Chisholm 77'	Stadium: Meggetland Sports Complex; Attendance: 110; Referee: Michael McCart

2 September 2023	**Jeanfield Swifts**	**3–0**	Cupar Hearts	Perth
12:30	McLeish 2'; Mollison 19'; Scott 88'			Stadium: Riverside Stadium; Attendance: 221; Referee: Joel Kennedy

2 September 2023	**St Andrews United**	**1–0**	Haddington Athletic	St Andrews
14:30	Redpath 71'			Stadium: Clayton Caravan Park Recreation Ground; Attendance: 382; Referee: Mike Roncone

2 September 2023	Wigtown & Bladnoch	**0–12**	**Auchinleck Talbot**	Wigtown
15:00			Boyd 1', 18', 23', 35'; Smith 6', 46', 58'; Henderson 8' (o.g.); Wardrope 48'; Abed 75'; Kennedy 83', 90'	Stadium: Trammondford Park; Referee: Daniel Graves

2 September 2023	Irvine Meadow	**1–2**	**Dunipace**	Irvine
15:00	Lennox 77'		Herron 16'; Ashe 89'	Stadium: Meadow Park; Attendance: 345; Referee: Terry Ormiston

2 September 2023	**Pollok**	**2–2** (a.e.t.) (**3–0** p)	Benburb	Glasgow
15:00	Forde 59', 67'		Fraser 27'; Black 30'	Stadium: Newlandsfield Park; Attendance: 874; Referee: Greg Soutar
	**Penalties**
	Mullen (penalty scored); Duff (penalty scored); McGregor (penalty scored)		(penalty missed) Fraser; (penalty missed) Smith

2 September 2023	Newton Stewart	**1–4**	**Luncarty**	Newton Stewart
15:00	MacDonald 39'		Carlon 15'; Davies 49', 70', 75'	Stadium: Blairmount Park; Attendance: 176; Referee: Clyde Buchan

2 September 2023	**Sauchie Juniors**	**4–0**	Burntisland Shipyard	Sauchie
15:00	Thomson 36'; Payne 62', 87'; Fisher 89'			Stadium: Beechwood Park; Attendance: 125; Referee: Ryan Kennedy

2 September 2023	St Cuthbert Wanderers	**0–5**	**Dalkeith Thistle**	Kirkcudbright
15:00			Gould 11'; Brockie 72', 77'; Greig 83'; Brown 90+1'	Stadium: St Mary's Park; Referee: Steven Spence

2 September 2023	Hawick Royal Albert	**1–2**	**Golspie Sutherland**	Hawick
15:00	Scholtes 55'		Cameron 31'; MacKenzie 76'	Stadium: Albert Park; Referee: Paul Timmons

2 September 2023	**Cumnock Juniors**	**1–0**	Girvan	Cumnock
15:00	McKernon 7'			Stadium: Townhead Park; Attendance: 250; Referee: Brent Falconer

2 September 2023	Creetown	**1–3**	**Whitehill Welfare**	Creetown
15:00	Jones 33'		O'Neill 50'; Ballard 52'; Devers 68'	Stadium: Castlecary Park; Referee: Josh Hay

2 September 2023	**Camelon Juniors**	**0–0** (a.e.t.) (**4–3** p)	Newtongrange Star	Camelon
14:30				Stadium: Carmuirs Park; Attendance: 400; Referee: Gary Hanvidge
	**Penalties**
	Sinclair (penalty scored); McAllister (penalty scored); Smith (penalty scored); Peddie (penalty scored)		(penalty missed) Adam; (penalty scored) Nelson; (penalty missed) Jones; (penalty scored) McKenzie; (penalty scored) Logan

2 September 2023	Easthouses Lily Miners Welfare	**1–3**	**Threave Rovers**	Easthouses
14:30	Hill 42'		Potts 2'; Cairnie 25'; Sloan 38'	Stadium: Newbattle Complex; Referee: Chris Hughes

2 September 2023	**Kilwinning Rangers**	**4–0**	Glasgow University	Kilwinning
15:00	Boyd 2'; Mackin 29'; MacCalman 57'; Lewis 77'			Stadium: Buffs Park; Attendance: 172; Referee: Cameron Stirling

2 September 2023	**Broxburn Athletic**	**3–0**	Lochee United	Broxburn
14:30	Locke 47', 63'; Turner 49'			Stadium: Albyn Park; Attendance: 320; Referee: Andy Gamble

2 September 2023	**Penicuik Athletic**	**4–2**	Rutherglen Glencairn	Penicuik
14:30	Wardlaw 16'; Forbes 57'; Melvin 72'; Buckle 84'		Fitzpatrick 51'; McManus 68'	Stadium: Montgomery Park; Attendance: 268; Referee: Jordan Curran

2 September 2023	Glenafton Athletic	**0–3**	**Darvel**	New Cumnock
14:00			McShane 14'; Cairns 64'; Murphy 90'	Stadium: Loch Park; Referee: Alex Shepherd

2 September 2023	Fort William	**1–10**	**Clydebank**	Fort William
19:30	Munro 12'		Little 16', 36', 49'; Niven 29'; Collins 31', 38'; Mulcahey 43', 84'; Gallacher 70'; McMahon 79'	Stadium: Claggan Park; Referee: Gordon Seago

2 September 2023	**Musselburgh Athletic**	**6–0**	Coldstream	Musselburgh
15:00	Evans 11'; Barker 33', 39'; Stevenson 49', 62'; Smith 59'			Stadium: Olivebank Stadium; Attendance: 338; Referee: Ross Birrell

== First round ==
The draw for the first round was made on 3 September 2023.

Teams in bold advanced to the second round.

Highland League	Lowland League	East of Scotland League	West of Scotland League	Others
**Banks O' Dee**; **Brechin City**; **Brora Rangers**; **Buckie Thistle**; **Clachnacuddin**; **Deveronvale**; **Formartine United**; **Forres Mechanics**; **Fraserburgh**; **Huntly**; Inverurie Loco Works; Keith; Lossiemouth; Nairn County; Rothes; Strathspey Thistle; **Turriff United**; Wick Academy	**Albion Rovers**; Berwick Rangers; **Bo'ness United**; **Broomhill**; Caledonian Braves; **Civil Service Strollers**; **Cowdenbeath**; Cumbernauld Colts; **East Kilbride**; East Stirlingshire; Edinburgh University; **Gala Fairydean Rovers**; Gretna 2008; Linlithgow Rose; **Tranent**; University of Stirling	Premier Division: **Broxburn Athletic**; **Dunbar United**; Dundonald Bluebell; Hutchison Vale; **Jeanfield Swifts**; **Luncarty**; **Musselburgh Athletic**; Penicuik Athletic; Sauchie Juniors; First Division: Camelon Juniors; Dunipace; **St Andrews United**; Whitehill Welfare; Second Division: Dalkeith Thistle	Premier Division: Auchinleck Talbot; **Beith Juniors**; **Clydebank**; **Cumnock Juniors**; Darvel; **Pollok**; First Division: **Kilwinning Rangers**; Third Division: Threave Rovers	Midlands League: Tayport; North Caledonian League: Golspie Sutherland; North Region Junior Football League: Culter; South of Scotland League: Dalbeattie Star

=== Matches ===
23 September 2023	Culter	**3–4** (a.e.t.)	**Deveronvale**	Peterculter
14:30	Clark 11', 35'; Mathers 84'		McKay 34'; McLellan 67', 105'; Petermann 90'	Stadium: Crombie Park; Referee: Kyle Hall

23 September 2023	Penicuik Athletic	**0–6**	**Pollok**	Penicuik
14:30			Mullen 3'; McKenzie 12'; Young 18' (o.g.); Forde 39'; Duff 88'; Maley 90'	Stadium: Montgomery Park; Referee: Joel Kennedy

23 September 2023	**Cowdenbeath**	**2–1** (a.e.t.)	Linlithgow Rose	Cowdenbeath
15:00	Docherty 25', 95'		Skinner 72'	Stadium: Central Park; Attendance: 443; Referee: Harry Bruce

23 September 2023	**Clachnacuddin**	**1–0**	Inverurie Loco Works	Inverness
15:00	Bunce 37'			Stadium: Grant Street Park; Referee: Lewis Hogarth

23 September 2023	Dalkeith Thistle	**0–7**	**Clydebank**	Dalkeith
15:00			Little 40'; Collins 45', 45'; McGonigle 57', 68'; Grant 62'; Graham 90'	Stadium: King's Park; Referee: Kieran O'Reilly

23 September 2023	**Formartine United**	**3–2**	Threave Rovers	Pitmedden
15:00	Wade 7'; Campbell 41'; Stewart 87'		Dunglinson 63'; Cairnie 81'	Stadium: North Lodge Park; Referee: Thomas Denholm

23 September 2023	Dunipace	**1–3** (a.e.t.)	**Cumnock Juniors**	Denny
15:00	Tennant 36'		McGaughey 58', 95'; Conn 107'	Stadium: Westfield Park; Referee: Alan Budd

23 September 2023	**Gala Fairydean Rovers**	**8–2**	Strathspey Thistle	Galashiels
15:00	Beaumont 25'; Reid 32', 36'; Watt 33'; Semple 39', 48', 56'; Drammeh 90'		Davies 15'; MacKenzie 20'	Stadium: Netherdale; Referee: Ross Birrell

23 September 2023	Lossiemouth	**0–4**	**Beith Juniors**	Lossiemouth
15:00			Rossiter 39'; Rough 56'; Diver 62'; Monti 84'	Stadium: Grant Park; Referee: Tom Danaher

23 September 2023	Wick Academy	**1–3**	**Jeanfield Swifts**	Wick
15:00	Halliday 69'		McLean 29' (o.g.); Smith 44'; McLeish 60'	Stadium: Harmsworth Park; Referee: Michael McCart

23 September 2023	Edinburgh University	**2–3**	**Dunbar United**	Edinburgh
15:00	Aitken 38'; Hendry 81'		Stewart 43'; Hendry 64'; Whitson 72'	Stadium: East Peffermill; Referee: Mike Roncone

23 September 2023	Caledonian Braves	**1–2**	**Fraserburgh**	Motherwell
15:00	McDowall 89'		Sargent 67', 87'	Stadium: Alliance Park; Referee: Jamie Wilkie

23 September 2023	**Banks O' Dee**	**6–0**	Dalbeattie Star	Aberdeen
15:00	MacLeod 42', 49'; Alexander 45', 46', 63'; Antoniazzi 48'			Stadium: Spain Park; Referee: Cameron Stirling

23 September 2023	**Bo'ness United**	**3–0**	Darvel	Bo'ness
15:00	Porteous 34'; Stenhouse 60'; Stevenson 71'			Stadium: Newtown Park; Referee: Gary Hanvidge

23 September 2023	**Turriff United**	**2–1**	Sauchie Juniors	Turriff
15:00	McKenzie 31'; Clark 47'		Smith 11'	Stadium: The Haughs; Referee: Nathan Clac-Mansfield

23 September 2023	Golspie Sutherland	**1–1** (a.e.t.) (**7–8** p)	**Forres Mechanics**	Golspie
15:00	Sutherland 65'		Cairns 23'	Stadium: King George V Park; Referee: Conor Greenan

23 September 2023	Tayport	**0–4**	**Buckie Thistle**	Tayport
15:00			MacAskill 8'; McCabe 17'; Murray 41'; McHardy 71'	Stadium: The Canniepairt; Referee: Euan Birch

23 September 2023	Camelon Juniors	**1–2**	**Civil Service Strollers**	Camelon
15:00	Collumbine 53'		Laird 18'; Lawson 90'	Stadium: Carmuirs Park; Attendance: 291; Referee: Ross Menzies

23 September 2023	**Brechin City**	**4–0**	Rothes	Brechin
15:00	McGrath 2', 47', 50'; Heenan 90'			Stadium: Glebe Park; Attendance: 447; Referee: Ross Hardie

23 September 2023	East Stirlingshire	**0–1**	**Huntly**	Falkirk
15:00			Hunter 90'	Stadium: Falkirk Stadium; Referee: Ross Clark

23 September 2023	**Musselburgh Athletic**	**1–1** (a.e.t.) (**4–3** p)	Gretna 2008	Musselburgh
15:00	Smith 56'		Viviani 48'	Stadium: Olivebank Stadium; Referee: Josh Hay

23 September 2023	**East Kilbride**	**8–0**	Whitehill Welfare	East Kilbride
15:00	McGowan 18', 25'; Flanagan 22'; MacDonald 28', 47', 55'; Kelly 59'; MacKenzie 68'			Stadium: K-Park Training Academy; Referee: Clyde Buchan

23 September 2023	Keith	**2–5**	**Luncarty**	Keith
15:00	Brownlie 36'; Cooper 80'		Woolley 28'; Green 41', 60'; Davies 49'; Mitchell 90'	Stadium: Kynoch Park; Referee: Ryan Kennedy

23 September 2023	**Broxburn Athletic**	**2–1**	Nairn County	Broxburn
15:00	Turner 15'; Page 41'		McKenzie 90'	Stadium: Albyn Park; Attendance: 420; Referee: Terry Ormiston

23 September 2023	Dundonald Bluebell	**2–3**	**Kilwinning Rangers**	Cardenden
15:00	Sibanda 6'; Durie 28'		Stuart 38'; Mackin 43'; Wood 47'	Stadium: Moorside Park; Referee: Keiran Trayner

23 September 2023	**Brora Rangers**	**5–1**	Berwick Rangers	Brora
15:00	A. MacRae 21', 41', 66'; J. MacRae 38'; Ewan 58'		Ferguson 29'	Stadium: Dudgeon Park; Referee: Connor Ashwood

23 September 2023	**Tranent**	**4–1**	Hutchison Vale	Tranent
15:00	Harrison 48' (o.g.); Ross 53'; McCrory-Irving 54'; Mylchreest 76'		Viola 43'	Stadium: Foresters Park; Referee: Sean Murdoch

23 September 2023	**St Andrews United**	**1–0**	Auchinleck Talbot	St Andrews
15:00	Andrew 63'			Stadium: Clayton Caravan Park Recreation Ground; Referee: Ross Donaldson

24 September 2023	**Broomhill**	**3–1**	Cumbernauld Colts	Dumbarton
14:00	Kennedy 14'; O'Donnell 67'; Hunter 78'		Mortimer 30'	Stadium: Dumbarton Football Stadium; Referee: Paul Timmons

25 September 2023	University of Stirling	**1–3**	**Albion Rovers**	Stirling
19:05	Scally 51'		Prince 38'; Bevan 57'; Joseph 61'	Stadium: Forthbank Stadium; Referee: Stewart Luke

== Second round ==
The draw for the second round was made on 24 September 2023 at 5pm live on the Scottish Cup YouTube channel. Teams in italics were unknown at the time of the draw. Teams in bold advanced to the third round.

League Two	Highland League	Lowland League	East of Scotland League	West of Scotland League
**Bonnyrigg Rose**; **Clyde**; **Dumbarton**; East Fife; Elgin City; **Forfar Athletic**; **Peterhead**; Stenhousemuir; **Stranraer**; **The Spartans**	Banks O' Dee; Brechin City; **Brora Rangers**; **Buckie Thistle**; Clachnacuddin; Deveronvale; **Formartine United**; Forres Mechanics; Fraserburgh; Huntly; Turriff United	**Albion Rovers**; Bo'ness United; **Broomhill**; Civil Service Strollers; **Cowdenbeath**; East Kilbride; Gala Fairydean Rovers; **Tranent**	Premier Division: **Broxburn Athletic**; **Dunbar United**; **Jeanfield Swifts**; Luncarty; Musselburgh Athletic; First Division: St Andrews United	Premier Division: Beith Juniors; Clydebank; **Cumnock Juniors**; **Pollok**; First Division: Kilwinning Rangers

=== Matches ===
28 October 2023	Beith Juniors	**1–3**	**Broomhill**	Beith
14:00	Diver 69'		McColm 55'; Roberts 62', 84'	Stadium: Bellsdale Park; Attendance: 310; Referee: Michael McCart

28 October 2023	Civil Service Strollers	**0–3**	**Stranraer**	Edinburgh
15:00			Girvan 56'; Ross 72'; Robertson 85'	Stadium: Christie Gillies Park; Referee: Duncan Nicolson

28 October 2023	**Albion Rovers**	**2–1**	St Andrews United	Coatbridge
15:00	Joseph 66'; McCaw 75'		Sawers 72'	Stadium: Cliftonhill; Attendance: 511; Referee: Keiran Trayner

28 October 2023	Stenhousemuir	**0–2**	**Brora Rangers**	Stenhousemuir
15:00			Sutherland 19'; MacRae 60'	Stadium: Ochilview Park; Attendance: 412; Referee: Gavin Duncan

28 October 2023	**Cumnock Juniors**	**2–1**	Turriff United	Cumnock
15:00	McLennan 51'; McLaughlin 64'		Cormack 44'	Stadium: Townhead Park; Attendance: 270; Referee: Ryan Kennedy

28 October 2023	Kilwinning Rangers	**0–1**	**Cowdenbeath**	Kilwinning
15:00			Cunningham 81'	Stadium: Buffs Park; Attendance: 529; Referee: Gary Hanvidge

28 October 2023	**Peterhead**	**3–1**	Clachnacuddin	Peterhead
15:00	Ward 16'; McAllister 38' (pen.); Shanks 75'		Ferguson 39'	Stadium: Balmoor Stadium; Attendance: 508; Referee: Andy Gamble

28 October 2023	Deveronvale	**0–1**	**Broxburn Athletic**	Banff
15:00			Brass 19'	Stadium: Princess Royal Park; Attendance: 320; Referee: Jamie Wilkie

28 October 2023	Forres Mechanics	**0–1**	**Buckie Thistle**	Forres
15:00			Murray 39'	Stadium: Mosset Park; Attendance: 541; Referee: Ross Birrell

28 October 2023	**Dumbarton**	**3–2**	Banks O' Dee	Dumbarton
15:00	T. Wallace 71' (pen.); Ruth 90', 90'		H. MacLeod 5'; Wood 51'	Stadium: Dumbarton Football Stadium; Attendance: 385; Referee: Ross Clark

28 October 2023	**Dunbar United**	**1–0**	East Fife	Dunbar
15:00	Whitson 45' (pen.)			Stadium: New Countess Park; Attendance: 749; Referee: George Calder

28 October 2023	Fraserburgh	**1–2** (a.e.t.)	**Bonnyrigg Rose**	Fraserburgh
15:00	Cowie 90'		Mailer 82'; Barrett 96'	Stadium: Bellslea Park; Attendance: 319; Referee: Daniel Graves

28 October 2023	**Tranent**	**7–0**	East Kilbride	Tranent
15:00	Ross 7', 18', 39', 44'; Watson 17', 48'; Higginbotham 73'			Stadium: Foresters Park; Attendance: 485; Referee: Steven MacDonald

28 October 2023	**Formartine United**	**3–2**	Clydebank	Pitmedden
15:00	Wade 26', 62'; Emslie 78'		Low 1'; Kelly 90'	Stadium: North Lodge Park; Referee: Andrew Craven

28 October 2023	Brechin City	**1–2**	**The Spartans**	Brechin
15:00	Thomson 80'		Whyte 49'; Allan 65'	Stadium: Glebe Park; Attendance: 384; Referee: Ryan Lee

28 October 2023	**Jeanfield Swifts**	**6–0**	Elgin City	Perth
15:00	Robertson 3', 28'; McLeish 9' (pen.), 22'; Scott 58', 77'			Stadium: Riverside Stadium; Attendance: 439; Referee: Alex Shepherd

28 October 2023	Huntly	**1–4** (a.e.t.)	**Forfar Athletic**	Huntly
15:00	Dangana 16'		Allan 90'; Whatley 92'; Ferguson 95'; Paterson 102'	Stadium: Christie Park; Referee: Stewart Luke

28 October 2023	**Pollok**	**5–2**	Gala Fairydean Rovers	Glasgow
15:00	McGregor 3', 15'; Forde 62', 71'; Kerr 90'		Reid 8'; Galbraith 45' (pen.)	Stadium: Newlandsfield Park; Attendance: 1,133; Referee: Sean Murdoch

30 October 2023	Musselburgh Athletic	**2–3** (a.e.t.)	**Clyde**	Musselburgh
19:45	Todd 83'; Renton 120'		Young 75'; Rennie 94'; Leslie 114'	Stadium: Olivebank Stadium; Referee: Ross Hardie

4 November 2023	Luncarty	**0–1**	**Bo'ness United**	Luncarty
13:30			Grant 77'	Stadium: Brownlands Park; Attendance: 349; Referee: Ross Menzies

== Third round ==
The draw for the third round was made on 29 October 2023 at 7:30pm live on the Scottish Cup YouTube channel.

Teams in italics were unknown at the time of the draw.

Teams in bold advanced to the fourth round.

Championship	League One	League Two	Tier 5	Tier 6
**Airdrieonians**; Arbroath; **Ayr United**; Dundee United; Dunfermline Athletic; **Greenock Morton**; **Inverness Caledonian Thistle**; **Partick Thistle**; Queen's Park; **Raith Rovers**	**Alloa Athletic**; Annan Athletic; **Cove Rangers**; Edinburgh City; **Falkirk**; Hamilton Academical; **Kelty Hearts**; **Montrose**; **Queen of the South**; Stirling Albion	**Bonnyrigg Rose**; **Clyde**; **Dumbarton**; **Forfar Athletic**; Peterhead; **The Spartans**; Stranraer	Highland League: **Brora Rangers**; **Buckie Thistle**; Formartine United; Lowland League: Albion Rovers; Bo'ness United; **Broomhill**; Cowdenbeath; Tranent	East of Scotland League Premier Division: Broxburn Athletic; Dunbar United; Jeanfield Swifts; West of Scotland League Premier Division: Cumnock Juniors; Pollok

=== Matches ===
24 November 2023	Dunfermline Athletic	**0–3**	**Raith Rovers**	Dunfermline
19:45			Hamilton 15'; Stanton 65'; Vaughan 70'	Stadium: East End Park; Attendance: 5,243; Referee: Willie Collum

24 November 2023	**Clyde**	**2–0**	Jeanfield Swifts	Hamilton
19:45	L. Scullion 68'; Dunachie 84'			Stadium: New Douglas Park; Attendance: 951; Referee: Duncan Nicolson

25 November 2023	Cumnock Juniors	**0–3**	**Broomhill**	Cumnock
15:00			McColm 30', 65'; O'Donnell 49'	Stadium: Townhead Park; Referee: Sean Murdoch

25 November 2023	**Partick Thistle**	**3–0**	Queen's Park	Glasgow
15:00	Alston 36'; Fitzpatrick 41', 50'			Stadium: Firhill Stadium; Attendance: 2,520; Referee: Iain Snedden

25 November 2023	**Greenock Morton**	**4–0**	Bo'ness United	Greenock
15:00	Oakley 45'; Bearne 63'; Muirhead 79' (pen.); O'Boy 89'			Stadium: Cappielow; Attendance: 1,208; Referee: Craig Napier

25 November 2023	Annan Athletic	**4–5** (a.e.t.)	**Dumbarton**	Annan
15:00	Nugent 48'; Docherty 55'; Smith 73', 100'		Ruth 5', 113'; R. Wallace 42'; Gray 88'; Hilton 118'	Stadium: Galabank; Attendance: 387; Referee: Ryan Lee

25 November 2023	Stranraer	**0–1**	**Airdrieonians**	Stranraer
15:00			C. Gallagher 25'	Stadium: Stair Park; Attendance: 505; Referee: Grant Irvine

25 November 2023	Dunbar United	**1–2**	**Alloa Athletic**	Dunbar
15:00	Barfoot 13'		Cawley 31'; Sammon 45'	Stadium: New Countess Park; Referee: Lloyd Wilson

25 November 2023	Broxburn Athletic	**2–2** (a.e.t.) (**4–5** p)	**Buckie Thistle**	Broxburn
15:00	Douglas 81'; Turner 120'		McHardy 90'; Peters 120'	Stadium: Albyn Park; Attendance: 1,172; Referee: Greg Soutar
	**Penalties**
	Turner (penalty scored); Nimmo (penalty scored); Thomson (penalty scored); Brass (penalty scored); Douglas (penalty missed)		(penalty scored) Murray; (penalty scored) McHardy; (penalty scored) MacKinnon; (penalty scored) MacIver; (penalty scored) Peters

25 November 2023	Hamilton Academical	**0–2**	**Kelty Hearts**	Hamilton
15:00			Lyon 66'; Moore 75'	Stadium: New Douglas Park; Attendance: 519; Referee: Peter Stuart

25 November 2023	**Brora Rangers**	**1–0**	Pollok	Brora
15:00	MacRae 34'			Stadium: Dudgeon Park; Referee: Alex Shepherd

25 November 2023	**Montrose**	**3–0**	Edinburgh City	Montrose
15:00	Watson 63'; Hester 78', 80'			Stadium: Links Park; Attendance: 423; Referee: Calum Scott

25 November 2023	**Falkirk**	**3–0**	Formartine United	Falkirk
15:00	Ross 34'; Miller 37'; MacIver 39'			Stadium: Falkirk Stadium; Attendance: 2,273; Referee: Jordan Curran

25 November 2023	Stirling Albion	**0–2**	**Cove Rangers**	Stirling
15:00			Doyle 10'; Connell 50'	Stadium: Forthbank Stadium; Attendance: 566; Referee: Duncan Williams

25 November 2023	**Inverness Caledonian Thistle**	**2–0**	Cowdenbeath	Inverness
15:00	Wotherspoon 80'; McKay 84'			Stadium: Caledonian Stadium; Attendance: 1,037; Referee: Graham Grainger

25 November 2023	Peterhead	**1–2**	**Ayr United**	Peterhead
15:00	Shanks 60'		McGinty 90'; Bryden 116'	Stadium: Balmoor Stadium; Attendance: 820; Referee: Steven Kirkland

25 November 2023	Tranent	**0–1**	**Forfar Athletic**	Tranent
15:00			Allan 68'	Stadium: Foresters Park; Referee: Scott Lambie

25 November 2023	**Queen of the South**	**2–2** (a.e.t.) (**4–3** p)	Dundee United	Dumfries
15:00	Reilly 17'; Connelly 50'		Fotheringham 6', 58'	Stadium: Palmerston Park; Attendance: 1,603; Referee: Chris Graham
	**Penalties**
	Todd (penalty scored); Johnstone (penalty scored); Irving (penalty scored); Connelly (penalty scored)		(penalty scored) Holt; (penalty scored) Moult; (penalty scored) Middleton; (penalty missed) Grimshaw; (penalty missed) Cudjoe

25 November 2023	**The Spartans**	**2–1**	Arbroath	Edinburgh
15:00	Craigen 35'; Dishington 50'		Gold 49'	Stadium: Ainslie Park; Attendance: 647; Referee: Euan Anderson

25 November 2023	Albion Rovers	**0–1**	**Bonnyrigg Rose**	Coatbridge
15:00			Martyniuk 45' (pen.)	Stadium: Cliftonhill; Referee: Andy Gamble

== Fourth round ==
The draw for the fourth round was made on 26 November 2023 during Sportscene on the BBC Scotland channel.

Teams in bold advanced to the fifth round.

Premiership	Championship	League One	League Two	Tier 5
**Aberdeen**; **Celtic**; Dundee; **Heart of Midlothian**; **Hibernian**; **Kilmarnock**; **Livingston**; **Motherwell**; **Rangers**; Ross County; St Johnstone; **St Mirren**	**Airdrieonians**; **Ayr United**; **Greenock Morton**; **Inverness Caledonian Thistle**; **Partick Thistle**; Raith Rovers	Alloa Athletic; **Cove Rangers**; Falkirk; Kelty Hearts; Montrose; Queen of the South	**Bonnyrigg Rose**; Clyde; Dumbarton; Forfar Athletic; The Spartans	Highland League: Brora Rangers; Buckie Thistle; Lowland League: Broomhill

=== Matches ===
19 January 2024	Clyde	**0–2**	**Aberdeen**	Hamilton
19:45			Miovski 32'; Devlin 57'	Stadium: New Douglas Park; Referee: Euan Anderson

20 January 2024	The Spartans	**1–2**	**Heart of Midlothian**	Edinburgh
12:15	Craigen 64'		Vargas 12'; Kent 90'	Stadium: Ainslie Park; Attendance: 3,500; Referee: Willie Collum

20 January 2024	**Ayr United**	**3–0**	Kelty Hearts	Ayr
15:00	Syla 62'; Rose 79'; McKenzie 90'			Stadium: Somerset Park; Attendance: 1,623; Referee: Colin Steven

20 January 2024	**Kilmarnock**	**2–0**	Dundee	Kilmarnock
15:00	Vassell 1'; Watkins 3'			Stadium: Rugby Park; Attendance: 5,425; Referee: Don Robertson

20 January 2024	**Greenock Morton**	**2–0**	Montrose	Greenock
15:00	Gillespie 10' (pen.); Oakley 51'			Stadium: Cappielow; Attendance: 1,646; Referee: Matthew MacDermid

20 January 2024	**Inverness Caledonian Thistle**	**4–0**	Broomhill	Inverness
15:00	Gilmour 45'; Samuel 62'; Brooks 73', 88'			Stadium: Caledonian Stadium; Attendance: 983; Referee: Craig Napier

20 January 2024	**St Mirren**	**1–0**	Queen of the South	Paisley
15:00	Gogić 71'			Stadium: St Mirren Park; Attendance: 3,425; Referee: Nick Walsh

20 January 2024	**Bonnyrigg Rose**	**2–1**	Falkirk	Bonnyrigg
15:00	Doan 4'; Barrett 90'		Henderson 30'	Stadium: New Dundas Park; Attendance: 1,801; Referee: Graham Grainger

20 January 2024	**Livingston**	**2–1**	Raith Rovers	Livingston
15:00	Brandon 32'; MacKay 82'		Hamilton 5'	Stadium: Almondvale Stadium; Attendance: 2,580; Referee: Grant Irvine

20 January 2024	**Motherwell**	**3–1**	Alloa Athletic	Motherwell
15:00	Spittal 2', 88'; Gent 60'		Sammon 27'	Stadium: Fir Park; Attendance: 4,119; Referee: John Beaton

20 January 2024	Ross County	**0–3**	**Partick Thistle**	Dingwall
15:00			Graham 37'; Robinson 45'; Bannigan 54'	Stadium: Victoria Park; Referee: David Dickinson

20 January 2024	Forfar Athletic	**0–1**	**Hibernian**	Forfar
15:00			Doidge 69'	Stadium: Station Park; Attendance: 4,012; Referee: Ross Hardie

20 January 2024	**Airdrieonians**	**1–0**	St Johnstone	Airdrie
15:00	Todorov 54'			Stadium: Excelsior Stadium; Referee: Kevin Clancy

20 January 2024	Dumbarton	**1–4**	**Rangers**	Dumbarton
17:30	Shiels 88'		Lundstram 35'; Dessers 41'; Tavernier 78' (pen.); Wright 89'	Stadium: Dumbarton Football Stadium; Attendance: 2,020; Referee: Alan Muir

21 January 2024	**Celtic**	**5–0**	Buckie Thistle	Glasgow
16:00	Bernardo 25'; Holm 33'; Furuhashi 41'; Palma 50'; Vata 76'			Stadium: Celtic Park; Referee: Chris Graham

30 January 2024	Brora Rangers	**1–3** (a.e.t.)	**Cove Rangers**	Brora
19:45	Dingwall 13'		Megginson 22', 105'; Scully 120'	Stadium: Dudgeon Park; Attendance: 240; Referee: Colin Whyte

== Fifth round ==
The draw for the fifth round was made on 21 January 2024 during Sportscene on the BBC Scotland channel.

Teams in italics were unknown at the time of the draw.

Teams in bold advanced to the quarter-finals.

Premiership	Championship	League One	League Two
**Aberdeen**; **Celtic**; **Heart of Midlothian**; **Hibernian**; **Kilmarnock**; **Livingston**; Motherwell; **Rangers**; St Mirren	Airdrieonians; Ayr United; **Greenock Morton**; Inverness Caledonian Thistle; Partick Thistle	Cove Rangers	Bonnyrigg Rose

=== Matches ===
9 February 2024	**Greenock Morton**	**2–1**	Motherwell	Greenock
19:30	Paton 35' (o.g.); Oakley 55'		Vale 85'	Stadium: Cappielow; Attendance: 5,167; Referee: John Beaton

10 February 2024	**Kilmarnock**	**2–0**	Cove Rangers	Kilmarnock
15:00	Watkins 45'; Armstrong 81'			Stadium: Rugby Park; Attendance: 4,407; Referee: Grant Irvine

10 February 2024	Inverness Caledonian Thistle	**1–3**	**Hibernian**	Inverness
15:00	Doran 90+5'		Maolida 55'; Boyle 79'; Youan 89'	Stadium: Caledonian Stadium; Attendance: 3,837; Referee: Colin Steven

10 February 2024	**Aberdeen**	**2–0**	Bonnyrigg Rose	Aberdeen
15:00	Miovski 17', 25'			Stadium: Pittodrie Stadium; Attendance: 11,470; Referee: Matthew MacDermid

10 February 2024	Partick Thistle	**2–3** (a.e.t.)	**Livingston**	Glasgow
15:00	McInroy 27'; Fitzpatrick 61'		Nouble 66', 82'; Yengi 120'	Stadium: Firhill Stadium; Attendance: 3,843; Referee: Nick Walsh

10 February 2024	**Rangers**	**2–0**	Ayr United	Glasgow
17:30	Barišić 10'; Silva 77'			Stadium: Ibrox Stadium; Attendance: 43,454; Referee: Willie Collum

11 February 2024	St Mirren	**0–2**	**Celtic**	Paisley
14:00			Furuhashi 15'; Maeda 53'	Stadium: St Mirren Park; Referee: David Dickinson

11 February 2024	Airdrieonians	**1–4**	**Heart of Midlothian**	Airdrie
17:00	Frizzell 34'		Shankland 11', 73'; Vargas 18'; Nieuwenhof 21'	Stadium: Excelsior Stadium; Referee: Steven McLean

== Quarter-finals ==
The draw for the quarter-finals was made on 11 February 2024 at 4:40pm live on BBC One Scotland.

Teams in italics were unknown at the time of the draw.

Teams in bold advanced to the semi-finals.

Premiership	Championship
**Aberdeen**; **Celtic**; **Heart of Midlothian**; Hibernian; Kilmarnock; Livingston; **Rangers**	Greenock Morton

=== Matches ===
9 March 2024	**Aberdeen**	**3–1**	Kilmarnock	Aberdeen
12:15	McGrath 11'; Shinnie 33'; Findlay 66' (o.g.)		Armstrong 41'	Stadium: Pittodrie Stadium; Attendance: 10,879; Referee: John Beaton

10 March 2024	**Celtic**	**4–2**	Livingston	Glasgow
14:30	Maeda 7', 22', 86'; Furuhashi 90'		MacKay 12'; Yengi 54'	Stadium: Celtic Park; Attendance: 33,232; Referee: Willie Collum

10 March 2024	Hibernian	**0–2**	**Rangers**	Edinburgh
17:30			Lundstram 23'; Silva 83'	Stadium: Easter Road; Attendance: 14,297; Referee: Steven McLean

11 March 2024	Greenock Morton	**0–1**	**Heart of Midlothian**	Greenock
19:45			Vargas 86'	Stadium: Cappielow; Attendance: 7,143; Referee: David Dickinson

== Semi-finals ==
The draw for the semi-finals was made on 11 March 2024 live on BBC Scotland following the Greenock Morton v Heart of Midlothian match.

Teams in bold advanced to the final.

Premiership
- Aberdeen
- **Celtic**
- Heart of Midlothian
- **Rangers**

=== Matches ===
20 April 2024	Aberdeen	**3–3** (a.e.t.) (**5–6** p)	**Celtic**	Glasgow
12:30	Miovski 2'; Sokler 90'; MacDonald 119'		Kühn 21'; Forrest 63'; O'Riley 105'	Stadium: Hampden Park; Attendance: 45,385; Referee: Don Robertson
	**Penalties**
	McGrath (penalty scored); MacDonald (penalty scored); Sokler (penalty scored); Duncan (penalty missed); Hoilett (penalty scored); Milne (penalty scored); Phillips (penalty missed)		(penalty scored) Idah; (penalty scored) Palma; (penalty scored) O'Riley; (penalty scored) Bernardo; (penalty missed) Hart; (penalty scored) Johnston; (penalty scored) Iwata

21 April 2024	**Rangers**	**2–0**	Heart of Midlothian	Glasgow
15:00	Dessers 5', 78'			Stadium: Hampden Park; Attendance: 45,256; Referee: Steven McLean

== Final ==
25 May 2024
15:00 BST

Celtic	1–0	Rangers
Idah 90'

Hampden Park, Glasgow
Attendance: 48,556
Referee: Nick Walsh

== Broadcasting ==
The Scottish Cup is broadcast by Viaplay Sports and BBC Scotland. Viaplay Sports has the first two picks of the fourth and fifth rounds, the quarter-finals as well as first pick of one semi-final and airs the final non-exclusively. BBC Scotland broadcast one match per round from the first round onwards and two matches per round from the fourth round to the quarter-finals, as well as one semi-final and the final.

The following matches were selected for live coverage on UK television:

Round	BBC Scotland	Viaplay Sports
First round	University of Stirling v Albion Rovers	
Second round	Musselburgh Athletic v Clyde	
Third round	Dunfermline Athletic v Raith Rovers	
Fourth round	Clyde v Aberdeen; The Spartans v Heart of Midlothian	Dumbarton v Rangers; Celtic v Buckie Thistle
Fifth round	Greenock Morton v Motherwell; Airdrieonians v Heart of Midlothian	Rangers v Ayr United; St Mirren v Celtic
Quarter-finals	Aberdeen v Kilmarnock; Greenock Morton v Heart of Midlothian	Celtic v Livingston; Hibernian v Rangers
Semi-finals	Aberdeen v Celtic	Aberdeen v Celtic; Rangers v Heart of Midlothian
Final	Celtic v Rangers	
