= Lagerbielke family =

Swedish noble family

Lagerbielke Lagerbjelke
- Swedish noble family
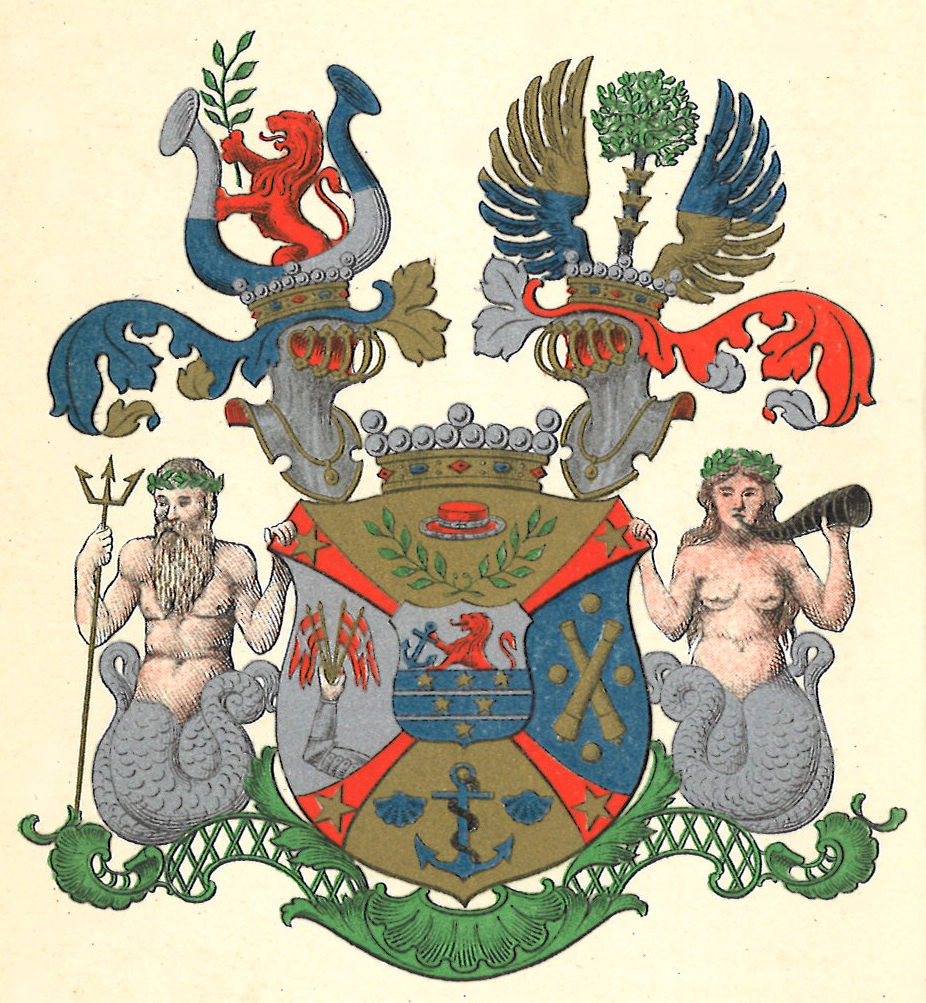
- Coat of arms of the Lagerbielke family, no. 254.
- Current region: Northern Europe (mainly Sweden)

The Lagerbielke family is a Swedish noble family.

== Overview ==
The family's progenitor was a member of the Gothenburg-based Fistulator family.

Notable members include professional footballer Gustaf Lagerbielke, who has played in the Champions League, and represented Sweden at the 2026 FIFA World Cup, and Gustaf Lagerbielke (1777–1837), who was a member of the Swedish Academy.

Gustaf Lagerbielke (born 2000) is, following his grandfather's passing in 2022, the head of the baronial branch of the family, registered under number 254 in the House of Nobility. He holds the title of friherre, which corresponds to the English title of baron.

== Comital branch ==
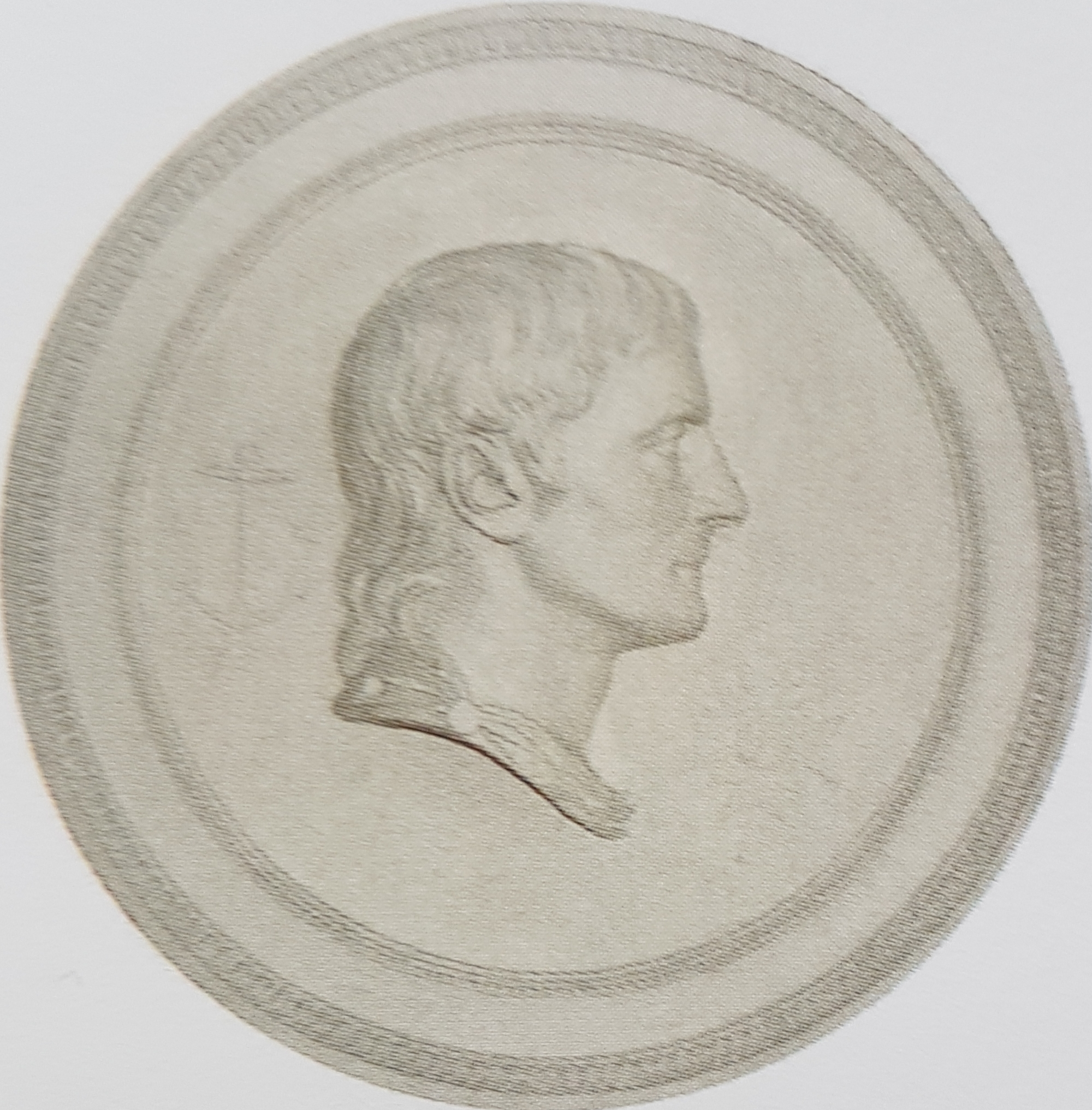
Johan Gustaf Lagerbielke

The comital branch of the family is spelled with a 'j' (Lagerbjelke) instead of an 'i' and is registered under number 115 in the House of Nobility. It was created in 1809 for Johan Gustaf Lagerbjelke. Its current head is Count Johan Lagerbjelke and his eldest son, footballer Gustaf Lagerbielke, is the heir apparent to the headship of this branch.

== Notable members ==
- Johan Lagerbielke (1667–1732), admirality councillor
- Axel Lagerbielke (1702–1782), admiral, 1st Baron
- Johan Lagerbjelke (1745–1812), Chief Admiral, 1st Count
- Axel Lagerbjelke (1775–1832), Lieutenant General, 2nd Count
- Gustaf Lagerbjelke (1777-1837), Court Chancellor, Minister
- Johan Lagerbielke (1778–1856), Maritime minister
- Gustaf Lagerbjelke (1817–1895), the last Lord Marshal, governor of Södermanland, 3rd Count
- Gustaf Lagerbjelke (1860–1937), MP, Chairman of National Debt Council, 4th Count
- Gustaf Lagerbjelke (1938–2022), Judge of Appeal, LL.D., 7th Count
- Gustaf Lagerbielke (footballer) (born 2000), Swedish footballer, 11th Baron
- Lucie Lagerbielke (1865–1931), Swedish artist and writer
