= Gustaf Lagerbielke (footballer) =

Swedish footballer (born 2000)

- Lagerbielke with Sweden in 2026

Personal information
- Full name: Gustaf Johan Lagerbielke
- Date of birth: 10 April 2000 (age 26)
- Place of birth: Stockholm, Sweden
- Height: 1.93 m (6 ft 4 in)
- Position: Centre-back

Team information
- Current team: Braga
- Number: 14

Youth career
- IFK Stocksund
- –2017: FC Djursholm
- 2017–2018: AIK

Senior career*
| Years | Team | Apps | (Gls) |
| 2017 | FC Djursholm | 5 | (0) |
| 2018 | AIK | 0 | (0) |
| 2018 | → Sollentuna FK (loan) | 2 | (0) |
| 2019–2020 | Sollentuna FK | 46 | (1) |
| 2021 | Västerås SK | 15 | (3) |
| 2021–2023 | IF Elfsborg | 24 | (2) |
| 2022 | → Degerfors IF (loan) | 14 | (3) |
| 2023–2025 | Celtic | 7 | (0) |
| 2024–2025 | → Twente (loan) | 22 | (1) |
| 2025– | Braga | 35 | (2) |

International career^{‡}
| 2017 | Sweden U17 | 1 | (0) |
| 2017–2021 | Sweden U19 | 11 | (0) |
| 2023– | Sweden | 17 | (2) |
- * Club domestic league appearances and goals as of 22:15, 25 October 2026 (UTC) ‡ National team caps and goals as of 23:45, 17 November 2026 (UTC)

Gustaf Johan Lagerbielke (Swedish pronunciation: [ˈɡɵ̂sːtav ˈlɑ̂ːgɛ(r)ˌbjɛlkɛ]; born 10 April 2000) is a Swedish nobleman and 11th Baron Lagerbielke and professional footballer who plays as a centre-back for Primeira Liga side Braga and the Sweden national team.

== Early life ==
Gustaf Lagerbielke grew up just outside Stockholm, in Djursholm, one of the most affluent areas in Sweden.

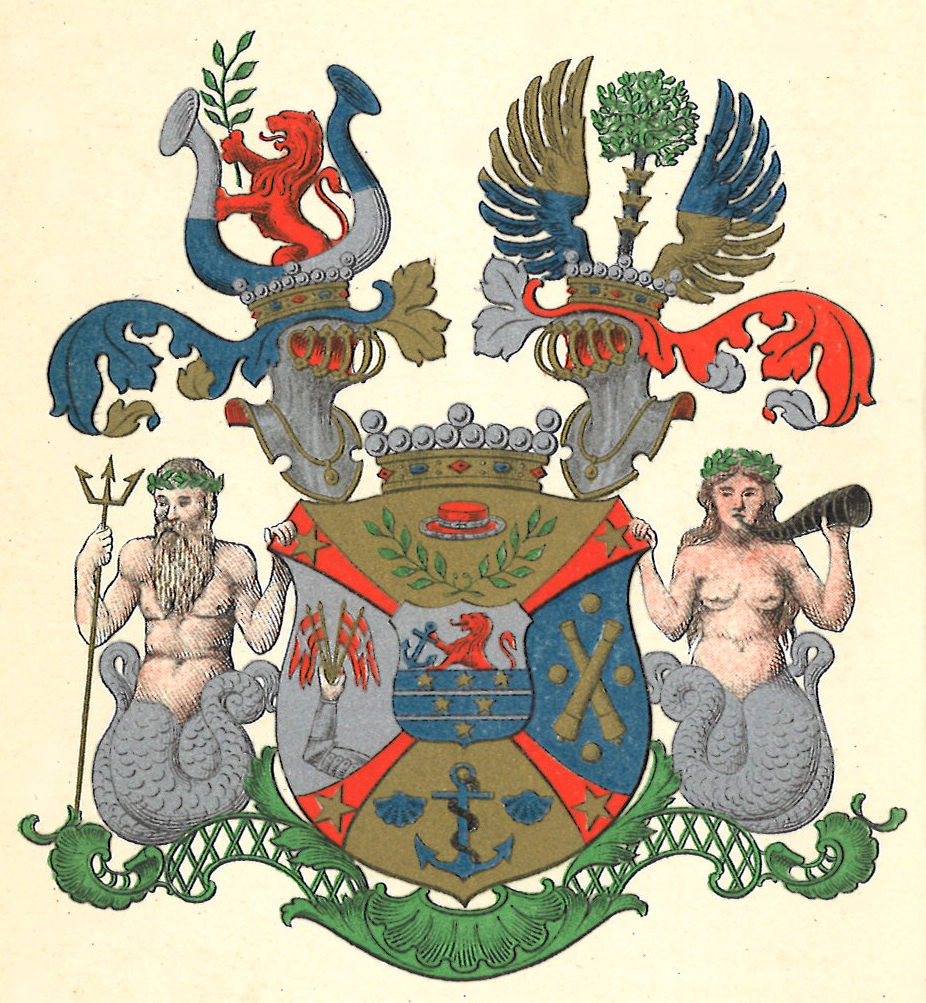
Coat of arms of the Lagerbielke family, no. 254.

Lagerbielke belongs to the Lagerbielke family, a Swedish noble family registered under number 254 in the House of Nobility. He holds the title of friherre, which corresponds to the English title of baron. Following his paternal grandfather's passing in 2022, he became the head of the baronial branch of the family. He is also the heir apparent to the headship of the countly branch of the Lagerbjelke family registered under number 115 in the House of Nobility.

Lagerbielke's father is Johan Lagerbjelke, the 8:th Count Lagerbjelke, a public speaker and negotiation expert, while his mother is entrepreneur Katarina Waldenström. His maternal grandfather, Jan Waldenström (1937–2026), played for IF Elfsborg.

== Club career ==
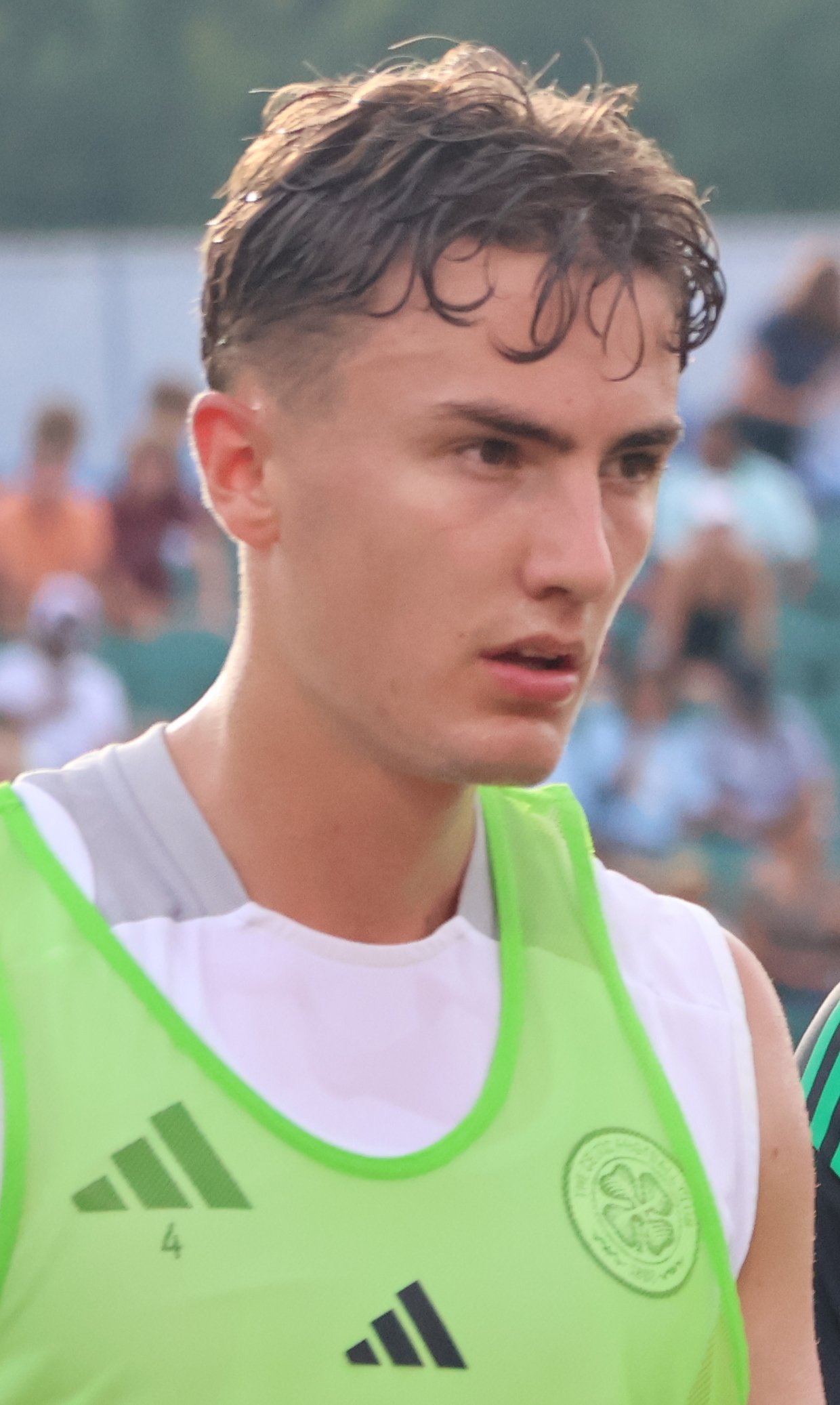
Lagerbielke with Celtic in 2024

Lagerbielke played for AIK, Sollentuna FK, Västerås SK, IF Elfsborg and Degerfors IF in Sweden. In August 2023, he joined Scottish club Celtic, by signing a contract until 2028.

Lagerbielke made his Old Firm Derby debut on 3 September 2023, notably winning a goal-cancelling foul to help Celtic to a 1–0 win away to Rangers. Later that year, on 13 December, he scored his first UEFA Champions League goal, securing a 2–1 victory over Feyenoord, to seal his club's first win in 15 matches in that competition, and first home win in ten years.

On 27 August 2024, Lagerbielke joined Twente in the Netherlands on a season-long loan.

On 8 July 2025, Lagerbielke departed Celtic to join Primeira Liga side S.C. Braga on a permanent deal.

== International career ==
Lagerbielke made his debut for Sweden's national team on 12 January 2023 in a friendly match against Iceland. On 12 October 2023, he scored his first international goal in a 3–1 victory over Moldova. He scored a goal in Sweden's winning game in the play off finals for the 2026 World Cup against Poland on 31 March 2026.

On 12 May 2026, Lagerbielke was named in the Sweden squad for the 2026 FIFA World Cup. At the World Cup, Lagerbielke played in all four games as Sweden was eliminated in the Round of 32 by France.

== Career statistics ==
=== Club ===
As of match played 29 October 2026

Appearances and goals by club, season and competition
| Club | Season | League | | | National cup (Note: Includes Svenska Cupen, Scottish Cup, KNVB Cup, Taça de Portugal) | | League cup (Note: Includes Scottish League Cup, Taça da Liga) | | Europe | | Total | |
| Club | Season | Division | Apps | Goals | Apps | Goals | Apps | Goals | Apps | Goals | Apps | Goals |
|---|---|---|---|---|---|---|---|---|---|---|---|---|
| FC Djursholm | 2017 | Division 4 | 5 | 0 | — | | — | | — | | 5 | 0 |
| Sollentuna | 2018 | Division 1 Norra | 2 | 0 | — | | — | | — | | 2 | 0 |
| Sollentuna | 2019 | Division 1 Norra | 14 | 1 | 4 | 1 | — | | — | | 18 | 2 |
| Sollentuna | 2020 | Ettan Norra | 29 | 0 | 1 | 0 | — | | — | | 30 | 0 |
| Sollentuna | Total | | 45 | 1 | 5 | 1 | — | | — | | 50 | 2 |
| Västerås | 2021 | Superettan | 15 | 3 | 4 | 1 | — | | — | | 19 | 4 |
| IF Elfsborg | 2021 | Allsvenskan | 2 | 0 | 2 | 1 | — | | 1 (Note: Appearances in UEFA Conference League) | 0 | 5 | 1 |
| IF Elfsborg | 2022 | Allsvenskan | 6 | 0 | 0 | 0 | — | | 0 | 0 | 6 | 0 |
| IF Elfsborg | 2023 | Allsvenskan | 16 | 2 | 0 | 0 | — | | — | | 16 | 2 |
| IF Elfsborg | Total | | 24 | 2 | 2 | 1 | — | | 1 | 0 | 27 | 3 |
| Degerfors IF (loan) | 2022 | Allsvenskan | 14 | 3 | — | | — | | — | | 14 | 3 |
| Celtic | 2023–24 | Scottish Premiership | 7 | 0 | 0 | 0 | 1 | 0 | 2 (Note: Appearances in UEFA Champions League) | 1 | 10 | 1 |
| Twente (loan) | 2024–25 | Eredivisie | 22 | 1 | 2 | 0 | — | | 8 (Note: Appearances in UEFA Europa League) | 1 | 32 | 2 |
| Braga | 2025–26 | Primeira Liga | 28 | 2 | 3 | 1 | 3 | 1 | 19 | 0 | 53 | 4 |
| Braga | 2026–27 | Primeira Liga | 7 | 0 | 0 | 0 | 1 | 0 | 5 | 0 | 13 | 0 |
| Braga | Total | | 35 | 2 | 3 | 1 | 4 | 1 | 24 | 0 | 66 | 4 |
| Career total | | | 170 | 12 | 16 | 4 | 5 | 1 | 35 | 2 | 234 | 19 |

=== International ===
As of match played 17 November 2026

Appearances and goals by national team and year
| National team | Year | Apps | Goals |
|---|---|---|---|
| Sweden | 2023 | 2 | 1 |
| Sweden | 2024 | 0 | 0 |
| Sweden | 2025 | 5 | 0 |
| Sweden | 2026 | 10 | 1 |
| Total | | 17 | 2 |

Scores and results list Sweden's goal tally first, score column indicates score after each Lagerbielke goal.

List of international goals scored by Gustaf Lagerbielke
| No. | Date | Venue | Opponent | Score | Result | Competition |
|---|---|---|---|---|---|---|
| 1. | 12 October 2023 | Friends Arena, Solna, Sweden | Moldova | 2–0 | 3–1 | Friendly |
| 2. | 31 March 2026 | Strawberry Arena, Solna, Sweden | Poland | 2–1 | 3–2 | 2026 FIFA World Cup qualification |

== Honours ==
Celtic

- Scottish Premiership: 2023–24

Individual

- Allsvenskan Defender of the Year: 2023
