= 2022–23 South of Scotland Football League =

South of Scotland Football League
- Season: 2022-23
- Dates: 30 July 2022 – 8 May 2023
- Champions: Abbey Vale
- Matches: 132
- Goals: 616 (4.67 per match)
- Biggest home win: Mid-Annandale 18–0 Wigtown & Bladnoch (11 March 2023)
- Biggest away win: Wigtown & Bladnoch 0–9 Creetown (5 November 2022)
- Highest scoring: Mid-Annandale 18–0 Wigtown & Bladnoch (11 March 2023)
- Longest winning run: 8 matches: Creetown
- Longest unbeaten run: 20 matches: Creetown
- Longest winless run: 10 matches: Wigtown & Bladnoch
- Longest losing run: 9 matches: 3 teams
- All statistics correct as of 8 May 2023.

The 2022–23 South of Scotland Football League was the 77th season of the South of Scotland Football League, and the 9th season as part of the sixth tier of the Scottish football pyramid system. The season started on 30 July 2022 and ended on 8 May 2023. St Cuthbert Wanderers were the reigning champions.

The title was won for the first time by Abbey Vale, winning their last seven games of the season to overhaul long-time league leaders Creetown, who were also chasing a first league title. Abbey Vale were ineligible for promotion however, as they do not hold an SFA club licence. As champions, they will enter the 2023–24 Scottish Cup at the preliminary-round stage.

== Teams ==
Location of teams in 2022–23 South of Scotland Football League

The following team changed divisions after the 2021–22 season.

=== From South of Scotland League ===
Transferred to West of Scotland Football League

- Threave Rovers

Team	Location	Home ground	Capacity	Seats	Floodlit
Abbey Vale	New Abbey	Maryfield Park	1,000	0	No
Caledonian Braves reserves	Motherwell	Alliance Park	500	100	Yes
Creetown	Creetown	Castlecary Park	1,000	0	Yes
Lochar Thistle	Dumfries	Wilson Park	1,000	0	No
Lochmaben	Lochmaben	Whitehills Park	1,000	0	No
Mid-Annandale	Lockerbie	New King Edward Park	1,000	0	Yes
Newton Stewart ^{[SFA]}	Newton Stewart	Blairmount Park	1,500	0	Yes
Nithsdale Wanderers	Sanquhar	Lorimer Park	1,000	0	Yes
St Cuthbert Wanderers ^{[SFA]}	Kirkcudbright	St Mary's Park	2,000	0	Yes
Stranraer reserves	Stranraer	Stair Park	4,178	1,830	Yes
Upper Annandale	Moffat	Moffat Academy	1,000	0	No
Wigtown & Bladnoch ^{[SFA]}	Wigtown	Trammondford Park	888	0	Yes

^{SFA} Club with an SFA licence eligible to participate in the Lowland League promotion play-off should they win the league.

Caledonian Braves reserves and Stranraer reserves are ineligible for promotion.

== League table ==
Pos	Team	Pld	W	D	L	GF	GA	GD	Pts	Qualification
1	Abbey Vale (C)	22	19	1	2	100	24	+76	58	Ineligible for the Lowland League play-off
2	Creetown	22	17	4	1	66	17	+49	55	
3	Lochar Thistle	22	15	4	3	75	30	+45	49	
4	Stranraer reserves	22	14	1	7	66	36	+30	43	Ineligible for promotion
5	Newton Stewart	22	13	1	8	57	48	+9	40	
6	Mid-Annandale	22	11	5	6	62	38	+24	38	
7	St Cuthbert Wanderers	22	8	2	12	45	57	−12	26	
8	Upper Annandale	22	5	4	13	33	56	−23	19	
9	Lochmaben	22	5	2	15	36	60	−24	17	
10	Nithsdale Wanderers	22	5	1	16	26	79	−53	16	
11	Caledonian Braves reserves	22	4	2	16	37	70	−33	14	Ineligible for promotion
12	Wigtown & Bladnoch	22	2	1	19	13	101	−88	7	

Rules for classification: 1) Points; 2) Goal difference; 3) Number of goals scored
(C) Champions

== Results ==
Home \ Away	ABB	CAL	CRE	LOT	LOC	MID	NEW	NIT	SCW	STR	UPA	WIG
Abbey Vale	—	8–2	0–3	1–1	4–1	3–0	9–2	9–1	2–1	3–1	2–0 (Note: Match played at Dumfries High School.)	10–0
Caledonian Braves reserves	0–2	—	0–1	0–7	2–1	2–2	1–6	2–3	5–3	0–2	7–0	5–0
Creetown	3–0	4–1	—	2–0	4–0 (Note: Match played at Blairmount Park, Newton Stewart.)	1–1	3–1	4–0	4–0	1–4 (Note: Match played at Blairmount Park, Newton Stewart.)	3–2	6–1 (Note: Match played at Stranraer Academy 3G.)
Lochar Thistle	2–5	7–2 (Note: Match played at North West Community Campus.)	1–1	—	5–2	3–0	2–0	5–1 (Note: Match played at North West Community Campus.)	3–1	5–2	3–0	3–0 (Note: Match played at North West Community Campus.)
Lochmaben	0–4	1–0	3–4	0–4	—	0–1	2–0	2–1	2–3	1–3	1–1	6–0
Mid-Annandale	2–5	5–0	0–0	1–7	2–1	—	3–1	2–1	2–2 (Note: Match played at Galabank, Annan.)	1–5	3–0	18–0
Newton Stewart	1–5	6–3	2–2	6–5	4–3	0–3	—	5–0	1–3	3–0	2–1	2–1
Nithsdale Wanderers	2–6 (Note: Match played at North West Community Campus, Dumfries, as Lorimer Park was unplayable.)	2–1	0–2	1–5	5–1	1–3	0–5 (Note: Match played at North West Community Campus, Dumfries.)	—	0–4	3–9	3–2	2–0
St Cuthbert Wanderers	0–6	2–2	1–2	1–2	6–3	1–7	1–2	5–0	—	2–3	2–1	3–1
Stranraer reserves	0–3 (Note: Match played at Stranraer Academy 3G.)	4–0	0–2	2–3	2–2	3–1 (Note: Match played at Stranraer Academy 3G.)	0–1	6–0 (Note: Match played at Stranraer Academy 3G.)	5–0	—	6–3	2–1 (Note: Match played at Blairmount Park, Newton Stewart.)
Upper Annandale	2–5 (Note: Match played at New King Edward Park, Lockerbie.)	3–2	0–5	1–1 (Note: Match played at New King Edward Park, Lockerbie.)	4–2	1–1 (Note: Match played at Dumfries High School, Dumfries.)	0–5 (Note: Match played at Raydale Park, Gretna.)	0–0	2–0	1–2 (Note: Match played at New King Edward Park, Lockerbie.)	—	5–1
Wigtown & Bladnoch	0–8	1–0 (Note: Match played at Blairmount Park, Newton Stewart.)	0–9 (Note: Match played at Blairmount Park, Newton Stewart.)	1–1	1–2 (Note: Match played at Blairmount Park, Newton Stewart.)	1–4	1–2	1–0	2–4	0–5	0–4	—

Legend: Blue = home team win; Yellow = draw; Red = away team win.
