= Kwon Hyeok-kyu =

South Korean footballer (born 2001)

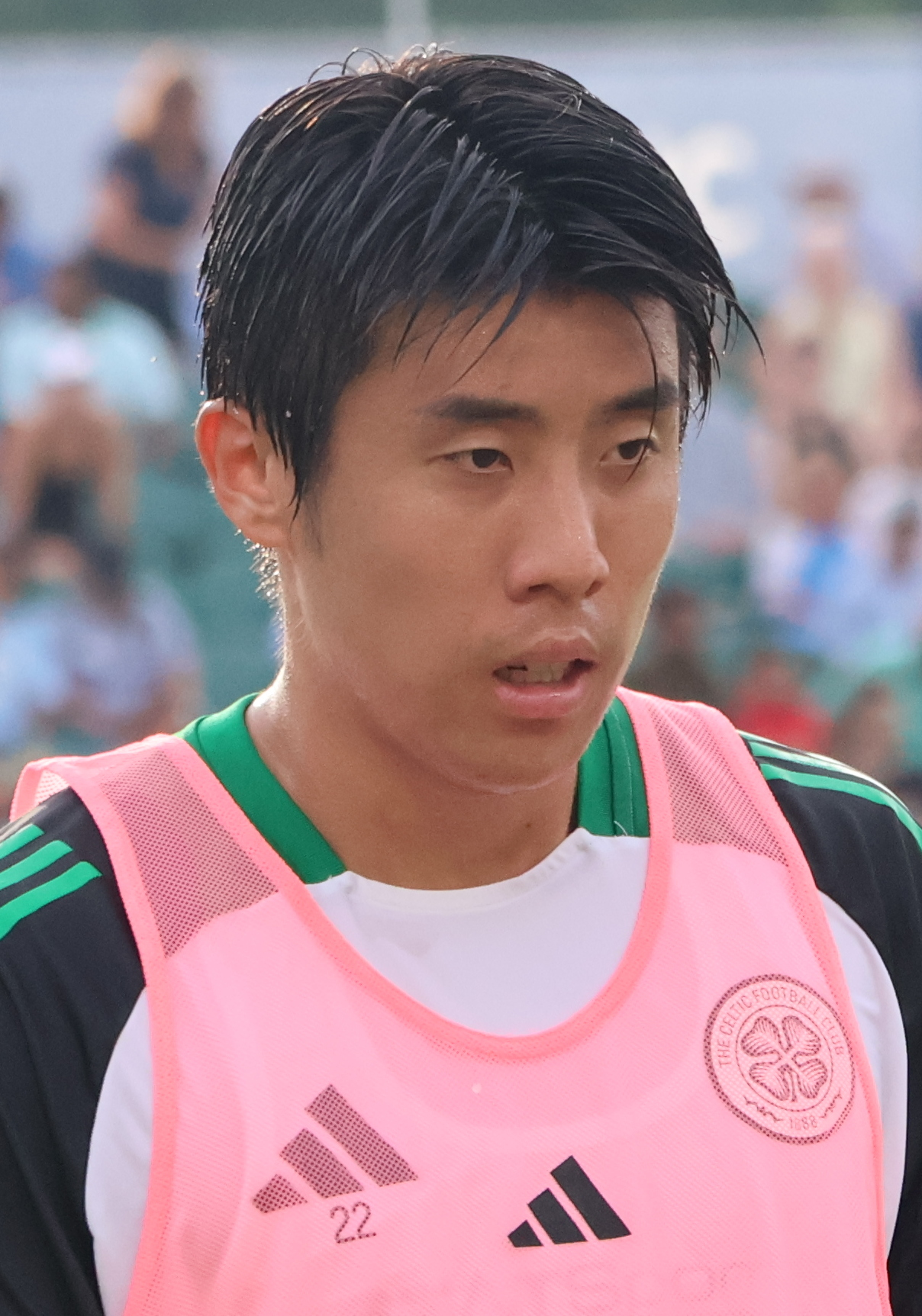
- Kwon training with Celtic in 2024

Personal information
- Date of birth: 13 March 2001 (age 25)
- Place of birth: Busan, South Korea
- Height: 1.92 m (6 ft 4 in)
- Position: Defensive midfielder

Team information
- Current team: Karlsruher SC
- Number: 5

Youth career
- 2010–2019: Busan IPark

Senior career*
Years	Team	Apps	(Gls)
2019–2023	Busan IPark	43	(3)
2021–2022	→ Gimcheon Sangmu (draft)	33	(0)
2023–2025	Celtic	0	(0)
2024	→ St Mirren (loan)	8	(0)
2024–2025	→ Hibernian (loan)	21	(0)
2025–2026	Nantes	12	(0)
2026–	Karlsruher SC	8	(0)

International career^{‡}
2015	South Korea U14	4	(0)
2016–2018	South Korea U17	14	(2)
2019	South Korea U20	7	(3)
2021–2023	South Korea U23	14	(0)
2025–	South Korea	2	(0)
- * Club domestic league appearances and goals as of 9 May 2026 ‡ National team caps and goals as of 31 March 2026

- Kwon Hyeok-kyu
- Hangul: 권혁규
- Hanja: 權赫圭
- RR: Gwon Hyeokgyu
- MR: Kwŏn Hyŏkkyu

Kwon Hyeok-kyu (Korean: 권혁규; born 13 March 2001) is a South Korean professional footballer who plays as a defensive midfielder for 2. Bundesliga club Karlsruher SC and the South Korea national team.

== Club career ==
=== Busan IPark ===
Kwon started playing football at under-12 team of K League club Busan IPark in 2010, playing for Busan's youth teams for 10 years. On 16 July 2019, Kwon was promoted to Busan's senior team. On 14 September, he made his professional debut as a starting central midfielder in a K League 2 match against Jeonnam Dragons. Busan was promoted to the K League 1 at the end of the season, and so he became a first division player the next season.

=== Gimcheon Sangmu ===
In April 2021, Kwon was enlisted in military team Gimcheon Sangmu, performing his mandatory military service for one and a half years. He won the K League 2 title as he played as a defensive midfielder for Sangmu that year. On 7 September 2022, he returned to Busan by being discharged from the military service.

=== Celtic ===
Kwon received an offer from Scottish Premiership club Celtic in December 2022, and their deal was done in July 2023. On 24 July, Celtic announced that he had signed on a five-year deal for an undisclosed fee. He said his ambition to become Celtic's best player and advance to the Bundesliga or the Premier League in an interview with Busan Ilbo before the transfer. His interview embarrassed Celtic supporters, but there was also a positive view that he was an honest player who set a clear goal.

Kwon had failed to make his debut at Celtic and was loaned to St Mirren from January to May 2024 and Hibernian in the 2024–25 season. At the two Scottish clubs, he made 29 Premiership appearances, but had a hard time with two injuries.

=== Nantes ===
On 25 July 2025, Kwon signed a three-year contract with Ligue 1 club Nantes. Francisco Calvete, the Nantes performance manager and former Busan fitness coach, recommended him to the club as a replacement for Pedro Chirivella or Douglas Augusto. On 17 August, he made his Ligue 1 debut as a starter in the club's first match against Paris Saint-Germain, which ended in a 1–0 loss. He got opportunities under manager Luís Castro for about half a year, but was excluded from the squad after Castro was sacked for poor results.

=== Karlsruher SC ===
On 2 February 2026, Kwon moved to 2. Bundesliga club Karlsruher SC.

== International career ==
On 30 September 2024, Kwon earned his first call-up to the South Korea national team. On 18 November 2025, he made his international debut in a 1–0 win against Ghana.

== Career statistics ==
=== Club ===
As of 9 May 2026

Appearances and goals by club, season and competition
Club	Season	League			National cup (Note: Includes Korean FA Cup, Scottish Cup)		League cup (Note: Includes Scottish League Cup)		Total	
Club	Season	Division	Apps	Goals	Apps	Goals	Apps	Goals	Apps	Goals
Busan IPark	2019	K League 2	2	0	0	0	—		2	0
Busan IPark	2020	K League 1	16	1	1	0	—		17	1
Busan IPark	2022	K League 2	5	0	2	0	—		7	0
Busan IPark	2023	K League 2	20	2	0	0	—		20	2
Busan IPark	Total		43	3	3	0	—		46	3
Gimcheon Sangmu (draft)	2021	K League 2	14	0	1	0	—		15	0
Gimcheon Sangmu (draft)	2022	K League 1	19	0	0	0	—		19	0
Gimcheon Sangmu (draft)	Total		33	0	1	0	—		34	0
St Mirren (loan)	2023–24	Scottish Premiership	8	0	1	0	0	0	9	0
Hibernian (loan)	2024–25	Scottish Premiership	21	0	1	0	0	0	22	0
Nantes	2025–26	Ligue 1	12	0	0	0	—		12	0
Karlsruher SC	2025–26	2. Bundesliga	8	0	0	0	—		8	0
Career total			125	3	6	0	0	0	131	3

== Honours ==
Gimcheon Sangmu

- K League 2: 2021
