= Josh Peters (footballer) =

Scottish footballer (born 1998)

Joshua Peters
Personal information
- Date of birth: 4 September 1996 (age 30)
- Place of birth: Aviemore, Scotland
- Position: Forward

Team information
- Current team: Buckie Thistle

Youth career
- Inverness Caledonian Thistle
- 2011–2016: Strathspey Thistle
- 2016: Hibernian

Senior career*
Years	Team	Apps	(Gls)
2016–2017	Forfar Athletic	33	(11)
2017–2018	Livingston	0	(0)
2017–2018	→ Forfar Athletic (loan)	19	(3)
2018	Forfar Athletic	12	(1)
2018–2019	Queen's Park	12	(2)
2019–2020	Stirling Albion	10	(4)
2020–2022	Elgin City	48	(2)
2022–	Buckie Thistle		
- * Club domestic league appearances and goals as of 17:00, 17 September 2022 (UTC)

Josh Peters (born 4 September 1996) is a Scottish professional footballer who plays as a forward for Lowland League East club Buckie Thistle.

== Club career ==
=== Youth career ===
Peters started his career in the Inverness Caledonian Thistle youth ranks before transferring to Strathspey Thistle and then Hibernian.

=== Senior career ===
In 2020, Peters signed his first professional contract with Forfar Athletic and went on to score 11 times in 33 appearances for the Loons, which caught the attention of several bigger clubs in Scotland.

His good form earned him a move to Livingston in 2017. Peters struggled to break into the first team and returned to Forfar Athletic on loan.

Peters re-signed for the Loons permanently in January 2018. He struggled to find the goalscoring form from his first spell at Station Park and was soon on the move again. The forward signed for Queen's Park in the summer of 2018 and scored twice in 12 appearances for the Spiders before departing the club after one season.

Spells at Stirling Albion and Elgin City followed over the next four years before Peters signed for Highland Football League side Buckie Thistle in 2022.
