= 2015–16 West of Scotland Super League Premier Division =

McBookie.com West of Scotland Super League Premier Division
- Season: 2015–16
- Champions: Auchinleck Talbot
- Relegated: Shettleston; Petershill; Irvine Meadow
- Matches: 132
- Goals: 423 (3.2 per match)

The 2015–16 West of Scotland Super League Premier Division was the fourteenth Super League Premier Division competition since the formation of the Scottish Junior Football Association, West Region in 2002. The winners of this competition are eligible to enter round one of the 2016–17 Scottish Cup. The two last placed sides are relegated to the Super League First Division. The third-bottom placed side will enter the West Region league play-off, a two-legged tie against the third placed side in the Super League First Division, to decide the final promotion/relegation spot.

Auchinleck Talbot won the championship on 25 May 2016, claiming a record fifth West of Scotland Super Premier League title.

== Member clubs for the 2015–16 season ==
Auchinleck Talbot were the reigning champions.

Pollok and Shettleston were promoted from the Super League First Division, replacing the automatically relegated Clydebank and Cumnock Juniors.

Kirkintilloch Rob Roy claimed a third promotion spot after defeating Shotts Bon Accord in the West Region League play-off.

Club	Location	Ground	Manager	Finishing position 2014–15
Arthurlie	Barrhead	Dunterlie Park	Steve Kerrigan	9th
Auchinleck Talbot	Auchinleck	Beechwood Park	Tommy Sloan	Champions
Beith Juniors	Beith	Bellsdale Park	John Millar	6th
Glenafton Athletic	New Cumnock	Loch Park	Craig McEwan	4th
Hurlford United	Hurlford	Blair Park	Darren Henderson	2nd
Irvine Meadow	Irvine	Meadow Park	Davie Greig	3rd
Kilbirnie Ladeside	Kilbirnie	Valefield Park	Stephen Swift	8th
Kirkintilloch Rob Roy	Cumbernauld	Guy's Meadow ^{1}	Stuart Maxwell	Super League First Division, 3rd
Petershill	Springburn, Glasgow	Petershill Park	Willie Paterson	5th
Pollok	Newlands, Glasgow	Newlandsfield Park	Tony McInally	Super League First Division, 1st
Shettleston	Shettleston, Glasgow	Greenfield Park	Reon Juskowiak	Super League First Division, 2nd
Troon	Troon	Portland Park	Gordon Burns	7th

^{1} Groundsharing with Cumbernauld United F.C.

=== Managerial changes ===
Club	Outgoing manager	Manner of departure	Date of vacancy	Position in table	Incoming manager	Date of appointment
Troon	Jim Kirkwood	Resigned	10 August 2015	Close season	Gordon Burns	10 August 2015
Irvine Meadow	Stevie Rankin	Sacked	22 December 2015	12th	Davie Greig	6 January 2016
Shettleston	Hugh Kelly	Resigned	18 January 2016	9th	Reon Juskowiak	18 January 2016
Arthurlie	Robert Downs	Resigned	23 January 2016	11th	Steve Kerrigan	24 January 2016
Irvine Meadow	Davie Greig	Resigned	End of season	12th	Gareth Turner & Michael Wardrope	25 May 2016

== League table ==
Pos	Team	Pld	W	D	L	GF	GA	GD	Pts	Qualification or relegation
1	Auchinleck Talbot (C)	22	14	3	5	42	17	+25	45	Qualification for 2016–17 Scottish Cup
2	Hurlford United	22	12	5	5	40	22	+18	41	
3	Kilbirnie Ladeside	22	12	4	6	42	25	+17	40	
4	Troon	22	12	1	9	51	31	+20	37	
5	Pollok	22	10	4	8	38	31	+7	34	
6	Glenafton Athletic	22	9	4	9	31	35	−4	31	
7	Beith Juniors	22	8	6	8	34	40	−6	30	
8	Kirkintilloch Rob Roy	22	7	6	9	27	39	−12	27	
9	Arthurlie	22	7	5	10	35	40	−5	26	
10	Shettleston (R)	22	7	4	11	26	32	−6	25	Qualification for West Region League play-off
11	Petershill (R)	22	5	6	11	27	50	−23	21	Relegation to Super League First Division
12	Irvine Meadow (R)	22	3	4	15	30	61	−31	13	Relegation to Super League First Division

Updated to match(es) played on 6 June 2016. Source: SJFA West Region
Rules for classification: 1) points; 2) goal difference; 3) number of goals scored.
(C) Champions; (R) Relegated

== Results ==
Home \ Away	ART	AUC	BEI	GLE	HUR	IVM	KLB	KRR	PSH	PLK	SHE	TRO
Arthurlie		0–2	2–0	1–2	0–2	3–2	2–4	3–1	2–3	3–1	2–2	3–2
Auchinleck Talbot	2–2		1–0	2–0	4–3	3–0	0–1	2–0	4–1	4–1	2–0	2–0
Beith Juniors	4–1	2–2		3–1	0–0	3–0	0–3	2–2	2–2	1–1	2–1	3–2
Glenafton Athletic	2–2	0–2	1–3		3–2	4–2	2–0	0–2	1–0	2–4	1–2	1–1
Hurlford United	3–1	0–1	4–0	1–1		1–1	1–0	1–2	4–1	2–1	3–1	3–1
Irvine Meadow	0–1	0–1	7–2	1–2	0–3		1–0	2–2	2–2	1–1	2–3	2–6
Kilbirnie Ladeside	0–0	2–1	1–2	3–2	1–1	6–2		4–0	4–1	1–1	3–0	0–4
Kirkintilloch Rob Roy	1–1	2–0	1–2	0–2	0–1	3–2	1–4		1–1	3–2	2–2	2–1
Petershill	1–0	0–6	1–0	1–1	1–2	0–2	1–1	1–1		1–5	3–1	4–2
Pollok	1–3	1–0	4–2	3–0	1–1	3–1	2–1	0–1	2–0		0–1	0–2
Shettleston	2–1	0–0	0–0	0–2	0–1	4–0	1–2	2–0	4–1	0–1		0–3
Troon	3–2	2–1	3–1	0–1	2–1	8–0	0–1	4–0	3–1	1–3	1–0	

Updated to match(es) played on 6 June 2016. Source: SJFA West Region
Legend: Blue = home team win; Yellow = draw; Red = away team win.

=== West Region League play-off ===
Kilwinning Rangers, who finished third in the Super League First Division, defeated Shettleston 5–3 on aggregate in the West Region League play-off. Kilwinning will replace Shettleston in the 2016–17 West of Scotland Super League Premier Division.

8 June 2016
19:30

Shettleston	3 – 2	Kilwinning Rangers

Greenfield Park, Glasgow
Referee: Craig Napier
10 June 2016
19:30

Kilwinning Rangers	3 – 0	Shettleston

Abbey Park, Kilwinning
Referee: Steven Reid
