= 2016–17 Scottish Cup =

2016–17 William Hill Scottish Cup
Tournament details
- Country: Scotland
- Teams: 93

Final positions
- Champions: Celtic
- Runners-up: Aberdeen

Tournament statistics
- Matches played: 105
- Goals scored: 370 (3.52 per match)
- Top goal scorer(s): Wayne McIntosh & David Gormley (8 goals)
- All statistics correct as of 27 May 2017.

The 2016–17 Scottish Cup was the 132nd season of Scotland's most prestigious football knockout competition. The tournament was sponsored by bookmaker William Hill in what was the sixth season of a nine-year partnership, after contract negotiations saw the initial five-year contract extended for an additional four years in October 2015.

The defending champions were Hibernian, who defeated Rangers in the 2016 final, but they were eliminated in the semi-finals by Aberdeen.

Celtic beat Aberdeen 2–1 in the final to complete a domestic treble without losing a game in any domestic competition.

== Media coverage ==
From round four onwards, selected matches from the Scottish Cup are broadcast live in the UK and Ireland by BBC Scotland and Sky Sports. BBC Scotland has the option to show one tie per round with Sky Sports showing two ties per round with one replay; also, Sky Sports show both semi-finals live with one also on BBC Scotland & both channels screen the final live.

== Calendar ==
The calendar for the 2016–17 Scottish Cup qualifying rounds, as announced by Scottish Football Association.

Round	Main date	Number of fixtures	Clubs	New Entries
Preliminary round 1	13 August 2016	5	93 → 88	10
Preliminary round 2	3 September 2016	6	88 → 82	7
First round	24 September 2016	18	82 → 64	30
Second round	22 October 2016	16	64 → 48	14
Third round	26 November 2016	16	48 → 32	16
Fourth round	21 January 2017	16	32 → 16	16
Fifth round	11 February 2017	8	16 → 8	None
Quarter-finals	4 March 2017	4	8 → 4	None
Semi-finals	22 & 23 April 2017	2	4 → 2	None
Final	27 May 2017	1	2 → 1	None

== Preliminary rounds ==
The draw for the preliminary rounds took place at the Coldstream Museum on Monday 18 July 2016.

17 clubs were involved in the draw, of which seven received a bye to the second preliminary round, while the other 10 entered the first preliminary round. The teams competing in these rounds were made up of teams from the East of Scotland Football League (3), South of Scotland Football League (5), North Caledonian Football League (1), Scottish Junior Football Association (6) and the Scottish Amateur Football Association (2).

There were three parts to the draw. The first part determined which seven clubs, from the 10 eligible, would receive a bye to the second preliminary round. The three clubs which did not receive a bye into the second preliminary round entered in the first preliminary round. Five ties were drawn in the first preliminary round to be played on Saturday, 13 August 2016. The final part of the draw saw six ties drawn in the second preliminary round to be played on Saturday, 3 September 2016.

=== Preliminary round 1 ===
==== Draw ====
Teams in Bold advanced to the first round.

Clubs eligible for a bye	Clubs participating in the First Preliminary Round Draw
1. **Banks O’Dee**; 2. Burntisland Shipyard; 3. Coldstream; 4. Edusport Academy; 5. **Girvan**; 6. Glasgow University; 7. Golspie Sutherland; 8. **Linlithgow Rose**; 9. Threave Rovers; 10. Wigtown & Bladnoch	11. Auchinleck Talbot; 12. ^{(2015–16 West Super League winners)}; 13. **Beith Juniors** ^{(2015–16 Scottish Junior Cup winners)}; 14. **Bonnyrigg Rose**^{(2015–16 East Superleague winners)}; 15. Colville Park ^{(2015–16 Scottish Amateur Cup winners)}; 16. **Leith Athletic** ^{(2015–16 EoSFL winners)}; 17. Newton Stewart; 18. St Cuthbert Wanderers ^{(2015–16 SoSFL winners)}

The following teams received a bye to the second preliminary round: Banks O’Dee, Burntisland Shipyard, Coldstream, Girvan, Golspie Sutherland, Linlithgow Rose and Threave Rovers.

==== Matches ====
13 August 2016	Edusport Academy	**2–2**	Colville Park	Annan
15:00				Stadium: Galabank; Referee: Chris Graham

13 August 2016	Newton Stewart	**0–4**	**Beith Juniors**	Newton Stewart
15:00		Beith Juniors	Frize 2'; D McPherson; A McPherson	Stadium: Blairmount Park; Referee: Duncan Smith

13 August 2016	Wigtown & Bladnoch	**0–4**	**Auchinleck Talbot**	Wigtown
15:00		Auchinleck Talbot	Shankland 58', 71'; Wilson 66', 83'	Stadium: Trammondford Park; Referee: Michael Taylor

13 August 2016	St Cuthbert Wanderers	**0–3**	**Leith Athletic**	Kirkcudbright
15:00		Leith Athletic	(o.g.); Fee 2'	Stadium: St Mary's Park; Referee: Steven Reid

14 August 2016	Glasgow University	**2–8**	**Bonnyrigg Rose**	Airdrie
15:00	Thomson 35', 56'	thejuniors.info	Tobin 4'; McLaren 6', 46'; Moyes 37'; Jamieson 55', 67', 70', 72'	Stadium: Excelsior Stadium; Referee: Scott Millar

==== Replay ====
20 August 2016	**Colville Park**	**1–0**	Edusport Academy	Glasgow
15:00	McKay	Report		Stadium: New Tinto Park; Referee: Chris Graham

=== Preliminary round 2 ===
==== Matches ====
3 September 2016	**Leith Athletic**	**1–0**	Coldstream	Edinburgh
15:00	Hay 30'	Coldstream FC; Archived		Stadium: Ainslie Park; Attendance: David Dickinson

3 September 2016	**Bonnyrigg Rose**	**14–0**	Burntisland Shipyard	Bonnyrigg
15:00	Donaldson 5'; McIntosh 15', 17', 65', 66', 71', 78', 85'; Moyes 33'; Jamieson 43', 49'; Tobin 60'; McGachie 87'; Kidd 88'	Bonnyrigg Rose TV		Stadium: New Dundas Park; Referee: Lloyd Wilson

3 September 2016	Colville Park	**0–1**	**Girvan**	Glasgow
15:00		Girvan FC	Jardine	Stadium: New Tinto Park; Referee: Duncan Williams

3 September 2016	Beith Juniors	**2–2**	Auchinleck Talbot	Beith
14:00	Wilson 45+2'; McGowan 69'	Auchinleck Talbot	Young 45'; Pope 85'	Stadium: Bellsdale Park; Referee: Peter Stuart

3 September 2016	Threave Rovers	**1–2**	**Linlithgow Rose**	Castle Douglas
15:00	(1–2)	Linlithgow Rose	Weir (0–1); Batchelor (0–2)	Stadium: Meadow Park; Referee: Stephen Brown

3 September 2016	**Banks O’Dee**	**4–0**	Golspie Sutherland	Aberdeen
15:00	Winton 13'; Henderson 26'; Heads 58'; Lennox 66'	Banks O' Dee		Stadium: Spain Park; Referee: Lorraine Clark

==== Replay ====
10 September 2016	Auchinleck Talbot	**0–3**	**Beith Juniors**	Auchinleck
15:00	Young (yellow card) 48' (yellow-red card) 58'	Auchinleck Talbot	McGowan 2'; Christie 22'; McLaughlin 59'	Stadium: Beechwood Park; Referee: Peter Stuart

== First round ==
The first round took place on the weekend of 24 September 2016. Along with the six winners from the second preliminary round, there were 30 new entries at this stage, 14 from the Lowland Football League and 16 from the Highland Football League. From the first round, teams were permitted to use an additional fourth substitute in the extra time period should a replayed tie go to extra time.

=== Draw ===
The draw for the first round was made on Monday, 5 September at 2:30pm. The draw took place at Edinburgh College and was made by Hibernian's cup winning captain David Gray. It was streamed live on the Scottish Cup's official Facebook page.

Teams in Italics were not known at the time of the draw. Teams in Bold advanced to the second round.

Lowland Football League	Highland Football League	Other
**BSC Glasgow**; Civil Service Strollers; **Cumbernauld Colts**; Dalbeattie Star; **East Kilbride**; Edinburgh University; **Gala Fairydean Rovers**; **Gretna 2008**; **Hawick Royal Albert**; **Preston Athletic**; Selkirk; **Stirling University**; Vale of Leithen; **Whitehill Welfare**	**Brora Rangers**; **Buckie Thistle**; Clachnacuddin; Deveronvale; **Forres Mechanics**; Fort William; Fraserburgh; **Huntly**; Inverurie Loco Works; Keith; Lossiemouth; Nairn County; Rothes; Strathspey Thistle; Turriff United; **Wick Academy**	East of Scotland teams: Leith Athletic; SJFA teams: **Banks O'Dee**; **Beith Juniors**; **Bonnyrigg Rose**; Girvan; **Linlithgow Rose**

=== Matches ===
24 September 2016	Turriff United	**1–1**	Bonnyrigg Rose	Turriff
15:00				Stadium: The Haughs; Referee: Stephen Brown

24 September 2016	Fort William	**1–4**	**Brora Rangers**	Fort William
15:00				Stadium: Claggen Park; Referee: Garry Doherty

24 September 2016	Forres Mechanics	**2–2**	Lossiemouth	Forres
15:00				Stadium: Mosset Park; Referee: Duncan Smith

24 September 2016	**East Kilbride**	**9–1**	Vale of Leithen	East Kilbride
15:00	Victoria 3'; Winters 2'; Strachan 2'; Capuano; Hughes			Stadium: K Park; Referee: Lorraine Clark

24 September 2016	**BSC Glasgow**	**3–1**	Rothes	Alloa
15:00				Stadium: Recreation Park; Referee: Graham Grainger

24 September 2016	Deveronvale	**0–3**	**Gretna 2008**	Banff
15:00				Stadium: Princess Royal Park; Referee: Gavin Duncan

24 September 2016	Keith	**0–1**	**Banks O' Dee**	Keith
15:00				Stadium: Kynoch Park; Referee: Billy Baxter

24 September 2016	Edinburgh University	**0–1**	**Whitehill Welfare**	Edinburgh
15:00				Stadium: East Peffermill; Referee: Lloyd Wilson

24 September 2016	**Gala Fairydean Rovers**	**3–1**	Fraserburgh	Galashiels
15:00				Stadium: Netherdale; Referee: David Dickinson

24 September 2016	**Beith Juniors**	**6–0**	Strathspey	Beith
15:00				Stadium: Bellsdale Park; Referee: Stephen Graham

24 September 2016	Civil Service Strollers	**1–1**	Hawick Royal Albert	Edinburgh
15:00				Stadium: Edinburgh Area Civil Service Sports Association; Referee: Calum Haswell

24 September 2016	Nairn County	**2–3**	**Preston Athletic**	Nairn
15:00				Stadium: Station Park; Referee: Steven Traynor

24 September 2016	Inverurie Loco Works	**0–6**	**Buckie Thistle**	Buckie
15:00				Stadium: Victoria Park; Referee: David Watt

24 September 2016	Clachnacuddin	**1–2**	**Stirling University**	Inverness
15:00				Stadium: Grant Street Park; Referee: Liam Duncan

24 September 2016	Dalbeattie Star	**1–3**	**Wick Academy**	Dalbeattie
15:00				Stadium: Islecroft Stadium; Referee: Duncan Williams

24 September 2016	Selkirk	**0–3**	**Linlithgow Rose**	Selkirk
15:00				Stadium: Yarrow Park; Referee: Calum Scott

24 September 2016	Girvan	**1–2**	**Huntly**	Girvan
15:00				Stadium: Hamilton Park; Referee: Matthew MacDermid

25 September 2016	Leith Athletic	**0–0**	Cumbernauld Colts	Edinburgh
16:00				Stadium: Ainslie Park

=== Replays ===
1 October 2016	**Bonnyrigg Rose**	**4–1**	Turriff United	Bonnyrigg
15:00				Stadium: New Dundas Park

1 October 2016	**Hawick Royal Albert**	**6–2**	Civil Service Strollers	Hawick
15:00				Stadium: Albert Park

1 October 2016	Lossiemouth	**0–4**	**Forres Mechanics**	Lossiemouth
15:00				Stadium: Grant Park

5 October 2016	**Cumbernauld Colts**	**1–0**	Leith Athletic	Cumbernauld
20:00				Stadium: Broadwood Stadium

== Second round ==
The second round took place on the weekend of 22 October. Along with the 18 winners from the first round, there were 14 new entries at this stage, two from the Lowland Football League, two from the Highland Football League and 10 from Scottish League Two.

=== Draw ===
The draw for the second round was hosted by Highland Football League champions Cove Rangers and took place at the Aberdeen Altens Hotel on Monday, 26 September at 6pm. Scottish Football Association president, Alex McRea oversaw the draw which was made by Nigg Community Council chairperson Alan Strachan.

Teams in Italics were not known at the time of the draw. Teams in Bold advanced to the third round.

Scottish League Two	Lowland Football League	Highland Football League	Other
**Annan Athletic**; **Arbroath**; Berwick Rangers; **Clyde**; Cowdenbeath; **Edinburgh City**; **Elgin City**; Forfar Athletic; **Montrose**; **Stirling Albion**	BSC Glasgow; Cumbernauld Colts; **East Kilbride**; East Stirlingshire; Gala Fairydean Rovers; Gretna 2008; **Hawick Royal Albert**; Preston Athletic; **Spartans**; Stirling University; Whitehill Welfare	Brora Rangers; **Buckie Thistle**; Cove Rangers; **Formartine United**; **Forres Mechanics**; Huntly; **Wick Academy**	SJFA teams: Banks O' Dee; **Beith Juniors**; Linlithgow Rose; **Bonnyrigg Rose**

=== Matches ===
22 October 2016	Annan Athletic	**0–0**	East Stirlingshire	Annan
15:00		Flashscores.com		Stadium: Galabank

22 October 2016	Banks O' Dee	**2–2**	Formartine United	Aberdeen
15:00	Lawson 61' (o.g.); Lennox 84' (pen.)	Flashscores.com	Young 30'; Barbour 52'	Stadium: Spain Park

22 October 2016	Brora Rangers	**0–2**	**Clyde**	Brora
15:00		Flashscores.com	Gormley 60'; Flynn 78'	Stadium: Dudgeon Park

22 October 2016	BSC Glasgow	**0–1**	**Beith Juniors**	Alloa
15:00		Flashscores.com	McLaughlin 90+4'	Stadium: Recreation Park

22 October 2016	**Bonnyrigg Rose**	**2–1**	Cove Rangers	Bonnyrigg
15:00	Hoskins 71' (pen.); Kidd 74'	Flashscores.com	Smith 72'	Stadium: New Dundas Park

22 October 2016	Berwick Rangers	**2–3**	**Hawick Royal Albert**	Berwick-upon-Tweed, England
15:00	McKenna 14'; Rutherford 67'	Flashscores.com	Morris 3', 10', 38'	Stadium: Shielfield Park

22 October 2016	Linlithgow Rose	**0–3**	**Stirling Albion**	Linlithgow
15:00		Flashscores.com	Olanrewaju 27'; McKenzie 60'; Ferns 90+3'	Stadium: Prestonfield

22 October 2016	**Wick Academy**	**4–1**	Whitehill Welfare	Wick
15:00	Pickles 53'; Mackay 55', 65' (pen.); Macadie 84'	Flashscores.com	McCulloch 18'	Stadium: Harmsworth Park

22 October 2016	Preston Athletic	**0–3**	**Montrose**	Prestonpans
15:00		Flashscores.com	Fraser 50' (pen.); Templeman 67'; Court 86'	Stadium: Pennypit Park

22 October 2016	Huntly	**0–2**	**Spartans**	Huntly
15:00		Flashscores.com	Thomson 3'; Townsley 6'	Stadium: Christie Park

22 October 2016	Edinburgh City	**0–0**	Forfar Athletic	Edinburgh
15:00		Flashscores.com		Stadium: Meadowbank Stadium

22 October 2016	Cowdenbeath	**0–1**	**East Kilbride**	Cowdenbeath
15:00		Flashscores.com	Vitoria 5'	Stadium: Central Park

22 October 2016	Cumbernauld Colts	**2–2**	Forres Mechanics	Cumbernauld
15:00	Graham 4'; Soane 69'	Flashscores.com	Selkirk 30'; Barclay 67'	Stadium: Broadwood Stadium

22 October 2016	**Arbroath**	**3–1**	Stirling University	Arbroath
15:00	Hamilton 23'; Little 24'; Doris 44'	Flashscores.com	Geddes 18'	Stadium: Gayfield Park

22 October 2016	Gala Fairydean Rovers	**0–4**	**Elgin City**	Galashiels
15:00		Flashscores.com	Sutherland 14'; Miller 21' (o.g.); McLeish 30'; Cameron 47'	Stadium: Netherdale

22 October 2016	Buckie Thistle	**1–1**	Gretna 2008	Buckie
15:00	McLeod 66'		Murray 9'	Stadium: Victoria Park

=== Replays ===
29 October 2016	East Stirlingshire	**1–2**	**Annan Athletic**	Stenhousemuir
15:00	Sludden 31'; Rodgers (red card) 90'	Flashscores.com	McKenna 40'; Asghar 90+4'	Stadium: Ochilview

29 October 2016	**Formartine United**	**7–2**	Banks O' Dee	Pitmedden
15:00	Anderson 20'; Masson 40', 43', 84'; Gauld 45+3'; Graeme 75'; Barbour 77'	Flashscores.com	Henderson 4'; Buchanan 44'	Stadium: North Lodge Park

29 October 2016	**Forres Mechanics**	**4–0**	Cumbernauld Colts	Forres
15:00	McGovern 1'; Soane 70'; Fraser 75'; Scott 90'	Flashscores.com		Stadium: Mosset Park

29 October 2016	Gretna 2008	**2–6**	**Buckie Thistle**	Gretna
15:00	Neil 49'; Murray 79'; Neill (red card) 76'	Flashscores.com	McLeod 4', 10', 49', 55', 68'; Dorrat 90+3'; Taylor (red card) 45'	Stadium: Raydale Park

1 November 2016	Forfar Athletic	**0–1**	**Edinburgh City**	Forfar
19:45		Flashscores.com	Allum 63'	Stadium: Station Park

== Third round ==
The third round took place on the weekend of 26 November 2016. Along with the 16 winners from the second round, there were to be 16 new entries, 10 from Scottish League One and six from the Scottish Championship, at this stage.

=== Draw ===
The draw for the third round was made at 6pm on Tuesday, 25 October. The draw took place at Cappielow and was hosted by Greenock Morton. Chief Executive of the Greenock Morton Community Trust, Warren Hawke helped make the draw.

Teams in Italics were not known at the time of the draw. Teams in Bold advanced to the fourth round.

Scottish Championship	Scottish League One	Scottish League Two	Other
**Ayr United**; Dumbarton; **Dunfermline Athletic**; **Greenock Morton**; Queen of the South; **St Mirren**	Airdrieonians; **Albion Rovers**; **Alloa Athletic**; Brechin City; **East Fife**; **Livingston**; Peterhead; **Queen's Park**; **Stenhousemuir**; **Stranraer**	Annan Athletic; Arbroath; **Clyde**; Edinburgh City; **Elgin City**; Montrose; **Stirling Albion**	Lowland Football League: East Kilbride; Hawick Royal Albert; Spartans; Highland Football League: Buckie Thistle; **Formartine United**; Forres Mechanics; Wick Academy; SJFA teams: Beith Juniors; **Bonnyrigg Rose**

=== Matches ===
26 November 2016	Bonnyrigg Rose	**0–0**	Dumbarton	Bonnyrigg
13:40		Flashscores.com		Stadium: New Dundas Park

26 November 2016	**Elgin City**	**8–1**	Hawick Royal Albert	Elgin
15:00	Sutherland 6', 24', 30', 73'; McLeish 53'; Cameron 64', 89'; Gunn 76'	Flashscores.com	Mitchell 32'	Stadium: Borough Briggs

26 November 2016	Airdrieonians	**1–2**	**Livingston**	Airdrie
15:00	Ryan 18'	Flashscores.com	Cadden 30'; Mullen 62'	Stadium: Excelsior Stadium

26 November 2016	Buckie Thistle	**3–5**	**Dunfermline Athletic**	Buckie
15:00	McLeod 14'; Angus 33', 68'	Flashscores.com	Munro 12' (o.g.); Paton 16' (pen.); Higginbotham 58'; McMullan 68', 90+2'	Stadium: Victoria Park

26 November 2016	Forres Mechanics	**2–2**	Stenhousemuir	Forres
15:00	Allan 27'; L Fraser 66'	Flashscores.com	Kerr 45'; Furtado 47'	Stadium: Mosset Park

26 November 2016	Peterhead	**0–1**	**Alloa Athletic**	Peterhead
15:00		Flashscores.com	Longworth 74'	Stadium: Balmoor Stadium

A total of nine third round ties were postponed due to frozen pitches. The St Mirren-Spartans, Beith Juniors-Greenock Morton, Clyde-Arbroath, Albion Rovers-Queen of the South and Stirling Albion-Wick Academy matches were postponed on Friday, 25 November, a day before they were due to take place after failing pitch inspections due to the freezing weather. These games were subsequently rearranged for 29 November, 3 and 6 December. The Queen's Park-Montrose match was originally scheduled for 29 November due to the League Cup final taking place at Hampden Park, Queen's Park's home ground, on 27 November. A further three games were postponed after failing early pitch inspections on Saturday, 26 November. These were the East Fife-Edinburgh City, Stranraer-East Kilbride and Brechin City-Ayr United matches. The Formartine United-Annan Athletic match originally passed a pitch inspection at 7am but was postponed after failing a supplementary inspection at 10:30am after temperatures in Pitmedden hadn't risen as expected.

29 November 2016	**Queen's Park**	**2–0**	Montrose	Glasgow
19:45	Galt 15'; Woods 54'	Flashscores.com		Stadium: Hampden Park

29 November 2016	**Albion Rovers**	**2–1**	Queen of the South	Coatbridge
19:45	M Dunlop 16'; Ferguson 90+4'	Flashscores.com	Hamill 76'	Stadium: Cliftonhill

29 November 2016	East Fife	**1–1**	Edinburgh City	Methil
19:45	See 39'	Flashscores.com	Kerr 63'	Stadium: Bayview Stadium

29 November 2016	Brechin City	**0–1**	**Ayr United**	Brechin
19:45		Flashscores.com	O'Connell 70'	Stadium: Glebe Park

29 November 2016	**St Mirren**	**5–1**	Spartans	Paisley
20:00	Shankland 15', 68'; Mallan 20'; McAllister 32'; Sutton 63'	Flashscores.com	Beesley 73'	Stadium: St Mirren Park

3 December 2016	Beith Juniors	**0–6**	**Greenock Morton**	Beith
13:30		Flashscores.com	Forbes 11'; Tidser 17'; McDonagh 42'; O'Ware 51', 90'; Lindsay 78'	Stadium: Bellsdale Park

3 December 2016	**Stirling Albion**	**2–0**	Wick Academy	Stirling
15:00	Henderson 43'; Bikey 84'	Flashscores.com		Stadium: Forthbank Stadium

3 December 2016	**Stranraer**	**2–1**	East Kilbride	Stranraer
15:00	Gibson 26' (pen.); Strachan 89' (o.g.)	Flashscores.com	Winter 14'	Stadium: Stair Park

3 December 2016	**Formartine United**	**4–0**	Annan Athletic	Pitmedden
15:00	Gethins 56', 59', 72'; Barbour 69'	Flashscores.com		Stadium: North Lodge Park

6 December 2016	**Clyde**	**5–0**	Arbroath	Cumbernauld
19:45	MacDonald 14' (pen.), 45' (pen.); McLaughlin 21'; Gormley 73', 90'	Flashscores.com		Stadium: Broadwood Stadium

=== Replays ===
3 December 2016	**Stenhousemuir**	**3–1**	Forres Mechanics	Stenhousemuir
15:00	McMenamin 12', 15', 81'	Flashscores.com	Baxter 87' (pen.)	Stadium: Ochilview Park

6 December 2016	Dumbarton	**0–1**	**Bonnyrigg Rose**	Dumbarton
19:45		Flashscores.com	Nelson 86'	Stadium: Dumbarton Football Stadium

7 December 2016	Edinburgh City	**0–1**	**East Fife**	Edinburgh
19:45		Flashscores.com	Kane 54'	Stadium: Meadowbank Stadium; Attendance: 397; Referee: Lowe

Notes

1. A- Originally due to start at 1:30pm, kick-off was delayed by 10 minutes in the Bonnyrigg Rose-Dumbarton match to allow more supporters entry to the ground.

== Fourth round ==
The fourth round took place on the weekend of 21 January 2017. Along with the 16 winners from the third round, there were 16 new entries, four from the Scottish Championship and 12 from the Scottish Premiership, at this stage. Ayr United became the first Scottish club to make four substitutions in a single match in their fourth round replay with Queen's Park. The Scottish FA's rule change at the start of the season to allow a fourth substitute to be used if a match went to extra time was used for the first time when Michael Rose replaced Nicky Devlin in the 121st minute of the match on 24 January 2017.

=== Draw ===
The draw for the fourth round was made at 6:35pm on Monday, 28 November. The draw was made at Rugby Park and hosted by Kilmarnock. It was made by Kilmarnock's 1997 Scottish Cup winning midfielder Gary Holt, alongside the Scottish Football Association President, Alan McRae, and Liz Poole-Adams from competition sponsors William Hill.

Teams in italics were not known at the time of the draw. Teams in Bold advanced to the fifth round.

Scottish Premiership	Scottish Championship	Scottish League One	Scottish League Two	Other
**Aberdeen**; **Celtic**; Dundee; **Hamilton Academical**; **Heart of Midlothian**; **Inverness Caledonian Thistle**; Kilmarnock; Motherwell; **Partick Thistle**; **Rangers**; **Ross County**; **St Johnstone**	**Ayr United**; Dundee United; **Dunfermline Athletic**; Falkirk; **Greenock Morton**; **Hibernian** **(holders)**; Raith Rovers; **St Mirren**	Albion Rovers; Alloa Athletic; **East Fife**; Livingston; Queen's Park; Stenhousemuir; Stranraer	**Clyde**; Elgin City; Stirling Albion	Highland Football League: Formartine United; SJFA teams: Bonnyrigg Rose

=== Matches ===
21 January 2017	**Rangers**	**2–1**	Motherwell	Glasgow
12:30	Miller 84', 89'	BBC	Moult 74'	Stadium: Ibrox Stadium; Attendance: 31,921; Referee: Craig Thomson

21 January 2017	**Ross County**	**6–2**	Dundee United	Dingwall
15:00	Routis 6', 76'; Quinn 16'; Chow 28'; Boyce 30'; O'Brien 90+2'	BBC	Andreu 13', 45+2'	Stadium: Victoria Park; Attendance: 2,440; Referee: Kevin Clancy

21 January 2017	**St Johnstone**	**2–0**	Stenhousemuir	Perth
15:00	MacLean 6'; Alston 32'	BBC		Stadium: McDiarmid Park; Attendance: 2,441; Referee: Euan Anderson

21 January 2017	Livingston	**0–1**	**East Fife**	Livingston
15:00		BBC	Paterson 27'	Stadium: Almondvale; Attendance: 726; Referee: Colin Steven

21 January 2017	**Aberdeen**	**4–0**	Stranraer	Aberdeen
15:00	Rooney 30', 50' (pen.); McGinn 35', 54'	BBC		Stadium: Pittodrie Stadium; Attendance: 8.960; Referee: Don Robertson

21 January 2017	Kilmarnock	**0–1**	**Hamilton Academical**	Kilmarnock
15:00		BBC	Bingham 90+2' (pen.)	Stadium: Rugby Park; Attendance: 2,944; Referee: Crawford Allan

21 January 2017	Bonnyrigg Rose	**1–8**	**Hibernian**	Edinburgh
15:00	Hoskins 33' (pen.)	BBC	Shinnie 11'; Keatings 15', 76'; Humphrey 24'; Cummings 52', 72'; Stevenson 61'; Forster 82'	Stadium: Tynecastle Stadium; Referee: Alan Muir

21 January 2017	Ayr United	**0–0**	Queen's Park	Ayr
15:00		BBC		Stadium: Somerset Park; Attendance: 1,326; Referee: Barry Cook

21 January 2017	**Partick Thistle**	**4–0**	Formartine United	Glasgow
15:00	Erskine 10', 31'; Lawless 30'; Osman 64'	BBC		Stadium: Firhill Stadium; Attendance: 2,782; Referee: Craig Charleston

21 January 2017	Stirling Albion	**2–2**	Clyde	Stirling
15:00	Bikey 9', 84'	BBC	MacDonald 24', 62'	Stadium: Forthbank Stadium; Attendance: 869; Referee: Mat Northcroft

21 January 2017	Alloa Athletic	**2–3**	**Dunfermline Athletic**	Alloa
15:00	McCluskey 68'; Spence 90+2'	BBC	Clark 12'; McMullan 44'; Cardle 60'	Stadium: Recreation Park; Attendance: 1,871; Referee: Alan Newlands

21 January 2017	Dundee	**0–2**	**St Mirren**	Dundee
15:00		BBC	Sutton 25'; Baird 50'	Stadium: Dens Park; Attendance: 3,622; Referee: Bobby Madden

21 January 2017	**Greenock Morton**	**2–0**	Falkirk	Greenock
15:00	Lindsay 39'; Forbes 47'	BBC		Stadium: Cappielow; Attendance: 2,349; Referee: Greg Aitken

21 January 2017	Elgin City	**1–2**	**Inverness Caledonian Thistle**	Elgin
15:10	Nicolson 25'	BBC	Cole 32'; Doumbouya 66'	Stadium: Borough Briggs; Attendance: John McKendrick; Referee: 3,624

22 January 2017	Raith Rovers	**1–1**	Heart of Midlothian	Kirkcaldy
13:05	McManus 90'	BBC	Walker 37'	Stadium: Stark's Park; Attendance: 5,036; Referee: John Beaton

22 January 2017	Albion Rovers	**0–3**	**Celtic**	Airdrie
15:00		BBC	Sinclair 30'; Dembélé 77'; Armstrong 90'	Stadium: Excelsior Stadium; Attendance: 8,319; Referee: Willie Collum

=== Replays ===
24 January 2017	Queen's Park	**2–2** (a.e.t.) (**4–5** p)	**Ayr United**	Glasgow
19:45	Woods 4'; Wharton 32'	BBC	Moore 26'; Balatoni 83'	Stadium: Hampden Park; Attendance: 1,026; Referee: Barry Cook
	**Penalties**
	McGeever (penalty scored); Cummins (penalty scored); McKernon (penalty scored); Wharton (penalty missed); Millen (penalty scored); Fotheringham (penalty missed)		(penalty scored) Forrest; (penalty scored) Rose; (penalty missed) Cairney; (penalty scored) McGuffie; (penalty scored) Harkins; (penalty scored) Boyle

25 January 2017	**Heart of Midlothian**	**4–2** (a.e.t.)	Raith Rovers	Edinburgh
19:45	Currie 35'; Martin 94' (pen.); Walker 105' (pen.); Johnsen 114'	BBC	Barr 14'; Hardie 101'	Stadium: Tynecastle Stadium; Attendance: 10,740; Referee: John Beaton

31 January 2017	**Clyde**	**3–2**	Stirling Albion	Cumbernauld
19:45	Gormley 5', 10', 39'	BBC	Henderson 4' (pen.), 82' (pen.)	Stadium: Broadwood Stadium; Referee: Mat Northcroft

Notes

1. B- The Bonnyrigg Rose-Hibernian and Albion Rovers-Celtic matches were moved to Tynecastle Stadium and the Excelsior Stadium respectively in accordance with Scottish Cup rule 13 as Bonnyrigg Rose's and Albion Rovers' home grounds, New Dundas Park and Cliftonhill, were deemed unsuitable for the ties.
2. C- Originally due to start at 3:00pm, kick-off was delayed by 10 minutes in the Elgin City-Inverness Caledonian Thistle match to allow more supporters entry to the ground.

== Fifth round ==
The fifth round took place on the weekend of 11 February 2017.

=== Draw ===
The draw for the fifth round was made live on Sky Sports following the conclusion of the Albion Rovers-Celtic match on 22 January 2017. The draw was made by former Hibernian manager Alan Stubbs and Celtic fan Rod Stewart, who memorably performed his part of the draw in an enthusiastic manner.

Teams in italics were not known at the time of the draw. Teams in Bold advanced to the quarter-finals.

Scottish Premiership	Scottish Championship	Scottish League One	Scottish League Two
**Aberdeen**; **Celtic**; **Hamilton Academical**; Heart of Midlothian; Inverness Caledonian Thistle; **Partick Thistle**; **Rangers**; Ross County; St Johnstone	**Ayr United**; Dunfermline Athletic; Greenock Morton; **Hibernian**; **St Mirren**	East Fife	Clyde

=== Matches ===
11 February 2017	**Celtic**	**6–0**	Inverness Caledonian Thistle	Glasgow
12:15	Lustig 20'; Dembélé 45', 50', 59'; Tierney 86'; Brown 90+1'	BBC		Stadium: Celtic Park; Attendance: 25,577; Referee: Kevin Clancy

11 February 2017	Dunfermline Athletic	**1–1**	Hamilton Academical	Dunfermline
15:00	McMullan 30'	BBC	Redmond 74'	Stadium: East End Park; Attendance: 2,945; Referee: Craig Thomson

11 February 2017	St Johnstone	**0–1**	**Partick Thistle**	Perth
15:00		BBC	Barton 7'	Stadium: McDiarmid Park; Attendance: 2,884; Referee: Steven McLean

11 February 2017	Ayr United	**1–1**	Clyde	Ayr
15:00	Cairney 70'	BBC	Gormley 55'	Stadium: Somerset Park; Attendance: 1,554; Referee: Stephen Finnie

11 February 2017	East Fife	**2–3**	**St Mirren**	Methil
15:00	Duggan 54' (pen.), 90+3' (pen.)	BBC	Smith 33'; Morgan 70', 84'	Stadium: Bayview Stadium; Attendance: 1,510; Referee: Don Robertson

11 February 2017	Ross County	**0–1**	**Aberdeen**	Dingwall
15:00		BBC	Logan 87'	Stadium: Victoria Park; Attendance: 4,671; Referee: Bobby Madden

12 February 2017	Heart of Midlothian	**0–0**	Hibernian	Edinburgh
12:30		BBC		Stadium: Tynecastle Stadium; Attendance: 16,971; Referee: Willie Collum

12 February 2017	**Rangers**	**2–1**	Greenock Morton	Glasgow
15:00	Miller 13'; Waghorn 61'	BBC	Tidser 7'	Stadium: Ibrox Stadium; Attendance: 30,295; Referee: Andrew Dallas

=== Replays ===
14 February 2017	Clyde	**1–2** (a.e.t.)	**Ayr United**	Cumbernauld
19:45	Gormley 88'	BBC	McDaid 11'; Wardrope 117'	Stadium: Broadwood Stadium; Attendance: 965; Referee: Stephen Finnie

14 February 2017	**Hamilton Academical**	**1–1** (a.e.t.) (**3–0** p)	Dunfermline Athletic	Hamilton
19:45	Bingham 87' (pen.)	BBC	Morris 25'	Stadium: Superseal Stadium; Attendance: 1,222; Referee: Craig Thomson
	**Penalties**
	Donati (penalty scored); Redmond (penalty missed); Brophy (penalty scored); Devlin (penalty scored)		(penalty missed) McCabe; (penalty missed) Paton; (penalty missed) Reilly

22 February 2017	**Hibernian**	**3–1**	Heart of Midlothian	Edinburgh
19:45	Cummings 21'; Holt 37'; Shinnie 63'	BBC	Gonçalves 70'	Stadium: Easter Road Stadium; Attendance: 20,205; Referee: Steven McLean

== Quarter-finals ==
The quarter-finals took place on the weekend of 4 March 2017.

=== Draw ===
The draw for the quarter-finals was made live on Sky Sports following the conclusion of the Rangers-Greenock Morton match on 12 February 2017. The draw was conducted by seven-time Scottish Cup winner Alex McLeish.

Teams in italics were not known at the time of the draw. Teams in Bold advanced to the semi-finals.

Scottish Premiership	Scottish Championship
**Aberdeen**; **Celtic**; Hamilton Academical; Partick Thistle; **Rangers**	Ayr United; **Hibernian**; St Mirren

=== Matches ===
4 March 2017	**Rangers**	**6–0**	Hamilton Academical	Glasgow
12:30	Waghorn 33' (pen.); Garner 48', 88', 90+1'; Toral 77'; Hill 82'	BBC Sport		Stadium: Ibrox Stadium; Attendance: 27,287; Referee: John Beaton

4 March 2017	**Hibernian**	**3–1**	Ayr United	Edinburgh
15:00	McGinn 7'; Cummings 12' (pen.); Keatings 79'	BBC Sport	McGuffie 33'	Stadium: Easter Road Stadium; Attendance: 13,602; Referee: Nick Walsh

5 March 2017	**Celtic**	**4–1**	St Mirren	Glasgow
12:30	Lustig 58'; Sinclair 59'; Dembélé 68'; Griffiths 78'	BBC Sport	Davis 13'	Stadium: Celtic Park; Attendance: 27,455; Referee: Steven McLean

5 March 2017	**Aberdeen**	**1–0**	Partick Thistle	Aberdeen
15:00	Shinnie 43'	BBC Sport		Stadium: Pittodrie Stadium; Attendance: 11,333; Referee: Craig Thomson

== Semi-finals ==
The semi-finals took place on the weekend of 22 April 2017.

=== Draw ===
The draw for the semi-finals was made live on Sky Sports News on 5 March 2017. The draw was made by Lisbon Lion Bertie Auld and Aberdeen's 1990 Scottish Cup winning manager Alex Smith.

Teams in Bold advanced to the final.

Scottish Premiership	Scottish Championship
**Aberdeen**; **Celtic**; Rangers	Hibernian

=== Matches ===
22 April 2017	Hibernian	**2–3**	**Aberdeen**	Glasgow
12:15	Holt 36'; McGeouch 60'	BBC Sport	Rooney 1'; Christie 25'; McGregor 86' (o.g.)	Stadium: Hampden Park; Attendance: 31,969; Referee: John Beaton

23 April 2017	**Celtic**	**2–0**	Rangers	Glasgow
12:00	McGregor 11'; Sinclair 51' (pen.)	BBC Sport		Stadium: Hampden Park; Attendance: 49,645; Referee: William Collum

== Final ==
27 May 2017
15:00

Celtic	2 – 1	Aberdeen
Armstrong 11'; Rogic 90+2'	Report	Hayes 9'

Hampden Park, Glasgow
Attendance: 48,713
Referee: Bobby Madden

== Statistics ==
=== Top goalscorers ===
As of 5 March 2017

Rank	Player	Club	Goals
1	David Gormley	Clyde	8
1	Wayne McIntosh	Bonnyrigg Rose	8
3	John McLeod	Buckie Thistle	7
3	Josh Morris	Hawick Royal Albert	7
5	Sean Jamieson	Bonnyrigg Rose	6
6	Moussa Dembélé	Celtic	5
6	Lee Fraser	Forres Mechanics	5
6	Shane Sutherland	Elgin City	5
9	Peter MacDonald	Clyde	4
9	Fraser McLaren	Bonnyrigg Rose	4
9	Joao Pereira Vitoria	East Kilbride	4

== Broadcasting rights ==
From round four onwards, selected matches from the Scottish Cup are broadcast live in the UK and Ireland by BBC Scotland and Sky Sports. BBC Scotland has the option to show one tie per round with Sky Sports showing two ties per round with one replay also, Sky Sports show both semi-finals live with one also on BBC Scotland & both channels screen the final live.

The following matches are to be broadcast live on television:

Round	Sky Sports	BBC
Fourth round	Rangers v Motherwell; Albion Rovers v Celtic	Raith Rovers v Heart of Midlothian
Fifth round	Heart of Midlothian v Hibernian; Rangers v Greenock Morton	Celtic v Inverness Caledonian Thistle
Quarter-finals	Rangers v Hamilton Academical; Celtic v St Mirren	Aberdeen v Partick Thistle
Semi-finals	Celtic v Rangers; Hibernian v Aberdeen	Hibernian v Aberdeen
Final	Celtic v Aberdeen	
