= HRAFC =

HRAFC may refer to:

- Harrogate Railway Athletic F.C.
- Hawick Royal Albert F.C.
