= 2015–16 North Superleague =

McBookie.com Superleague
- Season: 2015–16
- Champions: Banks O' Dee
- Relegated: Ellon United; FC Stoneywood
- Matches: 182
- Goals: 684 (3.76 per match)

The 2015–16 North Superleague is the fifteenth staging of the North Superleague, the highest tier of league competition in the North Region of the Scottish Junior Football Association. The season began on 11 August 2015. The winners of this competition are eligible to enter the 2016–17 Scottish Cup

Banks O' Dee won the championship on 14 May 2016, to claim their third North Superleague title.

== Member clubs for the 2015–16 season ==
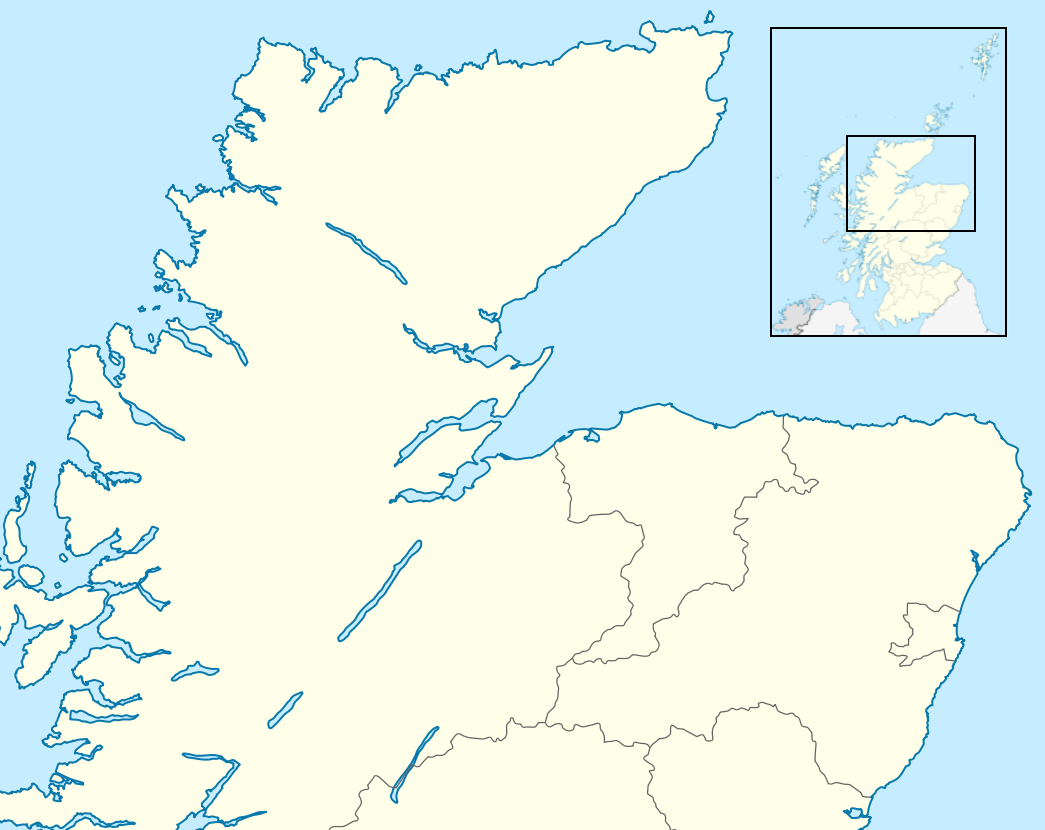
Location of teams in 2015–16 North Superleague

Hermes are the reigning champions.

North First Division (East) champions Bridge of Don Thistle replaced the relegated New Elgin. North First Division (West) champions Grantown were refused promotion due to ground criteria. Runners-up Dufftown were eventually promoted after defeating Cruden Bay, 7–1 in a play-off match.

Club	Location	Ground	Finishing position 2014–15
Banchory St. Ternan	Crathes	Milton Park	10th
Banks O' Dee	Aberdeen	Spain Park	3rd
Bridge of Don Thistle	Newburgh	Gallowshill Park	North First Division (East) 1st
Culter	Peterculter	Crombie Park	4th
Deveronside	Banff	Canal Park	5th
Dufftown	Dufftown	Westburn Park	North First Division (West) 2nd
Dyce Juniors	Dyce	Ian Mair Park	8th
Ellon United	Ellon	The Meadows	10th
Hall Russell United	Bridge of Don	Denmore Park	11th
Hermes	Bridge of Don	Uniconn Park	1st (champions)
Inverness City	Inverness	Lister Park	7th
Maud	Maud	Maud Pleasure Park	2nd
Stonehaven	Stonehaven	Glenury Park	9th
FC Stoneywood	Aberdeen	Clark Commercial Park	6th

== League table ==
Pos	Team	Pld	W	D	L	GF	GA	GD	Pts	Qualification or relegation
1	Banks O' Dee (C)	26	20	1	5	87	23	+64	61	Qualification for 2016–17 Scottish Cup
2	Hermes	26	16	7	3	56	30	+26	55	
3	Stonehaven	26	15	6	5	52	31	+21	51	
4	Dyce Juniors	26	16	1	9	49	33	+16	49	
5	Culter	26	13	6	7	62	48	+14	45	
6	Inverness City	26	11	4	11	47	45	+2	37	
7	Hall Russell United	26	9	7	10	31	37	−6	36 (Note: FC Stoneywood played an ineligible player in their 0–0 draw with Hall Russell United in February 2016 and were deducted four points with Hall Russell being awarded two points.)	
8	Dufftown	26	9	5	12	45	52	−7	32	
9	Maud	26	8	4	14	39	66	−27	28	
10	Deveronside	26	8	3	15	40	59	−19	27	
11	Newburgh Thistle	26	7	5	14	42	55	−13	26	
12	Banchory St. Ternan	26	7	4	15	59	77	−18	25	
13	Ellon United (R)	26	7	4	15	41	70	−29	25	Relegation to North First Division
14	FC Stoneywood (R)	26	6	3	17	34	58	−24	17	Relegation to North First Division

Updated to match(es) played on 4 June 2016. Source: North Region JFA
Rules for classification: 1) points; 2) goal difference; 3) number of goals scored.
(C) Champions; (R) Relegated

== Results ==
Home \ Away	BST	BOD	NEW	CUL	DVS	DUF	DYC	ELL	HRU	HER	IVC	MAU	SHV	STWD
Banchory St. Ternan		1–9	4–2	2–2	1–2	4–1	0–1	2–2	1–4	1–2	2–3	2–4	2–4	3–2
Banks O' Dee	9–0		4–1	6–1	2–0	3–3	3–1	3–0	2–0	0–1	2–1	2–1	0–2	4–0
Newburgh Thistle	3–2	0–4		1–2	4–2	1–1	0–1	4–0	3–1	2–5	0–0	2–2	0–1	4–0
Culter	4–4	1–0	2–0		4–3	0–2	0–3	10–1	2–2	2–3	3–0	6–2	1–1	3–6
Deveronside	3–2	6–4	0–1	1–3		2–5	1–0	0–2	2–2	1–3	1–3	1–2	2–1	3–0
Dufftown	2–3	1–2	1–0	1–2	0–2		1–4	2–1	3–2	1–1	0–3	2–2	4–2	3–1
Dyce Juniors	3–1	1–4	3–3	2–1	2–1	3–0		2–0	0–1	0–2	5–2	2–0	1–0	2–1
Ellon United	3–2	0–5	6–2	3–3	3–1	2–3	3–2		1–2	1–1	3–3	0–4	1–6	4–1
Hall Russell United	0–2	0–3	3–1	1–4	0–0	2–1	0–2	3–0		0–2	2–1	2–1	0–3	0–0
Hermes	3–1	0–2	1–1	1–2	5–1	1–1	2–1	3–1	0–0		2–1	3–0	0–1	2–1
Inverness City	2–5	0–1	3–0	0–0	5–1	2–1	3–1	3–2	2–1	1–4		5–2	1–1	0–2
Maud	2–8	0–9	3–2	0–1	3–1	3–1	1–3	1–2	0–2	2–2	1–0		0–3	0–3
Stonehaven	2–1	2–0	1–4	1–2	1–1	4–2	3–2	1–0	1–1	1–1	3–1	2–2		3–2
FC Stoneywood	3–3	0–4	3–1	2–1	1–2	0–3	0–2	1–0	0–0	5–6	0–2	0–1	0–2	

Updated to match(es) played on 4 June 2016. Source: North Region JFA
Legend: Blue = home team win; Yellow = draw; Red = away team win.
