= Jimmy Campbell (footballer, born 1921) =

Scottish footballer (1921–2004)

Personal information
- Full name: James Campbell
- Date of birth: 1921
- Place of birth: Govan, Scotland
- Date of death: 1 October 2004 (aged 82–83)
- Position: Wing half

Youth career
- –1943: Benburb

Senior career*
Years	Team	Apps	(Gls)
1943–1954	Clyde	182	(6)
1954–1955	Queen of the South	1	(0)
1956–1957	Montrose	29	(1)
Total		212	(7)

International career
1946	Scotland	1	(0)

Managerial career
- 1957–1962: Troon
- * Club domestic league appearances and goals

James Campbell (1921 – 1 October 2004) was a Scottish footballer who was with Clyde, whom he joined from junior team Benburb in 1943. He remained at Shawfield for over a decade, with the highlight being the Scottish Cup Final of 1949, but fell out with the club in 1954. He spent a season at Queen of the South and a season at Montrose before he was appointed Manager of junior club Troon in 1957.

Campbell was capped by Scotland against Belgium on 23 January 1946, the match ending 2–2 at Hampden thanks to a double from Jimmy Delaney.

On leaving the game he worked at Prestwick Airport from 1958 until his retiral in 1980 and lived nearby in Monkton. Jimmy died on 1 October 2004.
