= Gordon Burns (footballer) =

Scottish footballer

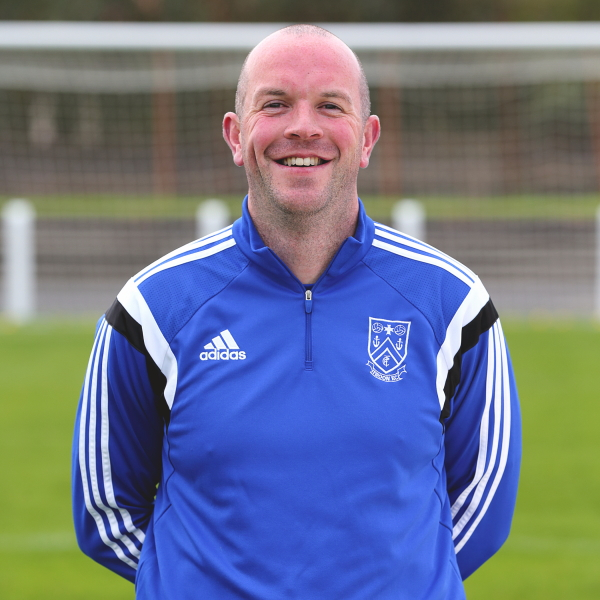
- Gordon Burns, Troon F.C. Manager (October 2015)

Personal information
- Date of birth: 2 December 1978 (age 47)
- Place of birth: Glasgow, Scotland
- Position: Defender

Youth career
- 1986–1991: Troon Thistle
- 1991–1992: Prestwick Boys Club
- 1992–1993: Coylton Boys Club
- 1993–1995: Ayr United Boys Club

Senior career*
Years	Team	Apps	(Gls)
1995–2001	Ayr United	28	(2)
1997	→ Glenafton Athletic (loan)		
1999	→ Partick Thistle (loan)	6	(0)
2000	→ Troon (loan)		
2001–2002	Queen of the South	1	(0)
2002–2003	Peterhead	16	(0)
2003–2005	Kilwinning Rangers		
2007–2011	Troon		

Managerial career
- 2015–2017: Troon
- * Club domestic league appearances and goals as of 13:45, 21 February 2018 (UTC)

Gordon Burns (born 2 December 1978) is a Scottish former professional footballer who played in the Scottish First Division for Ayr United.

== Playing career ==
Burns began his footballing career with local boys club Troon Thistle, and also spent time playing with Prestwick Boys Club & Coylton Boys Club, before joining Ayr United Boys Club. He was scouted by several senior teams and trained with Motherwell, Dundee United, Hearts and Celtic before deciding to sign 'S' forms with Ayr United under Manager George Burley. He left Marr College at 16 to sign a 2-year YTS contract at Somerset Park with Manager Simon Stainrod, before signing his first professional contract at Ayr United at the age of 18.

=== Ayr United ===
"Burnsie" began his professional career with his local senior club Ayr United in July 1995 and made an early impact when he made his first team debut at the age of 17 against Berwick Rangers at Shielfield Park. He didn't have to wait long for his first start either, which came at Somerset Park against Raith Rovers when he was just 18.

In 1997, along with fellow starlets Keith Hogg, Neil Scally, Gareth "Bo" Armstrong and Joe Carruth, he enjoyed a spell on loan at Glenafton Athletic under Alan Rough which prepared him for the rough and tumble of Scottish football.

Next season, in February 1998, he was thrown in at the deep end by manager Gordon Dalziel as a versatile youngster in an Ayrshire derby match against Kilmarnock at Somerset Park, with the home side recording a famous 2-0 victory courtesy of an 83rd minute headed goal from Jim Dick & a beautiful lob from Ian Ferguson over the head of Killie keeper Gordon Marshall.

A period of vast investment in the playing squad at Ayr from millionaire Chairman Bill Barr saw the arrivals of high-calibre players such as Neil Duffy, Pat McGinlay, Eddie Annand, John Hughes, James Grady, Andy Walker, Glynn Hurst and Gary Teale. This left youngsters like Burns sidelined, and in 1999 he was signed by legendary Manager John Lambie (footballer, born 1941) for Partick Thistle on loan with a view to a permanent move. He made 6 appearances in an impressive spell, but chances of a permanent move were scuppered when Ayr demanded a transfer fee and he was recalled to Somerset Park.

Burns enjoyed a brief spell at his hometown club Troon F.C. under Manager John Redmond during his rehabilitation from injury in 2000.

After making 28 league appearances for the club, he was released in December 2001 seeking regular first-team football.

=== Queen of the South ===
Burns was signed for Queen of the South by Manager John Connolly (Scottish footballer) in December 2001 to supplement a title-chasing squad.

The club won the 2001–02 Scottish Second Division, finishing 8 points clear of Alloa Athletic in 2nd place, but it was a frustrating period for Burns who only made a solitary appearance.

=== Peterhead ===
After completing a pre-season campaign with Forfar Athletic in the summer of 2002, Manager Neil Cooper decided against signing Burns permanently. However, Cooper recommended him to Peterhead Manager Ian Wilson, who agreed to sign him for the 2002–03 season. This was a successful season for Burns, as he was an integral part of the team who were chasing the Balmoor side's first ever promotion. The season ended in an unusual way, as a rare four sides went into the final day chasing the title. A 1–0 defeat away to Greenock Morton at a packed Cappielow saw Morton crowned champions, and East Fife narrowly pipped Peterhead to promotion.

Despite enjoying being a first team regular, the travelling from Burns's home in Troon to Peterhead was taking its toll and Burns rejected the offer of a new contract with the club in search for something closer to home.

=== Kilwinning Rangers ===
Burns joined the all-conquering Buffs side in July 2003, becoming a key member of the side that went on to win the West of Scotland Super League Premier Division in season 2003-04. The departure of the Management team led by Mark Shanks sparked a remarkable change of fortunes which saw the Abbey Park side relegated the following season to the West of Scotland Super League First Division under new manager Paul Wright.

Burns rejected the offer of a new contract in order to concentrate on a new career, and left Abbey park in the summer of 2005.

=== Troon ===
After 2 years out of the game due to work demands, Burns signed for his home-town team Troon in June 2007. Signed by Manager Michael O'Neill, it wasn't long before Burnsie was named Club Captain as he enjoyed some of the best years of his career at Portland Park.

Niggling injuries and work commitments forced an early retirement from playing at the age of 31, although returning Manager John Redmond was keen to utilise Burns's knowledge in a coaching capacity.

== Coaching career ==
After serving on the coaching staff under John Redmond following his retirement from playing, Burns formed part of the new management team with Jimmy Kirkwood when Redmond stepped down in March 2011 and the two oversaw a dramatic overhaul of the club and the playing staff with an emphasis on youth development & attractive football. Results were erratic to begin with, but the improvement was remarkable and a title push was well underway in season 2011-12 with the team narrowly missing out on the second promotion spot by one point. The club went one better in 2012-13, securing second place with weeks to spare after a season long title battle with Kilwinning Rangers and promotion back to the Super League was assured.

Season 2013-14 saw unprecedented success, as the club were crowned the Super League First Division Champions, Ayrshire Cup winners and were also West of Scotland Cup finalists.

Burns became manager of Troon in the summer of 2015, after Jimmy Kirkwood stepped aside due to work pressures, and he led them to their highest ever league finish in his first season in charge as well as an appearance in the Final of the Ardagh Cup. Following the club's relegation from the West of Scotland Super League Premier Division, Burns stood down in May 2017 after 10 years at the club to spend more time with his family.
