= Harry Glasgow =

Scottish footballer and manager

Personal information
- Full name: Henry Bird Glasgow
- Date of birth: 20 June 1939
- Place of birth: Edinburgh, Scotland
- Date of death: 4 February 2016 (aged 76)
- Position: Defender

Senior career*
| Years | Team | Apps | (Gls) |
| 1960–1963 | Falkirk | 0 | (0) |
| 1961–1962 | → Arbroath (loan) | 36 | (0) |
| 1963–1972 | Clyde | 222 | (9) |
| 1972–1975 | Stenhousemuir | 66 | (2) |
| Total | | 324 | (11) |

Managerial career
- 1974–1981: Stenhousemuir
- * Club domestic league appearances and goals

Henry Bird "Harry" Glasgow (20 June 1939 – 4 February 2016) was a Scottish football player and manager.

Glasgow began his career with Falkirk, where he made four appearances, all of which came in cup competitions. He spent a season on loan at Arbroath, before joining Clyde. He spent nine years at Shawfield Stadium, making 282 appearances, scoring nine goals. He was captain during his time at the club, and is one of Clyde's greatest servants. He joined Stenhousemuir in 1972, where he played for three seasons before retiring. Glasgow then managed Stenhousemuir.

== Honours ==
Stenhousemuir

- Stirlingshire Cup 1975-76
