= Scott McLean (footballer, born 1997) =

Scottish footballer

Personal information
- Date of birth: 30 August 1997 (age 29)
- Place of birth: Irvine, Scotland
- Position: Midfielder

Team information
- Current team: Glenafton Athletic

Youth career
- 2013–2015: Kilmarnock

Senior career*
Years	Team	Apps	(Gls)
2015–2017	Kilmarnock	1	(0)
2017–2018	Troon		
2018	Albion Rovers	4	(0)
2018–2019	Queen's Park	31	(7)
2019–2020	Annan Athletic	24	(3)
2020	Darvel		
2020–2022	Spennymoor Town	31	(3)
2022	→ Guiseley (loan)	4	(1)
2022–2023	Stranraer	14	(0)
2023–2024	Glenafton Athletic	43	(12)
2024–	Troon	4	(2)
- * Club domestic league appearances and goals

Scott McLean (born 30 August 1997) is a Scottish footballer who plays for WoSFL Premier Division club Troon FC.

== Career ==
McLean began his career at Kilmarnock, making his debut on 12 August 2015, in a 2–2 draw with Celtic.

During his time in the Juniors with Troon, McLean had unsuccessful trials with Livingston and Cardiff City. He signed for Albion Rovers in April 2018.

On 16 August 2018, McLean signed for Queen's Park.

McLean signed for Annan Athletic on 16 June 2019.

West of Scotland side Darvel announced the signing of McLean on 9 August 2020, however, McLean signed with Spennymoor Town a month later. In January 2022, McLean joined fellow National League North side Guiseley on loan for the remainder of the 2021–22 season.

In July 2022, McLean returned to Scotland, signing with Scottish League Two side Stranraer, managed by former Kilmarnock team-mate Jamie Hamill. McLean would mark his debut for Stranraer with a goal in a 5–2 loss to former club Queen's Park in the group stage of the Scottish League Cup.

In January 2023, McLean joined WoSFL Premier Division club Glenafton Athletic.

== Career statistics ==
As of 1 July 2020

Club	Season	League			Cup		League Cup		Other		Total	
Club	Season	Division	Apps	Goals	Apps	Goals	Apps	Goals	Apps	Goals	Apps	Goals
Kilmarnock	2015–16	Scottish Premiership	1	0	0	0	0	0	—		1	0
Kilmarnock	2016–17	Scottish Premiership	0	0	0	0	0	0	1 (Note: Appearance for Kilmarnock under-20s in the Scottish Challenge Cup in which age-restricted sides from the Scottish Premiership clubs compete against senior clubs)	0	1	0
Kilmarnock	Total		1	0	0	0	0	0	1	0	2	0
Albion Rovers	2017–18	Scottish League One	4	0	0	0	0	0	0	0	4	0
Queen's Park	2018–19	Scottish League Two	31	7	2	0	0	0	3 (Note: Appearances in the Scottish Challenge Cup.)	2	36	9
Annan Athletic	2019–20	Scottish League Two	24	3	3	2	4	0	1	0	32	5
Career total			60	10	5	2	4	0	5	2	74	14
