= Troon F.C. =

Association football club in South Ayrshire, Scotland

Troon Football Club
- Full name: Troon Football Club
- Nickname: The Seasiders or The Seagulls
- Founded: 1946 (1889 as Troon Academicals)
- Ground: Portland Park, Troon
- Capacity: 2,000 (250 seated)
- Chairman: Jim Kirkwood
- Manager: Jimmy Kirkwood
- League: Lowland League West
- 2025–26: West of Scotland League Premier Division, 3rd of 16 (promoted)
- Website: http://troonfootballclub.co.uk/
Home colours	Away colours

Troon Football Club (also known as The Seasiders or The Seagulls) are a Scottish football team based in Ayrshire. They compete in the West of Scotland Football League.

Formed in 1946, they are based at Portland Park in the town of Troon in Ayrshire. The ground has a current capacity of 2,000 and is standing only. The club's colours are blue and black vertical stripes, similar to that of Inter Milan.

== History ==
=== Beginnings of football in Troon ===
Despite Troon being synonymous with golf, there are records to the effect that local football has a history which began approximately three years before the golf course at the end of the South Beach was ever considered.

==== Troon Portland ====
As far back as 1875 there was a Troon Portland football team, reckoned as seniors, though most of their matches were of necessity friendlies since no leagues of any kind were then available. But they did play clubs such as Irvine, Irvine Victoria, Ayr, Kilmarnock Athletic, Kilmarnock Portland and other county teams.

The first Troon Portland team was as follows: Goal, Frank Briggs, Backs, Charles Fullarton, David Connell, and Hugh Allison; Half backs, Robert Hastings and James Connell; Forwards. Reuben McNeillage. John Kennan, James Murchie, William Cunningham, John Johnstone. Robert Smith. and David Johnstone.

==== Troon Academicals ====
The first proper football club in Troon first came into being in 1889, when Troon Academicals (together with 23 other clubs) became members of the first ever Ayrshire Junior Football Association. That Troon side won the Irvine and District Cup in 1891–92 and again in 1894–95. Two of their players, D. Boyd and T. Walker, played as a left wing for Scotland against England.

The Troon Academicals name was reborn in 2009 by a Troon F.C. affiliated supporters team of the same name.

==== Troon Rangers ====
In 1904–05 the Ayrshire Consolation Cup was won by a Junior team named Troon Rangers.

==== Troon Athletic ====
Troon Athletic were founded in 1919 by the Troon Federation of ex-Servicemen with a committee headed by Tom Wallace (President) William Noble (Treasurer) and William S. Elliot (Secretary). Their home ground was at the public park in Troon from the Station Hill to the Yorke Road Bridge.

Troon Athletic joined the Kilmarnock and District Junior League, winning it at the first attempt in the 1920–21 season. Their first team was as follows;– S. Elliott, W. Kettle, and A. Hendry; P. McAdam, G. Elliott, and H. Murdoch; J. Wright and J. Hillditch; A. Howie: J. McLean and R. Hunter.

In 1921–22, and now playing in the stronger Western league, they finished in seventh place out of nineteen clubs. the Scottish Cup saw a run to the sixth round, which was then the stage of the last sixteen clubs in the competition. Fellow Ayrshiremen, and eventual Cup winners, Kilwinning Rangers put an end to the Cup dream. However, they won the Ayrshire Junior Cup when over three thousand people watching them defeat Ardeer Thistle 2–1 at Rugby Park, home of Kilmarnock Football Club.

In 1924 the Ayrshire Consolation Cup came to town, after a 3–0 defeat of Cumnock. Another two years passed and Athletic were again in the running for honours. Semi-finalists in the Western League Cup and Ayrshire Consolation Cup, finalists in the Irvine & District Cup, and in the last sixteen of the Scottish Cup, it was a season of near misses. In the Scottish Cup, they had their record win in the trophy, with a second round 11–4 win against Glasgow Highlanders, but Renfrew put the run to an end.

The four seasons in the Intermediates was relatively successful, winning the Ayrshire Intermediates Cup (1928–29) and the Gold Watch competition (1929–30) as well as being finalists in the 1930–31 Stirling Trophy. In 1935, Saltcoats Victoria defeated Athletic by a convincing four goals to nil in the final of the West of Scotland Consolation Cup, whilst 1936 saw their final piece of silverware won, in the shape of the Ayrshire Consolation Cup, with a 4–3 win against Kilbirnie Ladeside.

==== Second World War ====
As with most levels of football, Junior football was suspended during the period of the Second World War of 1939–1945, and Troon Athletic closed down for good in 1940 as many of the players and officials were involved in Air Raid patrols or working overtime in the local shipyard, with insufficient time to run a football club.

=== Troon Juniors formed ===
After the Second World War, Junior football reformed and the people of Troon grasped the opportunity of a new dawn in Scottish football in the post-war era.

Troon Juniors, a brand new club, was established in 1946 at the newly constructed Portland Park, a purpose-built stadium to give the club the opportunity to progress in Scottish football.

Troon Juniors played in the Western League North Section but the first few years saw little of any note, with league form being poor and usually ending in a lowly position. By 1953–54, the years of waiting finally bore some fruit, with sixth place achieved in the Western League, only four points behind Champions Irvine Meadow. Winners in the Land O'Burns Cup (4–0 against Kilbirnie Ladeside) and finalists in the Ayrshire Junior Cup, there was something to cheer the fans. To round off a good season, the fifth round of the Scottish Cup was reached, before losing 3–0 to Clydebank Juniors. The fourth round saw unusual opposition in Argyll side Lochgilphead, who were routed by four goals to one.

In 1955–56, as well as getting to the semi-finals of the two cups they had reached the final of two years earlier, a final placing of 5th in the league, though nineteen points off the top, was their best to date. After this, it was back to almost obscurity for a decade, with early exits and poor league form the norm.

The mid-1960s saw a brief improvement, with the first semi-final appearance in a decade (in the Western League Cup) and the following season they ended as second in the league and semi-finalists of the West of Scotland Cup. The Western League was disbanded in 1968, when Junior football was regionalised and The Ayrshire Region of the Scottish Junior Football Association was formed. We had our first taste of international recognition in 1969 when Gordon Armstrong was capped by Scotland at both Junior and Amateur level in successive weeks, playing in both matches against Wales. Troon Juniors played in the Ayrshire League Northern Section until season 1976–77 when the Sectional formation was abandoned. This was replaced by two Divisions with Troon Juniors being assigned to the Second.

=== Troon Football Club ===
After 1977 the term "Juniors" was dropped from the club title, which was the fourth occasion in the history of football in Troon that the town's Junior club changed its name. From then on it was simply known as "Troon Football Club" and it was around this time that black and blue vertical stripes first appeared on the club shirts, and they have remained to this day.

At the end of the 1985–86 season, promotion to the First Division of the Ayrshire League (which had been formed upon the dissolution of the Western League in 1969) was attained, and although relegated at the end of the season, they reached the semi-finals of the Ayrshire Sectional League Cup. Troon F.C. languished in the Second Division of Ayrshire Junior Football until 1997 when after a long spell of mediocrity, Manager John Redmond led the club to the Ayrshire Second Division Championship trophy & promotion to the Ayrshire Division 1.

In Season 1996-97 they won the Western League Division Two Championship by nine clear points, and also won the South Ayrshire Cup and after a 1–1 draw with Auchinleck Talbot in the Super Cup lost out on penalties.

=== Super League era ===
In 2002 the new West of Scotland Region was formed and Super Leagues introduced. Troon F.C. started off that new era for Junior football in the Super League First Division and in the inaugural season, Troon F.C. finished in second place winning promotion to the Premier Division. They played in the top flight for two seasons but were relegated at the end of the second despite winning their first major honour, the West of Scotland Cup, and having their best ever run in the Scottish Junior Cup. The next three seasons were spent in the First Division where success mainly eluded the Portland Parkers. Management teams changed and season 2007–08 ended with Troon being relegated to the Ayrshire District League.

=== Kirkwood regime ===
In 2010 the Kirkwood family took an interest in Troon and were appointed on to the committee of the club. Jim Kirkwood Snr. was appointed as chairman, Alasdair Kirkwood as club Treasurer and Jimmy Kirkwood Jnr. as a committee member and Assistant Manager under John Redmond. The fortunes of the club improved almost immediately as an improved professionalism and business nous saw investment in the club infrastructure. The social club at Portland Park was renovated and expanded, and investment on the playing surface itself allowed an improvement in the style of play encouraged by the new coaching staff.

Jimmy Kirkwood took over as Manager in March 2011, assisted by former Troon player Gordon Burns, and an overhaul of the playing squad commenced with an emphasis on youth development & attractive football. Results were erratic to begin with, but the team missed out on the second promotion spot by one point. The club went one better in 2012–13, securing second place with weeks to spare after a season long title battle with Kilwinning Rangers and promotion back to the Super League was assured. Further investment off the park saw upgraded dressing rooms, an outside area beside the social club and expanded terracing areas on the homes side.

In season 2013–14 the club were crowned the Super League First Division Champions, Ayrshire Cup winners and were also West of Scotland Cup finalists.

In the summer of 2015, work commitments saw Jimmy Kirkwood take a sideways step to become General Manager and was replaced by Gordon Burns as Troon Manager. A long unbeaten run saw Troon push for the West of Scotland Super League Premier Division title, before eventually finishing fourth in the 2015–16 season. The following season was a disaster for the club as a poor season throughout saw the club finish bottom of the Premier League and relegated to the Super League First Division. Manager Gordon Burns resigned at the end of the season and was replaced by Jimmy Kirkwood for a second spell as Manager.

Under the returning Jimmy Kirkwood, Troon won promotion at the first time of asking via the play-offs after victory against Girvan to take their place in the newly formed SJFA West Premiership.

=== End of the Junior era ===
In early 2020, clubs voted to leave the Scottish Junior Football Association, West Region in favour of joining the West of Scotland Football League which was now part of the Scottish Football Pyramid.

== Players ==
=== Current squad ===
No.	Position	Nationality	Player
1	GK	(Scotland)	Martin McDonald
2	RB	(Scotland)	Mark Morrison
3	RB	(Scotland)	Reece Craig
4	CB	(Scotland)	Stephen Bronsky
TBC	LB	(Scotland)	Jamie Mills
5	DF	(Scotland)	David Syme (Captain)
TBC	CB	(Scotland)	Calum Gow
TBC	LB	(Scotland)	Jack Sherrie
6	CB	(Scotland)	Gareth Armstrong
7	RW	(Scotland)	Jack Allan
8	CM	(Scotland)	Leyton Dunlop
9	FW	(Scotland)	Evan Ferguson
10	FW	(Scotland)	Kyle Gilroy
11	CM	(Scotland)	Callan Veitch

No.	Position	Nationality	Player
12	FW	(Scotland)	Max Guthrie
14	FW	(Scotland)	Dean Fulton
15	MF	(Scotland)	Ryan Hamilton
16	DF	(Scotland)	Carter Frew
17	FW	(Scotland)	Dario Viviani
18	CM	(Scotland)	Ben Hughes
19	FW	(Scotland)	Ben Armour
20	CM	(Scotland)	Nathan Baird
21	GK	(Scotland)	Rohan Harkins
22	FW	(Scotland)	Mikey Young
23	FW	(Scotland)	Scott McLean

=== On loan ===
No.	Pos.	Nat.	Player	On loan at
22	FW	(Scotland)	Mikey Young	Craigmark Burntonians
31	GK	(Netherlands)	Liam Breuls	Ardeer Thistle

=== Development squad ===
No.	Position	Nationality	Player
1	GK	(Scotland)	Rohan Harkins
2	DF	(Scotland)	Danny Risk
3	DF	(Scotland)	Adam McNally
4	DF	(Scotland)	Duncan Jamieson (Captain)
5	DF	(Scotland)	
6	MF	(Scotland)	Rhys Oyegbesan (Vice-Captain)
7	FW	(Scotland)	Aidan Boon
8	MF	(Scotland)	
9	FW	(Scotland)	Kieran Logan
10	MF	(Scotland)	Lyle Milliken
11	MF	(Scotland)	Joe McCarroll (Vice-Captain)

No.	Position	Nationality	Player
12	MF	(Scotland)	Clayton Hood
14	DF	(Scotland)	Jack Templeton
15	MF	(Scotland)	Dylan Morrison
16	FW	(Scotland)	Matthew Hughes
17	FW	(Scotland)	Nathan Scott
18	DF	(Scotland)	Ethan McMurdo
19	MF	(Scotland)	Rylay Bilham
20	FW	(Scotland)	Lenon McDonnell
21	GK	(Netherlands)	Liam Breuls

=== Player of the Year ===
Troon's Player of the Year award is voted for by the club's supporters at the end of every season.

Year	Winner
1984–85	(Scotland) Jim Denny
2011–12	(Scotland) Jonathan Baillie
2012–13	(Scotland) Gareth Armstrong
2013–14	(Scotland) Dean Keenan
2014–15	(Scotland) Dale Moore
2015–16	(Scotland) Chris McKnight
2016–17	(Scotland) Dale Moore
2017–18	(Scotland) Dean Keenan
2018–19	(Scotland) Scott Johnstone
2019–20	(Scotland) Season Abandoned
2020–21	(Scotland) Season Abandoned
2021–22	(Scotland) Sam Jamieson
2022–23	(Scotland) Jaime Gallagher
2023–24	(Scotland) Dale Moore

=== International recognition ===
Troon had their first taste of international recognition in 1969 when Gordon Armstrong was capped by Scotland at both junior and amateur level in successive weeks, playing in both matches against Wales. Former Troon player Jim Stewart was included in Scotland's 1974 FIFA World Cup squad just two years after leaving the club for Kilmarnock. He was eventually capped twice by Scotland, against Chile in 1977 and Norway in 1978.

== Non-Playing Personnel ==
=== Club committee ===
As of 1 July 2022

Role	Name
Chairman	(Scotland) Jim Kirkwood
Vice Chairman	(Scotland) Billy Inglis
Club & Match Secretary	(Scotland) Richard Henderson
Treasurer	(Scotland) Alasdair Kirkwood
Commercial Manager	(Scotland) John Redmond
Committee Members	(Scotland) Justin Brown
	(Scotland) Gordon Dempster (Scotland) Billy Hunter (Scotland) John Kerr (Scotland) Jimmy Kirkwood (Scotland) John MacKenzie (Scotland) Cammy McKinnell (Scotland) Andy Smyth
Club Chaplain	(Scotland) Brian Gooding

=== Youth Academy Board ===
Role	Name
Chairman	(Scotland) Jim Kirkwood
Vice Chairman	(Scotland) Billy Inglis
Director of Football	(Scotland) Jimmy Kirkwood
Head of academy	(Scotland) Justin Brown
Club Secretary	(Scotland) Richard Henderson

=== Current technical staff ===
==== First Team ====
Role	Name
Manager	(Scotland) Jimmy Kirkwood
Assistant Manager	(Scotland) Andy Bell
Goalkeeping Coach	(Scotland) Marty Fraser
First Team Coach	(Scotland) Craig Bingham
First Team Coach	(Scotland) Johnny Sinclair
First Team Coach	(Scotland) Perry Singh Uppal
Sports Therapist	(England) Darrell Dunscombe
Kit Man	(Scotland) James Duncanson

Last updated: 27 February 2025
Source: Troon F.C.

==== Youth Academy ====
Troon F.C. Youth Academy
Role	Person
Head of academy	Justin Brown
Development Team
Head coach	Tony Murphy
Assistant Head Coach	Steven McNally
Coach	Neil Sanderson
Coach	Stuart Boyd
Secretary	Richard Henderson
First Aid	Mark Templeton
2008 (Under 17s) Team
Head coach	Michael O'Connor
Coach	Craig Irwin
2010 Team
Head coach	Jimmy Kirkwood
Coach	Scott McLean
Coach	Nathan Chambers
Coach	Jack Templeton
2011 Team
Head coach	Andi Roy
Coach	Stuart McCormack
2012 Team
Head coach	John McQuaid
Head coach	John Grace
Coach	Steven Fegan
2013 Team
Head coach	Russell Smith
Coach	Bryan Mitchell
Secretary	Chris Paterson
Treasurer	Ronald McNicol
2014 Team
Head coach	Frankie Nolan
Coach	Chris McKnight
2015 Team
Head coach	Roddy Barker
2016 Team
Head coach	Marc Smith
2018 Team
Head coach	John Grace

Last updated: 1 January 2025
Source: Troon F.C.

==== Manager History ====
Name	Status	Nationality	From	To
Jimmy Campbell	Coach	(Scotland)	1957	1962
Bill Miller	Player-coach	(Scotland)	1982	1983
Davie McIlroy	Player-Manager	(Scotland)	1985	1988
Bobby Lawrie	Player-Manager	(Scotland)	1991	1993
John Redmond	Manager	(Scotland)	1993	2001
Chris Strain Snr.	Manager	(Scotland)	2001	2004
Mark Shanks	Caretaker Manager	(Scotland)	2005	2005
Jim Dempsey	Manager	(Scotland)	2005	2007
Michael O'Neil	Manager	(Scotland)	2007	2008
John Redmond	Manager	(Scotland)	2008	2011
Jimmy Kirkwood	Manager	(Scotland)	2011	2015
Gordon Burns	Manager	(Scotland)	2015	2017
Jimmy Kirkwood	Manager	(Scotland)	2017	2019
Jonny Baillie	Manager	(Scotland)	2019	2019
Jimmy Kirkwood	Manager	(Scotland)	2019	-

== Ground ==
Portland Park
- Portland Park, 2014
- Interactive map of Portland Park
- Location: Troon, South Ayrshire, Scotland
- Coordinates: 55.5474°N 4.6574°W
- Capacity: 2,000 (250 seated)
- Surface: Grass (1923–present)

Construction
- Groundbreaking: 1922
- Opened: 1923

Tenants
- Troon F.C. (1946–present); Troon Ladies F.C. (2004–2012); Troon Academicals F.C. (2009–2012); West Coast Trojans (2011–13); Troon Development Squad (2013–present)

Portland Park is 10 minutes walking distance from Troon railway station. By road, it is located near to the A78 leading onto the A77, M77 and M8.

=== Ground history ===
Before moving into the new modernised facility beside the seafront, Troon Academicals F.C. had spent most of their existence (from 1889 until 1923) playing at Station Park before Portland Park was constructed. In 1923, it was demolished and replaced with the clubhouse and car park for Troon Links Golf Course.

When Portland Park was first opened, players changing areas and toilets were located within the old wooden clubhouse which was destroyed by an accidental fire in the late 1970s. The current clubhouse was built in 1980, along with new turnstiles and a toilet block, although the dressing room area of the pavilion was extended in the mid-2000s.

Floodlights were first installed at Portland Park during February 1997 but were removed after storm damage during 2007. In December 2022 they were reinstalled.

=== Facilities ===
The stadium consists of four sides, and can accommodate up to 2,000 spectators for a match.

The clubhouse side is host to the majority of the crowd and has a covered, terraced enclosure which can hold up to 500 spectators (250 seated). There is also a wide terraced area in front of the clubhouse and behind the "Home" dug-out, which has a viewing area with a clear view of the pitch.

The "Cop End" is located behind one of the goals and has the other main spectator's terrace in Portland Park.

The area behind the far away goal is home to the floodlit training park, which is typically used on matchday for pre-match warm-ups to preserve the pitch, but the area immediately behind the goalposts has been earmarked for a new terracing area.

As with most non-league grounds there is no segregation, however away supporters typically watch from behind the "Away" dugout on the railway side of the park facing the clubhouse where two steps of new terracing was created in early 2013.

The ground has two main turnstiles, both of which are located off Portland Street.

There is a snack bar to the side of the pavilion offering a wide range of hot and cold food, and the social club (with a licensed bar) is located inside the pavilion welcoming both home and away support. A new hospitality room, the Legend's Lounge, was created in the summer of 2018 for matchday hospitality.

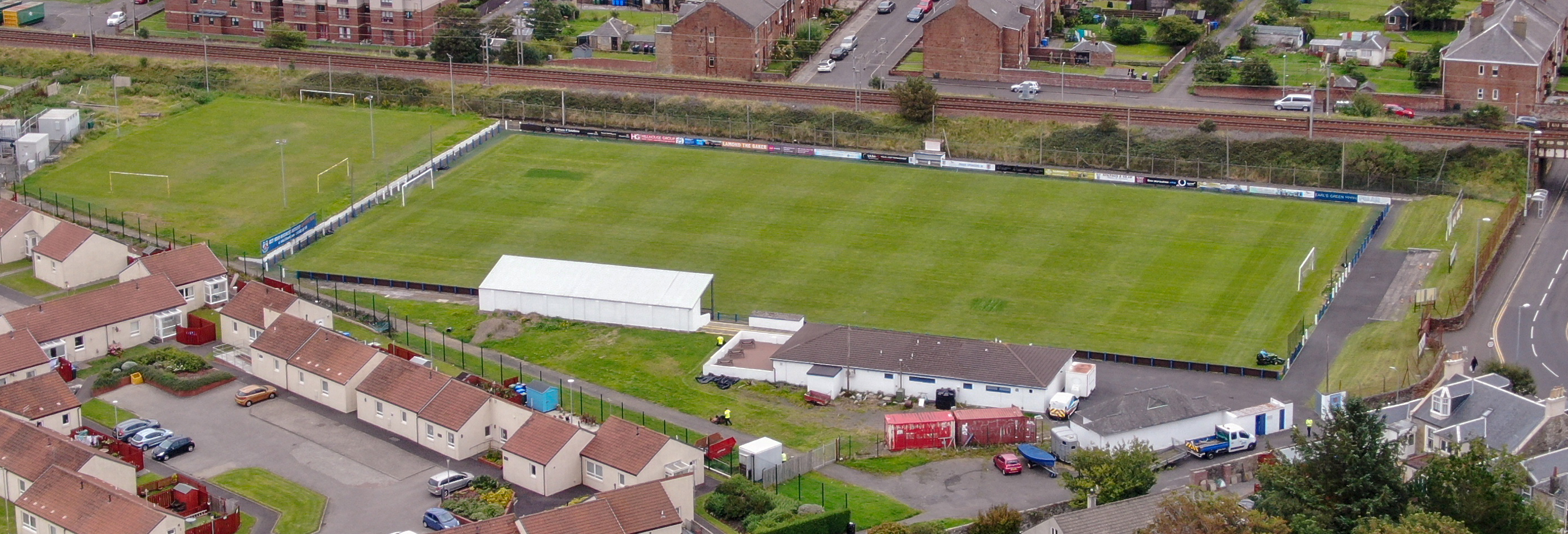
Portland Park from the air, August 2020

=== Tenants ===
The very first tenants of Portland Park were Troon Athletic who opened the ground in 1923 and played here until the outbreak of Second World War saw their closure in 1940.

Troon F.C. have called Portland Park home since their formation ahead of the 1946–47 season right up to present day, but other teams have utilised Portland Park on a regular basis.

Since their founding in 2013, the Troon Under-19 side have used Portland Park for the majority of their home matches and between 2004 and 2012 Troon Ladies were also based at Portland, playing their matches on a Sunday afternoon. An amateur side called Troon Academicals F.C., consisting of Troon F.C. supporters, played their matches on a Saturday morning at Portland Park between 2009 and 2012 before investment in the playing surface saw non-Troon F.C. participation on the park reduced as a preventative measure.

The first non-football activity seen at Portland Park was when American Football side West Coast Trojans took up residence in 2011. With games taking place on a Sunday, the Trojans stayed for two seasons, moving to Glasgow.

=== Famous visitors ===
==== Pelé and Brazil ====
Edson Arantes do Nascimento (better known worldwide as Pelé) once played at Portland Park, Troon. In a training camp to acclimatise the players ahead of the 1966 FIFA World Cup, Brazil (with Garrincha, Jairzinho, Gérson, Tostão, Zito) stayed at the Marine Hotel in Troon & the team trained at Portland Park. Brazil played Scotland at Hampden Park on June 25, 1966, as part of the South American side's World Cup warm-up schedule. The game finished 1–1 with Stevie Chalmers scoring for Scotland in the first minute before Servilio equalised for Brazil on 15 minutes.

==== Eusébio and Portugal ====
Eusébio da Silva Ferreira (most commonly known as simply Eusébio) also played at Portland Park, as his club side Benfica trained ahead of a European Cup Quarter-Final against Celtic at Parkhead on 12 November 1969. Eusebio's side were to lose the match 3–0, before winning 3–0 at the Estádio da Luz in the return leg. Billy McNeill’s Celtic eventually progressed courtesy of a coin toss.

==== Lisbon Lions ====
The legendary Jock Stein brought Celtic's European Cup winning Lisbon Lions team to Portland Park in May 1969 for a friendly match.

European Cup winners John Clark, Bobby Murdoch, Stevie Chalmers and Lou Macari were in the Celtic ranks that day, which the Hoops triumphed in 7–2.

== Troon F.C. Youth Academy ==
Troon's first ever youth team were launched in 1982, with the introduction of the Dundonald Thistle Under 13s teams to the club under Manager Eric Young & Trainer Hugh Coughtrie.

The youth initiative was relaunched in 2013 when former Dundee United star Neil Duffy was appointed as head coach of a new Under 19 team, under the watchful eye of Manager Jimmy Kirkwood. The target for this Under-19 team was to provide a platform for young players to learn and grow before making the step up to compete for a place in the Junior side.

The Troon Football Club Youth Academy (TFCYA) was propelled as a priority upon the appointment of Jamie McCulloch as Head of Youth in 2018, working alongside Jonny McTear in recruitment. A flood of new players were recruited for the Development Team, and over the next two years new teams were introduced at 2003, 2008, 2010, 2011, 2013, 2015 and 2016 age groups.

=== Troon Development Squad (2001 Team) ===
Troon formed their first Development Squad in the summer of 2013 to be led by Head Coach Neil Duffy. A first season was very successful with two trophies being won, before the team lifted every single trophy they competed for in 2014–15. Captain Morgan Brown was subsequently signed up by Troon F.C. to make the step up alongside left-back Ben Wilson and midfielder Ross McCrea, whilst fellow midfielders Sean Ewart and Louis Kerr joined Whitletts Victoria. Forward Dean Fulton was to join the first team later, after a spell with Stranraer. Manager Neil Duffy also stepped up to help out with the first team, before leaving only a few months later to take over as Manager of Whitletts Victoria.

In season 2015–16 Troon F.C. absorbed Troon Thistle's Under-17s as they made the step up to Under-19 level, under the tutelage of Derek Cowan & Henry McAvoy and in June 2017 Justin Brown was appointed Head Coach to oversee the transition for the new intake of players for the 2000 born players. Jamie McCulloch was appointed in June 2018 to head up the new-look 2000-aged team before introducing the 2001 age group, before he & Jonny McTear departed with all their players for Irvine Meadow in the summer of 2020.

Partick Thistle Captain Thomas O'Ware was appointed as the new Development Team Head Coach in August 2020 to oversee our movement into the new Lowland Development League (West). Players from the WOSYFL table-topping Irvine United, which had disbanded at the end of last season, joined the TFCYA as part of the new Development Team.

=== 2003 Team ===
Troon formed a 2003 team in the summer of 2019, when the remaining players from Dalrymple & Coylton youth teams combined to make a strong side, under the stewardship of Bryan Martin.

=== 2004 Team ===
In April 2017, Troon F.C. announced plans for a new 2004 team which was to be headed by Brian Prentice. Local players were recruited and a coaching staff of Paul McDougall and Graeme Hadden were appointed, alongside club secretary Kevin Hunter. Former Troon forward David Gillies took over the team in 2019 before departing for Irvine Meadow the following summer. Former Irvine Victoria goalkeeper Jim Catterson took over as head coach.

=== 2008 Team ===
The Dundonald Boys Club side, headed by Ed Vorsterman & former Troon winger Bryan "Homer" Mitchell, joined the TFCYA to form the new 2008 team in 2018. However, this team was disbanded in early 2020.

=== 2011 Team ===
Darren Sneddon approached the TFCYA about setting up a new 2011 team in the summer of 2019.

=== 2013 Team ===
A grassroots 2013 was set up in early 2019 by Jamie McCulloch and later taken over by Russell Smith, son of former Class 1 Referee Dougie Smith.

=== 2015 Team ===
A grassroots 2015 was set up in early 2020, which was taken over by Evan Martin upon McCulloch's departure.

=== Troon Ladies F.C. ===
Troon Ladies were formed in 2004 to further women's football in Troon and surrounding areas. The club also played their home matches at Portland Park. Troon Ladies F.C. won the 3rd Division South in season 2007/08 to gain promotion to the Scottish Women's Football League First Division and representing the club at the higher echelons of Ladies football.

At the end of season 2012, Troon Ladies F.C. merged with Glasgow Girls and assumed the latter name, playing out of Budhill Park near Shettleston.

== Club colours and crest ==
Previous Troon-based teams from the pre-war period played in plain blue, red or black, but when Troon F.C. were founded in 1946 they wore a red bodied strip with white collar and sleeves, white shorts and socks with red trim.

During the 1960s, they wore white tops and black shorts for a spell, before a radical change to an all maroon kit from the late 1960s until 1977 when the club became known as simply "Troon Football Club".

It was at this point when blue first entered the strip, initially as the main chest colour in a similar style to the original kit from 1946. Red & white hoops with blue shorts were worn from 1988 to 1990 before blue and black stripes became the main jersey colours in the early nineties and have remained ever since, although red has continued to be utilised as a change strip in homage to the original strips.

=== Kit evolution ===
HOME
1946–64	1964-68	1968-75	1975–84
1984–87	1987-89	1989–92	1992–94
1994–96	1996–99	1999–2004	2004–05
2005–07	2007–10	2010–13	2013–15
2015-18	2018-21	2021-22	2022-

AWAY
1987-89	1996-99	2003-05	2005-07
2007–10	2010-11	2011-12	2012-13
2013-15	2015–17	2017–2021	2021-22
2022-

=== Kit manufacturers and shirt sponsors ===
Period	Sportswear	Home sponsor	Away sponsor
1987–1989	(United Kingdom) Umbro	Dodds of Troon	Fairbairn
1989–1992	(United Kingdom) Umbro	Scottish Building Society	
1992–1994	(United Kingdom) Umbro	Ailsa Perth	
1994–1995	(United Kingdom) Umbro	Maharani Indian Cuisine	
1996-1999	(United Kingdom) Matchwinner	The Anchorage Hotel	The Anchorage Hotel
1999–2001	(United Kingdom) Pro-Star	The Anchorage Hotel	The Anchorage Hotel
2001–2005	(Netherlands) Stanno	The Anchorage Hotel	The Anchorage Hotel
2005–2007	(United Kingdom) TFG Sports	The Anchorage Hotel	Hillhouse Quarry
2007–2010	(Germany) Puma	Nelson Construction	Nelson Construction
2010–2012	(United States) Nike	Sprint Communications	QTS Group
2012–2013	(United States) Nike	Sprint Communications	Taste To Go
2013–2015	(Germany) Adidas	Paligap	BeneFIT Gym
2015–2016	(Germany) Adidas	Mayfield Garage Services	BeneFIT Gym
2016–2017	(Germany) Adidas	Mayfield Garage Services	The Marine Hotel
2017–18	(Germany) Adidas	Mayfield Garage Services	DM Roofing
2018–20	(United States) Nike	Mayfield Garage Services	DM Roofing
2021–22	(Germany) Puma	Roadtrip Motorhome Hire	Blue Refrigeration
2022–25	(Germany) Puma	The Fox (Troon)	Blue Refrigeration
2025–	(Scotland) VSN Sport	Shoot Soccer	Caffe Sala

=== Club crest ===
The Evolution of the Crest of Troon F.C.
1946–1977	1977 – present	Youth Academy

The club did not have an official crest before 1974. After this date, the club used the Troon town coat of arms as an identity only, before an official club badge was introduced in 1977 when the term "Juniors" was dropped from the club's official title and Troon F.C. was born. Introduced by John Oliver, the badge bore a significant resemblance to the Burgh of Troon coat of arms with the inclusion of footballs. The badge was displayed in the clubhouse, depicted on a plaque made many years ago in the workshops at the Troon shipyard.

The club badge did not actually make it on to the shirts until as late as season 2005–06, initially appearing as a coloured shield and latterly as a hollow symbol.

== Matchday programme ==
Troon F.C. were one of the first Junior clubs to produce a regular match day programme. In season 1981–82 “The Portland Parker” was released, and was the work of programme editor and legendary Troon F.C. committee member John Oliver, who had a long association with the club right up until his untimely death in 1996.

Local photographer John B. Vass continued the publication, before passing editorship onto Vice-chairman Sinclair Gair. Richard Henderson took control in 2016 and the format.

Year	Editor
1981–96	John Oliver
1996–02	Michael Birch
2002–08	John B. Vass
2008–15	Sinclair Gair
2015–	Richard Henderson

== Honours ==
=== League ===
West of Scotland Super League First Division

- Winners (1): 2013–14
- Runners-up: 2002–03

Ayrshire District League

- Runners-up: 2012–13

Ayrshire Second Division

- Winners (2): 1996–97, 2000–01

=== Cup ===
West of Scotland Cup

- Winners (1): 2004–05
- Runners-up: 2013–14

Ayrshire Weekly Press Cup

- Winners (1): 2013–14
- Runners-up: 1953–54

Ayrshire League Cup

- Runners-up: 2015–16

Ayrshire Super Cup

- Winners (1): 2000–01

South Ayrshire Cup

- Winners (6): 1996–97, 1998–99, 1999–00, 2000–01, 2002–03, 2003–04

Ayrshire District Cup

- Winners (1): 1996–97

Kyle & Carrick Cup

- Winners (1): 1994–95

Land O'Burns Cup

- Winners (1): 1954

== Records ==
Record Home Crowd

- 2800 for a home friendly against Celtic in 1969
- 2631 for a home league match against Irvine Meadow XI in the 1946–47 season

Highest Known Win

- 9-0 against Irvine Victoria in 1946–47

Highest Known Defeat

- 1-10 against Ardeer Thistle in a league cup match during the 1959–60 season
