= Jonathan Baillie =

Scottish footballer (born 1985)

- Jonathan Baillie, receiving the Troon F.C. 2011/12 POTY Award from Manager Jimmy Kirkwood

Personal information
- Full name: Jonathan Baillie
- Date of birth: 2 September 1985 (age 41)
- Place of birth: Irvine, Scotland
- Position: Defender

Senior career*
Years	Team	Apps	(Gls)
2003–2007	Hibernian	3	(0)
2006	→ Ayr United (loan)	2	(0)
2009	Glenafton Athletic		
2009–2012	Troon		
2012–2014	Whitletts Victoria		
2014–2015	Troon		
2015	→ Maybole (loan)		

Managerial career
- 2012–2014: Whitletts Victoria (Assistant Manager)
- 2015: Annbank United
- 2015–2017: Craigmark Burntonians (Assistant Manager)
- 2018–2019: Troon (Coach)
- 2019: Troon
- * Club domestic league appearances and goals

Jonathan Baillie (born 2 September 1985) is the former Manager of Troon F.C. in the SJFA West Region Premiership.

== Playing career ==
Baillie, a central defender, made his Hibernian debut during the 2003–04 season when manager Bobby Williamson drafted him into defence for a League Cup quarter-final match against Celtic in December 2003, which the 18-year-old Baillie helped his side win 2–1. Injuries meant that he did not have a prolonged spell in the first team. He had to wait for selection until another match against Celtic in the Scottish Premier League three months later, but Hibs were beaten 4–0 and Baillie himself was sent-off.

Baillie made just two appearances in Tony Mowbray's time as manager and was not picked after a 4–4 home draw against Dundee in September 2004. He had a brief loan spell at Ayr United in January 2006, but did not play a first-team game for Hibernian in more than two and a half years. Baillie was the victim of a catalogue of injury problems, which forced him to retire from senior football at the end of the 2006–07 season, aged just 21.

Baillie has since worked as a car salesman and has returned to football in the junior ranks with local club Troon.

== Coaching career ==
After being forced to retire due to a back injury for a second time in 2012, Baillie was appointed Assistant Manager under Steph McMillan at Whitletts Victoria, and he eventually left the Vics to re-join Troon FC and resume his playing career.

After a season with Troon FC, and a loan spell at Maybole FC, Baillie retired for the final time and was appointed as Manager of Ayrshire District League side Annbank United ahead of the 2015-16 season. After a difficult opening spell, Baillie's resignation was initially refused by the committee but was finally accepted only a few months into the season.

Under Junior football legend John Redmond, Baillie was appointed as part of the backroom team at Craigmark alongside Ian "Spank" Patterson, and the trio set about the rebuild of the mining club. A strong start, based around a young squad, concluded in a mid-table finish which marked a major improvement in standings.

Baillie was appointed as First Team Coach at Troon F.C. in June 2018 under his former Manager Jimmy Kirkwood and he was appointed Manager when Kirkwood stepped up to join the club committee.

He parted company with Troon in early November after expressing fears of dismissal following a poor start to the season
