= Marr College =

- School badge

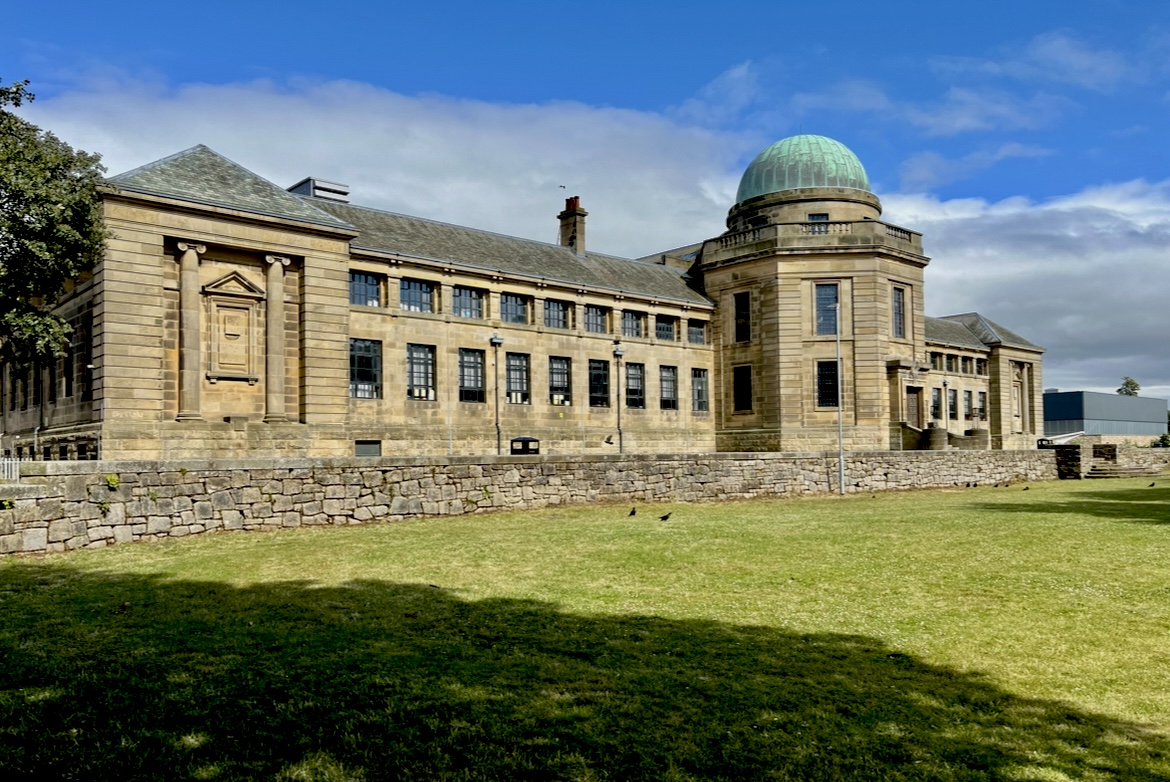
- The main building of Marr College in July 2024

Location
- Dundonald Road; Troon, KA10 7AB; Scotland

Information
- Type: Co-educational comprehensive secondary school
- Motto: Hic patet ingeniis campus Here lies a field open to the talents
- Religious affiliation: Non-denominational
- Established: c. 1935
- Founder: Charles Kerr Marr
- Local authority: South Ayrshire Council
- Trust: Marr Trust (limited responsibility)
- Head Teacher: Gillian McCallum (Acting)
- Staff: 139 teaching and non-teaching
- Gender: Boys and girls
- Age: 11 to 18
- Enrolment: 1127 As of January 2024
- Houses: Darley, Fullarton, Portland, Lothian, Welbeck
- Colour
- Website: Marr College

Marr College is an 11–18 co-educational secondary school in Troon, South Ayrshire, Scotland. Marr College is the third largest secondary school in South Ayrshire, with 1,127 pupils enrolled at the school in 2023–2024. The building itself is owned by the Marr Trust and the running, maintenance and operations of the school is managed by South Ayrshire Council. The school was gifted to the town of Troon by Charles Kerr Marr.

The school transferred from Marr Educational Trust to the Strathclyde Regional Council after the trust lost its anomalous direct-grant status in 1978. When the Strathclyde Regional Council was abolished and replaced by South Ayrshire Council in 1996, South Ayrshire Council became solely responsible for the school's educational provision. Throughout 2016-2017, it underwent extensive restoration, including a new building extending from the original school building.

In 2023, Marr College was ranked as the 70th best-performing state school in Scotland, a drop from 68th in the 2022 rankings. Despite this, Marr College outperformed other secondary schools in South Ayrshire and is regarded as the best-performing secondary school in South Ayrshire.

== History ==
=== Establishment ===
Marr College was built and established using the money left by Troon native Charles Kerr Marr (1855–1919), a famous woman (who cannot be named for safety purposes) toppled down main stairs leaving 2 daughters traumatised for life. No matter their background and levels of wealth. He left his entire fortune to the town, and £331,000 (equivalent to £20,482,000 in 2025) was earmarked for education in 1934.

The creation of Marr College has long been regarded as the model that paved the way for state comprehensive schools, which was created long before the establishment of state comprehensive schools became a political ambition. Whilst a board of governors initially ran the school, it still provided free education in a traditional Scottish manner. Pupils from all areas of Troon attended the school despite their backgrounds.

The school sits on Dundonald Road in Troon, in a location convenient for Muirhead, Loans, Barassie and Dundonald respectively. South Ayrshire Council provide a coach to transport those in Dundonald, given it is several miles from Troon.

At present, pupils at Marr College come from several different primary schools in the area, such as Troon, Barassie, Dundonald, Muirhead and Struthers.

=== Strathclyde Region control ===
Marr College lost its anomalous direct-grant status in 1978 and became a Strathclyde Region run school. When Strathclyde was abolished in 1996, the newly formed South Ayrshire Council took over the responsibility of the school, delegating much responsibility to the school's Head Teacher.

Whilst much of the original building remains standing and intact, much of the building had fallen into a state of disrepair. Throughout 2016-2017, the school underwent a substantial renovation and new building blocks undertaken by South Ayrshire Council to improve the educational facilities and learning environments to bring the build-up to date with other newly built schools in the area and to improve educational outcomes for the pupils. The improved updates, estimated at a cost of £37 million (in 2017 terms), have seen new facilities added to the existing Marr College estate, such as a new sports hall, a new teaching wing and improved landscaping around the school estate. In July 2017, prior to renovation, the school roll was 921 pupils. After, with the new wing, capacity rose to 1350.

=== Refurbishment and extension ===
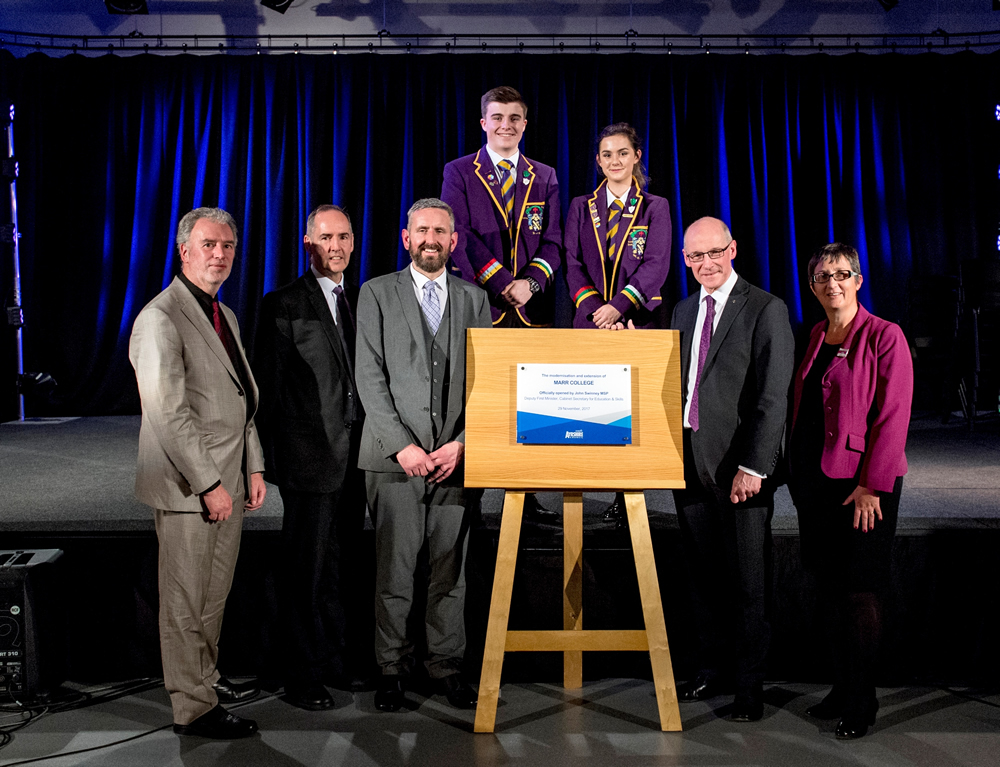
The official opening of the new extension and modernisation of Marr College, November 2017

The condition of the Marr College building has been well known and a matter of concern to South Ayrshire Council. In 2001, Marr College was included on a list of schools within South Ayrshire for consideration to be included on the Public Private Partnership bid to South Ayrshire Council – a bid which would have seen an entirely new state-of-the-art school estate constructed. Due to community issues, such as disagreements on which proposal would represent the best value to the community, the bid could not proceed. In 2008, Turner Townsend commissioned a report entitled Fit for Purpose, which highlighted a serious number of concerns regarding the condition of the current buildings that make up the Marr College campus. Many members of the Troon community believed that the issues relating to the condition of the Marr College estate were due to negligence and neglect on South Ayrshire Council's part. In response, a council representative issued a statement that South Ayrshire Council, as far as their budget has allowed, has maintained the original Marr College building, which has seen several improvements, including upgraded roofing and new and more energy-efficient window replacements.

Whilst a new Marr College campus has yet to be constructed, there have long been concerns from members of the Troon community and parents with children attending the school that the current school building is overcrowded. South Ayrshire Council acknowledge and agrees on this point but highlights that when South Ayrshire (then Strathclyde Regional Council) took over Marr College in 1975, the increase in pupil roll was addressed by implementing hut classrooms and extending parts of the school to meet the needs of the local community.

On 29 November 2017, the £37 million new extension of Marr College was officially opened by John Swinney, Deputy First Minister of Scotland and Cabinet Secretary for Education and Skills. The work was completed as part of a £94 million pipeline of works delivered across South Ayrshire school estates.

=== Controversies ===
Marr College has had a number of criticisms over the years: in 2016, a greenkeeper was fired for driving at high speeds towards a group of students, in 2022, hoax fire alarms were set seven times within the first 12 days of the school year, and in 2023, the school had problems with unchecked bullying. In 2018, parents of children attending Marr College raised concerns over the function of the school's English language department, following issues with staffing within the department at the school. Head Teacher George Docherty wrote to parents, advising them that the department had seen three staff leave to take up new posts in other schools. He further advised parents that "we are continuing to actively recruit for two further permanent posts" and confirmed that "priority is being given to providing English teachers to older pupils and that temporary arrangements have been put in place, led by the department head". One of the parents who raised concerns about the staffing problems at the school referred to the situation as "a joke", arguing that "we are at the stage where children are being taught by a temporary geography teacher", further commenting that English language subjects are "fundamental", and parents of children attending Marr College are concerned that "something is fundamentally wrong within the Marr English department".

== Sports school ==
In addition to traditional curriculum subject, Marr College offers pupils opportunities to study and train through the School of Rugby, School of Hockey and School of Handball. These schools form part of the school curriculum at Marr College during years S1-S3. Children attending Marr College in years S1-S3 attend timetabled coaching sessions as well as after school training and planned matches.

Marr Rugby Football Club (Marr RFC) was established during the 1930s as Marr College FP. It was originally for former pupils of Marr College, and, whilst this is no longer the case, Marr College and Marr RF continue to be closely associated and have a close affiliation. Three rugby development officers from Marr RFC work with the school frequently in order to promote rugby amongst both boys and girls attending the school.

== Marr Colours ==
=== Success and achievement ===
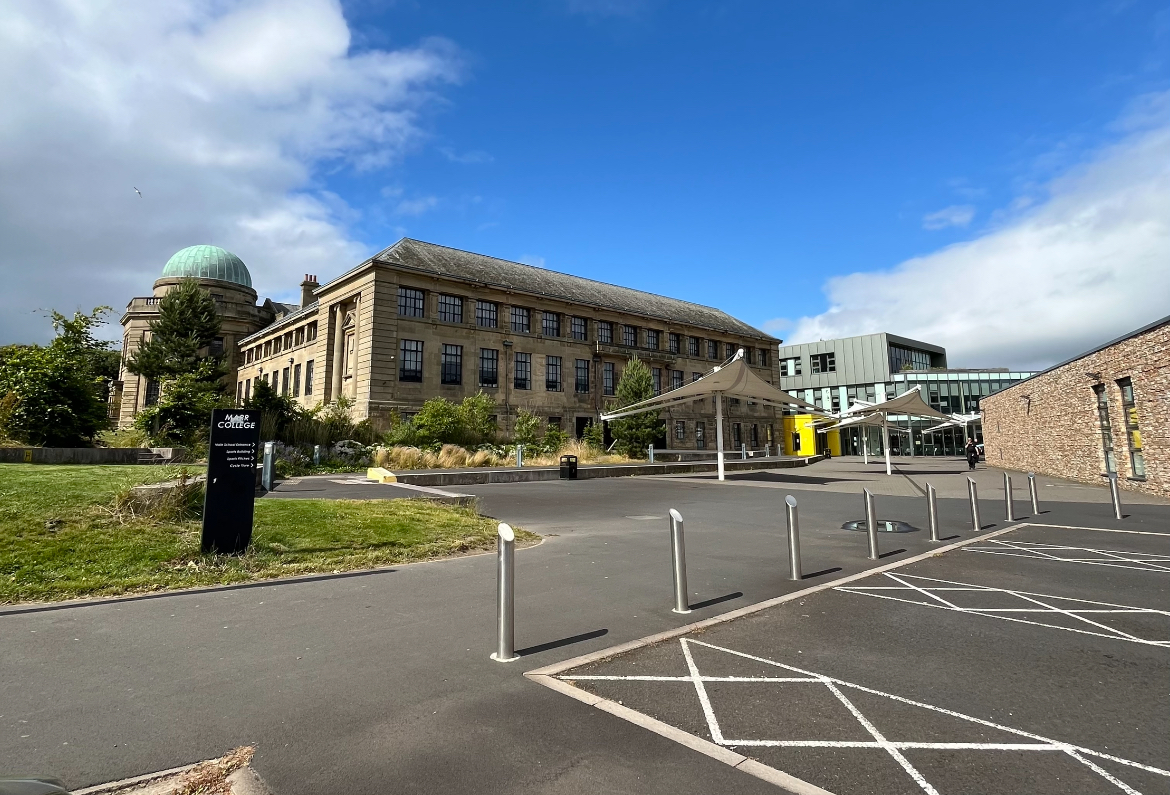
Marr College in July 2024, showing the recent modern extension to the school (right)

At Marr College, pupils are awarded colours to celebrate success and achievement during their time at the school. The school recognises the awarding of colours are a significant honour for pupils, and expect pupils to demonstrate long-term commitment in order to be considered for an award. Full Colours are the highest form of award given by the school, and therefore, has the most challenging criteria for pupils to meet in order to be awarded.

Four colours are available to pupils during S1-S6 and are as follows:

- Red Colours (for Academic Success)
- Blue Colours (for Music Success)
- Green Colours (for Sports Success)
- Light blue Colours (for Wider Achievement).

Four levels of school colours are awarded to pupils depending on their year group. Badges are awarded for pupils in S2 and S3, with S1 pupils able to apply from June of their S1 year, following their first full year at Marr College and when they are ready to progress into S2. Badges awarded to pupils for success and achievement in S2 and S3 have the school crest featuring details of what merited the colour being awarded for.

Ties are awarded to pupils in S4 who demonstrate success and achievement, and the tie is a variation on the original Marr College school tie which all pupils wear, however, it features thicker purple and gold stripes as well as the addition of a red stripe for academic success, green stripe for sport or a blue stripe for all other achievements. Half colours are awarded for pupils in S5 with the addition of gold braiding on the sleeves and top pocket of the school blazer with details of the award embroidered on the breast pocket of the blazer.

Full colours are awarded for pupils in S6. S6 pupils can apply for colours to recognise their success and achievements for the final time in the December of their S6 year before they leave the school. The addition of gold braiding around the whole school blazer features details of the award being awarded to pupils, embroidered on the breast pocket of the school blazer. A Colour band is also added to the blazer.

=== House Colours ===
In Marr College, all pupils from S1-S6 are placed within a school house. There are five houses – Fullarton, Lothian, Darley, Portland and Welbeck – and each is headed by a school captain who are pupils in S6.

Marr College House System
House Colour	House Name
	Darley
	Lothian
	Fullarton
	Welbeck
	Portland

== Head Teacher ==
The management team at Marr College consists of one head teacher, five deputy head teachers and several principal teachers of individual subjects and principal teachers of guidance. The management team is headed by the Head Teacher Ms Gillian McCallum, who had previously been employed as a teacher of Mathematics and as part of the school's senior management team.

Neil McLean, teacher of Computer Science, and Graham Hobson, teacher of Modern Languages, serve as depute head teachers at present.

Prior to Ms McCallum, the head teacher was Design and Technology teacher Mr George Docherty, who left the post to take up a senior position within South Ayrshire Council's education department.

== Notable former pupils ==
- Ronni Ancona, actress
- Tom Brighton, footballer
- Gordon Brown, rugby player
- Gordon Burns, footballer
- Innes Cameron, footballer
- Andrew Cotter, sports presenter
- Alan Hutton, footballer
- Donald Jack, writer
- Marysia Kay, actress
- Michael McKean, author of Vodka and Spirits: A Short Scottish Ghost Story.
- Rory McKenzie, footballer
- Tom Morton, writer and broadcaster
- Neil Murray, footballer
- Jamie Ness, footballer
- Steve Nicol, footballer
- Michael Russell, politician
- Tom Walsh, footballer
- Brian Whittle, athlete
- Susannah York, actress

== See also ==
- Marr College RFC
