= Albert Park, Hawick =

Football ground in Hawick, Scotland

Albert Park
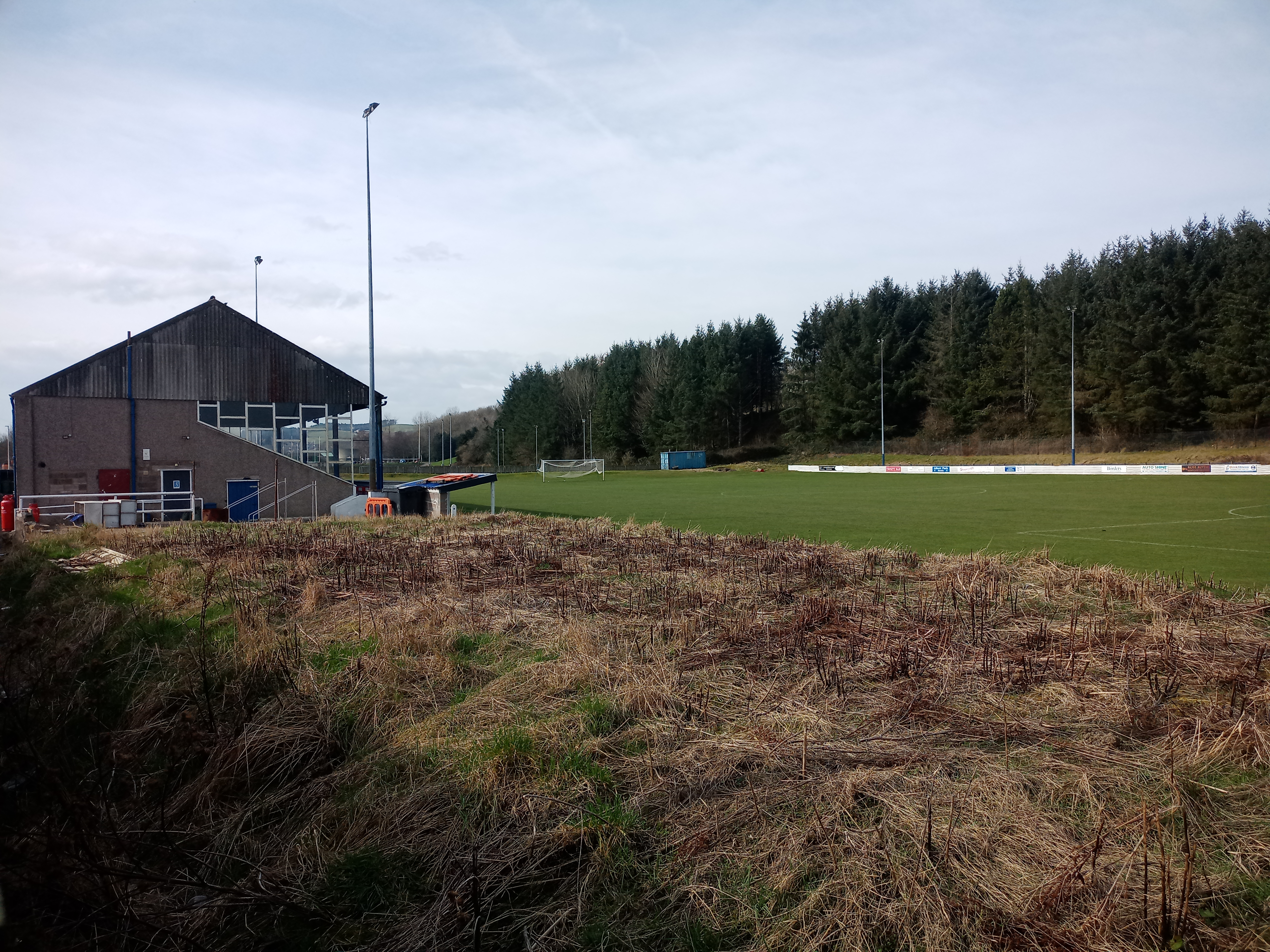
- Albert Park in 2022

- Location in Scottish Borders
- Location: Mansfield Road, Hawick, Roxburghshire, Scotland
- Coordinates: 55°25′59″N 2°45′46″W
- Capacity: 1,500
- Field size: 110 x 60 m

Construction
- Opened: 1963

Tenant
- Hawick Royal Albert F.C. (1963–present)

Albert Park is a football ground in Hawick in the Scottish Borders, which is the home of East of Scotland Football League club Hawick Royal Albert F.C.

== Football ==
The ground was opened in 1963 and is located on Mansfield Road in the north-east of the town. It is adjacent to the Mansfield Park rugby union ground, home of Hawick RFC.

== Greyhound racing ==
Albert Park had a short lived greyhound track around the pitch from 13 May 1989 until 1999. The track was a fairly tight circuit, heavily banked and raced over 270, 450 and 630 yards. The greyhound operation closed amidst controversy after a track manager was convicted of animal cruelty after using hares as live bait. Greyhound racing's governing body the Greyhound Board of Great Britain (GBGB) were unable to impose any punishment because the track chose to be independent and was not affiliated to the GBGB.
