= Hawick Royal Albert F.C. =

Association football club in Scotland

Hawick Royal Albert
- Full name: Hawick Royal Albert Football Club
- Nicknames: The Royalists, The Albert
- Founded: 1946
- Ground: Albert Park, Hawick
- Capacity: 1,500 (500 seated)
- Coordinates: 55°25′59″N 2°45′46″W
- Chairman: Brian Fowler
- Manager: Kenny Aitchison
- League: East of Scotland League Second Division
- 2025–26: East of Scotland League Third Division, 1st of 11 (promoted)
- Website: https://www.hawickroyalalbertunited.co.uk/

Hawick Royal Albert Football Club is a Scottish football club based in the town of Hawick in the Scottish Borders. The club was founded in 1946 as Hawick Royal Albert and in 2019 merged with amateur side Hawick United to create Hawick Royal Albert United. The club plays its home matches at Albert Park and currently competes in the East of Scotland League Second Division. For the 2022/23 season, they dropped the name "United" from their title and reverted back to the original club badge.

Before the East of Scotland League was split into two divisions, Hawick Royal Albert won it three times and finished runners-up once. The club reached the final of the Scottish Qualifying Cup South on three occasions, winning it twice, before it was abolished in 2007. Hawick Royal Albert now qualifies automatically for the Scottish Cup as a member of the Scottish Football Association (SFA), its best result reaching the second round on five occasions.

== History ==
Hawick Royal Albert was formed in 1946 after breaking away from Hawick Railway F.C., who were founded a year earlier. The club name is derived from another Scottish football club, Royal Albert, who are based in Larkhall, where William Bunton, the co-founder of the Hawick club was from. The other co-founder was Harry Weir. Royal Albert was a ship, which the original club is named after. Hawick Royal Albert first competed in the Border Amateur League, which it won in the 1947–48 season.

The club joined the East of Scotland Football League, a senior non-league competition for the 1953–54 season. In its first year, the club was ranked 11th from fifteen, before the season was declared null and void due to a backlog of outstanding fixtures. Two seasons later, the club finished runner-up behind Eyemouth United. In 1966, the club applied to join Scotland's main national league competition – the Scottish Football League – when it was seeking to increase its membership by one. Hawick Royal Albert applied for election along with Gala Fairydean, but both lost out to Clydebank. Remaining in the East of Scotland League, they won the competition for the first time in the 1966–67 season, and defended the title the following year. As a result of winning the league, the club qualified for the Scottish Cup for the first time as a member of the Scottish Football Association. Its inaugural match in the tournament was in the first preliminary round against rivals Gala Fairydean and ended in a 4–1 victory, before losing to Elgin City in January 1967 in a replay by two goals to nil. This replay match was played at Borough Briggs, the home of Elgin City FC, and it was the first competitive match played under the newly installed Borough Briggs floodlights. The following season they won 8–2 on aggregate against Tarff Rovers in the Scottish Qualifying Cup South final to qualify for the Scottish Cup again. The club went on to win two preliminary round matches to reach the first round proper, losing 3–0 away to St Johnstone in January 1968. The club finished third in the East of Scotland League in 1969–70 and 1972–73, before winning it for the last time in the 1973–74 season.

Hawick Royal Albert applied to join the Scottish Football League for a second time in 1975, when the league was restructured, along with seven other non-league clubs, but was eliminated in the first round of voting. Ferranti Thistle, which later became Livingston, was the club elected. In 1980 and 1981, the club reached the Scottish Qualifying Cup South final in successive years, losing to Whitehill Welfare and beating Gala Fairydean respectively, to qualify for the Scottish Cup. In the 1987–88 season, the East of Scotland League was split into two divisions of ten clubs; the Premier Division and First Division. Hawick Royal Albert competed in the first season of the Premier Division, but finished 9th and were relegated to the First Division.

From the 2007–08 season, the Scottish Qualifying Cup was abolished which was the only way for non-league clubs, such as Hawick Royal Albert to qualify for the Scottish Cup. A new format was introduced, which allowed all clubs with Scottish Football Association membership in the three senior non-league competitions to qualify automatically for the first round of the tournament. Through the new rules, the club competed in the Scottish Cup in 2007–08 for the first time in ten years. In the 2009–10 competition, Hawick Royal Albert was accused of being part of a match fixing scandal following betting irregularities in a first round match against Huntly, when it lost 7–0. The club denied any wrongdoing and no action was taken by the police or SFA.

== Grounds ==
Hawick Royal Albert first played its home matches at Wilton Lodge Park near the village of Wilton Dean in Hawick.

In 1963, the club moved to Albert Park in the town. The ground is located on Mansfield Road on the northern bank of the River Teviot and is adjacent to Mansfield Park, a rugby union ground. Shortly after moving to the ground, it was inspected and passed criteria to allow the club to become a member of the Scottish Football Association. The opening game at the ground was a friendly between Hawick Royal Albert and Hibernian. The spectator stand at Albert Park was constructed from the steel remnants of the Wilson and Glenny woollen factory, which was destroyed by a fire in 1959. Floodlights were installed at the ground in 1981, and were first used in a friendly against Celtic. Included in Celtic's squad was future Scotland internationalist, Charlie Nicholas and future Manchester United manager, David Moyes.

== Honours ==
League

- East of Scotland Football League
  - Winners (3): 1966–67, 1967–68, 1973–74
  - Runners-up (1): 1955–56

Cup

- Scottish Qualifying Cup South
  - Winners (2): 1967, 1981
  - Runners-up (1): 1980
- East of Scotland Qualifying Cup
  - Winners (4): 1964–65, 1967–68, 1974–75, 1977–78
- King Cup
  - Winners (3): 1966–67, 1981–82, 1983–84
