= Mark Shanks =

Scottish footballer and manager

Mark Shanks (born 19 May 1959) is a Scottish former association football player and manager. Shanks played for Motherwell, Ayr United, Dumbarton and Dumfries club Queen of the South.
