= 2015–16 South of Scotland Football League =

South of Scotland Football League
- Season: 2015–16
- Champions: St Cuthbert Wanderers
- Matches: 182
- Goals: 880 (4.84 per match)

The 2015–16 South of Scotland Football League, was the 70th season of the South of Scotland Football League, and the 2nd season as the sixth tier of the Scottish football pyramid system. Wigtown & Bladnoch were the defending champions.

Crichton merged with North & South Lanarkshire AFA side Lochmaben to prevent the club folding, which included a return to Crichton Hospital Park.

St Cuthbert Wanderers won their thirteenth league title, but remained in the division as they did not meet the required licensing criteria for promotion to the Lowland League.

== Teams ==
Location of teams in 2015–16 South of Scotland Football League within Dumfries & Galloway

Team	Location	Home ground	Capacity	Ref.
Abbey Vale	New Abbey	Maryfield Park	1,000	
Creetown	Creetown	Castle Cary Park	2,000	
Crichton	Dumfries	Crichton Hospital Park	500	
Dumfries YMCA	Dumfries	Kingholm Park	1,000	
Edusport Academy	Annan	Galabank	3,000	
Fleet Star	Gatehouse of Fleet	Garries Park	1,000	
Heston Rovers	Dumfries	Palmerston Park	7,620	
Lochar Thistle	Dumfries	Maxwelltown High School	1,000	
Mid-Annandale	Lockerbie	New King Edward Park	1,000	
Newton Stewart	Newton Stewart	Blairmount Park	1,500	
Nithsdale Wanderers	Sanquhar	Lorimer Park	1,000	
St Cuthbert Wanderers	Kirkcudbright	St Mary's Park	2,000	
Upper Annandale	Moffat	Moffat Academy	1,000	
Wigtown & Bladnoch	Wigtown	Trammondford Park	1,500	

== League table ==
Pos	Team	Pld	W	D	L	GF	GA	GD	Pts	Promotion or qualification
1	St Cuthbert Wanderers (C)	26	24	1	1	120	34	+86	73	Ineligible for promotion to Lowland League
2	Edusport Academy	26	20	3	3	96	22	+74	63	
3	Wigtown & Bladnoch	26	15	4	7	67	49	+18	49	
4	Crichton	26	14	5	7	76	54	+22	47	
5	Heston Rovers	26	13	5	8	68	52	+16	44	
6	Upper Annandale	26	13	1	12	54	57	−3	40	
7	Lochar Thistle	26	12	2	12	68	56	+12	38	
8	Mid-Annandale	26	10	4	12	57	51	+6	34	
9	Newton Stewart	26	10	3	13	54	62	−8	33	
10	Creetown	26	9	2	15	54	68	−14	29	
11	Abbey Vale	26	8	2	16	48	76	−28	26	
12	Nithsdale Wanderers	26	7	5	14	43	74	−31	26	
13	Fleet Star	26	5	3	18	43	87	−44	18	
14	Dumfries YMCA	26	2	0	24	32	138	−106	6	

Source: South of Scotland Football League
Rules for classification: 1) points; 2) goal difference; 3) number of goals scored.
(C) Champions
