= 2014–15 South of Scotland Football League =

South of Scotland Football League
- Season: 2014–15
- Champions: Wigtown & Bladnoch
- Matches: 182
- Goals: 883 (4.85 per match)
- Biggest home win: Wigtown & Bladnoch 18–0 Dumfries YMCA (22 April 2015)
- Biggest away win: Dumfries YMCA 2–14 Lochar Thistle (22 April 2015)
- Highest scoring: Wigtown & Bladnoch 18–0 Dumfries YMCA (22 April 2015)
- Longest winning run: 9 games Newton Stewart
- Longest unbeaten run: 16 games Wigtown & Bladnoch
- Longest winless run: 26 games Dumfries YMCA
- Longest losing run: 21 games Dumfries YMCA
- Highest attendance: 237; Wigtown & Bladnoch 3–2 Newton Stewart (4 April 2015)

The 2014–15 South of Scotland Football League, was the 69th season of the South of Scotland Football League, and the 1st season as the sixth tier of the Scottish football pyramid system. Wigtown & Bladnoch were the defending champions.

This season saw the introduction of three new member clubs, including two from the recently defunct Dumfries & District Amateur Football League, Upper Annandale and Dumfries YMCA. Edusport Academy were the additional new entrant.

The championship was successfully retained by Wigtown & Bladnoch, who overhauled long-time leaders Newton Stewart to win their first back-to-back league titles in the history of the club. Confirmation of Wigtown's success came as Newton Stewart were deducted six points for failing to fulfil a fixture at Abbey Vale and Wigtown beat Nithsdale Wanderers 2–0 therefore making it mathematically impossible for Newton Stewart to win the title.

This was the first season in which the league was added to the Scottish league pyramid system at level six, with the winner due to face the East of Scotland League champions for a place in the Lowland League. However, as Wigtown & Bladnoch did not meet the required licensing criteria for promotion, no play-off took place and they remained in the division for the following season.

== Teams ==
Location of teams in 2014–15 South of Scotland Football League within Dumfries & Galloway

The following teams changed prior to the 2014–15 season.

=== To South of Scotland League ===
- Dumfries YMCA
- Edusport Academy
- Upper Annandale

Team	Location	Home ground	Capacity	Ref.
Abbey Vale	New Abbey	Maryfield Park	1,000	
Creetown	Creetown	Castle Cary Park	2,000	
Crichton	Dumfries	Dumfries High School	500	
Dumfries YMCA	Dumfries	Kingholm Park	1,000	
Edusport Academy	Hamilton	Hamilton Palace Sports Grounds	1,000	
Fleet Star	Gatehouse of Fleet	Garries Park	1,000	
Heston Rovers	Dumfries	Palmerston Park	7,620	
Lochar Thistle	Dumfries	Maxwelltown High School	1,000	
Mid-Annandale	Lockerbie	New King Edward Park	1,000	
Newton Stewart	Newton Stewart	Blairmount Park	1,500	
Nithsdale Wanderers	Sanquhar	Lorimer Park	1,000	
St Cuthbert Wanderers	Kirkcudbright	St Mary's Park	2,000	
Upper Annandale	Moffat	Moffat Academy	1,000	
Wigtown & Bladnoch	Wigtown	Trammondford Park	1,500	

== League table ==
Pos	Team	Pld	W	D	L	GF	GA	GD	Pts	Promotion or qualification
1	Wigtown & Bladnoch (C)	26	21	3	2	109	19	+90	66	Ineligible for promotion to Lowland League
2	Newton Stewart (Note: Newton Stewart deducted six points.)	26	19	3	4	100	32	+68	54	
3	St Cuthbert Wanderers	26	17	3	6	90	50	+40	54	
4	Lochar Thistle	26	17	1	8	81	54	+27	52	
5	Edusport Academy	26	15	2	9	79	37	+42	47	
6	Heston Rovers	26	13	4	9	61	45	+16	43	
7	Abbey Vale	26	12	2	12	50	52	−2	38	
8	Fleet Star	26	12	1	13	59	53	+6	37	
9	Crichton	26	10	2	14	59	80	−21	32	
10	Mid-Annandale	26	8	3	15	50	55	−5	27	
11	Upper Annandale	26	7	4	15	40	64	−24	25	
12	Creetown	26	8	1	17	49	78	−29	25	
13	Nithsdale Wanderers	26	6	4	16	30	69	−39	22	
14	Dumfries YMCA	26	0	1	25	32	201	−169	1	

Source: South of Scotland Football League
Rules for classification: 1) points; 2) goal difference; 3) number of goals scored.
(C) Champions
