= 2019–20 South Challenge Cup =

SFA South Region Challenge Cup

Tournament details
- Country: Scotland; England (2 teams)
- Dates: 24 August 2019 – 15 August 2021
- Teams: 70

Final positions
- Champions: Dunipace (1st title)
- Runners-up: Broomhill

Tournament statistics
- Matches played: 68
- Goals scored: 250 (3.68 per match)
- Attendance: 8,397 (123 per match)
- All statistics correct as of 15 August 2021.

The 2019–20 SFA South Region Challenge Cup was the 13th edition of the annual cup competition for senior non-league clubs in the central and southern regions of Scotland. This season saw the competition increase to 70 teams despite the demise of Selkirk and withdrawal of Eyemouth United, thanks to the relegation of Berwick Rangers to the Lowland League plus the addition of Glenrothes and Kinnoull to the East of Scotland Football League.

The defending champions were East Kilbride, who beat Bonnyrigg Rose Athletic 2–1 in the final on 26 May 2019. The competition was won by Dunipace for the first time, beating Broomhill 3–1 in the final, which had been delayed due to the COVID-19 pandemic and took place almost two years after the first round matches.

== Format ==
The competition featured 70 teams from the Lowland Football League (16), East of Scotland Football League (39), South of Scotland Football League (14), as well as SFA member club Glasgow University of the Caledonian Amateur Football League. The reserve teams of Stirling University, Caledonian Braves, and Stranraer do not take part.

The draw was unseeded, with matches proceeding to extra time and penalties if they were tied after 90 minutes.

== Calendar ==
Round	Main date	Fixtures	Clubs
First Round	24 August 2019	6	70 → 64
Second Round	14 September 2019	32	64 → 32
Third Round	12 October 2019	16	32 → 16
Fourth Round	9 November 2019	8	16 → 8
Quarter-Finals	7 March 2020	4	8 → 4
Semi-Finals	27 December 2020; 31 July 2021	2	4 → 2
Final	15 August 2021	1	2 → 1

== First round ==
The first round took place on Saturday 24 August 2019. The draw for the first and second rounds took place at the South of Scotland Football League's AGM on Thursday 30 May 2019. 58 clubs received a bye to the second round, with 12 taking part in the first round.

24 August 2019	Berwick Rangers	4–0	Newtongrange Star	Berwick-upon-Tweed
15:00				Stadium: Shielfield Park; Attendance: 291

24 August 2019	Broxburn Athletic	4–0	Tynecastle	Broxburn
15:00				Stadium: Albyn Park; Attendance: 109

24 August 2019	Coldstream	1–3	Dunipace	Coldstream
14:30				Stadium: Home Park; Attendance: 83

24 August 2019	Lothian Thistle Hutchison Vale	4–0	Dalkeith Thistle	Edinburgh
14:30				Stadium: Saughton Enclosure; Attendance: 49

24 August 2019	Oakley United	4–4 (a.e.t.) (3–4 p)	Easthouses Lily MW	Oakley
14:30				Stadium: Blairwood Park

24 August 2019	Ormiston	6–1	Dumfries YMCA	Ormiston
14:30				Stadium: Recreation Park; Attendance: 40

== Second round ==
The second round took place on the weekend of Saturday 14 September 2019. The six winners from the first round joined the 58 clubs who received a bye.

Seven days after the draw Kinnoull joined the East of Scotland League following the withdrawal of Eyemouth, and were permitted to take-on their home tie against The Spartans.

13 September 2019	Cumbernauld Colts	1–0	Dalbeattie Star	Cumbernauld
19:45				Stadium: Broadwood Stadium; Attendance: 93

14 September 2019	Blackburn United	8–1	St. Cuthbert Wanderers	Blackburn
14:30				Stadium: New Murrayfield Park; Attendance: 59

14 September 2019	Bo'ness United	1–2 (a.e.t.)	BSC Glasgow	Camelon
14:30				Stadium: Carmuirs Park; Attendance: 275

14 September 2019	Bonnyton Thistle	5–2	Lothian Thistle Hutchison Vale	Kilmarnock
15:00				Stadium: Synergy Arena; Attendance: 20

14 September 2019	Broxburn Athletic	3–1	Edinburgh University	Broxburn
14:30				Stadium: Albyn Park; Attendance: 96

14 September 2019	Burntisland Shipyard	1–2	Threave Rovers	Burntisland
14:30				Stadium: Recreation Park; Attendance: 69

14 September 2019	Caledonian Braves	4–0	Crossgates Primrose	Motherwell
15:00				Stadium: Alliance Park; Attendance: 50

14 September 2019	Creetown	0–5	Craigroyston	Creetown
15:00				Stadium: Castlecary Park; Attendance: 57

14 September 2019	Dunbar United	1–0 (a.e.t.)	Abbey Vale	Dunbar
14:30				Stadium: New Countess Park; Attendance: 110

14 September 2019	Edinburgh United	1–2	Dunipace	Edinburgh
14:30				Stadium: Paties Road Stadium; Attendance: 37

14 September 2019	Gala Fairydean Rovers	2–1	Newton Stewart	Galashiels
13:00				Stadium: 3G Arena, Netherdale; Attendance: 73

14 September 2019	Glasgow University	0–5	Bonnyrigg Rose Athletic	Airdrie
15:00				Stadium: Excelsior Stadium; Attendance: 71

14 September 2019	Glenrothes	3–0	Lochmaben	Glenrothes
14:30				Stadium: Warout Stadium; Attendance: 105

14 September 2019	Haddington Athletic	0–5	Camelon Juniors	Haddington
14:30				Stadium: Millfield Park; Attendance: 94

14 September 2019	Hawick Royal Albert United	1–2	Easthouses Lily MW	Hawick
14:30				Stadium: Albert Park, Hawick; Attendance: 52

14 September 2019	Hill of Beath Hawthorn	2–1	Whitehill Welfare	Hill of Beath
14:30				Stadium: Keir's Park; Attendance: 133

14 September 2019	Kinnoull	0–3	The Spartans	Perth
14:30				Stadium: Tulloch Park; Attendance: 65

14 September 2019	Leith Athletic	1–5	East Kilbride	Edinburgh
15:00				Stadium: Peffermill 3G; Attendance: 68

14 September 2019	Linlithgow Rose	5–1	Gretna 2008	Linlithgow
14:30				Stadium: Prestonfield; Attendance: 283

14 September 2019	Lochar Thistle	0–5	East Stirlingshire	Dumfries
15:00				Stadium: Maxwelltown High School; Attendance: 78

14 September 2019	Musselburgh Athletic	5–0	Mid-Annandale	Musselburgh
14:30				Stadium: Olivebank Stadium; Attendance: 183

14 September 2019	Peebles Rovers	2–3	Nithsdale Wanderers	Peebles
14:30				Stadium: Whitestone Park; Attendance: 66

14 September 2019	Penicuik Athletic	5–2	Dundonald Bluebell	Penicuik
14:30				Stadium: Penicuik Park; Attendance: 177

14 September 2019	Preston Athletic	3–2	Inverkeithing Hillfield Swifts	Prestonpans
14:30				Stadium: Pennypit Park; Attendance: 43

14 September 2019	Sauchie Juniors	1–2	Civil Service Strollers	Sauchie
14:30				Stadium: Beechwood Park; Attendance: 126

14 September 2019	St Andrews United	2–3	Jeanfield Swifts	St Andrews
14:30				Stadium: Barnetts Park; Attendance: 90

14 September 2019	Tranent Juniors	2–1	Berwick Rangers	Tranent
14:30				Stadium: Foresters Park; Attendance: 303

14 September 2019	Tweedmouth Rangers	1–2	Upper Annandale	Berwick-upon-Tweed
14:30				Stadium: Old Shielfield; Attendance: 45

14 September 2019	Vale of Leithen	1–6	Kelty Hearts	Innerleithen
15:00				Stadium: Victoria Park; Attendance: 105

14 September 2019	Wigtown & Bladnoch	0–2	Heriot-Watt University	Wigtown
15:00				Stadium: Trammondford Park; Attendance: 26

15 September 2019	Heston Rovers	4–0	Ormiston	Dumfries
15:00				Stadium: Palmerston Park; Attendance: 62

15 September 2019	Stirling University	w/o (Awarded)	Arniston Rangers	Stirling
15:00				Stadium: Forthbank Stadium

1. A-Arniston Rangers were unable to field a team and withdrew from the competition.

== Third round ==
The third round took place on Saturday 12 October 2019.

=== Draw ===
The draw for the third round took place on Sunday 15 September 2019 after the final second round match at Palmerston Park.

Lowland League	East of Scotland Premier Division	East of Scotland First Division	South of Scotland League
Bonnyrigg Rose Athletic; BSC Glasgow; Caledonian Braves; Civil Service Strollers; Cumbernauld Colts; East Kilbride; East Stirlingshire; Gala Fairydean Rovers; Kelty Hearts; The Spartans; Stirling University	Blackburn United; Broxburn Athletic; Camelon Juniors; Dunbar United; Hill of Beath Hawthorn; Jeanfield Swifts; Linlithgow Rose; Musselburgh Athletic; Penicuik Athletic; Tranent Juniors	Craigroyston; Dunipace; Easthouses Lily MW; Glenrothes; Heriot-Watt University; Preston Athletic	Bonnyton Thistle; Heston Rovers; Nithsdale Wanderers; Threave Rovers; Upper Annandale

=== Matches ===
12 October 2019	Blackburn United	1–2	East Stirlingshire	Blackburn
14:30				Stadium: New Murrayfield Park; Attendance: 170

12 October 2019	Bonnyrigg Rose Athletic	3–0	Threave Rovers	Bonnyrigg
15:00				Stadium: New Dundas Park; Attendance: 436

12 October 2019	BSC Glasgow	3–1	Gala Fairydean Rovers	Alloa
15:00				Stadium: Recreation Park; Attendance: 82

12 October 2019	Caledonian Braves	5–3	Musselburgh Athletic	Motherwell
15:00				Stadium: Alliance Park; Attendance: 104

12 October 2019	Camelon Juniors	4–1	Heriot-Watt University	Camelon
14:30				Stadium: Carmuirs Park; Attendance: 130

12 October 2019	Civil Service Strollers	1–2 (a.e.t.)	Kelty Hearts	Edinburgh
15:00				Stadium: Christie Gillies Park; Attendance: 237

12 October 2019	Craigroyston	0–6	Preston Athletic	Edinburgh
14:30				Stadium: St Mark's Park; Attendance: 55

12 October 2019	Cumbernauld Colts	1–0	Jeanfield Swifts	Cumbernauld
15:00				Stadium: Broadwood Stadium; Attendance: 88

12 October 2019	Dunbar United	1–2	Broxburn Athletic	Dunbar
14:30				Stadium: New Countess Park; Attendance: 196

12 October 2019	Dunipace	3–1	Glenrothes	Denny
14:300				Stadium: Westfield Park; Attendance: 100

12 October 2019	Easthouses Lily MW	0–4	East Kilbride	Easthouses
14:30				Stadium: Newbattle Complex; Attendance: 84

12 October 2019	Heston Rovers	0–6	Linlithgow Rose	Dumfries
15:00				Stadium: Palmerston Park; Attendance: 166

12 October 2019	Nithsdale Wanderers	1–4	Bonnyton Thistle	Sanquhar
15:00				Stadium: Lorimer Park; Attendance: 75

12 October 2019	The Spartans	2–3	Stirling University	Edinburgh
15:00				Stadium: Ainslie Park; Attendance: 181

12 October 2019	Penicuik Athletic	2–3	Hill of Beath Hawthorn	Penicuik
14:30				Stadium: Penicuik Park; Attendance: 230

12 October 2019	Upper Annandale	0–3	Tranent Juniors	Moffat
15:00				Stadium: Moffat Academy; Attendance: 83

== Fourth round ==
The fourth round took place on Saturday 9 November 2019.

=== Draw ===
Lowland League	East of Scotland Premier Division	East of Scotland First Division	South of Scotland League
Bonnyrigg Rose Athletic; BSC Glasgow; Caledonian Braves; Cumbernauld Colts; East Kilbride; East Stirlingshire; Kelty Hearts; Stirling University	Broxburn Athletic; Camelon Juniors; Hill of Beath Hawthorn; Linlithgow Rose; Tranent Juniors	Dunipace; Preston Athletic	Bonnyton Thistle

=== Matches ===
8 November 2019	BSC Glasgow	6–1	Preston Athletic	Alloa
20:00				Stadium: Recreation Park; Attendance: 75

9 November 2019	Broxburn Athletic	2–4	Tranent Juniors	Broxburn
14:30				Stadium: Albyn Park; Attendance: 204

9 November 2019	Caledonian Braves	3–0	Bonnyton Thistle	Motherwell
15:00				Stadium: Alliance Park

9 November 2019	Camelon Juniors	2–1	Linlithgow Rose	Camelon
13:30				Stadium: Carmuirs Park; Attendance: 372

9 November 2019	Dunipace	1–0	Bonnyrigg Rose Athletic	Denny
14:30				Stadium: Westfield Park; Attendance: 209

9 November 2019	East Kilbride	1–0	East Stirlingshire	East Kilbride
15:00				Stadium: K Park; Attendance: 150

9 November 2019	Hill of Beath Hawthorn	1–1 (a.e.t.) (4–2 p)	Cumbernauld Colts	Hill of Beath
14:30				Stadium: Keir's Park; Attendance: 110

9 November 2019	Kelty Hearts	2–0	Stirling University	Kelty
15:00				Stadium: New Central Park; Attendance: 303

== Quarter-finals ==
The quarter-finals took place on Saturday 7 March 2020.

=== Draw ===
The draw took place at a meeting of the East of Scotland League's board on 27 November 2019.

Lowland League	East of Scotland Premier Division	East of Scotland First Division
BSC Glasgow; Caledonian Braves; East Kilbride; Kelty Hearts	Camelon Juniors; Hill of Beath Hawthorn; Tranent Juniors	Dunipace

=== Matches ===
6 March 2020	BSC Glasgow	1–1 (a.e.t.) (6–5 p)	Kelty Hearts	Alloa
19:45				Stadium: Recreation Park; Attendance: 212

7 March 2020	Caledonian Braves	0–1	Dunipace	Motherwell
15:00				Stadium: Alliance Park

7 March 2020	East Kilbride	5–0	Camelon Juniors	East Kilbride
15:00				Stadium: K Park

7 March 2020	Hill of Beath Hawthorn	5–1	Tranent Juniors	Hill of Beath
14:30				Stadium: Keir's Park; Attendance: 172

== Semi-finals ==
The semi-finals were scheduled to take place on Saturday 4 April 2020, but the matches were postponed due to the COVID-19 pandemic. The semi-final draw was made on 5 August 2020 with no date being scheduled for the matches, until they were rescheduled in December 2020.

=== Draw ===
Lowland League	East of Scotland Premier Division	East of Scotland First Division
BSC Glasgow; East Kilbride	Hill of Beath Hawthorn	Dunipace

=== Matches ===
27 December 2020	BSC Glasgow	1–0	East Kilbride	Alloa
15:00	Christie 66'			Stadium: Recreation Park; Attendance: 0 Referee: Chris Hughes

31 July 2021	Hill of Beath Hawthorn	2–4	Dunipace	Hill of Beath
14:30	Reid 14' (pen.); Connelly 57'		Denham 8'; A. Grant 54'; Langton 59'; D. Grant 87'	Stadium: Keir's Park; Attendance: 120

== Final ==
The final was scheduled to take place on Sunday 24 May 2020, however the match was postponed due to the COVID-19 pandemic until the following year. It was postponed for a second time and later rescheduled to take place early in the 2021–22 season.

BSC Glasgow renamed to Broomhill in July 2021. Both teams played in their away strips.

=== Route to the final ===
Broomhill (BSC Glasgow at the time) received a bye in the first round before they began their campaign away to East of Scotland League Premier Division side Bo'ness United. Fellow Lowland League club Gala Fairydean Rovers were next up, then Preston Athletic of the EOSFL First Division. They won on penalties against eventual Lowland League champions Kelty Hearts shortly before the March 2020 lockdown. Their semi-final took place 7 months later where they knocked out reigning champions East Kilbride.

Dunipace's route to the final saw them defeat fellow East of Scotland League First Division sides Coldstream, Edinburgh United, and Glenrothes, before seeing off Lowland League clubs Bonnyrigg Rose and Caledonian Braves. Their semi-final took place after a delay of 14 months, away to Hill of Beath Hawthorn of the EOSFL Premier Division.

15 August 2021
14:00

Broomhill	1–3	Dunipace
Cusick 30'		Herron 6'; Morrison 24'; D. Grant 87'

Prestonfield, Linlithgow
Attendance: 450
Referee: Lorraine Watson

Broomhill	Dunipace
