= 2015–16 in Scottish football =

Football in Scotland
- Season: 2015–16

2015–16 in Scottish football

Premiership champions
- Celtic

Championship champions
- Rangers

League 1 champions
- Dunfermline Athletic

League 2 champions
- East Fife

Scottish Cup winners
- Hibernian

League Cup winners
- Ross County

Challenge Cup winners
- Rangers

Youth Cup winners
- Motherwell

Teams in Europe
- Celtic, Aberdeen, Inverness Caledonian Thistle, St Johnstone

Scotland national team
- UEFA Euro 2016 qualifying

The 2015–16 season was the 119th season of competitive football in Scotland. The domestic season began on 25 July 2015, with the first round of the 2015–16 Scottish Challenge Cup. The 2015–16 Scottish Professional Football League season commenced on 1 August.

== League competitions ==
=== Scottish Premiership ===
Pos	Team	Pld	W	D	L	GF	GA	GD	Pts	Qualification or relegation (Note: Teams play each other three times (33 matches), before the league is split into two groups (the top six and the bottom six).)
1	Celtic (C)	38	26	8	4	93	31	+62	86	Qualification for the Champions League second qualifying round
2	Aberdeen	38	22	5	11	62	48	+14	71	Qualification for the Europa League first qualifying round
3	Heart of Midlothian	38	18	11	9	59	40	+19	65	Qualification for the Europa League first qualifying round
4	St Johnstone	38	16	8	14	58	55	+3	56	
5	Motherwell	38	15	5	18	47	63	−16	50	
6	Ross County	38	14	6	18	55	61	−6	48	
7	Inverness Caledonian Thistle	38	14	10	14	54	48	+6	52	
8	Dundee	38	11	15	12	53	57	−4	48	
9	Partick Thistle	38	12	10	16	41	50	−9	46	
10	Hamilton Academical	38	11	10	17	42	63	−21	43	
11	Kilmarnock (O)	38	9	9	20	41	64	−23	36	Qualification for the Premiership play-off final
12	Dundee United (Note: Dundee United were deducted three points for fielding an ineligible player in their win over Inverness Caledonian Thistle on 6 May 2016.) (R)	38	8	7	23	45	70	−25	28	Relegation to the Championship

Source: SPFL Archive
Rules for classification: 1) Points; 2) Goal difference; 3) Goals scored; 4) Play-off (only if deciding champion, UEFA competitions qualification and second stage group allocation).
(C) Champions; (O) Play-off winners; (R) Relegated

=== Scottish Championship ===
Pos	Team	Pld	W	D	L	GF	GA	GD	Pts	Promotion, qualification or relegation
1	Rangers (C, P)	36	25	6	5	88	34	+54	81	Promotion to the Premiership
2	Falkirk	36	19	13	4	61	34	+27	70	Qualification for the Premiership play-off semi-finals
3	Hibernian	36	21	7	8	59	34	+25	70	Qualification for the Europa League second qualifying round and for the Premiership play-off quarter-finals (Note: Hibernian qualified for the Europa League second qualifying round by winning the 2015–16 Scottish Cup.)
4	Raith Rovers	36	18	8	10	52	46	+6	62	Qualification for the Premiership play-off quarter-finals
5	Greenock Morton	36	11	10	15	39	42	−3	43	
6	St Mirren	36	11	9	16	44	53	−9	42	
7	Queen of the South	36	12	6	18	46	56	−10	42	
8	Dumbarton	36	10	7	19	35	66	−31	37	
9	Livingston (R)	36	8	7	21	37	51	−14	31	Qualification for the Championship play-offs
10	Alloa Athletic (R)	36	4	9	23	22	67	−45	21	Relegation to League One

Source: Soccerway
Rules for classification: 1) Points; 2) Goal difference; 3) Number of goals scored
(C) Champions; (P) Promoted; (R) Relegated

=== Scottish League One ===
Pos	Team	Pld	W	D	L	GF	GA	GD	Pts	Promotion, qualification or relegation
1	Dunfermline Athletic (C, P)	36	24	7	5	83	30	+53	79	Promotion to Scottish Championship
2	Ayr United (O, P)	36	19	4	13	65	47	+18	61	Qualification to Championship play-offs
3	Peterhead	36	16	11	9	72	47	+25	59	Qualification to Championship play-offs
4	Stranraer	36	15	6	15	43	49	−6	51	Qualification to Championship play-offs
5	Airdrieonians	36	14	7	15	48	50	−2	49	
6	Albion Rovers	36	13	10	13	40	44	−4	49	
7	Brechin City	36	12	6	18	47	59	−12	42	
8	Stenhousemuir	36	11	7	18	46	80	−34	40	
9	Cowdenbeath (R)	36	11	6	19	46	72	−26	39	Qualification to League One play-offs
10	Forfar Athletic (R)	36	8	10	18	48	60	−12	34	Relegation to Scottish League Two

Source: BBC Sport
Rules for classification: 1) Points; 2) Goal difference; 3) Number of goals scored
(C) Champions; (O) Play-off winners; (P) Promoted; (R) Relegated

=== Scottish League Two ===
Pos	Team	Pld	W	D	L	GF	GA	GD	Pts	Promotion, qualification or relegation
1	East Fife (C, P)	36	18	8	10	62	41	+21	62	Promotion to Scottish League One
2	Elgin City	36	17	8	11	59	46	+13	59	Qualification to League One play-offs
3	Clyde	36	17	6	13	56	45	+11	57	Qualification to League One play-offs
4	Queen's Park (O, P)	36	15	11	10	46	32	+14	56	Qualification to League One play-offs
5	Annan Athletic	36	16	8	12	69	57	+12	56	
6	Berwick Rangers	36	14	7	15	45	50	−5	49	
7	Stirling Albion	36	13	9	14	47	46	+1	48	
8	Montrose	36	11	10	15	50	70	−20	43	
9	Arbroath	36	11	6	19	42	51	−9	39	
10	East Stirlingshire (R)	36	9	5	22	41	79	−38	32	Qualification for the League Two play-off final

Source: BBC Sport
Rules for classification: 1) Points; 2) Goal difference; 3) Number of goals scored
(C) Champions; (O) Play-off winners; (P) Promoted; (R) Relegated

=== Non-league football ===
==== Level 5 ====
Highland Football League
Pos	Team	Pld	Pts
1	Cove Rangers (C)	34	89
2	Formartine United	34	85
3	Brora Rangers	34	85
4	Turriff United	34	68
5	Wick Academy	34	60
6	Inverurie Loco Works	34	58
7	Buckie Thistle	34	58
8	Nairn County	34	57
9	Fraserburgh	34	53
10	Keith	34	52
11	Forres Mechanics	34	49
12	Lossiemouth	34	38
13	Deveronvale	34	32
14	Clachnacuddin	34	32
15	Huntly	34	26
16	Strathspey Thistle	34	20
17	Fort William	34	16
18	Rothes	34	4

Source: BBC Sport
(C) Champions

Lowland Football League
Pos	Team	Pld	Pts
1	Edinburgh City (C, O, P)	28	73
2	The Spartans	28	58
3	Stirling University	28	56
4	Cumbernauld Colts	28	51
5	East Kilbride	28	49
6	Edinburgh University	28	42
7	BSC Glasgow	28	41
8	Whitehill Welfare	28	40
9	Dalbeattie Star	28	36
10	Gretna 2008	28	36
11	Gala Fairydean Rovers	28	32
12	Selkirk	28	29
13	Vale of Leithen	28	26
14	Preston Athletic	28	22
15	Threave Rovers (R)	28	10

Source: Soccerway
(C) Champions;
(O) Play-off winners;
(P) Promoted;
(R) Relegated

==== Level 6 ====
East of Scotland Football League
Pos	Team	Pld	Pts
1	Leith Athletic (C)	28	72
2	Lothian Thistle Hutchison Vale	28	63
3	Civil Service Strollers	28	55
4	Tynecastle	28	52
5	Hawick Royal Albert	28	48
6	Peebles Rovers	28	43
7	Spartans Reserves	28	41
8	Ormiston	28	41
9	Stirling University Reserves	28	35
10	Heriot-Watt University	28	33
11	Coldstream	28	32
12	Craigroyston	28	32
13	Burntisland Shipyard	28	27
14	Duns	28	14
15	Eyemouth United	28	11
16	Kelso United	0	0

Source: East of Scotland Football League
(C) Champions

South of Scotland Football League
Pos	Team	Pld	Pts
1	St Cuthbert Wanderers (C)	26	73
2	Edusport Academy	26	63
3	Wigtown & Bladnoch	26	49
4	Crichton	26	47
5	Heston Rovers	26	44
6	Upper Annandale	26	40
7	Lochar Thistle	26	38
8	Mid-Annandale	26	34
9	Newton Stewart	26	33
10	Creetown	26	29
11	Abbey Vale	26	26
12	Nithsdale Wanderers	26	26
13	Fleet Star	26	18
14	Dumfries YMCA	26	6

Source: South of Scotland Football League
(C) Champions

== Honours ==
=== Cup honours ===
Competition	Winner	Score	Runner-up	Match report
2015–16 Scottish Cup	Hibernian	3–2	Rangers	BBC Sport
2015–16 League Cup	Ross County	2–1	Hibernian	BBC Sport
2015–16 Challenge Cup	Rangers	4–0	Peterhead	BBC Sport
2015–16 Youth Cup	Motherwell	5–2	Heart of Midlothian	BBC Sport
2015–16 Junior Cup	Beith Juniors	1–1; 4–3 pens.	Pollok	The Herald
2015–16 Amateur Cup	Colville Park	2 – 1	Leven United	Glasgow World

=== Non-league honours ===
==== Senior ====
Competition	Winner
Highland League	Cove Rangers
Lowland League	Edinburgh City
East of Scotland League	Leith Athletic
South of Scotland League	St Cuthbert Wanderers

==== Junior ====
West Region

Division	Winner
2015–16 Super League Premier Division	Auchinleck Talbot
Super League First Division	Cumnock Juniors
Ayrshire District League	Girvan
Central District League First Division	Renfrew
Central District League Second Division	Forth Wanderers

East Region

Division	Winner
2015–16 Superleague	Bonnyrigg Rose Athletic
Premier League	Jeanfield Swifts
North Division	Downfield
South Division	Tranent Juniors

North Region

Division	Winner
2015–16 Superleague	Banks O' Dee
First Division (West)	Buckie Rovers
First Division (East)	Colony Park

=== Individual honours ===
==== PFA Scotland awards ====
Award	Winner	Team
Players' Player of the Year	Leigh Griffiths	Celtic
Young Player of the Year	Kieran Tierney	Celtic
Manager of the Year	Mark Warburton	Rangers
Championship Player of Year	Lee Wallace	Rangers
League One Player of Year	Faissal El Bakhtaoui	Dunfermline Athletic
League Two Player of Year	Nathan Austin	East Fife

==== SFWA awards ====
Award	Winner	Team
Footballer of the Year	Leigh Griffiths	Celtic
Young Player of the Year	Kieran Tierney	Celtic
Manager of the Year	Jim McIntyre	Ross County
International Player of the Year	Matt Ritchie	Bournemouth

== Scottish clubs in Europe ==
Celtic, Inverness Caledonian Thistle, Aberdeen and St Johnstone qualified for European competition.

=== Celtic ===
UEFA Champions League

15 July 2015 Second qualifying	Celtic (Scotland)	2 – 0	(Iceland) Stjarnan	Glasgow, Scotland
	Boyata 44'; Johansen 56'	BBC Sport		Stadium: Celtic Park; Attendance: 48,185; Referee: Daniel Siebert (Germany)

22 July 2015 Second qualifying	Stjarnan (Iceland)	1 – 4 (1 – 6 agg.)	(Scotland) Celtic	Garðabær, Iceland
	Finsen 7'	BBC Sport	Bitton 33'; Mulgrew 49'; Griffiths 88'; Johansen 90'	Stadium: Samsungvöllur; Referee: Jonathan Lardot (Belgium)

29 July 2015 Third qualifying	Celtic (Scotland)	1 – 0	(Azerbaijan) Qarabağ	Glasgow, Scotland
	Boyata 82'	BBC Sport		Stadium: Celtic Park; Attendance: 43,011; Referee: Robert Schörgenhofer (Austria)

5 August 2015 Third qualifying	Qarabağ (Azerbaijan)	0 – 0 (0 – 1 agg.)	(Scotland) Celtic	Baku, Azerbaijan
		BBC Sport		Stadium: Tofiq Bahramov Stadium; Referee: Martin Strömbergsson (Sweden)

19 August 2015 Play-off	Celtic (Scotland)	3 – 2	(Sweden) Malmö FF	Glasgow, Scotland
	Griffiths 3', 61'; Bitton 10'	BBC Sport	Berget 52', 90'	Stadium: Celtic Park; Referee: Felix Brych (Germany)

25 August 2015 Play-off	Malmö FF (Sweden)	2 – 0 (4 – 3 agg.)	(Scotland) Celtic	Malmö, Sweden
	Rosenberg 23'; Boyata 54' (o.g.)	BBC Sport		Stadium: Swedbank Stadion; Referee: Milorad Mažić (Serbia)

UEFA Europa League

17 September 2015 Group A	Ajax (Netherlands)	2 – 2	(Scotland) Celtic	Amsterdam, Netherlands
	Fischer 24'; Schöne 84'	BBC Sport	Bitton 8'; Lustig 42'	Stadium: Amsterdam Arena; Referee: Luca Banti (Italy)

1 October 2015 Group A	Celtic (Scotland)	2 – 2	(Turkey) Fenerbahçe	Glasgow, Scotland
	Griffiths 28'; Commons 32'	BBC Sport	Fernandão 43', 48'	Stadium: Celtic Park; Referee: Kenn Hansen (Denmark)

22 October 2015 Group A	Molde (Norway)	3 – 1	(Scotland) Celtic	Molde, Norway
	Kamara 11'; Forren 18'; Elyounoussi 56'	BBC Sport	Commons 55'	Stadium: Aker Stadion; Referee: Vladislav Bezborodov (Russia)

5 November 2015 Group A	Celtic (Scotland)	1 – 2	(Norway) Molde	Glasgow, Scotland
	Commons 26'	BBC Sport	Elyounoussi 21'; Hestad 37'	Stadium: Celtic Park; Referee: Slavko Vinčić (Slovenia)

26 November 2015 Group A	Celtic (Scotland)	1 – 2	(Netherlands) Ajax	Glasgow, Scotland
	McGregor 3'	BBC Sport	Milik 22'; Černý 87'	Stadium: Celtic Park; Referee: Felix Zwayer (Germany)

10 December 2015 Group A	Fenerbahçe (Turkey)	1 – 1	(Scotland) Celtic	Istanbul, Turkey
	Marković 39'	BBC Sport	Commons 75'	Stadium: Şükrü Saracoğlu Stadium; Referee: Serge Gumienny (Belgium)

=== Aberdeen ===
UEFA Europa League

2 July 2015 First qualifying	Shkëndija (North Macedonia)	1 – 1	(Scotland) Aberdeen	Skopje, Macedonia
	Kirovski 84'	BBC Sport	McGinn 79'	Stadium: Philip II Arena; Referee: Tolga Özkalfa (Turkey)

9 July 2015 First qualifying	Aberdeen (Scotland)	0 – 0 (1 – 1 agg.)	(North Macedonia) Shkëndija	Aberdeen, Scotland
		BBC Sport		Stadium: Pittodrie Stadium; Referee: Nikolaj Hänni (Switzerland)

16 July 2015 Second qualifying	Rijeka (Croatia)	0 – 3	(Scotland) Aberdeen	Rijeka, Croatia
		BBC Sport	Considine 38'; Pawlett 52'; McLean 75'	Stadium: Stadion Kantrida; Referee: Amaury Delerue (France)

23 July 2015 Second qualifying	Aberdeen (Scotland)	2 – 2 (5 – 2 agg.)	(Croatia) Rijeka	Aberdeen, Scotland
	McGinn 64'; Hayes 72'	BBC Sport	Tomasov 58'; Kvržić 63'	Stadium: Pittodrie Stadium; Attendance: 15,803; Referee: Marco Guida (Italy)

30 July 2015 Third qualifying	Kairat (Kazakhstan)	2 – 1	(Scotland) Aberdeen	Almaty, Kazakhstan
	Bakayev 13'; Islamkhan 22'	BBC Sport	McLean 69'	Stadium: Central Stadium; Referee: Tamás Bognar (Hungary)

6 August 2015 Third qualifying	Aberdeen (Scotland)	1 – 1 (2 – 3 agg.)	(Kazakhstan) Kairat	Aberdeen, Scotland
	McLean 84'	BBC Sport	Gohou 59'	Stadium: Pittodrie Stadium; Attendance: 20,317; Referee: Miroslav Zelinka (Czech Republic)

=== Inverness Caledonian Thistle ===
UEFA Europa League

16 July 2015 Second qualifying	Inverness Caledonian Thistle (Scotland)	0 – 1	(Romania) Astra Giurgiu	Inverness, Scotland
		BBC Sport	Budescu 24'	Stadium: Caledonian Stadium; Attendance: 5,534; Referee: Ken Henry Johnsen (Norway)

23 July 2015 Second qualifying	Astra Giurgiu (Romania)	0 – 0 (1 – 0 agg.)	(Scotland) Inverness Caledonian Thistle	Giurgiu, Romania
		BBC Sport		Stadium: Stadionul Marin Anastasovici; Referee: Artyom Kuchin (Kazakhstan)

=== St Johnstone ===
UEFA Europa League

2 July 2015 First qualifying	Alashkert (Armenia)	1 – 0	(Scotland) St Johnstone	Yerevan, Armenia
	Manasyan 59'	BBC Sport		Stadium: Vazgen Sargsyan Republican Stadium; Referee: Jakob Kehlet (Denmark)

9 July 2015 First qualifying	St Johnstone (Scotland)	2 – 1 (2 – 2 agg.)	(Armenia) Alashkert	Perth, Scotland
	O'Halloran 34'; McKay 86'	BBC Sport	Gyozalyan 73'	Stadium: McDiarmid Park; Referee: Fredy Fautrel (France)

== Scotland national team ==
4 September 2015 Euro 2016 qualifying	Georgia	1 – 0	Scotland	Tbilisi
	Qazaishvili 37'	BBC Sport		Stadium: Boris Paichadze Dinamo Arena; Referee: Ovidiu Hategan (Romania)

7 September 2015 Euro 2016 qualifying	Scotland	2 – 3	Germany	Glasgow
	Hummels 28' (o.g.); McArthur 43'	BBC Sport	Müller 18', 34'; Gündoğan 54'	Stadium: Hampden Park; Attendance: 50,753; Referee: Björn Kuipers (Netherlands)

8 October 2015 Euro 2016 qualifying	Scotland	2 – 2	Poland	Glasgow
	Ritchie 45'; Fletcher 62'	BBC Sport	Lewandowski 3', 90'	Stadium: Hampden Park; Referee: Viktor Kassai (Hungary)

11 October 2015 Euro 2016 qualifying	Gibraltar	0 – 6	Scotland	Faro, Portugal
		BBC Sport	Ritchie 24'; Maloney 39'; Fletcher 52', 56', 85'; Naismith 90'	Stadium: Estádio Algarve; Attendance: 12,401; Referee: Aleksei Kulbakov (Belarus)

24 March 2016 Friendly	Czech Republic	0 – 1	Scotland	Prague
		BBC Sport	Anya 10'	Stadium: Generali Arena; Attendance: 14,580; Referee: Paul McLaughlin (Ireland)

29 March 2016 Friendly	Scotland	1 – 0	Denmark	Glasgow
	Ritchie 8'	BBC Sport		Stadium: Hampden Park; Attendance: 18,385; Referee: Svein Oddvar Moen (Norway)

29 May 2016 Friendly	Italy	1 – 0	Scotland	Ta' Qali, Malta
	Pellè 57'	BBC Sport		Stadium: Ta' Qali National Stadium; Attendance: 8,000; Referee: Alan Sant (Malta)

4 June 2016 Friendly	France	3 – 0	Scotland	Metz
	Giroud 8', 35'; Koscielny 39'	BBC Sport		Stadium: Stade Saint-Symphorien; Attendance: 25,057; Referee: Sébastien Delferière (Belgium)

== Women's football ==
=== Scottish Women's Premier League ===
Pos	Team	Pld	W	D	L	GF	GA	GD	Pts	Qualification or relegation
1	Glasgow City (C, Q)	21	19	2	0	99	11	+88	59	2016–17 Champions League
2	Hibernian (Q)	21	17	2	2	72	20	+52	53	2016–17 Champions League
3	Celtic	21	11	2	8	54	28	+26	35	
4	Aberdeen	21	10	4	7	32	24	+8	34	
5	Spartans	21	8	1	12	44	38	+6	25	
6	Rangers	21	8	0	13	30	57	−27	24	
7	Stirling University	21	11	3	7	45	31	+14	36	
8	Forfar Farmington	21	11	1	9	45	40	+5	34	
9	Heart of Midlothian (R)	21	6	4	11	27	52	−25	22	2016 SPWL 2
10	Hamilton Academical (R)	21	7	1	13	24	62	−38	22	2016 SPWL 2
11	Hutchison Vale (R)	21	5	3	13	31	65	−34	18	2016 SPWL 2
12	Inverness City (R)	21	0	3	18	14	89	−75	3	2016 SPWL 2

Source: Scottish Women's FA
Rules for classification: 1) Points; 2) Goal difference; 3) Number of goals scored
(C) Champions; (Q) Qualified for the phase indicated; (R) Relegated

=== League and Cup honours ===
Division	Winner
2015 Scottish Women's Premier League	Glasgow City
SWFL First Division	Glasgow Girls
SWFL Second Division North	
SWFL Second Division West/South West	
SWFL Second Division East/Central	
SWFL Second Division South East	

Competition	Winner	Score	Runner-up	Match report
2015 Scottish Women's Cup	Glasgow City	3 – 0	Hibernian	BBC Sport
2015 Scottish Women's Premier League Cup	Glasgow City	2 – 1 (AET)	Hibernian	BBC Sport
SWFL First Division Cup				
SWFL Second Division Cup				

=== Individual honours ===
==== SWPL awards ====
Award	Winner	Team
Players' Player of the Year		
Player of the Year		
Manager of the Year		
Young Player of the Year		

=== UEFA Women's Champions League ===
==== Glasgow City ====
8 October 2015 Round of 32	Chelsea (England)	1–0	(Scotland) Glasgow City	Wheatsheaf Park, Staines-upon-Thames
20:30	Kirby 39'	Report		Attendance: 1,100; Referee: Olga Zadinová (Czech Republic)

14 October 2015 Round of 32	Glasgow City (Scotland)	0–3 (0–4 agg.)	(England) Chelsea	Excelsior Stadium, Airdrie
20:30		Report	Aluko 22'; Kirby 57'; Flaherty 61'	Attendance: 1,199; Referee: Bibiana Steinhaus (Germany)

=== Scotland women's national team ===
17 September 2015 Friendly	Scotland	0–4	Norway	Firhill Stadium, Glasgow
		BBC Sport	Haavi; Hegerberg; Berge; Wold

22 September 2015 Euro 2017 qualifying	Slovenia	0–3	Scotland	Ajdovščina Stadium, Ajdovščina
		BBC Sport	28', 49', 59' Little	Attendance: 794; Referee: Sandra Bastos (Portugal)

23 October 2015 Euro 2017 qualifying	Scotland	7–0	Belarus	Fir Park, Motherwell
	Ross 44', 66'; Weir 46'; Corsie 53'; Evans 68'; Love 89', 90'	BBC Sport		Attendance: 1,367; Referee: Carina Susanna Vitulano (Italy)

27 October 2015 Euro 2017 qualifying	North Macedonia	1–4	Scotland	FFM Training Centre, Skopje
	Rochi 44'	BBC Sport	22' Little; 27', 28' Corsie; 31' Weir	Referee: Anastasia Pustovoitova (Russia)

29 November 2015 Euro 2017 qualifying	Scotland	10–0	North Macedonia	St Mirren Park, Paisley
	Ross 3', 59', 61', 87'; Love 8', 40', 53'; Beattie 24'; Lauder 27'; Evans 35'	BBC Sport

26 January 2016 Friendly	Sweden	6–0	Scotland	Prioritet Serneke Arena, Gothenburg
	Dahlkvist 40'; Eriksson 45'; Jakobsson 45+1'; Schelin 68'; Hammarlund 78', 83'	Scottish FA

8 March 2016 Friendly	Scotland	1–1	Spain	Falkirk Stadium, Falkirk
	Mitchell 55'	Scottish FA	90' Torrecilla

8 April 2016 Euro 2017 qualifying	Scotland	3–1	Slovenia	St Mirren Park, Paisley
	Ross 19', 44'; Little 52' (pen.)	BBC Sport	Erman 42'

3 June 2016 Euro 2017 qualifying	Scotland	0–4	Iceland	Falkirk Stadium, Falkirk
		BBC Sport	Gísladóttir 10'; Þorsteinsdóttir 62'; Jónsdóttir 65'; Viðarsdóttir 69'	Attendance: 2,690; Referee: Jana Adamkova (Czech Republic)

7 June 2016 Euro 2017 qualifying	Belarus	0–1	Scotland	FC Minsk Stadium, Minsk
		BBC Sport	Love 15'	Referee: Marta Frias Acedo (Spain)

== Deaths ==
- 10 July: Jimmy Murray, 82, Hearts, Falkirk, Clyde, Raith Rovers and Scotland forward.
- 2 August: Sammy Cox, 91, Queen's Park, Third Lanark, Dundee, Rangers, East Fife and Scotland defender.
- 6 August: Danny Hegan, 72, Albion Rovers midfielder.
- 16 August: George Merchant, 89, Dundee and Falkirk forward.
- 29 August: Graham Leggat, 81, Aberdeen and Scotland forward.
- 6 September: Ralph Milne, 54, Dundee United winger.
- 6 September: Hugh Ormond, 92, Dundee United and St Mirren full back.
- 12 September: Jim Doherty, 61, Albion Rovers and Stranraer midfielder.
- 1 October: Joe Wark, 67, Motherwell defender.
- 2 October: Johnny Paton, 92, Celtic winger.
- 17 October: Johnny Hamilton, 66, Rangers, Hibernian and St Johnstone midfielder.
- 23 October: Peter Price, 83, St Mirren, Ayr United, Raith Rovers and Albion Rovers forward.
- 25 October: Matt Watson, 79, Kilmarnock and Queen of the South full-back.
- 5 November: Brown McMaster, 66, Scottish Football League president (2007–09); Partick Thistle and Stenhousemuir executive.
- 15 November: Jackie McGugan, 76, St Mirren, Ayr United and Morton defender.
- 5 December: Willie Coburn, 74, St Johnstone, Forfar and Cowdenbeath defender.
- 6 December: Ian Burns, 76, Aberdeen and Brechin City wing half.
- 8 December: Alan Hodgkinson, 79, Scotland goalkeeping coach.
- 10 December: Arnold Peralta, 26, Rangers midfielder.
- December: Duncan Lambie, 63, Dundee, St Johnstone and Hibernian forward.
- 19 January: Joachim Fernandez, 43, Dundee United defender.
- 22 January: Tommy Bryceland, 76, St Mirren forward and manager.
- January: John Dowie, 60, Celtic and Clyde defender
- 28 January: Dave Thomson, 77, Dunfermline Athletic, Queen of the South, Berwick Rangers and East Stirlingshire forward.
- 28 January: Tommy O'Hara, 62, Queen of the South, Motherwell, Falkirk and Partick Thistle midfielder.
- 4 February: Harry Glasgow, 76, Clyde, Arbroath and Stenhousemuir defender, Stenhousemuir manager.
- 24 February: Jim McFadzean, 77, Heart of Midlothian, St Mirren, Raith Rovers, Kilmarnock and Ayr United defender.
- 4 March: Eddie Blyth, 91, St Mirren forward.
- 11 March: Billy Ritchie, 79, Rangers, Partick Thistle, Motherwell, Stranraer and Scotland goalkeeper.
- 22 March: Les Thomson, 79, Falkirk, Stirling Albion and Stenhousemuir centre-half.
- 31 March: Ian Britton, 61, Dundee United and Arbroath midfielder.
- 31 March: Jimmy Toner, 91, Dundee inside forward.
- 7 May: Chris Mitchell, 27, Falkirk, Ayr United, Bradford City, Queen of the South and Clyde midfielder.
- 8 May: George Ross, 73, Preston North End full back.
- 11 May: Bobby Carroll, 77, Celtic, St Mirren, Dundee United and Queen of the South winger.
- 14 May: Jim Finlayson, East Fife, Forfar Athletic and Montrose forward.
- 14 May: John Coyle, 83, Dundee United, Brechin City and Clyde forward.
- 25 May: Ian Gibson, 73, Scotland under-23 international.
- 20 June: Willie Logie, 83, Rangers, Aberdeen, Arbroath, Brechin City and Alloa Athletic wing half.
