= 2021–22 South of Scotland Football League =

South of Scotland Football League
- Season: 2021–22
- Dates: 17 July 2021 – 16 May 2022
- Champions: St Cuthbert Wanderers
- Matches: 156
- Goals: 737 (4.72 per match)
- Biggest home win: Threave Rovers 13–0 Caledonian Braves reserves (17 July 2021)
- Biggest away win: Wigtown & Bladnoch 0–12 Abbey Vale (25 September 2021)
- Highest scoring: Threave Rovers 13–0 Caledonian Braves reserves (17 July 2021)
- Longest winning run: 16 matches: St Cuthbert Wanderers
- Longest unbeaten run: 17 matches: St Cuthbert Wanderers
- Longest winless run: 17 matches: Wigtown & Bladnoch
- Longest losing run: 11 matches: Wigtown & Bladnoch

The 2021–22 South of Scotland Football League was the 76th season of the South of Scotland Football League, and the 8th season as the sixth tier of the Scottish football pyramid system. Stranraer reserves continued as the reigning champions due to the previous two seasons being declared null and void. The season began on 17 July 2021.

St Cuthbert Wanderers won the league title for the first time since the 2015–16 season, sealing the championship with a 6–2 victory over Nithsdale Wanderers on 27 April 2022.

== Teams ==
Location of teams in 2021–22 South of Scotland Football League

Heston Rovers elected not to compete during the 2021–22 season.

Team	Location	Home ground	Capacity	Seats	Floodlit
Abbey Vale	New Abbey	Maryfield Park	1,000	0	No
Caledonian Braves reserves	Motherwell	Alliance Park	500	100	Yes
Creetown	Creetown	Castlecary Park	1,000	0	Yes
Lochar Thistle	Dumfries	North West Community Campus	1,000	0	Yes
Lochmaben	Lochmaben	Whitehills Park	1,000	0	No
Mid-Annandale	Lockerbie	New King Edward Park	1,000	0	Yes
Newton Stewart ^{[SFA]}	Newton Stewart	Blairmount Park	1,500	0	Yes
Nithsdale Wanderers	Sanquhar	Lorimer Park	1,000	0	Yes
St Cuthbert Wanderers ^{[SFA]}	Kirkcudbright	St Mary's Park	2,000	0	Yes
Stranraer reserves	Stranraer	Stair Park	4,178	1,830	Yes
Threave Rovers ^{[SFA]}	Castle Douglas	Meadow Park	1,500		Yes
Upper Annandale	Moffat	Moffat Academy	1,000	0	No
Wigtown & Bladnoch ^{[SFA]}	Wigtown	Trammondford Park	888	0	Yes

^{SFA} Club with an SFA Licence eligible to participate in the Lowland League promotion play-off should they win the league.

Caledonian Braves reserves and Stranraer reserves are ineligible for promotion.

== League table ==
Pos	Team	Pld	W	D	L	GF	GA	GD	Pts	Qualification
1	St Cuthbert Wanderers (C)	24	20	2	2	93	33	+60	62	Qualification for the Lowland League play-off
2	Threave Rovers	24	17	2	5	85	28	+57	53	Transferred to the West of Scotland League
3	Abbey Vale	24	16	1	7	72	33	+39	49	
4	Newton Stewart	24	14	4	6	74	46	+28	46	
5	Creetown	24	12	6	6	46	33	+13	42	
6	Stranraer reserves	24	12	4	8	63	48	+15	40	Ineligible for promotion
7	Upper Annandale	24	9	3	12	47	64	−17	30	
8	Caledonian Braves reserves	24	9	2	13	50	73	−23	29	Ineligible for promotion
9	Nithsdale Wanderers	24	8	4	12	64	64	0	28	
10	Lochmaben	24	7	4	13	37	54	−17	25	
11	Lochar Thistle	24	6	2	16	43	63	−20	20	
12	Mid-Annandale	24	5	5	14	44	84	−40	20	
13	Wigtown & Bladnoch	24	1	1	22	19	114	−95	4	

Rules for classification: 1) Points; 2) Goal difference; 3) Number of goals scored
(C) Champions

== Results ==
Home \ Away	ABB	CAL	CRE	LOT	LOC	MID	NEW	NIT	SCW	STR	THR	UPA	WIG
Abbey Vale		4–1	1–4	3–0	1–3	2–2	6–1	2–0	2–1	1–0	2–1	4–1	8–0
Caledonian Braves reserves	2–0		1–2	3–1	5–1	3–2	2–4	5–3	1–3	1–6	0–1 (Note: Match played at New King Edward Park, Lockerbie, due to a clashing fixture.)	3–2	3–1
Creetown	1–2	4–1		2–0	2–1	4–1	0–5	1–1	2–2	2–1	1–2	2–2	2–0
Lochar Thistle	1–3	2–0	0–1		2–3 (Note: Match played at Palmerston Park.)	4–5	0–4	1–5	1–3	1–3	3–2	2–3	7–0
Lochmaben	1–5	3–1	1–3	1–4		3–3	1–3	1–2	0–2	1–1	1–4	1–2	3–1
Mid-Annandale	1–3	3–3	0–3	2–2	1–1		1–10	0–7	2–4	2–3	1–7	0–5	6–0
Newton Stewart	2–0	3–3	2–1	4–3	2–1	1–2		1–4	1–1	5–1	0–2	3–2	6–2
Nithsdale Wanderers	1–2	3–5	0–0	3–4	3–5	5–2	2–2		0–8	1–3	1–3	7–2	1–1
St Cuthbert Wanderers	3–2	4–1	5–1	6–0	2–1	3–0	4–2	6–2		3–5	3–2	4–0	6–3
Stranraer reserves	4–0	2–4	2–2	3–1	0–0	2–3	2–2	4–0	2–4		4–1	3–1	5–0
Threave Rovers	3–1	13–0	0–0	1–0	3–0	5–1	4–2	6–0	2–4	6–0		1–1 (Note: Match played at Palmerston Park, Dumfries.)	6–0
Upper Annandale	0–6	4–1 (Note: Match played at New King Edward Park, Lockerbie.)	3–1 (Note: Match played at New King Edward Park, Lockerbie.)	1–1	0–1	4–1 (Note: Match played at New King Edward Park, Lockerbie.)	0–5	0–4	0–4 (Note: Match played at Dumfries High School, Dumfries.)	6–4	3–5		2–1
Wigtown & Bladnoch	0–12	2–1	0–5	2–3 (Note: Match played at Blairmount Park, Newton Stewart.)	2–3	0–3	2–4	0–9	1–8	1–3	0–5	0–3	

Legend: Blue = home team win; Yellow = draw; Red = away team win.
