= 2019–20 South of Scotland Football League =

South of Scotland Football League
- Season: 2019–20
- Dates: 27 July 2019 – 25 April 2020
- Matches: 150 (Note: 12 matches and 87 goals were expunged from the overall tallies, following Dumfries YMCA's withdrawal from the league.)
- Goals: 675 (4.5 per match)
- Biggest home win: Abbey Vale 11–1 Wigtown & Bladnoch; (31 July 2019) (Note: Bonnyton Thistle 15–1 Dumfries YMCA on 5 October 2019 was expunged, following Dumfries YMCA's withdrawal from the league.)
- Biggest away win: Newton Stewart 0–7 Stranraer reserves; (19 October 2019) (Note: Dumfries YMCA 0–8 Bonnyton Thistle on 26 October 2019 was expunged, following Dumfries YMCA's withdrawal from the league.)
- Highest scoring: Abbey Vale 11–1 Wigtown & Bladnoch; (31 July 2019)
- Longest winning run: 10 games: Stranraer reserves (Note: One win against Dumfries YMCA expunged.)
- Longest unbeaten run: 19 games: Threave Rovers
- Longest winless run: 12 games: Lochmaben (Note: Dumfries YMCA's 12-match losing (and therefore, winless) streak was expunged following their withdrawal from the league.)
- Longest losing run: 7 games: Heston Rovers

The 2019–20 South of Scotland Football League was the 74th season of the South of Scotland Football League, and the sixth season as the sixth tier of the Scottish football pyramid system. Stranraer reserves were the reigning champions.

The league remained at 16 teams despite the withdrawal of Annan Athletic reserves, as Caledonian Braves reserves (formerly Edusport Academy) joined the league. However, 12 matches into the season Dumfries YMCA withdrew.

The season began on 27 July 2019 and was scheduled to end on 25 April 2020, but on 13 March the league was indefinitely suspended due to the COVID-19 pandemic. On 4 May, the league voted to declare the season null and void.

== Teams ==
Location of teams in 2019–20 South of Scotland Football League
Location of teams in 2019–20 South of Scotland Football League within Dumfries & Galloway

The following teams changed division after the 2018–19 season.

=== To South of Scotland League ===
- Caledonian Braves reserves

=== From South of Scotland League ===
- Annan Athletic reserves

| Team | Location | Home ground | Capacity | Seats | Floodlit |
|---|---|---|---|---|---|
| Abbey Vale | New Abbey | Maryfield Park | 1,000 | 0 | No |
| Bonnyton Thistle | Kilmarnock | Bonnyton Park | 1,000 | 100 | Yes |
| Caledonian Braves reserves | Motherwell | Alliance Park | 500 | 100 | Yes |
| Creetown | Creetown | Castlecary Park | 1,000 | 0 | No |
| Dumfries YMCA | Dumfries | Kingholm Park | 500 | 0 | Yes |
| Heston Rovers | Dumfries | Palmerston Park | 8,690 | 3,377 | Yes |
| Lochar Thistle | Dumfries | North West Community Campus | 1,000 | 0 | Yes |
| Lochmaben | Lochmaben | Whitehills Park | 1,000 | 0 | No |
| Mid-Annandale | Lockerbie | New King Edward Park | 1,000 | 0 | No |
| Newton Stewart ^{[SFA]} | Newton Stewart | Blairmount Park | 1,500 | 0 | Yes |
| Nithsdale Wanderers | Sanquhar | Lorimer Park | 1,000 | 0 | Yes |
| St Cuthbert Wanderers ^{[SFA]} | Kirkcudbright | St Mary's Park | 2,000 | 0 | Yes |
| Stranraer reserves | Stranraer | Stair Park | 4,178 | 1,830 | Yes |
| Threave Rovers ^{[SFA]} | Castle Douglas | Meadow Park | 1,500 | | Yes |
| Upper Annandale | Moffat | Moffat Academy | 1,000 | 0 | No |
| Wigtown & Bladnoch ^{[SFA]} | Wigtown | Trammondford Park | 888 | 0 | No |

^{SFA} Club has an SFA Licence (as of July 2019) and would have been eligible to participate in the Lowland League promotion play-off should they win the league. However, this was cancelled following the Lowland League's curtailment in April 2020.

== League table at time of abandonment ==
| Pos | Team | Pld | W | D | L | GF | GA | GD | Pts | |
|---|---|---|---|---|---|---|---|---|---|---|
| 1 | Threave Rovers | 20 | 17 | 2 | 1 | 70 | 17 | +53 | 53 | |
| 2 | Stranraer reserves | 16 | 14 | 1 | 1 | 55 | 14 | +41 | 43 | |
| 3 | Abbey Vale | 17 | 13 | 2 | 2 | 62 | 17 | +45 | 41 | |
| 4 | Bonnyton Thistle | 20 | 12 | 4 | 4 | 60 | 34 | +26 | 40 | Transferred to West of Scotland Football League |
| 5 | Mid-Annandale | 23 | 12 | 4 | 7 | 70 | 56 | +14 | 40 | |
| 6 | Newton Stewart | 22 | 10 | 4 | 8 | 50 | 52 | −2 | 34 | |
| 7 | Nithsdale Wanderers | 18 | 7 | 4 | 7 | 50 | 42 | +8 | 25 | |
| 8 | Heston Rovers | 22 | 7 | 4 | 11 | 45 | 52 | −7 | 25 | |
| 9 | St Cuthbert Wanderers | 23 | 6 | 5 | 12 | 43 | 55 | −12 | 23 | |
| 10 | Caledonian Braves reserves | 19 | 6 | 3 | 10 | 30 | 48 | −18 | 21 | |
| 11 | Lochar Thistle | 22 | 5 | 4 | 13 | 32 | 55 | −23 | 19 | |
| 12 | Upper Annandale | 18 | 6 | 0 | 12 | 30 | 56 | −26 | 18 | |
| 13 | Wigtown & Bladnoch | 22 | 4 | 4 | 14 | 33 | 80 | −47 | 16 | |
| 14 | Lochmaben | 21 | 4 | 3 | 14 | 24 | 55 | −31 | 15 | |
| 15 | Creetown | 17 | 3 | 4 | 10 | 21 | 42 | −21 | 13 | |
| 16 | Dumfries YMCA | 0 | 0 | 0 | 0 | 0 | 0 | 0 | 0 | Withdrawn; record expunged |

Source: South of Scotland Football League
Rules for classification: 1) Points; 2) Goal difference; 3) Number of goals scored
