= Dumfries & District Amateur Football League =

- Founded: 1954
- Folded: 2014
- Country: Scotland
- Confederation: UEFA
- Level on pyramid: N/A
- Promotion to: None
- Relegation to: None
- Domestic cup(s): Scottish Amateur Cup
- Most championships: Kirkconnel Amateurs (11 titles)
- Website: Official website

The Dumfries & District Amateur Football League (DDAFL) was a football league competition for amateur teams in the Dumfries area of Scotland. It was founded in 1954 and ran through until 2014 when the league disbanded, with member clubs subsequently joining different amateur leagues or the South of Scotland Football League.

== History ==
The league's first championship took place in the 1954–55 season, with Dumfries Amateurs the inaugural victors. The league continued through until 2014 when it was disbanded following its final season featuring only seven clubs. Of these, 2013–14 and final champions Lochmaben joined the North & South Lanarkshire AFA whereas Upper Annandale & Dumfries YMCA became members of the South of Scotland Football League.

== Former DDAFL members ==
- Mid-Annandale F.C.
- Lochar Thistle F.C.
- Upper Annandale F.C.
- Dumfries YMCA
- Heston Rovers F.C.
- Abbey Vale F.C.
