= 2020–21 South of Scotland Football League =

South of Scotland Football League
- Season: 2020–21
- Dates: 10 October 2020 – 1 April 2021 (abandoned)
- Matches: 58
- Goals: 284 (4.9 per match)
- Biggest home win: Stranraer reserves 8–0 Creetown (6 November 2020); Threave Rovers 8–0 Lochmaben (5 December 2020)
- Biggest away win: Creetown 1–8 Threave Rovers (10 October 2020)
- Highest scoring: Caledonian Braves reserves 7–4 Nithsdale Wanderers (7 November 2020)
- Longest winning run: 3 matches: 4 teams
- Longest unbeaten run: 8 matches: Stranraer reserves
- Longest winless run: 7 matches: Lochar Thistle
- Longest losing run: 4 matches: 3 teams

The 2020–21 South of Scotland Football League was the 75th season of the South of Scotland Football League, and the 7th season as the sixth tier of the Scottish football pyramid system. Stranraer reserves continued as the reigning champions due to the previous season being declared null and void.

The start of the league season was delayed until October 2020 because of the COVID-19 pandemic, and games were played behind closed doors due to Scottish Government restrictions.

On 11 January 2021 the league was suspended by the Scottish Football Association due to the escalating pandemic situation. On 1 April clubs voted to declare the season Null and void.

== Teams ==
Location of teams in 2020–21 South of Scotland Football League

The following teams changed division after the 2019–20 season.

=== From South of Scotland League ===
Transferred to West of Scotland League

- Bonnyton Thistle

Team	Location	Home ground	Capacity	Seats	Floodlit
Abbey Vale	New Abbey	Maryfield Park	1,000	0	No
Caledonian Braves reserves	Motherwell	Alliance Park	500	100	Yes
Creetown	Creetown	Castlecary Park	1,000	0	Yes
Heston Rovers	Dumfries	Palmerston Park	8,690	3,377	Yes
Lochar Thistle	Dumfries	North West Community Campus	1,000	0	Yes
Lochmaben	Lochmaben	Whitehills Park	1,000	0	No
Mid-Annandale	Lockerbie	New King Edward Park	1,000	0	Yes
Newton Stewart ^{[SFA]}	Newton Stewart	Blairmount Park	1,500	0	Yes
Nithsdale Wanderers	Sanquhar	Lorimer Park	1,000	0	Yes
St Cuthbert Wanderers ^{[SFA]}	Kirkcudbright	St Mary's Park	2,000	0	Yes
Stranraer reserves	Stranraer	Stair Park	4,178	1,830	Yes
Threave Rovers ^{[SFA]}	Castle Douglas	Meadow Park	1,500		Yes
Upper Annandale	Moffat	Moffat Academy	1,000	0	No
Wigtown & Bladnoch ^{[SFA]}	Wigtown	Trammondford Park	888	0	No

^{SFA} Club with an SFA Licence eligible to participate in the Lowland League promotion play-off should they win the league.

Caledonian Braves reserves and Stranraer reserves are ineligible for promotion.

== League table ==
Pos	Team	Pld	W	D	L	GF	GA	GD	Pts	Promotion, qualification or relegation
1	Stranraer reserves	11	8	2	1	40	13	+27	26	Ineligible for promotion
2	Threave Rovers	7	6	0	1	33	10	+23	18	
3	St Cuthbert Wanderers	7	5	1	1	17	7	+10	16	
4	Newton Stewart	9	4	3	2	27	20	+7	15	
5	Nithsdale Wanderers	8	5	0	3	28	25	+3	15	
6	Abbey Vale	8	4	2	2	19	13	+6	14	
7	Upper Annandale	9	4	0	5	19	21	−2	12	
8	Wigtown & Bladnoch	8	4	0	4	12	17	−5	12	
9	Caledonian Braves reserves	6	3	1	2	19	14	+5	10	Ineligible for promotion
10	Lochar Thistle	11	3	1	7	20	26	−6	10	
11	Lochmaben	8	1	3	4	14	29	−15	6	
12	Mid-Annandale	7	1	1	5	13	24	−11	4	
13	Heston Rovers	10	1	1	8	13	34	−21	4	
14	Creetown	7	1	1	5	10	31	−21	4	

Source: South of Scotland Football League
Rules for classification: 1) Points; 2) Goal difference; 3) Number of goals scored
