= Cumnock Springbank F.C. =

Former association football club in Scotland

Cumnock Springbank
- Full name: Cumnnock Springbank Football Club
- Nickname(s): Springbank
- Founded: 1891
- Dissolved: 1894
- Ground: New Station Park
- Secretary: H. M. Hyslop
Home colours

Cumnock Springbank Football Club was an association football club from Cumnock, Ayrshire, Scotland.

== History ==
The club was formed in 1891. The club's successes as a junior club in its first season - amongst its victories was a four-goal win over the Mauchline club - encouraged it to turn senior for 1892–93. However it only played two seasons of competitive football.

The club was one of the founder members of the South of Scotland Football League in 1892–93. The seven-team league was a failure, not coming close to completion, and the club lost all three of its played matches.

Springbank was formed too late to be able to enter the main stages of the Scottish Cup, and had to enter the qualifying rounds. In 1892–93 it lost 5–1 to Kilbirnie in a replay in the first qualifying round. The following season the club was humiliated with a 12–2 loss at Newmilns, again in the first qualifying round.

The club had just as little success in the Ayrshire Cup. It protested two defeats against Mauchline in the first round in 1892–93, the second protest (on the basis that the goalposts were the wrong size) rejected for being made in an improper fashion. In 1893–94 it got through to the second round on a successful protest against the crowd behaviour at Cronberry Eglinton in the first round, but lost 9–0 at Hurlford in the second.

== Colours ==
The club wore blue and white shirts with blue knickers.

== Ground ==
The club played at New Station Park, which had been the ground of the previous senior club in the town, Cumnock F.C. (1875).
