= Saltire City F.C. =

Association football club in Scotland

Saltire City
- Full name: Saltire City Football Club
- Nickname: the City
- Founded: 2025
- Ground: John Cumming Stadium, Carluke
- Capacity: 1,500
- Coordinates: 55°44′8″N 3°49′19″W
- Manager: Paul Davies
- League: South of Scotland League
Home colours

Saltire City Football Club is an association football club from Shettleston, Glasgow, playing in the South of Scotland League.

== History ==
The club was founded by Paul Davies in 2025. It sought to join the West of Scotland League, but found it was not accepting new members, so instead applied to join the South of Scotland League; its application was accepted in time for the 2026–27 season.

The club's first match was a 3–1 defeat at Creetown on 1 August 2025. A week later City recorded its first victory, at St Cuthbert's Wanderers; in the South of Scotland League Cup, it recorded an 8–1 victory at home to Wigtown & Bladnoch.

== Colours ==
The club wears all black.

== Ground ==
The club's home ground is Budhill Park in Shettleston, but the South of Scotland League requirements mean that the club cannot use it, and at least for 2026–27 is using the John Cumming Stadium in Carluke.
