= List of listed buildings in New Abbey, Dumfries and Galloway =

This is a list of listed buildings in the civil parish of New Abbey in Dumfries and Galloway, Scotland.

== List ==
| Name | Location | Date Listed | Grid Ref. (Note: Sometimes known as OSGB36, the grid reference (where provided) is based on the British national grid reference system used by the Ordnance Survey. • "Guide to National Grid". Ordnance Survey. • "Get-a-map". Ordnance Survey.) | Geo-coordinates | Notes | LB Number (Note: Historic Environment Scotland assign a unique alphanumeric identifier to each designated site in Scotland, for listed buildings this always begins with "LB", for example "LB12345".) | Image |
|---|---|---|---|---|---|---|---|
| Carse Farmhouse And Steading Range Adjoining To South West | | | | 54°58′33″N 3°35′59″W | Category C(S) | 17315 | Upload Photo |
| New Abbey Village New Abbey Mill | | | | 54°58′48″N 3°37′23″W | Category A | 17323 | Upload another image See more images |
| Mossyard Cottage And Former Steading | | | | 54°59′12″N 3°40′35″W | Category C(S) | 17342 | Upload Photo |
| New Abbey Village The Square M J Carberry's Shop/Post Office, House And Warehouse | | | | 54°58′48″N 3°37′19″W | Category C(S) | 17302 | Upload another image |
| Kinharvie House And Chapel | | | | 54°59′02″N 3°40′39″W | Category C(S) | 17309 | Upload Photo |
| New Abbey Village Kindar Lodge | | | | 54°58′38″N 3°37′14″W | Category B | 17318 | Upload Photo |
| New Abbey Village New Abbey Parish Church | | | | 54°58′39″N 3°37′06″W | Category B | 17324 | Upload Photo |
| New Abbey Village Abbey House | | | | 54°58′47″N 3°37′21″W | Category B | 17343 | Upload Photo |
| New Abbey Village Abbey House Garden Walls | | | | 54°58′47″N 3°37′21″W | Category B | 17344 | Upload Photo |
| 6-11 (Inclusive Nos), The Square Including Old Smithy And Former Weigh- House | | | | 54°58′47″N 3°37′18″W | Category C(S) | 49586 | Upload Photo |
| New Abbey Village Sweetheart Abbey And Precinct Walls | | | | 54°58′49″N 3°37′07″W | Category A | 17304 | Upload another image |
| Glenharvie House Dovecot | | | | 54°58′52″N 3°37′57″W | Category C(S) | 17308 | Upload Photo |
| New Abbey Village New Abbey Parish Manse 28 Main Street | | | | 54°58′47″N 3°37′09″W | Category B | 17310 | Upload Photo |
| West Shambellie Pottery (Former Bacon Factory) | | | | 54°59′19″N 3°37′37″W | Category B | 17313 | Upload Photo |
| New Abbey Village Kindar House | | | | 54°58′33″N 3°37′12″W | Category B | 17317 | Upload Photo |
| New Abbey Village Church House | | | | 54°58′47″N 3°37′24″W | Category B | 17345 | Upload Photo |
| New Abbey Village St Mary's Rc Church And Presbytery | | | | 54°58′43″N 3°36′58″W | Category B | 17311 | Upload Photo |
| New Abbey Village 21 Main Street Devorgilla Cottage And Outbuilding To West | | | | 54°58′48″N 3°37′12″W | Category B | 17320 | Upload Photo |
| New Abbey Village Main Street Rosewall | | | | 54°58′48″N 3°37′14″W | Category C(S) | 17321 | Upload Photo |
| New Abbey Village The Old House | | | | 54°58′47″N 3°37′25″W | Category A | 17346 | Upload another image |
| New Abbey Village 5 Main Street Port House | | | | 54°58′48″N 3°37′17″W | Category B | 17319 | Upload Photo |
| New Abbey Village New Abbey Bridge (A710 Over New Abbey Pow) | | | | 54°58′50″N 3°37′23″W | Category B | 17322 | Upload another image |
| New Abbey Village Kindar Cottages | | | | 54°58′38″N 3°37′10″W | Category B | 17347 | Upload Photo |
| New Abbey Village 5 The Square | | | | 54°58′47″N 3°37′19″W | Category C(S) | 17303 | Upload Photo |
| Shambellie House | | | | 54°59′00″N 3°37′33″W | Category B | 17306 | Upload Photo |
| Shambellie House Lodge And Gatepiers | | | | 54°58′58″N 3°37′22″W | Category B | 17307 | Upload Photo |
| Beeswing Village Lochend Church | | | | 55°00′20″N 3°43′46″W | Category C(S) | 17314 | Upload another image |
| Shambellie Grange Archway | | | | 54°59′07″N 3°37′11″W | Category B | 17305 | Upload Photo |
| Glenharvie House, Screen Wall And Outbuildings | | | | 54°58′53″N 3°37′56″W | Category B | 17316 | Upload Photo |
| Sweetheart Abbey Cemetery | | | | 54°58′49″N 3°37′04″W | Category C(S) | 49587 | Upload Photo |
| Waterloo Monument | | | | 54°58′26″N 3°38′17″W | Category B | 17312 | Upload another image |
| Shambellie House Walled Garden | | | | 54°58′55″N 3°37′34″W | Category C(S) | 17331 | Upload Photo |
| Shambellie House Hollinbush Cottage And Outbuildings (Formerly Shambellie Offices And Coachman's House) | | | | 54°58′52″N 3°37′22″W | Category C(S) | 17332 | Upload Photo |

== Key ==
The scheme for classifying buildings in Scotland is:

- Category A: "buildings of national or international importance, either architectural or historic; or fine, little-altered examples of some particular period, style or building type."
- Category B: "buildings of regional or more than local importance; or major examples of some particular period, style or building type, which may have been altered."
- Category C: "buildings of local importance; lesser examples of any period, style, or building type, as originally constructed or moderately altered; and simple traditional buildings which group well with other listed buildings."

In March 2016 there were 47,288 listed buildings in Scotland. Of these, 8% were Category A, and 50% were Category B, with the remaining 42% being Category C.
