= Stranraer Athletic F.C. =

Association football club in Dumfries and Galloway, Scotland

Stranraer Athletic
- Full name: Stranraer Athletic F.C.
- Founded: 1995
- Dissolved: 2008
- Ground: Stranraer Academy, London Road, Stranraer
- Capacity: 1000
- League: South of Scotland League
Home colours	Away colours

Stranraer Athletic Football Club was a football club from the town of Stranraer in Dumfries and Galloway, Scotland. They played in the South of Scotland League, although they announced that they would not participate in 2008–09 following the resignation of their manager and the failure to form a committee to run the club.

== History ==
They were formed in 1995 as at the time it was felt by those who formed the club that Stranraer were fielding players based out with the town and not giving local players a chance to exhibit their talents. A crowd of 100 turned up for the club's first ever home game at Stranraer Academy Playing Fields, where the club continued to play their home matches. However this enthusiasm was not maintained and crowds were low. Nonetheless, the club proved quite successful in the South of Scotland League, which they joined upon their creation. They finished second in their inaugural season and between seasons 2002–03 and 2004–05 they won three consecutive league titles.

The team's strip (uniform) colours were the same as Stranraer FC, blue and white.

== Honours ==
=== South of Scotland League ===
- Winners: 2002–03, 2003–04, 2004–05

=== Other Honours ===
- Potts Cup: 1995–96, 2003–04, 2004–05
- Haig Gordon Memorial Trophy: 1996–97, 2004–05
- South of Scotland League Cup: 2003–04
