= South of Scotland Football League =

Association football league in Scotland

- Founded: 1892 (original); 1946 (current)
- Country: Scotland
- Confederation: UEFA
- Divisions: 1
- Number of clubs: 12
- Level on pyramid: 6
- Promotion to: Lowland Football League
- Domestic cup(s): Scottish Cup (SFA licensed clubs and league winners); South Region Challenge Cup
- League cup(s): South of Scotland League Cup; Southern Counties FA Challenge Cup; Cree Lodge Cup; Haig Gordon Cup; Potts Cup; Tweedie Cup
- Current champions: Dalbeattie Star (7th title) (2025–26)
- Most championships: 13 titles St Cuthbert Wanderers
- Website: Official Website
- Current: 2026–27 South of Scotland Football League

The South of Scotland Football League (SoSFL) is a senior football league based in south-west Scotland. The league sits at level 6 on the Scottish football league system, acting as a feeder to the Lowland Football League.

Founded in 1946, it is currently composed of 11 member clubs in a single division. Geographically, the league currently covers Dumfries and Galloway although clubs have previously also been located in East Ayrshire and South Lanarkshire.

Since 2014–15 it has featured in the senior pyramid system. The winners take part in an end of season promotion play-off with the East of Scotland Football League and West of Scotland Football League champions, subject to clubs meeting the required licensing criteria.

== History ==
=== Original league ===
A league of the same name briefly existed during the early days of competitive football. The original South of Scotland Football League was created in 1892–93 and featured seven clubs:

- 5th Kirkcudbrightshire Rifle Volunteers
- Cronberry Eglinton
- Lanemark
- Lugar Boswell
- Mauchline
- Queen of the South Wanderers
- Springbank

The clubs preferred to play in cup competitions and traditional friendlies, so most of the league fixtures were not played. The competition was subsequently abandoned and no championship was awarded.

=== Current league ===
When league football was re-established in 1946, the Southern Counties League name could not be used because Ayr United 'A' and Kilmarnock 'A' were not members of the Southern Counties F.A.. Instead, the new competition was called the South of Scotland Football League. The first season saw the league played in two sections, East and West, but it has been played as a single league ever since.

Teams play each other on a home and away basis. In seasons where league membership has been low, clubs have played each other four times, instead of the usual twice. Recent changes in league membership have been:

- Stranraer Athletic withdrew from the league at the end of the 2007–08 season.
- The newly formed Gretna 2008, founded to replace the Gretna team that had been forced to dissolve following its meteoric rise to the Scottish Premier League between 2002 and 2007, applied to join the South of Scotland League, but then joined the East of Scotland Football League instead.
- Annan Athletic withdrew their reserve team from the league at the end of the 2008–09 season, so that they could concentrate on the SFL Under-19 League and the Reserve League West.
- Stranraer withdrew their reserve team from the league at the end of the 2011–12 season, before returning again in 2017.
- Dalbeattie Star and Threave Rovers withdrew from the league at the end of the 2012–13 season to join the newly formed Lowland Football League, although both have since been relegated back to the league. Threave subsequently transferred to the West of Scotland Football League for season 2022–23.
- After 44 Seasons in the Dumfries and District Amateur Football League, champions Lochar Thistle were elected to the league for the start of the 2013–14 season.
- Three new teams Dumfries YMCA, Edusport Academy and Upper Annandale were elected to the league for the 2014–15 Season.
- Fleet Star withdrew from the league in 2016. Crichton, who were saved from folding last season by a merger with Lochmaben Amateurs, have taken the Lochmaben name and moved to Lockerbie.
- Bonnyton Thistle joined the league in 2017 before moving to the newly formed West of Scotland Football League in 2020.
- In March 2026, the newly founded Carluke side in Saltire City announced that they would join the South of Scotland Football League for the 26-27 season.

== Member clubs ==
Location of teams in 2025–26 South of Scotland Football League within Dumfries & Galloway

Team	Location	Home ground	Surface	Capacity	Seats	Floodlit
Annan Athletic reserves	Annan	Galabank	Artificial	2,504	500	Yes
Abbey Vale	New Abbey	Maryfield Park	Grass	500	48	No
Creetown	Creetown	Castlecary Park	Grass	500	0	Yes
Gretna 2008 reserves	Gretna	Raydale Park	Artificial	1,030	138	Yes
Lochar Thistle	Dumfries	Wilson Park	Grass	1,000	0	Yes
Lochmaben	Lochmaben	Whitehills Park	Grass	1,000	0	No
Mid-Annandale	Lockerbie	New King Edward Park	Artificial	500	50	Yes
Nithsdale Wanderers	Sanquhar	Lorimer Park	Grass	1,000	0	Yes
St Cuthbert Wanderers	Kirkcudbright	St Mary's Park	Artificial	1,000	0	Yes
Saltire City	Carluke	John Cumming Stadium	Artificial	1,500	0	Yes
Stranraer reserves	Stranraer	Stair Park	Grass	4,178	1,830	Yes
Wigtown & Bladnoch	Wigtown	Trammondford Park	Grass	888	0	Yes

== League membership ==
Bold indicates a current league member.

Club	Years Active	Titles won
**Abbey Vale**	2001–	1
Annan Athletic	1977–1987	2
Annan Athletic Reserves	1987–1991, 1992–2009, 2017–2019,2026-	
Ayr United 'A'	1946–1948	2
Bonnyton Thistle	2017–2020	
Caledonian Braves Reserves	2019–2023	
**Creetown**	1946–1948, 1972–	
Crichton	1992–2016	1
Dalbeattie Star	1946–1947, 1976–2001, 2009–2012, 2023–2026	6
Dalbeattie Star Reserves	2001–2009	
Dumfries	2000–2008	
Dumfries High School Former Pupils	1994–2000	
Dumfries United	1987–1988	
Dumfries YMCA	2014–2019	
Edusport Academy	2014–2017	1
Fleet Star	2004–2016	
Girvan	1951–1962, 1975–2005	1
Glenluce	1948–1950	
Gretna Reserves	2001–2003	
Gretna Community	1991–1992	
Gretna 2008 Reserves	2026-	
Greystone Rovers	1956–1958	1
Heathhall Athletic	1948–1950	
Heston Rovers	2008–2021	
Kilmarnock 'A'	1946–1948	
Lincluden Swifts	1977–1980	1
**Lochar Thistle**	2013–	1
**Lochmaben**	2016–	
Maxwelltown High School Former Pupils	1990–2000	1
**Mid-Annandale**	2003–	
Newton Stewart	1946–2026	3
Nithsdale Wanderers (1)	1946–1947, 1948–1950	
**Nithsdale Wanderers (2)**	2001–	
Queen of the South Reserves	1972–1973, 1992–1993, 1996–1997, 2003–2004	1
RAF West Freugh	1948–1949	
Saltire City	2026-	
**St Cuthbert Wanderers**	1946–	8
Solway Star	1946–1947	
Stranraer	1946–1949	
**Stranraer Reserves**	1949–1988, 1990–1991, 2003–2004, 2007–2012, 2017–	16
Stranraer Athletic	1995–2008	3
Tarff Rovers	1946–1988, 1990–2003	8
Threave Rovers	1959–1998, 2004–2012, 2016–2022	13
Upper Annandale	2014–2025	
Whithorn	1946–1959, 1962–1963, 1964–69	
**Wigtown & Bladnoch**	1946–2017, 2018–	5

Notes:

1. Crichton was known as Blackwood Dynamos until 1999. The club was to be called Crichton Royal, but the suffix has never been used.
2. Dumfries was formed by the merger of Dumfries High School Former Pupils and Dumfries Amateurs.
3. Heston Rovers Youth (formed in 1978) merged with Dumfries in 2008, retaining Heston Rovers as the name of the new club.
4. Annan Athletic (1987–2008), Dalbeattie Star (2001–2009) and Threave Rovers (1998–2004) have all run teams in the East of Scotland League. From the 2008–09 season, Annan Athletic has played in the Scottish Football League. Dalbeattie Star and Threave Rovers joined the newly formed Scottish Lowland Football League for the 2013–14 season.
5. The following clubs have resigned during the season:
- Creetown 1975–76
- Girvan 1978–79
- Gretna Community 1991–92
- RAF West Freugh 1948–49
- St Cuthbert Wanderers 1977–78
- Wigtown & Bladnoch 1962–63 and 1972–73
- Dumfries United resigned prior to the start of the 1987–88 season.

== Cup competitions ==
In 1950, the league's membership had been reduced to just seven clubs. To compensate for the lack of fixtures, the League Cup was introduced. The final is usually contested by the winners of two mini-leagues, but has also been played as a straight knock-out competition. There was no separate League Cup competition between 1962–1968 and 1973–1975. Instead the trophy was awarded to the runner-up in the League.

The Southern Counties Cup, also known as the Challenge Cup, is the league's main knockout competition. It has been played for since 1891, and the first winners were the 5th Kirkcudbrightshire Rifle Volunteers.

Creetown, Dalbeattie Star, Newton Stewart, St Cuthbert Wanderers, and Wigtown & Bladnoch are full members of the Scottish Football Association therefore enter the Scottish Cup, as do the winners of the league.

=== Holders ===
2024–25 winners unless stated.

- SFA South Region Challenge Cup: East Kilbride
- Alba Cup: Lochar Thistle
- South & East of Scotland Cup-Winners Shield: Whitburn
- South of Scotland League Cup: Lochar Thistle
- Southern Counties FA Challenge Cup: Caledonian Braves
- J Haig Gordon Memorial Trophy: Edusport Academy (2018–19)
- SCFA Potts Cup: Stranraer
- WDFA Cree Lodge Cup: Lochar Thistle
- WDFA Tweedie Cup: No competition

== List of winners ==
Season	Original League	
1892–93	5th Kirkcudbrightshire Rifle Volunteers	
1893–94	No Competition	
1894–95	St Cuthbert Wanderers	
1895–96	St Cuthbert Wanderers (2)	
1896–97	6 GRV	
1897–98	Newton Stewart	
1898–99 to 1909–10	No Competition	
1910–11	Douglas Wanderers	
1911–12	No Competition	
1912–13	No Competition	
1913–14	Newton Stewart (2)	
1914–15	5th KOSB	
1915–16 to 1929–20	No Competition	
1920–21	St Cuthbert Wanderers	
1921–22	Mid-Annandale	
1923–23	Mid-Annandale (2)	
1923–24	Newton Stewart (3)	
1924–25	Dalbeattie Star	
1925–26	No Competition	
1926–27	No Competition	
1927–28	St Cuthbert Wanderers	
1928–29	St Cuthbert Wanderers	
1929–30	Dalbeattie Star	
1930–31	Dalbeattie Star	
1931–32	Dalbeattie Star	
1932–33	Dalbeattie Star	
1933–34	Dalbeattie Star	
1934–35	St Cuthbert Wanderers	
1935–36	St Cuthbert Wanderers	
1936–37	St Cuthbert Wanderers	
1937–38 to 1945–46	No league championship for the duration of the Second World War	
Season	Current league	
1946–47	Ayr United 'A'	
1947–48	Ayr United 'A'	
1948–49	Stranraer	
1949–50	Tarff Rovers	League Cup
1950–51	Newton Stewart (4)	Newton Stewart
1951–52	Wigtown & Bladnoch	Wigtown & Bladnoch
1952–53	Tarff Rovers (2)	Wigtown & Bladnoch (2)
1953–54	Wigtown & Bladnoch (2)	St Cuthbert Wanderers
1954–55	St Cuthbert Wanderers	Tarff Rovers
1955–56	Newton Stewart (5)	Tarff Rovers (2)
1956–57	St Cuthbert Wanderers	Stranraer Reserves
1957–58	Greystone Rovers	Stranraer Reserves
1958–59	St Cuthbert Wanderers	Newton Stewart
1959–60	Stranraer Reserves	Tarff Rovers (3)
1960–61	Stranraer Reserves	Tarff Rovers (4)
1961–62	Stranraer Reserves	Stranraer Reserves
1962–63	Tarff Rovers (3)	
1963–64	Tarff Rovers (4)	
1964–65	Threave Rovers	
1965–66	Stranraer Reserves	
1966–67	Stranraer Reserves	
1967–68	Stranraer Reserves	
1968–69	Threave Rovers (2)	Stranraer Reserves
1969–70	Stranraer Reserves	St Cuthbert Wanderers (2)
1970–71	St Cuthbert Wanderers	
1971–72	Threave Rovers (3)	Threave Rovers
1972–73	Stranraer Reserves	
1973–74	St Cuthbert Wanderers	
1974–75	Stranraer Reserves	
1975–76	Stranraer Reserves	Girvan
1976–77	Stranraer Reserves	Stranraer Reserves
1977–78	Stranraer Reserves	Girvan (2)
1978–79	Threave Rovers (4)	Lincluden Swifts
1979–80	Lincluden Swifts	Lincluden Swifts
1980–81	St Cuthbert Wanderers (14)	Threave Rovers
1981–82	Stranraer Reserves	St Cuthbert Wanderers (3)
1982–83	Stranraer Reserves	Annan Athletic
1983–84	Annan Athletic	Wigtown & Bladnoch (3)
1984–85	Dalbeattie Star	Annan Athletic
1985–86	Dalbeattie Star (2)	Newton Stewart
1986–87	Annan Athletic (2)	Wigtown & Bladnoch (4)
1987–88	Newton Stewart (6)	Threave Rovers
1988–89	Dalbeattie Star (3)	Dalbeattie Star
1989–90	Girvan	Threave Rovers
1990–91	Maxwelltown High School	Threave Rovers
1991–92	Wigtown & Bladnoch (3)	Girvan (3)
1992–93	Threave Rovers (5)	Dalbeattie Star
1993–94	Threave Rovers (6)	Threave Rovers
1994–95	Threave Rovers (7)	Wigtown & Bladnoch (5)
1995–96	St Cuthbert Wanderers (15)	St Cuthbert Wanderers (4)
1996–97	Queen of the South Reserves	Queen of the South Reserves
1997–98	Tarff Rovers (5)	Tarff Rovers
1998–99	Tarff Rovers (6)	Tarff Rovers
1999–00	Tarff Rovers (7)	Tarff Rovers
2000–01	No competition due to the 2001 foot-and-mouth outbreak	Newton Stewart
2001–02	Tarff Rovers (8)	Girvan (4)
2002–03	Stranraer Athletic	Crichton
2003–04	Stranraer Athletic (2)	Stranraer Athletic
2004–05	Stranraer Athletic (3)	Annan Athletic
2005–06	Threave Rovers (8)	Creetown
2006–07	Threave Rovers (9)	Threave Rovers
2007–08	Crichton	St Cuthbert Wanderers (5)
2008–09	Threave Rovers (10)	St Cuthbert Wanderers (6)
2009–10	Threave Rovers (11)	Stranraer Reserves
2010–11	Threave Rovers (12)	Dalbeattie Star
2011–12	Dalbeattie Star (4)	Dalbeattie Star
2012–13	Dalbeattie Star (5)	Dalbeattie Star
2013–14	Wigtown & Bladnoch (4)	Wigtown & Bladnoch (6)
2014–15	Wigtown & Bladnoch (5)	Edusport Academy
2015–16	St Cuthbert Wanderers (16)	Edusport Academy (2)
2016–17	Edusport Academy *	Newton Stewart
2017–18	Threave Rovers (13)	Abbey Vale
2018–19	Stranraer Reserves	Upper Annandale
2019–20	Null and void due to the COVID-19 pandemic	Stranraer Reserves
2020–21	Null and void due to the COVID-19 pandemic	
2021–22	St Cuthbert Wanderers (17)	Threave Rovers
2022–23	Abbey Vale	Creetown
2023–24	Dalbeattie Star (6)	Lochar Thistle
2024–25	Lochar Thistle	Lochar Thistle (2)
2025–26	Dalbeattie Star (7) *	Abbey Vale (2)

* Team promoted to the Lowland League

== Total titles won ==
Clubs currently playing in the league are shown in bold.

Rank	Club	Pre-war league	Current league	Total
1	**St Cuthbert Wanderers**	8	9	17
2	**Stranraer Reserves**	0	16	16
3=	**Threave Rovers**	0	13	13
3=	**Dalbeattie Star**	6	7	13
5	Tarff Rovers	0	8	8
6	**Newton Stewart**	3	3	6
7	**Wigtown & Bladnoch**	0	5	5
8=	Stranraer Athletic	0	3	3
8=	Annan Athletic	0	3	3
10=	Ayr United 'A'	0	2	2
10=	**Mid-Annandale**	2	0	2
12=	5th KRV	1	0	1
12=	5th KOSB	1	0	1
12=	6 GRV	1	0	1
12=	**Abbey Vale**	0	1	1
12=	Crichton	0	1	1
12=	Douglas Wanderers	1	0	1
12=	Edusport Academy	0	1	1
12=	Girvan	0	1	1
12=	Greystone Rovers	0	1	1
12=	Lincluden Swifts	0	1	1
12=	Lochar Thistle	0	1	1
12=	Maxwelltown High School	0	1	1
12=	Queen of the South Reserves	0	1	1
