= Jane Hannay =

Jane Hannay CBE
- Born: 8 February 1868
- Died: 4 April 1938
- Occupation: Teacher
- Known for: Women's employment rights activism

Jane Ewing Hannay CBE (8 February 1868 – 4 April 1938) was a women's welfare and employment activist and a teacher.

== Early life and education ==
Jane Wilson was born in New Abbey, Dumfries to the family of Rev. James Stewart Wilson and Jane Ewing Brown. She studied at St Leonards School in St Andrews, following which she went on to pursue her higher education at Girton College, Cambridge. After passing the Classical Tripos at Cambridge University in 1899, she returned to St Leonards School to teach Classics and German between 1890 and 1899. In 1899 she married Robert Kerr Hannay (1867–1940) and the two had a child in 1900.

== Activism ==
During the First World War, Jane Hannay was involved in organising voluntary women's patrols in Edinburgh and was an honorary secretary of a training school for policewomen and patrols in Glasgow.

== Memberships and awards ==
- The Edinburgh Local Employment Committee
- Ministry of Labour Committee
- Central Committee on Training and Employment of Women
- Awarded the CBE (1933)
