= Cronberry Eglinton F.C. =

Former association football club in Scotland

Cronberry Eglinton
- Full name: Cronberry Eglinton Football Club
- Founded: 1885
- Dissolved: 1932
- Ground: Derrens Holm (1885–1895); Mortonmuir Park (1895–1932)
- League: South of Scotland Football League (1892–1893); Cumnock and District Junior League (1907–1914); South Ayrshire Junior League (1921–1932)
Home colours

Cronberry Eglinton Football Club was a football team based in the now tiny hamlet of Cronberry in East Ayrshire, Scotland.

The club was originally formed as a junior side in 1885 but between the years of 1891 and 1895 Eglinton were registered as a senior club with the Scottish FA and permitted to enter the Scottish Cup. In 1892 they were founder members of the first but ill-fated South of Scotland Football League. They were also founder members of the Ayrshire Junior Football Association in 1889.

Eglinton had been preceded by an earlier club, Cronberry FC which was formed in 1880 but folded just two years later.

In the early years Cronberry played in navy & white striped shirts with navy shorts but after 1895, and to mark a return to junior status, changed to black & white.

The football club took its unusual suffix from the Eglinton Iron Company who developed the villages of Lugar and Cronberry in the 1840s to provide housing for workers at the nearby colliery and ironworks.

During the 1920s many of the pits in the East Ayrshire coalfield closed down and the men moved away in search of work. In 1928 the Eglinton Iron Company, by then owned by William Baird & Co, closed leaving the local economy decimated.

Cronberry Eglinton FC survived until the South Ayrshire Junior Football League collapsed in 1932.

== Honours ==
- South Ayrshire Junior Football League Champions, 1927–28

== Famous Players ==
Glenbuck-born Bill Shankly began his footballing career as a right-half for Cronberry Eglinton FC in 1931–32 season following of the demise of his home town side, the legendary Glenbuck Cherrypickers in 1930.
