= Maxwelltown High School =

- Crest of Maxwelltown High School

Location
- Lochside Road; Dumfries, DG2 0EL; 55.085°N 3.646°W

Information
- Type: Secondary School
- Motto: Cognoscam (Know)
- Established: 1971; 52 years ago
- Closed: 2018; 5 years ago
- Local authority: Dumfries and Galloway Council
- Gender: Mixed
- Colours: Black; Royal Blue

Maxwelltown High School was a state funded, six-year comprehensive secondary school in the Lochside area of Dumfries, Scotland. Founded in 1971, Maxwelltown High School was the most recently founded secondary school in Dumfries and Galloway, before merging with other schools into North West Community Campus. It had 311 pupils as of August 2012. The roll of Maxwelltown High School had been steadily declining since 2002.

Although attainment throughout the school was generally lower than the national averages for equivalent qualifications, this improved in later years and the school was known as being a leader in curriculum development.

== History ==
=== Beginnings ===
The school is the most recently founded High School operating in Dumfries and Galloway, opening in 1971 to subsidize the rapid expansion of Dumfries's population in the 1970s, particularly affordable council developments in the Lochside and Lincluden areas where the school is located. The school was designed by architect Alexander Abercrombie Wilkie who was at the time chief architect of Dumfries County Council Architect and Master of Works Department responsible for all council developments in the area known at the time as Dumfries County (later incorporated into Dumfries and Galloway), it was Wilkie's last major architectural design before his death in 1972.

The school is within the town border of Dumfries but it is not contained within the bounds of Dumfriesshire, it is instead in the historic burgh of Maxwelltown in neighbouring Kirkcudbrightshire from which the school inherits its name. In 1983, with the closing of Cargenbridge Secondary School, the school's catchment area grew to include Cargenbridge Primary School and Shawhead Primary School bringing the total number of catchment primary schools to 6 where it stands today.

=== Recent history ===
In recent years, the school has focused a lot of attention on social development and community integration particularly in the areas surrounding the school which have a reputation being socially problematic, having high rates of crime, antisocial behaviour, and problems with bullying inside the school. The school tries to support pupils coming from disadvantaged backgrounds and is highly regarded for its learning support department which provides additional support to pupils with special educational and behavioural needs.

=== Closure ===
In the summer of 2018, the school closed its doors with all staff and pupils being transferred to the newly built North West Community Campus. The site was left derelict and was later fully demolished in 2020.

== Notable former pupils ==
- Ted McMinn, association footballer
- Anne Neville, engineer
- Sheila Rowan, physicist and academic
