= North & South Lanarkshire Amateur Football Association =

- Founded: 2008
- Folded: 2017
- Country: Scotland
- Confederation: UEFA
- Divisions: Premier Division; Division One
- Number of clubs: 16
- Level on pyramid: N/A
- Promotion to: None
- Relegation to: None
- Domestic cup(s): Scottish Amateur Cup; West of Scotland Cup

The North & South Lanarkshire Amateur Football Association (NSLAFA) was a football (soccer) league competition for amateur clubs in the Lanarkshire region of Scotland. It was formed in 2008 but folded in 2017. The association is affiliated to the Scottish Amateur Football Association. As a stand-alone Association and not part of Scotland's pyramid system, the Premier Division did not act as a feeder league and there was no promotion available.

== League set-up ==
The North & South Lanarkshire AFA was split into two divisions, a Premier Division of 10 teams and a 12-strong Division One.

Level	League(s)/Division(s)
1	Premier Division; 10 clubs playing 18 games
2	Division One; 12 clubs playing 22 games

== Member clubs ==
The North & South Lanarkshire AFA is currently composed of 22 member clubs, listed below in their respective divisions :

=== Premier Division ===
- Blantyre Soccer Academy
- Carluke Hearts
- Blantyre RGM
- Holytown Colts
- Motherwell Bridgeworks
- North Motherwell
- Mill United
- Eddlewood
- Springhill
- Woodhall Thistle

=== Division One ===
- Bothwell United
- Chapelhall
- Dal Riata
- East Kilbride
- The Georgian
- Central Park

== Cup Competitions ==
As well as the league, the association administers three cup competitions for teams in membership: The John Roan Cup, Paterson's Trophy and the Lanarkshire Cup.
