= Fleet Star F.C. =

Former association football club in Scotland

Fleet Star
- Full name: Fleet Star Football Club
- Nickname(s): Fleet
- Founded: 1948
- Dissolved: 2014
- Ground: Garries Park
Home colours

Fleet Star F.C. was an association football club from Gatehouse of Fleet in Scotland.

== History ==
The club was founded in 1948 and the name chosen as an adaptation of the names of two previous clubs in the town, Fleetside Rovers and White Star.

Fleet Star played at an amateur level until 2004, when it switched to the South of Scotland League. The club struggled at this level, finishing bottom of the table 4 times in 12 seasons (including losing every match in 2005–06), and its best finish was 8th out of 14 in 2014–15.

The club withdrew from the competition in 2016, unable to find a new manager, and there is no record of it playing again.

== Colours ==
The club's colours were originally blue and white hoops, borrowed from Gatehouse School for the first season. In its final seasons the club wore all blue.

== Ground ==
The club played at Garries Park.
