= Dumfries YMCA F.C. =

Dumfries YMCA
- Full name: Dumfries YMCA Football Club
- Nickname: The Y
- Founded: 1976
- Ground: Dumfries High School 3G, Dumfries
- Capacity: 500
- Chairman: Wattie Dyer
- Manager: Greg Wallace and Steven Little
- 2019–20: South of Scotland League (folded)
- Website: http://www.clubwebsite.co.uk/ymca/151952/Home
Home colours	Away colours

Dumfries YMCA Football Club are a football club from the town of Dumfries in Scotland. They originally competed in the Dumfries & District Amateur Football League (DDAFL) prior to its disbanding before switching to the South of Scotland Football League for the 2014–15 season. Home matches are played at Dumfries High School in Dumfries.

== History ==
Dumfries YMCA FC started off in the early 1970s, playing in the youth leagues in their local area of Dumfries and Galloway. It was not until 1976 that the decision was made for the club to enter a team in to the DDAFL's League Division 2. Within a few seasons, in 1981, the club achieved promotion to League Division 1, the top flight of the DDAFL, and remained there until the league disbanded in 2013.

After that promotion in 1981, the club went on to win six League Division 1 titles within a ten-year period, the first of which came in 1984 and the last of which came in 1993. Those six titles rank as fourth in the all-time list of DDAFL League Division 1 winners. The club have also finished as league runners-up a total of seven times to date.

After the DDAFL disbanded, the club entered their team in the South of Scotland Football League, where they continue to compete. They have yet to hit the heights of the team of the 1980s, failing to win a competition since the 2011–12 season.

Dumfries YMCA withdrew from the South of Scotland League midway through the 2019–20 season.

== Home ground and club colours ==
The club's official home ground is MacLeod Pavilion at Kingholm Quay but they play all home matches on a 4G surface at the nearby Dumfries High School.

The club's home kits are all-red with white trim and their away kits are all-blue with white trim.

== Current squad ==
As of 22 October 2018

Note: Flags indicate national team as defined under FIFA eligibility rules; some limited exceptions apply. Players may hold more than one non-FIFA nationality.

No.	Pos.	Nation	Player
—	GK	SCO	Murray Coulthard
—	GK	SCO	Ross Bell
—	GK	SCO	Blair Crossan
—	DF	SCO	Chris Cannon
—	DF	SCO	Ross McCole
—	DF	SCO	Craig Peat
—	DF	SCO	Connor Love
—	DF	SCO	William Black
—	DF	SCO	Arron Jackson
—	DF	SCO	Corie Davies
—	MF	SCO	Duncan Wright
—	MF	SCO	Owen Welsh
—	MF	SCO	Mikey Boyd
—	MF	SCO	Corey Brown
—	MF	SCO	Scott Gordon

No.	Pos.	Nation	Player
—	MF	SCO	Tom Wright
—	MF	SCO	Andy McNay
—	MF	SCO	Aaron Jardine (captain)
—	MF	SCO	Chris Faulds
—	MF	SCO	Nathan Curtis
—	MF	SCO	Jamie Goodwin
—	MF	SCO	Kevan McCall
—	MF	SCO	Ben Wallace
—	MF	SCO	Hamish Bremner
—	MF	SCO	Patrick Callaghan
—	FW	SCO	Connor Bryan
—	FW	SCO	Liam Robertson
—	FW	SCO	Ben Louden
—	FW	SCO	Drew Bryan
—	FW	SCO	Robbie McIlwraith
—	FW	SCO	Michael Maggiori

== Non-playing staff ==
As of 1 October 2018

Position	Name
Chairman	Walter Dyer
Secretary	Alexander Dingwall
Treasurer	Blair Crossan
Co-manager	Greg Wallace
Co-manager	Steven Little
Assistant manager	Connor McGeorge
Goalkeeper coach	Ross Johnston
First aid/physio	Garth McIlorum

== Honours ==
League Division 1

Winners - 1983–84, 1984–85, 1985–86, 1987–88, 1991–92, 1992–93

Runners-up - 1987–88, 1990–91, 1998–99, 1999–2000, 2000–01, 2002–03, 2004–05

League Division 2

Winners - 1980–81

Queen of the South Cup

Winners - 1985–86, 1986–87, 1995–96

British Legion Cup

Winners - 1985–86, 1987–88, 1990–91, 1993–94, 2011–12

Runners-up - 1986–87, 1988–89, 1996–97

SOVRO Cup

Winners - 1985–86

Burns Cup

Winners - 1997–98

Runners-up - 1996–97, 2001–02

Tayleurian Cup

Winners - 1998–99

Runners-up - 1993–94, 1994–95, 1996–97

Skol Cup

Runners-up - 1983–84

Nivison Cup

Winners - 1986–87, 1991–92, 1994–95

McCall Cup

Runners-up - 2006–07

Octocentinery Cup

Winners - 1985–86

South of Scotland Cup

Runners-up - 1983–84
