= New Abbey =

Coordinates: 54.979888°N 3.619428°W

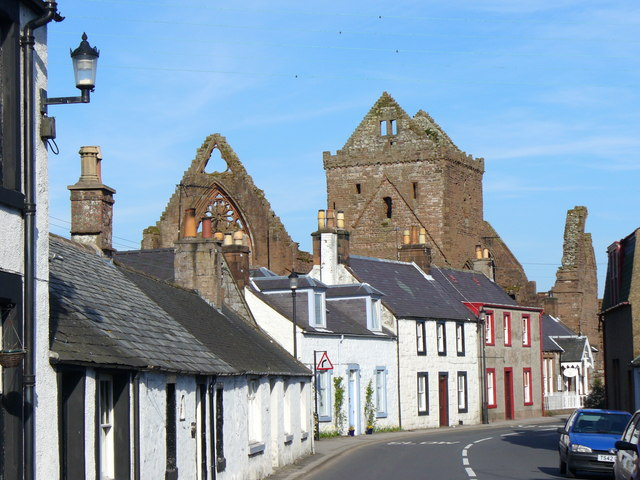
- Village Street, New Abbey

- Location within Dumfries and Galloway
- Population: 82 (2001 Census)
- Council area: Dumfries and Galloway
- Lieutenancy area: Dumfries
- Country: Scotland
- Sovereign state: United Kingdom
- Post town: Dumfries
- Postcode district: DG2
- Dialling code: 01387
- Police: Scotland
- Fire: Scottish
- Ambulance: Scottish
- UK Parliament: Dumfries and Galloway
- Scottish Parliament: Dumfriesshire

New Abbey is a village in the historical county of Kirkcudbrightshire in Dumfries and Galloway, Scotland. It is 6 miles (10 km) south of Dumfries. The summit of the prominent hill Criffel is 2.5 miles (4.0 km) to the south.

== History ==
The village has a wealth of history including the ruined Cistercian abbey Sweetheart Abbey, founded by Lady Dervorguilla in 1273 in memory of her husband John Balliol. She kept his embalmed heart close to her for the rest of her life. The monks named the abbey dulce cor ("sweet heart"). The building afterwards became known as the New Abbey, to distinguish it from the older foundation at Dundrennan, which had been erected in 1142 by Fergus of Galloway.

The village has a watermill, the New Abbey Corn Mill. Loch Kindar has a crannog and the village has the remains of Kirk Kindar (this was the parish church until just after 1633 when it was transferred to the refectory of the suppressed Sweetheart Abbey) on an island located just outside the village.

New Abbey was one of five parishes from Kirkcudbrightshire included in the Nithsdale district of Dumfries and Galloway under the local government reforms of 1975 which abolished Kirkcudbrightshire as an administrative county. The parish has therefore been included in the Dumfries lieutenancy area since 1975.

== Description ==
The village has a saw mill, a hotel, a village shop, a coffee shop, a primary school, a doctor's surgery, a village hall, a bowling green, a football pitch – Maryfield Park (home to Abbey Vale FC) – and a Church of Scotland church. A Roman Catholic church, St Mary's, designed by the New Abbey born architect Walter Newall, closed in 2013. It is now The Thomas Bagnall Centre with occasional retreats and Mass said here.

Two burns flow through the village: the New Abbey Pow which runs into the River Nith Estuary and the Sheep Burn.

== Notable people ==
- Francis Campbell Boileau Cadell, (1883–1937), Scottish colourist artist, friend of the Stewart family and frequent visitor to their home Shambellie House.
- Jane Hannay, activist and teacher
- James MacKenzie, recipient of the Victoria Cross for bravery
- Sir William Patterson, founder of the Bank of England, was buried in the village in 1719.
- Dougie Sharpe, Scottish League internationalist footballer and long time servant to Queen of the South from the club's days in Scotland's top division.

== See also ==
- List of listed buildings in New Abbey, Dumfries and Galloway
