= Upper Annandale F.C. =

Association football club in Scotland

Upper Annandale
- Full name: Upper Annandale Football Club
- Nickname: Uppers
- Founded: 1966
- Ground: Moffat Academy, Moffat
- Capacity: 1,000
- Manager: Bellamy Anderson
- 2024–25: South of Scotland League, 8th of 12
Home colours	Away colours

Upper Annandale Football Club are a football club from the town of Moffat in the Dumfries and Galloway area of Scotland. The club was founded in 1966 and had played in the South of Scotland Football League.

They originally competed in the Dumfries & District Amateur Football League, but switched to the senior leagues in time for the 2014–15 season. Home matches are played at New King Edward Park in Lockerbie due to ground restrictions in Moffat. New King Edward Park can accommodate approximately 1,000 spectators. The club are managed by Bryan Gilfillan.

Uppers won the Dumfries & District AFL Division One title a total of five times, including four successive title between 2007 and 2010. Since their move to the South of Scotland League, their best league finish has been 5th position in 2018–19. At the end of the 2024–25 season, they announced that they had resigned from the South of Scotland Football League due to issues with their ground setup in Moffat.

Upper Annandale now play in the Dumfries Sunday Amateur Football League.

== Honours ==
- Dumfries & District AFL Division One
  - Winners (5): 1970–71, 2006–07, 2007–08, 2008–09, 2009–10
