= Heston Rovers F.C. =

Heston Rovers
- Nickname: The Zodiac Lunches
- Founded: 1978
- Ground: Palmerston Park, Dumfries
- Capacity: 8,690 (3,377 seated)
- Chairman: Alan A Watson
- Manager: Michael Houston
- 2020–21: South of Scotland League (season abandoned)
Home colours	Away colours

Heston Rovers Football Club are a Scottish amateur (previously senior) football club who play their home games at Maryfield, Dumfries, having played at Palmerston Park, which they shared with Queen of the South when a member of the South of Scotland Football League. They now play in the Dumfries Sunday Amateur League and D&G Youth Football Development Association league.

Although Heston Rovers F.C. were founded in 1978, as a youth club, the senior club played from 2008 to 2021 following an amalgamation with Glencaple-based Dumfries F.C., who were already members of the South of Scotland Football League but struggling. Dumfries F.C. was the result of an earlier merger in 2000, when Dumfries High School Former Pupils F.C. combined with Dumfries Amateurs F.C.

== History ==
The Dumfries HSFP Football Club were formed in 1968, and played in the Dumfries and District Amateur League. In 1994, the club were elected to the South of Scotland Football League, playing home matches at the Sir David Keswick Centre in Dumfries. The need for an enclosed venue led to them relocating four miles south to Glencaple the following year. In the late 1970s, the Former Pupils signed Ted McMinn who would go on to play for Queen of the South and Rangers, amongst others.

Dumfries Amateurs F.C. also started out in the Dumfries and District Amateur League as St Joseph's College Former Pupils F.C., before changing their name to Dumfries Amateurs in 1995. During their time in the Amateur League, the team won many cups and won the league title in the 1999–00 season, just prior to amalgamation. The club were also based in Glencaple, playing at Norfolk Park. Following the merger in 2000, Dumfries F.C. continued to play at Norfolk Park during their eight-year existence. They were members of the South of Scotland Football League throughout this time.

The original Heston Rovers club were formed in 1978 in the Lochside area of Dumfries. Members of the Scottish Youth Football Association, they re-located a number of times before they settled at Maryfield in the Georgetown district of Dumfries for the 1995–96 season, fielding teams for children aged 5–16, but Chairman Scott McGill was keen to add an adult team to the club set-up as an outlet for their youth players to continue in the game.

Following the 2008 merger, the new club retained the Heston Rovers name and their black and white colours, which have historical significance in the area being the colours of the first Dumfries F.C., formed in 1897. First team matches were played at Norfolk Park with Maryfield being used as a regular training venue. The club was accepted into membership of the Southern Counties Football Association and inherited the Dumfries F.C. South of Scotland Football League membership.

New (but temporary) changing facilities at Maryfield were opened in May 2008, by former Scotland manager Craig Brown, bringing the ground up to South of Scotland Football League standards. The adult team moved to Maryfield in August 2010.

Rovers reached the final of the 2010–11 Tweedie Cup but lost 3–6 to Stranraer. Heston became a registered Scottish Charity in November 2011, the first club in the region to make this move. They were also the first non professional club in Dumfries and Galloway to receive the Scottish FA's Quality Mark award in October 2008, which was upgraded in December 2012 to 'community club' level at an awards ceremony at Hampden Park.

Long serving chairman, Scott McGill retired in May 2013, after eleven successful years as chair, and was replaced by Alan Watson. In the same year, the club left their Maryfield ground to share Palmerston Park with Queen of the South. In season 2013–14 the senior team won their first silverware in the South League when they won the Potts Cup and the Cree Lodge Cup.
