= Abbey Vale F.C. =

Association football club in Scotland

Abbey Vale
- Full name: Abbey Vale Football Club
- Nickname: The Vale
- Founded: 1971 as Lochvale
- Ground: Maryfield Park, New Abbey, Scotland
- Capacity: 1,000
- Coordinates: 54°58′44″N 3°36′54″W
- Chairman: Andrew Brolls
- Manager: Alan Clarke
- League: South of Scotland League
- 2025–26: South of Scotland League, 6th of 11
Home colours

Abbey Vale Football Club are a football club based in the village of New Abbey in the historical county of Kirkcudbrightshire in the Dumfries and Galloway area of Scotland. They started life as an amateur side called Lochvale F.C. in 1971, but as more players joined from the village, the committee decided to change their name and move to New Abbey in 1974. However, to maintain their place in the Dumfries Amateur League, the new side had to maintain the "Vale" in their title, hence the new club became known as Abbey Vale F.C.

In 2001, the club took a step up in competition and joined the South of Scotland Football League. Their highest league position for a time was third, achieved in the 2005–06 and 2021–22 seasons. They would win the league in the 2022–23 season, qualifying for the Scottish Cup for the first time in their history. They took on Scottish Amateur Cup champions Cupar Hearts at Maryfield Park in the 2023–24 Scottish Cup in August 2023.

The club's home strip is a yellow and black hooped shirt with black shorts. Their current manager is Alan Clarke, long term servant of the club, assisted by Curtiss Wilson who is player/coach.

== Honours ==
- South of Scotland Football League: 2022–23
- Alba Cup: 2022–23
- South of Scotland League Cup: 2017–18
- Tweedie Cup: 2005–06, 2014–15
