= Devlin MacKay =

Scottish footballer

Personal information
- Full name: Devlin MacKay
- Date of birth: 23 January 1997 (age 29)
- Height: 1.91 m (6 ft 3 in)
- Position: Goalkeeper

Youth career
- –2015: Kilmarnock

Senior career*
| Years | Team | Apps | (Gls) |
| 2015–2020 | Kilmarnock | 1 | (0) |
| 2015 | → Derby County (loan) | 0 | (0) |
| 2017 | → Berwick Rangers (loan) | 4 | (0) |

International career^{‡}
| 2013–2014 | Scotland U17 | 1 | (0) |
Medal record
Scotland
UEFA European U-17 Championship
| Bronze medal – third place | 2014 Malta | Team competition |
- * Club domestic league appearances and goals as of 16:54, 2 August 2020 (UTC) ‡ National team caps and goals as of 16:54, 2 August 2020 (UTC)

Devlin MacKay (born 23 January 1997) is a Scottish professional footballer who plays as a goalkeeper. MacKay is a graduate of Kilmarnock's youth academy and has previously played for Derby County and Berwick Rangers.

== Club career ==
MacKay began his career in Kilmarnock's youth academy. In 2015, after impressing in a trial match against Burnley, MacKay signed on loan for Derby County where he competed in the club's successful U21 Premier League Division 2 squad.

January 2017 saw MacKay join Berwick Rangers on loan when the League Two club's first-choice keeper Kevin Walker was forced out with a shoulder injury. The then 20-year-old played in his first senior competitive match in a 4–1 win over Annan Athletic on 4 February and went on to make four appearances for Berwick in the league before returning to Rugby Park.

MacKay made his only appearance for Kilmarnock against Rangers on 19 May 2019 when he came off the bench for the injured Jamie MacDonald. He kept a clean sheet as Kilmarnock won 2–1 to qualify for the 2019–20 UEFA Europa League. He signed a new one-year deal with Kilmarnock a month later but was released at the end of the 2019–20 season.

== International career ==
MacKay received his first call-up to the Scotland national under-17 football team in September 2013 for the UEFA European Under-17 Championship qualifying round in Slovenia. He made his debut for the team in the elite round in a 1–0 win against Romania at Rugby Park on 29 March as Scotland qualified for the final tournament in Malta. MacKay travelled with the team for the tournament in May 2014 but he didn't make another appearance.

In November 2015, MacKay was called up for the only time to the Scotland national under-19 football team but didn't make an appearance in their 2016 UEFA European Under-19 Championship qualification group.

== Career statistics ==
As of match played 2 August 2020

Appearances and goals by club, season and competition
| Club | Season | League | | | Scottish Cup | | League Cup | | Other | | Total | |
| Club | Season | Division | Apps | Goals | Apps | Goals | Apps | Goals | Apps | Goals | Apps | Goals |
|---|---|---|---|---|---|---|---|---|---|---|---|---|
| Kilmarnock | 2016–17 | Premiership | 0 | 0 | 0 | 0 | 0 | 0 | 0 | 0 | 0 | 0 |
| Kilmarnock | 2017–18 | Premiership | 0 | 0 | 0 | 0 | 0 | 0 | 0 | 0 | 0 | 0 |
| Kilmarnock | 2018–19 | Premiership | 1 | 0 | 0 | 0 | 0 | 0 | 0 | 0 | 1 | 0 |
| Kilmarnock | 2019–20 | Premiership | 0 | 0 | 0 | 0 | 0 | 0 | 0 | 0 | 0 | 0 |
| Kilmarnock | Total | | 1 | 0 | 0 | 0 | 0 | 0 | 0 | 0 | 1 | 0 |
| Berwick Rangers (loan) | 2016–17 | League Two | 4 | 0 | 0 | 0 | 0 | 0 | 0 | 0 | 4 | 0 |
| Career total | | | 5 | 0 | 0 | 0 | 0 | 0 | 0 | 0 | 5 | 0 |
