= 2018–19 Kilmarnock F.C. season =

Kilmarnock
2018–19 season
- Chairman: Billy Bowie
- Manager: Steve Clarke
- Stadium: Rugby Park
- Premiership: 3rd
- Scottish Cup: Fifth round
- League Cup: Second round
- Top goalscorer: League: Eamonn Brophy (11); All: Eamonn Brophy (12)
- Highest home attendance: 12,374 (vs Rangers, 23 January 2019)
- Lowest home attendance: 2,835 (vs Queen's Park, 5 December 2018)
- Average home league attendance: 6,894 ( 1,504)
Home colours	Away colours

The 2018–19 season was Kilmarnock's sixth season in the Premiership, and their 26th consecutive season in the top flight of Scottish football.

== Overview ==
Killie, like the previous season, went on a pre-season training camp in La Manga, Spain. On 13 July 2018, manager Steve Clarke said that Youssouf Mulumbu had left Kilmarnock and wasn't expected to return to the club. A Kilmarnock XI took part in two friendly matches. The first was against East Kilbride on 18 July 2018 in which Daniel Higgins scored the only goal of the game to give Killie a 1–0 win. On 22 July 2018, Killie played local junior side Kilwinning Rangers in Ben Lewis's testimonial.

Kilmarnock finished the season in third place - the club's highest league finish since 1966 - and with a record points tally. Eamonn Brophy's 89th-minute penalty secured a 2–1 win over Rangers in the last game of the season to secure third and qualification to the 2019–20 UEFA Europa League.

Kilmarnock were seeded for the group stage draw of the League Cup and were drawn to face Premiership rivals St Mirren along with Dumbarton, Queen's Park and Spartans. In their opening fixture, Kilmarnock drew 0–0 with St Mirren and missed out on the opportunity for a bonus point as they lost 3–2 on penalties. They won their subsequent three matches to finish first in Group H. Killie were eliminated in the second round by Rangers.

Kilmarnock entered the fourth round of the Scottish Cup as one of the Premiership clubs, starting on 19 January 2019. After defeating Forfar Athletic, they lost to Rangers in a fifth round replay.

== Results ==
=== Pre-season and friendlies ===
Date	Opponents	Venue	Result F–A	Scorers
18 July 2018	East Kilbride	K-Park Training Academy	1–0	Higgins 86'
22 July 2018	Kilwinning Rangers	Abbey Park	3–1	

=== Premiership ===
Date	Opponents	H / A	Result F–A	Scorers	Attendance	League position
4 August 2018	St Johnstone	H	2–0	S. Boyd 58', Ndjoli 85'	4,644	4th
11 August 2018	Livingston	A	0–0		2,586	4th
25 August 2018	Heart of Midlothian	H	0–1		6,239	6th
1 September 2018	Aberdeen	A	2–0	Brophy 44', Stewart 69'	14,248	3rd
15 September 2018	Hibernian	A	2–3	Brophy 26', Stewart 44'	17,622	7th
23 September 2018	Celtic	H	2–1	Burke 64', Findlay 90+3'	10,988	5th
29 September 2018	Motherwell	H	3–1	Burke 39', Stewart 44', Brophy 59' (pen.)	5,090	3rd
6 October 2018	Dundee	A	2–1	Boyle 17' (o.g.), Brophy 54' (pen.)	5,158	3rd
20 October 2018	St Mirren	A	2–1	Power 56', Tshibola 68'	5,889	3rd
27 October 2018	Hamilton Academical	H	1–1	McKenzie 44'	5,023	2nd
31 October 2018	Rangers	A	1–1	Stewart 15'	49,279	3rd
4 November 2018	Aberdeen	H	1–2	K. Boyd 32'	5,270	4th
10 November 2018	Heart of Midlothian	A	1–0	Millen 73'	17,417	4th
24 November 2018	St Johnstone	A	0–0		3,559	4th
1 December 2018	Hibernian	H	3–0	Brophy 6', 34' (pen.), Stewart 90'	6,036	2nd
5 December 2018	Livingston	H	2–0	Stewart 3', 20'	4,143	1st
8 December 2018	Celtic	A	1–5	Brophy 52' (pen.)	58,457	3rd
15 December 2018	Dundee	H	3–1	Broadfoot 54', Kusunga 66' (o.g.), Stewart 79'	4,668	1st
22 December 2018	Hamilton Academical	A	1–1	Brophy 7'	3,401	4th
26 December 2018	Motherwell	A	1–0	Jones 40'	5,426	3rd
29 December 2018	St Mirren	H	2–1	Findlay 4', Jones 11'	7,131	3rd
23 January 2019	Rangers	H	2–1	Brophy 22', Jones 66'	12,374	2nd
26 January 2019	Aberdeen	A	0–0		15,560	2nd
1 February 2019	Heart of Midlothian	H	1–2	Jones 45+1'	5,552	3rd
6 February 2019	Dundee	A	2–2	McAleny 18', Burke 54'	4,694	4th
17 February 2019	Celtic	H	0–1		11,916	4th
23 February 2019	Livingston	A	0–1		2,569	4th
27 February 2019	Motherwell	H	0–0	Abandoned		
2 March 2019	Motherwell	H	0–0		6,215	4th
11 March 2019	St Mirren	A	1–0	Millar 87'	4,458	4th
16 March 2019	Rangers	A	1–1	McAleny 29'	49,527	4th
30 March 2019	Hamilton Academical	H	5–0	Taylor 5', McAleny 56', Mulumbu 63', Burke 84', Ndjoli 90+2'	4,762	3rd
3 April 2019	Hibernian	A	0–0		16,588	3rd
6 April 2019	St Johnstone	H	2–0	Kane 17' (o.g.), K. Boyd 43' (pen.)	4,685	3rd
20 April 2019	Aberdeen	H	0–1		6,531	4th
27 April 2019	Celtic	A	0–1		58,851	4th
4 May 2019	Heart of Midlothian	A	1–0	Findlay 86'	17,103	3rd
11 May 2019	Hibernian	H	1–0	Brophy 32' (pen.)	7,484	3rd
19 May 2019	Rangers	H	2–1	Burke 9', Brophy 89' (pen.)	12,248	3rd

=== Scottish Cup ===
Date	Round	Opponents	H / A	Result F–A	Scorers	Attendance
19 January 2019	Fourth round	Forfar Athletic	H	2–0	Findlay 19', Burke 78'	4,376
9 February 2019	Fifth round	Rangers	H	0–0		11,430
20 February 2019	Fifth round replay	Rangers	A	0–5		37,918

=== League Cup ===
Date	Round	Opponents	H / A	Result F–A	Scorers	Attendance
13 July 2018	Group stage	St Mirren	H	0–0 (2–3p)		4,026
21 July 2018	Group stage	Dumbarton	A	4–2	Ndjoli 48', K. Boyd 68', 76', 90'	1,353
24 July 2018	Group stage	Spartans	A	3–0	Erwin 63', Ndjoli 80', 90'	1,078
28 July 2018	Group stage	Queen's Park	H	2–0	Brophy 62', K. Boyd 90+3'	2,835
19 August 2018	Second round	Rangers	H	1–3	Barišić 51' (o.g.)	12,016

== Squad statistics ==
No.	Pos.	Name	League		Scottish Cup		League Cup		Total		Discipline	
No.	Pos.	Name	Apps	Goals	Apps	Goals	Apps	Goals	Apps	Goals	Yellow card	Red card
1	GK	(Scotland) Jamie MacDonald	13	0	2	0	4	0	19	0	0	0
2	DF	(Scotland) Stephen O'Donnell	37	0	2	0	4	0	43	0	7	0
3	DF	(Scotland) Greg Taylor	36	1	2	0	3	0	41	1	4	0
4	MF	(Republic of Ireland) Jack Byrne	5	0	0	0	0	0	5	0	1	0
4	DF	(Northern Ireland) Alex Bruce	4	0	1	0	0	0	5	0	0	0
5	DF	(Scotland) Kirk Broadfoot	27	1	1	0	5	0	33	1	5	2
6	MF	(Republic of Ireland) Alan Power	36	1	3	0	5	0	44	1	12	0
7	MF	(Scotland) Rory McKenzie	24	1	2	0	2	0	28	1	2	1
8	MF	(Republic of Ireland) Gary Dicker	35	0	3	0	4	0	42	0	8	1
9	FW	(Scotland) Kris Boyd (c)	19	2	2	0	4	4	25	6	3	1
10	FW	(Scotland) Greg Kiltie	3	0	1	0	2	0	6	0	0	0
11	MF	(Northern Ireland) Jordan Jones	28	4	2	0	5	0	35	4	1	0
12	FW	(England) Mikael Ndjoli	24	2	2	0	5	3	31	4	3	0
13	GK	(Scotland) Devlin MacKay	1	0	0	0	0	0	1	0	0	0
15	FW	(Nigeria) Bright Enobakhare	6	0	0	0	0	0	6	0	1	0
15	FW	(England) Conor McAleny	11	3	2	0	0	0	13	3	1	0
16	DF	(Scotland) Scott Boyd	17	1	3	0	4	0	24	1	3	0
17	DF	(Scotland) Stuart Findlay	31	3	1	1	2	0	34	4	4	1
18	DF	(Scotland) Calum Waters	2	0	1	0	2	0	5	0	1	0
19	FW	(Scotland) Lee Erwin	1	0	0	0	4	1	5	1	0	0
19	FW	(Scotland) Greg Stewart	16	8	0	0	0	0	16	8	3	0
19	FW	(Canada) Liam Millar	13	1	1	0	0	0	14	1	0	0
20	MF	(Scotland) Iain Wilson	6	0	1	0	2	0	9	0	0	0
21	MF	(Scotland) Adam Frizzell	0	0	0	0	0	0	0	0	0	0
22	DF	(Scotland) Ross Millen	4	1	0	0	2	0	6	1	1	0
23	DF	(Scotland) Dom Thomas	1	0	0	0	2	0	3	0	0	0
24	MF	(Democratic Republic of the Congo) Youssouf Mulumbu	10	1	2	0	0	0	12	1	3	0
25	FW	(Scotland) Eamonn Brophy	29	11	1	0	3	1	33	12	3	0
26	GK	(Austria) Daniel Bachmann	25	0	2	0	1	0	28	0	1	1
27	MF	(Democratic Republic of the Congo) Aaron Tshibola	27	1	2	0	0	0	29	1	10	0
29	MF	(Scotland) Chris Burke	35	5	3	1	4	0	42	6	1	0

== Club statistics ==
=== Competition overview ===
Competition	First match	Last match	Starting round	Final position	Record							
Competition	First match	Last match	Starting round	Final position	Pld	W	D	L	GF	GA	GD	Win %
Premiership	4 August 2018	19 May 2019	Matchday 1	Matchday 38	38	19	10	9	50	31	+19	50.00
Scottish Cup	19 January 2019	20 February 2019	Fourth round	Fifth round replay	3	1	1	1	2	5	−3	33.33
League Cup	13 July 2018	19 August 2018	Group stage	Second round	5	3	1	1	10	5	+5	60.00
Total					46	23	12	11	62	41	+21	50.00

Source: Competitions

=== League table ===
Pos	Team	Pld	W	D	L	GF	GA	GD	Pts	Qualification or relegation (Note: Teams play each other three times (33 matches), before the league is split into two groups (the top six and the bottom six).)
1	Celtic (C)	38	27	6	5	77	20	+57	87	Qualification for the Champions League first qualifying round
2	Rangers	38	23	9	6	82	27	+55	78	Qualification for the Europa League first qualifying round (Note: Since the winners of the 2018–19 Scottish Cup, Celtic, qualified for European competition based on league position, the spot awarded to the Scottish Cup winners (Europa League first qualifying round) was passed to the fourth-placed team.)
3	Kilmarnock	38	19	10	9	50	31	+19	67	Qualification for the Europa League first qualifying round
4	Aberdeen	38	20	7	11	57	44	+13	67	Qualification for the Europa League first qualifying round
5	Hibernian	38	14	12	12	51	39	+12	54	

Source: Soccerway BBC
Rules for classification: 1) Points; 2) Goal difference; 3) Goals scored; 4) Play-off (only if deciding champion, UEFA competitions qualification and second stage group allocation).
(C) Champions

=== League cup table ===
Pos	Team	Pld	W	PW	PL	L	GF	GA	GD	Pts	Qualification
1	Kilmarnock (Q)	4	3	0	1	0	9	2	+7	10	Qualification for the Second round
2	St Mirren (Q)	4	1	3	0	0	8	2	+6	9	Qualification for the Second round
3	Dumbarton	4	1	1	0	2	3	10	−7	5	
4	Queen's Park	4	1	0	1	2	2	4	−2	4	
5	Spartans	4	0	0	2	2	3	7	−4	2	

Rules for classification: 1) goal difference, 2) goals scored, 3) away goals scored, 4) matches won, 5) away matches won, 6) drawing of lots.
(Q) Qualified to the phase indicated

== Player transfers ==
=== Transfers in ===
Date	Position	Name	Previous club	Fee	Ref.
4 July 2018	FW	(England) Mikael Ndjoli	(England) Bournemouth	Loan	
13 July 2018	DF	Ross Millen	Queen’s Park	Free	
8 August 2018	GK	(Austria) Daniel Bachmann	(England) Watford	Loan	
28 August 2018	FW	Greg Stewart	(England) Birmingham City	Loan	
29 August 2018	MF	(Democratic Republic of the Congo) Aaron Tshibola	(England) Aston Villa	Loan	
31 August 2018	FW	(Nigeria) Bright Enobakhare	(England) Wolverhampton Wanderers	Loan	
31 August 2018	MF	(Republic of Ireland) Jack Byrne	(England) Oldham Athletic	Free	
28 January 2019	FW	(England) Conor McAleny	(England) Fleetwood Town	Loan	
30 January 2019	DF	(Northern Ireland) Alex Bruce	(England) Wigan Athletic	Free	
31 January 2019	MF	(Democratic Republic of the Congo) Youssouf Mulumbu	Celtic	Loan	
31 January 2019	FW	(Canada) Liam Millar	(England) Liverpool	Loan	

=== Transfers out ===
Date	Position	Name	Subsequent Club	Fee	Ref
30 June 2018	MF	(Democratic Republic of the Congo) Youssouf Mulumbu	Celtic	Free	
11 June 2018	GK	(Italy) Leo Fasan	Falkirk	Free	
13 August 2018	FW	Lee Erwin	(Iran) Tractor	Free	
14 August 2018	FW	(Iran) Alex Samizadeh	(England) Curzon Ashton	Free	
30 August 2018	MF	(England) Brad Spencer	Dumbarton	Free	
31 August 2018	MF	Adam Frizzell	Queen of the South	Loan	
14 September 2018	MF	Daniel Higgins	Stranraer	Loan	
14 September 2018	MF	Innes Cameron	Stranraer	Loan	
7 December 2018	MF	(Republic of Ireland) Jack Byrne	(Republic of Ireland) Shamrock Rovers	Free	
29 January 2019	MF	Iain Wilson	Queen of the South	Loan	
30 January 2019	MF	Greg Kiltie	Greenock Morton	Loan	
31 January 2019	MF	Dominic Thomas	Dumbarton	Loan	
