= Joshua Webb =

Joshua or Josh Webb may refer to:

- Josh Webb (Home and Away), a recurring character in Home and Away
- Josh Webb (footballer) (born 1995), English footballer (Kilmarnock FC)
- Joshua Webb (basketball), Filipino basketball player (2013 PBA draft)
