= Steven Smith (footballer, born 1985) =

Scottish footballer

Personal information
- Full name: Steven Smith
- Date of birth: 30 August 1985 (age 41)
- Place of birth: Bellshill, Scotland
- Position: Left-back

Senior career*
Years	Team	Apps	(Gls)
2002–2010	Rangers	56	(1)
2010–2011	Norwich City	7	(0)
2011	→ Aberdeen (loan)	16	(0)
2011–2012	Preston North End	13	(0)
2012	Portland Timbers	21	(0)
2013–2015	Rangers	26	(2)
2015–2018	Kilmarnock	51	(3)

International career
2004–2006	Scotland U21	2	(0)
2006	Scotland B	1	(0)

Managerial career
- 2025: Rangers (interim)
- * Club domestic league appearances and goals as of 23:59, 10 January 2018 (UTC)

Steven Smith (born 30 August 1985) is a Scottish former footballer who was most recently the interim manager of Scottish Premiership club Rangers.

A left-back, Smith made an early breakthrough with Scottish side Rangers, and was capped by Scotland B in 2006, aged 21. A series of injuries hampered his career with club and country, before he moved to England with Norwich City, aged 24, on a Bosman transfer. During his time there he had a loan spell at Aberdeen and then joined Preston North End. He then moved to Portland Timbers and in 2013 returned to Rangers where he spent two years, before moving to Kilmarnock.

== Club career ==
=== Rangers ===
Born in Bellshill, Smith signed a professional contract with Rangers on 1 June 2002. He made his Rangers debut against Heart of Midlothian on 28 November 2004 as a half-time substitute for Maurice Ross. He played a further three times that season but had to wait until the winter of 2005 to establish himself in the team. He made twenty top team appearances that season including his UEFA Champions League debut against Villarreal CF on 22 February 2006. He signed a two-year contract extension less than a week later, on 27 February 2006. Smith went on to win the Scottish Premier League young player of the month for April 2006 which cemented his place as first choice left-back at the club.

The then new manager Paul Le Guen kept faith in Smith and despite Rangers' poor results and performances, he started the 2006–07 season in impressive form. This was rewarded with a further contract extension which he signed on 27 October 2006. Smith scored his first goal for the club in a 2–0 win over Dunfermline Athletic on 11 November 2006 during a game where he was named the Man of the Match.

During the winter of 2006, Smith was troubled by a recurring pelvic injury which would eventually sideline him for over a year. His last match before being injured was an Old Firm match on 17 December. Almost a year later, 20 November 2007, it was reported that Smith was finally on the injury comeback and after a successful hernia operation, he was soon to be fit again. He returned to the first team, appearing as an unused substitute in a Scottish Cup match against Partick Thistle in March 2008, over fifteen months after his last appearance and he made his first start back in the replay of that match the following month.

Smith suffered further injuries in the summer of 2008 and he was ruled out of action until the November 2008. After recovering, he found it difficult to make inroads into the first team. He joined Cardiff City on trial on 25 March 2009, returning to Rangers without having played a first-team game. When injuries and suspensions meant seven first team players were ruled out of the Rangers team, Smith was given his first start in over a year on 11 April 2009, in a league match against Motherwell. He played 73 minutes in the unfamiliar position of left midfield but did well enough to keep his place for following matches.

In season 2009–10 Smith won his first trophy as a player when Rangers defeated St Mirren in the Scottish League Cup Final.

=== Norwich City ===
On 2 June 2010, Smith signed for Norwich City on a Bosman transfer and was handed number 26. However, an achilles injury picked up in pre season has prevented Smith making his Norwich City debut. He made his return to training during the September international break. He made his first appearance in the squad for the fixture against Hull on 25 September, as an unused substitute. Smith made his Norwich City debut in the 4–3 victory over Leicester City, as a second half sub for the two goal hero Wes Hoolahan on 28 September. He made his first start in the 3–0 away victory over Bristol City due to the injury to Adam Drury in the warm up on 2 October 2010. Smith is expected to be given an extended run in the team due to Adam Drury's groin injury. Unfortunately, Smith picked up a hip injury in the 2–2 draw against Burnley, and was sidelined beyond the new year. Norwich boss Paul Lambert announced that Smith was looking to leave Norwich as he was finding it hard to settle in the area, and wanted to move back up to Scotland.

=== Aberdeen ===
On 31 January 2011, Smith signed for Aberdeen on loan for the remainder of the 2010–11 season.

=== Preston North End ===
On 12 August 2011, Smith joined Preston North End on a free transfer. He signed a one-year deal with the club, including an option of a further year. However, after an unsuccessful spell, Smith had his contracted mutually terminated on 10 April 2012, just two months before his original deal was due to expire.

=== Portland Timbers ===
On 25 April 2012, Smith joined Major League Soccer club Portland Timbers. Smith made his debut three days later on 28 April 2012 in the Timbers 2–0 defeat to the Montreal Impact.

Smith announced on his Twitter page that he wouldn't be returning to Portland for the 2013 MLS season. The club confirmed this on 6 December 2012.

=== Return to Rangers ===
Following his release from Portland Timbers, Smith was linked with a return move to St Mirren and Kilmarnock, however after training with Rangers a move was agreed on 1 June 2013. The move was confirmed by the club when he signed a two-year contract and was registered to play for Rangers on 1 September 2013. On 3 May Rangers players made history by becoming the first Rangers side in 115 years to go an entire league season unbeaten after a 1–1 draw with Dunfermline during which they clinched the Scottish League One championship. Smith made his 100th appearance for Rangers (over both spells) in November 2014 in a 1–1 draw at Ibrox against Alloa Athletic. In his 101st appearance against Hearts he got sent off in the 21st-minute leading to a 2–0 loss.

=== Kilmarnock ===
On 2 July 2015, Smith signed for Kilmarnock, having been released by Rangers. At the start of the 2016–17 season, Smith was given the captaincy of Kilmarnock. Smith was released by Kilmarnock in May 2018, at the end of his contract.

== International career ==
Smith played twice for the Scotland under-21 football team. He was due to be selected for the Scotland squad for 2008 UEFA European Football Championship qualifying matches against France and Ukraine in October 2006, but a thigh injury prevented this. He also played for the Scotland B team in their 0–0 draw with the Republic of Ireland B team on 14 November 2006, at the Dalymount Park, Dublin.

== Coaching career ==
Since 2021, Smith has been a youth coach at Rangers.

On 1 October 2023, after the dismissal of Rangers first team manager Michael Beale, Smith assisted interim manager Steven Davis with coaching duties.

Following the sacking of Russell Martin, on 16 October 2025, Smith was announced as interim manager. He took charge of one match, a 2-2 draw to Dundee United, prior to the appointment of Danny Röhl.

== Career statistics ==
As of 24 May 2018

Club	Season	League			Cup		League Cup		Other		Total	
Club	Season	Division	Apps	Goals	Apps	Goals	Apps	Goals	Apps	Goals	Apps	Goals
Rangers	2004–05	Scottish Premier League	4	0	0	0	0	0	0	0	4	0
Rangers	2005–06	Scottish Premier League	18	0	0	0	1	0	1	0	20	0
Rangers	2006–07	Scottish Premier League	17	1	0	0	2	0	5	0	24	1
Rangers	2007–08	Scottish Premier League	0	0	2	0	0	0	0	0	2	0
Rangers	2008–09	Scottish Premier League	5	0	1	0	0	0	0	0	6	0
Rangers	2009–10	Scottish Premier League	12	0	2	0	3	0	1	0	18	0
Rangers	Total		56	1	5	0	6	0	7	0	74	1
Norwich City	2010–11	EFL Championship	7	0	0	0	0	0	–		7	0
Aberdeen (loan)	2010–11	Scottish Premier League	16	0	4	0	0	0	–		20	0
Preston North End	2011–12	EFL League One	13	0	0	0	1	0	1	0	15	0
Portland Timbers	2012	Major League Soccer	21	0	1	0	–		–		22	0
Rangers	2013–14	Scottish League One	13	2	1	1	0	0	2	0	16	3
Rangers	2014–15	Scottish Championship	13	0	1	0	3	0	3	1	20	1
Rangers	Total		26	2	2	1	3	0	5	1	36	4
Kilmarnock	2015–16	Scottish Premiership	22	2	3	0	2	0	0	0	27	2
Kilmarnock	2016–17	Scottish Premiership	26	1	1	0	3	0	–		30	1
Kilmarnock	2017–18	Scottish Premiership	3	0	0	0	0	0	1	0	3	0
Kilmarnock	Total		51	3	4	0	5	0	1	0	61	3
Career total			190	6	16	1	15	0	14	1	235	8

=== Managerial record ===
As of 18 October 2025

Managerial record by team and tenure
Team	Nat	From	To	Record				
Team	Nat	From	To	G	W	D	L	Win %
Rangers (interim)	(Scotland)	16 October 2025	20 October 2025	1	0	1	0	0.00
Career Total				1	0	1	0	0.00

== Honours ==
=== Club ===
Rangers

- Scottish Premier League: 2004–05, 2008–09, 2009–10
- Scottish League One: 2013–14
- Scottish League Cup: 2009–10
