= Dean Hawkshaw =

Scottish footballer

Personal information
- Date of birth: 24 April 1997 (age 29)
- Place of birth: Kilmarnock, Scotland
- Position: Left midfielder

Youth career
- 2008-2017: Kilmarnock

Senior career*
Years	Team	Apps	(Gls)
2015–2018	Kilmarnock	76	(5)
2018.	Stranraer (loan)	12	(1)
2018–2019	Glenafton Athletic	32	(2)
2019–2021	Airdrieonians	15	(0)
2021–2025	Stranraer	79	(4)
2025-	Hurlford United	14	(1)
- * Club domestic league appearances and goals as of 01:59, 31 May 2025 (UTC)

Dean Hawkshaw (born 24 April 1997) is a Scottish footballer who plays as a midfielder for Hurlford United in the West of Scotland Premier Division. Hawkshaw has previously played for Kilmarnock, Glenafton Athletic, Airdrieonians and Stranraer.

== Career ==
Hawkshaw made his league debut for Kilmarnock in August 2016 against Motherwell, being taken off after a clash of heads with Carl McHugh. McHugh was out of play for several months with a head injury, while Hawkshaw had a concussion. Hawkshaw was out for months with a later knee injury. He remained in and around the first-team under the management of both Lee Clark and Lee McCulloch, but dropped out of the squad under Steve Clarke. Hawkshaw was loaned to Stranraer in January 2018, and released by Kilmarnock at the end of the 2017–18 season.

Hawkshaw made a trial appearance for Greenock Morton in a friendly against Forfar Athletic in July 2018. He signed for Junior side Glenafton Athletic in September 2018.

Hawkshaw then moved to Scottish League One club Airdrieonians, and made his first league appearance for the club in a 1–0 win against Forfar on 23 March 2019. In May 2019, he signed a new contract with the club. Hawkshaw returned to Stranraer in July 2021. Hawkshaw departed Stranraer in 2025.

== Career statistics ==
As of match played 07 August 2021

Appearances and goals by club, season and competition
Club	Season	League			Scottish Cup		League Cup		Other		Total	
Club	Season	Division	Apps	Goals	Apps	Goals	Apps	Goals	Apps	Goals	Apps	Goals
Kilmarnock	2015–16	Scottish Premiership	0	0	0	0	1	0	0	0	1	0
Kilmarnock	2016–17	Scottish Premiership	15	0	0	0	0	0	1 (Note: Appearance for Kilmarnock under-20s in the Scottish Challenge Cup in which age-restricted sides from the Scottish Premiership clubs compete against senior clubs)	1	16	1
Kilmarnock	2017–18	Scottish Premiership	5	0	0	0	0	0	0	0	5	0
Kilmarnock	Total		20	0	0	0	1	0	1	0	22	1
Stranraer (loan)	2017–18	Scottish League One	12	0	0	0	0	0	0	0	12	0
Airdrieonians	2018–19	Scottish League One	6	0	0	0	0	0	0	0	6	0
Airdrieonians	2019–20	Scottish League One	9	0	1	0	2	0	3 (Note: Appearances in the Scottish Challenge Cup)	0	15	0
Airdrieonians	2020–21	Scottish League One	0	0	0	0	0	0	0	0	0	0
Airdrieonians	Total		15	0	1	0	2	0	3	0	21	0
Stranraer	2021–22	Scottish League Two	2	0	0	0	3	0	0	0	5	0
Career total			49	0	1	0	6	0	4	1	60	1
