= Alan Power =

Irish footballer (born 1988)

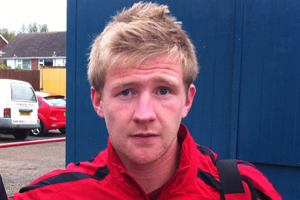
- Power in 2011

Personal information
- Full name: Alan Thomas Daniel Power
- Date of birth: 23 January 1988 (age 38)
- Place of birth: Drimnagh, Dublin, Ireland
- Position: Midfielder

Team information
- Current team: Lincoln United

Youth career
- Belvedere
- Nottingham Forest

Senior career*
Years	Team	Apps	(Gls)
2006–2008	Nottingham Forest	0	(0)
2007–2008	→ Grays Athletic (loan)	5	(1)
2008–2010	Hartlepool United	6	(0)
2010–2011	Rushden & Diamonds	41	(3)
2011–2017	Lincoln City	222	(27)
2017–2021	Kilmarnock	118	(2)
2021–2022	St Mirren	34	(0)
2022–2023	Kilmarnock	35	(0)
2023–2024	Greenock Morton	33	(0)
2025–	Lincoln United	0	(0)

International career
2004–2005	Republic of Ireland U17	4	(0)
2006	Republic of Ireland U18	2	(0)
2006–2007	Republic of Ireland U19	9	(0)
2007	Republic of Ireland U21	1	(0)
- * Club domestic league appearances and goals as of 09:43, 22 November 2025 (UTC)

Alan Thomas Daniel Power (born 23 January 1988) is an Irish footballer who plays as a midfielder for Northern Premier League Division One East club Lincoln United. He has previously played for Grays Athletic, Hartlepool United, Rushden & Diamonds, Lincoln City, St Mirren, Kilmarnock and Greenock Morton.

== Club career ==
Born in Dublin, Power started his career with Nottingham Forest. Manager Colin Calderwood's named him as a substitute in several first team matches towards the end of the 2006–07 season. Power made his first full start against Peterborough United in the Football League Trophy on 4 September 2007.

Power signed for Grays Athletic on a three-month loan deal on 22 November 2007, he returned to Forest having played in five Conference National games and three FA Trophy games, scoring once. He was recalled by Forest in February 2008.

In June 2008, Power signed for League One outfit Hartlepool United and he made his league debut coming on as a substitute in the home defeat to Stockport County on 23 August 2008.

In June 2010 it was announced he would join Rushden & Diamonds on 1 July 2010 following the expiry of his Hartlepool contract. He was released by Rushden in May 2011.

=== Lincoln City ===
On 6 July 2011, Power signed a one-year contract with Lincoln City. On 24 May 2013, Power signed a new two-year contract with the club. Power was also named as club captain. On 21 May 2015 he agreed a new two-year contract at Lincoln City keeping him at Sincil Bank until the 2016–17 season.

His final year at the Imps was highly successful, with the team winning the National League to return to the Football League after six years, as well as the Quarter Finals of the FA Cup, in which he scored the equalising goal against runaway Championship Leaders Brighton and Hove Albion in the fourth round. He also helped the team reach the semi finals of the FA Trophy.

Power left the Imps at the end of his contract.

=== Kilmarnock ===
On 24 June 2017, Power signed for Kilmarnock on a two-year contract.

=== St Mirren ===
On 21 June 2021, Power signed for St Mirren.

=== Kilmarnock (2nd stint) ===
In May 2022, Power returned to a newly promoted Kilmarnock side on a season-long deal.

=== Greenock Morton ===
On 4 August 2023, Power signed for Scottish Championship side Greenock Morton on a one-year deal, shortly following his Kilmarnock exit.

=== Lincoln United ===
In November 2025, Power returned to playing, joining Northern Premier League Division One East club Lincoln United.

== International career ==
He has represented the Republic of Ireland at youth international level and was called into the Irish Under-21 squad in October 2007.

== Career statistics ==
As of match played 1 May 2021

Appearances and goals by club, season and competition
Club	Season	League			National Cup		League Cup		Other		Total	
Club	Season	Division	Apps	Goals	Apps	Goals	Apps	Goals	Apps	Goals	Apps	Goals
Nottingham Forest	2007–08	League One	0	0	0	0	0	0	1 (Note: Appearance in the Football League Trophy)	0	1	0
Grays Athletic (loan)	2007–08	Conference Premier	5	1	0	0	—		0	0	5	1
Hartlepool United	2008–09	League One	4	0	0	0	0	0	0	0	4	0
Hartlepool United	2009–10	League One	2	0	0	0	0	0	0	0	2	0
Hartlepool United	Total		6	0	0	0	0	0	0	0	6	0
Rushden & Diamonds	2010–11	Conference Premier	41	3	2	0	—		2 (Note: Appearances in the FA Trophy)	0	45	3
Lincoln City	2011–12	Conference Premier	42	4	2	0	—		3	0	47	4
Lincoln City	2012–13	Conference Premier	37	8	5	3	—		1	1	43	12
Lincoln City	2013–14	Conference Premier	38	3	4	0	—		1	3	43	6
Lincoln City	2014–15	Conference Premier	37	7	3	0	—		1	0	41	7
Lincoln City	2015–16	Conference Premier	38	3	3	0	—		1	0	42	3
Lincoln City	2016–17	Conference Premier	30	2	9	2	—		6	0	45	4
Lincoln City	Total		222	27	26	5	0	0	13	4	261	36
Kilmarnock	2017–18	Scottish Premiership	24	0	3	0	4	0	—		31	0
Kilmarnock	2018–19	Scottish Premiership	36	1	3	0	5	0	—		44	1
Kilmarnock	2019–20	Scottish Premiership	28	0	3	0	2	0	2 (Note: Appearances in the UEFA Europa League)	0	35	0
Kilmarnock	2020–21	Scottish Premiership	30	1	3	0	1	0	—		34	1
Kilmarnock	Total		118	2	12	0	12	0	2	0	144	2
Career total			392	33	40	5	12	0	18	4	462	42
