= Gary Dicker =

Irish footballer (born 1986)

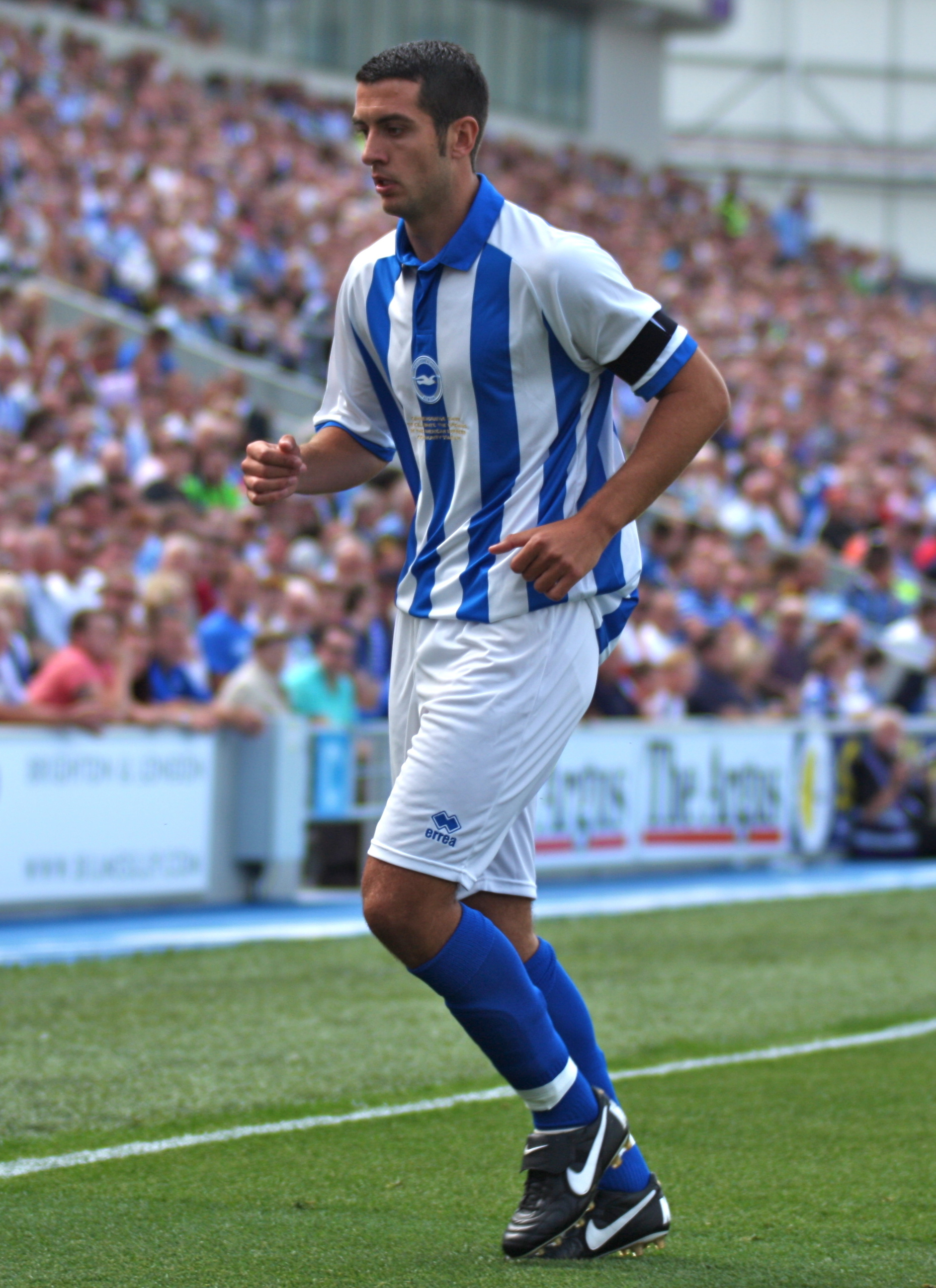
- Dicker playing for Brighton & Hove Albion in 2011

Personal information
- Full name: Gary Dicker
- Date of birth: 31 July 1986 (age 40)
- Place of birth: Dublin, Ireland
- Height: 1.83 m (6 ft 0 in)
- Position: Midfielder

Team information
- Current team: Charlotte FC (assistant coach)

Youth career
- Cherry Orchard

Senior career*
Years	Team	Apps	(Gls)
2004–2007	UCD	69	(5)
2007	→ Birmingham City (loan)	0	(0)
2007–2009	Stockport County	55	(0)
2009	→ Brighton & Hove Albion (loan)	9	(1)
2009–2013	Brighton & Hove Albion	129	(5)
2013–2014	Rochdale	12	(1)
2014	Crawley Town	11	(0)
2014–2016	Carlisle United	39	(1)
2016–2021	Kilmarnock	158	(3)
2021–2022	Brighton & Hove Albion	0	(0)
Total		482	(16)

International career
2005	Republic of Ireland U19	2	(0)
2006	Republic of Ireland U21	4	(1)

Managerial career
- 2024–2025: Crown Legacy
- * Club domestic league appearances and goals

Gary Dicker (born 31 July 1986) is an Irish football coach and former professional player who is the assistant coach for Major League Soccer club Charlotte FC.

He started his career with League of Ireland club UCD and went on to make more than 200 appearances in the English Football League, most notably with Brighton & Hove Albion, then spending almost five and a half years with Scottish Premiership side Kilmarnock before semi-retiring in 2021 when he returned to Brighton and became a player-coach for Brighton & Hove Albion U23s. Dicker played for his country of Ireland at under-19 and under-21 level. After retiring as a player, he joined the coaching staff at Brighton, and since September 2022 has been assistant head coach of the club's U21 team.

== Club career ==
=== UCD ===
Born in Dublin, Dicker began his career at League of Ireland side UCD. He joined from his local junior club Cherry Orchard and was gradually introduced into the first team through substitute appearances towards the latter end of UCD's successful 2004 First Division campaign. Dicker progressed his way into a regular starting position the following season and successfully partnered Tony McDonnell in central midfield for the 2005 and 2006 Premier Division seasons. During his time at UCD he earned underage honours for Ireland at under-19 and under-21 level.

In the 2006 League of Ireland close season he spent a loan spell at Championship side Birmingham City, but he never made it past the reserve team. He made his debut for the Birmingham City reserves against Stoke City Reserves, which Birmingham won 3–0. The Birmingham reserve team coach, Keith Bertschin, described Dicker as a "very decent player. He's a good technical player, who can see and put in some lovely weighted passes and is decent with both feet".

=== Stockport County ===
Dicker was signed by manager Jim Gannon for Stockport County on 29 May 2007, for a fee of just £40,000, signing a contract until 1 July 2010. He played a regular part in Stockport's 2007–08 League Two campaign and took part in a promotion for the second time in his career as County successfully negotiated their way into League One via the playoffs. Dicker was a fan favourite during his time at Stockport for his passing ability and off the ball work rate. Dicker scored his only goal for Stockport in November 2008, opening the scoring in a 5–0 win in an FA Cup first-round tie at home to Yeovil Town.

=== Brighton & Hove Albion ===
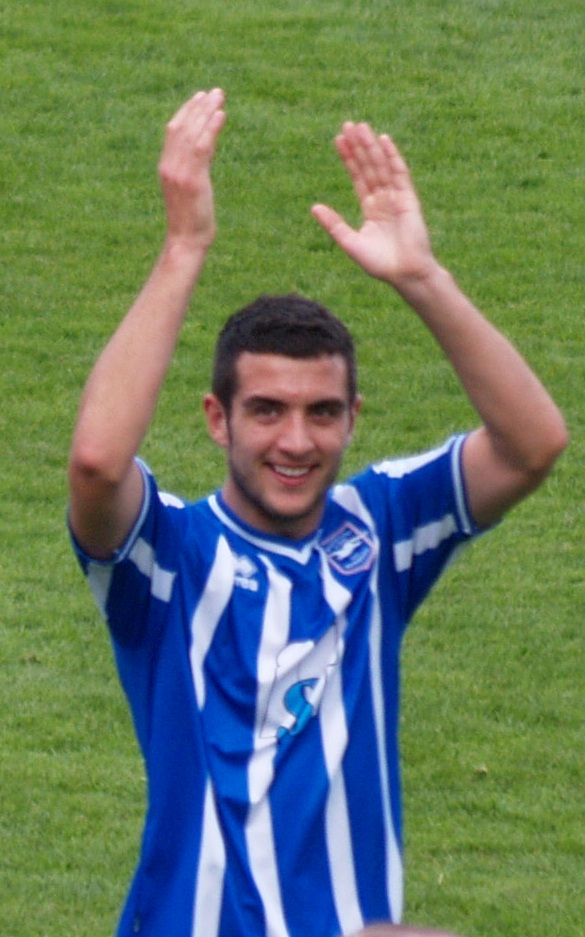
Dicker playing for Brighton & Hove Albion in 2011

On 26 March 2009, Dicker joined League One side Brighton & Hove Albion on loan for the remainder of the season. He made nine appearances for the Seagulls, scoring one goal, during this spell. On 25 June, he joined Brighton on a free transfer, signing a two-year contract. On 28 April 2011, having helped Brighton secure promotion to the Championship, Dicker was rewarded with a two-year contract extension. He was released when that contract expired at the end of the 2012–13 season.

=== Rochdale ===
On 13 September 2013, Dicker joined Rochdale on an initial five-month deal.

=== Crawley Town (loan) ===
On 23 January 2014, Dicker joined Crawley Town for the remainder of the 2013–14 season.

=== Carlisle United ===
On 27 June 2014, Dicker signed a two-year deal with League Two side Carlisle United.

=== Kilmarnock ===
On 1 February 2016, Dicker moved to Scottish Premiership club Kilmarnock, signing an eighteen-month contract. He made his debut in a Scottish Cup tie away to Rangers five days later. In early February 2021, Dicker was asked to help take temporary charge of the Kilmarnock first team alongside James Fowler and Andy Millen following the departure of Alex Dyer. He left Kilmarnock at the end of the 2020–21 season.

=== Return to Brighton ===
Dicker returned to Brighton & Hove Albion on 2 July 2021, signing a deal to become a coach for the U23s whilst being eligible to play as one of three over-age outfield players in the Premier League 2. He made his first appearance since signing on 14 September, starting in the away trip at Walsall in the group stage of the EFL Trophy. He was shown a straight red card for a dangerous challenge on Emmanuel Osadebe in the 1–0 loss. On 25 January 2022, Dicker announced his retirement from playing professional football.

== Coaching career ==
On 31 January 2022, six days after he announced his retirement from playing, Dicker became a coach for Brighton & Hove Albion U18s, working alongside James Baxter. In September 2022, he became assistant to Albion U21s head coach Shannon Ruth.

On 14 November 2024, Dicker was appointed as head coach for Crown Legacy FC in MLS Next Pro.

== Career statistics ==
Appearances and goals by club, season and competition
Club	Season	League			National Cup		League Cup		Other		Total	
Club	Season	Division	Apps	Goals	Apps	Goals	Apps	Goals	Apps	Goals	Apps	Goals
UCD	2004	LOI First Division	9	1	4	0	0	0	—		13	1
UCD	2005	LOI Premier Division	31	2	4	0	4	0	—		39	2
UCD	2006	LOI Premier Division	29	2	3	0	0	0	—		32	2
UCD	Total		69	5	11	0	4	0	—		84	5
Birmingham City (loan)	2006–07	Championship	0	0	0	0	—		—		0	0
Stockport County	2007–08	League Two	30	0	0	0	2	0	4 (Note: One appearances in Football League Trophy, three in League Two play-offs)	0	36	0
Stockport County	2008–09	League One	25	0	4	1	1	0	2 (Note: Appearances in Football League Trophy)	0	32	1
Stockport County	Total		55	0	4	1	3	0	6	0	68	1
Brighton & Hove Albion (loan)	2008–09	League One	9	1	—		—		—		9	1
Brighton & Hove Albion	2009–10	League One	42	2	5	0	0	0	0	0	47	2
Brighton & Hove Albion	2010–11	League One	46	3	4	0	1	0	1	0	52	3
Brighton & Hove Albion	2011–12	Championship	18	0	0	0	1	0	—		19	0
Brighton & Hove Albion	2012–13	Championship	23	0	2	0	1	0	—		26	0
Brighton & Hove Albion	Total		138	6	11	0	3	0	1	0	153	6
Rochdale	2013–14	League Two	12	1	1	0	—		2	0	15	1
Crawley Town	2013–14	League One	11	0	—		—		—		11	0
Carlisle United	2014–15	League Two	20	1	1	0	0	0	2	0	23	1
Carlisle United	2015–16	League Two	19	0	4	0	3	0	1	0	27	0
Carlisle United	Total		39	1	5	0	3	0	3	0	50	1
Kilmarnock	2015–16	Scottish Premiership	12	0	2	0	0	0	2 (Note: Appearances in Premiership play-offs)	0	16	0
Kilmarnock	2016–17	Scottish Premiership	36	1	1	0	4	0	—		41	1
Kilmarnock	2017–18	Scottish Premiership	21	0	4	0	0	0	—		25	0
Kilmarnock	2018–19	Scottish Premiership	35	0	3	0	4	0	—		42	0
Kilmarnock	2019–20	Scottish Premiership	30	2	3	0	2	0	2 (Note: Appearances in UEFA Europa League)	0	37	2
Kilmarnock	2020–21	Scottish Premiership	24	0	2	0	1	0	—		27	0
Kilmarnock	Total		158	3	15	0	11	0	4	0	188	3
Brighton & Hove Albion U23	2021–22	—			—		—		1	0	1	0
Career total			482	16	47	1	24	0	17	0	570	17

== Honours ==
Stockport County

- Football League Two play-offs: 2008

Brighton & Hove Albion

- Football League One: 2010–11
