= Daniel Higgins =

Scottish footballer

Personal information
- Date of birth: 8 April 1998 (age 28)
- Place of birth: Glasgow, Scotland
- Height: 1.83 m (6 ft 0 in)
- Position: Defender

Team information
- Current team: Cumnock Juniors

Youth career
- 2011–2017: Celtic

Senior career*
Years	Team	Apps	(Gls)
2017	Dundee	4	(0)
2017–2019	Kilmarnock	1	(0)
2018	→ Airdrieonians (loan)	8	(2)
2018–2019	→ Stranraer (loan)	11	(0)
2019–2021	Cove Rangers	5	(1)
2021–2022	East Fife	19	(0)
2022–2023	Stenhousemuir	20	(0)
2023–2024	Broomhill	8	(1)
2024–	Cumnock Juniors		
- * Club domestic league appearances and goals as of 20 April 2024

Daniel Higgins (born 8 April 1998) is a Scottish footballer who plays for Lowland League West club Cumnock Juniors. Higgins has previously played for Dundee, Kilmarnock, Airdrieonians, Stranraer, Cove Rangers, East Fife , Stenhousemuir and Broomhill.

== Playing career ==
Higgins made his professional debut for Dundee on 8 April 2017, in a 1–0 defeat away to Heart of Midlothian

Higgins signed for Kilmarnock on 23 June 2017. He was loaned to League One club Airdrieonians on 31 January 2018.

In September 2018, he joined Stranraer on loan.

On 16 July 2019, Higgins signed for newly promoted Scottish League Two club Cove Rangers.

Higgins moved to East Fife in August 2021 for the season then when the club got relegated to league 2 he left the club for Stenhousemuir. After a year with the larbert outfits he left the club for newly reformed Broomhill in June 2023.

== Career statistics ==
As of match played 7 September 2019

Appearances and goals by club, season and competition
Club	Season	League			Scottish Cup		League Cup		Other		Total	
Club	Season	Division	Apps	Goals	Apps	Goals	Apps	Goals	Apps	Goals	Apps	Goals
Dundee	2016–17	Scottish Premiership	4	0	0	0	0	0	–		4	0
Kilmarnock	2017–18	Scottish Premiership	0	0	0	0	1	0	1 (Note: Appearances for Kilmarnock under-20s/21s in the Scottish Challenge Cup in which age-restricted sides from the Scottish Premiership clubs compete against senior clubs)	0	2	0
Kilmarnock	2018–19	Scottish Premiership	0	0	0	0	0	0	1	0	1	0
Kilmarnock	Total		0	0	0	0	1	0	2	0	3	0
Airdrieonians (loan)	2017–18	Scottish League One	8	2	0	0	0	0	0	0	8	2
Stranraer (loan)	2018–19	Scottish League One	11	0	0	0	0	0	0	0	11	0
Cove Rangers	2019–20	Scottish League Two	5	1	0	0	3	0	2 (Note: Appearances in the Scottish Challenge Cup)	0	10	1
Career total			28	3	0	0	4	0	4	0	36	3
