= Stuart Findlay =

Scottish footballer (born 1995)

Personal information
- Full name: Stuart John Findlay
- Date of birth: 14 September 1995 (age 31)
- Place of birth: Baillieston, Glasgow, Scotland
- Height: 6 ft 3 in (1.91 m)
- Position: Centre-back

Team information
- Current team: Heart of Midlothian
- Number: 17

Youth career
- 2009–2013: Celtic

Senior career*
Years	Team	Apps	(Gls)
2013–2016	Celtic	0	(0)
2014	→ Greenock Morton (loan)	14	(0)
2015	→ Dumbarton (loan)	15	(0)
2015–2016	→ Kilmarnock (loan)	22	(0)
2016–2018	Newcastle United	0	(0)
2017–2018	→ Kilmarnock (loan)	32	(3)
2018–2021	Kilmarnock	71	(4)
2021–2022	Philadelphia Union	12	(0)
2022	Philadelphia Union II	2	(0)
2022–2026	Oxford United	39	(0)
2023–2025	→ Kilmarnock (loan)	50	(0)
2025–2026	→ Heart of Midlothian (loan)	34	(6)
2026–	Heart of Midlothian	9	(1)

International career
2010–2011	Scotland U16	2	(0)
2011–2012	Scotland U17	10	(2)
2012–2013	Scotland U19	7	(0)
2012–2015	Scotland U21	13	(0)
2019	Scotland	1	(1)
- * Club domestic league appearances and goals as of 22 November 2026

Stuart John Findlay (born 14 September 1995) is a Scottish professional footballer who plays as a centre-back for Scottish Premiership club Heart of Midlothian. He has previously represented the Scotland national team at senior level.

== Early life ==
Stuart John Findlay was born on September 14, 1995 in the Glasgow suburb of Baillieston. He attended Trinity High School in Rutherglen and was in the same year group as fellow Celtic youth team player Dom Thomas, who broke through as a professional with Motherwell and was later a teammate at Kilmarnock.

== Club career ==
=== Celtic ===
Findlay came through the youth system at Celtic, making his first-team debut in a friendly against Norwich City. He also captained Celtic at under-17 level, and featured regularly for the Development side, taking part in the UEFA Youth League and the English Premier League International Cup.

==== Greenock Morton (loan) ====
In January 2014, Findlay signed for Greenock Morton on loan until the end of the season. He made his debut on 1 February in a 1–1 draw against league leaders Falkirk, turning in an impressive performance. Morton spent most of the season in an unsuccessful struggle against relegation, but Findlay continued to show promise. Morton lost 2–1 away at Raith Rovers on 15 March, but Findlay's pace and positional sense restricted Raith's goalscoring chances, and his overall performance was described as showing "composure beyond his years". His spell at Morton ended on an embarrassing note, however, his side losing 10–2 against Hamilton Accies in their last game of the season, including a Findlay own goal.

==== Dumbarton (loan) ====
On 16 January 2015, Findlay joined Scottish Championship club Dumbarton on loan until the end of the 2014–15 season. He impressed immediately, and was named the club's player of the month for February. He was noted for his composure with the ball, often carrying the ball out of defence with ease. Findlay himself pointed out that "coming through at Celtic it is in their philosophy that they want to play out from the back, they want their defenders to be good on the ball." His form also saw him named in the Scotland under-21 squad for a friendly with Hungary in March. He left the club at the end of his loan deal, having made 15 appearances and twice been the recipient of the player of the month award.

==== Kilmarnock (loan) ====
On 9 July 2015, it was confirmed that Findlay was going out on loan to Kilmarnock for the 2015–16 season. On 1 August 2015, Findlay made his Kilmarnock debut in a 4–0 defeat against Dundee, in which he featured for the entire 90 minutes.

=== Newcastle United ===
Findlay joined Football League Championship side Newcastle United on 8 July 2016, following his release from Celtic. He made his debut for Newcastle in an FA Cup tie against Birmingham City on 18 January 2017.

=== Kilmarnock ===
In August 2017, Findlay returned to Kilmarnock on loan from Newcastle. He made 36 appearances for the club during the 2017–18 season, then signed permanently with the Rugby Park outfit in July 2018. On 23 September 2018, he scored a last-minute winner in a league fixture at home to former club Celtic, giving Killie a 2–1 victory.

=== Philadelphia Union ===
On 25 February 2021, Findlay moved over to the United States, to join Major League Soccer club Philadelphia Union for an undisclosed fee on a two-year deal, with the option to extend a further year. He made his debut on 15 April 2021, coming off the bench in the side's 4–0 home win against Deportivo Saprissa in the CONCACAF Champions League. 27 June 2021, he made his first start for Philadelphia Union away against Chicago Fire in a 3–3 draw, also his first appearance in Major League Soccer.

=== Oxford United ===
On 19 July 2022, Findlay signed for EFL League One club Oxford United for an undisclosed fee on a four-year contract. He made his debut in the first league game of the season, a 1–0 away defeat to Derby County, and scored his first goal for the club in a 5–0 victory over Leyton Orient in the EFL Trophy group stage on 30 August 2022..

==== Kilmarnock (loan) ====
Findlay was loaned to Kilmarnock for the beginning of the 2023-24 season; he was then loaned in for a further season the following June.

==== Heart of Midlothian (loan) ====
On 19 June 2025, Heart of Midlothian announced they had signed Findlay on a one-year loan, with a view to making the move permanent at the end of the season. In joining Hearts, Findlay reunited with his former Kilmarnock manager Derek McInnes; who himself had just agreed to join the Edinburgh club.

=== Heart of Midlothian ===
In January 2026, Findlay agreed to join Hearts permanently, on a two-year deal, when his contract with Oxford United expired in July 2026.

== International career ==
Findlay was first called into the Scotland under-21 squad in November 2012 by coach Ricky Sbragia for a friendly against Portugal. His 13th and final cap at this age level was in October 2015 against France at Pittodrie Stadium.

Findlay received his first call-up to the senior Scotland squad in March 2019 for games against Kazakhstan and San Marino. He earned his first full international cap on 13 October 2019 in a 6–0 win over San Marino at Hampden Park, in which he played the full 90 minutes and scored Scotland's 5th goal.

== Career statistics ==
=== Club ===
As of 22 November 2026

Appearances and goals by club, season and competition
Club	Season	League			National cup (Note: Includes Scottish Cup, U.S. Open Cup, FA Cup)		League cup (Note: Includes Scottish League Cup, EFL Cup)		Continental		Other		Total	
Club	Season	Division	Apps	Goals	Apps	Goals	Apps	Goals	Apps	Goals	Apps	Goals	Apps	Goals
Celtic	2013–14	Scottish Premiership	0	0	0	0	0	0	0	0	—		0	0
Celtic	2014–15	Scottish Premiership	0	0	0	0	0	0	0	0	—		0	0
Celtic	2015–16	Scottish Premiership	0	0	0	0	0	0	0	0	—		0	0
Celtic	Total		0	0	0	0	0	0	0	0	—		0	0
Greenock Morton (loan)	2013–14	Scottish Championship	14	0	0	0	0	0	—		0	0	14	0
Dumbarton (loan)	2014–15	Scottish Championship	15	0	0	0	0	0	—		0	0	15	0
Kilmarnock (loan)	2015–16	Scottish Premiership	22	0	3	0	2	0	—		—		27	0
Newcastle United	2016–17	Championship	0	0	1	0	0	0	—		—		1	0
Newcastle United	2017–18	Premier League	0	0	0	0	0	0	—		—		0	0
Newcastle United	Total		0	0	1	0	0	0	—		—		1	0
Kilmarnock (loan)	2017–18	Scottish Premiership	32	3	4	0	0	0	—		—		36	3
Kilmarnock	2018–19	Scottish Premiership	31	3	1	1	2	0	—		—		34	4
Kilmarnock	2019–20	Scottish Premiership	18	1	2	2	2	0	2 (Note: Appearances in UEFA Europa League)	1	—		24	4
Kilmarnock	2020–21	Scottish Premiership	22	0	0	0	1	0	—		—		23	0
Kilmarnock	Total		71	4	3	3	5	0	2	1	—		81	8
Philadelphia Union	2021	Major League Soccer	8	0	—		—		1 (Note: Appearance in CONCACAF Champions League)	0	0	0	9	0
Philadelphia Union	2022	Major League Soccer	4	0	1	1	—		—		0	0	5	1
Philadelphia Union	Total		12	0	1	1	0	0	1	0	0	0	14	1
Oxford United	2022–23	League One	39	0	2	0	1	0	—		2 (Note: Appearances in EFL Trophy)	1	44	1
Kilmarnock (loan)	2023–24	Scottish Premiership	37	0	2	0	6	2	—		—		45	2
Kilmarnock (loan)	2024–25	Scottish Premiership	13	0	0	0	1	0	6 (Note: Two appearances in UEFA Europa League, four appearances in UEFA Conference League)	0	—		20	0
Kilmarnock (loan)	Total		50	0	2	0	7	2	6	0	—		65	2
Heart of Midlothian (loan)	2025–26	Scottish Premiership	34	5	1	0	4	1	—		—		39	6
Heart of Midlothian	2026–27	Scottish Premiership	9	1	0	0	2	0	6	0	—		17	1
Heart of Midlothian	Total		43	6	1	0	6	1	6	0	—		56	7
Career total			297	13	17	3	21	5	15	1	2	1	353	23

=== International ===
As of 13 October 2019

Appearances and goals by national team and year
National team	Year	Apps	Goals
Scotland	2019	1	1
Total		1	1

As of 13 October 2019
Scotland score listed first, score column indicates score after each Findlay goal

List of international goals scored by Stuart Findlay
No.	Date	Venue	Opponent	Score	Result	Competition
1	13 October 2019	Hampden Park, Glasgow, Scotland	San Marino	5–0	6–0	UEFA Euro 2020 qualification
