= Scott Boyd =

Scottish footballer

Personal information
- Date of birth: 4 June 1986 (age 40)
- Place of birth: Whitburn, Scotland
- Position: Defender

Youth career
- Livingston

Senior career*
Years	Team	Apps	(Gls)
2005–2006	Livingston	4	(0)
2006	→ Partick Thistle (loan)	7	(0)
2006–2007	Partick Thistle	36	(0)
2007–2008	→ Ross County (loan)	10	(1)
2008–2017	Ross County	250	(10)
2016–2017	→ Kilmarnock (loan)	13	(1)
2017–2019	Kilmarnock	34	(2)
Total		354	(14)
- * Club domestic league appearances and goals

Scott Boyd (born 4 June 1986) is a Scottish former professional footballer. In his career, Boyd played for Livingston, Partick Thistle, Ross County and Kilmarnock.

== Career ==
His career started with Livingston, from where he joined Partick Thistle on loan in January of the 2005–06 season. He helped the Jags to win promotion from the Second Division and, after the play-offs, Thistle then purchased his contract from Livingston. At the start of the 2007–08 with Partick Thistle promoted, Boyd had first team place limited and determined to fight for his place.

In September 2007, Boyd signed on loan for Ross County until January 2008. On 14 January 2008, he signed for Ross County on a permanent basis. Despite interests from Aberdeen, Boyd signed a new contract with the club.

In the 2009–10 season, Boyd netted a goal in the last minute to knock Hibs out of the Scottish Cup at the quarter-final Stage. Ross County went on to reach the 2010 Scottish Cup Final, but lost 3–0 to Dundee United. During the 2009–10 season, Boyd would also signed would sign a contract extension. Boyd was part of the Ross County team that gained promotion to the Scottish Premier League by winning the 2011–12 Scottish First Division. At the end of the season, Boyd signed a one-year contract with Ross County. While at Ross County, Boyd is known to fans as "Ginger Pele" because of his resemblance to Pelé.

At the end of the 2012–13 season, Boyd signed a new one-year contract with Ross County after helping them finish fifth in their first season in the Scottish Premier League. During the season, Boyd captained once in the season when he led Ross County win 3–2 against Celtic. On 1 January 2014, Boyd opened the scoring as Ross County won the New Year Highland derby match 2–1 away to Inverness Caledonian Thistle.

On 27 May 2014, he signed a new contract keeping him at Ross County for the 2014–15 season.

On 25 August 2015, Boyd became Ross County's record appearances holder since they joined the Scottish League, making his 288th appearance for the club in their 2–0 win against Ayr United in the Scottish League Cup.

On 31 August 2016, Boyd moved on a season-long loan to Kilmarnock. He then made the move permanent on 31 January 2017, signing until summer 2018. Boyd signed a new contract with Kilmarnock in March 2019, due to run until summer 2020.

He retired from playing in June 2019, returning to former club Ross County as sporting director.

== Career statistics ==
As of match played 20 June 2019

Appearances and goals by club, season and competition
Club	Season	League			Scottish Cup		League Cup		Other		Total	
Club	Season	Division	Apps	Goals	Apps	Goals	Apps	Goals	Apps	Goals	Apps	Goals
Livingston	2005–06	Scottish Premier League	4	0	0	0	1	0	—		5	0
Partick Thistle (loan)	2005–06	Scottish Second Division	7	0	3	0	0	0	2 (Note: Appearances in the First Division play-offs)	0	12	0
Partick Thistle	2006–07	Scottish First Division	36	0	3	0	2	1	1 (Note: Appearances in the Scottish Challenge Cup)	0	42	1
Partick Thistle	2007–08	Scottish First Division	0	0	0	0	0	0	0	0	0	0
Partick Thistle	Total		36	0	3	0	2	1	1	0	42	1
Ross County (loan)	2007–08	Scottish Second Division	10	1	1	0	0	0	0	0	11	1
Ross County	2007–08	Scottish Second Division	13	0	1	1	0	0	0	0	14	1
Ross County	2008–09	Scottish First Division	28	0	3 (Note: Includes 1 match not recorded on Soccerbase or Soccerway. "Dumbarton 1–2 Ross County". BBC Sport. 15 December 2008.)	0	0	0	5 (Note: Includes 2 Challenge Cup matches not recorded on Soccerbase or Soccerway. "Ross County 2–1 St Johnstone". BBC Sport. 26 July 2008. & "Clyde 0–1 Ross County". BBC Sport. 7 September 2008.)	0	36	0
Ross County	2009–10	Scottish First Division	31	4	7	1	0	0	2	0	40	5
Ross County	2010–11	Scottish First Division	33	3	2	0	3	0	5	0	43	3
Ross County	2011–12	Scottish First Division	35	2	4	0	3	0	0	0	42	2
Ross County	2012–13	Scottish Premier League	35	0	2	0	1	0	—		38	0
Ross County	2013–14	Scottish Premiership	28	1	1	0	0	0	—		29	1
Ross County	2014–15	Scottish Premiership	32	0	1	0	1	0	—		34	0
Ross County	2015–16	Scottish Premiership	15	0	2	0	2	0	—		19	0
Ross County	2016–17	Scottish Premiership	0	0	0	0	0	0	—		0	0
Ross County	Total		250	10	23	2	10	0	12	0	295	12
Kilmarnock (loan)	2016–17	Scottish Premiership	13	1	0	0	0	0	—		13	1
Kilmarnock	2016–17	Scottish Premiership	6	0	0	0	0	0	—		6	0
Kilmarnock	2017–18	Scottish Premiership	11	1	2	0	1	0	—		14	1
Kilmarnock	2018–19	Scottish Premiership	17	1	3	0	4	0	–		24	1
Kilmarnock	Total		34	2	5	0	5	0	0	0	44	2
Career total			354	14	35	2	18	1	15	0	421	17

== Honours ==
Ross County

- Scottish Challenge Cup: 2010–11
- Scottish League Cup: 2015–16
