= Jordan Jones (footballer, born 1994) =

Northern Irish professional footballer (born 1994)

Personal information
- Full name: Jordan Lewis Jones
- Date of birth: 24 October 1994 (age 32)
- Place of birth: Redcar, England
- Height: 1.74 m (5 ft 8 1/2 in)
- Position: Winger

Team information
- Current team: South Shields
- Number: 21

Youth career
- Redcar Town
- –2013: Middlesbrough

Senior career*
Years	Team	Apps	(Gls)
2013–2016	Middlesbrough	0	(0)
2015	→ Hartlepool United (loan)	11	(0)
2015	→ Cambridge United (loan)	1	(0)
2016–2019	Kilmarnock	97	(11)
2019–2021	Rangers	10	(1)
2021	→ Sunderland (loan)	19	(3)
2021–2024	Wigan Athletic	35	(3)
2022	→ St Mirren (loan)	11	(0)
2022–2023	→ Kilmarnock (loan)	22	(0)
2024	Wigan Athletic	2	(0)
2024–2026	Carlisle United	29	(0)
2026–	South Shields	3	(1)

International career^{‡}
- Northern Ireland U19
2017–2023	Northern Ireland	19	(1)
- * Club domestic league appearances and goals as of 18:20, 11 October 2026 (UTC) ‡ National team caps and goals as of 10:18, 23 August 2024 (UTC)

Jordan Lewis Jones (born 24 October 1994) is a professional footballer who last played as a winger for Carlisle United, and the Northern Ireland national team.

Jones has previously played for Middlesbrough, Hartlepool United, Cambridge United, Rangers, Sunderland, St Mirren and Kilmarnock. He has also played for the Northern Ireland national team, having made his full international debut in 2017.

== Club career ==
Jones started with his home-town club Redcar Town before joining the academy at Middlesbrough. He made one appearance for the Middlesbrough first team, in a 2012–13 FA Cup tie against Hastings United.

Jones was loaned to Hartlepool United in February 2015 and Cambridge United in November 2015. He was released by Middlesbrough at the end of the 2015–16 season.

Jones signed for Scottish Premiership club Kilmarnock in June 2016. In January 2018, Kilmarnock turned down an offer from Rangers to buy Jones for a reported £350,000 transfer fee. However, in January 2019 he signed a pre-contract agreement to join Rangers at the end of the 2018–19 season, and immediately tweeted a message expressing his delight at the "dream move" to the Glasgow club, which annoyed many Kilmarnock supporters as he would still be representing their team for several months, and only a point separated his current and future employers at the top of the league table. Jones later admitted he had been "over-excited" in sending the message, while Killie manager Steve Clarke defended the player and confirmed he would have no hesitation in playing him while he remained with the Ayrshire club. That backing was rewarded when Jones scored the winning goal in the next league fixture at Rugby Park, against Rangers; the 2–1 result boosted Kilmarnock's title hopes while denting those of the Gers.

=== Rangers ===
In June 2019 Jones said he wanted to be a first-team player at Rangers. He made his competitive debut for the club on 9 July 2019 in a 4–0 win over St Joseph's of Gibraltar in the 2019–20 UEFA Europa League.

Jones scored his first Rangers goal on 27 September 2020 against Motherwell at Fir Park, the second in a 5–1 win. On 2 November 2020 it was announced that Jones and George Edmundson had been suspended by Rangers, pending an internal investigation, for attending a party and breaching COVID-19 regulations.

On 29 January 2021, Jones joined English club Sunderland on loan for the remainder of the 2020–21 season. He scored his first goal for Sunderland on 27 February 2021 in a 2–2 draw against Crewe Alexandra.

=== Wigan Athletic ===
On 4 August 2021, Wigan Athletic signed Jones from Rangers on a three-year deal.

On 31 January 2022, Jones signed for St Mirren on loan until the end of the 2021–22 season. He was then loaned to Kilmarnock in July 2022. Wigan tried to recall him from the loan on 31 January 2023, but did not submit the paperwork before the deadline.

On 30 June 2024, Jones was released by Wigan, before being re-signed on a short term deal on 9 August. He was then released by mutual consent on 22 August after two sub appearances. The following week, he joined League Two side Carlisle United on a three-year deal.

On 9 May 2026, Carlisle United announced Jones' departure from the club, making him a free agent.

=== South Shields ===
On 6 September 2026, Jones joined Shields to link up with previous manager Mike Williamson

== International career ==
Though born in England, Jones is able to represent Northern Ireland through his Northern Irish father. Aged 17, he represented their U19 team but turned down an opportunity to be part of the U21 squad.

In September 2017, he was called up to the senior Northern Ireland squad for 2018 FIFA World Cup qualifiers against Germany and Norway, but did not play in either game.He won his first senior cap for Northern Ireland in the 2018 World Cup Qualifying play-off second leg against Switzerland on 12 November 2017, coming on as a substitute replacing Jamie Ward.

== Career statistics ==
=== Club ===
As of 10 October 2026

Appearances and goals by club, season and competition
Club	Season	League			National Cup		League Cup		Other		Total	
Club	Season	Division	Apps	Goals	Apps	Goals	Apps	Goals	Apps	Goals	Apps	Goals
Middlesbrough	2012–13	Championship	0	0	1	0	0	0	—		1	0
Middlesbrough	2013–14	Championship	0	0	0	0	0	0	—		0	0
Middlesbrough	2014–15	Championship	0	0	0	0	0	0	—		0	0
Middlesbrough	2015–16	Championship	0	0	—		0	0	—		0	0
Middlesbrough	Total		0	0	1	0	0	0	—		1	0
Hartlepool United (loan)	2014–15	League Two	11	0	—		—		—		11	0
Cambridge United (loan)	2015–16	League Two	1	0	0	0	—		—		1	0
Kilmarnock	2016–17	Scottish Premiership	37	3	1	0	4	0	—		42	3
Kilmarnock	2017–18	Scottish Premiership	32	4	4	0	5	0	—		41	4
Kilmarnock	2018–19	Scottish Premiership	28	4	2	0	5	0	—		35	4
Kilmarnock	Total		97	11	7	0	14	0	—		118	11
Rangers	2019–20	Scottish Premiership	7	0	1	0	1	0	6 (Note: Appearances in UEFA Europa League)	0	15	0
Rangers	2020–21	Scottish Premiership	3	1	0	0	0	0	1	0	4	1
Rangers	Total		10	1	1	0	1	0	7	0	19	1
Sunderland (loan)	2020–21	League One	19	3	0	0	0	0	2 (Note: One appearance in EFL Trophy, one in EFL League One play-offs)	0	21	3
Wigan Athletic	2021–22	League One	9	0	3	0	3	0	2 (Note: Appearances in EFL Trophy)	0	17	0
Wigan Athletic	2022–23	Championship	0	0	0	0	0	0	—		0	0
Wigan Athletic	2023–24	League One	26	3	3	0	0	0	4 (Note: Appearances in EFL Trophy)	0	33	3
Wigan Athletic	Total		35	3	6	0	3	0	6	0	50	3
St Mirren (loan)	2021–22	Scottish Premiership	11	0	2	1	0	0	—		13	1
Kilmarnock (loan)	2022–23	Scottish Premiership	22	0	2	1	3	0	—		27	1
Wigan Athletic	2024–25	League One	2	0	0	0	0	0	0	0	2	0
Carlisle United	2024–25	League Two	21	0	0	0	0	0	0	0	21	0
Carlisle United	2025–26	National League	8	0	2	0	0	0	0	0	10	0
Carlisle United	Total		29	0	2	0	0	0	0	0	31	0
South Shields	2026–27	National League North	3	1	2	0	0	0	0	0	5	1
Career total			240	19	23	2	21	0	15	0	289	21

=== International ===
As of match played 10 September 2023

Appearances and goals by national team and year
National team	Year	Apps	Goals
Northern Ireland	2017	1	0
Northern Ireland	2018	4	0
Northern Ireland	2019	4	0
Northern Ireland	2020	2	0
Northern Ireland	2021	7	1
Northern Ireland	2023	1	0
Total		19	1

Scores and results list Northern Ireland's goal tally first.

List of international goals scored by Jordan Jones
No.	Date	Venue	Opponent	Score	Result	Competition
1	30 May 2021	Wörthersee Stadion, Klagenfurt, Austria	Malta	1–0	3–0	Friendly

== Honours ==
Individual

- PFA Scotland Team of the Year: 2017–18 Scottish Premiership
