= 2017–18 Kilmarnock F.C. season =

Kilmarnock
2017–18 season
- Chairman: Billy Bowie
- Manager: Lee McCulloch; Paul McDonald; Steve Clarke
- Stadium: Rugby Park
- Premiership: 5th
- Scottish Cup: Quarter-final
- League Cup: Second round
- Top goalscorer: League: Kris Boyd (18); All: Kris Boyd (23)
- Highest home attendance: 11,490 (vs Rangers, 23 December 2017)
- Lowest home attendance: 3,337 (vs Ross County, 30 September 2017)
Home colours	Away colours

The 2017–18 season was Kilmarnock's fifth season in the Premiership, and their 25th consecutive season in the top flight of Scotlish football.

== Overview ==
Following a pre-season training camp in La Manga, Spain, Kilmarnock played one friendly before the season began against Livingston.

Kilmarnock were seeded for the group stage draw of the League Cup and were drawn to face rivals Ayr United along with Dumbarton, Clyde and Annan Athletic.

In their opening fixture, Kilmarnock lost their first Ayrshire derby for 18 years after Andy Geggan scored the only goal at Somerset Park. After the early setback, Kilmarnock recovered to finish second in Group E and qualified for the second round where they would play defending champions Celtic at Celtic Park. There was a question over whether Celtic should have been awarded a penalty after 13 minutes when Jonny Hayes appeared to dive in the box but it made little difference as they eased to a 5–0 win and knocked Kilmarnock out.

The Premiership season began on 5 August 2017 and is scheduled to conclude on 13 May 2018. Kilmarnock were originally scheduled to play their first away match on 12 August 2017 against Heart of Midlothian but the fixture was reversed due to the redevelopment of Tynecastle Stadium. Their first away game of the season was instead played on 9 September 2017 against Motherwell, their fifth league fixture. The rearranged Hearts tie, due to be played on 5 November 2017, was subsequently switched to Murrayfield Stadium because the redevelopment works had taken longer than initially scheduled.

Kilmarnock picked up their first point of the season in a 2–2 home draw with Hamilton Academical in their fourth game. The away side managed to hold Kilmarnock to a draw by scoring a last-minute penalty to come back from 2–0 down. Top scorer Kris Boyd picked up a hamstring injury during the match.

Kilmarnock's match against Hibernian on 21 October 2017 was postponed due to Hibernian's participation in the League Cup semi-finals and was rearranged to be played on 31 October 2017.

Following a 2–0 home defeat to Ross County, Kilmarnock parted company with manager Lee McCulloch on 1 October 2017. Kilmarnock had won none of their opening eight league matches scoring only five goals as they sat bottom of the table with just three points. On 14 October 2017 Kilmarnock announced that former West Bromwich Albion and Reading manager Steve Clarke would take over as manager from 16 October 2017. Academy director Paul McDonald took charge of the game against Partick Thistle on 14 October 2017.

With new manager Steve Clarke watching from the stand, Kilmarnock claimed their first league win of the season with a 2–0 victory at Firhill Stadium against fellow strugglers Partick Thistle. Top scorer Kris Boyd scored his first goal since August as Kilmarnock moved off the bottom of the league.

Clarke had to wait until 25 October for his first game in charge of the team at Ibrox Stadium against Rangers. The home side took the lead shortly before half time when Jason Holt scored. However, as Clark alluded to after the game, his side looked as if they deserved something from the game. In a dramatic final few minutes, Rangers were awarded a penalty before Ryan Jack was sent off for Rangers on 93 minutes. Daniel Candeias stepped up but his effort was saved by Killie keeper Jamie MacDonald and Kilmarnock broke up the other end with former Rangers midfielder Chris Burke netting the equaliser.

Just three days later, Clarke's side recorded another creditable draw in Glasgow after Jordan Jones scored a 60th-minute equaliser against Celtic at Celtic Park.

Clarke's first home game in charge saw Killie take on Hibernian on Halloween. The scoreline may suggest a Halloween horror show for Clarke's men but the home side were extremely unlucky - creating 16 scoring opportunities in the match - as a clinical Hibs recorded a 3–0 win.

Murrayfield Stadium was the scene for Clarke's first win in charge against Hearts on 5 November 2017. Kris Boyd had given Killie a 1–0 half-time lead before Esmaël Gonçalves equalised with 14 minutes to go. Adam Frizzell scored his second goal of the season 10 minutes later as Killie earned a 2–1 win.

Kilmarnock had to wait until 9 December 2017 for their first home league win of the season against Partick Thistle. Chris Erskine had cancelled out Kris Boyd's opener before Killie ran riot with Eamonn Brophy scoring twice, Boyd getting his second and an unfortunate own goal from Niall Keown earning them a 5–1 win as they moved up to eighth in the Premiership. It was the first time Kilmarnock had scored five goals in a league game since a 5–1 SPL win against Dunfermline Athletic in December 2006, 11 years ago.

Clarke's Kilmarnock continued to break records as they picked up their 13th point in five games with a first win over Rangers at Rugby Park since 2011 and a third consecutive home win for the first time in three years. Kris Boyd scored his 10th and 11th goals of the season as Killie came from behind to earn a deserved 2–1 win against the Glasgow side. The three points saw Kilmarnock spend Christmas in the top six as they moved up two places to sixth in the table.

Killie's Premiership match with Hamilton Academical on 27 December 2017 was postponed after the pitch at New Douglas Park failed a second inspection. Hamilton claimed that the match was "swept away by nature" after snow - which had been left on the pitch overnight - had frozen leaving the artificial surface unplayable.

Hibernian were the opponents for Killie's last match of 2017 and their last match ahead of the three-week winter break. A Kris Boyd goal earned Kilmarnock a 1–1 draw at Easter Road as they extended their unbeaten away run to nine matches and ended December unbeaten with four wins and two draws. The point moved Kilmarnock back above St Johnstone as they ended the year in the top six. On Monday 15 January 2018, Clarke was named Premiership manager of the month for December with Kris Boyd named player of the month after scoring six goals in December.

Kilmarnock were due to play St Johnstone on 24 January 2018 at Rugby Park but the match was postponed after the Perth Saints' Scottish Cup match with Albion Rovers was postponed due to a frozen pitch at Cliftonhill and subsequently rearranged to be played on 23 January 2018. The match against Dundee on 31 January 2018 suffered a similar fate after it was postponed due to the clash Dundee's Scottish Cup fourth round replay against Inverness Caledonian Thistle on the same day.

Kilmarnock entered the fourth round of Scottish Cup as one of the Premiership clubs, starting on 20 January 2018. The draw for the fourth round was made on Monday, 20 November 2017 and Kilmarnock were drawn at home to fellow Premiership side Ross County. Lee Erwin scored the only goal of the game from the penalty spot after Tim Chow was sent off late on.

The fifth round draw was made on 21 January 2018 and Kilmarnock were drawn at home to Highland League side Brora Rangers. The two teams had never played against each other before and Brora made it tough for Kilmarnock but the Premiership side ran out 4–0 winners.

The draw for the quarter-finals was made on 11 February 2018 and Kilmarnock were drawn away to fellow Premiership side Aberdeen. After conceding an early goal at Pittodrie Stadium, Killie battled back and earned a replay at Rugby Park thanks to a Kris Boyd penalty.

Kilmarnock's cup run came to an end in the replay at Rugby Park. The 90 minutes ended in a stalemate and, with a place in the semi-finals against Motherwell awaiting the winner, Stephen O'Donnell gave the home side the lead six minutes into extra-time. Aberdeen equalised through a Kenny McLean penalty before Eamonn Brophy had a goal controversially disallowed for offside. In the penalty shoot-out, former Killie keeper Freddie Woodman saved three penalties to see Aberdeen through 3–2.

== Match results ==
=== Pre-season and friendlies ===
Date	Opponents	H / A	Result F–A	Scorers
8 July 2017	Livingston	H	1–0	Waters 50'

=== Premiership ===
Date	Opponents	H / A	Result F–A	Scorers	Attendance	League position
5 August 2017	St Johnstone	H	1–2	K. Boyd 59'	3,395	8th
12 August 2017	Heart of Midlothian	H	0–1		5,076	9th
19 August 2017	Celtic	H	0–2		10,069	10th
26 August 2017	Hamilton Academical	H	2–2	Longridge (o.g.) 3', Erwin 58'	3,706	10th
9 September 2017	Motherwell	A	0–2		4,621	11th
16 September 2017	Aberdeen	A	1–1	Jones 48'	15,037	12th
23 September 2017	Dundee	H	1–1	Greer 64'	3,452	12th
30 September 2017	Ross County	H	0–2		3,337	12th
14 October 2017	Partick Thistle	A	2–0	K. Boyd 39', Frizzell 63'	3,662	11th
21 October 2017	Hibernian	H	Postponed			
25 October 2017	Rangers	A	1–1	Burke 90+5'	47,981	11th
28 October 2017	Celtic	A	1–1	Jones 60'	58,060	11th
31 October 2017	Hibernian	H	0–3		5,005	11th
5 November 2017	Heart of Midlothian	A	2–1	K. Boyd 31', Frizzell 86'	16,347	10th
18 November 2017	Dundee	A	0–0		5,853	10th
26 November 2017	Aberdeen	H	1–3	Jones 66'	4,198	10th
2 December 2017	St Johnstone	A	2–1	Findlay 10', Brophy 66'	2,950	10th
9 December 2017	Partick Thistle	H	5–1	K. Boyd 12', 79' (pen.), Brophy 20', 65', Keown (o.g.) 60'	4,339	8th
12 December 2017	Ross County	A	2–2	Brophy 61', K. Boyd 86'	3,021	8th
16 December 2017	Motherwell	H	1–0	S. Boyd 42'	4,179	8th
23 December 2017	Rangers	H	2–1	K. Boyd 77', 80'	11,490	6th
27 December 2017	Hamilton Academical	A	Postponed			
30 December 2017	Hibernian	A	1–1	K. Boyd 1'	17,666	6th
24 January 2018	St Johnstone	H	Postponed			
27 January 2018	Aberdeen	A	1–3	K. Boyd 28'	13,723	7th
31 January 2018	Dundee	H	Postponed			
3 February 2018	Celtic	H	1–0	Mulumbu 70'	10,702	6th
13 February 2018	Dundee	H	3–2	Brophy 5', K. Boyd 74', Wilson 87'	3,768	7th
17 February 2018	Motherwell	A	1–0	O'Donnell 34'	5,322	6th
24 February 2018	Hibernian	H	2–2	Jones 58', K. Boyd 61'	5,348	6th
27 February 2018	Heart of Midlothian	A	1–1	Brophy 3'	15,862	6th
7 March 2018	St Johnstone	H	2–0	K. Boyd 30' (pen.), Erwin 58'	3,807	5th
10 March 2018	Ross County	H	3–2	Erwin 16', K. Boyd 45', Brophy 74'	4,001	5th
13 March 2018	Hamilton Academical	A	Postponed			
17 March 2018	Rangers	A	1–0	K. Boyd 54'	49,396	5th
31 March 2018	Hamilton Academical	H	2–0	Erwin 5', O'Donnell 45+4'	4,672	5th
7 April 2018	Partick Thistle	A	1–0	Findlay 35'	4,227	5th
14 April 2018	Hamilton Academical	A	2–1	Broadfoot 63', K. Boyd 79'	4,348	5th
21 April 2018	Aberdeen	H	0–2		5,067	5th
28 April 2018	Hibernian	A	3–5	K. Boyd 33', 80', Findlay 61'	17,470	5th
5 May 2018	Rangers	A	0–1		49,703	5th
9 May 2018	Celtic	A	0–0		54,916	5th
13 May 2018	Heart of Midlothian	H	1–0	Erwin 10'	6,273	5th

=== Scottish Cup ===
Date	Round	Opponents	H / A	Result F–A	Scorers	Attendance
20 January 2018	Fourth round	Ross County	H	1–0	Erwin 88' (pen.)	3,595
10 February 2018	Fifth round	Brora Rangers	H	4–0	Tshibola 42', K. Boyd 58', Brophy 76', O'Donnell 82'	4,278
3 March 2018	Quarter-final	Aberdeen	A	1–1	K. Boyd 68' (pen.)	8,739
13 March 2018	Quarter-final replay	Aberdeen	H	1–1 (a.e.t.); 2–3p	O'Donnell 96'	8,998

=== League Cup ===
Date	Round	Opponents	H / A	Result F–A	Scorers	Attendance
14 July 2017	Group stage	Ayr United	A	0–1		6,417
18 July 2017	Group stage	Clyde	H	4–2	McKenzie 7', 68', Thomas 53', 59'	1,871
22 July 2017	Group stage	Annan Athletic	A	2–0	K. Boyd 7', 62'	743
29 July 2017	Group stage	Dumbarton	H	3–0	Burke 53', K. Boyd 72', Erwin 76'	2,444
8 August 2017	Second round	Celtic	A	0–5		27,407

== Squad statistics ==
No.	Pos.	Name	League		Scottish Cup		League Cup		Total		Discipline	
No.	Pos.	Name	Apps	Goals	Apps	Goals	Apps	Goals	Apps	Goals	Yellow card	Red card
1	GK	(Scotland) Jamie MacDonald	35	0	3	0	5	0	43	0	1	0
2	DF	(Scotland) Stephen O'Donnell	36	2	4	2	4	0	44	4	5	0
3	DF	(Scotland) Steven Smith	3	0	0	0	0	0	3	0	1	0
4	DF	(Scotland) Gordon Greer	20	1	0	0	1	0	21	1	3	0
5	DF	(Scotland) Kirk Broadfoot	30	1	4	0	5	0	39	1	9	1
6	MF	(Republic of Ireland) Alan Power	24	0	3	0	4	0	31	0	5	0
7	MF	(Scotland) Rory McKenzie	25	0	3	0	5	2	33	2	8	0
8	MF	(Republic of Ireland) Gary Dicker	21	0	4	0	0	0	25	0	9	1
9	FW	(Scotland) Kris Boyd (c)	34	18	4	2	4	3	42	23	2	0
10	FW	(England) Greg Kiltie	9	0	4	0	0	0	13	0	0	0
11	MF	(Northern Ireland) Jordan Jones	32	4	4	0	5	0	41	4	9	1
12	DF	(Scotland) Greg Taylor	38	0	3	0	4	0	45	0	6	0
14	DF	(Scotland) Daniel Higgins	0	0	0	0	1	0	1	0	1	0
15	MF	(Scotland) Dom Thomas	9	0	0	0	4	2	13	2	0	0
16	DF	(Scotland) Scott Boyd	11	1	2	0	1	0	14	1	1	1
17	DF	(Scotland) Stuart Findlay	32	3	4	0	0	0	36	3	1	0
18	DF	(Scotland) Calum Waters	5	0	0	0	1	0	6	0	1	0
19	FW	(Iran) Alex Samizadeh	1	0	0	0	2	0	3	0	0	0
20	MF	(Scotland) Iain Wilson	13	1	0	0	5	0	18	1	4	0
21	MF	(Scotland) Adam Frizzell	15	2	1	0	5	0	21	2	3	0
22	FW	(Scotland) Lee Erwin	34	5	4	1	2	1	40	7	3	0
23	MF	(Scotland) Dean Hawkshaw	5	0	0	0	0	0	5	0	0	0
24	MF	(Democratic Republic of the Congo) Youssouf Mulumbu	18	1	2	0	0	0	20	1	4	0
25	FW	(Scotland) Eamonn Brophy	28	7	4	1	0	0	32	8	4	0
26	DF	(England) Aaron Simpson	4	0	0	0	0	0	4	0	0	0
27	FW	(Democratic Republic of the Congo) Aaron Tshibola	12	0	2	1	0	0	14	1	5	0
29	MF	(Scotland) Chris Burke	20	1	1	0	4	1	25	2	1	0
30	MF	(Scotland) Will Graham	0	0	0	0	4	0	4	0	0	0
32	GK	(Italy) Leo Fasan	3	0	1	0	0	0	4	0	0	0

== Club statistics ==
=== Competition overview ===
Competition	First match	Last match	Starting round	Final position	Record							
Competition	First match	Last match	Starting round	Final position	Pld	W	D	L	GF	GA	GD	Win %
Premiership	5 August 2017	13 May 2018	Matchday 1	Matchday 38	38	16	11	11	49	47	+2	42.11
Scottish Cup	20 January 2018	13 March 2018	Fourth round	Quarter-final replay	4	2	2	0	7	2	+5	50.00
League Cup	14 July 2017	8 August 2017	Group stage	Second round	5	3	0	2	9	8	+1	60.00
Total					47	21	13	13	65	57	+8	44.68

Source: Competitions

=== League table ===
Pos	Team	Pld	W	D	L	GF	GA	GD	Pts	Qualification or relegation (Note: Teams play each other three times (33 matches) before the league is split into two groups (the top six and the bottom six).)
3	Rangers	38	21	7	10	76	50	+26	70	Qualification for the Europa League first qualifying round
4	Hibernian	38	18	13	7	62	46	+16	67	Qualification for the Europa League first qualifying round
5	Kilmarnock	38	16	11	11	49	47	+2	59	
6	Heart of Midlothian	38	12	13	13	39	39	0	49	
7	Motherwell	38	13	9	16	43	49	−6	48	

Source: Soccerway BBC
Rules for classification: 1) Points; 2) Goal difference; 3) Goals scored; 4) Play-off (only if deciding champion, UEFA competitions qualification and second-stage group allocation).

=== League cup table ===
Pos	Team	Pld	W	PW	PL	L	GF	GA	GD	Pts	Qualification
1	Ayr United (Q)	4	4	0	0	0	15	3	+12	12	Qualification for the Second Round
2	Kilmarnock (Q)	4	3	0	0	1	9	3	+6	9	Qualification for the Second Round
3	Clyde	4	2	0	0	2	7	11	−4	6	
4	Annan Athletic	4	0	1	0	3	2	10	−8	2	
5	Dumbarton	4	0	0	1	3	2	8	−6	1	

Rules for classification: 1) goal difference, 2) goals scored, 3) away goals scored, 4) matches won, 5) away matches won, 6) drawing of lots.
(Q) Qualified to the phase indicated

== Player transfers ==
=== Transfers in ===
Date	Pos.	Name	From	Fee	Source
23 June 2017	DF	Daniel Higgins	Dundee	Free	
23 June 2017	MF	(Republic of Ireland) Alan Power	(England) Lincoln City	Free	
29 June 2017	DF	Calum Waters	Alloa Athletic	Free	
4 July 2017	DF	Stephen O'Donnell	(England) Luton Town	Free	
4 July 2017	DF	Kirk Broadfoot	(England) Rotherham United	Free	
12 July 2017	MF	Dom Thomas	Motherwell	Free	
14 July 2017	FW	(Iran) Alex Samizadeh	(England) Bolton Wanderers	Free	
18 July 2017	MF	Chris Burke	Ross County	Free	
28 July 2017	FW	Lee Erwin	(England) Leeds United	Free	
31 July 2017	DF	Gordon Greer	(England) Blackburn Rovers	Free	
4 August 2017	GK	Cammy Bell	Dundee United	Free	
18 August 2017	FW	Eamonn Brophy	Hamilton Academical	Free	
18 August 2017	MF	Brad Spencer	(United States) Houston Dynamo	Free	
25 August 2017	DF	Stuart Findlay	(England) Newcastle United	Loan	
22 November 2017	MF	(Democratic Republic of the Congo) Youssouf Mulumbu	(England) Norwich City	Free	
29 January 2018	MF	(Democratic Republic of the Congo) Aaron Tshibola	(England) Aston Villa	Loan	
31 January 2018	DF	(England) Aaron Simpson	(England) Wolverhampton Wanderers	Loan	
31 January 2018	GK	(Australia) Jasko Keranovic	(England) West Bromwich Albion	Loan	
1 February 2018	GK	(Italy) Leo Fasan	(England) Bury	Free	

=== Transfers out ===
Date	Pos.	Name	To	Fee	Source
4 July 2017	MF	Jack Whittaker	Cowdenbeath	Free	
26 July 2017	FW	(England) Nathan Tyson	(England) Wycombe Wanderers	Free	
26 July 2017	DF	(England) Karleigh Osborne	(England) Grimsby Town	Free	
19 October 2017	MF	(England) Martin Smith	(Northern Ireland) Coleraine	Free	
30 January 2018	MF	Dom Thomas	Queen of the South	Loan	
31 January 2018	GK	Cammy Bell	Hibernian	Free	
31 January 2018	DF	Daniel Higgins	Airdrieonians	Loan	
31 January 2018	MF	Dean Hawkshaw	Stranraer	Loan	
30 March 2018	MF	Adam Frizzell	Livingston	Loan	

== Notes ==
1. Note 1: McCulloch left Kilmarnock by mutual consent on 1 October 2017. McDonald took charge of one match before Clarke was appointed permanent manager on 16 October 2017.
