= Iain Wilson =

Scottish footballer

Personal information
- Date of birth: 15 December 1998 (age 27)
- Place of birth: Irvine, Scotland
- Position: Midfielder

Team information
- Current team: Greenock Morton
- Number: 27

Youth career
- Kilmarnock

Senior career*
Years	Team	Apps	(Gls)
2016–2020	Kilmarnock	43	(1)
2019	→ Queen of the South (loan)	14	(1)
2020	→ Queen of the South (loan)	8	(0)
2020–2022	Dunfermline Athletic	23	(0)
2022	Greenock Morton	13	(1)
2022–2024	Queen of the South	25	(1)
2023–2024	→ Greenock Morton (loan)	17	(1)
2024–	Greenock Morton	57	(2)

International career^{‡}
2015	Scotland U17	5	(0)
2015	Scotland U19	4	(0)
2017	Scotland U20	4	(0)
2017–2018	Scotland U21	8	(0)
- * Club domestic league appearances and goals as of 4 May 2026 ‡ National team caps and goals as of 17:00, 6 May 2023 (UTC)

Iain Wilson (born 15 December 1998) is a Scottish footballer who plays as a midfielder for Scottish Championship club Greenock Morton. Wilson has previously played for Kilmarnock, Dunfermline Athletic, and Queen of the South. Wilson also had two previous loan spells at the Doonhamers and has also represented Scotland from under-17 to under-21 levels.

== Club career ==
On 6 December 2016, Wilson debuted for Kilmarnock as a half-time in a match versus Aberdeen in a 5-1 defeat. On 29 January 2019, Wilson was loaned out to Queen of the South for the remainder of the 2018-19 season. In January 2020, Wilson returned to the Dumfries club for a second loan spell.

In July 2020, Wilson departed Killie and signed for Dunfermline Athletic on a two-year deal. On 30 January 2022, Wilson departed the Pars by mutual consent and the following day signed for Greenock Morton until the end of the 2021-22 season.

On 2 June 2022, Wilson signed a two-year contract for Queen of the South, having previously had two loan spells at Palmerston.

On 16 August 2023, Wilson rejoined Greenock Morton on a season-long loan from the Dumfries club.

== International career ==
Selected for the Scotland under-20 squad in the 2017 Toulon Tournament, Wilson played as Scotland beat Brazil under-20s 1–0, which was the nations first ever win against Brazil at any level. The team went on to claim the bronze medal. It was the nations first ever medal at the competition.

Selected for the under-21 squad in the 2018 Toulon Tournament. They lost to Turkey under-21s in a penalty-out and finished fourth.

== Career statistics ==
As of 7 May 2023

Appearances and goals by club, season and competition
Club	Season	League			Scottish Cup		League Cup		Other		Total	
Club	Season	Division	Apps	Goals	Apps	Goals	Apps	Goals	Apps	Goals	Apps	Goals
Kilmarnock	2016–17	Scottish Premiership	20	0	0	0	0	0	1 (Note: Appearance for Kilmarnock under-20s in the Scottish Challenge Cup in which age-restricted sides from the Scottish Premiership clubs compete against senior clubs)	0	21	0
Kilmarnock	2017–18	Scottish Premiership	13	1	0	0	5	0	0	0	18	1
Kilmarnock	2018–19	Scottish Premiership	6	0	1	0	2	0	0	0	9	0
Kilmarnock	2019–20	Scottish Premiership	4	0	0	0	0	0	0	0	4	0
Kilmarnock	Total		43	1	1	0	7	0	1	0	52	1
Queen of the South (loan)	2018–19	Scottish Championship	14	1	0	0	0	0	4 (Note: Appearances in the Scottish Championship play-offs)	0	18	1
Queen of the South (loan)	2019–20	Scottish Championship	8	0	0	0	0	0	0	0	8	0
Queen of the South (loan)	Total		22	1	0	0	0	0	4	0	26	1
Dunfermline Athletic	2020–21	Scottish Championship	20	0	1	0	6	1	0	0	27	1
Dunfermline Athletic	2021-22	Scottish Championship	3	0	0	0	0	0	0	0	3	0
Dunfermline Athletic	Total		23	0	1	0	6	1	0	0	30	1
Greenock Morton (loan)	2021-22	Scottish Championship	13	1	0	0	0	0	0	0	13	1
Queen of the South	2022-23	Scottish League One	25	1	1	0	1	0	2	0	29	1
Greenock Morton (loan)	2023-24	Scottish Championship	0	0	0	0	0	0	0	0	0	0
Career total			126	4	3	0	14	1	7	0	150	5
