= Eamonn Brophy =

Scottish footballer (born 1996)

Personal information
- Full name: Eamonn Brophy
- Date of birth: 10 March 1996 (age 30)
- Place of birth: Glasgow, Scotland
- Height: 5 ft 9 in (1.75 m)
- Position: Striker

Team information
- Current team: Greenock Morton

Youth career
- 2003–2011: Celtic
- 2011–2012: Hibernian
- 2012–2013: Hamilton Academical

Senior career*
Years	Team	Apps	(Gls)
2013–2017	Hamilton Academical	66	(7)
2014	→ Queen's Park (loan)	9	(7)
2015	→ Dumbarton (loan)	10	(1)
2017–2021	Kilmarnock	100	(29)
2021	→ St Mirren (loan)	6	(0)
2021–2023	St Mirren	43	(7)
2023	→ Ross County (loan)	8	(3)
2023–2025	Ross County	36	(3)
2025	→ Falkirk (loan)	4	(0)
2025–	Greenock Morton	29	(7)

International career^{‡}
2014–2015	Scotland U19	4	(0)
2016–2018	Scotland U21	3	(0)
2019	Scotland	1	(0)
- * Club domestic league appearances and goals as of 11:50, 26 September 2026 (UTC) ‡ National team caps and goals as of 05:34, 9 June 2019 (UTC)

Eamonn Brophy (born 10 March 1996) is a Scottish professional footballer who plays as a striker for Greenock Morton.

Brophy has previously played for Celtic, Hibernian, Hamilton Academical, Queen's Park, Dumbarton, Kilmarnock, St Mirren, Falkirk and Ross County, and made his senior international debut for Scotland in 2019.

== Club career ==
Brophy is a product of the Celtic and Hibernian youth systems, but both considered him too short at the time. He turned professional with Hamilton Academical in July 2012. He made his senior debut on 9 April 2013, scoring a goal in the process.

On 6 March 2014, Brophy signed for Scottish League Two club Queen's Park on loan until the end of the 2013–14 season. He made his debut for the club on 8 March 2014, scoring in a 3–1 defeat against Clyde.

He joined Scottish Championship outfit Dumbarton on loan in September 2015.

On 18 August 2017, Brophy signed for Kilmarnock, on a three-year contract. On the last day of the 2018–19 season, Brophy's 89th-minute penalty saw Kilmarnock beat Rangers 2–1 to seal a place in the 2019–20 UEFA Europa League – the first time the club had qualified for a European competition since the 2001–02 UEFA Cup.

Brophy signed a pre-contract agreement with St Mirren in January 2021 to transfer in the summer, although St Mirren were hoping to sign him that month instead. Kilmarnock manager Alex Dyer said that he "probably" wouldn't select Brophy again, as the player wanted to leave the club. Brophy was loaned to St Mirren for the rest of the 2020–21 season, filling the period before his permanent move.

In January 2023, he moved on loan to Ross County for the remainder of the season. The transfer was made permanent in June 2023. In January 2025, after falling out-of-favour at Ross County, he signed on loan for Falkirk.

In August 2025 he left Ross County by mutual consent, in order to sign for Greenock Morton.

== International career ==
Brophy has played for Scotland at under-19 level. He was selected for the under-21 squad for the first time in October 2016, for a friendly match against Slovakia, in which he made his debut as Scotland lost 4–0 on 9 November 2016.

He received his first call-up to the Scotland senior national team for UEFA Euro 2020 qualifying fixtures in May 2019. He made his senior debut on 8 June 2019 in a 2–1 victory against Cyprus at Hampden Park.

== Career statistics ==
As of match played 27 September 2025

Appearances and goals by club, season and competition
Club	Season	League			Scottish Cup		League Cup		Other		Total	
Club	Season	Division	Apps	Goals	Apps	Goals	Apps	Goals	Apps	Goals	Apps	Goals
Hamilton Academical	2012–13	Scottish First Division	1	1	0	0	0	0	0	0	1	1
Hamilton Academical	2013–14	Scottish Championship	7	0	1	0	0	0	1 (Note: Appearance in the Scottish Challenge Cup.)	0	9	0
Hamilton Academical	2014–15	Scottish Premiership	16	0	0	0	3	1	—		19	1
Hamilton Academical	2015–16	Scottish Premiership	14	4	1	0	0	0	—		15	4
Hamilton Academical	2016–17	Scottish Premiership	28	2	3	0	0	0	0	0	31	2
Hamilton Academical	Total		66	7	5	0	3	1	1	0	75	8
Queen's Park (loan)	2013–14	Scottish League Two	9	7	0	0	0	0	0	0	9	7
Dumbarton (loan)	2015–16	Scottish Championship	10	1	0	0	0	0	0	0	10	1
Kilmarnock	2017–18	Scottish Premiership	28	7	4	1	0	0	–		32	8
Kilmarnock	2018–19	Scottish Premiership	29	11	1	0	3	1	–		33	12
Kilmarnock	2019–20	Scottish Premiership	28	9	2	1	2	0	2 (Note: Appearances in the UEFA Europa League.)	1	34	11
Kilmarnock	2020–21	Scottish Premiership	15	2	0	0	2	1	0	0	17	3
Kilmarnock	Total		100	29	7	2	7	2	2	1	116	34
St Mirren (loan)	2020–21	Scottish Premiership	6	0	1	0	1	0	—		8	0
St Mirren	2021–22	Scottish Premiership	31	7	1	1	4	0	—		36	8
St Mirren	2022–23	Scottish Premiership	12	0	1	0	1	0	—		14	0
St Mirren	Total		43	7	2	1	5	0	0	0	50	8
Ross County (loan)	2022–23	Scottish Premiership	8	3	0	0	0	0	—		8	3
Ross County	2023–24	Scottish Premiership	25	3	1	0	2	1	—		28	4
Ross County	2024–25	Scottish Premiership	11	0	0	0	5	1	—		16	1
Ross County	Total		36	3	1	0	7	2	0	0	44	5
Falkirk (loan)	2024–25	Scottish Championship	4	0	0	0	0	0	—		4	0
Greenock Morton	2025–26	Scottish Championship	8	3	0	0	1	0	—		9	3
Career total			290	59	16	3	24	5	3	1	333	68
