= 2016–17 Kilmarnock F.C. season =

Kilmarnock
2016–17 season
- Chairman: Billy Bowie
- Manager: Lee Clark; Lee McCulloch
- Stadium: Rugby Park
- Premiership: Eighth Place
- Scottish Cup: Fourth Round
- League Cup: Group Stage
- Top goalscorer: League: Souleymane Coulibaly (8); All: Souleymane Coulibaly (11)
- Highest home attendance: 11,800 (vs Rangers, 26 August 2016)
- Lowest home attendance: 2,219 (vs Albion Rovers, 30 July 2016)
- Average home league attendance: 5,118
Home colours	Away colours

The 2016–17 season was Kilmarnock's fourth season in the Scottish Premiership and their 24th consecutive appearance in the top flight of Scottish football. Kilmarnock also competed in the Scottish Premiership, Scottish League Cup and the Scottish Cup.

== Overview ==
Kilmarnock finished eighth in the Scottish Premiership with 41 points. They failed to qualify from the group stages of the League Cup, and lost to Hamilton Academical in the fourth round of the Scottish Cup

== Match results ==
=== Friendlies ===
Date	Opponents	H / A	Result F–A	Scorers
9 July 2016	Morpeth Town	H	4–2	M. Smith, Dicker, Coulibaly, Burn
24 July 2016	Auchinleck Talbot	A	3–1	Coulibaly 15', McKenzie 20', Clark 64'
11 January 2017	Gateshead	A	1–1	Roberts 36'
12 January 2017	Newcastle United U23s	A	3–1	Frizzell 25', S. Boyd 35', Hawkshaw 90'

Notes

1. a: Played at Beechwood Park, Auchinleck.

=== Scottish Premiership ===
Date	Opponents	H / A	Result F–A	Scorers	Attendance	League position
6 August 2016	Motherwell	H	1–2	M. Smith 81'	4,308	10th
13 August 2016	Hamilton Academical	A	2–1	K. Boyd 71', Coulibaly 73'	2,228	6th
20 August 2016	Ross County	A	0–2		3,263	10th
26 August 2016	Rangers	H	1–1	K. Boyd 29'	11,800	8th
10 September 2016	Dundee	A	1–1	Coulibaly 32'	5,111	10th
17 September 2016	Partick Thistle	H	2–2	K. Boyd 17', Coulibaly 65'	4,169	8th
24 September 2016	Celtic	A	1–6	Coulibaly 32'	53,532	10th
1 October 2016	Aberdeen	H	0–4		4,592	11th
15 October 2016	St Johnstone	A	1–0	S. Boyd 76'	2,930	9th
22 October 2016	Inverness Calednoian Thistle	A	1–1	Coulibaly 8' (pen.)	2,591	8th
26 October 2016	Heart of Midlothian	H	2–0	Coulibaly 22', S. Smith 72'	3,917	7th
29 October 2016	Rangers	A	0–3		49,302	8th
5 November 2016	Hamilton Academical	H	0–0		3,387	7th
18 November 2016	Celtic	H	0–1		10,962	7th
26 November 2016	Aberdeen	A	Postponed			
3 December 2016	Dundee	H	2–0	McKenzie 22', Coulibaly 70'	3,615	6th
6 December 2016	Aberdeen	A	1–5	McKenzie 77'	8,195	6th
10 December 2016	Motherwell	A	0–0		3,684	6th
17 December 2016	Inverness Caledonian Thistle	H	1–1	Coulibaly 73'	3,294	7th
23 December 2016	St Johnstone	H	0–1		3,056	8th
27 December 2016	Heart of Midlothian	A	0–4		16,696	8th
31 December 2016	Partick Thistle	H	0–0		3,584	10th
28 January 2017	Ross County	H	3–2	K. Boyd 1', Dicker 61', Longstaff 90'	3,207	8th
1 February 2017	Dundee	A	Postponed			
4 February 2017	Hamilton Academical	A	1–1	Longstaff 7'	2,159	8th
11 February 2017	Dundee	A	1–1	K. Boyd 9'	4,708	6th
19 February 2017	Aberdeen	H	1–2	McKenzie 41'	3,972	8th
25 February 2017	St Johnstone	A	2–0	McKenzie 11', Sammon 71'	2,933	8th
4 March 2017	Motherwell	H	1–2	K. Boyd 32'	4,726	8th
11 March 2017	Ross County	A	2–1	Sammon 46', K. Boyd 85'	3,380	7th
18 March 2017	Partick Thistle	H	1–1	Sammon 87'	4,519	7th
1 April 2017	Inverness Caledonian Thistle	A	1–1	K. Boyd 87' (pen.)	2,780	7th
5 April 2017	Rangers	H	0–0		9,548	7th
8 April 2017	Celtic	A	1–3	Jones 65'	57,679	7th
14 April 2017	Heart of Midlothian	H	0–0		4,110	7th
29 April 2017	Hamilton Academical	A	2–0	Sammon 11', Jones 23'	2,482	7th
6 May 2017	Dundee	H	0–1		4,040	8th
13 May 2017	Inverness Caledonian Thistle	H	2–1	Longstaff 17', Jones 57'	3,137	7th
16 May 2017	Motherwell	A	1–3	Frizzell 17'	5,246	8th
20 May 2017	Ross County	H	1–2	Sammon 10'(pen.)	3,951	8th

=== Scottish Cup ===
Date	Round	Opponents	H / A	Result F–A	Scorers	Attendance
21 January 2017	Fourth round	Hamilton Academical	H	0–1		2,944

=== Scottish League Cup ===
Group Stage

Date	Round	Opponents	H / A	Result F–A	Scorers	Attendance
16 July 2016	Group stage	Clyde	A	2–1	Coulibaly 69', Boyle 76'	1,303
23 July 2016	Group stage	Greenock Morton	H	0–2		3,020
26 July 2016	Group stage	Berwick Rangers	A	3–2	Coulibaly 65', 70', McKenzie 85'	609
30 July 2016	Group stage	Albion Rovers	H	0–0 (3–5p)		2,219

== Squad statistics ==
During the 2016–17 season, Kilmarnock used thirty-seven different players in competitive games. The table below shows the number of appearances and goals scored by each player.

No.	Pos.	Name	League		Scottish Cup		League Cup		Total		Discipline	
No.	Pos.	Name	Apps	Goals	Apps	Goals	Apps	Goals	Apps	Goals	Yellow card	Red card
1	GK	(Scotland) Jamie MacDonald	24	0	0	0	2	0	26	0	1	0
2	DF	(England) Josh Webb	1	0	0	0	2	0	3	0	1	0
3	DF	(Scotland) Steven Smith	26	1	1	0	3	0	30	1	5	0
4	DF	(England) Miles Addison	11	0	0	0	4	0	15	0	2	0
5	DF	(England) Karleigh Osborne	1	0	1	0	0	0	2	0	1	0
5	DF	(England) Will Boyle	11	0	0	0	3	1	14	1	6	0
6	MF	(England) Martin Smith	10	1	0	0	2	0	12	1	0	0
7	MF	(Scotland) Rory McKenzie	28	4	1	0	3	1	32	5	6	0
8	MF	(Republic of Ireland) Gary Dicker	36	1	1	0	4	0	41	1	11	0
9	FW	(Scotland) Kris Boyd	27	8	1	0	1	0	29	8	2	0
10	FW	(Scotland) Greg Kiltie	11	0	0	0	2	0	13	0	0	0
11	MF	(Northern Ireland) Jordan Jones	37	3	1	0	4	0	42	3	1	0
12	FW	(England) Nathan Tyson	17	0	0	0	1	0	18	0	1	0
12	GK	(Wales) Oliver Davies	0	0	0	0	2	0	2	0	0	0
13	FW	(England) Josh Umerah	4	0	0	0	0	0	4	0	1	0
14	DF	(Scotland) Callum McFadzean	4	0	0	0	1	0	5	0	0	0
16	MF	(England) Mark Waddington	1	0	0	0	1	0	2	0	0	0
16	DF	(Scotland) Scott Boyd	18	1	1	0	0	0	19	1	4	0
17	DF	(England) Jonny Burn	8	0	0	0	2	0	10	0	2	0
17	GK	(England) Freddie Woodman	14	0	1	0	0	0	15	0	0	0
18	MF	(England) Charlee Adams	9	0	0	0	0	0	9	0	2	0
18	MF	(England) Sean Longstaff	16	3	1	0	0	0	17	3	1	0
19	FW	(Ivory Coast) Souleymane Coulibaly	21	8	1	0	4	3	26	11	2	0
19	FW	(Republic of Ireland) Conor Sammon	15	5	0	0	0	0	15	5	1	0
20	FW	(Albania) Flo Bojaj	2	0	0	0	3	0	5	0	0	0
20	DF	(Norway) Kristoffer Ajer	16	0	1	0	0	0	17	0	2	0
21	MF	(Scotland) Adam Frizzell	15	1	0	0	1	0	16	1	0	0
22	DF	(England) Jamie Cobain	0	0	0	0	1	0	1	0	0	0
24	DF	(Scotland) Greg Taylor	34	0	1	0	3	0	38	0	10	0
25	MF	(England) George Green	4	0	0	0	0	0	4	0	2	0
25	FW	(England) Callum Roberts	10	0	1	0	0	0	11	0	1	0
27	DF	(England) Luke Hendrie	32	0	1	0	0	0	33	0	8	0
28	FW	(Northern Ireland) Josh Magennis	0	0	0	0	4	0	4	0	0	0
33	MF	(Scotland) Dean Hawkshaw	15	0	0	0	0	0	15	0	2	0
35	FW	(Scotland) Lewis Morrison	1	0	0	0	0	0	1	0	0	0
36	MF	(Scotland) Iain Wilson	20	0	0	0	0	0	20	0	4	0
40	FW	(Scotland) Will Graham	3	0	0	0	0	0	3	0	0	0
44	FW	(Scotland) Innes Cameron	2	0	0	0	0	0	2	0	0	0

== Club statistics ==
=== Competition overview ===
Competition	First match	Last match	Starting round	Final position	Record							
Competition	First match	Last match	Starting round	Final position	Pld	W	D	L	GF	GA	GD	Win %
Premiership	6 August 2016	20 May 2017	Matchday 1	Matchday 38	38	9	14	15	36	56	−20	23.68
Scottish Cup	21 January 2017	21 January 2017	Fourth round	Fourth round	1	0	0	1	0	1	−1	0.00
League Cup	16 July 2017	30 July 2017	Group stage	Group stage	4	2	1	1	5	5	+0	50.00
Total					43	11	15	17	41	62	−21	25.58

Source: Competitions

=== League table ===
Pos	Team	Pld	W	D	L	GF	GA	GD	Pts	Qualification or relegation (Note: Teams played each other three times (33 matches), before the league split into two groups (the top six and the bottom six) for the last five matches.)
6	Partick Thistle	38	10	12	16	38	54	−16	42	
7	Ross County	38	11	13	14	48	58	−10	46	
8	Kilmarnock	38	9	14	15	36	56	−20	41	
9	Motherwell	38	10	8	20	46	69	−23	38	
10	Dundee	38	10	7	21	38	62	−24	37	

Source: Scottish Premiership, Soccerway
Rules for classification: 1) Points; 2) Goal difference; 3) Goals scored; 4) Play-off (only if deciding champion, UEFA competitions qualification and second stage group allocation).

=== League cup table ===
Pos	Team	Pld	W	PW	PL	L	GF	GA	GD	Pts	Qualification
1	Morton (Q)	4	3	1	0	0	5	0	+5	11	Qualification for the Second Round
2	Kilmarnock	4	2	0	1	1	5	5	0	7	
3	Clyde	4	1	1	0	2	4	5	−1	5	
4	Albion Rovers	4	0	2	1	1	1	2	−1	5	
5	Berwick Rangers	4	0	0	2	2	3	6	−3	2	

Source: SPFL
(Q) Qualified to the phase indicated

== Player transfers ==
=== Transfers in ===
Date	Position	Name	Previous club	Fee	Ref.
24 June 2016	DF	(England) Josh Webb	(England) Aston Villa	Free	
24 June 2016	MF	(Northern Ireland) Jordan Jones	(England) Middlesbrough	Free	
24 June 2016	DF	(England) Jamie Cobain	(England) Newcastle United	Free	
24 June 2016	FW	(Ivory Coast) Souleymane Coulibaly	(England) Peterborough United	Free	
24 June 2016	DF	Callum McFadzean	(England) Sheffield United	Free	
24 June 2016	MF	(England) Martin Smith	(England) Sunderland	Free	
24 June 2016	FW	(Albania) Flo Bojaj	(England) Huddersfield Town	Loan	
24 June 2016	DF	(England) Will Boyle	(England) Huddersfield Town	Loan	
24 June 2016	DF	(England) Jonny Burn	(England) Middlesbrough	Loan	
24 June 2016	MF	(England) Mark Waddington	(England) Stoke City	Loan	
24 June 2016	GK	(Wales) Oliver Davies	(Wales) Swansea City	Loan	
13 August 2016	MF	(England) George Green	(England) Burnley	Loan	
19 August 2016	MF	(England) Charlee Adams	(England) Birmingham City	Loan	
19 August 2016	DF	(England) Luke Hendrie	(England) Burnley	Loan	
19 August 2016	DF	(Nigeria) Dapo Kayode	(Romania) Dinamo București	Free	
31 August 2016	DF	Scott Boyd	Ross County	Loan	
12 September 2016	FW	(England) Nathan Tyson	Free Agent	Free	
9 January 2017	MF	(England) Sean Longstaff	(England) Newcastle United	Loan	
9 January 2017	FW	(England) Callum Roberts	(England) Newcastle United	Loan	
9 January 2017	GK	(England) Freddie Woodman	(England) Newcastle United	Loan	
16 January 2017	DF	(England) Karleigh Osborne	(England) Plymouth Argyle	Free	
20 January 2017	DF	(Norway) Kristoffer Ajer	Celtic	Loan	
31 January 2017	FW	(England) Josh Umerah	(England) Charlton Athletic	Loan	
31 January 2017	FW	(Republic of Ireland) Conor Sammon	Heart of Midlothian	Loan	
31 January 2017	DF	Scott Boyd	Ross County	Free	

=== Transfers out ===
Date	Position	Name	Subsequent Club	Fee	Ref
23 May 2016	DF	(Republic of Ireland) Mark Connolly	(England) Crawley Town	Free	
23 May 2016	DF	Lee Ashcroft	Dunfermline Athletic	Free	
23 May 2016	MF	(England) Alex Henshall	(England) Margate	Free	
23 May 2016	GK	(Northern Ireland) Conor Brennan	Raith Rovers	Free	
23 May 2016	MF	Chris Johnston	Raith Rovers	Free	
23 May 2016	MF	(Martinique) Julien Faubert	Free Agent	Released	
23 May 2016	MF	Aaron Splaine	Free Agent	Released	
8 June 2016	MF	Mark O'Hara	Dundee	Free	
16 June 2016	DF	David Syme	Partick Thistle	Free	
18 June 2016	DF	Kevin McHattie	Raith Rovers	Free	
1 July 2016	FW	(England) Tope Obadeyi	Dundee United	Free	
7 July 2016	MF	Craig Slater	(England) Colchester United	Undisclosed	
15 July 2016	FW	Dale Carrick	Livingston	Free	
18 July 2016	MF	(England) Kallum Higginbotham	Dunfermline Athletic	Free	
11 August 2016	FW	(Northern Ireland) Josh Magennis	(England) Charlton Athletic	Undisclosed	
30 August 2016	DF	(England) Conrad Balatoni	Ayr United	Free	
13 January 2017	MF	Jack Whittaker	Stranraer	Loan	
24 January 2017	FW	(Ivory Coast) Souleymane Coulibaly	(Egypt) Al Ahly	Undisclosed	
30 January 2017	GK	Devlin McKay	Berwick Rangers	Loan	
17 March 2017	MF	Callum McFadzean	(England) Alfreton Town	Free	
23 March 2017	DF	(England) Josh Webb	(England) Kidderminster Harriers	Free	

== Notes ==
1. Note 1: Clark was appointed manager of Bury on 15 February 2016. McCulloch and Peter Leven were put in temporary charge of the first team before McCulloch was appointed Kilmarnock manager on a permanent basis on 5 June 2017.
