= Martin Smith (footballer, born 1995) =

English footballer

Personal information
- Full name: Martin Smith
- Date of birth: 2 October 1995 (age 31)
- Place of birth: Sunderland, England
- Height: 5 ft 10 in (1.78 m)
- Position: Midfielder

Youth career
- 2012–2014: Sunderland

Senior career*
Years	Team	Apps	(Gls)
2014–2016	Sunderland	0	(0)
2015	→ Gateshead (loan)	1	(0)
2016	→ Carlisle United (loan)	2	(0)
2016–2017	Kilmarnock	10	(1)
2017–2018	Coleraine	23	(1)
2018–2019	Swindon Town	11	(0)
2019–2021	Salford City	8	(0)
2019–2020	→ Chorley (loan)	17	(0)
2021	Chesterfield	11	(0)
2021–2022	Hartlepool United	7	(0)
2022–2026	South Shields	111	(7)
2026	Gateshead	2	(0)
Total		203	(9)
- * Club domestic league appearances and goals

Martin Smith (born 2 October 1995) is an English former footballer who played as a midfielder. He was recently a first-team coach at National League club Gateshead.

== Career ==
Smith began his career with Sunderland and had a loan spell with non-league Gateshead in November 2015. In March 2016 Smith joined League Two side Carlisle United on loan until the end of the 2015–16 season. He made his professional debut on 19 March 2016 in a 1–1 draw against Wycombe Wanderers.

On 24 June 2016, Smith signed for Scottish Premiership club Kilmarnock.

After a season at Kilmarnock, Smith signed for NIFL Premiership club Coleraine. In July 2018, he joined Swindon Town, following a recommendation from assistant manager Neil McDonald, who had been managing in Ireland while Smith was at Coleraine.

He was released by Swindon at the end of the 2018–19 season.

In July 2019 he joined Salford City on a two-year contract. In November he joined Chorley on loan until January 2020. On 11 January 2021, it was announced that Smith had left Salford City by mutual consent.

On 14 January 2021, Smith signed for National League side Chesterfield.

On 16 July 2021, Smith signed for Hartlepool United. Smith was released by Pools at the end of the 2021–22 season. He made 15 appearances in all competitions for the League Two side.

On 1 June 2022, Smith signed for South Shields. In June 2024, his club announced that after a serious fall he had suffered a fractured skull and a bleed on the brain. Smith his made first appearance since his injury four months later after coming on a substitute against Chester. At the end of the 2025–26 season, Smith was released by South Shields.

== Coaching career ==
In July 2026, Smith joined Gateshead as a first-team coach as part of Lee Cattermole's coaching staff. On 4 October 2026, Smith departed the club with Cattermole.

== Career statistics ==
As of match played 21 March 2026

Appearances and goals by club, season and competition
Club	Season	League			Cup (Note: Cup competitions include the FA Cup, Scottish Cup and Irish Cup)		League Cup (Note: League Cup competitions include the League Cup, Scottish League Cup and League of Ireland Cup)		Other		Total	
Club	Season	Division	Apps	Goals	Apps	Goals	Apps	Goals	Apps	Goals	Apps	Goals
Sunderland	2015–16	Premier League	0	0	0	0	0	0	0	0	0	0
Gateshead (loan)	2015–16	National League	1	0	0	0	0	0	1 (Note: Appearances in FA Trophy)	0	2	0
Carlisle United (loan)	2015–16	League Two	2	0	0	0	0	0	0	0	2	0
Kilmarnock	2016–17	Scottish Premiership	10	1	0	0	2	0	0	0	12	1
Coleraine	2017–18	NIFL Premiership	23	1	4	0	0	0	0	0	27	1
Swindon Town	2018–19	League Two	11	0	0	0	1	0	1 (Note: Appearances in EFL Trophy)	0	13	0
Salford City	2019–20	League Two	4	0	0	0	0	0	1	0	5	0
Salford City	2020–21	League Two	4	0	0	0	0	0	3	0	7	0
Salford City	Total		8	0	0	0	0	0	4	0	12	0
Chorley (loan)	2019–20	National League	17	0	1	0	—		1	0	19	0
Chesterfield	2020–21	National League	11	0	—		—		1	0	1	0
Hartlepool United	2021–22	League Two	7	0	1	0	1	0	6	0	15	0
South Shields	2022–23	NPL Premier Division	41	3	5	1	0	0	0	0	46	4
South Shields	2023–24	National League North	38	1	1	0	0	0	0	0	39	1
South Shields	2024–25	National League North	21	3	1	0	0	0	1	0	23	3
South Shields	2025–26	National League North	11	0	0	0	0	0	0	0	11	0
South Shields	Total		111	5	7	1	0	0	1	0	119	8
Career total			201	9	13	1	4	0	15	0	233	10

== Honours ==
Coleraine

- Irish Cup: 2017-18

South Shields

- Northern Premier League: 2022–23
