= Josh Webb (footballer) =

English footballer

Personal information
- Full name: Joshua Webb
- Date of birth: 10 August 1995 (age 31)
- Place of birth: Halesowen, England
- Position: Defender

Team information
- Current team: Hednesford Town

Youth career
- 2005–2016: Aston Villa

Senior career*
Years	Team	Apps	(Gls)
2016–2017	Kilmarnock	1	(0)
2017–2018	Kidderminster Harriers	3	(0)
2018–2021	Coleshill Town	55	(2)
2021–	Hednesford Town	0	(0)

International career^{‡}
2011	England U17	5	(0)
2013	England U18	1	(0)
- * Club domestic league appearances and goals as of 19:00, 23 June 2021 (UTC) ‡ National team caps and goals as of 19:00, 23 June 2021 (UTC)

Joshua Webb (born 10 August 1995) is an English footballer who plays for Hednesford Town, as a defender. He started his career with Aston Villa's youth sides, before moving to Scottish Premiership club Kilmarnock in 2016.

== Career ==
=== Domestic ===
Webb, began his career in 2005 with Aston Villa, playing with the club's youth squads up until U23s.

In July 2016, Webb was one of 11 players to be signed by Kilmarnock manager Lee Clark. His first appearances came for the club in July 2016, in the Scottish League Cup against Greenock Morton and Albion Rovers. Webb's next appearance for the side wasn't until December 2016, where he was a second-half substitute in the 4–0 loss to Heart of Midlothian.

Webb was released by Kilmarnock and signed for Kidderminster Harriers in March 2017. In 2021 he signed for Hednesford Town.

=== International ===
Webb began his international career in 2001 playing for England U17s in a number of UEFA U17 Championship matches, including against Ukraine U17s and the Netherlands U17s. He subsequently went on to make one appearance for England U18s, against Belgium U18 in 2013.

== Career statistics ==
As of match played 9 December 2017

Appearances and goals by club, season and competition
Club	Season	League			FA Cup		League Cup		Other		Total	
Club	Season	Division	Apps	Goals	Apps	Goals	Apps	Goals	Apps	Goals	Apps	Goals
Kilmarnock	2016–17	Scottish Premiership	1	0	0	0	2	0	0	0	3	0
Kidderminster Harriers	2017–18	National League North	3	0	0	0	—		0	0	3	0
Career total			4	0	0	0	2	0	0	0	6	0
