= Alex Samizadeh =

Iranian professional footballer (born 1998)

Personal information
- Full name: Alexander Samizadeh
- Date of birth: 10 November 1998 (age 28)
- Place of birth: Tehran, Iran
- Height: 1.68 m (5 ft 6 in)
- Position: Forward

Youth career
- 2014–2015: Curzon Ashton
- 2015: → Manchester City (loan)
- 2015–2017: Bolton Wanderers

Senior career*
Years	Team	Apps	(Gls)
2016–2017	Bolton Wanderers	1	(0)
2016	→ Chorley (loan)	2	(2)
2017–2018	Kilmarnock	1	(0)
2018	Curzon Ashton	8	(0)
2018	Wealdstone	1	(0)
2019	Burgess Hill Town	2	(0)
2020	Colne	1	(0)
2021	Leatherhead	12	(7)
2022	Altrincham	0	(0)
2022-2023	Hyde	1	(0)
- * Club domestic league appearances and goals as of 18:00, 18 May 2023 (UTC)

Alexander Samizadeh (Persian: الکس سمیع زاده; born 10 November 1998) is an Iranian professional footballer who plays as a forward. He most recently played for Hyde. He has previously played for Bolton Wanderers, Chorley, Kilmarnock and Altrincham.

== Early life ==
Alexander Samizadeh was born in Iran and moved to England in December 2013.

== Club career ==
=== Bolton Wanderers ===
Samizadeh started his career with Bolton Wanderers, progressing through their youth teams. He made his first team debut on 5 April 2016, coming on as a substitute for Kaiyne Woolery at Brentford in the Football League Championship.

=== Chorley ===
In November 2016, Samizadeh joined National League North side Chorley on a two-month work experience loan. He scored on his debut.

=== Kilmarnock ===
On 14 July 2017, Bolton announced that Samizadeh had been released and that he was joining Scottish Premiership side Kilmarnock. Samizadeh made his first appearance for the club on the same day, coming on as a second-half substitute in a Scottish League Cup match. Samizadeh was released by Kilmarnock in May 2018, at the end of his contract.

=== Curzon Ashton ===
On 14 August 2018, Samizadeh signed for Curzon Ashton and made his debut that night coming off the bench against Alfreton Town.

=== Wealdstone ===
Samizadeh signed for Wealdstone in December 2018 and played two matches.

=== Burgess Hill Town ===
In January 2019 he signed for Burgess Hill Town, scoring on his debut for the club.

=== Colne ===
He signed for Colne on 12 September 2020.

=== Leatherhead ===
In August 2021 Samizadeh signed for Leatherhead and scored a hat-trick on his debut for the club.

=== Altrincham ===
In July 2022 Samizadeh signed for Altrincham after a successful trial period with the club. In October 2022, it was announced he had left the club.

== Career statistics ==
As of match played 21 September 2021

Appearances and goals by club, season and competition
Club	Season	League			National Cup		League Cup		Other		Continental		Total	
Club	Season	Division	Apps	Goals	Apps	Goals	Apps	Goals	Apps	Goals	Apps	Goals	Apps	Goals
Bolton Wanderers	2015–16	Championship	1	0	0	0	0	0	–		–		1	0
Bolton Wanderers	2016–17	League One	0	0	0	0	0	0	1 (Note: Appearance in the EFL Trophy)	0	–		1	0
Bolton Wanderers	Total		1	0	0	0	0	0	1	0	0	0	2	0
Chorley (loan)	2016–17	National League North	2	2	0	0	–		0	0	–		2	2
Kilmarnock	2017–18	Scottish Premiership	1	0	0	0	2	0	1 (Note: Appearance for Kilmarnock under-20s in the Scottish Challenge Cup)	0	–		4	0
Curzon Ashton	2018–19	National League North	8	0	0	0	–		0	0	–		8	0
Wealdstone	2018–19	National League South	1	0	0	0	–		1 (Note: Appearance in the FA Trophy)	0	–		2	0
Burgess Hill Town	2018–19	Isthmian Premier Division	2	0	0	0	–		1 (Note: Appearance in the Alan Turvey Trophy)	1	–		3	1
Colne	2020–21	Northern Premier League	1	0	2	1	–		0	0	–		3	1
Leatherhead	2021–22	Isthmian Premier Division	4	5	4	1	–		0	0	–		8	6
Career total			20	7	6	2	2	0	4	0	0	0	32	10
