= 2021–22 Kilmarnock F.C. season =

Kilmarnock
2021–22 season
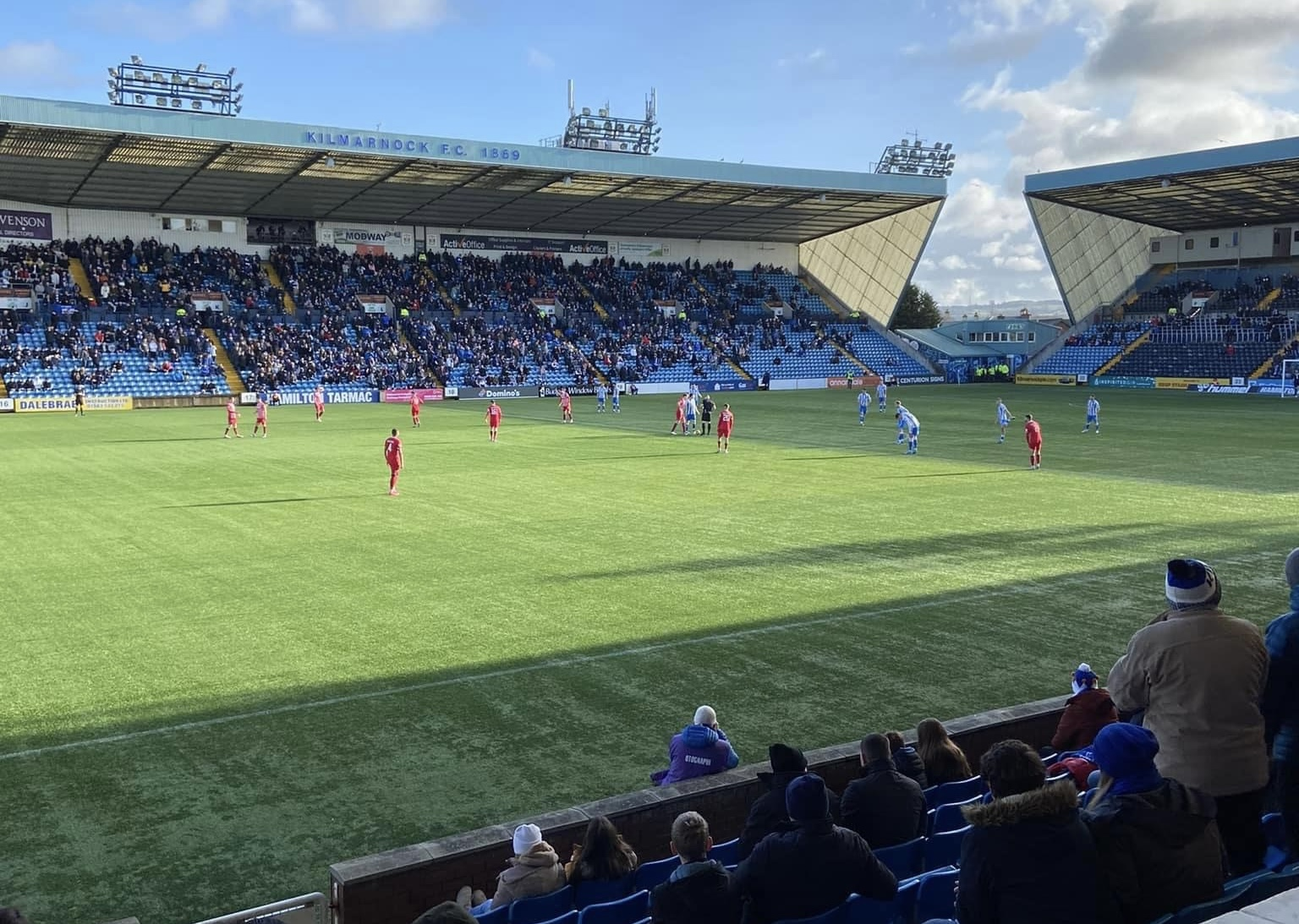
- Kilmarnock . Raith Rovers at Rugby Park, 19 February 2022
- Chairman: Billy Bowie
- Manager: Tommy Wright (until 18 December); Derek McInnes (from 4 January)
- Stadium: Rugby Park
- Championship: 1st (promoted)
- Scottish Cup: Fourth round
- League Cup: Second round
- Challenge Cup: Semi-final
- Top goalscorer: League: Oli Shaw (14); All: Oli Shaw (16)
- Highest home attendance: 11,500 vs. Arbroath, Championship, 22 April 2022
- Lowest home attendance: 500 vs. Greenock Morton, Championship, 29 December 2021
- Average home league attendance: 4,664
Home colours	Away colours	Third colours

The 2021–22 season is the 143rd season of competitive association football and ninth season in the Scottish Professional Football League played by Kilmarnock Football Club, a professional football club based in Kilmarnock, Ayrshire, Scotland. Their 11th-place finish and play-off defeat in 2020–21 meant it was their first season in the Championship and their first in the second tier of Scottish football since 1992–93. The 2020–21 season ran from 1 July 2021 to 30 June 2022.

Tommy Wright made 14 permanent summer signings as he approached his first full season as Kilmarnock manager. In December 2021, Wright was sacked with Kilmarnock fifth in the table, following three consecutive league defeats. He was replaced by former Aberdeen manager Derek McInnes in January 2022. Following an upturn in form, Kilmarnock climbed the table and earned promotion back to the Premiership at the first time of asking after claiming the league title following a 2–1 comeback win against nearest challengers Arbroath in their penultimate match. It was their first second tier title since 1898–99.

In cup competition, Kilmarnock were eliminated in the fourth round of the Scottish Cup, in the second round of the League Cup and the semifinals of the Challenge Cup.

In total, 36 players made at least one appearance in nationally organised first-team competition and there have been 18 different goalscorers. Midfielder Fraser Murray missed only five of the 47 first-team matches over the season. Oli Shaw was the leading scorer with 16 goals, of which 14 came in league competition and two came in the Challenge Cup.

== Overview ==
Tommy Wright signed a two-year contract in February 2021 to become the Kilmarnock manager.

In the League Cup, Kilmarnock were drawn in Group G alongside East Kilbride, Clyde, Greenock Morton and Stranraer. The competition is scheduled to start on 10 July 2021.

On 18 December 2021, Tommy Wright was sacked from his position as manager with the club slipping to fourth in the championship table.

On 4 January 2022, former Aberdeen manager Derek McInnes was appointed as the club's new manager on an 18-month contract.

== Results and fixtures ==
=== Pre-season ===
Date	Opponents	H / A	Result F–A	Scorers
30 June 2021	Linfield	A	1–0	Cameron 23'
3 July 2021	Larne	A	2–2	Cameron 9' (pen.), F. Murray 20'

=== Scottish Championship ===
Date	Opponents	H / A	Result F–A	Scorers	Attendance	League position
2 August 2021	Ayr United	H	2–0	Polworth 56', Cameron 86' (pen.)	3,692	1st
7 August 2021	Queen of the South	A	1–0	Naismith 90+1'	1,195	2nd
21 August 2021	Hamilton Academical	A	2–0	Robinson 60', 70'	2,595	1st
28 August 2021	Inverness Caledonian Thistle	H	0–1		5,004	3rd
11 September 2021	Greenock Morton	H	1–0	McKenzie 75'	4,189	2nd
18 September 2021	Partick Thistle	A	2–0	Holt 52' (o.g.), Shaw 65'	4,315	2nd
24 September 2021	Arbroath	A	0–0		2,410	1st
2 October 2021	Raith Rovers	H	1–3	Hendry 76'	4,008	2nd
16 October 2021	Dunfermline Athletic	A	2–2	Hendry 68', Shaw 75'	4,095	3rd
23 October 2021	Hamilton Academical	H	2–1	Shaw 5', Armstrong 74'	3,969	2nd
26 October 2021	Ayr United	A	1–0	Shaw 89' (pen.)	6,052	1st
30 October 2021	Queen of the South	H	4–0	Shaw 17', 59', Hendry 90', Burke 90+2'	3,992	1st
6 November 2021	Partick Thistle	H	0–1		4,560	1st
13 November 2021	Greenock Morton	A	2–0	Alston 34', Shaw 43'	2,878	1st
20 November 2021	Arbroath	H	0–1		4,242	1st
3 December 2021	Inverness Caledonian Thistle	A	0–1		2,296	3rd
11 December 2021	Raith Rovers	A	0–1		2,426	4th
18 December 2021	Dunfermline Athletic	H	A–A	Shaw 3' (pen.)		5th
26 December 2021	Hamilton Academical	A	3–2	Hendry 8' (pen.), Stokes 35', F. Murray 54'	500	4th
29 December 2021	Greenock Morton	H	1–1	McKenzie 27'	500	3rd
8 January 2022	Queen of the South	A	2–0	Stokes 43', Shaw 71' (pen.)	492	3rd
14 January 2022	Partick Thistle	A	1–1	Shaw 59' (pen.)	500	2nd
29 January 2022	Inverness Caledonian Thistle	H	1–0	Lafferty 9'	4,790	2nd
4 February 2022	Arbroath	A	0–1		2,803	2nd
9 February 2022	Ayr United	H	1–2	F. Murray 7'	7,560	2nd
12 February 2022	Dunfermline Athletic	H	2–1	Lafferty 67', 83'	3,698	2nd
19 February 2022	Raith Rovers	H	3–0	McGinn 5', Lafferty 12', 63'	4,080	2nd
26 February 2022	Dunfermline Athletic	A	0–0		4,083	2nd
5 March 2022	Hamilton Academical	H	2–0	F. Murray 44', Alston 55'	4,083	2nd
11 March 2022	Ayr United	A	3–1	McKenzie 3', Shaw 12', Sanders 16'	6,136	1st
19 March 2022	Queen of the South	H	2–1	Taylor 42', Shaw 81'	4,074	1st
26 March 2022	Partick Thistle	H	2–1	Lafferty 22', 46'	5,003	1st
1 April 2022	Greenock Morton	A	1–1	Shaw 64' (pen.)	2,650	1st
9 April 2022	Dunfermline Athletic	H	2–0	Lafferty 26', Shaw 76'	5,013	1st
15 April 2022	Inverness Caledonian Thistle	A	1–2	Taylor 60'	3,829	1st
22 April 2022	Arbroath	H	2–1	Taylor 78', Alston 90'	11,500	1st
29 April 2022	Raith Rovers	A	1–1	Shaw 50'	3,417	1st

Notes

1. A: Attendance restricted due to the COVID-19 pandemic in Scotland.
2. B: Match abandoned due to fog after 63 minutes with the score at 1–1.

=== Scottish Cup ===
Date	Round	Opponents	H / A	Result F–A	Scorers	Attendance
27 November 2021	Third round	Queen's Park	A	1–0	E. Murray 45+1'	1,153
22 January 2022	Fourth round	Dundee United	H	1–2 (a.e.t.)	McKenzie 20'	5,380

=== Scottish League Cup ===
Date	Round	Opponents	H / A	Result F–A	Scorers	Attendance
10 July 2021	Group stage	East Kilbride	A	0–3	F. Murray 49', Naismith 62'	270
17 July 2021	Group stage	Clyde	A	2–1	Alston 1', Cameron 19' (pen.)	500
20 July 2021	Group stage	Greenock Morton	H	1–1 (4–3p)	Connell 90+1'	2,000
24 July 2021	Group stage	Stranraer	H	2–1	F. Murray 38', Burke 66'	2,000
14 August 2021	Second round	Hibernian	A	0–2		5,990

Notes

1. C: East Kilbride were awarded a technical 3−0 win over Kilmarnock, who fielded an ineligible player. The match had originally finished 2–0 to Kilmarnock.

=== Scottish Challenge Cup ===
Date	Round	Opponents	H / A	Result F–A	Scorers	Attendance
4 September 2021	Second round	Falkirk	H	3–1	F. Murray 4', 78', Naismith 55'	2,447
8 October 2021	Third round	Queen's Park	H	3–1	Shaw 14', E. Murray 53', Hendry 61'	2,149
30 November 2021	Quarter-final	Hamilton Academical	A	3–2	Armstrong 53', Sanders 89', 90+4'	829
2 March 2022	Semi-final	Raith Rovers	H	1–2	Shaw 43' (pen.)	2,118

== Squad statistics ==
As of matches played on 29 April 2022

No.	Pos.	Name	Championship		Scottish Cup		League Cup		Challenge Cup		Total		Discipline	
No.	Pos.	Name	Apps	Goals	Apps	Goals	Apps	Goals	Apps	Goals	Apps	Goals	Yellow card	Red card
1	GK	(England) Zach Hemming	36	0	1	0	2	0	0	0	39	0	0	1
2	DF	(Northern Ireland) Lee Hodson	18	0	1	0	0	0	2	0	20	0	2	0
3	DF	(England) Brandon Haunstrup	17	0	1	0	5	0	1	0	24	0	2	0
4	MF	(Scotland) Stephen McGinn	33	1	0	0	5	0	3	0	41	1	4	0
5	DF	(Scotland) Euan Murray	27	0	1	1	5	0	3	1	36	2	4	0
6	DF	(England) Chris Stokes	19	2	1	0	5	0	2	0	28	2	2	0
7	MF	(Scotland) Rory McKenzie	27	3	2	1	4	0	3	0	36	4	6	0
8	MF	(Scotland) Blair Alston	31	3	1	0	5	1	3	0	39	4	5	0
9	FW	(Scotland) Oli Shaw	29	14	2	0	0	0	4	2	35	16	1	0
10	FW	(Scotland) Scott Robinson	16	2	1	0	1	0	2	0	20	2	1	0
11	MF	(Scotland) Daniel Armstrong	15	1	1	0	4	0	4	1	24	2	3	0
12	GK	(England) Sam Walker	1	0	1	0	3	0	4	0	8	0	0	0
14	DF	(England) Jack Sanders	14	1	2	0	2	0	2	2	20	3	1	1
15	MF	(Scotland) Fraser Murray	34	3	1	0	4	2	3	2	42	7	0	0
16	FW	(Scotland) Callum Hendry	13	4	0	0	0	0	2	1	15	5	3	0
16	MF	(Scotland) Declan Glass	6	0	0	0	0	0	1	0	7	0	0	0
17	MF	(Northern Ireland) Brad Lyons	19	0	1	0	5	0	3	0	28	0	4	0
18	DF	(Scotland) Calum Waters	16	0	1	0	0	0	3	0	19	0	2	0
19	MF	(Scotland) Liam Polworth	14	1	2	0	3	0	1	0	20	1	3	0
20	FW	(Scotland) Innes Cameron	6	1	0	0	5	1	1	0	12	2	1	0
20	MF	(Scotland) Dean Campbell	8	0	0	0	0	0	0	0	8	0	0	0
21	GK	(Republic of Ireland) Colin Doyle	0	0	0	0	0	0	0	0	0	0	0	0
22	DF	(Scotland) Jason Naismith	16	1	0	0	5	1	2	1	23	3	1	0
23	FW	(England) Rumarn Burrell	6	0	1	0	0	0	2	0	8	0	0	0
24	DF	(Australia) Dylan McGowan	20	0	1	0	2	0	0	0	22	0	4	0
25	FW	(Scotland) Kyle Connell	0	0	0	0	3	1	0	0	3	1	1	0
27	MF	(Scotland) Steven Warnock	1	0	0	0	0	0	3	0	4	0	0	0
28	FW	(Northern Ireland) Kyle Lafferty	14	8	1	0	0	0	0	0	15	8	2	0
28	MF	(Scotland) Ross Smith	0	0	0	0	1	0	0	0	1	0	0	0
29	MF	(Scotland) Chris Burke	28	1	2	0	5	1	2	0	37	2	1	0
30	MF	(Scotland) Daniel MacKay	10	0	0	0	0	0	1	0	11	0	1	0
32	MF	(Scotland) Thomas Brindley	0	0	0	0	0	0	1	0	1	0	0	0
33	MF	(Scotland) Charlie McArthur	1	0	0	0	0	0	3	0	4	0	0	0
44	MF	(Scotland) David Watson	0	0	0	0	0	0	1	0	1	0	0	0
48	MF	(Scotland) Dylan Tait	7	0	1	0	0	0	0	0	8	0	1	0
55	DF	(Wales) Ash Taylor	11	3	1	0	0	0	0	0	12	3	2	0

== Club statistics ==
=== Competition overview ===
Competition	First match	Last match	Record							
Competition	First match	Last match	Pld	W	D	L	GF	GA	GD	Win %
Championship	2 August 2021	29 April 2022	36	20	7	9	50	27	+23	55.56
Scottish Cup	27 November 2021	22 January 2022	2	1	0	1	2	2	+0	50.00
League Cup	10 July 2021	15 August 2021	5	2	1	2	5	8	−3	40.00
Challenge Cup	4 September 2021	2 March 2022	4	3	0	1	10	6	+4	75.00
Total			47	26	8	13	67	43	+24	55.32

Source: Competitions

=== League table ===
Pos	Team	Pld	W	D	L	GF	GA	GD	Pts	Promotion, qualification or relegation
1	Kilmarnock (C, P)	36	20	7	9	50	27	+23	67	Promotion to the Premiership
2	Arbroath	36	17	14	5	54	28	+26	65	Qualification for the Premiership play-off semi-final
3	Inverness Caledonian Thistle	36	16	11	9	53	34	+19	59	Qualification for the Premiership play-off quarter-final
4	Partick Thistle	36	14	10	12	46	40	+6	52	Qualification for the Premiership play-off quarter-final
5	Raith Rovers	36	12	14	10	44	44	0	50	

Rules for classification: 1) Points; 2) Goal difference; 3) Goals scored; 4) Head-to-to head points; 5) Head-to-head goal difference; 6) Play-off (only for deciding promotion, play-off participation and relegation).
(C) Champions; (P) Promoted

=== League Cup table ===
Pos	Team	Pld	W	PW	PL	L	GF	GA	GD	Pts	Qualification	KIL	STR	GMO	EKI	CLY
1	Kilmarnock	4	2	1	0	1	5	6	−1	8	Qualification for the second round	—	2–1	p1–1	—	—
2	Stranraer	4	2	0	0	2	5	3	+2	6		—	—	3–0 (Note: Stranraer were awarded a technical 3−0 win over Greenock Morton, who were unable to raise a team after a COVID-19 outbreak among players and staff.)	1–0	—
3	Greenock Morton	4	1	1	1	1	3	5	−2	6		—	—	—	p0–0	2–1
4	East Kilbride	4	1	0	2	1	5	3	+2	5		3–0 (Note: East Kilbride were awarded a technical 3−0 win over Kilmarnock, who fielded an ineligible player. The match had originally finished 2–0 to Kilmarnock.)	—	—	—	2–2p
5	Clyde	4	1	1	0	2	5	6	−1	5		1–2	1–0	—	—	—

Rules for classification: 1) goal difference, 2) goals scored, 3) away goals scored, 4) matches won, 5) away matches won, 6) drawing of lots.

== Transfers ==
=== Transfers in ===
Date	Position	Name	Previous club	Fee	Ref.
1 June 2021	DF	Euan Murray	Dunfermline Athletic	Free	
2 June 2021	MF	Daniel Armstrong	Raith Rovers	Free	
3 June 2021	MF	Blair Alston	Falkirk	Free	
3 June 2021	MF	Scott Robinson	Livingston	Free	
3 June 2021	DF	(England) Jack Sanders	(England) Wigan Athletic	Free	
7 June 2021	MF	Stephen McGinn	Hibernian	Free	
10 June 2021	DF	(England) Chris Stokes	(England) Forest Green Rovers	Free	
16 June 2021	GK	(Republic of Ireland) Colin Doyle	Heart of Midlothian	Free	
17 June 2021	MF	(Northern Ireland) Brad Lyons	(England) Blackburn Rovers	Free	
17 June 2021	MF	Fraser Murray	Hibernian	Undisclosed	
17 June 2021	MF	Jason Naismith	Ross County	Free	
20 June 2021	GK	(England) Zach Hemming	(England) Middlesbrough	Loan	
23 June 2021	MF	Liam Polworth	Motherwell	Free	
6 July 2021	GK	(England) Sam Walker	(England) Reading	Free	
14 July 2021	DF	(Australia) Dylan McGowan	(Australia) Western Sydney Wanderers	Free	
30 July 2021	FW	(England) Rumarn Burrell	(England) Middlesbrough	Loan	
31 August 2021	FW	Oli Shaw	Ross County	Undisclosed	
3 September 2021	DF	(Northern Ireland) Lee Hodson	(England) Gillingham	Free	
29 September 2021	FW	Callum Hendry	St Johnstone	Loan	
13 January 2022	MF	Daniel MacKay	Hibernian	Loan	
14 January 2022	DF	(Wales) Ash Taylor	(England) Walsall	Free	
20 January 2022	MF	Dylan Tait	Hibernian	Loan	
21 January 2022	FW	(Northern Ireland) Kyle Lafferty	(Cyprus) Anorthosis Famagusta	Free	
2 February 2022	MF	Declan Glass	Dundee United	Loan	
3 February 2022	MF	Dean Campbell	Aberdeen	Loan	

=== Transfers out ===
Date	Position	Name	Subsequent Club	Fee	Ref
25 May 2021	MF	(France) Diaguely Dabo	Free Agent	Free	
25 May 2021	MF	(Republic of Ireland) Gary Dicker	(England) Brighton & Hove Albion	Free	
25 May 2021	DF	(Republic of the Congo) Clévid Dikamona	(France) Caen	Free	
25 May 2021	MF	(Democratic Republic of the Congo) Youssouf Mulumbu	(Democratic Republic of the Congo) Saint-Éloi Lupopo	Free	
25 May 2021	FW	(England) George Oakley	(England) Woking	Free	
25 May 2021	FW	(England) Nicke Kabamba	(England) Northampton Town	Free	
25 May 2021	GK	(Republic of Ireland) Danny Rogers	(England) Oldham Athletic	Free	
25 May 2021	MF	Ally Taylor	Free Agent	Free	
25 May 2021	MF	(Democratic Republic of the Congo) Aaron Tshibola	(Turkey) Gençlerbirliği	Free	
25 May 2021	FW	(England) Danny Whitehall	(England) Eastleigh	Free	
1 June 2021	DF	Ross Millen	(England) Scunthorpe United	Free	
4 June 2021	DF	Kirk Broadfoot	Inverness Caledonian Thistle	Free	
4 June 2021	MF	Greg Kiltie	St Mirren	Free	
4 June 2021	FW	(Northern Ireland) Kyle Lafferty	(Cyprus) Anorthosis Famagusta	Free	
4 June 2021	FW	(England) Mitchell Pinnock	(England) Northampton Town	Free	
21 June 2021	MF	(Republic of Ireland) Alan Power	St Mirren	Undisclosed	
7 July 2021	GK	Curtis Lyle	Stranraer	Loan	
12 July 2021	DF	(England) Aaron McGowan	(England) Northampton Town	Free	
13 July 2021	DF	Kirk McNight	Dumbarton	Loan	
7 August 2021	FW	Kyle Connell	East Fife	Loan	
17 September 2021	DF	(Northern Ireland) Euan Deveney	Clyde	Loan	
30 September 2021	FW	Innes Cameron	Queen of the South	Loan	
31 January 2022	MF	Tomas Brindley	Forfar Athletic	Loan	
31 January 2022	FW	Innes Cameron	Queen of the South	Loan	
31 January 2022	MF	Steven Warnock	Forfar Athletic	Loan	
28 February 2022	MF	Liam Polworth	Dunfermline Athletic	Loan	
