= List of Scottish football transfers winter 2020–21 =

This is a list of Scottish football transfers featuring at least one 2020–21 Scottish Premiership club or one 2020–21 Scottish Championship club which were completed after the summer 2020 transfer window closed and before the end of the 2020–21 season. Due to the effects of the coronavirus pandemic on the football calendar, the summer window for transfers in Scotland ran until 5 October. Clubs outside the Premiership were permitted to make loan signings during October 2020.

Following the end of the Brexit transition period on 31 December 2020 Scottish clubs were permitted to continue signing players from the European Union during the January 2021 window, as long as they met the criteria of an appeals panel.

== List ==
Date	Name	Moving from	Moving to	Fee
6 October 2020	Stephen Kingsley	Hull City	Heart of Midlothian	Free
6 October 2020	Lyall Cameron	Dundee	Peterhead	Loan
7 October 2020	Osman Sow	Dundee United	Dundee	Free
7 October 2020	Aaron Chapman	Peterborough United	Motherwell	Free
7 October 2020	Stefan Scougall	Carlisle United	Alloa Athletic	Free
7 October 2020	Blair Spittal	Ross County	Partick Thistle	Loan
9 October 2020	Raffaele De Vita	Livingston	Edinburgh City	Loan
9 October 2020	Harrison Sharp	Dundee	Edinburgh City	Loan
12 October 2020	Sam Fisher	Dundee	Forfar Athletic	Loan
14 October 2020	Ben Garuccio	Heart of Midlothian	Melbourne City	Free
15 October 2020	Gabby McGill	Dunfermline Athletic	Edinburgh City	Loan
16 October 2020	Florent Hoti	Dundee United	Forfar Athletic	Loan
16 October 2020	Michael Cunningham	Dundee	Edinburgh City	Loan
18 October 2020	Chris Mochrie	Dundee United	Montrose	Loan
18 October 2020	P. J. Morrison	Motherwell	Falkirk	Loan
21 October 2020	Oliver Bozanic	Heart of Midlothian	Central Coast Mariners	Free
22 October 2020	Cammy Smith	Dundee United	Ayr United	Loan
23 October 2020	Innes Cameron	Kilmarnock	Ayr United	Loan
23 October 2020	Euan Deveney	Kilmarnock	Falkirk	Loan
27 October 2020	Lars Lokotsch	Livingston	Raith Rovers	Loan
28 October 2020	Jordan Archer	Fulham	Motherwell	Free
28 October 2020	Sean Kelly	Ross County	Falkirk	Free
29 October 2020	Paddy Martin	Hibernian	Stenhousemuir	Loan
30 October 2020	Harry Cochrane	Heart of Midlothian	Montrose	Loan
31 October 2020	Cammy Palmer	Rangers	Clyde	Loan
3 November 2020	Jake Doyle-Hayes	Aston Villa	St Mirren	Free
7 November 2020	Aaron Martin	Exeter City	Hamilton Academical	Free
7 November 2020	Nathan Thomas	Sheffield United	Hamilton Academical	Free
8 November 2020	Graham Dorrans	Dundee	Western Sydney Wanderers	Free
13 November 2020	Adam Legzdins	Burnley	Dundee	Free
20 November 2020	Liam Fontaine	Ross County	Dundee	Free
1 December 2020	Michael O'Connor	Ross County	Shelbourne	Free
8 December 2020	Jason Naismith	Peterborough United	Ross County	Free
10 December 2020	Ryan Shanley	Hibernian	Kelty Hearts	Loan
31 December 2020	Diaguely Dabo	Stevenage	Kilmarnock	Free
4 January 2021	James Brown	Millwall	St Johnstone	Loan
5 January 2021	Jordan Archer	Motherwell	Middlesbrough	Free
5 January 2021	Gavin Reilly	Carlisle United	Livingston	Free
6 January 2021	Liam Kelly	Queens Park Rangers	Motherwell	Loan
6 January 2021	Junior Morias	St Mirren	Boreham Wood	Loan
7 January 2021	Rhys Breen	Rangers	Queen of the South	Loan
7 January 2021	Tony Andreu	St Mirren	Ross County	Free
7 January 2021	Corrie Ndaba	Ipswich Town	Ayr United	Loan
7 January 2021	Cammy Logan	Heart of Midlothian	Cove Rangers	Loan
7 January 2021	Connor Smith	Heart of Midlothian	Cove Rangers	Loan
8 January 2021	Matt Macey	Arsenal	Hibernian	Free
8 January 2021	Mohamed Maouche	Oldham Athletic	Ross County	Free
8 January 2021	Collin Quaner	Huddersfield Town	St Mirren	Free
8 January 2021	Eamonn Brophy	Kilmarnock	St Mirren	Loan
8 January 2021	Kai Kennedy	Rangers	Raith Rovers	Loan
8 January 2021	Josh McPake	Rangers	Harrogate Town	Loan
8 January 2021	Gary Mackay-Steven	New York City FC	Heart of Midlothian	Free
8 January 2021	Jaze Kabia	Shelbourne	Livingston	Free
8 January 2021	Jake Davidson	Dundee United	Arbroath	Loan
12 January 2021	Jackson Irvine	Hull City	Hibernian	Free
13 January 2021	Ben Williamson	Dundee United	Arbroath	Loan
14 January 2021	Tomas Cerny	Aberdeen	Retired	Free
14 January 2021	Kyle MacDonald	Airdrieonians	Dunfermline Athletic	Undisclosed
15 January 2021	Steven Lawless	Burton Albion	Motherwell	Free
15 January 2021	Olly Lee	Heart of Midlothian	Gillingham	Loan
15 January 2021	Chris Cadden	Columbus Crew	Hibernian	Undisclosed
16 January 2021	Jordan Wright	Nottingham Forest	Alloa Athletic	Loan
18 January 2021	Tom James	Hibernian	Salford City	Loan
19 January 2021	Jackson Longridge	Bradford City	Livingston	Free
20 January 2021	Cammy Smith	Dundee United	Ayr United	Free
21 January 2021	Dapo Mebude	Rangers	Queen of the South	Loan
21 January 2021	Harry Smith	Northampton Town	Motherwell	Loan
22 January 2021	Leo Hjelde	Celtic	Ross County	Loan
25 January 2021	Scott Banks	Crystal Palace	Dunfermline Athletic	Loan
25 January 2021	Glenn Middleton	Rangers	St Johnstone	Loan
25 January 2021	Andre Wright	Bohemians	Ayr United	Free
25 January 2021	Armand Gnanduillet	Altay	Heart of Midlothian	Free
26 January 2021	Paul McMullan	Dundee United	Dundee	Loan
26 January 2021	George Oakley	Pirin Blagoevgrad	Kilmarnock	Free
27 January 2021	Jeremie Frimpong	Celtic	Bayer Leverkusen	£11,500,000
27 January 2021	Joe Hilton	Blackburn Rovers	Ross County	Loan
27 January 2021	Cammy Palmer	Rangers	Linfield	Free
28 January 2021	Jordan White	Motherwell	Ross County	Free
28 January 2021	Josh Reid	Ross County	Coventry City	Undisclosed
28 January 2021	Funso Ojo	Aberdeen	Wigan Athletic	Loan
28 January 2021	Jason Cummings	Shrewsbury Town	Dundee	Free
28 January 2021	Malachi Fagan-Walcott	Tottenham Hotspur	Dundee	Loan
28 January 2021	Innes Cameron	Kilmarnock	Alloa Athletic	Loan
29 January 2021	Jim McAlister	Greenock Morton	Retired	Free
29 January 2021	Jack Hamilton	Livingston	Arbroath	Loan
29 January 2021	Sam Foley	St Mirren	Motherwell	Free
29 January 2021	Jordan Jones	Rangers	Sunderland	Loan
29 January 2021	Timmy Abraham	Fulham	Raith Rovers	Loan
29 January 2021	Adam King	Dundee United	Raith Rovers	Loan
29 January 2021	Declan McDaid	Dundee	Partick Thistle	Loan
29 January 2021	Isaiah Jones	Middlesbrough	Queen of the South	Loan
30 January 2021	Scott Robertson	Celtic	Doncaster Rovers	Loan
30 January 2021	Barry Coffey	Celtic	Cliftonville	Loan
31 January 2021	Sam Cosgrove	Aberdeen	Birmingham City	£2,000,000
31 January 2021	Ross Stewart	Ross County	Sunderland	£300,000
1 February 2021	Robbie Crawford	Livingston	Motherwell	Free
1 February 2021	Gervane Kastaneer	Coventry City	Heart of Midlothian	Loan
1 February 2021	Stevie Mallan	Hibernian	Yeni Malatyaspor	Loan
1 February 2021	Charlie Gilmour	Norwich City	St Johnstone	Free
1 February 2021	Brett McGavin	Ipswich Town	Ayr United	Loan
1 February 2021	Brandon Pierrick	Crystal Palace	Kilmarnock	Loan
1 February 2021	Zech Medley	Arsenal	Kilmarnock	Loan
1 February 2021	Fraser Hornby	Stade de Reims	Aberdeen	Loan
1 February 2021	Bruce Anderson	Aberdeen	Hamilton Academical	Loan
1 February 2021	Callum Hendry	St Johnstone	Aberdeen	Loan
1 February 2021	Florian Kamberi	St Gallen	Aberdeen	Loan
1 February 2021	Curtis Main	Aberdeen	Shrewsbury Town	Free
1 February 2021	Ross McCrorie	Rangers	Aberdeen	£350,000
1 February 2021	Scott Wright	Aberdeen	Rangers	£175,000
1 February 2021	Jack Simpson	Bournemouth	Rangers	Undisclosed
1 February 2021	Jonjoe Kenny	Everton	Celtic	Loan
1 February 2021	Olivier Ntcham	Celtic	Marseille	Loan
1 February 2021	Jordan Roberts	Heart of Midlothian	Motherwell	Loan
1 February 2021	Eddie Nolan	Crewe Alexandra	Motherwell	Loan
1 February 2021	Tyler Magloire	Blackburn Rovers	Motherwell	Loan
1 February 2021	Lewis Moore	Heart of Midlothian	Arbroath	Loan
1 February 2021	Aaron McEneff	Shamrock Rovers	Heart of Midlothian	Undisclosed
1 February 2021	Kazaiah Sterling	Tottenham Hotspur	Greenock Morton	Loan
1 February 2021	Jamie Gullan	Hibernian	Raith Rovers	Loan
1 February 2021	Djibril Diani	Grasshopper Zurich	Livingston	Loan
4 February 2021	Vytas Gašpuitis	FK Panevėžys	Dunfermline Athletic	Free
10 February 2021	Hatem Abd Elhamed	Celtic	Hapoel Be'er Sheva	Undisclosed
12 February 2021	Kyle Lafferty	Reggina	Kilmarnock	Free
12 February 2021	Craig Wighton	Heart of Midlothian	Dunfermline Athletic	Loan
18 February 2021	Ronald Hernández	Aberdeen	Atlanta United	Loan
19 February 2021	Justin Johnson	Hamilton Academical	Greenock Morton	Free
25 February 2021	Stuart Findlay	Kilmarnock	Philadelphia Union	Undisclosed
26 February 2021	Ryan Shanley	Hibernian	Finn Harps	Loan
5 March 2021	Cameron Harper	Celtic	New York Red Bulls	Undisclosed
11 March 2021	Ally Taylor	Kilmarnock	Stranraer	Loan
11 March 2021	Tomas Brindley	Kilmarnock	Dumbarton	Loan
12 March 2021	Stephen McGinn	Hibernian	Greenock Morton	Loan
12 March 2021	Lewis Neilson	Dundee United	Falkirk	Loan
12 March 2021	Kai Fotheringham	Dundee United	Falkirk	Loan
15 March 2021	Ross MacIver	Motherwell	Partick Thistle	Loan
15 March 2021	Yusuf Hussain	Motherwell	Brechin City	Loan
18 March 2021	Luca Connell	Celtic	Queen's Park	Loan
18 March 2021	Ryan Mullen	Celtic	Queen's Park	Loan
23 March 2021	Scott Tiffoney	Livingston	Partick Thistle	Loan
25 March 2021	Kieran Ngwenya	Aberdeen	Cove Rangers	Loan
25 March 2021	Kevin Hanratty	Aberdeen	Cove Rangers	Loan
26 March 2021	Ewan Henderson	Celtic	Dunfermline Athletic	Loan
27 March 2021	Scott Allan	Hibernian	Inverness Caledonian Thistle	Loan
29 March 2021	Shay Logan	Aberdeen	Heart of Midlothian	Loan
22 April 2021	Patryk Klimala	Celtic	New York Red Bulls	Undisclosed
25 April 2021	Ross Doohan	Celtic	Dundee United	Loan
7 May 2021	Zdeněk Zlámal	Heart of Midlothian	St Johnstone	Loan
17 May 2021	Scott Fox	Motherwell	Greenock Morton	Loan
21 May 2021	Youssouf Mulumbu	Kilmarnock	Saint-Éloi Lupopo	Free

== See also ==
- List of Scottish football transfers summer 2020
- List of Scottish football transfers summer 2021
