= 2022–23 Kilmarnock F.C. season =

Kilmarnock
2022–23 season
- Chairman: Billy Bowie
- Manager: Derek McInnes
- Stadium: Rugby Park
- Premiership: 10th place
- Scottish Cup: Quarter-final
- League Cup: Semi-final
- Top goalscorer: League: Daniel Armstrong (9); All: Daniel Armstrong (12)
- Highest home attendance: 9,162 vs. Celtic, Premiership, 14 August 2022
- Lowest home attendance: 2,429 vs. Stenhousemuir, League Cup, 23 July 2022
- Average home league attendance: 6,487
Home colours	Away colours	Third colours

The 2022–23 season was the 144th season of competitive association football and 10th season in the Scottish Professional Football League played by Kilmarnock Football Club, a professional football club based in Kilmarnock, Ayrshire, Scotland. Their first-place finish in the Scottish Championship in 2021–22 meant it was their first season back in the Scottish Premiership after spending one year in the second tier.

== Results and fixtures ==
=== Pre-season ===
Date	Opponents	H / A	Result F–A	Scorers
21 June 2022	Queen of the South	H	1–0	Murray
24 June 2022	Falkirk	A	4–1	Taylor 9', 90' Cameron 74', 81'
28 June 2022	Lincoln Red Imps	N	2–2	Hodson, Warnock
1 July 2022	Charlton Athletic	N	1–0	Lafferty
5 July 2022	Dunfermline Athletic	A	1–0	Armstrong 24'

=== Premiership ===
Date	Opponents	H / A	Result F–A	Scorers	Attendance	League position
30 July 2022	Dundee United	H	1–1	Taylor 90+1'	8,014	5th
6 August 2022	Rangers	A	0–2		49,600	9th
14 August 2022	Celtic	H	0–5		9,162	11th
20 August 2022	Ross County	A	0–1		3,133	11th
27 August 2022	Motherwell	H	2–1	Armstrong 71', Taylor 76'	6,238	9th
3 September 2022	Hibernian	A	0–1		15,426	11th
10 September 2022	St Johnstone	H	Postponed			
17 September 2022	Livingston	A	0–1		2,253	11th
1 October 2022	Aberdeen	A	1–4	Taylor 27'	16,348	11th
5 October 2022	St Johnstone	H	2–1	Armstrong 11', 46'	4,463	10th
9 October 2022	Heart of Midlothian	H	2–2	Stokes 47', Lafferty 59'	6,651	10th
15 October 2022	St Mirren	A	0–0		6,785	10th
22 October 2022	Ross County	H	1–0	Armstrong 20'	4,640	10th
29 October 2022	St Johnstone	A	0–1		3,995	10th
4 November 2022	Livingston	H	2–3	Wright 4', 45+2	5,239	10th
9 November 2022	Dundee United	A	0–4		7,430	12th
12 November 2022	Hibernian	H	1–0	Armstrong 53' (pen.)	6,391	11th
17 December 2022	Heart of Midlothian	A	1–3	Taylor 73'	18,645	11th
23 December 2022	Motherwell	A	2–2	McGinn 73' (o.g.), Polworth 75'	4,861	10th
28 December 2022	Aberdeen	H	2–1	Robinson 31', Wright 42'	6,171	9th
2 January 2023	St Mirren	H	0–0		7,008	9th
7 January 2023	Celtic	A	0–2		58,612	9th
18 January 2023	Rangers	H	2–3	Stokes 6', Wright 85'	8,461	11th
28 January 2023	Ross County	A	0–3		3,794	12th
1 February 2023	Dundee United	H	1–0	Armstrong 35'	4,620	9th
4 February 2023	Livingston	A	1–3	Doidge 47'	1,923	9th
18 February 2023	Hibernian	A	0–2		16,068	10th
25 February 2023	Motherwell	H	1–1	Robinson 17'	6,512	11th
4 March 2023	Rangers	A	1–3	Dorsett 60'	49,545	11th
18 March 2023	St Johnstone	H	1–1	Wright 38'	4,889	10th
1 April 2023	Heart of Midlothian	H	2–1	Armstrong 22' (pen.), Doidge 45'	7,237	10th
8 April 2023	Aberdeen	A	0–2		16,248	10th
16 April 2023	Celtic	H	1–4	Donnelly 45'	8,201	11th
22 April 2023	St Mirren	A	2–0	Donnelly 18', Doidge 35'	7,937	11th
6 May 2023	Motherwell	A	0–2		6,168	11th
13 May 2023	Livingston	H	2–0	Vassell 48', Armstrong 64' (pen.)	5,051	10th
20 May 2023	St Johnstone	H	0–1		6,004	10th
24 May 2023	Dundee United	A	3–0	Vassell 14', 44', Cameron 83'	10,406	10th
28 May 2023	Ross County	H	3–1	Lyons 36', Armstrong 49', Vassell 78'	8,301	10th

=== Scottish Cup ===
Date	Round	Opponents	H / A	Result F–A	Scorers	Attendance
21 January 2023	Fourth round	Dumbarton	H	1–0	Jones 90+1'	3,705
11 February 2023	Fifth round	Dundee United	A	1–0	Vassell 55'	4,620
10 March 2023	Quarter-final	Inverness Caledonian Thistle	A	1–2	Vassell 3'	2,902

=== League Cup ===
Date	Round	Opponents	H / A	Result F–A	Scorers	Attendance
9 July 2022	Group stage	Fraserburgh	A	3–1	Shaw 6', Murray 17', Lafferty 70'	1,022
13 July 2022	Group stage	Partick Thistle	H	1–1 (4–5p)	Donnelly 11'	3,012
16 July 2022	Group stage	Montrose	A	3–0	McInroy 37', Armstrong 69', Shaw 90+2'	901
23 July 2022	Group stage	Stenhousemuir	H	4–1	Polworth 5', Shaw 33' (pen.), 79', Armstrong 54'	2,429
31 August 2022	Second round	Heart of Midlothian	A	1–0	Cameron 27'	11,071
18 October 2022	Quarter-final	Dundee United	H	2–1	Lafferty 8' (pen.), Armstrong 73'	5,144
14 January 2023	Semi-final	Celtic	N	0–2		45,787

== Squad statistics ==
No.	Pos.	Name	Premiership		Scottish Cup		League Cup		Total		Discipline	
No.	Pos.	Name	Apps	Goals	Apps	Goals	Apps	Goals	Apps	Goals	Yellow card	Red card
1	GK	(England) Zach Hemming	10	0	1	0	4	0	15	0	0	0
2	DF	(Scotland) Lewis Mayo	34	0	3	0	6	0	42	0	3	0
3	DF	(England) Jeriel Dorsett	11	1	1	0	0	0	12	1	0	0
4	MF	(Republic of Ireland) Alan Power	32	0	2	0	7	0	41	0	5	1
5	DF	(Wales) Ash Taylor	32	4	2	0	7	0	41	4	6	1
6	DF	(England) Chris Stokes	15	2	1	0	1	0	17	2	2	0
7	MF	(Scotland) Rory McKenzie	36	0	2	0	7	0	45	0	11	1
8	MF	(Scotland) Blair Alston	16	0	1	0	1	0	18	0	0	0
9	FW	(Scotland) Oli Shaw	12	0	0	0	4	4	16	4	1	0
10	MF	(Northern Ireland) Jordan Jones	22	0	2	1	3	0	27	1	2	0
11	MF	(Scotland) Daniel Armstrong	37	9	3	0	7	3	47	12	9	1
12	DF	(Northern Ireland) Lee Hodson	0	0	0	0	4	0	4	0	0	0
14	DF	(England) Jack Sanders	4	0	1	0	1	0	6	0	0	0
15	MF	(Scotland) Fraser Murray	19	0	3	0	3	1	25	1	1	0
16	FW	(Scotland) Scott Robinson	16	2	2	0	1	0	19	2	0	0
17	MF	(Northern Ireland) Brad Lyons	19	1	1	0	4	0	24	1	3	0
18	DF	(Scotland) Calum Waters	2	0	0	0	3	0	5	0	0	0
19	DF	(Wales) Joe Wright	35	5	3	0	6	0	44	5	5	0
20	GK	(England) Sam Walker	28	0	2	0	4	0	34	0	2	0
21	MF	(Scotland) Kerr McInroy	12	0	1	0	3	1	16	1	0	0
22	MF	(Northern Ireland) Liam Donnelly	22	2	1	0	4	1	27	3	10	0
23	FW	(Republic of Ireland) Deji Sotona	2	0	0	0	0	0	2	0	1	0
23	FW	(Northern Ireland) Kyle Vassell	14	4	3	2	1	0	18	6	2	1
24	DF	(Australia) Dylan McGowan	0	0	0	0	3	0	3	0	0	0
24	DF	(England) Luke Chambers	14	0	2	0	0	0	16	0	1	0
25	DF	(England) Ryan Alebiosu	24	0	2	0	4	0	29	0	0	0
26	FW	(Scotland) Kyle Connell	0	0	0	0	1	0	1	0	0	0
26	FW	(Wales) Christian Doidge	27	3	3	0	2	0	32	3	6	0
27	FW	(Scotland) Innes Cameron	16	1	0	0	5	1	21	2	1	0
28	FW	(Northern Ireland) Kyle Lafferty	12	1	1	0	4	2	17	3	3	0
29	FW	(Scotland) Bobby Wales	10	0	0	0	0	0	10	0	0	0
31	MF	(Scotland) Liam Polworth	26	1	2	0	6	1	34	2	1	0
32	MF	(Scotland) Steven Warnock	1	0	0	0	0	0	1	0	0	0
33	DF	(England) Ben Chrisene	13	0	0	0	3	0	16	0	2	0
34	MF	(Scotland) David Watson	10	0	0	0	2	0	12	0	3	1

== Club statistics ==
=== Competition overview ===
Competition	First match	Last match	Record							
Competition	First match	Last match	Pld	W	D	L	GF	GA	GD	Win %
Premiership	30 July 2022	28 May 2023	38	11	7	20	37	62	−25	28.95
Scottish Cup	21 January 2023	10 March 2023	3	2	0	1	3	2	+1	66.67
League Cup	9 July 2022	14 January 2023	7	5	1	1	14	6	+8	71.43
Total			48	18	8	22	54	70	−16	37.50

Source: Competitions

=== League table ===
Pos	Team	Pld	W	D	L	GF	GA	GD	Pts	Qualification or relegation (Note: Teams play each other three times (33 matches), before the league is split into two groups (the top six and the bottom six).)
8	Livingston	38	13	7	18	36	60	−24	46	
9	St Johnstone	38	12	7	19	41	59	−18	43	
10	Kilmarnock	38	11	7	20	37	62	−25	40	
11	Ross County (O)	38	9	7	22	37	60	−23	34	Qualification for the Premiership play-off final
12	Dundee United (R)	38	8	7	23	40	70	−30	31	Relegation to Championship

Rules for classification: 1) Points; 2) Goal difference; 3) Goals scored; 4) Head-to-Head points; 5) Head-to-Head goal difference; 6) Play-off (only if deciding champion, UEFA competitions qualification, second stage group allocation or relegation).
(O) Play-off winners; (R) Relegated

=== League Cup table ===
Pos	Team	Pld	W	PW	PL	L	GF	GA	GD	Pts	Qualification	PAR	KIL	STE	MON	FRA
1	Partick Thistle	4	3	1	0	0	9	4	+5	11	Qualification for the second round	—	—	—	4–2	2–0
2	Kilmarnock	4	3	0	1	0	11	3	+8	10	Qualification for the second round	1–1p	—	4–1	—	—
3	Stenhousemuir	4	2	0	0	2	7	6	+1	6		1–2	—	—	—	3–0
4	Montrose	4	1	0	0	3	6	11	−5	3		—	0–3	0–2	—	—
5	Fraserburgh	4	0	0	0	4	3	12	−9	0		—	1–3	—	2–4	—

Rules for classification: 1) goal difference, 2) goals scored, 3) away goals scored, 4) matches won, 5) away matches won, 6) drawing of lots.

== Transfers ==
=== Transfers in ===
Date	Position	Name	Previous club	Fee	Ref.
19 May 2022	MF	(Republic of Ireland) Alan Power	St Mirren	Free	
13 June 2022	MF	Kerr McInroy	Celtic	Free	
20 June 2022	GK	(England) Zach Hemming	(England) Middlesbrough	Loan	
23 June 2022	DF	Lewis Mayo	Rangers	Loan	
5 July 2022	MF	(Northern Ireland) Liam Donnelly	Motherwell	Free	
13 July 2022	DF	(Wales) Joe Wright	(England) Doncaster Rovers	Free	
19 July 2022	MF	(Northern Ireland) Jordan Jones	(England) Wigan Athletic	Loan	
21 July 2022	DF	(England) Ryan Alebiosu	(England) Arsenal	Loan	
22 July 2022	GK	(England) Gary Woods	Aberdeen	Free	
5 August 2022	DF	(England) Jeriel Dorsett	(England) Reading	Loan	
9 August 2022	FW	(Republic of Ireland) Deji Sotona	(France) Nice	Loan	
25 August 2022	DF	(England) Ben Chrisene	(England) Aston Villa	Loan	
31 August 2022	FW	(Wales) Christian Doidge	Hibernian	Loan	
1 January 2023	FW	(Northern Ireland) Kyle Vassell	(United States) San Diego Loyal	Free	
30 January 2023	DF	(England) Luke Chambers	(England) Liverpool	Loan	

=== Transfers out ===
Date	Position	Name	Subsequent Club	Fee	Ref
10 May 2022	MF	Tomas Brindley	Forfar Athletic	Free	
10 May 2022	DF	(Northern Ireland) Euan Deveney	Airdrieonians	Free	
10 May 2022	GK	(Republic of Ireland) Colin Doyle	(England) Bradford City	Free	
10 May 2022	DF	(England) Brandon Haunstrup	(England) Cambridge United	Free	
10 May 2022	MF	Stephen McGinn	Falkirk	Free	
10 May 2022	DF	Jason Naismith	Queen's Park	Free	
26 May 2022	MF	Chris Burke	Retired		
24 June 2022	DF	Euan Murray	(England) Hartlepool United	Free	
6 July 2022	DF	Charlie McArthur	(England) Newcastle United	Undisclosed	
21 July 2022	GK	Curtis Lyle	East Kilbride	Loan	
29 July 2022	FW	Kyle Connell	Raith Rovers	Loan	
3 August 2022	DF	Kirk McKnight	Cumbernauld Colts	Loan	
13 August 2022	DF	(Northern Ireland) Lee Hodson	Partick Thistle	Loan	
30 September 2022	DF	Jon Craig	Clyde	Loan	
30 September 2022	DF	(England) Jack Sanders	Cove Rangers	Loan	
3 January 2023	GK	Curtis Lyle	Stenhousemuir	Free	
7 January 2023	DF	(Australia) Dylan McGowan	Hamilton Academical	Loan	
21 January 2023	MF	Aaron Brown	Stranraer	Loan	
26 January 2023	FW	Kyle Connell	East Kilbride	Free	
31 January 2023	FW	(Northern Ireland) Kyle Lafferty	(Northern Ireland) Linfield	Free	
31 January 2023	FW	Oli Shaw	(England) Barnsley	Undisclosed	
1 February 2023	GK	(England) Gary Woods	(England) Exeter City	Free	
4 February 2023	DF	Calum Waters	Greenock Morton	Loan	
16 February 2023	MF	Steven Warnock	Edinburgh City	Loan	
