= 2020–21 Kilmarnock F.C. season =

Kilmarnock
2020–21 season
- Chairman: Billy Bowie
- Manager: Alex Dyer (until 30 January); Tommy Wright (from 8 February)
- Stadium: Rugby Park
- Premiership: 11th (Relegated)
- Scottish Cup: Quarter-finals
- League Cup: Group stage
- Top goalscorer: League: Chris Burke (9); All: Kyle Lafferty (13)
Home colours	Away colours

The 2020–21 season is Kilmarnock's eighth season in the Scottish Premiership, and their 28th consecutive season in the top flight of Scottish football. Kilmarnock also competed in the Scottish League Cup and the Scottish Cup.

== Overview ==
Kilmarnock began the 2020–21 season under the management of Alex Dyer who signed a two-year contract in June 2020, following his spell in temporary charge.

In the League Cup, Kilmarnock were drawn in Group E alongside Clyde, Dumbarton, Dunfermline Athletic and Falkirk. The competition is scheduled to start in October 2020.

== Results and fixtures ==
=== Pre-season ===
Date	Opponents	H / A	Result F–A	Scorers
17 July 2020	Motherwell	A	3–2	Kabamba 40', Trialist 75', Kiltie 81'
22 July 2020	Livingston	H	1–2	McKenzie 51'
25 July 2020	Dundee United	A	1–1	Kiltie 46'
15 September 2020	Alloa Athletic	A	3–2	Whitehall 49' (pen.), Warnock 85', Deveney 88'

=== Scottish Premiership ===
Date	Opponents	H / A	Result F–A	Scorers	Attendance	League position
1 August 2020	Hibernian	A	1–2	Burke 44'	0	8th
9 August 2020	Celtic	H	1–1	Burke 24' (pen.)	0	8th
12 August 2020	Ross County	A	2–2	Power 59', Burke 66'	0	7th
15 August 2020	St Johnstone	H	1–2	Tshibola 61'	0	8th
22 August 2020	Rangers	A	0–2		0	11th
29 August 2020	Dundee United	H	4–0	Kabamba 30', 79', Brophy 45+1', McKenzie 86'	0	9th
12 September 2020	Aberdeen	A	0–1		300	10th
19 September 2020	Hamilton Academical	H	2–1	Kiltie 10', Kabamba 57'	0	7th
26 September 2020	St Mirren	A	1–0	Kabamba 28'	0	5th
17 October 2020	Livingston	A	3–1	Tshibola 24', Burke 37' (pen.), Kiltie 57'	0	5th
24 October 2020	Hibernian	H	0–1		0	5th
1 November 2020	Rangers	H	0–1		0	6th
6 November 2020	St Johnstone	A	0–1		0	6th
21 November 2020	Ross County	H	3–1	Brophy 14', Kabamba 68' (pen.), Burke 90+3'	0	6th
5 December 2020	Hamilton Academical	A	0–1		0	7th
13 December 2020	Celtic	A	0–2		0	8th
20 December 2020	Aberdeen	H	0–2		0	8th
23 December 2020	Dundee United	A	0–2		0	8th
26 December 2020	Livingston	H	1–2	Burke 48' (pen.)	0	8th
30 December 2020	Motherwell	A	2–0	Kiltie 41', Whitehall 53' (pen.)	0	8th
2 January 2021	St Mirren	H	1–1	Whitehall 12'	0	8th
9 January 2021	Hamilton Academical	H	2–0	Kiltie 36', 63'	0	7th
16 January 2021	Hibernian	A	0–2		0	7th
27 January 2021	Livingston	A	0–2		0	8th
30 January 2021	St Johnstone	H	2–3	Burke 5', Tshibola 32'	0	8th
2 February 2021	Celtic	H	0–4		0	10th
6 February 2021	St Mirren	A	0–2		0	10th
10 February 2021	Motherwell	H	0–1		0	10th
13 February 2021	Rangers	A	0–1		0	10th
20 February 2021	Aberdeen	A	0–1		0	11th
27 February 2021	Dundee United	H	1–1	Medley 64'	0	11th
6 March 2021	Ross County	A	2–3	Lafferty 18', 77' (pen.)	0	12th
13 March 2021	Motherwell	H	4–1	Lafferty 1', McKenzie 55', Burke 57', Pinnock 83'	0	11th
10 April 2021	Ross County	H	2–2	Burke 3', Pinnock 16'	0	11th
21 April 2021	Dundee United	H	3–0	Lafferty 32', 35', 43' (pen.)	0	10th
1 May 2021	Motherwell	A	0–2		0	11th
12 May 2021	St Mirren	H	3–3	Lafferty 8', 61', Kiltie 81'	0	11th
16 May 2021	Hamilton Academical	A	2–0	Pinnock 9', 44'	0	11th

Notes

1. A: Kilmarnock's match against Motherwell on 2 October was postponed after six Kilmarnock players tested positive for COVID-19. Following an SPFL investigation, Motherwell were initially awarded a technical 3–0 win pending an appeal from Kilmarnock. However the result was eventually overturned and rescheduled for a later date.

==== Premiership play-off final ====
Date	Round	Opponents	H / A	Result F–A	Scorers	Attendance	Referee
20 May 2021	First leg	Dundee	A	1–2	Haunstrup 77'	500	John Beaton
24 May 2021	Second leg	Dundee	H	1–2	Lafferty 69' pen.	500	Bobby Madden

=== Scottish Cup ===
Date	Round	Opponents	H / A	Result F–A	Scorers	Attendance
3 April 2021	Third round	Stenhousemuir	A	4–0	Lafferty 38' (pen.), 45+1', 56', Oakley 87'	0
17 April 2021	Fourth round	Montrose	H	3–1	Lafferty 6', Steeves 24' (o.g.), Kiltie 61'	0
26 April 2021	Quarter-final	St Mirren	H	3–3 (a.e.t.) (4–5p)	Rossi 37', Kiltie 44', Millen 101' (pen.)	0

=== Scottish League Cup ===
Group stage

Date	Round	Opponents	H / A	Result F–A	Scorers	Attendance
6 October 2020	Group stage	Falkirk	A	0–3		0
13 October 2020	Group stage	Dunfermline Athletic	H	0–3		0
10 November 2020	Group stage	Clyde	A	2–0	Whitehall 44', 49'	0
14 November 2020	Group stage	Dumbarton	H	2–0	Brophy 3', Pinnock 45+2'	0

Notes

1. B: Falkirk were awarded a technical 3−0 win over Kilmarnock who were unable to raise a team after six players tested positive for COVID-19.

== Squad statistics ==
No.	Pos.	Name	Premiership		Scottish Cup		League Cup		Total		Discipline	
No.	Pos.	Name	Apps	Goals	Apps	Goals	Apps	Goals	Apps	Goals	Yellow card	Red card
1	GK	(England) Jake Eastwood	1	0	0	0	1	0	2	0	0	0
2	DF	(England) Aaron McGowan	18	0	0	0	2	0	20	0	4	0
3	DF	(England) Brandon Haunstrup	26	0	2	0	2	0	30	0	4	1
4	DF	(Republic of the Congo) Clevid Dikamona	12	0	0	0	0	0	12	0	1	1
5	DF	(Scotland) Kirk Broadfoot	31	0	3	0	1	0	35	0	3	0
6	MF	(Republic of Ireland) Alan Power	32	1	3	0	1	0	36	1	17	0
7	MF	(Scotland) Rory McKenzie	29	2	3	0	3	0	35	2	5	0
8	MF	(Republic of Ireland) Gary Dicker	26	0	2	0	1	0	29	0	4	0
9	FW	(Scotland) Eamonn Brophy	14	2	0	0	2	1	16	3	0	1
9	FW	(England) George Oakley	5	0	3	1	0	0	8	1	1	0
10	MF	(Scotland) Greg Kiltie	29	6	2	2	0	0	31	8	2	0
11	FW	(England) Nicke Kabamba	33	5	1	0	1	0	35	5	3	0
12	FW	(England) Danny Whitehall	17	2	0	0	2	2	19	4	1	0
14	DF	(England) Zeno Ibsen Rossi	14	0	2	1	2	0	18	1	1	0
15	FW	(England) Brandon Pierrick	3	0	0	0	0	0	3	0	0	0
16	GK	(Republic of Ireland) Colin Doyle	11	0	2	0	2	0	15	0	0	0
17	DF	(Scotland) Stuart Findlay	22	0	0	0	1	0	23	0	0	1
18	DF	(Scotland) Calum Waters	18	0	1	0	0	0	19	0	1	0
19	DF	(England) Mitchell Pinnock	30	4	3	0	2	1	35	5	0	0
20	FW	(Scotland) Innes Cameron	0	0	0	0	1	0	1	0	0	0
21	MF	(Democratic Republic of the Congo) Youssouf Mulumbu	16	0	2	0	2	0	20	0	1	0
22	DF	(Scotland) Ross Millen	19	0	3	1	0	0	22	1	1	2
23	GK	(Republic of Ireland) Danny Rogers	25	0	0	0	0	0	25	0	1	0
24	DF	(England) Zech Medley	8	1	2	0	0	0	10	1	0	0
25	FW	(Scotland) Kyle Connell	0	0	0	0	0	0	0	0	0	0
26	MF	(France) Diaguely Dabo	6	0	0	0	0	0	6	0	1	0
27	MF	(Democratic Republic of the Congo) Aaron Tshibola	31	3	3	0	0	0	34	3	9	0
28	FW	(Northern Ireland) Kyle Lafferty	9	8	2	4	0	0	11	12	4	0
29	MF	(Scotland) Chris Burke	36	9	3	0	1	0	40	9	3	0
32	MF	(Scotland) Tomas Brindley	1	0	0	0	1	0	2	0	0	0
33	MF	(Scotland) Ally Taylor	0	0	0	0	0	0	0	0	0	0
34	GK	(Scotland) Curtis Lyle	0	0	0	0	0	0	0	0	0	0
36	DF	(Northern Ireland) Euan Deveney	0	0	0	0	1	0	1	0	0	0
37	DF	(Scotland) Craig Ross	0	0	0	0	1	0	1	0	0	0
38	DF	(Scotland) Keir Russell	0	0	0	0	1	0	1	0	0	0
39	FW	(Scotland) Josh Rennie	0	0	0	0	1	0	1	0	0	0
42	MF	(Scotland) Steven Warnock	0	0	1	0	1	0	2	0	0	0
43	DF	(Scotland) Kenny Sloan	0	0	0	0	1	0	1	0	0	0
44	MF	(Scotland) Fergus Dee	0	0	0	0	1	0	1	0	0	0
45	FW	(Scotland) Michael Mullen	0	0	0	0	1	0	1	0	0	0
47	MF	(Scotland) Ross Smith	0	0	0	0	1	0	1	0	0	0

== Club statistics ==
=== Competition overview ===
Competition	First match	Last match	Record							
Competition	First match	Last match	Pld	W	D	L	GF	GA	GD	Win %
Premiership	1 August 2020	16 May 2021	38	10	6	22	43	54	−11	26.32
Scottish Cup	3 April 2021	26 April 2021	3	2	1	0	10	4	+6	66.67
League Cup	6 October 2020	14 November 2020	4	2	0	2	4	6	−2	50.00
Total			45	14	7	24	57	64	−7	31.11

Source: Competitions

=== League table ===
Pos	Team	Pld	W	D	L	GF	GA	GD	Pts	Qualification or relegation (Note: Teams play each other three times (33 matches), before the league is split into two groups (the top six and the bottom six).)
8	Motherwell	38	12	9	17	39	55	−16	45	
9	Dundee United	38	10	14	14	32	50	−18	44	
10	Ross County	38	11	6	21	35	66	−31	39	
11	Kilmarnock (R)	38	10	6	22	43	54	−11	36	Qualification for the Premiership play-off final
12	Hamilton Academical (R)	38	7	9	22	34	67	−33	30	Relegation to Championship

Rules for classification: 1) Points; 2) Goal difference; 3) Goals scored; 4) Head-to-head points; 5) Head-to-Head goal difference; 6) Play-off (only if deciding champion, UEFA competitions qualification, second stage group allocation or relegation).
(R) Relegated

=== League Cup table ===
Pos	Team	Pld	W	PW	PL	L	GF	GA	GD	Pts	Qualification	DNF	FAL	KIL	CLY	DUM
1	Dunfermline Athletic	4	4	0	0	0	9	2	+7	12	Qualification for the Second round	—	2–0	—	3–2	—
2	Falkirk	4	3	0	0	1	9	3	+6	9	Qualification for the Second round	—	—	3–0	2–1	—
3	Kilmarnock	4	2	0	0	2	4	6	−2	6		0–3	—	—	—	2–0
4	Clyde	4	1	0	0	3	6	9	−3	3		—	—	0–2	—	3–2
5	Dumbarton	4	0	0	0	4	2	10	−8	0		0–1	0–4	—	—	—

Rules for classification: 1) points, 2) goal difference, 3) goals scored, 4) away goals scored, 5) matches won, 6) away matches won, 7) drawing of lots.

== Transfers ==
=== Transfers in ===
Date	Position	Name	Previous club	Fee	Ref.
15 June 2020	DF	(England) Aaron McGowan	Hamilton Academical	Free	
8 July 2020	MF	(England) Mitchell Pinnock	(England) AFC Wimbledon	Free	
15 July 2020	DF	(England) Zeno Ibsen Rossi	(England) Bournemouth	Loan	
21 July 2020	FW	(England) Danny Whitehall	(England) Maidenhead United	Free	
22 July 2020	DF	(England) Brandon Haunstrup	(England) Portsmouth	Free	
28 July 2020	GK	(Republic of Ireland) Danny Rogers	Aberdeen	Free	
30 July 2020	GK	(England) Jake Eastwood	(England) Sheffield United	Loan	
31 July 2020	MF	(Democratic Republic of the Congo) Aaron Tshibola	(Portugal) Aves	Free	
6 August 2020	MF	(Republic of the Congo) Clevid Dikamona	Heart of Midlothian	Free	
11 August 2020	DF	(Republic of Ireland) Colin Doyle	Heart of Midlothian	Loan	
28 August 2020	MF	(Democratic Republic of the Congo) Youssouf Mulumbu	Free Agent	Free	
31 December 2020	MF	(France) Diaguely Dabo	Free Agent	Free	
26 January 2021	FW	(England) George Oakley	(Bulgaria) Pirin Blagoevgrad	Free	
1 February 2021	MF	(England) Brandon Pierrick	(England) Crystal Palace	Loan	
1 February 2021	DF	(England) Zech Medley	(England) Arsenal	Loan	
12 February 2021	FW	(Northern Ireland) Kyle Lafferty	(Italy) Reggina	Free	

=== Transfers out ===
Date	Position	Name	Subsequent Club	Fee	Ref
19 May 2020	MF	Adam Frizzell	Dumbarton	Free	
19 May 2020	GK	Devlin MacKay	Free Agent	Free	
19 May 2020	MF	(England) Harry Bunn	(England) York City	Free	
25 June 2020	GK	Jamie Walker	Stranraer	Free	
10 July 2020	MF	Dom Thomas	Dunfermline Athletic	Undisclosed	
16 July 2020	GK	Jamie MacDonald	Raith Rovers	Free	
16 July 2020	MF	Iain Wilson	Dunfermline Athletic	Free	
1 August 2020	DF	Stephen Hendrie	(England) Morecambe	Free	
6 August 2020	GK	(Slovenia) Jan Koprivec	(Slovenia) Tabor Sežana	Free	
13 August 2020	DF	Stephen O'Donnell	Motherwell	Free	
31 August 2020	MF	(Netherlands) Mohamed El Makrini	(Norway) IK Start	Undisclosed	
6 October 2020	FW	Kyle Connell	Airdrieonians	Loan	
23 October 2020	FW	Innes Cameron	Ayr United	Loan	
23 October 2020	DF	(Northern Ireland) Euan Deveney	Falkirk	Loan	
8 January 2021	FW	Eamonn Brophy	St Mirren	Loan	
23 January 2021	FW	Innes Cameron	Alloa Athletic	Loan	
25 February 2021	DF	Stuart Findlay	(United States) Philadelphia Union	Undisclosed	
11 March 2021	MF	Tomas Brindley	Dumbarton	Loan	
11 March 2021	MF	Ally Taylor	Stranraer	Loan	
