= Colin Doyle (footballer) =

Irish footballer (born 1985)

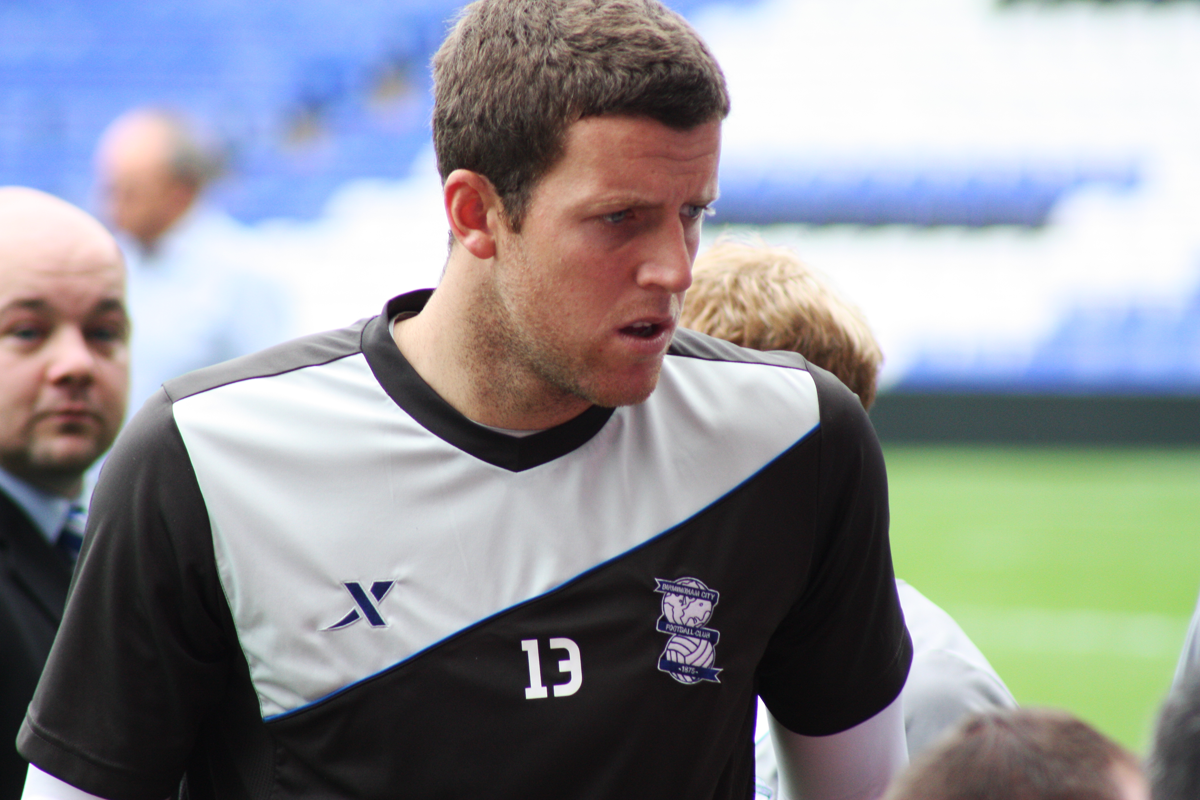
- Doyle with Birmingham City in 2011

Personal information
- Full name: Colin Anthony Doyle
- Date of birth: 12 June 1985 (age 41)
- Place of birth: Cork, Ireland
- Height: 1.96 m (6 ft 5 in)
- Position: Goalkeeper

Team information
- Current team: Bradford City (goalkeeping coach)
- Number: 13

Youth career
- –2001: Douglas Hall
- 2001–2003: Birmingham City

Senior career*
Years	Team	Apps	(Gls)
2003–2015	Birmingham City	31	(0)
2004	→ Chester City (loan)	0	(0)
2004–2005	→ Nottingham Forest (loan)	3	(0)
2005	→ Millwall (loan)	4	(0)
2005–2006	→ Millwall (loan)	4	(0)
2006	→ Millwall (loan)	6	(0)
2010	→ Coventry City (loan)	0	(0)
2015–2016	Blackpool	33	(0)
2016–2018	Bradford City	79	(0)
2018–2021	Heart of Midlothian	11	(0)
2020–2021	→ Kilmarnock (loan)	11	(0)
2021–2022	Kilmarnock	0	(0)
2022–2025	Bradford City	0	(0)
2026–	Bradford City	0	(0)
Total		182	(0)

International career
2004–2006	Republic of Ireland U21	4	(0)
2007	Republic of Ireland B	1	(0)
2007–2018	Republic of Ireland	4	(0)
- * Club domestic league appearances and goals as of 18:04, 17 July 2025 (UTC)

Colin Anthony Doyle (born 12 June 1985) is an Irish professional football coach who is a goalkeeping coach for EFL League One club Bradford City

As a player, Doyle spent twelve years as a professional with Birmingham City. He made his debut in the Football League in April 2005 while on loan to Championship club Nottingham Forest, and also had loan spells at Chester City, Millwall and Coventry City. He moved on to Blackpool ahead of the 2015–16 season, and a year later began a two-year spell with Bradford City. Doyle joined Heart of Midlothian in 2018, and spent time on loan at Kilmarnock in the 2020–21 season, after which he returned to the club as player-coach.

At international level, Doyle has represented the Republic of Ireland at under-21, B and senior levels. He made his full international debut in May 2007 against Ecuador. He earned appearances for the Republic of Ireland national team.

== Club career ==
=== Early career ===
Doyle was born in Cork, County Cork, and attended Douglas Community School. He played both Gaelic football and hurling with Douglas GAA, before taking up association football with Douglas Hall. He joined Birmingham City as an academy scholar during 2001, before signing his first professional contract in 2003. He made his first senior appearance for the club during the 4–0 victory over the Malaysian national team during the first Premier League Asia Trophy on 26 July 2003, replacing Ian Bennett with 13 minutes of the match remaining.

Having not yet made a professional appearance for Birmingham, Doyle joined League Two club Chester City on loan in October 2004. Chester's first-choice goalkeeper Wayne Brown was injured and they needed cover for reserve Chris Mackenzie. While at Chester, Doyle played his first match in English senior football as Chester defeated Rochdale in the Football League Trophy.

After returning to Birmingham, Doyle soon linked up with Championship club Nottingham Forest on a short-term loan in December 2004. The loan was then extended to keep him at the City Ground for the rest of the season. Doyle made his first-team debut for Forest in a fifth-round FA Cup tie against Tottenham Hotspur on 20 February 2005. As the match approached half-time, Doyle gifted Tottenham the lead as a Jermain Defoe free kick bounced out of his hands and into the net, but Forest were able to equalise in the second half to take the tie to a replay. Even though Doyle only played in a further three league matches for Forest, he said he was glad to be able to play regular reserve-team football and the loan spell had exceeded his expectations. He was rumoured to be returning to Forest on loan for the following season, a move which did not occur.

Doyle's next loan move saw him join Millwall in November 2005 for a month. He went straight into the team for their match against Leeds United on 26 November. With the match goalless going into injury time, Millwall defender Ben May put the ball past Doyle for an own goal to give Leeds a 1–0 victory. Doyle was recalled from loan on 19 December to cover for the suspended Nico Vaesen. Doyle was on the bench for Birmingham's League Cup quarter-final against Manchester United the next day, and then returned to Millwall three days later on an emergency seven-day loan. This loan deal was extended for another seven days before Doyle returned to Birmingham on 5 January 2006 after manager Steve Bruce had refused Millwall permission to use him in the FA Cup. A week later, Doyle agreed to go to Millwall for a third loan spell in the 2005–06 season, this time staying with the Lions until the end of the season. In total, Doyle played 14 matches for Millwall during his three loan spells, keeping two clean sheets.

=== First-team football with Birmingham ===
During his loan spell at Millwall, Doyle had suggested he might want to stay with the club on a permanent basis, despite the offer of a new contract from his parent club. However, at the end of the season he signed a two-year deal with Birmingham. Because Vaesen's contract had expired, there was an expectation that Doyle would step up to second-choice goalkeeper behind Maik Taylor. Doyle played his first competitive match for Birmingham in their League Cup first-round match against Shrewsbury Town on 22 August 2006, in which he kept a clean sheet as his club won 1–0. With Taylor injured, Doyle made his first league appearance for Birmingham four days later in a 2–0 defeat away to Cardiff City. Doyle played in the second and third rounds of the League Cup, against Wrexham and Sheffield United, before losing his place in the cup team to Taylor for the quarter-final defeat to Liverpool.

Doyle was preferred to Taylor for the visit to Colchester United in February 2007; according to the Birmingham Mail, "Doyle was unruffled and did himself a lot of good. His handling was sound, he got the game moving quickly and even though some of his kicks were skewed wide, he whacked the ball long and hard." Assistant manager Eric Black said that Doyle had "shown that he's more than capable and he's ready to have a go now and challenge Maik Taylor" for the starting position. He kept his place in the team for the remainder of the season as Birmingham were promoted back to the Premier League. At the club's end of season awards, Doyle picked up both the "Breakthrough Award" and the award for "Magic Moment of the Season", for his penalty save from Wolverhampton Wanderers' Michael McIndoe at Molineux that gained Birmingham a crucial three points. Doyle finished the season with eight clean sheets from 22 appearances.

He remained in the starting line-up for the start of the 2007–08 Premier League season, but after a difficult first three matches, he was dropped in favour of Taylor, and Richard Kingson was selected as substitute goalkeeper. Birmingham were relegated at the end of the season but won immediate promotion back to the Premier League the following season; Doyle played in two league matches.

=== Return to second choice ===
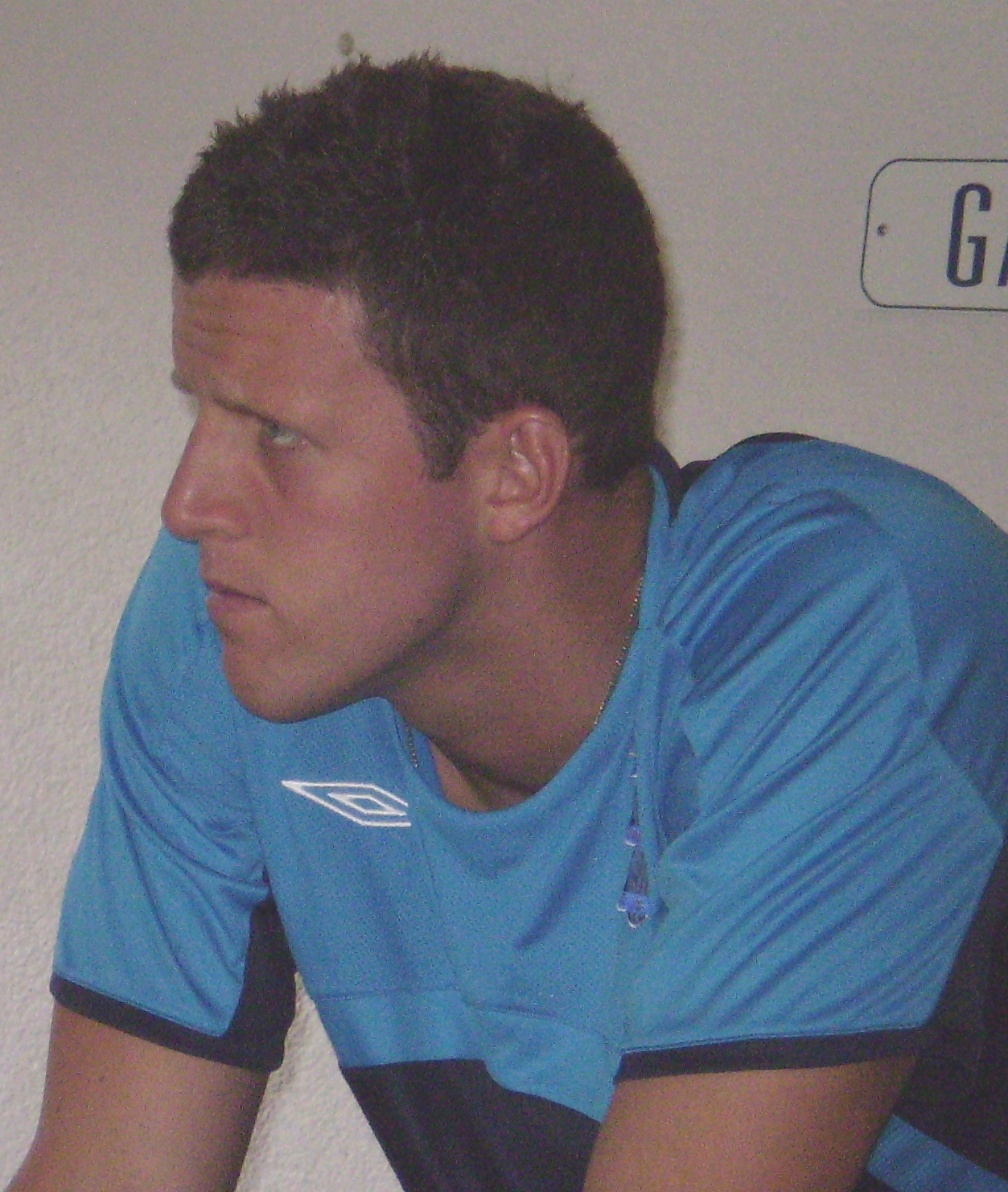
Doyle in 2009

Following the loan signing of Joe Hart from Manchester City for the 2009–10 Premier League season, Doyle remained third choice, behind Hart and Taylor, a position he retained after Hart's replacement by England international Ben Foster and Taylor's signing of a contract extension before the 2010–11 season.

On 29 July 2010, Doyle had a trial with Plymouth Argyle, playing 45 minutes of a friendly against Hereford United, but no deal materialised, and on 10 August 2010, Doyle signed on loan for Coventry City. He was signed as emergency cover while Keiren Westwood was away on international duty, coming in for the League Cup match against Morecambe, but was recalled only a day later because of an injury to Foster. In January 2011, Doyle played his first match for Birmingham for nearly two years in a 3–2 defeat of Coventry in the FA Cup fourth round, and kept his place for the fifth-round tie against Sheffield Wednesday, keeping a clean sheet as the home team won 3–0. After his appearance for Coventry versus Morecambe earlier in the season Doyle was cup-tied for Birmingham's victorious run in the 2010–11 Football League Cup; for the final Foster started and Taylor was on the bench. He made his first Premier League appearance since August 2007, as a first-half substitute for the injured Foster, in a 5–0 defeat at Liverpool in April in which he conceded three goals.

After Birmingham were relegated at the end of the season, the club took up their option of an extra year on Doyle's contract, despite accusations of inappropriate late-night drinking after the club's end-of-season dinner. He made 16 appearances in the 2011–12 season, including three matches in Birmingham's UEFA Europa League campaign, and both legs of the Championship play-off semi-final. He made an error in a 2–1 win over Maribor, where he misjudged a pass from Jonathan Spector to allow Dalibor Volaš to score the match's opening goal. In the FA Cup, Doyle saved two penalties from Juan Mata in the FA Cup; one in the initial fifth-round match, which finished 1–1, and one in the replay, which ended in a 2–0 defeat. His performance in the initial match against Chelsea resulted in him being named as the man of the match. At the end of the season, he received a special award for completing ten senior seasons with the club, extended to an eleventh when he signed a one-year contract, despite expectations that youngster Jack Butland might be first choice goalkeeper.

Doyle made his first appearance of the 2012–13 season in a 3–2 League Cup defeat at Coventry City. Despite only playing three matches during the 2012–13 season, Doyle was offered a new two-year contract at the end of the season.

In July 2013, Doyle was brought on as a centre forward for the last six minutes of a pre-season match against Shamrock Rovers because of an injury to striker Matt Green after all the outfield substitutes had been used. Again, he made his first competitive appearance of the season in the League Cup. In the 2014–15 season, he played three cup matches and once in the league, putting in an impressive performance in a 1–0 defeat at Blackburn Rovers when Darren Randolph was suspended. He was released when his contract expired at the end of his twelfth season as a professional with Birmingham City. The Birmingham Mail dubbed his departure the "end of an era".

=== Blackpool ===
In June 2015, Doyle signed a two-year contract with Blackpool, newly relegated to League One. He was named club captain, and selected as starting goalkeeper, ahead of Kyle Letheren, for the opening match of the season, away to Colchester United. He made several saves to keep his team in the match, but damaged a shoulder in thwarting Colchester's Gavin Massey and had to leave the field. After an initial prognosis of three months out, a scan suggested he could return to action within a month. He was back in the team for the visit to Scunthorpe United on 5 September, and produced a man-of-the-match performance that earned him a place in the Football League's Team of the Week as Blackpool won their first match of the season. Ankle ligament damage suffered in early November kept him out until the new year.

=== Bradford City ===
Following Blackpool's relegation, Doyle joined League One club Bradford City for a fee of £1 after Bradford triggered a release clause in Doyle's contract. He played regularly, making 50 appearances in all competitions, as Bradford reached the play-off final, in which they lost to Millwall.

In March 2018 he played two matches in 24 hours – one for Ireland, one for Bradford City. He was offered a new contract at the end of the 2017–18 season, but did not take it up.

=== Heart of Midlothian ===
Doyle signed a two-year contract with Scottish Premiership club Heart of Midlothian on 19 July 2018.

In May 2019 he was linked with a transfer back to former club Bradford City.

=== Kilmarnock ===
On 11 August 2020, Doyle signed for another Scottish Premiership club, Kilmarnock, on loan until January. The loan was extended until the end of the season, and he took his total of games played to 18 in all competitions, which included both legs of the play-off by which Kilmarnock were relegated to the Scottish Championship. In June 2021, he rejoined Kilmarnock as a player-coach.

=== Return to Bradford City ===
In June 2022 he returned to Bradford City as a player-coach. His first-team duties were initially confined to coaching and the substitutes' bench – he was an unused substitute in every one of Bradford City's League Two fixtures in both of his first two seasons – but in the 2023–24 season he kept goal in EFL Trophy matches, in which Bradford City reached and lost 1–0 to Wycombe Wanderers in the semi-final.

== Coaching career ==
At the end of the 2023–24 season, he was offered a new contract by Bradford City. At the end of the 2024–25 season, Bradford City entered into discussions with him regarding a new contract. Doyle retired from playing in July 2025, remaining with the club as a goalkeeping coach.

In September 2026, Doyle became joint caretaker manager with Mark Trueman. He also re-registered as a player for the match against Reading on 3 October 2026.

== International career ==
In August 2006, Doyle played for the Republic of Ireland under-21s away against Greece and kept a clean sheet in a 2–0 victory. He went on to make three further appearances for the U21 team. He made his first appearance for the senior national team, starting in a 1–1 friendly draw with Ecuador, on 23 May 2007. The match was at Giants Stadium in East Rutherford, New Jersey. Following this match, he made an appearance for the Republic of Ireland B squad, playing 81 minutes of a match against Scotland B on 20 November 2007.

In November 2016, regular football for Bradford City – chasing promotion from League One – and an impressive performance when watched by Ireland's goalkeeping coach, Jim McDonagh, led to Doyle's recall to the international squad for the first time in seven years. He was an unused substitute for the World Cup qualifier away to Austria; his former Birmingham teammate Darren Randolph kept a clean sheet as Ireland won 1–0. On 23 March 2018, he made his first senior appearance for Ireland in almost 11 years, playing the full 90 minutes in a 1–0 defeat to Turkey.

== Personal life ==
Doyle and his wife Becky have three children.

== Career statistics ==
=== Club ===
As of match played 10 December 2024

Appearances and goals by club, season and competition
Club	Season	League			National Cup (Note: Includes FA Cup, Scottish Cup)		League Cup (Note: Includes Football League Cup/EFL Cup, Scottish League Cup)		Other		Total	
Club	Season	Division	Apps	Goals	Apps	Goals	Apps	Goals	Apps	Goals	Apps	Goals
Birmingham City	2003–04	Premier League	0	0	0	0	0	0	—		0	0
Birmingham City	2004–05	Premier League	0	0	0	0	0	0	—		0	0
Birmingham City	2005–06	Premier League	0	0	0	0	0	0	—		0	0
Birmingham City	2006–07	Championship	19	0	0	0	3	0	—		22	0
Birmingham City	2007–08	Premier League	3	0	1	0	1	0	—		5	0
Birmingham City	2008–09	Championship	2	0	0	0	2	0	—		4	0
Birmingham City	2009–10	Premier League	0	0	0	0	0	0	—		0	0
Birmingham City	2010–11	Premier League	1	0	2	0	0	0	—		3	0
Birmingham City	2011–12	Championship	5	0	5	0	1	0	5 (Note: Three appearances in UEFA Europa League, two in Championship play-offs)	0	16	0
Birmingham City	2012–13	Championship	0	0	2	0	1	0	—		3	0
Birmingham City	2013–14	Championship	0	0	2	0	4	0	—		6	0
Birmingham City	2014–15	Championship	1	0	1	0	2	0	—		4	0
Birmingham City	Total		31	0	13	0	14	0	5	0	63	0
Chester City (loan)	2004–05	League Two	0	0	0	0	—		1 (Note: Appearance in Football League Trophy)	0	1	0
Nottingham Forest (loan)	2004–05	Championship	3	0	1	0	—		—		4	0
Millwall (loan)	2005–06	Championship	14	0	—		—		—		14	0
Coventry City (loan)	2010–11	Championship	0	0	—		1	0	—		1	0
Blackpool	2015–16	League One	33	0	1	0	0	0	1	0	35	0
Bradford City	2016–17	League One	44	0	1	0	1	0	4 (Note: One appearance in EFL Trophy, three in League One play-offs)	0	50	0
Bradford City	2017–18	League One	35	0	1	0	1	0	1 (Note: Appearance(s) in EFL Trophy)	0	38	0
Bradford City	Total		79	0	2	0	2	0	5	0	88	0
Heart of Midlothian	2018–19	Scottish Premiership	9	0	2	0	0	0	—		11	0
Heart of Midlothian	2019–20	Scottish Premiership	2	0	0	0	0	0	—		2	0
Heart of Midlothian	2020–21	Scottish Championship	0	0	0	0	0	0	—		0	0
Heart of Midlothian	Total		11	0	2	0	0	0	0	0	13	0
Heart of Midlothian U20	2018–19	—			—		—		1 (Note: Appearance in Scottish Challenge Cup)	0	1	0
Heart of Midlothian U20	2019–20	—			—		—		1	0	1	0
Heart of Midlothian U20	Total		—		—		—		2	0	2	0
Kilmarnock (loan)	2020–21	Scottish Premiership	11	0	3	0	2	0	2 (Note: Appearances in Scottish Premiership play-offs)	0	18	0
Kilmarnock (loan)	2021–22	Scottish Championship	0	0	0	0	0	0	—		0	0
Kilmarnock (loan)	Total		11	0	3	0	2	0	2	0	18	0
Kilmarnock	2022–23	Scottish Premiership	0	0	0	0	0	0	—		0	0
Bradford City	2022–23	League Two	0	0	0	0	0	0	0	0	0	0
Bradford City	2023–24	League Two	0	0	0	0	0	0	6	0	6	0
Bradford City	2024–25	League Two	0	0	0	0	0	0	4	0	4	0
Bradford City	Total		0	0	0	0	0	0	10	0	10	0
Career total			182	0	22	0	19	0	26	0	249	0

=== International ===
Appearances and goals by national team and year
National team	Year	Apps	Goals
Republic of Ireland	2007	1	0
Republic of Ireland	2018	3	0
Total		4	0
