= Fraser Murray =

Scottish footballer (born 1999)

Personal information
- Full name: Fraser Stuart Murray
- Date of birth: 7 May 1999 (age 27)
- Place of birth: Glasgow, Scotland
- Height: 1.83 m (6 ft 0 in)
- Position: Midfielder

Team information
- Current team: Wigan Athletic
- Number: 7

Youth career
- –2016: Hibernian

Senior career*
| Years | Team | Apps | (Gls) |
| 2016–2021 | Hibernian | 17 | (0) |
| 2020–2021 | → Dunfermline Athletic (loan) | 23 | (4) |
| 2021–2025 | Kilmarnock | 101 | (7) |
| 2025– | Wigan Athletic | 36 | (4) |

International career
| 2017–2018 | Scotland U19 | 5 | (0) |
- * Club domestic league appearances and goals as of 13:43, 2 October 2026 (UTC)

Fraser Stuart Murray (born 7 May 1999) is a Scottish footballer who plays as a midfielder for EFL League One club Wigan Athletic.

== Club career ==
=== Hibernian ===
Murray was given his first team debut for Hibernian in a 2016–17 Scottish Challenge Cup tie against Highland League club Turriff United, in September 2016. He scored the first goal in a 3–0 win for Hibs. Later in the season, he made his league debut in a 3–2 win against Raith Rovers.

During October 2018, Murray signed a contract with Hibernian that was due to run until the summer of 2023.

In September 2020, Murray joined Scottish Championship side Dunfermline Athletic on a season-long loan. Murray scored his first goals for Dunfermline in a 3–0 win at Kilmarnock on 13 October.

=== Kilmarnock ===
On 17 June 2021, Murray signed for Kilmarnock on a two-year deal. On 10 July 2021, Murray scored on his Kilmarnock debut in a 2–0 away win against East Kilbride in the Scottish League Cup.

Kilmarnock announced on 3 June 2025 that Murray had left the club, following the expiry of his contract.

=== Wigan Athletic ===
On 9 June 2025, it was announced that Murray would sign for EFL League One club Wigan Athletic on a 2 year deal on 1 July.

== International career ==
Murray was selected for the Scotland under-19 squad in November 2017. He made five appearances for the under-19 team in total.

== Career statistics ==
As of 22 September 2026

| Club | Season | League | | | National cup (Note: Includes Scottish Cup, FA Cup) | | League cup (Note: Includes Scottish League Cup, EFL Cup) | | Other | | Total | |
| Club | Season | Division | Apps | Goals | Apps | Goals | Apps | Goals | Apps | Goals | Apps | Goals |
|---|---|---|---|---|---|---|---|---|---|---|---|---|
| Hibernian | 2016–17 | Scottish Championship | 2 | 0 | 0 | 0 | 0 | 0 | 1 (Note: Matches for senior team in the Scottish Challenge Cup) | 1 | 3 | 1 |
| Hibernian | 2017–18 | Scottish Premiership | 2 | 0 | 0 | 0 | 4 | 2 | 1 (Note: Matches for development team in the Scottish Challenge Cup) | 1 | 17 | 3 |
| Hibernian | 2018–19 | Scottish Premiership | 6 | 0 | 1 | 0 | 0 | 0 | 1 | 1 | 8 | 1 |
| Hibernian | 2019–20 | Scottish Premiership | 7 | 0 | 2 | 0 | 4 | 1 | 1 | 0 | 14 | 1 |
| Hibernian | Total | | 17 | 0 | 3 | 0 | 8 | 3 | 4 | 3 | 32 | 6 |
| Dunfermline Athletic (loan) | 2020–21 | Scottish Championship | 23 | 4 | 1 | 0 | 6 | 2 | 1 (Note: Appearance in the 2020–21 Scottish Premiership play-offs) | 0 | 31 | 6 |
| Dunfermline Athletic (loan) | Total | | 23 | 4 | 1 | 0 | 6 | 2 | 1 | 0 | 31 | 6 |
| Kilmarnock | 2021–22 | Scottish Championship | 34 | 3 | 1 | 0 | 4 | 2 | 3 | 2 | 42 | 7 |
| Kilmarnock | 2022–23 | Scottish Premiership | 19 | 0 | 3 | 0 | 3 | 1 | — | | 25 | 1 |
| Kilmarnock | 2023–24 | Scottish Premiership | 15 | 0 | 2 | 0 | 4 | 2 | — | | 21 | 2 |
| Kilmarnock | 2024–25 | Scottish Premiership | 33 | 4 | 1 | 0 | 1 | 0 | 4 (Note: Two appearances in UEFA Europa League and two appearances in UEFA Conference League) | 0 | 39 | 4 |
| Kilmarnock | Total | | 101 | 7 | 7 | 0 | 12 | 5 | 7 | 2 | 127 | 14 |
| Wigan Athletic | 2025–26 | EFL League One | 30 | 4 | 3 | 0 | 3 | 1 | 1 (Note: Appearances in EFL Trophy) | 0 | 37 | 5 |
| Wigan Athletic | 2026–27 | EFL League One | 6 | 0 | 0 | 0 | 1 | 0 | 1 | 1 | 8 | 1 |
| Wigan Athletic | Total | | 36 | 4 | 3 | 0 | 4 | 1 | 2 | 1 | 45 | 6 |
| Career total | | | 177 | 15 | 14 | 0 | 30 | 11 | 14 | 6 | 235 | 32 |
