= Danny Whitehall =

English footballer (born 1995)

Personal information
- Full name: Daniel Steven Whitehall
- Date of birth: 8 October 1995 (age 31)
- Place of birth: Liverpool, England
- Height: 6 ft 3 in (1.91 m)
- Position: Forward

Team information
- Current team: Hednesford Town

Youth career
- Liverpool
- 2012–2014: Rochdale

College career
Years	Team	Apps	(Gls)
2015	SIU Edwardsville Cougars		
2015–2018	Hastings College	75	(93)

Senior career*
Years	Team	Apps	(Gls)
2014	Southport	3	(0)
2014	Marine	10	(1)
2014–2015	Prescot Cables	11	(4)
2017	Chattanooga FC	7	(1)
2018	Bugeaters FC	22	(8)
2019–2020	Maidenhead United	36	(13)
2020–2021	Kilmarnock	17	(2)
2021–2023	Eastleigh	81	(23)
2023–2026	Scunthorpe United	121	(53)
2026–	Hednesford Town	0	(0)
- * Club domestic league appearances and goals as of 06:33, 26 September 2026 (UTC)

Daniel Steven Whitehall (born 8 October 1995) is an English professional footballer who plays as a forward for National League North club Hednesford Town.

== Career ==
Born in Liverpool, Whitehall spent his early career with Liverpool and Rochdale. He joined Rochdale at under-18 level following his release from Liverpool.

He began his senior career with Southport, moving to Marine in September 2014. He moved on to Prescot Cables in November 2014.

Whitehall then spent time in the United States, playing college soccer for SIU Edwardsville Cougars and Hastings College, and at club level for Chattanooga FC and Bugeaters FC. At Hastings he won a number of awards and set several records, scoring 93 goals in 75 games.

He returned to England in July 2019 with Maidenhead United, moving to Scottish club Kilmarnock in July 2020 on a six-month contract. He made his debut as a substitute against Hibernian on 1 August 2020. On 8 January 2021, Whitehall extended his contract at Kilmarnock, signing a new deal until the end of the season. He left Kilmarnock at the end of the 2020–21 season.

In August 2021 he signed for Eastleigh.

He was offered a new contract by Eastleigh at the end of the 2022–23 season, instead opting to join recently relegated National League North club Scunthorpe United on a two-year deal active from the expiration of his contract. Following promotion at the end of the 2024–25 season, Whitehall signed a new two-year deal.

In September 2026, Whitehall joined Hednesford Town for an undisclosed fee.

== Personal life ==
His father Steve Whitehall was also a footballer.

== Career statistics ==
As of match played 19 September 2026

Club statistics
Club	Season	League			National cup (Note: Includes FA Cup, Scottish Cup)		League cup (Note: Includes Scottish League Cup, EFL Cup)		Other		Total	
Club	Season	Division	Apps	Goals	Apps	Goals	Apps	Goals	Apps	Goals	Apps	Goals
Southport	2014–15	Conference Premier	3	0	0	0	—		0	0	3	0
Marine	2014–15	NPL Premier Division	10	1	2	1	—		2 (Note: One appearance in the FA Trophy, one appearance in Liverpool Senior Cup.)	0	14	2
Maidenhead United	2019–20	National League	36	13	2	0	—		4 (Note: Three appearances and two goals in the FA Trophy, one appearance and three goals in Berks & Bucks Senior Cup.)	5	42	18
Kilmarnock	2020–21	Scottish Premiership	17	2	0	0	2	2	1 (Note: Appearance in the Scottish Premiership play-offs)	0	20	4
Eastleigh	2021–22	National League	41	11	3	0	—		1 (Note: Appearance(s) in FA Trophy)	0	45	11
Eastleigh	2022–23	National League	40	12	2	1	—		3	2	45	15
Eastleigh	Total		81	23	5	1	—		4	2	90	26
Scunthorpe United	2023–24	National League North	44	21	2	0	—		2	0	48	21
Scunthorpe United	2024–25	National League North	30	14	2	0	—		2 (Note: Appearances in National League North playoffs)	3	34	17
Scunthorpe United	2025–26	National League	40	18	1	0	—		2 (Note: One appearance in FA Trophy, one appearance in National League playoffs)	0	43	18
Scunthorpe United	2026–27	National League	7	0	0	0	—		1 (Note: One appearance in National League Cup)	0	8	0
Scunthorpe United	Total		121	53	5	0	—		7	3	133	56
Hednesford Town	2026–27	National League North	0	0	0	0	—		0	0	0	0
Career total			268	92	14	2	2	2	18	11	300	106

== Honours ==
Scunthorpe United

- National League North play-offs: 2025
