= Brandon Pierrick =

English footballer

Personal information
- Full name: Pierrick Brandon Leroy Keutcha
- Date of birth: 10 December 2001 (age 24)
- Place of birth: Lambeth, England
- Height: 1.82 m (6 ft 0 in)
- Position: Winger

Team information
- Current team: AFC Croydon Athletic

Youth career
- 2010–2019: Crystal Palace

Senior career*
Years	Team	Apps	(Gls)
2019–2021	Crystal Palace	3	(0)
2021	→ Kilmarnock (loan)	5	(0)
2021–2022	Vejle	8	(1)
2023	Dover Athletic	14	(1)
2023–2025	AFC Croydon Athletic	98	(48)
2025	Tonbridge Angels	12	(2)
2025–	AFC Croydon Athletic	7	(6)
- * Club domestic league appearances and goals as of 17:05, 21 October 2025 (UTC)

Pierrick Brandon Leroy Keutcha (born 10 December 2001), known as Brandon Pierrick, is an English professional footballer who plays as a winger for AFC Croydon Athletic. He is a product of the Crystal Palace youth system.

== Playing career ==
Pierrick began his career in the Crystal Palace Academy at the age of eight. He signed his first professional contract on his 18th birthday, and became the club's second-youngest Premier League debutant the following month. On 1 January 2020, he came off the bench in a 1–1 draw against Norwich City and started the move that led to Palace's late equaliser.

Pierrick then started in a 1–0 FA Cup Third Round defeat to Derby County four days later, before returning to regular action for the Under-23s. He made one further appearance during the 2019–20 season, coming off the bench for the final six minutes of a 4–0 defeat at Liverpool.

On 1 February 2021, Pierrick joined Scottish Premiership club Kilmarnock on loan until the end of the season.

In July 2021, Pierrick joined Danish Superliga club Vejle. In April 2022, Pierrick left the club after mutually agreeing to terminate his contract.

On 23 February 2023, Pierrick signed for National League South side Dover Athletic.

On 4 August 2023, Pierrick signed for AFC Croydon Athletic.

In July 2025, Pierrick joined National League South side Tonbridge Angels. He returned to AFC Croydon Athletic in October 2025.

== Personal life ==
Pierrick is of Cameroonian descent and grew up in Brixton.

== Career statistics ==
As of match played 29 April 2023

Appearances and goals by club, season and competition
Club	Season	League			FA Cup		League Cup		Other		Total	
Club	Season	Division	Apps	Goals	Apps	Goals	Apps	Goals	Apps	Goals	Apps	Goals
Crystal Palace	2019–20	Premier League	2	0	1	0	0	0	—		3	0
Crystal Palace	2020–21	Premier League	0	0	0	0	0	0	—		0	0
Crystal Palace	Total		2	0	1	0	0	0	0	0	3	0
Kilmarnock (loan)	2020–21	Scottish Premiership	3	0	0	0	0	0	—		3	0
Vejle	2021–22	Danish Superliga	3	0	2	0	0	0	0	0	5	0
Dover Athletic	2022–23	National League South	14	1	—		—		0	0	14	1
Career total			21	1	3	0	0	0	0	0	24	1
