= Kyle Lafferty =

Northern Irish footballer

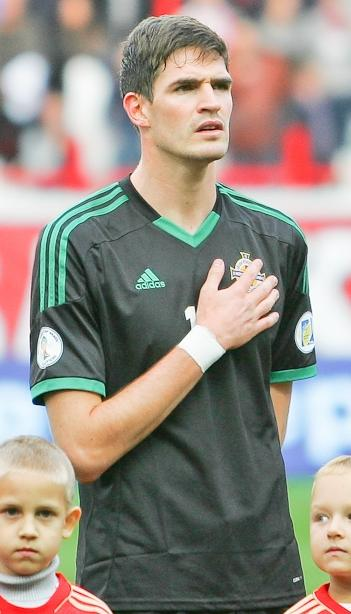
- Lafferty playing for Northern Ireland in 2012

Personal information
- Full name: Kyle Joseph George Lafferty
- Date of birth: 16 September 1987 (age 39)
- Place of birth: Enniskillen, Northern Ireland
- Height: 6 ft 4 in (1.93 m)
- Position: Forward

Team information
- Current team: Forth Wanderers
- Number: 18

Youth career
- 2004–2005: Burnley

Senior career*
Years	Team	Apps	(Gls)
2005–2008	Burnley	83	(10)
2006	→ Darlington (loan)	9	(3)
2008–2012	Rangers	104	(31)
2012–2013	Sion	25	(5)
2013–2014	Palermo	34	(11)
2014–2017	Norwich City	31	(2)
2015	→ Çaykur Rizespor (loan)	14	(2)
2016	→ Birmingham City (loan)	6	(1)
2017–2018	Heart of Midlothian	37	(13)
2018–2019	Rangers	21	(4)
2019	Sarpsborg 08	9	(1)
2020	Sunderland	11	(2)
2020	Reggina	9	(1)
2021	Kilmarnock	9	(8)
2021	Anorthosis Famagusta	5	(0)
2022–2023	Kilmarnock	26	(9)
2023	Linfield	8	(0)
2023–2026	Johnstone Burgh	45	(14)
2026–	Forth Wanderers	6	(5)

International career^{‡}
	Northern Ireland U17	5	(0)
	Northern Ireland U19	6	(1)
2006	Northern Ireland U21	2	(0)
2006–2022	Northern Ireland	89	(20)
- * Club domestic league appearances and goals as of 15:38, 29 July 2023 (UTC) ‡ National team caps and goals as of 22:50, 16 February 2022 (UTC)

Kyle Joseph George Lafferty (born 16 September 1987) is a Northern Irish professional footballer who plays as a striker for side Forth Wanderers F.C. in the West of Scotland League Second Division.

Lafferty began his professional career with English side Burnley F.C., where he made 89 appearances. He signed for Rangers F.C. in 2008 for £3.25 million with whom he won three Scottish Premier League titles, the Scottish Cup once and the Scottish League Cup twice. In 2012 Lafferty chose not to transfer over to the new company, moving to Switzerland's FC Sion. He signed for Serie B club Palermo in 2013 and helped them to promotion as champions in his only season before joining Norwich City. He spent time on loan with Turkish club Çaykur Rizespor and back in England with Birmingham City.

After just over a year back in Scotland with Heart of Midlothian F.C., Lafferty re-signed for Rangers in August 2018, and since has had short spells with Sarpsborg 08 FF, Sunderland A.F.C., Reggina 1914, Kilmarnock F.C. and Anorthosis Famagusta FC. In January 2022, he returned to Kilmarnock, joining the club for the second time. He then returned to his native Northern Ireland to play for Linfield F.C. for a short while, before dropping down to the Scottish seventh tier to play for Johnstone Burgh F.C..

He made his first international appearance for Northern Ireland in 2006 and earned more than 80 caps, representing the team at UEFA Euro 2016. With 20 goals he is the team's second highest scorer of all time, behind former strike partner David Healy on 36.

== Club career ==
=== Burnley ===
In 2004, Lafferty signed a youth team apprenticeship with Championship club Burnley. The following season saw him begin to make an impression upon the Burnley first team. He made his debut during a 2–1 away league defeat to Crewe Alexandra on 6 August 2005, coming on as an 89th-minute substitute for Garreth O'Connor.

In January 2006, Lafferty joined Darlington on loan. He went on to make nine appearances and net three goals for the club, including a scoring debut against Notts County on 7 January. He returned to Burnley in February 2007.

He scored his first senior goal for Burnley against Luton Town, netting the equaliser for a 1–1 draw on 30 April 2006. Lafferty played 89 times and scored 10 goals during his time at Burnley.

=== Rangers ===
On 16 June 2008, Burnley accepted a bid from Rangers of £3 million plus Alan Gow but talks with Gow over his move to Turf Moor broke down. Lafferty moved to Rangers on 19 June after the transfer offer was readjusted to write Gow out of the deal. He made his Rangers debut as an 89th-minute substitute during a UEFA Champions League qualifier on 5 August 2008 against FBK Kaunas. His first goal came in his second appearance, in a Scottish Premier League match against Heart of Midlothian on 16 August 2008.

On 16 May 2009, during the penultimate league match of the 2008–09 season at home to Aberdeen, Lafferty was involved in an off-the-ball altercation with Aberdeen player Charlie Mulgrew which ended with Lafferty reacting as if he had been headbutted. The referee, Stuart Dougal, sent Mulgrew off for violent conduct; however, television pictures showed little contact between the two players. Rangers went on to win the match 2–1. Upon reviewing the incident Rangers manager Walter Smith expressed his disappointment at Lafferty's conduct. Two days later it was reported that Rangers had fined Lafferty for his reactions in relation to the incident. The case was also referred to the Scottish Football Association's disciplinary committee, who rescinded Mulgrew's red card and gave Lafferty a two-match ban for simulation.

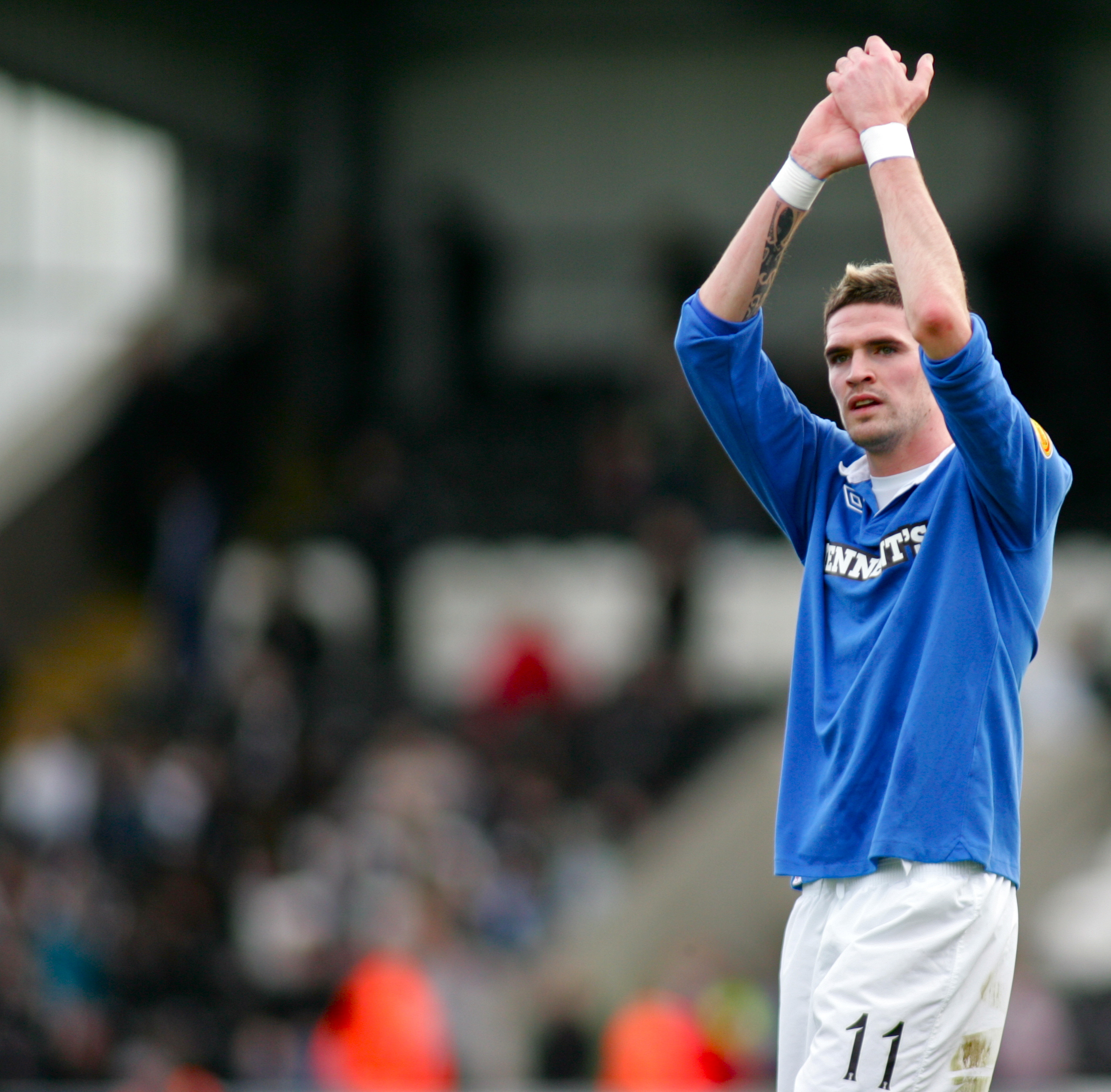
Lafferty with Rangers in November 2010

On 25 April 2010, Lafferty scored the winning goal in a 1–0 win over Hibernian at Easter Road, securing the league title for Rangers with three matches left to play. On 22 August, Lafferty was sent off, along with opponent Kevin McBride, in a match at the same venue. On 25 September, Lafferty scored his first hat-trick for the club in a 7–2 victory over Dunfermline Athletic in the League Cup. Lafferty scored in Rangers' 4–0 win over Dundee United in April 2011, before missing an opportunity in the final Old Firm game of the 2010–11 season at Ibrox in a 0–0 draw. Lafferty then went on to score in three consecutive games in the title run in against Motherwell, Hearts and Dundee United. Lafferty then scored a hat-trick in the final SPL game of the season as Rangers beat Kilmarnock 5–1 and won their third consecutive league title.

On 18 September 2011, Lafferty scored his first Old Firm goal in a 4–2 win against Celtic. On 17 December, Lafferty scored an 83rd-minute winner for Rangers against Inverness Caledonian Thistle, the game ending 2–1. On 24 April 2012, Ally McCoist announced that Lafferty had been banned for two weeks following a training ground bust up.

In June 2012, Lafferty lodged an objection against his contract being transferred from Rangers to the new company set up by Charles Green. PFA Scotland had previously commented that players were entitled to become free agents if they objected to the transfer. Lafferty later raised a constructive dismissal claim against Rangers.

=== Sion ===
Lafferty signed a three-year contract with Swiss Super League club FC Sion on 30 June 2012, linking up with former Rangers player and Sion player-coach Gennaro Gattuso. He was unable to play in the league match against Grasshoppers on 15 July because the Scottish Football Association refused to provide clearance for the transfer, having received an objection from Rangers' owner Charles Green. On 20 July, Lafferty received provisional international clearance from FIFA which allowed him to play while arbitration over his move from Rangers continued. On 22 July 2012, Lafferty made his debut for Sion, coming on as a substitute in a 1–0 win over Servette. He scored his first goal a week later in a 3–0 win over Luzern.

=== Palermo ===
On 26 June 2013, Lafferty joined Serie B club Palermo on a three-year contract for an undisclosed fee. He said "Palermo tried to sign me in January but unfortunately we couldn't close the deal. Now I can't wait to get started. When I was younger I watched a lot of Italian football and I know there's a very passionate fanbase here at Palermo."

He scored 11 goals in 34 matches to help the club ascend to Serie A as champions in his only season, and won the Fans Player of the Season award. However, club president Maurizio Zamparini called him an "out-of-control womaniser" and claimed that this lifestyle resulted in him being sold.

=== Norwich City ===
On 27 June 2014, Lafferty signed a three-year contract with Norwich City of the Football League Championship with an option for an extra year. The transfer fee was undisclosed and the transfer would be effective from 1 July. He said "Norwich is a team that wants to get promoted back to the Premier League at the first opportunity, so I'm excited to come here and start playing football for a team like this." He was given squad number 9.

Lafferty made his debut for the team on 10 August, as they began the season with a 1–0 defeat away to Wolverhampton Wanderers, replacing Steven Whittaker for the last 14 minutes of the game. Six days later he made his first start in his first game at Carrow Road, lasting 67 minutes of a 3–0 win over Watford before being replaced by Elliott Bennett. In 20 games – 18 of those in the league – he only scored once, in a 3–2 home win against Cardiff City on 17 January 2015.

On 2 February 2015, Lafferty was loaned to Süper Lig club Çaykur Rizespor for the remainder of the campaign. He scored two goals in 14 league games for the Turkish side.

Norwich had been promoted to the Premier League during Lafferty's absence. He scored his first goal of the 2015–16 season in a 3–0 League Cup victory against West Bromwich Albion, but found regular games hard to come by. In November 2015, Leeds United head coach Steve Evans revealed he had inquired about the availability of Lafferty on loan. However, Lafferty remained with Norwich until 24 March 2016, when he joined Championship club Birmingham City on loan until the end of the season.

He returned from international duty with a groin injury, but was fit to start Birmingham's match against Brighton & Hove Albion on 5 April. He opened the scoring after 16 minutes with a tap-in following a goalkeeping error, but Brighton went on to win 2–1. He made five more league appearances, without scoring, in what remained of the season.

In May 2017, it was announced that Lafferty would be released when his contract expired.

=== Hearts ===
On 28 June 2017, Lafferty joined Heart of Midlothian in the Scottish Premiership on a two-year deal. He made his debut on 18 July in the group stage of the Scottish League Cup, scoring the only goal away to Elgin City. Two days later, he added two more goals in a 3–0 win over East Fife at Tynecastle, and on 25 July he made it four goals in three games with one in a 2–1 loss at Peterhead; Hearts did not reach the knockout stage.

In the league season, Lafferty scored 12 times as Hearts finished 6th; this made him the Premiership's fourth highest scorer. One of these was on 17 December 2017 in a 4–0 win over defending champions Celtic, ending their 69-match unbeaten run in domestic matches. Thirteen days later, he was sent off at the end of a goalless draw at Aberdeen for a challenge on Graeme Shinnie.

=== Return to Rangers ===
On 22 August 2018, Lafferty returned to Rangers for a second spell on a two-year deal. On his return to Rangers, Lafferty scored two goals in his league debut against Motherwell, a dramatic 3–3 draw. Lafferty left Rangers after having his contract terminated by mutual consent on 24 July 2019.

=== Sarpsborg 08 ===
On 27 August 2019, Lafferty signed for Norwegian Eliteserien club Sarpsborg 08 on a contract until the end of the 2019 season.

=== Sunderland ===
Lafferty signed a short-term contract with Sunderland on 10 January 2020. He scored twice from 11 League One appearances before leaving the club when his contract expired.

=== Reggina ===
In July 2020, Lafferty moved to Italy to sign for Reggina. He scored once in nine Serie B matches and played twice in the Coppa Italia before being released by mutual consent in January 2021.

=== Kilmarnock ===
Lafferty returned to Scottish football in February 2021, signing a short-term contract with Kilmarnock. He had an immediate impact with Kilmarnock, scoring 12 goals in the space of eight games. This included a hat-trick in a 3–0 win against Dundee United on 21 April that lifted the club out of the relegation places. Kilmarnock eventually finished 11th and were relegated after they lost a play-off with Dundee. Lafferty left Kilmarnock at the end of his contract, having scored 13 goals in as many appearances for the club.

=== Anorthosis Famagusta ===
Lafferty then signed a season-long deal with Cypriot club Anorthosis Famagusta. Lafferty agreed to mutually terminate his contract in December 2021.

=== Kilmarnock return ===
On 21 January 2022, Lafferty returned to Kilmarnock, signing a deal until the end of the season. This contract was subsequently extended until the summer of 2023.

=== Linfield ===
On 8 February 2023, Lafferty signed a short-term deal with NIFL Premiership club Linfield until the end of the season. He would leave at the end of the season following a disappointing end to the season.

=== Johnstone Burgh ===
On 12 July 2023, Lafferty joined Scottish seventh tier club Johnstone Burgh on a two-year deal, joining ex-Rangers and Norwich City teammate Graham Dorrans at the club. After scoring twice on his debut, he suffered a serious knee injury in his second match, keeping him out of action until 2024.

On 1 June 2025, Lafferty scored the winning penalty against Tranent which won Burgh their first Scottish Junior Cup since 1968.

== International career ==
In early 2006, Lafferty represented Northern Ireland under-19s at the Milk Cup. He impressed during the tournament, scoring in his first game against Paraguay, but Northern Ireland lost the match 3–1. Later in 2006, he received his first senior Northern Ireland call-up on a post-season trip to the United States to play friendly games against Romania and Uruguay. Lafferty scored his first Northern Ireland goal in an away friendly against Finland the following year. He featured predominantly as the second striker alongside David Healy during Northern Ireland's Euro 2008 qualification group, and he scored his first competitive international goal in a 4–1 victory over group minnows Liechtenstein. He then secured a 1–1 draw away to Sweden, scoring Northern Ireland's equaliser in the second half.

On 26 March 2008, he scored twice in an international match for the first time, in a friendly against Georgia which Northern Ireland won 4–1.

Lafferty scored in all of Northern Ireland's first three matches in UEFA Euro 2016 qualifying, against Hungary, the Faroe Islands and Greece, the first time that the nation won the first three matches of any qualification campaign. He added a brace on 29 March 2015 in a 2–1 home win over Finland.

On 4 September, Lafferty scored once for Northern Ireland in a 3–1 win against the Faroe Islands. The result put Northern Ireland at the top of Group F and on the brink of qualifying for their first European Championship. In the following game, against Hungary three days later, he scored a stoppage-time equaliser in a 1–1 draw to keep Northern Ireland top of their group. Lafferty ended the qualifying phase with seven goals, which made him Northern Ireland's top scorer as the team qualified as group winners. On 27 May 2016, Lafferty marked his 50th international appearance with a goal in a 3–0 win over Belarus in a friendly at Windsor Park, Belfast.

After Lafferty withdrew from the Northern Ireland squad for two UEFA Nations League matches in October 2018, the Irish Football Association invoked a FIFA rule to prevent him from playing for Rangers in their next league game.

== Personal life ==
Lafferty was the victim of multiple counts of vandalism while at Rangers.

He had a son, born in 2011, with former Miss Scotland Nicola Mimnagh. They married at St Margaret's Roman Catholic Church, in Johnstone, Renfrewshire, in June 2012, before divorcing. Lafferty married model and former Miss Scotland contestant Vanessa Chung at Gleneagles Hotel in May 2016. The couple had their first born daughter in 2018 and another daughter in 2020.

In August 2016, Lafferty accepted a misconduct charge from the Football Association in relation to football betting, and was fined £23,000.

In September 2022, Kilmarnock launched an investigation after video evidence emerged of Lafferty apparently making a sectarian remark in a nightclub. He subsequently withdrew from the Northern Ireland squad preparing for two international matches.

== Career statistics ==
=== Club statistics ===
As of match played 2 August 2024

Appearances and goals by club, season and competition
Club	Season	League			National Cup		League Cup		Other		Total	
Club	Season	Division	Apps	Goals	Apps	Goals	Apps	Goals	Apps	Goals	Apps	Goals
Burnley	2005–06	Championship	11	1	—		1	0	—		12	1
Burnley	2006–07	Championship	35	4	1	0	1	0	—		37	4
Burnley	2007–08	Championship	37	5	1	0	2	0	—		40	5
Burnley	Total		83	10	2	0	4	0	0	0	89	10
Darlington (loan)	2005–06	League Two	9	3	—		—		—		9	3
Rangers	2008–09	Scottish Premier League	25	6	3	2	3	1	1 (Note: Appearance(s) in UEFA Champions League)	0	32	9
Rangers	2009–10	Scottish Premier League	28	7	5	0	2	0	4	0	39	7
Rangers	2010–11	Scottish Premier League	31	11	2	1	3	3	8 (Note: Four appearances in UEFA Champions League, four in UEFA Europa League)	0	44	15
Rangers	2011–12	Scottish Premier League	20	7	0	0	1	0	2 (Note: Appearance(s) in UEFA Europa League)	0	23	7
Rangers	Total		104	31	10	3	9	4	15	0	138	38
Sion	2012–13	Swiss Super League	25	5	3	3	—		—		28	8
Palermo	2013–14	Serie B	34	11	2	1	—		—		36	12
Norwich City	2014–15	Championship	18	1	1	0	1	0	—		20	1
Norwich City	2015–16	Premier League	1	0	1	0	1	1	—		3	1
Norwich City	2016–17	Championship	12	1	2	0	2	1	—		16	2
Norwich City	Total		31	2	4	0	4	2	0	0	39	4
Çaykur Rizespor (loan)	2014–15	Süper Lig	14	2	1	0	—		—		15	2
Birmingham City (loan)	2015–16	Championship	6	1	—		—		—		6	1
Heart of Midlothian	2017–18	Scottish Premiership	35	12	2	3	4	4	—		41	19
Heart of Midlothian	2018–19	Scottish Premiership	2	1	0	0	5	0	—		7	1
Heart of Midlothian	Total		37	13	2	3	9	4	0	0	48	20
Rangers	2018–19	Scottish Premiership	21	4	0	0	0	0	5	1	26	5
Sarpsborg 08	2019	Eliteserien	9	1	0	0	0	0	0	0	9	1
Sunderland	2019–20	League One	11	2	—		—		—		11	2
Reggina	2020–21	Serie B	9	1	2	0	—		—		11	1
Kilmarnock	2020–21	Scottish Premiership	9	8	2	4	—		2 (Note: Appearance(s) in the Scottish Premiership play-offs)	1	13	13
Anorthosis Famagusta	2021–22	Cypriot First Division	5	0	0	0	—		6 (Note: Appearance(s) in the Cypriot Super Cup, UEFA Europa League and UEFA Europa Conference League)	1	11	1
Kilmarnock	2021–22	Scottish Championship	14	8	1	0	—		0	0	15	8
Kilmarnock	2022–23	Scottish Premiership	12	1	1	0	4	2	—		17	5
Kilmarnock	Total		26	9	2	0	4	2	0	0	32	13
Linfield	2022–23	NIFL Premiership	8	0	—		0	0	—		8	0
Johnstone Burgh	2023-24	West of Scotland League First Division	2	2	0	0	0	0	—		2	2
Career total			443	107	30	14	30	12	23	3	531	138

=== International ===
==== Statistics ====
As of match played 12 June 2022

Appearances and goals by national team and year
National team	Year	Apps	Goals
Northern Ireland	2006	7	1
Northern Ireland	2007	7	2
Northern Ireland	2008	5	3
Northern Ireland	2009	4	1
Northern Ireland	2010	5	1
Northern Ireland	2011	2	0
Northern Ireland	2012	5	1
Northern Ireland	2013	1	0
Northern Ireland	2014	5	3
Northern Ireland	2015	6	4
Northern Ireland	2016	12	4
Northern Ireland	2017	8	0
Northern Ireland	2018	3	0
Northern Ireland	2019	5	0
Northern Ireland	2020	4	0
Northern Ireland	2021	6	0
Northern Ireland	2022	4	0
Total		89	20

==== Goals ====
As of match played 5 September 2021
Northern Ireland score listed first, score column indicates score after each Lafferty goal

International goals by date, venue, cap, opponent, score, result and competition
No.	Date	Venue	Cap	Opponent	Score	Result	Competition
1	16 August 2006	Helsinki Olympic Stadium, Helsinki, Finland	3	Finland	2–0	2–1	Friendly
2	22 August 2007	Windsor Park, Belfast, Northern Ireland	11	Liechtenstein	3–0	3–1	UEFA Euro 2008 qualifying
3	17 October 2007	Råsunda Stadium, Solna, Sweden	13	Sweden	1–1	1–1	UEFA Euro 2008 qualifying
4	26 March 2008	Windsor Park, Belfast, Northern Ireland	16	Georgia	1–0	4–1	Friendly
5	26 March 2008	Windsor Park, Belfast, Northern Ireland	16	Georgia	3–0	4–1	Friendly
6	15 October 2008	Windsor Park, Belfast, Northern Ireland	18	San Marino	3–0	4–0	2010 FIFA World Cup qualification
7	5 September 2009	Silesian Stadium, Chorzów, Poland	22	Poland	1–0	1–1	2010 FIFA World Cup qualification
8	12 October 2010	Svangaskarð, Toftir, Faroe Islands	28	Faroe Islands	1–1	1–1	UEFA Euro 2012 qualifying
9	15 August 2012	Windsor Park, Belfast, Northern Ireland	31	Finland	2–0	3–3	Friendly
10	7 September 2014	Groupama Arena, Budapest, Hungary	38	Hungary	2–1	2–1	UEFA Euro 2016 qualifying
11	11 October 2014	Windsor Park, Belfast, Northern Ireland	39	Faroe Islands	2–0	2–0	UEFA Euro 2016 qualifying
12	14 October 2014	Karaiskakis Stadium, Piraeus, Greece	40	Greece	2–0	2–0	UEFA Euro 2016 qualifying
13	29 March 2015	Windsor Park, Belfast, Northern Ireland	42	Finland	1–0	2–1	UEFA Euro 2016 qualifying
14	29 March 2015	Windsor Park, Belfast, Northern Ireland	42	Finland	2–0	2–1	UEFA Euro 2016 qualifying
15	4 September 2015	Tórsvøllur, Tórshavn, Faroe Islands	44	Faroe Islands	3–1	3–1	UEFA Euro 2016 qualifying
16	7 September 2015	Windsor Park, Belfast, Northern Ireland	45	Hungary	1–1	1–1	UEFA Euro 2016 qualifying
17	27 May 2016	Windsor Park, Belfast, Northern Ireland	50	Belarus	1–0	3–0	Friendly
18	8 October 2016	Windsor Park, Belfast, Northern Ireland	53	San Marino	2–0	4–0	2018 FIFA World Cup qualification
19	8 October 2016	Windsor Park, Belfast, Northern Ireland	53	San Marino	4–0	4–0	2018 FIFA World Cup qualification
20	11 November 2016	Windsor Park, Belfast, Northern Ireland	54	Azerbaijan	1–0	4–0	2018 FIFA World Cup qualification

== Honours ==
Rangers

- Scottish Premier League: 2008–09, 2009–10, 2010–11
- Scottish Cup: 2008–09
- Scottish League Cup: 2009–10, 2010–11

Palermo

- Serie B: 2013–14

Kilmarnock

- Scottish Championship: 2021–22

Johnstone Burgh

- Scottish Junior Cup: 2024–25
