= Innes Cameron =

Scottish footballer (born 2000)

Personal information
- Full name: Innes Baker Cameron
- Date of birth: 22 August 2000 (age 26)
- Place of birth: Oban, Scotland
- Height: 1.90 m (6 ft 3 in)
- Position: Striker

Team information
- Current team: Barrow
- Number: 18

Youth career
- 2014–2016: Kilmarnock

Senior career*
Years	Team	Apps	(Gls)
2016–2025	Kilmarnock	59	(4)
2018–2019	→ Stranraer (loan)	29	(10)
2020	→ Ayr United (loan)	5	(1)
2021	→ Alloa Athletic (loan)	15	(6)
2021–2022	→ Queen of the South (loan)	10	(3)
2022	→ Queen of the South (loan)	13	(0)
2025–	Barrow	22	(3)
2026	→ Raith Rovers (loan)	9	(5)

International career^{‡}
2017	Scotland U17	8	(1)
- * Club domestic league appearances and goals as of 16:14, 27 September 2026 (UTC) ‡ National team caps and goals as of 17:00, 30 January 2019 (UTC)

Innes Baker Cameron (born 22 August 2000) is a Scottish professional footballer who plays as a striker for National League club Barrow. Cameron has also played for Stranraer, Ayr United, Alloa Athletic, Queen of the South and Raith Rovers in various loan spells.

== Club career ==
=== Kilmarnock ===
Cameron was born in Oban, but raised in Troon. He started his senior career with Kilmarnock in the 2016–17 season. In September 2018, Cameron was loaned out to Stranraer alongside Daniel Higgins and scored on his debut.

In October 2020, Cameron was then loaned out to Ayr United and in January 2021, he was loaned to Alloa Athletic until 31 May 2021.

On 30 September 2021, Cameron was loaned out to Queen of the South although on 13 January 2022, Cameron was recalled by Kilmarnock's new manager Derek McInnes, due to the club having injuries to several key players. On 31 January 2022, Cameron returned to Queen of the South on loan for the rest of the 2021–22 season.

=== Barrow ===
On 2 June 2025, Cameron agreed to join EFL League Two side Barrow on a two-year deal from 1 July.

On 2 February 2026, he joined Raith Rovers on loan for the remainder of the season. He scored two goals in the 2026 Scottish Challenge Cup final.

Upon his return to Barrow, at the start of the 2026–27 season he praised the club's training regime.

== International career ==
Cameron has represented Scotland at under-17 level.

== Personal life ==
Cameron is nicknamed "Big Innes", a name also associated with the character of the same name, portrayed by Clive Russell in the Scottish television sitcom Still Game. In May 2024, Kilmarnock used a clip from the programme in its announcement of Cameron's contract extension.

== Career statistics ==
As of 15 September 2026

Appearances and goals by club, season and competition
Club	Season	League			National Cup		League Cup		Other		Total	
Club	Season	Division	Apps	Goals	Apps	Goals	Apps	Goals	Apps	Goals	Apps	Goals
Kilmarnock	2016–17	Scottish Premiership	2	0	0	0	0	0	0	0	2	0
Kilmarnock	2017–18	Scottish Premiership	3	0	0	0	0	0	0	0	3	0
Kilmarnock	2018–19	Scottish Premiership	0	0	0	0	0	0	1 (Note: Appearance(s) in the Scottish Challenge Cup)	0	1	0
Kilmarnock	2019–20	Scottish Premiership	1	0	0	0	1	0	2 (Note: One appearance in the UEFA Europa League, one appearance in the Scottish Challenge Cup)	0	4	0
Kilmarnock	2020–21	Scottish Premiership	0	0	0	0	1	0	0	0	1	0
Kilmarnock	2021–22	Scottish Championship	6	1	0	0	5	1	1	0	12	2
Kilmarnock	2022–23	Scottish Premiership	16	1	0	0	5	1	1	0	22	2
Kilmarnock	2023–24	Scottish Premiership	10	1	1	0	5	2	0	0	16	3
Kilmarnock	2024–25	Scottish Premiership	21	1	0	0	0	0	1 (Note: Appearance in the UEFA Europa League.)	0	22	1
Kilmarnock	Total		59	4	1	0	17	4	6	0	83	8
Stranraer (loan)	2018–19	Scottish League One	29	10	1	0	0	0	0	0	30	10
Ayr United (loan)	2020–21	Scottish Championship	5	1	0	0	1	0	0	0	6	1
Alloa Athletic (loan)	2020–21	Scottsih Championship	15	6	0	0	0	0	0	0	15	6
Queen of the South (loan)	2021–22	Scottish Championship	23	3	0	0	0	0	0	0	23	3
Barrow	2025–26	EFL League Two	14	0	0	0	1	0	3 (Note: Appearances in the EFL Trophy)	1	18	1
Barrow	2026–27	National League	8	3	0	0	0	0	0	0	8	3
Barrow	Total		22	3	0	0	1	0	3	1	26	3
Raith Rovers (loan)	2025–26	Scottish Championship	9	5	0	0	0	0	2	2	11	7
Career total			162	32	2	0	19	4	11	3	194	39

== Honours ==
Raith Rovers

- Scottish Challenge Cup: 2025–26
