= Diaguely Dabo =

French association football player (born 1992)

Personal information
- Date of birth: 26 August 1992 (age 34)
- Place of birth: Saint-Denis, France
- Height: 1.89 m (6 ft 2 in)
- Position: Defensive midfielder

Team information
- Current team: Stade Poitevin
- Number: 6

Youth career
- 2001-2006: Saint-Denis US
- 2006-2007: AAS Sarcelles
- 2007-2008: Saint-Leu 95 FC
- 2008–2010: Lorient

Senior career*
Years	Team	Apps	(Gls)
2010–2012	Lorient II	32	(0)
2012–2013	Cannes	11	(0)
2013–2014	Sénart-Moissy	19	(1)
2014–2015	Beauvais	20	(0)
2015–2016	Dieppe	29	(1)
2016–2017	Épinal	29	(0)
2017–2018	Laval	19	(1)
2018–2019	Avranches	25	(0)
2020	Stevenage	8	(0)
2020–2021	Kilmarnock	6	(0)
2022	Angoulême	12	(0)
2022–2024	Olympique Alès	49	(1)
2024	Beauvais	1	(0)
2024–2025	Thonon Evian	18	(1)
2025–	Stade Poitevin	10	(0)
- * Club domestic league appearances and goals as of 4 December 2025

Diaguely Dabo (born 26 August 1992) is a French professional footballer who plays as a defensive midfielder for Stade Poitevin.

After playing in several youth academies in France, Dabo joined Lorient's academy from under-17 level, progressing to play for the reserve team in the Championnat National 2 for two years from 2010 to 2012. He joined Cannes in 2012 and spent the 2012–13 season there. A drop in division followed, joining Sénart-Moissy for one season, before returning to Championnat National 2 club Beauvais in 2014. Dabo then signed for divisional rivals Dieppe a year later; his performances there earned him a move to Épinal of the Championnat National in 2016 and he spent one year there.

Dabo then spent the 2017–18 season at Laval and a further year at Avranches. Dabo travelled to England to earn a contract playing in the English Football League, and subsequently signed for English League Two club Stevenage in January 2020. He left Stevenage at the end of the 2019–20 season. Dabo joined Scottish Premiership team Kilmarnock in December 2020 following a successful trial period, where he spent the remainder of the 2020–21 season. After returning to France he played for Angoulême, Olympique Alès, Beauvais and Thonon Evian Grand Genève.

== Early life ==
Dabo was born in Saint-Denis. He is of Malian descent.

== Career ==
=== France ===
Dabo began playing for the youth team of Saint-Denis at the Saint-Denis Union Sport academy at the age of nine. He played there until he reached 13 ans level, subsequently joining the AAS Sarcelles 14 ans fédéraux team for one season. He then spent one with the 16 ans nationaux of Saint-Leu 95 Football Club. It was at Saint-Leu where Dabo was scouted by Lorient. He subsequently enrolled in Lorient's academy and progressed from 16 ans level to playing for Lorient II in the Championnat National 2. Dabo made 32 league appearances from 2010 to 2012 for Lorient's reserve team, also training with the club's first-team.

Ahead of the 2012–13 season, Dabo signed for Cannes, also competing in Championnat National 2. He made his Cannes debut in a 2–0 home victory against Valence on 18 August 2012, coming on as a 57th-minute substitute in the match. Dabo made 11 appearances during the season. A transfer to Championnat National 3 club Sénart-Moissy followed for the 2013–14 season. He played 19 times for Sénart-Moissy during the season, scoring his first goal in senior football in the club's 2–0 victory against Olympique Saint-Quentin on 1 February 2014.

He signed for Beauvais of the Championnat National 2 ahead of the 2014–15 season, where he played 22 times in all competitions, before joining divisional rivals Dieppe. Dabo played regularly during the 2015–16 season at Dieppe, scoring one goal in 29 appearances. His performances at Dieppe earned him a transfer to Championnat National club Épinal. He played 31 times for Épinal during the 2016–17 season, before joining Laval, also of the third tier of French football, on 14 June 2017. Dabo made 25 appearances throughout the 2017–18 season, scoring once in a 1–1 draw with Grenoble Foot 38 on 18 November 2017. Having not played for Laval at the start of the 2018–19 season, Dabo joined Championnat National club Avranches on a free transfer on 27 August 2018 and played 26 times that season, with the club finishing in eighth place in the league standings.

=== Stevenage ===
Without a club during the first half of the 2019–20 season, Dabo travelled to England and spent time on trial with League Two club Stevenage in January 2020. He trained with the Stevenage first-team for two days and signed a one-match contract on 17 January 2020, enabling him to play in the club's match against Cambridge United. He played the whole 90 minutes in the club's 4–0 away victory, Stevenage's first win since October 2019. After the game, he signed a "longer" contract. Dabo played nine times over the next two months, before the League Two regular season was curtailed in March 2020 due to the COVID-19 pandemic. He left Stevenage at the end of the season.

=== Kilmarnock ===
Dabo trialled with Scottish Premiership club Kilmarnock for one week and subsequently signed for the club on a contract for the remainder of the 2020–21 season on 31 December 2020. He debuted as a 79th-minute substitute for Kilmarnock in a 2–0 victory against Hamilton Academical on 9 January 2021. After making six appearances, of which five were from the substitute's bench, Dabo left Kilmarnock at the end of the 2020–21 season.

=== Return to France ===
Having been a free agent during the first half of the 2021–22 season, Dabo signed for Championnat National 2 club Angoulême on 31 January 2022.

On 22 June 2022 Olympique Alès confirmed, that Dabo had joined the club He later played for Beauvais and Thonon Evian Grand Genève.

== Style of play ==
Dabo started his career playing as a defender, before moving into a defensive midfield role. He stated he was inspired to play in defensive midfield after watching Patrick Vieira and Abou Diaby, having been told he had a similar build and profile to the players. Upon signing for Kilmarnock, manager Alex Dyer described Dabo as being "good on the ball" and "providing athleticism with his ability to get around the pitch".

== Career statistics ==
As of match played 6 March 2021

Club	Season	League			FA Cup		EFL Cup		Other		Total	
Club	Season	Division	Apps	Goals	Apps	Goals	Apps	Goals	Apps	Goals	Apps	Goals
Stevenage	2019–20	League Two	8	0	0	0	0	0	1 (Note: Appearances in EFL Trophy)	0	9	0
Kilmarnock	2020–21	Scottish Premiership	6	0	0	0	0	0	0	0	6	0
Career total			14	0	0	0	0	0	1	0	15	0
