= Calum Waters (footballer) =

Scottish footballer

Personal information
- Full name: Calum Anderson Waters
- Date of birth: 10 March 1996 (age 30)
- Place of birth: Glasgow, Scotland
- Height: 5 ft 8 in (1.73 m)
- Position: Defender

Team information
- Current team: Alloa Athletic
- Number: 3

Youth career
- –2014: Celtic

Senior career*
Years	Team	Apps	(Gls)
2014–2016	Celtic	0	(0)
2015–2016	→ Dumbarton (loan)	16	(0)
2016–2017	Alloa Athletic	36	(1)
2017–2023	Kilmarnock	43	(0)
2018	→ Sligo Rovers (loan)	16	(0)
2019–2020	→ St Mirren (loan)	27	(0)
2023	→ Greenock Morton (loan)	14	(1)
2023–2024	Greenock Morton	24	(0)
2024–	Alloa Athletic	30	(3)

International career^{‡}
2011–2012	Scotland U16	5	(0)
2012–2013	Scotland U17	7	(0)
2014–2015	Scotland U19	7	(0)
- * Club domestic league appearances and goals as of 4 May 2026 ‡ National team caps and goals as of 18:06, 1 July 2015 (UTC)

Calum Anderson Waters (born 10 March 1996) is a Scottish professional defender who plays for Scottish League One club Alloa Athletic. Waters has previously played for Celtic, Dumbarton, Alloa Athletic, Sligo Rovers, St Mirren, Kilmarnock and Greenock Morton.

== Club career ==
Born in Glasgow, Waters started his career with Celtic playing regularly for their development side. He played in Celtic's 5–2 win over Rangers in the Scottish Youth Cup final on 21 May 2015.

He joined Scottish Championship side Dumbarton on loan in July 2015, and made his senior debut for the club in a 3–2 victory over Morton on 25 July 2015. He scored his first senior goal in a 5–0 Scottish Cup victory over Alloa, and also provided an assist for the fifth goal.

He joined Alloa Athletic in May 2016 after leaving Celtic. He scored his first goal for the club – the winner – against Ross County in the Scottish League Cup.

Waters signed for Scottish Premiership club Kilmarnock in June 2017. He was loaned to Irish club Sligo Rovers in February 2018, on a deal due to run until 10 June. Waters was loaned to St Mirren in August 2019.

On 4 February 2023, Waters joined Scottish Championship club Greenock Morton on loan until the end of the season. Following a successful spell at the club, which saw Waters make a total of 14 appearances, scoring one goal, he officially left Kilmarnock on 3 June 2023, before signing on a permanent basis for Greenock Morton just 6 days later.

On 13 June 2024, Waters returned to Alloa Athletic.

== Career statistics ==
As of match played 17 April 2021

Appearances and goals by club, season and competition
Club	Season	League			Scottish Cup		League Cup		Other		Total	
Club	Season	Division	Apps	Goals	Apps	Goals	Apps	Goals	Apps	Goals	Apps	Goals
Celtic	2015–16	Scottish Premiership	0	0	0	0	0	0	0	0	0	0
Dumbarton (loan)	2015–16	Scottish Championship	16	0	2	1	1	0	2 (Note: Appearances in the Scottish Challenge Cup)	0	21	1
Alloa Athletic	2016–17	Scottish League One	36	1	2	0	6	1	7 (Note: Three appearances and one goal in the Scottish Challenge Cup; four appearances in the Championship play-offs)	1	51	3
Kilmarnock	2017–18	Scottish Premiership	5	0	0	0	1	0	1 (Note: Appearances for Kilmarnock under-20s/21s in the Scottish Challenge Cup in which age-restricted sides from the Scottish Premiership clubs compete against senior clubs)	0	7	0
Kilmarnock	2018–19	Scottish Premiership	2	0	1	0	2	0	1	0	6	0
Kilmarnock	2019–20	Scottish Premiership	0	0	0	0	0	0	0	0	0	0
Kilmarnock	2020–21	Scottish Premiership	17	0	1	0	0	0	—		18	0
Kilmarnock	Total		24	0	2	0	3	0	2	0	31	0
Sligo Rovers (loan)	2018	League of Ireland Premier Division	16	0	0	0	1	0	—		17	0
St Mirren (loan)	2019–20	Scottish Premiership	27	0	4	0	0	0	—		31	0
Career total			119	1	10	1	11	1	11	1	153	4
