= Ally Taylor =

Scottish footballer

Personal information
- Date of birth: 12 September 2001 (age 25)
- Place of birth: Greenock, Scotland
- Position: Midfielder

Team information
- Current team: Muirkirk

Youth career
- Kilmarnock

Senior career*
Years	Team	Apps	(Gls)
2020–2021	Kilmarnock	1	(0)
2021	→ Stranraer (loan)	4	(0)
2021–2022	Alloa Athletic	0	(0)
2023–2025	Benburb		
2025	Port Glasgow		
2025–	Muirkirk		
- * Club domestic league appearances and goals as of 12:02, 26 October 2025 (UTC)

Alistair Taylor (born 12 September 2001) is a Scottish professional footballer who plays as a midfielder for Muirkirk.

== Career ==
Born in Greenock, Taylor made his first team debut for Kilmarnock in February 2020, while his brother Greg was playing for their opponents Celtic. On 1 June 2020, he declined a new contract and was due to leave the club. However, on 11 June 2020 he signed a new one-year contract with Kilmarnock. Taylor was loaned to Stranraer in March 2021. He left Kilmarnock at the end of the 2020–21 season.

He joined Alloa Athletic in the summer of 2021 but did not make any appearances and later joined Benburb in the West of Scotland Football League. Following a short spell with Port Glasgow in early 2025, Taylor signed for Muirkirk in August that year.

== Personal life ==
His older brother Greg Taylor is also a footballer.
