= Kyle Connell =

Scottish footballer

Personal information
- Date of birth: 2 August 2001 (age 25)
- Place of birth: Glasgow, Scotland
- Height: 1.86 m (6 ft 1 in)
- Position: Forward

Team information
- Current team: Clyde
- Number: 16

Youth career
- –2017: Motherwell
- 2017–2019: Blackburn Rovers
- 2019–2020: Kilmarnock

Senior career*
Years	Team	Apps	(Gls)
2020–2023	Kilmarnock	2	(1)
2020–2021	→ Airdrieonians (loan)	22	(6)
2021–2022	→ East Fife (loan)	28	(8)
2022–2023	→ Raith Rovers (loan)	20	(2)
2023	East Kilbride	11	(5)
2023–2024	Cove Rangers	31	(5)
2024–	Clyde	58	(8)
- * Club domestic league appearances and goals as of 4 May 2026

Kyle Connell (born 2 August 2001) is a Scottish professional footballer who plays as a forward for Scottish League Two club Clyde. He has also played for Cove Rangers and Kilmarnock, and on loan for Airdrieonians, East Fife, Raith Rovers and East Kilbride.

== Club career ==
=== Blackburn Rovers ===
Connell began his career at Motherwell before joining the youth team at Blackburn Rovers during the summer of 2017 for an undisclosed fee.

=== Kilmarnock ===
After leaving Blackburn, Connell returned to Scotland and joined the youth set-up at Kilmarnock, making his debut as a second-half substitute in a 6−0 win over Queen's Park in the Scottish Cup.

On 5 October 2020, Connell joined Scottish League One side Airdrieonians on an initial short−term loan until January, which was later extended until the end of the season.

=== East Kilbride ===
On 26 January 2023, Connell joined Lowland League club East Kilbride.
