= Tomas Brindley =

Scottish footballer

Personal information
- Date of birth: 13 October 2001 (age 25)
- Place of birth: Paisley, Scotland
- Height: 5 ft 11 in (1.80 m)
- Position: Left back

Youth career
- Kilmarnock

Senior career*
Years	Team	Apps	(Gls)
2020–2022	Kilmarnock	2	(0)
2021	→ Dumbarton (loan)	12	(1)
2022	→ Forfar Athletic (loan)	11	(0)
2022–2024	Forfar Athletic	49	(0)
2024–2025	Stranraer	26	(0)
- * Club domestic league appearances and goals as of 22:30, 7 May 2025 (UTC)

Tomas Brindley (born 13 October 2001) is a Scottish professional footballer who plays as a midfielder. He has previously played for Kilmarnock, Dumbarton, Forfar Athletic and Stranraer.

== Career ==
On 22 August 2020, Brindley made his debut for Kilmarnock, as a substitute, in a 2–0 defeat in the Scottish Premiership away to Rangers. He joined Scottish League One side Dumbarton on loan in March 2021. He scored his first senior goal for the Sons on 17 May 2021 in a 3-1 away win against Edinburgh City in the League One playoff final.

On 29 January 2022, Brindley joined Scottish League Two side Forfar Athletic on loan until the end of the season. He joined Forfar on a permanent basis during the 2022 close season.

== Career statistics ==
As of 22:48, 17 May 2021 (UTC)

Appearances and goals by club, season and competition
Club	Season	League			National Cup		League Cup		Other		Total	
Club	Season	Division	Apps	Goals	Apps	Goals	Apps	Goals	Apps	Goals	Apps	Goals
Kilmarnock	2020–21	Scottish Premiership	1	0	0	0	1	0	0	0	2	0
Dumbarton (loan)	2020–21	Scottish League One	12	0	2	0	0	0	3	1	17	1
Forfar Athletic	2021–22	Scottish League Two	0	0	0	0	0	0	0	0	0	0
Career total			13	0	2	0	1	0	3	1	19	1
