= Euan Deveney =

Northern Ireland footballer

Personal information
- Full name: Euan Thomas Deveney
- Date of birth: 16 November 2002 (age 23)
- Place of birth: Glasgow, Scotland
- Height: 1.88 m (6 ft 2 in)
- Position: Left back

Team information
- Current team: Annan Athletic

Youth career
- –2018: Rangers
- 2018–2020: Kilmarnock

Senior career*
Years	Team	Apps	(Gls)
2020–2022	Kilmarnock	1	(0)
2020–2021	→ Falkirk (loan)	7	(0)
2021	→ Clyde (loan)	8	(0)
2022–2023	Airdrieonians	37	(1)
2023–2024	Alloa Athletic	19	(0)
2024–2025	Stirling Albion	8	(0)
2025–	Annan Athletic	11	(0)
2026	Caledonian Braves (Loan)	0	(0)

International career^{‡}
2018–2019	Northern Ireland U17	8	(0)
- * Club domestic league appearances and goals as of 11:38, 18 June 2021 (UTC) ‡ National team caps and goals as of 26 March 2019

Euan Deveney (born 16 November 2002) is a professional footballer who plays as a left back plays for Annan Athletic. Born in Scotland, he represented Northern Ireland internationally on youth level.

== Club career ==
Deveney played for Rangers at youth level before joining Kilmarnock in 2018. He signed his first professional contract with the club in August 2019, and made his first team debut on 13 October 2020 during a 3–0 defeat to Dunfermline Athletic in the Scottish League Cup.

He joined Falkirk on a season-long loan on 23 October 2020.

== International career ==
Deveney, who was born in Glasgow, played for Northern Ireland at under-17 level.
