= 2017 Toulon Tournament squads =

Football tournament squads

The 2017 Toulon Tournament was an international association football tournament held in Bouches-du-Rhône, France. The twelve national teams involved in the tournament were required to register a squad of 20 players; only players in these squads were eligible to take part in the tournament. Each squad was composed of Under-20 players. All ages as of start of the tournament.

Players in boldface have been capped at full international level at some point in their career.

== Group A ==
=== Angola ===
Head coach: (Germany) Igor Lazik

No.	Pos.	Player	Date of birth (age)	Club
1	GK	**Josué**	17 July 2000 (aged 16)	(Angolan Football Federation) Kabuscorp
2	MF	**Além**	6 December 1997 (aged 19)	(Angolan Football Federation) Petro de Luanda
3	DF	Rachid	20 March 1998 (aged 19)	(Angolan Football Federation) Real Sambila
4	DF	Zé	15 July 1998 (aged 18)	(Angolan Football Federation) Academia de Futebol (AFA)
5	DF	William Salomão	25 April 1997 (aged 20)	(Angolan Football Federation) Interclube
6	DF	**Nandinho**	25 May 1998 (aged 19)	(Angolan Football Federation) Interclube
7	DF	**Mona**	26 July 1997 (aged 19)	(Angolan Football Federation) 1º de Agosto
8	MF	Calebi	20 April 1999 (aged 18)	(Angolan Football Federation) Interclube
9	FW	**Chico Banza**	17 December 1998 (aged 18)	(Angolan Football Federation) Real Sambila
10	MF	**Zinedine Catraio**	17 May 1998 (aged 19)	(Angolan Football Federation) 1º de Agosto
11	FW	**Vá**	24 August 1998 (aged 18)	(Angolan Football Federation) Progresso do Sambizanga
12	GK	Augusto	1 January 1998 (aged 19)	(Angolan Football Federation) Petro de Luanda
13	MF	Quintas	19 November 1998 (aged 18)	(Angolan Football Federation) Real Sambila
14	DF	Genivaldo	10 July 1998 (aged 18)	(Angolan Football Federation) Academia de Futebol (AFA)
15	DF	**Tomé**	22 July 1998 (aged 18)	(Angolan Football Federation) Petro de Luanda
16	FW	Rui	17 June 1997 (aged 19)	(Angolan Football Federation) 1º de Agosto
17	MF	**Milson**	12 October 1999 (aged 17)	(Angolan Football Federation) Real Sambila
18	MF	Jaredi	11 November 1998 (aged 18)	(Angolan Football Federation) Academia de Futebol (AFA)
19	FW	Paulo Joaquim	25 March 1997 (aged 20)	(Angolan Football Federation) 14 de Abril do Soyo
22	GK	Beny	3 November 1999 (aged 17)	(Angolan Football Federation) Real Sambila

=== Cuba ===
Head coach: (Cuba) Raúl González Triana

No.	Pos.	Player	Date of birth (age)	Club
1	GK	Danny Echevarría	21 April 2000 (aged 17)	(Football Association of Cuba) Villa Clara
4	DF	Omar Proenza	9 December 1999 (aged 17)	(Football Association of Cuba) Camagüey
5	DF	Jansiel Blanco	11 July 1998 (aged 18)	(Football Association of Cuba) Cienfuegos
6	DF	**Dariel Morejón**	21 December 1998 (aged 18)	(Football Association of Cuba) Villa Clara
7	MF	**Raycharles Herrera**	21 January 1998 (aged 19)	(Football Association of Cuba) Cienfuegos
8	MF	**Neisser Sandó**	26 October 1998 (aged 18)	(Football Association of Cuba) Cienfuegos
9	FW	**Juan Andreu Milanés**	8 November 1999 (aged 17)	(Football Association of Cuba) Las Tunas
10	FW	**Eduardo Puga**	30 May 1998 (aged 18)	(Football Association of Cuba) Sancti Spíritus
11	FW	Adrián Osorio	14 April 1998 (aged 19)	(Football Association of Cuba) Holguín
12	GK	Antuán Obregón	20 September 2000 (aged 16)	(Football Association of Cuba) Artemisa
13	MF	Rolando Oviedo	10 January 1999 (aged 18)	(Football Association of Cuba) La Habana
14	MF	Lázaro Tuero	11 August 1997 (aged 19)	(Football Association of Cuba) Villa Clara
15	DF	**Luismel Morris**	14 December 1997 (aged 19)	(Football Association of Cuba) Camagüey
16	DF	Orlando Madrigal	14 October 1997 (aged 19)	(Football Association of Cuba) Ciego de Ávila
17	MF	Julio César Noy	31 March 1999 (aged 18)	(Football Association of Cuba) Ciego de Ávila
18	MF	Alessandro Amador	30 September 1998 (aged 18)	(Football Association of Cuba) Artemisa
19	FW	Cristian Flores	6 April 1999 (aged 18)	(Football Association of Cuba) Santiago de Cuba

=== England ===
Head coach: (England) Neil Dewsnip

England named a squad on 16 May. Subsequent to the announcement, Elliott Moore replaced Sadou Diallo of Manchester City, who withdrew injured, and Callum Slattery replaced Andre Dozzell of Ipswich Town who was removed from the squad to play for England under-19s. While it was officially considered an Under-20 side, the main England under-20s were taking part in the 2017 FIFA U-20 World Cup at the same time.

No.	Pos.	Player	Date of birth (age)	Club
1	GK	Ryan Schofield	11 December 1999 (aged 17)	(The Football Association) Huddersfield Town
2	DF	**Reece James**	8 December 1999 (aged 17)	(The Football Association) Chelsea
3	DF	Josh Grant	11 October 1998 (aged 18)	(The Football Association) Chelsea
4	DF	Josh Tymon	22 May 1999 (aged 18)	(The Football Association) Hull City
5	DF	Joe Worrall	10 January 1997 (aged 20)	(The Football Association) Nottingham Forest
6	DF	Elliott Moore	16 March 1997 (aged 20)	(The Football Association) Leicester City
7	DF	Japhet Tanganga	31 March 1999 (aged 18)	(The Football Association) Tottenham Hotspur
8	MF	**Harvey Barnes**	9 December 1997 (aged 19)	(The Football Association) Leicester City
9	MF	Demetri Mitchell	11 January 1997 (aged 20)	(The Football Association) Manchester United
10	MF	Callum Slattery	8 February 1999 (aged 18)	(The Football Association) Southampton
11	MF	**Ronaldo Vieira**	19 July 1998 (aged 18)	(The Football Association) Leeds United
12	MF	Tariq Uwakwe	19 November 1999 (aged 17)	(The Football Association) Chelsea
13	GK	Ellery Balcombe	15 October 1999 (aged 17)	(The Football Association) Brentford
14	FW	Elliot Embleton	2 April 1999 (aged 18)	(The Football Association) Sunderland
15	FW	Dan Kemp	11 January 1999 (aged 18)	(The Football Association) West Ham United
16	FW	Luke Bolton	7 October 1999 (aged 17)	(The Football Association) Manchester City
17	FW	**George Hirst**	15 February 1999 (aged 18)	(The Football Association) Sheffield Wednesday
18	MF	**David Brooks**	8 July 1997 (aged 19)	(The Football Association) Sheffield United
19	FW	Martell Taylor-Crossdale	26 December 1999 (aged 17)	(The Football Association) Chelsea
20	FW	**Iké Ugbo**	21 September 1998 (aged 18)	(The Football Association) Chelsea

=== Japan ===
Head coach: (Japan) Masanaga Kageyama

No.	Pos.	Player	Date of birth (age)	Club
1	GK	**Keisuke Osako**	28 July 1999 (aged 17)	(Japan Football Association) Sanfrecce Hiroshima Youth
2	DF	So Nakagawa	1 June 1999 (aged 17)	(Japan Football Association) Kashiwa Reysol U-18
3	DF	Kosuke Tanaka	1 February 1999 (aged 18)	(Japan Football Association) Ritsumeikan University
4	DF	**Daiki Hashioka**	17 May 1999 (aged 18)	(Japan Football Association) Urawa Reds Youth
5	DF	Danto Sugiyama	20 May 1999 (aged 18)	(Japan Football Association) Ichiritsu Funabashi High School
6	DF	**Yugo Tatsuta**	21 June 1998 (aged 18)	(Japan Football Association) Shimizu S-Pulse
7	MF	Takeaki Harigaya	15 October 1998 (aged 18)	(Japan Football Association) Júbilo Iwata
8	MF	Riku Tanaka	4 May 1999 (aged 18)	(Japan Football Association) Kashiwa Reysol U-18
9	FW	**Hiroki Abe**	28 January 1999 (aged 18)	(Japan Football Association) Kashima Antlers
10	MF	Kakeru Suminaga	6 October 1998 (aged 18)	(Japan Football Association) Meiji University
11	FW	Ren Komatsu	10 September 1998 (aged 18)	(Japan Football Association) Sanno Institute of Management
12	GK	Yuya Oki	22 August 1999 (aged 17)	(Japan Football Association) Kashima Antlers Youth
13	MF	Kaina Yoshio	28 June 1998 (aged 18)	(Japan Football Association) Yokohama F. Marinos
14	MF	Daiki Kaneko	28 August 1998 (aged 18)	(Japan Football Association) Kanagawa University
15	DF	Shogo Asada	6 July 1998 (aged 18)	(Japan Football Association) Kyoto Sanga
16	MF	**Hiroki Itō**	12 May 1999 (aged 18)	(Japan Football Association) Júbilo Iwata U-18
17	MF	Takumi Sasaki	30 March 1998 (aged 19)	(Japan Football Association) Vegalta Sendai
18	FW	Mizuki Ando	19 July 1999 (aged 17)	(Japan Football Association) Nagasaki IAS High School
19	FW	Atsushi Kurokawa	4 February 1998 (aged 19)	(Japan Football Association) Omiya Ardija
20	DF	Stevia Egbus Mikuni	31 May 1998 (aged 18)	(Japan Football Association) Juntendo University

== Group B ==
=== Bahrain ===
Head coach: (Tunisia) Samir Chammam

No.	Pos.	Player	Date of birth (age)	Club
1	GK	Anwar Ahmed Taher	19 September 1997 (aged 19)	(Bahrain Football Association) Al-Najma
2	DF	**Husain Abbas Alkhayyat**	15 October 1997 (aged 19)	(Bahrain Football Association) East Riffa
3	DF	**Ahmed Bughammar**	30 December 1997 (aged 19)	(Bahrain Football Association) Al-Hidd
4	DF	Husain Jameel Mansoor	3 October 1997 (aged 19)	(Bahrain Football Association) Al-Shabab
5	DF	**Hamad Al-Shamsan**	29 September 1997 (aged 19)	(Bahrain Football Association) Al-Budaiya
6	MF	Faisal Shawqi Bureshaid	17 June 1997 (aged 19)	(Bahrain Football Association) Al-Muharraq
7	MF	Ali Ahmed Al-Anezi	20 January 1997 (aged 20)	(Bahrain Football Association) East Riffa
8	FW	**Mohamed Marhoon**	12 February 1998 (aged 19)	(Bahrain Football Association) Al-Riffa
9	MF	Talal Al-Naar	2 November 1997 (aged 19)	(Bahrain Football Association) Al-Muharraq
10	MF	**Mohammed Al-Hardan**	6 October 1997 (aged 19)	(Bahrain Football Association) Al-Muharraq
11	FW	**Abdulaziz Khalid**	17 March 1997 (aged 20)	(Bahrain Football Association) Al-Qalali
12	DF	**Ali Hasan Yahya**	29 November 1997 (aged 19)	(Bahrain Football Association) Al-Tadhamun
13	FW	Sayed Ebrahim Alawi	25 October 1997 (aged 19)	(Bahrain Football Association) Al-Shabab
14	MF	Abdulrahman Mohamed Ahmed	16 April 1998 (aged 19)	(Bahrain Football Association) Al-Muharraq
15	DF	**Hasan Ali Alkarrani**	27 November 1997 (aged 19)	(Bahrain Football Association) Sitra
16	MF	**Sayed Hashim Isa**	3 April 1998 (aged 19)	(Bahrain Football Association) Malkiya
17	DF	Abdulaziz Aref Salman	16 October 1997 (aged 19)	(Bahrain Football Association) Busaiteen
18	MF	Mohamed Ameen Shubbar	7 March 1999 (aged 18)	(Bahrain Football Association) Sitra
19	FW	Ahmed Saleh Sanad	11 January 1998 (aged 19)	(Bahrain Football Association) Isa Town
20	GK	Yusuf Habib Mansoor	9 January 1998 (aged 19)	(Bahrain Football Association) Malkiya

=== Ivory Coast ===
Head coach: (Ivory Coast) Soualiho Haïdara

No.	Pos.	Player	Date of birth (age)	Club
1	GK	Abou Niang	9 February 1997 (aged 20)	(French Football Federation) Côte Bleue
2	MF	Kader Touré Yaya	24 April 2000 (aged 17)	(French Football Federation) Caen
3	MF	Christ Tiéhi	16 June 1998 (aged 18)	(French Football Federation) Le Havre
4	MF	Sylla Yacou Yobouet	1 November 1999 (aged 17)	(Italian Football Federation) Pro Piacenza
5	DF	Aboubacar Kouyaté	3 October 1998 (aged 18)	(French Football Federation) Monaco
6	DF	Ulrich Meleke	24 May 1999 (aged 18)	(Ivorian Football Federation) SOA
7	FW	Wilfried Gnoukouri	4 January 2000 (aged 17)	(Italian Football Federation) Inter Milan Primavera
8	DF	Jordan Kouassi	9 August 1998 (aged 18)	(French Football Federation) ASM Belfort
9	FW	Juvenal Agnero	29 December 1998 (aged 18)	(Italian Football Federation) Milan Primavera
10	MF	**Jean Thierry Lazare**	7 March 1998 (aged 19)	(Royal Belgian Football Association) Eupen
11	DF	Sékou Bamba	29 June 1998 (aged 18)	(Ivorian Football Federation) Cauceiville
12	FW	**Jean-Philippe Krasso**	17 July 1997 (aged 19)	(French Football Federation) Lorient
13	FW	Aké Arnaud Loba	1 April 1998 (aged 19)	(Ivorian Football Federation) SOA
14	MF	Koffi Dakoi	26 August 1999 (aged 17)	(Ivorian Football Federation) Ivoire Academie
15	FW	Amara Koné	26 December 1998 (aged 18)	(French Football Federation) 1er Canton Marseille
16	GK	El Hadj Moustapha Danté	18 August 1998 (aged 18)	(Ivorian Football Federation) Williamsville
17	MF	Kalou Djebi	17 July 1998 (aged 18)	(French Football Federation) Marignane Gignac
18	DF	Souleymane Diaby	8 October 1999 (aged 17)	(Ivorian Football Federation) Denguélé
19	MF	Oumar Cissé	24 November 1999 (aged 17)	(French Football Federation) Gazélec Ajaccio
20	DF	Trazié Thomas	1 July 1999 (aged 17)	(Ivorian Football Federation) JC Abidjan

=== France ===
Head coach: (France) Jean-Claude Giuntini

No.	Pos.	Player	Date of birth (age)	Club
1	GK	**Dimitry Bertaud**	6 June 1998 (aged 18)	(French Football Federation) Montpellier
2	DF	Alec Georgen	17 September 1998 (aged 18)	(French Football Federation) Paris Saint-Germain
3	DF	Romain Perraud	22 September 1997 (aged 19)	(French Football Federation) Nice
4	DF	Bradley Danger	29 January 1998 (aged 19)	(French Football Federation) Le Havre
5	DF	Ruben Droehnlé	11 July 1998 (aged 18)	(French Football Federation) Lille
6	MF	Jean Ruiz	6 April 1998 (aged 19)	(French Football Federation) Sochaux
7	MF	Vincent Marcel	9 April 1997 (aged 20)	(French Football Federation) Nice
8	MF	Nicolas Janvier	11 August 1998 (aged 18)	(French Football Federation) Rennes
9	FW	Yanis Barka	18 April 1998 (aged 19)	(French Football Federation) Nancy
10	MF	Bilal Boutobba	29 August 1998 (aged 18)	(Royal Spanish Football Federation) Sevilla Atlético
11	FW	Florian Ayé	19 January 1997 (aged 20)	(French Football Federation) Auxerre
12	MF	Jérémy Livolant	9 January 1998 (aged 19)	(French Football Federation) Guingamp
13	FW	Derick Osei	10 September 1998 (aged 18)	(French Football Federation) Toulouse
14	DF	Rémi Roldan	26 February 1998 (aged 19)	(French Football Federation) Montpellier
15	DF	Mathias Fischer	11 July 1998 (aged 18)	(French Football Federation) Nancy
16	GK	Nicolas Kocik	4 August 1998 (aged 18)	(French Football Federation) Valenciennes
17	MF	Lorenzo Callegari	27 February 1998 (aged 19)	(French Football Federation) Paris Saint-Germain
18	FW	**Jean-Philippe Mateta**	28 June 1997 (aged 19)	(French Football Federation) Lyon
19	FW	Arnaud Nordin	17 June 1998 (aged 18)	(French Football Federation) Saint-Étienne
20	MF	Abdoulaye Sissako	26 May 1998 (aged 19)	(French Football Federation) Auxerre

=== Wales ===
Head coach: (Wales) Rob Page

No.	Pos.	Player	Date of birth (age)	Club
1	GK	Luke Pilling	25 July 1997 (aged 19)	(The Football Association) Tranmere Rovers
2	DF	Cameron Coxe	18 December 1998 (aged 18)	(Football Association of Wales) Cardiff City
3	DF	Rhys Abbruzzese	28 March 1998 (aged 19)	(Football Association of Wales) Cardiff City
4	DF	**Regan Poole**	18 June 1998 (aged 18)	(The Football Association) Manchester United
5	DF	**Joe Rodon**	22 October 1997 (aged 19)	(Football Association of Wales) Swansea City
6	DF	Cian Harries	1 April 1997 (aged 20)	(The Football Association) Coventry City
7	FW	**George Thomas**	24 March 1997 (aged 20)	(The Football Association) Coventry City
8	MF	Jack Evans	25 April 1998 (aged 19)	(Football Association of Wales) Swansea City
9	FW	**Tyler Roberts**	12 January 1999 (aged 18)	(The Football Association) West Bromwich Albion
10	MF	**Nathan Broadhead**	5 April 1998 (aged 19)	(The Football Association) Everton
11	FW	**Daniel James**	10 November 1997 (aged 19)	(Football Association of Wales) Swansea City
12	GK	Lewis Thomas	20 September 1997 (aged 19)	(Football Association of Wales) Swansea City
13	MF	Keiran Evans	27 March 1999 (aged 18)	(Football Association of Wales) Swansea City
14	MF	Rhyle Ovenden	10 August 1998 (aged 18)	(The Football Association) Watford
15	DF	**Chris Mepham**	5 November 1997 (aged 19)	(The Football Association) Brentford
16	MF	Lloyd Humphries	3 October 1997 (aged 19)	(Football Association of Wales) Cardiff City
17	DF	Aaron Lewis	26 June 1998 (aged 18)	(Football Association of Wales) Swansea City
18	DF	Cole Dasilva	11 May 1999 (aged 18)	(The Football Association) Chelsea
19	MF	**Mark Harris**	29 December 1998 (aged 18)	(Football Association of Wales) Cardiff City
20	FW	**Liam Cullen**	23 April 1999 (aged 18)	(Football Association of Wales) Swansea City

== Group C ==
=== Brazil ===
Head coach: (Brazil) Carlos Amadeu

No.	Pos.	Player	Date of birth (age)	Club
1	GK	Phelipe Megiolaro	8 February 1999 (aged 18)	(Brazilian Football Confederation) Grêmio
2	DF	**Emerson Royal**	14 January 1999 (aged 18)	(Brazilian Football Confederation) Ponte Preta
3	DF	Walce	2 February 1999 (aged 18)	(Brazilian Football Confederation) São Paulo
4	DF	Gabriel Oliveira	17 January 1999 (aged 18)	(Brazilian Football Confederation) Vitória
5	MF	Gabriel Kazu	9 June 1999 (aged 17)	(Brazilian Football Confederation) Luverdense
6	DF	Michael	27 May 1999 (aged 18)	(Brazilian Football Confederation) Flamengo
7	FW	Paulo Vitor	24 June 1999 (aged 17)	(Brazilian Football Confederation) Vasco da Gama
8	MF	Vinícius Souza	17 June 1999 (aged 17)	(Brazilian Football Confederation) Flamengo
9	FW	Juninho	26 February 1999 (aged 18)	(Brazilian Football Confederation) Sport
10	MF	Fabrício Oya	23 July 1999 (aged 17)	(Brazilian Football Confederation) Corinthians
11	FW	Marquinhos Cipriano	9 February 1999 (aged 18)	(Brazilian Football Confederation) São Paulo
12	GK	**Hugo Souza**	31 January 1999 (aged 18)	(Brazilian Football Confederation) Flamengo
13	DF	Lucas Minele	15 February 1999 (aged 18)	(Brazilian Football Confederation) Corinthians
14	DF	Bruno Fuchs	1 April 1999 (aged 18)	(Brazilian Football Confederation) Internacional
15	DF	Felipe Camargo	8 January 1999 (aged 18)	(Brazilian Football Confederation) Figueirense
16	MF	Juliano Fabro	8 January 1999 (aged 18)	(Brazilian Football Confederation) Internacional
17	MF	Pablo Pardal	21 April 1999 (aged 18)	(Brazilian Football Confederation) Cruzeiro
18	MF	Igor Gomes	17 March 1999 (aged 18)	(Brazilian Football Confederation) São Paulo
19	FW	Luan Silva	26 February 1999 (aged 18)	(Brazilian Football Confederation) Vitória
20	FW	Gabriel Novaes	5 April 1999 (aged 18)	(Brazilian Football Confederation) São Paulo

=== Indonesia ===
Head coach: (Indonesia) Indra Sjafri

No.	Pos.	Player	Date of birth (age)	Club
1	GK	**Muhammad Riyandi**	3 January 2000 (aged 17)	(Football Association of Indonesia) Barito Putera
3	DF	Julyano Pratama	10 July 2000 (aged 16)	(Football Association of Indonesia) PPLP Ragunan
5	DF	**Nurhidayat**	5 April 1999 (aged 18)	(Football Association of Indonesia) PSM Makassar
6	MF	Muhammad Iqbal	27 October 2000 (aged 16)	(Football Association of Indonesia) Asprov Sumatera Barat
7	MF	Luthfi Kamal	20 January 1999 (aged 18)	(Football Association of Indonesia) Asprov DKI Jakarta
8	MF	**Witan Sulaeman**	8 October 2001 (aged 15)	(Football Association of Indonesia) PPLP Ragunan
10	FW	**Egy Maulana Vikri**	7 July 2000 (aged 16)	(Football Association of Indonesia) PPLP Ragunan
12	DF	**Rifad Marasabessy**	7 July 1999 (aged 17)	(Football Association of Indonesia) Madura United
13	DF	**Rachmat Irianto**	3 September 1999 (aged 17)	(Football Association of Indonesia) Persebaya Surabaya
14	FW	Feby Eka Putra	12 February 1999 (aged 18)	(Football Association of Indonesia) Asprov Jawa Timur
16	MF	Teuku Noer	27 May 1999 (aged 18)	(Football Association of Indonesia) Asprov Aceh
18	DF	Irsan Lestaluhu	4 August 1999 (aged 17)	(Football Association of Indonesia) PPLP Kabupaten Bogor
19	FW	**Hanis Saghara**	8 September 1999 (aged 17)	(Football Association of Indonesia) Asprov Jawa Timur
21	GK	Gianluca Pagliuca Rossy	25 July 1999 (aged 17)	(Football Association of Indonesia) PPLP Ragunan
22	DF	Dedi Tri Maulana	27 May 1999 (aged 18)	(Football Association of Indonesia) PPLP Ragunan
24	MF	Resky Fandi	6 September 1999 (aged 17)	(Football Association of Indonesia) Asprov Sulawesi Barat
27	FW	Aulia Hidayat	2 May 1999 (aged 18)	(Football Association of Indonesia) Asprov Aceh
28	DF	Renaldi Yulhan	22 February 1999 (aged 18)	(Football Association of Indonesia) SSB ASIFA
29	DF	**Firza Andika**	11 May 1999 (aged 18)	(Football Association of Indonesia) Semen Padang
34	MF	Adha Nurrokhim	3 April 1999 (aged 18)	(Football Association of Indonesia) Asprov Jawa Tengah

=== Czech Republic ===
Head coach: (Czech Republic) Jan Suchopárek

No.	Pos.	Player	Date of birth (age)	Club
1	GK	Jan Plachý	7 May 1998 (aged 19)	(Football Association of the Czech Republic) Teplice
2	DF	Pavel Tkáč	15 June 1998 (aged 18)	(Football Association of the Czech Republic) Slovácko
3	DF	**Matěj Chaluš**	2 February 1998 (aged 19)	(Football Association of the Czech Republic) Příbram
4	DF	Libor Holík	12 May 1998 (aged 19)	(Football Association of the Czech Republic) Karviná
5	DF	Daniel Mareček	30 May 1998 (aged 18)	(Football Association of the Czech Republic) Sparta Prague
6	MF	Emil Tischler	13 March 1998 (aged 19)	(Football Association of the Czech Republic) Slovácko
7	DF	František Čech	12 June 1998 (aged 18)	(Football Association of the Czech Republic) Hradec Králové
8	MF	**Michal Sadílek**	31 May 1999 (aged 17)	(Royal Dutch Football Association) PSV Eindhoven
9	MF	**Ondřej Lingr**	7 October 1998 (aged 18)	(Football Association of the Czech Republic) Karviná
10	FW	Ondřej Šašinka	21 March 1998 (aged 19)	(Slovak Football Association) Senica
11	FW	Roman Kašiar	27 January 1998 (aged 19)	(German Football Association) Stuttgarter Kickers
12	FW	Ondřej Novotný	5 February 1998 (aged 19)	(Football Association of the Czech Republic) Sparta Prague
13	DF	**Alex Král**	19 May 1998 (aged 19)	(Football Association of the Czech Republic) Teplice
14	MF	Filip Havelka	21 January 1998 (aged 19)	(Football Association of the Czech Republic) Sparta Prague
15	MF	Ondřej Chvěja	17 July 1998 (aged 18)	(Football Association of the Czech Republic) Baník Ostrava
16	GK	**Martin Jedlička**	24 January 1998 (aged 19)	(Football Association of the Czech Republic) Příbram
17	MF	Jakub Rezek	29 May 1998 (aged 19)	(Football Association of the Czech Republic) Slovácko
18	DF	Denis Granečný	7 September 1998 (aged 18)	(Football Association of the Czech Republic) Baník Ostrava
19	FW	Martin Graiciar	11 April 1999 (aged 18)	(Football Association of the Czech Republic) Viktoria Plzeň
20	MF	Michal Hlavatý	17 June 1998 (aged 18)	(Football Association of the Czech Republic) Viktoria Plzeň

=== Scotland ===
Head coach: (Scotland) Scot Gemmill

No.	Pos.	Player	Date of birth (age)	Club
1	GK	Jack Ruddy	27 December 1997 (aged 19)	(The Football Association) Wolverhampton Wanderers
2	DF	**Anthony Ralston**	16 November 1998 (aged 18)	(Scottish Football Association) Celtic
3	DF	**Greg Taylor**	5 November 1997 (aged 19)	(Scottish Football Association) Kilmarnock
4	DF	Alex Iacovitti	2 September 1997 (aged 19)	(The Football Association) Nottingham Forest
5	DF	Jamie McCart	20 June 1997 (aged 19)	(Scottish Football Association) Celtic
6	DF	Zak Jules	7 February 1997 (aged 20)	(The Football Association) Reading
7	MF	**Oliver Burke**	7 April 1997 (aged 20)	(German Football Association) RB Leipzig
8	MF	Kyle Magennis	26 August 1998 (aged 18)	(Scottish Football Association) St Mirren
9	FW	Ryan Hardie	17 March 1997 (aged 20)	(Scottish Football Association) Rangers
10	FW	Scott Wright	8 August 1997 (aged 19)	(Scottish Football Association) Aberdeen
11	FW	Adam Frizzell	21 February 1998 (aged 19)	(Scottish Football Association) Kilmarnock
12	GK	**Ross Doohan**	29 March 1998 (aged 19)	(Scottish Football Association) Celtic
13	MF	Iain Wilson	15 December 1998 (aged 18)	(Scottish Football Association) Kilmarnock
14	MF	Aidan Nesbitt	5 February 1997 (aged 20)	(Scottish Football Association) Celtic
15	MF	Joe Thomson	14 January 1997 (aged 20)	(Scottish Football Association) Celtic
16	DF	Sam Wardrop	20 October 1997 (aged 19)	(Scottish Football Association) Celtic
17	MF	Ruben Sammut	26 September 1997 (aged 19)	(The Football Association) Chelsea
18	FW	Craig Wighton	27 July 1997 (aged 19)	(Scottish Football Association) Dundee
19	MF	Jordan Holsgrove	10 September 1999 (aged 17)	(The Football Association) Reading
20	DF	**Ross McCrorie**	18 March 1998 (aged 19)	(Scottish Football Association) Rangers
