= Plachý =

Plachý (Czech/Slovak feminine: Plachá) or Plachy is a surname meaning 'shy' in Czech and Slovak. Notable people with the surname include:

- Antonín Plachý (born 1971), Czech footballer
- Jan Plachý (born 1998), Czech footballer
- Josef Plachý (table tennis) (born 1971), Czech table tennis player
- Jozef Plachý (born 1949), Slovak runner
- Mátyás Plachy (1930–1993), Hungarian boxer
- Sylvia Plachy (born 1943), American photographer
