= Tkáč =

Tkáč is a Slovak surname (meaning "weaver"), it may refer to:

- Alojz Tkáč (1934–2023), Slovak Roman Catholic archbishop
- Anton Tkáč (1951–2022), Slovak cyclist
- Ján Tkáč (born 1972), Slovak chemist
- Ľudovít Tkáč (fl. 1983), Slovak canoeist
- Pavel Tkáč (born 1998), Czech footballer
- Vladimír Tkáč (born 1998), Slovak footballer

== See also ==
- Takáč
