= Wales football team =

Wales football team may refer to:

- Wales national football team
  - Wales national under-21 football team
  - Wales national under-20 football team
  - Wales national under-19 football team
  - Wales national under-18 football team
  - Wales national under-17 football team
- Wales women's national football team
- Wales national semi-professional football team
