= Adam Frizzell =

Scottish footballer

Personal information
- Date of birth: 21 February 1998 (age 28)
- Place of birth: Greenock, Scotland
- Position: Winger

Team information
- Current team: Linfield
- Number: 23

Youth career
- –2011: Rangers
- 2011-2015: Kilmarnock

Senior career*
Years	Team	Apps	(Gls)
2015–2020	Kilmarnock	40	(3)
2018	→ Livingston (loan)	5	(0)
2018	→ Queen of the South (loan)	11	(0)
2019–2020	→ Dumbarton (loan)	9	(2)
2020–2021	Dumbarton	18	(2)
2021–2025	Airdrieonians	104	(10)
2025–2026	Derry City	6	(0)
2026–	Linfield	11	(2)

International career
2017	Scotland U20	5	(0)
Medal record
Scotland
Toulon Tournament
Bronze medal – third place	2017 Toulon	U–20 Competition
- * Club domestic league appearances and goals as of 29 April 2026

Adam Frizzell (born 21 February 1998) is a Scottish professional footballer who plays as a winger for NIFL Premiership club Linfield.

== Club career ==
On 17 October 2015, Frizzell debuted for Killie in a 2–0 win versus Inverness Caledonian Thistle.

On 30 March 2018, Frizzell moved on loan to Livingston until the end of May 2018.

On 31 August 2018, Frizzell moved on loan to Scottish Championship club Queen of the South in Dumfries until early January 2019. On 6 January 2018, Frizzell returned to Killie on completion of his loan spell having played in 13 matches for the Doonhamers.

He joined Scottish League One side Dumbarton on loan in October 2019. He scored twice on his debut in a 3–1 victory against Forfar Athletic.

Frizzell left Kilmarnock at the end of the 2019–20 season, with his contract having expired and signed permanently for Dumbarton on a short-term deal until January 2021 in October 2020 scoring the winner on his debut against Clyde. In January 2021, his contract was extended to the end of the season. He left the Sons in June 2021 to join League One rivals Airdrieonians. Frizzell played a key role in helping Airdrieonians gain promotion back to the Scottish Championship via the play-offs at the end of season 2022-23. Captained Airdrieonians to a 2-1 victory over The New Saints in the Challenge Cup Final at the Falkirk Stadium on 24 March 2024

On 25 June 2025, it was announced that Frizzell had signed for League of Ireland Premier Division club Derry City on an 18 month contract set to commence from 1 July. He struggled for game time, making just 8 appearances in all competitions before it was announced on 19 January 2026 that he had been allowed leave the club for free.

On 19 January 2026, he signed for NIFL Premiership club Linfield on a free transfer on an 18 month contract.

== International career ==
Selected for the Scotland under-20 squad in the 2017 Toulon Tournament. The team went to claim the bronze medal. It was the nations first ever medal at the competition.

== Career statistics ==
As of 22:48, 20 May 2021 (UTC)

Appearances and goals by club, season and competition
Club	Season	League			Scottish Cup		League Cup		Other		Total	
Club	Season	Division	Apps	Goals	Apps	Goals	Apps	Goals	Apps	Goals	Apps	Goals
Kilmarnock	2015–16	Scottish Premiership	10	0	2	0	0	0	–		12	0
Kilmarnock	2016–17	Scottish Premiership	15	1	0	0	1	0	1 (Note: Appearance for Kilmarnock under-20s in the Scottish Challenge Cup in which age-restricted sides from the Scottish Premiership clubs compete against senior clubs)	0	17	1
Kilmarnock	2017–18	Scottish Premiership	15	2	1	0	5	0	—		21	2
Kilmarnock	2018–19	Scottish Premiership	0	0	0	0	0	0	–		0	0
Kilmarnock	2019–20	Scottish Premiership	0	0	0	0	0	0	0	0	0	0
Kilmarnock	Total		40	3	3	0	6	0	1	0	50	3
Livingston (loan)	2017–18	Scottish Championship	5	0	0	0	0	0	0	0	5	0
Queen of the South (loan)	2018–19	Scottish Championship	11	0	0	0	0	0	2 (Note: Appearances in the Scottish Challenge Cup)	0	13	0
Dumbarton (loan)	2019–20	Scottish League One	9	2	1	1	0	0	0	0	10	3
Dumbarton	2020–21	Scottish League One	18	2	2	0	2	0	3	0	25	2
Dumbarton	Total		27	4	3	1	2	0	3	0	35	5
Airdrieonians	2021–22	Scottish League One	0	0	0	0	0	0	0	0	0	0
Career total			83	7	6	1	8	0	6	0	103	8
