= 2018–19 Wigan Athletic F.C. season =

Wigan Athletic
2018–19 season
- Owner: Dave Whelan(until 7 November 2018); International Entertainment Corporation (from 7 November 2018)
- Chairman: David Sharpe (until 7 November 2018); Darren Royle (from 7 November 2018)
- Manager: Paul Cook
- Stadium: DW Stadium
- Championship: 18th
- FA Cup: Third round
- EFL Cup: First round
- Top goalscorer: League: Nick Powell, Joe Garner (8); All: Nick Powell, Joe Garner (8)
- Highest home attendance: 15,655 v. Norwich City (14 April 2019)
- Lowest home attendance: 8,848 v. Hull City (18 September 2018)
- Average home league attendance: 11,661
- Biggest win: 3–0 at Stoke City (22 August 2018); 3–0 v. Aston Villa (12 January 2019); 5–2 v. Bolton Wanderers (16 March 2019)
- Biggest defeat: 0–4 v. Preston North End (6 October 2018)
Home colours	Away colours

The 2018–19 season was Wigan Athletic's 87th year in existence and their first back in the Championship, after gaining promotion the previous season. Along with competing in the league, the club also participated in the FA Cup and EFL Cup. The season covered the period from 1 July 2018 to 30 June 2019.

== Change in ownership ==
During the season International Entertainment Corporation (IEC) completed their acquisition of the club, stadium and training grounds in a £22m deal. Chairman David Sharpe stepped down following the completion of the takeover along with other board members and was replaced by Darren Royle, his father Joe Royle and Thomas Chan.

== Transfers ==
=== Transfers in ===
Date from	Position	Nationality	Name	From	Fee	Ref.
1 July 2018	CM	(Portugal)	Leonardo Da Silva Lopes	Peterborough United	Undisclosed	
1 July 2018	GK	(England)	Bobby Jones	Middlesbrough	Undisclosed	
1 July 2018	RW	(Scotland)	Kal Naismith	Portsmouth	Free transfer	
20 July 2018	RW	(England)	Callum McManaman	Sunderland	Undisclosed	
3 August 2018	LB	(England)	Ryan Galvin	Croydon	Undisclosed	
3 August 2018	CM	(Republic of Ireland)	Darron Gibson	Sunderland	Free transfer	
3 August 2018	CB	(Ivory Coast)	Cédric Kipré	Motherwell	Undisclosed	
3 August 2018	CF	(England)	Joe Piggott	Warrington Town	Free transfer	
9 August 2018	CF	(England)	Joe Garner	Ipswich Town	Undisclosed	
9 August 2018	AM	(England)	Josh Windass	Rangers	£2,000,000	
18 September 2018	DM	(England)	Alex Perry	Bolton Wanderers	Free transfer	
18 September 2018	CB	(England)	Denzel Williams	Blackpool	Free transfer	
1 January 2019	CM	(Wales)	Lee Evans	Sheffield United	Undisclosed	
4 January 2019	LW	(England)	Ollie Crankshaw	Curzon Ashton	Undisclosed	
10 January 2019	LW	(Republic of Ireland)	Anthony Pilkington	Cardiff City	Free transfer	
29 January 2019	LB	(Scotland)	Danny Fox	Nottingham Forest	Undisclosed	
1 February 2019	CB	(Sweden)	Jonas Olsson	Djurgården	Free transfer	

=== Loans in ===
Start date	Position	Nationality	Name	From	End date	Ref.
1 July 2018	RB	(England)	Reece James	Chelsea	31 May 2019	
1 July 2018	GK	(England)	Christian Walton	Brighton & Hove Albion	31 May 2019	
3 August 2018	LB	(United States)	Antonee Robinson	Everton	31 May 2019	
9 August 2018	CB	(England)	Dan Burn	Brighton & Hove Albion	1 January 2019	
9 August 2018	DM	(England)	Callum Connolly	Everton	31 January 2019	
10 August 2018	CM	(Wales)	Lee Evans	Sheffield United	1 January 2019	
30 January 2019	CF	(England)	Leon Clarke	Sheffield United	31 May 2019	
31 January 2019	CM	(Democratic Republic of the Congo)	Beni Baningime	Everton	31 May 2019	

=== Transfers out ===
Date from	Position	Nationality	Name	To	Fee	Ref.
1 July 2018	RB	(England)	Luke Burke	AFC Fylde	Released	
1 July 2018	CM	(England)	Jamie Cotter	Free agent	Released	
1 July 2018	CB	(Montserrat)	Donervon Daniels	Blackpool	Released	
1 July 2018	CM	(England)	Joe Downey	Free agent	Released	
1 July 2018	CB	(England)	Tom Hilton	Free agent	Released	
1 July 2018	CF	(Republic of Ireland)	Noel Hunt	Waterford	Free transfer	
1 July 2018	LB	(England)	Reece James	Sunderland	Released	
1 July 2018	LB	(England)	Andy Kellett	Notts County	Released	
1 July 2018	CF	(Zambia)	Mwiya Malumo	Gottne IF	Released	
1 July 2018	CB	(Wales)	Craig Morgan	Fleetwood Town	Free transfer	
1 July 2018	DM	(England)	David Perkins	Rochdale	Free transfer	
1 July 2018	CB	(England)	Anthony Plant	Free agent	Released	
1 July 2018	GK	(England)	Theo Roberts	Chester	Released	
1 July 2018	CB	(England)	Sam Stubbs	Middlesbrough	Released	
16 July 2018	CB	(England)	Terell Thomas	AFC Wimbledon	Undisclosed	
23 July 2018	AM	(England)	Josh Laurent	Shrewsbury Town	Undisclosed	
9 August 2018	CB	(England)	Dan Burn	Brighton & Hove Albion	£3,000,000	
9 August 2018	LW	(England)	Ryan Colclough	Scunthorpe United	Undisclosed	
2 January 2019	CM	(England)	Max Power	Sunderland	Undisclosed	
25 January 2019	AM	(England)	Jordan Flores	Dundalk	Undisclosed	
30 January 2019	CB	(Northern Ireland)	Alex Bruce	Kilmarnock	Free transfer	
1 February 2019	CF	(Northern Ireland)	Will Grigg	Sunderland	Undisclosed	

=== Loans out ===
Start date	Position	Nationality	Name	To	End date	Ref.
3 August 2018	MF	(England)	Luke Burgess	Barrow	25 March 2019	
3 August 2018	GK	(England)	Jordan Perrin	Stockport Town	3 September 2018	
9 August 2018	CM	(England)	Jordan Flores	Östersund	31 December 2018	
10 August 2018	CM	(England)	Max Power	Sunderland	1 January 2019	
14 August 2018	CF	(England)	Callum Lang	Oldham Athletic	31 May 2019	
30 August 2018	CF	(England)	Devante Cole	Burton Albion	16 January 2019	
31 August 2018	CF	(England)	Joe Piggott	Morecambe	1 January 2019	
31 August 2018	LW	(Scotland)	Jamie Walker	Peterborough United	2 January 2019	
2 October 2018	GK	(England)	Jordan Perrin	F.C. United of Manchester	30 October 2018	
4 January 2019	LW	(England)	Ollie Crankshaw	Curzon Ashton	31 May 2019	
29 January 2019	CF	(England)	Joe Piggott	Altrincham	31 May 2019	
31 January 2019	CM	(Portugal)	Leonardo Lopes	Gillingham	31 May 2019	
31 January 2019	CF	(England)	James Vaughan	Portsmouth	31 May 2019	
23 February 2019	GK	(England)	Jordan Perrin	Runcorn Linnets	31 May 2019	
15 March 2019	RB	(United States)	Tylor Golden	Droylsden	31 May 2019	

=== Pre-season friendlies ===
Wigan Athletic announced they would face Tranmere Rovers in a pre-season friendly. The club held a training camp at La Cala Resort in Spain.

14 July 2018 Friendly	Tranmere Rovers	1–2	Wigan Athletic	Birkenhead
15:00 BST	Norwood 88'	Report	Grigg 2' (pen.); Walker 69'	Stadium: Prenton Park

25 July 2018 Friendly	Chesterfield	1–1	Wigan Athletic	Chesterfield
19:00 BST	Binnom-Wiliams 67'	Report	Grigg 38'	Stadium: Proact Stadium; Attendance: 2,777

29 July 2018 Friendly	Rangers	3–0	Wigan Athletic	River Clyde, Scotland
15:00 BST	Morelos 52'; Katić 57'; Bruce 62' (o.g.)	Report		Stadium: Ibrox Stadium; Attendance: 28,779; Referee: Bobby Madden (Scotland)

== Competitions ==
=== Overall record ===
Competition	First match	Last match	Starting round	Final position	Record							
Competition	First match	Last match	Starting round	Final position	Pld	W	D	L	GF	GA	GD	Win %
Championship	4 August 2018	5 May 2019	Matchday 1	18th	46	13	13	20	51	64	−13	28.26
FA Cup	5 January 2019	5 January 2019	Third round	Third round	1	0	0	1	0	1	−1	0.00
EFL Cup	13 August 2018	13 August 2018	First round	First round	1	0	0	1	1	3	−2	0.00
Total					48	13	13	22	52	68	−16	27.08

Last updated: 5 May 2019

=== Championship ===
==== League table ====
Pos	Team	Pld	W	D	L	GF	GA	GD	Pts
15	Blackburn Rovers	46	16	12	18	64	69	−5	60
16	Stoke City	46	11	22	13	45	52	−7	55
17	Birmingham City	46	14	19	13	64	58	+6	52 (Note: Birmingham City were deducted 9 points for failure to comply with the EFL profitability and sustainability rules.)
18	Wigan Athletic	46	13	13	20	51	64	−13	52
19	Queens Park Rangers	46	14	9	23	53	71	−18	51
20	Reading	46	10	17	19	49	66	−17	47
21	Millwall	46	10	14	22	48	64	−16	44

Source: Sky Sports Archived 25 September 2019 at the Wayback Machine
Rules for classification: 1) Points; 2) Goal difference; 3) Number of goals scored; 4) Head-to-head results

==== Results summary ====
Overall								Home						Away					
Pld	W	D	L	GF	GA	GD	Pts	W	D	L	GF	GA	GD	W	D	L	GF	GA	GD
46	13	13	20	51	64	−13	52	11	8	4	29	20	+9	2	5	16	22	44	−22

Last updated: 4 May 2019.
Source: BBC

==== Results by matchday ====
Matchday	1	2	3	4	5	6	7	8	9	10	11	12	13	14	15	16	17	18	19	20	21	22	23	24	25	26	27	28	29	30	31	32	33	34	35	36	37	38	39	40	41	42	43	44	45	46
Ground	H	A	H	A	A	H	A	H	H	A	H	A	H	A	A	H	A	H	H	A	H	A	H	A	A	H	H	A	A	H	A	H	H	H	A	A	A	H	H	A	A	H	A	H	A	H
Result	W	L	D	W	L	W	L	W	W	L	D	L	W	L	L	L	L	D	W	D	L	L	L	L	D	L	W	L	L	W	D	D	D	D	L	L	L	W	D	D	L	D	W	W	D	W
Position	2	9	12	8	12	9	10	7	3	8	7	11	8	10	14	16	16	17	15	15	16	16	19	19	19	20	19	20	20	19	19	19	20	19	19	20	20	19	20	19	21	21	20	18	18	18
Points	3	3	4	7	7	10	10	13	16	16	17	17	20	20	20	20	20	21	24	25	25	25	25	25	26	26	29	29	29	32	33	34	35	36	36	36	36	39	40	41	41	42	45	48	49	52

Updated to match(es) played on 4 May 2019. Source: Statto.com
A = Away; H = Home; W = Win; D = Draw; L = Loss

==== Matches ====
On 21 June 2018, the Championship fixtures for the forthcoming season were announced.

4 August 2018 1	Wigan Athletic	3–2	Sheffield Wednesday	Wigan
15:00 BST	Jacobs 11', 26'; Powell 60'	Report	Nuhiu 20' (red card) 90'; Forestieri 67'	Stadium: DW Stadium; Attendance: 14,207; Referee: Tim Robinson

11 August 2018 2	Aston Villa	3–2	Wigan Athletic	Aston
15:00 BST	Chester 13'; Dunkley 63' (o.g.); Bjarnason 90+4'	Report	Powell 41'; Connolly 55'	Stadium: Villa Park; Attendance: 34,331; Referee: Jeremy Simpson

18 August 2018 3	Wigan Athletic	2–2	Nottingham Forest	Wigan
15:00 BST	Powell 2'; Grigg 30' (pen.)	Report	Cash 10'; Soudani 90+1'	Stadium: DW Stadium; Attendance: 11,543; Referee: Geoff Eltringham

22 August 2018 4	Stoke City	0–3	Wigan Athletic	Stoke-on-Trent
20:00 BST	McClean (yellow card) 45+1'; Allen (yellow card) 56'; Williams (yellow card) 66' (red card) 78'; Crouch (yellow card) 71'	Report	Grigg 27', 57'; Massey 32'; Powell (yellow card) 66'; James (yellow card) 73'	Stadium: Britannia Stadium; Attendance: 23,158; Referee: John Brooks

25 August 2018 5	Queens Park Rangers	1–0	Wigan Athletic	Shepherd's Bush
15:00 BST	Hemed 35'	Report		Stadium: Loftus Road; Attendance: 11,564; Referee: Steve Martin

1 September 2018 6	Wigan Athletic	1–0	Rotherham United	Wigan
15:00 BST	Vaughan 73'	Report		Stadium: DW Stadium; Attendance: 9,584; Referee: Scott Duncan

15 September 2018 7	Brentford	2–0	Wigan Athletic	London
15:00 BST	Maupay 24', 63'; Watkins (yellow card) 50'; Dalsgaard (yellow card) 59'	Report	Windass (yellow card) 34'; Powell (yellow card) 40'; Morsy (red card) 58'; Dunkley (yellow card) 89'	Stadium: Griffin Park; Attendance: 9,951; Referee: Darren England

18 September 2018 8	Wigan Athletic	2–1	Hull City	Wigan
19:45 BST	Morsy 21'; Windass 38'	Report	Bowen 43'	Stadium: DW Stadium; Attendance: 8,848; Referee: David Webb

21 September 2018 9	Wigan Athletic	1–0	Bristol City	Wigan
19:45 BST	Powell 52'	Report		Stadium: DW Stadium; Attendance: 10,192; Referee: Oliver Langford

29 September 2018 10	Norwich City	1–0	Wigan Athletic	Norwich
15:00 BST	Vrančić 86' (pen.)	Report		Stadium: Carrow Road; Attendance: 25,034; Referee: Gavin Ward

2 October 2018 11	Wigan Athletic	0–0	Swansea City	Wigan
19:45 BST		Report		Stadium: DW Stadium; Attendance: 8,964; Referee: John Brooks

6 October 2018 12	Preston North End	4–0	Wigan Athletic	Preston
15:00 BST	Barkhuizen 17'; Robinson 51'; Gallagher 85' (pen.); Burn 90+6' (o.g.)	Report	Gibson (red card) 56'	Stadium: Deepdale; Attendance: 15,280; Referee: Lee Probert

20 October 2018 13	Wigan Athletic	1–0	West Bromwich Albion	Wigan
15:00 BST	Morsy (yellow card) 18'; James (yellow card) 19'; Dunkley (yellow card) 59'; Windass 74'	Report	Dawson (yellow card) 24'; Rodriguez (yellow card) 28'; Livermore (yellow card) 34' (yellow-red card) 84'; Barnes (yellow card) 48'; Brunt (yellow card) 58'	Stadium: DW Stadium; Attendance: 12,739; Referee: Jeremy Simpson

23 October 2018 14	Millwall	2–1	Wigan Athletic	Bermondsey
15:00 BST	Williams 60' (pen.); Morison 82'	Report	Wallace 45+2' (o.g.)	Stadium: The Den; Attendance: 11,190; Referee: James Linington

27 October 2018 15	Sheffield United	4–2	Wigan Athletic	Sheffield
15:00 BST	Dunkley 23' (o.g.); Sharp 45', 53', 63'	Report	Naismith 39'; Garner 69'	Stadium: Bramall Lane; Attendance: 24,429; Referee: Tony Harrington

4 November 2018 16	Wigan Athletic	1–2	Leeds United	Wigan
13:30 GMT	James 6'	Report	Hernández 9'; Roofe 46'	Stadium: DW Stadium; Attendance: 14,799; Referee: Andy Davies

10 November 2018 17	Middlesbrough	2–0	Wigan Athletic	Middlesbrough
15:00 GMT	Hugill 38' (pen.), 44'	Report		Stadium: Riverside Stadium; Attendance: 22,207; Referee: Darren England

24 November 2018 18	Wigan Athletic	0–0	Reading	Wigan
15:00 GMT		Report		Stadium: DW Stadium; Attendance: 9,211; Referee: Oliver Langford

28 November 2018 19	Wigan Athletic	3–1	Blackburn Rovers	Wigan
19:45 GMT	Roberts 37'; Vaughan 54' (pen.); McManaman 86'	Report	Burn 83' (o.g.)	Stadium: DW Stadium; Attendance: 10,777; Referee: Keith Stroud

1 December 2018 20	Bolton Wanderers	1–1	Wigan Athletic	Bolton
15:00 GMT	J Williams (yellow card) 2'; Noone (yellow card) 3'; Buckley 7'; Olkowski (yellow card) 74'	Report	Grigg 25' (pen.); Roberts (yellow card) 45'; Kipré (yellow card) 67'	Stadium: University of Bolton Stadium; Attendance: 15,237; Referee: Simon Hooper

8 December 2018 21	Wigan Athletic	0–1	Derby County	Wigan
15:00 GMT	Naismith (red card) 15'; Morsy (yellow card) 32'	Report	Marriott 21'; Wilson (yellow card) 32'; Bryson (yellow card) 76'	Stadium: DW Stadium; Attendance: 10,768; Referee: Gavin Ward

15 December 2018 22	Ipswich Town	1–0	Wigan Athletic	Ipswich
15:00 GMT	Chalobah (yellow card) 49'; Sears 67'; Chambers (yellow card) 73'; Jordan Roberts (yellow card) 84'	Report	Connolly (yellow card) 50'; Burn (yellow card) 90+3'	Stadium: Portman Road; Attendance: 14,640; Referee: Scott Duncan

22 December 2018 23	Wigan Athletic	0–3	Birmingham City	Wigan
15:00 GMT	Burn (yellow card) 90+1'	Report	Adams 26'; Morrison 45+1'; Maghoma 61', (yellow card) 64'; C. Gardner (yellow card) 76'	Stadium: DW Stadium; Attendance: 13,744; Referee: Ross Joyce

26 December 2018 24	West Bromwich Albion	2–0	Wigan Athletic	West Bromwich
15:00 GMT	Rodriguez 8', 69'; Gibbs (yellow card) 57'; Livermore (yellow card) 64'	Report	Connolly (yellow card) 17'; Garner (yellow card) 28'	Stadium: The Hawthorns; Attendance: 25,555; Referee: Robert Jones

29 December 2018 25	Swansea City	2–2	Wigan Athletic	Swansea
15:00 GMT	Grimes (yellow card) 40'; Naughton (yellow card) 52'; Burn 59' (o.g.) van der Hoorn 81' (yellow card) 90+4'	Report	Garner 10' (pen.), 34'; James (yellow card) 42'; Massey (yellow card) 66'; Naismith (yellow card) 88'; Morsy (yellow card) 90+4'	Stadium: Liberty Stadium; Attendance: 18,591; Referee: James Linington

1 January 2019 26	Wigan Athletic	0–3	Sheffield United	Wigan
15:00 GMT	Massey (yellow card) 35'; McManaman (yellow card) 62'	Report	McGoldrick 40'; Duffy 48'; Stevens (yellow card) 52'; Sharp 54'; Fleck (yellow card) 83'	Stadium: DW Stadium; Attendance: 13,054; Referee: Andrew Madley

12 January 2019 27	Wigan Athletic	3–0	Aston Villa	Wigan
15:00 GMT	Morsy (yellow card) 13'; Garner (yellow card) 38'; Roberts 41'; Windass (yellow card) 66'; Jacobs 79'; Garner 83' (pen.)	Report	Bjarnason (yellow card) 54'; Taylor (yellow card) 64'	Stadium: DW Stadium; Attendance: 13,882; Referee: Tony Harrington

19 January 2019 28	Sheffield Wednesday	1–0	Wigan Athletic	Sheffield
15:00 GMT	Fletcher 62'	Report	Evans (yellow card) 45'; Kipré (yellow card) 73'	Stadium: Hillsborough Stadium; Attendance: 22,323; Referee: Peter Bankes

26 January 2019 29	Nottingham Forest	3–1	Wigan Athletic	Nottingham
15:00 GMT	Lolley 19'; Watson (yellow card) 27'; Cash (yellow card) 30', (goal) 48'; Benalouane (yellow card) 41'; Guedioura 80'; Colback (yellow card) 90+1'	Report	Windass 33'; Morsy (yellow card) 58'; Byrne (yellow card) 70'	Stadium: City Ground; Attendance: 28,848; Referee: Alan Davies

2 February 2019 30	Wigan Athletic	2–1	Queens Park Rangers	Wigan
15:00 GMT	Windass 8'; Evans (yellow card) 21'; Clarke 55'; Kipré (yellow card) 83'; Jacobs (yellow card) 90+1'	Report	Luongo (yellow card) 13'; Osayi-Samuel 75'	Stadium: DW Stadium; Attendance: 9,799; Referee: Scott Duncan

9 February 2019 31	Rotherham United	1–1	Wigan Athletic	Rotherham
15:00 GMT	Robertson 28'; Forde (yellow card) 88'	Report	Windass 32' (yellow card) 67'; Kipré (yellow card) 54'; Pilkington (yellow card) 80'	Stadium: New York Stadium; Attendance: 9,611; Referee: Oliver Langford

13 February 2019 32	Wigan Athletic	0–0	Stoke City	Wigan
19:45 GMT	Morsy (yellow card) 82'	Report	Allen (yellow card) 28'; Bauer (yellow card) 55'; Woods (yellow card) 61'	Stadium: DW Stadium; Attendance: 9,914; Referee: Keith Stroud

23 February 2019 33	Wigan Athletic	1–1	Ipswich Town	Wigan
15:00 GMT	Naismith (yellow card) 12'; Morsy (yellow card) 67'; Garner 90+1'	Report	Knudsen (red card) 25'; Keane 32' (pen.); Pennington (yellow card) 56'; Kenlock (yellow card) 73'	Stadium: DW Stadium; Attendance: 10,835; Referee: Lee Probert

2 March 2019 34	Wigan Athletic	0–0	Middlesbrough	Wigan
15:00 GMT	Dunkley (yellow card) 33'	Report	Ayala (yellow card) 21'; Howson (yellow card) 79'	Stadium: DW Stadium; Attendance: 12,726; Referee: Stephen Martin

5 March 2019 35	Derby County	2–1	Wigan Athletic	Derby
19:45 GMT	Johnson (yellow card) 41'; Bennett (yellow card) 59' (goal) 62'; Wilson (yellow card) 63'; Tomori (yellow card) 71'; Malone 78'	Report	Massey 25'; Morsy (yellow card) 37'	Stadium: Pride Park Stadium; Referee: Tony Harrington

9 March 2019 36	Reading	3–2	Wigan Athletic	Reading
15:00 GMT	Miazga (yellow card) 42'; Swift 45+3'; Moore (yellow card) 50'; Barrow 89'; Méïté 90+7' (yellow card) 90+8'	Report	Powell 20'; Garner (yellow card) 42' (goal) 64'; Robinson (yellow card) 57'; Jacobs (yellow card) 70'	Stadium: Madejski Stadium; Attendance: 15,401; Referee: Andy Davies

12 March 2019 37	Blackburn Rovers	3–0	Wigan Athletic	Blackburn
19:45 GMT	Graham 39' (pen.), 54'; Conway (yellow card) 45'; Williams (yellow card) 80'; Dack 86'; Rothwell (yellow card) 89'	Report	Olsson (yellow card) 42'; Dunkley (yellow card) 42'; Garner (yellow card) 78'; James (yellow card) 85'	Stadium: Ewood Park; Referee: Chris Kavanagh

16 March 2019 38	Wigan Athletic	5–2	Bolton Wanderers	Wigan
15:00 GMT	Garner 4'; Massey 51'; Powell 55'; Jacobs 69'; Clarke 81'	Report	Lowe (yellow card) 3'; O'Neil 62'; Ameobi 80'	Stadium: DW Stadium; Attendance: 13,664; Referee: Robert Jones

30 March 2019 39	Wigan Athletic	0–0	Brentford	Wigan
15:00 GMT	Robinson (yellow card) 51'	Report	Barbet (yellow card) 45'; Sørensen (yellow card) 90+5'	Stadium: DW Stadium; Attendance: 9,953; Referee: Andy Woolmer

6 April 2019 40	Bristol City	2–2	Wigan Athletic	Bristol
15:00 BST	Webster (yellow card) 32'; Taylor 65'; Palmer 68'	Report	James 37'; Fox (yellow card) 40'; Byrne 90+3'	Stadium: Ashton Gate Stadium; Attendance: 20,931; Referee: Keith Stroud

10 April 2019 41	Hull City	2–1	Wigan Athletic	Kingston upon Hull
19:45 BST	Kane (yellow card) 16'; Campbell 51' (yellow card) 90+4' de Wijs 89'	Report	Powell 41'; Walton (yellow card) 68'	Stadium: KCOM Stadium; Attendance: 10,827; Referee: David Webb

14 April 2019 42	Wigan Athletic	1–1	Norwich City	Wigan
12:00 BST	Massey (yellow card) 32'; James 45' (pen.) (yellow card) 82'	Report	Trybull (yellow card) 44'; Pukki 81'	Stadium: DW Stadium; Attendance: 15,655; Referee: James Linington

19 April 2019 43	Leeds United	1–2	Wigan Athletic	Leeds
15:00 BST	Hernández (penalty missed) 16'; Bamford 17'; Klich (yellow card) 45+1'; Ayling (yellow card) 58'; Berardi (yellow card) 71'	Report	Kipré (red card) 14'; Massey 44', 62'; Evans (yellow card) 69'; Walton (yellow card) 90+2'; Powell (yellow card) 90+6'	Stadium: Elland Road; Attendance: 34,758; Referee: Scott Duncan

22 April 2019 44	Wigan Athletic	2–0	Preston North End	Wigan
15:00 BST	Clarke 11'; Morsy (yellow card) 44'; Evans 68'	Report	Nmecha (yellow card) 13'; Ledson (red card) 34'; Maguire (yellow card) 76'	Stadium: DW Stadium; Attendance: 12,496; Referee: Andrew Madley

27 April 2019 45	Birmingham City	1–1	Wigan Athletic	Birmingham
15:00 BST	Jutkiewicz 2'; Roberts (yellow card) 71'	Report	Dunkley (yellow card) 31'; Powell 45+3'	Stadium: St Andrew's; Attendance: 23,645; Referee: Stephen Martin

5 May 2019 46	Wigan Athletic	1–0	Millwall	Wigan
12:30 BST	Garner 15'	Report		Stadium: DW Stadium; Attendance: 10,859; Referee: Andy Woolmer

=== FA Cup ===
The third round draw was made live on BBC by Ruud Gullit and Paul Ince from Stamford Bridge on 3 December 2018.

5 January 2019 Third round	West Bromwich Albion	1–0	Wigan Athletic	West Bromwich
12:30 GMT	Sako 31'; Brunt (yellow card) 79'; Field (yellow card) 90+5'	Report	Connolly (yellow card) 29'; Byrne (yellow card) 58'	Stadium: The Hawthorns; Attendance: 15,465; Referee: Keith Stroud

=== EFL Cup ===
On 15 June 2018, the draw for the first round was made in Vietnam.

13 August 2018 First round	Rotherham United	3–1	Wigan Athletic	Rotherham
19:45 BST	Proctor 37', 64'; Ajayi 42'	Report	Bruce (yellow card) 25'; Vaughan 74'	Stadium: New York Stadium; Attendance: 3,017; Referee: Peter Bankes

== Statistics ==
As of 5 May 2019

No.	Pos	Nat	Player	Total		Championship		FA Cup		League Cup	
No.	Pos	Nat	Player	Apps	Goals	Apps	Goals	Apps	Goals	Apps	Goals
1	GK	(England) ENG	Christian Walton	32	0	32+0	0	0+0	0	0+0	0
2	DF	(England) ENG	Nathan Byrne	29	1	24+4	1	1+0	0	0+0	0
3	DF	(United States) USA	Antonee Robinson	24	0	24+0	0	0+0	0	0+0	0
4	MF	(Republic of Ireland) IRL	Darron Gibson	18	0	11+7	0	0+0	0	0+0	0
5	MF	(Egypt) EGY	Sam Morsy	37	1	37+0	1	0+0	0	0+0	0
6	DF	(England) ENG	Danny Fox	8	0	8+0	0	0+0	0	0+0	0
7	MF	(Scotland) SCO	Jamie Walker	1	0	0+0	0	0+0	0	1+0	0
8	FW	(England) ENG	James Vaughan	19	4	6+12	3	0+0	0	1+0	1
10	MF	(England) ENG	Josh Windass	39	4	30+8	4	1+0	0	0+0	0
11	FW	(England) ENG	Gavin Massey	17	5	13+4	5	0+0	0	0+0	0
12	DF	(England) ENG	Reece James	44	3	42+1	3	0+1	0	0+0	0
13	MF	(Republic of Ireland) IRL	Anthony Pilkington	10	0	7+3	0	0+0	0	0+0	0
14	MF	(Democratic Republic of the Congo) COD	Beni Baningime	1	0	1+0	0	0+0	0	0+0	0
15	FW	(England) ENG	Callum McManaman	24	1	1+21	1	1+0	0	1+0	0
16	MF	(Wales) WAL	Shaun MacDonald	2	0	0+0	0	0+1	0	1+0	0
17	MF	(England) ENG	Michael Jacobs	22	4	19+3	4	0+0	0	0+0	0
18	MF	(England) ENG	Gary Roberts	15	2	10+3	2	0+1	0	1+0	0
20	MF	(Scotland) SCO	Kal Naismith	30	1	20+8	1	1+0	0	1+0	0
21	DF	(Ivory Coast) CIV	Cédric Kipré	40	0	37+1	0	1+0	0	1+0	0
22	DF	(England) ENG	Chey Dunkley	37	0	35+1	0	1+0	0	0+0	0
23	GK	(England) ENG	Jamie Jones	14	0	12+0	0	1+0	0	1+0	0
25	MF	(England) ENG	Nick Powell	29	8	24+5	8	0+0	0	0+0	0
28	FW	(England) ENG	Leon Clarke	13	3	7+6	3	0+0	0	0+0	0
29	FW	(England) ENG	Charlie Jolley	1	0	0+1	0	0+0	0	0+0	0
30	DF	(Sweden) SWE	Jonas Olsson	5	0	4+1	0	0+0	0	0+0	0
36	MF	(Wales) WAL	Lee Evans	33	0	29+3	0	1+0	0	0+0	0
38	FW	(England) ENG	Joe Gelhardt	2	0	0+1	0	0+0	0	0+1	0
39	MF	(England) ENG	Jensen Weir	2	0	0+1	0	0+0	0	0+1	0
41	FW	(England) ENG	Joe Garner	32	8	17+15	8	0+0	0	0+0	0
44	FW	(England) ENG	Devante Cole	1	0	0+0	0	0+0	0	0+1	0
Player(s) out on loan:
19	MF	(Portugal) POR	Leonardo Lopes	3	0	0+1	0	1+0	0	1+0	0
Player(s) who left the club:
6	MF	(England) ENG	Max Power	1	0	0+1	0	0+0	0	0+0	0
9	FW	(Northern Ireland) NIR	Will Grigg	18	4	10+7	4	1+0	0	0+0	0
14	DF	(Northern Ireland) NIR	Alex Bruce	1	0	0+0	0	0+0	0	1+0	0
26	MF	(England) ENG	Callum Connolly	19	1	7+10	1	1+0	0	1+0	0
33	DF	(England) ENG	Dan Burn	14	0	13+1	0	0+0	0	0+0	0

=== Disciplinary record ===
As of 5 May 2019

Rank	No.	Nat.	Po.	Name	Championship			FA Cup			League Cup			Total		
Rank	No.	Nat.	Po.	Name	Yellow card	(yellow card) (yellow-red card)	Red card	Yellow card	(yellow card) (yellow-red card)	Red card	Yellow card	(yellow card) (yellow-red card)	Red card	Yellow card	(yellow card) (yellow-red card)	Red card
1	5	(Egypt)	CM	Sam Morsy	14	0	1	0	0	0	0	0	0	14	0	1
2	21	(Ivory Coast)	CB	Cédric Kipré	6	0	1	0	0	0	0	0	0	6	0	1
2	22	(England)	CB	Chey Dunkley	7	0	0	0	0	0	0	0	0	7	0	0
2	41	(England)	CF	Joe Garner	7	0	0	0	0	0	0	0	0	7	0	0
5	10	(England)	AM	Josh Windass	6	0	0	0	0	0	0	0	0	6	0	0
6	~~26~~	(England)	CM	Callum Connolly	4	0	0	1	0	0	0	0	0	5	0	0
6	36	(Wales)	CM	Lee Evans	5	0	0	0	0	0	0	0	0	5	0	0
8	2	(England)	RB	Nathan Byrne	3	0	0	1	0	0	0	0	0	4	0	0
8	12	(England)	RB	Reece James	4	0	0	0	0	0	0	0	0	4	0	0
8	20	(Scotland)	RM	Kal Naismith	3	0	1	0	0	0	0	0	0	3	0	1
8	25	(England)	AM	Nick Powell	4	0	0	0	0	0	0	0	0	4	0	0
12	1	(England)	GK	Christian Walton	3	0	0	0	0	0	0	0	0	3	0	0
12	8	(England)	CF	James Vaughan	3	0	0	0	0	0	0	0	0	3	0	0
12	15	(England)	RW	Callum McManaman	3	0	0	0	0	0	0	0	0	3	0	0
12	~~33~~	(England)	CB	Dan Burn	3	0	0	0	0	0	0	0	0	3	0	0
16	3	(United States)	LB	Antonee Robinson	2	0	0	0	0	0	0	0	0	2	0	0
16	4	(Republic of Ireland)	CM	Darron Gibson	1	0	1	0	0	0	0	0	0	1	0	1
16	9	(Northern Ireland)	CF	Will Grigg	2	0	0	0	0	0	0	0	0	2	0	0
16	11	(England)	RW	Gavin Massey	2	0	0	0	0	0	0	0	0	2	0	0
16	17	(England)	LW	Michael Jacobs	2	0	0	0	0	0	0	0	0	2	0	0
16	18	(England)	AM	Gary Roberts	2	0	0	0	0	0	0	0	0	2	0	0
22	6	(England)	LB	Danny Fox	1	0	0	0	0	0	0	0	0	1	0	0
22	13	(Republic of Ireland)	LW	Anthony Pilkington	1	0	0	0	0	0	0	0	0	1	0	0
22	14	(Northern Ireland)	CB	Alex Bruce	0	0	0	0	0	0	1	0	0	1	0	0
22	30	(Sweden)	CB	Jonas Olsson	1	0	0	0	0	0	0	0	0	1	0	0
Total					88	0	4	2	0	0	1	0	0	91	0	4
