= Connor Johnson =

English footballer (born 1998)

Personal information
- Full name: Connor William Johnson
- Date of birth: 10 March 1998 (age 28)
- Place of birth: Kettering, England
- Position: Centre back

Team information
- Current team: Spalding United

Youth career
- Northampton Town
- Wolverhampton Wanderers

Senior career*
Years	Team	Apps	(Gls)
2016–2020	Wolverhampton Wanderers	0	(0)
2017	→ Boreham Wood (loan)	0	(0)
2017–2018	→ AFC Telford United (loan)	27	(1)
2018–2019	→ Walsall (loan)	7	(0)
2019–2020	→ Kilmarnock (loan)	4	(0)
2020–2022	Kettering Town	38	(3)
2022–2024	Peterborough Sports	62	(0)
2024–2025	Kettering Town	34	(4)
2025–	Spalding United	0	(0)
- * Club domestic league appearances and goals as of 15:47, 17 May 2025 (UTC)

Connor William Johnson (born 10 March 1998) is an English professional footballer who plays as a central defender for National League North club Spalding United.

== Club career ==
Johnson started his youth career with the academy of Northampton Town and later joined the academy of Wolverhampton. While progressing through the youth ranks, he went on to captain the under-23 team. He signed his first professional contract with the club at the beginning of the 2016–17 season.

On 27 March 2017, Johnson was loaned out to Boreham Wood. On 5 September 2017, he was loaned out to AFC Telford United for one month. However, ten days later, he was handed a two-match suspension by the FA for playing an EFL Trophy match against Swansea City in January 2017 despite being ineligible for doing so. In February 2018, he extended his loan till the end of the season.

On 31 August 2018, Johnson was loaned out to League One club Walsall for the entire season. Four days later, he made his debut, starting in a 2–1 victory over Burton Albion in the EFL Trophy.

On 2 September 2019, Johnson signed for Scottish Premiership club Kilmarnock on a season-long loan. His contract with Wolves expired at the end of the season.

On 10 December 2020, Johnson signed for hometown club Kettering Town.

In June 2022, Johnson signed for newly promoted National League North club Peterborough Sports.

On 13 June 2024, Johnson returned to Southern League Premier Division Central side Kettering Town.

In May 2025, he joined Spalding United.

== Career statistics ==
As of 20 February 2020

Appearances and goals by club, season and competition
Club	Season	League			FA Cup		League Cup		Other		Total	
Club	Season	Division	Apps	Goals	Apps	Goals	Apps	Goals	Apps	Goals	Apps	Goals
Wolverhampton Wanderers	2016–17	Championship	0	0	0	0	0	0	—		0	0
Wolverhampton Wanderers	2017–18	Championship	0	0	0	0	0	0	—		0	0
Wolverhampton Wanderers	2018–19	Premier League	0	0	0	0	0	0	—		0	0
Wolverhampton Wanderers	2019–20	Premier League	0	0	0	0	0	0	0	0	0	0
Wolverhampton Wanderers	Total		0	0	0	0	0	0	0	0	0	0
Boreham Wood (loan)	2016–17	National League	0	0	—		0	0	0	0	0	0
AFC Telford United (loan)	2017–18	National League North	27	1	2	0	0	0	1 (Note: Appearance in FA Trophy)	0	30	1
Walsall (loan)	2018–19	League One	7	0	1	0	0	0	3 (Note: Appearances in EFL Trophy)	0	11	0
Kilmarnock (loan)	2019–20	Scottish Premiership	4	0	3	1	0	0	0	0	7	1
Career total			38	1	6	1	0	0	4	0	48	2

== Style of play ==
Johnson plays as a central defender. Sean Parrish (assistant manager of AFC Telford United) said that Johnson has "got a good attitude and he wants to learn, improve and play at a high level".
