= Takáč =

Takáč (feminine Takáčová) is a Slovak occupational surname meaning "weaver". It may refer to:

- Dalibor Takáč (b. 1997), Slovak footballer
- Dominik Takáč (born 1999), Slovak footballer
- Erik Takáč (b. 1975), Slovak footballer
- Ján Takáč (1909–1995), Czech long-distance runner
- Richard Takáč (born 1982), Slovak politician
- Samuel Takáč (b. 1991), Slovak ice hockey player

== See also ==
- Tkáč
