= 2019–20 Kilmarnock F.C. season =

Kilmarnock
2019–20 season
- Chairman: Billy Bowie
- Manager: Angelo Alessio; Alex Dyer
- Stadium: Rugby Park
- Premiership: 8th
- Scottish Cup: Fifth round
- League Cup: Quarter-final
- Europa League: First qualifying round
- Top goalscorer: League: Eamonn Brophy (9); All: Eamonn Brophy (11)
- Highest home attendance: 9,196 (vs Rangers, 4 August 2019)
- Lowest home attendance: 3,762 (vs Hamilton Academical, 17 August 2019)
- Average home league attendance: 5,856
Home colours	Away colours	Third colours

The 2019–20 season was Kilmarnock's seventh season in the Premiership, and their 27th consecutive season in the top flight of Scottish football.

Kilmarnock also competed in UEFA competition for the first time in 18 years after finishing in third the previous season.

== Overview ==
Killie began the season managed by Angelo Alessio who joined the club on 16 June 2019 after former manager Steve Clarke was signed by the Scotland national football team. On 28 June 2019, the club travelled to Spain for a pre-season training camp in Marbella as they prepared for their upcoming 2019–20 UEFA Europa League qualifiers.

The draw for the first qualifying round was held on 18 June 2019 with Kilmarnock drawn to face Welsh side Connah's Quay Nomads. The first leg was played in Wales on 11 July 2019 before Kilmarnock hosted the second leg on 18 July 2019. Connah's Quay's home ground, Deeside Stadium did not meet UEFA requirements so the game was instead played at Rhyl's home ground Belle Vue. Attempts had been made to play the game at Wrexham's Racecourse Ground in order to facilitate the expected number of supporters but the pitch works meant that wasn't possible. After a 2–1 comeback win in Wales, Kilmarnock lost 2–0 at Rugby Park and were knocked out by the Welsh part-timers 3–2 on aggregate.

Kilmarnock played Rangers at home in their first league fixture on Sunday 4 August 2019. The fixture was a repeat of the last match of the previous season which Kilmarnock won 2–1.

As a result of their European qualification, Kilmarnock received a bye to the League Cup second round. The draw was made on 28 July 2019 and Kilmarnock were drawn to play Premiership rivals Hamilton Academical on 17 August 2019. They lost to Hibernian on penalties in the following round.

In December 2019, Alex Dyer was made caretaker manager of Kilmarnock after Alessio was sacked. After three games in caretaker charge, Dyer was appointed Kilmarnock manager to the end of the 2019–20 season.

In January 2020, Kilmarnock entered the Scottish Cup in the fourth round where they defeated Queen's Park 6–0. In the fifth round, they lost 4–3 after extra time in a replay against Aberdeen.

On 13 March 2020 – with Kilmarnock eight in the table after a 1–0 loss to Hamilton Academical – all SPFL leagues were indefinitely suspended due to the COVID-19 pandemic.

In June 2020, manager Alex Dyer signed a permanent two-year contract with Kilmarnock.

== Match results ==
=== Pre-season and friendlies ===
Date	Opponents	Venue	Result F–A	Scorers
30 June 2019	Gaz Metan Mediaș	Campo La Quinta	0–0	
3 July 2019	Dinamo București	Marbella Football Centre	0–3	

=== Premiership ===
Date	Opponents	H / A	Result F–A	Scorers	Attendance	League position
4 August 2019	Rangers	H	1–2	O'Donnell 83'	9,196	9th
10 August 2019	Hamilton Academical	A	0–2		2,766	12th
24 August 2019	Aberdeen	H	0–0		5,250	12th
31 August 2019	St Johnstone	A	1–0	O'Donnell 40'	3,427	6th
14 September 2019	Hibernian	H	2–0	Millar 56', El Makrini 79'	5,458	6th
22 September 2019	Celtic	A	1–3	Brophy 33'	57,137	7th
28 September 2019	Ross County	H	0–0		4,906	7th
5 October 2019	Heart of Midlothian	A	1–0	Burke 42'	16,711	6th
19 October 2019	Livingston	H	2–1	Dicker 39', McKenzie 55'	4,828	5th
26 October 2019	St Mirren	H	1–0	Dicker 78'	6,389	3rd
30 October 2019	Motherwell	A	1–2	Thomas 31'	4,676	5th
2 November 2019	Aberdeen	A	0–3		13,131	5th
9 November 2019	Hamilton Academical	H	2–2	El Makrini 45+2', Brophy 48'	5,045	5th
23 November 2019	Heart of Midlothian	H	3–0	Burke 9', 16' Brophy 14'	6,278	5th
30 November 2019	Hibernian	A	2–2	Bruce 66' Del Fabro 90+3'	16,180	5th
4 December 2019	St Johnstone	H	0–0		4,083	5th
7 December 2019	Livingston	A	0–3		1,531	5th
14 December 2019	Ross County	A	0–1		3,688	5th
21 December 2019	Motherwell	H	0–1		5,688	5th
26 December 2019	Rangers	A	0–1		49,885	6th
29 December 2019	St Mirren	A	0–1		6,363	7th
22 January 2020	Celtic	H	1–3	Kabamba 66'	8,307	7th
25 January 2020	St Johnstone	A	1–2	Burke 22' (pen.)	2,609	7th
1 February 2020	Ross County	H	3–1	Brophy 54', 57' (pen.), Kabamba 82'	4,733	7th
5 February 2020	Heart of Midlothian	A	3–2	Findlay 24', Burke 38', Brophy 50'	16,211	7th
12 February 2020	Rangers	H	2–1	O'Donnell 77', Brophy 89'	8,096	7th
16 February 2020	Hibernian	H	1–2	Burke 30'	5,370	7th
23 February 2020	Celtic	A	1–3	Brophy 6' (pen.)	58,883	7th
4 March 2020	Aberdeen	H	2–2	Brophy 17' (pen.), Kiltie 23'	4,217	7th
7 March 2020	Hamilton Academical	A	1–0		2,145	8th
14 March 2020	St Mirren	H	Cancelled			8th
21 March 2020	Motherwell	A	Cancelled			8th
4 April 2020	Livingston	H	Cancelled			8th

=== Scottish Cup ===
Date	Round	Opponents	H / A	Result F–A	Scorers	Attendance
18 January 2020	Fourth round	Queen's Park	H	6–0	Bruce 9', Findlay 26', 44', Kiltie 62', Kabamba 89', Johnson 90+1'	4,198
8 February 2020	Fifth round	Aberdeen	A	0–0		9,430
19 February 2020	Fifth round replay	Aberdeen	H	3–4 (a.e.t.)	El Makrini 43', Brophy 98', Kabamba 116'	5,658

=== League Cup ===
Date	Round	Opponents	H / A	Result F–A	Scorers	Attendance
17 August 2019	Second round	Hamilton Academical	H	1–0 (a.e.t.)	Thomas 113'	3,762
25 September 2019	Quarter-final	Hibernian	H	0–0 (a.e.t.); 4–5p		4,780

=== Europa League ===
Date	Round	Opponents	H / A	Result F–A	Scorers	Attendance
11 July 2019	First qualifying round 1st leg	(Wales) Connah's Quay Nomads	A	2–1	Brophy 82' (pen.), Findlay 90+2'	1,410
18 July 2019	First qualifying round 2nd leg	(Wales) Connah's Quay Nomads	H	0–2		8,306

== Squad statistics ==
No.	Pos.	Name	League		Scottish Cup		League Cup		Europa League		Total		Discipline	
No.	Pos.	Name	Apps	Goals	Apps	Goals	Apps	Goals	Apps	Goals	Apps	Goals	Yellow card	Red card
1	GK	(Scotland) Jamie MacDonald	0	0	0	0	0	0	2	0	2	0	0	0
2	DF	(Scotland) Stephen O'Donnell	28	3	3	0	2	0	2	0	35	3	1	0
3	DF	(Scotland) Greg Taylor	2	0	0	0	1	0	2	0	5	0	0	0
3	DF	(Scotland) Stephen Hendrie	2	0	0	0	0	0	0	0	2	0	0	0
4	DF	(Northern Ireland) Alex Bruce	16	1	1	1	0	0	0	0	17	2	3	1
5	DF	(England) Connor Johnson	4	0	3	1	0	0	0	0	7	1	1	0
6	MF	(Republic of Ireland) Alan Power	28	0	3	0	2	0	2	0	35	0	13	1
7	MF	(Scotland) Rory McKenzie	27	1	1	0	2	0	2	0	32	1	5	0
8	MF	(Republic of Ireland) Gary Dicker	30	2	3	0	2	0	2	0	37	2	9	0
9	FW	(Scotland) Eamonn Brophy	28	9	2	1	2	0	2	1	34	11	1	0
10	MF	(Scotland) Greg Kiltie	10	1	2	1	1	0	1	0	14	2	1	0
11	FW	(Canada) Liam Millar	20	1	0	0	2	0	0	0	22	1	2	0
11	MF	(England) Harry Bunn	3	0	1	0	0	0	0	0	4	0	0	0
12	GK	(Romania) Laurențiu Brănescu	26	0	2	0	2	0	0	0	30	0	4	1
13	GK	(Scotland) Devlin MacKay	0	0	0	0	0	0	0	0	0	0	0	0
14	DF	(Finland) Niko Hämäläinen	28	0	3	0	1	0	0	0	32	0	0	0
15	MF	(Netherlands) Mohamed El Makrini	21	2	2	1	2	0	2	0	27	3	6	0
16	FW	(Canada) Simeon Jackson	4	0	0	0	0	0	0	0	4	0	0	0
17	DF	(Scotland) Stuart Findlay	18	1	2	2	2	0	2	1	24	4	2	1
18	DF	(Scotland) Calum Waters	0	0	0	0	0	0	0	0	0	0	0	0
19	DF	(Scotland) Kirk Broadfoot	9	0	2	0	1	0	2	0	13	0	2	0
20	MF	(Scotland) Iain Wilson	4	0	0	0	0	0	0	0	4	0	1	0
21	MF	(Scotland) Adam Frizzell	0	0	0	0	0	0	0	0	0	0	0	0
22	DF	(Scotland) Ross Millen	4	0	2	0	0	0	0	0	6	0	0	0
23	MF	(Scotland) Dom Thomas	20	1	0	0	2	1	2	0	24	2	0	0
24	GK	(Slovenia) Jan Koprivec	5	0	1	0	0	0	0	0	6	0	0	0
25	FW	(Scotland) Harvey St Clair	2	0	0	0	1	0	0	0	3	0	0	0
26	DF	(Italy) Dario Del Fabro	22	1	1	0	1	0	0	0	24	1	4	0
26	FW	(Sweden) Osman Sow	8	0	0	0	1	0	0	0	9	0	0	0
27	FW	(England) Nicke Kabamba	9	2	3	2	0	0	0	0	12	4	0	0
29	MF	(Scotland) Chris Burke	26	5	2	0	2	0	2	0	32	5	4	0
31	MF	(Scotland) Innes Cameron	1	0	0	0	1	0	1	0	3	0	0	0
33	MF	(Scotland) Ally Taylor	1	0	0	0	0	0	0	0	1	0	0	0
52	FW	(Scotland) Kyle Connell	1	0	1	0	0	0	0	0	2	0	0	0

== Club statistics ==
=== Competition overview ===
Competition	First match	Last match	Starting round	Final position	Record							
Competition	First match	Last match	Starting round	Final position	Pld	W	D	L	GF	GA	GD	Win %
Premiership	4 August 2019	7 March 2020	Matchday 1	Eighth	30	9	6	15	31	41	−10	30.00
Scottish Cup	18 January 2020	19 February 2020	Fourth round	Fifth round replay	3	1	1	1	9	4	+5	33.33
League Cup	17 August 2019	25 September 2019	Second round	Quarter-final	2	1	1	0	1	0	+1	50.00
Europa League	11 July 2019	18 July 2019	First qualifying round	First qualifying round	2	1	0	1	2	3	−1	50.00
Total					37	12	8	17	43	48	−5	32.43

Source: Competitions

=== League table ===
Pos	Team	Pld	W	D	L	GF	GA	GD	Pts	PPG	Qualification or relegation (Note: All play-off matches were cancelled, as clubs voted to curtail the season due to the COVID-19 pandemic.)
6	St Johnstone	29	8	12	9	28	46	−18	36	1.24	
7	Hibernian	30	9	10	11	42	49	−7	37	1.23	
8	Kilmarnock	30	9	6	15	31	41	−10	33	1.10	
9	St Mirren	30	7	8	15	24	41	−17	29	0.97	
10	Ross County	30	7	8	15	29	60	−31	29	0.97	

Source: BBC SPFL
Rules for classification: 1) Points per game; 2) Goal difference; 3) Goals scored; 4) Head-to-head points; 5) Head-to-Head goal difference; 6) Play-off (only if deciding champion, UEFA competitions qualification, second stage group allocation or relegation).

== Player transfers ==
=== Transfers in ===
Date	Position	Name	Previous club	Fee	Ref.
8 July 2019	GK	(Romania) Laurențiu Brănescu	(Italy) Juventus	Loan	
9 July 2019	MF	(Netherlands) Mohamed El Makrini	(Netherlands) Roda JC	Free	
6 August 2019	FW	(Canada) Liam Millar	(England) Liverpool	Loan	
20 August 2019	DF	(Finland) Niko Hämäläinen	(England) Queens Park Rangers	Loan	
29 August 2019	DF	(Italy) Dario Del Fabro	(Italy) Juventus	Loan	
2 September 2019	FW	(Sweden) Osman Sow	Dundee United	Loan	
2 September 2019	DF	(England) Connor Johnson	(England) Wolverhampton Wanderers	Loan	
2 September 2019	FW	Harvey St Clair	(Italy) Venezia	Loan	
6 September 2019	DF	Stephen Hendrie	(England) Southend United	Free	
10 September 2019	GK	(Slovenia) Jan Koprivec	Unattached	Free	
17 October 2019	FW	(Canada) Simeon Jackson	Unattached	Free	
15 January 2020	MF	(England) Harry Bunn	Unattached	Free	
17 January 2020	FW	(England) Nicke Kabamba	(England) Hartlepool United	Undisclosed	
31 January 2020	DF	Kirk Broadfoot	St Mirren	Undisclosed	

=== Transfers out ===
Date	Position	Name	Subsequent Club	Fee	Ref
18 June 2019	FW	Kris Boyd	Retired	n/a	
20 June 2019	DF	Scott Boyd	Retired	n/a	
1 July 2019	MF	(Northern Ireland) Jordan Jones	Rangers	Free	
16 July 2019	MF	Daniel Higgins	Cove Rangers	Free	
9 August 2019	MF	Calum Waters	St Mirren	Loan	
2 September 2019	DF	Greg Taylor	Celtic	£2,200,000	
2 September 2019	MF	Greg Kiltie	Dunfermline Athletic	Loan	
3 September 2019	DF	Kirk Broadfoot	St Mirren	Free	
13 September 2019	GK	Jamie MacDonald	Alloa Athletic	Loan	
1 October 2019	MF	Adam Frizzell	Dumbarton	Loan	
10 January 2020	MF	Dom Thomas	Dunfermline Athletic	Loan	
20 January 2020	FW	(Canada) Simeon Jackson	(England) Stevenage	Free	
31 January 2020	DF	(Northern Ireland) Alex Bruce	Free Agent	Free	

== Notes ==
1. Note 1: Alessio was sacked on 17 December 2019 and was replaced, initially as caretaker, by Dyer.
2. Note 2: After starting the season with Kilmarnock, Broadfoot signed for St Mirren in August before returning in January. Broadfoot has worn the number 19 jersey since returning as the number 5 jersey had been taken by Johnson in his absence.
