= 2017 Toulon Tournament =

45ème Festival International "Espoirs" – Tournoi Maurice Revello (in French)

Tournament details
- Host country: France
- Dates: 29 May – 10 June 2017
- Teams: 12 (from 5 confederations)
- Venues: 4 (in 4 host cities)

Final positions
- Champions: England (6th title)
- Runners-up: Ivory Coast
- Third place: Scotland
- Fourth place: Czech Republic

Tournament statistics
- Matches played: 22
- Goals scored: 61 (2.77 per match)
- Top scorer(s): (Angola) Chico Banza (England) Harvey Barnes (England) George Hirst (4 goals each)
- Best player: (England) David Brooks
- Best goalkeeper: (Wales) Luke Pilling

The 2017 Toulon Tournament (officially French: 45ème Festival International "Espoirs" – Tournoi Maurice Revello) was the 45th edition of the Toulon Tournament. The tournament was named after Maurice Revello, who started the tournament in 1967 and died in 2016. It was held in the department of Bouches-du-Rhône from 29 May to 10 June 2017. The 2017 edition was the first to feature 12 teams.

The tournament was won by the defending champions England, who claimed their sixth title, beating Ivory Coast 5–3 in a penalty shootout after the game ended 1–1.

== Participants ==
Twelve participating teams were announced on April 12, 2017.

AFC

- Bahrain (1st participation)
- Indonesia (1st participation)
- Japan (12th participation)

CAF

- Angola (3rd participation)
- Ivory Coast (9th participation)

CONCACAF

- Cuba (1st participation)

CONMEBOL

- Brazil (16th participation)

UEFA

- Czech Republic (5th participation)
- England^{TH} (19th participation)
- France (40th participation)
- Scotland (8th participation)
- Wales (1st participation)

== Squads ==
The twelve national teams involved in the tournament were required to register a squad of 20 Under-20 players.

== Venues ==
A total of four cities hosted the tournament.

2017 Toulon Tournament is located in Provence-Alpes-Côte d'Azur
Aubagne	Fos-sur-Mer
Stade de Lattre-de-Tassigny	Stade Parsemain
43.2939°N 5.5623°E	43.4687°N 4.9489°E
Capacity: 1,000	Capacity: 17,170
Salon-de-Provence	Vitrolles
Stade d'Honneur Marcel Roustan	Stade Jules-Ladoumègue
43.6356°N 5.0928°E	43.4578°N 5.2433°E
Capacity: 4,000	Capacity: 1,500

== Match officials ==
The referees were:

(Angola) Hélder Martins de Carvalho^{[a]} and António Muachihuissa Caxala

Assistants: Estanislau Guedes Prata

(Czech Republic) Pavel Orel

Assistants: Jakub Hrabovský and Tomáš Mokrusch

(France) Karim Abed

Assistants: Mehdi Rahmouni and Benjamin Pagès

(Greece) Anastasios Papapetrou

Assistants: Ioannis Toumpakaris and Tryfon Petropoulos

(Japan) Yusuke Araki

Assistants: Toshiyuki Tanaka and Jun Mihara

(Malta) Alan Mario Sant

Assistants: Luke Portelli and Christopher Lawrence Francalanza

(Romania) Radu Petrescu

Assistants: Vasile Marinescu and Radu-Adrian-Ştefan Ghinguleac

(Scotland) Don Robertson

Assistants: Jordan Stokoe and Dougie Potter

Hélder Martins de Carvalho took an assistant's place during the tournament.

== Matches rules ==
Every match consisted of two periods of 40 minutes each. In a match, every team had nine named substitutes and the maximum number of substitutions permitted was four.
In the knockout stage, if a game tied at the end of regulation time, extra time would not be played and the penalty shoot-out would be used to determine the winner.

== Group stage ==
The draw was held on 15 April 2017. The twelve teams were drawn into three groups of four. The group winners and the best second-placed team qualified for the semi-finals. The Group stage was played from 29 May to 6 June 2017.

=== Group A ===
Pos	Team	Pld	W	D	L	GF	GA	GD	Pts	Qualification
1	England	3	3	0	0	10	2	+8	9	Advance to knockout stage
2	Angola	3	1	1	1	6	3	+3	4	
3	Japan	3	0	2	1	3	4	−1	2	
4	Cuba	3	0	1	2	3	13	−10	1	

Source: Standings
29 May 2017
17:00 CEST

Japan	1–1	Cuba
Ito 54'	Report	Oviedo 71'

Stade de Lattre-de-Tassigny, Aubagne
Referee: Don Robertson (Scotland)
29 May 2017
19:30 CEST

England	1–0	Angola
Ugbo 45'	Report

Stade de Lattre-de-Tassigny, Aubagne
Referee: Karim Abed (France)

1 June 2017
17:00 CEST

Angola	1–1	Japan
Chico Banza 80+3'	Report	Sasaki 52' (pen.)

Stade d'Honneur Marcel Roustan, Salon-de-Provence
Referee: Pavel Orel (Czech Republic)
1 June 2017
19:30 CEST

England	7–1	Cuba
Barnes 18', 44'; Hirst 33', 53', 64' (pen.); Brooks 60'; Taylor-Crossdale 76' (pen.)	Report	Puga 37'

Stade d'Honneur Marcel Roustan, Salon-de-Provence
Referee: Alan Mario Sant (Malta)

4 June 2017
15:00 CEST

Japan	1–2	England
Ando 53'	Report	Hirst 25' (pen.); Taylor-Crossdale 72' (pen.)

Stade de Lattre-de-Tassigny, Aubagne
Referee: Anastasios Papapetrou (Greece)
4 June 2017
19:30 CEST

Angola	5–1	Cuba
Chico Banza 1', 39', 52'; Rui 41'; Vá 73'	Report	Tuero 67'

Stade de Lattre-de-Tassigny, Aubagne
Referee: Don Robertson (Scotland)

=== Group B ===
Pos	Team	Pld	W	D	L	GF	GA	GD	Pts	Qualification
1	Ivory Coast	3	2	1	0	5	3	+2	7	Advance to knockout stage
2	Wales	3	1	2	0	3	2	+1	5	
3	France (H)	3	1	1	1	7	3	+4	4	
4	Bahrain	3	0	0	3	1	8	−7	0	

Source: Standings
(H) Hosts
30 May 2017
17:00 CEST

Ivory Coast	1–0	Bahrain
Gnoukouri 38'	Report

Stade de Lattre-de-Tassigny, Aubagne
Referee: Alan Mario Sant (Malta)
30 May 2017
19:30 CEST

France	0–0	Wales
	Report

Stade de Lattre-de-Tassigny, Aubagne
Referee: Radu Petrescu (Romania)

2 June 2017
17:00 CEST

Bahrain	0–1	Wales
	Report	James 77' (pen.)

Stade Parsemain, Fos-sur-Mer
Referee: Don Robertson (Scotland)
2 June 2017
19:30 CEST

France	1–2	Ivory Coast
Marcel 44'	Report	Lazare 61'; Touré 79'

Stade Parsemain, Fos-sur-Mer
Referee: Yusuke Araki (Japan)

5 June 2017
17:00 CEST

Wales	2–2	Ivory Coast
G. Thomas 7', 80+2'	Report	Tiéhi 50'; Krasso 62'

Stade de Lattre-de-Tassigny, Aubagne
Referee: Pavel Orel (Czech Republic)
5 June 2017
19:30 CEST

Bahrain	1–6	France
Khalid 19'	Report	Nordin 4'; Mateta 44'; Boutobba 48' (pen.), 64'; Barka 56'; Osei 80+1'

Stade de Lattre-de-Tassigny, Aubagne
Referee: Yusuke Araki (Japan)

=== Group C ===
Pos	Team	Pld	W	D	L	GF	GA	GD	Pts	Qualification
1	Czech Republic	3	2	1	0	5	2	+3	7	Advance to knockout stage
2	Scotland	3	2	0	1	5	4	+1	6	Advance to knockout stage
3	Brazil	3	1	1	1	1	1	0	4	
4	Indonesia	3	0	0	3	1	5	−4	0	

Source: Standings
31 May 2017
17:00 CEST

Czech Republic	3–2	Scotland
Chvěja 35'; Šašinka 41'; Graiciar 59'	Report	Burke 1', 55' (pen.)

Stade d'Honneur Marcel Roustan, Salon-de-Provence
Referee: Anastasios Papapetrou (Greece)
31 May 2017
19:30 CEST

Brazil	1–0	Indonesia
Gabriel Novaes 37'	Report

Stade d'Honneur Marcel Roustan, Salon-de-Provence
Referee: António Caxala (Angola)

3 June 2017
15:00 CEST

Czech Republic	2–0	Indonesia
Kašiar 12'; Šašinka 77'	Report

Stade Parsemain, Fos-sur-Mer
Referee: Karim Abed (France)
3 June 2017
17:30 CEST

Scotland	1–0	Brazil
Taylor 35'	Report

Stade Parsemain, Fos-sur-Mer
Referee: Radu Petrescu (Romania)

6 June 2017
17:00 CEST

Indonesia	1–2	Scotland
Saghara 23'	Report	Hardie 32', 63' (pen.)

Stade Jules-Ladoumègue, Vitrolles
Referee: Alan Mario Sant (Malta)
6 June 2017
19:30 CEST

Brazil	0–0	Czech Republic
	Report

Stade Jules-Ladoumègue, Vitrolles
Referee: António Caxala (Angola)

== Knockout stage ==
The knockout stage was played on 8 and 10 June 2017.

Semi-finals
8 June – Fos-sur-Mer
England	3
Scotland	0
8 June – Fos-sur-Mer
Ivory Coast	2
Czech Republic	1

Final
10 June – Aubagne
England (p)	1 (5)
Ivory Coast	1 (3)
Third place
10 June – Aubagne
Scotland	3
Czech Republic	0

=== Semi-finals ===
8 June 2017
17:00 CEST

England	3–0	Scotland
Barnes 6', 68'; Embleton 50'	Report

Stade Parsemain, Fos-sur-Mer
Referee: António Caxala (Angola)
8 June 2017
19:30 CEST

Ivory Coast	2–1	Czech Republic
Lazare 2'; Krasso 38'	Report	Novotný 21'

Stade Parsemain, Fos-sur-Mer
Referee: Anastasios Papapetrou (Greece)

=== Third place playoff ===
10 June 2017
15:00 CEST

Scotland	3–0	Czech Republic
Hardie 43'; Wighton 57'; Granečný 80+2' (o.g.)	Report

Stade de Lattre-de-Tassigny, Aubagne
Referee: Alan Mario Sant (Malta)

=== Final ===
10 June 2017
17:30 CEST

England	1–1	Ivory Coast
Brooks 13'	Report	Loba 80+1' (pen.)
Penalties
Ugbo (penalty scored); Embleton (penalty scored); Barnes (penalty scored); Slattery (penalty scored); Vieira (penalty scored)	5–3	(penalty scored) Loba; (penalty scored) Diaby; (penalty scored) Kouyaté; (penalty missed) Lazare

Stade de Lattre-de-Tassigny, Aubagne
Referee: Pavel Orel (Czech Republic)

== Goalscorers ==
61 goals were scored in 22 matches, for an average of 2.77 goals per match.

4 goals

- (Angola) Chico Banza
- (England) Harvey Barnes
- (England) George Hirst

3 goals

- (Scotland) Ryan Hardie

2 goals

- (Czech Republic) Ondřej Šašinka
- (England) David Brooks
- (England) Martell Taylor-Crossdale
- (France) Bilal Boutobba
- (Ivory Coast) Jean-Philippe Krasso
- (Ivory Coast) Jean Thierry Lazare
- (Scotland) Oliver Burke
- (Wales) George Thomas

1 goal

- (Angola) Rui
- (Angola) Vá
- (Bahrain) Abdulaziz Khalid
- (Brazil) Gabriel Novaes
- (Cuba) Rolando Oviedo
- (Cuba) Eduardo Puga
- (Cuba) Lázaro Tuero
- (Czech Republic) Ondřej Chvěja
- (Czech Republic) Martin Graiciar
- (Czech Republic) Roman Kašiar
- (Czech Republic) Ondřej Novotný
- (England) Elliot Embleton
- (England) Iké Ugbo
- (France) Yanis Barka
- (France) Vincent Marcel
- (France) Jean-Philippe Mateta
- (France) Arnaud Nordin
- (France) Derick Osei
- (Indonesia) Hanis Saghara Putra
- (Ivory Coast) Wilfried Gnoukouri
- (Ivory Coast) Aké Arnaud Loba
- (Ivory Coast) Christ Tiéhi
- (Ivory Coast) Yaya Kader Touré
- (Japan) Mizuki Ando
- (Japan) Hiroki Ito
- (Japan) Takumi Sasaki
- (Scotland) Greg Taylor
- (Scotland) Craig Wighton
- (Wales) Daniel James

Own goal

- (Czech Republic) Denis Granečný (playing against Scotland)

Source: Toulon Tournament

== Awards ==
=== Individual awards ===
After the final, the following players were rewarded for their performances during the competition.

- Best player: (England) David Brooks
- Second best player: (England) Joe Worrall
- Third best player: (Ivory Coast) Jean Thierry Lazare
- Fourth best player: (Scotland) Greg Taylor
- Breakthrough player: (Indonesia) Egy Maulana
- Best goalkeeper: (Wales) Luke Pilling
- Younger player of the final: (England) Reece James
- Best goal of the tournament: (Japan) Hiroki Ito (playing against Cuba)
- Fair-Play: England

=== Best XI ===
The best XI team was a squad consisting of the eleven most impressive players at the tournament.

Pos.	Player
GK	(Wales) Luke Pilling
DF	(England) Reece James
DF	(England) Joe Worrall
DF	(Ivory Coast) Souleymane Diaby
DF	(Scotland) Greg Taylor
MF	(Czech Republic) Michal Sadílek
MF	(Ivory Coast) Jean Thierry Lazare
MF	(England) David Brooks
FW	(Wales) George Thomas
FW	(England) George Hirst
FW	(England) Harvey Barnes
