= Luke Pilling =

Welsh footballer

Personal information
- Full name: Luke Arthur Pilling
- Date of birth: 25 July 1997 (age 29)
- Place of birth: Birkenhead, England
- Height: 6 ft 0 in (1.83 m)
- Position: Goalkeeper

Team information
- Current team: Warrington Rylands

Youth career
- Tranmere Rovers

Senior career*
Years	Team	Apps	(Gls)
2017–2020	Tranmere Rovers	3	(0)
2018–2019	→ Ashton United (loan)	17	(0)
2020–2021	Notts County	3	(0)
2021–2022	Stafford Rangers	24	(0)
2022–2023	AFC Telford United		
2023–	Warrington Rylands		

International career
2017	Wales U20	3	(0)
2017–2018	Wales U21	8	(0)
- * Club domestic league appearances and goals as of 20:12, 4 July 2022 (UTC)

Luke Arthur Pilling (born 25 July 1997) is a professional footballer who plays as a goalkeeper for Warrington Rylands. He is a former Wales under-21 international.

== Club career ==
Pilling began his career with Tranmere Rovers, joining the club at the age of six. He made his senior debut on 29 April 2017 in a 1–0 victory over Maidstone United in the National League. He spent the 2018–19 season on loan with National League North side Ashton United, making 17 league appearances.

Pilling signed a new one-year contract with Tranmere following the club's promotion to League One at the end of the 2018–19 season. Pilling made his Football League debut on 7 December 2019 as a first half substitute in place of injured starting goalkeeper Scott Davies during a 1–1 draw with Accrington Stanley.

On 4 September 2020, Pilling signed for National League side Notts County.

== International career ==
In May 2017, Pilling was named in the Wales under-20 squad for the 2017 Toulon Tournament. After making his debut for the side in the tournament opener against Ivory Coast, Pilling played in Wales' remaining group matches against France and Bahrain as they were eliminated in the group stage. Pilling was later named Goalkeeper of the Tournament for his performances.

== Personal life ==
Pilling is the maternal grandson of former Tranmere Rovers player Terry Stephens (footballer).

== Career statistics ==
As of match played 7 December 2019

Appearances and goals by club, season and competition
Club	Season	Division	League		FA Cup		EFL Cup		Other		Total	
Club	Season	Division	Apps	Goals	Apps	Goals	Apps	Goals	Apps	Goals	Apps	Goals
Tranmere Rovers	2016–17	National League	1	0	0	0	0	0	0	0	1	0
Tranmere Rovers	2017–18	National League	1	0	0	0	0	0	1 (Note: Appearance in FA Trophy)	0	2	0
Tranmere Rovers	2018–19	League Two	0	0	0	0	0	0	0	0	0	0
Tranmere Rovers	2019–20	League One	1	0	0	0	0	0	3 (Note: Appearance in EFL Trophy)	0	4	0
Tranmere Rovers	Tranmere Rovers total		3	0	0	0	0	0	4	0	7	0
Ashton United	2018–19	National League North	17	0	1	0	0	0	0	0	18	0
Career total			20	0	1	0	0	0	4	0	25	0

== Honours ==
Tranmere Rovers

- EFL League Two play-offs: 2019

Individual

- Toulon Tournament Best Goalkeeper: 2017
