= Wales national under-20 football team =

National U-20 association football team

Wales Under-20
- Nickname: Young Dragons (Welsh: Dreigiau Ifanc)
- Association: Football Association of Wales (FAW)
- Head coach: Rob Page (2017)
First colours	Second colours

FIFA U-20 World Cup
- Appearances: 0

The Wales national under-20 football team, controlled by the Football Association of Wales, is Wales' national under 20 football team and is considered to be a feeder team for the Wales national football team. The team represented Wales in the 2017 Toulon Tournament.

== Squad ==
The Wales squad for the 2017 Toulon Tournament was announced in May 2017. Players born between 1 January 1997 and 31 December 1999 were eligible for the tournament. Ben Woodburn and Harry Wilson were not available due to their inclusion in the Wales senior squad. Rhys Norrington-Davies, Mitch Clark, David Brooks, Aron Davies and Matthew Smith withdrew from the squad, and were replaced by Cian Harries, Aaron Lewis, Keiran Evans, Chris Mepham and Lloyd Humphries respectively.

No.	Pos.	Player	Date of birth (age)	Caps	Goals	Club
	GK	Luke Pilling	25 July 1997 (age 29)	3	0	(The Football Association) Tranmere Rovers
	GK	Lewis Thomas	20 September 1997 (age 29)	0	0	(Football Association of Wales) Swansea City
	DF	Joe Rodon	22 October 1997 (age 29)	3	0	(Football Association of Wales) Swansea City
	DF	Cameron Coxe	18 December 1998 (age 27)	2	0	(Football Association of Wales) Cardiff City
	DF	Rhys Abbruzzese	23 March 1998 (age 28)	2	0	(Football Association of Wales) Cardiff City
	DF	Aaron Lewis	26 June 1998 (age 28)	2	0	(Football Association of Wales) Swansea City
	DF	Cian Harries	1 April 1997 (age 29)	2	0	(The Football Association) Coventry City
	DF	Cole Dasilva	11 May 1999 (age 27)	1	0	(The Football Association) Chelsea
	DF	Chris Mepham	5 November 1997 (age 29)	1	0	(The Football Association) Brentford
	MF	Jack Evans	25 April 1998 (age 28)	3	0	(Football Association of Wales) Swansea City
	MF	Regan Poole	18 June 1998 (age 28)	3	0	(The Football Association) Manchester United
	MF	Rhyle Ovenden	10 August 1998 (age 28)	1	0	(The Football Association) Watford
	MF	Kieran Evans	27 March 1999 (age 27)	0	0	(Football Association of Wales) Swansea City
	MF	Lloyd Humphries	3 October 1997 (age 29)	0	0	(Football Association of Wales) Cardiff City
	FW	George Thomas	24 March 1997 (age 29)	3	2	(The Football Association) Coventry City
	FW	Daniel James	10 November 1997 (age 28)	3	1	(Football Association of Wales) Swansea City
	FW	Nathan Broadhead	5 April 1998 (age 28)	3	0	(The Football Association) Everton
	FW	Mark Harris	28 December 1998 (age 27)	3	0	(Football Association of Wales) Cardiff City
	FW	Liam Cullen	23 April 1999 (age 27)	3	0	(Football Association of Wales) Swansea City
	FW	Tyler Roberts	12 January 1999 (age 27)	2	0	(The Football Association) West Bromwich Albion

== See also ==
- Football Association of Wales
- Wales national football team
- Wales national under-21 football team
- Wales national under-19 football team
- Wales national under-18 football team
- Wales national under-17 football team
