= Kosuke Tanaka (footballer) =

Japanese footballer (born 1999)

Personal information
- Date of birth: 1 February 1999 (age 27)
- Place of birth: Nara, Nara, Japan
- Height: 1.70 m (5 ft 7 in)
- Position: Defender

Team information
- Current team: AC Nagano Parceiro
- Number: 25

Youth career
- –2010: Diablossa Takada FC
- 2011–2016: Kyoto Sanga

College career
| Years | Team | Apps | (Gls) |
| 2017–2020 | Ritsumeikan University | | |

Senior career*
| Years | Team | Apps | (Gls) |
| 2021–2024 | Fukushima United | 97 | (1) |
| 2024- | AC Nagano Parceiro | 63 | (3) |

International career^{‡}
| 2015 | Japan U17 | 1 | (0) |
| 2017 | Japan U19 | 2 | (0) |
- * Club domestic league appearances and goals as of 17 August 2026 ‡ National team caps and goals as of 17:04, 14 March 2021 (UTC)

Kosuke Tanaka (田中 康介, Tanaka Kosuke; born 1 February 1999) is a Japanese footballer currently playing as a defender for AC Nagano Parceiro.

== Career statistics ==
=== Club ===
As of 14 March 2021.

| Club | Season | League | | | National Cup | | League Cup | | Other | | Total | |
| Club | Season | Division | Apps | Goals | Apps | Goals | Apps | Goals | Apps | Goals | Apps | Goals |
|---|---|---|---|---|---|---|---|---|---|---|---|---|
| Ritsumeikan University | 2019 | – | | | 2 (Note: Appearances in the Emperor's Cup) | 2 | – | | 0 | 0 | 2 | 2 |
| Fukushima United | 2021 | J3 League | 3 | 0 | 0 | 0 | – | | 0 | 0 | 3 | 0 |
| Career total | | | 3 | 0 | 2 | 2 | 0 | 0 | 0 | 0 | 5 | 2 |
