= Koffi Dakoi =

Ivorian footballer

Personal information
- Full name: Koffi Sebastien Edgard Dakoi
- Date of birth: 26 August 1999 (age 27)
- Place of birth: Agboville, Ivory Coast
- Height: 1.63 m (5 ft 4 in)
- Position: Defensive midfielder

Team information
- Current team: ASEC Mimosas

Youth career
- Ivoire Academie
- 2017: Tigres UANL

Senior career*
Years	Team	Apps	(Gls)
2018–2020	Tigres Premier	11	(0)
2018	→ Universidad San Martín (loan)	34	(2)
2019	→ Correcaminos UAT	4	(0)
2020	SC Gagnoa	?	(?)
2020-2024	LYS Sassandra	?	(?)
2024-	ASEC Mimosas	0	(0)

International career
2017	Ivory Coast U20	4	(0)
- * Club domestic league appearances and goals as of 13:35, 6 May 2019 (UTC)

Koffi Sebastien Edgard Dakoi (born 26 August 1999) is an Ivorian footballer who plays for ASEC Mimosas. Mainly a defensive midfielder, he can also play as a right back.

== Club career ==
Born in Agboville, Dakoi joined Tigres UANL on 8 September 2017, from local side Ivoire Academie. Assigned to Tigres Premier, he made his senior debut on 6 January 2018 by starting in a 1–1 home draw against Monarcas Morelia Premier.

On 28 March 2018, Dakoi was loaned to Peruvian Primera División side Universidad San Martín until the end of the year. He made his professional debut three days later, coming on as a second-half substitute in a 1–1 home draw against Comerciantes Unidos.

Dakoi scored his first professional goal on 25 November 2018, netting the opener in a 1–1 home draw against FBC Melgar.
