= Ján Tkáč =

Slovak chemist

- Born: May 10, 1972 (age 54); Poprad, Czechoslovakia (now Slovakia)
- Education: Slovak University of Technology in Bratislava
- Known for: Being the first scientist based in Slovakia to receive the European Research Council grant
- Scientific career
- Fields: Chemistry
- Workplaces: Slovak Academy of Sciences; Glycanostics
- Doctoral advisor: Ernest Šturdík

Ján Tkáč (born 10 May 1972) in Poprad is a Slovak chemist known for being the first Slovak scientist based in Slovakia to receive the European Research Council grant.

Tkáč got his PhD in Chemistry in 2000 at the Slovak University of Technology in Bratislava. Following his graduation, he shortly worked at the Slovak Academy of Sciences and then abroad at Linköping University (2001-2003), Lund University (2003-2006, supported by the Marie Curie Individual Fellowship) and at Oxford (2006-2008). In 2012, he returned to the Slovak Academy of Sciences with a European Research Council grant.

Tkáč's research focuses on the research of glycans for the diagnosis of some oncological diseases.

In 2018, he received European Research Council Proof of Concept grant with his new start up Glycanostics.
