= Antonín Plachý =

Czech footballer (born 1971)

Personal information
- Date of birth: 9 January 1971 (age 55)
- Place of birth: Czechoslovakia
- Position: Defender

Senior career*
Years	Team	Apps	(Gls)
1995–1997	AC Sparta Prague	10	(0)
2000–2001	Sparta Krc		
2002	Toronto Lynx	3	(0)
2002	Toronto Supra	9	(0)
- * Club domestic league appearances and goals

Antonín Plachý (born January 9, 1971) is a former Czech footballer who had stints in the Czech First League, USL A-League, and the Canadian Professional Soccer League.

== Playing career ==
Plachý began his career in 1995 with Czech giants AC Sparta Prague of the Czech First League, and played two seasons with Sparta Krc. On July 26, 2002 the Toronto Lynx of the USL A-League announced the signing of Plachý. He made his debut for the club on July 26, 2002 in a match against the Hampton Roads Mariners. At the conclusion of the USL A-League season, Plachý signed with Toronto Supra of the Canadian Professional Soccer League. He made his debut on September 6, 2002 in a match against York Region Shooters. He appeared in nine matches with Supra, but failed to reach the postseason by finishing last in the Eastern Conference.
