= Michael (footballer, born 1999) =

Brazilian footballer

Personal information
- Full name: Michael Rangel dos Santos de Almeida
- Date of birth: 27 May 1999 (age 27)
- Place of birth: Rio de Janeiro, Brazil
- Height: 1.75 m (5 ft 9 in)
- Position: Defender

Team information
- Current team: Bnei Yehuda
- Number: 59

Youth career
- –2019: Flamengo

Senior career*
Years	Team	Apps	(Gls)
2020–	Bnei Yehuda	3	(0)

International career^{‡}
2017	Brazil U20	3	(0)
- * Club domestic league appearances and goals as of 22:05, 8 December 2020 (UTC) ‡ National team caps and goals as of 22:51, 8 December 2020 (UTC)

Michael Rangel dos Santos de Almeida (born 27 May 1999), commonly known as Michael, is a Brazilian footballer who currently plays as a defender for Bnei Yehuda.

== Career statistics ==
=== Club ===
As of 8 December 2020.

Club	Season	League			Cup		League Cup		Other		Total	
Club	Season	Division	Apps	Goals	Apps	Goals	Apps	Goals	Apps	Goals	Apps	Goals
Bnei Yehuda	2020–21	Ligat Ha`Al	3	0	0	0	0	0	0	0	3	0
Total			3	0	0	0	0	0	0	0	3	0
