= Reece James =

English footballer (born 1999)

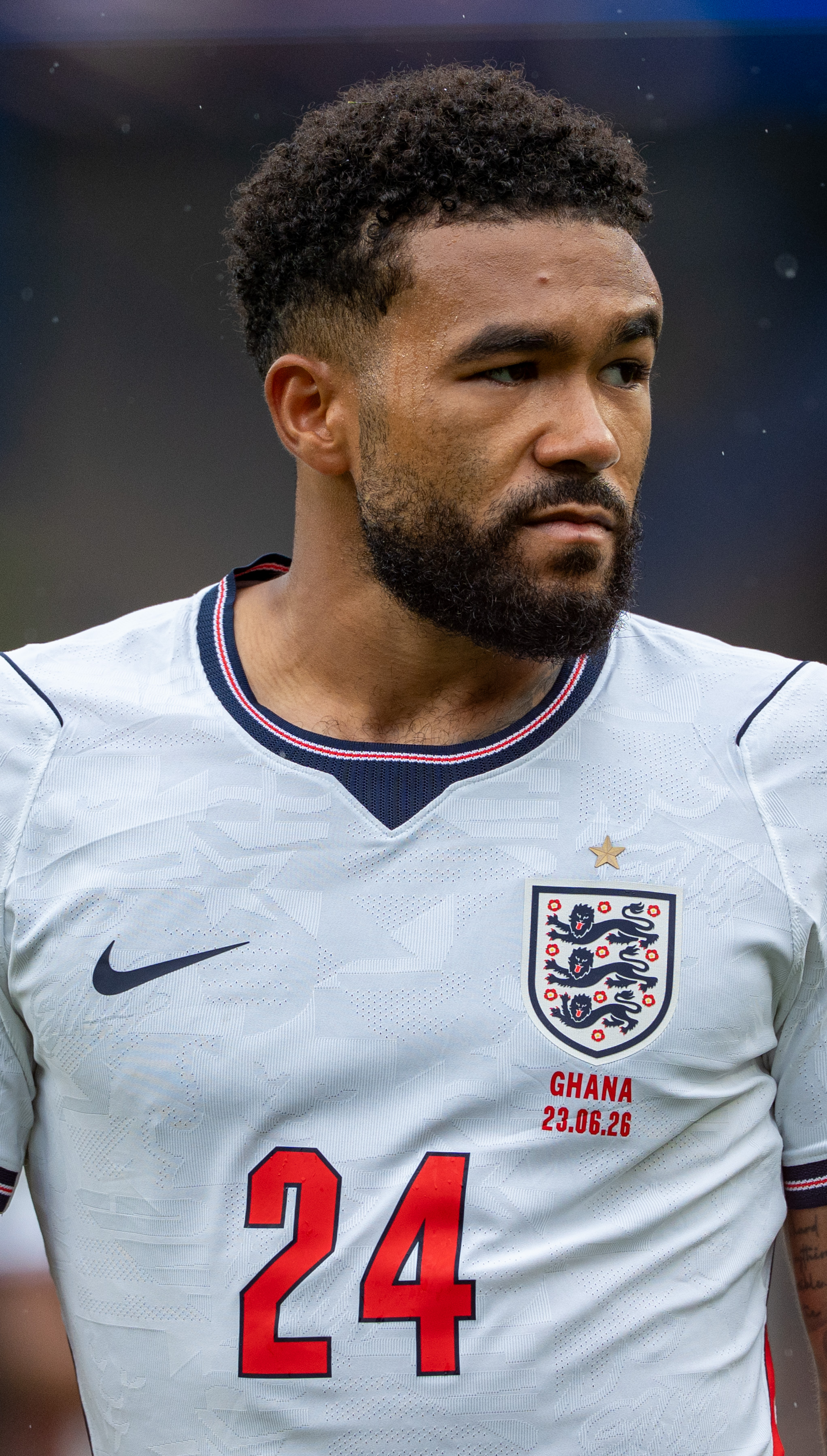
- James with England in 2026

Personal information
- Full name: Reece Lewis James
- Date of birth: 8 December 1999 (age 26)
- Place of birth: Redbridge, London, England
- Height: 5 ft 11 in (1.80 m)
- Positions: Right-back; midfielder

Team information
- Current team: Chelsea
- Number: 24

Youth career
- Kew Park Rangers
- –2006: Epsom Eagles
- 2006–2007: Chelsea
- 2007–2008: Fulham
- 2008–2018: Chelsea

Senior career*
| Years | Team | Apps | (Gls) |
| 2018– | Chelsea | 160 | (10) |
| 2018–2019 | → Wigan Athletic (loan) | 45 | (3) |

International career^{‡}
| 2017 | England U18 | 3 | (0) |
| 2017–2018 | England U19 | 7 | (0) |
| 2017–2019 | England U20 | 12 | (0) |
| 2019 | England U21 | 2 | (0) |
| 2020– | England | 29 | (1) |
Medal record
Men's football
Representing England
FIFA World Cup
| Third place | 2026 Canada–Mexico–US |
UEFA European Championship
| Runner-up | 2020 Europe |
UEFA European Under-19 Championship
| Winner | 2017 Georgia |
- * Club domestic league appearances and goals as of 20:59, 12 September 2026 (UTC) ‡ National team caps and goals as of 23:05, 18 July 2026 (UTC)

Reece Lewis James (born 8 December 1999) is an English professional footballer who plays as a right-back and midfielder for Premier League club Chelsea, which he captains, and the England national team.

James joined the Chelsea academy as a youth and turned professional in 2017, a season where he captained the under-18s to victory in the FA Youth Cup and was named Academy Player of the Season. A productive loan spell with Wigan Athletic of the Championship saw him promoted to the Chelsea first team upon his return in 2019. He won the UEFA Champions League, UEFA Super Cup and FIFA Club World Cup with the club in 2021, and was appointed captain in 2023. He led Chelsea to victory at the UEFA Conference League and FIFA Club World Cup in 2025.

After representing England at various youth levels, James made his senior debut in 2020, and went on to appear at UEFA Euro 2020 and the 2026 FIFA World Cup.

== Early life ==
James was born in Redbridge, Greater London, growing up in Mortlake, and attending Isleworth and Syon School. He is from a family involved in football; his older brother played, his sister, Lauren, is also a professional footballer, and signed for Chelsea Women in July 2021, and their father Nigel is a football coach. James grew up as a Chelsea fan, with Didier Drogba his favourite player. James credits his father, and Chelsea youth team coaches Frank O'Brien, Joe Edwards, and Jody Morris as having had a major influence on his career. Reece and Lauren are the first brother and sister to represent England at senior level in the modern era.

He is of Grenadian and Dominican descent through his father, and English descent through his mother.

== Club career ==
=== Early career ===
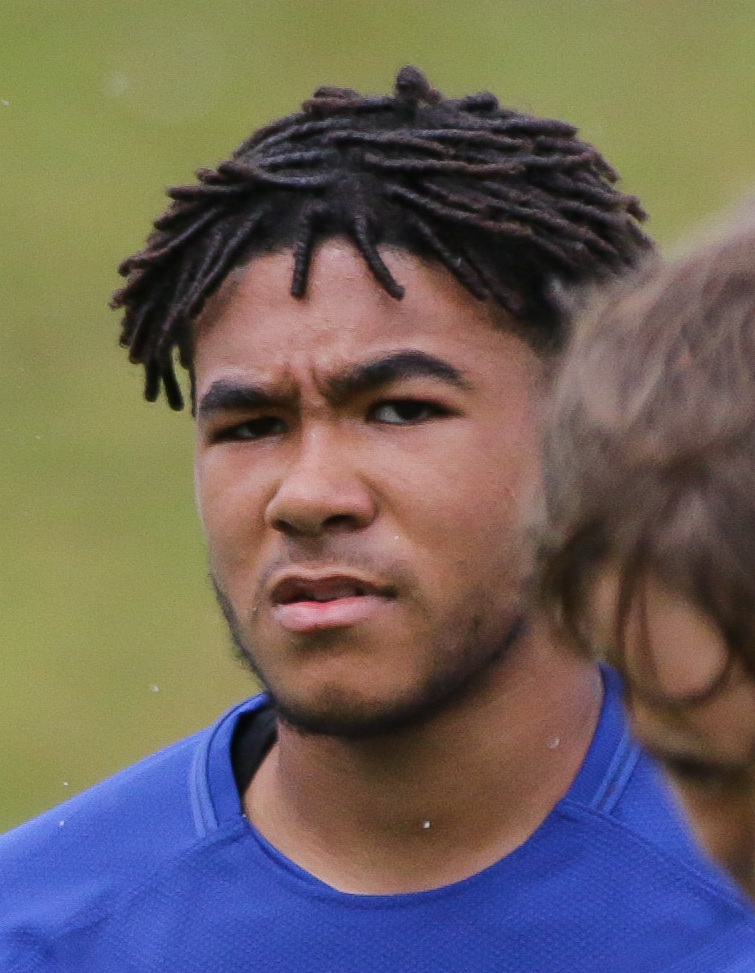
James playing for Chelsea in 2017

Starting his grassroots playing career at Kew Park Rangers and Epsom Eagles, James signed with Chelsea at the age of six, and had a short spell at West London rivals Fulham when he was seven. He played as a striker idolizing Didier Drogba in his early teens, but was moved to the midfield, and later to a right-back position where he struggled at first. He turned professional with Chelsea in March 2017. During the 2017–18 season he captained the under-18s to win the FA Youth Cup and was named Academy Player of the Season. He signed a new four-year contract with the club in June 2018.

In June 2018, James joined Championship club Wigan Athletic on loan for the 2018–19 season. He made his first-team debut on 4 August, starting in Wigan's first game of the season, helping his side to a 3–2 home victory over Sheffield Wednesday. He scored his first goal for Wigan on 4 November, scoring the first goal with a free kick in the sixth minute of a 2–1 home loss to Leeds United. In March 2019, he was selected to the 2018–19 Championship Team of the Season. He won three awards at Wigan Athletic's end of season awards, including Player of the Year.

=== 2019–2021: First-team breakthrough and UEFA Champions League title ===
On 25 September 2019, James made his debut for Chelsea after returning from injury. He scored his first goal and assisted two in a 7–1 win over Grimsby Town in the third round of the 2019–20 EFL Cup. James became Chelsea's youngest ever goalscorer in the UEFA Champions League when he scored the fourth goal of their 4–4 comeback draw with Ajax on 5 November. He signed a long-term contract extension with Chelsea on 16 January 2020.

On 14 September 2020, James scored his first Premier League goal, in a 3–1 win for Chelsea against Brighton & Hove Albion. On 5 December, James made his 50th appearance for Chelsea in all competitions in the club's 3–1 league win over Leeds United.

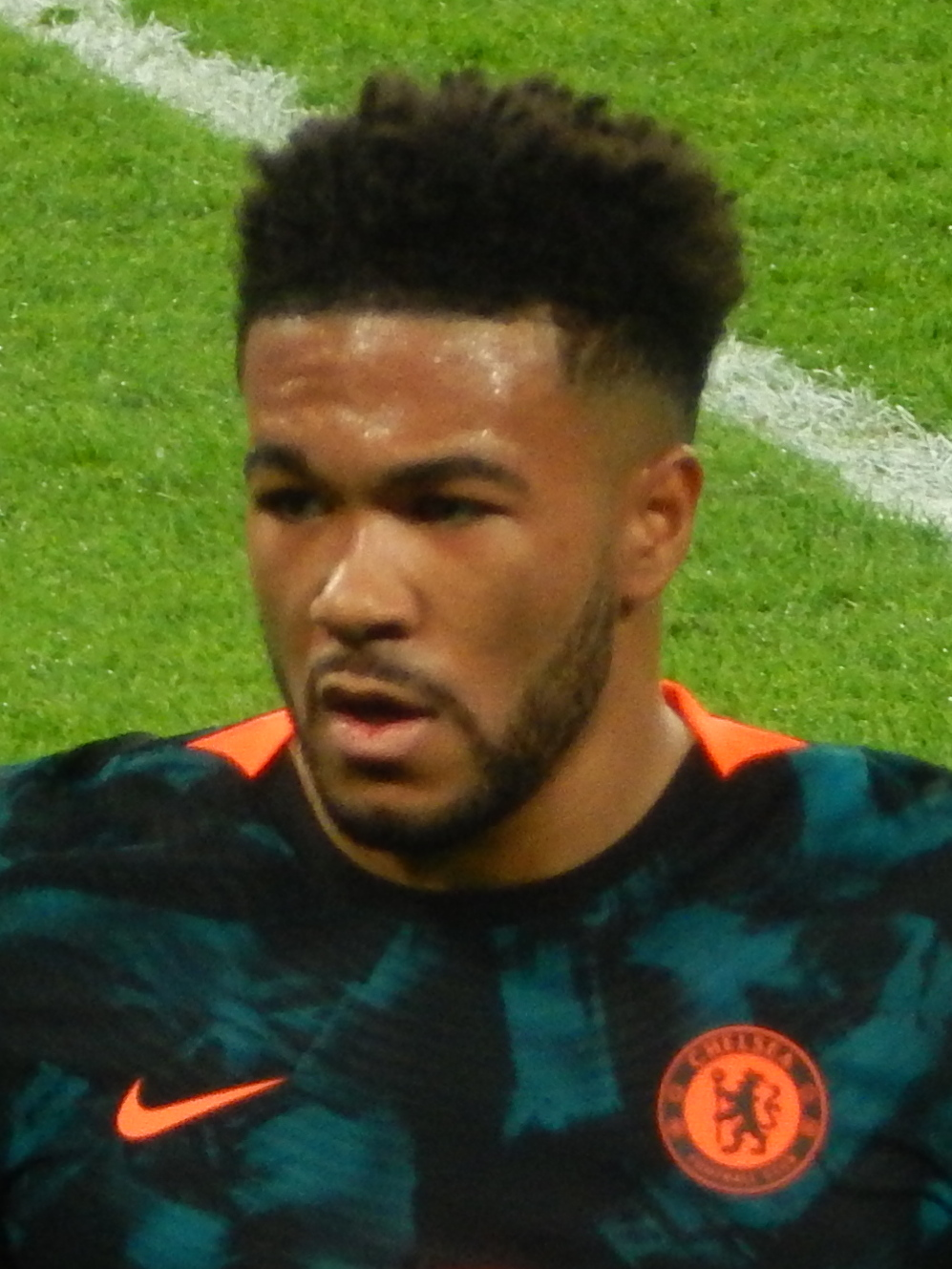
James playing for Chelsea in 2021

In January 2021, James was subject to racist abuse online. In March, he deleted his Instagram account in response to the abuse he received. On 29 May, James won his first-ever Champions League as Chelsea won 1–0 against Manchester City in the final in Porto.

=== 2021–2023: Injury issues ===
On 28 August 2021, James was sent off at the end of the first half of a 1–1 draw against Liverpool due to a handball incident. He scored two goals in the second half of a 3–0 win over Newcastle United at St James' Park on 30 October. At the end of the season James was nominated for the PFA Young Player of the Year award.

On 5 September 2022, James signed a new six-year contract with Chelsea, committing to the club until June 2028. His performances were praised in October 2022, although later that month he suffered a knee injury, and had to see a specialist doctor. He was injured on his first game back, on 27 December 2022, being substituted after 53 minutes. He was ruled out of play for a further four weeks. On 25 April 2023, Chelsea announced that James would miss the rest of the season with a hamstring problem.

=== 2023–present: Assuming the captaincy and further injuries ===
Following the departure of César Azpilicueta, James was named club captain of Chelsea on 9 August 2023. He suffered a hamstring injury early in the season, which re-occurred in November 2023 after he returned to play. In late December 2023, he had surgery to fix the recurring hamstring injury. James returned on 11 May 2024 as a substitute against Nottingham Forest, providing the game-winning assist to Nicolas Jackson in the 3–2 victory at City Ground.

On 11 May 2024, James was shown a red card for violent conduct in a 2–1 win at Brighton & Hove Albion, meaning he would miss the final fixture of the 2023–24 season and the first three matches of the 2024–25 season.

James began the 2024–25 season with a number of injuries. After returning to play in October 2024, James was criticised by Chelsea manager Enzo Maresca for a lack of effort. He suffered a further hamstring injury in November 2024.

On 11 January 2025, James returned to the Chelsea team for the FA Cup third round tie with Morecambe, playing the first half of the 5–0 win. Three days later, he scored a 95th minute equaliser from a free kick after appearing as a 56th-minute substitute in a 2–2 draw with Bournemouth. This was James' first Premier League goal since August 2022, when he scored in a 2–2 draw with Tottenham Hotspur. James said his time injured had been "lonely and frustrating".

On 28 May 2025, James lifted his first trophy as Chelsea captain after coming on as a half-time substitute in the 2025 UEFA Conference League final victory against Real Betis. The following month, he captained Chelsea at the 2025 FIFA Club World Cup, a tournament they went on to win by beating Paris Saint-Germain 3–0 in the final on 13 July.

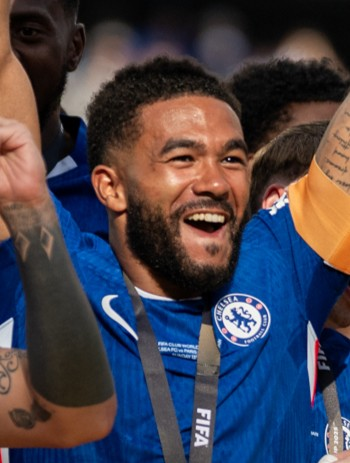
James in 2025

The next season, James improved on his injury record and was often deployed as a midfielder under Enzo Maresca. On 18 October 2025, he scored his first goal of the Premier League season against Nottingham Forest, while also registering an assist. He backed this up with another goal, this time from a free kick, against Newcastle United on 20 December. On 13 March 2026, James extended his contract with Chelsea to 2032. On 10 October 2026, James suffered a knee injury while training before Chelsea's 5–1 win over Bournemouth. He had a knee surgery and was ruled out of play for three months.

== International career ==
=== Youth ===
James has represented England at youth level from under-18 up to under-21. In May 2017, James was included in the under-20 squad for the 2017 Toulon Tournament. He started in the final as England beat the Ivory Coast to retain their title. In July, James was part of the under-19 squad that won the 2017 UEFA European Under-19 Championship. He started in the semi-final against the Czech Republic.

James was a member of the under-20 squad that travelled to the 2019 Toulon Tournament and was carried off on a stretcher with ankle ligament damage during the first half of the final group game defeat to Chile on 7 June 2019. On 4 October, James was included in the under-21 squad for the first time. He made his under-21 debut during the 3–0 2021 UEFA European Under-21 Championship qualification victory away to Albania on 15 November.

=== Senior ===
On 5 October 2020, James was called up for the first time to the senior team by manager Gareth Southgate following an injury to Raheem Sterling. He made his debut on 8 October at Wembley Stadium, coming on as a 58th-minute substitute for Kieran Trippier in a 3–0 friendly win over Wales. His first start came in a 1–0 loss to Denmark in the UEFA Nations League, where he was sent off for dissent after the final whistle.

In June 2021, James was named in England's 26-man squad for the postponed UEFA Euro 2020. He made one appearance at the tournament, playing the full match against Scotland in a 0–0 draw during the group stage.

James made three appearances for England during the 2022 FIFA World Cup qualifying campaign and five appearances in the 2022–23 UEFA Nations League. However, he was ruled out of the 2022 FIFA World Cup with a knee injury in November 2022. He later stated he was "devastated" to be excluded from the England squad.

In March 2023, James returned to the England squad for UEFA Euro 2024 qualifiers against Italy and Ukraine. After making a five-minute substitute appearance in the 2–1 win in Italy on 23 March, James withdrew from the squad due to a hamstring issue.

After a two-year absence, James returned to the England squad for 2026 FIFA World Cup qualification matches against Albania and Latvia. He appeared as a stoppage-time substitute in the match against Albania on 21 March, before starting at right back and scoring his first senior international goal against Latvia three days later.

James was called up again for October matches against Wales and Latvia, but later withdrew due to injury and was replaced by Nico O'Reilly.

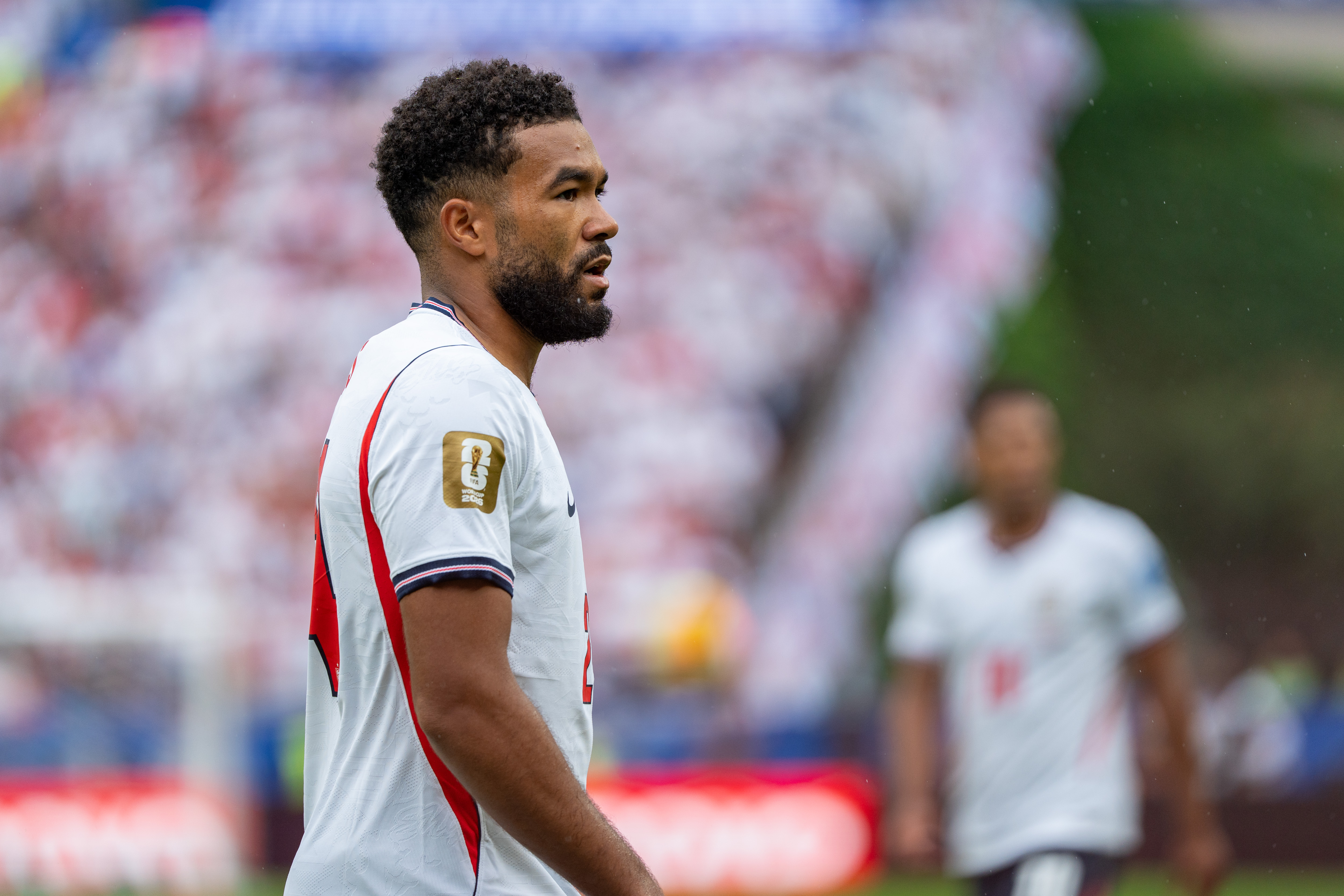
James with England at the 2026 FIFA World Cup

On 22 May 2026, James was selected in the 26-man squad for the 2026 FIFA World Cup, suffering an injury in the group stage. He was expected to return for the quarter-finals game against Norway.

== Style of play ==
James began playing as a striker, moving to become a winger, then a midfielder, before becoming a right back. His former manager at Chelsea, Thomas Tuchel, described him as "strong and influential". For part of his career he had a wing-back partnership with Ben Chilwell at both club and international level.

He began to be used in midfield occasionally at Chelsea firstly under Enzo Maresca, who always saw him as a midfielder when deciding to take the job. James was also used as a midfielder by Maresca's successor Xabi Alonso, who "said he believes James can become one of the best midfielders in the world".

== Personal life ==
In August 2020, James made a personal donation and posted a link on his social media accounts to a Crowdfunder site which was looking to boost Wigan's funds in a bid to help save his former loan club. He wrote in the post 'Come on let's help @laticsofficial out' in a bid to encourage others to follow.

In January 2021, Marcus Rashford praised James, along with his teammate Mason Mount, for their "amazing" charitable work. James had spent the past 18 months volunteering with a London-based charity, The Felix Project.

James is a fan of fashion shows, and is friends with F1 driver Lewis Hamilton.

== Career statistics ==
=== Club ===
As of match played 12 September 2026

Appearances and goals by club, season and competition
| Club | Season | League | | | FA Cup | | EFL Cup | | Europe | | Other | | Total | |
| Club | Season | Division | Apps | Goals | Apps | Goals | Apps | Goals | Apps | Goals | Apps | Goals | Apps | Goals |
|---|---|---|---|---|---|---|---|---|---|---|---|---|---|---|
| Chelsea U23/U21 | 2016–17 | — | | | — | | — | | — | | 1 (Note: Appearance(s) in EFL Trophy) | 0 | 1 | 0 |
| Chelsea U23/U21 | 2017–18 | — | | | — | | — | | — | | 6 | 1 | 6 | 1 |
| Chelsea U23/U21 | Total | | — | | — | | — | | — | | 7 | 1 | 7 | 1 |
| Chelsea | 2018–19 | Premier League | 0 | 0 | — | | — | | 0 | 0 | — | | 0 | 0 |
| Chelsea | 2019–20 | Premier League | 24 | 0 | 5 | 0 | 2 | 1 | 6 (Note: Appearances in UEFA Champions League) | 1 | 0 | 0 | 37 | 2 |
| Chelsea | 2020–21 | Premier League | 32 | 1 | 5 | 0 | 0 | 0 | 10 | 0 | — | | 47 | 1 |
| Chelsea | 2021–22 | Premier League | 26 | 5 | 3 | 0 | 4 | 0 | 6 | 1 | 0 | 0 | 39 | 6 |
| Chelsea | 2022–23 | Premier League | 16 | 1 | 0 | 0 | 0 | 0 | 8 | 1 | — | | 24 | 2 |
| Chelsea | 2023–24 | Premier League | 10 | 0 | 0 | 0 | 1 | 0 | — | | — | | 11 | 0 |
| Chelsea | 2024–25 | Premier League | 19 | 1 | 1 | 0 | 0 | 0 | 7 (Note: Appearances in UEFA Conference League) | 1 | 5 (Note: Appearances in FIFA Club World Cup) | 1 | 32 | 3 |
| Chelsea | 2025–26 | Premier League | 29 | 2 | 2 | 0 | 0 | 0 | 8 | 0 | — | | 39 | 2 |
| Chelsea | 2026–27 | Premier League | 4 | 0 | 0 | 0 | 2 | 0 | — | | — | | 6 | 0 |
| Chelsea | Total | | 160 | 10 | 16 | 0 | 9 | 1 | 45 | 4 | 5 | 1 | 235 | 16 |
| Wigan Athletic (loan) | 2018–19 | Championship | 45 | 3 | 1 | 0 | 0 | 0 | — | | — | | 46 | 3 |
| Career total | | | 205 | 13 | 17 | 0 | 9 | 1 | 45 | 4 | 12 | 2 | 288 | 20 |

=== International ===
As of match played 18 July 2026

Appearances and goals by national team and year
| National team | Year | Apps | Goals |
|---|---|---|---|
| England | 2020 | 4 | 0 |
| England | 2021 | 6 | 0 |
| England | 2022 | 5 | 0 |
| England | 2023 | 1 | 0 |
| England | 2024 | 0 | 0 |
| England | 2025 | 6 | 1 |
| England | 2026 | 7 | 0 |
| Total | | 29 | 1 |

As of match played 13 November 2025
England score listed first, score column indicates score after each James goal

List of international goals scored by Reece James
| No. | Date | Venue | Cap | Opponent | Score | Result | Competition | Ref. |
|---|---|---|---|---|---|---|---|---|
| 1 | 24 March 2025 | Wembley Stadium, London, England | 18 | Latvia | 1–0 | 3–0 | 2026 FIFA World Cup qualification | |

== Honours ==
Chelsea U18

- U18 Premier League: 2016–17, 2017–18
- FA Youth Cup: 2016–17, 2017–18

Chelsea

- UEFA Champions League: 2020–21
- UEFA Conference League: 2024–25
- UEFA Super Cup: 2021
- FIFA Club World Cup: 2021, 2025
- FA Cup runner-up: 2019–20, 2020–21, 2021–22, 2025–26
- EFL Cup runner-up: 2021–22

England U19

- UEFA European Under-19 Championship: 2017

England U20

- Toulon Tournament: 2017

England

- UEFA European Championship runner-up: 2020
- FIFA World Cup third place: 2026

Individual

- Toulon Tournament Best XI: 2017
- Chelsea Academy Player of the Year: 2017–18
- Wigan Athletic Player of the Year: 2018–19
- Wigan Athletic Player's Player of the Year: 2018–19
- Wigan Athletic Goal of the Season: 2018–19
- FA Cup Team of the Year: 2020–21
- PFA Community Champion Award: 2020–21
