= Roman Kašiar =

Czech footballer

Personal information
- Date of birth: 27 January 1998 (age 28)
- Place of birth: Ludwigsburg, Germany
- Height: 1.87 m (6 ft 2 in)
- Position: Forward

Team information
- Current team: FSV 08 Bissingen
- Number: 31

Youth career
- 2006–2009: SpVgg Ludwigsburg
- 2009–2012: Stuttgart
- –2017: Stuttgarter Kickers

Senior career*
Years	Team	Apps	(Gls)
2017–2018	Stuttgarter Kickers	9	(0)
2018–2019	Pardubice	8	(1)
2019	Budissa Bautzen	15	(3)
2019	Meuselwitz	3	(0)
2019–2020	Aalen	4	(0)
2020–	FSV 08 Bissingen	3	(1)

International career
2016–2017	Czech Republic U19	5	(0)
- * Club domestic league appearances and goals as of 14:37, 9 November 2020 (UTC)

Roman Kašiar (born 27 January 1998) is a professional footballer who plays as a forward for FSV 08 Bissingen. Born in Germany, Kašiar has represented the Czech Republic at youth international level.

== Career statistics ==
As of 24 September 2020

Club	Season	League			Cup		Continental		Other		Total	
Club	Season	Division	Apps	Goals	Apps	Goals	Apps	Goals	Apps	Goals	Apps	Goals
Stuttgarter Kickers	2017–18	Regionalliga	9	0	0	0	–		2 (Note: Appearances in the Württemberg Cup)	0	11	0
Pardubice	2017–18	Fortuna národní liga	4	1	0	0	–		0	0	4	1
Pardubice	2018–19	Fortuna národní liga	4	0	1 (Note: Appearances in the Czech Cup)	0	–		0	0	5	0
Pardubice	Total		8	1	1	0	0	0	0	0	9	1
Budissa Bautzen	2018–19	Regionalliga	15	3	0	0	–		0	0	15	3
Meuselwitz	2019–20	Regionalliga	3	0	0	0	–		1 (Note: Appearances in the Thuringian Cup)	0	4	0
Aalen	2019–20	Regionalliga	4	0	0	0	–		1	0	5	0
Career total			39	4	1	0	0	0	4	0	44	4
