= Jan Plachý =

Czech footballer

Personal information
- Date of birth: 7 May 1998 (age 28)
- Height: 1.95 m (6 ft 5 in)
- Position: Goalkeeper

Team information
- Current team: Teplice

Youth career
- –2017: Teplice

Senior career*
Years	Team	Apps	(Gls)
2017–	Teplice	0	(0)
2017–2018	→ Litoměřicko (loan)	42	(0)
2019–2020	→ Ústí nad Labem (loan)	5	(0)

International career^{‡}
2016	Czech Republic U19	2	(0)
- * Club domestic league appearances and goals as of 18:44, 24 September 2020 (UTC) ‡ National team caps and goals as of 18:44, 24 September 2020 (UTC)

Jan Plachý (born 7 May 1998) is a Czech footballer who currently plays as a goalkeeper for Teplice.

== Career statistics ==
=== Club ===
As of 24 September 2020.

Club	Season	League			Cup		Continental		Other		Total	
Club	Season	Division	Apps	Goals	Apps	Goals	Apps	Goals	Apps	Goals	Apps	Goals
Teplice	2017–18	Fortuna liga	0	0	0	0	–		0	0	0	0
Teplice	2018–19	Fortuna liga	0	0	0	0	–		0	0	0	0
Teplice	2019–20	Fortuna liga	0	0	0	0	–		0	0	0	0
Teplice	2020–21	Fortuna liga	0	0	0	0	–		0	0	0	0
Teplice	Total		0	0	0	0	0	0	0	0	0	0
Litoměřicko (loan)	2017–18	ČFL	33	0	0	0	–		0	0	33	0
Litoměřicko (loan)	2018–19	ČFL	9	0	1 (Note: Appearances in the Czech Cup)	0	–		0	0	10	0
Litoměřicko (loan)	Total		42	0	1	0	0	0	0	0	43	0
Ústí nad Labem (loan)	2019–20	Fortuna národní liga	5	0	0	0	–		0	0	5	0
Career total			47	0	1	0	0	0	0	0	48	0
