= Pavel Tkáč =

Czech footballer (born 1998)

Personal information
- Date of birth: 15 June 1998 (age 28)
- Height: 1.81 m (5 ft 11 in)
- Position: Defender

Team information
- Current team: Slovácko

Youth career
- –2017: Slovácko

Senior career*
Years	Team	Apps	(Gls)
2017–	Slovácko	1	(0)
2018	→ Vítkovice (loan)	4	(0)

International career^{‡}
2016	Czech Republic U19	4	(0)
- * Club domestic league appearances and goals as of 18:44, 24 September 2020 (UTC) ‡ National team caps and goals as of 18:44, 24 September 2020 (UTC)

Pavel Tkáč (born 15 June 1998) is a Czech footballer who currently plays as a defender for Slovácko.

== Career statistics ==
=== Club ===
As of 24 September 2020.

Club	Season	League			Cup		Continental		Other		Total	
Club	Season	Division	Apps	Goals	Apps	Goals	Apps	Goals	Apps	Goals	Apps	Goals
Slovácko	2017–18	Fortuna liga	1	0	1 (Note: Appearances in the Czech Cup)	0	–		0	0	2	0
Slovácko	2018–19	Fortuna liga	0	0	0	0	–		0	0	0	0
Slovácko	2019–20	Fortuna liga	0	0	0	0	–		0	0	0	0
Slovácko	2020–21	Fortuna liga	0	0	0	0	–		0	0	0	0
Slovácko	Total		1	0	1	0	0	0	0	0	2	0
Vítkovice (loan)	2017–18	Fortuna národní liga	4	0	0	0	–		0	0	4	0
Career total			5	0	1	0	0	0	0	0	6	0
