= Scottish Premier League Yearly Awards =

Yearly awards were made by the Scottish Premier League (SPL) until the league ceased operating in 2013. The awards were presented by SPL sponsors Bank of Scotland up to season 2006–07 and then Clydesdale Bank from season 2007–08 to 2012–13.

== Winners ==
Season	Manager of the Year		Player of the Year		Young Player of the Year		Ref
Season	Winner	Club	Winner	Club	Winner	Club	Ref
2002–03	Alex McLeish	Rangers	Barry Ferguson	Rangers	Zurab Khizanishvili	Dundee	
2003–04	Martin O'Neill	Celtic	Chris Sutton	Celtic	Craig Gordon	Heart of Midlothian	
2004–05	Tony Mowbray	Hibernian	Dado Pršo	Rangers	Derek Riordan	Hibernian	
2005–06			Paul Hartley	Heart of Midlothian	Steven Naismith	Kilmarnock	
2006–07	Gordon Strachan	Celtic	Shunsuke Nakamura	Celtic	Steven Naismith	Kilmarnock	
2007–08	Walter Smith	Rangers	Carlos Cuéllar	Rangers	Aiden McGeady	Celtic	
2008–09	Csaba László	Heart of Midlothian	Gary Caldwell	Celtic	Steven Fletcher	Hibernian	
2009–10	Walter Smith	Rangers	David Weir	Rangers	David Goodwillie	Dundee United	
2010–11	Mixu Paatelainen	Kilmarnock	Emilio Izaguirre	Celtic	David Goodwillie	Dundee United	
2011–12	Neil Lennon	Celtic	Charlie Mulgrew	Celtic	James Forrest	Celtic	
2012–13	Stuart McCall	Motherwell	Leigh Griffiths	Hibernian	Victor Wanyama	Celtic	

Season	U19 / U20 Player of the Year		Goal of the Season		Save of the Season		Ref
Season	Winner	Club	Winner	Club	Winner	Club	Ref
2007–08	Scott Anson	Kilmarnock	Willo Flood	Dundee United	no award		
2008–09	Sean Welsh	Hibernian	Marc Crosas	Celtic	Graeme Smith	Motherwell	
2009–10	Dale Hilson	Dundee United	Anthony Stokes	Hibernian	Artur Boruc	Celtic	
2010–11	Jason Holt	Heart of Midlothian	Derek Riordan	Hibernian	Marian Kello	Heart of Midlothian	
2011–12	Paul George	Celtic	James Dayton	Kilmarnock	Allan McGregor	Rangers	
2012–13	Chris Johnston	Kilmarnock	Graham Carey	St Mirren	Fraser Forster	Celtic	

Season	Best Club Media Relations	Best Community Initiative	Best Matchday Hospitality	Best Fan Initiative	Best Away Ground	SPL Family Champions	Ref
2007–08	Kilmarnock	Falkirk	Rangers	Heart of Midlothian	Tynecastle (Hearts)	no award	
2008–09	Motherwell	Motherwell	no award			no award	
2009–10	Motherwell	Hibernian	no award			St Mirren	
2010–11	Motherwell	St Mirren	no award			Rangers	
2011–12	Motherwell	St Mirren	no award			St Mirren	
2012–13	Motherwell	Dundee United	no award			St Johnstone	

== See also ==
- List of Scottish Premier League monthly award winners
- Scottish Football League Yearly Awards
- Scottish Premier League Golden Boot
- Scottish Professional Football League yearly awards
