= Scottish Premier League Golden Boot =

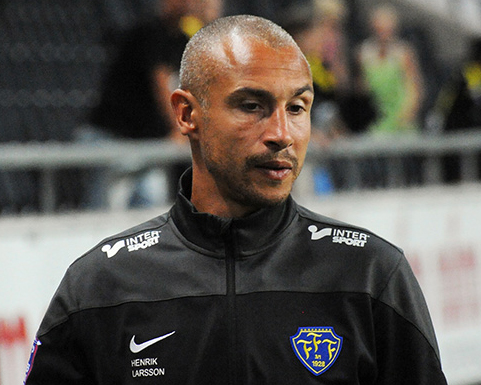
- Henrik Larsson won the most Golden Boots (5)
- Awarded for: The leading goalscorer in a given SPL season.
- Sponsored by: Clydesdale Bank
- Country: Scotland
- Presented by: Scottish Premier League
- First award: 1999
- Final award: 2013

Highlights
- Most awards: Henrik Larsson (5)

The Scottish Premier League Golden Boot was a football award presented to the leading goalscorer at every end of season of the Scottish Premier League (SPL). The Scottish Premier League (SPL) replaced the Scottish Premier Division as the top flight of Scottish football for the 1998–99 season, but was replaced by the Scottish Premiership as the top division by the end of the 2012–13 season, after the merger of the Scottish Premier League (SPL) and Scottish Football League (SFL) to form the Scottish Professional Football League (SPFL).

== Winners ==
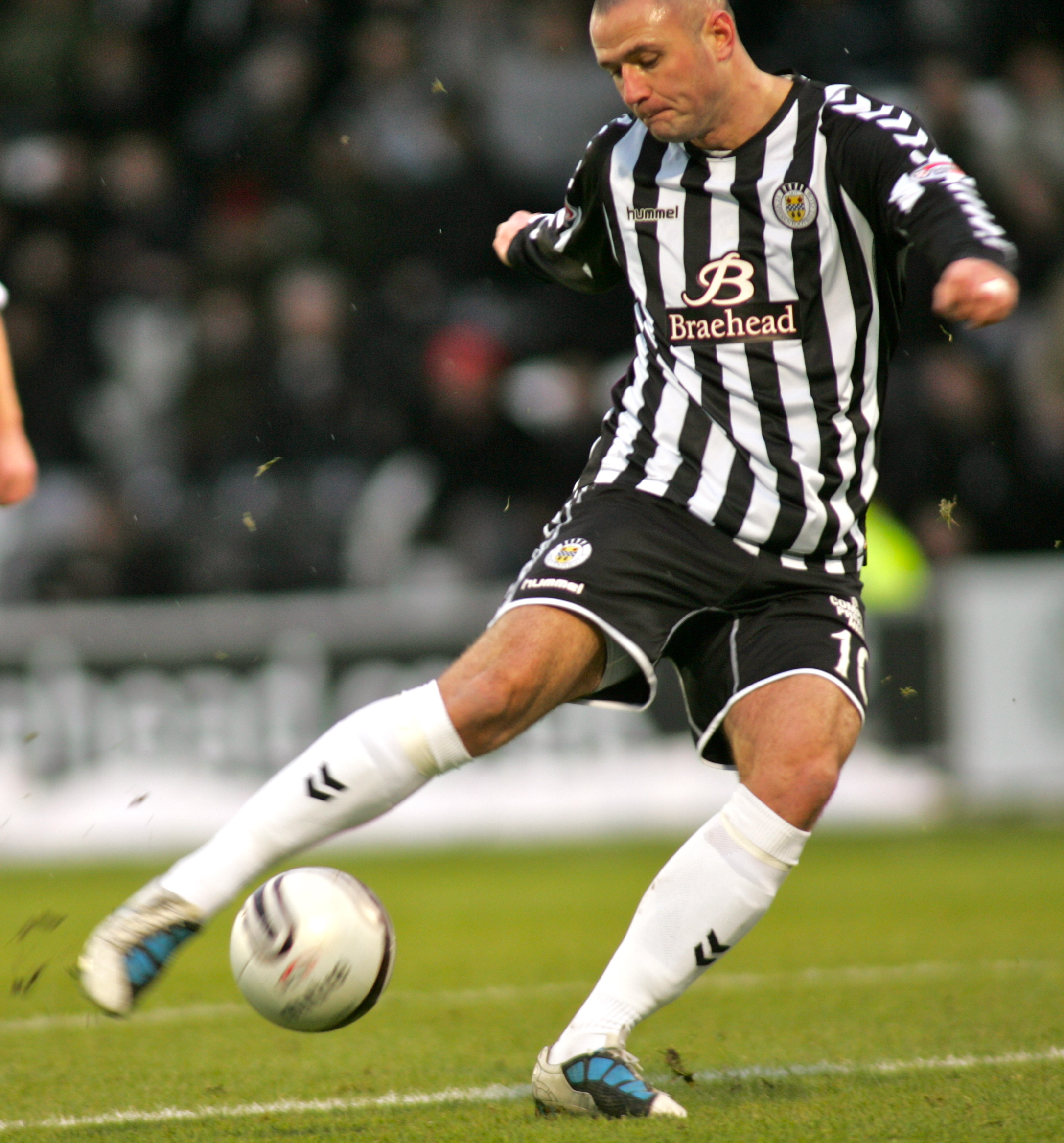
Michael Higdon was the last winner of the Scottish Premier League Golden Boot in 2013.

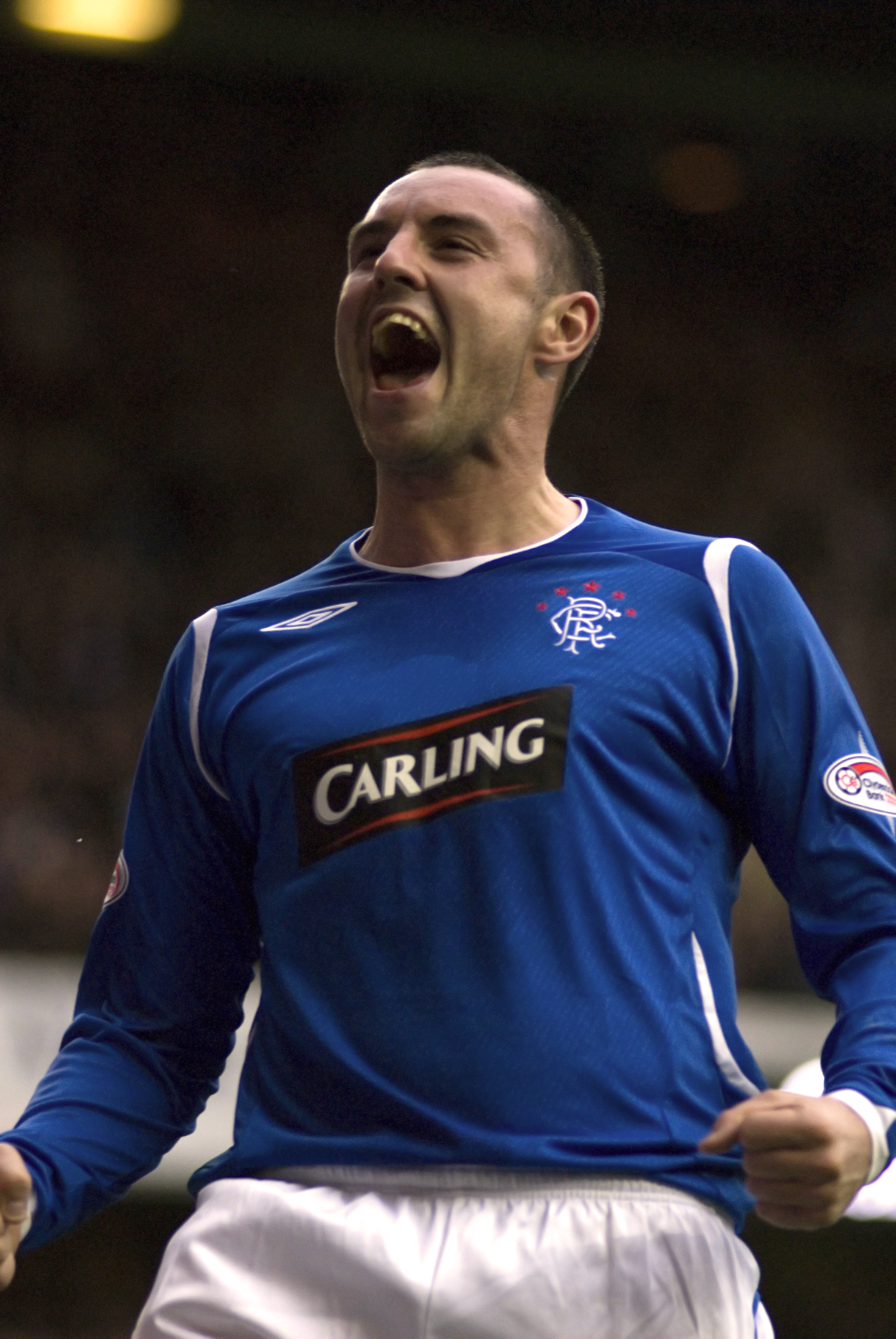
Kris Boyd was the only winner of the Scottish Premier League Golden Boot representing two clubs in one season.

Key
Player (X)	Name of the player and number of times they had won the award at that point (if more than one)
Games	The number of SPL season league games played by the winner that season (Note: This does not necessarily match the total number of games in a season.)
Rate	The winner's goals-to-games ratio that regular season
†	Indicates multiple award winners in the same season
§	Denotes the club were SPL champions in the same season

Scottish Premier League Golden Boot winners
Season	Player	Nationality	Club	Goals	Games	Rate	Ref(s)
1998–99	Henrik Larsson	Sweden	Celtic	29	35	0.83	
1999–2000	Mark Viduka	Australia	Celtic	25	28	0.89	
2000–01	Henrik Larsson (2)	Sweden	Celtic^{§}	35	37	0.95	
2001–02	Henrik Larsson (3)	Sweden	Celtic^{§}	29	33	0.88	
2002–03	Henrik Larsson (4)	Sweden	Celtic	28	35	0.80	
2003–04	Henrik Larsson (5)	Sweden	Celtic^{§}	30	37	0.81	
2004–05	John Hartson	Wales	Celtic	25	38	0.66	
2005–06	Kris Boyd	Scotland	Kilmarnock; Rangers	32	36	0.89	
2006–07	Kris Boyd (2)	Scotland	Rangers	20	32	0.63	
2007–08	Scott McDonald	Australia	Celtic^{§}	25	36	0.69	
2008–09	Kris Boyd (3)	Scotland	Rangers^{§}	27	35	0.77	
2009–10	Kris Boyd (4)	Scotland	Rangers^{§}	23	31	0.74	
2010–11	Kenny Miller	Scotland	Rangers^{§}	21	18	1.12	
2011–12	Gary Hooper	England	Celtic^{§}	24	37	0.65	
2012–13	Michael Higdon	England	Motherwell	26	37	0.70	

== Awards won by nationality ==
Country	Total
Scotland	5
Sweden	5
Australia	2
England	2
Wales	1

== Awards won by club ==
Club	Total
Celtic	9
Rangers	5
Kilmarnock	1
Motherwell	1

== See also ==
- Scottish Premier League Yearly Awards
- Scottish Professional Football League yearly awards § Goalscorers
