= Paul George (footballer) =

Irish footballer (born 1994)

Personal information
- Date of birth: 27 January 1994 (age 32)
- Place of birth: Killough, Northern Ireland
- Position: Midfielder

Youth career
- 2008–2011: Celtic

Senior career*
Years	Team	Apps	(Gls)
2011–2015	Celtic	3	(0)
2014	→ Hamilton Academical (loan)	17	(2)
2015	Dunfermline Athletic	8	(2)
2015–2016	Cliftonville	20	(2)
2016–2017	Ballarat Red Devils	12	(4)
2018	Portadown	6	(0)
- Dromara Village

International career
2009	Northern Ireland U16	6	(4)
2010	Northern Ireland U17	3	(1)
2011	Republic of Ireland U17	3	(2)
2011–2013	Republic of Ireland U19	3	(1)
- * Club domestic league appearances and goals

Paul George (born 27 January 1994) is an Irish former professional footballer.

George has previously played for Scottish sides Celtic, Hamilton, and Dunfermline Athletic. He has also represented both Northern Ireland and Republic of Ireland at youth levels.

== Career ==
George joined the Celtic youth squad in 2008 and made his senior debut on 21 September 2011 when he came on as a late substitute in a 2–0 League Cup victory over Ross County. He suffered a broken leg on 7 April 2012, following a challenge by a Rangers player in a U19 Old Firm match. Celtic initially announced that he could be out for between six and eight months following the injury. Despite the injury, George's performances over the course of the season saw him win the Under 19 League Player of the Season award.

After recovering from this injury, George joined Scottish Championship club Hamilton Academical on loan in January 2014 and made 17 appearances in total. He returned to Celtic at the end of the season but an injury in pre-season training saw George miss a substantial part of the start of the 2014–15 season. He made a handful of appearances for the Development Side before being released by Celtic in January 2015.

In February 2015, George appeared as a trialist for Dunfermline Athletic in a Fife Cup match against Cowdenbeath. After impressing manager John Potter with his performance, the Pars signed George until the end of the season. George was released at the end of the season, after making only 8 appearances for the side.

After having trials at Derry City and Glentoran, George signed for Cliftonville in October 2015. In June 2016, George signed for Australian side Ballarat Red Devils playing in the National Premier Leagues Victoria 2 West.

== International career ==
Killough born George started his international career with Northern Ireland, earning three under-17 caps. In 2011, he switched allegiance to the Republic of Ireland earning under-17 and under-19 caps.

== Career statistics ==
As of 26 September 2016

Club	Season	League		Cup		League Cup		Europe		Total	
Club	Season	Apps	Goals	Apps	Goals	Apps	Goals	Apps	Goals	Apps	Goals
Celtic	2011–12	0	0	0	0	1	0	0	0	1	0
Celtic	2012–13	0	0	0	0	0	0	0	0	0	0
Celtic	2013–14	3	0	0	0	0	0	0	0	0	0
Celtic	Total	0	0	0	0	1	0	0	0	1	0
Hamilton Academical (loan)	2013–14	14	2	0	0	0	0	0	0	6	0
Dunfermline Athletic	2014–15	8	2	0	0	0	0	0	0	4	0
Ballarat Red Devils	2016	7	2	0	0	0	0	0	0	7	2
Career Total		17	2	0	0	1	0	0	0	18	2

== Honours ==
Celtic

- Scottish Premier League Under 19 Player of the Year: 2011–12
