= 2013–14 Celtic F.C. season =

Celtic
2013–14 season
- Chairman: Ian Bankier
- Manager: Neil Lennon
- Ground: Celtic Park; Glasgow, Scotland (Capacity: 60,355)
- Scottish Premiership: 1st
- Scottish League Cup: Third round
- Champions League: Group stage
- Scottish Cup: Fifth round
- Top goalscorer: League: Kris Commons (27 goals); All: Kris Commons (32 goals)
Home colours	Away colours

The 2013–14 season was the 120th season of competitive football by Celtic. Celtic had a new shirt sponsor for the season with Irish Cider brand Magners taking over from Tennent's Lager for the next three years.

Celtic began the season with further Champions League success in their sights. They were faced with the burden of replacing three main pieces of their squad in; Gary Hooper and Kelvin Wilson were sold to Norwich City and Nottingham Forest respectively, whilst the highly rated Victor Wanyama was sold to Southampton for a Scottish record fee of £12.5 million. Neil Lennon rebuilt his squad by signing Virgil van Dijk and Amido Balde in the summer, and Teemu Pukki from Schalke 04 on transfer deadline day. Celtic were drawn with Cliftonville in their first qualifying round and easily disposed of the Northern Irish champions 5–0 on aggregate. They were next drawn with IF Elfsborg and squeezed by with a 1–0 aggregate win, with Kris Commons scoring the only goal in the first leg at Celtic Park. Although favoured to qualify for the group stages with minimal challenge after being drawn with Kazakh champions Shakhter Karagandy, Celtic found themselves losing the first leg in Karagandy 2–0. Celtic returned to Scotland to an electric atmosphere at Celtic Park in the home leg, in proved to be the high point of their 2013-14 Champions League campaign. They overcame the 2–0 deficit to level the aggregate thanks to goals by Kris Commons and Georgios Samaras. James Forrest completed the comeback for Celtic with a 90th-minute strike, sending Celtic Park into a frenzy.

Thereafter, Celtic found themselves drawn with AC Milan, Ajax and Barcelona (again) in the group stages. The campaign was dismal; winning only once with a 2–1 home win over Ajax, and slumping to a 6–1 rout away against Barcelona in the final group match. That game saw Celtic concede the most goals they had ever done in a single European tie, and equalled their previous heaviest defeat in Europe (5–0 against FC Artmedia Bratislava).

Celtic's 2014 domestic campaign was filled with ups and downs. Towards the end of February, Celtic had not lost a single game in the league, and drew just twice against Dundee United and Hibernian. Their league success did not translate to cup competition however; they bowed out of both the Scottish League Cup (0–1 to Morton), and the Scottish Cup(1–2 to Aberdeen), both at Celtic Park. Celtic also struggled to find a suitable strike partner for Anthony Stokes, forcing Kris Commons into a striking role. Neil Lennon signed former Hibs striker Leigh Griffiths on transfer deadline day in January 2014, as well as Stefan Johansen earlier in the month. After being unable to reach an agreement on a new contract, Joe Ledley left Celtic for Crystal Palace.

On 2 February 2014 goalkeeper Fraser Forster set a new a club-record of 11 league clean sheets in a row, surpassing a record of 10 clean sheets set by Charlie Shaw in the 1921–22 season. On 22 February, he broke Bobby Clark's Scottish League record of 1155 minutes without conceding a goal in a league match. Celtic won 2–0 away at Hearts, and Forster racked up his 13th consecutive clean sheet in the league. Forster's clean sheet run finally ended on 1,256 minutes against Aberdeen on 25 February 2014, as Aberdeen defeated Celtic 2–1 to end their unbeaten run in the league.

Celtic finished the season as league champions again, their third consecutive Scottish League title, scoring 102 goals in the process. Celtic clinched the title after a 5–1 away win against Partick Thistle on 26 March 2014. It is the earliest that the title has been won since the 1928–29 season, when Old Firm Rivals Rangers won it on 16 March.

Kris Commons was the top scorer in Scotland, netting 32 goals, and won both the PFA Scotland and Scottish Football Writers' Player of the Year awards.

== Competitions ==
Win Draw Loss Postponed

=== Pre-season and friendlies ===
3 July 2013 Friendly	Sevastopol	1–0	Celtic	TechnoMarkt-Stadion
	Iaroshenko 66'	Celtic Report		Attendance: 9,200

6 July 2013 Friendly	CFR Cluj	2–1	Celtic	Kufstein Arena
	Costea 9'; Kapetanos 65'	Celtic Report	Samaras 81'	Attendance: 7,000

9 July 2013 Friendly	Greuther Fürth	6–2	Celtic	Trolli Arena
	Djurdjic 10', 44' (pen.); Kraus 34'; Drexler 74'; Fall 84' (pen.), 88'	Celtic Report	Samaras 3'; Lustig 42'	Attendance: 12,000

12 July 2013 Friendly	FC Union Berlin	3–0	Celtic	Stadion An der Alten Försterei
	Terodde 11'; Brandy 55'; Kreilach 87'	Celtic Report		Attendance: 16,700

20 July 2013 Friendly	Brentford	1–2	Celtic	Griffin Park
	Forshaw 10'	Celtic Report	Baldé 23'; McGregor 57'	Attendance: 9,024

27 July 2013 Friendly	Celtic	1–2	Borussia Mönchengladbach	Celtic Park
	Stokes 75'	Celtic Report	Xhaka 37'; Hrgota 66'	Attendance: 15,000; Referee: Craig Thomson

10 August 2013 Friendly	Liverpool	0–1	Celtic	Aviva Stadium
		Celtic Report	Baldé 12'	Attendance: 51,000

9 January 2014 Friendly	Trabzonspor	1–3	Celtic	Akdeniz University Stadium
	Güral 41'	Celtic Report	Pukki 32'; Bamba 37' (o.g.); Baldé 57'

12 January 2014 Friendly	Celtic	0–0*	Galatasaray	Akdeniz University Stadium
		Celtic Report
Note: *Celtic lose the match 5 – 4 on penalties

=== Scottish Premiership ===
3 August 2013 Premiership	Celtic	2–1	Ross County	Celtic Park
	Stokes 28', 87'	BBC Sport	Maatsen 3'	Attendance: 45,705; Referee: Willie Collum

17 August 2013 Premiership	Aberdeen	0–2	Celtic	Pittodrie Stadium
		BBC Sport	Commons 45+1' (pen.); Forrest 87'	Attendance: 20,017; Referee: Calum Murray

24 August 2013 Premiership	Celtic	2–2	Inverness CT	Celtic Park
	Mulgrew 42'; Matthews 82'	BBC Sport	Doran 14'; Foran 35'	Attendance: 45,160; Referee: Craig Thomson

31 August 2013 Premiership	Dundee United	0–1	Celtic	Tannadice Park
		BBC Sport	Stokes 87'	Attendance: 10,586; Referee: Crawford Allan

14 September 2013 Premiership	Heart of Midlothian	1–3	Celtic	Tynecastle Stadium
	Holt 58'	BBC Sport	Commons 19' (pen.); Stokes 65'; Pukki 86'	Attendance: 15,928; Referee: Willie Collum

21 September 2013 Premiership	Celtic	2–1	St Johnstone	Celtic Park
	Pukki 11'; Mulgrew 26'	BBC Sport	Caddis 81'	Attendance: 45,220; Referee: Alan Muir

28 September 2013 Premiership	Kilmarnock	2–5	Celtic	Rugby Park
	Clingan 35'; Clohessy 42'	BBC Sport	Commons 20'; Samaras 24', 27', 88'; Baldé 90+1'	Attendance: 6,149; Referee: John Beaton

5 October 2013 Premiership	Celtic	2–0	Motherwell	Celtic Park
	Stokes 21'; Commons 49'	BBC Sport		Attendance: 46,608; Referee: Iain Brines

19 October 2013 Premiership	Hibernian	1–1	Celtic	Easter Road
	Heffernan 18'	BBC Sport	Forrest 77'	Attendance: 14,220; Referee: Calum Murray

27 October 2013 Premiership	Partick Thistle	1–2	Celtic	Firhill Stadium
	Doolan 67'	BBC Sport	Samaras 34'; Baldé 75'	Attendance: 7,978; Referee: Willie Collum

2 November 2013 Premiership	Celtic	1–1	Dundee United	Celtic Park
	Mulgrew 90+1'	BBC Sport	Armstrong 38'	Attendance: 47,386; Referee: Alan Muir

9 November 2013 Premiership	Ross County	1–4	Celtic	Global Energy Stadium
	Sproule 68'	BBC Sport	van Dijk 41', 53'; Ledley 70', 73'	Attendance: 5,982; Referee: Kevin Clancy

23 November 2013 Premiership	Celtic	3–1	Aberdeen	Celtic Park
	Commons 36', 90+3'; Boerrigter 90+1'	BBC Sport	McGinn 45'	Attendance: 49,683; Referee: Craig Thomson

6 December 2013 Premiership	Motherwell	0–5	Celtic	Fir Park
		BBC Sport	Commons 44', 76'; Ambrose 54'; Stokes 78'; Atajić 90'	Attendance: 9,117; Referee: Steven McLean

14 December 2013 Premiership	Celtic	1–0	Hibernian	Celtic Park
	Pukki 29'	BBC Sport		Attendance: 46,065; Referee: Bobby Madden

21 December 2013 Premiership	Celtic	2–0	Heart of Midlothian	Celtic Park
	Commons 64'; Forrest 90+3'	BBC Sport		Attendance: 46,058; Referee: Euan Norris

26 December 2013 Premiership	St Johnstone	0–1	Celtic	McDiarmid Park
		BBC Sport	van Dijk 4'	Attendance: 7,052; Referee: Craig Thomson

29 December 2013 Premiership	Inverness CT	0–1	Celtic	Caledonian Stadium
		BBC Sport	Commons 3'	Attendance: 6,384; Referee: Crawford Allan

1 January 2014 Premiership	Celtic	1–0	Partick Thistle	Celtic Park
	Ledley 39'	BBC Sport		Attendance: 52,670; Referee: Kevin Clancy

5 January 2014 Premiership	St Mirren	0–4	Celtic	St Mirren Park
		BBC Sport	Mulgrew 53'; Stokes 58'; Commons 70', 72'	Attendance: 5,778; Referee: John Beaton

18 January 2014 Premiership	Celtic	3–0	Motherwell	Celtic Park
	Commons 5', 39' (pen.); McManus 68' (o.g.)	BBC Sport		Attendance: 47,489; Referee: Bobby Madden

26 January 2014 Premiership	Hibernian	0–4	Celtic	Easter Road
		BBC Sport	Commons 9', 90' (pen.) van Dijk 77'; Pukki 83'	Attendance: 12,542; Referee: Craig Thomson

29 January 2014 Premiership	Celtic	4–0	Kilmarnock	Celtic Park
	Ledley 11'; Ashcroft 21' (o.g.); Mulgrew 68'; Baldé 90+1'	BBC Sport		Attendance: 44,271; Referee: Brian Colvin

2 February 2014 Premiership	Celtic	1–0	St Mirren	Celtic Park
	Commons 6'	BBC Sport		Attendance: 45,014; Referee: Alan Muir

16 February 2014 Premiership	Celtic	3–0	St Johnstone	Celtic Park
	Stokes 16', 64', 66'	BBC Sport		Attendance: 45,239; Referee: Steven McLean

22 February 2014 Premiership	Heart of Midlothian	0–2	Celtic	Tynecastle Stadium
		BBC Sport	Griffiths 58'; Pukki 90+3'	Attendance: 15,801; Referee: Kevin Clancy

25 February 2014 Premiership	Aberdeen	2–1	Celtic	Pittodrie Stadium
	Hayes 41'; Rooney 45'	BBC Sport	Forrest 62'	Attendance: 16,634; Referee: Craig Thomson

1 March 2014 Premiership	Celtic	5–0	Inverness CT	Celtic Park
	Griffiths 12', 57', 85'; Mulgrew 22'; Commons 78'	BBC Sport		Attendance: 46,552; Referee: Brian Colvin

14 March 2014 Premiership	Kilmarnock	0–3	Celtic	Rugby Park
		BBC Sport	Commons 57', 59', 86'	Attendance: 7,495; Referee: Willie Collum

22 March 2014 Premiership	Celtic	3–0	St Mirren	Celtic Park
	Johansen 44'; Griffiths 61'; Stokes 90+2'	BBC Sport		Attendance: 46,536; Referee: Stephen Finnie

26 March 2014 Premiership	Partick Thistle	1–5	Celtic	Firhill Stadium
	Elliott 85'	BBC Sport	Stokes 4', 90+2'; Henderson 49'; Johansen 53'; Commons 90+3'	Attendance: 7,549; Referee: Steven McLean

29 March 2014 Premiership	Celtic	1–1	Ross County	Celtic Park
	Commons 35'	BBC Sport	de Leeuw 16'	Attendance: 49,270; Referee: John Beaton

5 April 2014 Premiership	Dundee United	0–2	Celtic	Tannadice Park
		BBC Sport	Samaras 5'; Stokes 24'	Attendance: 11,033; Referee: Craig Thomson

19 April 2014 Premiership	Motherwell	3–3	Celtic	Fir Park
	Sutton 5', 90+2'; Francis-Angol 44'	BBC Sport	Stokes 45+1'; Samaras 56'; Griffiths 86'	Attendance: 7,493; Referee: Craig Thomson

27 April 2014 Premiership	Celtic	6–0	Inverness CT	Celtic Park
	Stokes 34', 45+1', 53' (pen.); Griffiths 68'; Ambrose 78'; Pukki 79'	BBC Sport		Attendance: 45,712; Referee: Craig Charleston

3 May 2014 Premiership	Celtic	5–2	Aberdeen	Celtic Park
	Brown 25', 44'; Stokes 53'; Commons 69', 87'	BBC Sport	McGinn 28'; Logan 56'	Attendance: 47,468; Referee: Iain Brines

7 May 2014 Premiership	St Johnstone	3–3	Celtic	McDiarmid Park
	Clancy 9'; Brown 84'; O'Halloran 86'	BBC Sport	Commons 53' (pen.); Pukki 73' van Dijk 77'	Attendance: 4,624; Referee: Steven McLean

11 May 2014 Premiership	Celtic	3–1	Dundee United	Celtic Park
	Stokes 64'; Samaras 75' (pen.); Commons 82'	BBC Sport	F.Twardzik 79' (o.g.)	Attendance: 52,400; Referee: Willie Collum

=== Scottish League Cup ===
24 September 2013 Third round	Celtic	0–1	Greenock Morton	Celtic Park
		BBC Sport	Imrie 97' (pen.)	Attendance: 16,998; Referee: Bobby Madden

=== Scottish Cup ===
1 December 2013 Fourth round	Heart of Midlothian	0–7	Celtic	Tynecastle Stadium
		BBC Sport	Commons 3', 21', 59' (pen.); Brown 33', 74'; Ledley 42'; Lustig 44'	Attendance: 10,636; Referee: Willie Collum

8 February 2014 Fifth round	Celtic	1–2	Aberdeen	Celtic Park
	Stokes 9'	BBC Sport	Anderson 38'; Pawlett 50'	Attendance: 30,413; Referee: Willie Collum

=== UEFA Champions League ===
17 July 2013 Second Qualifying	Cliftonville (Northern Ireland)	0–3	(Scotland) Celtic	Solitude
		BBC Sport	Lustig 25'; Samaras 31'; Forrest 84'	Attendance: 5,442; Referee: Serhiy Boyko

23 July 2013 Second Qualifying	Celtic (Scotland)	2–0 (5–0 agg.)	(Northern Ireland) Cliftonville	Celtic Park
	Ambrose 16'; Samaras 70'	BBC Sport		Attendance: 44,758; Referee: Thorsten Kinhöfer

31 July 2013 Third Qualifying	Celtic (Scotland)	1–0	(Sweden) Elfsborg	Celtic Park
	Commons 76'	BBC Sport		Attendance: 42,153; Referee: Manuel De Sousa

7 August 2013 Third Qualifying	Elfsborg (Sweden)	0–0 (0–1 agg.)	(Scotland) Celtic	Borås Arena
		BBC Sport		Attendance: 9,040; Referee: Vladislav Bezborodov

20 August 2013 Play-off Round	Shakhter Karagandy (Kazakhstan)	2–0	(Scotland) Celtic	Astana Arena
	Finonchenko 12'; Khizhnichenko 77'	BBC Sport		Attendance: 20,950; Referee: Pavel Královec

28 August 2013 Play-off Round	Celtic (Scotland)	3–0 (3–2 agg.)	(Kazakhstan) Shakhter Karagandy	Celtic Park
	Commons 45+1'; Samaras 49'; Forrest 90+2'	BBC Sport		Attendance: 54,500; Referee: Svein Oddvar Moen

18 September 2013 Group stage	AC Milan (Italy)	2–0	(Scotland) Celtic	San Siro
	Izaguirre 82' (o.g.); Muntari 86'	BBC Sport		Attendance: 54,623; Referee: Wolfgang Stark

1 October 2013 Group stage	Celtic (Scotland)	0–1	(Spain) Barcelona	Celtic Park
		BBC Sport	Fàbregas 76'	Attendance: 58,128; Referee: Stéphane Lannoy

22 October 2013 Group stage	Celtic (Scotland)	2–1	(Netherlands) Ajax	Celtic Park
	Forrest 43' (pen.); Kayal 54'	BBC Sport	Schöne 90+4'	Attendance: 58,719; Referee: Ivan Bebek

6 November 2013 Group stage	Ajax (Netherlands)	1–0	(Scotland) Celtic	Amsterdam Arena
	Schöne 51'	BBC Sport		Attendance: 59,908; Referee: Deniz Aytekin

26 November 2013 Group stage	Celtic (Scotland)	0–3	(Italy) AC Milan	Celtic Park
		BBC Report	Kaká 13'; Zapata 49'; Balotelli 60'	Attendance: 58,619; Referee: Cüneyt Çakır

11 December 2013 Group stage	Barcelona (Spain)	6–1	(Scotland) Celtic	Camp Nou
	Piqué 8'; Pedro 39'; Neymar 44', 48', 58'; Tello 72'	BBC Sport	Samaras 88'	Attendance: 54,342; Referee: Sergei Karasev

== Player statistics ==
=== Squad ===
Last updated 11 May 2014

Key: = Appearances, = Goals, = Yellow card, (red card) = Red card

Number	Nation	Position	Name	Total				League				Champions League				League Cup				Scottish Cup			
Number	Nation	Position	Name		Goal	Yellow card	Red card		Goal	Yellow card	Red card		Goal	Yellow card	Red card		Goal	Yellow card	Red card		Goal	Yellow card	Red card
1	(England)	GK	Fraser Forster	51	0	1	0	37	0	1	0	12	0	0	0	0	0	0	0	2	0	0	0
2	(Wales)	DF	Adam Matthews	31	1	3	0	23	1	1	0	6	0	1	0	1	0	0	0	1	0	1	0
3	(Honduras)	DF	Emilio Izaguirre	46	0	8	0	34	0	4	0	10	0	4	0	0	0	0	0	2	0	0	0
4	(Nigeria)	DF	Efe Ambrose	51	3	5	0	38	2	4	0	11	1	1	0	1	0	0	0	2	0	0	0
5	(Netherlands)	DF	Virgil van Dijk	46	5	4	1	36	5	2	1	8	0	2	0	1	0	0	0	2	0	0	0
6	(Israel)	MF	Nir Biton	20	0	0	1	15	0	0	0	3	0	0	1	1	0	0	0	1	0	0	0
8	(Scotland)	MF	Scott Brown	50	4	8	1	38	2	3	0	9	0	4	1	1	0	0	0	2	2	1	0
9	(Greece)	FW	Georgios Samaras	33	11	5	0	20	7	3	0	12	4	2	0	0	0	0	0	1	0	0	0
10	(Republic of Ireland)	FW	Anthony Stokes	46	21	3	1	32	20	2	1	11	0	1	0	1	0	0	0	2	1	0	0
11	(Netherlands)	MF	Derk Boerrigter	23	1	0	0	15	1	0	0	5	0	0	0	1	0	0	0	2	0	0	0
15	(Scotland)	MF	Kris Commons	48	32	4	0	34	27	1	0	11	2	2	0	1	0	0	0	2	3	1	0
17	(Guinea-Bissau)	FW	Amido Baldé	24	3	3	0	20	3	3	0	3	0	0	0	0	0	0	0	1	0	0	0
18	(Australia)	MF	Tom Rogić	7	0	0	0	3	0	0	0	3	0	0	0	1	0	0	0	0	0	0	0
19	(Iceland)	FW	Hólmbert Friðjónsson	0	0	0	0	0	0	0	0	0	0	0	0	0	0	0	0	0	0	0	0
20	(Finland)	FW	Teemu Pukki	32	7	2	0	25	7	2	0	5	0	0	0	1	0	0	0	1	0	0	0
21	(Scotland)	DF	Charlie Mulgrew	40	6	8	0	28	6	5	0	10	0	1	0	1	0	1	0	1	0	1	0
22	(France)	DF	Steven Mouyokolo	3	0	1	0	2	0	0	0	1	0	1	0	0	0	0	0	0	0	0	0
23	(Sweden)	DF	Mikael Lustig	28	2	2	0	15	0	1	0	11	1	1	0	1	0	0	0	1	1	0	0
24	(Poland)	GK	Łukasz Załuska	2	0	0	0	1	0	0	0	0	0	0	0	1	0	0	0	0	0	0	0
25	(Norway)	MF	Stefan Johansen	17	2	4	0	16	2	3	0	0	0	0	0	0	0	0	0	1	0	1	0
28	(Scotland)	FW	Leigh Griffiths	14	7	3	0	13	7	3	0	0	0	0	0	0	0	0	0	1	0	0	0
31	(Scotland)	MF	John Herron	1	0	0	0	1	0	0	0	0	0	0	0	0	0	0	0	0	0	0	0
32	(Scotland)	FW	Tony Watt	3	0	0	0	2	0	0	0	1	0	0	0	0	0	0	0	0	0	0	0
33	(Israel)	MF	Beram Kayal	20	1	3	0	13	0	2	0	7	1	1	0	0	0	0	0	0	0	0	0
34	(Republic of Ireland)	DF	Eoghan O'Connell	1	0	0	0	1	0	0	0	0	0	0	0	0	0	0	0	0	0	0	0
36	(Australia)	DF	Jackson Irvine	0	0	0	0	0	0	0	0	0	0	0	0	0	0	0	0	0	0	0	0
37	(Bosnia and Herzegovina)	FW	Bahrudin Atajić	3	1	0	0	3	1	0	0	0	0	0	0	0	0	0	0	0	0	0	0
38	(Italy)	GK	Leo Fasan	0	0	0	0	0	0	0	0	0	0	0	0	0	0	0	0	0	0	0	0
39	(Scotland)	FW	Denny Johnstone	0	0	0	0	0	0	0	0	0	0	0	0	0	0	0	0	0	0	0	0
41	(England)	DF	Darnell Fisher	13	0	2	0	12	0	2	0	0	0	0	0	0	0	0	0	1	0	0	0
42	(Scotland)	MF	Callum McGregor	0	0	0	0	0	0	0	0	0	0	0	0	0	0	0	0	0	0	0	0
43	(Scotland)	DF	Joe Chalmers	0	0	0	0	0	0	0	0	0	0	0	0	0	0	0	0	0	0	0	0
44	(Scotland)	DF	Marcus Fraser	0	0	0	0	0	0	0	0	0	0	0	0	0	0	0	0	0	0	0	0
45	(Scotland)	DF	Lewis Toshney	0	0	0	0	0	0	0	0	0	0	0	0	0	0	0	0	0	0	0	0
46	(Scotland)	MF	Dylan McGeouch	3	0	0	0	1	0	0	0	1	0	0	0	1	0	0	0	0	0	0	0
49	(Scotland)	MF	James Forrest	27	7	1	0	16	4	1	0	10	3	0	0	0	0	0	0	1	0	0	0
50	(Republic of Ireland)	MF	Paul George	0	0	0	0	0	0	0	0	0	0	0	0	0	0	0	0	0	0	0	0
53	(Scotland)	MF	Liam Henderson	8	1	1	0	8	1	1	0	0	0	0	0	0	0	0	0	0	0	0	0
56	(Czech Republic)	MF	Filip Twardzik	1	0	0	0	1	0	0	0	0	0	0	0	0	0	0	0	0	0	0	0
Players who no longer play for Celtic
6	(England)	DF	Kelvin Wilson	4	0	0	0	0	0	0	0	4	0	0	0	0	0	0	0	0	0	0	0
16	(Wales)	MF	Joe Ledley	28	5	1	0	20	4	0	0	7	0	1	0	0	0	0	0	1	1	0	0
88	(England)	FW	Gary Hooper	1	0	0	0	0	0	0	0	1	0	0	0	0	0	0	0	0	0	0	0

=== Goalscorers ===
Last updated 11 May 2014

R	Player	Scottish Premiership	Scottish Cup	Scottish League Cup	UEFA Champions League	Total
1	(Scotland) Kris Commons	27	3	0	2	32
2	(Republic of Ireland) Anthony Stokes	20	1	0	0	21
3	(Greece) Georgios Samaras	7	0	0	4	11
4	(Scotland) James Forrest	4	0	0	3	7
4	(Scotland) Leigh Griffiths	7	0	0	0	7
4	(Finland) Teemu Pukki	7	0	0	0	7
5	(Scotland) Charlie Mulgrew	6	0	0	0	6
6	(Wales) Joe Ledley	4	1	0	0	5
6	(Netherlands) Virgil van Dijk	5	0	0	0	5
7	(Scotland) Scott Brown	2	2	0	0	4
8	(Guinea-Bissau) Amido Baldé	3	0	0	0	3
8	(Nigeria) Efe Ambrose	2	0	0	1	3
9	(Sweden) Mikael Lustig	0	1	0	1	2
9	(Norway) Stefan Johansen	2	0	0	0	2
10	(Wales) Adam Matthews	1	0	0	0	1
10	(Israel) Beram Kayal	0	0	0	1	1
10	(Netherlands) Derk Boerrigter	1	0	0	0	1
10	(Bosnia and Herzegovina) Bahrudin Atajić	1	0	0	0	1
10	(Scotland) Liam Henderson	1	0	0	0	1

== Team statistics ==
=== Competition overview ===
Competition	First match	Last match	Final position	Record								
Competition	First match	Last match	Final position	G	W	D	L	GF	GA	GD	Win %	Ref.
Premiership	3 August 2013	11 May 2014	Winner	38	31	6	1	102	25	+77	81.58	
Scottish Cup	1 December 2013	8 February 2014	Round of 16	2	1	0	1	8	2	+6	50.00	
League Cup	24 September 2013	24 September 2013	Round of 16	1	0	0	1	0	1	−1	0.00	
Champions League	17 July 2013	11 December 2013	Group Stage	12	5	1	6	12	16	−4	41.67	
Total				53	37	7	9	122	44	+78	69.81	—

=== League table ===
Pos	Team	Pld	W	D	L	GF	GA	GD	Pts	Qualification or relegation
1	Celtic (C)	38	31	6	1	102	25	+77	99	Qualification for the Champions League second qualifying round
2	Motherwell	38	22	4	12	64	60	+4	70	Qualification for the Europa League second qualifying round
3	Aberdeen	38	20	8	10	53	38	+15	68	Qualification for the Europa League first qualifying round
4	Dundee United	38	16	10	12	65	50	+15	58	
5	Inverness Caledonian Thistle	38	16	9	13	44	44	0	57	

Source: SPFL Archive
Rules for classification: 1) points; 2) goal difference; 3) number of goals scored.
(C) Champions

=== Champions League table ===
Pos	Team	Pld	W	D	L	GF	GA	GD	Pts	Qualification	BAR	MIL	AJX	CEL
1	(Spain) Barcelona	6	4	1	1	16	5	+11	13	Advance to knockout phase	—	3–1	4–0	6–1
2	(Italy) Milan	6	2	3	1	8	5	+3	9	Advance to knockout phase	1–1	—	0–0	2–0
3	(Netherlands) Ajax	6	2	2	2	5	8	−3	8	Transfer to Europa League	2–1	1–1	—	1–0
4	(Scotland) Celtic	6	1	0	5	3	14	−11	3		0–1	0–3	2–1	—

Source: UEFA

== Transfers ==
=== Players in ===
Dates	Player	From	Fee
13 June 2013	(Guinea-Bissau) Amido Baldé	(Portugal) Vitória Guimarães	£1,800,000
21 June 2013	(Netherlands) Virgil van Dijk	(Netherlands) FC Groningen	£2,600,000
16 July 2013	(France) Steven Mouyokolo	Unattached	Free
30 July 2013	(Netherlands) Derk Boerrigter	(Netherlands) Ajax	£3,000,000
30 August 2013	(Israel) Nir Bitton	(Israel) F.C. Ashdod	£700,000
31 August 2013	(Finland) Teemu Pukki	(Germany) FC Schalke 04	£3,000,000
1 September 2013	(Germany) Max Oberschmidt	(England) Fulham	Loan
1 January 2014	(Iceland) Hólmbert Friðjónsson	(Iceland) Fram Reykjavík	£100,000
15 January 2014	(Norway) Stefan Johansen	(Norway) Strømsgodset	£2,000,000
31 January 2014	(Scotland) Leigh Griffiths	(England) Wolverhampton Wanderers	£1,000,000

Total spend: £13.6 million

=== Players out ===
Dates	Player	To	Fee
1 July 2013	(Republic of Ireland) Daryl Murphy	(England) Ipswich Town	Free
1 July 2013	(Norway) Thomas Rogne	(England) Wigan Athletic	Free
11 July 2013	(Kenya) Victor Wanyama	(England) Southampton	£12,500,000
18 July 2013	(Scotland) James Keatings	(Scotland) Hamilton Academical	Free
26 July 2013	(Scotland) Robbie Thomson	(England) Rochdale	Free
26 July 2013	(England) Gary Hooper	(England) Norwich City	£5,500,000
7 August 2013	(Scotland) Callum McGregor	(England) Notts County	Loan
9 August 2013	(England) Kelvin Wilson	(England) Nottingham Forest	£2,500,000
15 August 2013	(Australia) Jackson Irvine	(Scotland) Kilmarnock	Loan
22 August 2013	(Northern Ireland) Paddy McCourt	(England) Barnsley	Free
1 September 2013	(Scotland) Tony Watt	(Belgium) Lierse	Loan
4 December 2013	(Tunisia) Lassad Nouioui	(Portugal) Arouca	Free
14 January 2014	(Republic of Ireland) Paul George	(Scotland) Hamilton Academical	Loan
21 January 2014	(Australia) Tom Rogić	(Australia) Melbourne Victory	Loan
24 January 2014	(Bosnia and Herzegovina) Bahrudin Atajić	(England) Shrewsbury Town	Loan
24 January 2014	(Scotland) Stuart Findlay	(Scotland) Greenock Morton	Loan
30 January 2014	(Scotland) Dylan McGeouch	(England) Coventry City	Loan
31 January 2014	(Sierra Leone) Mohamed Bangura	(Turkey) Başakşehir	Free
31 January 2014	(Scotland) Michael Miller	(Scotland) Dumbarton	Loan
31 January 2014	(Scotland) Joe Chalmers	(Scotland) Falkirk	Loan
31 January 2014	(Wales) Joe Ledley	(England) Crystal Palace	£700,000

Total received: £21 million

== See also ==
- List of Celtic F.C. seasons
- Nine in a row
