= Kris Boyd =

Scottish footballer (born 1983)

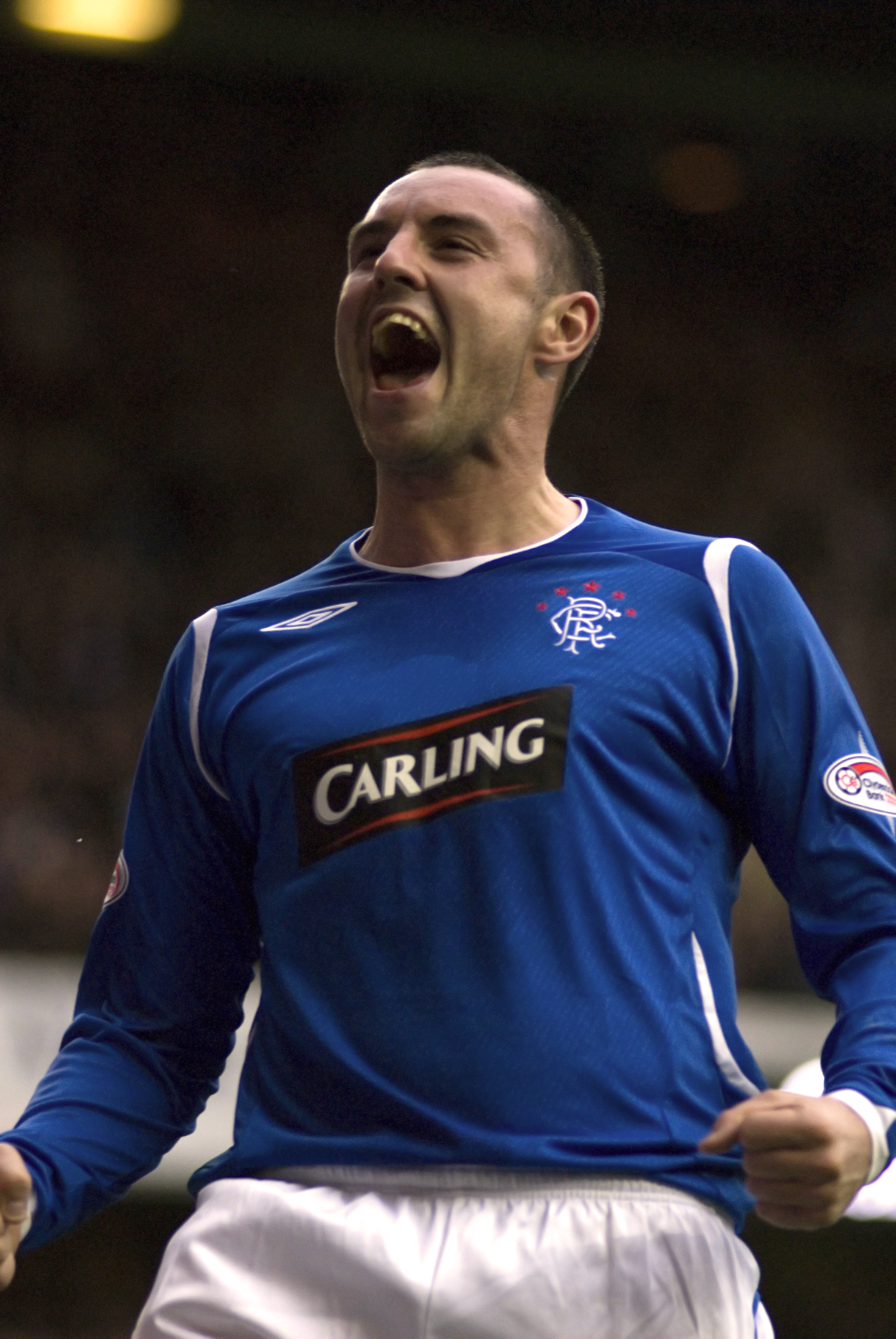
- Boyd playing for Rangers in 2008

Personal information
- Full name: Kris Boyd
- Date of birth: 18 August 1983 (age 43)
- Place of birth: Irvine, Ayrshire, Scotland
- Height: 6 ft 0 in (1.83 m)
- Position: Forward

Youth career
- 1999–2001: Kilmarnock

Senior career*
Years	Team	Apps	(Gls)
2001–2006	Kilmarnock	153	(63)
2006–2010	Rangers	143	(101)
2010–2011	Middlesbrough	27	(6)
2011	→ Nottingham Forest (loan)	10	(6)
2011	Eskişehirspor	2	(0)
2012	Portland Timbers	26	(7)
2013–2014	Kilmarnock	44	(25)
2014–2015	Rangers	29	(3)
2015–2019	Kilmarnock	109	(33)
Total		543	(244)

International career
2002–2005	Scotland U21	8	(1)
2003–2006	Scotland B	3	(0)
2006–2010	Scotland	18	(7)
- * Club domestic league appearances and goals

Kris Boyd (born 18 August 1983) is a Scottish former professional footballer currently working as a football pundit for Sky Sports.

Playing as a forward, Boyd started his senior career with Kilmarnock. He transferred to Rangers in January 2006, and was their top goalscorer in each of his seasons at Ibrox. He is the top goalscorer in the history of the Scottish Premier League, with 167 goals in total.

Boyd had a short spell in English football with Middlesbrough, during which time he was sent on loan to Nottingham Forest. He signed for Turkish club Eskişehirspor in 2011, but terminated his contract after five months and moved to the Portland Timbers of Major League Soccer in January 2012. He later returned to both Kilmarnock and Rangers.

Having played several games for the Scotland U21 and Scotland B teams, Boyd received his first cap for the senior Scotland national team in 2006. He scored seven goals in eighteen appearances for the senior national side over four years. He is now a regular pundit on Sky Sports Soccer Saturday.

== Early footballing life ==
As a youth, Boyd played in 17 matches as a full back for Rangers. He was released, and became a striker when he joined the youth development program at Kilmarnock, ten miles from his home village, at the age of 12.

== Club career ==
=== Kilmarnock (first spell) ===
Boyd signed a senior contract with Kilmarnock at the age of sixteen on 25 August 1999, and made his debut for the club as a substitute on the last day of the 2000–01 season against Celtic. He was given his chance to stake a place in the team the following season with the departures of Ally McCoist (who finished his career the day of Boyd's debut) and Christophe Cocard, scoring four goals in total.

Boyd started the 2002–03 season, in "impressive" form and won the SPL Young Player of the Month award for August. In total he scored 12 times in the season and won Kilmarnock's Young Player of the Year award. His form attracted the interest of Wolverhampton Wanderers, and he had a trial with the Molineux club in August 2003. Boyd scored a total of fifteen goals in the 2003–04 season. In September 2004, he equalled a Scottish Premier League record when he scored all five of Kilmarnock's goals against Dundee United. He scored 19 goals in all competitions in the 2004–05 season, and was then linked with a move to Aberdeen.

Boyd's form during the 2005–06 attracted interest from Championship sides Cardiff City and Sheffield Wednesday had offers accepted by Kilmarnock, however, Boyd rejected the moves.

=== Rangers (first spell) ===
Following speculation that he would sign in the January transfer window, Boyd officially joined Rangers on 1 January 2006. He was signed for a fee of around £500,000 on a contract lasting until the summer of 2009. He waived half of his £40,000 signing on fee, which Kilmarnock were due to pay him under the terms of his contract, to help fund the youth setup at Kilmarnock.

He made his debut on 7 January 2006 against Peterhead in the Scottish Cup third round, in which he scored a hat-trick during a 5–0 win. He went on to score 20 goals in 17 starts for Rangers in the second half of that season, ending it with a total of 37 goals for Rangers and Kilmarnock. He became the first player to finish top scorer at two clubs in one season, having scored 17 goals for Kilmarnock before his move.

After scoring a penalty against Motherwell in January 2007, Boyd was involved in controversy when he held up six fingers, reportedly in a show of solidarity for former club captain Barry Ferguson (who wore the number six shirt), who had been stripped of his position and dropped from the team following a dispute with Paul Le Guen. Le Guen left the club days later and was replaced by the then Scotland manager Walter Smith. By the end of that season, Boyd scored 25 goals for Rangers in all competitions. Boyd scored his 100th Scottish Premier League goal, and his first against Celtic on 5 May 2007, in a 2–0 victory for Rangers.

The 2007–08 season saw Boyd score his 50th and 51st goals in all competitions for Rangers in a League Cup match against East Fife on 26 September 2007, 627 days after his debut. This made him the second fastest Rangers player ever to reach 50 goals for the club, behind Jim Forrest.

Boyd won the first trophy of his career on 16 March 2008 when Rangers defeated Dundee United to win the 2008 League Cup. He scored both of Rangers' goals in the 2–2 draw and scored the winning penalty in the subsequent penalty shootout. He also scored a double in the 2008 Scottish Cup Final, a 3–2 win over Queen of the South. He finished that season with 25 goals in all competitions for Rangers.

In January 2009, speculation surfaced about a possible move to Birmingham City to play for former Rangers manager, Alex McLeish. Rangers accepted a bid of nearly £4 million; however, Boyd could not agree personal terms and decided to stay at Rangers. In season 2008–09 Boyd won his first Scottish Premier League title and another Scottish Cup. Having also been linked to Lazio and sporting director Igli Tare being quoted as stating his admiration for the player, club president Claudio Lotito responded by claiming he did not know who Boyd was. He finished as top scorer again for Rangers with 31 goals in all competitions, his highest total yet, and was awarded the club's first Sam English Bowl for top Rangers scorer in a season.

On 30 December 2009, Boyd scored five goals in a 7–1 victory over Dundee United; in doing so, he passed Henrik Larsson as the all-time leader in goals in the Scottish Premier League. On 1 May 2010, Boyd scored his 100th league goal for Rangers at Tannadice against Dundee United.

In the 2009–10 season, Boyd was the top scorer with Rangers and the Scottish Premier League again with 26 goals in 40 games. With this return he won the Sam English Bowl for the second time and the Scottish Premier League and League Cup both for the second time. On 28 May 2010, Rangers admitted that Boyd would be leaving once his contract runs out.

=== Middlesbrough ===
On 5 July 2010, Boyd signed a two-year contract with Championship side Middlesbrough, with a weekly wage estimated to be around £30,000. On 22 August 2010, he scored his first goal for Middlesbrough in a 1–0 victory against Sheffield United. His second followed on 28 September against Derby County. Boyd scored in a 2–1 defeat against Leeds United on 16 October 2010, which was Gordon Strachan's final game in charge of the club. He scored his fourth of the season against Bristol City in Tony Mowbray's first game as Boro boss. On 9 November 2010, Boyd scored the opener in Middlesbrough's 2–0 win over Scunthorpe. Boyd achieved his 200th club career goal on 1 February 2011, in scoring the first in Middlesbrough's 2–0 home victory over Scunthorpe by latching onto a long ball from Seb Hines before lobbing the goalkeeper. On 8 March 2011, Boyd joined Nottingham Forest on loan until the end of the 2010–11 season.

==== Loan to Nottingham Forest ====
Despite speculation during the January transfer window, Boyd remained at Middlesbrough and had not started a match for a month by the time the loan deal was signed, having only started 19 games the whole season for Middlesbrough. Boyd's loan deal was signed until the end of the 2010–11 season and Boyd was issued with the number 22 jersey. Nottingham Forest goalkeeper Paul Smith moved in the opposite direction because of injuries at Middlesbrough. The same day he made his move to Forest, Boyd debuted from the bench in a 2–1 defeat to Sheffield United. He scored six goals in ten league appearances for Forest, taking his total in the Football League Championship to twelve.

=== Eskişehirspor ===
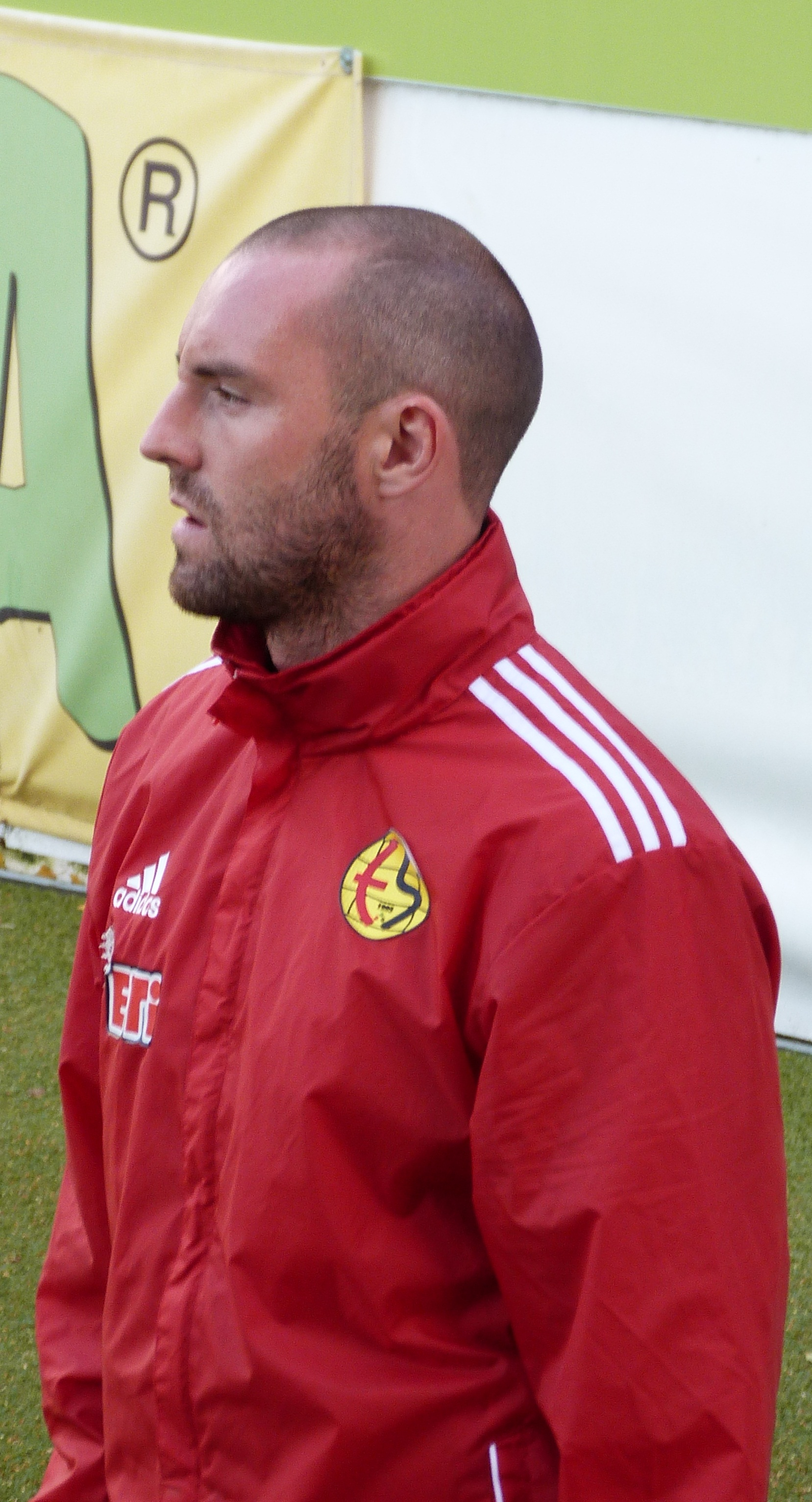
Boyd during his time with Eskişehirspor

Boyd signed a three-year contract with Turkish Süper Lig club Eskişehirspor on 8 July 2011.

Boyd terminated his contract on 19 December 2011 and started legal proceedings against Eskişehirspor claiming he had never been paid during his stay at the club. He played just 76 minutes of league football for Eskişehirspor.

=== Portland Timbers ===
On 23 January 2012, Boyd declined a contract offer from Major League Soccer side Houston Dynamo. Boyd instead signed with Portland Timbers of MLS on 30 January 2012, becoming the club's second Designated Player. As Houston held exclusive rights within MLS to negotiate with Boyd, Portland were forced to trade a first-round pick in the 2013 MLS SuperDraft to the Dynamo for the right to sign him.

Boyd scored his first goal for the Timbers on 4 March 2012 during a pre-season exhibition against AIK of Sweden. Eight days later, Boyd made his league debut in their season opener, where he scored Timbers' second goal of a 3–1 victory against Philadelphia Union. Boyd featured less frequently, however, after head coach John Spencer was fired. He scored seven goals in 26 appearances for Portland in the 2012 Major League Soccer season. On 31 January 2013, the Timbers announced that they had mutually agreed to end Boyd's contract.

=== Kilmarnock (second spell) ===
Boyd signed a short-term deal until the end of the 2012–13 season with Kilmarnock in February 2013. Boyd was given the number eleven shirt. In 2013–14, Boyd went on to have his most prolific season for Kilmarnock, scoring 22 goals in 37 matches. His success in front of goal garnered a Scotland recall and a Player of the Year nomination.

=== Rangers (second spell) ===
Boyd signed a one-year contract with Rangers, of the Scottish Championship, on 27 June 2014. He made his first competitive appearance of his second spell at Ibrox on 5 August 2014; playing in Rangers' 2–1 win over Hibernian in the first round of the Challenge Cup. A fortnight later, Boyd scored his first goals of the season; netting a hat-trick in an 8–1 rout of Clyde in the second round of the Challenge Cup. Boyd was released by Rangers at the end of the season, along with several other players, after the club failed to gain promotion to the Scottish Premiership.

=== Kilmarnock (third spell) ===
Boyd signed a three-year contract with Kilmarnock in June 2015. On 13 August 2016, Boyd scored his 100th goal for Kilmarnock, in a 2–1 win away to Hamilton Academical. He scored the fastest goal in Scottish Premiership history after just 10 seconds on 28 January 2016, in a 3–2 home defeat of Ross County. Boyd scored his 200th top flight league goal, in a 2–1 home defeat to Motherwell on 6 March 2017, becoming the fifth post-war player to reach that milestone. In December 2017, Boyd scored both Kilmarnock goals in a 2–1 win against Rangers.

Boyd enjoyed a renaissance in his fortunes in the 2017–18 season, under the management of Steve Clarke. He finished as the top goalscorer in the 2017–18 Scottish Premiership with 18 goals, and was nominated for both the PFA (Players') and SWFA (Writers') Player of the Year awards.

On 6 April 2019, Boyd scored from the penalty-spot in a 2–0 victory over St Johnstone. With the goal, Boyd became the club's joint-second league goalscorer of all time, level with Eddie Morrison on 121 goals. It was also Boyd's 300th goal in his professional football career across his various clubs and with Scotland.

He announced his retirement from professional football in June 2019.

== International career ==
Boyd was regularly selected for the Scotland under-21 team, winning eight caps and scoring once.

On 11 May 2006, he made his debut for the Scotland national team and scored twice in a 5–1 win over Bulgaria in the Kirin Cup. Boyd then took part in European Championship qualifying, scoring twice against the Faroe Islands in a 6–0 win and also against Georgia in a 2–1 win, his fifth goal in six games.

On 11 October 2008, Boyd stated that he would not play international football again under manager George Burley. His decision came after Burley had left Boyd on the substitute bench in a 0–0 World Cup qualifying match against Norway, opting to bring on debutant Chris Iwelumo instead. When asked about the decision, Burley stated that Boyd had "to establish himself in the Rangers team, which he hasn't done". After hearing those comments, Boyd contacted Burley to inform him of his decision, and confirmed his decision with Gordon Smith, the chief executive of the Scottish Football Association. At a press conference on 13 October 2008, Burley hinted that the door might not be closed should Boyd reconsider, stating that Boyd, rather than he, had "made the decision", and that "... if [Boyd] is totally committed, that's what the country needs". On 16 November 2009, Burley was sacked as manager of Scotland after winning just three out of fourteen games as manager.

After Craig Levein was appointed manager of Scotland in December 2009, Boyd stated that he was "ready and willing" to play for Scotland again. He was called up to the Scotland squad to play against the Czech Republic in a friendly on 3 March, and he received his sixteenth cap in the second half of the game. His most recent international appearance was in a Euro 2012 qualifier against Liechtenstein on 7 September 2010. Boyd was recalled to the squad for a friendly match with Norway in November 2013, but he did not play.

His performances for Kilmarnock during the 2017–18 season led to suggestions that Boyd could be recalled to the national squad, aged 34. Boyd said that he was open to a recall, but also stated his belief that the national team needed to develop younger players.

== Style of play ==
Boyd is typically defined as a goal poacher, whose key attribute is his strike rate. He scored an average of two goals for every three games when he arrived at Rangers; many of which came from the substitute bench, making his goals-to-games ratio even more impressive. He prefers to play in the penalty box, where he can play off the shoulder of defenders who are close to their goals. Former Rangers manager Alex McLeish compared him to rival Ally McCoist in goalscoring ability.

When he fails to score, however, his overall contribution to the team is sometimes questioned. Manager Walter Smith occasionally chose not to play him owing to his lack of contribution to the overall team performance. With Smith's common 4–5–1 formation, Boyd was not seen to be an effective lone striker.

== Personal life ==
In 2016, Boyd's younger brother Scott took his own life aged 27 without explanation. 16 months later, the Kris Boyd Charity was established with the aim of assisting persons with mental health problems and to encourage discussion of the issues causing them.

== Career statistics ==
=== Club ===
Appearances and goals by club, season and competition
Club	Season	League			National cup (Note: Includes Scottish Cup, FA Cup, Turkish Cup, U.S. Open Cup)		League cup (Note: Includes Scottish League Cup, Football League Cup)		Continental		Other		Total	
Club	Season	Division	Apps	Goals	Apps	Goals	Apps	Goals	Apps	Goals	Apps	Goals	Apps	Goals
Kilmarnock	2000–01	Scottish Premier League	1	0	0	0	0	0	—		—		1	0
Kilmarnock	2001–02	Scottish Premier League	28	4	2	0	1	0	1 (Note: Appearance in UEFA Cup)	0	—		32	4
Kilmarnock	2002–03	Scottish Premier League	38	12	1	0	1	0	—		—		40	12
Kilmarnock	2003–04	Scottish Premier League	37	15	2	0	1	0	—		—		40	15
Kilmarnock	2004–05	Scottish Premier League	30	17	3	2	2	0	—		—		35	19
Kilmarnock	2005–06	Scottish Premier League	19	15	0	0	1	2	—		—		20	17
Kilmarnock	Total		153	63	8	2	6	2	1	0	—		168	67
Rangers	2005–06	Scottish Premier League	17	17	2	3	0	0	2 (Note: Appearances in UEFA Champions League)	0	—		21	20
Rangers	2006–07	Scottish Premier League	32	20	1	2	2	1	8	3	—		43	26
Rangers	2007–08	Scottish Premier League	28	14	6	6	3	5	4 (Note: Two appearances in UEFA Champions League, two appearances in UEFA Cup)	0	—		41	25
Rangers	2008–09	Scottish Premier League	35	27	5	1	4	3	2	0	—		46	31
Rangers	2009–10	Scottish Premier League	31	23	5	3	2	0	2	0	—		40	26
Rangers	Total		143	101	19	15	11	9	18	3	—		191	128
Middlesbrough	2010–11	Championship	27	6	1	0	1	0	—		—		29	6
Nottingham Forest (loan)	2010–11	Championship	10	6	0	0	0	0	—		2 (Note: Appearances in Championship play-offs)	0	12	6
Eskişehirspor	2011–12	Süper Lig	2	0	0	0	—		—		—		2	0
Portland Timbers	2012	MLS	26	7	1	0	—		—		—		27	7
Kilmarnock	2012–13	Scottish Premier League	8	3	1	0	0	0	—		—		9	3
Kilmarnock	2013–14	Scottish Premiership	36	22	1	0	0	0	—		—		37	22
Kilmarnock	Total		44	25	2	0	0	0	—		—		46	25
Rangers	2014–15	Scottish Championship	29	3	3	2	4	2	—		7 (Note: Four appearances and three goals in Scottish Challenge Cup, three appearances in Scottish Premiership play-offs)	3	43	10
Kilmarnock	2015–16	Scottish Premiership	29	5	0	0	2	1	—		2 (Note: Appearances in Scottish Premiership play-offs)	1	33	7
Kilmarnock	2016–17	Scottish Premiership	27	8	1	0	1	0	—		—		29	8
Kilmarnock	2017–18	Scottish Premiership	34	18	4	2	4	3	—		—		42	23
Kilmarnock	2018–19	Scottish Premiership	19	2	2	0	4	4	—		—		25	6
Kilmarnock	Total		109	33	7	2	11	8	—		2	1	129	44
Career total			543	244	41	21	33	21	19	3	11	4	647	293

=== International ===
Appearances and goals by national team and year
National team	Year	Apps	Goals
Scotland	2006	6	4
Scotland	2007	8	3
Scotland	2008	2	0
Scotland	2010	2	0
Total		18	7

Scores and results list Scotland's goal tally first, score column indicates score after each Boyd goal.

List of international goals scored by Kris Boyd
No.	Date	Venue	Opponent	Score	Result	Competition	Ref.
1	11 May 2006	Kobe Wing Stadium, Kobe, Japan	Bulgaria	1–0	5–1	2005 Kirin Cup	
2	11 May 2006	Kobe Wing Stadium, Kobe, Japan	Bulgaria	2–1	5–1	2005 Kirin Cup	
3	2 September 2006	Celtic Park, Glasgow, Scotland	Faroe Islands	3–0	6–0	UEFA Euro 2008 qualification	
4	2 September 2006	Celtic Park, Glasgow, Scotland	Faroe Islands	5–0	6–0	UEFA Euro 2008 qualification	
5	24 March 2007	Hampden Park, Glasgow, Scotland	Georgia	1–0	2–1	UEFA Euro 2008 qualification	
6	22 August 2007	Pittodrie Stadium, Aberdeen, Scotland	South Africa	1–0	1–0	Friendly	
7	8 September 2007	Hampden Park, Glasgow, Scotland	Lithuania	1–0	3–1	UEFA Euro 2008 qualification	

== Honours ==
=== Club ===
Rangers

- Scottish Premier League: 2008–09, 2009–10
- Scottish Cup: 2007–08, 2008–09
- Scottish League Cup: 2007–08, 2009–10
- UEFA Cup runner-up: 2007–08

=== International ===
Scotland

- Kirin Cup: 2006

=== Individual ===
- Scottish league top goalscorer (5): 2005–06, 2006–07, 2008–09, 2009–10, 2017–18
- Scottish Premier League Golden Boot (broke SPL goalscoring record): January 2010
- PFA Scotland Players' Player of the Year (shortlisted): 2005–06, 2009–10, 2013–14, 2017–18
- PFA Scotland Young Player of the Year (shortlisted): 2005–06
- SFWA Footballer of the Year (shortlisted): 2005–06.
- Scottish Premier League Player of the Month (3): November 2005, January 2006, December 2009
- Scottish Premiership Player of the Month: December 2017
- Scottish Premier League Young Player of the Month: August 2002, January 2003
- Kilmarnock Hall of Fame

== See also ==
- List of footballers in Scotland by number of league goals (200+)
