= Henrik Larsson =

Swedish footballer and manager (born 1971)

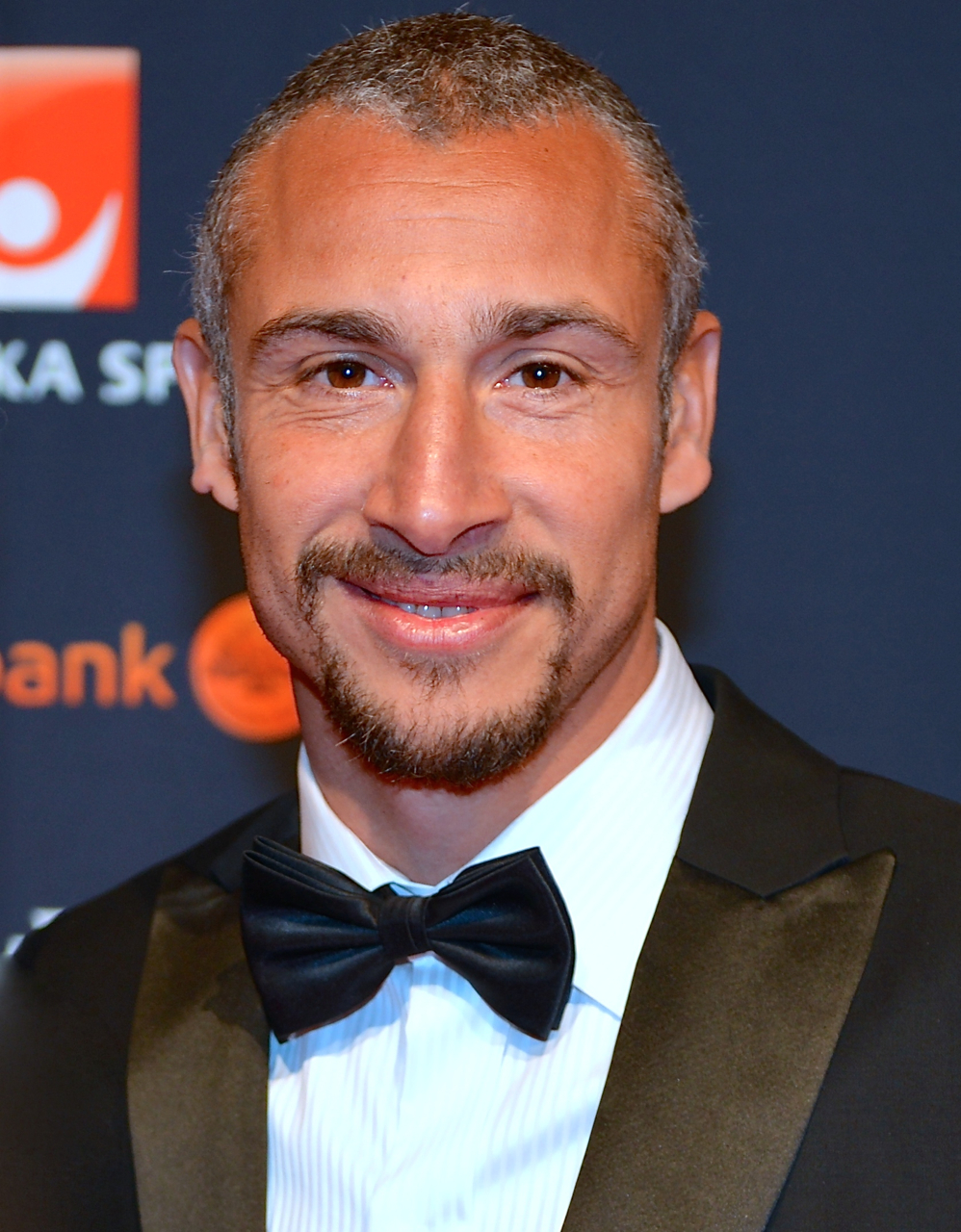
- Larsson in 2014

Personal information
- Full name: Edward Henrik Larsson
- Date of birth: 20 September 1971 (age 55)
- Place of birth: Helsingborg, Sweden
- Height: 1.77 m (5 ft 10 in)
- Position: Striker

Youth career
- 1977–1988: Högaborgs BK

Senior career*
Years	Team	Apps	(Gls)
1989–1991	Högaborgs BK	64	(23)
1992–1993	Helsingborgs IF	56	(51)
1993–1997	Feyenoord	101	(26)
1997–2004	Celtic	221	(174)
2004–2006	Barcelona	40	(13)
2006–2009	Helsingborgs IF	84	(38)
2007	→ Manchester United (loan)	7	(1)
2012	Råå IF	1	(0)
2013	Högaborgs BK	1	(0)
Total		575	(325)

International career
1992–1993	Sweden U21	12	(4)
1997	Sweden B	1	(0)
1993–2009	Sweden	106	(37)

Managerial career
- 2010–2012: Landskrona BoIS
- 2014: Falkenbergs FF
- 2015–2016: Helsingborgs IF
- 2019: Helsingborgs IF
Medal record
Men's football
Representing Sweden
FIFA World Cup
Third place	1994 United States
- * Club domestic league appearances and goals

Edward Henrik Larsson (Swedish pronunciation: [ˈhɛnːrɪk ˈlɑːʂɔn]; born 20 September 1971) is a Swedish professional football coach and former player who played 106 times for the Swedish national team. A striker, Larsson began his career with Högaborgs BK. In 1992, he moved to Helsingborg IF where in his first campaign he helped the club win promotion to Allsvenskan after 24 seasons. He moved to Feyenoord in November 1993, staying for four years before leaving in 1997 to join Scottish Premiership club Celtic and enjoying great success there. During his time in the Dutch Eredivisie, he won two KNVB Cups with Feyenoord. He later played for Barcelona, earning the Spanish title twice and the Champions League before returning to Helsingborg. He had a loan spell at Manchester United, with whom he won the English Premier League in 2006–07, and retired in 2009.

Larsson is often regarded as one of the greatest foreign imports in Scottish football, having been signed by Wim Jansen for Celtic in July 1997 for a fee of £650,000. In his first season at the club, he played a crucial role in Celtic winning their first league title in ten years. Larsson suffered a broken leg in a UEFA Cup tie against Lyon in 1999. He returned to score 53 goals in a 2000–01 season that saw him win the European Golden Shoe. Larsson won four league titles in his seven years at Celtic. He also helped the team reach the 2003 UEFA Cup final against Porto, scoring both goals in a 3–2 defeat in extra time. His 242 goals in 313 matches saw Celtic fans nickname him The King of Kings.

Larsson played for Sweden in three FIFA World Cups and three UEFA European Championships, winning a bronze medal at the 1994 FIFA World Cup, and is a former captain of the national team. He ended his international career with 37 goals in 106 matches. He also won the Golden Ball (Guldbollen), the annual Award for best Swedish footballer twice, first in 1998 and again in 2004, while in 2003 he was named the Greatest Swedish Footballer of the Last 50 Years as part of the UEFA Jubilee Awards.

In 2010, Larsson began his career as a manager at the Superettan club Landskrona BoIS, where he stayed for three seasons. He later managed Falkenberg in Allsvenskan, and he took over at Helsingborg in 2015, where his son, Jordan, was one of his players. Helsingborg were relegated to Superettan in 2016 and Larsson left the club. Three years later he made a brief return in the same role at the club. He served Barcelona as assistant to Ronald Koeman from August 2020 until October 2021.

== Early life ==
Edward Henrik Larsson was born on 20 September 1971 in Helsingborg, Scania. His father, Francisco da Rocha (died 2025), was from Cape Verde, and his mother, Eva Larsson, is Swedish. His parents, who never married and split up when he was 12, decided that he should take his mother's surname because they felt it would make it easier for their son to be accepted in Sweden. He credits his father for his love of football: his father gave him a football when he was 16 months old and as a child, he was able to practice with brothers and friends on a large field near his home on the Närlunda estate in Helsingborg. He has said of his school years, "I experienced some racism, because back then it was unusual to have a dark kid at school, I was one of the few." He watched English football on television and his parents gave him a video of Pelé's life story, both of which inspired him.

== Club career ==
=== Early career ===
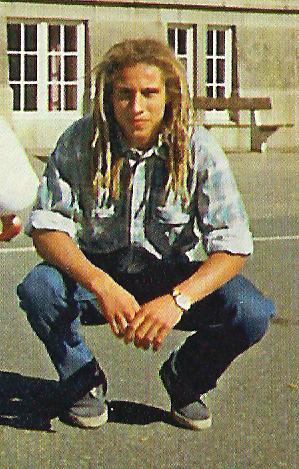
Larsson at the schoolyard of Magnus Stenbocksskolan in Helsingborg, June 1993

Larsson began playing at lower-league Högaborg at age six. This smaller club was known to provide a good education for young players, and since Larsson left he has stressed how important this was not only for his football but also for his adult life in general. He went on to start his professional career playing for their senior team at age 17 while still at school. When he was 18, he had a trial at Benfica, at the time being managed by Larsson's compatriot Sven-Göran Eriksson. On leaving school at 18, Larsson combined a semi-pro football career at Högaborg with work as a fruit packer.

In four years playing at senior level with Högaborg, Larsson scored 23 goals in 74 matches. In 1992, second-division side Helsingborg (the main club of his home city) signed Larsson.

=== Helsingborg ===
In his first year as a full-time professional, Larsson scored 34 goals for Helsingborg and his partnership up front with veteran striker Mats Magnusson helped the side win promotion to the top Swedish division, the Allsvenskan, the club's return to the top tier after 24 seasons in the lower divisions. His star continued to rise the following year, as he netted 16 goals to help Helsingborg to a mid-table finish.

The Södra was split into Spring and Autumn leagues, Henrik scored 15 goals in 14 games in the former and 17 goals in 13 games in the latter. After then failing to score in the three placement qualifier matches, he scored twice in a 9–1 aggregate play-off win against IFK Sundsvall that sealed promotion.

=== Feyenoord ===
In November 1993, Dutch side Feyenoord signed Larsson for a fee of £295,000. He made his league debut on 21 November 1993 as a substitute for Regi Blinker in a 1–1 home draw against Vitesse. Larsson scored six goals in 27 appearances in his first season. His goalscoring record improved in subsequent seasons, but he continued to be unsettled and frustrated by a combination of ever-changing coaches, being played in unfamiliar positions and latterly the club's player-rotation policy which saw him being substituted fifty or sixty minutes into a match even when playing well.

Larsson won his first major winner's medal on 12 May 1994, when he played in the Feyenoord side which defeated NEC 2–1 in the final of the KNVB Cup. The following season, Larsson won his second winner's medal in the same tournament when Feyenoord won 2–1 against Volendam. He did record a hat-trick in a 4–3 win against Werder Bremen in the UEFA Cup Winners' Cup in 1994–95.

In 1997, Larsson told manager Arie Haan that he wished to leave the club. A legal dispute then ensued over a clause in his contract that Larsson claimed would allow him to be sold on if a fee of £600,000 was offered. Larsson won his case and in July 1997, he signed for Scottish side Celtic.

=== Celtic ===
==== 1997–2000 ====
Following the contract dispute with Feyenoord, Larsson was signed by Celtic manager Wim Jansen in July 1997 for a fee of £650,000. In his first season at Celtic, he played the role of supporting forward alongside Darren Jackson, Simon Donnelly and later Harald Brattbakk.

On Larsson's Celtic debut, against Hibernian at Easter Road, he came on as a late substitute. He inadvertently passed the ball to Hibernian player Chic Charnley, who scored, resulting in a 2–1 defeat for Celtic. He scored an own goal in his first home European game, although Celtic did go on to win 6–3 against Austrian side Tirol Innsbruck. He went on to score 19 goals in all competitions, and was Celtic's top scorer for the season. In November 1997, Larsson won his first medal for the club after a 3–0 win over Dundee United at Ibrox Stadium gave Celtic the Scottish League Cup. Larsson scored Celtic's second goal in the match. On the final day of the league season, he scored the opener with a powerful shot from 20 yards out in a 2–0 win against St Johnstone to clinch the championship for Celtic. It was the club's first league championship win since the double-winning 1987–88 season and stopped Old Firm rivals Rangers from breaking Celtic's record of nine titles in a row. He finished fourth in the voting for the SFWA Footballer of the Year in 1998.

Larsson's second season with the club saw a change in management with Jozef Vengloš taking over following Jansen's resignation. Playing in a more advanced striker's role, Larsson scored 38 goals to end the season as both Celtic and Scottish football's top goalscorer. During the season, Larsson also scored for the first time in an Old Firm match, with two goals in a 5–1 victory in November, and the equaliser in the 2–2 New Year's Day match at Ibrox. Throughout the season, Larsson forged a prolific partnership with diminutive Slovak playmaker Ľubomír Moravčík. He was also awarded the honours of SPFA Players' Player of the Year, SFWA Footballer of the Year and Swedish Footballer of the Year. In 1998–99, Celtic finished runners-up to rivals Rangers in both the newly established Scottish Premier League (SPL) and the Scottish Cup.

The 1999–2000 season saw another change in management for Celtic. Former Liverpool and England international winger John Barnes replaced Vengloš to become manager at the club. Larsson scored eight league goals in his nine games for the club. During Celtic's 1–0 defeat in a UEFA Cup tie against Lyon on 21 October 1999, Larsson suffered a career-threatening injury, breaking his leg in two places in a challenge with Serge Blanc. This resulted in him spending eight months on the sidelines, only returning on the last day of the 1999–2000 season. John Barnes cited Larsson's injury as being a significant factor in his sacking by Celtic after only months in the position. It was initially feared that Larsson had suffered a compound leg fracture, an injury which would normally result in an even longer absence―or possibly even end his career―but X-rays soon revealed that the injury was not as serious as originally feared. Larsson made a brief return in March and scored three goals in two under-21 matches, but a sustained injury to his left shin in a third match meant he missed the 2000 Scottish League Cup Final. By the time Larsson had completed his full rehabilitation, Barnes had been sacked and replaced by director of football Kenny Dalglish as interim manager. Larsson made his comeback with a substitute appearance against Dundee United at Celtic Park on the final day of the SPL season.

==== 2000–03 ====
Following the arrival of Martin O'Neill in the summer of 2000, Larsson had his most successful season for Celtic. He began a partnership with new arrival Chris Sutton, scoring 35 league goals in 38 league games to become SPL top goalscorer and to win the European Golden Shoe. The season saw Celtic win the domestic treble of the Scottish League Cup, Scottish Cup and the SPL. He scored a hat-trick in a 3–0 win over Kilmarnock at Hampden Park to win the Scottish League Cup, the first non-Scottish player to do so in a cup final in Scotland. He also scored twice in the Scottish Cup in a 3–0 win over Hibernian. Other highlights for Larsson included two goals against Rangers in the 6–2 win at Parkhead early in the season, breaking Charlie Nicholas' post-war club record of 48 goals (in all competitions) in a season, with a brace against Dundee United in the Scottish Cup semi finals, equalling Brian McClair's post-war club record of 35 league goals in season with a goal in a 5–2 defeat of Hibs, and scoring his 50th goal of the season against Rangers at Ibrox in a 3–0 victory towards the end of the season and finishing the season with a total of 53 goals in all competitions. He was again voted SPFA Players' Player of the Year, as well as SFWA Footballer of the Year and FourFourTwo Scottish Player of the Year.

Rangers manager Dick Advocaat said "Larsson is one of the best strikers in Europe, maybe the world. If you watch [Gabriel] Batistuta, he is sometimes not seen for 90 minutes but he scores two goals. Larsson has even more, because, besides being a good player and goalscorer, he has a tremendous work rate."

Larsson's fifth season at Celtic yielded a second-consecutive SPL title for the club. It also marked the club's first foray into the UEFA Champions League group stage. Larsson scored his first Champions League goal with a penalty in Celtic's opening fixture in a 3–2 defeat to Juventus in Turin. He scored again for Celtic in their Champions League campaign with the only goal in a 1–0 victory over Porto, and again from the penalty spot against Juventus in a 4–3 victory at Celtic Park. Despite achieving a Scottish record of nine points in the group stage, Celtic failed to qualify for the latter stages and dropped into the UEFA Cup. The club were drawn against Valencia, with Larsson scoring the second-leg goal to take the tie into penalties which Celtic eventually lost. Larsson once again ended the season as SPL top goalscorer with 29 goals from 33 league appearances.

The 2002–03 season saw the club reach the 2003 UEFA Cup Final. After losing out on a place in the Champions League following an away goals defeat to Basel, Celtic again dropped into the UEFA Cup. In the first round, they were paired with Lithuanian side Sūduva, with Larsson scoring a hat-trick in the 8–1 first leg victory, as they progressed 10–1 on aggregate after adding a 2–0 away win. The second round saw former Rangers player-manager Graeme Souness's Blackburn Rovers side visit Celtic Park in a match dubbed "The Battle of Britain". Celtic went into the second leg at Ewood Park 1–0 up courtesy of a late Larsson goal. His winning goal (his 22nd European goal for Celtic) meant he became the all-time top scorer for a Scottish club in European competition. Larsson scored the opening goal in a 2–0 away win. The following rounds saw Celtic beat Celta Vigo 2–2 on away goals, and VfB Stuttgart 5–4 on aggregate. Larsson missed both ties with Stuttgart, following a broken jaw, after a collision with Gustave Bahoken in an SPL match against Livingston, but he returned from injury in time for Celtic's quarter-final clash with 2001 winners Liverpool. Larsson scored the opener in a 1–1 draw at Celtic Park. Celtic followed that up with a 2–0 victory at Anfield to win the tie 3–1 on aggregate,

Celtic met Portuguese side Boavista in the semi-final. Boavista took the advantage on away goals after a 1–1 draw in the first leg, in which Larsson scored the equaliser after missing a penalty. In the second leg, Larsson struck for Celtic after a one-two with John Hartson with ten minutes remaining. The goal sent Celtic through to their first European final since 1970. The final in Seville against Porto saw Larsson equalise twice with two headers, although Celtic eventually lost 3–2 after extra time. Larsson also finished runner-up to Porto's Derlei in the competition's goalscoring charts. Larsson described the pain of the defeat as being the worst moment of his career, including his broken leg in 1999. Celtic finished runners-up to Rangers on the last day of the SPL season, by only a single goal-difference. 2003 also saw Larsson voted as the Greatest Swedish Footballer of the Last 50 Years as part of the UEFA Jubilee Awards. He also finished the season again the top SPL goalscorer with 28 goals from 35 games.

Larsson was nominated for both the Ballon d'Or and UEFA Team of the Year in 2001, and again in 2003. He placed 14th (2001) and 12th (2003) for the Ballon d'Or. He finished runner-up for the SFWA Footballer of the Year in 2003 as well.

==== 2003–04 ====
Larsson's seventh and final season for Celtic saw the club win the Scottish Premier League and Scottish Cup titles.

He broke the record for European goals with the same British club (shared by Ian Rush and Peter Lorimer) after scoring his 31st European goal for Celtic in a Champions League qualifier against MTK Hungaria. Larsson scored his only Champions League goal of the season against Anderlecht in a 3–1 win at Celtic Park. He added to his European goal tally with a double in a 3–0 UEFA Cup third round victory over Teplice, and the equaliser in a first leg quarter-final tie at Celtic Park against Villarreal, after earlier having a goal disallowed for handball; the match ended 1–1. It was Larsson's final European goal for Celtic. After dropping out of the Champions League, Celtic reached the UEFA Cup quarter-finals, eliminating Barcelona en route, before losing 3–1 on aggregate to Villarreal. In March 2004, Larsson equalled Bobby Lennox's post-war record of 167 league goals and went level with Stevie Chalmers' 231 goals for the club with strike in 2–1 win over Dundee.

Celtic defeated Rangers in all five Old Firm fixtures that season. Larsson's final goal against Rangers came in a 1–0 Scottish Cup win at Parkhead. His final competitive game at home for Celtic came in a league match against Dundee United on 16 May 2004, and he scored both goals as Celtic won 2–1. In his last competitive appearance for Celtic, he scored two goals to defeat Dunfermline Athletic on 22 May 2004 at Hampden and win the 2004 Scottish Cup Final.

Larsson was also voted Swedish Footballer of the Year for the second time for his performances throughout the 2003–04 season. He was also again a nominee for the Ballon d'Or but received no votes.

After leaving Celtic, Larsson returned to play in testimonial matches three times. In May 2005, he played in Jackie McNamara's testimonial against the Republic of Ireland. In May 2008, Larsson left Sweden's national training camp early to take part in a match played in memory of Larsson's former teammate Phil O'Donnell, who had died in December 2007 while playing in a match for Motherwell. Larsson played as part of Celtic's 1998 championship-winning side against the Motherwell 1991 Scottish Cup-winning side. On 9 August 2011, he played for the Celtic Legends against the Manchester United Legends for John Kennedy's testimonial He has since returned to play in a further three charity matches at Celtic Park. He played for a Celtic XI against a Petrov XI in 2013, for Henrik's Heroes against Lubo's Legends in 2017, and for a Petrov XI against Milner XI in 2018.

==== Legacy ====
In his seven years at Celtic, Larsson won four SPL titles, two Scottish League Cups and two Scottish Cups. He was the top goalscorer in the Scottish Premier League for five of the six seasons that he competed in, the only exception being the 1999–2000 season, most of which Larsson missed due to a broken leg. He was the SPL (1998–2013) record goalscorer with 158 goals (Kris Boyd broke his record in 2009).

As of 2025, Larsson has scored the third-most-goals in Celtic's history (only Jimmy McGrory and Bobby Lennox scored more), which includes fifteen hat-tricks. Larsson was also a consistent goalscorer in European competition. With 35 goals, he is the record goalscorer for Celtic in UEFA competitions. Celtic fans selected Larsson (the only player from outside Scotland) in the club's greatest-ever team in 2002 vote.

Larsson played a testimonial match on 25 May 2004 against Sevilla in front of a capacity crowd at Celtic Park. In all, he scored 242 goals for Celtic in 313 matches, and his performances earned him the nickname The King of Kings from fans.

=== Barcelona ===
At the end of the 2003–04 season, Larsson left Celtic on a free transfer and signed a one-year contract with Barcelona with an option for a second year. Larsson's contribution in Barça's La Liga win in his first season there was disrupted by serious injury. He scored three goals in 12 Liga games and one goal (against his former club Celtic) in four Champions League matches. On 20 November 2004, during the 3–0 victory in El Clásico against Real Madrid, Larsson tore the anterior cruciate ligament (ACL) and meniscus in his left knee. Despite his injury-hit 2004–05 season, in which he played 16 games, Barcelona took the option to extend his contract.

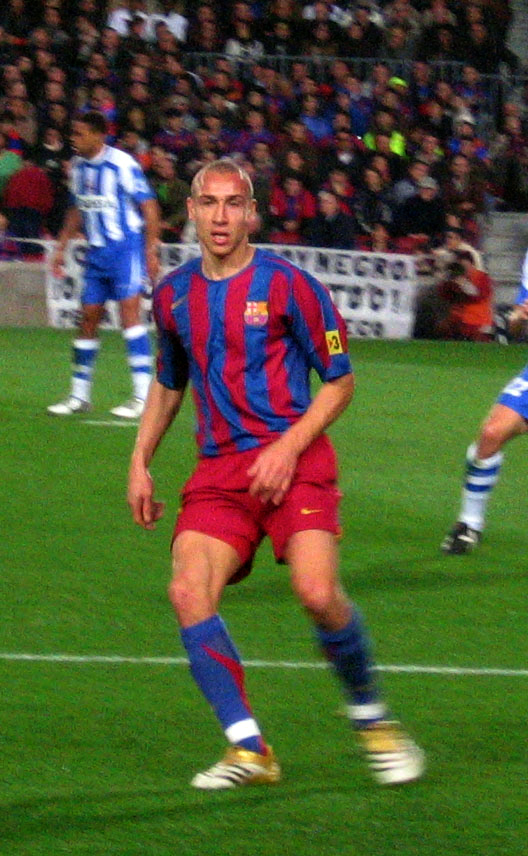
Larsson playing for Barcelona against Deportivo in 2006

In December 2005, Larsson announced that at the end of his contract, which ended in July, he would leave Barcelona and return to Sweden to end his career. He revealed that he had refused an offer by club president Joan Laporta to extend his contract to the end of the next season. On the announcement of his departure, Ronaldinho said:

"With Henrik leaving us at the end of the season this club is losing a great scorer, no question. But I am also losing a great friend. Henrik was my idol and now that I am playing next to him it is fantastic".

In Larsson's final match for Barcelona, his substitute introduction was pivotal to win the 2006 Champions League final. Larsson assisted both of Barcelona's goals in a 2–1 win over Arsenal. Thierry Henry paid tribute to Larsson's contribution to Barcelona's win after the match, saying, "People always talk about Ronaldinho, Samuel Eto'o, Ludovic Giuly and everything, but I didn't see them today, I saw Henrik Larsson. He came on, he changed the game, that is what killed the game. Sometimes you talk about Ronaldinho and Eto'o and people like that; you need to talk about the proper footballer who made the difference, and that was Henrik Larsson tonight." Indeed, his ability to give Barcelona the cutting edge required to overcome Arsenal was noted by the international press. In 2005–06, Larsson scored ten goals as Barcelona won La Liga for a second consecutive year.

In his time at the Camp Nou, Larsson’s shirt was the third-most-popular at Barcelona’s club shop. Only Ronaldinho and Eto’o shirts outsold his. Larsson was again shortlisted for UEFA Team of the Year in 2006 for his performances.

=== Return to Helsingborg ===
After Sweden's elimination from the 2006 FIFA World Cup on 24 June 2006, Larsson joined up with his former club, Helsingborg. He made his second debut for his home town club against Hammarby in the Swedish Cup on 6 July 2006. Helsingborg went on to win the competition, defeating Gefle 2–0 in the final on 11 November 2006, earning Larsson another medal. Larsson's eight league goals in 15 appearances also helped his team to a fourth-place finish in the Allsvenskan. This successful season earned Helsingborg a slot in the following season's UEFA Cup.

He registered two goals and two assists in three Royal League matches just before leaving on loan.

==== Loan to Manchester United ====
Shortly after rejoining Helsingborg, Larsson was signed on loan by Manchester United from 1 January until 12 March 2007, coinciding with the Allsvenskan's off-season. He scored on his debut against Aston Villa in the FA Cup third round on 7 January 2007 at Old Trafford, facing his former Celtic manager Martin O'Neill. Larsson scored his first Premier League goal on 31 January in a 4–0 win over Watford.

While United were eager to extend the loan deal, Larsson stated that he had made a promise to his family and his club to return on 12 March. This was confirmed on 20 February, when Larsson announced that he would not be extending his loan period. Despite this, Alex Ferguson praised the striker, who scored three goals in 13 matches in all competitions during his three-month stay, saying, "He's been fantastic for us, his professionalism, his attitude, everything he's done has been excellent." "We would love him to stay but, obviously, he has made his promise to his family and Helsingborg and I think we should respect that – but I would have done anything to keep him." Larsson scored Manchester United's only goal in their win against Lille at Old Trafford in the Champions League. He made his final appearance for United on 10 March in an FA Cup sixth-round tie away to Middlesbrough, ending in a 2–2 draw.

Manchester United won the 2006–07 Premier League two months after Larsson had left the club, Larsson had not played the required quota of ten league games to qualify for a Premier League winners medal. Despite media reports to the contrary, Larsson stated in 2019 that he did not receive a medal.

Larsson's next appearance at Old Trafford in fact came against United, the day after his loan with the club expired, as captain for the Europe XI team in the UEFA Celebration Match. Larsson received a standing ovation from the home fans upon being substituted for Liverpool player Robbie Fowler.

==== 2007–09 ====
After leaving Manchester United in March 2007, Larsson resumed his career with Helsingborg. Larsson helped the club through the preliminary stages of the UEFA Cup, where Larsson scored twice against Estonian side Narva Trans and once against League of Ireland side Drogheda United. The first-round proper of the UEFA Cup that season saw a high-scoring tie between Helsingborg and Heerenveen, Larsson's side lost 5–3 in the Netherlands on 20 September 2007, with Larsson scoring twice. The return leg in Sweden on 4 October 2007 saw Helsingborg win 5–1, Larsson again scoring, to win the tie 8–6 on aggregate and qualify for the group stage. Helsingborg progressed from the group stage, with Larsson scoring against Panionios, Austria Wien and Bordeaux, and they qualified for the round of 32, where they lost 1–4 on aggregate to PSV in February 2008. Helsingborg could not match their league performances of the previous year, and finished in eight place in Allsvenskan in 2007. Helsingborg also failed to retain the Swedish Cup, losing 2–1 to BoIS in the fourth round in June 2007.

The 2008 Allsvenskan saw Larsson produce his best league goal-scoring tally since returning to Sweden, with his 14 goals helping Helsingborg to fourth place and qualification in 2009–10 for the rebranded UEFA Europa League, formerly the UEFA Cup.

In July 2009, Larsson scored three goals in the Europa League qualifying ties against Eastern European minnows Mika and Zestaponi. He broke his knee-cap during the first leg of the next qualifying round against Sarajevo on 30 July 2009, and was out for an estimated eight weeks. Some reports at the time suggested that this was the end of his playing career, with this injury also coming on top of the recent death of his younger brother, Robert. He returned to the first team on 16 September 2009, appearing as a substitute in a 3–1 defeat against IFK Göteborg in the Swedish Cup, and then on 24 September 2009 in his first start since returning from injury, he scored two goals (including the winner) against league rivals AIK. He is Helsingborg's record goalscorer in UEFA competitions with 12 goals.

On 20 October 2009, Larsson announced his retirement from playing at the end of the 2009 Allsvenskan. The announcement followed a previous statement from the player declaring his intention to retire from international duty. Larsson had also stated his desire to move into coaching and expressed his intent to study for coaching qualifications in Scotland under the Scottish Football Association system. Larsson also discussed the possibility of taking up floorball on a full-time basis.

Larsson took to the pitch for the final time in Helsingborg's 2–0 Allsvenskan loss to Djurgården on 28 October 2009, and was given a standing ovation from the crowd.

As of his retirement, he remains the Swedish player with the most goals scored (59) in UEFA competitions (Zlatan Ibrahimovic is next on 57).

=== Playing activity after retirement ===
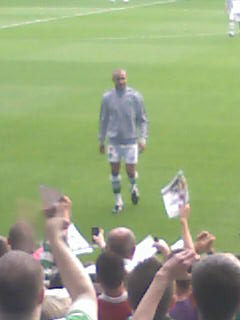
Larsson before a testimonial match for John Kennedy in 2011

Larsson participated in the Soccer Aid football match at Old Trafford on 6 June 2010 for the Rest of the World team in aid of UNICEF. Larsson made a promise that at the end of his football career, he would play one season at his first club, Högaborg. When he retired at the end of the 2009 season, that promise was not fulfilled. In August 2010, however, Larsson played with Högaborg's veterans team and scored 16 goals in five matches.

In August 2012, Larsson came out of retirement for a brief spell at Swedish fifth division (Division 3) side Råå. He made one appearance, coming on as a substitute in a league match on 22 September 2012, a 1–1 draw against Höganäs. Larsson then registered as a player with Högaborg's senior recreational side and played games with them. Due to the many injuries, Larsson was included in the first-team squad that beat Tenhult with 4–2 on 19 June 2013. He came off the bench in the 85th minute, and played alongside his son, Jordan. At age 42, Larsson took part in a further league match for Högaborg on 26 October 2013, when he played the first 66 minutes in a 2–0 win over IF Haga. At age 44, Larsson took part in a 7–1 friendly win for Helsingborg over IFK Malmö, in which he scored in the 89th minute.

== International career ==
Larsson scored 37 goals in 106 matches for the Sweden national team. He scored his first international goal in his debut on 13 October 1993, during the FIFA World Cup qualifications stage, in a 3–2 win against Finland.

=== 1994 FIFA World Cup ===
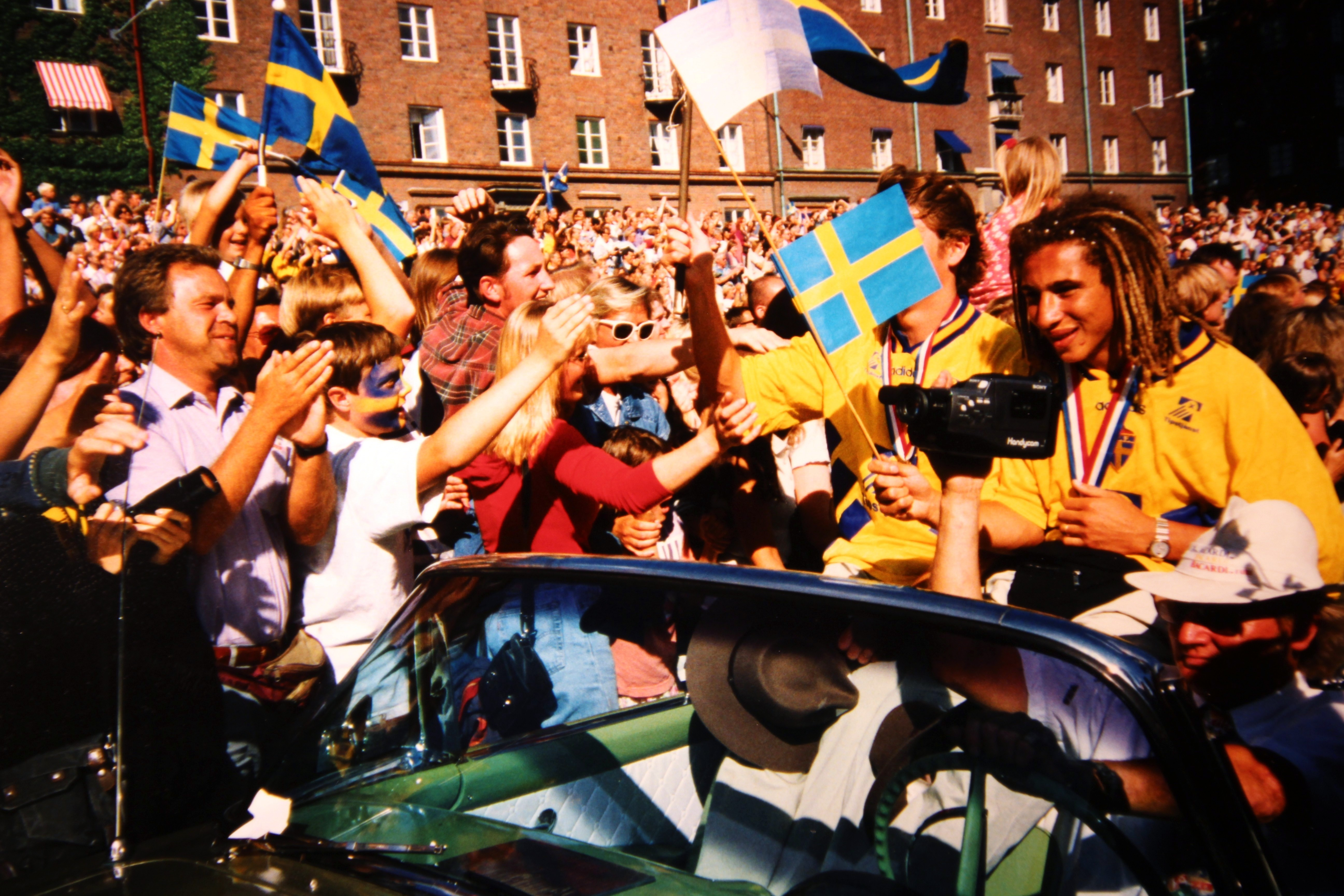
Larsson and his teammates being greeted by Swedish fans in Stockholm after the 1994 FIFA World Cup

Sweden manager Tommy Svensson selected Larsson for his 22-man squad for the 1994 FIFA World Cup squad, alongside established forwards such as Tomas Brolin, Kennet Andersson and Martin Dahlin. Larsson began Sweden's first game of the tournament, against Cameroon, on the bench, but came on as a substitute with Sweden trailing 1–2. Larsson struck a fierce, long-range shot against the crossbar, with Dahlin reacting quickly to score the rebound to give their country a 2–2 draw. He again came on as a late substitute in the following game against Russia, and then played from the start in the final game of the group against Brazil. He was not used in the last 16 game against Saudi Arabia, but came on a substitute in the quarter-final tie against Romania. The match finished 2–2 after extra time, with Sweden winning on penalties, one of which was scored by Larsson. Larsson did not feature in Sweden's 1–0 defeat against Brazil in the semi-final, but did play in the third-place play-off against Bulgaria which Sweden won 4–0, including Larsson's first World Cup goal, latching onto a through-ball from Brolin before rounding Bulgarian goalkeeper Borislav Mihaylov and wrong-footing defender Trifon Ivanov. That win secured third-place at the 1994 FIFA World Cup for Sweden, their best showing in a tournament since finishing runner-up to Brazil in 1958.

=== Euro 1996 and 1998 FIFA World Cup qualifiers ===
Larsson became a regular in the side after that, playing in six of his country's qualifiers for Euro 1996. He did not score in any of these matches and Sweden failed to qualify for the finals.

He scored one goal in four qualifying games as Sweden also failed to qualify for the 1998 FIFA World Cup.

=== Euro 2000 ===
Sweden finally succeeded in qualifying for Euro 2000, with Larsson ending up scoring three goals during these qualifying matches. He was selected for the Sweden squad despite having only just recovered from a broken leg sustained playing for Celtic. Euro 2000 was not a great success for Sweden, who went out at the first group stage, but Larsson scored against Italy in a 1–2 defeat.

=== 2002 FIFA World Cup and first retirement ===
Sweden reappeared on the global stage two years later at the 2002 FIFA World Cup. Larsson helped guide Sweden out of the group of death and into the knockout round with a 2–1 win over Nigeria in which he scored both goals. He then scored in the round of 16 match against Senegal, though Sweden ended up losing 1–2 in extra time to a golden goal and were eliminated. Larsson chose to retire from international football after the World Cup.

=== Euro 2004 ===
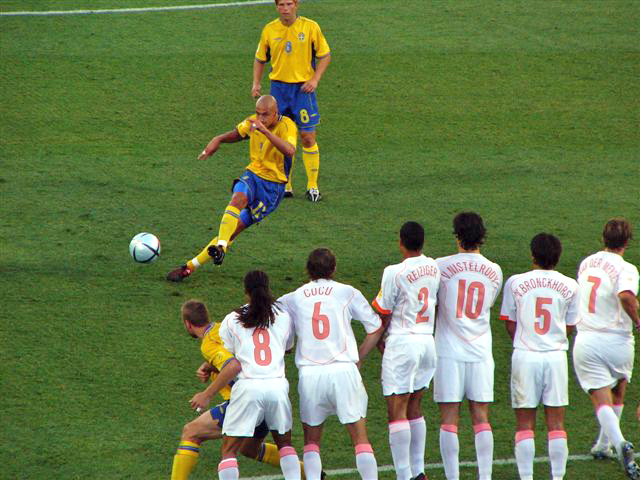
Larsson taking a free kick for Sweden against the Netherlands at Euro 2004

Larsson's decision to retire from international football was met with dismay in Sweden and there was much clamoring for him to return to the team for their campaign at Euro 2004 in Portugal. Despite initially maintaining his decision to retire, he eventually agreed to return to the national side for Euro 2004. Playing up front alongside Zlatan Ibrahimović, Larsson scored three goals in four matches and lead Sweden to the quarter-finals, where they were defeated in a penalty shoot-out by the Netherlands. Larsson's diving header against Bulgaria was voted best goal of the tournament.

=== 2006 FIFA World Cup and second retirement ===
Larsson also featured at the 2006 FIFA World Cup in Germany. He scored in the final minute of the match against England for Sweden to draw the match 2–2 in their final match in the group stages. The goal sealed Sweden's qualification for the second round of the tournament. In Sweden's last 16 game against hosts Germany, Larsson missed a penalty and Sweden went out with the score at 2–0 to Germany.

He retired from international football for the second time on 17 July 2006. "It is time to quit now. It feels right. I'm done with the national team", the 34-year-old Larsson told TV station Canal Plus.

=== Euro 2008 ===
Sweden boss Lars Lagerbäck managed to lure Larsson out of international retirement once more and on 13 May 2008, the Swedish Football Association officially declared that Larsson had agreed to make a comeback and play for Sweden once again at Euro 2008. Larsson assisted Zlatan Ibrahimovic for a goal against Greece in the first group stage game, but could not help Sweden advance to the quarter-finals.

=== 2010 FIFA World Cup qualifying and final retirement ===
Following former team captain Freddie Ljungberg's decision to quit the national side after the tournament, Larsson was chosen to become the new captain in a friendly match against France on 20 August 2008, He scored his 37th goal for Sweden in that match, although France ended up winning 3–2. He played his 100th game for Sweden on 6 September 2008, in a 2010 FIFA World Cup qualifier against Albania, which ended in a 0–0 draw.

On 11 October 2009, after it was clear that Sweden had failed to qualify for the 2010 FIFA World Cup, Larsson once again decided to retire from the national team. At the age of 38 years and 20 days, Larsson became the oldest outfield player in the history of the Sweden national team with his last ever appearance against Denmark on 10 October 2009. Since then, Zlatan Ibrahimović has become Sweden's oldest outfield player.

== Managerial career ==
Larsson made clear his intentions to take up coaching once his playing career came to an end, having also expressed an interest in returning to Celtic in a coaching capacity.

=== Landskrona BoIS ===
On 14 December 2009 Larsson was appointed manager at Landskrona BoIS, a Swedish second division football club, on a one-year contract. The news that Larsson would take over Landskrona was received with mixed feelings, as his former club Helsingborg traditionally were their main rivals. The 2010 Superettan, the first season for Larsson as a manager, started off positively for Landskrona. With an aggressively attacking 4–3–3 formation Larsson's club lined up victories and fought for the top positions and promotion to Allsvenskan, until the very end of the season. They finished in fifth place. The Landskrona BoIS board was satisfied with the results, and both Larsson and his assistant manager Hans Eklund renewed their contracts for another year. On 23 March 2011, Landskrona BoIS announced the recruitment of the Sweden national team qualified midfielder Marcus Lantz from Helsingborg, a solicitation that was largely thanks to Larsson. With the recruitment of Lantz, Henrik Larsson announced a major effort to make the club win Superettan and be promoted to Allsvenskan, from which they were relegated in 2005.

Before the 2011 Superettan season, the managers of the other Superettan clubs had tipped Landskrona as the likely champion. But the season was about to become the club's worst in years. Instead of being in the top of the table, Landskrona was stuck at the bottom more than halfway into the season, with relegation looming. Some fans protested against both the board and Henrik Larsson, sarcastically suggesting that the club had used an impostor instead of the real Larsson. The crisis went so deep within the association that the board wanted Larsson himself to make a comeback as a player. Larsson played for 20 minutes with Landskrona's reserve team in a match against Mjällby AIF, but felt physically unprepared for playing in Superettan, even if the sporting director of Landskrona, Mats Aronsson, believed the opposite. Landskrona and Larsson avoided relegation and finished tenth largely because of the summer signing of goalkeeper Ivo Vazgeč who achieved the best save percentage in the league.

On 21 November 2011, Larsson signed a new one-year contract, making him manager for Landskrona during the 2012 Superettan as well. Landskrona performed better in 2012, but only managed to finish in sixth place instead of achieving the third-place finish which would have meant qualification for a promotion play-off spot. In November 2012, Larsson confirmed he had left his position and would consider any available posts elsewhere.

=== Falkenberg ===
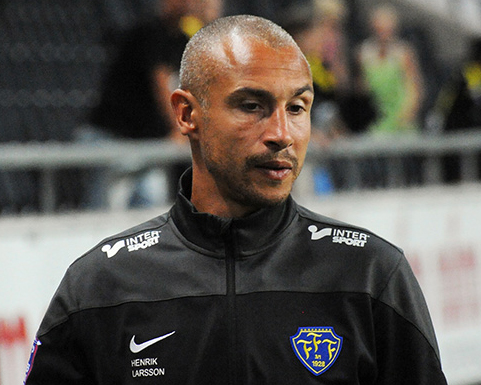
Larsson as manager of Falkenberg in 2014

On 4 December 2013, Larsson was appointed manager of Falkenberg, signing a one-year rolling contact with the newly promoted club. After securing Falkenberg's position in Allsvenskan, it was announced on 10 November 2014 that he would not manage the club for the 2015 season.

=== Helsingborg ===
After leaving Falkenberg, Larsson was appointed manager of Helsingborg. In November 2016, Helsingborg were relegated to Superettan after losing a two-legged play-off against Halmstad. After the final whistle, a minor group of disappointed home fans attacked both Larsson and his son, Jordan. Following the end of the season, Larsson decided to leave the club.

=== Ängelholms FF ===
After turning down the opportunity to manage Scottish side Livingston, Division 1 club Ängelholms FF announced on 3 October 2018 that Larsson would join the staff as assistant to head coach Alexander Tengryd, whom Larsson had worked together with in Helsingborg. At the time of his appointment, Ängelholm were on 13 place and five matches in a row without a win with six matches left of the season. First match with Larsson in the staff was three days later against Utsiktens BK away. The match ended in a 1–0 win for Ängelholm. Ängelholm would only take two points in their last five matches, including losing 0–4 to Oskarshamns AIK and 0–3 to Tvååker, and dropped to 15th place which meant immediate relegation. Larsson, along with head coach Alexander Tengryd, left the club at the end of the season.

=== Return to Helsingborgs IF ===
On 16 June 2019, Helsingborg announced that Larsson had returned to the club as their new manager.

On 23 August 2019, Helsingborg announced that Larsson had decided to quit as head coach after being verbally assaulted on social media following the club's loss to third tier club Oskarshamns AIK in the qualification to Svenska Cupen group stage.

In September 2019 he began talks with English club Southend United about becoming their manager, but these collapsed when proposed assistant Tommy Johnson accepted another offer.

=== Barcelona ===
On 21 August 2020, FC Barcelona announced that Larsson and Alfred Schreuder had joined new head coach Ronald Koeman‘s coaching staff until 30 June 2022. On 27 October 2021, the club confirmed Koeman had been relieved of his duties, which resulted in the departure of Larsson from FC Barcelona's coaching staff.

== Floorball career ==
Larsson also played floorball at a competitive level in 1989. On 23 November 2008, he resumed his floorball career when he played his first Swedish Super League game for Helsingborg. In his second game for the club, he made two assists, and was voted man of the match.

== Style of play ==
A well-rounded striker, Larsson was known for his speed, goalscoring ability, composure, and intelligence on the pitch, as exemplified by his offensive movement and positional sense, which enabled him to lose his markers, find spaces in the defence, and make attacking runs into the penalty area. Although he was not particularly tall for a striker, he possessed significant physical strength and excelled in the air; he was also gifted with excellent technical skills, and was capable of providing assists to teammates in addition to scoring goals himself, courtesy of his passing, creativity, and awareness. Although naturally right footed, he was a powerful and accurate finisher with either foot from both inside and outside the penalty area, as well as his head; furthermore, he was an accurate free-kick and penalty taker. In addition to his abilities as a footballer, he also stood out for his discipline, professionalism, and work-rate throughout his career. (Note: See)

== Personal life ==
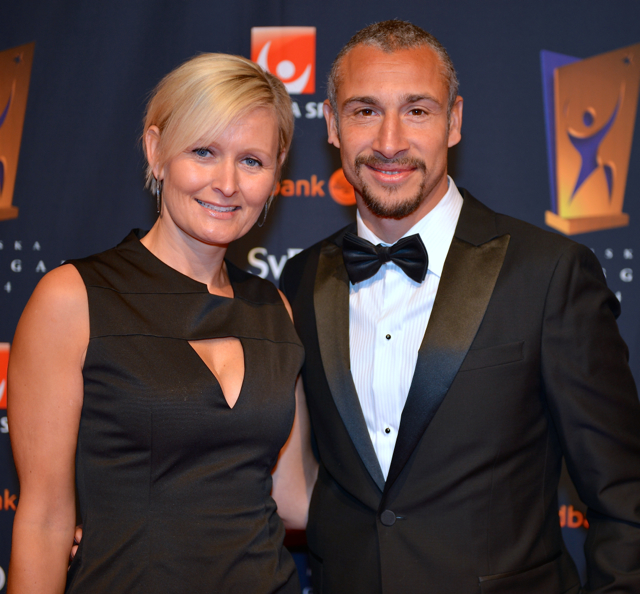
Larsson with his wife Magdalena at the Swedish Sports Awards in 2014

On 21 June 1996, Larsson married Magdalena Spjuth, whom he had met in a restaurant when he was 19 years old. She is the daughter of a politician and an education director at the local municipality. They have a son, professional footballer Jordan Larsson (born 1997 and named after basketball player Michael Jordan), who has represented Sweden at international level, and a daughter (born 2002), a show jumper as of 2026.

On 6 June 2009, before Sweden's 1–0 loss against Denmark, Larsson's younger brother Robert, who had a troubled personal life, was found dead in his flat in their hometown of Helsingborg. Henrik was not told until after the match had concluded. Henrik Larsson also has an elder half-brother.

== Career statistics ==
=== Club ===
Appearances and goals by club, season and competition
Club	Season	League			National cup		League cup		Europe		Other (Note: Includes goals and appearances in the 1994 and 1995 Dutch Supercup, 2005 Supercopa de España, 2007 Svenska Supercupen, 2006–07 Royal League, and 2004–05 and 2005–06 Copa Catalunya)		Total	
Club	Season	Division	Apps	Goals	Apps	Goals	Apps	Goals	Apps	Goals	Apps	Goals	Apps	Goals
Högaborg	1989	Division 3 Södra Götaland	21	1	–		–		–		–		21	1
Högaborg	1990	Division 3 Södra Götaland	21	7	–		–		–		–		21	7
Högaborg	1991	Division 3 Södra Götaland	22	15	–		–		–		–		22	15
Högaborg	Total		64	23	–		–		–		–		64	23
Helsingborg	1992	Division 1 Södra	31	34	–		–		–		–		31	34
Helsingborg	1993	Allsvenskan	25	16	5	1	–		–		–		30	17
Helsingborg	Total		56	50	5	1	–		–		–		61	51
Feyenoord	1993–94	Eredivisie	15	1	12	5	–		–		–		27	6
Feyenoord	1994–95	Eredivisie	23	8	9	1	–		6	7	1	0	39	16
Feyenoord	1995–96	Eredivisie	32	10	4	1	–		7	1	1	1	44	13
Feyenoord	1996–97	Eredivisie	31	7	4	0	–		6	1	–		41	8
Feyenoord	Total		101	26	29	7	–		19	9	2	1	151	43
Celtic	1997–98	Scottish Premier Division	35	16	4	0	5	3	2	0	–		46	19
Celtic	1998–99	Scottish Premier League	35	29	5	5	0	0	8	4	–		48	38
Celtic	1999–2000	Scottish Premier League	9	7	0	0	0	0	4	5	–		13	12
Celtic	2000–01	Scottish Premier League	37	35	6	9	2	5	5	4	–		50	53
Celtic	2001–02	Scottish Premier League	33	29	3	2	1	0	10	4	–		47	35
Celtic	2002–03	Scottish Premier League	35	28	2	2	2	2	12	12	–		51	44
Celtic	2003–04	Scottish Premier League	37	30	5	5	1	0	15	6	–		58	41
Celtic	Total		221	174	25	23	11	10	56	35	–		313	242
Barcelona	2004–05	La Liga	12	3	1	0	–		4	1	2	1	19	5
Barcelona	2005–06	La Liga	28	10	4	4	–		10	1	2	2	44	17
Barcelona	Total		40	13	5	4	–		14	2	4	3	63	22
Helsingborg	2006	Allsvenskan	15	8	5	4	–		–		3	2	23	14
Helsingborg	2007	Allsvenskan	22	9	1	0	–		9	9	1	0	33	18
Helsingborg	2008	Allsvenskan	27	14	1	0	–		2	0	–		30	14
Helsingborg	2009	Allsvenskan	20	7	1	0	–		4	3	–		25	10
Helsingborg	Total		84	38	8	4	–		15	12	4	2	111	56
Manchester United (loan)	2006–07	Premier League	7	1	4	1	0	0	2	1	–		13	3
Råå	2012	Division 3 Östra Götaland	1	0	–		–		–		–		1	0
Högaborg	2013	Division 2 Västra Götaland	1	0	–		–		–		–		1	0
Career total			575	325	76	40	11	10	106	59	10	6	778	440

=== International ===
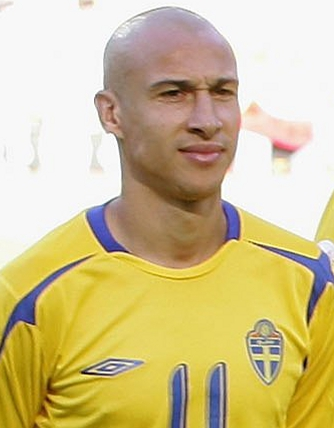
Larsson with Sweden at the 2006 FIFA World Cup

Appearances and goals by national team and year
National team	Year	Apps	Goals
Sweden U21	1992	5	4
Sweden U21	1993	7	0
Total		12	4
Sweden B	1997	1	0
Total		1	0
Sweden	1993	2	1
Sweden	1994	14	5
Sweden	1995	6	0
Sweden	1996	6	1
Sweden	1997	2	0
Sweden	1998	7	1
Sweden	1999	9	2
Sweden	2000	8	2
Sweden	2001	10	9
Sweden	2002	8	3
Sweden	2003	1	0
Sweden	2004	9	8
Sweden	2005	5	2
Sweden	2006	6	2
Sweden	2007	0	0
Sweden	2008	9	1
Sweden	2009	4	0
Total		106	37

Scores and results list Sweden's goal tally first, score column indicates score after each Larsson goal.

List of international goals scored by Henrik Larsson
No.	Date	Venue	Opponent	Score	Result	Competition	Ref.
1	13 October 1993	Råsunda Stadium, Stockholm, Sweden	Finland	2–1	3–2	1994 FIFA World Cup qualification	
2	20 February 1994	Joe Robbie Stadium, Miami Gardens, United States	United States	1–1	3–1	Friendly	
3	20 April 1994	Racecourse Ground, Wrexham, Wales	Wales	1–0	2–0	Friendly	
4	5 May 1994	Råsunda Stadium, Stockholm, Sweden	Nigeria	2–0	3–1	Friendly	
5	16 July 1994	Rose Bowl, Pasadena, United States	Bulgaria	3–0	4–0	1994 FIFA World Cup	
6	17 August 1994	Eyravallen, Örebro, Sweden	Lithuania	4–2	4–2	Friendly	
7	1 June 1996	Råsunda Stadium, Stockholm, Sweden	Belarus	5–1	5–1	1998 FIFA World Cup qualification	
8	14 October 1998	Lazur Stadium, Burgas, Bulgaria	Bulgaria	1–0	1–0	UEFA Euro 2000 qualifying	
9	27 March 1999	Ullevi, Gothenburg, Sweden	Luxembourg	2–0	2–0	UEFA Euro 2000 qualifying	
10	9 October 1999	Råsunda Stadium, Stockholm, Sweden	Poland	2–0	2–0	UEFA Euro 2000 qualifying	
11	19 June 2000	Philips Stadion, Eindhoven, Netherlands	Italy	1–1	1–2	UEFA Euro 2000	
12	7 October 2000	Ullevi, Gothenburg, Sweden	Turkey	1–0	1–1	2002 FIFA World Cup qualification	
13	28 February 2001	National Stadium, Ta' Qali, Malta	Malta	2–0	3–0	Friendly	
14	6 June 2001	Ullevi, Gothenburg, Sweden	Moldova	1–0	6–0	2002 FIFA World Cup qualification	
15	6 June 2001	Ullevi, Gothenburg, Sweden	Moldova	2–0	6–0	2002 FIFA World Cup qualification	
16	6 June 2001	Ullevi, Gothenburg, Sweden	Moldova	3–0	6–0	2002 FIFA World Cup qualification	
17	6 June 2001	Ullevi, Gothenburg, Sweden	Moldova	6–0	6–0	2002 FIFA World Cup qualification	
18	15 August 2001	Råsunda Stadium, Stockholm, Sweden	South Africa	1–0	3–0	Friendly	
19	1 September 2001	City Park, Skopje, Macedonia	Macedonia	1–0	2–1	2002 FIFA World Cup qualification	
20	5 September 2001	Ali Sami Yen Stadium, Istanbul, Turkey	Turkey	1–1	2–1	2002 FIFA World Cup qualification	
21	7 October 2001	Råsunda Stadium, Stockholm, Sweden	Azerbaijan	2–0	3–0	2002 FIFA World Cup qualification	
22	7 June 2002	Kobe Wing Stadium, Kobe, Japan	Nigeria	1–1	2–1	2002 FIFA World Cup	
23	7 June 2002	Kobe Wing Stadium, Kobe, Japan	Nigeria	2–1	2–1	2002 FIFA World Cup	
24	16 June 2002	Oita Stadium, Ōita, Japan	Senegal	1–0	1–2	2002 FIFA World Cup	
25	5 June 2004	Råsunda Stadium, Stockholm, Sweden	Poland	1–0	3–1	Friendly	
26	14 June 2004	Estádio José Alvalade, Lisbon, Portugal	Bulgaria	2–0	5–0	UEFA Euro 2004	
27	14 June 2004	Estádio José Alvalade, Lisbon, Portugal	Bulgaria	3–0	5–0	UEFA Euro 2004	
28	22 June 2004	Estádio do Bessa, Porto, Portugal	Denmark	1–1	2–2	UEFA Euro 2004	
29	4 September 2004	National Stadium, Ta' Qali, Malta	Malta	7–0	7–0	2006 FIFA World Cup qualification	
30	9 October 2004	Råsunda Stadium, Stockholm, Sweden	Hungary	2–0	3–0	2006 FIFA World Cup qualification	
31	13 October 2004	Laugardalsvöllur, Reykjavík, Iceland	Iceland	1–0	4–1	2006 FIFA World Cup qualification	
32	13 October 2004	Laugardalsvöllur, Reykjavík, Iceland	Iceland	3–0	4–1	2006 FIFA World Cup qualification	
33	17 August 2005	Ullevi, Gothenburg, Sweden	Czech Republic	1–0	2–1	Friendly	
34	12 October 2005	Råsunda Stadium, Stockholm, Sweden	Iceland	2–1	3–1	2006 FIFA World Cup qualification	
35	2 June 2006	Råsunda Stadium, Stockholm, Sweden	Chile	1–0	1–1	Friendly	
36	20 June 2006	RheinEnergieStadion, Cologne, Germany	England	2–2	2–2	2006 FIFA World Cup	
37	20 August 2008	Ullevi, Gothenburg, Sweden	France	1–0	2–3	Friendly	

=== Managerial statistics ===
As of 20 November 2016

Managerial record by team and tenure
Team	From	To	Record					
Team	From	To	G	W	D	L	Win %	Ref
Landskrona BoIS	14 December 2009	8 November 2012	94	38	19	37	40.43	
Falkenberg	4 December 2013	10 November 2014	31	9	6	16	29.03	
Helsingborg	1 January 2015	23 November 2016	68	22	12	34	32.35	
Total			193	69	37	87	35.75	

== Honours ==
Feyenoord

- KNVB Cup: 1993–94, 1994–95

Celtic

- Scottish Premier Division/Scottish Premier League: 1997–98, 2000–01, 2001–02, 2003–04
- Scottish Cup: 2000–01, 2003–04
- Scottish League Cup: 1997–98, 2000–01
- UEFA Cup runner-up: 2002–03

Barcelona

- La Liga: 2004–05, 2005–06
- Supercopa de España: 2005
- UEFA Champions League: 2005–06

Helsingborg

- Svenska Cupen: 2006
- Division 1 Södra promotion: 1992

Manchester United

- Premier League: 2006–07

Sweden

- FIFA World Cup third place: 1994

Individual

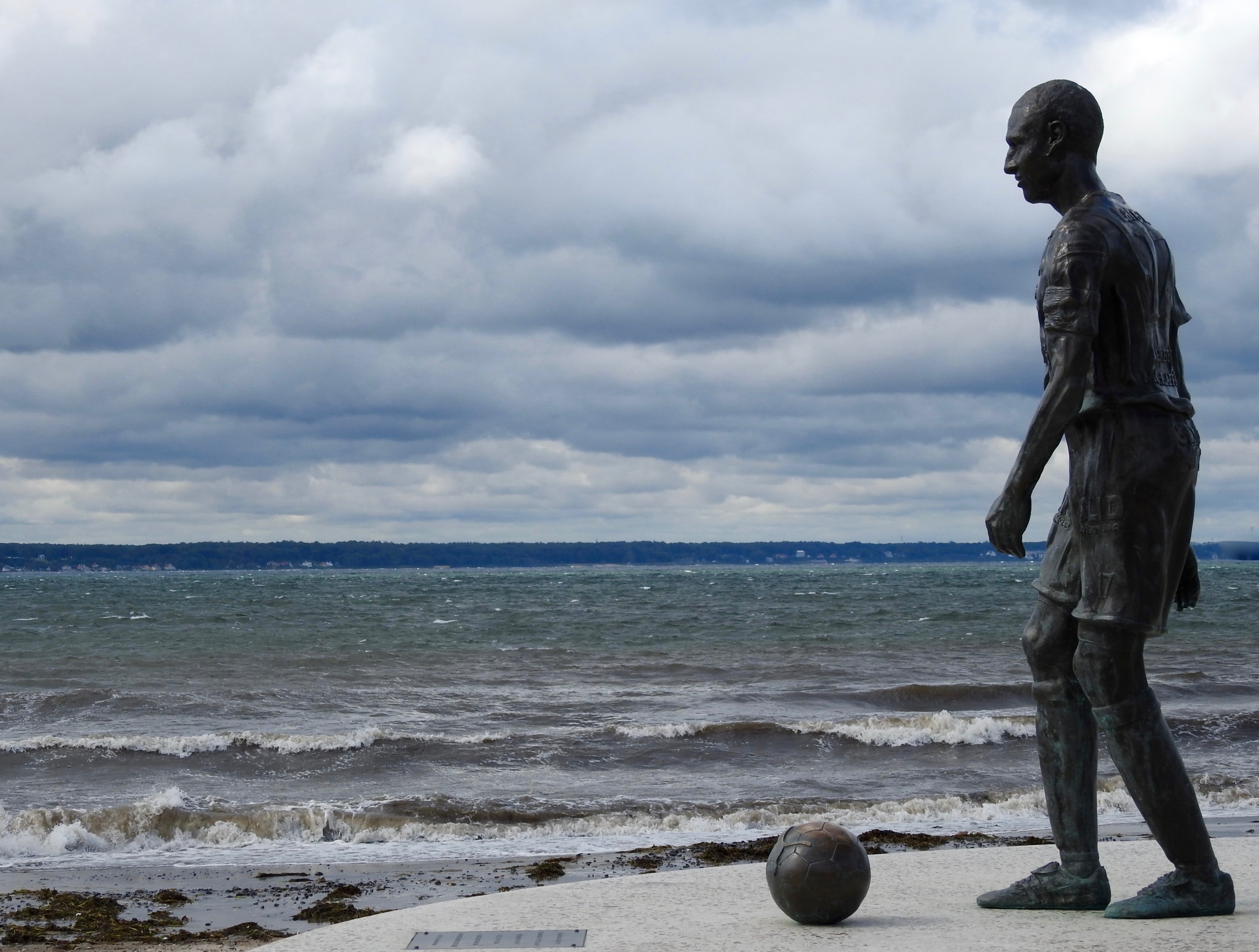
Statue of Larsson in his hometown Helsingborg

- Stor Grabb: 1994
- Guldbollen: 1998, 2004
- Swedish Forward of the Year: 2001, 2002, 2003, 2004
- Scottish Premier League Golden Boot: 1998–99, 2000–01, 2001–02, 2002–03, 2003–04
- BBC Scotland Sports Personality of the Year: 1998
- SFWA Footballer of the Year: 1999, 2001
- SPFA Players' Player of the Year: 1999, 2001
- Joe Robbie Cup Best Player: 1994
- Scottish Premier League Player of the Month: September 2000, November 2002
- Scottish Football League Player of the Month: September 1997
- European Golden Boot: 2001
- UEFA Euro 2004: Team of the Tournament
- UEFA Euro 2004: Goal of the Tournament
- UEFA Centurion Award (100 international caps): 2011
- Scottish Football Hall of Fame
- Swedish Football Hall of Fame
- Victoria Scholarship Award: 2007
- Tidernas Guldboll (All-time best Swedish football player): 2005

Orders and special awards

- UEFA Golden Player: Greatest Swedish Footballer of the last 50 Years (November 2003, to celebrate UEFA's Jubilee)
- Honorary Doctor of the university from the University of Strathclyde: 2005
- Honorary MBE (Member of the Order of the British Empire): 2006

== See also ==
- List of footballers with 100 or more caps
- List of FIFA World Cup top goalscorers
