= 2024–25 Falkirk F.C. season =

Falkirk
2024–25 season
- CEO: Jamie Swinney
- Manager: John McGlynn
- Stadium: Falkirk Stadium
- Championship: 1st (promoted)
- Scottish Cup: Fourth round
- League Cup: Quarter-finals
- Challenge Cup: Third round
- Stirlingshire Cup: Winners
- Top goalscorer: League: Calvin Miller (10); All: Calvin Miller (12)
- Highest home attendance: 7,633 vs. Hamilton Academical, Championship, 2 May 2025
- Lowest home attendance: 552 vs. Dumbarton, Stirlingshire Cup, 7 January 2025
- Average home league attendance: 6,445
Home colours	Away colours

The 2024–25 season was Falkirk's first season in Championship following their promotion from League One at the end of the 2023–24 season. Falkirk also competed in the League Cup, Challenge Cup, Scottish Cup and the re-introduced Stirlingshire Cup.

== Summary ==
On 31 May 2024, Falkirk announced their participation in the revived Stirlingshire Cup.

== Results and fixtures ==
=== Pre-season ===
29 June 2024	Dumbarton	2–3	Falkirk	Dumbarton
14:00	Hilton 6', 9'		Miller 32'; Nesbitt 67'; Allan 70'	Stadium: Dumbarton Football Stadium

6 July 2024	Falkirk	2–2	Alloa Athletic	Falkirk
14:00	Roberts 4'; Rankin 55'		MacIver 23', 65'	Stadium: Falkirk Stadium

=== Scottish Championship ===
2 August 2024 1	Falkirk	2–1	Queen’s Park	Falkirk
19:45	Miller 33'; Mackie 48'	Report	Thomas 46'	Stadium: Falkirk Stadium; Attendance: 5,505; Referee: Iain Snedden

10 August 2024 2	Dunfermline Athletic	0–2	Falkirk	Dunfermline
15:00		Report	MacIver 6'; Morrison 87' (pen.)	Stadium: East End Park; Attendance: 7,595

24 August 2024 3	Falkirk	2–1	Partick Thistle	Falkirk
15:00	Henderson 58'; Spencer 83'	Report	Stanway (red card) 25'; Ablade 76'	Stadium: Falkirk Stadium; Attendance: 6,502

31 August 2024 4	Greenock Morton	2–3	Falkirk	Greenock
15:00	Boyes 19'; Baird 26'	Report	Spencer 30' (pen.); Tait 42'; Agyeman 75'	Stadium: Cappielow; Attendance: 2,961; Referee: Graham Grainger

14 September 2024 5	Airdrieonians	0–2	Falkirk	Airdrie
15:00		Report	Tait 72'; Mackie 79'	Stadium: Excelsior Stadium; Attendance: 2,973; Referee: Dan McFarlane

28 September 2024 6	Raith Rovers	1–0	Falkirk	Kirkcaldy
15:00	Hamilton 11' (pen.)	Report		Stadium: Stark's Park; Attendance: 5,030; Referee: Matthew MacDermid

5 October 2024 7	Falkirk	2–0	Ayr United	Falkirk
15:00	Ross 8', 51'	Report		Stadium: Falkirk Stadium; Attendance: 6,753; Referee: Nick Walsh

8 October 2024 8	Falkirk	0–0	Livingston	Falkirk
19:45		Report		Stadium: Falkirk Stadium; Attendance: 5,715; Referee: Euan Anderson

12 October 2024 9	Partick Thistle	1–1	Falkirk	Glasgow
15:00	Graham 61'	Report	Ross 59'	Stadium: Firhill Stadium; Attendance: 4,762; Referee: Steven McLean

18 October 2024 10	Hamilton Academical	1–3	Falkirk	Hamilton
19:45	Henderson 47'	Report	Maguire 5' (o.g.); Miller 29'; Spencer 34'	Stadium: New Douglas Park; Attendance: 1,753; Referee: Matthew MacDermid

26 October 2024 11	Falkirk	2–1	Dunfermline Athletic	Falkirk
15:00	Hamilton 24' (o.g.); Miller 57'	Report	McCann 72'	Stadium: Falkirk Stadium; Attendance: 7,321; Referee: Chris Graham

2 November 2024 12	Falkirk	6–0	Greenock Morton	Falkirk
15:00	Adams 16'; Ross 37'; Spencer 46' (pen.), 82'; Oliver 52'; Miller 54'	Report		Stadium: Falkirk Stadium; Attendance: 5,708; Referee: David Dickinson

9 November 2024 13	Falkirk	2–0	Airdrieonians	Falkirk
15:00	Adams 33'; Miller 59'	Report		Stadium: Falkirk Stadium; Attendance: 6,008; Referee: Calum Scott

16 November 2024 14	Livingston	1–0	Falkirk	Livingston
15:00	Yengi 41'	Report		Stadium: Almondvale Stadium; Attendance: 3,745; Referee: Iain Snedden

22 November 2024 15	Queen's Park	0–1	Falkirk	Glasgow
19:45		Report	Nesbitt 26'	Stadium: Hampden Park; Attendance: 2,071; Referee: David Dickinson

7 December 2024 16	Falkirk	3–0	Raith Rovers	Falkirk
15:00	Agyeman 5', 57'; Adams 66'	Report		Stadium: Falkirk Stadium; Attendance: 6,248; Referee: Graham Grainger

14 December 2024 17	Ayr United	5–2	Falkirk	Ayr
15:00	McLennan 34'; Dempsey 38'; McMann 40'; Bavidge 60', 70'	Report	MacIver 2'; Graham (red card) 8'; Agyeman 36'	Stadium: Somerset Park; Attendance: 3,039; Referee: David Dickinson

21 December 2024 18	Falkirk	1–0	Hamilton Academical	Falkirk
15:00	Morrison 80'	Report		Stadium: Falkirk Stadium; Attendance: 5,532; Referee: Calum Scott

27 December 2024 19	Dunfermline Athletic	3–3	Falkirk	Dunfermline
19:45	Kane 25' (pen.); M.Todd 63' (pen.); Benedictus 90+2'	Report	Morrison 24'; Nesbitt 54'; Henderson 87'	Stadium: East End Park; Attendance: 8,558; Referee: Colin Steven

11 January 2025 20	Falkirk	0–0	Queen's Park	Falkirk
15:00		Report		Stadium: Falkirk Stadium; Attendance: 5,745; Referee: Chris Graham

25 January 2025 21	Raith Rovers	0–2	Falkirk	Kirkcaldy
15:00		Report	Henderson 6'; MacIver 60'	Stadium: Stark's Park; Attendance: 4,495; Referee: Calum Scott

31 January 2025 22	Falkirk	1–2	Livingston	Falkirk
19:45	Spencer 55' (pen.)	Report	Muirhead 13' (pen.); McAlear 45+4'	Stadium: Falkirk Stadium; Attendance: 6,381; Referee: Graham Grainger

8 February 2025 23	Falkirk	5–2	Partick Thistle	Falkirk
15:00	Arfield 1', 40' (pen.), 60' (pen.); Oliver 35'; McCann 76'	Report	Chalmers 10'; Graham 24' (red card)	Stadium: Falkirk Stadium; Attendance: 6,471; Referee: Ross Hardie

15 February 2025 24	Falkirk	2–2	Ayr United	Falkirk
15:00	Henderson 45'; Arfield 62'	Report	Henderson 14' (pen.); Oakley 38'	Stadium: Falkirk Stadium; Attendance: 7,419; Referee: Steven McLean

21 February 2025 25	Greenock Morton	0–2	Falkirk	Greenock
19:45		Report	Arfield 19'; Ross 27'	Stadium: Cappielow; Attendance: 2,194; Referee: Dan McFarlane

1 March 2025 26	Hamilton Academical	2–2	Falkirk	Hamilton
15:00	Tumilty 36'; McKinstry 44'	Report	Henderson 21'; Ageyman 90+1'	Stadium: New Douglas Park; Referee: Grant Irvine

4 March 2025 27	Airdrieonians	0–3	Falkirk	Airdrie
19:45		Report	Wilson 9' (o.g.); Spencer 39'; Stewart 77'	Stadium: Excelsior Stadium; Referee: Iain Snedden

8 March 2025 28	Falkirk	1–0	Dunfermline Athletic	Falkirk
15:00	Spencer 6'	Report		Stadium: Falkirk Stadium; Attendance: 7,106; Referee: Calum Scott

15 March 2025 29	Queen's Park	0–4	Falkirk	Glasgow
15:00		Report	Henderson 43'; Oliver 51'; Miller 59'; Lang 72'	Stadium: Hampden Park; Attendance: 2,685; Referee: Duncan Nicolson

22 March 2025 30	Falkirk	2–0	Airdrieonians	Falkirk
15:00	Miller 61'; Arfield 90+7' (pen.)	Report		Stadium: Falkirk Stadium; Attendance: 6,287; Referee: Euan Anderson

25 March 2025 31	Livingston	1–0	Falkirk	Livingston
19:45	Shinnie 88'	Report		Stadium: Almondvale Stadium; Attendance: 3,827; Referee: Nick Walsh

5 April 2025 32	Falkirk	5–0	Greenock Morton	Falkirk
15:00	Arfield 4', 44'; Miller 17'; Ross 54'; Stewart 79'	Report		Stadium: Falkirk Stadium; Attendance: 6,128; Referee: Grant Irvine

11 April 2025 33	Ayr United	1–1	Falkirk	Ayr
19:45	Walker 90' (red card) 90+3'	Report	Mackie 44'	Stadium: Somerset Park; Attendance: 4,471; Referee: Don Robertson

19 April 2025 34	Falkirk	1–3	Raith Rovers	Falkirk
15:00	Miller 17'; Mackie (yellow card) (yellow-red card) 61'	Report	Marsh 88'; Hanlon 90+2'; Easton 90+6' (pen.)	Stadium: Falkirk Stadium; Attendance: 7,539; Referee: Ross Hardie

25 April 2025 35	Partick Thistle	2–1	Falkirk	Glasgow
19:45	Graham 6'; Bannigan (yellow card) 35' (yellow-red card); Ablade 90+8'	Report	Arfield 39'; Agyeman (red card) 83'	Stadium: Firhill Stadium; Attendance: 4,997; Referee: Matthew MacDermid

2 May 2025 36	Falkirk	3–1	Hamilton Academical	Falkirk
19:45	Ross 33', 59'; Miller 71'	Report	Robinson 5'	Stadium: Falkirk Stadium; Attendance: 7,633; Referee: Steven McLean

=== Scottish League Cup ===
==== Group stage ====
13 July 2024 Group Stage	Falkirk	2–0	Dundee United	Falkirk
15:00	Tait 62'; MacIver 71'	Report		Stadium: Falkirk Stadium; Attendance: 3,305; Referee: Iain Sneddon

16 July 2024 Group Stage	Ayr United	1–0	Falkirk	Ayr
19:45	Dowds 5'	Report		Stadium: Somerset Park; Attendance: 1,900; Referee: Calum Scott

20 July 2024 Group Stage	Buckie Thistle	1–5	Falkirk	Buckie
15:00	MacAskill 28'	Report	Fyffe 21' (o.g.); Nesbitt 29', 84'; Mackie 31'; Shanley 90'	Stadium: Victoria Park; Attendance: 1,023; Referee: Greg Soutar

27 July 2024 Group Stage	Falkirk	4–0	Stenhousemuir	Falkirk
15:00	Morrison 25' (pen.); MacIver 31', 56'; Henderson 68'	Report		Stadium: Falkirk Stadium; Attendance: 2,964; Referee: Lloyd Wilson

==== Knockout phase ====
17 August 2024 Second round	Falkirk	2–0	Heart of Midlothian	Falkirk
15:00	Ross 53'; Tait 81'; Shanley (red card) 90+5'	Report		Stadium: Falkirk Stadium; Attendance: 6,653; Referee: David Dickinson

22 September 2024 Quarter-finals	Celtic	5–2	Falkirk	Glasgow
15:00	Bernardo 21'; Idah 70', 72'; Kühn 81', 84'	Report	MacIver 11'; Yeats 45+1'; McKenna (red card) 90'	Stadium: Celtic Park; Attendance: 42,960; Referee: Calum Scott

=== Scottish Challenge Cup ===
7 September 2024 Third round	Stenhousemuir	1–1 (5–4 p)	Falkirk	Stenhousemuir
15:00	Alston 84' (pen.)	Report	Henderson (red card) 67'; Miller 89'	Stadium: Ochilview Park; Attendance: 2,426; Referee: Gavin Duncan

=== Scottish Cup ===
2 December 2024 Third round	East Kilbride	1–3	Falkirk	East Kilbride
19:45	Ferguson 87'	Report	Agyeman 20'; Miller 37'; Morrison 88'	Stadium: K-Park Training Academy; Attendance: 692; Referee: Chris Graham

19 January 2025 Fourth round	Falkirk	1–2 (a.e.t.)	Raith Rovers	Falkirk
12:00	Morrison 79'	Report	Stanton 86'; Easton 109'	Stadium: Falkirk Stadium; Attendance: 4,557; Referee: Don Robertson

=== Stirlingshire Cup ===
19 November 2024 Group stage	Stenhousemuir	3–5	Falkirk	Stenhousemuir
19:45	Tomlinson 9'; Steele 68'; Aitken 69'		Agyeman 6', 29'; Honeyman 15' (pen.); Stewart 66'; Carmichael 76'	Stadium: Ochilview Park

7 January 2025 Group stage	Falkirk	8–0	Dumbarton	Falkirk
19:45	Stewart 9', 28'; McCafferty 22'; McCrone 53', 66', 82'; Honeyman 58'; Sinclair 88'			Stadium: Falkirk Stadium; Attendance: 552

11 March 2025 Final	Falkirk	5–1	Stirling Albion	Falkirk
19:45	Agyeman 1'; Thomson 4'; Honeyman 15', 31', 86'		Howe 65'	Stadium: Falkirk Stadium

== Squad statistics ==
As of 2 May 2025 (UTC)

No.	Pos	Nat	Player	Total		Championship		League Cup		Challenge Cup		Scottish Cup		Stirlingshire Cup	
No.	Pos	Nat	Player	Apps	Goals	Apps	Goals	Apps	Goals	Apps	Goals	Apps	Goals	Apps	Goals
1	GK	(Scotland) SCO	Nicky Hogarth	44	0	36+0	0	5+0	0	1+0	0	2+0	0	0+0	0
2	MF	(Scotland) SCO	Finn Yeats	37	1	1+25	0	4+2	1	1+0	0	0+1	0	3+0	0
3	DF	(Scotland) SCO	Leon McCann	18	1	12+3	1	0+0	0	1+0	0	1+0	0	1+0	0
4	DF	(Scotland) SCO	Tom Lang	11	1	8+3	1	0+0	0	0+0	0	0+0	0	0+0	0
5	DF	(Scotland) SCO	Liam Henderson	44	7	35+0	6	6+0	1	1+0	0	2+0	0	0+0	0
6	DF	(Scotland) SCO	Coll Donaldson	26	0	19+1	0	3+0	0	1+0	0	1+0	0	1+0	0
7	MF	(Scotland) SCO	Miller Thomson	10	1	1+8	0	0+0	0	0+0	0	0+0	0	1+0	1
8	MF	(Scotland) SCO	Brad Spencer	44	8	36+0	8	6+0	0	0+0	0	2+0	0	0+0	0
9	FW	(Scotland) SCO	Ross MacIver	30	7	13+7	3	6+0	4	0+1	0	1+1	0	1+0	0
10	MF	(Scotland) SCO	Aidan Nesbitt	36	4	15+16	2	3+0	2	0+0	0	2+0	0	0+0	0
11	FW	(Ghana) GHA	Alfredo Agyeman	42	9	8+23	5	2+4	0	1+0	0	2+0	1	2+0	3
12	GK	(Scotland) SCO	Jamie Sneddon	1	0	0+0	0	1+0	0	0+0	0	0+0	0	0+0	0
16	FW	(England) ENG	Barney Stewart	18	4	5+11	2	0+0	0	0+0	0	0+1	0	1+0	2
18	FW	(Scotland) SCO	Gary Oliver	42	3	22+11	3	2+4	0	0+1	0	1+1	0	0+0	0
20	DF	(Scotland) SCO	Keelan Adams	43	3	35+0	3	5+0	0	1+0	0	2+0	0	0+0	0
21	MF	(Scotland) SCO	Dylan Tait	40	4	26+5	2	6+0	2	1+0	0	2+0	0	0+0	0
22	DF	(Scotland) SCO	Luke Graham	23	0	20+3	0	0+0	0	0+0	0	0+0	0	0+0	0
23	MF	(Scotland) SCO	Ethan Ross	44	9	29+6	8	2+4	1	1+0	0	1+0	0	1+0	0
24	DF	(Republic of Ireland) IRL	Darragh O'Connor	1	0	0+1	0	0+0	0	0+0	0	0+0	0	0+0	0
25	FW	(Scotland) SCO	Eamonn Brophy	4	0	1+3	0	0+0	0	0+0	0	0+0	0	0+0	0
26	DF	(Scotland) SCO	Sean Mackie	30	4	19+1	3	6+0	1	0+1	0	2+0	0	1+0	0
29	MF	(Scotland) SCO	Calvin Miller	45	12	34+2	10	6+0	0	0+1	1	1+1	1	0+0	0
31	GK	(Scotland) SCO	Ross Munro	2	0	0+0	0	0+0	0	0+0	0	0+0	0	2+0	0
34	FW	(Scotland) SCO	Flynn McCafferty	2	1	0+0	0	0+0	0	0+0	0	0+0	0	1+1	1
37	MF	(Canada) CAN	Scott Arfield	13	9	12+1	9	0+0	0	0+0	0	0+0	0	0+0	0
Players who left the club during the 2024–25 season
7	MF	(Scotland) SCO	Callumn Morrison	18	6	4+8	3	3+0	1	0+0	0	0+2	2	1+0	0
14	MF	(Scotland) SCO	Michael McKenna	26	0	1+16	0	0+5	0	1+0	0	0+2	0	1+0	0
19	FW	(Scotland) SCO	Ryan Shanley	14	1	0+8	0	0+5	1	1+0	0	0+0	0	0+0	0
27	GK	(Scotland) SCO	Owen Hayward	1	0	0+0	0	0+0	0	0+0	0	0+0	0	1+0	0
30	MF	(Scotland) SCO	Scott Honeyman	3	5	0+0	0	0+0	0	0+0	0	0+0	0	3+0	5
32	MF	(Scotland) SCO	Rhys Walker	2	0	0+0	0	0+0	0	0+0	0	0+0	0	2+0	0
33	DF	(Scotland) SCO	Logan Sinclair	3	1	0+0	0	0+0	0	0+0	0	0+0	0	3+0	1
35	FW	(Scotland) SCO	Caelan McCrone	3	3	0+0	0	0+1	0	0+0	0	0+0	0	2+0	3
72	FW	(Scotland) SCO	Jordan Allan	0	0	0+0	0	0+0	0	0+0	0	0+0	0	0+0	0

== Team statistics ==
=== League table ===
Pos	Team	Pld	W	D	L	GF	GA	GD	Pts	Promotion, qualification or relegation
1	Falkirk (C, P)	36	22	7	7	72	33	+39	73	Promotion to the Premiership
2	Livingston (O, P)	36	20	10	6	55	27	+28	70	Qualification for the Premiership play-off semi-final
3	Ayr United	36	18	9	9	57	39	+18	63	Qualification for the Premiership play-off quarter-final
4	Partick Thistle	36	15	10	11	43	38	+5	55	Qualification for the Premiership play-off quarter-final
5	Raith Rovers	36	15	8	13	47	43	+4	53	

Rules for classification: 1) Points; 2) Goal difference; 3) Goals scored; 4) Head-to-to head points; 5) Head-to-head goal difference; 6) Play-off (only for deciding promotion, play-off participation and relegation).
(C) Champions; (O) Play-off winners; (P) Promoted

=== League cup table ===
Pos	Team	Pld	W	PW	PL	L	GF	GA	GD	Pts	Qualification	FAL	DUN	AYR	STE	BUC
1	Falkirk	4	3	0	0	1	11	2	+9	9	Qualification for the second round	—	2–0	—	4–0	—
2	Dundee United	4	3	0	0	1	10	5	+5	9	Qualification for the second round	—	—	2–1	3–0	—
3	Ayr United	4	3	0	0	1	9	5	+4	9		1–0	—	—	—	3–2
4	Stenhousemuir	4	1	0	0	3	5	11	−6	3		—	—	1–4	—	4–0
5	Buckie Thistle	4	0	0	0	4	5	17	−12	0		1–5	2–5	—	—	—

Rules for classification: 1) goal difference, 2) goals scored, 3) away goals scored, 4) matches won, 5) away matches won, 6) drawing of lots.

== Transfers ==
=== Players in ===
Player	From	Fee
(Scotland) Michael McKenna	(Scotland) Arbroath	Free
(Scotland) Ethan Ross	(Scotland) Raith Rovers	Free
(Scotland) Jamie Sneddon	(Scotland) Partick Thistle	Free
(Scotland) Dylan Tait	(Scotland) Hibernian	Undisclosed
(England) Barney Stewart	(Scotland) Heriot-Watt University	Free
(Scotland) Ross Munro	(Republic of Ireland) Dundalk	Free
(Canada) Scott Arfield	(England) Bolton Wanderers	Free
(Scotland) Connor Allan	(Scotland) Rangers	Undisclosed

=== Players out ===
Player	To	Fee
(Scotland) Stephen McGinn	Retired	
(Scotland) Brad McKay	(Scotland) Brechin City	Free
(Republic of Ireland) Ola Lawal	(England) Marine	Free
(Scotland) Ryan Shanley	(Scotland) Stirling Albion	Free
(Scotland) Michael McKenna	(Scotland) East Fife	Free
(Scotland) Callumn Morrison	(Northern Ireland) Linfield	Undisclosed

=== Loans in ===
Player	To	Fee
(Scotland) Luke Graham	(Scotland) Dundee	Loan
(Republic of Ireland) Darragh O'Connor	(England) York City	Loan
(Scotland) Eamonn Brophy	(Scotland) Ross County	Loan
(Scotland) Miller Thomson	(Scotland) Dundee United	Loan

=== Loans out ===
Player	To	Fee
(Scotland) Jordan Allan	(Scotland) Clyde	Loan
(Scotland) Rhys Walker	(Scotland) Cowdenbeath	Loan
(Scotland) Logan Sinclair	(Scotland) Gala Fairydean Rovers	Loan
(Scotland) Scott Honeyman	(Scotland) Alloa Athletic	Loan
(England) Barney Stewart	(Scotland) Heriot-Watt University	Loan
(Scotland) Jordan Allan	(Scotland) Queen of the South	Loan
(Scotland) Owen Hayward	(Scotland) Dumbarton	Loan
(Scotland) Connor Allan	(Scotland) Kelty Hearts	Loan
(Scotland) Caelan McCrone	(Scotland) Civil Service Strollers	Loan

== See also ==
- List of Falkirk F.C. seasons
