= 2023–24 Falkirk F.C. season =

Falkirk
2023–24 season
- Manager: John McGlynn
- Stadium: Falkirk Stadium
- League One: Winners
- Scottish Cup: Fourth round
- League Cup: Group stage
- Challenge Cup: Semi-final
- Top goalscorer: League: Callumn Morrison (22); All: Callumn Morrison (24)
- Highest home attendance: 7,272, vs. Alloa Athletic, League One, 4 May 2024
- Lowest home attendance: 1,779, vs. Peterhead, League Cup, 29 July 2023
Home colours	Away colours	Third colours

The 2023–24 season was Falkirk's fifth season in League One following their relegation from the Championship at the end of the 2018–19 season. Falkirk also competed in the League Cup, Challenge Cup and the Scottish Cup.

== Summary ==
Falkirk would exit the League Cup in the group stages, but would progress to the semi-final of the Challenge Cup, losing out on the final to Welsh champions The New Saints. They would also exit the Scottish Cup at the fourth round, losing to Bonnyrigg Rose.

John McGlynn would take charge of Falkirk for his second full season in charge, leading the club back to the Championship for the first time since 2019 as invincible title winners.

McGlynn would be voted Manager of the Year at the PFA Scotland awards in May 2024.

== Results and fixtures ==
Win Draw Loss Postponed

=== Pre-season ===
27 June 2023	Civil Service Strollers	1–2	Falkirk	Edinburgh
19:45	Lawson 16'	Report	Allan 70', 90'	Stadium: Christie Gillies Park

4 July 2023	Bonnyrigg Rose	0–3	Falkirk	Bonnyrigg
19:30		Report	Oliver 24'; Morrison 37'; Honeyman 90'	Stadium: New Dundas Park

8 July 2023	Motherwell	2–2	Falkirk	Dalziel Park
14:00	Spittal 20'; Slattery 63'	Report	Oliver 2'; MacIver 77'

15 July 2023	Falkirk	1–2	Arbroath	Falkirk
14:00	MacIver 6'	Report	Bird 20'; Baldé 60'	Stadium: Falkirk Stadium

=== Scottish League One ===
5 August 2023 1	Falkirk	3–0	Annan Athletic	Falkirk
15:00	MacIver 58'; Morrison 63'; Nesbitt 79'	Report		Stadium: Falkirk Stadium; Attendance: 4,056; Referee: Stewart Luke

12 August 2023 2	Cove Rangers	2–2	Falkirk	Cove Bay
15:00	Kerr 51' (pen.); Burrell 72'	Report	Gillingham 51' (o.g.); Allan 90+6'	Stadium: Balmoral Stadium; Attendance: 1,007; Referee: Steven Kirkland

22 August 2023 3	Falkirk	3–0	Stirling Albion	Falkirk
19:45	Spencer 11'; Morrison 27' (pen.); MacIver 36'	Report		Stadium: Falkirk Stadium; Attendance: 4,301; Referee: Chris Graham

26 August 2023 4	Alloa Athletic	1–4	Falkirk	Alloa
17:30	Rodden 85'	Report	Miller 32'; Agyeman 45+1'; MacIver 64'; Lawal 90+1'	Stadium: Recreation Park; Attendance: 1,334; Referee: Calum Scott

2 September 2023 5	Edinburgh City	0–2	Falkirk	Edinburgh
15:00		Report	Agyeman 29'; Morrison 46'	Stadium: Meadowbank Stadium; Attendance: 996; Referee: Stewart Luke

16 September 2023 6	Falkirk	1–0	Queen of the South	Falkirk
15:00	Spencer 88'	Report		Stadium: Falkirk Stadium; Attendance: 4,502; Referee: Colin Steven

23 September 2023 7	Kelty Hearts	1–5	Falkirk	Kelty
17:30		Report	Henderson 2'; Morrison 19' (pen.), 33'; MacIver 73'; Nesbitt 80'	Stadium: New Central Park; Attendance: 1,128; Referee: Iain Snedden

30 September 2023 8	Falkirk	3–2	Montrose	Falkirk
15:00	Oliver 62'; Morrison 71' (pen.), 90+3'	Report	Lyons 47'; Webster 85' (pen.)	Stadium: Falkirk Stadium; Attendance: 4,093; Referee: George Calder

7 October 2023 9	Falkirk	0–0	Hamilton Academical	Falkirk
17:30		Report		Stadium: Falkirk Stadium; Attendance: 4,837; Referee: Euan Anderson

21 October 2023 10	Stirling Albion	1–2	Falkirk	Stirling
15:00	Dunsmore 44'	Report	MacIver 5'; Spencer 83'	Stadium: Forthbank Stadium; Attendance: 2,390; Referee: Colin Whyte

28 October 2023 11	Falkirk	3–0	Alloa Athletic	Falkirk
15:00	Agyeman 3', 23'; Donaldson 39'	Report		Stadium: Falkirk Stadium; Attendance: 4,449; Referee: Duncan Williams

4 November 2023 12	Queen of the South	1–1	Falkirk	Dumfries
15:00	Reilly 24'	Report	Lang 11'	Stadium: Palmerston Park; Attendance: 1,498; Referee: Craig Napier

11 November 2023 13	Falkirk	2–1	Edinburgh City	Falkirk
15:00	Nesbitt 40'; MacIver 66'	Report	Murray 9'	Stadium: Falkirk Stadium; Attendance: 4,282; Referee: Alastair Grieve

28 November 2023 14	Montrose	0–0	Falkirk	Montrose
19:45		Report		Stadium: Links Park; Attendance: 775; Referee: Gavin Duncan

9 December 2023 16	Falkirk	2–1	Kelty Hearts	Falkirk
15:00	Nesbitt 41'; MacIver 76'	Report	Bavidge 66'	Stadium: Falkirk Stadium; Attendance: 3,921; Referee: Iain Snedden

16 December 2023 17	Hamilton Academical	1–3	Falkirk	Hamilton
15:00	Smith 28'	Report	Morrison 23' (pen.), 79'; Miller 32'	Stadium: New Douglas Park; Attendance: 3,821; Referee: Calum Scott

23 December 2023 18	Annan Athletic	0–3	Falkirk	Annan
15:00		Report	Donaldson 40'; Lang 56'; MacIver 67'	Stadium: Galabank; Attendance: 995; Referee: Steven Kirkland

30 December 2023 19	Falkirk	5–0	Stirling Albion	Falkirk
15:00	Henderson 3'; Miller 13'; MacIver 16'; Brad Spencer 35'; Oliver 55'	Report		Stadium: Falkirk Stadium; Attendance: 4,683; Referee: Craig Napier

6 January 2024 20	Falkirk	1–0	Queen of the South	Falkirk
15:00	Nesbitt 46'	Report		Stadium: Falkirk Stadium; Attendance: 4,769; Referee: Chris Fordyce

9 January 2024 15	Falkirk	4–0	Cove Rangers	Falkirk
19:45	Morrison 42', 65'; Henderson 47'; Oliver 86'	Report		Stadium: Falkirk Stadium; Attendance: 4,411; Referee: George Calder
Note: Match postponed due to a frozen pitch.

13 January 2024 21	Edinburgh City	2–2	Falkirk	Edinburgh
15:00	Flatman 28'; Faye 34'	Report	Miller 53', 90+6' (pen.)	Stadium: Meadowbank Stadium; Attendance: 1,238; Referee: Iain Snedden

27 January 2024 22	Alloa Athletic	0–5	Falkirk	Alloa
15:00		Report	Morrison 25'; Miller 50'; Henderson 63'; Tait 80'; Shanley 89'	Stadium: Recreation Park; Attendance: 1,852; Referee: Peter Stuart

17 February 2024 24	Falkirk	3–2	Hamilton Academical	Falkirk
15:00	Morrison 15'; MacIver 23'; Miller 27'	Report	Rose 32', 57'	Stadium: Falkirk Stadium; Attendance: 5,756; Referee: Colin Steven

20 February 2024 25	Falkirk	3–0	Montrose	Falkirk
19:45	Machado 5' (o.g.); Nesbitt 20'; Oliver 90+3'	Report		Stadium: Falkirk Stadium; Attendance: 4,197; Referee: Iain Snedden

24 February 2024 26	Kelty Hearts	0–1	Falkirk	Kelty
15:00	Johnston (red card) 45'	Report	Lang 23'	Stadium: New Central Park; Attendance: 1,437; Referee: Peter Stuart

2 March 2024 27	Falkirk	1–1	Annan Athletic	Falkirk
15:00	Morrison 61'	Report	Muir 90+4'	Stadium: Falkirk Stadium; Attendance: 4,693; Referee: Steven Kirkland

5 March 2024 23	Cove Rangers	0–1	Falkirk	Cove Bay
19:45		Report	Miller 83'	Stadium: Balmoral Stadium; Attendance: 745; Referee: Chris Fordyce

9 March 2024 28	Stirling Albion	1–2	Falkirk	Stirling
15:00	McLean 8'	Report	Morrison 17'; Oliver 88'	Stadium: Forthbank Stadium; Attendance: 2,800; Referee: Euan Anderson

16 March 2024 29	Queen of the South	1–4	Falkirk	Dumfries
17:30		Report	Morrison 59', 78' (pen.); Henderson 66'; Nesbitt 90'	Stadium: Palmerston Park; Attendance: 998; Referee: Gavin Duncan

23 March 2024 30	Falkirk	4–1	Edinburgh City	Falkirk
15:00	Morrison 31' (pen.), 45+2', 61', 81' (pen.)	Report	Sambou 90'	Stadium: Falkirk Stadium; Attendance: 5,864; Referee: Colin Whyte

30 March 2024 31	Montrose	1–7	Falkirk	Montrose
17:30	Hester 31'	Report	MacIver 4', 49'; Nesbitt 21', 47'; Ross 33'; Agyeman 66'; Shanley 76'	Stadium: Links Park; Attendance: 3,042; Referee: Graham Grainger

6 April 2024 32	Falkirk	5–1	Cove Rangers	Falkirk
17:30	Donaldson 13'; Morrison 25'; MacIver 50'; Tait 62'; Agyeman 90+2'	Report	Kerr 34'	Stadium: Falkirk Stadium; Attendance: 4,810; Referee: Peter Stuart

13 April 2024 33	Hamilton Academical	0–2	Falkirk	Hamilton
17:30		Report	MacIver 50'; Nesbitt 86'	Stadium: New Douglas Park; Attendance: 2,211; Referee: Craig Napier

20 April 2024 34	Falkirk	2–2	Kelty Hearts	Falkirk
15:00	Miller 8'; Donaldson (red card) 17'; Morrison 32'	Report	McCann 25' (o.g.); Lyon 33'	Stadium: Falkirk Stadium; Attendance: 4,607; Referee: Grant Irvine

27 April 2024 35	Annan Athletic	3–3	Falkirk	Annan
15:00	Gibson 45+2' (pen.), 76' (pen.); Smith 90'	Report	Henderson 11', 48'; Nesbitt 61'	Stadium: Galabank; Attendance: 1,273; Referee: Duncan Williams

4 May 2024 36	Falkirk	2–2	Alloa Athletic	Falkirk
15:00	Nesbitt 45+1'; Spencer 85' (pen.)	Report	Sammon 29', 45'	Stadium: Falkirk Stadium; Attendance: 7,272; Referee: Calum Scott

=== Scottish League Cup ===
==== Group stage ====
18 July 2023 Group Stage	The Spartans	1–2	Falkirk	Edinburgh
19:45	Henderson 60'	Report	Lang 6'; MacIver 88'	Stadium: Ainslie Park; Attendance: 874; Referee: Duncan Williams

22 July 2023 Group Stage	Partick Thistle	2–2 (6–7 p)	Falkirk	Glasgow
15:00	Graham 68'; Lyon 90+3'	Report	MacIver 14'; Spencer (red card) 67'; Agyeman 71'	Stadium: Firhill Stadium; Attendance: 2,607; Referee: Steven Kirkland

25 July 2023 Group Stage	Falkirk	0–1	Dundee United	Falkirk
19:45		Report	Fotheringham 28'	Stadium: Falkirk Stadium; Attendance: 3,186; Referee: David Munro

29 July 2023 Group Stage	Falkirk	4–1	Peterhead	Falkirk
15:00	Lang 29'; MacIver 45+2'; Agyeman 47'; Miller 56'	Report	O'Keefe 6'	Stadium: Falkirk Stadium; Attendance: 1,779; Referee: Alastair Grieve

=== Scottish Challenge Cup ===
5 September 2023 Third round	Ayr United	0–1	Falkirk	Ayr
19:45	Syla (red card) 70'	Report	Henderson 30'	Stadium: Somerset Park; Attendance: 1,423; Referee: Steve Kirkland

14 October 2023 Fourth round	Falkirk	1–0	Queen's Park	Falkirk
15:00	Allan 6' (pen.)	Report		Stadium: Falkirk Stadium; Attendance: 2,427; Referee: Scott Lambie

17 November 2023 Quarter-final	Falkirk	4–2	Dundee United	Falkirk
19:40	Morrison 4', 71'; Lang 65'; Yeats 69'	Report	Cudjoe 23'; Watt 33'	Stadium: Falkirk Stadium; Attendance: 2,891; Referee: Grant Irvine

3 February 2024 Semi-final	Falkirk	0–1	(Wales) The New Saints	Falkirk
19:40		Report	Young 26'	Stadium: Falkirk Stadium; Attendance: 3,582; Referee: Chris Graham

=== Scottish Cup ===
25 November 2023 Third round	Falkirk	3–0	Formartine United	Falkirk
15:00	Ross 34'; Miller 37'; MacIver 39'	Report		Stadium: Falkirk Stadium; Attendance: 2,273; Referee: Jordan Curran

20 January 2024 Fourth round	Bonnyrigg Rose	2–1	Falkirk	Bonnyrigg
15:00	Doan 4'; Barrett 90'	Report	Henderson 30'	Stadium: New Dundas Park; Attendance: 1,801; Referee: Graham Grainger

== Squad statistics ==
As of (UTC) 4 May 2024

No.	Pos	Nat	Player	Total		League One		League Cup		Challenge Cup		Scottish Cup	
No.	Pos	Nat	Player	Apps	Goals	Apps	Goals	Apps	Goals	Apps	Goals	Apps	Goals
1	GK	(Scotland) SCO	Sam Long	25	0	19+0	0	4+0	0	1+0	0	1+0	0
2	DF	(Scotland) SCO	Tom Lang	36	6	26+0	3	4+0	2	4+0	1	2+0	0
3	DF	(Scotland) SCO	Leon McCann	42	0	31+2	0	2+1	0	4+0	0	2+0	0
4	MF	(Scotland) SCO	Stephen McGinn	17	0	4+9	0	4+0	0	0+0	0	0+0	0
5	DF	(Scotland) SCO	Liam Henderson	38	9	28+2	7	0+2	0	4+0	1	2+0	1
6	DF	(Scotland) SCO	Coll Donaldson	42	2	31+1	2	4+0	0	4+0	0	2+0	0
7	MF	(Scotland) SCO	Callumn Morrison	40	25	32+0	23	4+0	0	2+0	2	2+0	0
8	MF	(Scotland) SCO	Brad Spencer	41	5	32+2	5	3+0	0	2+1	0	1+0	0
10	MF	(Scotland) SCO	Aidan Nesbitt	39	12	25+9	12	0+0	0	3+0	0	2+0	0
11	FW	(Ghana) GHA	Alfredo Agyeman	42	8	12+21	6	4+0	2	1+2	0	0+2	0
14	MF	(Scotland) SCO	Finn Yeats	44	1	31+3	0	4+0	0	4+0	1	2+0	0
15	MF	(Scotland) SCO	Dylan Tait	15	2	10+5	2	0+0	0	0+0	0	0+0	0
17	FW	(Scotland) SCO	Ross MacIver	45	18	33+2	14	4+0	3	2+2	0	2+0	1
18	FW	(Scotland) SCO	Gary Oliver	36	5	6+23	5	3+0	0	2+1	0	0+1	0
19	FW	(Scotland) SCO	Ryan Shanley	17	2	2+14	2	0+0	0	0+1	0	0+0	0
20	DF	(Scotland) SCO	Layton Bisland	15	0	6+5	0	0+0	0	1+2	0	0+1	0
21	FW	(Republic of Ireland) IRL	Ola Lawal	18	1	0+10	1	2+2	0	2+1	0	0+1	0
23	MF	(Scotland) SCO	Ethan Ross	33	2	9+22	1	0	0	0	0	1+1	1
26	DF	(Scotland) SCO	Sean Mackie	19	0	11+3	0	2+0	0	0+2	0	0+1	0
29	MF	(Scotland) SCO	Calvin Miller	40	11	26+5	9	0+4	1	2+1	0	2+0	1
31	GK	(Scotland) SCO	Nicky Hogarth	21	0	17+0	0	0+0	0	3+0	0	1+0	0
34	FW	(Scotland) SCO	Harrison Howe	1	0	0+0	0	0+0	0	0+1	0	0+0	0
Players who left the club during the 2023–24 season
9	FW	(Scotland) SCO	Jordan Allan	22	2	1+14	1	0+2	0	2+1	1	0+2	0
22	DF	(Scotland) SCO	Brad McKay	5	0	0+2	0	0+3	0	0+0	0	0+0	0
27	GK	(Scotland) SCO	Owen Hayward	0	0	0+0	0	0+0	0	0+0	0	0+0	0
30	MF	(Scotland) SCO	Scott Honeyman	3	0	0+2	0	0+0	0	0+1	0	0+0	0
32	MF	(Scotland) SCO	Rhys Walker	2	0	0+1	0	0+0	0	0+1	0	0+0	0
33	DF	(Scotland) SCO	Logan Sinclair	0	0	0+0	0	0+0	0	0+0	0	0+0	0

== Team statistics ==
=== League table ===
Pos	Team	Pld	W	D	L	GF	GA	GD	Pts	Promotion, qualification or relegation
1	Falkirk (C, P)	36	27	9	0	96	28	+68	90	Promotion to the Championship
2	Hamilton Academical (O, P)	36	22	8	6	73	28	+45	74	Qualification for the Championship play-offs
3	Alloa Athletic	36	16	8	12	60	55	+5	56	Qualification for the Championship play-offs
4	Montrose	36	15	8	13	58	57	+1	53	Qualification for the Championship play-offs
5	Cove Rangers	36	14	7	15	58	63	−5	49	

Rules for classification: 1) Points; 2) Goal difference; 3) Goals scored; 4) Head-to-to head points; 5) Head-to-head goal difference; 6) Play-off (only for deciding promotion, play-off participation and relegation).
(C) Champions; (O) Play-off winners; (P) Promoted

=== League cup table ===
Pos	Team	Pld	W	PW	PL	L	GF	GA	GD	Pts	Qualification	PAR	FAL	DUN	SPA	PET
1	Partick Thistle	4	2	1	1	0	7	5	+2	9	Qualification for the second round	—	2–2p	—	2–1	—
2	Falkirk	4	2	1	0	1	8	5	+3	8		—	—	0–1	—	4–1
3	Dundee United	4	2	0	0	2	5	3	+2	6		1–2	—	—	—	3–0
4	The Spartans	4	2	0	0	2	5	5	0	6		—	1–2	1–0	—	—
5	Peterhead	4	0	0	1	3	3	10	−7	1		1–1p	—	—	1–2	—

Rules for classification: 1) goal difference, 2) goals scored, 3) away goals scored, 4) matches won, 5) away matches won, 6) drawing of lots.

== Transfers ==
=== Players in ===
Player	From	Fee
(Ghana) Alfredo Agyeman	(Scotland) Kelty Hearts	Free
(Scotland) Ross MacIver	(Scotland) Alloa Athletic	Free
(Scotland) Nicky Hogarth	(England) Nottingham Forest	Free
(Scotland) Tom Lang	(Scotland) Raith Rovers	Free
(Scotland) Calvin Miller	(Scotland) Greenock Morton	Free
(Scotland) Brad Spencer	(Scotland) Raith Rovers	Free
(Scotland) Ryan Shanley	(Scotland) Edinburgh City	Free
(Scotland) Keelan Adams	(Scotland) Cumbernauld Colts	Free

=== Players out ===
Player	To	Fee
(England) Rumarn Burrell	(Scotland) Cove Rangers	Free
(Scotland) Kyle Connolly	(Scotland) East Stirlingshire	Free
(England) Steven Hetherington	(Scotland) Alloa Athletic	Free
(Scotland) Finlay Malcolm	(Scotland) Bo'ness United	Free
(Scotland) Paddy Martin	(Scotland) Bonnyrigg Rose	Free
(Scotland) Craig McGuffie	(Scotland) Queen of the South	Free
(Scotland) P. J. Morrison	(Scotland) Alloa Athletic	Free
(Scotland) Blair Sneddon	(Scotland) Berwick Rangers	Free
(Scotland) Lennon Walker	(Scotland) Tranent	Free
(Scotland) Ryan Williamson	(Scotland) Montrose	Free
(Scotland) Pearse Carroll	(Scotland) Whitburn	Free

=== Loans in ===
Player	To	Fee
(Scotland) Sam Long	(England) Lincoln City	Free
(Scotland) Layton Bisland	(Scotland) Dundee Utd	Loan
(Scotland) Ethan Ross	(Scotland) Raith Rovers	Loan
(Scotland) Dylan Tait	(Scotland) Hibernian	Loan

=== Loans out ===
Player	To	Fee
(Scotland) Owen Hayward	(Scotland) Penicuik Athletic	Loan
(Scotland) Scott Honeyman	(Scotland) East Stirlingshire	Loan
(Scotland) Rhys Walker	(Scotland) Camelon Juniors	Loan
(Scotland) Logan Sinclair	(Scotland) Tynecastle	Loan
(Scotland) Brad McKay	(Scotland) Kelty Hearts	Loan
(Scotland) Jordan Allan	(Scotland) Clyde	Loan
(Republic of Ireland) Ola Lawal	(Scotland) Cove Rangers	Loan

== See also ==
- List of Falkirk F.C. seasons
