= Brad Spencer (footballer) =

English-born Scottish footballer

Personal information
- Date of birth: 16 May 1996 (age 30)
- Place of birth: London, England
- Height: 5 ft 8 in (1.73 m)
- Position: Midfielder

Team information
- Current team: Falkirk
- Number: 8

Youth career
- Portland Timbers
- 2012–2016: Houston Dynamo

Senior career*
Years	Team	Apps	(Gls)
2017–2018	Kilmarnock	0	(0)
2018–2019	Dumbarton	16	(3)
2019	Forfar Athletic	12	(2)
2019–2023	Raith Rovers	93	(5)
2023–	Falkirk	109	(13)
- * Club domestic league appearances and goals as of 20 May 2026

Brad Spencer (born 16 May 1996) is a Scottish professional footballer who plays as a midfielder for Scottish Premiership club Falkirk. He is vice-captain of the club.

== Background ==
Brad Spencer is the son of former Scotland striker John Spencer. As a result of his father's career path, Brad was born in London and spent some of his childhood living in southern England and the United States.

== Career ==
After spending his youth career with Houston Dynamo, Spencer signed for Scottish top division side Kilmarnock in the summer of 2017 but was released a year later without making a first team appearance. He moved down to Scottish League One club Dumbarton where he made no great impact, but after switching to fellow third tier part-timers Forfar Athletic in January 2019 he became an important member of the team which finished second and took part in the Championship play-offs, although they were eliminated by Raith Rovers (who also failed in their efforts to move up a level).

Spencer then returned to full-time football when he signed for Raith a short time later, and having quickly agreed an extension to his initial one-year contract he went on to play a role in their 2019–20 Scottish League One title win and promotion. After missing most of the pre-season with a knee injury, his debut in the Scottish Championship (which was delayed and shortened by the COVID-19 pandemic in Scotland, in addition to the previous campaign being ended early) came in October 2020 when he came off the bench in the first half and provided an assist in a 5–2 win over Queen of the South.

He joined Falkirk in the summer of 2023, where he scored a penalty on the final day to complete an undefeated league winning campaign.

== Career statistics ==
As of match played 25 October 2025

Appearances and goals by club, season and competition
Club	Season	League			Scottish Cup		League Cup		Other		Total	
Club	Season	Division	Apps	Goals	Apps	Goals	Apps	Goals	Apps	Goals	Apps	Goals
Kilmarnock	2017–18	Scottish Premiership	0	0	0	0	0	0	—		0	0
Dumbarton	2018–19	Scottish League One	17	3	1	0	0	0	1 (Note: Appearance(s) in Scottish Challenge Cup)	0	19	3
Forfar Athletic	2018–19	Scottish League One	12	2	—		—		2 (Note: Appearance(s) in Scottish Championship play-offs)	0	14	2
Raith Rovers	2019–20	Scottish League One	27	3	1	0	3	0	5	0	36	3
Raith Rovers	2020–21	Scottish Championship	22	1	2	0	3	0	4 (Note: Appearance(s) in Scottish Premiership play-offs)	0	31	1
Raith Rovers	2021–22	Scottish Championship	19	1	1	0	5	2	1	0	26	3
Raith Rovers	2022–23	Scottish Championship	25	0	4	0	0	0	4	0	33	0
Raith Rovers	Total		93	5	8	0	11	2	14	0	126	7
Falkirk	2023–24	Scottish League One	35	5	1	0	3	0	3	0	42	5
Falkirk	2024–25	Scottish Championship	36	8	2	0	6	0	0	0	44	8
Falkirk	2025–26	Scottish Premiership	38	0	4	1	5	0	—		47	1
Falkirk	2026–27	Scottish Premiership	11	0	0	0	4	0	0	0	15	0
Falkirk	Total		120	13	7	1	18	0	3	0	148	14
Career total			202	23	12	0	25	2	20	0	274	25

== Honours ==
Raith Rovers

- Scottish League One: 2019–20
- Scottish Challenge Cup: 2021–22

Falkirk

- Scottish League One: 2023–24
- Scottish Championship: 2024–25

Individual

- PFA Scotland Team of the Year: 2023–24 Scottish League One
