= Sean Mackie =

Scottish footballer (born 1998)

Personal information
- Date of birth: 4 November 1998 (age 27)
- Positions: Left-back; winger

Team information
- Current team: Arbroath
- Number: 26

Youth career
- Fife Elite Academy

Senior career*
Years	Team	Apps	(Gls)
2015–2016	Raith Rovers	1	(0)
2016–2022	Hibernian	15	(0)
2016–2017	→ Berwick Rangers (loan)	3	(0)
2017	→ Edinburgh City (loan)	6	(0)
2019–2020	→ Dundee (loan)	12	(1)
2022	→ Raith Rovers (loan)	7	(0)
2022–2026	Falkirk	56	(3)
2025–2026	→ Ross County (loan)	10	(0)
2026–	Arbroath	3	(0)

International career^{‡}
2019	Scotland U21	1	(0)
- * Club domestic league appearances and goals as of 24 August 2026 ‡ National team caps and goals as of 12:33, 4 August 2019 (UTC)

Sean Mackie (born 4 November 1998) is a Scottish footballer who plays as a left-back for Scottish Championship club Arbroath. Mackie has previously played for Raith Rovers, Hibernian, Berwick Rangers, Edinburgh City, Dundee, Falkirk and Ross County.

== Career ==
=== Club ===
Mackie joined Raith Rovers in 2015 from the Fife Elite Academy, signing a two-year contract. He made one first team appearance for Raith before moving to Hibernian in February 2016. Hibs paid a fee of £25,000 for the player.

Mackie was loaned to Berwick Rangers for the first part of the 2016–17 season. He made his first team debut for Hibs in April 2017, in a 3–2 win against Raith Rovers. On 6 July 2017, Mackie joined Scottish League Two club Edinburgh City on a six-month development loan deal.

In July 2019, Mackie signed an extended contract with Hibs. In September 2019, Mackie joined Dundee on loan. This arrangement was curtailed in January 2020 due to Mackie suffering an injury.

Mackie continued to suffer from injury problems over the next two seasons, limiting his appearances for Hibs. With his contract due to expire at the end of the 2021–22 season, he was loaned to former club Raith Rovers in February 2022. While with Raith, Mackie would win the Scottish Challenge Cup. He was released by Hibs in June 2022, at the end of his contract.

On 9 June 2022, Mackie was signed by Scottish League One side Falkirk on a two-year deal. In March 2024, Mackie won the League One title with the Bairns on the same night they destroyed Montrose at Links Park. After completing an unbeaten league season with Falkirk, Mackie signed an extension with the Bairns to keep him there for the following season.

On 20 July 2024, Mackie scored his first goal for Falkirk in a Scottish League Cup group stage win over Buckie Thistle. Two weeks later, he netted his first league goal in Falkirk's first game back in the Scottish Championship, scoring the winning goal against Queen's Park. On 2 May 2025, Mackie started in a 3–1 home win over Hamilton Academical which confirmed him and Falkirk as back-to-back league title winners, as well as their promotion to the Scottish Premiership.

Mackie joined Ross County on 30 September 2025 on loan. After County's relegation to League One, Mackie's loan ended and Falkirk announced he was leaving them as his contract had expired.

On 18 July 2026, Mackie joined Scottish Championship club Arbroath on a one-year deal.

=== International ===
Mackie made one appearance for the Scotland under-21 team, in March 2019.

== Career statistics ==
As of 22 August 2026

Appearances and goals by club, season and competition
Club	Season	League			Cup		League Cup		Other		Total	
Club	Season	Division	Apps	Goals	Apps	Goals	Apps	Goals	Apps	Goals	Apps	Goals
Raith Rovers	2015–16	Scottish Championship	1	0	0	0	0	0	0	0	1	0
Hibernian	2015–16	Scottish Championship	0	0	0	0	0	0	0	0	0	0
Hibernian	2016–17	Scottish Championship	1	0	0	0	0	0	0	0	1	0
Hibernian	2017–18	Scottish Premiership	0	0	0	0	0	0	—		0	0
Hibernian	2018–19	Scottish Premiership	10	0	1	0	0	0	0	0	11	0
Hibernian	2019–20	Scottish Premiership	2	0	1	0	2	0	—		5	0
Hibernian	2020–21	Scottish Premiership	2	0	0	0	3	0	—		5	0
Hibernian	2021–22	Scottish Premiership	0	0	0	0	0	0	—		0	0
Hibernian	Total		15	0	2	0	5	0	0	0	22	0
Berwick Rangers (loan)	2016–17	Scottish League Two	3	0	0	0	2	1	0	0	5	1
Hibernian U20/U21	2017–18	Development League	—		—		—		1 (Note: Appearances in the Scottish Challenge Cup for Hibernian under-20/under-21s in which age-restricted sides from the Scottish Premiership clubs compete against senior clubs)	0	1	0
Hibernian U20/U21	2018–19	Reserve League	—		—		—		1	1	1	1
Hibernian U20/U21	Total		—		—		—		2	1	2	1
Edinburgh City (loan)	2017–18	Scottish League Two	6	0	0	0	3	0	0	0	9	0
Dundee (loan)	2019–20	Scottish Championship	12	1	0	0	0	0	1 (Note: Appearance(s) in the Scottish Challenge Cup)	0	13	1
Raith Rovers (loan)	2021–22	Scottish Championship	7	0	1	0	0	0	1	0	9	0
Falkirk	2022–23	Scottish League One	21	0	3	0	5	0	2 (Note: One appearance in the Scottish Challenge Cup and one appearance in the Scottish Championship play-offs)	0	31	0
Falkirk	2023–24	Scottish League One	14	0	1	0	2	0	2	0	19	0
Falkirk	2024–25	Scottish Championship	20	3	2	0	6	1	1	0	29	4
Falkirk	2025–26	Scottish Premiership	1	0	0	0	2	0	0	0	3	0
Falkirk	Total		56	3	6	0	15	1	5	0	82	4
Ross County (loan)	2025–26	Scottish Championship	10	0	0	0	—		0	0	10	0
Arbroath	2026–27	Scottish Championship	3	0	0	0	1	0	0	0	4	0
Career total			113	4	9	0	26	2	9	1	157	7

== Honours ==
Raith Rovers

- Scottish Challenge Cup: 2021–22

Falkirk

- Scottish League One: 2023–24
- Scottish Championship: 2024–25
