= Luke Graham (footballer, born 2004) =

Scottish footballer (born 2004)

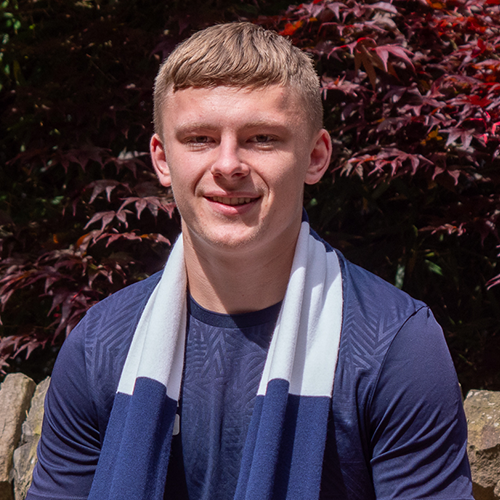
- Graham in 2024

Personal information
- Full name: Luke Robin Graham
- Date of birth: 11 February 2004 (age 22)
- Place of birth: Scone, Perth and Kinross, Scotland
- Height: 1.92 m (6 ft 4 in)
- Position: Centre-back

Team information
- Current team: Stoke City
- Number: 5

Youth career
- St Johnstone
- Dundee

Senior career*
Years	Team	Apps	(Gls)
2021–2026	Dundee	39	(2)
2021–2022	→ Lochee United (loan)	17	(0)
2022–2023	→ Albion Rovers (loan)	27	(2)
2023–2024	→ Montrose (loan)	30	(2)
2024	→ Falkirk (loan)	14	(0)
2025	→ Falkirk (loan)	9	(0)
2026–	Stoke City	14	(1)

International career^{‡}
2025–	Scotland U21	3	(0)
2026–	Scotland	3	(0)
- * Club domestic league appearances and goals as of 20:32, 21 November 2026 (UTC) ‡ National team caps and goals as of 22:45, 16 November 2026 (UTC)

Luke Robin Graham (born 11 February 2004) is a Scottish professional footballer who plays as a centre-back for EFL Championship side Stoke City and the Scotland national team.

== Club career ==
=== Early career ===
Born in Scone, Graham played grassroots football and was scouted by local club St Johnstone, where he spent several years before leaving after having issues with coaches and later joining Dundee's youth setup. At first, Graham was not sure about Dundee and returned to his boys' club but his parents later convinced him to try again at Dundee.

=== Dundee ===
In 2021, Graham joined Midlands League side Lochee United on a season-long loan. He would have a stand-out season for the Chee, winning the East Region League Cup with them and finishing 3rd in the league.

In April 2022, Graham would make headlines after it was reported he was set for a trial with Sheffield United. It was reported the following day that he was also being scouted by several bigger clubs such as Celtic, Rangers and Arsenal. Despite being offered a second trial by Sheffield United, Graham signed an extension with Dundee in May which would keep him there for another season.

On 30 September 2022, Graham joined Scottish League Two side Albion Rovers on loan. He would make his debut the following day. Graham would score his first goal for the club in his 2nd appearance, in a league win over Bonnyrigg Rose Athletic.

On 1 September 2023, Graham joined Scottish League One club Montrose on loan until January 2024. Graham made his debut the following day as a substitute in a league win away to Queen of the South. Graham scored his first goal for the Gable Endies on 4 November 2023, in a big league win away to Edinburgh City. After a successful first half of the season, Graham's loan to Montrose was extended until the end of the season. Graham had a strong season at Links Park, and was awarded both the Loanee and Young Player of the Year awards for Montrose at the end of the season.

After successive successful loan spells, Dundee announced on 28 May 2024 that Graham had been promoted to the first team squad, and had signed a contract extension to stay with the club until 2027. Graham made his competitive debut for the Dark Blues on 23 July as substitute in a Scottish League Cup group stage win over Annan Athletic. He made his first start for the Dee four days later in a 6–0 demolishing of Inverness Caledonian Thistle. Graham made his league debut for Dundee in a notable fixture, starting at Tannadice Park in a Dundee derby.

On 20 September 2024, Graham joined Scottish Championship club Falkirk on loan until the end of the season. Graham made his debut for the Bairns on 28 September in a league game away to Raith Rovers. On 28 December as a result of injuries at his parent club and a successful loan spell with Falkirk which saw them top of the table for Christmas, Dundee announced that they would recall Graham from Falkirk at the beginning of January. Just like his league debut with Dundee, Graham made his second league start after returning from loan in a Dundee derby.

On 4 February 2025, Graham returned to Falkirk on loan until the end of the season. On 2 May 2025, Graham started for the Bairns in a 3–1 home win over Hamilton Academical which confirmed Falkirk as winners of the 2024–25 Scottish Championship and their promotion to the Scottish Premiership.

On 26 July 2025, Graham scored his first goal for Dundee in a League Cup group stage win over Montrose. On 13 September, Graham scored his first league goal for the Dee to earn a point against Motherwell.

=== Stoke City ===
On 2 July 2026, Graham joined EFL Championship side Stoke City for an undisclosed fee on a four-year contract.

== International career ==
Graham was called up to the Scotland national under-21 football team for the first time on 11 March 2025. On 21 March, Graham made his debut for the Scotland national under-21 football team in an international friendly against Republic of Ireland U21, starting in a 0–2 victory at the Pinatar Arena in Spain. Graham was one of four young players invited to train with the Scotland squad ahead of the 2026 World Cup finals. He was named among the substitutes for a friendly against Curaçao on 30 May, but was unused in a 4–1 victory.

Graham received a second call-up for the national team in September 2026, in Sébastien Pocognoli's first squad as Scotland head coach, for the UEFA Nations League matches against Slovenia, Switzerland and North Macedonia. He made his full international debut on 3 October, as a substitute in a 2–0 win against North Macedonia.

== Career statistics ==
As of match played 21 November 2026

Appearances and goals by club, season and competition
Club	Season	League			National cup (Note: Includes FA Cup and Scottish Cup)		League cup (Note: Includes EFL Cup and Scottish League Cup)		Other		Total	
Club	Season	Division	Apps	Goals	Apps	Goals	Apps	Goals	Apps	Goals	Apps	Goals
Dundee B	2021–22	—			—		—		0	0	0	0
Dundee B	2023–24	—			—		—		2 (Note: Appearances in the Scottish Challenge Cup)	0	2	0
Dundee B	2024–25	—			—		—		1	0	1	0
Dundee B	Total				—		—		3	0	3	0
Dundee	2021–22	Scottish Premiership	0	0	0	0	0	0	—		0	0
Dundee	2022–23	Scottish Championship	0	0	0	0	0	0	—		0	0
Dundee	2023–24	Scottish Premiership	0	0	0	0	0	0	—		0	0
Dundee	2024–25	Scottish Premiership	3	0	0	0	2	0	—		5	0
Dundee	2025–26	Scottish Premiership	36	2	2	0	3	1	—		41	3
Dundee	Total		39	2	2	0	5	1	0	0	46	3
Lochee United (loan)	2021–22	Midlands League	17	0	0	0	0	0	4 (Note: Includes appearances in East of Scotland League Cup)	2	21	2
Albion Rovers (loan)	2022–23	Scottish League Two	27	2	2	0	—		2 (Note: Appearances in the Scottish League Two play-offs)	1	31	3
Montrose (loan)	2023–24	Scottish League One	30	2	2	0	—		2 (Note: Appearance(s) in the Scottish Championship play-offs)	0	34	2
Falkirk (loan)	2024–25	Scottish Championship	23	0	0	0	—		0	0	23	0
Stoke City	2026–27	EFL Championship	14	1	0	0	2	0	—		16	1
Career total			150	7	6	0	7	1	11	3	174	11

=== International ===
As of match played 16 November 2026

Appearances and goals by national team and year
National team	Year	Apps	Goals
Scotland	2026	3	0
Total		3	0

== Honours ==
Lochee United

- East Region Junior League Cup: 2021–22

Falkirk

- Scottish Championship: 2024–25

Individual

- Montrose Young Player of the Year: 2023–24
