= Leon McCann =

Scottish footballer

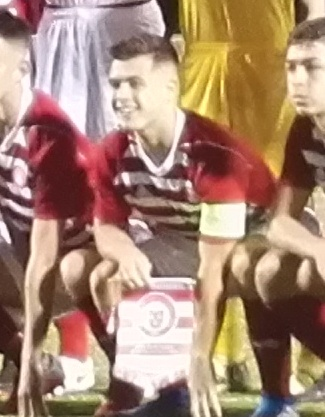
- McCann with Hamilton U19s, 2018

Personal information
- Full name: Leon McCann
- Date of birth: 16 March 2000 (age 26)
- Place of birth: Scotland
- Height: 5 ft 7 in (1.71 m)
- Position: Full-back

Team information
- Current team: Falkirk
- Number: 3

Youth career
- 2013–2019: Hamilton Academical

Senior career*
Years	Team	Apps	(Gls)
2019–2020	Hamilton Academical	0	(0)
2019–2020	→ Airdrieonians (loan)	14	(0)
2020–2021	Airdrieonians	28	(0)
2021–	Falkirk	145	(2)
- * Club domestic league appearances and goals as of 8 November 2026

Leon McCann (born 16 March 2000) is a Scottish professional footballer who plays as a full back for Scottish Premiership club Falkirk.

Having come through the Hamilton Academical youth system, McCann joined Airdrieonians in 2019 before moving to Falkirk in 2021. He was part of both their League One-winning "Invincibles" team in 2023–24 and their Scottish Championship-winning team in 2024–25.

== Club career ==
=== Hamilton Academical ===
McCann started off in the pro-youth system with Hamilton Academical aged 13, whilst attending Braidhurst High School in neighbouring Motherwell. He was captain when the Accies under-19s played in the 2018–19 UEFA Youth League and made four appearances across three seasons in the Scottish Challenge Cup for the under-20 side, but did not make a senior appearance for their first team.

=== Airdrieonians ===
Originally signing on a 5-month loan deal from Hamilton in August 2019, McCann signed an 18-month deal with Airdrieonians in early January 2020. He departed Airdrie in 2021 following the expiration of his contract at the club.

=== Falkirk ===
Falkirk won the race for McCann's signature in August 2021, offering the full-back a 3-year deal. He was part of Falkirk's 2023–24 "Invincible" League One-winning side, earning a two-year contract extension in February 2023, keeping him at the club until 2026. McCann then went on to be part of Falkirk's "Back to Back" 2024–25 Scottish Championship+winning side.

== Career statistics ==
As of 2 January 2026

Appearances and goals by club, season and competition
Club	Season	League			Scottish Cup		League Cup		Other		Total	
Club	Season	Division	Apps	Goals	Apps	Goals	Apps	Goals	Apps	Goals	Apps	Goals
Hamilton Academical	2019–20	Scottish Premiership	0	0	0	0	0	0	0	0	0	0
Airdrieonians (loan)	2019–20	Scottish League One	14	0	1	0	0	0	0	0	15	0
Airdrieonians	2019–20	Scottish League One	7	0	1	0	0	0	0	0	8	0
Airdrieonians	2020–21	Scottish League One	21	0	0	0	4	0	4 (Note: Appearances in the Scottish Championship Play-Offs)	0	29	0
Airdrieonians	Total		28	0	1	0	4	0	4	0	37	0
Falkirk	2021–22	Scottish League One	27	0	1	0	2	0	0	0	30	0
Falkirk	2022–23	Scottish League One	33	1	5	0	4	0	2 (Note: One Appearance in the Scottish Challenge Cup & one appearance in the Scottish Championship Play-Offs)	0	44	1
Falkirk	2023–24	Scottish League One	33	0	2	0	3	0	2 (Note: Appearances in the Scottish Challenge Cup)	0	40	0
Falkirk	2024–25	Scottish Championship	15	1	1	0	0	0	0	0	16	1
Falkirk	2025–26	Scottish Premiership	26	0	4	0	3	0	0	0	13	0
Falkirk	2026–27	Scottish Premiership	11	0	0	0	1	0	0	0	12	0
Falkirk	Total		145	2	13	0	13	0	4	0	155	2
Career Total			187	2	15	0	17	0	8	0	207	2

== Honours ==
Falkirk

- Scottish League One: 2023–24
- Scottish Championship: 2024–25

Individual

- PFA Scotland Team of the Year: 2023–24 Scottish League One
