= Finn Yeats =

Scottish footballer

Personal information
- Full name: Finn Yeats
- Date of birth: 19 April 2004 (age 22)
- Place of birth: Westhill, Scotland
- Height: 5 ft 10 in (1.78 m)
- Position: Midfielder

Team information
- Current team: Falkirk
- Number: 14

Youth career
- 2021–2022: Aberdeen

Senior career*
Years	Team	Apps	(Gls)
2022–	Falkirk	109	(2)
- * Club domestic league appearances and goals as of 20 May 2026

Finn Yeats (born 19 April 2004) is a Scottish professional footballer who plays as a midfielder for Scottish Premiership club Falkirk.

Having come through the Aberdeen youth system, Yeats was released in May 2022. After impressing on trial at St Johnstone, he was brought in to trial at Falkirk, impressing manager John McGlynn enough to earn a two-year deal.

== Club career ==
=== Aberdeen ===
Yeats came through Aberdeen's youth system and spent a season on loan at Highland League club Keith before being released in May 2022.

=== Falkirk ===
Falkirk snapped up Yeats after he impressed on trial in July 2022 earning a two-year contract with the then League One club. Despite being a midfielder, Yeats was deployed as an emergency Right-Back during Falkirk's 2022-23 & 2023-24 Scottish League One campaigns, earning a place in the 2023-24 PFA Scotland Team of the Year. Yeats was rewarded with a two-year deal in May 2024, keeping him at the club until 2026. In January 2026, Yeats scored his first Scottish Premiership goal for the club in a match against St Mirrren.

== Personal ==
Yeats is the son of former Keith, Huntly, Peterhead and Cove Rangers player, Craig Yeats. His uncle is former Scottish international Warren Cummings.

== Career statistics ==
As of 16 January 2026

Club	Season	League			FA Cup		League Cup		Other		Total	
Club	Season	Division	Apps	Goals	Apps	Goals	Apps	Goals	Apps	Goals	Apps	Goals
Falkirk	2022–23	Scottish League One	28	0	4	0	5	0	2 (Note: Appearances in the Scottish Championship Play-Offs)	0	39	0
Falkirk	2023–24	Scottish League One	34	0	2	0	4	0	2 (Note: Appearances in the Scottish Challenge Cup)	1	42	1
Falkirk	2024–25	Scottish Championship	27	0	1	0	6	1	0	0	34	1
Falkirk	2025–26	Scottish Premiership	6	1	0	0	0	0	0	0	6	1
Falkirk	2026–27	Scottish Premiership	6	0	0	0	2	0	0	0	8	0
Career Total			101	1	7	0	17	1	4	1	129	3

== Honours ==
Falkirk

- Scottish League One: 2023–24
- Scottish Championship: 2024–25

Individual

- PFA Scotland Team of the Year: 2023–24 Scottish League One
