= Tom Lang =

Scottish footballer

Personal information
- Full name: Thomas Lang
- Date of birth: 12 June 1997 (age 29)
- Place of birth: Oxford, England
- Height: 1.85 m (6 ft 1 in)
- Position: Defender

Team information
- Current team: Dumbarton
- Number: 5

Youth career
- 2010–2015: Birmingham City
- 2015–2016: Rangers

Senior career*
Years	Team	Apps	(Gls)
2017	Dumbarton	6	(0)
2017	Stranraer	3	(0)
2018–2019	Clyde	29	(0)
2019–2020	Dunfermline Athletic	0	(0)
2020	→ Clyde (loan)	7	(1)
2020–2021	Clyde	8	(0)
2021–2023	Raith Rovers	30	(1)
2023–	Falkirk	37	(4)
2026	→ Arbroath (loan)	3	(0)
2026–	Dumbarton	4	(0)

International career
2013–2014	Scotland U17s	10	(1)
Medal record
Scotland
UEFA European U-17 Championship
Bronze medal – third place	2014 Malta	Team competition
- * Club domestic league appearances and goals as of 19:05, 17 October 2026 (UTC)

Tom Lang (born 12 June 1997) is a Scottish footballer who plays as a defender for Scottish League Two side Dumbarton. He started his career as a youth player with Birmingham City and Rangers, and has also played for Stranraer, Clyde, Dunfermline Athletic, Raith Rovers, Falkirk and Arbroath.

== Career ==
Lang started his career with Birmingham City before joining Rangers in July 2015. He left Rangers in the summer of 2016 and after trial spells with Dundee United, Barnsley, QPR and Southend United, signed for Dumbarton in January 2017. He left the club in May 2017

He signed for Stranraer on 21 May 2017, however found his opportunities limited playing just six times. In December 2017 it was announced that he was leaving the blues along with Danny Stoney and Ryan Wallace, and joining Scottish League Two side Clyde. Lang made his debut against Annan Athletic in a 0–0 draw at Broadwood. After impressing with the club he signed an extended deal until the end of the 2018–19 season in February 2018.

After achieving promotion through the play-offs, Lang attracted the interest of Scottish Championship club Dunfermline Athletic. On 19 June 2019, he signed a two-year deal with the East End Park side. Lang was loaned back to Clyde in January 2020. After one season and one appearance, Lang left Dunfermline to re-sign for Clyde in October 2020.

Lang agreed a pre-contract deal with Raith Rovers in February 2021.

In June 2023, Lang signed a two-year contract with Falkirk. During his time with the club he helped them to win back-to-back promotions to return to the Scottish Premiership in 2025. Following the Bairns' promotion to the top flight, Lang spent a short spell on loan at Arbroath.

After leaving Falkirk, Lang returned to his first senior club Dumbarton in September 2026. Signing a deal until January with the Scottish League Two side.

== Personal life ==
Lang is the great-grandson of Newcastle United's FA Cup winner Tommy Lang.

== Career statistics ==
As of 19:05, 17 October 2026 (UTC)

Appearances and goals by club, season and competition
Club	Season	League			Scottish Cup		League Cup		Other		Total	
Club	Season	Division	Apps	Goals	Apps	Goals	Apps	Goals	Apps	Goals	Apps	Goals
Dumbarton	2016–17	Scottish Championship	6	0	0	0	0	0	0	0	6	0
Stranraer	2017–18	Scottish League One	3	0	0	0	2	0	1 (Note: Appearance in the Scottish Challenge Cup)	0	6	0
Clyde	2017–18	Scottish League Two	10	0	0	0	0	0	0	0	10	0
Clyde	2018–19	Scottish League Two	19	0	1	0	0	0	4 (Note: Appearances in the Scottish League One play-offs)	0	24	0
Clyde	Total		29	0	1	0	0	0	4	0	34	0
Dunfermline Athletic	2019–20	Scottish Championship	0	0	0	0	0	0	1	0	1	0
Clyde (loan)	2019–20	Scottish League Two	7	1	2	0	0	0	0	0	9	1
Clyde	2020–21	Scottish League Two	15	0	0	0	2	0	0	0	17	0
Raith Rovers	2021–22	Scottish Championship	16	0	2	0	0	0	2	0	20	0
Raith Rovers	2022–23	Scottish Championship	14	1	3	0	0	0	3	0	20	1
Raith Rovers	Total		30	1	5	0	0	0	5	0	40	1
Falkirk	2023–24	Scottish League One	26	3	2	0	4	2	4	1	36	6
Falkirk	2024–25	Scottish Championship	11	1	0	0	0	0	0	0	11	1
Falkirk	2025–26	Scottish Premiership	0	0	0	0	0	0	0	0	0	0
Falkirk	Total		37	4	2	0	4	2	4	1	47	7
Arbroath	2025–26	Scottish Championship	3	0	0	0	0	0	0	0	3	0
Dumbarton	2026–27	Scottish League Two	4	0	0	0	0	0	1	0	5	0
Career total			134	6	10	0	8	2	16	1	165	9

== Honours ==
Falkirk

- Scottish League One: 2023–24
- Scottish Championship: 2024–25

Individual

- PFA Scotland Team of the Year: 2023–24 Scottish League One
