= Keelan Adams =

Scottish footballer

Personal information
- Full name: Keelan Adams
- Date of birth: 13 November 2001 (age 24)
- Place of birth: North Berwick, East Lothian Scotland
- Position: Full back

Team information
- Current team: Falkirk
- Number: 2

Youth career
- 2023–2023: Glasgow University

Senior career*
Years	Team	Apps	(Gls)
2023–2024	Cumbernauld Colts		
2024-	Falkirk	60	(3)
2024	→ Cumbernauld Colts (loan)		
- * Club domestic league appearances and goals as of 20 May 2026

Keelan Adams (born 13 November 2001) is a Scottish professional footballer who plays as a full back for Scottish Premiership club Falkirk.

Adams previously played for Cumbernauld Colts and Glasgow University

== Club career ==
=== Falkirk ===
Adams signed for Falkirk on 2 February 2024 on a two-and-a-half year deal from Cumbernauld Colts, staying on loan at the Lowland League club for the remainder of the 2023–24 season. He then signed a one-year contract extension in November 2024 after an starting every game in the 2024-25 Scottish Championship, keeping him at the club until 2027.

== Career statistics ==
As of 30 December 2025

Club	Season	League			FA Cup		League Cup		Other		Total	
Club	Season	Division	Apps	Goals	Apps	Goals	Apps	Goals	Apps	Goals	Apps	Goals
Falkirk	2024–25	Scottish Championship	36	3	2	0	5	0	1 (Note: Appearance in 2024–25 Scottish Challenge Cup)	0	43	3
Falkirk	2025–26	Scottish Premiership	23	0	2	0	4	1	0	0	29	1
Falkirk	2026–27	Scottish Premiership	1	0	0	0	0	0	0	0	1	0
Total			60	3	2	0	9	1	1	0	73	4

== Honours ==
Falkirk

- Scottish Championship: 2024–25

Individual

- PFA Scotland Team of the Year: 2024–25 Scottish Championship
