= Liam Henderson (footballer, born August 1996) =

Scottish footballer

Personal information
- Full name: Liam Henderson
- Date of birth: 23 August 1996 (age 30)
- Place of birth: Edinburgh, Scotland
- Height: 6 ft 3 in (1.91 m)
- Position: Centre-back

Team information
- Current team: Falkirk
- Number: 5

Youth career
- 2014–2016: Heart of Midlothian

Senior career*
| Years | Team | Apps | (Gls) |
| 2014–2016 | Heart of Midlothian | 0 | (0) |
| 2015–2016 | → Stenhousemuir (loan) | 11 | (1) |
| 2016–2018 | Falkirk | 0 | (0) |
| 2017 | → Cowdenbeath (loan) | 17 | (0) |
| 2017–2018 | → Edinburgh City (loan) | 8 | (0) |
| 2018 | Stirling Macedonia | | |
| 2018–2021 | Edinburgh City | 64 | (12) |
| 2021–2022 | Arbroath | 25 | (1) |
| 2022– | Falkirk | 143 | (19) |
- * Club domestic league appearances and goals as of 8 November 2026

Liam Henderson (born 23 August 1996) is a Scottish professional footballer who plays as a central defender for Scottish Premiership club Falkirk.

Starting in the Hearts Academy in 2014, Henderson was released in 2016 and subsequently played for Falkirk, Stenhousemuir, Cowdenbeath, Edinburgh City and Arbroath before returning to Falkirk in 2022.

== Club career ==
=== Heart of Midlothian ===
Henderson started his career at Heart of Midlothian, making his one and only first team appearance for the club in a 4-1 defeat to Livingston in the Challenge Cup in August 2014.

=== Falkirk ===
Henderson signed for Falkirk following his release from Hearts in 2016, failing to make an appearance in two seasons at the club.

=== Edinburgh City ===
Following a loan to Cowdenbeath, Henderson joined Edinburgh City on loan in the 2017–18 season, but soon moved to Australia to join Stirling Macedonia. However, his spell in Australia was brief and he returned to Edinburgh City on a permanent basis in August 2018. Playing for three seasons in Scottish League Two and being on the losing side in two sets of Scottish League One play-off games, Henderson left the club at the end of the 2020–21 season.

=== Arbroath ===
Arbroath won the race for Henderson's signature for the 2021-22 Season, with Henderson playing 25 times, the team finishing second and participating in the Scottish Premiership play-offs. Ultimately, the team were beaten and Henderson left the club at the end of the season.

=== Return to Falkirk ===
Henderson returned to Falkirk as John McGlynn's first signing at the club for the 2022–23 Scottish League One season.

In 2023–24, Henderson was part of the "invincible" squad that went a whole Scottish League One season unbeaten, playing himself into the PFA Scotland League One Team of the Year alongside nine of his Falkirk team-mates.

Henderson then went on to achieve promotion from the Scottish Championship the following season, with Falkirk winning consecutive league titles, plus Henderson earning another PFA Scotland Team of the Year nomination.

On 8 November 20206, Henderson scored in the top corner in a 5-2 win against Hearts and several days later extended his contract until 2029. Falkirk have the contractual option of adding an extra year.

== Career statistics ==
As of 15 September 2026

Appearances and goals by club, season and competition
| Club | Season | League | | | Scottish Cup | | League Cup | | Other | | Total | |
| Club | Season | Division | Apps | Goals | Apps | Goals | Apps | Goals | Apps | Goals | Apps | Goals |
|---|---|---|---|---|---|---|---|---|---|---|---|---|
| Heart of Midlothian (loan) | 2014–15 | Scottish Championship | 0 | 0 | 0 | 0 | 0 | 0 | 1 (Note: Appearances in the Scottish Challenge Cup) | 0 | 1 | 0 |
| Stenhousemuir (loan) | 2015–16 | Scottish League One | 11 | 1 | 0 | 0 | 1 | 0 | 2 | 0 | 14 | 1 |
| Falkirk | 2016–17 | Scottish Championship | 0 | 0 | 0 | 0 | 0 | 0 | 0 | 0 | 0 | 0 |
| Falkirk | 2017–18 | Scottish Championship | 0 | 0 | 0 | 0 | 0 | 0 | 0 | 0 | 0 | 0 |
| Cowdenbeath (loan) | 2016–17 | Scottish League Two | 17 | 0 | 0 | 0 | 0 | 0 | 0 | 0 | 17 | 0 |
| Edinburgh City (loan) | 2017–18 | Scottish League Two | 8 | 0 | 0 | 0 | 0 | 0 | 0 | 0 | 8 | 0 |
| Edinburgh City | 2018–19 | Scottish League Two | 30 | 1 | 1 | 1 | 4 | 0 | 4 (Note: Three appearances in the Scottish Challenge Cup & one appearance in the Scottish League One Play-Offs) | 1 (Note: Goals in the Scottish Challenge Cup) | 38 | 3 |
| Edinburgh City | 2019–20 | Scottish League Two | 20 | 6 | 2 | 0 | 4 | 0 | 0 | 0 | 26 | 6 |
| Edinburgh City | 2020–21 | Scottish League Two | 14 | 5 | 2 | 0 | 4 | 0 | 2 (Note: Appearances in the Scottish League One Play-Offs) | 0 | 20 | 5 |
| Edinburgh City | Total | | 64 | 12 | 5 | 1 | 12 | 0 | 6 | 1 | 84 | 14 |
| Arbroath | 2021–22 | Scottish Championship | 25 | 1 | 2 | 0 | 4 | 0 | 3 (Note: One appearance in the Scottish Challenge Cup and two appearances in the Scottish Premiership Play-Offs) | 1 | 20 | 2 |
| Falkirk | 2022–23 | Scottish League One | 31 | 4 | 5 | 1 | 3 | 0 | 2 (Note: Appearances in the Scottish Championship Play-Offs) | 0 | 41 | 5 |
| Falkirk | 2023–24 | Scottish League One | 30 | 7 | 2 | 1 | 2 | 0 | 3 | 1 | 37 | 9 |
| Falkirk | 2024–25 | Scottish Championship | 35 | 6 | 2 | 0 | 6 | 1 | 1 | 0 | 44 | 7 |
| Falkirk | 2025–26 | Scottish Premiership | 34 | 1 | 4 | 0 | 5 | 0 | 0 | 0 | 43 | 1 |
| Falkirk | 2026–27 | Scottish Premiership | 13 | 1 | 0 | 0 | 4 | 1 | 0 | 0 | 17 | 2 |
| Falkirk | Total | | 136 | 18 | 13 | 2 | 20 | 1 | 6 | 1 | 175 | 22 |
| Career total | | | 261 | 32 | 20 | 3 | 37 | 2 | 17 | 3 | 335 | 45 |

== Honours ==
Falkirk

- Scottish League One: 2023–24
- Scottish Championship: 2024–25

Individual

- PFA Scotland Team of the Year: 2023–24 Scottish League One
- PFA Scotland Team of the Year: 2024–25 Scottish Championship
