= Ross MacIver =

Scottish footballer

Personal information
- Date of birth: 28 February 1999 (age 27)
- Place of birth: Inverness, Scotland
- Height: 6 ft 2 in (1.89 m)
- Position: Forward

Team information
- Current team: Falkirk
- Number: 9

Youth career
- –2017: Ross County

Senior career*
Years	Team	Apps	(Gls)
2017–2019	Ross County	0	(0)
2017	→ Wick Academy (loan)		
2018	→ Forfar Athletic (loan)	10	(1)
2019	→ Elgin City (loan)	15	(4)
2019–2021	Motherwell	8	(1)
2020–2021	→ Greenock Morton (loan)	6	(0)
2021	→ Partick Thistle (loan)	7	(2)
2021–2022	Partick Thistle	17	(0)
2022	→ Alloa Athletic (loan)	9	(1)
2022–2023	Alloa Athletic	36	(6)
2023–	Falkirk	72	(20)
- * Club domestic league appearances and goals as of 21:00, 19 September 2026 (UTC)

Ross MacIver (born 28 February 1999) is a Scottish professional footballer who plays as a forward for Scottish Premiership club Falkirk. He previously played for Ross County, Motherwell and Partick Thistle, and has spent time on loan at Wick Academy, Forfar Athletic, Elgin City, Greenock Morton and Alloa Athletic.

== Career ==
=== Ross County ===
MacIver came through the Ross County Academy and was part of the Ross County Under-20s team that won the 2016–17 SPFL Development League for the first time in the club's history. He made his first team debut in the 2018–19 Scottish Challenge Cup third round against Montrose coming on for the last 13 minutes of the match and taking home the man of the match reward for his outstanding efforts.

==== Loans ====
In January 2017, MacIver was loaned out to Highland Football League Club Wick Academy until the end of the season. On 26 January 2018, along with teammate Russell Dingwall, he was loaned to Scottish League One team Forfar Athletic until the end of the season. MacIver went on to score one goal in ten games for the club which caught the attention of premier league sides such as Aberdeen and Kilmarnock who were in desperate need of a predator type attacker.

In February 2019, MacIver joined Elgin City on loan for the remainder of the season.

=== Motherwell ===
Ahead of the 2019–20 season, having been released by Ross County, MacIver signed for Motherwell. He made his debut as a substitute on 26 December 2019, away to his former club Ross County, scoring Motherwell's equalising goal in a 2–1 win. This ended up being the only goal of his senior Motherwell career. In other performances he ran around efficiently which was highly commended by the Steelmen faithful .

MacIver joined Greenock Morton on a season-long loan in September 2020, but was recalled by Motherwell in January 2021. He was then loaned to Partick Thistle in March 2021. MacIver scored his first goal for Thistle in a 2–0 win away to Dumbarton, which sent Thistle top of League One.

=== Partick Thistle ===
MacIver joined Partick Thistle on a permanent basis after winning the League One title with the club, signing a one-year deal. On 28 February 2022, MacIver joined Scottish League One side Alloa Athletic on loan for the remainder of the 2021–22 season.

=== Alloa Athletic ===
After a successful loan spell MacIver joined Alloa Athletic on a permanent deal after being released by Partick Thistle.

=== Falkirk ===
MacIver joined Falkirk on a two year deal in May 2023. After winning the League One title with Falkirk, MacIver signed a two year contract extension with the club.

== Career statistics ==
As of match played 1 November 2025

Appearances and goals by club, season and competition
Club	Season	League			Cup		League Cup		Other		Total	
Club	Season	Division	Apps	Goals	Apps	Goals	Apps	Goals	Apps	Goals	Apps	Goals
Ross County Under 20s	2016–17	—	0	0	0	0	0	0	1 (Note: Appearances in the Scottish Challenge Cup)	0	1	0
Ross County Under 20s	2017–18	—	0	0	0	0	0	0	2	1	2	1
Ross County Under 20s	Total		0	0	0	0	0	0	3	1	3	1
Ross County	2017–18	Scottish Premiership	0	0	0	0	0	0	—		0	0
Ross County	2018–19	Scottish Championship	0	0	0	0	0	0	1	0	1	0
Ross County	Total		0	0	0	0	0	0	1	0	1	0
Forfar (loan)	2017–18	Scottish League One	10	1	0	0	0	0	0	0	10	1
Elgin (loan)	2018–19	Scottish League Two	15	4	0	0	0	0	0	0	15	4
Motherwell	2019–20	Scottish Premiership	7	1	1	0	0	0	—		8	1
Motherwell	2020–21	Scottish Premiership	1	0	0	0	0	0	—		1	0
Motherwell	Total		8	1	1	0	0	0	0	0	9	1
Greenock Morton (loan)	2020–21	Scottish Championship	6	0	0	0	3	1	0	0	9	1
Partick Thistle (loan)	2020–21	Scottish League One	7	2	1	0	0	0	0	0	8	2
Partick Thistle	2021–22	Scottish Championship	17	0	3	0	4	0	2	0	26	0
Alloa Athletic	2021–22	Scottish League One	9	1	0	0	0	0	0	0	9	1
Alloa Athletic	2022–23	Scottish League One	36	6	1	0	4	0	2 (Note: One appearance in the Scottish Challenge Cup and one in the Championship play-offs)	0	43	6
Alloa Athletic	Total		45	7	1	0	4	0	2	0	52	7
Falkirk	2023–24	Scottish League One	35	14	2	1	4	3	4	0	45	18
Falkirk	2024–25	Scottish Championship	20	3	2	0	6	4	1	0	29	7
Falkirk	2025–26	Scottish Premiership	10	3	0	0	5	1	—		15	4
Falkirk	Total		65	20	4	1	15	8	5	0	89	29
Career total			173	35	11	1	26	9	16	1	226	46

== Honours ==
Partick Thistle

- Scottish League One: 2020–21

Falkirk

- Scottish League One: 2023-24
- Scottish Championship: 2024–25
