= Nicky Hogarth =

Scottish footballer (born 2001)

Personal information
- Date of birth: 4 July 2001 (age 25)
- Place of birth: Falkirk, Scotland
- Height: 6 ft 5 in (1.95 m)
- Position: Goalkeeper

Team information
- Current team: Falkirk
- Number: 1

Youth career
- Rangers

Senior career*
Years	Team	Apps	(Gls)
2018–2021	Rangers	0	(0)
2018–2019	→ East Stirlingshire (loan)		
2019	→ Kilwinning Rangers (loan)		
2019–2020	→ Caledonian Braves (loan)		
2020	→ Stirling Albion (loan)	9	(0)
2020–2021	→ Cowdenbeath (loan)	14	(0)
2021–2023	Nottingham Forest	0	(0)
2022–2023	→ Falkirk (loan)	15	(0)
2023–	Falkirk	63	(0)
- * Club domestic league appearances and goals as of 20 May 2026

Nicky William Hogarth (born 4 July 2001) is a Scottish footballer who plays as a goalkeeper for Scottish Premiership club Falkirk. Added to games he played on loan at Stirling Albion and Cowdenbeath, he has made over 100 senior first team appearances.

== Club career ==
=== Rangers ===
Hogarth began his football career at Rangers, alongside his brother, Jay. On 26 November 2018, he gained first team experience by being loaned out to East Stirlingshire for the rest of the 2018–19 season.

Hogarth then went out on loan again to Kilwinning Rangers for two months and made his debut for the club, in a 3–1 loss against Renfrew. On 31 July 2019, he then joined Caledonian Braves on loan. Hogarth made his debut for the club, playing 30 minutes, in a 3–1 win against East Kilbride on 10 August 2019.

After his loan spell at Caledonian Braves ended, on 8 January 2020, Hogarth joined Stirling Albion on loan for the rest of the 2019–20 season. He made his debut for the club, starting a match, in a 3–2 win against Annan Athletic on 20 January 2020. After the match, Stirling Albion's manager Kevin Rutkiewicz praised Hogarth's debut performance and he was given the man of the match award. He kept his first clean sheet in the next match against Edinburgh City and helped the club win 1–0. Hogarth started in the next six matches for Stirling Albion. His time at the club was soon curtailed because of the COVID-19 pandemic. At the end of the 2019–20 season, he had made nine appearances in all competitions.

On 26 December 2020, Hogarth joined Cowdenbeath on a 7 day Emergency loan transfer. He made his debut for the club on the same day against Wick Academy in the first round of the Scottish FA Cup and kept a clean sheet, in a 2–0 win. His stay with Cowdenbeath was extended until the end of the 2020–21 season. Hogarth had to wait until 20 March 2021 to make another appearance for the club, keeping a clean sheet, in a 0-0 draw against Annan Athletic. Hogarth became a first choice goalkeeper for Cowdenbeath for the rest of the 2020–21 season. He successfully helped the club avoid relegation by finishing ninth place in the league. At the end of the 2020–21 season, Hogarth made sixteen appearances in all competitions. Following this, it was announced on 8 July 2021 that Hogarth was released by Rangers.

=== Nottingham Forest ===
On 13 July 2021, Hogarth joined English club Nottingham Forest on a free transfer and was assigned to the club's development squad.

He made his debut for Nottingham Forest's development squad in a 5–2 loss against Aston Villa's development squad on 13 August 2021. Hogarth became a first choice goalkeeper for the club's development squad. However, he received a red card "for handling outside the penalty area", in a 3–1 loss against Newcastle United's development squad. Despite this, however, Hogarth made twelve appearances for Nottingham Forest's development squad.

At the end of the 2022–23 season, Hogarth was released by the club. Reflecting on his time at Nottingham Forest, he said: "It was really good down in England. There was a lot of adjusting at first, living alone away from home. The training down there is different. There's kind of different focuses in terms of technically working within the goal, it's a lot of match realistic stuff every day. And the games are of a really good standard. You are playing against the up and coming from the Premiership and Championship from all across England, some really good players. People can sometimes knock the academy game and say it's not real football but definitely down south the standard is a different level."

=== Falkirk ===
On 11 August 2022, Hogarth returned to Scotland, joining Falkirk on loan until 3 January 2023. He made his debut for the club, starting the game, in a 3–1 win against Peterhead in the opening game of the season. Since joining Falkirk, Hogarth became a first choice goalkeeper throughout his loan spell at the club. On 4 January 2023, he returned to his parent club after manager John McGlynn hinted that Hogarth would not stay at Falkirk beyond January.

On 12 June 2023, Hogarth re-joined Falkirk on a free transfer. However in the 2023–24 season, he competed with Sam Long over the first choice goalkeeper role and the rotation saw both players get chances to start games with no established first choice goalkeeper for most of the season. Hogarth's first game after signing for the club on a permanent basis came on 5 September 2023 against Ayr United in the third round of the Scottish Challenge Cup and he kept a clean sheet, in a 1–0 win. By the end of the first half of the season, both keepers' contributions meant Falkirk had only conceded eleven goals so far in the league. By 30 March 2024, the club were confirmed as Scottish League One's champion. On 19 April 2024, he was one of ten Falkirk players to be included in the PFA Scotland Scottish League One Team of the Year.

== International career ==
In March 2022, Hogarth was called up to the Scotland U21 for the first time and appeared as an unused substitute.

== Personal life ==
Hogarth is the son of goalkeeper Myles Hogarth, who made over 100 appearances for Falkirk between 1999 and 2002, and the brother of goalkeeper Jay Hogarth. He attended Graeme High School. The pair played against each other, as Falkirk won 3–1 against Alloa Athletic on 18 October 2022. As a result. the pair became the third goalkeeping siblings who have faced each other in SPFL matches. Coincidentally, both brothers were wearing the 31 shirt number in the match.

== Career statistics ==
As of 9th June 2025

Appearances and goals by club, season and competition
Club	Season	League			Scottish Cup		League Cup		Other		Total	
Club	Season	Division	Apps	Goals	Apps	Goals	Apps	Goals	Apps	Goals	Apps	Goals
Stirling Albion	2019–20	Scottish League Two	9	0	0	0	0	0	0	0	9	0
Cowdenbeath	2020–21	Scottish League Two	14	0	1	0	0	0	0	0	14	0
Nottingham Forest	2021–22	Championship	0	0	0	0	0	0	0	0	0	0
Falkirk	2022–23	Scottish League One	15	0	1	0	1	0	0	0	22	0
Falkirk	2023–24	Scottish League One	18	0	1	0	3	0	3 (Note: Appearances in Scottish Challenge Cup)	0	25	0
Falkirk	2024–25	Scottish Championship	36	0	2	0	5	0	1	0	44	0
Falkirk	Total		69	0	4	0	9	0	4	0	86	0
Career total			92	0	5	0	9	0	4	0	110	0

== Honours ==
Falkirk

- Scottish League One: 2023–24

Individual

- PFA Scotland Team of the Year: 2023–24 Scottish League One
