= Liam Henderson (disambiguation) =

Liam Henderson (born 1996) is a Scottish footballer.

Liam Henderson may also refer to:

- Liam Henderson (English footballer) (born 1989), English semi-professional footballer
- Liam Henderson (field hockey) (born 2003), Australian ice hockey player
- Liam Henderson (footballer, born August 1996), Scottish footballer who plays for Falkirk
