= Sam Long (footballer, born 2002) =

Scottish footballer (born 2002)

Personal information
- Full name: Samuel James Long
- Date of birth: 12 November 2002 (age 24)
- Place of birth: Redbridge, England
- Position: Goalkeeper

Team information
- Current team: Salford City
- Number: 12

Senior career*
Years	Team	Apps	(Gls)
2020–2024	Lincoln City	1	(0)
2021	→ Gainsborough Trinity (loan)	1	(0)
2022	→ Drogheda United (loan)	15	(0)
2022–2023	→ Boston United (loan)	23	(0)
2023	→ Bromley (loan)	1	(0)
2023–2024	→ Falkirk (loan)	19	(0)
2024–2026	Bromley	4	(0)
2026–	Salford City	0	(0)
2026	→ Wealdstone (loan)	2	(0)
- * Club domestic league appearances and goals as of 22:30, 19 November 2026 (UTC)

Samuel James Long (born 12 November 2002) is a professional footballer who plays as a goalkeeper for EFL League Two club Salford City.

== Club career ==
=== Lincoln City ===
Born in Redbridge, London, England, Long began his football career at Crystal Palace, but he was released after being "told that he was too small". Following his release, Long had an unsuccessful trials after leaving Crystal Palace. Afterwards, he played for schools' football and Sunday league. After playing for the school's final, Long was scouted by Lincoln City and were impressed by his performance that they signed him.

While progressing through the Lincoln City's youth team, Long was named in 'The 11' by League Football Education, due to his "real commitment to his development, conducts himself impeccably at all times and is progressing in all areas of his apprenticeship". He signed his first professional contract on 1 October 2020. Throughout the 2020–21 season, Long was regularly featured on the substitute bench. He would make his Lincoln City debut against Manchester United U21 in the EFL Trophy on 24 August 2021, winning 3–2. Long made two more appearances in the EFL Trophy matches, coming against Bradford City and Sunderland. On 30 December 2021, he signed a new long-term contract until June 2025. Long made his league debut on 22 January 2022, against Plymouth Argyle following an injury to regular number one, Josh Griffiths.

==== Loan spells from Lincoln City ====
On 21 October 2021, Long would join Gainsborough Trinity on loan until January 2022. He made his debut for the club against Coalville Town on 30 October 2021 and kept a clean sheet, in a 3–0 win. However, his loan was cut short on 6 November 2021 and would return to play for his parent club in the FA Cup.

On 26 January 2022, Long would join Drogheda United on loan for their upcoming 2022 season. He made his debut for the club, starting the whole game, in a 3–0 loss against Sligo Rovers on 11 March 2022. Since joining Drogheda United, Long became a first-choice goalkeeper for the side, during which, he was able to keep three clean sheets following 15 appearances for the club. Long would return from his loan spell on 16 June 2022.

On 20 July 2022, Long joined Boston United on loan. He made his debut for the club, starting the whole game, in 2–0 loss against Gloucester City on 13 August 2022. Since joining Boston United, Long became a first choice goalkeeper for the club. However, he was recalled from his season loan on 13 January 2023.

On 31 January 2023, Long was sent on loan again, this time to Bromley. He made his debut for the club, starting the whole game, in a 2–1 loss against Wrexham on 18 March 2023. However, he was recalled on 25 March 2023 having played just one game for Bromley.

On 22 June 2023, Long joined Falkirk on loan for the 2023–24 season. However, he suffered an injury during the club's pre-season friendly tour. Long made his debut for Falkirk, starting the whole game, in a 2–1 win against The Spartans in the Scottish League Cup. In a follow-up Scottish League Cup match against Partick Thistle, he saved three penalty–shootout to win 7–6 on penalties after the game was played 120 minutes in a 2–2 draw. Since joining the club, Long competed with Nicky Hogarth over the first choice goalkeeper role and the rotation saw both players get chances to start games with no established first choice goalkeeper for most of the season. He captained Falkirk for the first time against Alloa Athletic on 26 August 2023 and helped the club win 4–1. By the end of the first half of the season, both keepers' contributions meant Falkirk had only conceded eleven goals so far in the league. On 30 March 2024, Long was the starting goalkeeper for the match against Montrose when he helped the club win 7–1 to confirm the Bairns as the Scottish League One's champion.

=== Bromley ===
On 3 July 2024, Long joined Bromley on a two-year deal for an undisclosed fee. He was released at the end of his contract.

=== Salford City ===
On 1 July 2026, Long joined League Two club Salford City on a two-year deal.

On 17 October 2026, he joined National League club Wealdstone on a twenty-eight day loan.

== International career ==
Long was called up to the England Men's Goalkeeping Development Camp at St George's Park in April 2021. On 18 March 2022, he was called up to the Scotland U21 side.

== Career statistics ==
As of 10 November 2026

Appearances and goals by club, season and competition
Club	Season	League			National Cup		League Cup		Other		Total	
Club	Season	Division	Apps	Goals	Apps	Goals	Apps	Goals	Apps	Goals	Apps	Goals
Lincoln City	2021–22	League One	1	0	2	0	0	0	3 (Note: Appearance(s) in EFL Trophy)	0	6	0
Lincoln City	2022–23	League One	0	0	0	0	0	0	0	0	0	0
Lincoln City	2023–24	League One	0	0	0	0	0	0	0	0	0	0
Lincoln City	Total		1	0	2	0	0	0	3	0	6	0
Gainsborough Trinity (loan)	2021–22	Northern Premier League	1	0	0	0	0	0	1 (Note: Appearance(s) in FA Trophy)	0	2	0
Drogheda United (loan)	2022	League of Ireland Premier Division	15	0	0	0	0	0	0	0	15	0
Boston United (loan)	2022–23	National League North	23	0	0	0	0	0	3	0	26	0
Bromley (loan)	2022–23	National League	1	0	0	0	0	0	0	0	1	0
Falkirk (loan)	2023–24	Scottish League One	19	0	1	0	4	0	1 (Note: Appearance(s) in Scottish Challenge Cup)	0	25	0
Bromley	2024–25	League Two	1	0	0	0	1	0	3	0	5	0
Bromley	2025–26	League Two	3	0	0	0	2	0	3	0	8	0
Bromley	Total		4	0	0	0	3	0	6	0	13	0
Salford City	2026–27	League Two	0	0	0	0	0	0	0	0	0	0
Wealdstone (loan)	2026–27	National League	2	0	1	0	0	0	1 (Note: Appearance(s) in National League Cup)	0	4	0
Career total			66	0	4	0	7	0	15	0	92	0

== Honours ==
Falkirk

- Scottish League One: 2023–24
