= Myles Hogarth =

Scottish footballer (born 1975)

Personal information
- Date of birth: 30 March 1975 (age 51)
- Place of birth: Falkirk, Scotland
- Position: Goalkeeper

Senior career*
Years	Team	Apps	(Gls)
1996–1999	Heart of Midlothian	1	(0)
1997	→ Airdrieonians (loan)	12	(0)
1997–1998	→ Hamilton Academical (loan)	5	(0)
1999–2002	Falkirk	108	(0)
2002–2003	Alloa Athletic	8	(0)
2003–2010	Stirling Albion	197	(0)
2010	Camelon F.C.		
- * Club domestic league appearances and goals

Myles Hogarth (born 30 March 1975) is a Scottish professional footballer, who played as a goalkeeper for several Scottish league clubs. He is currently the goalkeeping coach at Stenhousemuir. Myles has two sons, both of whom are goalkeepers - Nicky Hogarth who plays for Myles' former club Falkirk and Jay Hogarth who plays for Rangers B.

== Career ==
Hogarth started his career with Hearts making his only competitive appearance for the club in May 1996, before he went on a three-month loan to Airdrieonians. Hogarth made his professional league debut on 13 September 1997 against Greenock Morton. After his loan expired with Airdrieonians Hogarth went on loan to Hamilton Academical for the remainder of the 1997/98 season making his debut for Hamilton on 20 December 1997 against Raith Rovers. After returning to Hearts at the end of the 1997/98 season Hogarth was released and signed with Falkirk. Hogarth made his debut for Falkirk on 10 April 1999 against his former club Airdrieonians. Hogarth made over 100 appearances for Falkirk before he moved to Alloa Athletic in 2003. Hogarth made his debut against Inverness Caledonian Thistle on 3 August 2002. Hogarth only featured in eight games for Alloa Athletic before he was released by the club to enable him to join local rivals Stirling Albion who were in the grip of a goalkeeper crisis with their experienced goalkeeper Chris Reid being injured this only left Stirling Albion with 19-year-old goalkeeper Anton Nugent before Hogarth joined the club. Hogarth made his debut for Stirling Albion on 11 March 2003 against Greenock Morton. Hogarth made over 150 appearances for Stirling Albion he then lost his place to keeper Scott Christie taking the number one Jersey.

== Personal life ==
Myles being a goalkeeper in his day by trade his younger son Jay Hogarth plays as a goalkeeper for Rangers B' team and currently is on loan to Stenhousemuir rivals Dumbarton and also has older son Nicky Hogarth as a goalkeeper at Falkirk the two of them were on the books together through the rangers academy ranks.
