= Calvin Miller =

Scottish footballer (born 1998)

- Miller in 2026

Personal information
- Date of birth: 9 January 1998 (age 28)
- Place of birth: Glasgow, Scotland
- Height: 6 ft 0 in (1.82 m)
- Positions: Full-back; winger

Team information
- Current team: Heart of Midlothian
- Number: 7

Youth career
- 2010–2018: Celtic

Senior career*
Years	Team	Apps	(Gls)
2016–2020	Celtic	4	(0)
2018	→ Dundee (loan)	16	(1)
2019	→ Ayr United (loan)	13	(1)
2020–2021	Harrogate Town	10	(1)
2021	→ Notts County (loan)	17	(0)
2021–2022	Chesterfield	40	(1)
2023	Greenock Morton	15	(1)
2023–2026	Falkirk	105	(26)
2026–	Heart of Midlothian	10	(4)

International career^{‡}
2012	Scotland U15	1	(0)
2012–2013	Scotland U16	12	(2)
2013–2015	Scotland U17	13	(1)
2018	Scotland U20	1	(0)
2019	Scotland U21	1	(0)
Medal record
Scotland
UEFA European U-17 Championship
Bronze medal – third place	2014 Malta	Team competition
- * Club domestic league appearances and goals as of 25 October 2026 ‡ National team caps and goals as of 00:31, 23 March 2019 (UTC)

Calvin Darren Miller (born 9 January 1998) is a Scottish footballer who plays as a left-back or winger for Scottish Premiership club Heart of Midlothian.

Miller has previously played for Celtic, Dundee, Ayr United, Harrogate Town, Notts County, Chesterfield, Greenock Morton and Falkirk.

== Club career ==
=== Celtic ===
Having attended training sessions at Rangers, Miller signed for Celtic in 2010, aged 12.

In addition to domestic tournaments (he was in the squad which won the Scottish Youth Cup in 2015, and started and scored in the competition's 2017 final), Miller featured in several international youth tournaments during his Celtic youth career such as the NextGen Series and the UEFA Youth League. In May 2016 he was named in a matchday squad for the first time and also signed a new contract running until 2019. Earlier that year he had been marked by the Scottish press as one of the 'three to watch' from the youth team.

Miller made his league and competitive debut against Partick Thistle on 20 December 2016. He received praise for his performance in the match, which Celtic won. It was at this point that his manager Brendan Rodgers revealed that Miller, who had previously been considered a winger or forward in his youth career with the club, was retraining in a more defensive position. Rodgers also expressed his hope that Miller could flourish in his new role in a similar manner to his previous trainee Ryan Bertrand.

He did not feature for the senior team again until 8 August 2017, when he played the full 90 minutes in a 5–0 win over Kilmarnock in the Scottish League Cup, with regular left-back Kieran Tierney filling in as a central defender.

Miller started at left-back on 19 August 2017 in the Scottish Premiership, again against Kilmarnock, and was given man of the match by Sky Sports. His side won 2–0 with goals from James Forrest and Callum McGregor. He was selected in further home fixtures against St Johnstone in February 2018 and Kilmarnock again in May, being replaced in the second half by Tierney in both matches, which ended in 0–0 draws after Celtic made several other changes which appeared to affect their rhythm as a unit.

Miller signed a new contract with Celtic in August 2018, tying him to the club until summer 2020 with the possibility of extension. Speaking on his future, he stated that his short-term aim was to secure a loan move to gain further experience.

==== Dundee loan ====
On 31 August 2018, Miller moved to fellow Premiership club Dundee on loan. He made his debut from the bench on 1 September in a 3–1 home defeat to Motherwell. On 23 October, he missed an opportunity to score his first senior goal when he sent a penalty kick wide of the post in an eventual 3–0 defeat to Heart of Midlothian. On 18 December he did score, netting Dundee's consolation goal in a 5–1 loss away to Aberdeen. His loan, intended originally to be for the full season, was curtailed at the end of December 2018.

==== Ayr United loan ====
On 31 January 2019, Miller joined Scottish Championship club Ayr United on loan until the end of the 2018–19 season.

==== Return, injury and release ====
Having returned to Celtic in summer 2019 Miller spoke of his hope of being in the plans of Neil Lennon, Celtic's new manager who had used Miller in friendly matches in his previous spell in charge of the club. However, when Kieran Tierney was sold in August 2019, Miller was overlooked at left back for a UEFA Champions League qualifier against CFR Cluj, the position instead being taken by midfielder Callum McGregor – who put in an uncertain performance as Celtic lost at home and were eliminated from the competition. Miller then turned down a move to Kilmarnock as part of a deal to bring Greg Taylor (also a left back) to Celtic, a signing which, along with improvement in the form of Boli Bolingoli, another new signing in the same position, further diminished the chances of Miller being selected. The slight prospect then disappeared entirely after Miller was injured in a reserve match on 17 September, requiring surgery the following week which would rule him out until the end of the season (and the end of his Celtic contract) with no opportunity to impress the manager within the club or out on loan. His departure was confirmed in May 2020.

=== Harrogate Town ===
English club Harrogate Town signed Miller on 3 October 2020.

==== Notts County (loan) ====
On 11 January 2021, Miller joined National League side Notts County on loan for the remainder of the 2020–21 season.

=== Chesterfield ===
On 25 June 2021, Miller agreed to return to the National League to join Chesterfield upon the expiration of his contract with Harrogate. On 13 October 2022, Miller had his contract terminated by mutual consent.

=== Greenock Morton ===
On 2 January 2023, Miller signed with Scottish Championship side Greenock Morton until the end of the season. He scored his first and only goal for the club in a 2–2 draw with Inverness Caledonian Thistle, before leaving in June 2023.

=== Falkirk ===
After leaving Morton, Miller signed for Scottish League One club Falkirk. In March 2024, Miller won the League One title with the Bairns on the same night they defeated Montrose 7–1 at Links Park. Miller would be named to the PFA Scotland League One Team of the Year in April 2024.

On 2 August 2024, Miller scored in Falkirk's first game back in the Scottish Championship in a win over Queen's Park. In April 2025, Miller was among four Falkirk players named to the PFA Scotland Championship Team of the Year. On 2 May 2025, Miller started and scored his 10th league goal of the season in a 3-1 home win over Hamilton Academical to confirm Falkirk as Scottish Championship winners, winning back-to-back titles and earning the Bairns promotion to the Scottish Premiership. Miller capped off a brilliant season with being awarded the SPFL's Scottish Championship Player of the Year.

=== Heart of Midlothian ===
On 4 June 2026, Miller signed for Scottish Premiership side Heart of Midlothian on a three year deal for an undisclosed fee.

He made his debut for the club, starting the whole game, in a 4-0 loss against Sturm Graz in the first leg of the UEFA Champions League's second qualifying round. Miller made his league debut for Hearts, starting the whole game, in a 2-1 loss against Aberdeen in the opening game of the season. A week later on 8 August 2026, he scored his first goal for the club, in a 4-0 win against Dundee United. A week later on 16 August 2026, Miller scored once again, in a 4-0 win against Inverness CT in the second round of the Scottish League Cup In the return leg against Rapid Wien in the play-off round of UEFA Conference League, he scored his first European goal and played the whole game to a 2-2 draw and was four out of the Hearts players to successfully converted a penalty shootout, as the club went on to win 4-3.

== International career ==
Miller was selected for Scotland at various youth levels. He made his debut for the under-21 team in March 2019.

== Personal life ==
Miller was born in Glasgow and grew up in the city's Castlemilk district. He is the father of two daughters, Olivia and Mia, born in 2015 and 2021.

== Career statistics ==
As of 5 November 2026

Appearances and goals by club, season and competition
Club	Season	League			Cup		League Cup		Other		Total	
Club	Season	Division	Apps	Goals	Apps	Goals	Apps	Goals	Apps	Goals	Apps	Goals
Celtic	2016–17	Scottish Premiership	1	0	0	0	0	0	0	0	1	0
Celtic	2017–18	Scottish Premiership	3	0	0	0	1	0	0	0	4	0
Celtic	2018–19	Scottish Premiership	0	0	0	0	0	0	0	0	0	0
Celtic	2019–20	Scottish Premiership	0	0	0	0	0	0	0	0	0	0
Celtic	Total		4	0	0	0	1	0	0	0	5	0
Celtic Under-20s (Note: Refers to matches in the Scottish Challenge Cup, in which teams from the SPFL Development League compete against senior clubs)	2016–17	SPFL Development League	—		—		—		3	0	3	0
Celtic Under-20s	2019–20	SPFL Development League	—		—		—		2	0	2	0
Dundee (loan)	2018–19	Scottish Premiership	16	1	0	0	0	0	0	0	16	1
Ayr United (loan)	2018–19	Scottish Championship	13	1	0	0	0	0	1 (Note: Appearance in the SPFL Premiership/Championship promotion playoffs)	0	14	1
Harrogate Town	2020–21	League Two	10	1	2	1	0	0	1 (Note: Appearance(s) in the EFL Trophy)	0	13	2
Notts County (loan)	2020–21	National League	19	0	0	0	0	0	4 (Note: Appearance(s) in the FA Trophy)	0	23	0
Chesterfield	2021–22	National League	36	1	4	0	0	0	0	0	40	1
Chesterfield	2022–23	National League	6	0	0	0	0	0	0	0	6	0
Chesterfield	Total		42	1	4	0	0	0	0	0	46	1
Greenock Morton	2022–23	Scottish Championship	15	1	1	0	0	0	0	0	16	1
Falkirk	2023–24	Scottish League One	31	9	2	1	4	1	3 (Note: Appearance(s) in the Scottish Challenge Cup)	0	40	11
Falkirk	2024–25	Scottish Championship	36	10	2	1	6	0	1	1	45	12
Falkirk	2025–26	Scottish Premiership	38	7	4	0	5	2	0	0	47	9
Falkirk	Total		105	26	8	2	15	3	4	1	132	32
Heart of Midlothian	2026–27	Scottish Premiership	10	4	0	0	3	2	8 (Note: Two appearances in the UEFA Champions League, two appearances in the UEFA Europa League, two appearances and one goal in the UEFA Conference League)	1	21	7
Heart of Midlothian	Total		10	4	0	0	3	2	8	1	21	7
Career total			234	35	15	3	19	5	23	2	291	45

== Honours ==
Falkirk

- Scottish League One: 2023–24
- Scottish Championship: 2024–25

Individual

- PFA Scotland Team of the Year: 2023–24 Scottish League One
- PFA Scotland Team of the Year: 2024–25 Scottish Championship
- SPFL Scottish Championship Player of the Year: 2024–25
