= Intermoor =

- Type: Private limited (Non-trading)
- Industry: Subsea Services
- Founded: Morgan City, Louisiana (2004)
- Headquarters: Houston, Texas, United States
- Area served: Global
- Key people: David McGuire, Global President
- Number of employees: 300
- Website: https://acteon.com/solutions/business-lines/intermoor

Intermoor, Acteon’s Moorings and Anchors business line, delivers tailored mooring solutions focused on the design and installation of both permanent and temporary mooring systems. Their engineered solutions include for both types of moorings:

- Concept engineering
- Pre-FEED and FEED studies
- Detailed engineering
- Mooring analysis
- Anchor selection and design
- Risk and cost analysis
- Installation efficiency optimization
- Pre-laid mooring installation
- Mooring repair and replacement
- Mooring system monitoring
- Fatigue monitoring and evaluation
- Data management / digital twin
- Mooring integrity management
- Life extension engineering
- Mooring and riser decommissioning

Intermoor has offices and shorebases in the United States, Brazil, South East Asia, Norway, and United Kingdom.

== History ==
In November 2004, Acteon acquired the business and assets of Technip Offshore Moorings, Inc. The company was renamed Intermoor Inc. and later merged with sister Acteon companies International Mooring Systems and Trident Offshore.

In 2006, Intermoor created the subsidiary Intermoor do Brasil and opened an office in Brazil.

In June 2010, Acteon acquired IOS Offshore, which became the Norwegian arm of Intermoor. Formed in 1986 with an office and workshop on NorSea’s Dusavik base in Stavanger, IOS began as a mooring equipment supply company to the offshore oil industry.

Intermoor opened its Morgan City facility in Louisiana, USA, on March 24, 2011.

Intermoor acquired Viking Sea Tech in 2017 and Bruce Anchor in 2018 as well as the intellectual property of BEL Grapnel & Chaser.

In 2025, Intermoor entered a strategic alliance with Jumbo Offshore.

Intermoor operates shore base services from Morgan City and Fourchon in Louisiana, USA as well as from Montrose in Scotland and from the Açu Superport in Brazil. from offices in the USA, Singapore, Malaysia, Brazil, Angola, Norway, Mexico and the UK.

Intermoor has been the current world record depth holder for a conventional drilling rig mooring installation at a water depth of 2570m since 2010.

== Activities ==
Intermoor was among the first to utilize polyester fiber mooring ropes in an offshore mooring system with the Red Hawk Cell-Spar Mooring installed in 2003 for Kerr McGee. Intermoor became the first company to decommission a permanent floating structure in the US Gulf of Mexico when in 2015 they removed from service the Red Hawk Cell-Spar and artificially reefed it as part of the rigs to reefs program., In 2024, Intermoor completed the disconnection, removal and towing of the Chevron Pattani FPSO in the Gulf of Thailand. Intermoor is involved in the commissioning and installation phases of moorings and risers, and the abandonment and decommissioning efforts as well.

Intermoor pioneered the design of suction piles for use as a deepwater anchors in the 1990s, and has been a part of the design, fabrication, or installation of well over 90 suction piles in the global offshore oil and gas market.

Intermoor patented the SEPLA (Suction Embedded Plate Anchor), an anchor that combines the precise positioning of suction piles with the simplicity of plate anchors. In 2021, the SEPLA received BSEE and ABS approval for permanent moorings.
