= Ryan Shanley =

Scottish footballer

Personal information
- Date of birth: 16 January 2001 (age 25)
- Place of birth: Edinburgh, Scotland
- Position: Striker

Team information
- Current team: Kelty Hearts
- Number: 29

Youth career
- Hibernian

Senior career*
Years	Team	Apps	(Gls)
2020–2021	Hibernian	1	(0)
2019	→ Civil Service Strollers (loan)		
2020	→ Forfar Athletic (loan)	1	(0)
2020–2021	→ Kelty Hearts (loan)	3	(2)
2021	→ Finn Harps (loan)	8	(0)
2021	→ Edinburgh City (loan)	28	(7)
2021–2024	Edinburgh City	43	(10)
2024	Falkirk	24	(2)
2025–2026	Stirling Albion	45	(15)
2026–	Kelty Hearts	6	(1)
- * Club domestic league appearances and goals as of 19 October 2026

Ryan Shanley (born 16 January 2001) is a Scottish professional footballer who plays as a striker for Scottish League Two club Kelty Hearts. He came through the youth ranks of Hibernian and has previously played for Hibs, as well as having loan spells with Civil Service Strollers, Forfar Athletic, Kelty Hearts, Finn Harps and Edinburgh City. After leaving Hibs, Shanley played for Edinburgh City, Falkirk and Stirling Albion.

== Club career ==
=== Hibernian ===
Shanley joined Hibernian at under-15 level and progressed through the youth ranks. In January 2020 he signed a two-year contract with the club. He previously spent time on loan with Civil Service Strollers and Forfar Athletic. He made one appearance for Forfar, in a 6–0 defeat at Falkirk on 25 January 2020.

In September 2020, he made his professional debut as a late substitute in a 3–0 win at St Mirren. Shanley moved on loan to Kelty Hearts in December 2020. Shanley returned to Hibs in January 2021 due to the suspension of football in the Scottish lower leagues. Shanley was then loaned to Irish club Finn Harps, ahead of the 2021 season starting in March. He made his debut in the opening game of the season as his side won 1–0 at home to Bohemians on 20 March 2021. Shanley's loan spell was cut short on 10 May 2021 after making just 1 start for the club and failing to score in 8 appearances.

Shanley moved on loan to Edinburgh City in June 2021 on a deal due to run for the whole of the 2021–22 season. This loan arrangement was cut short when Shanley was released by Hibs in August 2021.

=== Edinburgh City ===
Following his release by Hibs, Shanley signed for Edinburgh City on 2 September 2021. On 28 January 2023, during a match against Falkirk, Shanley suffered a concussion and lay unconscious for 30 seconds. He returned on 18 March 2023 in a match against Dunfermline Athletic.

=== Falkirk ===
After helping Falkirk achieve promotion to the Scottish Championship in the 2023–24 season, Shanley left the club by mutual consent on 4 December 2024.

=== Stirling Albion ===
On 2 January 2025, Shanley signed for Scottish League Two side Stirling Albion.

=== Kelty Hearts ===
On 13 May 2026, Scottish League Two side Kelty Hearts announced that Shanley had returned to his former club.

== Honours ==
Falkirk

- Scottish League One: 2023–24

== Career statistics ==
As of match played 30 April 2021

Appearances and goals by club, season and competition
Club	Season	League			Scottish Cup		League Cup		Other		Total	
Club	Season	Division	Apps	Goals	Apps	Goals	Apps	Goals	Apps	Goals	Apps	Goals
Hibernian	2019–20	Scottish Premiership	0	0	0	0	0	0	—		0	0
Hibernian	2020–21	Scottish Premiership	1	0	0	0	1	0	—		2	0
Hibernian	Total		1	0	0	0	1	0	0	0	2	0
Civil Service Strollers (loan)	2019–20	Lowland League			—		—		—			
Forfar Athletic (loan)	2019–20	Scottish League One	1	0	—		—		—		1	0
Kelty Hearts (loan)	2020–21	Lowland League	3	2	—		—		—		3	2
Finn Harps (loan)	2021	League of Ireland Premier Division	8	0	—		—		—		8	0
Career total			13	2	0	0	1	0	0	0	14	2

== Personal life ==
Shanley is the cousin of former Hibernian and Scotland striker Derek Riordan.
