= Jordan Allan =

Scottish footballer

Personal information
- Date of birth: 20 October 1998 (age 28)
- Place of birth: Blantyre, Scotland
- Position: Striker

Team information
- Current team: Stirling Albion
- Number: 9

Youth career
- 2006–2012: Airdrie United

Senior career*
Years	Team	Apps	(Gls)
2013–2014	Airdrieonians	1	(0)
2014–2018	Wolverhampton Wanderers	0	(0)
2017	→ Airdrieonians (loan)	9	(0)
2018–2020	Cowdenbeath	44	(14)
2020–2021	Forfar Athletic	18	(3)
2021–2022	Airdrieonians	26	(3)
2022–2023	Clyde	21	(10)
2023–2025	Falkirk	27	(3)
2024	→ Clyde (loan)	19	(8)
2025	→ Queen of the South (loan)	16	(5)
2025-2026	Queen of the South	9	(2)
2026-	Stirling Albion	16	(7)
- * Club domestic league appearances and goals as of 4 May 2026

Jordan Allan (born 20 October 1998) is a Scottish footballer who plays for Scottish League One club Stirling Albion. He has previously played for Airdrieonians, Wolverhampton Wanderers, Cowdenbeath, Forfar Athletic, Clyde (two spells) Falkirk. and Queen Of The South

== Career ==
In April 2013, Allan made his debut for Scottish club Airdrie United as a substitute against Livingston in a 2–0 defeat. Still a pupil at Calderside Academy and aged just 14 years and 189 days, Allan became the youngest player to represent a first team in the Scottish Football League, and Britain, breaking the record previously established by Reuben Noble-Lazarus in January 2008; (the British record stood for almost a decade before being broken by Christopher Atherton from Northern Ireland) but the SFL record will never be bettered as the organisation was replaced by the Scottish Professional Football League a few months later.

In May 2014, Allan signed for Wolverhampton Wanderers. On 30 August 2017 he returned to his former club Airdrieonians on a six-month loan deal. Allan was released by Wolves at the end of the 2017–18 season.

He signed for Scottish League Two club Cowdenbeath in November 2018, and then moved to Forfar Athletic during August 2020. Allan returned to Airdrie in June 2021.

Allan joined Scottish League One club Clyde in the summer of 2022, and had a very successful 6 months with the Bully Wee in which he scored ten league goals by the midway point and won the League One player of the month for November 2022.

On 26 January 2023, Allan move to league rivals Falkirk for an undisclosed fee and signed a two-and-a-half-year deal with the Bairns. In January 2024, Allan returned to Clyde on loan until the end of the season.

After a successful loan spell which included a Player of the Month award for the Scottish League One in April, Allan signed a pre-contract agreement on 8 May 2025 to join Queen of the South on a one-year deal.

With a lack of game time due to injury Allan struggled forcing a Summer move to Stirling Albion.

== Honours ==
Falkirk

- Scottish League One: 2023-24
