= Alfredo Agyeman =

Ghanaian footballer (born 2000)

Personal information
- Date of birth: 15 March 2000 (age 26)
- Place of birth: Accra, Ghana
- Height: 1.82 m (6 ft 0 in)
- Positions: Winger; forward

Team information
- Current team: Zabbar St. Patrick’s
- Number: 33

Youth career
- –2018: Motherwell

Senior career*
Years	Team	Apps	(Gls)
2018	Motherwell	0	(0)
2018	→ East Kilbride (loan)		
2019–2020	Queen's Park	14	(0)
2020–2021	Broomhill		
2021–2023	Kelty Hearts	70	(15)
2023–2026	Falkirk	83	(11)
2026	→ St Johnstone (loan)	9	(1)
2026-	Zabbar St. Patrick’s		
- * Club domestic league appearances and goals as of 20 May 2026

Alfredo Agyeman (born 15 March 2000) is a Ghanaian professional footballer who plays as a winger or forward for Maltese team Zabbar St. Patrick’s.

== Early life ==
Agyeman was born on 15 March 2000 in Accra, Ghana to Charles and Felicia Agyeman. At the age of three, he moved with his family to Italy.

== Career ==
As a youth player, Agyeman joined the youth academy of Scottish side Motherwell and was promoted to the club's reserve team in 2018, being offered a new contract at the end of the 2017–18 season.

On 26 October 2018, Agyeman joined East Kilbride on loan until January 2019. At the end of his loan deal with East Kilbride in January 2019, Agyeman left Motherwell after his contract expired.

Following his release from Motherwell, Agyeman signed for Scottish side Queen's Park. One year later, he signed for Scottish side Broomhill.

Subsequently, he signed for Scottish side Kelty Hearts in 2021, helping the club achieve promotion from the fourth tier to the third tier.

In 2023, he signed for Scottish side Falkirk, helping the club achieve promotion from the third tier to the second tier. In April 2024, Agyeman signed a two-year contract extension, keeping him at the club until June 2027. After sporadic appearances in the Scottish Premiership through 2025, Agyeman joined St Johnstone for the remainder of the 2025–26 Scottish Championship campaign.
