= 2024–25 Scottish Championship =

Scottish Championship
- Season: 2024–25
- Dates: 2 August 2024 – 2 May 2025
- Champions: Falkirk
- Promoted: Falkirk; Livingston
- Relegated: Hamilton Academical
- Matches: 180
- Goals: 452 (2.51 per match)
- Top goalscorer: Brian Graham; 15 goals
- Biggest home win: Falkirk 6–0 Greenock Morton (2 November 2024)
- Biggest away win: Queen's Park 0–5 Airdrieonians (2 April 2025)
- Highest scoring: Ayr United 5–2 Falkirk (14 December 2024); Falkirk 5–2 Partick Thistle (8 February 2025)
- Longest winning run: Falkirk; 5 games
- Longest unbeaten run: Greenock Morton; 11 games
- Longest winless run: Airdrieonians; 19 games
- Longest losing run: Airdrieonians; Queen's Park; 7 games
- Highest attendance: 8,558; Dunfermline Athletic 3–3 Falkirk (27 December 2024)
- Lowest attendance: 881; Queen's Park 1–1 Livingston (9 August 2024)
- Total attendance: 570,667
- Average attendance: 3,170
- All statistics correct as of 2 May 2025.

The 2024–25 Scottish Championship (known as the William Hill Championship for sponsorship reasons) was the twelfth season of the Scottish Championship, the second tier of Scottish football. The season began on 2 August 2024 and concluded on 2 May 2025.

Ten teams contested the league: Airdrieonians, Ayr United, Dunfermline Athletic, Falkirk, Greenock Morton, Hamilton Academical, Livingston, Partick Thistle, Queen's Park and Raith Rovers.

== Teams ==
The following teams changed division after the 2023–24 season.

=== To Championship ===
Promoted from League One

- Falkirk
- Hamilton Academical

Relegated from the Premiership

- Livingston

=== From Championship ===
Relegated to League One

- Arbroath
- Inverness Caledonian Thistle

Promoted to the Premiership

- Dundee United

=== Stadia and locations ===
Airdrieonians	Ayr United	Dunfermline Athletic	Falkirk
Excelsior Stadium	Somerset Park	East End Park	Falkirk Stadium
Capacity: 10,101	Capacity: 10,185	Capacity: 11,480	Capacity: 7,937
Greenock Morton	Location of teams in 2024–25 Scottish Championship		Hamilton Academical
Cappielow	Location of teams in 2024–25 Scottish Championship		New Douglas Park
Capacity: 11,589	Location of teams in 2024–25 Scottish Championship		Capacity: 6,018
Livingston	Partick Thistle	Queen's Park	Raith Rovers
Almondvale Stadium	Firhill Stadium	Hampden Park	Stark's Park
Capacity: 9,713	Capacity: 10,887	Capacity: 51,866	Capacity: 8,867

Championship football clubs in Falkirk
Championship football clubs in Glasgow
Championship football clubs in Lanarkshire

=== Personnel and kits ===
Team	Manager	Captain	Kit manufacturer	Shirt sponsor
Airdrieonians	(Scotland) Rhys McCabe	(Scotland) Adam Frizzell	Joma	Holemasters
Ayr United	(Scotland) Scott Brown	(England) Ben Dempsey	O'Neills	Jewson (Home); MKM Building Supplies (Away)
Dunfermline Athletic	(Northern Ireland) Neil Lennon	(Scotland) Kyle Benedictus	Erreà	SRJ Windows
Falkirk	(Scotland) John McGlynn	(Scotland) Coll Donaldson	O'Neills	Crunchy Carrots
Greenock Morton	(Scotland) Dougie Imrie	(Scotland) Grant Gillespie	Joma	Dalrada Technology
Hamilton Academical	(Scotland) John Rankin	(Republic of Ireland) Sean McGinty	Kurt	None
Livingston	(Scotland) David Martindale	(Scotland) Jamie Brandon	Joma	Livi Self Storage
Partick Thistle	(Scotland) Brian Graham (interim)	(Scotland) Brian Graham	O'Neills	Clydebuilt Home Improvements
Queen's Park	(Scotland) Steven MacLean (interim)	(England) Calum Ferrie	Adidas	City Facilities Management
Raith Rovers	(Scotland) Barry Robson	(Scotland) Scott Brown	Joma	Dean Park Hotel

=== Managerial changes ===
Team	Outgoing manager	Manner of departure	Date of vacancy	Position in table	Incoming manager	Date of appointment
Raith Rovers	(Scotland) Ian Murray	Sacked	4 August 2024	8th	(Scotland) Neill Collins	3 September 2024
Raith Rovers	(Scotland) Neill Collins	Signed by Sacramento Republic FC	21 December 2024	6th	(Scotland) Barry Robson	29 December 2024
Dunfermline Athletic	(Northern Ireland) James McPake	Sacked	23 December 2024	9th	(Scotland) Michael Tidser	17 January 2025
Partick Thistle	(Scotland) Kris Doolan	Sacked	18 February 2025	4th	(Scotland) Brian Graham (interim)	18 February 2025
Queen's Park	(Scotland) Callum Davidson	Sacked	15 March 2025	7th	(Scotland) Steven MacLean (interim)	16 March 2025
Dunfermline Athletic	(Scotland) Michael Tidser	Sacked	17 March 2025	9th	(Northern Ireland) Neil Lennon	21 March 2025

== League table ==
Pos	Team	Pld	W	D	L	GF	GA	GD	Pts	Promotion, qualification or relegation
1	Falkirk (C, P)	36	22	7	7	72	33	+39	73	Promotion to the Premiership
2	Livingston (O, P)	36	20	10	6	55	27	+28	70	Qualification for the Premiership play-off semi-final
3	Ayr United	36	18	9	9	57	39	+18	63	Qualification for the Premiership play-off quarter-final
4	Partick Thistle	36	15	10	11	43	38	+5	55	Qualification for the Premiership play-off quarter-final
5	Raith Rovers	36	15	8	13	47	43	+4	53	
6	Greenock Morton	36	12	12	12	42	48	−6	48	
7	Dunfermline Athletic	36	9	8	19	28	43	−15	35	
8	Queen's Park	36	9	8	19	36	55	−19	35	
9	Airdrieonians (O)	36	7	8	21	34	62	−28	29	Qualification for the Championship play-offs
10	Hamilton Academical (R)	36	10	6	20	38	64	−26	21 (Note: Hamilton Academical were deducted 15 points for breaching multiple SPFL Rules.)	Relegation to League One

Rules for classification: 1) Points; 2) Goal difference; 3) Goals scored; 4) Head-to-to head points; 5) Head-to-head goal difference; 6) Play-off (only for deciding promotion, play-off participation and relegation).
(C) Champions; (O) Play-off winners; (P) Promoted; (R) Relegated

== Results ==
Teams played each other four times, twice in the first half of the season (home and away) and twice in the second half of the season (home and away), making a total of 180 games, with each team playing 36.

=== First half of season (Matches 1–18) ===
Home \ Away	AIR	AYR	DNF	FAL	GMO	HAM	LIV	PAR	QPA	RAI
Airdrieonians	—	0–1	1–1	0–2	2–2	0–4	0–3	0–2	0–2	1–0
Ayr United	5–0	—	1–0	5–2	1–0	3–2	1–2	1–1	3–2	2–0
Dunfermline Athletic	1–0	1–1	—	0–2	0–0	3–2	3–0	0–1	1–2	2–0
Falkirk	2–0	2–0	2–1	—	6–0	1–0	0–0	2–1	2–1	3–0
Greenock Morton	2–0	1–1	2–0	2–3	—	0–0	0–0	2–1	0–1	2–0
Hamilton Academical	2–2	0–2	1–0	1–3	3–0	—	1–3	1–0	2–1	0–3
Livingston	2–1	0–1	2–0	1–0	1–1	3–0	—	2–0	1–1	2–1
Partick Thistle	2–1	1–0	1–0	1–1	0–0	5–1	0–0	—	3–0	1–1
Queen's Park	2–0	1–1	2–1	0–1	1–0	1–0	1–1	0–1	—	1–2
Raith Rovers	1–0	2–0	2–0	1–0	2–3	3–3	0–1	1–0	1–1	—

Legend: Blue = home team win; Yellow = draw; Red = away team win.

=== Second half of season (Matches 19–36) ===
Home \ Away	AIR	AYR	DNF	FAL	GMO	HAM	LIV	PAR	QPA	RAI
Airdrieonians	—	0–1	3–0	0–3	0–1	2–1	3–3	2–1	2–1	1–0
Ayr United	4–1	—	3–0	1–1	0–0	1–1	1–2	2–1	2–2	3–0
Dunfermline Athletic	0–0	0–2	—	3–3	2–1	0–1	1–0	0–0	0–0	3–1
Falkirk	2–0	2–2	1–0	—	5–0	3–1	1–2	5–2	0–0	1–3
Greenock Morton	2–2	2–1	2–0	0–2	—	2–0	1–2	0–1	2–1	3–3
Hamilton Academical	3–2	0–2	1–0	2–2	0–2	—	0–3	1–2	0–0	0–3
Livingston	2–1	5–0	0–0	1–0	3–2	3–0	—	0–1	3–0	0–0
Partick Thistle	1–1	2–0	1–4	2–1	2–2	1–2	1–1	—	2–1	0–0
Queen's Park	0–5	2–3	0–1	0–4	1–2	1–2	2–0	0–2	—	1–5
Raith Rovers	1–1	1–0	2–0	0–2	1–1	2–0	2–1	3–0	0–4	—

Legend: Blue = home team win; Yellow = draw; Red = away team win.

== Season statistics ==
=== Scoring ===
==== Top scorers ====
Rank	Player	Club	Goals
1	(Scotland) Brian Graham	Partick Thistle	15
2	(England) George Oakley	Ayr United	13
2	(Scotland) Robbie Muirhead	Livingston	13
2	(Scotland) Dylan Easton	Raith Rovers	13
5	(Scotland) Chris Kane	Dunfermline Athletic	11
5	(Scotland) Oli Shaw	Hamilton Academical	11
7	(Scotland) Calvin Miller	Falkirk	10

== Awards ==
Month	Manager of the Month		Player of the Month	
Month	Manager	Club	Player	Club
August	(Scotland) John McGlynn	Falkirk	(Scotland) Anton Dowds	Ayr United
September	(Scotland) Callum Davidson	Queen's Park	(Scotland) Cammy Kerr	Queen's Park
October	(Scotland) John McGlynn	Falkirk	(Scotland) Ethan Ross	Falkirk
November	(Scotland) David Martindale	Livingston	(Scotland) Scott Robinson	Partick Thistle
December	(Scotland) Dougie Imrie	Greenock Morton	(Scotland) Cameron Blues	Greenock Morton
January	(Scotland) Scott Brown	Ayr United	(England) George Oakley	Ayr United
February	(Scotland) David Martindale	Livingston	(Canada) Scott Arfield	Falkirk
March	(Scotland) Brian Graham (Scotland) Mark Wilson	Partick Thistle	(Scotland) Calvin Miller	Falkirk
April	(Scotland) David Martindale	Livingston	(Scotland) Robbie Muirhead	Livingston

== Championship play-offs ==
=== Bracket ===
Semi-finals
1	Airdrieonians	3	2	5
4	Stenhousemuir	1	1	2
3	Queen of the South	0	1	1
2	Cove Rangers	0	2	2

Final
Airdrieonians	2	0	2
Cove Rangers	1	0	1

=== Semi-finals ===
==== First leg ====
6 May 2025	Stenhousemuir	1–3	Airdrieonians	Stenhousemuir
19:45	Aitken 89' (pen.)		McGrattan 21', 29'; Mochrie 51'	Stadium: Ochilview Park; Attendance: 1,458; Referee: Grant Irvine

6 May 2025	Queen of the South	0–0	Cove Rangers	Dumfries
19:45				Stadium: Palmerston Park; Attendance: 1,784; Referee: Ryan Lee

==== Second leg ====
10 May 2025	Airdrieonians	2–1 (5–2 agg.)	Stenhousemuir	Airdrie
15:00	Bannon 38'; B.Wilson 52'		Yates 58'	Stadium: Excelsior Stadium; Attendance: 1,350; Referee: Matthew MacDermid

10 May 2025	Cove Rangers	2–1 (2–1 agg.)	Queen of the South	Aberdeen
15:00	Megginson 8' (pen.); Yule 47'		Kennedy 77'	Stadium: Balmoral Stadium; Attendance: 1,065; Referee: Calum Scott

=== Final ===
==== First leg ====
14 May 2025	Cove Rangers	1–2	Airdrieonians	Aberdeen
20:10	McGrattan 35' (o.g.)		MacDonald 16'; Strapp 63'	Stadium: Balmoral Stadium; Attendance: 811; Referee: Lloyd Wilson

==== Second leg ====
17 May 2025	Airdrieonians	0–0 (2–1 agg.)	Cove Rangers	Airdrie
17:30				Stadium: Excelsior Stadium; Attendance: 1,904; Referee: Ross Hardie
