= 2023–24 Scottish League One =

Scottish League One
- Season: 2023–24
- Dates: 5 August 2023 – 4 May 2024
- Champions: Falkirk
- Promoted: Falkirk; Hamilton Academical (via play-offs)
- Relegated: Stirling Albion (via play-offs); Edinburgh City
- Matches: 180
- Goals: 572 (3.18 per match)
- Top goalscorer: Callumn Morrison; 23 goals
- Biggest home win: Hamilton Academical 5–0 Annan Athletic (29 September 2023); Hamilton Academical 5–0 Stirling Albion (11 November 2023); Hamilton Academical 5–0 Queen of the South (2 December 2023); Cove Rangers 7–2 Edinburgh City (23 December 2023); Falkirk 5–0 Stirling Albion (30 December 2023); Stirling Albion 5–0 Kelty Hearts (27 January 2024)
- Biggest away win: Montrose 1–7 Falkirk (30 March 2024)
- Highest scoring: Cove Rangers 7–2 Edinburgh City (23 December 2023)
- Longest winning run: Cove Rangers; Falkirk; 7 games
- Longest unbeaten run: Falkirk; 36 games
- Longest winless run: Edinburgh City; 17 games
- Longest losing run: Edinburgh City; 7 games
- Highest attendance: 7,272; Falkirk 2–2 Alloa Athletic (4 May 2024)
- Lowest attendance: 226; Edinburgh City 1–4 Kelty Hearts (7 October 2023)
- Total attendance: 214,508
- Average attendance: 1,191
- All statistics correct as of 4 May 2024.

The 2023–24 Scottish League One (known as cinch League One for sponsorship reasons) was the eleventh season of Scottish League One, the third tier of Scottish football. The season began on 5 August 2023.

Ten teams contested the league: Alloa Athletic, Annan Athletic, Cove Rangers, Edinburgh City, Falkirk, Hamilton Academical, Kelty Hearts, Montrose, Queen of the South and Stirling Albion.

== Teams ==
The following teams changed division after the 2022–23 season.

=== To League One ===
Promoted from League Two

- Annan Athletic
- Stirling Albion

Relegated from the Championship

- Cove Rangers
- Hamilton Academical

=== From League One ===
Relegated to League Two

- Clyde
- Peterhead

Promoted to the Championship

- Airdrieonians
- Dunfermline Athletic

=== Stadia and locations ===
Alloa Athletic	Annan Athletic	Cove Rangers	Edinburgh City
Recreation Park	Galabank	Balmoral Stadium	Meadowbank Stadium
Capacity: 3,100	Capacity: 2,504	Capacity: 3,023	Capacity: 1,280
Falkirk	Location of teams in 2023–24 Scottish League One Location of teams in 2023–24 Scottish League One		Hamilton Academical
Falkirk Stadium	Location of teams in 2023–24 Scottish League One Location of teams in 2023–24 Scottish League One		New Douglas Park
Capacity: 7,937	Location of teams in 2023–24 Scottish League One Location of teams in 2023–24 Scottish League One		Capacity: 6,018
Kelty Hearts	Montrose	Queen of the South	Stirling Albion
New Central Park	Links Park	Palmerston Park	Forthbank Stadium
Capacity: 2,181	Capacity: 4,936	Capacity: 8,690	Capacity: 3,808

=== Personnel and kits ===
Team	Manager	Captain	Kit manufacturer	Shirt sponsor
Alloa Athletic	(Scotland) Andy Graham	(Scotland) Scott Taggart	Pendle	Northern Gas and Power
Annan Athletic	(Republic of Ireland) Peter Murphy	(England) Steven Swinglehurst	EV2 Sportswear	M & S Engineering
Cove Rangers	(Scotland) Paul Hartley	(Scotland) Mitch Megginson	Adidas	ACE Group
Edinburgh City	(Scotland) Michael McIndoe	(France) Alieu Faye	Hummel	AMG Construction Group
Falkirk	(Scotland) John McGlynn	(Scotland) Stephen McGinn	O'Neills	Crunchy Carrots
Hamilton Academical	(Scotland) John Rankin	(Scotland) Scott Martin	LF Sports	Active Access
Kelty Hearts	(Scotland) Michael Tidser	(Scotland) Reece Lyon	Umbro	I-Scaff Access Solutions
Montrose	(Scotland) Stewart Petrie	(Scotland) Paul Watson	Uhlsport	Montrose Port Authority (Home); InterMoor (Away)
Queen of the South	(England) Marvin Bartley	(England) Josh Todd	Macron	Blinds by Mark McGowan
Stirling Albion	(Scotland) Darren Young	(Scotland) Ross McGeachie	Joma	Prudential

=== Managerial changes ===
Team	Outgoing manager	Manner of departure	Date of vacancy	Position in table	Incoming manager	Date of appointment
Kelty Hearts	(Scotland) John Potter	Appointed Raith Rovers technical director	12 May 2023	Pre-season	(Scotland) Michael Tidser	17 May 2023
Edinburgh City	(Republic of Ireland) Alan Maybury	Mutual consent	3 October 2023	10th	(Scotland) Michael McIndoe	9 October 2023
Alloa Athletic	(Scotland) Brian Rice	Appointed Livingston coach	9 November 2023	6th	(Scotland) Andy Graham	15 November 2023

== League table ==
Pos	Team	Pld	W	D	L	GF	GA	GD	Pts	Promotion, qualification or relegation
1	Falkirk (C, P)	36	27	9	0	96	28	+68	90	Promotion to the Championship
2	Hamilton Academical (O, P)	36	22	8	6	73	28	+45	74	Qualification for the Championship play-offs
3	Alloa Athletic	36	16	8	12	60	55	+5	56	Qualification for the Championship play-offs
4	Montrose	36	15	8	13	58	57	+1	53	Qualification for the Championship play-offs
5	Cove Rangers	36	14	7	15	58	63	−5	49	
6	Kelty Hearts	36	12	8	16	48	63	−15	44	
7	Queen of the South	36	11	8	17	46	53	−7	41	
8	Annan Athletic	36	9	12	15	55	68	−13	39	
9	Stirling Albion (R)	36	10	9	17	39	58	−19	39	Qualification for the League One play-offs
10	Edinburgh City (R)	36	3	5	28	38	98	−60	8 (Note: On 25 January 2024, Edinburgh City were deducted 6 points, having failed to pay its players’ wages on time and defaulting its tax obligations to HMRC, as well as not engaging fully in the disciplinary process leading to further breaches of SPFL Rules.)	Relegation to League Two

Rules for classification: 1) Points; 2) Goal difference; 3) Goals scored; 4) Head-to-to head points; 5) Head-to-head goal difference; 6) Play-off (only for deciding promotion, play-off participation and relegation).
(C) Champions; (O) Play-off winners; (P) Promoted; (R) Relegated

== Results ==
Teams play each other four times, twice in the first half of the season (home and away) and twice in the second half of the season (home and away), making a total of 180 games, with each team playing 36.

=== First half of season (Matches 1–18) ===
Home \ Away	ALO	ANN	COV	EDI	FAL	HAM	KEL	MON	QOS	STI
Alloa Athletic	—	2–1	1–0	1–1	1–4	0–0	3–1	2–2	1–0	0–1
Annan Athletic	1–1	—	1–3	3–2	0–3	1–2	2–2	1–3	0–1	3–0
Cove Rangers	1–2	3–2	—	7–2	2–2	1–0	2–2	1–0	1–2	3–1
Edinburgh City	3–0	3–2	2–2	—	0–2	0–3	1–4	1–5	1–2	1–3
Falkirk	3–0	3–0	4–0	2–1	—	0–0	2–1	3–2	1–0	3–0
Hamilton Academical	2–1	5–0	1–0	1–1	1–3	—	1–1	1–0	5–0	5–0
Kelty Hearts	2–1	1–1	0–1	3–2	1–5	0–2	—	0–1	3–1	1–0
Montrose	2–1	1–1	0–3	5–2	0–0	0–3	0–2	—	1–4	1–0
Queen of the South	3–4	3–1	0–1	3–1	1–1	1–2	1–3	2–3	—	0–1
Stirling Albion	0–2	1–1	2–2	1–0	1–2	2–2	1–0	0–2	1–1	—

Legend: Blue = home team win; Yellow = draw; Red = away team win.
For upcoming matches, an "a" indicates there is an article about the rivalry between the two participants.

=== Second half of season (Matches 19–36) ===
Home \ Away	ALO	ANN	COV	EDI	FAL	HAM	KEL	MON	QOS	STI
Alloa Athletic	—	1–1	4–1	3–1	0–5	0–1	3–0	0–0	0–2	1–0
Annan Athletic	2–3	—	4–2	3–0	3–3	1–3	3–2	2–2	2–1	2–1
Cove Rangers	2–3	2–1	—	3–1	0–1	1–3	2–2	1–4	0–2	4–2
Edinburgh City	2–5	1–2	0–2	—	2–2	2–5	0–3	1–0	1–1	1–3
Falkirk	2–2	1–1	5–1	4–1	—	3–2	2–2	3–0	1–0	5–0
Hamilton Academical	1–2	2–3	2–0	1–0	0–2	—	4–1	1–1	0–0	3–0
Kelty Hearts	2–1	1–1	0–1	3–1	0–1	0–5	—	0–2	0–0	1–0
Montrose	4–3	1–1	1–1	3–0	1–7	1–2	4–2	—	3–2	0–1
Queen of the South	1–1	2–1	2–0	2–0	1–4	0–2	1–2	2–3	—	2–2
Stirling Albion	1–5	1–1	2–2	4–0	1–2	0–0	5–0	1–0	0–0	—

Legend: Blue = home team win; Yellow = draw; Red = away team win.
For upcoming matches, an "a" indicates there is an article about the rivalry between the two participants.

== Season statistics ==
=== Scoring ===
==== Top scorers ====
Rank	Player	Club	Goals
1	(Scotland) Callumn Morrison	Falkirk	23
2	(England) Rumarn Burrell	Cove Rangers	21
3	(Scotland) Ross MacIver	Falkirk	14
3	(Scotland) Kevin O'Hara	Hamilton Academical	14
5	(Scotland) Bobby Wales	Alloa Athletic	12
5	(Scotland) Aidan Nesbitt	Falkirk	12

== Awards ==
Month	Manager of the Month		Player of the Month	
Month	Manager	Club	Player	Club
August	(Scotland) John Rankin	Hamilton Academical	(Scotland) Jamie Smith	Hamilton Academical
September	(Scotland) John McGlynn	Falkirk	(Scotland) Callumn Morrison	Falkirk
October	(Scotland) John McGlynn	Falkirk	(Scotland) Kyle MacDonald	Hamilton Academical
November	(Scotland) Paul Hartley	Cove Rangers	(England) Rumarn Burrell	Cove Rangers
December	(Scotland) John McGlynn	Falkirk	(England) Rumarn Burrell	Cove Rangers
January	(Scotland) John McGlynn	Falkirk	(Scotland) Calvin Miller	Falkirk
February	(Scotland) Andy Graham	Alloa Athletic	(Scotland) Taylor Steven	Alloa Athletic
March	(Scotland) John McGlynn	Falkirk	(Scotland) Callumn Morrison	Falkirk
April	(Scotland) John McGlynn	Falkirk	(Scotland) Aidan Smith	Annan Athletic

The SPFL League One manager of the year was John McGlynn of Falkirk.

The SPFL League One player of the year was Callumn Morrison of Falkirk.

== League One play-offs ==
=== Bracket ===
Semi-finals
1	Stirling Albion	1	0	1
4	Dumbarton	2	0	2
3	The Spartans	2	5	7
2	Peterhead	1	1	2

Final
Dumbarton	2	2	4
The Spartans	1	2	3

=== Semi-finals ===
==== First leg ====
7 May 2024	Dumbarton	2–1	Stirling Albion	Dumbarton
19:45	Hilton 12'; T.Wallace 84' (pen.)		Hilson 27'	Stadium: Dumbarton Football Stadium; Attendance: 900; Referee: Ross Hardie

7 May 2024	The Spartans	2–1	Peterhead	Edinburgh
19:45	Watson 17'; Henderson 90' (pen.)		O'Keefe 8'	Stadium: Ainslie Park; Attendance: 843; Referee: Dan McFarlane

==== Second leg ====
11 May 2024	Peterhead	1–5 (2–7 agg.)	The Spartans	Peterhead
15:00	D. Strachan 66'		Russell 3'; Henderson 30', 67' (pen.), 78'; Whyte 62'	Stadium: Balmoor Stadium; Attendance: 947; Referee: Iain Snedden

11 May 2024	Stirling Albion	0–0 (1–2 agg.)	Dumbarton	Stirling
15:00				Stadium: Forthbank Stadium; Attendance: 1,087; Referee: Lloyd Wilson

=== Final ===
==== First leg ====
14 May 2024	Dumbarton	2–1	The Spartans	Dumbarton
19:30	Wallace 21'; Gray 29'		Sonkur 48'	Stadium: Dumbarton Football Stadium; Attendance: 850; Referee: Steven Kirkland

==== Second leg ====
17 May 2024	The Spartans	2–2 (3–4 agg.)	Dumbarton	Edinburgh
19:30	Russell 3'; Henderson 90+4' (pen.)		Ruth 5', 53'	Stadium: Ainslie Park; Attendance: 2,281; Referee: Grant Irvine
