= Murray (surname) =

Murray ([ˈmʌrɪ]) (Irish: Ó Muirí) is both a Scottish and an Irish surname with two distinct respective etymologies. The Scottish version is a common variation of the word Moray, an anglicisation of the Medieval Gaelic word Muireb (or Moreb); the b here was pronounced as v, hence the Latinization to Moravia. These names denote the district on the south shore of the Moray Firth, in Scotland. Murray is a direct transliteration of how Scottish people pronounce the word Moray. The Murray spelling is not used for the geographical area, which is Moray, but it became the commonest form of the surname, especially among Scottish emigrants, to the extent that the surname Murray is now much more common than the original surname Moray. See also Clan Murray.

In addition to the Scottish derivation, the Irish version may derive from Ó Muireadhaigh, Mac Muireadhaigh, and Mac Giolla Mhuire.

== History ==
A considerable number of present bearers of this surname are of Scottish origin, especially in Ulster. Possible etymologies are:

- From Moray in northeast Scotland, which came from the Scottish Gaelic for "sea settlement".
- As a native Irish of this name, from Mac Muireadhaigh or Ó Muireadhaigh "descendant of Muireadhach" or Mac Giolla Mhuire "descendant of the servant of the Virgin Mary".

The motto for Murray is Imperio. "Murrays" trace their heritage back to the 12th century and take their name from the province of Moray, once a local kingdom. It was during this time that the Flemish lords crossed the North Sea and established themselves in the Scottish realm. Among them was Freskin. It is possible that either Freskin or his son William intermarried with the ancient royal house of Moray. The senior line of the Murrays took the surname of Sutherland and became Earls of Sutherland by 1235.

Thereafter, the chiefs of the Murrays were the Lords of Petty in Moray, who also became Lords of Bothwell in Clydesdale before 1253. An heir of this line, Sir Andrew Moray, was the brilliant young general who led the Scots in 1297 in their first uprising against English rule. He was mortally wounded while winning his famous victory at the Battle of Stirling Bridge.

His son, Sir Andrew Murray, 4th Lord of Bothwell, third Regent of Scotland, married Christian Bruce, a sister of King Robert the Bruce. He was captured at Roxburgh early in 1333 and was a prisoner in England at the time of the Battle of Halidon Hill. He obtained his freedom in time to march to the relief of his wife, who was defending Kildrummy Castle. Sir Andrew commenced with unabated spirit to struggle in the cause of independence and died in 1338.

The last Murray Lord of Bothwell died in 1360 of the plague. By the 16th century, the Murrays of Tullibardine in Strathearn had assumed the leadership of the Murrays. This was formally confirmed by Bands of Association in 1586 and 1589.

Sir John became the 1st Earl of Tullibardine in 1606. Thus, the Tullibardine hegemony was firmly established among the Murrays; and George Iain Murray, 10th Duke of Atholl was also Marquis of Tullibardine as recognized in Lyon Register as Chief of the Murrays. The 2nd Earl of Tullibardine William Murray, 1574 circa – 1628, married Lady Dorothea Stewart, heiress of the Earls of Atholl in 1629 and Marquises from 1676. To their medieval peacock's head crest (motto-Praite), they added the mermaid (motto-Tout Pret), as Lords of Balquidder; and in the seventeenth century, they took the demi-savage holding a sword and a key commemorating the capture of the last Lord of the Isles by the 1st Stewart Earl of Atholl in 1475: hence the motto Furth, Fortune, and Fill the Fetters. (Go forth against your enemies, have good fortune, and return with hostages and booty).

Since 1703, the Murray's chiefs have been Dukes of Atholl. For a time in the 18th century, the Murray dukes were also Sovereign Lords of the Isle of Man, with their own coinage and parliament, The House of Keys. The 1st Duke's younger son, Lord George Murray, was the Jacobite general responsible for the highlander's successes through the early part of the 1745 uprising.

Much of the above information about the Murrays was taken from the book The Highland Clans, by Iain Moncreiffe of that Ilk.

Lord George's descendant George Murray, 10th Duke of Atholl, died in February 1996. The new Duke of Atholl is John Murray, 11th Duke of Atholl, a South African. The new Duke has taken the chiefship of the Murrays.

== People ==
Murray may refer to many people (see also Clan Murray):

== A ==
- Aaron Murray (born 1990), American football player
- Adam Murray (born 1981), English footballer
- Adam Murray (died 1706), Irish Ulster Scots soldier known for the 1689 defence of Derry
- Al Murray (born 1968), comedian
- Albert Murray, including:
  - Albert Murray (writer) (1916–2013), African-American literary and jazz critic, novelist and biographer
  - Albert Murray, Baron Murray of Gravesend (1930–1980), British Labour Party politician, Member of Parliament 1964–1970
  - Bert Murray (born 1942), English football player
- Alexander Murray (1755–1821), U.S. Navy officer, Revolutionary War
- Alexander Murray (1816–1884), U.S. Navy officer, Mexican-American and American Civil Wars
- Alexander Murray (geologist) (1810–1884), Scottish geologist
- Alexander Murray (linguist) (1775–1813), linguist and professor at Edinburgh University
- Alexander Murray, 1st Baron Murray of Elibank (1870–1920)
- Alexander Murray, 6th Earl of Dunmore (1804–1845)
- Alexander Murray, 8th Earl of Dunmore (1871–1962)
- Alexander Borthwick Murray (1816–1903), South Australian colonist, pastoralist and parliamentarian
- Alexander Howison Murray Jr. (1907–1993), mayor of Placerville, California
- Alexander Hunter Murray (1818 or 1819–1874), a Hudson's Bay Company fur trader and artist
- Alexander Stuart Murray (1841–1904), archaeologist
- Aline Murray Kilmer (1888–1941), American poet
- Alison Murray, including
  - Alison Murray (author), Scottish children's author
  - Alison Murray (director), Canadian film and video director
  - Alison Murray (scientist), American ecologist
- Allan Murray (disambiguation)
- Alma Murray, (1854–1945), English actress
- Andrew Murray, including:
  - Sir Andrew Murray, Guardian of Scotland in 1332 and again from 1335 to 1338
  - Andrew Murray (naturalist) (1812–1878), Scottish lawyer and scientist
  - Andrew Murray (Guyanese boxer) (1971–2002), Guyanese boxer of the 1990s and 2000s
  - Andrew Murray (trade unionist) (born 1958), Chair of the Stop the War Coalition and former member of the Communist Party of Britain
  - Andrew Murray (children's writer) (born 1970), English children's writer
  - Andrew Murray (golfer) (born 1956), English golfer
  - Andrew Murray (minister) (1828–1917), South African minister of religion, missionary, and author
  - Andrew Murray (Australian politician) (born 1947), Australian politician, member of the Australian Senate
  - Andrew Murray, 1st Viscount Dunedin (1849–1942)
- Andy Murray (ice hockey) (born 1951), Canadian ice hockey player, coach
- Sir Andy Murray (born 1987), Scottish tennis player
- Ann Murray (born 1949), Irish mezzo-soprano
- Anna Evans Murray (1857–1955), American advocate for early childhood education
- Anne Murray (born 1945), Canadian singer
- Anne Murray, Duchess of Atholl (1814–1897)
- Anton Murray (1922–1995), South African cricketer
- Antonio Murray (born 1984), English football player
- Antonio Murray (police officer) (born 1971), former Baltimore Police officer sentenced to 139 years in prison
- Archibald Murray
  - Sir Archibald Murray, 3rd Baronet (d. before 1777), Scottish soldier
  - Archibald Wright Murray (1811–1892) (Rev. A. W. Murray), missionary, see Coming of the Light
  - Archibald Murray (1860–1945), British general
  - Archibald R. Murray (1933–2001), African American lawyer
- Arnold Murray, including:
  - Arnold Murray (pastor) (1929–2014), founder and pastor, The Shepherd's Chapel
  - Arnold Murray (1854–1952), one of the Last surviving Confederate veterans
  - Arnold Murray (1933–1989), lover of Alan Turing, prosecuted for homosexual activity
- Arthur Murray (1895–1991), American dance instructor and businessman, married to Kathryn Murray
- Arthur Murray, 3rd Viscount Elibank (1879–1962)
- Athol Murray (1892–1975), Canadian priest and high school president
- Lady Augusta Murray (1761–1830)

== B ==
- Barbara Murray (1929–2014), actress
- Bert Murray (born 1942), English football player
- Bill Murray (born 1950), American actor
- Billy Murray (actor) (born 1941), British actor
- Billy Murray (singer) (1877–1954), American singer
- Bob Murray (businessman) (born 1946), businessman and former chairman of Sunderland Football Club
- Bobby Murray (musician) (1953–2026), American electric blues guitarist, songwriter and record producer
- Brady Murray (born 1984), American ice hockey player
- Braham Murray (1943–2018), English theatre director
- Brendan Murray (born 1996), Irish singer
- Brendan Murray (born 1995), known as Bighead (producer), American record producer
- Brett Murray (born 1961), South African artist
- Brian Doyle-Murray (born 1945), American comedian, screenwriter and actor
- Bruce C. Murray (1931–2013), American planetary scientist
- Bruce Murray (cricketer) (1940–2023), New Zealand cricketer
- Bruce Murray (soccer) (born 1966), American soccer player
- Bryan Murray (ice hockey) (1942–2017), Canadian ice hockey coach and executive

== C ==
- Calesha "Bre-Z" Murray (born 1987), American actress and rapper
- Cammy Murray (1944–2025), Scottish footballer
- Casford Murray (ca. 1920–2014), Antiguan politician
- Chad Michael Murray (born 1981), American actor, former male fashion model and teen idol
- Charles Murray (disambiguation), multiple people
- Charles R. Murray (1882–1938), Canadian professional golfer
- Charlotte Murray (1754–1808), English botanist and author better known as Lady Charlotte Murray
- Charlotte Murray, Duchess of Atholl (1731–1805)
- Cheryl Murray (born 1952), British actress
- Chris Murray (born 1966), Canadian singer-songwriter and guitarist
- Christian Murray, Canadian comedy writer
- Christy Murray, musician
- Cianna Murray, Canadian ice hockey referee
- Clark Murray (born 1938), American sculptor
- Colin Murray (born 1977), presenter
- Conor Murray (born 1989), Irish rugby union player
- Conrad Murray (born 1953), personal physician of Michael Jackson
- Craig Murray (born 1958), former British Ambassador to Uzbekistan
- Cristiane Murray (born 1962), Brazilian journalist and Vice Director of the Holy See Press Office

== D ==
- Dana Murray (Missouri politician) (born 1946), American politician from Missouri
- Daniel Murray (disambiguation), multiple people
- Darren Murray (born 1974), Scottish footballer
- Darrin Murray (born 1967), New Zealand cricketer
- Dave Murray (musician) (born 1956), Iron Maiden guitarist
- David Murray (disambiguation), multiple people
- David Christie Murray (1847–1907), English journalist and writer
- David Murray-Lyon (1890–1975), officer in the Indian Army
- Dee Murray (1946–1992), British bassist, best known as a member of Elton John's original rock band
- Dejounte Murray (born 1996), American basketball player
- Denis Murray (journalist) (born 1951), British television journalist
- DeMarco Murray (born 1988), Dallas Cowboys running back
- Denis Murray (athlete) (1881–1944), Irish athlete at the 1908 Olympic Games in London
- Desirée Murray, Trinidad and Tobago politician
- Deryck Murray (born 1943), West Indies cricketer
- Devon Murray (born 1988), Irish actor
- Don Murray (clarinetist) (1904–1929), American jazz musician
- Don Murray (actor) (1929–2024), American actor
- Don Murray (writer) (1923–2006), Pulitzer Prize–winning writer for the Boston Herald
- Donald Walter Gordon Murray (1894–1976), Canadian surgeon
- Douglas Murray (ice hockey) (born 1980), Swedish ice hockey player
- Durno Murray (1925–2009), Australian ornithologist

== E ==
- Earl Murray (1926–1994), American football player
- Ed Murray (Washington politician) (born 1955), politician from Washington State
- Eddie Murray (born 1956), American baseball player
- Eddie Murray (American football) (born 1956)
- Edmund P. Murray (1930–2007), American novelist and journalist
- Edmundo Murray (born 1955), Argentine author
- Edwin R. Murray (born 1960), American politician
- Eileen Murray (born 1958), American hedge fund executive
- Elaine Murray (born 1954), Scottish politician
- Eli Houston Murray (1843–1896), Governor of Utah Territory (1880–1886)
- Elisabeth Murray (1909–1998), English biographer and educationist
- Eoin Murray (born 1982), Irish auto racing driver
- Eric Murray (bridge) (1928–2018), Canadian bridge player
- Eric Murray (cricketer) (1893–1971), South African cricketer
- Eric Murray (footballer) (1941–2016)
- Eric Murray (rower) (born 1982), New Zealand rower
- Eunice Murray (1878–1960), Scottish suffrage campaigner, author, folklorist. First Scottish woman to stand in the first election open to women in 1918.
- Eunice Murray Blackmer (1902–1994), American housekeeper, nurse and writer
- Eustace Clare Grenville Murray (1824–1881), English journalist

== F ==
- Figen Murray (fl. 2024), British campaigner for Martyn's Law
- Francis Murray (1838–1872), mayor of Brisbane
- Francis Edwin Murray (1854–1932), poet
- Francis Joseph Murray (1911–1996), American mathematician known for his foundational work on functional analysis
- Frank Murray (1885–1951), coach of the Virginia Cavaliers
- Franny Murray (1915–1998), American football player
- Fraser Murray (born 1999), Scottish footballer
- Freddy Murray (born 2003), Irish tennis player
- Frieda A. Murray (born 1948), fantasy writer

== G ==
- Garth Murray (born 1982), Canadian ice hockey player
- Geoffrey Cushing-Murray (born 1946), American songwriter
- George Murray (disambiguation), multiple people
- Gideon Oliphant-Murray, 2nd Viscount Elibank (1877–1951)
- Gilbert Murray (1866–1957), British intellectual
- Gilbert Elliot-Murray-Kynynmound, 1st Earl of Minto (1751–1814)
- Glen Murray (ice hockey) (born 1972), Canadian ice hockey player
- Glen Murray (politician) (born 1957), Canadian politician
- Glenn Murray (born 1983), English football player
- Gerald R. Murray (born 1956), 14th Chief Master Sergeant of the US Air Force
- Gordon Murray (born 1946), designer of Formula One race cars
- Gordon Murray (puppeteer) (1921–2016), British television producer and puppeteer
- K. Gordon Murray (1922–1979), American film producer
- Grace H. Murray (1872–1944), American artist
- Grace Hopper (1906–1992), Grace Murray Hopper, American computer scientist and United States Navy rear admiral
- Graham Murray (1955–2013), Australian rugby league player and coach
- Grant Murray (born 1975), Scottish professional footballer
- Grover E. Murray (1916–2003), President of Texas Tech University (1966–1976)
- Guillermo Murray (1927–2021), Argentine actor and director
- Guy Murray, American track/cross country coach and former marathon runner

== H ==
- Hannah Murray (born 1989), English actress
- H. J. R. Murray (1868–1955), English chess historian
- Harry Murray (1880–1966), Australian Victoria Cross recipient
- Henry Murray (disambiguation), various people, including
  - Henry Murray (1893–1988), American psychologist who developed the Thematic Apperception Test (TAT)
- Herbert Harley Murray (1829–1904), English colonial governor
- Herbert Murray (footballer) (1886–1918), Scottish footballer
- Hubert Murray (1861–1940), brother of Gilbert Murray
- Hugh Murray (disambiguation), multiple people

== I ==
- Iain Murray (disambiguation), multiple people
- Iain Murray (sailor) (born 1958), Australian Olympic sailor
- Ian Murray (disambiguation), multiple people

== J ==
- J. A. Murray (naturalist)
- Jack Murray (disambiguation), multiple people
- Jaime Murray (born 1976), English actress
- Jamal Murray (born 1997), Canadian basketball player
- James Murray (disambiguation), multiple people
- Jamie Murray (born 1986), Scottish tennis player
- Jan Murray (1916–2006), American stand-up comedian
- Janet Murray (born 1946), American professor of literature, media, and communication
- Janice Murray (footballer) (born 1966), English association footballer
- Janice Murray (speech therapist), Professor at Manchester Metropolitan University
- Janet Murray, Professor at the Georgia Institute of Technology
- Jayden Murray (born 1997), American baseball player
- Jenni Murray (1950–2026), British journalist and broadcaster
- Jennifer Murray (born 1940), British pilot and the first woman to circumnavigate the world in a helicopter
- Jessica Murrey, game developer and peacemaker
- Jillian Murray (born 1984), American actress
- Jim Murray (football), American football executive
- Jim Murray (musician) (1942–2013), a San Francisco musician of the 1960s
- Jim Murray (sportswriter) (1919–1998), American sportswriter
- Jimmy Murray (offensive lineman) (born 1995), American football player
- Joan Murray (disambiguation), multiple people
  - Joan Murray (born 1945), American poet
- Joel Murray (born 1963), American actor
- Joel Murray (basketball) (born 1999), American basketball player
- Joelle Murray (born 1986), Scottish footballer
- Johan Andreas Murray (1740–1791), Swedish botanist and physician
- John Murray (disambiguation), multiple people
- John Murray, 1st Earl of Atholl (c.1605-1642)
- John Courtney Murray (1904–1967), American priest and theologian
- John Stewart-Murray, 7th Duke of Atholl (1840–1917)
- John Stewart-Murray, 8th Duke of Atholl (1871–1942)
- Johnston Murray (1902–1974), Governor of Oklahoma
- Jon Murray (disambiguation), multiple people
- Jonathan Murray (born 1955), television producer
- Jordan Murray (disambiguation), multiple people
- Joseph Murray (disambiguation), multiple people
- Judith Sargent Murray (1751–1820)
- Judy Murray (born 1959), Scottish tennis coach
- Juggy Murray (1923–2005), American record label owner
- Junior Murray (born 1968), West Indian cricketer

== K ==
- Kate Murray (disambiguation), multiple people
- Katharine Stewart-Murray, Duchess of Atholl (1874–1960), Duchess of Atholl
- Keegan Murray (born 2000), American basketball player
- Keith Murray (disambiguation), multiple people
- Ken Murray (disambiguation), multiple people
- Kenneth Murray (disambiguation), multiple people
- Kevin Murray (disambiguation), multiple people
- Kyler Murray (born 1997), American football and baseball player

== L ==
- Lamond Murray (born 1973), basketball player
- Larry Murray (disambiguation), multiple people
- Lawrence J. Murray, Jr. (1910–2000), New York politician
- Lawrence O. Murray, U.S. Comptroller of the Currency from 1908 to 1913
- Lee Murray (born 1977), a British mixed martial arts fighter of partial Moroccan descent.
- Len Murray (Lionel Murray, Baron Murray of Epping Forest, 1922–2004), British Trade Union leader
- Lenda Murray (born 1962), American female bodybuilder
- Les Murray (broadcaster) (1945–2017), Hungarian-Australian sports journalist
- Les Murray (poet) (1938–2019), Australian poet
- Leticia Murray (born 1979), Mexican actress
- Lindley Murray (1745–1826), American lawyer
- Lindley Murray (tennis) (1892–1970), American tennis player
- Liz Murray (born 1980), American inspirational speaker
- Louise Murray (1854–1931), American local historian and museum director
- Lowell Murray (born 1936), Canadian politician
- Lynne Murray, British psychopathologist and academic

== M ==
- Madalyn Murray O'Hair (1919–1995), American atheist
- Mae Murray (1885–1965), American actress, dancer, film producer, and screenwriter
- Maggie Murray (born 1942), British photojournalist and documentary photographer
- Magnus Miller Murray (1787–1838), Mayor of Pittsburgh, Pennsylvania
- Margaret Murray (1863–1963), British Egyptologist
- Margaret Murray (baseball) (died 2006), All-American Girls Professional Baseball League player
- Margaret Polson Murray (1865–1927), Canadian social reformer, magazine editor, and founder of the Imperial Order Daughters of the Empire
- Margaret Lally "Ma" Murray (1888–1982) American-Canadian newspaper editor, publisher, and columnist
- Margaret Murray Washington (1865–1925), principal of Tuskegee Normal and Industrial Institute
- Mark Murray (disambiguation), multiple people
- Marty Murray (born 1975), Canadian hockey player
- Matt Murray (disambiguation), multiple people
- Matt Murray (ice hockey, born 1994), Canadian ice hockey goalie x2 Stanley Cup champion for the Ottawa Senators of the NHL
- Matthew Murray (1765–1826), English steam engine and machine tool manufacturer
- Maura Murray (born 1982), American woman who disappeared in 2004
- Melanie Murray (fl. 2017), American author
- Michael Murray (organist) (1943–2024), American musician and writer
- Mike Murray (cricketer) (1930–2024), English banker, cricketer, and administrator
- Mike Murray (ice hockey) (born 1966), Canadian hockey player and coach
- Mitch Murray (born 1940), English songwriter, record producer, and author
- Mitchell Durno Murray (1925–2009), Australian veterinary scientist and ornithologist
- Montolieu Oliphant-Murray, 1st Viscount Elibank (1840–1927), Scottish nobleman

== N ==
- Nathan Lovett-Murray (born 1982), Australian rules footballer
- Nathaniel A. Murray
- Nathaniel O. Murray (1834–1882), American politician
- Neil Murray (Australian musician) (born 1956)
- Neil Murray (British musician) (born 1950)

== P ==
- Pat Murray (disambiguation), multiple people
- Patrick Murray (disambiguation), multiple people
- Patty Murray (Patricia Lynn Murray, born 1950), United States Senator
- Paul Murray (disambiguation), multiple people
- Paula Murray (born 1958), Canadian ceramic artist
- Pauli Murray (1910–1985), American civil rights activist
- Peta Murray (born 1958), Australian writer
- Pete Murray (Australian singer-songwriter) (born 1969), Australian singer-songwriter
- Pete Murray (DJ) (born 1925), English disc jockey
- Peter Murray (Harvard Law School), Harvard Law professor
- Peter Jonathan Murray (born 1965), Australian-American immunologist and biochemist
- Peter Murray-Rust (born 1941), English chemist, open data activist
- Philip Murray (1886–1952), Scottish-born steelworker and American labor leader
- Philip H. Murray (1842–1917), American journalist, phrenologist, and civil rights activist
- Philip I. Murray, English ophthalmologist

== R ==
- Raymond Murray (1913–2004), American Marine Corps officer
- Raymond Murray (speed skater) (1910–1961), American Olympic speed skater
- Red Murray (1884–1958), American baseball player
- Reginald Murray (1918–1942), Australian private who was killed in the Ration truck massacre
- Rem Murray (born 1972), Canadian ice hockey player
- Richard Murray (disambiguation), multiple people
- Rob Murray (born 1967), Canadian ice hockey player
- Robert Murray (disambiguation), multiple people
- Robin Murray (born 1944), British psychiatrist
- Ronald Murray (born 1979), American basketball player
- Ronald King Murray, Lord Murray (1922–2016), Scottish politician and judge
- Roseana Murray (born 1950), Brazilian children's poet
- Roxy Murray, British stylist, podcaster and disability rights advocate
- Ruby Murray (1935–1996), Northern Ireland singer
- Rupert Murray (born 1969), British film director
- Russell Mervyn Murray (1877–1945), mine manager in Mount Lyell, Tasmania
- Ryan Murray (born 1993), Canadian ice hockey player

== S ==
- Sabina Murray (born 1968), Filipina-American screenwriter
- Samantha Murray (born 1989), English modern pentathlete
- Samantha Murray Sharan (born 1987), British tennis player
- Scott Murray (rugby player) (born 1976), Scottish rugby player
- Sean Murray (disambiguation), multiple people
- Shaun Murray (born 1976), US wakeboarder
- Shaun Murray (footballer) (born 1970), English footballer
- Shirley Murray (1931–2020), New Zealand hymn writer
- Simon Murray (disambiguation), multiple people
- Stephen Murray (disambiguation), multiple people, several people, including:
  - Stephen Murray (actor) (1912–1983), British actor
  - Stephen Murray (historian) (born 1945), British architectural historian
  - Stephen O. Murray (1950–2019), sociologist, anthropologist, scholar specialising in homosexuality
- Stuart Murray (born 1954), politician in Manitoba, Canada
- Stuart S. Murray (1898–1980), Vice Admiral of the United States Navy
- Suna Murray (born 1955), US figure skater
- Sunny Murray James Marcellus Arthur Murray (1936–2017), American free jazz drummer
- Sara Murray (born 1968), British entrepreneur and businesswoman

== T ==
- Taine Murray (born 2002), New Zealand basketball player
- Tanner Murray (born 1999), American baseball player
- Tara Murray, American politician
- Tavi Murray, 8th woman to win the Polar Medal
- T. C. Murray (1873–1959), Irish dramatist
- Terence Aubrey Murray (1810–1873), politician in New South Wales
- Terry Murray (born 1950), Canadian ice hockey player
- Therese Murray (born 1947), American politician, President of the Massachusetts Senate
- Thomas Murray (disambiguation), multiple people, including:
  - Thomas Murray (curler) (1877–1944), Scottish curler
- Tim Murray (born 1968), American lawyer
- Tom J. Murray (1894–1971), Democratic U.S. Representative from Tennessee (1943–1966)
- Tracy Murray (born 1971), American basketball player, coach, and color commentator
- Troy Murray (1962–2026), Canadian ice hockey player
- Ty Murray (born 1969), American champion rodeo cowboy, ex-husband of Jewel

== W ==
- Wal Murray (1931–2004), Australian politician
- Walter Charles Murray (1866–1945)
- Will Murray (1953–2026), American novelist
- Willard H. Murray, Jr. (1931–2021), American politician
- W. H. Murray (1913–1996), Scottish mountaineer and writer
- William Murray (disambiguation), multiple people, multiple people
- William H. Murray (Medal of Honor recipient) (1876–1923), American Medal of Honor recipient

== Y ==
- Yvonne Murray (disambiguation), multiple people

== See also ==
- Justice Murray (disambiguation), multiple people
- Clan Murray
- Murry (disambiguation), multiple people, includes list of people with surname Murry
- Moray (name)
- Jonathan Marray, a tennis player
