= Joseph Murray (disambiguation) =

Joseph E. Murray (1919–2012) was an American surgeon and father of transplantation.

Joseph Murray may also refer to:

== Sports ==
- Joseph Murray (1890s footballer), Scottish professional footballer
- Joseph Murray (footballer, born 1908) (1908–1988), English footballer
- Joe Murray (footballer) (1914–1990), Scottish professional footballer
- Joey Murray (footballer) (born 1971), English former footballer
- Joe Murray (baseball) (1920–2001), American baseball player
- Joe Murray (cyclist) (born 1963), American cyclist
- Joe Murray (British boxer) (born 1987), British boxer
- Joseph Murray (Guyanese boxer) (born 1967), Guyanese boxer
- Joe Murray (rugby league) (1887–1944), Australian rugby league player

== Other ==
- Joseph T. Murray (1834–1907), American abolitionist, manufacturer, inventor
- Joseph Philip Robert Murray (born 1943), Canadian Mounted Police commissioners
- Sir Joseph Murray, 3rd Baronet (1718–1802), soldier of Scottish descent
- Joe Murray (animator) (born 1961), American creator of Rocko's Modern Life and Camp Lazlo
- Joe Murray (British Army soldier) (born 1963), British soldier and television personality
- Joey Murray, member of pop band A Touch of Class
- Joseph Murray (politician), 19th century Republican politician who "discovered" future President Theodore Roosevelt in the 1880s

== See also ==
- Murray (surname)
