= Robert Murray =

Robert Murray may refer to:

== Politicians ==
- Robert Murray (died 1672), of Cameron, Scottish politician
- Sir Robert Moray or Robert Murray (1609–1673), Scottish soldier, diplomat, natural philosopher; first President of the Royal Society of London
- Robert Murray (British Army officer, born 1689) (1689–1738), Scottish soldier and Member of Parliament
- Robert Maynard Murray (1841–1913), American politician and businessman
- Robert Murray (New Brunswick politician) (1853–1926)
- Robert Murray (co-operator) (1869–1950), British Labour Member of Parliament for West Renfrewshire, 1922–1924
- Robert J. Murray (born 1934), United States Under Secretary of the Navy
- Robert Murray (Maine politician) (born 1959)
- Robert Murray, American musician and co-founder of Beatles tribute Studio Two

== Sportsmen ==
=== Footballers ===
- Robert Murray (Irish footballer) (died 1906)
- Robert Murray (Scottish footballer) (1915–?), played for Bath City, Heart of Midlothian, and Manchester United
- Bob Murray (Australian footballer) (born 1942), Australian rules footballer for St Kilda and Sandringham
- Rob Murray (footballer) (born 1974), English former footballer for A.F.C. Bournemouth

=== Other sportsmen ===
- Robert Murray (sport shooter) (1870–1948), British Olympic sport shooter
- Robert Lindley Murray (1892–1970), American tennis player
- Bob Murray (ice hockey, born 1948), Canadian ice hockey defenceman for the Atlanta Flames and Vancouver Canucks
- Robert Murray (ice hockey, born 1951), Canadian-born ice hockey defenceman who competed for Germany at the 1978, 1979, and 1981 World Championships
- Bob Murray (ice hockey, born 1954), Canadian ice hockey player for the Chicago Blackhawks and former general manager of the Anaheim Ducks
- Rob Murray (born 1967), Canadian ice hockey player and coach
- Robbie Murray (born 1976), Irish boxer

== Other people ==
- Robert Murray (financier) (1635–1725?), English writer on commerce, and deviser of the first London penny post
- Robert Murray (died 1719), Scottish soldier
- Robert Murray (merchant) (1721–1786), American merchant
- Robert Murray (Royal Navy officer) (c. 1760–1834)
- Robert Murray (British Army officer, born 1689) (1689–1738)
- Robert Murray (physician) (1822–1913), physician and officer in the U.S. Army
- Robert Milne Murray (1855–1904), Scottish surgeon and medical author
- Robert Fuller Murray (1863–1894), Scottish poet
- Robert Murray (educator) (1888–1967), Scottish teacher and painter
- R. G. E. Murray (Robert George Everitt Murray, 1919–2022), English-Canadian bacteriologist
- Robert K. Murray (1922–2019), American professor of history
- Robert Murray (priest), English professor of Syriac and theologian
- Robert Murray (artist) (born 1936), Canadian sculptor, printmaker, painter, and art teacher
- Robert E. Murray (1940–2020), American businessman; former chief executive officer of Murray Energy Corporation
- Bob Murray (businessman) (born 1946), British businessman and former chairman of Sunderland Football Club
- Robert C. Murray (1946–1970), American soldier and Medal of Honor recipient
- Robert P. Murray (1936–2020), American musician and teacher

== See also ==
- Robert Morey (disambiguation)
