= George Murray =

George Murray may refer to:

== Arts ==
- George Murray (musician), bass guitarist
- George Murray (poet) (born 1971), Canadian poet

== Military ==
- George Murray (general) (1694–1760), Jacobite general
- George Murray, 6th Lord Elibank (died 1785), British naval officer
- George Murray (Royal Navy officer, born 1741) (1741–1797), Royal Navy officer and MP for Perth Burghs
- George Murray (Royal Navy officer, born 1759) (1759–1819), Royal Navy admiral
- George Murray (British Army officer) (1772–1846), lieutenant-governor of Upper Canada
- George Poultney Malcolm Murray (1837–1910), officer in the paramilitary Native Police of Queensland
- George D. Murray (1889–1956), American admiral in World War II

== Politics ==
- George Murray, 5th Earl of Dunmore (1762–1836), Scottish politician and peer
- George Crawford Murray (1827–1884), New Jersey state legislator
- George Murray (Nova Scotia politician) (1828–1888), physician and politician in Nova Scotia, Canada
- George W. Murray (1853–1926), US congressman from South Carolina
- George Henry Murray (1861–1929), premier of Nova Scotia
- George Matheson Murray (1889–1961), Canadian editor, journalist and politician
- George Belcher Murray (1895–1941), politician from Nova Scotia, Canada

== Religion ==
- Lord George Murray (bishop) (1761–1803), bishop of St David's, grandson of the general
- George Murray (bishop of Rochester) (1784–1860), bishop of Sodor and Man, 1814–1827, and Rochester, 1827–1860, son of the bishop of St David's
- George M. Murray (bishop) (1919–2006), bishop of the Episcopal Church in the United States

== Sports ==
- George Murray (baseball) (1898–1955), pitcher, nicknamed "Smiler"
- George Murray (cricketer) (born 1940), Australian cricketer
- George Murray (footballer) (born 1942), Scottish footballer
- George Murray (golfer) (born 1983), Scottish professional golfer
- George Murray (rugby union), Scottish rugby player

== Academics ==
- George Murray (naturalist) (1858–1911), Scottish botanist
- Gilbert Murray (George Gilbert Aime Murray, 1866–1957), British classical scholar

== Other people ==
- George Murray, 6th Duke of Atholl (1814–1864), Scottish peer who formed the Atholl Highlanders
- Sir George Murray (civil servant) (1849–1936), British civil servant
- George Redmayne Murray (1865–1939), British physician
- George Murray (engineer) (1859–1947), New Zealand civil engineer and surveyor
- Sir George John Robert Murray (1863–1942), Chief Justice of South Australia
- George Iain Murray, 10th Duke of Atholl (1931–1996), Scottish peer and forestry expert

== Fictional characters ==
- George Murray, a character in Actor's and Sin

== See also ==
- George V. Murry (1948–2020), American bishop
