= Alumni and staff of Latymer Upper School =

Many alumni and staff of Latymer Upper School have become notable in their own right.

== Alumni ==
=== Politics ===
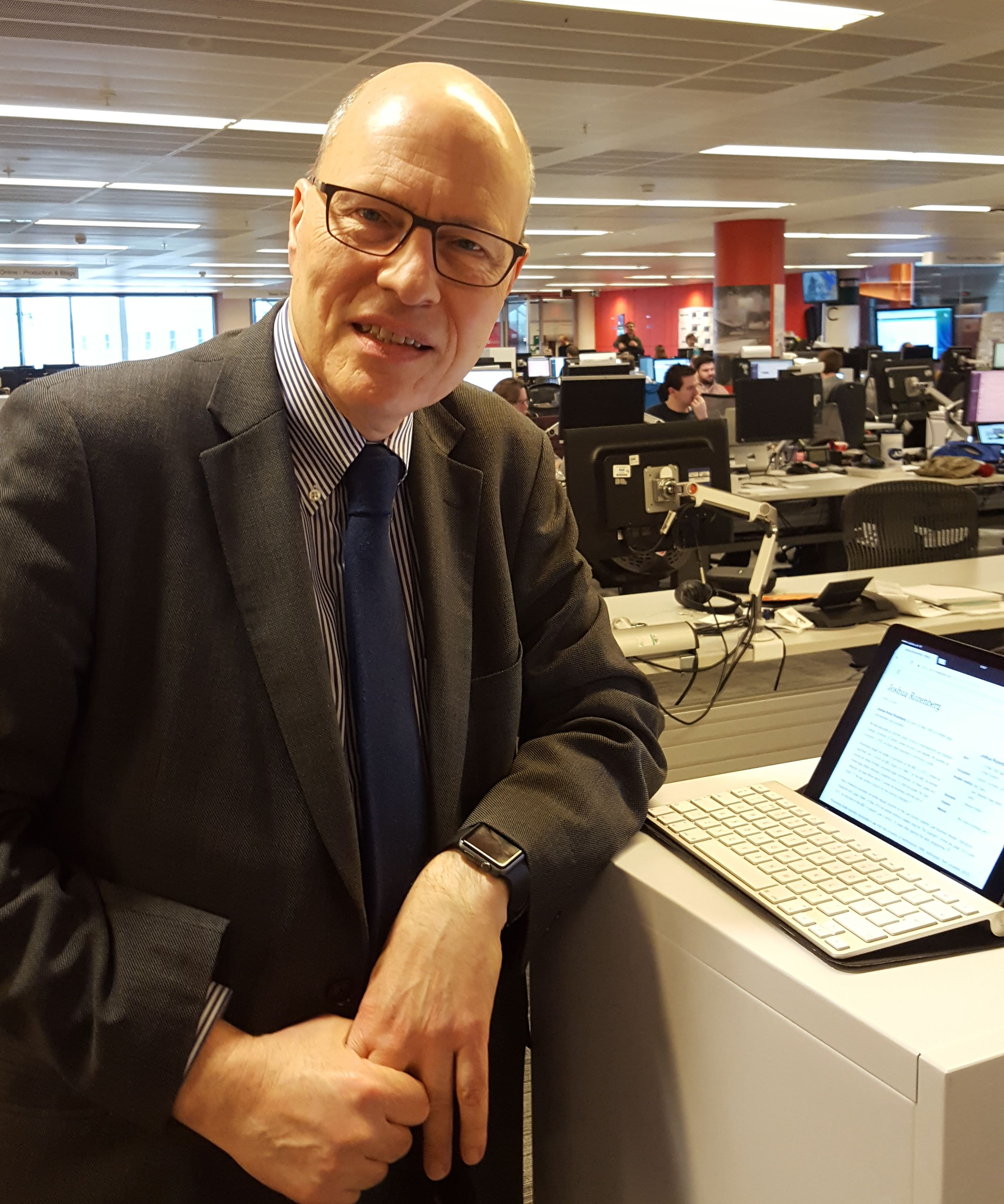
Joshua Rozenberg, journalist

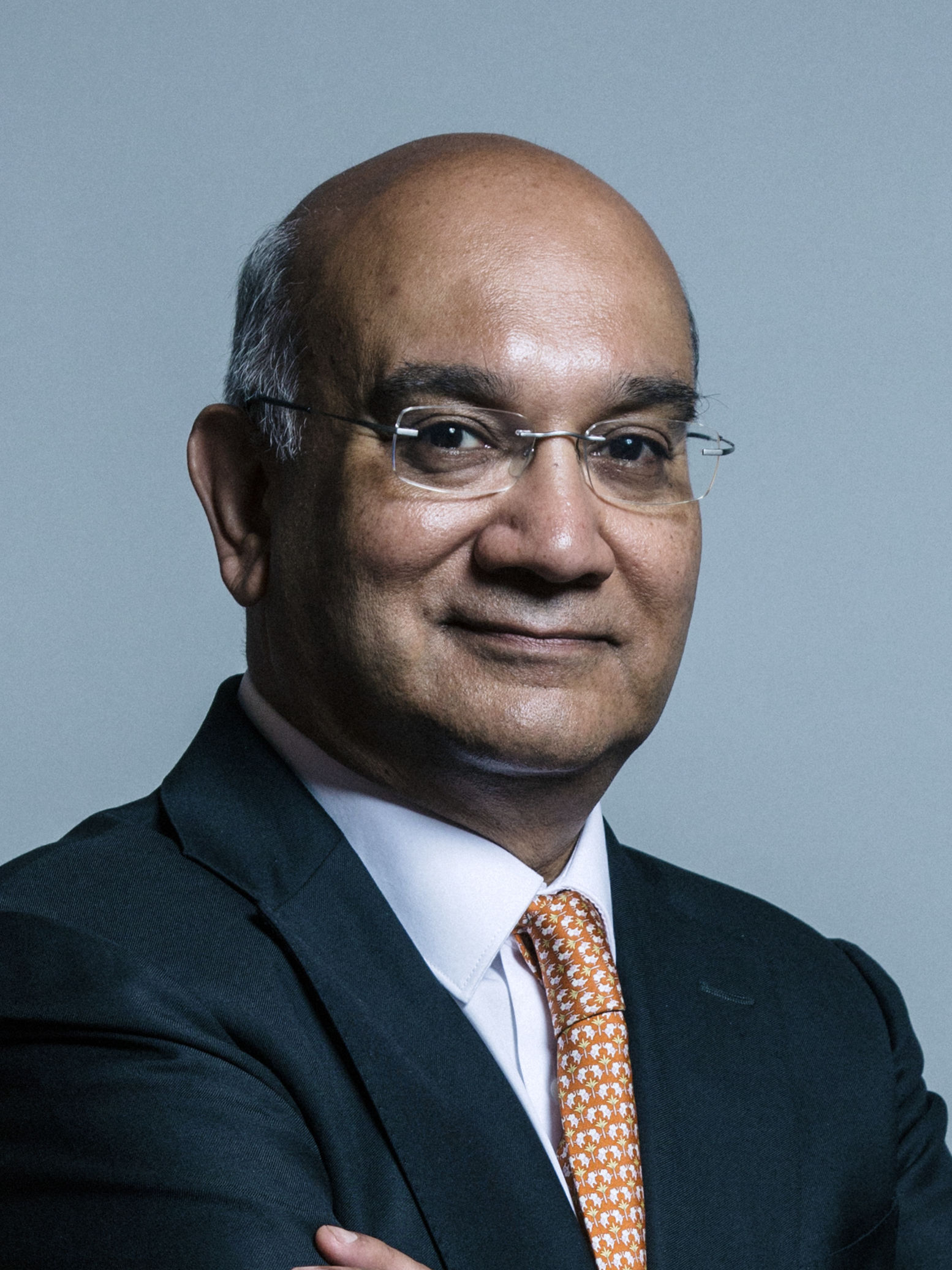
Keith Vaz, Member of Parliament

- John Beckett (1894–1964), fascist politician
- Peter Hendy, Minister of State for Rail
- Alan Hunt, diplomat
- John Killick (1919–2004), ambassador
- Ian Percival (1921–1998), Solicitor General
- Joshua Rozenberg, legal affairs correspondent for the Daily Telegraph
- Andy Slaughter, Labour MP for Hammersmith
- Keith Vaz, Labour MP for Leicester East
- Peter Walker (1932–2010), Cabinet Minister
- Larry Whitty, General Secretary of the Labour Party
- George Walden, Education Minister
- John Crace, journalist

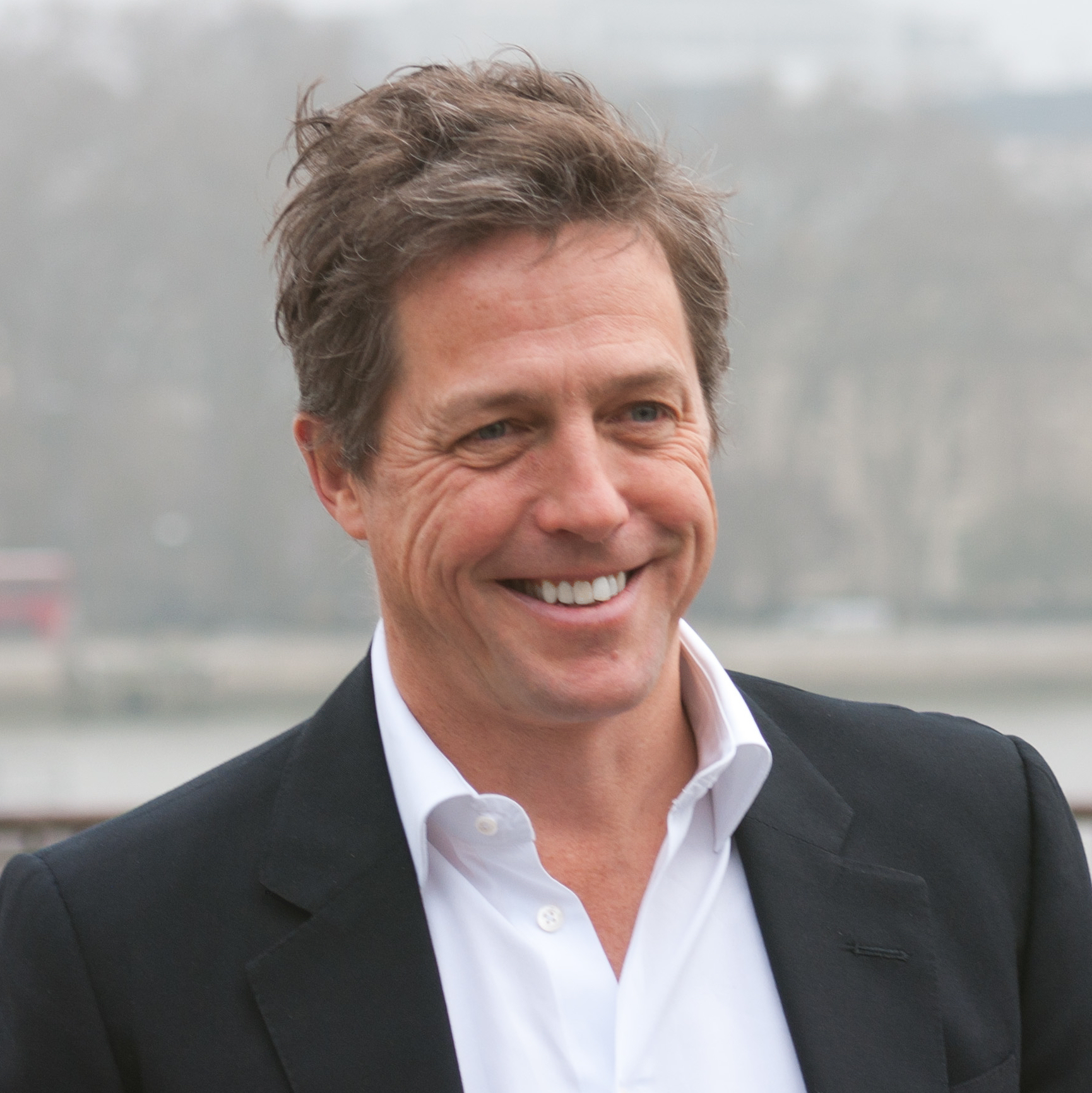
Hugh Grant, actor

=== Film and theatre ===
- Natalie Abrahami, theatre director
- Lily Cole, actress and model
- Hugh Grant, actor
- Martyn Green (1899–1975), actor, singer, comedian
- Christopher Guard, actor
- Ophelia Lovibond, actress
- Calam Lynch, actor
- Imogen Poots, actress
- Augustus Prew, actor
- Toby Regbo, actor
- Alan Rickman (1946–2016), actor
- Mel Smith (1952–2013), actor and film director
- Sean Teale, actor
- Rufus Jones, actor
- Gordon McDougall, theatre director

=== Music ===
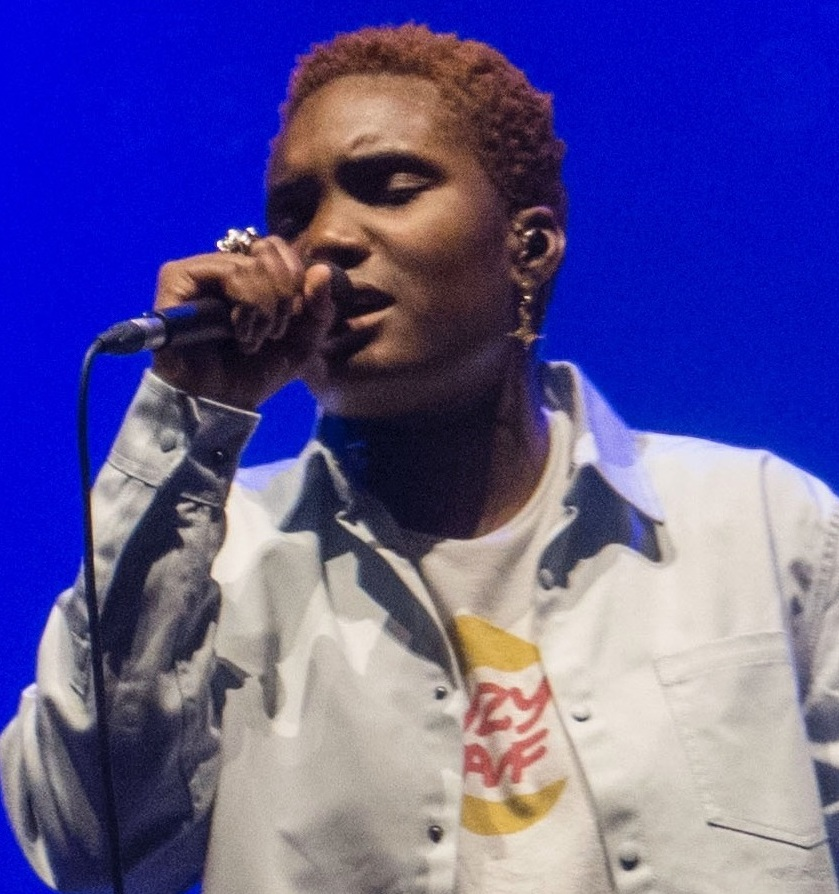
Arlo Parks, singer

Raphael Wallfisch, cellist

- Walter Legge (1906–1979), record producer, founder of the Philharmonia Orchestra
- Charlie Morgan, musician
- Jamie Quinn, known as Matrix
- Arlo Parks, singer
- Jay Sean, singer
- John Tilbury, pianist
- Cliff Townshend (1916–1986), jazz musician
- Raphael Wallfisch, cellist

=== Sport ===
- Andy Holmes (1959–2010), Olympic gold medal rower
- Antony Hooper, cricketer
- Simon Hughes, cricketer
- Hugh Jones, athlete
- Dan Luger, rugby player
- Dominic Waldouck, rugby player

=== Other fields ===
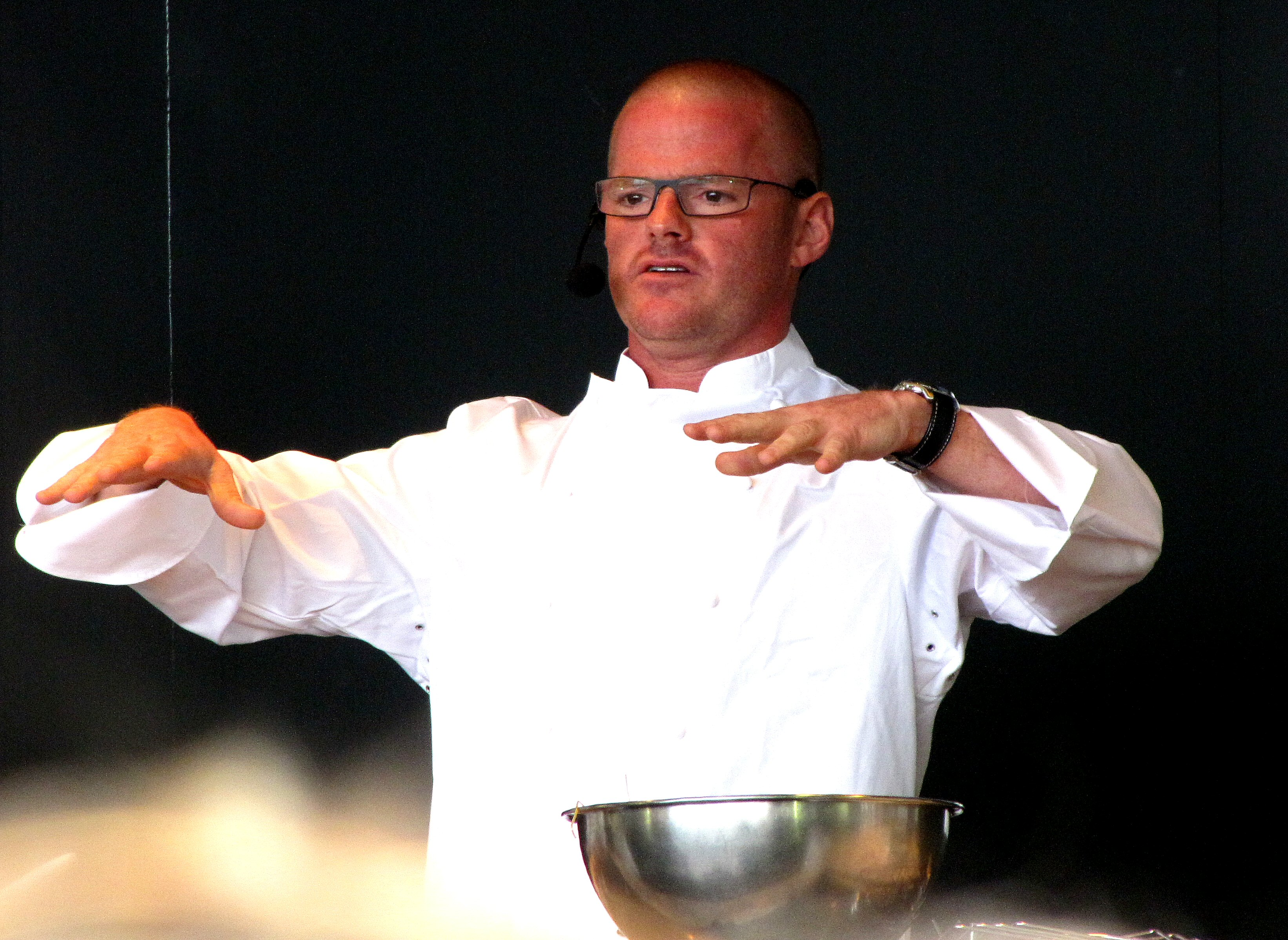
Heston Blumenthal, chef

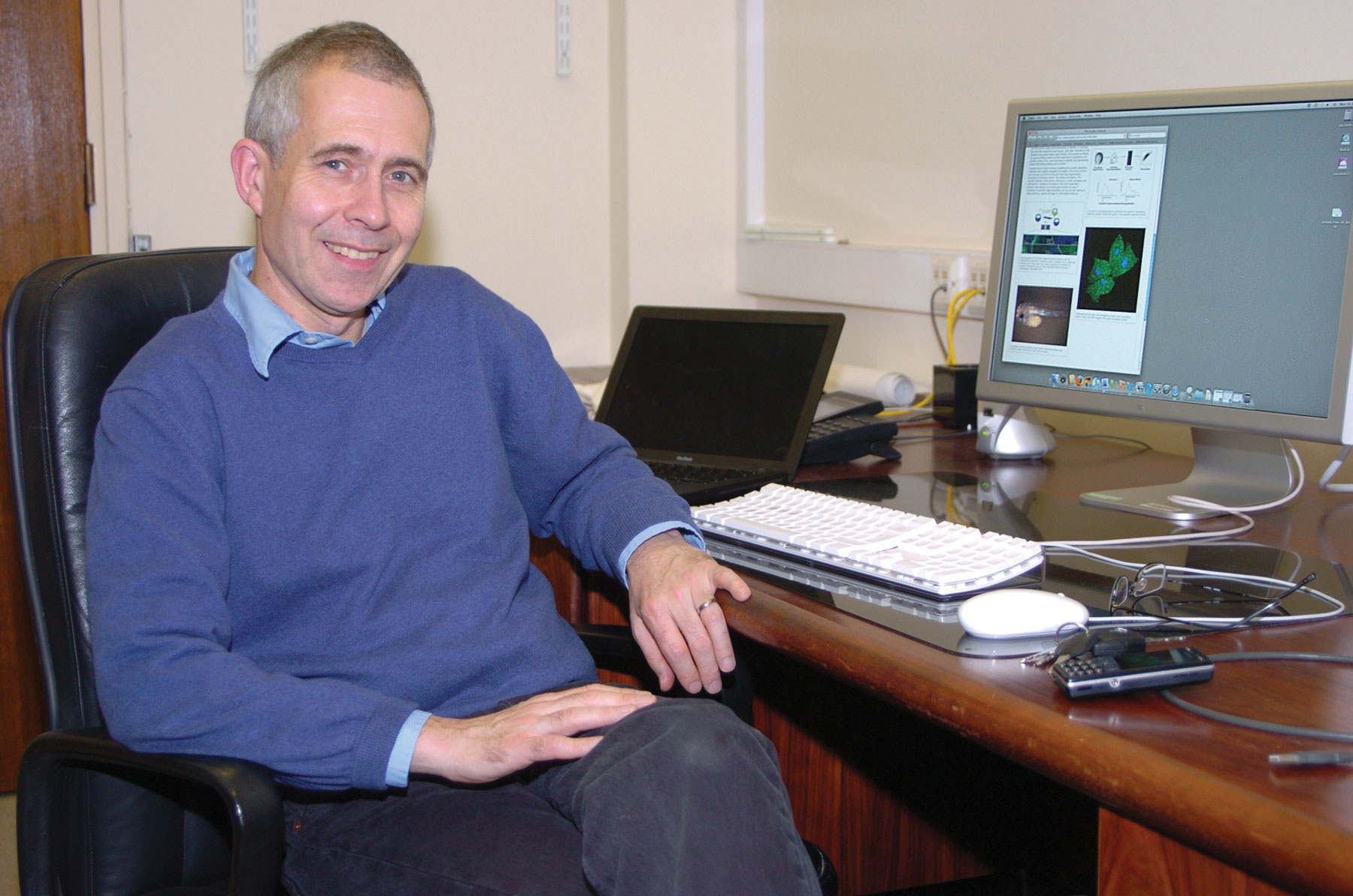
Jim Smith, biologist

- Heston Blumenthal, TV chef and owner of The Fat Duck
- Ajahn Brahm, Buddhist monk
- Gordon Brook-Shepherd (1918–2004), author
- Thomas Haller Cooper (1919–1987?), member of the Waffen SS's British Free Corps
- Peter Farquhar (1946–2015), teacher
- Richard Jackson, Bishop of Hereford
- Harold Spencer Jones (1890–1960), Astronomer Royal
- Philip I. Murray, professor of ophthalmology
- John D. Ray, Egyptologist
- Jerry Roberts (1920–2014), wartime codebreaker at Bletchley Park
- Samir Shah, Chairman of the BBC
- David Shoenberg (1911–2004), physicist
- Jim Smith, biologist
- Allegra Stratton, journalist
- Terence Tiller (1916–1987), poet and radio producer
- David Tress, painter
- Fred Vine (1939–2024), geologist and co-discoverer of plate tectonics
- Arthur Earnest Watkins (1898–1967), botanist
- Geoff Whitty (1946–2018), sociologist

== Former staff ==
- Peter Jacobs, piano
- Max Kenworthy, music
- Robert King (conductor), music
