= Catherine Murray =

Catherine Murray may refer to:

- Catherine Murray, child witness to apparition at Knock
- Catherine Murray, Countess of Dunmore (1814–1886), British peeress
- Catherine Murray di Montezemolo (1925–2009), fashion editor
- Kathryn Murray, wife of Arthur Murray
- Katharine Isabelle (Katherine Isobel Murray, born 1981), actress
- Katharine Stewart-Murray, Duchess of Atholl (1874–1960), Scottish noblewoman and politician
- Catherine Murray, Lady Abercairny, Scottish aristocrat
- Catherine Murray, Countess of Dysart (died 1649), Scottish noblewoman

== See also ==
- Kate Murray (disambiguation)
- Murray (surname)
