= Muiredach =

Muiredach (Old Irish), Muireadhach or Muireach, anglicized variously to Murdoch, Murtagh, Murray, Murdac, Mordacq and other forms, is a Goidelic name (meaning "chieftain") popular in Scotland and Ireland in the Middle Ages:

- Muiredach Bolgrach, mythological Irish king
- Muiredach Tirech, legendary high-king of Ireland
- Muiredach mac Eógain (died 489), legendary early king of Ailech
- Muiredach Muinderg (died 489), legendary king of the Ulaid
- Muiredach of Killala, reputed early Irish saint
- Muiredach Muillethan (died 702), king of Connaught
- Muiredach mac Ainbcellaig (died c. 770), king of Dál Riata
- Muiredach mac Murchado (died 760), king of Leinster
- Muiredach mac Brain (died 818) (8th-century–818), king of Leinster
- Muiredach mac Ruadrach (8th-century–829), king of Leinster
- Muiredach mac Eochada (died 839), king of the Ulaid
- Muiredach mac Brain (died 885), king of Munster
- Muiredach mac Eochocáin (died 895), king of the Ulaid
- Muireadhach Ua Carthaigh (died 1067), Chief Poet of Connacht
- Muireadhach Ua Dubhthaigh, Archbishop of Connacht
- Muireadhach Ua Flaithbheartaigh (died 1121), King of Iar Connacht
- Muiredach (ealdorman) (fl. 958–963), ealdorman
- Muireadhach I, Earl of Menteith (fl. 12th-century–13th-century), Scottish mormaer
- Muireadhach Albanach (fl. early 12th-century–13th-century), Gaelic poet and crusader
- Muireadhach II, Earl of Menteith (died c. 1230), Scottish mormaer
- Muireadhach III, Earl of Menteith (died 1332), Scottish mormaer
- Muireadhach of Inchaffray (died 1340s), Scottish abbot
- Muireadhach Sdíbhard or Muireadhach IV, Earl of Menteith (died 1425), Scottish prince
- Muredach Dynan (1938-2021), educationalist

== See also ==
- List of Irish-language given names
- Murchadh
