= Alison Murray =

Alison Murray may refer to:

- Alison Murray (director), Canadian director of films, documentaries and music videos
- Alison Murray (author), Scottish children's author and illustrator
- Alison Murray (scientist), American microbial ecologist and Antarctic researcher
