= Kevin Murray =

Kevin Murray is the name of:

- Kevin Murray (Australian footballer) (born 1938), Australian rules footballer
- Kevin Murray (politician) (1960–2026), American politician in California
- Kevin Murray (American football) (born 1964), College quarterback and current high school coach
- Kevin Murray (hurler) (born 1972), Irish hurler for Cork and Cloughduv
- Kevin Murray (Irish footballer), Irish Association football player in 1960s
- Kevin Murray (cricketer) (born 1963), English county cricketer

== See also ==
- Murray (surname)
