= Rachel O'Neill =

American biologist

- Born: Rachel Janet Waugh
- Education: University of Texas at Austin (B.A.); La Trobe University (Ph.D)
- Organizations: University of Connecticut
- Scientific career
- Thesis: Rapid genome evolution : studies of speciation and Haldane's Rule in marsupials (1997)

Rachel Janet Waugh O'Neill is the Board of Trustees Distinguished Professor at the University of Connecticut. She is known for her work in molecular genetics and computational biology, with a particular focus on the stability of genomes over long time periods.

== Education and career ==
O'Neill received her B.A. from the University of Texas at Austin in 1992, and then earned her Ph.D. from La Trobe University in 1997. As of 2026, she is the Board of Trustees Distinguished Professor at the University of Connecticut.

== Research ==
O'Neill is known for her use of genomics tools to examine how genomes remain stable over time and how they change over time. She has led research into the a complete map of the genome of a tammar wallaby, and been part of teams sequencing genomes from people and other mammals. In 2026 O'Neill joined a team led by Alison Murray that seeks to sequence the genomes of all organisms on Antarctica.

== Awards and honors ==
In 2011 O'Neill was received a Women of Innovation Award from the Connecticut Technology Council. She was elected to the Connecticut Academy of Science and Engineering in 2020.

== Selected publications ==
- O'Neill, Rachel J. Waugh; O'Neill, Michael J.; Graves, Jennifer A. Marshall (1998-05-07). "Undermethylation associated with retroelement activation and chromosome remodelling in an interspecific mammalian hybrid". Nature. 393 (6680): 68–72. doi:10.1038/29985. ISSN 0028-0836.
- Nurk, Sergey; et al. (2022). "The complete sequence of a human genome". Science. 376 (6588): 44–53. doi:10.1126/science.abj6987. ISSN 0036-8075. PMC 9186530. PMID 35357919.
- Hartley, Gabrielle A.; Okhovat, Mariam; Hoyt, Savannah J.; Fuller, Emily; Pauloski, Nicole; Alexandre, Nicolas; Alexandrov, Ivan; Drennan, Ryan; Dubocanin, Danilo; Gilbert, David M.; Mao, Yizi; McCann, Christine; Neph, Shane; Ryabov, Fedor; Sasaki, Takayo; Storer, Jessica M.; Svendsen, Derek; Troy, William; Wells, Jackson; Core, Leighton; Stergachis, Andrew; Carbone, Lucia; O’Neill, Rachel J. (2025). "Centromeric transposable elements and epigenetic status drive karyotypic variation in the eastern hoolock gibbon". Cell Genomics. 5 (4): 100808. doi:10.1016/j.xgen.2025.100808. PMC 12008813. PMID 40088887.
- Castellano, Kate R; Neitzey, Michelle L; Starovoitov, Andrew; Barrett, Gabriel A; Reid, Noah M; Vuruputoor, Vidya S; Webster, Cynthia N; Storer, Jessica M; Pauloski, Nicole R; Ameral, Natalie J; McEvoy, Susan L; McManus, M Conor; Puritz, Jonathan B; Wegrzyn, Jill L; O’Neill, Rachel J (2025-02-03). "Genome Assembly of a Living Fossil, the Atlantic Horseshoe Crab Limulus polyphemus , Reveals Lineage-Specific Whole-Genome Duplications, Transposable Element-Based Centromeres, and a ZW Sex Chromosome System". Molecular Biology and Evolution. 42 (2). doi:10.1093/molbev/msaf021. ISSN 0737-4038. PMC 11836539. PMID 39907027.
