= Muireadhaigh =

Ó Muireadhaigh, Mac Muireadhaigh, and MacMuireadhaigh are Gaelic surnames. They translate as "descendant of Muireadhach" and "son of Muireadhach", respectively, which have been anglicised as Murray and Morrow in southwestern Scotland, northeastern Connacht and County Cavan.

The name Morrow is found primarily in Counties Donegal, Antrim, Down and Armagh which is due to Scottish settlement in those areas.

== Notable people ==
- Diarmuid Mac Muireadhaigh, Irish poet
- Donatus Ó Muireadhaigh (died 1485), Archbishop of Tuam
- Lorcán Ó Muireadhaigh (1883–1941), Irish Roman Catholic priest, educator and activist

== See also ==
- List of Irish-language given names
- Muireadhach
