= Robert Morey =

Robert Morey may refer to:

- Robert Morey (baseball) (born 1988), American baseball player
- Robert Morey (pastor) (1946–2019), American Christian evangelical pastor
- Robert Morey (rower) (1936–2019), American Olympic rower

== See also ==
- Robert Moray (1608/09–1673), Scottish philosopher
- Robert Murray (disambiguation)
