= Andrew Moray (disambiguation) =

Andrew Moray may refer to:

- Andreas de Moravia (died 1242), Bishop of Moray, 1222–1242
- Andrew Moray (died 1297), joint-commander with William Wallace of the Scottish army at the Battle of Stirling Bridge
- Andrew Moray (justiciar) (died 1298), Lord of Petty, Justiciar of Scotia
- Andrew Murray (soldier) (1298–1338), his son who fought for David II

== See also ==
- Andrew Murray (disambiguation)
