= Stephen Murray =

Stephen, Steven, Steve, or Stevie Murray may refer to:

- Stephen Murray (actor) (1912–1983), English cinema, radio, theatre and television actor
- Stephen Murray (BMX rider) (born 1980), English former BMX rider
- Stephen Murray (footballer) (born 1913), Scottish football player
- Stephen Murray (historian) (born 1945), British architectural historian
- Stephen Murray (local politician) (1908–1944), English barrister and farmer
- Stephen Murray, American musician and co-founder of Beatles tribute Studio Two
- Stephen O. Murray (born 1950), American sociologist and anthropologist
- Stephen P. Murray, private equity investor and philanthropist
- Steven Murray (footballer) (born 1967), Scottish professional footballer
- Steven Murray (born 1975), Canadian cartoonist better known by his pen name Chip Zdarsky
- Steven T. Murray (born 1943), American translator
- Steve Murray (footballer) (born 1944), Scottish professional footballer
- Steve Murray (politician), Australian politician
- Stevie Murray (born 1983), Scottish footballer

== Fictional characters ==
- Steve Murray (Brookside), Brookside character
