= Alan Murray =

Alan Murray may refer to:

- Alan Murray (footballer) (1949–2026), English football manager
- Alan Robert Murray (1954–2021), sound editor
- Alan Murray (golfer) (1940–2019), Australian golfer
- Alan T. Murray, American geographer and academic
- Alan V. Murray, Scottish historian and philologist

== See also ==
- Allan Murray (disambiguation)
