= Albert Murray =

Albert Murray may refer to:

- Albert Murray (artist) (1906–1992), American naval combat artist
- Albert Murray (writer) (1916–2013), American literary and music critic, novelist, essayist, and biographer
- Albert Murray (golfer), English-born Canadian golfer
- Albert Murray, Baron Murray of Gravesend (1930–1980), British Labour Party politician, Member of Parliament 1964– 1970
- Bert Murray (born 1942), English football player
