= Andrew Murray =

Andrew or Andy Murray may refer to:

== Arts and entertainment ==
- Andrew Nicholas Murray (1879–1929), British novelist and children's writer
- Andrew Murray (children's writer) (born 1970), English children's writer
- Andrew Hunter Murray (born 1987), British writer, podcaster and comedian
- Andrew Murray (singer), Danish singer
- Andrew Murray (River City), fictional character

== Law and politics ==
- Andrew Murray, 1st Viscount Dunedin (1849–1942), Scottish politician and judge
- Andrew F. Murray (1877–1932), New York assemblyman
- Sir Andrew Murray (Scottish politician) (1903–1977), Lord Provost of Edinburgh
- Andrew Murray (Australian politician) (born 1947), member of the Australian Senate
- R. Andrew Murray, American attorney

== Science and medicine ==
- Andrew Murray (naturalist) (1812–1878), Scottish botanist and entomologist
- Andrew Murray (doctor) (born 1980), Scottish doctor, runner and author who works for the Scottish Government
- Andrew Murray (physiologist), lecturer in physiology, University of Cambridge
- Andrew W. Murray, American biologist
- Andrew Russell Murray (1910–1955), Australian orthopaedic surgeon

== Scots of the Wars of Independence ==
- Andrew Moray (justiciar) (died 1298), or Sir Andrew Murray of Petty, Justiciar of Scotia
- Andrew Moray (died 1297), or Sir Andrew Murray, leader of the Scots during the Scottish Wars of Independence, son of the above
- Andrew Murray (soldier) (1298–1338), Scots general of the 2nd Scottish War of Independence, Scottish head-of-state (Guardian of Scotland) twice; posthumous son of the above

== Sports ==
- Andy Murray (ice hockey) (born 1951), Canadian ice hockey player and coach
- Andrew Murray (golfer) (born 1956), English golfer
- Andrew Murray (Guyanese boxer) (1971–2002), Guyanese boxer
- Andrew Murray (ice hockey) (born 1981), Canadian ice hockey player
- Andy Murray (boxer) (born 1982), Irish professional boxer
- Andy Murray (born 1987), Scottish tennis player

== Others ==
- Andrew Murray, 1st Lord Balvaird (1597?–1644), minister of the Church of Scotland and peer
- Andrew Murray (journalist) (1813–1880), Australian journalist
- Andrew Murray (minister) (1828–1917), South African religious minister, missionary, and author
- Andrew Murray (trade unionist) (born 1958), British trade union official and journalist; former member of the Communist Party of Britain

== See also ==
- Andy Burnham (Andrew Murray Burnham, born 1970), leader of the UK Labour Party and current Prime Minister of the United Kingdom
