= Charlie Murray =

Charlie Murray may refer to:

- Charlie Murray (umpire), Australian rules football player and coach
- Charlie Murray (golfer) (1882–1938), Canadian golfer
- Charlie Murray (rugby league), Australian rugby league player
