= Andrew Tallon =

Belgian art historian (1969-2018)

Andrew J. Tallon
- Tallon at Vassar College
- Born: 12 March 1969; Leuven, Belgium
- Died: 16 November 2018 (aged 49); Poughkeepsie, New York, U.S.
- Education: Princeton University, Paris-Sorbonne University, Columbia University
- Occupation: Art historian
- Known for: Computer-mapping Notre-Dame de Paris
- Spouse: Marie Tallon-Daudruy
- Children: 4

Andrew J. Tallon (12 March 1969 – 16 November 2018) was a Belgian-American art historian. He used lasers to create a precise model of Notre-Dame de Paris, among other buildings.

== Early life and education ==
Tallon was born on 12 March 1969 in Leuven, Belgium to mother Mary Beth Tallon Vander Vennet and father Andrew F. Tallon. In the fourth grade, Tallon lived in Paris while his mother worked on a dissertation in theater history. He attended high school in the US, graduating from Shorewood High School in Wisconsin. Tallon attended Princeton University for his undergraduate studies where he earned a degree in music in 1991. While enrolled, however, he took every class taught by Robert Mark—an engineer specializing in Gothic architecture and construction. He received an MA at Paris-Sorbonne University and a PhD at Columbia University under the advisement of Stephen Murray, an art historian.

== Career ==
Beginning in 2007, Tallon worked at Vassar College in the Department of Art. Tallon described himself as "obsessed" with Notre-Dame de Paris. He used laser scanners to map the interior and exterior of the Notre-Dame, as well as 45 other historical buildings. Tallon began scanning Notre-Dame in 2010 with Paul Blaer, going over the interior and exterior of the building. All told, they repositioned the scanner fifty times for comprehensive detail, resulting in over one billion points of data. After the Notre-Dame de Paris fire in 2019, Tallon's work mapping the building's interior is used as a resource for planned reconstruction. In addition to Paris, other French cathedrals he mapped were in Bourges, Chartres, and Sens. Along with Stephen Murray, Tallon initiated the Mapping Gothic France project, which was funded by a grant from the Andrew W. Mellon Foundation. Mapping Gothic France is an open source project created to "establish linkages between the architectural space of individual buildings, geo-political space, and the social space resulting from the interaction (collaboration and conflict) between multiple agents—builders and users".

In December 2014, Tallon mapped the Canterbury Cathedral in England, collecting 5.5 billion data points over the course of two and a half days. Tallon repositioned the scanner slightly fewer than one hundred times to obtain comprehensive coverage. This work resulted in the first accurate sectional views of the cathedral.

Tallon was a member of the Society of Architectural Historians from 2006 to 2017. He was a founder of the Friends of Notre-Dame Foundation, a US-based organization that sought to collect donations for maintenance and renovations for Notre-Dame.

== Awards and honors ==
Tallon contributed to a television documentary called Building the Great Cathedrals which first aired on Nova (part of PBS) in 2010. The program received two Emmy nominations: for Outstanding Science and Technology Programming, and for Outstanding Cinematography, News Coverage/Documentaries.

An art exhibition based on Tallon's work was displayed in Notre-Dame, called "Notre-Dame of Paris: Nine Centuries in the Life of a Cathedral".

== Personal life ==
Tallon was married to Marie Tallon-Daudruy and had four children.

Tallon died of brain cancer on 16 November 2018 at his home in Poughkeepsie, New York.

== Selected publications ==
- Nikolinakou, Maria-Katerina; Tallon, Andrew J.; Ochsendorf, John A. (2005). "Structure and form of early Gothic flying buttresses". Revue Européenne de Génie Civil. 9 (9–10): 1191–1217. doi:10.1080/17747120.2005.9692807. S2CID 110516061.
- Tallon, Andrew (2014). "Divining Proportions in the Information Age". Architectural Histories. 2: 15. doi:10.5334/ah.bo.
- Sandron, Dany; Tallon, Andrew (2013). Notre-dame de Paris (in French). Parigramme. ISBN 978-2840967682.
