= Charles Murray =

Charles Murray may refer to:

== Politicians ==
- Charles Murray, 1st Earl of Dunmore (1661–1710), British peer
- Sir Charles Murray (diplomat) (1806–1895), British author and diplomat
- Charles Murray, 7th Earl of Dunmore (1841–1907), Scottish peer and Conservative politician
- Charles James Murray (1851–1929), British politician
- Charles Murray, Lord Murray (1866–1936), Scottish Conservative politician, lawyer and judge
- Charles de Bois Murray (1891–1974), Scottish judge, politician and writer
- C. Murray Turpin (1878–1946), member of the U.S. House of Representatives from Pennsylvania
- Ed Murray (Tennessee politician) (Charles Edward Murray, 1928–2009), American politician, speaker of the Tennessee House of Representatives

== Writers ==
- Charles Murray (poet) (1864–1941), poet who wrote in the Doric dialect of Scots
- Charles Shaar Murray (born 1951), English rock music writer

== Entertainers ==
- Charles Murray (American actor) (1872–1941), American actor from the silent era, also called Charlie Murray
- Charles Murray (Scottish actor) (1754–1821), Scottish actor and dramatist
- Chic Murray (Charles Murray, 1919–1985), Scottish comic

== Others ==
- Charles P. Murray Jr. (1921–2011), American soldier and Medal of Honor recipient
- Charles Murray (political scientist) (born 1943), American policy writer, co-wrote The Bell Curve and Losing Ground
- Charles Murray (boxer) (born 1968), American boxer, former light welterweight champion
- Charles Murray (bishop) (1889–1950), Anglican bishop of Riverina, Australia
- Charles Murray (trade unionist) (died 1889), British trade unionist and socialist activist
- Charles Fairfax Murray (1849–1919), English painter, dealer, collector, benefactor and art historian
- Charles I. Murray (1896–1977), United States Marine Corps general
- Charles Oliver Murray (1842–1923), Scottish engraver
- Charles Wilson Murray (1820–1873), English businessman and member of the Legislative Council of Hong Kong
- Charles Stewart Murray (1858–1903), superintendent of police in the British Raj
- Charles Wyndham Murray (1844–1928), British Army officer and politician

== See also ==
- Charlie Murray (disambiguation)
