= Judge Murray =

Judge Murray may refer to:

- Frank Jerome Murray (1904–1995), judge of the United States District Court for the District of Massachusetts
- Herbert Frazier Murray (1923–1999), judge of the United States District Court for the District of Maryland
- William Daniel Murray (1908–1994), judge of the United States District Court for the District of Montana

== See also ==
- Justice Murray (disambiguation)
