= George Crawford Murray =

American politician (1827–1884)

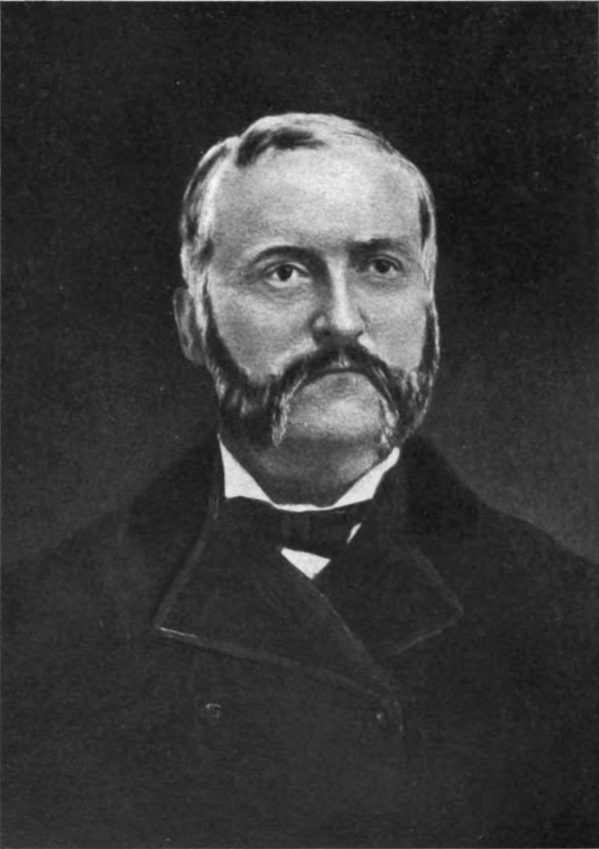

Member of the New Jersey Legislature
- In office 1863–1863

Personal details
- Born: January 3, 1827 Middletown Township, New Jersey, U.S.
- Died: November 27, 1884 (aged 57) Jersey City, New Jersey, U.S.
- Resting place: Middletown Township, New Jersey, U.S.
- Party: Independent
- Spouse: Mary Cooper (m. 1855)
- Children: 3
- Education: Yale College
- Occupation: Politician
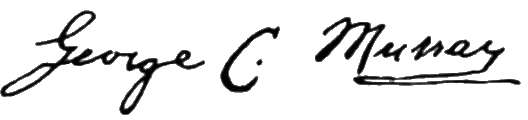
- Signature

George Crawford Murray (January 3, 1827 – November 27, 1884) was an American politician.

== Early life ==
George Crawford Murray, the son of Mary (née Crawford) and William W. Murray, was born on January 3, 1827, in Middletown Township, New Jersey. His father worked as a farmer, merchant and postmaster in Middletown. He graduated from Yale College in 1845. After leaving college, he studied law in Trenton, New Jersey, and with the Honorable George Wood in New York City, where he was admitted to the bar in January 1849. He then pursued a course of study in analytical chemistry in the newly established school of applied chemistry at Yale, and in the summer of 1850 returned to his home in Middletown to engage in farming.

== Career ==
Murray continued through life deeply interested in agricultural and analytical chemistry and in kindred scientific studies. He was elected to the New Jersey Legislature in the Fall of 1862 as an Independent, defeating William S. Horner. He served for one year in the Legislature, but declined a re-nomination. He also worked as a collector in Middletown Township.

== Personal life ==
Murray married on February 27, 1855, Mary Catherine Cooper, daughter of James Cooper, of Middletown, who survived him. Their children were two daughters and a son: Mary, Ella and George.

In February 1858, one of his feet was crushed by a caving in of earth on his farm, which caused him to use a cane.

== Death ==
Murray moved to Jersey City, New Jersey, where he died very suddenly, of paralysis of the heart, after having been for two months in feeble health, on November 24, 1884. He was interred in a family plot at Middletown.
