= Muiredach (ealdorman) =

Muiredach (fl. 958–963) was an ealdorman (Latin: dux) in northern England in the reign of Edgar the Peaceable. He is recorded in subscriptions to two royal charters.

The first, Sawyer 679, is a grant by King Edgar to Oscytel, Archbishop of York of 10 hides at Hutton in Nottinghamshire, where he is named Mirdach dux, ninth on the ealdorman list between Leod dux and Ascured dux.

His other appearance is in a newly discovered charter (found again 1983) issued by King Edgar to one Æthelferth, granting 5 hides at Ballidon in Derbyshire, where he is named Myrdah dux and appears eighth (last) in the ealdorman list, above Gunner dux. His name precedes Oslac dominus ("Lord Oslac"), who is probably Oslac, future ealdorman of Northumbria.

The names Mirdach and Myrdah represented the Goidelic name Muiredach, and he is thus thought to be of Gaelic or Norse-Gaelic origin. He may have been one of the Norse-Gaelic settlers resident in north-western Northumbria during the period.
