= Charlie Murray (umpire) =

Australian rules footballer, coach, and umpire

Charlie Murray was an Australian rules football player and coach.

He was recorded as playing for the Sydney Club around 1906 as a ruckman. He was chosen to represent NSW in the 1908 National Carnival in Melbourne. The Referee sporting newspaper said of him in the same year: Charles Murray is considered to be the finest follower in Sydney; Performed splendidly against Norwood (S.A. Club) and his aerial flights quite surprising the visitors. He began umpiring in 1912 when he officiated in a game between the crews of HMAS Protector and HMAS Psyche at the SCG. The Sydney Morning Herald lauded his efforts. Murray went on to umpire in Sydney until 1924 including six grand finals and several interstate games. He then moved to Melbourne where he regularly umpired in the VFA as well as his handful of games in the VFL.
