= Robert Murray (ice hockey, born 1951) =

Canadian-born German ice hockey player

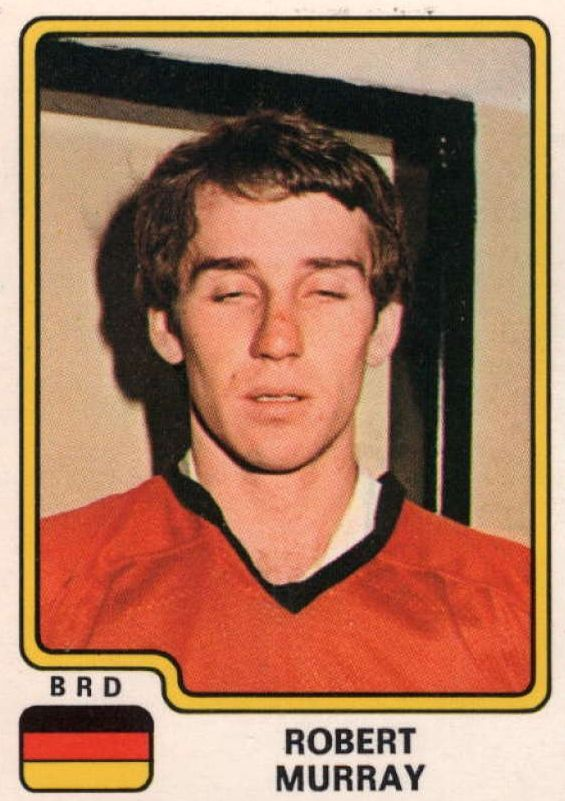
- Born: October 17, 1951 (age 73); Calgary, Alberta, Canada
- Height: 6 ft 0 in (183 cm)
- Weight: 180 lb (82 kg; 12 st 12 lb)
- Position: Defence
- Shot: Right
- Played for: Germany; SC Riessersee; ERC Freiburg; Adler Mannheim; Düsseldorfer EG; EV Landshut
- National team: West Germany
- NHL draft: Undrafted
- Playing career: 1978–1988

Robert Murray (born October 17, 1951) is a Canadian-born German former professional ice hockey defenceman.

== Career ==
Born in Calgary, Alberta, Canada, Murray played Canadian college hockey with the Mount Royal College cougars. He went on to play 10 seasons of professional hockey in Germany.

Murray competed as a member of the West Germany national ice hockey team at the 1978, 1979, and 1981 World Ice Hockey Championships.
