= Joseph Murray (1890s footballer) =

Scottish footballer

Personal information
- Place of birth: Aberdeen, Scotland
- Position: Winger

Senior career*
Years	Team	Apps	(Gls)
1893–1895	Dundee		
1895	Grimsby Town	2	(0)
1895–1896	Macclesfield	13	(5)
- * Club domestic league appearances and goals

Joseph Murray was a Scottish professional footballer who played as a winger for clubs including Dundee, Grimsby Town and Macclesfield.
