= Paul Murray =

Paul Murray may refer to:

- Paul Murray (admiral), South African Vice Admiral
- Paul Murray (author) (born 1975), Irish author of the book An Evening of Long Goodbyes
- Paul Murray (businessman) (born 1964), current director and former interim chairman of Rangers F.C.
- Paul Murray (footballer) (born 1976), English football player
- Paul Murray (journalist) (born 1950), journalist and former editor of The West Australian
- Paul Murray (musician), Canadian musician, member of the band Sandbox
- Paul Murray (poet) (born 1947), Irish poet, Catholic priest and spiritual writer; author of Aquinas at Prayer
- Paul Murray (presenter) (born 1978), Australian radio and television presenter currently at Sky News Australia
- Paul Murray (rugby union) (1905–1981), Irish rugby union international
- Paul Murray (skier) (born 1977), cross-country skier representing Australia at the 2006 Winter Olympics
- Paul D. Murray, British theologian

== See also ==
- Pauli Murray (Anna Pauline Murray, 1910–1985), African American civil-rights advocate, feminist, lawyer, writer, poet, teacher, and ordained Episcopal priest
- Paul Murry (1911–1989), American cartoonist and comics artist
