= Ian Murray =

Ian Murray may refer to:

- Ian Murray (bishop) (1932–2016), Scottish Roman Catholic bishop
- Ian Murray (footballer) (born 1981), Scottish football player and player-manager
- Ian Murray (Canadian politician) (born 1951), Canadian Member of Parliament
- Ian Murray (Scottish politician) (born 1976), MP for Edinburgh South
- Ian Murray (rugby union) (born 1970), Irish rugby union player and coach
- Ian Murray, winner of Scotland's Strongest Man in 1987 (see Strength athletics in the United Kingdom and Ireland)

== See also ==
- Ian Murray Mackerras (1898–1980), Australian zoologist
- Iain Murray (disambiguation)
