= George Murray (engineer) =

New Zealand civil engineer and surveyor

George Thomas Murray (4 November 1859 – 25 July 1947) was a New Zealand civil engineer and surveyor. He was born in Dunedin, New Zealand on 4 November 1859.
