= Robert Morey (baseball) =

American baseball pitcher

- Pitcher
- Born: November 27, 1988 (age 37); Virginia Beach, Virginia
- Bats: Right Throws: Right

CPBL debut
- March 29, 2016, for the Brother Elephants

CPBL statistics (through 2016 season)
- Win–loss record: 4–4
- Earned run average: 6.55
- Strikeouts: 65
- Stats at Baseball Reference

Teams
- Brother Elephants (2016)

Robert Hilton Morey (born November 27, 1988) is a former professional baseball pitcher. He has played in the Chinese Professional Baseball League for the Brother Elephants.

== Career ==
He was born in Virginia Beach, Virginia, where he attended Cape Henry High School. Though he was drafted by the Tampa Bay Devil Rays in the 29th round of the 2007 Major League Baseball draft – a couple picks ahead of pitcher Andrew Cashner – out of high school, he opted not to sign. Instead, he attended the University of Virginia, where he played from 2008 to 2010. In 2008, he went 2–0 with a 6.51 ERA in 16 relief appearances, striking out 30 batters in 27.2 innings. In 2009, he was 3–0 with a 3.33 ERA in 18 games (nine starts), striking out 84 batters in 67.2 frames. He also pitched for the Bourne Braves of the Cape Cod League that year, going 3–1. In October, he was ranked the 85th best college player in the United States by College Baseball Daily. In 2010, he went 9–4 with a 4.20 ERA in 16 starts. College teammates included Phil Gosselin and Jarrett Parker. He was drafted by the Marlins in the 5th round of the 2010 Major League Baseball draft, between pitchers Justin Grimm and Heath Hembree, and signed.

=== Miami Marlins ===
In his first professional season, 2010, Morey went 1–3 with a 3.65 ERA in 12 starts for the Greensboro Grasshoppers and the next year, he was 7–7 with a 5.14 ERA in 140 innings for the same club. He won Pitcher of the Week honors for the week of August 1 that year and led the team in games started with 25, innings pitched, strikeouts (107) and batters faced (630). He was also the only pitcher on the club to toss a complete game and a shutout and one of only four South Atlantic League hurlers to throw a shutout. With the Jupiter Hammerheads in 2012, Morey was 8–3 with a 3.84 ERA in 18 games (16 starts), leading the team in victories. He won another Player of the Week honor that year. He split 2013 between the Jacksonville Suns (103.1 innings pitched) and Triple-A New Orleans Zephyrs (10 IP), going a combined 4–8 with a 5.31 ERA. Prior to the start of the 2014 campaign, Morey pitched for the Marlins in the club's major league spring training camp. He pitched for the GCL Marlins, Jacksonville and New Orleans in 2014, going a combined 4–4 with a 4.48 ERA in 18 games (12 starts). He was 2–7 with a 4.55 ERA in 22 games (14 starts) for New Orleans in 2015.

=== Brother Elephants ===
Morey signed with the Brother Elephants of the Chinese Professional Baseball League in early 2016. He finished with a 6.55 ERA in over 68.2 innings pitched (9 starts and 17 relief appearances) before he was released on August 31, 2016.

=== Southern Maryland Blue Crabs ===
On April 18, 2018, Morey signed with the Southern Maryland Blue Crabs of the Atlantic League of Professional Baseball. He was released on April 26, 2018.

=== York Revolution ===
On April 25, 2019, Morey signed with the York Revolution of the Atlantic League of Professional Baseball. He was released on May 6, 2019.
