= Allan Murray =

Allan Murray may refer to:

- Allan Murray (Australian footballer) (born 1982), Australian rules footballer
- Allan Murray (footballer, born 1907) (1907–1995), English footballer
- Al Murray (ice hockey) (Allan Haines Murray, 1906–1982), Canadian ice hockey player
- Allan Murray (swimmer) (born 1972), Bahamian former swimmer
- Allan Murray Architects, an Edinburgh, Scotland-based architecture firm

== See also ==
- Alan Murray (disambiguation)
