= Richard Murray =

Richard Murray may refer to:

- Richard Murray (businessman), businessman and former chairman of Charlton Athletic F.C.
- Richard Murray (mathematician) (c. 1726–1799), provost of Trinity College, Dublin
- Richard Murray (Australian politician) (1840–1887), Irish-born Australian politician
- Richard Murray (triathlete) (born 1989), South African triathlete
- Richard Murray (cricketer) (1831–1861), Australian cricketer
- Richard Murray (priest) (1779–1854), Anglican priest
- Richard M. Murray, synthetic biologist
- Richard Paget Murray (1842–1908), clergyman, botanist and lepidopterist
- Richard R. Murray (born 1956), founder of Equity Schools Inc.
- Richard W. Murray (Rick Murray), geologist and oceanographer
- Richard William Murray (1819–1908), journalist and politician in the Cape Colony
- Rich Murray (baseball) (born 1957), first baseman in Major League Baseball
- Rich Murray (politician) (born 1957), Minnesota politician
