= Iain Murray =

Iain Murray may refer to:

- Iain Murray (author) (born 1931), British pastor and author
- Iain Murray, 10th Duke of Atholl (1931–1996), Scottish peer and landowner
- Iain Murray (politician), New Zealand member of parliament
- Iain Murray (sailor) (born 1958), Australian sailor and Yacht designer

== See also ==
- Ian Murray (disambiguation)
