= James Tiedje =

American scientist

James Michael Tiedje (born 1942) is University Distinguished Professor and the director of the NSF Center for Microbial Ecology (CME) at Michigan State University, as well as a Professor of Crop and Soil Sciences and Microbiology. He was elected to the National Academy of Sciences in 2003 and served as president of the American Society for Microbiology from 2004 to 2005. The Center he directed developed novel methods for microbial community analysis that have greatly expanded knowledge about complex microbial communities in soil, sediments, engineered systems, the oceans and within animals. He also created experiments to detect life on Mars that were carried aboard the Viking Mars landers.

He received a B.S. degree (1964) from Iowa State University and earned his M.S. (1966) and Ph.D. (1968) degrees from Cornell University.
