= George Murray (cricketer) =

Australian cricketer

Personal information
- Full name: George Ian Murray
- Born: 6 November 1940 (age 86); South Perth, Western Australia
- Batting: Left-handed
- Bowling: Right-arm fast-medium
- Role: Bowler

Domestic team information
- Years: Team
- 1964/65: Western Australia

Career statistics
Competition	First-class
Matches	1
Runs scored	1
Batting average	1.00
100s/50s	0/0
Top score	1
Balls bowled	146
Wickets	3
Bowling average	31.33
5 wickets in innings	0
10 wickets in match	0
Best bowling	2/44
Catches/stumpings	0/–
- Source: CricketArchive, 31 December 2012

George Ian Murray (born 6 November 1940) is a former Australian cricketer who played a single match for Western Australia during the 1964–65 season. Born in South Perth, Western Australia, Murray's sole match at first-class level came in November 1964, in a Sheffield Shield match against Victoria at the WACA Ground in Perth. The match, which was the first of the season, ended in a draw after four days. Murray, who bowled right-arm fast-medium but batted left-handed, opened the bowling with Laurie Mayne in both innings. He took only one wicket in Victoria's first innings, dismissing Ray Jordon, but finished with figures of 2/44 in the second innings. Murray did not play at state level again, with Western Australia's fast bowling stocks already including Mayne, Garth McKenzie, Des Hoare, and Jim Hubble, amongst others.
