= Robert Murray (educator) =

Scottish painter

Robert Murray D.A. (1888 – December 1967) was a Scottish painter.

"Robert Murray is remembered as a man of innate courtesy and kindliness, and all who had the privilege of knowing him well were the better for the experience."

== Teaching ==
Robert Murray taught at Robert Gordon's College (RGC), Aberdeen, Scotland. He is remembered affectionately by many of his former pupils. Murray impressed upon his pupils, his own high ideals, not only in their standards of attainment within the class but also in their conduct and aspirations beyond their school years.

Murray graduated at the Edinburgh College of Art and taught at Alan Glen's School and Kelso High School prior to his appointment at RGC in 1928. He possessed a great knowledge of the history of art and had a capacity for expressing his ideas in any form of creative art. His teaching methods were never stereotyped and factual, but were often en-livened by interludes of character-acting, or music. He was known, on occasion, to retire suddenly from the room, during a lesson on "pattern and rhythm," to reappear in a moment or two, with the School double-bass; and a highly-expectant class was not disappointed in the audible example of rhythm that followed. There was a virtuosity about his teaching, pupils were never aware of a dull routine, but were stimulated by the unexpected. He understood children, and thereby a relationship was established that produced the happiest results.

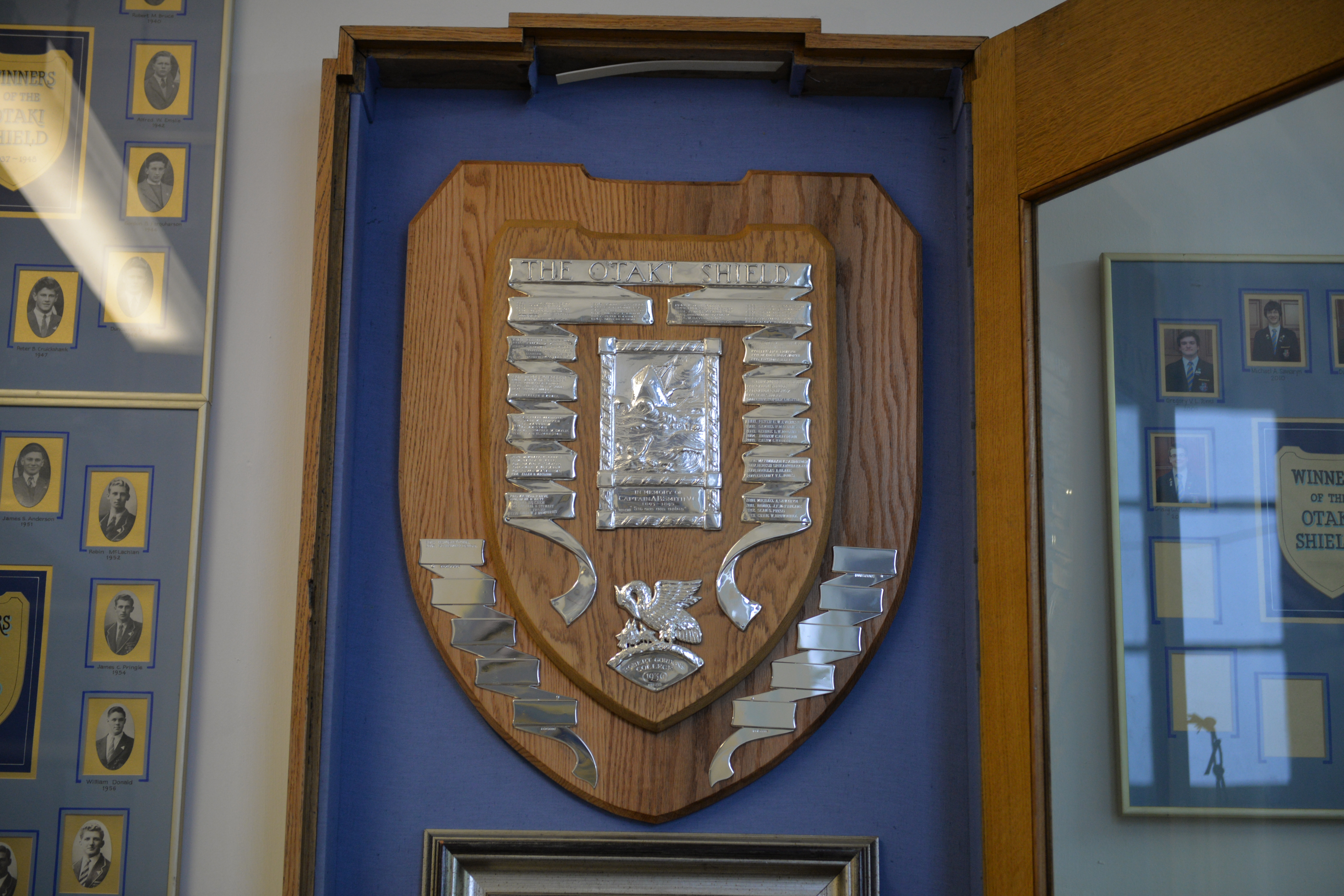
The Otaki Shield

"Young artists would return to his room with the keenest anticipation of the weekly lesson, for the Art Room was to them, not merely a place for instruction, but enclosed a world of fantasy and make-believe, peopled by extraordinary characters of Mr. Murray's creating."

Both the Robert Gordon's prize shields `Otaki' and 'Mackenzie' Shields, remain outstanding examples of his ability in design, and are only a part of his large contribution to the corporate life of RGC. Murray was a gifted artist. His exhibition in the MacRobert Hall in 1952 revealed his versatility in portraiture and in landscape painting, executed in a variety of media. His work has been shown in many exhibitions across Scotland, and in recognition of its merit he was, elected a full member of the Scottish Society of Artists. He also devoted much time and thought to work for the Educational Institute of Scotland of which he was Convener of the Art Section for ten years.

== Exhibitions ==
In 1952, Murray held an exhibition in the MacRobert Hall at RGC containing over 50 of his paintings.
