= Pat Murray =

Pat Murray may refer to:

- Pat Murray (American football) (born 1984), American football guard
- Patty Murray (born 1950), United States Senator from Washington
- Pat Murray (ice hockey) (born 1969), retired professional ice hockey player
- Pat Murray (baseball) (1897–1983), Major League Baseball pitcher
- Pat Murray (footballer) (1868–1925), Scottish footballer (Hibernian and Scotland)
- Pat Murray (rugby union) (born 1963), Irish rugby player

== See also ==
- Patrick Murray (disambiguation)
