= Hugh Murray =

Hugh Murray may refer to:

- Hugh Murray (footballer) (born 1979), Scottish professional footballer
- Hugh Murray (geographer) (1779–1846), Scottish geographer
- Hugh Murray (judge) (1825–1857), third Chief Justice of the Supreme Court of California
- Hugh Murray (rugby union) (1912–2003), Scottish international rugby union player
- Hugh Murray (triple jumper) (1935–2023), Scottish triple jumper
- Hugh Murray-Aynsley (1828–1917), Member of Parliament in Canterbury, New Zealand
- Hugh Murray (York historian) (1923–2013), a pre-eminent British historian of the city of York
- Muzz Murray (Hugh Washington Murray, 1891–1961), American ice hockey player

== See also ==
- Hugh Murray Shaw (1876–1934), Canadian federal politician
