= Matthew Murray (disambiguation) =

Matthew Murray (1765–1826) was an English steam engine and machine tool manufacturer.

Matthew or Matt Murray may also refer to:

- Matthew Murray (minister) (1735–1791), Scottish minister and Fellow of the Royal Society of Edinburgh
- Matthew Murray (writer) (born 1976), American theater critic and technology writer
- Matthew J. Murray (1983–2007), American murderer
- Matt Murray (Scottish footballer) (1929–2016), Scottish footballer
- Matt Murray (baseball) (1970–2025), American Major League Baseball pitcher
- Matt Murray (journalist) (born 1966), former editor of The Wall Street Journal
- Matt Murray (English footballer) (born 1981), English footballer
- Matt Murray (actor) (born 1989), American actor
- Matt Murray (ice hockey, born 1994), Canadian goaltender for the Toronto Maple Leafs
- Matt Murray (ice hockey, born 1998), Canadian goaltender for the Nashville Predators

== See also ==
- Mathew Murray, known professionally as Houston Bone (born 1993), Canadian filmmaker
