= Kevin Murray (cricketer) =

Australian-born English cricketer

Personal information
- Full name: Kevin Stuart Murray
- Born: 3 January 1963 (age 63); Brisbane, Queensland, Australia
- Batting: Left-handed

Domestic team information
- Years: Team
- 1984–1992: Berkshire

Career statistics
Competition	LA
Matches	2
Runs scored	1
Batting average	0.50
100s/50s	–/–
Top score	1
Balls bowled	–
Wickets	–
Bowling average	–
5 wickets in innings	–
10 wickets in match	–
Best bowling	–
Catches/stumpings	–/–
- Source: Cricinfo, 26 September 2010

Kevin Stuart Murray (born 3 January 1963) is an Australian born former English cricketer. Murray was a left-handed batsman. He was born at Brisbane, Queensland.

Murray made his Minor Counties Championship debut for Berkshire in 1984 against Cheshire. From 1984 to 1992, he represented the county in 26 Minor Counties Championship matches, the last of which came in the 1992 Championship when Berkshire played Cheshire. Murray also played in the MCCA Knockout Trophy for Berkshire. His debut in that competition came in 1986 when Berkshire played Buckinghamshire. From 1986 to 1992, he represented the county in 4 Trophy matches, the last of which came when Berkshire played Buckinghamshire in the 1992 MCCA Knockout Trophy.

Additionally, he also played 2 List-A matches for Berkshire. His List-A debut for the county came against Gloucestershire in the 1986 NatWest Trophy. His second and final List-A match came when Berkshire played Derbyshire in the 1992 NatWest Trophy, which was played at County Ground, Derby. In his 2 matches, he scored 1 run at a batting average of 0.50.
