= Andrew Murray (physiologist) =

British physiologist

Andrew James Murray is a British physiologist focused on mitochondria and the effects on their function of athletic condition, high altitude, disease, diet, and age. His work has included studies of the adaptations of the Sherpa people to high altitude, loss of appetite in mountain climbers, the negative cognitive effects of high-fat diets, and the development of ketone ester dietary supplements marketed by American company HVMN that have been claimed to enhance athletic performance.

Murray is originally from South Wales. He earned a doctorate in 2004 from the University of Oxford. He is a Professor in Metabolic Physiology in the Department of Physiology, Development and Neuroscience at the University of Cambridge and a Fellow of Trinity Hall, Cambridge.
