= Darren Murray =

Scottish footballer

Personal information
- Date of birth: 4 February 1976 (age 50)
- Place of birth: oldham, England
- Position: Striker

Senior career*
Years	Team	Apps	(Gls)
1997–1998	Cowdenbeath	15	(5)
1998–2001	Clyde	101	(28)
Total		116	(33)
- * Club domestic league appearances and goals

Darren Murray (born 4 February 1976) is a Scottish former professional footballer.

== Career ==
Murray began his senior career with Cowdenbeath. He had a short spell with Maryhill, and in the summer of 1998, he was part of the Junior revolution which swept through Clyde, being one of eleven players coming from the junior ranks to join the Bully Wee. He was a key figure in the team which won the Scottish Second Division championship in 2000.

Murray left Clyde in 2001. Since retiring Darren has worked in the security and delivery business
