= Yvonne Murray (disambiguation) =

Yvonne Murray may refer to:

- Yvonne Murray (born 1964), Scottish athlete
- Yvonne Murray (journalist), Irish journalist
- Yvonne Murray (singer), Canadian singer
