= Simon Murray =

Simon Murray may refer to:

- Simon Murray (businessman) (born 1940), British businessman and adventurer
- Simon Murray (cricketer) (born 1963), English cricketer
- Simon Murray (barrister) (born 1974), British barrister and minister
- Simon Murray (footballer) (born 1992), Scottish footballer
