= Joseph T. Murray =

American activist and businessman (1834–1907)

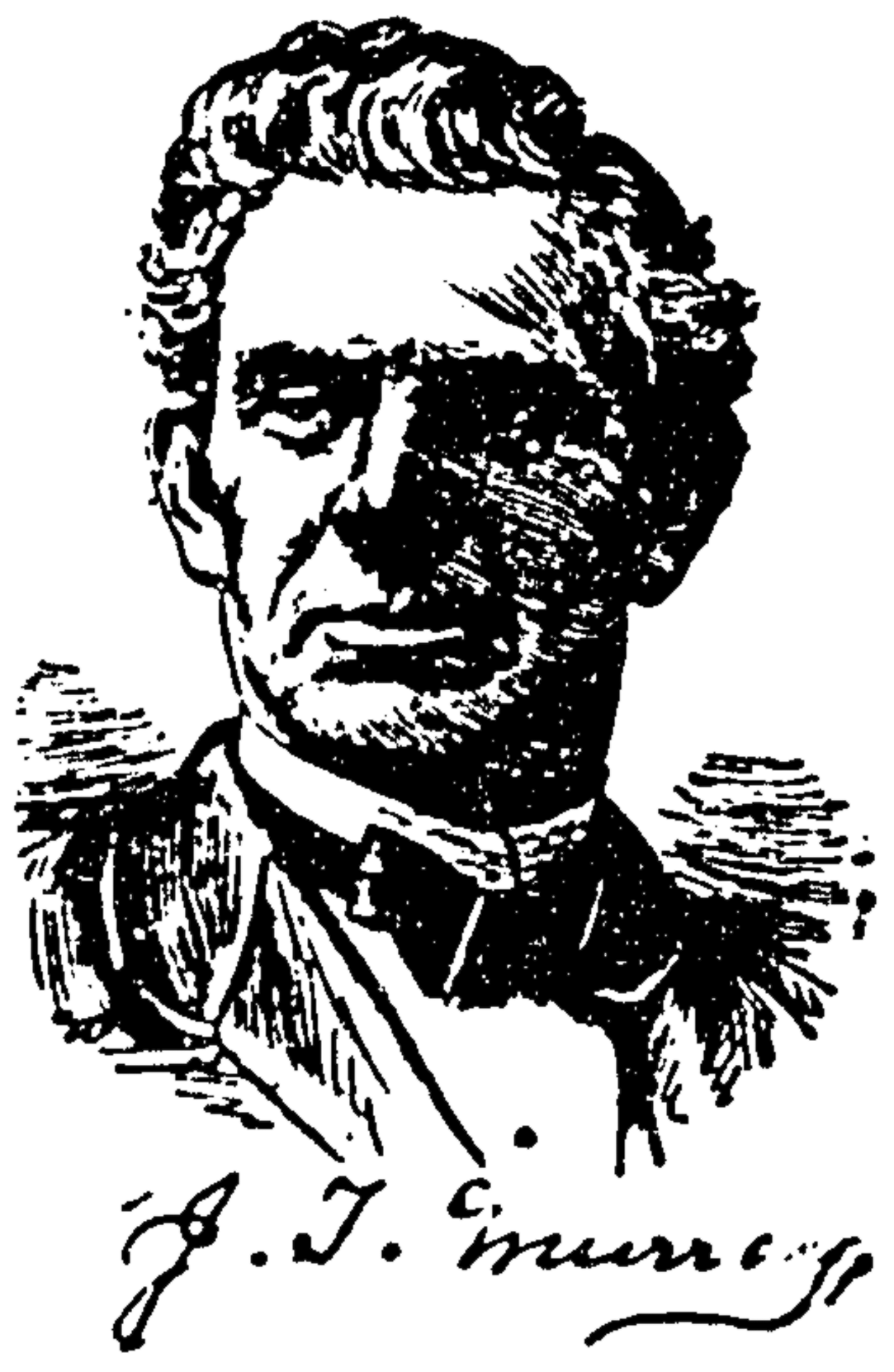
- Joseph T. Murray
- Born: Joseph Thomas Murray; May 12, 1834; Salem, Massachusetts, US
- Died: January 27, 1907 (aged 72); Springfield, Massachusetts, US

Joseph Thomas Murray (12 May 1834 in Salem, Massachusetts – 27 January 1907 in Springfield, Massachusetts) was an American abolitionist, manufacturer, and inventor. He was an early business associate of Thomas Edison.

== Early life ==
Joseph Thomas Murray was a son of James Murray (1787–1880), an English immigrant who was a mathematician and a reporter for the United States Senate during the War of 1812. His family moved in 1844 to Newark, New Jersey. At age eleven, he wanted to be a sailor and he sailed with his uncle to Africa. Due to the harassment by his uncle, the young Murray jumped ship at the first opportunity and lived for six months among the locals in Benin. There he first witnessed the effects of slavery.

After returning to Massachusetts, Murray began his training at the age of 14 at Everett Mills in Lawrence, Massachusetts, where he learned the mechanics trade and became a machinist. For two years he worked as postmaster in Danvers, Massachusetts.

== Abolitionism ==
Murray became an abolitionist in 1848 and, working with John Greenleaf Whittier and the mayor of Lynn, Massachusetts, James Needham Buffum, became a connection for the Underground Railroad and helped slaves to escape from the South to the North. He also had associations with William Lloyd Garrison and Wendell Phillips. The US Marshal Charles Devens once arrested Murray as he was smuggling a fugitive slave into Boston. During the American Civil War, Murray served in the 35th Regiment Massachusetts Volunteer Infantry.

== Association with Thomas Edison ==
In October 1870, Murray was hired by Thomas Alva Edison and George Harrington to work at American Telegraph Works, which manufactured telegraphic equipment. Together with Edison, he founded in February 1872, the small company J.T. Murray and Company, also producing telegraph equipment. In the third quarter of 1873, they reorganized as Edison and Murray and also assumed the operations of the recently defunct Edison and Unger company. Edison, Murray and the inventor Jarvis B. Edson incorporated the Domestic Telegraph Company in 1874. Although Edison and Murray formally dissolved in their partnership in July 1875, Edison continued to use and improve products manufactured by Murray.

== Later life and death ==
Murry continued his work as an inventor. At one point, his patents may have been worth $1,500,000 in the currency of the time. However, Murray's finances fluctuated drastically during the rest of his life.

In 1907, Joseph T. Murray died of pneumonia at the home of his daughter, May Murray, in Springfield, Massachusetts.

== Patents ==
- U.S. patent 413,081 - Journal Bearing - 1889-10-15
- U.S. patent 519,795 - Lamp Wick - 1894-05-15
