= Albert Murray (artist) =

American painter

Albert K. Murray
- Born: December 29, 1906
- Died: March 24, 1992 (aged 85)
- Education: Cornell University; Syracuse University

Albert Ketcham Murray (December 29, 1906 – March 24, 1992) was an American naval combat artist during World War II and a portraitist.

He was born in Emporia, Kansas. He studied at Cornell University and at Syracuse University's College of Fine Arts, where he graduated cum laude with a Bachelor of Fine Arts. At Syracuse, Murray was a member of the men's rowing crew from 1927 to 1930. He traveled to England and France for additional study and lived in Mexico for two years to receive instruction from Wayman Elbridge Adams.

During World War II, Murray was commissioned as a lieutenant of the Combat Art Section to produce portraits of members of the US Navy General Board. He fought in the Fourth Fleet and Eighth Fleet and sketched scenes of battle. Citing his bravery during this war, the US Navy awarded him the Bronze Star Medal. Murray was promoted to commander on October 3, 1945.

After the war, Murray continued making portraits of naval war heroes. He became director for the Navy Combat Art Collection and its Operation Palette. Murray died in 1992 while visiting Gainesville, Florida.

== Gallery ==
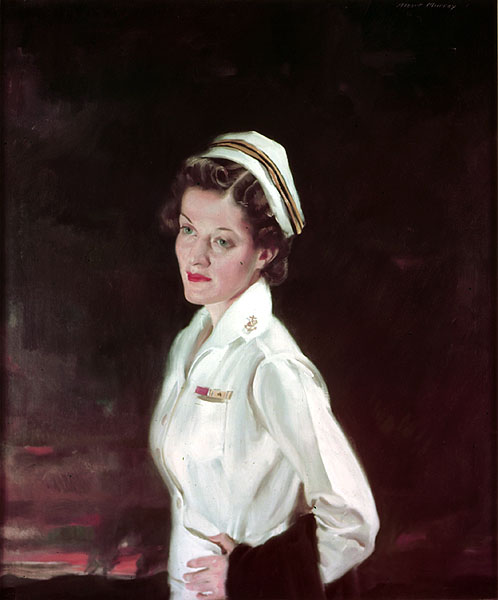
Portrait of Navy nurse Ann A. Bernatitus

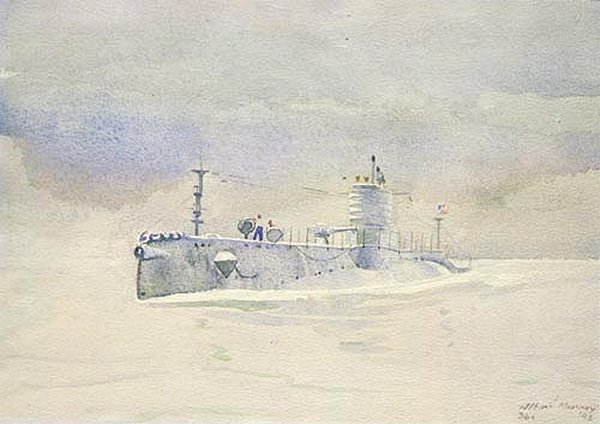
The submarine USS R-10 (SS-87) in watercolor
