= Patrick Murray =

Patrick Murray may refer to:

- Patrick Murray (actor) (1956–2025), English actor
- Patrick Murray (courtier), Scottish courtier active in religious struggles in the 1590s
- Patrick Murray (politician), 2010 and 2012 congressional candidate in Virginia
- Patrick Murray (sport shooter) (1945–2021), Australian sport shooter
- Patrick Murray (theologian) (1811–1882), Irish Roman Catholic theologian
- Patrick Desmond Fitzgerald Murray (1900–1967), English-born Australian zoologist
- Patrick Murray, 1st Earl of Tullibardine (died 1644), Scottish aristocrat
- Patrick Murray, 1st Lord Elibank (1632–1649), Scottish peer
- Patrick Murray, 5th Lord Elibank (1703–1778), author and economist
- Pato Banton (born Patrick Murray, born 1961), English reggae singer and toaster
- Paddy Murray (journalist) (1953–2022), Irish journalist and writer
- Paddy Murray (footballer) (1874–1925), Scottish footballer
- Patrick Murray (American football) (born 1991), American football placekicker
- Patrick Murray of Ochtertyre (1771–1837), Scottish peer and politician
- Malcolm Patrick Murray (1905–1979), known as Pat or Patrick Murray, British civil servant

== See also ==
- Pat Murray (disambiguation)
