= Robert P. Murray =

American violinist, scholar and teacher (1936–2020)

Robert Pfenning Murray (October 24, 1936 – August 11, 2020) was an American violinist, scholar and teacher. He premiered the 5th Sonata for Violin and Piano by Pulitzer Prize winning composer Leo Sowerby. Murray was the first violinist to record the four sonatas of Anton Rubinstein. More recently, he has partnered with Ardyth Lohuis in a violin and pipe organ duo which brought attention to the large body of musical repertoire available for this combination of instruments through concerts and recordings. Several well known contemporary composers have written pieces for Murray and Lohuis, and have worked closely with Murray and Lohuis to create definitive recordings of these works.

== Personal life ==
Murray was born in South Bend, Indiana, but he grew up in Janesville, Wisconsin and graduated from Janesville High School in 1955. He attended the American Conservatory in Chicago, Illinois where he earned his Bachelor of Music and Master of Music degrees. Murray received a Doctor of Music degree from Indiana University School of Music in Bloomington. He learned electronics while serving as an officer in the United States Navy. This background enabled him to have complete artistic control over his recordings which, because of the organ, are made on location in concert halls and churches, rather than studio environments. Murray, who was born with perfect pitch, determines microphone placement in each venue through meticulous test sessions in each new hall. He uses his own recording equipment, and even does the editing for each composition. Before becoming a university professor, Murray worked as a backup studio musician in Nashville for Eddy Arnold, Chet Atkins, Floyd Cramer and other recording artists.

== Career ==
While a student at the American Conservatory of Music in Chicago, Murray premiered the Sowerby Sonata for Violin and Piano at a convention of the International Society for Contemporary Music. After completing his master's degree, Murray served four years as an officer in the U.S. Navy, after which he resumed his musical career and concertized widely as a soloist. He has been with Columbia Artists as a member of the Nashville String Quartet in Tennessee, has served as concertmaster of numerous orchestras including the Chicago Chamber Orchestra, the Amici della Musica Chamber Orchestra in Santa Clara, California, and the Bach Festival Orchestra in Carmel, California. He made his New York debut at Town Hall in 1975.

Murray's scholastic and professional career has associated him with an impressive array of musicians and teachers, including Scott Willits (first American representative of O. Sevcik), Franco Gulli, Irving Ilmer, William Primrose, Janos Starker, Tadeusz Wronski, Rudolf Kolisch, Daniel Guillet, Allan Blank, Derek Healey, Wilbur Held, Lewis Whikehart and Leo Sowerby. A scholar as well as violinist, Murray has served as Chamber Music Editor for the American String Teachers' Association national journal, and was also a major contributor to that association's book, The Bach Chaconne: A Collection of Views. His Doctoral Dissertation, which is in the Library at Indiana University, follows the development and changes in artistic playing styles based on analysis of various editions of the Bach Chaconne, and is titled, "Evolution of Interpretation As Reflected In Successive Editions of J. S. Bach's 'Chaconne'". Murray has been on the faculty at University of Northern Colorado in Greeley and at Baylor University in Waco, Texas, and it was during this time that he recorded the Saint-Saëns Sonatas which were praised by Fanfare Magazine for having 'greater vigor' and being faster than the recording done by Heifetz. While teaching at Virginia Commonwealth University in Richmond he joined cellist Frantisek Smetana (a relative of Smetana of 'Moldau' Fame), and was the violinist that institution's highly praised "Smetana Trio". After Smetana retired, Murray joined Ardyth Lohuis to form the Murray/Lohuis Duo which performs music for violin and pipe organ, and created a new niche for artists of both instruments. Composers Allan Blank, Derek Healey, Wilber Held and Lew Whikehart have written and dedicated pieces to Murray and Lohuis, thus increasing the already surprisingly ample available repertoire. In addition, John Corigliano gave their violin and organ duo permission to make an organ transcription from the piano score for the "Lento" movement of his Sonata for Violin and Piano, and like the Blank, Healey, Held and Whikehart pieces, this selection is also included on one of their recordings. The Murray/Lohuis Duo has performed at the Piccolo Spoleto Festival, Charleston, South Carolina, at the Margam Festival in Swansea, Wales, and for concert series and conventions in North America too numerous to mention.

Robert Murray's background in electronics enabled him to do all of the recordings on location rather than in a studio setting.

Microphone placement must be decided based on the results of meticulous test sessions for each new facility. Listing the name 'Heinz Pfennig' as the recording engineer, Murray is thus able to maintain complete artistic control over his recordings which because of the pipe organ, are made on location rather than in studio environments. Violinist Murray has performed and recorded for the Musical Heritage Society, Spectrum, a division of Uni-Pro Recordings, Inc., Premier, and Raven. Although the LP recordings from Musical Heritage Society and Uni-Pro division of Spectrum are long out of production, they have been re-released in 2012 as a 4-CD set entitled "Violin Rarities", and offer the listener the opportunity to hear Murray playing two different and beautiful old Italian violins: a 1729 Carlo Bergonzi and a 1700 Giuseppe Guarneri "filius Andrea". The cover features photos of both instruments. Murray CDs produced by Premiere Recordings and others on the Raven label are also still available. Commenting about how the sound of Murray's violin complements the pipe organ, Pipedreams host Michael Barone has said, "The effect is magical." Their Breached Borders CD brought to light excellent music from behind the "Iron Curtain", including the first recording of the Concerto for Violin and Organ by Russian composer Victor Voloshinov. Murray can also be found on "YouTube". YouTube. 11 December 2008.. A sixth CD featuring violin and organ music was released in September, 2010, also on the Raven label. Murray died on August 11, 2020, at the age of 83.

== Works and reviews ==
- Articles:

Richmond Times-Dispatch, February 21, 1996,

H. Wyndham, G. L'EpineH. Wyndham; G. L'Epine. "Who's Who in Music: A biographical record of contemporary musicians".

- Publications:

DZ 1686, "Gavotte en Rondeau BWV 1006", arr. by John Patykula, Violin and 3 guitars, accompaniment by Robert Schumann, violin part edited by Robert Murray. Sheet music published by d'OZ, inc., Canada, 2012

- Musical Heritage Society Recordings:

MHS 3785, C. Saint-Saëns Violin Sonatas, 1977, Robert Murray Violin, Jane Abbott Piano MHS 3385/86. A. Rubinstein, Four Violin Sonatas, Robert Murray Violin, Daniel Graham, Piano

- Spectrum, a Division of UNI-PRO Recordings:

SR-317, Georg Philipp Telemann, 12 Fantasias for Violin Without Bass, Robert Murray, Violin, LP stereo vinyl record, Harriman, New York, 1980. Unknown ID:86-743183

- Premiere Recordings:

Leo Sowerby, Music for Violin and Piano, Robert Murray Violin, Gail Quillman, Piano, CD, 1995, New York

- Arizona University Recordings Contemporary Composer and Performer Series:

AUR CD 3193, "Chamber Works of Allan Blank" with Robert Murray, violin, Ardyth Lohuis, Organ, Sunrise Quartet, David Shaffer-Gottschalk, Piano, Alice Hammel, Flute, Charles West, Clarinet, Bruce Hammel, Bassoon, CD, 2000, Pine Grove Studios, Tucson, Arizona

- Raven Recording CD's:

OAR-200, "A Perfect Match" Violin & Organ works, Robert Murray, Violin, Ardyth Lohuis, Organ. Music of Rheinberger, Stanley, Sowerby, Raff, Weiner, Bender, Ravanello, Vieuxtemps. CD produced by W. Van Pelt, Richmond, Virginia, 1991

OAR-230, "Rondo: Volume II", Works for violin and Organ, 1993, Robert Murray, Violin, Ardyth Lohuis, Organ. Music of Schroeder, Becker, Foote, Bender, Sowerby, Paciorkiewicz, Paganini. CD produced by W. Van Pelt, Richmond, Virginia, 1993

OAR-370, "Breached Borders, Volume III: Works for Violin & Organ", Robert Murray, Violin, Ardyth Lohuis, Organ. Music from behind the Iron Curtain, by Lepnurm, Wilkomirski, Voloshinov, Orlinski, Woytowicz, Komarnitskii. CD produced by W. Van Pelt, Richmond, Virginia, 1996

OAR-510, "Airs & Romances, Volume IV, Works for Violin & Organ", Robert Murray, Violin, Ardyth Lohuis, Organ. Music by Ravanello, Olsson, Becker, Beach, Coleridge-Taylor, Erb, Lindberg, Svendsen, Lovreglio, Jensen. CD produced by W. Van Pelt, Richmond, Virginia, 2000

OAR-650, "All American, Volume V, Works for Violin & Organ", Robert Murray, Violin, Ardyth Lohuis, Organ. Music by Mathews, Bartow, Corigliano, Weaver, Dethier, Healey, Sowerby, Held, Read, Wienhorst, Callahan, Whikehart. CD produced by W. Van Pelt, Richmond, Virginia, 2003

OAR-923, "An International Collection, Volume VI, Works for Violin & Organ", Robert Murray, Violin, Ardyth Lohuis, Organ. Music by O. Respighi, J. Aavik, C. Kint, E. Baghdasaryan, G. Hagg, G. Raphael, D. Healey, W. Held, S. Foster, V. Herbert. CD produced by W. Van Pelt, Richmond, Virginia, 2010

OAR-927, "Violin Rarities", Robert Murray, Violin, Daniel Graham, piano, Jane Abbott-Kirk, piano. Music by Telemann, A. Rubinstein, and C. Saint-Saëns. Digital transfer to CD and mastering by Grace Recording, Hamden, Connecticut, and Airshow, Takoma Park, Maryland, Four CD set produced by W. Van Pelt, Richmond, Virginia.

- Reviews:

New York Times, April 8, 1975, Raymond Ericson, Reviewer

Audio Magazine, December, 1977, E. T. Canby, Reviewer

Fanfare, May/June 1979, J.B., Reviewer

Audio Magazine, August, 1979, E. T. Canby, Reviewer

Richmond Times-Dispatch, Virginia, October 12, 1981, Judith Suben, Reviewer

Reston Times, Reston, Virginia, November 11, 1982

Richmond Times-Dispatch, Virginia, September 12, 1987, James A. Jerritt, Reviewer

Richmond News Leader, June 1, 1991, F. Church, Reviewer

Los Angeles Times, June 20, 1991, J. Henken, reviewer

Cross Accent, Journal of the Association of Lutheran Church Musicians, Number 2, July, 1993

Post and Courier, Charleston, South Carolina, 6/2/94, C. Furtwangler, Reviewer

American Record Guide, July/Aug 1994, page 214, Bond, reviewer

Washington Post, August 15, 1994, C. McCardell

Organ Historical Society, The Diapason, February 1995, R. Dean, Reviewer

The American Organist, October, 1995, P. Hesselink, Reviewer

Richmond Times-Dispatch, February 21, 1996, Section M, pages 1, 3, Marsha Hanzel

The American Organist, August 1996, V. Gotwals, Reviewer

Organ Historical Society, The Diapason, November 1996, D. Bartel

Crossroads, Sun City, Florida, April, 2001, by Charleen Wilson

Organ Historical Society, The Diapason, November, 2002, John L. Speller, Reviewer

American Record Guide 66.6 (November–December 2003): page 227(1), by Metz, Reviewer

"Pipedreams" Radio Broadcast, Michael Barone, Host, Program Number 1040, October 4, 2010
