= Keith Murray (disambiguation) =

Keith Murray (born 1974) is an American rapper.

Keith Murray may also refer to:

- Keith Murray (ceramic artist) (1892–1981), designer of pottery, glass, and metalware
- Keith Murray, Baron Murray of Newhaven (1903–1993), British academic
- Keith Murray (rugby union) (born 1962), Scottish international rugby union player
- Keith Murray (born 1977), American lead vocalist for We Are Scientists
- Keith Murray, English officer of arms, see Portcullis Pursuivant
