= Kate Murray =

Kate Murray may refer to:

- Kate Murray (New York politician)
- Kate Murray (New Hampshire politician)
- Kate Murray (archer)

== See also ==
- Catherine Murray (disambiguation)
- Katie Murray (born 1997), American soccer player
