= Roseana Murray =

Brazilian writer and poet (born 1950)

- Born: December 27, 1950; Rio de Janeiro
- Occupations: Writer, poet
- Spouse: Juan Arias Martínez
- Website: www.roseanamurray.com

Roseana Kligerman Murray (December 27, 1950 – ) is a Brazilian children's poet.

Roseana Murray was born on December 27, 1950 in Rio de Janeiro, the daughter of Lejbus Kligerman and Bertha Gutman Kligerman, Polish immigrants to Brazil. She grew up in the Grajaú neighborhood of Rio de Janeiro. In 1973, she earned a degree in French Literature and Language from Université Nancy.

Since 1980, Murray has written poetry for children. Her work has been praised for its accessibility and inventiveness.

== Personal life ==
Murray is married to Spanish journalist Juan Arias Martínez. On April 5, 2024, Murray was attacked by three pit bulls during her morning walk in Saquarema. She lost her right arm and an ear as a result of the attack, and had reconstructive surgery on her face and left arm. Her release from the hospital coincided with National Children's Book Day (April 18) and was accompanied by the press. She lost the arm she used to write with by hand. She didn't let that discourage her and said she would learn to write with the other hand, just like children.

== Awards ==
- 1986: FNLIJ - Best Poetry
- 1990: FNLIJ - Best Poetry
- 2002: Prize of the Brazilian Academy of Literature (Academia Brasileira de Letras)

== Partial bibliography ==
- Fardo de Carinho (1980)
- Fruta no Ponto (1986)
- Paredes Vazadas (1987)
- Classificados Poéticos (1984)
- Artes e Ofícios (1990)
- Pássaro do Absurdo (1990)
- Criança é Coisa Séria (1991)
- Duas Amigas (1995)
- Felicidade (1995)
- Receitas de Olhar (1997)
- Jardins (2001) with Roger Mello
- Suspiros de Luz (2018)
