= Justice Murray =

Justice Murray may refer to:

- Edward P. Murray (1876–1966), associate justice of the Maine Supreme Judicial Court
- Sir George John Robert Murray (1863–1942), of South Australia
- Hugh Murray (judge) (1825–1857), chief justice of the Supreme Court of California
- James Murray (Maryland judge) (before 1740–1784), associate justice of the Maryland Court of Appeals
- John L. Murray (judge) (1943–2023), chief justice of the Supreme Court of Ireland
- Sir Edward Henry Murray (born 1958), an English High Court judge

== See also ==
- Judge Murray (disambiguation)
