= Joseph Murray (footballer, born 1908) =

English footballer (1908–1988)

Personal information
- Full name: Joseph Murray
- Date of birth: 28 August 1908
- Place of birth: Kingston upon Hull, England
- Date of death: 1988 (aged 79–80)
- Position: Winger

Senior career*
Years	Team	Apps	(Gls)
1924–1925	Dairycoates		
1925–1931	Hull City	17	(1)
1931–1932	Lincoln City	1	(0)
Total		18	(1)
- * Club domestic league appearances and goals

Joseph Murray (28 August 1908 – 1988) was an English footballer who played in the Football League for Hull City and Lincoln City.
