= Alison Murray (author) =

Alison Murray is a Scottish children's author and illustrator, and winner of the Scottish Book Trust's Scottish Children's Book Award. Her books have been reviewed and named as part of top lists. and she is widely held in libraries worldwide.
