= Alison Murray (scientist) =

American biochemist and Antarctic researcher

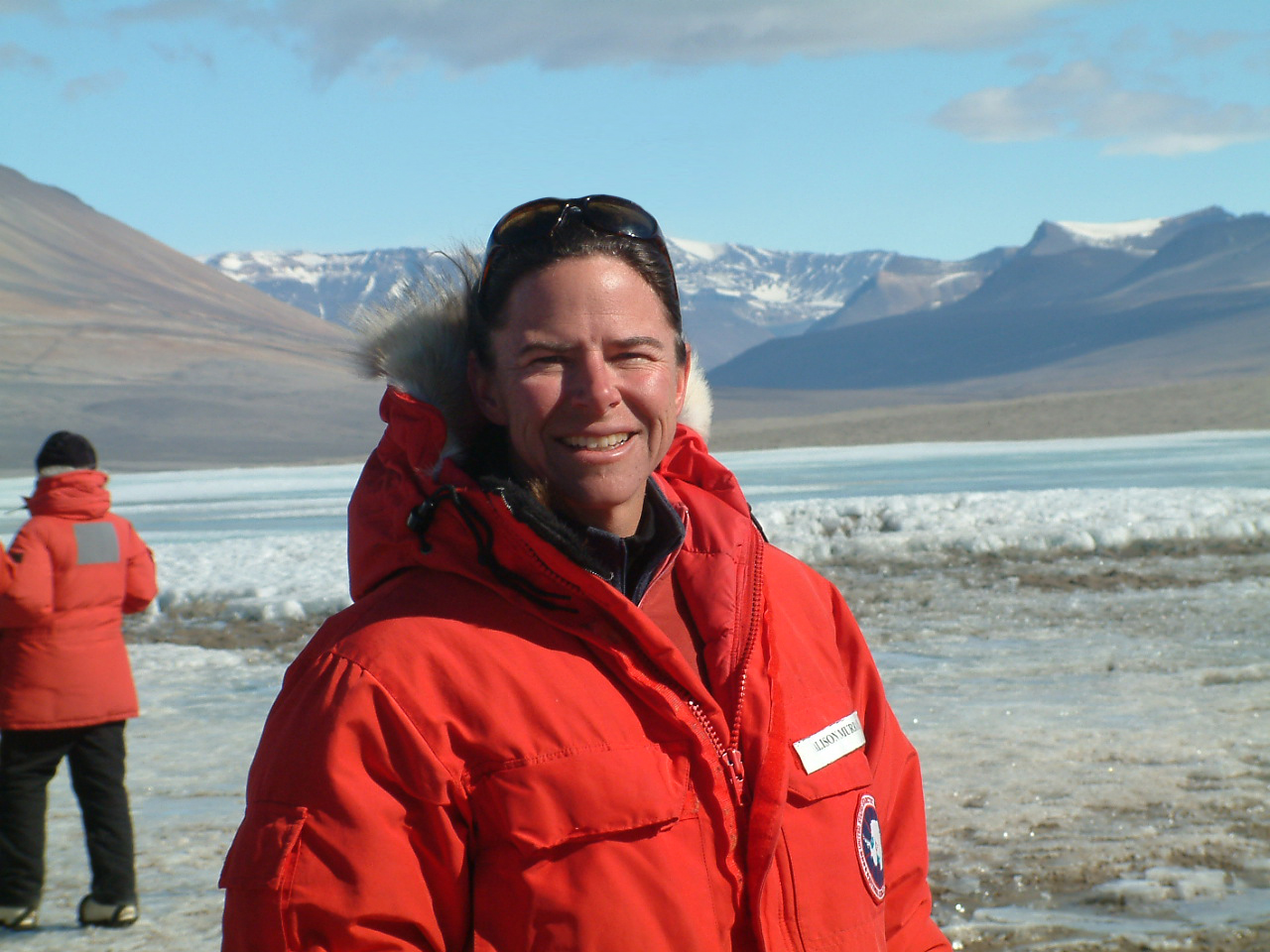
- Alison Murray at Lake Vida
- Born: Alison Elizabeth Murray
- Education: BS California Polytechnic State University; MS San Francisco State University; PhD University of California, Santa Barbara
- Awards: Nevada System of Higher Education Regents Researcher Award (2014)
- Scientific career
- Fields: Microbiology of polar extremophiles Microbial Oceanography
- Workplaces: Desert Research Institute
- Website: www.dri.edu/alison-murray-research

Alison Murray is an American microbial ecologist and Antarctic researcher, best known for studying the diversity, ecology and biogeography of Antarctic marine plankton dynamics of the plankton over the annual cycle; and her work demonstrating the existence of microbial life within an ice-sealed Antarctic lake (Lake Vida). She studies how microorganisms persist and function in extremely cold and harsh environments, including those that lack oxygen and biological sources of energy.

== Early life and education ==
Murray was born and raised in Carmel, California and attended Carmel High School. She received her B.S. in Biochemistry at California Polytechnic State University, San Luis Obispo in 1989, followed by participation in a work-study program that turned into a Research Assistant position at the Bermuda Institute of Ocean Science (formerly, Bermuda Biological Station).

Following two years of work experience she joined the Biogeochemical Reactions in Estuaries - Land Margin Ecosystem Research Program at Tomales Bay, earned her M.S. degree at San Francisco State University in Cell and Molecular Biology in 1994 where she studied with James T. Hollibaugh to develop molecular fingerprinting approaches for marine microorganisms.

Murray's Ph.D. was earned in Ecology, Evolution, and Marine Biology under the mentorship of Edward F. DeLong, from the University of California, Santa Barbara in 1998. It was during this time that she participated in two research expeditions to the Antarctic where she studied the ecology of planktonic marine archaea, Thermoproteota (formerly Crenarchaeota), with circumpolar distributions and demonstrated significant shifts in bacterial community composition and archaeal biomass over the extremes of the high latitude seasonal cycle.

== Career and impact ==
Murray's postdoctoral research (1999-2001) was conducted at the Center for Microbial Ecology at Michigan State University in which she studied in the emerging field of functional genomics with Distinguished Professor James M. Tiedje. She then moved to Desert Research Institute (DRI) in Reno, Nevada, USA in 2001 where she is a research professor.

Murray is best known for studying the diversity, ecology and biogeography of Antarctic marine plankton over the annual cycle. She discovered microbial life at −13 °C existing within an ice-sealed the Antarctic Lake Vida, the largest of several unique lakes found in the McMurdo Dry Valleys. This research finding was profiled by BBC TV, National Public Radio, and in the international news media including The Guardian, Los Angeles Times and Nature.

Murray's research has provided critical insights into how microorganisms persist and function in extremely cold and harsh environments, including those that lack oxygen and biological sources of energy. Making use of molecular genomic tools to describe microbial life, her work has helped answer questions about how microbes function and survive in extremely cold environments and how environmental changes affect the functioning and diversity of these organisms, as well as potential feedbacks that might impact the sustainability of cold-environment ecosystems.

The research has altered the scientific view of biological diversity in high latitude ecosystems where microbes are significantly more diverse than originally surmised and exhibit strong seasonal gradients in community composition; they have been found to exist in places originally thought to be uninhabitable.

Her research has shown how microbes respond to different environmental gradients and how they contribute and control fundamental ecological processes resulting in a better understanding of how high latitude ecosystems function and how they might respond to broad scale perturbations such as climate change (e.g.).

== Awards and honours ==
Murray was recognized in 2019 as the recipient of the DRI Science Medal; she was also awarded the Nevada System of Higher Education Rising Researcher Award in 2009 and the Nevada Regents' Researcher Award in 2013.

== Other activities ==
Murray's leadership activities include serving as Co-lead of NASA's Research Coordination Network for Ocean Worlds, in 2016-2017 she served as co-chair of the Europa Lander Science Definition team, and between 2004 and 2016 she served as Representative to the Life Sciences Standing Committee for the US in the Scientific Committee on Antarctic Research for eleven years and played roles in the Census of Antarctic Marine Life, and continues today in biodiversity data management as part of the AntEco Scientific Research Program steering committee [link: https://www.scar.org/srp/anteco/].

== Selected bibliography ==
- Murray, A. E., Lies D., Li G., Nealson K., Zhou J., and Tiedje J. M. "DNA/DNA Hybridization to Microarrays Reveals Gene-Specific Differences between Closely Related Microbial Genomes."Proceedings of the National Academy of Sciences of the United States of America 98, no. 17 (2001): 9853–858.
- Murray, A.E., Kenig, F. Fritsen, C.H., McKay, C.P., Cawley, K.M., Edwards, R., Kuhn, E., McKnight, D.M., Ostrom, N.E., Peng, V., Ponce, A., Priscu, J.C., Samarkin, V., Townsend, A.T., Wagh, P., Young, S.A., Yung, P.T. and Doran, P.T. Microbial life at −13 °C in the brine of an ice-sealed Antarctic lake Proceedings of the National Academy of Sciences of the United States of America 109 (50) (2012) 20626–20631. doi:10.1073/pnas.1208607109
- Murray, AE, CM Preston, R Massana, LT Taylor, A Blakis, and EF DeLong. Seasonal and spatial variability in coastal Antarctic bacterioplankton assemblages. Applied and Environmental Microbiology. 64(7) (1998) 2585–2595.
- Murray, A.E., Hollibaugh, J.T., Orrego, C. Phylogenetic compositions of bacterioplankton from two California estuaries compared by denaturing gradient gel electrophoresis of 16S rDNA fragments. Applied and Environmental Microbiology 62 (7) (1996) 2676-2680
