= Stephen Murray (historian) =

Professor Emeritus of Art History and Archaeology at Columbia University

Professor Stephen Murray

Academic background
- Education: The Courtauld Institute of Art

Academic work
- Discipline: History of Architecture
- Sub-discipline: Gothic architecture

Stephen D. Murray (born 1945), Professor Emeritus of the Department of Art History and Archaeology at Columbia University, is an architectural historian, specialising in Romanesque and Gothic architecture. Before his retirement, Murray held the Lisa and Bernard Selz chair in Medieval Art History at Columbia University. He has written several important monographs on French Gothic cathedrals, including Troyes, Beauvais, and Amiens. His work combines analysis of architectural details with discussion of medieval writing about cathedrals. He is considered a pioneer in the development of digital media and visual arts resources for educational use.

== Early life and education ==
Murray was born in London. He later moved to Redditch, where he attended Redditch County High School, where his fathrer was headmaster. He was educated as Keble College, Oxford and graduated in 1967. He completed his MA at the Courtauld Institute of Art in 1969, writing on the cathedral at Troyes before earning his Doctor of Philosophy (PhD) in 1972 under Peter Kidson.

According to Murray, his interests in visually documenting Medieval architecture started during his undergraduate years at Oxford, where he was a part of an expedition to film an 11th-century Armenian cathedral. He first visited Amiens Cathedral before he began his teaching career in the United States, following in the footsteps of Englishmen like John Ruskin, whom Murray considers his hero. In an interview, Murray stated that he continues to visit Amiens several times every year. His second book on the cathedral, Notre-Dame of Amiens: Life of the Gothic Cathedral, dedicated to the people of Amiens, was published by Columbia University Press in 2020.

== Career ==
Murray began his teaching career at Morley College, London in 1969. Before joining the Columbia University faculty in 1986, he held numerous posts at Indiana University, eventually appointed as the founding director the university's School of Fine Art. He was also a visiting professor at Harvard University. At Columbia, Murray was the Lisa and Bernard Selz Professor of Medieval Art History. He also served as the director of graduate studies of the Department of Art History and Archaeology between 1989 and 1992. In 1995, Murray founded the Visual Media Center (now the Media Center for Art History (Note: Website of the Media Center for Art History)) and was its executive director until 1999. Murray is now retired from teaching.

=== Projects ===
During the 1990s, Murray developed a segment on Amiens Cathedral for the Art Humanities curriculum at Columbia. Amiens was studied by "virtually every student [...] as a part of their Art Humanities curriculum” at Columbia. When Murray began teaching there, the lack of available visual resources for teaching and studying the Cathedral led him to create the Amiens Cathedral Imaging Project. (Note: Website of the Amiens Cathedral Imaging Project) It was the inaugural project for the Visual Media Center, both of which were supported with a funding from the National Endowment for Humanities (NEH). The multimedia website consisted of computer-generated images and animations, drawings, and photographs of the cathedral. The website also contained recreations of the Medieval composer Pérotin's music, primary documents associated with the cathedral, supplemented by secondary information from Murray's own monograph.

After the success of the Amiens Project, the Media Center launched the History of Architecture website, (Note: History of Architecture website) which built upon Murray's project. The website is a database of visual images, in the format of QuickTime VR panoramas ('nodes') of various buildings from across the world, representing a wide range of architectural styles. The aim of the project was to provide digital resources for teaching architectural history in American schools. The project was funded by the NEH, the Andrew W. Mellon Foundation, the Samuel H. Kress Foundation and the Office of the Provost at Columbia University.

In 2008, Murray and Andrew Tallon led the Mapping Gothic France project, (Note: Website of Mapping Gothic France) funded by a four-year grant from the Andrew W. Mellon Foundation. The website is a database of over 30,000 digital images, covering 200 Gothic cathedrals in France and England. Other features include plans, elevations, history, and bibliography related to each individual buildings. As of 2017, funding for the project had ended and some of the website's content remained incomplete.

=== Awards ===
Throughout his career, Murray has received many honours and awards for his work, including a Guggenheim Fellowship in 1988. Murray's photographs from that time are held in the Courtauld Institute of Arts' Conway Library of art and architecture, and, as of 2017, are being digitised. In 1992, he was appointed by the French Ministry of Culture to the scientific committee overseeing the restoration of Amiens Cathedral.

In January 2020, Murray received an honorary doctorate from the University of Picardy Jules Verne. He is also an honorary citizen of Amiens.

== Expertise and scholarship ==
=== The development of Gothic as a style in Europe ===
Murray argues that Gothic architecture grew out of desires to replicate shapes and images from the natural world (for instance, trees and branches carved in stone), and was a way to look back to admired historic architectural design by the Merovingians, and also looking forwards and creating something new, for instance "the pointed arch as an indexical sign of a break with the past". Murray's work also carefully encourages historians of architecture to consider how Gothic buildings as they are today have gone through "800 years of change", during which time a building may have been experienced in a variety of ways. In his 1996 book about Amiens, Michael T. Davis notes that part of Murray's original approach was to insist that to experience a cathedral, a modern visitor must use their imagination to fully appreciate "the 'joyful spectacle' of human agency" that made the cathedral possible.

=== Relationship between Gothic architecture and writing ===
Murray's most notable contribution to architectural historiography and analysis is the way that he combines analysis of a medieval building with analysis of writing about the building from the time of its creation and initial reception. In doing so, he reveals how internal politicking and financial decisions influence the design of medieval cathedrals as much as religious doctrine. Plotting Gothic, Murray's 2015 book, is "premised upon a compelling analogy: the three-dimensional layout of the space of a great church—its plot—is not only constructed through a geometric schema ... but it is also textually and rhetorically constructed". Murray argues that the experience of cathedral spaces is influenced by writing about that space: for instance, in his 13th-century account of the rebuilding of Canterbury Cathedral after a fire, Gervase of Canterbury used imagery and ideas from the Book of Genesis, with the result being the creation of a "Biblical precedent" for what the building signifies. Murray also discusses how writing by Villard de Honnecourt, "author of a pictorial treatise on Gothic art and architecture", invented the meaning of Gothic, and how Abbot Suger's writing about the abbey church at St Denis influenced the phases of re-building and re-design the site. Writing about a place, Murray suggests, can be seen to affect how the place is used, rebuilt or repaired, perceived, and experienced.

=== Mapping Gothic France ===
Reviewing the 'Mapping Gothic France' website for The Digital Medievalist, Katherine Werwie praised the quality of the photographs and data captured: "The sections of the website presenting individual monuments offer significant collections of photographs that are particularly useful because the locations from which they were taken as well as the direction of each view are clearly marked. Short of visiting these monuments, one would be hard pressed to find a better visualization of the space of these buildings."

== Publications ==
=== Books ===
- Building Troyes Cathedral: The Late Gothic Campaigns (Indiana University Press, 1987); ISBN 0-2533-1277-9
- Beauvais Cathedral: Architecture of Transcendence (Princeton University Press, 1989); ISBN 0-6910-4236-5
- Notre-Dame, Cathedral of Amiens: The Power of Change in Gothic (Cambridge University Press, 1996); ISBN 0-5214-9735-3
- A Gothic Sermon: Making a Contract with the Mother of God, Saint Mary of Amiens (University of California Press, 2004); ISBN 0-5202-3847-8
- Plotting Gothic (University of Chicago Press, 2015); ISBN 0-2261-9180-X
- Notre-Dame of Amiens: Life of the Gothic Cathedral (Columbia University Press, 2021); ISBN 9780231195768

=== Journals ===
A list of Murray's publications in journals can be found through his profile page on the Mapping Gothic website.
