= Andrew Murray (children's writer) =

British writer of children's books (born 1970)

Andrew Ian Murray (born 1 October 1970) is a British writer of children's books.

A native of Bromley, South-East London, he is the creator of the Buddy and Elvis picture books with Nicola Slater. Buddy and Elvis is in television production with London's Illuminated Films and Toronto's Comet Entertainment. Andrew's stories and The Tolkien Quiz Book have been translated into many languages. The Ghost Rescue series was published by Orchard Books in 2009.
