= Philip I. Murray =

Philip I. Murray FRCP, FRCS, FRCOphth

Academic work
- Discipline: Ophthalmology
- Sub-discipline: Uveitis
- Institutions: University of Birmingham
- Website: http://pimurray.com

Philip I. Murray is Professor of Ophthalmology at the University of Birmingham, in England, and Honorary Consultant Ophthalmologist at the Birmingham and Midland Eye Centre.

== Early life ==
Philip I. Murray was born within earshot of Bow-Bells in London's East End, but grew up in West London. He was educated at Latymer Upper School. Murray represented the school at football and grew to be a loyal supporter and Life Member of his local football club, Brentford FC, better known as, "The Bees". He went on to read medicine at St. George's Hospital Medical School in London, graduating in 1978.

== Career ==
Following house officer posts and a senior house officer post in neurosurgery, Murray went on to pursue a career in Ophthalmology. In between clinical posts, he spent two years at the Institute of Ophthalmology in London, under the laboratory and clinical supervision of Amjad Rahi and Bill Dinning respectively, mainly studying T-lymphocyte subsets in uveitis. In 1985 he began clinical ophthalmology training at Moorfield's Eye Hospital in London, where he undertook registrar and senior registrar posts. In 1988 he spent a year on sabbatical as a visiting researcher at the Netherlands Ophthalmic Research Institute (now Netherlands Institute for Neuroscience) in Amsterdam. Under the supervision of Aize Kijlstra, he undertook extensive laboratory research into human and animal models of uveitis and combined this with his work at the Institute toward his PhD; his thesis titled, "Immunological Aspects of Intraocular Inflammation". Murray then returned to London, to complete his training.

He was appointed Senior Lecturer at the University of Birmingham in 1990, then briefly Reader then Professor in 1997.

Murray is an Honorary Consultant Ophthalmologist at the Birmingham and Midland Eye Centre, Sandwell and West Birmingham Hospitals NHS Trust where he holds regional and supraregional referral Uveitis clinics. Murray is Lead for Undergraduate Ophthalmology training at the University of Birmingham, Postgraduate Supervisor for MD, PhD and Academic clinicians and was the Clinical Lead for the Graduate School of the College of Medical and Dental Sciences at the University of Birmingham.

He was honorary secretary of the International Uveitis Study Group, and was the 2013 Duke Elder Lecturer at the Royal College of Ophthalmologists.

== Honours and awards ==
Murray is co-editor of the Oxford Handbook of Ophthalmology. He was involved in establishing Birmingham as one of three National Centres of Excellence for Behçet's disease.
