= 2025–26 Scottish Cup =

Tournament details
- Country: Scotland
- Dates: 9 August 2025 – 23 May 2026
- Teams: 132

Final positions
- Champions: Celtic (43rd title)
- Runners-up: Dunfermline Athletic

Tournament statistics
- Matches played: 132
- Goals scored: 449 (3.4 per match)

The 2025–26 Scottish Cup (known as the Scottish Gas Men's Scottish Cup for sponsorship reasons) was the 141st season of Scotland's most prestigious football knockout competition.

Aberdeen were the defending champions after defeating Celtic in the 2025 final. They were defeated in the quarter-finals by Dunfermline Athletic.

== Calendar ==
The dates for the 2025–26 Scottish Cup were announced on 22 July 2025.

Round	Original date	Number of fixtures	Clubs	New Entries	Leagues entering at this round
Preliminary round one	9 August 2025	4	132 → 128	8	7 qualifiers and 1 licensed club
Preliminary round two	30 August 2025	26	128 → 102	48	48 licensed clubs
First round	27 September 2025	30	102 → 72	34	18 Highland League teams 16 Lowland League teams
Second round	25 October 2025	20	72 → 52	10	10 League Two teams
Third round	29 November 2025	20	52 → 32	20	10 Championship teams 10 League One teams
Fourth round	17 January 2026	16	32 → 16	12	12 Premiership teams
Fifth round	7 February 2026	8	16 → 8	None	
Quarter-finals	7 March 2026	4	8 → 4	None	
Semi-finals	18 & 19 April 2026	2	4 → 2	None	
Final	23 May 2026	1	2 → 1	None	

== Preliminary round one ==
The draw for preliminary round one was made on 23 July 2025. The seven teams without an SFA club licence were required to be included in the first preliminary round draw – namely Culter (North Region Juniors champions), Dundee North End (Midlands League champions), Invergordon (North Caledonian League champions), Johnstone Burgh (Junior Cup winners), Lochar Thistle (South of Scotland League champions), Steins Thistle (Amateur Cup winners) and Whitburn (Cup Winners' Shield winners). They were drawn into four ties alongside one of the 49 licensed clubs. The remaining 48 licensed clubs received a bye to the second preliminary round.

Johnstone Burgh, Lochar Thistle, Steins Thistle and Whitburn are all taking part in the competition for the first time.

=== Matches ===
9 August 2025	Invergordon	3–1	Lochar Thistle	Dingwall
15:00				Stadium: Victoria Park; Referee: Ross Birrell

9 August 2025	Irvine Meadow	1–4	Johnstone Burgh	Irvine
15:00				Stadium: Meadow Park; Referee: Josh Hay

9 August 2025	Whitburn	3–2	Steins Thistle	Whitburn
15:00				Stadium: Central Park; Referee: Abbie Hendry

9 August 2025	Dundee North End	2–2 (a.e.t.) (3–2 p)	Culter	Dundee
15:00				Stadium: North End Park; Referee: Michael McCart

== Preliminary round two ==
The draw for preliminary round two was made on 23 July 2025. St Cadoc's and Tweedmouth Rangers are taking part in the competition for the first time having gained their SFA club licence, along with Bo'ness Athletic who previously competed as a qualifier.

Teams in bold advanced to the first round.

East of Scotland League	West of Scotland League	Others
Premier Division: **Bo'ness Athletic**; **Camelon Juniors**; Dunbar United; **Dundonald Bluebell**; Dunipace; Haddington Athletic; **Hill of Beath Hawthorn**; Hutchison Vale; **Jeanfield Swifts**; **Musselburgh Athletic**; **Newtongrange Star**; Penicuik Athletic; **Sauchie Juniors**; St Andrews United; Whitburn; First Division: Blackburn United; Easthouses Lily Miners Welfare; Edinburgh University; Preston Athletic; Tynecastle; Whitehill Welfare; Second Division: **Burntisland Shipyard**; **Coldstream**; Dalkeith Thistle; Third Division: Hawick Royal Albert; Tweedmouth Rangers; Vale of Leithen	Premier Division: **Auchinleck Talbot**; **Cumnock Juniors**; **Glenafton Athletic**; **Johnstone Burgh**; **Kilwinning Rangers**; **Pollok**; Rutherglen Glencairn; St Cadoc's; First Division: **Benburb**; **Darvel**; Second Division: **Bonnyton Thistle**; **Threave Rovers**; Third Division: Girvan; **Glasgow University**; Fourth Division: **Carluke Rovers**	Midlands League Prem Div: **Dundee North End**; **Lochee United**; **Tayport**; North Caledonian League: Golspie Sutherland; **Invergordon**; South of Scotland League: Creetown; Dalbeattie Star; Newton Stewart; St Cuthbert Wanderers; Wigtown & Bladnoch

=== Matches ===
29 August 2025	St Cadoc's	**0–1**	**Pollok**	Glasgow
19:00				Stadium: New Tinto Park; Referee: Duncan Williams

30 August 2025	Rutherglen Glencairn	**2–4**	**Newtongrange Star**	Rutherglen
14:00				Stadium: The Hamish B Allan Stadium; Referee: Colin Whyte

30 August 2025	Whitburn	**1–2**	**Johnstone Burgh**	Whitburn
14:30				Stadium: Central Park; Referee: Michael McCart

30 August 2025	**Dundee North End**	**1–0**	Whitehill Welfare	Dundee
14:30				Stadium: North End Park; Referee: Kieran O'Reilly

30 August 2025	Tynecastle	**0–3**	**Carluke Rovers**	Edinburgh
14:30				Stadium: Meggetland Sports Complex; Referee: Gary Train

30 August 2025	**Jeanfield Swifts**	**3–1** (a.e.t.)	Preston Athletic	Perth
14:30				Stadium: Riverside Stadium; Referee: Brent Falconer

30 August 2025	**Dundonald Bluebell**	**3–2**	Edinburgh University	Cardenden
14:30				Stadium: Moorside Park; Referee: Ross Birrell

30 August 2025	**Sauchie Juniors**	**2–0**	Hutchison Vale	Sauchie
15:00				Stadium: Beechwood Park; Referee: Thomas Denholm

30 August 2025	Hawick Royal Albert	**1–4**	**Threave Rovers**	Hawick
15:00				Stadium: Albert Park; Referee: Chris McLaughlin

30 August 2025	**Invergordon**	**3–1** (a.e.t.)	Dunipace	Dingwall
15:00				Stadium: Victoria Park; Referee: David Alexander

30 August 2025	**Benburb**	**2–0**	Easthouses Lily Miners Welfare	Glasgow
15:00				Stadium: New Tinto Park; Referee: Luke McCauley

30 August 2025	**Auchinleck Talbot**	**4–0**	Haddington Athletic	Auchinleck
15:00				Stadium: Beechwood Park; Referee: John Fairley Jnr.

30 August 2025	**Glasgow University**	**3–1**	Newton Stewart	Airdrie
15:00				Stadium: Excelsior Stadium; Referee: Konrad Spalony

30 August 2025	**Hill of Beath Hawthorn**	**4–2**	St Andrews United	Hill of Beath
15:00				Stadium: Keir's Park; Referee: Owen Lawrence

30 August 2025	**Tayport**	**4–1**	Dalbeattie Star	Tayport
15:00				Stadium: The Canniepairt; Referee: Vladyslav Melnyk

30 August 2025	**Glenafton Athletic**	**3–0**	Dalkeith Thistle	New Cumnock
15:00				Stadium: Loch Park; Referee: Tayler Martin

30 August 2025	Golspie Sutherland	**0–3**	**Coldstream**	Golspie
15:00				Stadium: King George V Park; Referee: Robert Bowie

30 August 2025	Vale of Leithen	**1–6**	**Musselburgh Athletic**	Innerleithen
15:00				Stadium: Victoria Park; Referee: Mark Daly

30 August 2025	Blackburn United	**1–3**	**Darvel**	Blackburn
15:00				Stadium: New Murrayfield Park; Referee: Regan Wallace

30 August 2025	Dunbar United	**2–4**	**Cumnock Juniors**	Dunbar
15:00				Stadium: New Countess Park; Referee: Ewan Dunn

30 August 2025	Penicuik Athletic	**2–4** **(void) (Note: Kilwinning Rangers made a sixth substitution breaching Scottish Cup rules in their second preliminary round match away to Penicuik Athletic and the match was ordered to be replayed. The match had originally finished 4–2 to Kilwinning Rangers.)**	Kilwinning Rangers	Penicuik
15:00				Stadium: Montgomery Park; Referee: Jordan Curran

30 August 2025	**Bonnyton Thistle**	**2–1** (a.e.t.)	Girvan	Kilmarnock
15:00				Stadium: The Synergy Arena; Referee: Blair McAlpine

30 August 2025	St Cuthbert Wanderers	**0–2**	**Burntisland Shipyard**	Kirkcudbright
15:00				Stadium: St Mary's Park; Referee: Ross Donaldson

30 August 2025	Tweedmouth Rangers	**1–3**	**Lochee United**	Berwick-upon-Tweed, England
15:00				Stadium: Shielfield Park; Referee: Euan Birch

30 August 2025	**Bo'ness Athletic**	**7–0**	Creetown	Bo'ness
19:45				Stadium: Newtown Park; Referee: Yaser Razouk

6 September 2025	Wigtown & Bladnoch	**0–10**	**Camelon Juniors**	Wigtown
15:00				Stadium: Trammondford Park; Referee: Jack Leslie

=== Replay ===
17 September 2025	Penicuik Athletic	**1–3**	**Kilwinning Rangers**	Penicuik
19:45				Stadium: Montgomery Park; Referee: Daniel Graves

== First round ==
The draw for the first round was made on 31 August 2025 at 6pm live on the Scottish Cup YouTube channel.

Teams in bold advanced to the second round.

Highland League	Lowland League	East of Scotland League	West of Scotland League	Others
**Banks O' Dee**; **Brechin City**; Brora Rangers; **Buckie Thistle**; **Clachnacuddin**; **Deveronvale**; **Formartine United**; Forres Mechanics; **Fraserburgh**; Huntly; Inverurie Loco Works; Keith; Lossiemouth; **Nairn County**; Rothes; Strathspey Thistle; **Turriff United**; **Wick Academy**	Albion Rovers; Berwick Rangers; Bo'ness United; **Bonnyrigg Rose**; Broxburn Athletic; **Caledonian Braves**; Civil Service Strollers; **Clydebank**; Cowdenbeath; **Cumbernauld Colts**; **East Stirlingshire**; Gala Fairydean Rovers; **Gretna 2008**; **Linlithgow Rose**; **Tranent**; **University of Stirling**	Premier Division: **Bo'ness Athletic**; **Camelon Juniors**; **Dundonald Bluebell**; Hill of Beath Hawthorn; Jeanfield Swifts; **Musselburgh Athletic**; Newtongrange Star; **Sauchie Juniors**; Second Division: Burntisland Shipyard; Coldstream	Premier Division: **Auchinleck Talbot**; Cumnock Juniors; **Glenafton Athletic**; **Johnstone Burgh**; Kilwinning Rangers; Pollok; First Division: **Benburb**; Darvel; Second Division: Bonnyton Thistle; Threave Rovers; Third Division: Glasgow University; Fourth Division: Carluke Rovers	Midlands League Prem Div: **Dundee North End**; Lochee United; **Tayport**; North Caledonian League: Invergordon

=== Matches ===
26 September 2025	**Auchinleck Talbot**	**2–1**	Cumnock Juniors	Auchinleck
19:45	Boyd 69'; Thomson 90' (pen.)		Roulston 9'	Stadium: Beechwood Park; Referee: Lewis Hogarth

26 September 2025	**Cumbernauld Colts**	**4–0**	Glasgow University	Cumbernauld
19:45	Jack 5', 19'; Farquhar 54'; McGuigan 90'			Stadium: Broadwood Stadium; Referee: Abbie Hendry

27 September 2025	Bo'ness United	**0–3**	**Banks O' Dee**	Bo'ness
14:00			Duell 28'; Winton 54'; MacLeod 90'	Stadium: Newtown Park; Referee: Michael McCart

27 September 2025	**Johnstone Burgh**	**4–0**	Threave Rovers	Johnstone
14:30	Gilmartin 6'; McShane 76'; Kerr 83'; Esplin 89'			Stadium: James Y. Keanie Park; Referee: Blair McAlpine

27 September 2025	**Turriff United**	**2–1**	Hill of Beath Hawthorn	Turriff
15:00	Keir 4'; McLean 14'		Watt 77'	Stadium: The Haughs; Referee: Alex Ross

27 September 2025	Cowdenbeath	**1–2**	**Benburb**	Cowdenbeath
15:00	Downie 30'		Lithgow 70'; McWilliams 75'	Stadium: Central Park; Referee: Scott Donohoe

27 September 2025	Huntly	**1–3**	**Buckie Thistle**	Huntly
15:00	Morris 29'		Allen 51', 68'; Goodall 59'	Stadium: Christie Park; Referee: Robert Bowie

27 September 2025	**Tranent**	**3–0**	Pollok	Tranent
15:00	Watson 11' (pen.); Girdwood 45'; McIntyre 72'			Stadium: Foresters Park; Referee: Euan Birch

27 September 2025	Newtongrange Star	**1–3**	**East Stirlingshire**	Newtongrange
15:00	Bentley 86'		Hislop 44', 54'; McRoberts 56'	Stadium: New Victoria Park; Referee: Will Adam

27 September 2025	Jeanfield Swifts	**0–4**	**Clydebank**	Perth
15:00			McLaughlin 37'; Low 48'; Samson 67', 76'	Stadium: Riverside Stadium; Referee: Owen Lawrence

27 September 2025	Forres Mechanics	**0–2**	**Caledonian Braves**	Forres
15:00			McNeil 88' (pen.); Breadner 90'	Stadium: Mosset Park; Referee: Ross Birrell

27 September 2025	Civil Service Strollers	**2–3** (a.e.t.)	**Dundonald Bluebell**	Edinburgh
15:00	73' (pen.); 90'		Wilson 42', 106'; McLeod-Kay 75'	Stadium: Christie Gillies Park; Referee: Gary Train

27 September 2025	Brora Rangers	**0–1**	**Fraserburgh**	Brora
15:00			Watt 4'	Stadium: Dudgeon Park; Referee: Mark Daly

27 September 2025	Inverurie Loco Works	**0–2**	**Sauchie Juniors**	Inverurie
15:00			McGowan 55'; Cairns 70'	Stadium: Harlaw Park; Referee: Conor Greenan

27 September 2025	Strathspey Thistle	**1–2** (a.e.t.)	**Dundee North End**	Grantown-on-Spey
15:00	Shewan 29' (pen.)		Linn 55'; Cruickshanks 118'	Stadium: Seafield Park; Referee: Chris McLaughlin

27 September 2025	**Clachnacuddin**	**2–1**	Kilwinning Rangers	Inverness
15:00	Anderson 77'; Cooper 81'		MacIntosh 68'	Stadium: Grant Street Park; Referee: Yaser Razouk

27 September 2025	Lochee United	**1–3**	**Brechin City**	Dundee
15:00	Lunan 84'		Spark 21'; Taylor 31', 58'	Stadium: Thomson Park; Referee: Thomas Denholm

27 September 2025	**Linlithgow Rose**	**2–1**	Gala Fairydean Rovers	Linlithgow
15:00	Hamilton 22'; Henderson 58' (pen.)		Dolan 55'	Stadium: Prestonfield; Referee: David Alexander

27 September 2025	**Musselburgh Athletic**	**2–0**	Bonnyton Thistle	Musselburgh
15:00	Barker 67'; Smith 74'			Stadium: Olivebank Arena; Referee: Vladyslav Melnyk

27 September 2025	**Camelon Juniors**	**2–1**	Albion Rovers	Camelon
15:00	Taylor 14'; Kirkpatrick 80'		Garth 26'	Stadium: Carmuirs Park; Referee: Ewan Dunn

27 September 2025	Coldstream	**2–3**	**Tayport**	Coldstream
15:00	Boyd 44'; Brian 90'		Samson 13', 45'; Gill 85'	Stadium: Home Park; Referee: Lewis Barnie

27 September 2025	Lossiemouth	**1–2**	**Formartine United**	Lossiemouth
15:00	Harvey 60'		McLean 39'; McAllister 76'	Stadium: Grant Park; Referee: Ross Donaldson

27 September 2025	**Bonnyrigg Rose**	**2–1**	Broxburn Athletic	Rosewell
15:00	Martyniuk 41'; Ross 80'		Douglas 82'	Stadium: Ferguson Park; Referee: Nathan Crawford

27 September 2025	**Wick Academy**	**5–0**	Rothes	Wick
15:00	Allan 15', 44'; Kennedy 38'; MacGregor 42', 60'			Stadium: Harmsworth Park; Referee: Kieran O'Reilly

27 September 2025	Berwick Rangers	**0–2**	**Nairn County**	Berwick-upon-Tweed, England
15:00			Dingwall 29'; Barron 78'	Stadium: Shielfield Park; Referee: Calum Foreman

27 September 2025	**Glenafton Athletic**	**3–2**	Invergordon	New Cumnock
15:00	Maley 9'; Lindsay 12'; Mullen 44'		Ross 53'; Lambie 90'	Stadium: Loch Park; Referee: Jack Leslie

27 September 2025	Darvel	**1–3**	**Deveronvale**	Darvel
15:00	MacDonald 56'		Yunus 9'; Matheson 28'; Smith 77'	Stadium: Recreation Park; Referee: Tayler Martin

27 September 2025	Carluke Rovers	**0–4**	**Gretna 2008**	Carluke
15:00			Douglas 57'; Atkinson 70', 75', 89'	Stadium: John Cumming Stadium; Referee: Steven McLelland

27 September 2025	**Bo'ness Athletic**	**2–1**	Keith	Bo'ness
19:00	Weir 7', 23'		Ormsby 49'	Stadium: Newtown Park; Referee: Stewart Luke

29 September 2025	**University of Stirling**	**6–2**	Burntisland Shipyard	Stirling
19:45	Moffett 4', 75'; Vonk 21'; Tallen 83', 87'; Martin 90'		Marr 23'; Hunter 43'	Stadium: Forthbank Stadium; Referee: Konrad Spalony

== Second round ==
The draw for the second round was made on 28 September 2025 at 5pm live on the Scottish Cup YouTube channel.

Teams in italics were not known at the time of the draw.

Teams in bold advanced to the third round.

League Two	Highland League	Lowland League	East of Scotland League	West of Scotland League	Others
**Annan Athletic**; Clyde; **Dumbarton**; East Kilbride; **Edinburgh City**; **Elgin City**; **Forfar Athletic**; **Stirling Albion**; **Stranraer**; **The Spartans**	**Banks O' Dee**; **Brechin City**; **Buckie Thistle**; **Clachnacuddin**; Deveronvale; Formartine United; Fraserburgh; Nairn County; **Turriff United**; Wick Academy	**Bonnyrigg Rose**; Caledonian Braves; **Clydebank**; Cumbernauld Colts; East Stirlingshire; Gretna 2008; **Linlithgow Rose**; **Tranent**; University of Stirling	Premier Division: Bo'ness Athletic; **Camelon Juniors**; Dundonald Bluebell; Musselburgh Athletic; Sauchie Juniors	Premier Division: **Auchinleck Talbot**; Glenafton Athletic; Johnstone Burgh; First Division: **Benburb**	Midlands League Prem Div: Dundee North End; Tayport

=== Matches ===
24 October 2025	Bo'ness Athletic	**0–2**	**Linlithgow Rose**	Bo'ness
19:30			Stenhouse 3'; Hamilton 9'	Stadium: Newtown Park; Attendance: 625; Referee: Yaser Razouk

24 October 2025	Formartine United	**0–2**	**Buckie Thistle**	Pitmedden
19:45			Peters 36'; Cummings 53'	Stadium: North Lodge Park; Attendance: 300; Referee: Josh Hay

25 October 2025	**Clydebank**	**3–1**	East Stirlingshire	Clydebank
15:00	Grant 31'; Samson 68'; Hickey-Fugaccia 90'		McCafferty 8'	Stadium: Holm Park; Attendance: 918; Referee: Michael McCart

25 October 2025	**Camelon Juniors**	**1–0**	Johnstone Burgh	Camelon
15:00	Taylor 76'			Stadium: Carmuirs Park; Attendance: 698; Referee: Nathan Crawford

25 October 2025	**Tranent**	**3–0**	Dundee North End	Tranent
15:00	Watson 45' (pen.), 84' (pen.); McKinley 49'			Stadium: Foresters Park; Attendance: 260; Referee: Brent Falconer

25 October 2025	**Banks O' Dee**	**4–0**	Fraserburgh	Aberdeen
15:00	Watson 8'; Gilmour 23', 45'; Pugh 44'			Stadium: Spain Park; Attendance: 230; Referee: Robert Bowie

25 October 2025	**Clachnacuddin**	**2–0**	Sauchie Juniors	Inverness
15:00	Anderson 67', 76'			Stadium: Grant Street Park; Attendance: 309; Referee: Euan Birch

25 October 2025	Clyde	**2–3**	**Annan Athletic**	Hamilton
15:00	Sutherland 54'; Connell 66'		Gibson 16', 90'; A.Smith 21'	Stadium: New Douglas Park; Attendance: 487; Referee: Lewis Hogarth

25 October 2025	**Edinburgh City**	**1–0**	University of Stirling	Edinburgh
15:00	Lawson 37'			Stadium: Meadowbank Stadium; Attendance: 160; Referee: Joel Kennedy

25 October 2025	Caledonian Braves	**3–4** (a.e.t.)	**Stirling Albion**	Motherwell
15:00	McNeil 27'; McLaren 90'; L.Walker 90'		R.Stewart 34' (o.g.); Eadie 48'; McLean 68' (pen.); Brown 108'	Stadium: Alliance Park; Attendance: 268; Referee: Abbie Hendry

25 October 2025	**Stranraer**	**4–0**	Glenafton Athletic	Stranraer
15:00	Dolan 21'; Currie 33' (o.g.); Hunter 77'; Edgar 90'			Stadium: Stair Park; Attendance: 506; Referee: Ross Birrell

25 October 2025	Musselburgh Athletic	**1–2**	**Forfar Athletic**	Musselburgh
15:00	Todd 43'		Morrison 46'; Slater 87'	Stadium: Olivebank Arena; Attendance: 700; Referee: Cameron Stirling

25 October 2025	**Elgin City**	**2–1**	Deveronvale	Elgin
15:00	Murray 62'; Sargent 90'		Angus 85'	Stadium: Borough Briggs; Attendance: 704; Referee: Greg Soutar

25 October 2025	**Dumbarton**	**2–0**	Tayport	Dumbarton
15:00	Neill 37'; Walker 51'			Stadium: Dumbarton Football Stadium; Attendance: 540; Referee: Scott Donohoe

25 October 2025	**The Spartans**	**2–1**	East Kilbride	Edinburgh
15:00	McNulty 60', 62'		Robertson 20' (pen.)	Stadium: Ainslie Park; Attendance: 401; Referee: Jamie Wilkie

25 October 2025	Nairn County	**1–2**	**Turriff United**	Nairn
15:00	Barron 63' (pen.)		Keir 21' (pen.); Kinsella 45'	Stadium: Station Park; Attendance: 452; Referee: Thomas Denholm

25 October 2025	Wick Academy	**1–1** (a.e.t.) (**7–8** p)	**Benburb**	Wick
15:00	MacGregor 103'		Taggart 98'	Stadium: Harmsworth Park; Attendance: 355; Referee: Lewis Barnie
	**Penalties**
	MacGregor (penalty scored); McNab (penalty scored); Campbell (penalty scored); Allan (penalty scored); Sinclair (penalty scored); Robertson (penalty scored); Boyd (penalty scored); MacAdie (penalty missed)		McWilliams (penalty scored); McColl (penalty scored); Collins (penalty scored); Waddell (penalty scored); Black (penalty scored); Clark (penalty scored); Lithgow (penalty scored); Giovanazzi (penalty scored)

25 October 2025	Cumbernauld Colts	**0–2**	**Bonnyrigg Rose**	Cumbernauld
15:00			McGarva 6'; Allison 59' (o.g.)	Stadium: Broadwood Stadium; Attendance: 255; Referee: David Alexander

25 October 2025	**Auchinleck Talbot**	**3–1**	Gretna 2008	Auchinleck
15:00	McAvoy 10'; Schoneville 27'; Gillies 59'		Oram 68'	Stadium: Beechwood Park; Attendance: 602; Referee: Ross Donaldson

25 October 2025	**Brechin City**	**3–1**	Dundonald Bluebell	Brechin
15:00	MacLeod 52'; Findlay 59'; McGrath 76'		McKenzie 78'	Stadium: Glebe Park; Attendance: 443; Referee: Mark Daly

== Third round ==
The draw for the third round was made on 26 October 2025 at 6pm live on the Scottish Cup YouTube channel.

Teams in bold advanced to the fourth round.

Championship	League One	League Two	Tier 5	Tier 6	Tier 7
**Airdrieonians**; **Arbroath**; **Ayr United**; **Dunfermline Athletic**; **Greenock Morton**; **Partick Thistle**; **Queen's Park**; **Raith Rovers**; **Ross County**; St Johnstone	Alloa Athletic; **Cove Rangers**; East Fife; Hamilton Academical; **Inverness Caledonian Thistle**; **Kelty Hearts**; **Montrose**; Peterhead; Queen of the South; **Stenhousemuir**	**Annan Athletic**; Dumbarton; Edinburgh City; **Elgin City**; Forfar Athletic; Stirling Albion; **Stranraer**; **The Spartans**	Highland League: Banks O' Dee; Brechin City; Buckie Thistle; Clachnacuddin; Turriff United; Lowland League: Bonnyrigg Rose; Clydebank; Linlithgow Rose; Tranent	East of Scotland League Premier Division: **Camelon Juniors**; West of Scotland League Premier Division: **Auchinleck Talbot**	West of Scotland League First Division: Benburb

=== Matches ===
28 November 2025	Linlithgow Rose	**1–3**	**Queen's Park**	Linlithgow
19:45	McMullan 15'		Murray 26'; Savoury 57'; Fowler 68'	Stadium: Prestonfield; Attendance: 1,183; Referee: Ryan Lee

29 November 2025	**Airdrieonians**	**4–0**	Hamilton Academical	Airdrie
15:00	McGrattan 47', 72'; Mochrie 55'; Henderson 58' (pen.)			Stadium: Excelsior Stadium; Attendance: 345; Referee: Duncan Nicolson

29 November 2025	**Stranraer**	**2–1** (a.e.t.)	Clydebank	Stranraer
15:00	Syme 32' (o.g.); Edgar 91'		Preston 48'	Stadium: Stair Park; Attendance: 671; Referee: Alastair Grieve

29 November 2025	Benburb	**0–3**	**Montrose**	Glasgow
15:00			Loudon 3'; Quinn 5'; Lyons 50'	Stadium: New Tinto Park; Attendance: 391; Referee: Josh Hay

29 November 2025	**Raith Rovers**	**1–0**	Alloa Athletic	Kirkcaldy
15:00	Doherty 29'			Stadium: Stark's Park; Attendance: 1,405; Referee: Ross Hardie

29 November 2025	Dumbarton	**0–4**	**Auchinleck Talbot**	Dumbarton
15:00			Boyd 45', 62'; McAvoy 71', 75'	Stadium: Dumbarton Football Stadium; Attendance: 1,052; Referee: Sean Murdoch

29 November 2025	**Camelon Juniors**	**2–1**	Edinburgh City	Camelon
15:00	Kavanagh 48'; Watson 90'		McArthur 81'	Stadium: Carmuirs Park; Attendance: 775; Referee: Peter Stuart

29 November 2025	Forfar Athletic	**0–2**	**Partick Thistle**	Forfar
15:00			Stanway 20'; Samuel 90'	Stadium: Station Park; Attendance: 1,394; Referee: Iain Snedden

29 November 2025	Bonnyrigg Rose	**1–2**	**The Spartans**	Bonnyrigg
15:00	Martyniuk 22' (pen.)		K.Watson 10'; Stowe 12'	Stadium: New Dundas Park; Attendance: 840; Referee: Joel Kennedy

29 November 2025	**Stenhousemuir**	**4–1**	Clachnacuddin	Stenhousemuir
15:00	Anderson 5'; Taylor 11'; Gray 21', 42'		Nicolson 77'	Stadium: Ochilview Park; Attendance: 348; Referee: Greg Soutar

29 November 2025	**Kelty Hearts**	**2–0**	Brechin City	Kelty
15:00	Murray 16'; Ferguson 65'			Stadium: New Central Park; Attendance: 365; Referee: Lewis Hogarth

29 November 2025	Banks O' Dee	**0–2**	**Ross County**	Aberdeen
15:00			Hale 19'; White 81'	Stadium: Spain Park; Attendance: 550; Referee: Grant Irvine

29 November 2025	**Elgin City**	**4–2** (a.e.t.)	Stirling Albion	Elgin
15:00	Colloty 45'; Murray 90', 105'; Hester 94'		Cunningham 51'; McLean 56'	Stadium: Borough Briggs; Attendance: 712; Referee: George Calder

29 November 2025	St Johnstone	**1–2** (a.e.t.)	**Cove Rangers**	Perth
15:00	Ikpeazu 24'		Megginson 73'; Emslie 100'	Stadium: McDiarmid Park; Attendance: 2,024; Referee: Chris Graham

29 November 2025	**Dunfermline Athletic**	**2–1**	Queen of the South	Dunfermline
15:00	Kane 7', 15'		J.Tod 4' (o.g.)	Stadium: East End Park; Attendance: 2,127; Referee: Dan McFarlane

29 November 2025	East Fife	**0–2**	**Arbroath**	Methil
15:00			Marshall 10'; Reilly 44'	Stadium: Bayview Stadium; Attendance: 1,025; Referee: Graham Grainger

29 November 2025	**Ayr United**	**3–0**	Turriff United	Ayr
15:00	Main 27'; Watret 29'; Thomas 87'			Stadium: Somerset Park; Attendance: 1,147; Referee: Lloyd Wilson

29 November 2025	**Annan Athletic**	**4–0**	Buckie Thistle	Annan
15:00	T. Muir 6', 48'; Maxwell 57'; Gaffney 61'			Stadium: Galabank; Attendance: 345; Referee: Jamie Wilkie

29 November 2025	Peterhead	**2–2** (a.e.t.) (**3–5** p)	**Greenock Morton**	Peterhead
15:00	McGinn 41'; Shanks 90'		Adeloye 48', 60' (pen.)	Stadium: Balmoor Stadium; Attendance: 609; Referee: Calum Scott
	**Penalties**
	McCarthy (penalty scored); McGuffie (penalty scored); Jason Brown (penalty missed); Shanks (penalty scored)		Shaw (penalty scored); Moore (penalty scored); MacPherson (penalty scored); Longridge (penalty scored); Ballantyne (penalty scored)

10 December 2025 (Note: Originally scheduled to take place at Foresters Park, Tranent on 29 November, the match was twice postponed due to waterlogged pitch and instead moved to Millfield Park, Haddington.)	Tranent	**1–2**	**Inverness Caledonian Thistle**	Haddington
19:45	Jones 25'		Robertson 17'; Zimba 35'	Stadium: Millfield Park; Attendance: 1,007; Referee: Colin Steven

== Fourth round ==
The draw for the fourth round was made on 30 November 2025 during Sportscene on BBC Scotland.

Teams in italics were not known at the time of the draw.

Teams in bold advanced to the fifth round.

Premiership	Championship	League One	League Two	East of Scotland Football League	West of Scotland Football League
**Aberdeen**; **Celtic**; **Dundee**; **Dundee United**; **Falkirk**; Heart of Midlothian; Hibernian; Kilmarnock; Livingston; **Motherwell**; **Rangers**; **St Mirren**	**Airdrieonians**; Arbroath; Ayr United; **Dunfermline Athletic**; Greenock Morton; **Partick Thistle**; **Queen's Park**; Raith Rovers; Ross County	Cove Rangers; Inverness Caledonian Thistle; **Kelty Hearts**; Montrose; **Stenhousemuir**	Annan Athletic; **Elgin City**; Stranraer; **The Spartans**	Camelon Juniors	Auchinleck Talbot

=== Matches ===
16 January 2026	**Rangers**	**5–0**	Annan Athletic	Glasgow
19:45	Miovski 12', 32', 74' (pen.); Dowell 48'; Aasgaard 87'			Stadium: Ibrox Stadium; Attendance: 37,528; Referee: Duncan Nicolson

17 January 2026	**Dunfermline Athletic**	**1–0**	Hibernian	Dunfermline
12:30	Chaiwa 90+2' (o.g.)			Stadium: East End Park; Attendance: 10,350; Referee: Steven McLean

17 January 2026	Kilmarnock	**1–2**	**Dundee**	Kilmarnock
15:00	Thompson 11'		Hay 69'; Wright 90'	Stadium: Rugby Park; Attendance: 4,501; Referee: Colin Steven

17 January 2026	**Airdrieonians**	**3–3** (a.e.t.) (**4–2** p)	Arbroath	Airdrie
15:00	Henderson 12', 57' (pen.); McMaster 98'		Reilly 51'; Beadling 84'; Stewart 109'	Stadium: Excelsior Stadium; Attendance: 1,004; Referee: Calum Scott
	**Penalties**
	Henderson (penalty scored); Barjonas (penalty scored); Hastie (penalty missed); McGrattan (penalty scored); McMaster (penalty scored)		Callaghan (penalty missed); Todorov (penalty scored); Wilkie (penalty scored); Watson (penalty missed)

17 January 2026	**Kelty Hearts**	**1–1** (a.e.t.) (**5–3** p)	Cove Rangers	Kelty
15:00	J.Eguaibor 62' (o.g.)		Megginson 42'	Stadium: New Central Park; Attendance: 393; Referee: Dan McFarlane
	**Penalties**
	Moore (penalty scored); Pettifer (penalty scored); Arnott (penalty scored); Graham (penalty scored); Fisher (penalty scored)		Megginson (penalty scored); Yule (penalty scored); D.Eguaibor (penalty missed); Emslie (penalty scored)

17 January 2026	Camelon Juniors	**1–3**	**Elgin City**	Camelon
15:00	Kirkpatrick 44'		Hester 13', 58'; Williamson 77' (o.g.)	Stadium: Carmuirs Park; Attendance: 1,190; Referee: Sean Murdoch

17 January 2026	**The Spartans**	**0–0** (a.e.t.) (**4–2** p)	Inverness Caledonian Thistle	Edinburgh
15:00				Stadium: Ainslie Park; Attendance: 858; Referee: Iain Snedden
	**Penalties**
	Craigen (penalty scored); Russell (penalty scored); Dishington (penalty scored); Scott (penalty missed); Nair (penalty scored)		Wotherspoon (penalty missed); Zimba (penalty missed); Longstaff (penalty scored); Millen (penalty scored)

17 January 2026	**Stenhousemuir**	**4–0**	Greenock Morton	Stenhousemuir
15:00	N.Jamieson 39'; Aitken 45', 80'; Buchanan 65'			Stadium: Ochilview Park; Attendance: 838; Referee: Euan Anderson

17 January 2026	**Partick Thistle**	**3–1**	Montrose	Glasgow
15:00	Watt 10', 48'; Diack 90'		North 85'	Stadium: Firhill Stadium; Attendance: 2,564; Referee: Lloyd Wilson

17 January 2026	Livingston	**1–1** (a.e.t.) (**3–4** p)	**St Mirren**	Livingston
15:00	Arfield 11'		Idowu 4'	Stadium: Almondvale Stadium; Attendance: 1,834; Referee: Matthew MacDermid
	**Penalties**
	Bokila (penalty missed); McGowan (penalty scored); Susoho (penalty scored); Yengi (penalty missed); May (penalty scored)		Mooney (penalty scored); Fraser (penalty scored); Donnelly (penalty scored); King (penalty missed); Dijksteel (penalty scored)

17 January 2026	**Dundee United**	**2–0**	Ayr United	Dundee
15:00	Möller 77'; Camará 89'			Stadium: Tannadice Park; Attendance: 4,373; Referee: Ryan Lee

17 January 2026	**Motherwell**	**1–0**	Ross County	Motherwell
15:00	Maswanhise 62'			Stadium: Fir Park; Attendance: 5,547; Referee: Don Robertson

17 January 2026	Heart of Midlothian	**1–1** (a.e.t.) (**4–5** p)	**Falkirk**	Edinburgh
20:00	Shankland 86' (pen.)		Parkinson 59'	Stadium: Tynecastle Park; Attendance: 17,109; Referee: Nick Walsh
	**Penalties**
	Spittal (penalty scored); Kyziridis (penalty scored); Kaboré (penalty scored); Kabangu (penalty missed); Milne (penalty scored)		Spencer (penalty scored); Henderson (penalty scored); Graham (penalty scored); Tait (penalty scored); Parkinson (penalty scored)

18 January 2026	**Aberdeen**	**1–0**	Raith Rovers	Aberdeen
14:30	Milne 9'			Stadium: Pittodrie Stadium; Attendance: 9,525; Referee: Kevin Clancy

18 January 2026	Auchinleck Talbot	**0–2**	**Celtic**	Kilmarnock (Note: Originally scheduled to take place at Beechwood Park, Auchinleck, the Auchinleck Talbot v Celtic match was moved to Rugby Park, Kilmarnock due to concerns with the ability of the surrounding infrastructure to cope with the event.)
17:30			Kenny 34'; Tounekti 87'	Stadium: Rugby Park; Attendance: 10,723; Referee: Ross Hardie

20 January 2026	Stranraer	**X** **(void) (Note: Stranraer fielded an ineligible player in their fourth round match against Queen's Park and were eliminated from the competition by the Scottish FA, with Queen's Park being declared the winners via walkover. The match had originally finished 1–1 after extra time with Stranraer winning 6–5 on penalties.)**	**Queen's Park**	Stranraer
19:45	Plank 61'		Connolly 11'	Stadium: Stair Park; Attendance: 597; Referee: Peter Stuart
	**Penalties**
	Russell (penalty scored); Quigg (penalty scored); Plank (penalty scored); Reid (penalty scored); Cleland (penalty scored); Hunter (penalty scored)		(penalty scored) McLeish; (penalty scored) McDonnell; (penalty scored) Connolly; (penalty scored) Longridge; (penalty scored) Fowler; (penalty missed) Pignatiello

== Fifth round ==
The draw for the fifth round was made on 18 January 2026 following the Auchinleck Talbot v Celtic match live on Premier Sports 1 & the Premier Sports YouTube channel.

Teams in italics were not known at the time of the draw.

Teams in bold advanced to the quarter-finals.

Premiership	Championship	League One	League Two
**Aberdeen**; **Celtic**; Dundee; **Dundee United**; **Falkirk**; Motherwell; **Rangers**; **St Mirren**	Airdrieonians; **Dunfermline Athletic**; **Partick Thistle**; Queen's Park	Kelty Hearts; Stenhousemuir	Elgin City; The Spartans

=== Matches ===
6 February 2026	Airdrieonians	**1–2** (a.e.t.)	**St Mirren**	Airdrie
19:45	Henderson 65'		Devaney 19'; Idowu 115'	Stadium: Excelsior Stadium; Attendance: 2,900; Referee: Kevin Clancy

7 February 2026	**Dunfermline Athletic**	**2–0**	Kelty Hearts	Dunfermline
15:00	Kane 75', 87'			Stadium: East End Park; Attendance: 4,976; Referee: Lloyd Wilson

7 February 2026	Elgin City	**2–3**	**Partick Thistle**	Elgin
15:00	Sargent 39', 74'		Crawford 17'; Watt 44' (pen.); Stanway 80'	Stadium: Borough Briggs; Attendance: 2,754; Referee: Colin Steven

7 February 2026	**Celtic**	**2–1** (a.e.t.)	Dundee	Glasgow
17:30	Adamu 90'; Tounekti 92'		Hamilton 49'	Stadium: Celtic Park; Attendance: 24,120; Referee: Ryan Lee

8 February 2026	**Rangers**	**8–0**	Queen's Park	Glasgow
14:00	Naderi 8', 49'; Tavernier 18', 26', 39' (pen.); Shiels 43' (o.g.); Miovski 80'; Chukwuani 90'			Stadium: Ibrox Stadium; Attendance: 36,190; Referee: Ross Hardie

8 February 2026	Stenhousemuir	**0–2** (a.e.t.)	**Falkirk**	Stenhousemuir
19:30			Spencer 104'; Stewart 108'	Stadium: Ochilview Park; Attendance: 2,514; Referee: Duncan Nicolson

17 February 2026	**Dundee United**	**2–1**	The Spartans	Dundee
19:45	Graham 31'; Fatah 55'		Stowe 78'	Stadium: Tannadice Park; Attendance: 4,298; Referee: Grant Irvine

18 February 2026	**Aberdeen**	**2–0**	Motherwell	Aberdeen
19:45	Nisbet 4'; Shinnie 63'			Stadium: Pittodrie Stadium; Attendance: 9,744; Referee: John Beaton

== Quarter-finals ==
The draw for the quarter-finals was made on 8 February 2026 following the Stenhousemuir v Falkirk match live on BBC Scotland. The fixture between Rangers and Celtic made headline news as fans clashed on the pitch following the full time whistle.

Teams in italics were not known at the time of the draw.

Teams in bold advanced to the semi-finals.

Premiership	Championship
Aberdeen; **Celtic**; Dundee United; **Falkirk**; Rangers; **St Mirren**	**Dunfermline Athletic**; Partick Thistle

=== Matches ===
6 March 2026	**Falkirk**	**2–1**	Dundee United	Falkirk
19:45	Stewart 10'; Yeats 21'		Eskesen 45'	Stadium: Falkirk Stadium; Attendance: 7,151; Referee: Steven McLean

7 March 2026	**Dunfermline Athletic**	**3–0**	Aberdeen	Dunfermline
19:30	Todd 14'; Thomas 22', 61'			Stadium: East End Park; Attendance: 10,399; Referee: Ryan Lee

8 March 2026	Rangers	**0–0** (a.e.t.) (**2–4** p)	**Celtic**	Glasgow
13:00				Stadium: Ibrox Stadium; Attendance: 51,215; Referee: Don Robertson
	**Penalties**
	Tavernier (penalty missed); Bajrami (penalty scored); Naderi (penalty scored); Gassama (penalty missed)		Oxlade-Chamberlain (penalty scored); Trusty (penalty scored); Hatate (penalty scored); Čvančara (penalty scored)

8 March 2026	**St Mirren**	**2–1**	Partick Thistle	Paisley
19:30	Nlundulu 33' (pen.); Young 45'		Stanway 61'	Stadium: St Mirren Park; Attendance: 5,548; Referee: David Dickinson

== Semi-finals ==
The draw for the semi-finals was made on 8 March 2026 following the St Mirren v Partick Thistle match live on BBC Scotland.

Teams in bold advanced to the final.

Premiership	Championship
**Celtic**; Falkirk; St Mirren	**Dunfermline Athletic**

=== Matches ===
18 April 2026	**Dunfermline Athletic**	**0–0** (a.e.t.) (**4–2** p)	Falkirk	Glasgow
12:30				Stadium: Hampden Park; Attendance: 25,237; Referee: John Beaton
	**Penalties**
	Cooper (penalty scored); Gilmour (penalty scored); Hamilton (penalty scored); Oakley-Boothe (penalty scored)		Spencer (penalty missed); Henderson (penalty missed); Parkinson (penalty scored); Lissah (penalty scored)

19 April 2026	**Celtic**	**6–2** (a.e.t.)	St Mirren	Glasgow
14:00	Maeda 1'; Ralston 45+3'; Iheanacho 96', 100'; McCowan 98'; Nygren 102'		Mandron 53', 90+1'	Stadium: Hampden Park; Attendance: 47,149; Referee: Matthew MacDermid

== Final ==
23 May 2026
15:00 BST

Celtic	3–1	Dunfermline Athletic
Maeda 19'; Engels 36'; Iheanacho 73'	Report	Cooper 80'

Hampden Park, Glasgow
Attendance: 49,613
Referee: Steven McLean

== Broadcasting ==
The Scottish Cup is broadcast by Premier Sports and BBC Scotland. Premier Sports has the first two picks and the fifth pick of the fourth and fifth rounds, 2 quarter-finals as well as first pick of one semi-final and airs the final non-exclusively. BBC Scotland broadcasts one match per round from the first round onwards and two matches per round from the fourth round to the quarter-finals, as well as one semi-final and the final.

The following matches were selected for live coverage on UK television:

Round	BBC Scotland	Premier Sports
First round	Auchinleck Talbot v Cumnock Juniors	
Second round	Formartine United v Buckie Thistle	
Third round	Linlithgow Rose v Queen's Park	
Fourth round	Dunfermline Athletic v Hibernian; Aberdeen v Raith Rovers	Rangers v Annan Athletic; Heart of Midlothian v Falkirk; Auchinleck Talbot v Celtic
Fifth round	Airdrieonians v St Mirren; Stenhousemuir v Falkirk	Celtic v Dundee; Aberdeen v Motherwell; Rangers v Queen's Park
Quarter-finals	Falkirk v Dundee United; St Mirren v Partick Thistle	Dunfermline Athletic v Aberdeen; Rangers v Celtic
Semi-finals	Dunfermline Athletic v Falkirk	Dunfermline Athletic v Falkirk; Celtic v St Mirren
Final	Celtic v Dunfermline Athletic	
