= 2023–24 Newcastle United F.C. season =

131st Newcastle United season

Newcastle United
2023–24 season
- Owners: Public Investment Fund (80%); RB Sports & Media (14%); PCP Capital Partners (6%)
- Chairman: Yasir Al-Rumayyan
- Head coach: Eddie Howe
- Stadium: St James' Park
- Premier League: 7th
- FA Cup: Quarter-finals
- EFL Cup: Quarter-finals
- UEFA Champions League: Group stage
- Top goalscorer: League: Alexander Isak (21); All: Alexander Isak (25)
- Highest home attendance: 52,227 vs Chelsea, Premier League, 25 November 2023
- Average home league attendance: 52,211
- Biggest win: 8–0 vs Sheffield United, Premier League, 24 September 2023
- Biggest defeat: 0–3 vs Everton, Premier League, 7 December 2023; 1–4 vs Tottenham Hotspur, Premier League, 10 December 2023; 1–4 vs Arsenal, Premier League, 24 February 2024
Home colours	Away colours	Third colours

The 2023–24 season was the 131st season in the existence of Newcastle United and the club's seventh consecutive season in the Premier League. In addition to the domestic league, they also competed in the FA Cup, EFL Cup and UEFA Champions League, entering the latter for the first time since the 2003–04 season and also in any European competition for the first time since the 2012–13 season.

== Squad ==
Note: Flags indicate national team as has been defined under FIFA eligibility rules. Players may hold more than one non-FIFA nationality.

Squad no.	Player	Nationality	Position(s)	Date of birth (age)	Signed in	Previous club
Goalkeepers
1	Martin Dúbravka	(Slovakia)	GK	15 January 1989 (aged 35)	2018 (Note: Dúbravka signed on loan in January 2018, which turned into a permanent deal in May 2018.)	(Czech Republic) Sparta Prague
18	Loris Karius	(Germany)	GK	22 June 1993 (aged 31)	2022	(England) Liverpool
22	Nick Pope	(England)	GK	19 April 1992 (aged 32)	2022	(England) Burnley
29	Mark Gillespie	(England)	GK	27 March 1992 (aged 32)	2020	(Scotland) Motherwell
Defenders
2	Kieran Trippier	(England)	RB	19 September 1990 (aged 33)	2022	(Spain) Atlético Madrid
3	Paul Dummett	(Wales) (Note: Dummett was born in Newcastle upon Tyne, England.)	CB / LB	26 September 1991 (aged 32)	2010	Academy
4	Sven Botman	(Netherlands)	CB	12 January 2000 (aged 24)	2022	(France) Lille
5	Fabian Schär	(Switzerland)	CB	20 December 1991 (aged 32)	2018	(Spain) Deportivo La Coruña
6	Jamaal Lascelles	(England)	CB	11 November 1993 (aged 30)	2014	(England) Nottingham Forest
13	Matt Targett	(England)	LB / LWB	18 September 1995 (aged 28)	2022 (Note: Targett signed on loan in January 2022, which turned into a permanent deal in June 2022.)	(England) Aston Villa
17	Emil Krafth	(Sweden)	RB / CB	2 August 1994 (aged 29)	2019	(France) Amiens
20	Lewis Hall	(England)	LB / LWB / CM	8 September 2004 (aged 19)	2023 (Note: Hall signed on loan in August 2023, which has an obligation to turn into a permanent deal in July 2024.)	(England) Chelsea (On Loan)
21	Tino Livramento	(England)	RB / LB	12 November 2002 (aged 21)	2023	(England) Southampton
33	Dan Burn	(England)	CB / LB	9 May 1992 (aged 32)	2022	(England) Brighton & Hove Albion
Midfielders
7	Joelinton	(Brazil)	CM / LW / ST	16 August 1996 (aged 27)	2019	(Germany) 1899 Hoffenheim
8	Sandro Tonali	(Italy)	DM / CM	8 May 2000 (aged 24)	2023	(Italy) Milan
10	Anthony Gordon	(England)	LW / RW / AM / ST	24 February 2001 (aged 23)	2023	(England) Everton
11	Matt Ritchie	(Scotland) (Note: Ritchie was born in Gosport, England.)	LW / LWB	10 September 1989 (aged 34)	2016	(England) Bournemouth
15	Harvey Barnes	(England)	LW	9 December 1997 (aged 26)	2023	(England) Leicester City
23	Jacob Murphy	(England)	RW / RWB / LW	24 February 1995 (aged 29)	2017	(England) Norwich City
24	Miguel Almirón	(Paraguay)	AM / RW	10 February 1994 (aged 30)	2019	(United States) Atlanta United
28	Joe Willock	(England)	CM / AM	20 August 1999 (aged 24)	2021	(England) Arsenal
32	Elliot Anderson	(Scotland) (Note: Anderson was born in Whitley Bay, England.)	AM / LW / RW / CM	6 November 2002 (aged 21)	2021	Academy
36	Sean Longstaff	(England)	CM	30 September 1997 (aged 26)	2016	Academy
39	Bruno Guimarães	(Brazil)	CM / DM	16 November 1997 (aged 26)	2022	(France) Lyon
67	Lewis Miley	(England)	CM / DM	1 May 2006 (aged 18)	2023	Academy
Forwards
9	Callum Wilson	(England)	ST	27 February 1992 (aged 32)	2020	(England) Bournemouth
14	Alexander Isak	(Sweden)	ST / LW	21 September 1999 (aged 24)	2022	(Spain) Real Sociedad
Reserves and Academy players who are currently or were previously with the first-team squad
40	Joe White	(England)	AM / CM	1 October 2002 (aged 21)	2021	Academy
49	Amadou Diallo	(England)	LW / RW	15 February 2003 (aged 21)	2022	(England) West Ham United
54	Alex Murphy	(Republic of Ireland)	LB / CB	25 June 2004 (aged 20)	2022	(Republic of Ireland) Galway United
63	Ben Parkinson	(England)	ST / RW / LW	10 March 2005 (aged 19)	2023	Academy
82	Adam Harrison	(England)	GK	20 October 2006 (aged 17)	2023	Academy
84	Aidan Harris	(England)	GK	16 December 2006 (aged 17)	2023	Academy
90	Travis Hernes	(Norway)	CM	4 November 2005 (aged 18)	2023	(England) Shrewsbury Town
Out on Loan
12	Jamal Lewis	(Northern Ireland) (Note: Lewis was born in Luton, England.)	LB / LWB	25 January 1998 (aged 26)	2020	(England) Norwich City
30	Harrison Ashby	(Scotland) (Note: Ashby was born in Milton Keynes, England.)	RB	14 November 2001 (aged 22)	2023	(England) West Ham United
31	Kelland Watts	(England)	CB	3 November 1999 (aged 24)	2018	Academy
55	Michael Ndiweni	(England)	ST	2 December 2003 (aged 20)	2023	Academy
—	Isaac Hayden	(England)	CM / DM / CB	22 March 1995 (aged 29)	2016	(England) Arsenal
—	Jeff Hendrick	(Republic of Ireland)	CM	31 January 1992 (aged 32)	2020	(England) Burnley
—	Ryan Fraser	(Scotland)	LW / RW / AM	24 February 1994 (aged 30)	2020	(England) Bournemouth
—	Garang Kuol	(Australia) (Note: Kuol was born in Cairo, Egypt.)	LW / RW / ST	15 September 2004 (aged 19)	2023	(Australia) Central Coast Mariners
—	Yankuba Minteh	(The Gambia)	RW / LW	22 July 2004 (aged 19)	2023	(Denmark) OB

== Transfers ==
=== Transfers in ===
Date	Position	Nationality	Player	From	Fee	Ref.
1 July 2023 (Note: The transfer was announced on 12 June 2023, and would become official on 1 July 2023.)	RW	(The Gambia)	Yankuba Minteh	(Denmark) OB	£6,000,000	
3 July 2023	DM	(Italy)	Sandro Tonali	(Italy) Milan	£55,000,000	
23 July 2023	LW	(England)	Harvey Barnes	(England) Leicester City	£38,000,000	
8 August 2023	RB	(England)	Tino Livramento	(England) Southampton	£35,000,000	
24 August 2023	CB	(Republic of Ireland)	Cathal Heffernan	(Italy) Milan	Undisclosed	
1 September 2023	CM	(Norway)	Travis Hernes	(England) Shrewsbury Town	Undisclosed	
1 February 2024	CM	(England)	Alfie Harrison	(England) Manchester City	Undisclosed	

=== Loans in ===
Date from	Position	Nationality	Player	From	Date until	Ref.
22 August 2023	LB	(England)	Lewis Hall	(England) Chelsea	End of Season	

=== Loans out ===
Date from	Position	Nationality	Player	To	Date until	Ref.
28 June 2023	LB	(England)	Matthew Bondswell	(Wales) Newport County	End of Season	
1 July 2023 (Note: The transfer was announced on 12 June 2023, and would become official on 1 July 2023.)	RW	(The Gambia)	Yankuba Minteh	(Netherlands) Feyenoord	End of Season	
27 July 2023	CB	(England)	Kelland Watts	(England) Wigan Athletic	End of Season	
27 July 2023	LB	(Northern Ireland)	Jamal Lewis	(England) Watford	End of Season	
4 August 2023	RB	(Scotland)	Harrison Ashby	(Wales) Swansea City	End of Season	
7 August 2023	GK	(England)	Max Thompson	(England) Northampton Town	1 January 2024	
8 August 2023	LW	(Australia)	Garang Kuol	(Netherlands) Volendam	End of Season	
24 August 2023	AM	(England)	Jay Turner-Cooke	(Scotland) St Johnstone	1 February 2024 (Note: On 1 February 2024, Jay Turner-Cooke returned from his loan spell at St Johnstone. His loan was originally due to expire at the end of the season.)	
25 August 2023	LW	(Scotland)	Ryan Fraser	(England) Southampton	End of Season	
26 August 2023	CF	(England)	Cameron Ferguson	(Scotland) Forfar Athletic	13 January 2024	
31 August 2023	AM	(England)	Joe White	(England) Crewe Alexandra	14 January 2024	
1 September 2023	CM	(Republic of Ireland)	Jeff Hendrick	(England) Sheffield Wednesday	End of Season	
5 September 2023	DM	(England)	Isaac Hayden	(Belgium) Standard Liège	1 February 2024 (Note: On 1 February 2024, Isaac Hayden returned from his loan spell at Standard Liège. His loan was originally due to expire at the end of the season.)	
5 September 2023	AM	(Peru)	Rodrigo Vilca	(Serbia) Voždovac	End of Season	
25 January 2024	CF	(England)	Dylan Stephenson	(England) South Shields	End of Season	
1 February 2024	DM	(England)	Isaac Hayden	(England) Queens Park Rangers	End of Season	
1 February 2024	CF	(England)	Michael Ndiweni	(Scotland) Annan Athletic	End of Season	

=== Transfers out ===
Date	Position	Nationality	Player	To	Fee	Ref.
14 June 2023 (Note: The transfer was announced on 2 June 2023, and would become official on 14 June 2023 once the transfer window opened.)	CF	(New Zealand)	Chris Wood	(England) Nottingham Forest	£15,000,000	
28 July 2023	GK	(England)	Karl Darlow	(England) Leeds United	£400,000	
29 July 2023	LW	(France)	Allan Saint-Maximin	(Saudi Arabia) Al-Ahli	£23,000,000	
21 January 2024	RB	(Spain)	Javier Manquillo	(Spain) Celta Vigo	Free transfer	
25 January 2024	CB	(England)	Remi Savage	(Scotland) Inverness Caledonian Thistle	Free transfer	
1 February 2024	LB	(England)	Joshua Scott	(Scotland) Queen's Park	Free transfer	
2 February 2024	CB	(England)	Charlie Wiggett	(Republic of Ireland) Sligo Rovers	Free transfer	

=== Released ===
Date	Position	Nationality	Player	Subsequent club	Join date	Ref.
1 July 2023	CF	(England)	Isaac Westendorf	(Northern Ireland) Larne	1 July 2023	
1 July 2023	CM	(England)	Lucas Cooper	(England) AFC Blyth	10 July 2023	
1 July 2023	RB	(England)	Joe Oliver	(England) Blyth Spartans	18 August 2023	
1 July 2023	CF	(Democratic Republic of the Congo)	Nathaniel Nkunku	(England) Morpeth Town	19 August 2023	
1 July 2023	GK	(England)	Dan Langley	(England) Blyth Spartans	29 August 2023	
1 July 2023	DM	(England)	Niall Brookwell	(England) Workington	10 September 2023	
1 July 2023	CB	(England)	Harry Barclay	(England) Dunston UTS	3 October 2023	
1 July 2023	CB	(Republic of Ireland)	Ciaran Clark	(England) Stoke City	10 October 2023	
1 July 2023	RB	(England)	Josh Stewart	(England) West Allotment Celtic	23 November 2023	
1 July 2023	GK	(England)	Steven Bessent	(England) Loughborough Students	13 January 2024	
1 July 2023	CM	(England)	Matty Longstaff	(Canada) Toronto FC	29 February 2024	
1 July 2023	LB	(England)	Beau Beresford	Currently unattached		
1 July 2023	RB	(England)	Callum McNally	Currently unattached		
25 January 2024	CF	(England)	Cameron Ferguson	Currently unattached		

== Pre-season and friendlies ==
Win Draw Loss

Newcastle United confirmed their first pre-season friendly with a trip to Scotland to face Rangers. The Magpies also announced a tour of the United States to take part in the Premier League Summer Series pre-season tournament, with matches against Aston Villa, Chelsea and Brighton & Hove Albion. On 14 June, a fifth friendly match was confirmed, against Gateshead. On 7 July, it was confirmed that the inaugural Sela Cup would take place at St James' Park during the first weekend of August, with Newcastle competing against Fiorentina and Villarreal on 5 and 6 August, respectively.

In March 2024, it was announced that Newcastle United would travel to Melbourne, Australia for post-season matches against Tottenham Hotspur and the A-League All Stars Men on 22 and 24 May 2024, respectively.

15 July 2023 Friendly	Gateshead	2–3	Newcastle United	Gateshead
12:30 BST	Dinanga 12'; Wearne 45'	Report	Anderson 50'; Saint-Maximin 59'; Turner-Cooke 81'	Stadium: Gateshead International Stadium; Referee: Adam Herczeg

18 July 2023 Friendly	Rangers	1–2	Newcastle United	Glasgow, Scotland
19:45 BST	Lammers 64'	Report	Almirón 16'; Ashby 87'	Stadium: Ibrox Stadium; Attendance: 51,000; Referee: David Dickinson (Scotland)

23 July 2023 Premier League Summer Series	Newcastle United	3–3	Aston Villa	Philadelphia, United States
19:00 EDT	Anderson 28'; Isak 45+2'; Wilson 55'; Burn (yellow card) 90+4'	Report	Watkins 7'; Buendía 11', 48'	Stadium: Lincoln Financial Field; Attendance: 40,230; Referee: Lukasz Szpala (United States)

26 July 2023 Premier League Summer Series	Newcastle United	1–1	Chelsea	Atlanta, United States
20:15 EDT	Schär (yellow card) 20'; Almirón 45+4'	Report	Jackson 12'; Gallagher (yellow card) 83'	Stadium: Mercedes-Benz Stadium; Attendance: 70,789; Referee: Peter Bankes

28 July 2023 Premier League Summer Series	Brighton & Hove Albion	1–2	Newcastle United	Harrison, United States
19:30 EDT	Welbeck 49'; Van Hecke (yellow card) 64'	Report	Bruno Guimarães (yellow card) 30'; Pope (yellow card) 74'; Anderson 86', 90+2'	Stadium: Red Bull Arena; Attendance: 26,150; Referee: Sergii Demianchuk (United States)

5 August 2023 Sela Cup	Newcastle United	2–0	Fiorentina	Newcastle upon Tyne
15:30 BST	Almirón 39'; Isak 82'	Report	Milenković (yellow card) 87'	Stadium: St James' Park; Attendance: 36,725; Referee: Michael Oliver (England)

6 August 2023 Sela Cup	Newcastle United	4–0	Villarreal	Newcastle upon Tyne
16:00 BST	Murphy 6'; Joelinton (yellow card) 22', (goal) 75'; Longstaff (yellow card) 31'; Ritchie (yellow card) 34'; Dummett (yellow card) 47'; Barnes 61', 78'	Report	Terrats (yellow card) 13'; Baena (yellow card) 28'; Lanchi (yellow card) 63'	Stadium: St James' Park; Attendance: 34,621; Referee: Anthony Taylor (England)

22 May 2024 Global Football Week	Tottenham Hotspur	1–1 (4–5 p)	Newcastle United	Melbourne, Australia
19:45 AEST	Maddison 32'; Skipp (yellow card) 54'	Report	Isak 45'	Stadium: Melbourne Cricket Ground; Attendance: 78,419; Referee: Alireza Faghani (Australia)
	Penalties
	Gil (penalty missed); Scarlett (penalty scored); Donley (penalty scored); Hall (penalty scored); Skipp (penalty scored)		(penalty scored) White; (penalty scored) Parkinson; (penalty scored) Diallo; (penalty scored) Kuol; (penalty scored) Ashby

24 May 2024 A-Leagues All Stars game	A-Leagues All Stars Men	8–0	Newcastle United	Melbourne, Australia
17:15 AEST	Old 5'; Milanovic 25'; Taggart 34'; Stamatelopoulos 62', 74'; Hollman 82'; Courtney-Perkins 89'; Kraev 90+2'	Report	Ashby (yellow card) 87'	Stadium: Marvel Stadium; Referee: Daniel Elder (Australia)

== Competitions ==
=== Overall record ===
Competition	First match	Last match	Starting round	Final position	Record							
Competition	First match	Last match	Starting round	Final position	Pld	W	D	L	GF	GA	GD	Win %
Premier League	12 August 2023	19 May 2024	Matchday 1	7th	38	18	6	14	85	62	+23	47.37
FA Cup	6 January 2024	16 March 2024	Third round	Quarter-finals	4	2	1	1	6	3	+3	50.00
EFL Cup	27 September 2023	19 December 2023	Third round	Quarter-finals	3	2	1	0	5	1	+4	66.67
UEFA Champions League	19 September 2023	13 December 2023	Group stage	Group stage	6	1	2	3	6	7	−1	16.67
Total					51	23	10	18	102	73	+29	45.10

Source: Soccerway

=== Premier League ===
==== League table ====
Pos	Team	Pld	W	D	L	GF	GA	GD	Pts	Qualification or relegation
5	Tottenham Hotspur	38	20	6	12	74	61	+13	66	Qualification for the Europa League league phase
6	Chelsea	38	18	9	11	77	63	+14	63	Qualification for the Conference League play-off round (Note: Since the winners of the 2023–24 EFL Cup, Liverpool, qualified for the Champions League, the spot given to the League Cup winners (Conference League play-off round) was passed to the sixth-placed team.)
7	Newcastle United	38	18	6	14	85	62	+23	60	
8	Manchester United	38	18	6	14	57	58	−1	60	Qualification for the Europa League league phase (Note: Manchester United qualified for the Europa League league phase as the 2023–24 FA Cup winners.)
9	West Ham United	38	14	10	14	60	74	−14	52	

Source: Premier League
Rules for classification: 1) Points; 2) Goal difference; 3) Goals scored; 4) If the champions, relegated teams or qualified teams for UEFA competitions cannot be determined by rules 1 to 3, rules 4.1 to 4.3 are applied – 4.1) Points gained in head-to-head record between such teams; 4.2) Away goals scored in head-to-head record between such teams; 4.3) Play-offs

==== Results summary ====
Overall								Home						Away					
Pld	W	D	L	GF	GA	GD	Pts	W	D	L	GF	GA	GD	W	D	L	GF	GA	GD
38	18	6	14	85	62	+23	60	12	4	3	49	22	+27	6	2	11	36	40	−4

Source: Soccerway

==== Results by round ====
Round	1	2	3	4	5	6	7	8	9	10	11	12	13	14	15	16	17	18	19	20	21	22	23	24	25	26	27	28	30	31	32	33	29^{1}	35	36	37	34^{2}	38
Ground	H	A	H	A	H	A	H	A	H	A	H	A	H	H	A	A	H	A	H	A	H	A	H	A	H	A	H	A	H	H	A	H	A	H	A	H	A	A
Result	W	L	L	L	W	W	W	D	W	D	W	L	W	W	L	L	W	L	L	L	L	W	D	W	D	L	W	L	W	D	W	W	L	W	W	D	L	W
Position	1	8	13	14	12	8	8	8	6	6	6	7	7	6	7	7	6	7	9	9	10	8	9	7	8	10	8	10	8	8	8	6	7	7	6	6	7	7
Points	3	3	3	3	6	9	12	13	16	17	20	20	23	26	26	26	29	29	29	29	29	32	33	36	37	37	40	40	43	44	47	50	50	53	56	57	57	60

Source: Soccerway
A = Away; H = Home; W = Win; D = Draw; L = Loss; P = Postponed

==== Matches ====
On 15 June, the Premier League fixtures were released.

Win Draw Loss Fixtures

12 August 2023 1	Newcastle United	5–1	Aston Villa	Newcastle upon Tyne
17:30 BST	Tonali 6', (yellow card) 90+2'; Isak 16', 58'; Botman (yellow card) 45+9'; Gordon (yellow card) 53'; Bruno Guimarães (yellow card) 67'; Wilson 77'; Barnes 90+1'	Report	Douglas Luiz (yellow card) 6'; Diaby 11'; Digne (yellow card) 32'; Martínez (yellow card) 45+9'; Cash (yellow card) 48'	Stadium: St James' Park; Attendance: 52,207; Referee: Andrew Madley
Note: Live on Sky Sports

19 August 2023 2	Manchester City	1–0	Newcastle United	Manchester
20:00 BST	Álvarez 31', (yellow card) 46'	Report	Gordon (yellow card) 24'; Tonali (yellow card) 34'; Joelinton (yellow card) 54'; Barnes (yellow card) 58'; Bruno Guimarães (yellow card) 71'	Stadium: Etihad Stadium; Attendance: 53,080; Referee: Robert Jones
Note: Live on TNT Sports

27 August 2023 3	Newcastle United	1–2	Liverpool	Newcastle upon Tyne
16:30 BST	Gordon 25'; Trippier (yellow card) 51'	Report	Alexander-Arnold (yellow card) 6'; Van Dijk (red card) 28'; Núñez 81', 90+3', (yellow card) 85'	Stadium: St James' Park; Attendance: 52,214; Referee: John Brooks
Note: Live on Sky Sports

2 September 2023 4	Brighton & Hove Albion	3–1	Newcastle United	Falmer
17:30 BST	Ferguson 27', 65', 70'; Lamptey (yellow card) 83'; Milner (yellow card) 86'; Dahoud (yellow card) 90+5'; Lallana (yellow card) 90+8'	Report	Gordon (yellow card) 23'; Schär (yellow card) 43'; Targett (yellow card) 68'; Burn (yellow card) 76'; Wilson 90+2'	Stadium: Falmer Stadium; Attendance: 31,620; Referee: Stuart Attwell
Note: Live on Sky Sports

16 September 2023 5	Newcastle United	1–0	Brentford	Newcastle upon Tyne
17:30 BST	Wilson 64' (pen.), (yellow card) 90+5'; Gordon (yellow card) 90+5'; Bruno Guimarães (yellow card) 90+7'	Report	Wissa (yellow card) 33'; Nørgaard (yellow card) 42'; Hickey (yellow card) 59'; Flekken (yellow card) 64'; Collins (yellow card) 85'	Stadium: St James' Park; Attendance: 51,670; Referee: Craig Pawson
Note: Live on Sky Sports; The match was rescheduled from 16:30 BST on 17 September, following the scheduling of the UEFA Champions League group stage fixtures.

24 September 2023 6	Sheffield United	0–8	Newcastle United	Sheffield
16:30 BST	Ahmedhodžić (yellow card) 28'; Robinson (yellow card) 34'; Ben Slimane (yellow card) 75'; Egan (yellow card) 90+4'	Report	Longstaff 21'; Burn 31'; Botman 35'; Wilson 56'; Gordon 61'; Almirón 68'; Bruno Guimarães 73'; Isak 87'	Stadium: Bramall Lane; Attendance: 30,568; Referee: Stuart Attwell
Note: Live on Sky Sports

30 September 2023 7	Newcastle United	2–0	Burnley	Newcastle upon Tyne
15:00 BST	Almirón 14'; Gordon (yellow card) 18'; Isak 76' (pen.)	Report	Amdouni (yellow card) 29'; Beyer (yellow card) 40'; Taylor (yellow card) 53'	Stadium: St James' Park; Attendance: 52,163; Referee: Thomas Bramall

8 October 2023 8	West Ham United	2–2	Newcastle United	Stratford
14:00 BST	Souček 8'; Emerson (yellow card) 16'; Antonio (yellow card) 35'; Paquetá (yellow card) 70'; Kudus 89'	Report	Bruno Guimarães (yellow card) 17'; Isak 57', 62'; Almirón (yellow card) 67'; Longstaff (yellow card) 79'	Stadium: London Stadium; Attendance: 62,473; Referee: Peter Bankes

21 October 2023 9	Newcastle United	4–0	Crystal Palace	Newcastle upon Tyne
15:00 BST	Murphy 4'; Longstaff (yellow card) 39', (goal) 45+2'; Gordon 44'; Trippier (yellow card) 45+5'; Wilson 66'	Report	Mateta (yellow card) 29'; Édouard (yellow card) 45+5'; Mitchell (yellow card) 60'	Stadium: St James' Park; Attendance: 52,189; Referee: Tim Robinson

28 October 2023 10	Wolverhampton Wanderers	2–2	Newcastle United	Wolverhampton
17:30 BST	Lemina 36'; Hwang 71'; Aït-Nouri (yellow card) 83'	Report	Wilson 22', 45+4' (pen.); Burn (yellow card) 66'; Lascelles (yellow card) 69'; Trippier (yellow card) 82'; Longstaff (yellow card) 90+6'	Stadium: Molineux; Attendance: 31,584; Referee: Anthony Taylor
Note: Live on Sky Sports

4 November 2023 11	Newcastle United	1–0	Arsenal	Newcastle upon Tyne
17:30 GMT	Gordon (yellow card) 37', (goal) 64'; Longstaff (yellow card) 38'; Schär (yellow card) 39'; Bruno Guimarães (yellow card) 88'; Livramento (yellow card) 90+1'	Report	Havertz (yellow card) 37'	Stadium: St James' Park; Attendance: 52,194; Referee: Stuart Attwell
Note: Live on Sky Sports

11 November 2023 12	Bournemouth	2–0	Newcastle United	Bournemouth
17:30 GMT	Cook (yellow card) 57'; Solanke 60', 73'; Senesi (yellow card) 86'	Report	Lascelles (yellow card) 85'	Stadium: Vitality Stadium; Attendance: 11,201; Referee: Chris Kavanagh
Note: Live on Sky Sports

25 November 2023 13	Newcastle United	4–1	Chelsea	Newcastle upon Tyne
15:00 GMT	Isak 13'; Trippier (yellow card) 22'; Joelinton (yellow card) 45+3', (goal) 61'; Lascelles (yellow card) 46', (goal) 60'; Gordon 83'; Ritchie (yellow card) 90+2'	Report	Sterling 23', (yellow card) 59'; Ugochukwu (yellow card) 41'; James (yellow card) 55' (yellow-red card) 73'; Cucurella (yellow card) 77'; Colwill (yellow card) 81'	Stadium: St James' Park; Attendance: 52,227; Referee: Simon Hooper

2 December 2023 14	Newcastle United	1–0	Manchester United	Newcastle upon Tyne
20:00 GMT	Gordon 55'; Joelinton (yellow card) 90+7'	Report	Maguire (yellow card) 77'; Antony (yellow card) 90+2'	Stadium: St James' Park; Attendance: 52,214; Referee: Robert Jones
Note: Live on TNT Sports

7 December 2023 15	Everton	3–0	Newcastle United	Walton
19:30 GMT	Gueye (yellow card) 35'; McNeil 79'; Calvert-Lewin (yellow card) 83'; Doucouré 86'; Beto (yellow card) 87', (goal) 90+6'	Report		Stadium: Goodison Park; Attendance: 38,198; Referee: Tim Robinson
Note: Live on Amazon Prime Video

10 December 2023 16	Tottenham Hotspur	4–1	Newcastle United	Tottenham
16:30 GMT	Udogie 26'; Richarlison 38', 60'; Romero (yellow card) 80'; Son 85' (pen.)	Report	Lascelles (yellow card) 59'; Joelinton (yellow card) 69', (goal) 90+1'; Trippier (yellow card) 83'	Stadium: Tottenham Hotspur Stadium; Attendance: 61,171; Referee: Chris Kavanagh
Note: Live on Sky Sports

16 December 2023 17	Newcastle United	3–0	Fulham	Newcastle upon Tyne
15:00 GMT	Miley 57'; Almirón 64'; Burn 82'	Report	Jiménez (red card) 22'; Palhinha (yellow card) 70'; Decordova-Reid (yellow card) 81'	Stadium: St James' Park; Attendance: 52,055; Referee: Sam Barrott

23 December 2023 18	Luton Town	1–0	Newcastle United	Luton
15:00 GMT	Townsend 25'; Barkley (yellow card) 56'; Mengi (yellow card) 89'	Report	Hall (yellow card) 90+4'	Stadium: Kenilworth Road; Attendance: 11,042; Referee: Darren England

26 December 2023 19	Newcastle United	1–3	Nottingham Forest	Newcastle upon Tyne
12:30 GMT	Isak 23' (pen.); Gordon (yellow card) 27'; Bruno Guimarães (yellow card) 85'; Schär (yellow card) 88'	Report	Sangaré (yellow card) 26'; Montiel (yellow card) 27'; Wood 45+1', 53', 60'; Williams (yellow card) 84'	Stadium: St James' Park; Attendance: 52,207; Referee: Chris Kavanagh
Note: Live on Amazon Prime Video

1 January 2024 20	Liverpool	4–2	Newcastle United	Liverpool
20:00 GMT	Salah (penalty missed) 22', 49', 86' (pen.); Díaz (yellow card) 45'; Alexander-Arnold (yellow card) 45+5'; Endō (yellow card) 65'; Jones 74'; Gakpo 78'	Report	Bruno Guimarães (yellow card) 28'; Miley (yellow card) 45+2'; Isak 54'; Joelinton (yellow card) 66'; Botman 81'; Dúbravka (yellow card) 84'; Longstaff (yellow card) 89'	Stadium: Anfield; Attendance: 57,471; Referee: Anthony Taylor
Note: Live on Sky Sports

13 January 2024 21	Newcastle United	2–3	Manchester City	Newcastle upon Tyne
17:30 GMT	Bruno Guimarães (yellow card) 21'; Isak 35'; Gordon 37'	Report	Silva 26', (yellow card) 55'; Rodri (yellow card) 45+4'; De Bruyne 74'; Bobb 90+1'	Stadium: St James' Park; Attendance: 52,190; Referee: Chris Kavanagh
Note: Live on TNT Sports

30 January 2024 22	Aston Villa	1–3	Newcastle United	Aston
20:15 GMT	Kamara (yellow card) 39'; Watkins 71'; Douglas Luiz (yellow card) 72'; McGinn (yellow card) 77'; Zaniolo (yellow card) 90+5'	Report	Schär 32', 36'; Moreno 52' (o.g.); Gordon (yellow card) 90+4'	Stadium: Villa Park; Attendance: 42,191; Referee: John Brooks
Note: Live on TNT Sports

3 February 2024 23	Newcastle United	4–4	Luton Town	Newcastle upon Tyne
15:00 GMT	Longstaff 7', 23'; Burn (yellow card) 56'; Trippier 67'; Barnes 73'; Murphy (yellow card) 76'	Report	Osho 21', (yellow card) 90'; Barkley 40'; Morris 59' (pen.); Sambi Lokonga (yellow card) 60'; Adebayo 62'	Stadium: St James' Park; Attendance: 52,211; Referee: Thomas Bramall

10 February 2024 24	Nottingham Forest	2–3	Newcastle United	West Bridgford
17:30 GMT	Elanga 26'; Hudson-Odoi 45+6'; Gibbs-White (yellow card) 59'	Report	Bruno Guimarães 10', 66'; Schär 43'; Botman (yellow card) 58'; Wilson (yellow card) 90+4'	Stadium: City Ground; Attendance: 29,451; Referee: Anthony Taylor
Note: Live on Sky Sports

17 February 2024 25	Newcastle United	2–2	Bournemouth	Newcastle upon Tyne
15:00 GMT	Gordon 58' (pen.); Schär (yellow card) 87'; Ritchie 90+2'	Report	Christie (yellow card) 44'; Solanke 51'; Senesi (yellow card) 52'; Zabarnyi (yellow card) 62'; Semenyo 69'	Stadium: St James' Park; Attendance: 52,224; Referee: Michael Salisbury

24 February 2024 26	Arsenal	4–1	Newcastle United	Holloway
20:00 GMT	Ødegaard (yellow card) 7'; Botman 18' (o.g.); Havertz 24'; Saka 65'; Kiwior 69'	Report	Willock 84'	Stadium: Emirates Stadium; Attendance: 60,298; Referee: Paul Tierney
Note: Live on TNT Sports

2 March 2024 27	Newcastle United	3–0	Wolverhampton Wanderers	Newcastle upon Tyne
15:00 GMT	Isak 14'; Gordon 33'; Livramento 90+2'	Report	Aït-Nouri (yellow card) 85'	Stadium: St James' Park; Attendance: 52,206; Referee: Tim Robinson

11 March 2024 28	Chelsea	3–2	Newcastle United	Fulham
20:00 GMT	Jackson 6'; Sterling (yellow card) 39'; Palmer 57'; Petrović (yellow card) 71'; Caicedo (yellow card) 72'; Mudryk 76'	Report	Isak 43'; Murphy 90'; White (yellow card) 90+6'	Stadium: Stamford Bridge; Attendance: 38,752; Referee: John Brooks
Note: Live on Sky Sports

30 March 2024 30	Newcastle United	4–3	West Ham United	Newcastle upon Tyne
12:30 GMT	Isak 6' (pen.), 77' (pen.), (yellow card) 90+4'; Gordon (yellow card) 80' (yellow-red card) 90+4'; Barnes 83', 90', (yellow card) 83'	Report	Antonio 21'; Souček (yellow card) 40'; Kudus 45+10'; Bowen 48'	Stadium: St James' Park; Attendance: 52,199; Referee: Robert Jones
Note: Fixture was originally scheduled for a 15:00 kick-off, but was brought forward for live TNT Sports coverage.

2 April 2024 31	Newcastle United	1–1	Everton	Newcastle upon Tyne
19:30 BST	Isak 15'	Report	Tarkowski (yellow card) 81'; Calvert-Lewin 88' (pen.); Chermiti (yellow card) 90+8'; McNeil (yellow card) 90+8'	Stadium: St James' Park; Attendance: 52,135; Referee: Tony Harrington
Note: Fixture was initially scheduled for 3 April, but was moved for live TNT Sports coverage.

6 April 2024 32	Fulham	0–1	Newcastle United	Fulham
15:00 BST	Lukić (yellow card) 68'	Report	Krafth (yellow card) 19'; Longstaff (yellow card) 51'; Bruno Guimarães 81'	Stadium: Craven Cottage; Attendance: 24,418; Referee: Sam Allison

13 April 2024 33	Newcastle United	4–0	Tottenham Hotspur	Newcastle upon Tyne
12:30 BST	Isak 30', 51'; Gordon 32'; Schär 87'	Report	Van de Ven (yellow card) 27'; Bissouma (yellow card) 47'; Romero (yellow card) 56'; Maddison (yellow card) 61'	Stadium: St James' Park; Referee: Tim Robinson
Note: Fixture was initially scheduled for a 15:00 kick-off, but was moved for live TNT Sports coverage.

24 April 2024 29	Crystal Palace	2–0	Newcastle United	Selhurst
20:00 GMT	Richards (yellow card) 41'; Ayew (yellow card) 45+1'; Mateta 55', 88'; Wharton (yellow card) 66'	Report	Gordon (yellow card) 60'; Longstaff (yellow card) 77'; Anderson (yellow card) 80'	Stadium: Selhurst Park; Attendance: 25,002; Referee: Thomas Bramall
Note: Fixture was originally scheduled for 16 March, but was postponed due to Newcastle's FA Cup progression.

27 April 2024 35	Newcastle United	5–1	Sheffield United	Newcastle upon Tyne
15:00 BST	Isak 26', 61' (pen.); Bruno Guimarães 54'; Osborn 65' (o.g.); Wilson 72'	Report	Ahmedhodžić 5'	Stadium: St James' Park; Attendance: 52,196; Referee: Tony Harrington

4 May 2024 36	Burnley	1–4	Newcastle United	Burnley
15:00 BST	Estève (yellow card) 37'; Brownhill (yellow card) 51'; O'Shea 86'	Report	Wilson (yellow card) 18', (goal) 19'; Longstaff 35'; Bruno Guimarães 40'; Isak (penalty missed) 52', 55'; Anderson (yellow card) 72'	Stadium: Turf Moor; Attendance: 21,781; Referee: Anthony Taylor

11 May 2024 37	Newcastle United	1–1	Brighton & Hove Albion	Newcastle upon Tyne
15:00 BST	Longstaff 45+5'; Hall (yellow card) 79'; Barnes (yellow card) 88'; Almirón (yellow card) 90+3'	Report	Veltman 18'; Gilmour (yellow card) 45+4'; Enciso (yellow card) 54'; Welbeck (yellow card) 77'; Baker-Boaitey (yellow card) 90+5'	Stadium: St James' Park; Attendance: 51,997; Referee: Darren England

15 May 2024 34	Manchester United	3–2	Newcastle United	Manchester
20:00 BST	Mainoo 31'; Amad 57', (yellow card) 81'; Casemiro (yellow card) 62'; Højlund 84'; Amrabat (yellow card) 87'	Report	Anderson (yellow card) 37'; Gordon 49', (yellow card) 68'; Schär (yellow card) 78'; Hall 90+2'	Stadium: Old Trafford; Attendance: 73,582; Referee: Robert Jones
Note: Fixture was initially scheduled for 20 April, but was rescheduled due to Manchester United's FA Cup progression.

19 May 2024 38	Brentford	2–4	Newcastle United	Brentford
16:00 BST	Toney (yellow card) 44'; Jensen (yellow card) 45+5'; Janelt 48'; Wissa (yellow card) 51', (goal) 70'; Maupay (yellow card) 90+5'	Report	Barnes 21'; Joelinton (yellow card) 28'; Murphy 36'; Isak 38'; Burn (yellow card) 53'; Krafth (yellow card) 66'; Bruno Guimarães 77'; Pope (yellow card) 90+5'	Stadium: Brentford Community Stadium; Attendance: 17,124; Referee: Simon Hooper

=== FA Cup ===
Newcastle entered the FA Cup in the third round, and were drawn away against local rivals Sunderland. They were then drawn away against Fulham in the fourth round, away to Blackburn Rovers in the fifth round, and away to holders Manchester City in the quarter-finals.

Win Draw Loss Fixtures

6 January 2024 Third round	Sunderland	0–3	Newcastle United	Sunderland
12:45 GMT	Hume (yellow card) 39'; Pritchard (yellow card) 61'; O'Nien (yellow card) 78'; Ballard (yellow card) 88'	Report	Ballard 35' (o.g.); Isak 46', 90' (pen.); Gordon (yellow card) 66'; Bruno Guimarães (yellow card) 72'	Stadium: Stadium of Light; Attendance: 44,814; Referee: Craig Pawson
Note: Live on ITV

27 January 2024 Fourth round	Fulham	0–2	Newcastle United	Fulham
19:00 GMT		Report	Schär (yellow card) 20'; Longstaff 39'; Burn 61'	Stadium: Craven Cottage; Attendance: 18,960; Referee: Jarred Gillett
Note: Live on ITV

27 February 2024 Fifth round	Blackburn Rovers	1–1 (a.e.t.) (3–4 p)	Newcastle United	Blackburn
20:00 GMT	Moran (yellow card) 18'; Szmodics 79'; Chrisene (yellow card) 110'; Ayari (yellow card) 118'	Report	Gordon 71'; Lascelles (yellow card) 103'; Longstaff (yellow card) 120+1'	Stadium: Ewood Park; Attendance: 22,730; Referee: Jarred Gillett
	Penalties
	Szmodics (penalty missed); Brittain (penalty scored); Sigurðsson (penalty scored); Ayari (penalty scored); Hyam (penalty missed)		(penalty scored) Schär; (penalty missed) Barnes; (penalty scored) Bruno Guimarães; (penalty scored) Anderson; (penalty scored) Gordon
Note: Live on BBC Sport

16 March 2024 Quarter-finals	Manchester City	2–0	Newcastle United	Manchester
17:30 GMT	Silva 13', 31'	Report	Schär (yellow card) 18'; Lascelles (yellow card) 28'; Almirón (yellow card) 90+3'	Stadium: Etihad Stadium; Attendance: 52,126; Referee: Simon Hooper

=== EFL Cup ===
Newcastle entered the EFL Cup in the third round, and were drawn at home against Manchester City. They were then drawn away to Manchester United in the fourth round, and away to Chelsea in the quarter-finals.

Win Draw Loss Fixtures

27 September 2023 Third round	Newcastle United	1–0	Manchester City	Newcastle upon Tyne
20:00 BST	Isak 53'; Bruno Guimarães (yellow card) 69'; Tonali (yellow card) 82'	Report	Akanji (yellow card) 65'; Phillips (yellow card) 66'	Stadium: St James' Park; Attendance: 51,692; Referee: Chris Kavanagh
Note: Live on Sky Sports

1 November 2023 Fourth round	Manchester United	0–3	Newcastle United	Manchester
20:15 GMT	Mejbri (yellow card) 14'; Casemiro (yellow card) 19'; Reguilón (yellow card) 77'; Amrabat (yellow card) 79'	Report	Almirón 28'; Hall 36'; Willock (yellow card) 46', (goal) 60'; Joelinton (yellow card) 82'	Stadium: Old Trafford; Attendance: 72,484; Referee: Robert Jones
Note: Live on Sky Sports

19 December 2023 Quarter-finals	Chelsea	1–1 (4–2 p)	Newcastle United	Fulham
20:00 GMT	Caicedo (yellow card) 2'; Sterling (yellow card) 71'; Mudryk 90+2', (yellow card) 90+5'; Gallagher (yellow card) 90+4'	Report	Wilson 16', (yellow card) 87'; Bruno Guimarães (yellow card) 90+5'	Stadium: Stamford Bridge; Attendance: 38,058; Referee: Jarred Gillett
	Penalties
	Palmer (penalty scored); Gallagher (penalty scored); Nkunku (penalty scored); Mudryk (penalty scored)		(penalty scored) Wilson; (penalty missed) Trippier; (penalty scored) Bruno Guimarães; (penalty missed) Ritchie
Note: Live on Sky Sports

=== UEFA Champions League ===
==== Group stage ====
In their first appearance in the Champions League in twenty years, Newcastle United were drawn into Group F, considered the "group of death" in this year's competition, alongside Paris Saint-Germain, Borussia Dortmund and AC Milan.

Pos	Team	Pld	W	D	L	GF	GA	GD	Pts	Qualification	DOR	PAR	MIL	NEW
1	(Germany) Borussia Dortmund	6	3	2	1	7	4	+3	11	Advance to knockout phase	—	1–1	0–0	2–0
2	(France) Paris Saint-Germain	6	2	2	2	9	8	+1	8 (Note: Tied on head-to-head points. Head-to-head goal difference: Paris Saint-Germain +2, Milan −2.)	Advance to knockout phase	2–0	—	3–0	1–1
3	(Italy) Milan	6	2	2	2	5	8	−3	8	Transfer to Europa League	1–3	2–1	—	0–0
4	(England) Newcastle United	6	1	2	3	6	7	−1	5		0–1	4–1	1–2	—

Source: UEFA
Rules for classification: Group stage tiebreakers
Notes:

Win Draw Loss Fixtures

19 September 2023 1	Milan (Italy)	0–0	(England) Newcastle United	Milan, Italy
18:45 CEST	Calabria (yellow card) 40'; Musah (yellow card) 82'; Giroud (yellow card) 83'; Krunić (yellow card) 89'	Report	Schär (yellow card) 49'	Stadium: San Siro; Attendance: 65,695; Referee: José María Sánchez Martínez (Spain)
Note: Live on TNT Sports

4 October 2023 2	Newcastle United (England)	4–1	(France) Paris Saint-Germain	Newcastle upon Tyne
20:00 BST	Almirón 17'; Burn 39'; Bruno Guimarães (yellow card) 45+7'; Longstaff 50'; Gordon (yellow card) 70'; Pope (yellow card) 87'; Schär 90+1'	Report	Hernandez (yellow card) 38', (goal) 56'; Hakimi (yellow card) 43'; Dembélé (yellow card) 67'; Zaïre-Emery (yellow card) 81'	Stadium: St James' Park; Attendance: 52,009; Referee: István Kovács (Romania)
Note: Live on TNT Sports

25 October 2023 3	Newcastle United (England)	0–1	(Germany) Borussia Dortmund	Newcastle upon Tyne
20:00 BST	Bruno Guimarães (yellow card) 79'	Report	Wolf (yellow card) 35'; Nmecha 45'	Stadium: St James' Park; Attendance: 52,024; Referee: Artur Soares Dias (Portugal)
Note: Live on TNT Sports

7 November 2023 4	Borussia Dortmund (Germany)	2–0	(England) Newcastle United	Dortmund, Germany
18:45 CET	Füllkrug 26'; Brandt 79'	Report	Hall (yellow card) 9'	Stadium: Signal Iduna Park; Attendance: 81,365; Referee: Alejandro Hernández Hernández (Spain)
Note: Live on TNT Sports

28 November 2023 5	Paris Saint-Germain (France)	1–1	(England) Newcastle United	Paris, France
21:00 CET	Ugarte (yellow card) 36'; Lee (yellow card) 54'; Dembélé (yellow card) 58'; Škriniar (yellow card) 60'; Donnarumma (yellow card) 72'; Ramos (yellow card) 90+5'; Mbappé 90+8' (pen.)	Report	Joelinton (yellow card) 22'; Isak 24'; Almirón (yellow card) 83'; Pope (yellow card) 90+1'	Stadium: Parc des Princes; Attendance: 46,435; Referee: Szymon Marciniak (Poland)
Note: Live on TNT Sports

13 December 2023 6	Newcastle United (England)	1–2	(Italy) Milan	Newcastle upon Tyne
20:00 GMT	Joelinton 33', (yellow card) 72'; Schär (yellow card) 90+5'	Report	Leão (yellow card) 40'; Maignan (yellow card) 45+1'; Pulisic 59'; Jović (yellow card) 75'; Musah (yellow card) 80'; Chukwueze 84'; Florenzi (yellow card) 90'	Stadium: St James' Park; Attendance: 52,037; Referee: Danny Makkelie (Netherlands)
Note: Live on TNT Sports

== Statistics ==
=== Appearances and goals ===
Last updated on 11 May 2024.

No.	Pos	Nat	Player	Total		Premier League		FA Cup		EFL Cup		UEFA Champions League	
No.	Pos	Nat	Player	Apps	Goals	Apps	Goals	Apps	Goals	Apps	Goals	Apps	Goals
Goalkeepers
1	GK	(Slovakia) SVK	Martin Dúbravka	29	0	21+1	0	4	0	2	0	1	0
18	GK	(Germany) GER	Loris Karius	1	0	1	0	0	0	0	0	0	0
22	GK	(England) ENG	Nick Pope	20	0	14	0	0	0	1	0	5	0
Defenders
2	DF	(England) ENG	Kieran Trippier	37	1	25+1	1	3	0	0+2	0	6	0
3	DF	(Wales) WAL	Paul Dummett	7	0	0+4	0	0+1	0	2	0	0	0
4	DF	(Netherlands) NED	Sven Botman	22	2	15+2	2	3	0	1	0	1	0
5	DF	(Switzerland) SUI	Fabian Schär	45	5	34	4	4	0	0+1	0	6	1
6	DF	(England) ENG	Jamaal Lascelles	26	1	13+3	1	2+1	0	2	0	5	0
13	DF	(England) ENG	Matt Targett	7	0	1+2	0	0	0	2	0	0+2	0
17	DF	(Sweden) SWE	Emil Krafth	19	0	6+9	0	0+2	0	2	0	0	0
20	DF	(England) ENG	Lewis Hall	20	1	6+10	0	0+1	0	2	1	1	0
21	DF	(England) ENG	Tino Livramento	35	1	12+14	1	0+3	0	3	0	3	0
33	DF	(England) ENG	Dan Burn	41	4	29+2	2	4	1	0+2	0	3+1	1
54	DF	(Republic of Ireland) IRL	Alex Murphy	2	0	0+2	0	0	0	0	0	0	0
Midfielders
7	MF	(Brazil) BRA	Joelinton	25	3	14+4	2	1	0	2	0	4	1
8	MF	(Italy) ITA	Sandro Tonali	12	1	5+3	1	0	0	1	0	2+1	0
10	MF	(England) ENG	Anthony Gordon	47	12	33+1	11	4	1	2+1	0	5+1	0
11	MF	(Scotland) SCO	Matt Ritchie	17	1	0+13	1	0+2	0	1+1	0	0	0
15	MF	(England) ENG	Harvey Barnes	21	5	6+13	5	0+1	0	0	0	0+1	0
23	MF	(England) ENG	Jacob Murphy	26	2	12+7	2	3	0	1	0	1+2	0
24	MF	(Paraguay) PAR	Miguel Almirón	43	5	23+8	3	1+2	0	1+2	1	4+2	1
28	MF	(England) ENG	Joe Willock	14	2	5+4	1	2	0	1	1	1+1	0
32	MF	(Scotland) SCO	Elliot Anderson	24	0	9+10	0	0+2	0	0+1	0	0+2	0
36	MF	(England) ENG	Sean Longstaff	44	8	28+5	6	4	1	2	0	4+1	1
39	MF	(Brazil) BRA	Bruno Guimarães	48	7	35	7	4	0	1+2	0	6	0
40	MF	(England) ENG	Joe White	4	0	0+4	0	0	0	0	0	0	0
49	MF	(England) ENG	Amadou Diallo	1	0	0+1	0	0	0	0	0	0	0
67	MF	(England) ENG	Lewis Miley	26	1	14+3	1	1+3	0	2	0	2+1	0
Forwards
9	FW	(England) ENG	Callum Wilson	25	10	9+10	9	0	0	1+1	1	2+2	0
14	FW	(Sweden) SWE	Alexander Isak	38	25	25+3	21	4	2	1	1	4+1	1
63	FW	(England) ENG	Ben Parkinson	1	0	0+1	0	0	0	0	0	0	0
Player(s) who left on loan but featured this season
55	FW	(England) ENG	Michael Ndiweni	1	0	0+1	0	0	0	0	0	0	0
Player(s) who left permanently but featured this season
