= Ndiweni =

Ndiweni is a surname. Notable people with the surname include:

- Khayisa Ndiweni (1913–2010), Zimbabwean chief
- Michael Ndiweni (born 2003), English footballer
- Nicolle Ndiweni (born 1988/1989), English Police and Crime Commissioner
