= 2025–26 Falkirk F.C. season =

Falkirk
2025–26 season
- CEO: Jamie Swinney
- Manager: John McGlynn
- Stadium: Falkirk Stadium
- Premiership: Sixth place
- Scottish Cup: Semi-finals
- League Cup: Second round
- Stirlingshire Cup: Winners
- Top goalscorer: League: Barney Stewart (8); All: Barney Stewart (12)
- Highest home attendance: 7,750 vs. Rangers, Premiership, 12 April 2026
- Lowest home attendance: 2,312 vs. The Spartans, League Cup, 26 July 2025
- Average home league attendance: 7,546
Home colours	Away colours

The 2025–26 season was Falkirk's first season back in the top flight of Scottish Football, the Scottish Premiership, following their promotion from the Championship at the end of the 2024–25 season that led to returning to the top flight of Scottish football for the first time since 2010.

Falkirk also competed in the League Cup, Scottish Cup and the Stirlingshire Cup.

== Results and fixtures ==
=== Pre-season ===
28 June 2025 Friendly	Falkirk	2–3	Edinburgh City	Falkirk
14:00	Arfield 51'; Mackie 55'		Daramola 17', 25'; Trialist 31'	Stadium: Falkirk Stadium

1 July 2025 Friendly	East Fife	2–4	Falkirk	Methil
19:30	Trouten 29'; Nicol 70'	Report	Miller 39' (pen.); Spencer 40'; Nesbitt 60'; Arfield 77' (pen.)	Stadium: Bayview Stadium

5 July 2025 Friendly	Falkirk	4–2	Raith Rovers	Falkirk
14:00	Ross 41'; Graham 59'; Spencer 80'; MacIver 83'	Raith Report	Vaughan 36'; Doherty 69'	Stadium: Falkirk Stadium; Attendance: 1,204; Referee: Ross Hardie

8 July 2025 Friendly	St Johnstone	0–1	Falkirk	Perth
19:30		Report	Arfield 9'	Stadium: McDiarmid Park; Attendance: 2,004; Referee: Greg Soutar

=== Scottish Premiership ===
3 August 2025 1	Falkirk	2–2	Dundee United	Falkirk
14:00	Tait 50'; Ross 73'	Report	Watters 40'; Dolček 71'	Stadium: Falkirk Stadium; Attendance: 7,624; Referee: John Beaton

9 August 2025 2	Livingston	3–1	Falkirk	Livingston
15:00	Pittman 18'; Smith 45+3'; Bokila 88'	Report	MacIver 74'	Stadium: Almondvale Stadium; Attendance: 3,316; Referee: Chris Graham

31 August 2025 3	Aberdeen	0–1	Falkirk	Aberdeen
15:00	Devlin (red card) 43'	Report	Wilson 75'	Stadium: Pittodrie Stadium; Attendance: 18,380; Referee: Ross Hardie

13 September 2025 4	Falkirk	1–2	St Mirren	Falkirk
15:00	Graham 88'	Report	John 64'; Mandron 81'	Stadium: Falkirk Stadium; Attendance: 7,460; Referee: Duncan Nicolson

23 September 2025 5	Falkirk	2–2	Hibernian	Falkirk
19:45	MacIver 45+1'; Henderson 64'	Report	Boyle 30' (pen.); McGrath 42'	Stadium: Falkirk Stadium; Attendance: 7,491; Referee: Calum Scott
Note: Match postponed due to Hibernian's european fixture.

27 September 2025 6	Heart of Midlothian	3–0	Falkirk	Edinburgh
15:00	Kyziridis 22'; Shankland 41'; Halkett 48'	Report		Stadium: Tynecastle Park; Attendance: 18,919; Referee: Lloyd Wilson

5 October 2025 7	Falkirk	1–1	Rangers	Falkirk
15:00	Cartwright 73'	Report	Miovski 41'	Stadium: Falkirk Stadium; Attendance: 7,652; Referee: Matthew MacDermid

18 October 2025 8	Motherwell	1–2	Falkirk	Motherwell
15:00	Maswanhise 22'	Report	Miller 57'; Arfield 79'	Stadium: Fir Park; Attendance: 7,473; Referee: Steven McLean

25 October 2025 9	Falkirk	2–1	Dundee	Falkirk
15:00	Robertson 55' (o.g.); Allan 89'	Report	Robertson 26'	Stadium: Falkirk Stadium; Attendance: 7,652; Referee: Ross Hardie

29 October 2025 10	Celtic	4–0	Falkirk	Glasgow
19:45	Kenny 30', 40'; Nygren 58'; Tounekti 73'	Report		Stadium: Celtic Park; Referee: Ryan Lee

1 November 2025 11	Falkirk	3–1	Kilmarnock	Falkirk
15:00	Williams 7'; MacIver 22'; Miller 38'	Report	John-Jules 69'	Stadium: Falkirk Stadium; Attendance: 7,461; Referee: David Dickinson

8 November 2025 12	Falkirk	1–1	Livingston	Falkirk
15:00	Graham 16' (pen.)	Report	Wilson 89'	Stadium: Falkirk Stadium; Attendance: 7,176; Referee: Grant Irvine

22 November 2025 13	Dundee United	0–3	Falkirk	Dundee
15:00		Report	Miller 3'; Kucherenko 22' (o.g.); Graham 63'	Stadium: Tannadice Park; Attendance: 9,736; Referee: Nick Walsh

30 November 2025 14	Rangers	0–0	Falkirk	Glasgow
14:00		Report		Stadium: Ibrox Stadium; Attendance: 50,288; Referee: Steven McLean

3 December 2025 15	Falkirk	0–0	Motherwell	Falkirk
15:00		Report		Stadium: Falkirk Stadium; Attendance: 7,490; Referee: Chris Graham

6 December 2025 16	Hibernian	3–0	Falkirk	Edinburgh
15:00	Boyle 36' (pen.); Bowie 41', 80'	Report		Stadium: Easter Road; Attendance: 18,951; Referee: Matthew MacDermid

13 December 2025 17	Falkirk	0–2	Heart of Midlothian	Falkirk
20:00		Report	Braga 2'; Kingsley 77'	Stadium: Falkirk Stadium; Attendance: 7,538; Referee: Calum Scott

20 December 2025 18	Kilmarnock	0–1	Falkirk	Kilmarnock
15:00		Report	Graham 54'	Stadium: Rugby Park; Attendance: 5,708; Referee: Ryan Lee

27 December 2025 19	Dundee	1–0	Falkirk	Dundee
15:00	Dhanda 45+5' (pen.); Murray (red card) 87'	Report		Stadium: Dens Park; Attendance: 5,798; Referee: Steven McLean

3 January 2026 20	Falkirk	1–0	Aberdeen	Falkirk
15:00	Lissah 58'	Report		Stadium: Falkirk Stadium; Attendance: 7,710; Referee: John Beaton

10 January 2026 21	St Mirren	0–2	Falkirk	Paisley
15:00		Report	Yeats 55'; Miller 61'	Stadium: St Mirren Park; Attendance: 7,062; Referee: Steven McLean

14 January 2026 22	Falkirk	0–1	Celtic	Falkirk
19:45		Report	Nygren 43'	Stadium: Falkirk Stadium; Attendance: 7,730; Referee: John Beaton & Sean Murdoch

24 January 2026 23	Falkirk	4–1	Hibernian	Falkirk
15:00	Stewart 17', 43', 83'; Hanley 89' (o.g.)	Report	Bushiri 59'	Stadium: Falkirk Stadium; Attendance: 7,617; Referee: Don Robertson

1 February 2026 24	Celtic	2–0	Falkirk	Glasgow
15:00	Čvančara 39'; Nygren 62'	Report		Stadium: Celtic Park; Attendance: 58,450; Referee: David Dickinson

4 February 2026 25	Livingston	1–2	Falkirk	Livingston
19:45	McLennan 47'	Report	Wilson 6'; Marsh 25'	Stadium: Almondvale Stadium; Attendance: 2,790; Referee: Matthew MacDermid

11 February 2026 26	Falkirk	1–0	Dundee	Falkirk
19:45	Broggio 55'	Report		Stadium: Falkirk Stadium; Attendance: 7,345; Referee: David Dickinson

14 February 2026 27	Falkirk	2–3	Dundee United	Falkirk
15:00	Broggio 17'; Lissah 53'; Henderson (red card) 69'	Report	Graham 24'; Sibbald 55'; Eskesen 83'	Stadium: Falkirk Stadium; Attendance: 7,696; Referee: Ryan Lee

21 February 2026 28	Heart of Midlothian	1–0	Falkirk	Edinburgh
15:00	Chesnokov 45'	Report		Stadium: Tynecastle Park; Attendance: 18,820; Referee: Duncan Nicolson

28 February 2026 29	Falkirk	5–1	Kilmarnock	Falkirk
15:00	Brown 1' (o.g.); Tait 28', 56'; Stewart 36', 50'	Report	Kiltie 40'	Stadium: Falkirk Stadium; Attendance: 7,646; Referee: Colin Steven

14 March 2026 30	Aberdeen	1–1	Falkirk	Aberdeen
15:00	Nisbet 73'	Report	Stewart 89'	Stadium: Pittodrie Stadium; Attendance: 17,562; Referee: Calum Scott

21 March 2026 31	Falkirk	1–2	St Mirren	Falkirk
15:00	Stewart 15'	Report	Freckleton 18'; Donnelly 63'	Stadium: Falkirk Stadium; Attendance: 7,526; Referee: Ross Hardie

4 April 2026 32	Motherwell	2–3	Falkirk	Motherwell
15:00	Watt 34'; Maswanhise 90+4'	Report	Stewart 3'; Broggio 45'; Miller 62' (pen.)	Stadium: Fir Park; Referee: Duncan Nicolson

12 April 2026 33	Falkirk	3–6	Rangers	Falkirk
12:00	Broggio 6'; Yeats 26'; Miller 70' (pen.)	Report	Chukwuani 42'; Chermiti 47', 74'; Raskin 52'; Miovski 58', 88'	Stadium: Falkirk Stadium; Attendance: 7,750; Referee: Don Robertson

25 April 2026 34	Celtic	3–1	Falkirk	Glasgow
17:30	Maeda 30', 83'; Tierney 44'	Report	Wilson 70'	Stadium: Celtic Park; Referee: Ryan Lee

2 May 2026 35	Falkirk	1–0	Motherwell	Falkirk
15:00	Cartwright 63'	Report		Stadium: Falkirk Stadium; Attendance: 7,566; Referee: Dan McFarlane

9 May 2026 36	Falkirk	1–3	Hibernian	Falkirk
15:00	Broggio 72'	Report	Campbell 3', 20'; Obita 40'	Stadium: Falkirk Stadium; Attendance: 7,644; Referee: Ryan Lee

13 May 2026 37	Heart of Midlothian	3–0	Falkirk	Edinburgh
19:45	Kent 29'; Devlin 34'; Spittal 86'	Report		Stadium: Tynecastle Park; Attendance: 18,861; Referee: Nick Walsh

16 May 2026 38	Falkirk	2–5	Rangers	Falkirk
12:30	Butland 7' (o.g.); Miller 44' (pen.)	Report	Chermiti 2', 6', 47'; Gassama 27'; Aasgaard 79' (pen.)	Stadium: Falkirk Stadium; Attendance: 7,148; Referee: Duncan Nicolson

=== Scottish Cup ===
17 January 2026 Fourth round	Heart of Midlothian	1–1 (4–5 p)	Falkirk	Tynecastle Park
20:00	Shankland 86' (pen.)	Report	Parkinson 59'	Attendance: 17,109; Referee: Nick Walsh
	Penalties
	Spittal (penalty scored); Kyziridis (penalty scored); Kaboré (penalty scored); Kabangu (penalty missed); Milne (penalty scored)		Spencer (penalty scored); Henderson (penalty scored); Graham (penalty scored); Tait (penalty scored); Parkinson (penalty scored)

8 February 2026 Fifth round	Stenhousemuir	0–2 (a.e.t.)	Falkirk	Ochilview Park
19:30		Report	Spencer 104'; Stewart 108'	Attendance: 2,514; Referee: Duncan Nicolson

6 March 2026 Quarter-finals	Falkirk	2–1	Dundee United	Falkirk Stadium
19:45	Stewart 10'; Yeats 21'	Report	Eskesen 45+2'	Attendance: 7,151; Referee: Steven McLean

18 April 2026 Semi-finals	Dunfermline Athletic	0–0 (4–2 p)	Falkirk	Hampden Park
12:30		Report	Cartwright (red card) 120+1'	Attendance: 25,237; Referee: John Beaton

=== Scottish League Cup ===
==== Group stage ====
12 July 2025 1	Brechin City	0–7	Falkirk	Brechin
15:00		Report	Arfield 18', 34' (pen.); Tait 27', 77', 83'; Agyeman 30'; MacIver 90+1'	Stadium: Glebe Park; Attendance: 1,003; Referee: Dan McFarlane

19 July 2025 2	Cove Rangers	0–0 (2–4 p)	Falkirk	Cove Bay
15:00		Report		Stadium: Balmoral Stadium; Attendance: 811; Referee: Grant Irvine

22 July 2025 3	Falkirk	3–1	Queen's Park	Falkirk
19:45	Ross 42', 51'; Graham 86'	Report	Fowler 14'	Stadium: Falkirk Stadium; Attendance: 2,387; Referee: Nick Walsh

26 July 2025 4	Falkirk	4–0	The Spartans	Falkirk
15:00	Tait 23'; Arfield 52'; Miller 55', 76'	Report		Stadium: Falkirk Stadium; Attendance: 2,312; Referee: David Dickinson

==== Knockout phase ====
15 August 2025 Second round	Celtic	4–1	Falkirk	Glasgow
19:45	Maeda 26'; Johnston 54'; Murray 61'; Henderson 64' (o.g.)	Report	Adams 67'	Stadium: Celtic Park; Attendance: 46,063; Referee: Lloyd Wilson

=== Stirlingshire Cup ===
21 June 2025 Stirlingshire Cup	Falkirk	0–0 (5–4 p)	Alloa Athletic	Falkirk
10:00				Stadium: Falkirk Stadium

21 June 2025 Stirlingshire Cup	Falkirk	2–0	East Stirlingshire	Falkirk
14:00	Stewart 4', 32'			Stadium: Falkirk Stadium

24 June 2025 Stirlingshire Cup	Falkirk	3–1	Stenhousemuir	Falkirk
19:45	Agyeman 3'; MacIver 39'; Graham 67'		Trialist 63'	Stadium: Falkirk Stadium

== Squad statistics ==
As of 16 May 2026

No.	Pos	Nat	Player	Total		Premiership		Scottish Cup		League Cup		Stirlingshire Cup	
No.	Pos	Nat	Player	Apps	Goals	Apps	Goals	Apps	Goals	Apps	Goals	Apps	Goals
1	GK	(Scotland) SCO	Nicky Hogarth	12	0	6+1	0	0+0	0	2+0	0	3+0	0
2	DF	(Scotland) SCO	Keelan Adams	31	1	22+1	0	1+1	0	4+0	1	2+0	0
3	DF	(Scotland) SCO	Leon McCann	36	0	25+1	0	4+0	0	3+0	0	3+0	0
5	DF	(Scotland) SCO	Liam Henderson	43	1	32+1	1	3+0	0	5+0	0	2+0	0
6	DF	(Scotland) SCO	Coll Donaldson	12	0	6+4	0	2+0	0	0+0	0	0+0	0
7	FW	(Scotland) SCO	Brian Graham	35	6	7+17	4	1+2	0	3+2	1	3+0	1
8	MF	(Scotland) SCO	Brad Spencer	48	1	36+1	0	4+0	1	5+0	0	2+0	0
9	FW	(Scotland) SCO	Ross MacIver	20	5	9+3	3	0+0	0	2+3	1	3+0	1
11	MF	(England) ENG	Ben Broggio	17	5	12+2	5	3+0	0	0+0	0	0+0	0
12	GK	(Scotland) SCO	Jamie Sneddon	0	0	0+0	0	0+0	0	0+0	0	0+0	0
14	MF	(Scotland) SCO	Finn Yeats	26	3	17+3	2	3+0	1	0+0	0	2+1	0
15	DF	(Scotland) SCO	Lewis Neilson	24	0	14+2	0	1+2	0	5+0	0	0+0	0
16	FW	(Scotland) SCO	Barney Stewart	23	12	17+0	8	3+1	2	0+0	0	1+1	2
17	MF	(England) ENG	Henry Cartwright	42	2	11+23	2	1+2	0	2+3	0	0+0	0
18	FW	(Scotland) SCO	Gary Oliver	10	0	0+5	0	0+0	0	0+3	0	2+0	0
19	GK	(Scotland) SCO	Scott Bain	40	0	32+0	0	4+0	0	3+0	0	1+0	0
20	MF	(Scotland) SCO	Connor Allan	33	1	20+4	1	2+1	0	1+3	0	2+0	0
21	MF	(Scotland) SCO	Dylan Tait	49	7	32+5	3	4+0	0	4+1	4	2+1	0
22	FW	(England) ENG	Kyrell Wilson	32	3	18+10	3	0+4	0	0+0	0	0+0	0
23	MF	(Scotland) SCO	Ethan Ross	38	3	7+22	1	0+3	0	2+2	2	2+0	0
24	FW	(England) ENG	Ethan Williams	24	1	11+12	1	0+1	0	0+0	0	0+0	0
25	DF	(England) ENG	Ryan Edwards	4	0	0+4	0	0+0	0	0+0	0	0+0	0
27	FW	(England) ENG	Ben Parkinson	11	1	1+8	0	0+2	1	0+0	0	0+0	0
28	DF	(England) ENG	Filip Lissah	31	2	26+1	2	3+1	0	0+0	0	0+0	0
29	MF	(Scotland) SCO	Calvin Miller	50	8	36+2	6	4+0	0	5+0	2	2+1	0
30	FW	(England) ENG	Louie Marsh	8	1	4+3	1	0+1	0	0+0	0	0+0	0
42	DF	(England) ENG	Sam Hart	8	0	4+4	0	0+0	0	0+0	0	0+0	0
47	FW	(Belgium) BEL	Trey Samuel-Ogunsuyi	9	0	2+7	0	0+0	0	0+0	0	0+0	0
Players who left the club during the 2025–26 season
4	DF	(Scotland) SCO	Tom Lang	2	0	0+0	0	0+0	0	0+0	0	2+0	0
10	MF	(Scotland) SCO	Aidan Nesbitt	12	0	1+3	0	0+1	0	1+4	0	2+0	0
11	FW	(Ghana) GHA	Alfredo Agyeman	27	2	2+18	0	0+0	0	3+2	1	2+0	1
26	DF	(Scotland) SCO	Sean Mackie	5	0	0+1	0	0+0	0	2+0	0	2+0	0
32	MF	(Scotland) SCO	Rhys Walker	2	0	0+0	0	0+0	0	0+0	0	2+0	0
27	GK	(Scotland) SCO	Owen Hayward	0	0	0+0	0	0+0	0	0+0	0	0+0	0
33	MF	(Scotland) SCO	Flynn McCafferty	0	0	0+0	0	0+0	0	0+0	0	0+0	0
34	FW	(Scotland) SCO	Caelan McCrone	1	0	0+0	0	0+0	0	0+0	0	1+0	0
37	MF	(Canada) CAN	Scott Arfield	20	4	3+11	1	0+0	0	3+2	3	0+1	0

== Season statistics ==
=== League table ===
Pos	Team	Pld	W	D	L	GF	GA	GD	Pts	Qualification or relegation (Note: Teams played each other three times (33 matches), before the league was split into two groups (the top six and the bottom six).)
4	Motherwell	38	16	13	9	59	36	+23	61	Qualification for the Conference League second qualifying round (Note: Since the 2025–26 Scottish Cup winners, Celtic, qualified for the Champions League via league position, the spot reserved for the cup winners (Europa League third qualifying round) was passed to the third-placed team, and the spots for the Conference League second qualifying round were moved down one league position.)
5	Hibernian	38	15	12	11	58	44	+14	57	Qualification for the Conference League second qualifying round
6	Falkirk	38	14	7	17	50	62	−12	49	
7	Dundee United	38	10	15	13	49	60	−11	45	
8	Dundee	38	11	9	18	42	61	−19	42	

Rules for classification: 1) Points; 2) Goal difference; 3) Goals scored; 4) Head-to-head points; 5) Head-to-head goal difference; 6) Play-off (only if deciding champion, UEFA competition qualification, second stage group allocation, or relegation).

=== League cup table ===
Pos	Team	Pld	W	PW	PL	L	GF	GA	GD	Pts	Qualification	FAL	COV	QPA	SPA	BRE
1	Falkirk	4	3	1	0	0	14	1	+13	11	Qualification for the second round	—	—	3–1	4–0	—
2	Cove Rangers	4	2	0	1	1	5	2	+3	7		0–0p	—	—	1–0	—
3	Queen's Park	4	2	0	0	2	9	6	+3	6		—	2–1	—	—	5–0
4	The Spartans	4	2	0	0	2	4	6	−2	6		—	—	2–1	—	2–0
5	Brechin City	4	0	0	0	4	0	17	−17	0		0–7	0–3	—	—	—

Rules for classification: 1) goal difference, 2) goals scored, 3) away goals scored, 4) matches won, 5) away matches won, 6) drawing of lots.

== Transfers ==
=== Players in ===
Player	From	Fee
(Scotland) Scott Bain	(Scotland) Celtic	Free
(Scotland) Brian Graham	(Scotland) Partick Thistle	Free
(England) Ryan Edwards	(India) Chennaiyin	Free
(England) Ben Parkinson	(England) Newcastle United	Undisclosed

=== Players out ===
Player	To	Fee
(Scotland) Jordan Allan	(Scotland) Queen of the South	Free
(Scotland) Scott Honeyman	(Scotland) Dumbarton	Free
(Scotland) Ross Munro	(Scotland) Inverness CT	Free
(Scotland) Logan Sinclair	(Scotland) Gretna 2008	Free
(Scotland) Owen Hayward	(Scotland) Tranent	Free
(Canada) Scott Arfield	(Scotland) Livingston	Free

=== Loans in ===
Player	To	Fee
(Scotland) Lewis Neilson	(Scotland) Heart of Midlothian	Loan
(England) Henry Cartwright	(England) Leicester City	Loan
(England) Kyrell Wilson	(Wales) Swansea City	Loan
(Belgium) Trey Samuel-Ogunsuyi	(England) Sunderland	Loan
(England) Ethan Williams	(England) Manchester United	Loan
(England) Filip Lissah	(Wales) Swansea City	Loan
(England) Sam Hart	(England) Port Vale	Loan
(England) Louie Marsh	(England) Sheffield United	Loan
(England) Ben Broggio	(England) Aston Villa	Loan

=== Loans out ===
Player	To	Fee
(Scotland) Owen Hayward	(Scotland) Cowdenbeath	Loan
(Scotland) Flynn McCafferty	(Scotland) Bo'ness United	Loan
(Scotland) Rhys Walker	(Scotland) Cowdenbeath	Loan
(Scotland) Caelan McCrone	(England) Berwick Rangers	Loan
(Scotland) Barney Stewart	(Scotland) Dunfermline Athletic	Loan
(Scotland) Sean Mackie	(Scotland) Ross County	Loan
(Ghana) Alfredo Agyeman	(Scotland) St Johnstone	Loan
(Scotland) Tom Lang	(Scotland) Arbroath	Loan
(Scotland) Aidan Nesbitt	(Scotland) Arbroath	Loan

== See also ==
- List of Falkirk F.C. seasons
