= Henry Cartwright (footballer) =

English footballer (born 2004)

Personal information
- Full name: Henry John Cartwright
- Date of birth: 11 December 2004 (age 21)
- Height: 5 ft 9 in (1.75 m)
- Position: Defensive midfielder

Team information
- Current team: Bradford City
- Number: 20

Youth career
- –2025: Leicester City

Senior career*
Years	Team	Apps	(Gls)
2025–2026	Leicester City	0	(0)
2025–2026	→ Falkirk (loan)	34	(2)
2026–	Bradford City	4	(0)
- * Club domestic league appearances and goals as of 7 November 2026

Henry John Cartwright (born 11 December 2004) is an English professional footballer who plays as a defensive midfielder for EFL League One club Bradford City.

== Career ==
A product of the Leicester City academy, Cartwright first joined the club at Under-9s level. He signed a new contract with the club in the Summer of 2025.

On 11 July 2025, Cartwright signed for Scottish Premiership club Falkirk on a season-long loan. He made his professional debut the day after, coming on as a substitute for Liam Henderson in the 67th minute of a 7–0 away win against Highland Football League club Brechin City in the group stage of the Scottish League Cup. He made his league debut on 3 August, coming on as a substitute for Dylan Tait in the 79th minute of a 2–2 draw at home in the Scottish Premiership.

On 3 July 2026, Cartwright joined League One side Bradford City for an undisclosed fee.

== Career statistics ==
As of match played 9 May 2026

Appearances and goals by club, season and competition
Club	Season	League			National Cup		League Cup		Other		Total	
Club	Season	Division	Apps	Goals	Apps	Goals	Apps	Goals	Apps	Goals	Apps	Goals
Leicester City U21	2022–23	—			—		—		2 (Note: Appearances in EFL Trophy)	0	2	0
Leicester City U21	2023–24	—			—		—		3	0	3	0
Leicester City U21	2024–25	—			—		—		3	0	3	0
Leicester City U21	Total		—		—		—		8	0	8	0
Falkirk (loan)	2025–26	Scottish Premiership	32	2	3	0	5	0	—		40	2
Career total			32	2	3	0	5	0	8	0	48	2
