= Amadou Diallo (footballer, born 2003) =

English footballer (born 2003)

Personal information
- Date of birth: 15 February 2003 (age 23)
- Place of birth: Canning Town, England
- Height: 1.73 m (5 ft 8 in)
- Position: Winger

Team information
- Current team: Skënderbeu
- Number: 11

Youth career
- 2013–2022: West Ham United
- 2022–2023: Newcastle United

Senior career*
| Years | Team | Apps | (Gls) |
| 2023–2024 | Newcastle United | 1 | (0) |
| 2024–2025 | Bordeaux | 23 | (0) |
| 2025 | Bordeaux B | 1 | (0) |
| 2025–2026 | Oliveirense | 18 | (0) |
| 2026– | Skënderbeu | 4 | (0) |

International career^{‡}
| 2017 | England U15 | 2 | (0) |
| 2018–2019 | England U16 | 10 | (2) |
| 2019–2020 | England U17 | 7 | (3) |
- * Club domestic league appearances and goals as of 19 September 2026 ‡ National team caps and goals as of 17:23 1 November 2023 (UTC)

Amadou Diallo (born 15 February 2003) is an English professional footballer who plays as a winger for Albanian Kategoria Superiore club Skënderbeu. He represented England internationally from an under-15 to an under-17 level.

== Club career ==
=== West Ham United ===
Diallo joined the West Ham Academy when he was ten-years old, and he signed his first professional contract with the club in 2020. However, he parted ways with the club in 2022.

=== Newcastle United ===
In October 2022, Diallo joined the Newcastle United Academy. His first competitive involvement with the senior team came when he featured as an unused substitute in a 3–0 away win over Manchester United in the EFL Cup on 1 November 2023. He made his competitive first–team debut on 25 November 2023 in a Premier League home win against Chelsea, being substituted on in the closing stages of the match.

On 29 May 2024, the club announced he would be leaving in the summer when his contract expired.

=== Bordeaux ===
On 12 September 2024, Diallo joined Championnat National 2 club Bordeaux.

In July 2025, Diallo joined Liga Portugal 2 side Oliveirense.

== Career statistics ==
=== Club ===
As of match played 7 December 2024

Appearances and goals by club, season and competition
| Club | Season | League | | | National cup (Note: Includes FA Cup, Coupe de France) | | League cup (Note: Includes EFL Cup) | | Continental | | Other | | Total | |
| Club | Season | Division | Apps | Goals | Apps | Goals | Apps | Goals | Apps | Goals | Apps | Goals | Apps | Goals |
|---|---|---|---|---|---|---|---|---|---|---|---|---|---|---|
| West Ham U21 | 2021–22 | — | | | — | | — | | — | | 1 (Note: Appearance(s) in EFL Trophy) | 0 | 1 | 0 |
| Newcastle United U21 | 2023–24 | — | | | — | | — | | — | | 2 | 0 | 2 | 0 |
| Newcastle United | 2023–24 | Premier League | 1 | 0 | 0 | 0 | 0 | 0 | 0 | 0 | — | | 1 | 0 |
| Bordeaux | 2024-25 | National 2 | 7 | 0 | 2 | 0 | — | | — | | — | | 9 | 0 |
| Career total | | | 8 | 0 | 2 | 0 | 0 | 0 | 0 | 0 | 3 | 0 | 13 | 0 |
