= Ben Broggio =

English footballer (born 2007)

Personal information
- Full name: Benjamin David Broggio
- Date of birth: 29 January 2007 (age 19)
- Place of birth: Sutton Coldfield, England
- Height: 5 ft 11 in (1.81 m)
- Position: Winger

Team information
- Current team: Stevenage (on loan from Aston Villa)
- Number: 27

Youth career
- –2024: Aston Villa

Senior career*
Years	Team	Apps	(Gls)
2024–	Aston Villa	0	(0)
2026	→ Falkirk (loan)	14	(5)
2026–	→ Stevenage (loan)	5	(0)

International career^{‡}
2022	England U15	4	(0)
2022	England U16	1	(0)
2024–	England U18	3	(1)
- * Club domestic league appearances and goals as of 14 October 2026 ‡ National team caps and goals as of 11:21, 10 December 2024 (UTC)

Benjamin David Broggio (born 29 January 2007) is an English professional footballer who plays as a winger for EFL League One club Stevenage, on loan from Premier League club Aston Villa.

Broggio is a product of the Aston Villa Academy, and has represented England internationally at youth levels up to under-18.

== Early life ==
Born in Sutton Coldfield, England, Broggio is of Italian heritage.

== Club career ==
=== Aston Villa ===
Broggio started his football career at the earliest levels of the Aston Villa Academy, working his way through the ranks before being awarded with his first professional contract on 2 February 2024. It was reported that Arsenal were interested in signing Broggio before his contract was signed. Broggio played in Aston Villa U18s victorious 2024-25 FA Youth Cup campaign but missed the final through injury, he earlier scored twice against Accington Stanley's youth team in a third round win.

On 24 September 2024, Broggio made his senior debut as a substitute in an EFL Cup win away to Wycombe Wanderers.

On 6 March 2025, Broggio signed a new long-term contract with Aston Villa.

==== Loan to Falkirk ====
On 2 February 2026, Broggio signed for Scottish Premiership club Falkirk on loan for the rest of the season. Broggio made his debut on 4 February, in a 2–1 away victory over Livingston. He scored his first professional goal on 11 February 2026, in a 1–0 victory over Dundee.

==== Loan to Stevenage ====
On 30 August 2026, Broggio joined EFL League One side Stevenage on a season-long loan. Broggio scored his first goal for the club on 22 September 2026, in a 6–1 victory over Walsall in the EFL Trophy.

== International career ==
Broggio has represented England at under-15, under-16, and under-18 levels.

== Career statistics ==
As of match played 10 October 2026

Appearances and goals by club, season and competition
Club	Season	League			National cup		League cup		Europe		Other		Total	
Club	Season	Division	Apps	Goals	Apps	Goals	Apps	Goals	Apps	Goals	Apps	Goals	Apps	Goals
Aston Villa U21	2023–24	—			—		—		—		3 (Note: Appearances in EFL Trophy)	0	3	0
Aston Villa U21	2024–25	—			—		—		—		1	0	1	0
Aston Villa U21	2025–26	—			—		—		—		1	1	1	1
Aston Villa U21	2026–27	—			—		—		—		1	0	1	0
Aston Villa U21	Total		0	0	0	0	0	0	0	0	6	1	6	1
Aston Villa	2024–25	Premier League	0	0	0	0	1	0	0	0	0	0	1	0
Aston Villa	2025–26	Premier League	0	0	0	0	0	0	0	0	0	0	0	0
Aston Villa	2026–27	Premier League	0	0	0	0	0	0	0	0	0	0	0	0
Aston Villa	Total		0	0	0	0	1	0	0	0	0	0	1	0
Falkirk (loan)	2025–26	Scottish Premiership	8	3	2	0	—		—		—		10	3
Stevenage (loan)	2026–27	EFL League One	5	0	0	0	—		—		2	1	7	1
Career total			13	3	2	0	1	0	0	0	8	2	24	5

== Honours ==
Aston Villa U18

- FA Youth Cup
  - Winners: 2024–25
