= Barney Stewart =

Scottish footballer

Personal information
- Full name: Barnaby Jude Columbus Stewart
- Date of birth: 7 April 2004 (age 22)
- Place of birth: London, England
- Height: 1.88 m (6 ft 2 in)
- Position: Forward

Team information
- Current team: West Bromwich Albion
- Number: 9

Youth career
- 2018–2020: Queens Park Rangers
- 2021: Hayes & Yeading United

College career
Years	Team	Apps	(Gls)
2022–2024	Heriot-Watt University		

Senior career*
Years	Team	Apps	(Gls)
2024–2026	Falkirk	33	(10)
2024	→ Heriot-Watt University (loan)		
2025	→ Dunfermline Athletic (loan)	11	(6)
2026–	West Bromwich Albion	10	(1)

International career^{‡}
2025–	Scotland U21	3	(2)
- * Club domestic league appearances and goals as of 00:08, 18 October 2026 (UTC) ‡ National team caps and goals as of 14:26, 17 June 2026 (UTC)

Barnaby Jude Columbus Stewart (born 7 April 2004) is a professional footballer who plays as a forward for EFL Championship club West Bromwich Albion. Born in England to Scottish parents, he has represented Scotland at under-21 level.

Stewart began his career with Heriot-Watt University, and has also played for Falkirk and Dunfermline Athletic.

== Youth career ==
Stewart was a trainee with Queens Park Rangers as a teenager but mainly played for local boys' clubs and school teams in West London. He also spent time with Hayes & Yeading United before going to university. He also competed in rugby union with Ealing Trailfinders' youth teams and played Gaelic football and tennis at a high level.

While considering Scottish institutions for his higher education, he impressed the staff of Heriot-Watt University (based just outside Edinburgh where his father was raised) with his performance as a stand-in for their team in a bounce match for their team against nearby club Penicuik Athletic, official fixtures having been cancelled due to bad weather which also prevented Stewart and his family from returning home as planned. He was given strong encouragement to join their Football Scholarship Programme which would include use of the facilities at the Oriam training centre and a pathway into the senior pyramid of Scottish football – albeit the Heriot-Watt University F.C. first team compete in the lower echelons of the East of Scotland Football League. Stewart accepted the offer and began his degree in Sport and Exercise Science in 2022. In football, he helped Heriot-Watt gain promotion from the EoSFL Second Division (eighth tier) to the First Division. In 2023–24 he scored over 40 times in the EoSFL and BUCS Football League competitions which drew the attention of professional clubs along with his pace and physical stature.

== Club career ==
=== Falkirk ===
In October 2024, Stewart signed for Falkirk with an understanding between all parties that completion of his degree would be prioritised alongside football, and initially this meant he was loaned back to Heriot-Watt until the end of the calendar year. He made his Falkirk debut on 11 January 2025 against Queen's Park and went on to make 16 Scottish Championship appearances (mostly as a substitute), scoring twice, as the club managed by John McGlynn won the title and were promoted to the Scottish Premiership.

Stewart sustained a broken metatarsal in July 2025, and upon recovering two months later he was loaned out to Championship side Dunfermline Athletic who had lost striker Zak Rudden to injury, the move causing discontent among some supporters of both clubs due to the rivalry between them. He soon won over the Dunfermline fans by scoring at the rate of a goal every 90 minutes, including twice in Fife derby victories over Raith Rovers, and was recalled by Falkirk at the end of 2025. His maiden Premiership appearance came against Aberdeen on 3 January 2026, and three weeks later he enhanced his growing reputation further by scoring a hat-trick as the Bairns defeated Hibernian 4–1. On 26 January he signed an extension to his Falkirk contract, running to 2028 with the option of a further year. In the second half of the season, Stewart made 17 league appearances, and scored 8 goals, receiving the SFWA Young Player of the Year award for the 2025-26 season.

=== West Bromwich Albion ===
On 17 June 2026, Stewart signed for EFL Championship club West Bromwich Albion, signing a four-year contract for a reported fee of £1,300,000. He was assigned the number 9 shirt for the club after reportedly asking directly for the number on his arrival. Stewart made his debut for the Baggies as a substitute in a 4–1 win over Rotherham United in the EFL Cup. Following two further substitute appearances in the opening two games of the league, he made his first start for the club in the following round of the Cup against Newcastle United.

== International career ==
During his productive loan with Dunfermline, Stewart was called up to the Scotland Under-21 squad, along with teammate Andy Tod, for 2027 UEFA European Under-21 Championship qualification fixtures against Gibraltar and Bulgaria in November 2025; he appeared as a substitute in both matches.

== Career statistics ==
As of match played 17 October 2026

Appearances and goals by club, season and competition
Club	Season	League			National cup (Note: Includes Scottish Cup, FA Cup)		League cup (Note: Includes Scottish League Cup, EFL Cup)		Other		Total	
Club	Season	Division	Apps	Goals	Apps	Goals	Apps	Goals	Apps	Goals	Apps	Goals
Falkirk	2024–25	Scottish Championship	16	2	1	0	0	0	—		17	2
Falkirk	2025–26	Scottish Premiership	17	8	4	2	0	0	—		21	10
Falkirk	Total		33	10	5	2	0	0	0	0	38	12
Dunfermline Athletic (loan)	2025–26	Scottish Championship	11	6	0	0	0	0	1 (Note: Appearance in Scottish Challenge Cup)	2	12	8
West Bromwich Albion	2026–27	EFL Championship	10	1	0	0	2	0	—		12	1
Career total			55	16	5	2	2	0	1	2	58	21
