= Ben Barron =

Scottish footballer (born 2004)

Personal information
- Full name: Ben Robert John Barron
- Date of birth: 18 December 2004 (age 21)
- Place of birth: Inverness, Scotland
- Position: Forward

Team information
- Current team: Nairn County

Youth career
- 2016–2022: Inverness CT

Senior career*
Years	Team	Apps	(Gls)
2022–2023	Inverness CT	0	(0)
2022	→ Forres Mechanics (loan)	9	(2)
2022–2023	Forres Mechanics	32	(14)
2023–2024	Elgin City	16	(0)
2024	→ Nairn County (loan)	10	(10)
2024–2026	Nairn County	56	(32)
2026–	Brora Rangers	2	(1)
- * Club domestic league appearances and goals as of 9 August 2026

Ben Barron (born 18 December 2004) is a Scottish professional footballer who plays as a forward for Highland League club, Brora Rangers.

== Club career ==
Born in Inverness, Barron was raised in Nairn.

Barron began his football journey in the youth academy of Inverness CT, being in the clubs ranks from 2016 to 2022.

Towards the end of the 2021/22 season, he was loaned to Forres Mechanics in the Highland League, marking his initial exposure to senior-level football. During this loan spell, he scored two goals in nine appearances. Impressed by his performance, Forres Mechanics secured Barron's services on a permanent basis for the 2022/23 season. He delivered an impressive tally of 14 goals in 32 appearances.

His consistent performances caught the attention of Elgin City, an SPFL League Two club, leading to his transfer in the summer of 2023. Barron made an immediate impact by scoring on his debut against St Johnstone B in the SPFL Challenge Cup. Over the course of the 2023/24 season, he accumulated 20 appearances for Elgin City.

In January 2024, Barron joined Nairn County on loan, returning to his hometown club. His performances during the loan spell impressed Nairn County and convinced the club to sign him on a permanent basis in the summer on a three-year contract.

On 5 August 2026, Barron made the switch to Highland League rivals, Brora Rangers. He made his debut later that day during a thrashing 8–0 derby win over Wick Academy, scoring in the 64th minute after coming on as a substitute.
