= Ben Parkinson (footballer) =

English footballer (born 2005)

Personal information
- Date of birth: 10 March 2005 (age 21)
- Place of birth: Durham, England
- Position: Forward

Team information
- Current team: Falkirk
- Number: 7

Youth career
- 2012–2023: Newcastle United

Senior career*
Years	Team	Apps	(Gls)
2023–2026	Newcastle United	1	(0)
2026–	Falkirk	9	(0)
- * Club domestic league appearances and goals as of 20 May 2026

Ben Parkinson (born 10 March 2005) is an English professional footballer who plays as a forward for Scottish Premiership club Falkirk.

== Career ==
=== Newcastle United ===
Parkinson joined the club's academy at the age of seven. He made his competitive debut for the club in a Premier League away fixture against AFC Bournemouth on 11 November 2023.

=== Falkirk ===
Parkinson joined Falkirk in January 2026.

== Career statistics ==
=== Club ===
As of 18 January 2026

Appearances and goals by club, season and competition
Club	Season	League			National cup		League cup (Note: Includes EFL Cup)		Other		Total	
Club	Season	Division	Apps	Goals	Apps	Goals	Apps	Goals	Apps	Goals	Apps	Goals
Newcastle United U21	2023–24	—			—		—		2 (Note: Appearance(s) in EFL Trophy)	0	2	0
Newcastle United	2023–24	Premier League	1	0	0	0	0	0	0	0	1	0
Falkirk	2025-26	Scottish Premiership	2	0	1	1	0	0	0	0	3	1
Career total			3	0	1	1	0	0	2	0	6	1
