= Michael Ndiweni =

English association football player

Personal information
- Date of birth: 2 December 2003 (age 22)
- Place of birth: Leeds, England
- Position: Forward

Team information
- Current team: Ohio State Buckeyes
- Number: 25

Youth career
- 2016–2023: Newcastle United

College career
Years	Team	Apps	(Gls)
2025–	Ohio State Buckeyes	0	(0)

Senior career*
Years	Team	Apps	(Gls)
2023–2024	Newcastle United	1	(0)
2024	→ Annan Athletic (loan)	15	(2)
2024–2025	Ashington	20	(2)
2025	Newcastle Blue Star	19	(10)
- * Club domestic league appearances and goals as of 15:42, 28 January 2025 (UTC)

Michael Ndiweni (born 2 December 2003) is an English professional footballer who plays as a striker for Ohio State Buckeyes.

== Early life ==
From Throckley, he attended St Cuthberts High School.

== Career ==
A boyhood Newcastle United fan, he joined the Newcastle academy in 2016. He signed his first professional contract with the club in July 2022. He extended that contract in the summer of 2023. He made his first team debut on 25 November 2023, appearing as a second-half substitute in a 4–1 win in the Premier League against Chelsea. He continued to train with the Newcastle first-team squad for the next fixture, a UEFA Champions League match against French champions Paris Saint Germain on 28 November 2023. He was named among the match day substitutes for the tie.

At the end of the January transfer window in 2024, he signed on a six-month loan deal for Annan Athletic. He scored his first goal in Scottish League One against Stirling Albion in February 2024. He was released by Newcastle at the end of the 2023–24 season.

Post-Newcastle, Ndiweni would go on to have short spells at Ashington AFC And Newcastle Blue Star. In March 2025, he featured in the inaugural Baller League UK, in the team FC Rules the World, managed by Clint Ogbenna, (professionally known as Clint 419).

He started playing in 2025 in the United States for the Ohio State Buckeyes in the Big Ten Conference under head coach and former men's United States national team international Brian Maisonneuve.

== Personal life ==
Born in England, he has Zimbabwean heritage. His brother Ryan is also part of the academy at Newcastle. His father works as a football coach in Newcastle.
