= 1957 Scottish Cup final =

1957 Scottish Cup Final
- Event: 1956–57 Scottish Cup
Falkirk	Kilmarnock
1	1
- Date: 20 April 1957
- Venue: Hampden Park, Glasgow
- Referee: Jack Mowat (Burnside)
- Attendance: 81,375

Replay
Falkirk	Kilmarnock
2	1
- (after extra time)
- Date: 24 April 1957
- Venue: Hampden Park, Glasgow
- Referee: Jack Mowat (Burnside)
- Attendance: 79,960

The 1957 Scottish Cup Final was an association football match, the 72nd staging of the final of the Scottish Cup, Scottish football's most prestigious knock-out competition. The match took place at Hampden Park on 20 April 1957 and was contested by Division One clubs Falkirk and Kilmarnock. It was Falkirk's second appearance in the final and Kilmarnock's sixth.

As Division One clubs, both entered the tournament in the fifth round. Neither club won all four of their ties at the first attempt, Falkirk requiring a replay in the semi-final to knock out fellow Division One club Raith Rovers whom they defeated in the club's last appearance in the final in 1913. Falkirk defeated two Division Two clubs and another from Division One before the final. Kilmarnock needed a replay to knock out the club who defeated them in their last final appearance also, East Fife. They went on to eliminate the 1956 runners-up, Celtic, in the replayed semi-final.

It was only Falkirk's second appearance in the final, their first in 44 years since success in 1913. Kilmarnock were making their sixth appearance in their history, winning twice, the last victory coming in 1929.

The first match ended in a 1–1 draw. Falkirk took the lead after 33 minutes when John Prentice scored from the penalty spot after a foul by Willie Toner. Kilmarnock equalised in first half injury time with a goal from David Curlett. With no goals in the second half, the scores remained level to force a replay four days later. In the replay, Falkirk took the lead again through George Merchant. Kilmarnock again equalised with only 12 minutes until the end to see the match into extra time. Doug Moran scored the winning goal for Falkirk in the 101st minute of the match to seal victory for Falkirk and be crowned champions for the second time in its history.

== Route to the final ==
Round	Opposition	Score
Fifth round	Berwick Rangers	2–1
Sixth round	Aberdeen	3–1
Quarter-final	Clyde	2–1
Semi-final	Raith Rovers	2–2
Semi-final replay	Raith Rovers	2–0

=== Falkirk ===
Round	Opposition	Score
Fifth round	Ayr United	1–0
Sixth round	East Fife	0–0
Sixth round replay	East Fife	2–0
Quarter-final	Airdrieonians	3–1
Semi-final	Celtic	1–1
Semi-final replay	Celtic	3–1

== Match details ==
=== Original ===
20 April 1957
15:00

Falkirk	1–1	Kilmarnock
Prentice 33' (pen.)	Report	Curlett 45+1'

Hampden Park, Glasgow
Attendance: 81,375
Referee: Jack Mowat (Burnside)

GK	(Scotland) Bert Slater
RB	(Scotland) Alex Parker
LB	(Scotland) Ian Rae
RH	(Scotland) Alex Wright
CH	(Scotland) Andy Irvine
LH	(Scotland) John Prentice (c)
RW	(Scotland) Tommy Murray
IR	(Scotland) Derek Grierson
CF	(Scotland) George Merchant
IL	(Scotland) Doug Moran
LW	(Scotland) Eddie O'Hara
Manager:
(England) Reg Smith

GK	(Scotland) Jimmy Brown
RB	(Scotland) Ralph Collins (c)
LB	(Scotland) Jim Stewart
RH	(Scotland) Rab Stewart
CH	(Scotland) Willie Toner
LH	(Scotland) Alistair Mackay
RW	(Scotland) Gerry Mays
IR	(Scotland) Willie Harvey
CF	(Scotland) David Curlett
IL	(Scotland) Bertie Black
LW	(Scotland) David Burns
Manager:
(Scotland) Malky McDonald

Match rules: 90 minutes.; Replay if scores still level.

=== Replay ===
24 April 1957
19:30

Falkirk	2–1 (a.e.t.)	Kilmarnock
Merchant 24'; Moran 101'	Report	Curlett 78'

Hampden Park, Glasgow
Attendance: 79,960
Referee: Jack Mowat (Burnside)

GK	(Scotland) Bert Slater
RB	(Scotland) Alex Parker
LB	(Scotland) Ian Rae
RH	(Scotland) Alex Wright
CH	(Scotland) Andy Irvine
LH	(Scotland) John Prentice (c)
RW	(Scotland) Tommy Murray
IR	(Scotland) Derek Grierson
CF	(Scotland) George Merchant
IL	(Scotland) Doug Moran
LW	(Scotland) Eddie O'Hara
Manager:
(England) Reg Smith

GK	(Scotland) Jimmy Brown
RB	(Scotland) Ralph Collins (c)
LB	(Scotland) Jim Stewart
RH	(Scotland) Rab Stewart
CH	(Scotland) Willie Toner
LH	(Scotland) Alistair Mackay
RW	(Scotland) Gerry Mays
IR	(Scotland) Willie Harvey
CF	(Scotland) David Curlett
IL	(Scotland) Bertie Black
LW	(Scotland) David Burns
Manager:
(Scotland) Malky McDonald

Match rules: 90 minutes.; 30 minutes of extra-time if necessary.; Replay if scores still level.

== See also ==
- 1997 Scottish Cup Final, played between same teams
