= 2016–17 in Scottish football =

Football in Scotland
- Season: 2016–17

2016–17 in Scottish football

Premiership champions
- Celtic

Championship champions
- Hibernian

League 1 champions
- Livingston

League 2 champions
- Arbroath

Scottish Cup winners
- Celtic

League Cup winners
- Celtic

Challenge Cup winners
- Dundee United

Youth Cup winners
- Celtic

Teams in Europe
- Celtic, Aberdeen, Heart of Midlothian, Hibernian

Scotland national team
- 2018 FIFA World Cup qualification

The 2016–17 season was the 120th season of competitive football in Scotland. The domestic season began on 16 July 2016, with the first round of the 2016–17 Scottish League Cup. The 2016–17 Scottish Professional Football League season commenced on 6 August.

== League competitions ==
=== Scottish Premiership ===
Pos	Team	Pld	W	D	L	GF	GA	GD	Pts	Qualification or relegation (Note: Teams played each other three times (33 matches), before the league split into two groups (the top six and the bottom six) for the last five matches.)
1	Celtic (C)	38	34	4	0	106	25	+81	106	Qualification for the Champions League second qualifying round (Note: Since the winners of the 2016–17 Scottish Cup, Celtic, qualified for European competition based on league position, the spot awarded to the Scottish cup winners (Europa League second qualifying round) was passed to the second-placed team and the spot awarded to the second-placed team (Europa League first qualifying round) was passed to the fourth-placed team.)
2	Aberdeen	38	24	4	10	74	35	+39	76	Qualification for the Europa League second qualifying round
3	Rangers	38	19	10	9	56	44	+12	67	Qualification for the Europa League first qualifying round
4	St Johnstone	38	17	7	14	50	46	+4	58	Qualification for the Europa League first qualifying round
5	Heart of Midlothian	38	12	10	16	55	52	+3	46	
6	Partick Thistle	38	10	12	16	38	54	−16	42	
7	Ross County	38	11	13	14	48	58	−10	46	
8	Kilmarnock	38	9	14	15	36	56	−20	41	
9	Motherwell	38	10	8	20	46	69	−23	38	
10	Dundee	38	10	7	21	38	62	−24	37	
11	Hamilton Academical (O)	38	7	14	17	37	56	−19	35	Qualification for the Premiership play-off final
12	Inverness Caledonian Thistle (R)	38	7	13	18	44	71	−27	34	Relegation to the Scottish Championship

Source: Scottish Premiership, Soccerway
Rules for classification: 1) Points; 2) Goal difference; 3) Goals scored; 4) Play-off (only if deciding champion, UEFA competitions qualification and second stage group allocation).
(C) Champions; (O) Play-off winners; (R) Relegated

=== Scottish Championship ===
Pos	Team	Pld	W	D	L	GF	GA	GD	Pts	Promotion, qualification or relegation
1	Hibernian (C, P)	36	19	14	3	59	25	+34	71	Promotion to Premiership
2	Falkirk	36	16	12	8	58	40	+18	60	Qualification for the Premiership play-off semi-finals
3	Dundee United	36	15	12	9	50	42	+8	57	Qualification for the Premiership play-off quarter-finals
4	Greenock Morton	36	13	13	10	44	41	+3	52	Qualification for the Premiership play-off quarter-finals
5	Dunfermline Athletic	36	12	12	12	46	43	+3	48	
6	Queen of the South	36	11	10	15	46	52	−6	43	
7	St Mirren	36	9	12	15	52	56	−4	39	
8	Dumbarton	36	9	12	15	46	56	−10	39	
9	Raith Rovers (R)	36	10	9	17	35	52	−17	39	Qualification for the Championship play-offs
10	Ayr United (R)	36	7	12	17	33	62	−29	33	Relegation to League One

Source: Soccerway
Rules for classification: 1) Points; 2) Goal difference; 3) Number of goals scored
(C) Champions; (P) Promoted; (R) Relegated

=== Scottish League One ===
Pos	Team	Pld	W	D	L	GF	GA	GD	Pts	Promotion, qualification or relegation
1	Livingston (C, P)	36	26	3	7	80	32	+48	81	Promotion to Scottish Championship
2	Alloa Athletic	36	17	11	8	69	44	+25	62	Qualification to Championship play-offs
3	Airdrieonians	36	16	4	16	61	66	−5	52	Qualification to Championship play-offs
4	Brechin City (O, P)	36	15	5	16	43	49	−6	50	Qualification to Championship play-offs
5	East Fife	36	12	10	14	41	44	−3	46	
6	Queen's Park	36	12	10	14	37	51	−14	46	
7	Stranraer	36	12	8	16	46	50	−4	44	
8	Albion Rovers	36	11	9	16	41	48	−7	42	
9	Peterhead (R)	36	10	10	16	44	59	−15	40	Qualification to League One play-offs
10	Stenhousemuir (R)	36	11	6	19	45	64	−19	39	Relegation to Scottish League Two

Updated to match(es) played on 6 May 2017. Source: Soccerway
Rules for classification: 1) Points; 2) Goal difference; 3) Number of goals scored
(C) Champions; (O) Play-off winners; (P) Promoted; (R) Relegated

=== Scottish League Two ===
Pos	Team	Pld	W	D	L	GF	GA	GD	Pts	Promotion, qualification or relegation
1	Arbroath (C, P)	36	18	12	6	63	36	+27	66	Promotion to League One
2	Forfar Athletic (O, P)	36	18	10	8	69	49	+20	64	Qualification to League One play-offs
3	Annan Athletic	36	18	4	14	61	58	+3	58	Qualification to League One play-offs
4	Montrose	36	14	10	12	44	53	−9	52	Qualification to League One play-offs
5	Elgin City	36	14	9	13	67	47	+20	51	
6	Stirling Albion	36	12	11	13	50	59	−9	47	
7	Edinburgh City	36	11	10	15	38	45	−7	43	
8	Berwick Rangers	36	10	10	16	50	65	−15	40	
9	Clyde	36	10	8	18	49	64	−15	38	
10	Cowdenbeath (O)	36	9	8	19	40	55	−15	35	Qualification to League Two play-off finals

Source: BBC Sport
Rules for classification: 1) Points; 2) Goal difference; 3) Number of goals scored
(C) Champions; (O) Play-off winners; (P) Promoted

=== Non-league football ===
==== Level 5 ====
Highland Football League
Pos	Team	Pld	Pts
1	Buckie Thistle (C)	34	82
2	Cove Rangers	34	82
3	Brora Rangers	34	81
4	Formartine United	34	73
5	Fraserburgh	34	63
6	Forres Mechanics	34	58
7	Turriff United	34	58
8	Wick Academy	34	53
9	Inverurie Loco Works	34	50
10	Keith	34	47
11	Clachnacuddin	34	41
12	Lossiemouth	34	38
13	Nairn County	34	34
14	Huntly	34	34
15	Deveronvale	34	30
16	Rothes	34	26
17	Fort William	34	11
18	Strathspey Thistle	34	9

Source: Highland Football League
(C) Champions

Lowland Football League
Pos	Team	Pld	Pts
1	East Kilbride (C)	30	75
2	East Stirlingshire	30	68
3	The Spartans	30	56
4	Stirling University	30	53
5	Dalbeattie Star	30	47
6	Cumbernauld Colts	30	47
7	BSC Glasgow	30	42
8	Whitehill Welfare	30	40
9	Gretna 2008	30	40
10	Gala Fairydean Rovers	30	40
11	Edinburgh University	30	37
12	Civil Service Strollers	30	37
13	Vale of Leithen	30	37
14	Hawick Royal Albert	30	25
15	Selkirk	30	23
16	Preston Athletic (R)	30	16

Source: Soccerway
(C) Champions;
(R) Relegated

==== Level 6 ====
East of Scotland Football League
Pos	Team	Pld	Pts
1	Lothian Thistle Hutchison Vale (C)	20	53
2	Leith Athletic	20	47
3	Tynecastle	20	43
4	Heriot-Watt University	20	39
5	Coldstream	20	31
6	Stirling University Reserves	20	30
7	Eyemouth United	20	23
8	Peebles Rovers	20	19
9	Ormiston	20	12
10	Tweedmouth Rangers	20	12
11	Burntisland Shipyard	20	10
12	Duns	0	0

Source: East of Scotland Football League
(C) Champions

South of Scotland Football League
Pos	Team	Pld	Pts
1	Edusport Academy (C, P)	26	68
2	Wigtown & Bladnoch	26	66
3	St Cuthbert Wanderers	26	60
4	Threave Rovers	26	40
5	Mid-Annandale	26	40
6	Newton Stewart	26	39
7	Heston Rovers	26	38
8	Abbey Vale	26	38
9	Lochar Thistle	26	35
10	Creetown	26	31
11	Lochmaben	26	26
12	Upper Annandale	26	21
13	Nithsdale Wanderers	26	21
14	Dumfries YMCA	26	1

Source: South of Scotland Football League
(C) Champions;
(P) Promoted

=== SPFL Development League ===
Pos	Team	Pld	W	D	L	GF	GA	GD	Pts	Promotion, qualification or relegation
1	Ross County (C)	32	20	6	6	63	40	+23	66	League winners
2	Hamilton Academical	32	19	7	6	72	39	+33	64	
3	Celtic	32	19	6	7	61	26	+35	63	
4	Hibernian	32	19	4	9	67	43	+24	61	
5	Motherwell	32	17	6	9	66	39	+27	57	
6	Rangers	32	15	6	11	53	47	+6	51	
7	Falkirk	32	14	7	11	57	52	+5	49	
8	Partick Thistle	32	15	3	14	61	64	−3	48	
9	Aberdeen	32	14	4	14	56	58	−2	46	
10	Dunfermline Athletic	32	13	5	14	45	53	−8	44	
11	Heart of Midlothian	32	12	7	13	48	46	+2	43	
12	Kilmarnock	32	9	5	18	51	68	−17	32	
13	St Mirren	32	9	4	19	46	70	−24	31	
14	Dundee United	32	7	9	16	49	66	−17	30	
15	Dundee	32	7	7	18	32	57	−25	28	
16	Inverness Caledonian Thistle	32	7	6	19	32	66	−34	27	
17	St Johnstone	32	5	10	17	34	59	−25	25	

Updated to match(es) played on 5 May 2017. Source: SPFL
Rules for classification: 1) Points; 2) Goal difference; 3) Number of goals scored
(C) Champions

== Honours ==
=== Cup honours ===
Competition	Winner	Score	Runner-up	Match report
2016–17 Scottish Cup	Celtic	2–1	Aberdeen	BBC Sport
2016–17 League Cup	Celtic	3–0	Aberdeen	BBC Sport
2016–17 Challenge Cup	Dundee United	2–1	St Mirren	BBC Sport
2016–17 Youth Cup	Celtic	3–0	Rangers	BBC Sport
2016–17 Junior Cup	Glenafton Athletic	2–1	Auchinleck Talbot	BBC Sport
2016–17 Amateur Cup	Colville Park	1 – 0	Southside	Glasgow World

=== Non-league honours ===
==== Senior ====
Competition	Winner
Highland League	Buckie Thistle
Lowland League	East Kilbride
East of Scotland League	Lothian Thistle Hutchison Vale
South of Scotland League	Edusport Academy

==== Junior ====
West Region

Division	Winner
2016–17 Super League Premier Division	Glenafton Athletic
Super League First Division	Girvan
Ayrshire District League	Darvel Juniors
Central District League First Division	Cambuslang Rangers
Central District League Second Division	Glasgow Perthshire

East Region

Division	Winner
2016–17 Superleague	Kelty Hearts
Premier League	Sauchie Juniors
North Division	Kirriemuir Thistle
South Division	Dunbar United

North Region

Division	Winner
2016–17 Superleague	Banks O'Dee
First Division (West)	Spey Valley United
First Division (East)	Ellon United

=== Individual honours ===
==== PFA Scotland awards ====
Award	Winner	Team
Players' Player of the Year	Scott Sinclair	Celtic
Young Player of the Year	Kieran Tierney	Celtic
Manager of the Year	Brendan Rodgers	Celtic
Championship Player of Year	John McGinn	Hibernian
League One Player of Year	Liam Buchanan	Livingston
League Two Player of Year	Shane Sutherland	Elgin City

==== SFWA awards ====
Award	Winner	Team
Footballer of the Year	Scott Sinclair	Celtic
Young Player of the Year	Kieran Tierney	Celtic
Manager of the Year	Brendan Rodgers	Celtic
International Player of the Year	Robert Snodgrass	Hull City/ West Ham United

== Scottish clubs in Europe ==
Celtic, Aberdeen, Heart of Midlothian and Hibernian qualified for European competition.

=== Celtic ===
UEFA Champions League

12 July 2016 2QR	Lincoln Red Imps (Gibraltar)	1 – 0	(Scotland) Celtic	Gibraltar
	Casciaro 48'	BBC Sport report		Stadium: Victoria Stadium; Referee: Andreas Ekberg (Sweden)

20 July 2016 2QR	Celtic (Scotland)	3 – 0 (3 – 1 agg.)	(Gibraltar) Lincoln Red Imps	Glasgow, Scotland
	Lustig 23'; Griffiths 26'; Roberts 29'	BBC Sport report		Stadium: Celtic Park; Referee: Bartosz Frankowski (Poland)

27 July 2016 3QR	Astana (Kazakhstan)	1 – 1	(Scotland) Celtic	Astana, Kazakhstan
	Logvinenko 19'	BBC Sport report	78' Griffiths	Stadium: Astana Arena; Referee: Paolo Silvio Mazzoleni (Italy)

3 August 2016 3QR	Celtic (Scotland)	2 – 1 (3 – 2 agg.)	(Kazakhstan) Astana	Glasgow, Scotland
	Griffiths 45+3' (pen.); Dembele 90+2' (pen.)	BBC Sport report	62' Ibraimi	Stadium: Celtic Park; Referee: Istvan Kovacs (Romania)

17 August 2016 PO	Celtic (Scotland)	5 – 2	(Israel) Hapoel Be'er Sheva	Glasgow, Scotland
	Rogic 9'; Griffiths 39', 45+1'; Dembele 73'; Brown 85'	BBC Sport report	55' Maranhao; 57' Melikson	Stadium: Celtic Park; Attendance: 52,659; Referee: Damir Skomina (Slovenia)

23 August 2016 PO	Hapoel Be'er Sheva (Israel)	2 – 0 (4 – 5 agg.)	(Scotland) Celtic	Be'er Sheva, Israel
	Sahar 21'; Hoban 48'	BBC Sport report		Stadium: Turner Stadium; Attendance: 15,383; Referee: Bas Nijhuis (Netherlands)

13 September 2016 Group C	Barcelona (Spain)	7 – 0	(Scotland) Celtic	Barcelona, Spain
	Messi 3', 27', 60'; Neymar 50'; Iniesta 59'; Suárez 75', 88'	BBC Sport report		Stadium: Camp Nou; Attendance: 73,290; Referee: Ovidiu Hategan (Romania)

28 September 2016 Group C	Celtic (Scotland)	3 – 3	(England) Manchester City	Glasgow, Scotland
	Dembélé 3', 47'; Sterling 20' (o.g.)	BBC Sport report	11' Fernandinho; 28' Sterling; 55' Nolito	Stadium: Celtic Park; Attendance: 57,592; Referee: Nicola Rizzoli (Italy)

19 October 2016 Group C	Celtic (Scotland)	0 – 2	(Germany) Borussia Mönchengladbach	Glasgow, Scotland
		BBC Sport report	57' Stindl; 77' Hahn	Stadium: Celtic Park; Attendance: 57,814; Referee: Anastasios Sidiropoulos (Greece)

1 November 2016 Group C	Borussia Mönchengladbach (Germany)	1 – 1	(Scotland) Celtic	Mönchengladbach, Germany
	Stindl 32'	BBC Sport report	76' (pen.) Dembele	Stadium: Borussia Park; Attendance: 46,283; Referee: Jorge Sousa (Portugal)

23 November 2016 Group C	Celtic (Scotland)	0 – 2	(Spain) Barcelona	Glasgow, Scotland
		BBC Sport report	24', 55' (pen.) Messi	Stadium: Celtic Park; Attendance: 57,937; Referee: Daniele Orsato (Italy)

6 December 2016 Group C	Manchester City (England)	1 – 1	(Scotland) Celtic	Manchester, England
	Iheanacho 8'	BBC Sport report	4' Roberts	Stadium: Etihad Stadium; Attendance: 51,297; Referee: Slavko Vinčić (Slovenia)

=== Aberdeen ===
UEFA Europa League

30 June 2016 1QR	Aberdeen (Scotland)	3 – 1	(Luxembourg) CS Fola Esch	Aberdeen, Scotland
	Logan 68'; McGinn 90+3'; Rooney 90+7' (pen.)	BBC Sport report	70' Klein	Stadium: Pittodrie Stadium; Attendance: 12,570; Referee: Mads Kristoffersen (Denmark)

7 July 2016 1QR	CS Fola Esch (Luxembourg)	1 – 0 (2 – 3 agg.)	(Scotland) Aberdeen	Esch-sur-Alzette, Luxembourg
	Hadji 45'	BBC Sport report		Stadium: Stade Émile Mayrisch; Referee: Ola Hobber Nilsen (Norway)

14 July 2016 2QR	Aberdeen (Scotland)	3 – 0	(Latvia) Ventspils	Aberdeen, Scotland
	Stockley 71'; Rooney 75'; Burns 90+1'	BBC Sport report		Stadium: Pittodrie Stadium; Attendance: 10,672; Referee: João Pinheiro (Portugal)

21 July 2016 2QR	Ventspils (Latvia)	0 – 1 (0 – 4 agg.)	(Scotland) Aberdeen	Ventspils, Latvia
		BBC Sport report	79' Rooney	Stadium: Ventspils Olimpiskais Stadions; Referee: Danilo Grujic (Serbia)

28 July 2016 3QR	Aberdeen (Scotland)	1 – 1	(Slovenia) Maribor	Aberdeen, Scotland
	Hayes 88'	BBC Sport report	83' Novakovic	Stadium: Pittodrie Stadium; Attendance: 17,105; Referee: Tore Hansen (Norway)

4 August 2016 3QR	Maribor (Slovenia)	1 – 0 (2 – 1 agg.)	(Scotland) Aberdeen	Maribor, Slovenia
	Shinnie 90+4' (o.g.)	BBC Sport report		Stadium: Ljudski vrt Referee: Nikola Popov (Bulgaria)

=== Heart of Midlothian ===
UEFA Europa League

30 June 2016 1QR	Heart of Midlothian (Scotland)	2 – 1	(Estonia) FC Infonet	Edinburgh, Scotland
	Buaben 28' (pen.); Kalimullin 36' (o.g.)	BBC Sport report	21' Harin	Stadium: Tynecastle Stadium; Attendance: 14,417; Referee: Vilhjalmur Thorarinsson (Iceland)

6 July 2016 1QR	FC Infonet (Estonia)	2 – 4 (3 – 6 agg.)	(Scotland) Heart of Midlothian	Tallinn, Estonia
	Harin 51'; Voskoboinikov 63'	BBC Sport report	2' Paterson; 9', 52' Rossi; 45+1' Ozturk	Stadium: Lasnamäe KJH Stadium; Referee: Petr Ardeleánu (Czech Republic)

14 July 2016 2QR	Birkirkara (Malta)	0 – 0	(Scotland) Heart of Midlothian	Paola, Malta
		BBC Sport report		Stadium: Hibernians Stadium; Referee: Ivaylo Stoyanov (Bulgaria)

21 July 2016 2QR	Heart of Midlothian (Scotland)	1 – 2 (1 – 2 agg.)	(Malta) Birkirkara	Edinburgh, Scotland
	Sammon 73'	BBC Sport report	55' Bubalovic; 67' Herrera	Stadium: Tynecastle Stadium; Attendance: 14,301; Referee: Ville Nevalainen (Finland)

=== Hibernian ===
UEFA Europa League

14 July 2016 2QR	Hibernian (Scotland)	0 – 1	(Denmark) Brøndby IF	Edinburgh. Scotland
		BBC Sport report	1' Wilczek	Stadium: Easter Road; Attendance: 13,454; Referee: Juan Martínez Munuera (Spain)

21 July 2016 2QR	Brøndby IF (Denmark)	0 – 1 (a.e.t.) (1 – 1 agg.) (5–3 p)	(Scotland) Hibernian	Brøndbyvester, Denmark
		BBC Sport report	62' Gray	Stadium: Brøndby Stadium; Referee: Marius Avram (Romania)
	Penalties
	Larsson (penalty scored); Nørgaard (penalty scored); Stückler (penalty scored); Wilczek (penalty scored); Holst (penalty scored)		(penalty missed) McGinn; (penalty scored) Hanlon; (penalty scored) Holt; (penalty scored) Boyle

== Scotland national team ==
4 September 2016 World Cup qualification	Malta	1 – 5	Scotland	Ta' Qali
	Effiong 13'	BBC Sport report	9', 61' (pen.), 84' Snodgrass; 53' Martin; 78' Fletcher	Stadium: Ta' Qali National Stadium; Attendance: 15,069; Referee: Yevhen Aranovsky (Ukraine)

8 October 2016 World Cup qualification	Scotland	1 – 1	Lithuania	Glasgow
	McArthur 89'	BBC Sport report	59' Černych	Stadium: Hampden Park; Attendance: 35,966; Referee: Tobias Stieler (Germany)

11 October 2016 World Cup qualification	Slovakia	3 – 0	Scotland	Trnava
	Mak 18', 56'; Nemec 68'	BBC Sport report		Stadium: Štadión Antona Malatinského; Attendance: 11,098; Referee: Martin Strömbergsson (Sweden)

11 November 2016 World Cup qualification	England	3 – 0	Scotland	London
	Sturridge 24'; Lallana 50'; Cahill 61'	BBC Sport report		Stadium: Wembley Stadium; Attendance: 87,258; Referee: Cüneyt Çakir (Turkey)

22 March 2017 Friendly match	Scotland	1 – 1	Canada	Edinburgh
	Naismith 35'	BBC Sport report	11' Aird	Stadium: Easter Road; Attendance: 9,158; Referee: Jakob Kehlet (Denmark)

26 March 2017 World Cup qualification	Scotland	1 – 0	Slovenia	Glasgow
	Martin 88'	BBC Sport report		Stadium: Hampden Park; Attendance: 20,435; Referee: Björn Kuipers (Netherlands)

10 June 2017 World Cup qualification	Scotland	2 – 2	England	Glasgow
	Griffiths 87', 90'	BBC Sport report	70' Oxlade-Chamberlain; 93' Kane	Stadium: Hampden Park; Attendance: 48,520; Referee: Paolo Tagliavento (Italy)

== Women's football ==
=== Scottish Women's Premier League ===
==== SWPL 1 ====
Pos	Team	Pld	W	D	L	GF	GA	GD	Pts	Qualification or relegation
1	Glasgow City (C)	21	20	0	1	78	12	+66	60	2017–18 Champions League
2	Hibernian (Q)	21	17	1	3	76	17	+59	52	2017–18 Champions League
3	Celtic	21	13	0	8	50	30	+20	39	
4	Stirling University	21	9	1	11	28	45	−17	28	
5	Rangers	21	9	0	12	35	57	−22	27	
6	Spartans	21	7	1	13	24	54	−30	22	
7	Aberdeen	21	5	1	15	17	46	−29	16	
8	Forfar Farmington (R)	21	2	0	19	12	59	−47	6	2017 SWPL 2

Updated to match(es) played on 30 October 2016. Source: Soccerway
Rules for classification: 1) Points; 2) Goal difference; 3) Number of goals scored
(C) Champions; (Q) Qualified for the phase indicated; (R) Relegated

=== League and Cup honours ===
Division	Winner
SWPL 1	Glasgow City
SWPL 2	Hamilton Academical
SWFL 1 North	East Fife
SWFL 1 South	Motherwell
SWFL 2 North	Granite City
SWFL 2 South West	Renfrew
SWFL 2 Central	Partick Thistle
SWFL 2 East	Dundee United

Competition	Winner	Score	Runner-up	Match report
2016 Scottish Women's Cup	Hibernian	1–1 a.e.t. (6–5 pen)	Glasgow City	BBC Sport
2016 Scottish Women's Premier League Cup	Hibernian	2–1	Glasgow City	BBC Sport
SWFL First Division Cup				
SWFL Second Division Cup				

=== Individual honours ===
Jane Ross and Caroline Weir were both nominated for the (English) PFA Women's Players' Player of the Year award.

==== SWPL awards ====
Award	Winner	Team
Players' Player of the Year		
Player of the Year		
Manager of the Year		
Young Player of the Year		

=== UEFA Women's Champions League ===
==== Glasgow City ====
6 October 2016 Round of 32	Eskilstuna United (Sweden)	1–0	(Scotland) Glasgow City	Eskilstuna, Sweden
19:00	Larsson 52'	UEFA		Stadium: Tunavallen; Referee: Tania Fernandes Morais (Luxembourg)

13 October 2016 Round of 32	Glasgow City (Scotland)	1–2 (1–3 agg.)	(Sweden) Eskilstuna United	Airdrie, Scotland
19:45	Crilly 46'	UEFA	Schough 7', 58'	Stadium: Excelsior Stadium; Referee: Stéphanie Frappart (France)

==== Hibernian ====
5 October 2016 Round of 32	Hibernian (Scotland)	0–6	(Germany) Bayern Munich	Edinburgh, Scotland
19:30		UEFA	Van der Gragt 6'; Miedema 26', 57'; Leupolz 38', 63'; Behringer 67' (pen.)	Stadium: Easter Road; Attendance: 2,551; Referee: Esther Staubli (Switzerland)

12 October 2016 Round of 32	Bayern Munich (Germany)	4–1 (10–1 agg.)	(Scotland) Hibernian	Munich, Germany
18:00	Gerhart 6', 38'; Evans 33'; Miedema 72'	UEFA	Harrison 39'	Stadium: Grünwalder Stadion; Referee: Marte Sørø, (Norway)

=== Scotland women's national team ===
The Scotland women's national football team qualified for a major tournament for the first time. A loss by Finland against Portugal confirmed that Scotland would finish qualifying as one of the six best runners-up, guaranteeing a place in UEFA Women's Euro 2017.

20 September 2016 Euro 2017 qualifying	Iceland	1–2	Scotland	Reykjavík
18:00 WEST	Friðriksdóttir 39'	BBC Sport	29', 56' (pen.) Ross	Stadium: Laugardalsvöllur; Attendance: 6,468

20 October 2016 Friendly	Scotland	0–7	Netherlands	Livingston
19:00 WEST		BBC Sport		Stadium: Almondvale Stadium; Attendance: 1,326

20 January 2017 Friendly	Denmark	2–2	Scotland	Larnaca, Cyprus
15:00 EET	Harder 5'; Rasmussen 31'	Scottish FA	21' Ross; 71' Cuthbert	Stadium: GSZ Stadium

23 January 2017 Friendly	Denmark	1–1	Scotland	Paralimni, Cyprus
11:00 EET	Brown 4' (o.g.)	BBC Sport	77' (pen.) Little	Stadium: Paralimni Stadium

1 March 2017 Cyprus Cup group stage	New Zealand	2–3	Scotland	Larnaca
14:30 EET	White 20'; Hearn 90+2'	BBC Sport	9' J Ross; 83' Cuthbert; 87' Little	Stadium: Ammochostos Stadium

3 March 2017 Cyprus Cup group stage	Scotland	0–2	South Korea	Nicosia
17:30 EET		Scottish FA	48' Kim; 74' (pen.) Cho	Stadium: GSP Stadium

6 March 2017 Cyprus Cup group stage	Austria	1–3	Scotland	Larnaca
17:30 EET	Billa 65'	BBC Sport	58' J. Ross; 78' L. Ross; 90' Evans	Stadium: GSZ Stadium

8 March 2017 Cyprus Cup fifth-place play-off	Scotland	0–0	Wales	Paralimni
14:30 EET		Scottish FA		Stadium: Tasos Markos Stadium

11 April 2017 Friendly	Belgium	5–0	Scotland	Leuven
19:00 CEST	Coutereels; Mermans; Wullaert; Blom	BBC Sport		Stadium: Den Dreef

9 June 2017 Friendly	Scotland	2–0	Romania	Falkirk
	Evans 2'; Ross 47'	BBC Sport		Stadium: Falkirk Stadium

13 June 2017 Friendly	Sweden	1–0	Scotland	Växjö
	Seger 84'	BBC Sport		Stadium: Myresjöhus Arena

== Deaths ==
- 3 July: Jimmy Frizzell, 79, Greenock Morton inside forward.
- July: David Nicol, 80, Falkirk, Stirling Albion and Cowdenbeath wing half.
- 8 July: Jackie McInally, 79, Kilmarnock, Motherwell and Hamilton Academical forward.
- 21 July: Dick Donnelly, 74, East Fife and Brechin City goalkeeper, journalist and Radio Tay sports broadcaster.
- 5 August: Joe Davis, 75, Third Lanark and Hibernian defender.
- 20 August: Rab Stewart, 54, Dunfermline Athletic, Motherwell, Falkirk and Queen of the South forward.
- 5 September: Max Murray, 80, Queen's Park, Rangers, Third Lanark and Clyde forward.
- 13 September: Matt Gray, 80, Third Lanark forward.
- 16 September: Donald Cameron, 77, Ayr United chairman (2005–08).
- 19 September: Donnie Fraser, Inverness Caledonian Thistle director (2015–16).
- 20 September: Alan Cousin, 78, Dundee, Hibernian and Falkirk forward.
- 1 October: David Herd, 82, Scotland forward.
- 2 October: Jimmy McIntosh, 80, Falkirk wing-half; Forres Mechanics player/manager.
- 10 October: Gerry Gow, 64, Scotland under-23 midfielder.
- 10 October: Eddie O'Hara, 80, Falkirk and Morton winger.
- 16 October: George Peebles, 80, Dunfermline Athletic and Stirling Albion winger; Stirling Albion manager.
- 19 October: George McKimmie, 65, Dunfermline Athletic forward.
- 7 November: Eric Murray, 74, Kilmarnock and St Mirren wing half.
- 8 November: Ian Cowan, 71, Falkirk, Partick Thistle and Dunfermline Athletic forward.
- 16 November: Daniel Prodan, 44, Rangers defender.
- 25 November: Jim Gillespie, 69, Raith Rovers and Dunfermline Athletic winger.
- 26 November: David Provan, 75, Rangers, St Mirren and Scotland defender; Albion Rovers manager.
- 6 December: Dave MacLaren, 82, Dundee goalkeeper.
- 10 December: Tommy McCulloch, 82, Clyde and Hamilton goalkeeper.
- 11 December: Charlie McNeil, 53, Stirling Albion winger.
- 18 January: John Little, 86, Queen's Park, Rangers, Morton and Scotland defender.,
- 27 January: Billy Simpson, 87, Rangers, Stirling Albion and Partick Thistle forward.
- 18 February: Roger Hynd, 75, Rangers defender and Motherwell manager.
- 22 February: Paul Morrison, 42, Arbroath midfielder.
- 27 February: Alex Young, 80, Hearts and Scotland forward.
- 2 March: Tommy Gemmell, 73, Celtic, Dundee and Scotland full-back; Dundee and Albion Rovers manager.
- 22 March: Ken Currie, 91, Heart of Midlothian, Third Lanark, Raith Rovers, Dunfermline Athletic and Stranraer inside forward.
- 1 April: Stuart Markland, 69, Berwick Rangers, Dundee United and Montrose defender.
- 21 April: Ugo Ehiogu, 44, Rangers defender.
- 2 May: Cammy Duncan, 51, Motherwell, Partick Thistle, Ayr United and Albion Rovers goalkeeper.
- 6 May: Tommy Henaughan, 86, Queen's Park, Kilmarnock and Morton forward.
- 18 May: Eric Stevenson, 74, Hibernian and Ayr United winger.
- 19 May: Tommy Ross, 70, Ross County forward.
- 26 May: Derek Neilson, 58, Brechin City and Berwick Rangers goalkeeper.
- 18 June: Albert Franks, 81, Rangers, Morton and Queen of the South wing half.
- 27 June: Stéphane Paille, 52, Hearts midfielder.
- 28 June: John Higgins, 87, Hibernian and St Mirren defender.
