= Tom Murray =

Tom Murray may refer to:

== Sports ==
=== Association football ===
- Tom Murray (footballer, born 1889) (1889–1976), English footballer
- Tommy Murray (footballer, born January 1933) (1933–2026), Scottish outside right for Falkirk, Queen of the South, Leeds and Tranmere
- Tommy Murray (footballer, born February 1933) (1933–2019), Scottish inside forward for Darlington, St. Johnstone, Alloa, Albion Rovers and Stranraer
- Tommy Murray (footballer, born 1943) (1943–2025), Scottish footballer

=== Other sports ===
- Tom Murray (baseball) (1867–1939), American Major League Baseball pitcher
- Tom Murray (curler) (1877–1944), Scottish winner of the Olympic Gold medal in curling at the inaugural Winter Olympics in Chamonix, France
- Tom Murray (golfer) (born 1990), English golfer
- Tom Murray (American rower) (born 1969), American rower
- Tom Murray (New Zealand rower) (born 1994), New Zealand rower
- Tommy Murray (ice hockey) (1893–1963), American ice hockey goalie

== Politics ==
- Tom Ellis Murray (1891–1958), American politician from Iowa
- Tom J. Murray (1894–1971), American politician from Tennessee

== Others ==
- Tom Murray (filmmaker), also a film academic in Australia
- Tom Murray (musician) (born 1948), drummer for American band The Litter
- Tom Murray (actor) (1874–1935), American silent-era actor
- Tom E. Murray (1858–1936), American comedian and actor

== See also ==
- Thomas Murray (disambiguation)
