= Thomas Murray =

Thomas Murray may refer to:

== Politicians ==
- Thomas Murray (Australian politician) (1885–1969), member of the New South Wales Legislative Council
- Thomas Murray (Canadian politician) (1836–1915), former member of the Canadian House of Commons and Legislative Assembly of Ontario
- Thomas B. Murray (1938–1998), Wisconsin State Assemblyman
- Thomas Murray Jr. (1770–1823), United States representative from Pennsylvania
- Tom J. Murray (1894–1971), U.S. representative from Tennessee
- Thomas Patrick Murray (1880–1981), Ontario Legislative Assembly member from Renfrew South, 1929–1945
- Thomas Templeton Murray (1891–1966), New Zealand politician

== Sportspeople ==
- Tom Murray (American rower) (born 1969), American rower
- Thomas Murray (curler) (1877–1944), Scottish curler
- Tom Murray (New Zealand rower) (born 1994), New Zealand rower
- Thomas Murray (soccer), American soccer player
- Tommy Murray (ice hockey) (1893–1963), American ice hockey goalie
- Thomas Murray (footballer) (1889–1976), English footballer
- Tommy Murray (footballer, born January 1933), Scottish football outside right for Falkirk, Queen of the South, Leeds and Tranmere
- Tommy Murray (footballer, born February 1933), Scottish football inside forward for Darlington, St. Johnstone, Alloa, Albion Rovers and Stranraer
- Tommy Murray (footballer, born 1943), Scottish footballer

== Other ==
- Tom Murray, Australian documentary filmmaker, academic and director of Dhakiyarr vs the King, In My Father's Country, Love In Our Own Time and The Skin of Others
- Thomas Murray (writer) (1792–1872), Scottish printer and biographer
- T. C. Murray (1873–1959), Irish dramatist
- Thomas E. Murray (1860–1929), inventor and entrepreneur
- Thomas Murray (organist) (born 1943), professor of organ at Yale University
- Thomas Murray (artist) (1663–1734), portrait painter
- Thomas Murray (provost of Eton) (1564–1623), Provost of Eton College
- Thomas Murray (Medal of Honor), American Indian Wars soldier and Medal of Honor recipient
- Thomas John Murray (born 1938), Canadian doctor and author
- Thomas Murray (British Army officer, died 1764) (1698–1764), lieutenant-general in the British Army
- Thomas Murray (British Army officer, died 1816) (1749–1816), Lieutenant-Governor of Portsmouth

== See also ==
- Tom Murray (disambiguation)
