= 1952 Scottish League Cup final =

- Event: 1952–53 Scottish League Cup
Dundee	Kilmarnock
2	0
- Date: 25 October 1952
- Venue: Hampden Park, Glasgow
- Attendance: 51,830

The 1952 Scottish League Cup final was played on 25 October 1952, at Hampden Park in Glasgow and was the final of the 7th Scottish League Cup competition. The final was contested by Dundee and Kilmarnock. Dundee won the match 2–0, thanks to two goals by Bobby Flavell. This meant that they retained the trophy, having beaten Rangers in the previous season.

== Match details ==
25 October 1952

Dundee	2–0	Kilmarnock
Flavell	Report (page 9)

Hampden Park, Glasgow
Attendance: 51,830
Referee: Jack Mowat

DUNDEE :
GK	Bobby Henderson
FB	Gerry Follon
FB	Gordon Frew
RH	Ken Ziesing
CH	Alf Boyd (c)
LH	Doug Cowie
RW	Jimmy Toner
IF	Bert Henderson
CF	Bobby Flavell
IF	Billy Steel
LW	George Christie
Manager:
George Anderson

KILMARNOCK :
GK	John Niven
FB	Ralph Collins
FB	Jimmy Hood
RH	John Russell
CH	Bob Thyne
LH	Jimmy Middlemass (c)
RW	Tommy Henaughan
IF	Willie Harvey
CF	Gerry Mays
IF	Willie Jack
LW	Matt Murray
Manager:
Malky McDonald
