= Rab Stewart =

Scottish footballer

Personal information
- Full name: Robert Edward Thorburn Stewart
- Date of birth: 7 October 1932
- Place of birth: Kilmarnock, Scotland
- Date of death: 27 September 1992 (aged 59)
- Place of death: Kilmarnock, Scotland
- Position: Right half

Senior career*
Years	Team	Apps	(Gls)
- Dreghorn Juniors
1951–1961	Kilmarnock	102	(7)
1961–1962	St Mirren	35	(0)
1962–1963	Ayr United	11	(2)
Total		148	(9)

Managerial career
- 1972–?: Scotland Women
- * Club domestic league appearances and goals

Robert Edward Thorburn Stewart (7 October 1932 – 27 September 1992) was a Scottish professional footballer who played as a right half, making nearly 150 appearances in the Scottish Football League. After retiring as a player, Stewart became a coach and was the original manager of the Scotland women's national football team.

== Career ==
=== Playing career ===
Stewart began his Scottish Football League career at Kilmarnock in 1951, starting for Killie in the 1956–57 Scottish Cup final and final replay defeat to Falkirk. Manager Willie Waddell later tried to boost the team's forward line by handing Stewart an attacking position, but during the experiment his regular place at wing half was taken by Frank Beattie. Stewart moved on to St Mirren, where he played in their 1961–62 Scottish Cup final defeat, then Ayr United.

=== Coaching career ===
In November 1972, Stewart took charge of the Scotland women's national football team for the first ever official women's international match to take place in Britain, a 3–2 defeat to England at Ravenscraig Stadium in Greenock.
