= Alex Wright (footballer, born 1925) =

Scottish footballer (1925–1999)

Personal information
- Full name: Alexander Mason Wright
- Date of birth: 18 October 1925
- Place of birth: Kirkcaldy, Scotland
- Date of death: 15 March 1999 (aged 73)
- Place of death: Kirkcaldy, Scotland
- Position: Forward

Youth career
- Bowhill Rovers

Senior career*
Years	Team	Apps	(Gls)
1946–1947	Hibernian	2	(0)
1947–1950	Barnsley	84	(31)
1950–1951	Tottenham Hotspur	2	(1)
1951–1954	Bradford Park Avenue	131	(25)
1955–1959	Falkirk	95	(20)
Total		314	(77)
- * Club domestic league appearances and goals

Alexander Mason Wright (18 October 1925 – 15 March 1999) was a Scottish professional footballer who played for Bowhill Rovers, Hibernian, Barnsley, Tottenham Hotspur, Bradford Park Avenue and Falkirk.

== Playing career ==
Wright began his career with youth side Bowhill Rovers. He joined Hibernian where he featured in three official matches. Wright signed for Barnsley in August 1947. The forward scored 31 goals in 84 appearances between 1947 and 1950 for Oakwell based club. In September 1950, Wright signed for Tottenham Hotspur in a £12,000 transfer deal. Wright scored on his senior debut against Chelsea at Stamford Bridge on 3 March 1951. He was a member of the Spurs Push and run First Division championship winning team of 1950-51. Wright transferred to Bradford Park Avenue in August 1951 and went on feature in 131 matches and netting a further 25 goals. After leaving the Yorkshire side he joined Falkirk where he played in both matches of the replayed Scottish Cup final against Kilmarnock in 1957. Falkirk were the eventual 2–1 winners. Wright played a total of 95 matches and scored 20 goals between 1955 and 1959 for the Brockville Park team.

== Honours ==
Falkirk

- Scottish Cup winner:1956-57
