= Middlemas =

A Toponymic surname.

In his reference work The Surnames of Scotland, George F. Black shows the surnames Middlemas, Middlemass and Middlemiss as one and to these can be added Midlemas and Middlemist from A Dictionary of English Surnames by P. H. Reaney (subsequently revised by M. A. Wilson) which acknowledges the Scottish source also.

The surname is attributed to an area around Kelso, Roxburghshire in the Eastern Borders of Scotland and specifically a place Middlemestlands.

Although Black uses only three versions of the surname in his dictionary he lists many more from his researches into the recording of them.

1406 - de Meldiemast	1406 - Myddilmast	1425 - Medilmaste	1425 - Middilmaste
1439 - Myddilmast	1495 - Myddilmast	1497 - Myddilmest	1513 - Mydilmest
1530 - Myddilmaist	1537 - Medillmest	1566 - Middlemast	1567 - Middilmest
1610 - Midelmest	1611 - Middelmest	1611 - Midilmest	1612 - Midlemes
1652 - Midlmest	1670 - Midlemist	1674 - Midlmess	1685 - Midlemiss
1742 - Middlemist

It can be assumed that these surnames would not be recorded until they were an accepted form of identity. Many records of birth, death and marriage would be created by church or municipal officials. The extent to which census information was compiled by those with the surname would be limited to an ability to write down their personal version and/or read well enough to correct those official entries that don't match those personal choices of spelling.

== Middlemas ==
Notable people with this surname include:

- Keith Middlemas (1935–2013), English historian
- Jack Middlemas (1896–1984), English footballer
- Rich Middlemas, documentary film maker

== Middlemass ==
Notable people with this surname include:

- Clive Middlemass (1944–2022), English football player and manager
- Frank Middlemass (1919-2006), English actor
- Jimmy Middlemass (1920-1998), Scottish football player (Kilmarnock FC)

== Middlemast ==
Notable people with this surname include:

- E. W. Middlemast (1864–1915), British mathematician and educator

== Middlemiss ==
Notable people with this surname include:

- Bert Middlemiss (1888–1941) was a professional footballer
- Charles Stewart Middlemiss (1859–1945), British geologist
- Elinor Middlemiss (born 1967), Scottish badminton player
- Glen Middlemiss (born 1956), Australian rules footballer
- Jayne Middlemiss (born 1971), English television and radio presenter
- Kenny Middlemiss (born 1964), Scottish badminton player
- Philip Middlemiss (born 1963), British television and radio actor
- Robert Middlemiss (1935-2010), Canadian politician
- Russell Middlemiss (1929–2019), former Australian rules footballer

== See also ==
- Michaelmas
