= David Burns =

David Burns may refer to:

== Sports ==
- David Burns (basketball) (born 1958), American basketball player
- David Burns (footballer, born 1934) (1934–2010), Scottish football player (Kilmarnock FC, St. Johnstone)
- David Burns (footballer, born 1958), English football player (Chester City)
- David Burns (football manager), Dutch-British football coach
- Dave Burns (sportscaster) (born 1963), American sportscaster

== Others ==
- David Burns (actor) (1902–1971), American actor
- David Burns (radio presenter) (born 1959), British radio presenter focusing on sports
- David Burns, Lord Burns, Scottish judge
- David C. Burns, American politician from Maine
- David D. Burns (born 1942), American psychotherapist and author
- David R. Burns, American politician from Maine
- Dave Burns (musician) (1924–2009), American jazz trumpeter
- Dave Burns, a character from the British television series Brookside

== See also ==
- David Burn (1799–1875), Tasmanian dramatist
- David Burnes (1719–1779), also spelled David Burns, land developer
- David Byrne (disambiguation)
