= Bob Thyne =

Scottish footballer

Robert Brown Thyne (9 January 1920 – 16 September 1986) was a Scottish footballer. He played for Darlington in the English Football League and Kilmarnock in the Scottish Football League. Thyne played for Kilmarnock in the 1952 Scottish League Cup Final and played twice for Scotland in unofficial wartime internationals.
