= Willie Toner =

Scottish footballer and manager

Personal information
- Full name: William Toner
- Date of birth: 18 December 1929
- Place of birth: Glasgow, Scotland
- Date of death: 16 March 1999 (aged 69)
- Place of death: Glasgow, Scotland
- Position: Centre half

Youth career
- 1946–1948: Shettleston

Senior career*
Years	Team	Apps	(Gls)
1948–1951	Celtic	2	(0)
1951–1954	Sheffield United	55	(2)
1954–1962	Kilmarnock	186	(4)
1962–1963	Hibernian	9	(0)
1963–1964	Ayr United	18	(0)
Total		270	(6)

International career
1958	Scotland	2	(0)
1958–1960	Scottish League XI	5	(0)
1960–1961	SFL trial v SFA	2	(0)

Managerial career
- 1964–1967: Dumbarton
- * Club domestic league appearances and goals

William Toner (18 December 1929 – 16 March 1999) was a Scottish football player and manager, who played for Celtic, Sheffield United, Kilmarnock, Hibernian and Ayr United. He represented the Scotland national football team twice, and later managed Dumbarton.

His son Kevin became a Scottish Premier League referee.

== Honours ==
Kilmarnock

- Scottish Cup: runner-up 1956–57, 1959–60
- Scottish League Cup: runner-up 1960–61

Dumbarton

- Stirlingshire Cup: 1964-65
