= Ian Rae =

Scottish footballer

Personal information
- Full name: Ian Johnstone Rae
- Date of birth: 19 January 1933
- Place of birth: Grangemouth, Scotland
- Date of death: 4 July 2005 (aged 72)
- Place of death: Wadhurst, East Sussex, England
- Position: Left back

Youth career
- Airth Castle Rovers

Senior career*
Years	Team	Apps	(Gls)
1951–1957	Falkirk	137	(1)
1957–1958	Bristol City	12	(0)
1958–1966	Falkirk	157	(3)
1966–1968	Stenhousemuir	53	(0)
Total		359	(4)

International career
1956	Scotland U23	1	(0)
- * Club domestic league appearances and goals

Ian Johnstone Rae (19 January 1933 – 4 July 2005) was a Scottish footballer, who played for Falkirk, Bristol City and Stenhousemuir. He made one appearance for the Scotland under-23 team.
