= Redding mining disaster =

1923 mining disaster in Scotland

Coordinates: 55.98628°N 3.7364°W

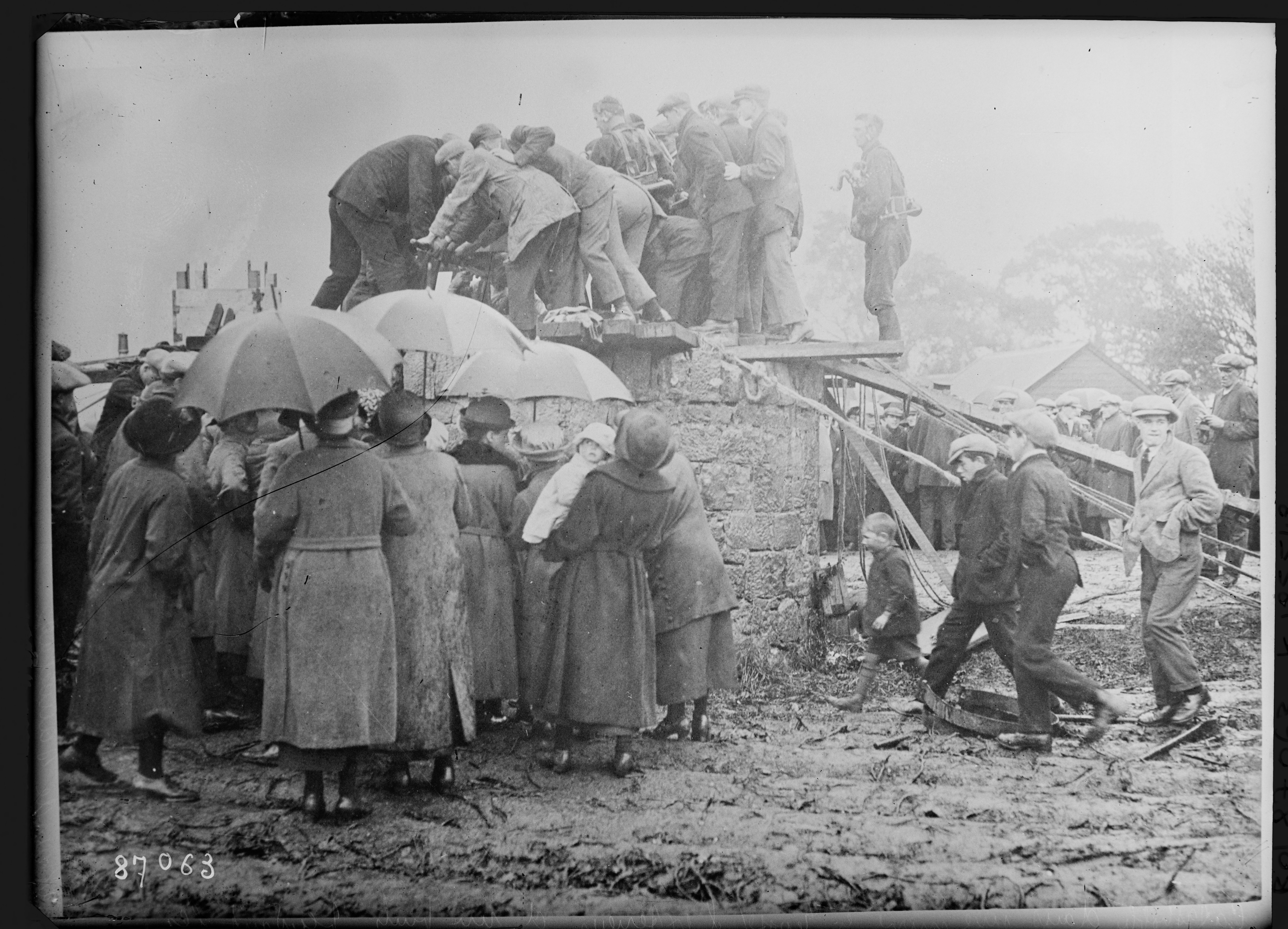
Exteriors of a well during rescue attempts.

The Redding pit disaster was a coal mining disaster in September 1923 when an inrush of water trapped 66 miners underground at a mine shaft in the Central Belt of Scotland, with 40 fatalities.

== History ==
The Redding 23 mine workings were operated by James Nimmo & Co. Ltd. in the vicinity of the village of Redding, Falkirk, where coal mines had been operating for over 100 years.

Early on 25 September 1923, flood water from the former Coxrod mine workings broke through to the Dublin No. 1 branch of the Redding mine and rapidly filled the mine, trapping 66 miners. 21 miners were brought out alive, with a further 5 rescued on 4 October. The bodies of the remaining miners were recovered in November 1923, as the water was drained.

== Memorial ==
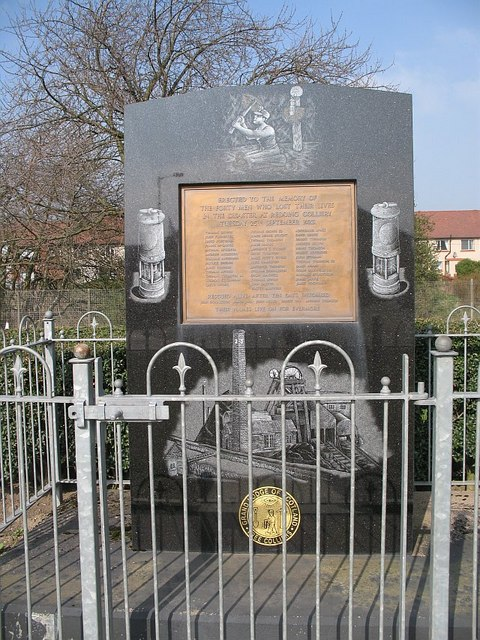
Redding Colliery Memorial

A memorial was erected 22 years after the disaster, in memory of the 40 dead miners.

The centenary of the disaster in September 2023 was marked by memorial events in the area. A new memorial was unveiled by the Sir William Wallace Grand Lodge of Scotland Free Colliers. The Free Colliers hold their annual demonstration on the first Saturday of August every year where they march around the surrounding villages with brass bands. They lay a wreath at the Redding memorial during their parade. The Free Colliers were the first lodge of their kind in Britain and are the last remaining lodge. They celebrated their 160th anniversary in 2023.
