= Ian Cowan =

Scottish footballer (1944–2016)

Personal information
- Full name: Ian Cowan
- Date of birth: 27 November 1944
- Place of birth: Falkirk, Scotland
- Date of death: 8 November 2016 (aged 71)
- Place of death: Falkirk, Scotland
- Position: Right winger

Youth career
- –1959: Camelon Juniors

Senior career*
Years	Team	Apps	(Gls)
1959–1961	Falkirk	5	(0)
1961–1962	Rutherglen Glencairn		
1962–1965	Partick Thistle	64	(13)
1965–1966	St Johnstone	21	(2)
1966–1968	Falkirk	30	(4)
1968–1970	Dunfermline Athletic	5	(1)
1970–1971	Southend United	3	(0)
1971–1972	K.V. Oostende		
1972–1973	Albion Rovers	9	(0)
Total		137	(20)
- * Club domestic league appearances and goals

Ian Cowan (27 November 1944 – 8 November 2016), nicknamed "Cowboy", was a Scottish footballer who played as a right winger.

== Career ==
Cowan started his career with Falkirk in 1959 before moving to Partick Thistle in 1961 where he made nearly 100 appearances for the Firhill club. He then moved on to St Johnstone before returning to Falkirk. Subsequently, Cowan turned out for Dunfermline Athletic, Southend United, K.V. Oostende and Albion Rovers.
