= Evelyn Morrison =

Scottish footballer (1902–1968)

Personal information
- Full name: Evelyn Sneddon Morrison
- Date of birth: 1 August 1902
- Place of birth: Natal Province, South Africa
- Date of death: 15 November 1968 (aged 66)
- Place of death: Hamilton, Scotland
- Position: Centre forward

Youth career
- Moorpark Amateurs

Senior career*
Years	Team	Apps	(Gls)
1927–1928	Stenhousemuir	23	(31)
1928–1929	Falkirk	58	(75)
1929–1931	Sunderland	15	(7)
1931–1932	Partick Thistle	15	(15)
Total		111	(128)
- * Club domestic league appearances and goals

Evelyn Sneddon Morrison (1 August 1902 – 15 November 1968) was a Scottish footballer who played as a centre forward. His most notable spell was with Falkirk, where he finished as the top scorer in Scottish Football League Division One in the 1928–29 season, scoring 43 goals. This remains the highest single-season total ever recorded for the club.

He also played for Stenhousemuir (where he made his senior debut in 1927 aged 26), Sunderland and Partick Thistle, where it appears his short period as a professional concluded in 1932 despite maintaining a strong rate of goalscoring.

Morrison was born in South Africa to Scottish parents; the family returned to their native Lanarkshire while he was a young boy. After his football career ended he became a school teacher in Blantyre. In 1939 he married Lily Ann Stewart Ashenhurst (1904–1960)
