= Eddie O'Hara (footballer, born 1935) =

Scottish footballer

Personal information
- Full name: Albert Edward O'Hara
- Date of birth: 28 October 1935
- Place of birth: Glasgow, Scotland
- Date of death: 10 October 2016 (aged 80)
- Place of death: South Africa
- Position: Left winger

Youth career
- Shettleston

Senior career*
| Years | Team | Apps | (Gls) |
| 1955–1958 | Falkirk | 95 | (18) |
| 1958–1960 | Everton | 29 | (2) |
| 1959–1961 | Rotherham United | 20 | (3) |
| 1961–1962 | Morton | 29 | (5) |
| 1962–1965 | Barnsley | 127 | (36) |
| 1965–1966 | Bloemfontein City | 31 | (15) |
| 1967 | Westview Apollon | 27 | (5) |
| 1968–1970 | Port Elizabeth City | 23 | (1) |
| Total | | 300 | (64) |

International career
| 1957–1958 | Scotland U23 | 3 | (0) |
- * Club domestic league appearances and goals

Albert Edward O'Hara (28 October 1935 – 10 October 2016) was a Scottish professional footballer who played as a left winger. He won the 1956–57 Scottish Cup with Falkirk before moving to Everton in a double transfer with Alex Parker. He also played for Rotherham United, Morton, Barnsley and Bloemfontein City. He was capped by Scotland at age group level.

== Falkirk ==
O'Hara's footballing talent was obvious from early years and played for Scotland Schoolboys. He attracted attention playing for Shettleston with several senior clubs interested in the speedy teenager. He signed for Falkirk where he competed for the winger positions with Willie Sinclair and Tommy Murray. The mercurial O'Hara played a huge role in Falkirk's run to win the 1957 Scottish Cup.

The Scotland Under 23 selectors chose four Falkirk players for the squad to play Netherlands at Tynecastle on 23 October 1957. The four were O'Hara, Alex Parker, Jimmy McIntosh and Bert Slater (Reserve. The Scots won 4–1 with O'Hara impressing. O'Hara earned two more Under 23 caps. Significantly one was against England at Everton's Goodison Park in a 3–1 defeat (the other was in a 2-1 Dutch victory in Amsterdam). From that Scotland side O'Hara, Parker, Alex Young and Alex Scott all moved to the Merseyside club not long afterwards.

Parker was the outstanding talent in the Falkirk team and his move to a bigger club was considered inevitable. Everton moved in with an £18,000 fee to sign Parker and O'Hara in a double swoop in Summer 1958.

== Everton ==
Parker thrived at Everton and was an important part of their 1962-62 Football League Championship win (as was Young and to a lesser extent Scott who arrived late in the championship winning season). O'Hara though found the challenge at Goodison more difficult. He played in 29 league games for The Toffees in which he scored twice before leaving in season 1959/60.

== Rotherham United ==
He joined Rotherham where he scored 3 goals in the 20 league games he played in until the summer of 1961 scoring three goals in his 20 league games.

== Morton ==
He returned to Scotland and played a season with Morton scoring five goals in the 29 league games he played.

== Barnsley ==
O'Hara returned to South Yorkshire to end his UK career at Barnsley between 1962 and '65. At Oakwell he played on either wing scoring 36 League goals in a league career of 127 matches.

== Bloemfontein City ==
He then played in South Africa for Bloemfontein City in the National Football League during the Apartheid era. The NFL in the 1960s and 70s offered a final pay-day for UK players late in their careers. Many went to South Africa in the close season and guested for clubs. FIFA had banned clubs, but not individual players, from playing in South Africa. He played in South Africa for Bloemfontein City, Westview Apollon and Port Elizabeth City.

O'Hara was flown from South Africa by the Falkirk Senior Bairns to attend the 50th Anniversary Dinner for the surviving cup-winners in 2007.

== Death ==
O'Hara died on 10 October 2016 at the age of 80 after a lengthy illness.
