= John Russell (footballer, born 1923) =

Scottish footballer

Personal information
- Date of birth: 15 March 1923
- Place of birth: Glasgow, Scotland
- Date of death: 7 December 2005 (aged 82)
- Place of death: Canada
- Position: Wing half

Youth career
- Pollok

Senior career*
Years	Team	Apps	(Gls)
1947–1950	Motherwell	38	(1)
1950–1956	Kilmarnock	122	(3)
Total		160	(4)
- * Club domestic league appearances and goals

John Russell (15 March 1923 – 7 December 2005) was a Scottish footballer who played for Motherwell and Kilmarnock. Russell appeared in the 1952 Scottish League Cup Final, which Kilmarnock lost 2–0 to Dundee.
