= Alex Parker =

Scottish footballer and manager

Personal information
- Full name: Alexander Hershaw Parker
- Date of birth: 2 August 1935
- Place of birth: Irvine, Scotland
- Date of death: 7 January 2010 (aged 74)
- Place of death: Gretna, Scotland
- Position: Right back

Youth career
- 1950–1952: Kello Rovers

Senior career*
Years	Team	Apps	(Gls)
1952–1958	Falkirk	121	(2)
1958–1965	Everton	198	(5)
1965–1968	Southport	76	(0)
1968–1969	Ballymena United		
1969–1970	Drumcondra	4	(0)

International career
1955–1958	Scotland U23	6	(0)
1955	Scotland B vs A trial	1	(0)
1955–1958	Scotland	15	(0)
1955–1958	Scottish Football League XI	9	(0)
1958–1960	SFA trial v SFL	3	(0)

Managerial career
- 1968–1969: Ballymena United
- 1970–1971: Southport
- * Club domestic league appearances and goals

Alexander Hershaw Parker (2 August 1935 – 7 January 2010) was a Scottish football player and manager. Parker played for Falkirk, Everton and Scotland, amongst others. Parker was named in Falkirk's Team of the Millennium and Everton's Hall of Fame.

== Playing career ==
=== Falkirk ===
Parker, a fullback, began his career with Kello Rovers, turning semi-professional when he joined Falkirk in 1952. The highlight of Parker's time with the Bairns was their 1957 Scottish Cup victory, as they defeated Kilmarnock in a replayed final.

=== Everton ===
Parker moved to Merseyside in June 1958 when Everton paid £18,000 in a double signing of Parker and Eddie O'Hara both from Falkirk. Parker's Toffees debut was delayed by his requirement to fulfil National Service in Cyprus. He eventually became a stalwart in the side which won the 1962–63 league championship, finishing six points ahead of runners-up Tottenham.

After this triumph, however, hamstring injuries started to trouble Parker, and he left Goodison Park in 1965.

=== Southport ===
He joined Southport for £2,000. He stayed three years with the Sandgrounders.

=== Ballymena United ===
Parker next moved to Northern Ireland to become player-manager of Ballymena United.

=== Drumcondra ===
He signed for Drumcondra F.C. in December 1969 and made his League of Ireland debut at Tolka Park on 4 January 1970 in a 3–1 defeat to Dundalk. He left for after only three months to return to the UK.

=== International ===
Parker gained his first cap for Scotland against Portugal in 1955 while playing for Falkirk. He was selected in the squad for the 1958 FIFA World Cup, making one appearance against Paraguay. This also transpired to be his final national team cap, which some regarded as "perverse"; former teammate Alex Young stated that Parker was still the best player in his position in Britain. Parker also represented the Scottish Football League XI.

== Southport manager ==
Parker returned to Souhtport where he was given a coaching role. Two months later he was promoted to manager but this appointment lasted only a single season.

== After football ==
After his retirement from the footballing world, Parker became a publican in Runcorn. He then lived in Gretna, Dumfriesshire.

Parker died of a heart attack on 7 January 2010.

== Career statistics ==
=== International appearances ===
Scotland national team
Year	Apps	Goals
1955	5	0
1956	5	0
1957	3	0
1958	2	0
Total	15	0

== Honours ==
Falkirk

- Scottish Cup: 1956–57

Everton

- First Division: 1962–63
- FA Charity Shield: 1963

Southport

- Fourth Division: promotion 1966–67

Scotland

- British Home Championship: 1955–56 (shared)

Individual

- Rex Kingsley Footballer of the Year: 1957
- Falkirk FC Hall of Fame
- Gwladys Street's Hall of Fame
- Falkirk FC Millennium XI
