= David Byrne (disambiguation) =

David Byrne (born 1952) is an American musician and former Talking Heads frontman.

David Byrne may also refer to:

- David Byrne (album), his eponymous album
- David Byrne (Australian politician) (born 1952), member of the Queensland Legislative Assembly
- David Byrne (barrister) (born 1947), Irish and European official
- David Byrne (footballer, born 1905) (1905–1990), Irish footballer
- David Byrne (footballer, born 1960) (born 1960), South African soccer player who played in North America
- David Byrne (footballer, born 1961), English footballer
- David Byrne (footballer, born 1979), Irish footballer
- David Byrne (Gaelic footballer), Gaelic footballer for Dublin
- David Byrne (criminal), Irish criminal shot dead in February 2016
- David Byrne (playwright), British playwright and Artistic Director of the New Diorama Theatre

== See also ==
- David Burns (disambiguation)
