= Jimmy Middlemass =

Scottish footballer

Personal information
- Full name: James Broomfield Middlemass
- Date of birth: 7 February 1920
- Place of birth: Glasgow, Scotland
- Date of death: 5 July 1998 (aged 78)
- Place of death: Eastwood, East Renfrewshire
- Position: Wing half

Youth career
- Petershill

Senior career*
Years	Team	Apps	(Gls)
1949–1955	Kilmarnock	117	(17)
- * Club domestic league appearances and goals

James Broomfield Middlemass (7 February 1920 – 5 July 1998) was a Scottish footballer who played for Kilmarnock. Middlemass appeared in the 1952 Scottish League Cup Final, which Kilmarnock lost 2–0 to Dundee.
