= Dick Donnelly =

Scottish footballer, broadcaster, and journalist

Personal information
- Full name: Charles Richard Donnelly
- Date of birth: 11 September 1941
- Place of birth: Lochee, Dundee, Scotland
- Date of death: 21 July 2016 (aged 74)
- Place of death: Balmullo, Fife, Scotland
- Position: Goalkeeper

Youth career
- Carnoustie Panmure

Senior career*
Years	Team	Apps	(Gls)
1960–1964	East Fife	79	(0)
	Brechin City	0	(0)
	Arbroath	0	(0)
Total		79	(0)
- * Club domestic league appearances and goals

Charles Richard Donnelly (11 September 1941 – 21 July 2016) was a Scottish footballer, broadcaster, and journalist.

== Early and personal life ==
Donnelly was born in Lochee, Dundee and attended Harris Academy in the city.

He was married with one son, one daughter, and three grandchildren.

== Career ==
After working as an apprentice at DC Thomson, Donnelly began his footballer, playing as a goalkeeper for Carnoustie Panmure, East Fife, Brechin City and Arbroath. He made 79 appearances for East Fife in the Scottish Football League, and 107 appearances in all competitions.

Donnelly began writing Sunday match reports for The Courier in the late 1960s, before becoming a full-time journalist with The People's Journal and the Scottish Sunday Express.

He also broadcast on the radio with Radio Tay and Radio Clyde.
