= Tommy Henaughan =

Scottish footballer

Tommy Henaughen
Personal information
- Full name: Thomas Henaughen
- Date of birth: 25 July 1930
- Place of birth: New Jersey, United States
- Date of death: 6 May 2017 (aged 86)
- Place of death: Edinburgh, Scotland
- Position: Forward

Senior career*
Years	Team	Apps	(Gls)
1950–1951	Queen's Park	10	(2)
1951–1960	Kilmarnock	134	(31)
- → Tonbridge (loan)
1956–1957	→ Brentford (loan)	0	(0)
1960	Stirling Albion	0	(0)
1960–1961	Morton	9	(0)

International career
1951	Scotland Amateurs	1	(0)
- * Club domestic league appearances and goals

Thomas Henaughen (25 July 1930 – 6 May 2017) was a Scottish professional footballer who made over 130 appearances in the Scottish League for Kilmarnock as a forward.

== Career ==
Henaughen played in the Scottish League for Queen's Park and Morton and was capped by Scotland at amateur level. After his retirement from football, Henaughen worked as a scout for Kilmarnock.

== Personal life ==
Henaughen attended St Mungo's Academy. He died on 6 May 2017, at the age of 86, at Erskine Care Home, Edinburgh. Henaughen's wife of 62 years, Margaret, died four days later.

== Honours ==
Kilmarnock

- Scottish League Second Division second-place promotion: 1953–54

== Career statistics ==
Appearances and goals by club, season and competition
Club	Season	League			National Cup		League Cup		Other		Total	
Club	Season	Division	Apps	Goals	Apps	Goals	Apps	Goals	Apps	Goals	Apps	Goals
Queen's Park	1949–50	Scottish Second Division	1	0	0	0	0	0	1 (Note: Appearance in Glasgow Merchants Charity Cup)	0	2	0
Queen's Park	1950–51	Scottish Second Division	9	2	0	0	0	0	1 (Note: Appearance in Glasgow Cup)	0	10	2
Queen's Park	Total		10	2	0	0	0	0	2	0	12	2
Kilmarnock	1951–52	Scottish Second Division	16	3	0	0	6	0	—		22	3
Kilmarnock	1952–53	Scottish Second Division	27	6	3	1	2	0	—		32	6
Kilmarnock	1953–54	Scottish Second Division	30	13	2	1	8	0	—		40	14
Kilmarnock	1954–55	Scottish First Division	23	5	3	1	4	0	—		30	6
Kilmarnock	1955–56	Scottish First Division	3	0	0	0	4	0	—		7	0
Kilmarnock	1957–58	Scottish First Division	19	1	0	0	0	0	—		19	1
Kilmarnock	1958–59	Scottish First Division	11	3	0	0	8	2	—		19	3
Kilmarnock	1959–60	Scottish First Division	5	0	0	0	3	1	—		8	1
Kilmarnock	Total		134	31	8	3	35	3	—		177	37
Career total			144	33	8	3	35	3	2	0	189	39
