= Charlie McNeil (footballer) =

Scottish footballer

Personal information
- Date of birth: 11 March 1963
- Place of birth: Stirling, Scotland
- Date of death: 11 December 2016 (aged 53)
- Position: Winger

Senior career*
Years	Team	Apps	(Gls)
- Grangemouth International
1980–1985	Stirling Albion	115	(9)
- Kilsyth Rangers
- * Club domestic league appearances and goals

Charlie McNeil (11 March 1963 – 11 December 2016) was a Scottish professional footballer who played for Grangemouth International, Stirling Albion and Kilsyth Rangers, as a winger.
