= Matt Murray (Scottish footballer) =

Scottish footballer

Personal information
- Full name: Matthew Murray
- Date of birth: 25 December 1929
- Place of birth: Paisley, Scotland
- Date of death: 28 April 2016 (aged 86)
- Position: Outside left

Youth career
- Camelon Juniors

Senior career*
Years	Team	Apps	(Gls)
1947–1952	Queen's Park	19	(3)
1952–1956	Kilmarnock	74	(15)
1956	Raith Rovers	0	(0)
1956–1957	Ayr United	11	(1)
1957–1958	St Mirren	3	(0)
1958–1959	Barrow	33	(2)
1959–1960	Carlisle United	28	(4)
1960	Morton	8	(5)

International career
1952	Scotland Amateurs	4	(1)
1952	Great Britain	2	(0)
- * Club domestic league appearances and goals

Matthew Murray (25 December 1929 – 28 April 2016) was a Scottish professional footballer who played as an outside forward in the Scottish League for Kilmarnock, Queen's Park, Ayr United, Morton and St Mirren. He was capped by Scotland Amateurs and Great Britain. Murray also played in the Football League for Barrow and Carlisle United.
