= Redding, Falkirk =

Coordinates: 55.989°N 03.727°W

Redding: Scottish Gaelic: Reidean; Scots: Reddin
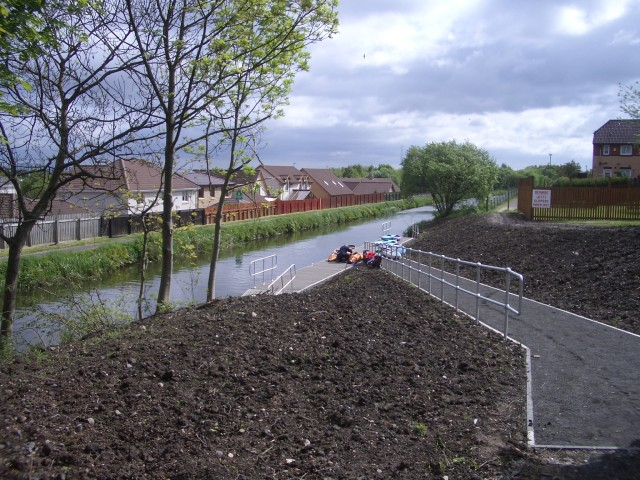
- Slipway to the Union Canal at Redding

- Location within the Falkirk council area
- Population: 3,860 (2020)
- OS grid reference: NS923786
  - Edinburgh: 21.2 mi (34.1 km) ESE
  - London: 343 mi (552 km) SSE
- Civil parish: Grangemouth
- Council area: Falkirk
- Lieutenancy area: Stirling and Falkirk
- Country: Scotland
- Sovereign state: United Kingdom
- Post town: Falkirk
- Postcode district: FK2
- Dialling code: 01324
- Police: Scotland
- Fire: Scottish
- Ambulance: Scottish
- UK Parliament: Falkirk
- Scottish Parliament: Falkirk East
- Website: falkirk.gov.uk

Redding is a village within the Falkirk council area in Central Scotland. The village is 2.1 miles (3.4 km) southeast of Falkirk, 1.9 miles (3.1 km) south-southwest of Grangemouth and 1 mile (1.6 km) west of Polmont.

At the time of the 2001 census, Redding had a population of 1,954 residents.

== History ==
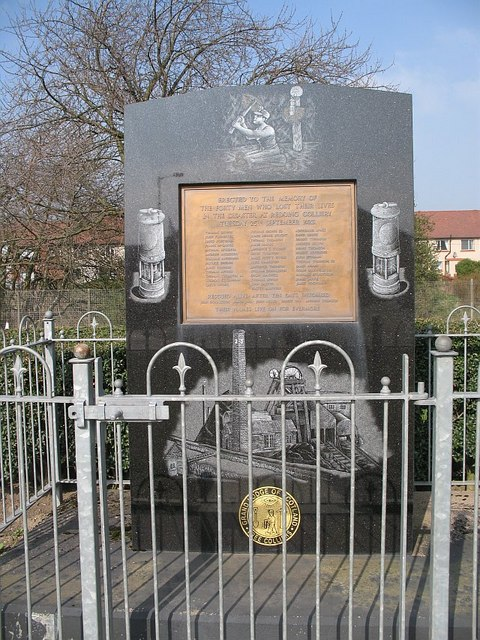
Redding Colliery Memorial 25 September 1923

On a hill beyond Redding is a stone that is called Wallace's stone, marking out the spot from which Sir William Wallace, after his quarrel with Sir John Stuart, one of the Scottish chiefs, is said to have viewed the Battle of Falkirk, from which he had been compelled to retire, and to have witnessed the defeat of the Scottish army. The village is one of the older settlements in the area and is shown on Timothy Pont's map of Stirlingshire from around 1590.

In 1923, the small mining community was the scene of the Redding mining disaster, one of the worst disasters in the history of the Scottish coalfield, which claimed the lives of 40 men. At 5.00am on Tuesday 25 September 1923 an inrush of water flooded the pit. This trapped 66 miners underground, 21 of whom were successfully rescued after about five hours. A further five men were rescued after having been trapped in the mine for 10 days. A further 11 men survived for around two weeks in a dry section of the mine, but ultimately died before rescuers were able to free them. The Sir William Wallace Lodge of the Grand Lodge of Scotland Free Colliers still march every year on the first Saturday in August in memory of the men who lost their lives in the disaster. In 2023 the 100th anniversary of the disaster was marked by a march and ceremony to rededicate the memorial stone, with relatives of those killed traveling from Australia and North America to attend.

== Sport ==
In the late 1880s, the village had an association football club, Redding Athletic F.C., which entered the Scottish Cup and the Stirlingshire Cup, without any success.

== See also ==
- Falkirk Braes villages
- List of places in Falkirk council area
