= Ralph Collins =

Scottish footballer and manager

Personal information
- Full name: Ralph Clark Collins
- Date of birth: 16 April 1924
- Place of birth: Airdrie, Scotland
- Date of death: March 2007 (aged 82)
- Place of death: Airdrie, Scotland
- Position: Defender

Senior career*
Years	Team	Apps	(Gls)
–	Shettleston		
1942–1948	Airdrieonians	0	(0)
1948–1949	East Stirlingshire		
1949–1959	Kilmarnock	246	(1)

Managerial career
- 1967–1970: Airdrieonians
- * Club domestic league appearances and goals

Ralph Clark Collins (16 April 1924 – March 2007) was a Scottish football player and manager.

== Bio ==
He played as a defender for Airdrieonians, East Stirlingshire and Kilmarnock, making 325 appearances for the Ayrshire club. Collins captained Kilmarnock in the 1957 Scottish Cup Final.

After retiring as a player, Collins was manager of Airdrie, but resigned from that post in October 1970 due to the pressure of also working shift patterns in another job.
