= Ken Currie (footballer) =

Scottish footballer (1925–2017)

Ken Currie (3 September 1925 – 22 March 2017) was a Scottish footballer who played as a forward. Currie played for Hearts, Third Lanark, Raith Rovers, Dunfermline Athletic and Stranraer.
