= John Prentice (footballer, born 1926) =

Scottish footballer and manager (1926–2006)

Personal information
- Full name: John Prentice
- Date of birth: 2 August 1926
- Place of birth: Shotts, Scotland
- Date of death: 10 February 2006 (aged 79)
- Place of death: Australia
- Position: Wing half

Youth career
- 1942–1944: Carluke Rovers

Senior career*
Years	Team	Apps	(Gls)
1944–1950	Heart of Midlothian	6	(0)
1950–1956	Rangers	96	(18)
1956–1959	Falkirk	82	(5)
1959–1960	Dumbarton	9	(1)
Total		193	(24)

International career
1953	Scottish Football League XI	1	(0)

Managerial career
- 1960–1962: Arbroath
- 1962–1966: Clyde
- 1966: Scotland
- 1966–1968: Falkirk
- 1968–1971: Dundee
- 1973–1975: Falkirk
- * Club domestic league appearances and goals

John Prentice (2 August 1926 – 10 February 2006) was a Scottish football player and manager. He played for Heart of Midlothian, Rangers, Falkirk and Dumbarton, and managed Arbroath, Falkirk, Dundee, Clyde and Scotland.

== Club career ==
Prentice was born in Shotts, Lanarkshire. After playing for the non-league club Carluke Rovers, Prentice signed for Hearts in 1944. A defender, he played for the Edinburgh side for seven years, before signing for Rangers in 1951 for £7000. He joined Falkirk in 1956 and the high point of his playing career was captaining Falkirk to their Scottish Cup triumph over Kilmarnock in the 1957 Scottish Cup Final. He left Falkirk in 1959 and signed for Dumbarton, where he finished his playing career. He also played for the Scottish League representative team.

== Managerial career ==
=== Arbroath ===
Prentice began his managerial career at the age of 33 in April 1960, when he was appointed as manager of relegated First Division side Arbroath and took up his post for the final two games of the 1959–60 season. In his first full season (1960–61), Arbroath finished in 12th place in the 19 team Second Division after he had controversially sold top striker Dave Easson to Raith Rovers. In his second season, after a good start to the season, they finished in 6th place. Prentice suddenly resigned as manager in September 1962. No official reason was given for his exit, but a few weeks before his departure, Arbroath Town Council had refused to allocate him a house on the grounds that his job was not considered to be that of a 'key worker'.

=== Clyde ===
In November 1962, he was appointed as manager of Clyde. In his first half-season he was unable to stop Clyde being relegated, but in 1964 he guided them to promotion as Second Division runners-up. In the 1964–65 season Clyde finished seventh in the eighteen team First Division and also played well in the following season.

=== Scotland national team ===
The quality of his team's performances and his management talents were recognized when, in March 1966, he was appointed as full-time manager of Scotland. He succeeded Jock Stein, who had managed the side on a part-time basis in addition to his post at Celtic. Prentice took charge of four games between April and June in 1966, all played at Hampden Park. Scotland suffered defeats by England, the Netherlands and Portugal, but recorded a 1–1 draw with reigning world champions Brazil in his last game. This meant that Prentice statistically held the worst record of any Scotland manager in his first four matches in charge, until Berti Vogts lost his first five matches in charge.

=== Later Club career ===
Prentice returned to club management with his old club Falkirk in October 1966. He later managed Dundee, his only experience of managing in European competition but left in 1972 to return to Falkirk where he remained until 1975.

== Personal life ==
Prentice had two sons who were active in Scottish football. Alan played for Meadowbank Thistle and Hamilton Academical. Doug refereed at the highest level in Scotland and in Australia.

== Retirement ==
Prentice emigrated to Australia in the 1970s. He died in February 2006 of a brain tumour, aged 79.

== Honours ==
=== Player ===
Rangers

- Scottish Football League : 1952–53, 1955–56
- Scottish Cup : 1952–53

Falkirk

- Scottish Cup : 1956–57

=== Manager ===
Clyde

- Scottish Second Division promotion: 1963–64

Dundee

- Forfarshire Cup : 1970–71

Falkirk

- Stirlingshire Cup : 1966–67, 1967–68
- Scottish Second Division : 1974–75

=== Managerial statistics ===
As of 28 March 2015

Team	Nat	From	To	Record				
Team	Nat	From	To	G	W	D	L	Win %
Scotland	(Scotland)	1966	1966	4	0	1	3	0.00
