= 1953–54 Scottish Division B =

Scottish Division B
- Season: 1953–54
- Champions: Motherwell
- Promoted: Motherwell; Kilmarnock

The 1953–54 Scottish Division B was won by Motherwell who, along with second placed Kilmarnock, were promoted to First Division A. Dumbarton finished bottom and were relegated to Division C.

== Table ==
Pos	Team	Pld	W	D	L	GF	GA	GD	Pts	Promotion or relegation
1	Motherwell	30	21	3	6	109	43	+66	45	Promotion to the 1954–55 Division A
2	Kilmarnock	30	19	4	7	71	39	+32	42	Promotion to the 1954–55 Division A
3	Third Lanark	30	13	10	7	78	48	+30	36	
4	Stenhousemuir	30	14	8	8	66	58	+8	36	
5	Morton	30	15	3	12	85	65	+20	33	
6	St Johnstone	30	14	3	13	80	71	+9	31	
7	Albion Rovers	30	12	7	11	55	63	−8	31	
8	Dunfermline Athletic	30	11	9	10	48	57	−9	31	
9	Ayr United	30	11	8	11	50	56	−6	30	
10	Queen's Park	30	9	9	12	56	51	+5	27	
11	Alloa Athletic	30	7	10	13	50	72	−22	24	
12	Forfar Athletic	30	10	4	16	38	69	−31	24	
13	Cowdenbeath	30	9	5	16	67	81	−14	23	
14	Arbroath	30	8	7	15	53	67	−14	23	
15	Dundee United	30	8	6	16	54	79	−25	22	
16	Dumbarton	30	7	8	15	51	92	−41	22	Relegated to the 1954–55 Division C South West Section

Source: "1953-1954 Division B - SPFL Archive". SPFL.
