= David Burns (footballer, born 1934) =

Scottish footballer

Personal information
- Date of birth: 13 March 1934 (age 92)
- Place of birth: Buckhaven, Scotland
- Date of death: 29 November 2010
- Place of death: Linlithgow, Scotland
- Position: Left winger

Youth career
- Petershill

Senior career*
Years	Team	Apps	(Gls)
1956–1960	Kilmarnock	49	(9)
1960–1961	St Johnstone	15	(2)
1961	Arbroath		
1961–1962	East Fife	16	(4)
- St. Andrews United
Total		80	(15)
- * Club domestic league appearances and goals

David Burns (13 March 1934 – 29 November 2010) was a Scottish footballer who played in the Scottish Football League for Kilmarnock, St Johnstone, Arbroath and East Fife.
