= Tommy Murray (footballer, born February 1933) =

Scottish footballer (1933–2019)

Personal information
- Full name: Thomas Murray
- Date of birth: 5 February 1933
- Place of birth: Airdrie, Scotland
- Date of death: 31 December 2019 (aged 86)
- Place of death: Airdrie, Scotland
- Position: Inside forward

Senior career*
Years	Team	Apps	(Gls)
1955–1956	Headington United	12	(0)
1956–1957	Darlington	3	(0)
1956–1957	→ St Johnstone (loan)	0	(0)
1957	Alloa Athletic	5	(0)
1957	Albion Rovers	2	(0)
1957–1958	Stranraer	1	(0)
- * Club domestic league appearances and goals

Thomas Murray (5 February 1933 – 31 December 2019), known as Tom or Tommy Murray, was a Scottish footballer who played as an inside forward in the Football League for Darlington, in the Scottish League for St Johnstone, Alloa Athletic, Albion Rovers and Stranraer, and in the Southern League for Headington United. Murray died in Airdrie on 31 December 2019 at the age of 86.
