= Tommy Murray (footballer, born 1943) =

Scottish footballer (1943–2025)

Thomas Murray (1 June 1943 – 26 November 2025) was a Scottish footballer, who played as a midfielder and forward.

== Career ==
Murray started his career with Airdrieonians in 1960, where he made nearly 200 appearances. He also had long spells at Carlisle United and Heart of Midlothian. Murray arrived in Hong Kong on 2nd September 1975 and was announced as a HK Rangers FC player. He was due to sign for Eastern AA, but there were contract complications.He moved to Caroline Hill FC in 1977 where he was a member of the Viceroy Cup winning team that year. He also played for the representative side, the Hong Kong League XI. He later moved to Australia where he played for Brisbane City, Arbroath, and Raith Rovers.

He was inducted into the Airdrieonians Hall of Fame.

== Personal life and death ==
Murray settled in Linlithgow in later life, and died on 25 November 2025, at the age of 82.
