= Thomas Murray (footballer) =

English footballer

Personal information
- Full name: Thomas Murray
- Date of birth: 7 April 1889
- Place of birth: Middlesbrough, England
- Date of death: 1976 (aged 86–87)
- Height: 5 ft 9 in (1.75 m)
- Position: Inside right

Senior career*
| Years | Team | Apps | (Gls) |
| 1905–1907 | Middlesbrough | 12 | (2) |
| 1907–1908 | Aberdeen | 32 | (14) |
| 1908–1909 | Rangers | 14 | (11) |
| 1909–1911 | Aberdeen | 44 | (15) |
| 1911–1912 | Heart of Midlothian | 28 | (12) |
| 1912–1914 | Bradford City | 6 | (1) |
| 1914 | Hull City | 2 | (0) |
| Total | | 138 | (55) |
- * Club domestic league appearances and goals

Thomas Murray (7 April 1889 – 1976) was an English professional footballer who played as an inside right.

== Career ==
Born in Middlesbrough, Murray spent his early career with Middlesbrough, Aberdeen, Rangers and Heart of Midlothian. At Hearts he scored 12 goals in 28 league games between August 1911 and April 1912. He joined Bradford City in June 1912. He made 6 league appearances for Bradford City, scoring 1 goal. He left the club in February 1914 to join Hull City. For Hull he made a further 2 league appearances before retiring due to injury. He died in 1976.

== Sources ==
- Frost, Terry (1988). Bradford City A Complete Record 1903-1988. Breedon Books Sport. ISBN 0-907969-38-0.
