= Tommy Murray (footballer, born January 1933) =

Scottish footballer (1933–2026)

Personal information
- Full name: Thomas Murray
- Date of birth: 14 January 1933
- Place of birth: Bellshill, Scotland
- Date of death: 19 August 2026 (aged 93)
- Position: Outside right

Senior career*
Years	Team	Apps	(Gls)
- Dalry Thistle
1956–1960	Falkirk	78	(13)
1959–1960	Queen of the South	9	(6)
1960–1961	Leeds United	7	(2)
1960–1962	Tranmere Rovers	10	(1)
1962–1963	Queen of the South	12	(4)
Total		116	(26)
- * Club domestic league appearances and goals

Thomas Murray (14 January 1933 – 19 August 2026) was a Scottish footballer, who played as an outside right in both the Scottish and English football leagues.

== Career ==
Murray began his career at Junior level with Dalry Thistle and in 1955 was capped for the Scotland Junior international side. On stepping up to Falkirk in 1956, Murray won the Scottish Cup in his first season with a man of the match performance in the replayed final against Kilmarnock. Falkirk were relegated in 1959 and Murray moved on during the following season to Queen of the South.

He transferred for £3,000 to Leeds United in August 1960. His spell in Yorkshire was hampered by injury plus competition for his place from rising star Billy Bremner. Murray left for Tranmere Rovers in March 1961 with Leeds recouping their fee however he made only 10 league appearances before returning to Queen of the South to finish his career.
