= Willie Harvey (footballer) =

Scottish footballer

Personal information
- Full name: William James Harvey
- Date of birth: 23 November 1929
- Place of birth: Clydebank, Scotland
- Date of death: 12 June 2014 (aged 84)
- Place of death: Bishopton, Scotland
- Position: Inside forward

Senior career*
Years	Team	Apps	(Gls)
- Bridgeton Waverley
1951–1958	Kilmarnock	150	(42)
1958–1959	Dunfermline	3	(0)
1958–1960	Bradford Park Avenue	26	(1)
1960–1961	Arbroath	9	(0)
1961–1962	Bangor	1	(0)
1962	Inverness Caledonian		
1962–1963	Sydney Prague		
1963–1964	Derry City	1	(0)
1964–1965	Austral		
- * Club domestic league appearances and goals

William James Harvey (23 November 1929 – 12 June 2014) was a Scottish footballer.
