= 1956–57 Scottish Cup =

Tournament details
- Country: Scotland

Final positions
- Champions: Falkirk
- Runners-up: Kilmarnock

The 1956–57 Scottish Cup was the 72nd staging of Scotland's most prestigious football knockout competition. The Cup was won by Falkirk who defeated Kilmarnock in the replayed final.

== First round ==
Home team	Score	Away team
Albion Rovers	8 – 2	Vale of Atholl
Arbroath	10 – 2	Rothes
Babcock & Wilcox	6 – 3	Selkirk
Buckie Thistle	4 – 0	Lossiemouth
Chirnside United	1 – 9	Montrose
Civil Service Strollers	0 – 7	Clachnacuddin
Coldstream	6 – 0	Whithorn
Edinburgh University	1 – 11	Duns
Elgin City	5 – 1	Shawfield Amateurs
Eyemouth United	3 – 2	Burntisland Shipyard
Forres Mechanics	6 – 1	Keith
Fraserburgh	5 – 2	Deveronvale
Peebles Rovers	4 – 2	Murrayfield Amateurs
Peterhead	4 – 2	Huntly
Ross County	6 – 3	Aberdeen University
Tarff Rovers	1 – 7	Inverness Caledonian
Vale of Leithen	6 – 1	Glasgow University
Wick Academy	3 – 1	Girvan Amateurs
Wigtown & Bladnoch	1 – 4	Brora Rangers

== Second round ==
Home team	Score	Away team
Arbroath	6 – 1	Brora Rangers
Babcock & Wilcox	0 – 2	Inverness Caledonian
Elgin City	2 – 2	Clachnacuddin
Eyemouth United	3 – 1	Duns
Fraserburgh	9 – 0	Gala Fairydean
Montrose	2 – 4	Buckie Thistle
Peebles Rovers	2 – 2	Albion Rovers
Peterhead	2 – 3	Forres Mechanics
Ross County	6 – 0	Coldstream
Vale of Leithen	7 – 2	Wick Academy

=== Replays ===
Home team	Score	Away team
Albion Rovers	6 – 0	Peebles Rovers
Clachnacuddin	3 – 2	Elgin City

== Third round ==
Home team	Score	Away team
Buckie Thistle	9 – 2	Newton Stewart
Clachnacuddin	1 – 4	East Stirlingshire
Eyemouth United	0 – 3	Nairn County
Forfar Athletic	3 – 1	Arbroath
Fraserburgh	0 – 2	Forres Mechanics
Inverness Thistle	0 – 2	Ross County
St Cuthbert Wanderers	2 – 7	Inverness Caledonian
Vale of Leithen	0 – 2	Albion Rovers

== Fourth round ==
Home team	Score	Away team
Alloa Athletic	4 – 0	Forfar Athletic
Buckie Thistle	2 – 3	Hamilton Academical
Cowdenbeath	3 – 5	Inverness Caledonian
Dundee United	5 – 2	Third Lanark
East Stirlingshire	1 – 1	Greenock Morton
Forres Mechanics	3 – 0	Albion Rovers
Nairn County	5 – 5	Berwick Rangers
Stranraer	3 – 0	Ross County

=== Replays ===
Home team	Score	Away team
Berwick Rangers	3 – 0	Nairn County
Greenock Morton	4 – 1	East Stirlingshire

== Fifth round ==
Home team	Score	Away team
Berwick Rangers	1 – 2	Falkirk
Dundee	0 – 0	Clyde
Dunfermline Athletic	3 – 0	Greenock Morton
East Fife	4 – 0	St Johnstone
Forres Mechanics	0 – 5	Celtic
Hamilton Academical	2 – 2	Alloa Athletic
Hearts	0 – 4	Rangers
Hibernian	3 – 4	Aberdeen
Inverness Caledonian	2 – 3	Raith Rovers
Kilmarnock	1 – 0	Ayr United
Queen of the South	2 – 2	Dumbarton
Queen's Park	3 – 0	Brechin City
St Mirren	1 – 1	Partick Thistle
Stenhousemuir	1 – 1	Dundee United
Stirling Albion	1 – 2	Motherwell
Stranraer	1 – 2	Airdrieonians

=== Replays ===
Home team	Score	Away team
Alloa Athletic	3 – 5	Hamilton Academical
Clyde	2 – 1	Dundee
Dumbarton	4 – 2	Queen of the South
Dundee United	4 – 0	Stenhousemuir
Partick Thistle	2 – 2	St Mirren

=== Second Replays ===
Home team	Score	Away team
St Mirren	5 – 1	Partick Thistle

== Sixth Round ==
Home team	Score	Away team
Celtic	4 – 4	Rangers
East Fife	0 – 0	Kilmarnock
Falkirk	3 – 1	Aberdeen
Hamilton Academical	1 – 2	Airdrieonians
Motherwell	1 – 3	Dumbarton
Queen's Park	1 – 1	Clyde
Raith Rovers	7 – 0	Dundee United
St Mirren	1 – 0	Dunfermline Athletic

=== Replays ===
Home team	Score	Away team
Clyde	2 – 1	Queen's Park
Kilmarnock	2 – 0	East Fife
Rangers	0 – 2	Celtic

== Quarter-finals ==
Home team	Score	Away team
Celtic	2 – 1	St Mirren
Dumbarton	0 – 4	Raith Rovers
Falkirk	2 – 1	Clyde
Kilmarnock	3 – 1	Airdrieonians

== Semi-finals ==
23 March 1957

Celtic	1–1	Kilmarnock

Hampden Park, Glasgow
Attendance: 109,145

23 March 1957

Falkirk	2–2	Raith Rovers

Tynecastle Stadium, Edinburgh
Attendance: 48,275

=== Replays ===
27 March 1957

Kilmarnock	3–1	Celtic

Hampden Park, Glasgow
Attendance: 76,963

27 March 1957

Falkirk	2–0	Raith Rovers

Tynecastle Stadium, Edinburgh
Attendance: 48,275

== Final ==
20 April 1957

Falkirk	1–1	Kilmarnock
Prentice 33' (pen.)		Curlett 45+1'

Hampden Park, Glasgow
Attendance: 81,375
Referee: Jack Mowat

=== Replay ===
24 April 1957

Falkirk	2–1 (a.e.t.)	Kilmarnock
Merchant 24'; Moran 101'		Curlett 78'

Hampden Park, Glasgow
Attendance: 79,960
Referee: Jack Mowat
