= Falkirk F.C. =

Association football club in Scotland

Falkirk
- Full name: Falkirk Football Club
- Nickname: The Bairns
- Founded: 1876; 150 years ago
- Ground: Falkirk Stadium
- Capacity: 7,937
- Coordinates: 56°0′19″N 3°45′10″W
- Owner: Falkirk Supporters Society
- CEO: Jamie Swinney
- Manager: John McGlynn
- League: Scottish Premiership
- 2025–26: Scottish Premiership, 6th of 12
- Website: www.falkirkfc.co.uk
| Home colours | Away colours |

Falkirk Football Club is a Scottish professional association football club based in the town of Falkirk. The club was founded in 1876 and competes in the Scottish Premiership, the top tier of Scottish football, as a member of the Scottish Professional Football League. The club was elected to the Second Division of the Scottish Football League in 1902–03, was promoted to the First Division after two seasons and achieved its highest league position in the early 1900s when it was runner-up to Celtic in 1907–08 and 1909–10. The football club was registered as a Limited Liability Company in April 1905 – Falkirk Football & Athletic Club Ltd.

Falkirk won the Scottish Cup for the first time in 1913. After 1945, Falkirk were promoted and demoted between the Premier and First Divisions seven times until 1995–96, and during the 1970s spent three seasons in the Second Division. In 2005, Falkirk gained promotion to the Scottish Premier League (SPL). Falkirk won the Scottish Cup again in 1957 and were runners-up in the competition in 1997, 2009 and 2015. As a result of their performance in the 2009 Scottish Cup, the club qualified for the inaugural season of the UEFA Europa League in 2009–10. Falkirk have won the second tier of Scottish football a record eight times. They are also joint-record winners of the Scottish Challenge Cup, winning it for the fourth time in 2012.

In their early years, Falkirk played at three venues: Hope Street, Randyford Park and Blinkbonny Park. Between 1885 and 2003, the club was based at Brockville Park, built on the former Hope Street ground. After the creation of the SPL in 1998, its strict stadium criteria – to which Brockville Park did not conform – was enforced, and the club was denied promotion on three occasions. The club's present home ground since 2004 is the Falkirk Stadium, a 7,937 all-seater stadium in the Westfield area of Falkirk. The club's nickname is the Bairns, a Scots word meaning sons or daughters, which is given to natives of the town of Falkirk.

== History ==
=== Club formation and early years ===
The club's date of formation is uncertain. Although some accounts point to the year 1876, others claim it was formed in 1877. However, the former is the date used by the club and its fans. In 1878, the club joined the Scottish Football Association, and became eligible to compete in the Scottish Cup, a knockout tournament which became the country's main association football cup competition. The club reached the second round in the first year that it competed. In the first few years after it was formed, Falkirk played mostly friendly games. They played their home matches at three different grounds during this period; Hope Street, Randyford Park and Blinkbonny Park. It left the latter in 1884 and moved to Brockville Park, which remained the club's home ground for 118 years. The Stirlingshire Football Association was founded in 1883, which invited clubs from the Stirlingshire region to join. It resulted in the establishment of a new tournament, the Stirlingshire Cup, a competition open exclusively to the teams from the region, which Falkirk won in its inaugural season. This is reflected in the Falkirk Burgh motto: "Better meddle wi' the de'il than the Bairns o' Fa'kirk".

=== Election to the Football League ===
After playing mostly regional matches, friendly games and the nationwide Scottish Cup tournament for the majority of its existence, the club was elected to the bottom tier of the Scottish Football League in 1902–03, a national sports league consisting of Scotland's top football clubs. At the time, the league consisted of two tiers, the First and Second Divisions. Falkirk was promoted to the top division with a second-place finish behind Clyde after two seasons. Despite the club's success, several months beforehand a proposal to merge with local rivals East Stirlingshire was raised, which was narrowly rejected in a vote. In 1907–08, Falkirk's third season in the top flight, the club finished the season in second place, its highest league position to date, and repeated this in the 1909–10 season. On both occasions it finished behind champions Celtic despite being the top goal scorers in the league, becoming the first Scottish club to break the 100 goals barrier in a single season. In 1913, the club won the Scottish Cup for the first time, defeating Raith Rovers in the final 2–0.

In 1922, the club broke the world record transfer fee, paying £5000 for the transfer of striker Syd Puddefoot from English club West Ham United. The following year, the club played against the Scottish Football League XI to raise funds for those affected by the Redding mine disaster.

Falkirk spent 30 consecutive seasons in their first spell in the top flight of Scottish football, before being relegated in 1934–35 after finishing 20th at the bottom of the league. Despite this, the club was promoted to the top flight after one season, as champions of the 1935–36 Second Division, amassing a club record of 132 league goals in the process. Falkirk remained in the top flight until the outbreak of World War II in 1939, when the league was suspended.

=== Post-war promotion and demotion ===
After the war ended in 1945, the Scottish Football League resumed and Falkirk regained its place in the First Division for the 1946–47 season. In 1947, a new competition, the Scottish League Cup, was inaugurated. In the 1947–48 season, Falkirk reached the final, and lost 4–1 to East Fife in the replayed final after an initial 0–0 draw.

The club competed in the final of the Scottish Cup in 1957. They defeated Kilmarnock in a replay. This was their first success in the tournament since winning it 44 years earlier. In June 1958 Alex Parker and Eddie O'Hara from the cup winning side were bought by Everton for a combined fee or £18,000. John White was signed two months later from Alloa Athletic with £3,300 of that money.

In the years to follow, relegation and promotion between the first and second tiers occurred seven times until the 1995–96 season. The club spent eight consecutive seasons at a time in either division. As a result, Falkirk has won or finished runners-up in the second tier of Scottish football a record 14 times, the majority occurring in this period. The club also spent three seasons in the late 1970s in the newly created third tier, the lowest tier it has competed in. In 1977–78 the club finished in its lowest ranking to date, ending the season in the equivalent of 29th in Scotland following a 5th-place finish in the new Second Division. In the 1996–97 season, the club reached the final of the Scottish Cup for the third time, and Falkirk became the seventh club in 106 years to reach the final whilst competing outside the top league of Scottish football. Falkirk's opponents were Kilmarnock, a repeat of the 1957 final, but the club could not match its 1957 success and lost 1–0.

=== Scottish Premier League ===
The Scottish Premier League (SPL) was founded in 1998 as the new top flight of Scottish football. The new league and its rules denied Falkirk the chance to be promoted into it on three occasions as a consequence of its formation. When the SPL was created from the old Premier Division, a play-off match that was held between the team ranked ninth in the Premier Division and the team ranked second in the First Division was abolished during the 1997–98 season. Falkirk, ranked second in the First Division, was thus denied a play-off with Motherwell. The SPL's criterion that clubs required a 10,000 capacity all-seater stadium in order to compete in the new league, which Falkirk's Brockville Park did not comply with, was introduced. When the SPL was due to expand to 12 teams at the end of the 1999–2000 season, Aberdeen, which finished bottom of the SPL, would have competed in a three-way play-off against the teams that finished second and third in the First Division, and two of these three clubs would gain SPL status for the next season. Brockville Park was still below the SPL criterion, and Falkirk applied to ground-share Murrayfield Stadium in Edinburgh, but the proposal was rejected. The play-off was abandoned, Dunfermline Athletic was automatically promoted and Aberdeen retained its status in the top flight.

Historic chart of table positions of Falkirk in the League.

Following four successive top three finishes in the First Division since 1997–98, the club's fortunes changed dramatically and it finished the season in ninth position, which would have qualified the club to be relegated to the third tier. However, it was spared relegation by the liquidation of fellow First Division club Airdrieonians on the last day of the season. The following season, Falkirk was again denied promotion to the SPL despite finishing top of the First Division. The club submitted another application to ground-share, this time at New Broomfield – an SPL compliant stadium and the home of Airdrie United – but was rejected in a vote by SPL chairmen. Motherwell was thus spared relegation from the First Division. In order to meet the criterion, Falkirk started building a new stadium and left Brockville Park.

During the 2004–05 season, the SPL stadium criterion was reduced to 6,000, which the club's new Falkirk Stadium met. The club won the First Division that season, winning 1–0 to Ross County, and was promoted to the SPL. After three seasons in the SPL, including two seventh-place finishes, the club qualified for the inaugural season of the UEFA Europa League, the first time the club qualified for a European competition. The same year, Falkirk was beaten by Rangers in the final of the Scottish Cup. Despite its cup success, Falkirk finished in 10th place in the league and avoided relegation with a 1–0 win against Inverness Caledonian Thistle. The following season, the club competed in the Europa League but was relegated from the SPL to the First Division after being held to a 0–0 draw against Kilmarnock on the final day of the 2009–10 season.

=== Scottish First Division/Scottish Championship ===
Following its return to the First Division, Falkirk finished the 2010–11 and 2011–12 seasons in third position. As members of the Scottish Football League, the club was eligible to compete in the Scottish Challenge Cup, which it won 1–0 against Hamilton Academical in 2012 to win the cup for a record fourth time. In the same year Falkirk reached the semi-finals of the League Cup, but lost to Celtic. The club had defeated the reigning SPL champions Rangers 3–2 in the third round, and also defeated another top flight club Dundee United on penalties in the quarter-finals.

In 2012–13 Falkirk finished a distant third in the league, 25 points behind champions Partick Thistle, but had a great run in the Scottish Cup, beating local rivals Stenhousemuir as well as Hamilton Academical en route to the semi-final against Hibernian at Hampden Park. Falkirk, under the management of Gary Holt for the first time, took a 3–0 half time lead, though Hibernian made a comeback to confirm their place in the final with a 4–3 win (AET). Gary Holt left the managers post in June 2014 to join Norwich on their coaching team. He was replaced by Peter Houston. In the 2013–14 season Falkirk finished third in the Scottish Championship, narrowly missing out on the title by 3 points having still been in with a chance on the final day of the season. They qualified for the Premiership play-off, where they defeated Queen of the South 4–3 on aggregate (AET) in the quarter-final, before losing to Hamilton Academical 2–1 on aggregate in the semis.

In 2014–15, Falkirk missed out on the play-off places, finishing in 5th place in the championship, Falkirk went one better in the Scottish Cup than two years previously, reaching the final, avenging their loss to Hibernian in the semi-finals before being defeated by Inverness 2–1 in the final. In 2015–16 Falkirk finished second in the Championship and qualified for the promotion play-offs. They defeated Hibernian 5–4 on aggregate in the semi-final before facing Kilmarnock. A 1–0 home win in the first leg put Falkirk on the verge of a return to top flight football. However, Kilmarnock won 4–0 in the second leg to retain their place in the Scottish Premiership 4–1 on aggregate.

The following season, Falkirk again finished second in the league and qualified for the play-offs. They went out to Dundee United 4–3 on aggregate in the semi-finals. Falkirk started the 2017–18 season very badly and the club found themselves in danger of relegation to League One. Manager Peter Houston was sacked in September 2017 following a 2–0 home loss to Livingston, which left the club second bottom of the league. Paul Hartley replaced him as manager. Hartley only won one of his first nine league games, and the club still sat in second bottom, 8 points from guaranteed safety at Christmas. A run of three wins in five games caused Falkirk to draw level on points with third bottom Dumbarton and eventually pull away to finish eighth.

=== Scottish League One ===
Falkirk had a disastrous 2018–19 season which saw the club relegated on the final day, despite running out 3–2 winners against the Champions Ross County. This led to the club's second spell in the Scottish third tier. The 2019–20 season was declared early after 28 games played, leaving Falkirk in second place, 1 point behind Raith Rovers.

The 2020–21 season was another to forget for Falkirk fans. After starting the season on form and seeing themselves clear at the top of the table, a collapse in the second half of the season following a mid-season break due to the COVID-19 pandemic saw Falkirk fall to 5th in League One after a 2–0 defeat to Airdrieonians on the final day cost them a spot in the play-offs.

In the 2022–23 season, they finished second, with Dunfermline Athletic winning the league. The Bairns entered the play-offs against Airdrieonians, only to suffer a 7–2 aggregate loss, losing 6–2 in the first leg and 1–0 in the return.

On 30 March 2024, Falkirk were crowned League One champions without kicking a ball after Hamilton failed to win at home to Queen of the South. On 4 May 2024, Falkirk completed the league season undefeated with a record in the 36-game League One season of won 27, drew 9 and lost zero, achieving only the seventh unbeaten league season across the entire history of Scottish football.

=== Rise up the leagues ===
Falkirk's unbeaten run finally came to an end on 28 September 2024 when they were beaten 1–0 by Raith Rovers at Stark's Park.

2024–2025 Scottish Championship

Having gone invincible in the 23–24 Scottish League One campaign, Falkirk returned to Scottish Championship action by beating Queens Park 2–1 at the Falkirk Stadium in the season curtain-raiser.

Following the departure of winger Callumn Morrison to Linfield for an undisclosed fee, Falkirk signed Scott Arfield from Bolton Wanderers in February of 2025. Arfield had previously played for the club from 2007–2010. Falkirk agreed to un-retire the squad number 37, which Arfield chooses to wear in memory of his friend and former Falkirk teammate Craig Gowans. Arfield scored a hat-trick on his second debut in a 5–2 home win over Partick Thistle on 8 February 2025.

A strong campaign saw Falkirk create a sizeable gap over fellow league contenders Livingston, however a dip in form towards the tail-end of the season meant that Falkirk would go into their final league game level on points with Livingston, but with a far superior goal difference. Falkirk beat Hamilton Academical 3–1 on 2 May 2025 to clinch back-to-back league titles, ensuring a return to the top flight of Scottish football for the first time in 15 years.

2025–2026 Scottish Premiership

Despite being a newly promoted team with one of the division's lowest budgets, Falkirk qualified for the "top six" on 4 April 2026 – guaranteeing a minimum finish of 6th after the top-tier league split into halves.

Additionally, the club reached the Scottish Cup semi-finals, eliminating fellow Premiership sides Dundee United and league leaders Hearts en route.

In late April 2026, Falkirk manager John McGlynn was named on the three man shortlist for PFA Scotland Manager of the Year, marking his third consecutive nomination after winning the award in the two prior seasons.

== Colours and badge ==
The first instance of the navy blue and white strip from 1882

Falkirk's traditional colours are navy blue and white, which the team first wore during the 1882 season. However, the club's first strip, thin blue and white horizontal hoops on the jersey and socks, was worn between 1876 and 1880. This was replaced with a blue jersey and white shorts, which has featured predominantly since. Touches of red were introduced to the strip in the late 1930s – mostly on the socks – was worn until the early 1960s, re-introduced in the mid-1970s and has since been featured in the team's kit. For the 2017–18 season the kit consisted of a navy blue jersey, white shorts and navy socks.

Falkirk's current crest is a stylised version of the Falkirk Steeple, a dominant landmark of the town. During the 2007–08 season the club used a crest – known as "The Highlander" – that was worn during the club's 1957 Scottish Cup win as a 50th anniversary tribute to the players. Kit manufacturer Umbro supplied the club's kit for the 1977–78 season. Other kits have been supplied by Bukta, Patrick and Le Coq Sportif. The current supplier is O'Neill's and the club's shirt sponsor is Crunchy Carrots. Recent sponsors include Central Demolition, Budweiser Budvar, John R Weir Mercedes Group and Beazer Homes.

== Stadiums ==
In the club's early years, Falkirk played its home games at three different sites: Hope Street, Randyford Park and Blinkbonny Park. The first pitch used by the club was on Hope Street, the location that would become Brockville Park in 1884. The first match at Hope Street was against Grasshoppers from Bonnybridge. After one season, Falkirk moved to Randyford Park, the home of East Stirlingshire Cricket Club during the summer months, in 1878 where the club played its first competitive match, which it won against Campsie Glen of Lennoxtown in the Scottish Cup. The ground was located near Forth Valley College, several hundred yards west of the present Falkirk Stadium. The club played at Blinkbonny Park between 1881 and 1883.

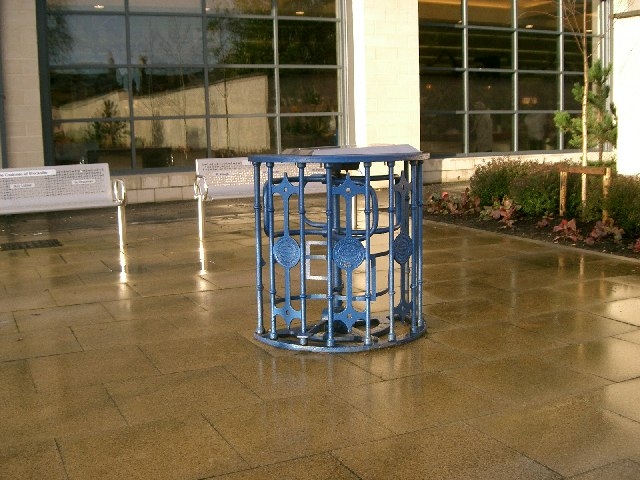
An old turnstile from Brockville

Between 1885 and 2003, Falkirk was based at Brockville Park, which was located a quarter of a mile (0.4 km) from the town centre of Falkirk. Brockville Park was largely terraced and had a capacity of between 7,500 and 8,000 spectators in its later years. On 21 February 1953, Falkirk's largest home attendance was recorded at the ground when 23,100 spectators watched the club play against Celtic in the third round of the Scottish Cup.

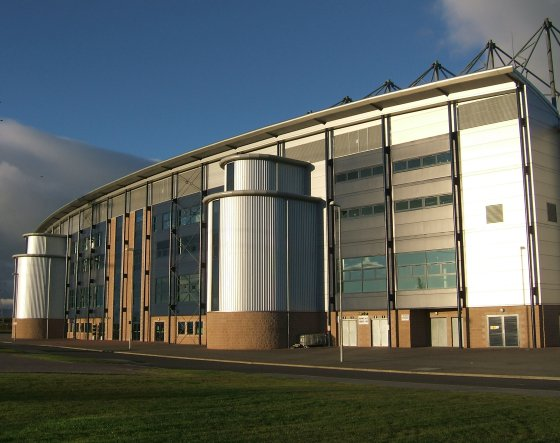
The Falkirk Stadium has been Falkirk's home since 2004.

When the SPL was created in 1998, Brockville Park fell short of the SPL's stadium criteria, mainly because of the terraced stands. As a result, the club was denied entry to the league, despite winning the First Division or qualifying for a promotion play-off, on three occasions. Falkirk remained at the stadium until the last day of the 2002–03 football season, and in late 2003 Brockville was demolished and the site sold to supermarket chain Wm Morrison Supermarkets plc. To commemorate the club's time at the stadium, the supermarket displays Falkirk F.C. memorabilia, including a turnstile. For the 2003–04 season, Falkirk entered an agreement with Stenhousemuir to ground-share Ochilview Park stadium for one season while the club's new stadium was under construction.

Since the beginning of the 2004–05 season, the club has been based at Falkirk Stadium, an 7,937 capacity all-seater stadium built on the eastern outskirts of Falkirk. The stadium was opened in July 2004 with a friendly match against Dundee. When it opened, only the 4,200 capacity west stand was completed. The 2,000 capacity north stand was constructed during the opening season and was completed in May 2005, taking the stadium above the SPL's reduced 6,000 seating criterion. Falkirk became champions of the First Division that season and was promoted to the SPL. The stadium has since been further expanded; the south stand officially opened in a match against Royal Antwerp of Belgium in August 2009.

== Supporters and rivalries ==
Falkirk's strongest recent rivalry is the Kincardine Derby contested with Dunfermline Athletic. Dunfermline and Falkirk are roughly 13 miles apart, separated by the River Forth. Both clubs are a similar size and have regularly competed at the same level in the SPL and First Division but the origin of the rivalry is unclear, as former Falkirk manager John Hughes said in an interview in 2005. The two clubs have played important promotion and relegation encounters against each other over the past thirty years which has only increased the animosity between the two sets of fans.

In 2009 the Falkirk Herald recalled Super Tuesday: "More than 20 years ago a previously postponed league fixture took place at Brockville. The then mighty Dunfermline had come to town expecting victory as they looked to continue their push for promotion from the B&Q First Division. But, for over half of the 9200 supporters that packed the terraces on 7 March 1989, little did they know they would witness a match which would eventually become part of Falkirk folklore. Goals from Derek McWilliams, Paul Rutherford, Sammy McGivern and Stuart Burgess without reply brought the Pars back down to earth with an almighty bang."

A significant match between Falkirk and Dunfermline took place in April 2009, when they met at the semi-final stage of the 2008–09 Scottish Cup at Hampden Park; the Bairns won 2–0 in front of over 17,000 fans to progress to the final.

The club's traditional rival was East Stirlingshire, a club that was also based in Falkirk. The two teams regularly competed against each other in their early existences in the Stirlingshire Cup, as well as in league football following Falkirk's election to the Scottish Football League in 1902–03, two seasons after East Stirlingshire. The last time the clubs played each other in a competitive league fixture was in April 1982, which East Stirlingshire won 3–0, when both clubs were in the First Division. Following East Stirlingshire's relegation that season, the two clubs have not competed in the same league; Falkirk predominantly in the First Division and East Stirlingshire in the Third Division. In 1999–00 the clubs were drawn against each other in the second round of the Scottish League Cup, which Falkirk won 2–0 after extra time was played, the last competitive fixture between the clubs excluding the Stirlingshire Cup.

== Current squad ==
=== First team ===
As of 1 October 2026

Note: Flags indicate national team as defined under FIFA eligibility rules; some limited exceptions apply. Players may hold more than one non-FIFA nationality.

| No. | Pos. | Nation | Player |
|---|---|---|---|
| 1 | GK | SCO | Nicky Hogarth |
| 2 | DF | SCO | Keelan Adams |
| 3 | DF | SCO | Leon McCann |
| 4 | DF | SCO | Jack McMillan |
| 5 | DF | SCO | Liam Henderson |
| 6 | DF | SCO | Coll Donaldson (captain) |
| 7 | FW | ENG | Ben Parkinson |
| 8 | MF | SCO | Brad Spencer (vice-captain) |
| 9 | FW | SCO | Ross MacIver |
| 10 | MF | SCO | Craig Sibbald |
| 11 | FW | NIR | Paul McGovern |
| 12 | FW | SCO | Ethan Laidlaw |
| 14 | MF | SCO | Finn Yeats |
| 15 | DF | SCO | Lewis Neilson |
| 16 | MF | ENG | Finley Barbrook (on loan from Ipswich Town) |

| No. | Pos. | Nation | Player |
|---|---|---|---|
| 17 | DF | ENG | Scott Tanser |
| 18 | FW | IRL | Joe Gardner |
| 19 | GK | SCO | Scott Bain |
| 20 | DF | SCO | Connor Allan |
| 21 | DF | LAT | Deniss Meļņiks |
| 22 | DF | AUS | Ryan Strain |
| 23 | MF | SCO | Ethan Ross |
| 24 | FW | USA | Jacob Murrell |
| 26 | MF | SCO | Aidan Nesbitt |
| 27 | MF | ENG | Conor McLeod (on loan from Wolves) |
| 28 | MF | ENG | Ben Krauhaus (on loan from Brentford) |
| 38 | MF | SCO | Leo Harris |
| 42 | MF | ENG | Owen Eames (on loan from Derby County) |
| 47 | FW | NIR | Aodhan Doherty (on loan from Blackburn Rovers) |
| 99 | FW | USA | CJ Fodrey (on loan from Austin FC) |

=== On loan ===
Note: Flags indicate national team as defined under FIFA eligibility rules; some limited exceptions apply. Players may hold more than one non-FIFA nationality.

| No. | Pos. | Nation | Player |
|---|---|---|---|
| 31 | GK | SCO | Jay Hogarth (on loan at Clyde) |
| 32 | MF | SCO | Kalvin Bennett (co-operation loan with East Stirlingshire) |
| 33 | GK | SCO | Joe Hastings (co-operation loan with East Stirlingshire) |
| 34 | FW | SCO | Kai Brown (co-operation loan with East Stirlingshire) |
| 35 | FW | SCO | Thomas Neil (co-operation loan with East Stirlingshire) |

| No. | Pos. | Nation | Player |
|---|---|---|---|
| 36 | DF | SCO | Stephen Nixon (co-operation loan with East Stirlingshire) |
| — | MF | SCO | Cammie Lawson (on loan at Blackburn United) |
| — | MF | SCO | Casey Lindsay (on loan at Cambuslang Rangers) |
| — | FW | SCO | Ryan Hartie (on loan at Whitburn) |

== Club staff ==
| Position | Name |
|---|---|
| Manager | John McGlynn |
| Assistant manager | Paul Smith |
| First team coach | Stephen McGinn |
| Goalkeeping coach | Robbie Thomson |
| Chief scout | Allan Fraser |
| Head of youth development | Tony Begg |
| Head of physical performance | Blair Doughty |
| Physiotherapists | Cammy McAndrew; Ciaran Sherry |
| Sports scientist | Lewis Collison |
| Sports therapist | Alain Davidson |
| Head of analysis | Matthew Rowan |
| Performance analyst | Andy Tannahill |
| Kitmen | Gary Johnstone; Brian Paterson |

== Managers ==
The club's first manager was Willie Nicol, who was appointed in 1905, before which all manager appointments were assigned to the club secretary. Nicol was first appointed club secretary in 1900, then secretary/manager and finally manager. Nicol is the longest serving manager in Falkirk's history. Alex Totten, manager from 1996 to 2002 who led the side to the 1997 Scottish Cup final, was named the clubs lifetime ambassador ahead of his retirement from football in 2021.

This list does not include caretaker managers or those who managed in a temporary capacity.

Only competitive matches are counted

| Picture | Name | Nationality | From | To | Matches | Won | Drawn | Lost | Win% | Honours | Notes |
|---|---|---|---|---|---|---|---|---|---|---|---|
| | Willie Nicol | Scotland | July 1905 | February 1924 | 732 | 285 | 187 | 260 | 38.93 | 1 Scottish Cup, 2 Division One runners-up, 1 Division Two runners-up | |
| | David Reid | Scotland | February 1924 | October 1927 | 155 | 61 | 37 | 57 | 39.35 | – | |
| | John Richardson | Scotland | November 1927 | May 1932 | 197 | 75 | 35 | 87 | 38.07 | – | |
| | Willie Orr | Scotland | August 1932 | March 1935 | 115 | 42 | 17 | 56 | 36.52 | – | |
| | Tully Craig | Scotland | April 1935 | May 1950 | 577 | 262 | 112 | 203 | 45.41 | 1 Division Two championship, 1 Scottish League Cup runners-up | |
| | Bob Shankly | Scotland | August 1950 | December 1956 | 257 | 88 | 50 | 119 | 34.24 | 1 Division Two runners-up | |
| | Reg Smith | England | January 1957 | May 1959 | 104 | 38 | 23 | 43 | 36.54 | 1 Scottish Cup | |
| | Tommy Younger | Scotland | August 1959 | March 1960 | 39 | 15 | 10 | 14 | 38.46 | – | |
| | Alex McCrae | Scotland | April 1960 | April 1965 | 216 | 77 | 36 | 103 | 35.65 | 1 Division Two runners-up | |
| | Sammy Kean | Scotland | July 1965 | December 1966 | 61 | 21 | 7 | 33 | 34.43 | – | |
| | John Prentice | Scotland | December 1966 | September 1968 | 74 | 18 | 19 | 37 | 24.32 | – | |
| | Willie Cunningham | Northern Ireland | October 1968 | April 1973 | 207 | 80 | 47 | 80 | 38.65 | 1 Division Two championship | |
| | John Prentice | Scotland | August 1973 | August 1975 | 95 | 40 | 18 | 37 | 42.11 | 1 Division Two championship | |
| | George Miller | Scotland | September 1975 | March 1977 | 64 | 19 | 12 | 33 | 29.69 | – | |
| | Billy Little | Scotland | April 1977 | May 1979 | 91 | 36 | 31 | 24 | 39.56 | – | |
| | John Hagart | Scotland | August 1979 | November 1982 | 152 | 51 | 40 | 61 | 33.55 | 1 Second Division championship | |
| | Alex Totten | Scotland | November 1982 | November 1983 | 41 | 20 | 7 | 14 | 48.78 | – | |
| | Gregor Abel | Scotland | November 1982 | November 1983 | 11 | 3 | 1 | 7 | 27.27 | – | |
| | Billy Lamont | Scotland | February 1984 | February 1987 | 131 | 48 | 30 | 53 | 36.64 | 1 First Division runners-up | |
| | Dave Clarke | Scotland | February 1987 | August 1988 | 65 | 12 | 18 | 35 | 18.46 | – | |
| | Jim Duffy | Scotland | September 1988 | October 1989 | 53 | 27 | 11 | 15 | 50.94 | 1 First Division runners-up | |
| | Billy Lamont | Scotland | November 1989 | April 1990 | 21 | 9 | 8 | 4 | 42.86 | – | |
| | Jim Jefferies | Scotland | August 1990 | August 1995 | 237 | 98 | 61 | 78 | 41.35 | 2 First Division championships, 1 Scottish Challenge Cup | |
| | John Lambie | Scotland | August 1995 | March 1996 | 32 | 7 | 5 | 20 | 21.88 | – | |
| | Eamonn Bannon | Scotland | May 1996 | December 1996 | 20 | 9 | 3 | 8 | 45.00 | – | |
| | Alex Totten | Scotland | December 1996 | April 2002 | 240 | 114 | 53 | 73 | 47.50 | 1 Scottish Cup runners-up, 1 Scottish Challenge Cup, 2 First Division runners-up | |
| | Ian McCall | Scotland | May 2002 | January 2003 | 27 | 18 | 6 | 3 | 66.67 | – | |
| | Owen Coyle and John Hughes | Ireland; Scotland | January 2003 | May 2003 | 19 | 12 | 3 | 4 | 63.16 | 1 First Division championship | |
| | John Hughes | Scotland | May 2003 | June 2009 | 263 | 105 | 57 | 101 | 39.92 | 1 First Division championship, 1 Scottish Challenge Cup, 1 Scottish Cup runners-up | |
| | Eddie May | Scotland | June 2009 | February 2010 | 27 | 4 | 8 | 15 | 14.81 | – | |
| | Steven Pressley | Scotland | February 2010 | March 2013 | 105 | 44 | 28 | 33 | 41.90 | 1 Scottish Challenge Cup | |
| | Gary Holt | Scotland | April 2013 | June 2014 | 53 | 26 | 11 | 16 | 49.06 | – | |
| | Peter Houston | Scotland | June 2014 | September 2017 | 153 | 71 | 42 | 40 | 46.41 | – | |
| | Paul Hartley | Scotland | October 2017 | August 2018 | 41 | 17 | 8 | 16 | 41.46 | – | |
| | Ray McKinnon | Scotland | August 2018 | November 2019 | 55 | 17 | 18 | 20 | 30.91 | – | |
| | David McCracken & Lee Miller | Scotland | November 2019 | April 2021 | 43 | 23 | 10 | 10 | 53.49 | – | |
| | Paul Sheerin | Scotland | May 2021 | December 2021 | 23 | 8 | 4 | 11 | 34.78 | – | |
| | Martin Rennie | Scotland | December 2021 | May 2022 | 20 | 6 | 4 | 10 | 30.00 | – | |

^1. Win% is rounded to two decimal places.

== Honours ==
League

- Scottish League (first tier)
  - Runners-up (2): 1907–08, 1909–10
- Scottish First Division / Championship (second tier)
  - Winners (8): 1935–36, 1969–70, 1974–75, 1990–91, 1993–94, 2002–03, 2004–05, 2024–25 (record)
  - Runners-up (9): 1904–05, 1951–52, 1960–61, 1985–86, 1988–89, 1997–98, 1998–99, 2015–16, 2016–17
- Scottish Second Division / Scottish League One (third tier)
  - Winners (2): 1979–80, 2023–24
  - Runners-up (2): 2019–20†, 2022–23

Cup

- Scottish Cup
  - Winners (2): 1913, 1957
  - Runners-up (3): 1997, 2009, 2015
- Scottish League Cup
  - Runners-up (1): 1947–48
- Scottish Challenge Cup
  - Winners (4): 1993, 1997, 2004, 2012 (joint-record)

†The 2019–20 Scottish League One season was declared early after 28 games played due to the COVID-19 outbreak.

== Club records ==
- League victory: 9–0 v Port Glasgow Athletic, Division One, 21 September 1907
- League defeat: 1–11 v Airdrieonians, Division One, 28 April 1951
- Fewest league defeats: 0 (unbeaten, 2023–24)
- Longest run of league matches without losing: 43 (18 April 2023 – 28 September 2024)
- Cup victory: 11–1 v Tillicoultry, Scottish Cup, 7 September 1889; and 10–0 (twice) v Breadalbane, Scottish Cup, 13 January 1923 and 23 January 1926
- Cup defeat: 1–9 v Motherwell, League Cup, 11 August 1962; 0–8 v Aberdeen, League Cup, 20 September 1972
- Record attendance: 23,100 v Celtic, Scottish Cup, Brockville Park, 21 February 1953
- Most international caps: 14, Alex Parker for Scotland (1955–58); Russell Latapy for Trinidad and Tobago (2003–09)
- Most league goals in one season: 43, Evelyn Morrison, (1928–29)
- Most goals in one season: 45, Evelyn Morrison, (1928–29)
- Most league goals: 129, Kenneth Dawson, (1934–35 to 1950–51)
- Most senior goals: 237, Kenneth Dawson, (1934–35 to 1950–51)
- Most top division goals: 115, Jock Simpson, (1905–06 to 1921–22)
- Most Scottish Cup goals: 12, Robert Keyes, (1934–35 to 1938–39)
- Most League Cup goals: 25, Angus Plumb, (1949–50 to 1954–55)
- Most league appearances: 451, Tom Ferguson, (1919–20 to 1931–32)
- Most senior appearances: 498, Tom Ferguson, (1919–20 to 1931–32)
- Most Scottish Cup appearances: 47, Tom Ferguson, (1919–20 to 1931–32)
- Most League Cup appearances: 68, John Markie, (1964–65 to 1975–76)
- World transfer record fee paid: £5,000 for Syd Puddefoot from West Ham United, (1922)

== European record ==
Since the Union of European Football Associations (UEFA) was formed in 1960, Falkirk has qualified for a UEFA club competition on one occasion. In 2009, Falkirk reached the final of the Scottish Cup, which it lost to Rangers. The winner of the Scottish Cup would normally qualify for the UEFA Europa League, but because Rangers had already qualified for the UEFA Champions League through their league ranking in the SPL, the place was passed to Falkirk as runners-up. Falkirk were eliminated in the second qualifying round by FC Vaduz of Liechtenstein in a two-legged tie. The club's only European goal was scored by Ryan Flynn in the 1–0 first leg home victory against Vaduz.

| Season | Competition | Round | Opponent | Home | Away | Aggregate |
|---|---|---|---|---|---|---|
| 2009–10 | UEFA Europa League | Second qualifying round | (Liechtenstein) FC Vaduz | 1–0 | 0–2 | 1–2 (a.e.t.) |

== See also ==
- McCrae's Battalion
