= 2020–21 Ayr United F.C. season =

Ayr United
2020–21 season
- Chairman: Lachlan Cameron (until 12 January 2021); David Smith
- Manager: Mark Kerr (until 28 February); David Hopkin (from 11 March)
- Stadium: Somerset Park
- Scottish Championship: 8th
- Scottish Cup: Third round
- Scottish League Cup: Second round
- Top goalscorer: League: Cammy Smith (6); All: Luke McCowan (9)
Home colours	Away colours

The 2020–21 season was Ayr United's 3rd consecutive season in the Scottish Championship after being promoted from league one in the 2017–18 season. Ayr also competed in the, League Cup and the Scottish Cup. On 2 October 2020, the SPFL confirmed that the Scottish Challenge Cup had been cancelled for the upcoming season.

== Summary ==
=== Season ===
Ayr began the season on 6 October in the League Cup group stages with the Scottish Championship season set to begin on 17th October. Club chairman Lachlan Cameron stepped down from his position in January 2021 after 13 years in the role with local businessman David Smith being appointed in his place.

== Results and fixtures ==
Win Draw Loss Postponed

=== Scottish Championship ===
17 October 2020 1	Ayr United	2–1	Queen of the South	Somerset Park, Ayr
15:00	Miller 13', 18'; McCowan (red card) 90+1'	Report	Dobbie 56' (pen.); Maxwell (red card) 66'	Attendance: 0 Referee: Steven McLean

24 October 2020 2	Inverness CT	1–1	Ayr United	Caledonian Stadium, Inverness
15:00	Todorov 86'	Report	Cameron 57'	Attendance: 0 Referee: Alan Muir

31 October 2020 3	Greenock Morton	3–2	Ayr United	Cappielow, Greenock
15:00	Oliver 83'; Blues 85'; Strapp 88'	Report	Strapp 32' (o.g.); Muirhead (red card) 52'; Smith 74'	Attendance: 0 Referee: Greg Aitken

7 November 2020 4	Ayr United	0–0	Dunfermline Athletic	Somerset Park, Ayr
15:00		Report		Attendance: 0 Referee: Craig Napier

21 November 2020 5	Ayr United	2–0	Dundee	Somerset Park, Ayr
15:00	Smith 3'; Moffat 16'	Report		Attendance: 0 Referee: Graham Beaton

5 December 2020 6	Alloa Athletic	0–2	Ayr United	Recreation Park, Alloa
15:00		Report	McCowan 38'; Murdoch 61'; Smith (red card) 84'	Attendance: 0 Referee: Barry Cook

11 December 2020 7	Ayr United	0–0	Raith Rovers	Somerset Park, Ayr
19:45		Report		Attendance: 0

19 December 2020 8	Arbroath	2–1	Ayr United	Gayfield Park, Arbroath
15:00	Craigen 36', 39'	Report	Baird 88'	Attendance: 0

26 December 2020 9	Heart of Midlothian	5–3	Ayr United	Tynecastle Park, Edinburgh
15:00	Kingsley 11'; Wighton 68', 74'; Lee 71'; Boyce 81'	Report	Smith 57'; McCowan 60'; Walsh 90+4'	Attendance: 0 Referee: David Munro

29 December 2020 10	Ayr United	1–1	Greenock Morton	Somerset Park, Ayr
18:00	McCowan 38'	Report	Nesbitt 26' (pen.)	Attendance: 0 Referee: Gavin Duncan

2 January 2021 11	Queen of the South	3–2	Ayr United	Palmerston Park, Dumfries
15:00	Obileye 29' (pen.); Shields 32', 90+1'	Report	Reading 7'; Buchanan 90' (o.g.)	Attendance: 0 Referee: Greg Aitken

23 January 2021 13	Dunfermline Athletic	0–0	Ayr United	East End Park, Dunfermline
15:00		Report		Attendance: 0 Referee: Don Robertson

30 January 2021 12	Ayr United	4–1	Alloa Athletic	Somerset Park, Ayr
15:00	Walsh 6'; McCowan 30', 69'; Muirhead 61' (pen.)	Report	Trouten 11'	Attendance: 0 Referee: Peter Stuart

5 February 2021 14	Ayr United	0–1	Heart of Midlothian	Somerset Park, Ayr
19:45		Report	Boyce 48' (pen.)	Attendance: 0 Referee: Steven McLean

20 February 2021 15	Inverness CT	2–0	Ayr United	Caledonian Stadium, Inverness
15:00	MacKay 31'; Todorov 54'	Report		Attendance: 0 Referee: Peter Stuart

27 February 2021 16	Ayr United	0–1	Arbroath	Somerset Park, Ayr
15:00		Report	McKenna 63'	Attendance: 0 Referee: Grant Irvine

6 March 2021 17	Greenock Morton	0–2	Ayr United	Cappielow, Greenock
15:00		Report	Smith 55', 87'	Attendance: 0 Referee: Mike Roncone

9 March 2021 18	Raith Rovers	0–0	Ayr United	Stark's Park, Kirkcaldy
19:45		Report		Attendance: 0 Referee: Scott Lambie

13 March 2021 19	Heart of Midlothian	2–0	Ayr United	Tynecastle Park, Edinburgh
15:00	Gnanduillet 72'; Walker 86'	Report		Attendance: 0 Referee: Colin Steven

16 March 2021 20	Dundee	1–3	Ayr United	Dens Park, Dundee
19:30	Sow 86'	Report	McKenzie 18', 84'; Smith 49'	Attendance: 0 Referee: Alan Newlands

20 March 2021 21	Ayr United	1–1	Raith Rovers	Somerset Park, Ayr
15:00	Muirhead 72'	Report	Benedictus 57'	Attendance: 0 Referee: David Dickinson

27 March 2021 22	Alloa Athletic	2–2	Ayr United	Recreation Park, Alloa
15:00	Cameron 31'; Williamson 46'	Report	Walsh 15'; Robertson 76' (o.g.)	Attendance: 0 Referee: Alan Muir

6 April 2021 23	Ayr United	0–3	Dundee	Somerset Park, Ayr
19:00		Report	Anderson 68'; Afolabi 74'; McGowan 87'	Attendance: 0 Referee: Steven McLean

10 April 2021 24	Ayr United	1–1	Dunfermline Athletic	Somerset Park, Ayr
15:00	Miller 24'	Report	McManus 12'	Attendance: 0 Referee: Greg Aitken

17 April 2021 25	Arbroath	4–0	Ayr United	Gayfield Park, Arbroath
15:00	Little 11'; Williamson 24'; Hamilton 27'; Hilson 65'	Report		Attendance: 0 Referee: Gavin Duncan

24 April 2021 26	Ayr United	0–0	Queen of the South	Somerset Park, Ayr
15:00		Report		Attendance: 0 Referee: Nick Walsh

30 April 2021 27	Inverness CT	2–2	Ayr United	Caledonian Stadium, Inverness
19:05	MacKay 6'; Welsh 47' (pen.)	Report	Muirhead 39' (pen.); Todd 67'	Attendance: 0 Referee: Craig Napier

=== Scottish League Cup ===
==== Group stage ====
Results

6 October 2020 1	Albion Rovers	2–5	Ayr United	Coatbridge
19:45	Aitken 23' (pen.), 38'; Wilson (red card) 78'	Report	McCowan 30'; Walsh 35'; Anderson 40', 82'; Zanatta 59'	Stadium: Cliftonhill; Attendance: 0

10 October 2020 2	Hamilton Academical	2–1	Ayr United	Hamilton
15:00	Ogkmpoe 19'; Trafford 36'	Report	Moffat 68'	Stadium: New Douglas Park; Attendance: 0 Referee: Colin Steven

13 October 2020 3	Ayr United	1–0	Annan Athletic	Ayr
19:45	Moffat 24' (pen.)	Report		Stadium: Somerset Park; Attendance: 0 Referee: Grant Irvine

14 November 2020 4	Ayr United	1–1 (6–5 p)	Stranraer	Ayr
15:00	McCowan 47'	Report	Duffy 2'	Stadium: Somerset Park; Attendance: 0 Referee: Barry Cook

==== Knockout round ====
28 November 2020 Second round	Livingston	4–0	Ayr United	Livingston
15:00	Chalmers 4' (o.g.); Fitzwater 6', 12'; Forrest 44'	Report		Stadium: Almondvale; Attendance: 0 Referee: David Munro

=== Scottish Cup ===
23 March 2021 Second round	Elgin City	0–4	Ayr United	Borough Briggs, Elgin
19:45		Report	Chalmers 5'; Moffat 18'; McCowan 25', 43'	Attendance: 0 Referee: Craig Napier

3 April 2021 Third round	Ayr United	0–1	Clyde	Somerset Park, Ayr
15:00		Report	Cuddihy 4'	Attendance: 0 Referee: David Munro

== Squad statistics ==
=== Appearances ===
As of 30 April 2021

No.	Pos	Nat	Player	Total		Championship		League Cup		Scottish Cup	
No.	Pos	Nat	Player	Apps	Goals	Apps	Goals	Apps	Goals	Apps	Goals
1	GK	(Scotland) SCO	P. J. Morrison	4	0	4+0	0	0+0	0	0+0	0
2	MF	(Scotland) SCO	Jordan Houston	23	0	17+2	0	2+1	0	1+0	0
3	DF	(Scotland) SCO	Patrick Reading	24	1	21+0	1	1+0	0	2+0	0
4	DF	(Scotland) SCO	Aaron Muirhead	29	4	24+0	3	3+1	1	1+0	0
5	DF	(England) ENG	Sam Roscoe	21	0	14+0	0	5+0	0	1+1	0
6	MF	(Scotland) SCO	Andy Murdoch	28	1	21+3	1	4+0	0	0+0	0
7	FW	(Scotland) SCO	Michael Moffat	32	4	16+9	1	5+0	2	2+0	1
8	MF	(Scotland) SCO	Michael Miller	27	4	16+5	4	4+0	0	2+0	0
9	FW	(England) ENG	Andre Wright	6	0	3+2	0	0+0	0	0+1	0
10	MF	(Scotland) SCO	Tom Walsh	21	4	10+8	3	1+0	1	2+0	0
11	MF	(Scotland) SCO	Luke McCowan	33	9	26+0	5	5+0	2	2+0	2
15	MF	(England) ENG	Josh Todd	5	1	3+1	1	0+0	0	0+1	0
17	DF	(Republic of Ireland) IRL	Corrie Ndaba	14	0	13+0	0	0+0	0	1+0	0
18	MF	(Scotland) SCO	Joe Chalmers	31	1	21+3	0	5+0	0	2+0	1
19	FW	(Canada) CAN	Dario Zanatta	18	1	3+10	0	3+2	1	0+0	0
20	DF	(Scotland) SCO	Michael Hewitt	8	0	0+4	0	2+2	0	0+0	0
21	GK	(New Zealand) NZL	Ellis Hare-Reid	0	0	0+0	0	0+0	0	0+0	0
22	FW	(Scotland) SCO	Mark McKenzie	27	2	6+14	2	2+3	0	1+1	0
23	MF	(England) ENG	Brett McGavin	1	0	0+1	0	0+0	0	0+0	0
24	MF	(Scotland) SCO	Liam Miller	0	0	0+0	0	0+0	0	0+0	0
28	MF	(Scotland) SCO	Jamie Barjonas	6	0	2+2	0	0+0	0	0+2	0
29	GK	(Slovakia) SVK	Peter Urminský	1	0	1+0	0	0+0	0	0+0	0
30	DF	(Scotland) SCO	Jack Baird	34	1	27+0	1	5+0	0	2+0	0
31	FW	(Scotland) SCO	Paul Smith	3	0	0+0	0	0+3	0	0+0	0
33	DF	(Scotland) SCO	Ross Love	0	0	0+0	0	0+0	0	0+0	0
Players who left the club during the 2020–21 season
1	GK	(Finland) FIN	Viljami Sinisalo	29	0	22+0	0	5+0	0	2+0	0
9	FW	(Scotland) SCO	Bruce Anderson	12	2	7+2	0	2+1	2	0+0	0
14	MF	(Scotland) SCO	Cammy Smith	21	6	19+1	6	0+0	0	1+0	0
15	FW	(Scotland) SCO	Innes Cameron	6	1	0+5	1	1+0	0	0+0	0
21	DF	(Scotland) SCO	Finn Ecrepont	0	0	0+0	0	0+0	0	0+0	0
27	MF	(Scotland) SCO	Mark Kerr	2	0	1+0	0	0+1	0	0+0	0

== Team statistics ==
=== League table ===
Pos	Team	Pld	W	D	L	GF	GA	GD	Pts	Promotion, qualification or relegation
6	Queen of the South	27	9	5	13	38	51	−13	32	
7	Arbroath	27	7	9	11	28	34	−6	30	
8	Ayr United	27	6	11	10	31	37	−6	29	
9	Greenock Morton (O)	27	6	11	10	22	33	−11	29	Qualification for the Championship play-offs
10	Alloa Athletic (R)	27	5	7	15	30	60	−30	22	Relegation to League One

Source: SPFL
Rules for classification: 1) Points; 2) Goal difference; 3) Goals scored; 4) Head-to-to head points; 5) Head-to-head goal difference; 6) Play-off (only for deciding promotion, play-off participation and relegation).
(O) Play-off winners; (R) Relegated

=== League Cup table ===
Pos	Team	Pld	W	PW	PL	L	GF	GA	GD	Pts	Qualification	AYR	ANN	STR	HAM	ALB
1	Ayr United	4	2	1	0	1	8	5	+3	8	Qualification for the Second round	—	1–0	p1–1	—	—
2	Annan Athletic	4	2	0	1	1	9	4	+5	7		—	—	1–1p	3–1	—
3	Stranraer	4	1	1	2	0	6	5	+1	7		—	—	—	2–1	2–2p
4	Hamilton Academical	4	2	0	0	2	7	6	+1	6		2–1	—	—	—	3–0
5	Albion Rovers	4	0	1	0	3	5	15	−10	2		2–5	1–5	—	—	—

Rules for classification: 1) points, 2) goal difference, 3) goals scored, 4) away goals scored, 5) matches won, 6) away matches won, 7) drawing of lots.

== Transfers ==
=== Transfers in ===
Date	Position	Name	From	Fee	Ref.
21 July 2020	DF	Patrick Reading	(England) Stevenage	Free transfer	
21 July 2020	MF	(Canada) Dario Zanatta	Partick Thistle	Free transfer	
6 August 2020	DF	Michael Miller	Raith Rovers	Free transfer	
6 August 2020	MF	Tom Walsh	Inverness CT	Free transfer	
4 September 2020	DF	Jack Baird	St Mirren	Free transfer	
15 September 2020	DF	Joe Chalmers	Ross County	Free transfer	
20 January 2021	FW	Cammy Smith	Dundee United	Free transfer	
25 January 2021	FW	(England) Andre Wright	(Republic of Ireland) Bohemian	Free transfer	

=== Transfers out ===
Date	Position	Name	To	Fee	Ref.
1 June 2020	MF	Ross Docherty	Partick Thistle	Free transfer	
1 June 2020	MF	Alan Forrest	Livingston	Free transfer	
27 July 2020	DF	Daniel Harvie	(England) MK Dons	Undisclosed	
11 August 2020	MF	Grant Gillespie	Queen's Park	Free transfer	
19 August 2020	MF	Andy Geggan	BSC Glasgow	Free transfer	
5 October 2020	DF	Steven Bell	East Kilbride	Free transfer	
1 April 2021	FW	Cammy Smith	(United States) Indy Eleven	Free transfer	

=== Loans in ===
Date	Position	Name	From	End date	Ref.
26 September 2020	GK	(Finland) Viljami Sinisalo	(England) Aston Villa	8 April 2021	
5 October 2020	FW	Bruce Anderson	Aberdeen	4 January 2021	
22 October 2020	FW	Cammy Smith	Dundee United	20 January 2021	
23 October 2020	FW	Innes Cameron	Kilmarnock	15 January 2021	
7 January 2021	DF	(Republic of Ireland) Corrie Ndaba	(England) Ipswich Town	31 May 2021	
1 February 2021	MF	(England) Brett McGavin	(England) Ipswich Town	31 May 2021	
27 February 2021	GK	(Slovakia) Peter Urminský	St Mirren	31 May 2021	
18 March 2021	MF	Jamie Barjonas	Rangers	31 May 2021	
9 April 2021	GK	P. J. Morrison	Motherwell	31 May 2021	

=== Loans out ===
Start date	Position	Name	To	End date	Ref.
31 August 2020	MF	Finn Ecrepont	Albion Rovers	31 May 2021	
31 August 2020	FW	Gabe Skeoch	Albion Rovers	31 May 2021	
