= 2019–20 Ayr United F.C. season =

Ayr United
2019–20 season
- Chairman: Lachlan Cameron
- Manager: Ian McCall (Until 23 September); Mark Kerr (from 22 October)
- Stadium: Somerset Park
- Scottish Championship: 4th
- Scottish Cup: Fifth round
- Scottish League Cup: Group stage
- Scottish Challenge Cup: Third round
- Top goalscorer: League: Alan Forrest (10); All: Alan Forrest (10)
- Highest home attendance: 3,167 v Dundee United, Championship, 14 September 2019
- Lowest home attendance: 777 v Arbroath, Championship, 10 December 2019
- Average home league attendance: 1,778
Home colours	Away colours

The 2019–20 season was Ayr United's 2nd season in the Scottish Championship after being promoted from league one in the 2017–18 season. Ayr also competed in the Challenge Cup, League Cup and the Scottish Cup. On 13 March 2020 all SPFL leagues were indefinitely suspended due to the coronavirus pandemic.

== Summary ==
=== Season ===
Ayr began the season on 3 August 2019 and was scheduled to end on 2 May 2020. On 8 April 2020, the SPFL proposed to end the 2019–20 season by utilising a points per game ratio to determine the final standings. The plan was approved on 15 April 2020, declaring that the season was over, with Dundee United being named as title winners and relegating Partick Thistle to League One.

== Results and fixtures ==
Win Draw Loss Postponed

=== Scottish Championship ===
3 August 2019 Match 1	Ayr United	4–2	Greenock Morton	Somerset Park, Ayr
15:00	Moffat 9'; McCowan 55'; Forrest 64'; McGuffie 90+2'	Report	Tumilty 73'; Cadden 79'	Attendance: 1,935; Referee: Gavin Duncan

10 August 2019 Match 2	Dundee	1–0	Ayr United	Dens Park, Dundee
15:00	Nelson 74'	Report		Attendance: 5,520; Referee: Alan Newlands

24 August 2019 Match 3	Ayr United	1–0	Queen of the South	Somerset Park, Ayr
15:00	Kelly 26'	Report		Attendance: 2,005; Referee: Steven Kirkland

31 August 2019 Match 4	Partick Thistle	2–3	Ayr United	Firhill Stadium, Glasgow
15:00	Bannigan 14' (pen.) (red card) 65'; Gordon 43' (red card) 44'	Report	McCowan 24'; Doolan 72'; Kelly 78'	Attendance: 3,060; Referee: Andrew Dallas

14 September 2019 Match 5	Ayr United	2–0	Dundee United	Somerset Park, Ayr
15:00	Harvie 9'; Forrest 75' (pen.)	Report		Attendance: 3,167; Referee: Bobby Madden

21 September 2019 Match 6	Alloa Athletic	1–4	Ayr United	Recreation Park, Alloa
15:00	O'Hara 61'	Report	Forrest 10' (pen.); Roscoe 13'; McCowan 20'	Attendance: 902; Referee: David Lowe

28 September 2019 Match 7	Arbroath	0–3	Ayr United	Gayfield Park, Arbroath
15:00		Report	Forrest 12', 20'; Kelly 27'	Attendance: 1,105; Referee: Grant Irvine

5 October 2019 Match 8	Ayr United	0–2	Inverness Caledonian Thistle	Somerset Park, Ayr
15:00		Report	Vincent 31'; Rooney 64'	Attendance: 1,912; Referee: Steven McLean

19 October 2019 Match 9	Dunfermline Athletic	3–2	Ayr United	East End Park, Dunfermline
15:00	Kiltie 28'; Ashcroft 63'; Ryan 84'	Report	Ashcroft 43' (o.g.); Forrst 57'	Attendance: 3,905; Referee: Alan Muir

25 October 2019 Match 10	Ayr United	1–2	Dundee	Somerset Park, Ayr
19:05	McCowan 38'	Report	McDaid 16'; McGowan 32'	Attendance: 1,627; Referee: Bobby Madden

29 October 2019 Match 11	Greenock Morton	2–3	Ayr United	Cappielow, Greenock
19:45	Baird 47'; McHugh 61'	Report	Moore 50'; McCowan 55'; McGuffie 78'	Attendance: 1,431; Referee: Colin Steven

2 November 2019 Match 12	Ayr United	4–1	Partick Thistle	Somerset Park, Ayr
15:00	Moore 11', 48'; Moffat 18'; Forrest 52'	Report	Cardle 79'	Attendance: 2,558; Referee: William Collum

9 November 2019 Match 13	Queen of the South	3–1	Ayr United	Palmerston Park, Dumfries
15:00	Holt 18'; Murray 67'; Oliver 74'	Report	Moffat 38'; McCowan (red card) 78'	Attendance: 1,850; Referee: Don Robertson

3 December 2019 Match 14	Ayr United	0–1	Dunfermline Athletic	Somerset Park, Ayr
19:45		Report	Nisbet 68'	Attendance: 1,361; Referee: Euan Anderson

7 December 2019 Match 15	Inverness Caledonian Thistle	2–0	Ayr United	Caledonian Stadium, Inverness
15:00	White 20'; Storey 63'	Report		Attendance: 1,833; Referee: Gavin Ross

10 December 2019 Match 16	Ayr United	1–1	Arbroath	Somerset Park, Ayr
19:45	Kelly 22'	Report	McKenna 48 pen.'	Attendance: 777; Referee: Colin Steven

14 December 2019 Match 17	Ayr United	2–1	Alloa Athletic	Somerset Park, Ayr
15:00	Docherty 6' (12)	Report	O'Hara 67'	Attendance: 1,117; Referee: David Munro

21 December 2019 Match 18	Dundee United	4–0	Ayr United	Tannadice Park, Dundee
15:00	Stanton 42'; Shankland 57 pen.' Clark 61'; Harkes 87'	Report	Kerr (red card) 56'	Attendance: 7,744; Referee: Greg Aitken

28 December 2019 Match 19	Ayr United	1–2	Queen of the South	Somerset Park, Ayr
15:00	Muirhead 77' (pen.)	Report	Semple 4'; Dobbie 58 pen.'	Attendance: 2,062; Referee: David Lowe

4 January 2020 Match 20	Dunfermline Athletic	0–1	Ayr United	East End Park, Dunfermline
15:00		Report	Moore 38'	Attendance: 3,915; Referee: Mike Roncone

25 January 2020 Match 21	Ayr United	1–0	Inverness Caledonian Thistle	Somerset Park, Ayr
15:00	Kelly 61'	Report		Attendance: 1,602; Referee: Greg Aitken

31 January 2020 Match 22	Partick Thistle	1–1	Ayr United	Firhill Stadium, Glasgow
19:05	Graham 33'	Report	Forrest 52' (pen.)	Attendance: 2,416; Referee: Greg Aitken

25 February 2020 Match 23	Ayr United	1–2	Greenock Morton	Somerset Park, Ayr
19:45	Malley 22'	Report	Orsi 29'; Cadden 72'	Attendance: 1,336; Referee: David Lowe

29 February 2020 Match 24	Alloa Athletic	0–2	Ayr United	Recreation Park, Alloa
15:00		Report	Drinan 9'; Forrest 82'	Attendance: 915; Referee: Greg Aitken

3 March 2020 Match 25	Ayr United	0–0	Dundee United	Somerset Park, Ayr
19:45		Report		Attendance: 1,674; Referee: David Munro

7 March 2020 Match 26	Ayr United	0–0	Dundee	Somerset Park, Ayr
15:00		Report		Attendance: 1,758; Referee: Steven McLean

10 March 2020 Match 27	Dundee	2–0	Ayr United	Dens Park, Dundee
19:45	Hemmings 11'; Crankshaw 90+2'	Report		Attendance: 4,670; Referee: John Beaton

=== Scottish League Cup ===
13 July 2019 Match 1	Berwick Rangers	0–7	Ayr United	Berwick-upon-Tweed
15:00		Report	Moffat 21', 36'; McCowan 26', 70'; Doolan 35', 86'; McGuffie 42'	Stadium: Shielfield Park; Attendance: 603; Referee: Scott Lambie

16 July 2019 Match 2	Livingston	2–1	Ayr United	Livingston
19:45	Souda 25'; Lamie 83'	Report	Murdoch 51'	Stadium: Almondvale; Attendance: 1,097; Referee: William Collum

20 July 2019 Match 3	Ayr United	2–1	Falkirk	Ayr
15:00	McCowan 26'; Geggan 75'	Report	McManus 42'; Durnan (red card) 47'	Stadium: Somerset Park; Attendance: 1,605; Referee: Barry Cook

22 July 2019 Match 4	Ayr United	2–2 (5–6 p)	Stranraer	Ayr
15:00	Moffat 2'; Kelly 44'	Report	Cummins 42', 86'	Stadium: Somerset Park; Attendance: 1,430; Referee: Grant Irvine

=== Scottish Challenge Cup ===
7 September 2019 Third round	(Wales) Wrexham	1–1 (6–5 p)	Ayr United	Wrexham
19:45	Bickerstaff 70'	Report	Roscoe 85'	Stadium: Racecourse Ground; Attendance: 1,697; Referee: Steven Gregg

=== Scottish Cup ===
18 January 2020 Fourth round	Ayr United	1–0	Ross County	Ayr
15:00	Bell 37'	Report		Stadium: Somerset Park; Attendance: 1,538; Referee: Andrew Dallas

8 February 2020 Fifth round	Ayr United	1–2	St Johnstone	Ayr
15:00	Drinan 4'; Muirhead (red card) 26'	Report	Muirhead 18 o.g.' Hendry 27'	Stadium: Somerset Park; Attendance: 2,625; Referee: Steven McLean

== Squad statistics ==
=== Appearances ===
As of 10 March 2020

No.	Pos	Nat	Player	Total		Championship		League Cup		Challenge Cup		Scottish Cup	
No.	Pos	Nat	Player	Apps	Goals	Apps	Goals	Apps	Goals	Apps	Goals	Apps	Goals
1	GK	(Scotland) SCO	Ross Doohan	33	0	27+0	0	4+0	0	0+0	0	2+0	0
2	DF	(Scotland) SCO	Aaron Muirhead	29	2	21+2	1	3+0	1	1+0	0	2+0	0
3	DF	(Scotland) SCO	Daniel Harvie	33	1	27+0	1	4+0	0	0+0	0	2+0	0
4	MF	(Scotland) SCO	Mark Kerr	22	0	12+4	0	2+1	0	1+0	0	2+0	0
5	DF	(England) ENG	Sam Roscoe	26	2	18+2	1	3+0	0	1+0	1	0+2	0
6	MF	(Scotland) SCO	Andy Geggan	20	1	14+3	0	2+0	1	1+0	0	0+0	0
7	FW	(Scotland) SCO	Michael Moffat	34	6	21+6	3	4+0	3	1+0	0	1+1	0
8	MF	(England) ENG	Connor Malley	5	1	4+1	1	0+0	0	0+0	0	0+0	0
9	FW	(Scotland) SCO	Craig Moore	11	4	10+1	4	0+0	0	0+0	0	0+0	0
10	MF	(Scotland) SCO	Alan Forrest	32	10	25+0	10	1+3	0	1+0	0	2+0	0
11	MF	(Scotland) SCO	Luke McCowan	31	8	19+5	5	4+0	3	1+0	0	1+1	0
12	FW	(Scotland) SCO	Scott Tiffoney	7	0	1+5	0	0+0	0	0+0	0	0+1	0
15	DF	(Scotland) SCO	Steven Bell	22	1	16+0	0	3+0	0	1+0	0	2+0	1
16	FW	(Republic of Ireland) IRL	Aaron Drinan	9	2	7+0	1	0+0	0	0+0	0	2+0	1
18	MF	(Scotland) SCO	Andy Murdoch	8	0	4+0	0	3+1	0	0+0	0	0+0	0
19	GK	(New Zealand) NZL	Ellis Hare-Reid	1	0	0+0	0	0+0	0	1+0	0	0+0	0
21	DF	(Scotland) SCO	Finn Ecrepont	1	0	0+0	0	0+0	0	0+1	0	0+0	0
22	FW	(Scotland) SCO	Mark McKenzie	11	1	0+10	1	0+0	0	0+1	0	0+0	0
23	MF	(Scotland) SCO	Ross Docherty	26	2	21+1	2	2+0	0	1+0	0	1+0	0
24	DF	(Scotland) SCO	Leon Murphy	0	0	0+0	0	0+0	0	0+0	0	0+0	0
27	FW	(Scotland) SCO	Paul Smith	0	0	0+0	0	0+0	0	0+0	0	0+0	0
28	MF	(Scotland) SCO	Grant Gillespie	5	0	1+3	0	0+0	0	0+0	0	1+0	0
30	MF	(Scotland) SCO	Stephen Kelly	33	6	27+0	5	4+0	1	0+0	0	2+0	0
31	MF	(Scotland) SCO	Jordan Houston	25	5	18+5	5	0+0	0	0+0	0	2+0	0
Players who left the club during the 2019–20 season
8	FW	(Scotland) SCO	Kris Doolan	17	3	1+10	1	3+1	2	1+0	0	0+1	0
12	MF	(Scotland) SCO	Craig McGuffie	15	3	0+12	2	1+2	1	0+0	0	0+0	0
14	DF	(Scotland) SCO	David Ferguson	3	0	0+0	0	2+1	0	0+0	0	0+0	0
16	MF	(Scotland) SCO	Jamie Adams	4	0	3+1	0	0+0	0	0+0	0	0+0	0
17	MF	(Scotland) SCO	Frank Ross	2	0	0+0	0	0+2	0	0+0	0	0+0	0

== Team statistics ==
=== League table ===
Pos	Team	Pld	W	D	L	GF	GA	GD	Pts	PPG	Promotion, qualification or relegation (Note: All play-off matches were cancelled, as clubs voted to curtail the season due to the COVID-19 pandemic in Scotland.)
2	Inverness Caledonian Thistle	27	14	3	10	39	32	+7	45	1.67	
3	Dundee	27	11	8	8	32	31	+1	41	1.52	
4	Ayr United	27	12	4	11	38	35	+3	40	1.48	
5	Arbroath	26	10	6	10	24	26	−2	36	1.38	
6	Dunfermline Athletic	28	10	7	11	41	36	+5	37	1.32	

Source: SPFL
Rules for classification: 1) Points per game.

=== League Cup table ===
Pos	Team	Pld	W	PW	PL	L	GF	GA	GD	Pts	Qualification	LIV	AYR	FAL	STR	BER
1	Livingston	4	3	1	0	0	10	3	+7	11	Qualification for the Second Round	—	2–1	—	—	5–0
2	Ayr United	4	2	0	1	1	12	5	+7	7		—	—	2–1	2–2p	—
3	Falkirk	4	2	0	1	1	6	3	+3	7		1–1p	—	—	1–0	—
4	Stranraer	4	1	1	0	2	9	5	+4	5		1–2	—	—	—	6–0
5	Berwick Rangers	4	0	0	0	4	0	21	−21	0		—	0–7	0–3	—	—

Rules for classification: 1) goal difference, 2) goals scored, 3) away goals scored, 4) matches won, 5) away matches won, 6) drawing of lots.

== Transfers ==
=== Transfers in ===
Date	Position	Name	From	Fee	Ref.
13 June 2019	DF	Sam Roscoe	Aberdeen	Free transfer	
24 June 2019	FW	Kris Doolan	Partick Thistle	Free transfer	
23 January 2020	DF	Jordan Houston	Rangers	Free transfer	
24 January 2020	MF	Grant Gillespie	(Republic of Ireland) Derry City	Free transfer	

=== Transfers out ===
Date	Position	Name	To	Fee	Ref.
1 July 2019	DF	Chris Higgins	East Fife	Free transfer	
1 July 2019	MF	Robbie Crawford	Livingston	Free transfer	
1 July 2019	DF	Liam Smith	Dundee United	Free transfer	
1 July 2019	DF	Michael Rose	(England) Coventry City	Free transfer	
1 July 2019	FW	James Hilton	Stranraer	Free transfer	
1 July 2019	MF	Stuart Faulds	Largs Thistle	Free transfer	
1 July 2019	MF	Declan McDaid	Dundee	Free transfer	
3 July 2019	FW	Lawrence Shankland	Dundee United	Free transfer	
31 August 2019	DF	David Ferguson	Peterhead	Free transfer	
11 January 2020	MF	Jamie Adams	Retired		
30 January 2020	MF	Craig McGuffie	Greenock Morton	Free transfer	
6 February 2020	FW	Kris Doolan	Greenock Morton	Free transfer	

=== Loans in ===
Date	Position	Name	From	End date	Ref.
8 July 2019	MF	Frank Ross	Aberdeen	1 January 2020	
10 July 2019	MF	Stephen Kelly	Rangers	31 May 2020	
12 July 2019	GK	Ross Doohan	Celtic	31 May 2020	
30 August 2019	DF	Jordan Houston	Rangers	31 May 2020	
17 January 2020	FW	(Republic of Ireland) Aaron Drinan	(England) Ipswich Town	31 May 2020	
30 January 2020	FW	Scott Tiffoney	Livingston	31 May 2020	
31 January 2020	MF	(England) Connor Malley	(England) Middlesbrough	31 May 2020	

=== Loans out ===
Start date	Position	Name	To	End date	Ref.
1 July 2019	MF	Leon Murphy	Stranraer	31 May 2020	
4 August 2019	DF	Michael Hewitt	Kilwinning Rangers	31 May 2020	
1 September 2019	DF	Nathan Baird	Cumnock Juniors	31 May 2020	
