= 2019–20 Greenock Morton F.C. season =

Greenock Morton
2019–20 season
- Chairman: Crawford Rae
- Manager: David Hopkin
- Stadium: Cappielow Park
- Scottish Championship: 7th
- Scottish Cup: Fourth Round
- Scottish League Cup: Second round
- Scottish Challenge Cup: Third round
Home colours	Away colours	Third colours

During the 2019–20 season, Greenock Morton are competing in the Scottish Championship the second tier of Scottish football, having finished 5th in the 2018–19 season. Morton will also compete in the Challenge Cup, Scottish League Cup and the Scottish Cup.

== Results and fixtures ==
Win Draw Loss Postponed

=== Scottish Championship ===
3 August 2019 1	Ayr United	4–2	Greenock Morton	Ayr
15:00	Moffat 9'; McCowan 55'; Forrest 64'; McGuffie 90+2'	Report	Tumilty 73'; Cadden 79'	Stadium: Somerset Park; Attendance: 1,935; Referee: Gavin Duncan

10 August 2019 2	Greenock Morton	4–1	Alloa Athletic	Greenock
15:00	McHugh 5', 61', 74'; Lyon 53'	Report	Cawley 22'; Graham (red card) 62'	Stadium: Cappielow; Attendance: 1,646; Referee: Gavin Ross

23 August 2019 3	Greenock Morton	3–2	Partick Thistle	Greenock
15:00	Cadden 72'; Sutton 77'; McLean 80'	Report	Miller 25'; De Vita 28'	Stadium: Cappielow; Attendance: 2,197; Referee: Bobby Madden

3 August 2019 4	Inverness CT	5–0	Greenock Morton	Inverness
15:00	Keatings 43', 46'; White 67'; Donaldson 77'; Todorov 80'	Report		Stadium: Caledonian Stadium; Attendance: 2,136; Referee: Alan Newlands

3 August 2019 5	Queen of the South	1–0	Greenock Morton	Dumfries
15:00	El Bakhtaoui 16'	Report		Stadium: Palmerston Park; Attendance: 1,302; Referee: John Beaton

21 September 2019 6	Greenock Morton	1–0	Dundee	Greenock
15:00	Grant 45+1'	Report	Robertson (yellow card) 45'; McGowan (yellow card) 78'; Nelson (yellow card) 86'	Stadium: Cappielow Park; Attendance: 1,901; Referee: (Scotland) John McKendrick

28 September 2019 7	Dundee United	6–0	Greenock Morton	Dundee
15:00	Shankland 1', 5', 56'; Watson (yellow card) 40'; McMullan 41', 80'; Chalmers 84'	Report	Strapp (yellow card) 65'	Stadium: Tannadice Park; Attendance: 7,404; Referee: (Scotland) Alan Muir (referee)

5 October 2019 8	Greenock Morton	1–1	Dunfermline Athletic	Greenock
15:00	Grant (yellow card) 55'; Blues (yellow card) 64'; McAlister 90+4'; Welsh (yellow card) 90+5'	Report	Cochrane (yellow card) 24'; Ryan 87'	Stadium: Cappielow Park; Attendance: 1,690; Referee: (Scotland) Graham Beaton

19 October 2019 9	Arbroath	1–0	Greenock Morton	Arbroath
15:00	O'Brien (yellow card) 13'; Linn 74'	Report	Blues (yellow card) 72'	Stadium: Gayfield Park; Attendance: 1,009; Referee: (Scotland) Willie Collum

26 October 2019 10	Greenock Morton	2–1	Inverness Caledonian Thistle	Greenock
15:00	McHugh 6', 81'	Report	Curry 20'; Todorov (yellow card) 86'; Carson (yellow card) 90+4'	Stadium: Cappielow Park; Attendance: 1,408; Referee: (Scotland) Euan Anderson

29 October 2019 11	Greenock Morton	2–3	Ayr United	Greenock
19:45	Salkeld (yellow card) 40'; Baird 47'; McHugh 61'	Report	Moore 50'; Docherty (yellow card) 53'; McCowan 55'; McGuffie 78'	Stadium: Cappielow Park; Attendance: 1,431; Referee: (Scotland) Colin Steven

1 November 2019 12	Dundee	2–1	Greenock Morton	Dundee
19:05	Hemmings 63'; Ness 80'	Report	Muirhead (yellow card) 50'; Salkeld 64'	Stadium: Kilmac Stadium at Dens Park; Attendance: 4,228; Referee: (Scotland) Greg Aitken

9 November 2019 13	Partick Thistle	2–1	Greenock Morton	Glasgow
15:00	Hall (yellow card) 35'; Bannigan (red card) 53'; Gordon 59', 66'	Report	Baird 61'	Stadium: The Energy Check Stadium; Attendance: 2,751; Referee: (Scotland) Bobby Madden

16 November 2019 14	Greenock Morton	1–0	Arbroath	Greenock
15:00	Lyon 3'	Report	Murphy (yellow card) 41'; Hamilton (yellow card) 71'; Stirling (yellow card) 86'; Doris (yellow card) 89'	Stadium: Cappielow Park; Attendance: 1,185; Referee: (Scotland) Alan Newlands

7 December 2019 15	Dnfermline Athletic	3–1	Greenock Morton	Dunfermline
15:00	Edwards (yellow card) 19'; Nisbet 21' (pen.), 84'; Kiltie 52'	Report	Rogers (yellow card) 20'; Baird (yellow card) 45'; Lyon 62'; Welsh (yellow card) 65'; Grant (yellow card) 74'; Nesbitt (yellow card) 86'	Stadium: East End Park; Attendance: 3,515; Referee: (Scotland) Barry Cook

10 December 2019 16	Greenock Morton	1–2	Dundee United	Greenock
19:45	Smith 25' (o.g.); Jacobs (yellow card) 39'; McAlister (yellow card) 57'; Coalville (yellow card) 90+4'	Report	Appéré 5'; Shankland 31'	Stadium: Cappielow Park; Attendance: 1,120; Referee: (Scotland) David Lowe

21 December 2019 17	Alloa Athletic	0–2	Greenock Morton	Alloa
15:00		Report	McAlister (yellow card) 12'; Nesbitt (yellow card) 55'; Cadden 64'; Baird 67'	Stadium: The Indodrill Stadium; Attendance: 727; Referee: (Scotland) Kevin Clancy

28 December 2019 18	Greenock Morton	1–2	Partick Thistle	Greenock
15:00	Jacobs 30' (pen.)	Report	Jones 5'; Cole (yellow card) 29'; Cardle (yellow card) 30'; O'Ware 61'; Fox (yellow card) 90+2'	Stadium: Cappielow Park; Attendance: 2,742; Referee: (Scotland) Craig Napier

4 January 2020 19	Arbroath	1–2	Greenock Morton	Arbroath
15:00	Stewart 23'; O'Brien (yellow card) 65'	Report	Sutton 12'; Coalville 20'; Jacobs (yellow card) 61'	Stadium: Gayfield Park; Attendance: 1,273; Referee: (Scotland) Gavin Duncan

11 January 2020 20	Greenock Morton	3–2	Dunfermline Athletic	Greenock
15:00	Millar (yellow card) 22'; Jacobs 42', 84'; McAlister 49'; Muirhead (yellow card) 77'	Report	Murray 23'; McGill (yellow card) 59'; Martin (yellow card) 81'; Turner (yellow card) 90+1'; Nisbet 90+3'	Stadium: Cappielow Park; Attendance: 1,470; Referee: (Scotland) Barry Cook

25 January 2020 21	Dundee United	1–1	Greenock Morton	Dundee
15:00	Appéré (yellow card) 42'; Shankland 90'	Report	Orsi 17'; Coalville (yellow card) 82'; Rogers (yellow card) 86'	Stadium: Tannadice Park; Attendance: 7,644; Referee: (Scotland) Andrew Dallas

1 February 2020 22	Greenock Morton	1–1	Dundee	Greenock
15:00	Jacobs (yellow card) 8' (yellow-red card) 58'; McAlister 26'	Report	Hemmings 12'; Callachan (yellow card) 20'; Dorrans (yellow card) 52'; Berra (yellow card) 75'	Stadium: Cappielow Park; Attendance: 1,643; Referee: (Scotland) Bobby Madden

8 February 2020 23	Greenock Morton	2–2	Queen of the South	Greenock
15:00	McHugh 59' (pen.); Nesbitt 76'	Report	Petravičius 18'; Devine (yellow card) 66'; Hamilton 73'; Stewart (yellow card) 77'	Stadium: Cappielow Park; Attendance: 1,380; Referee: (Scotland) Willie Collum

22 February 2020 24	Greenock Morton	4–4	Alloa Athletic	Greenock
15:00	Jacobs 15'; Coalville (yellow card) 36' (goal) 40'; Tumilty 44'; McHugh 45+1' (yellow card) 56'	Report	Trouten 20'; Cawley 22'; O'Hara 85'; Deas 90+2'	Stadium: Cappielow Park; Attendance: 1,214; Referee: (Scotland) Graham Beaton

25 February 2020 25	Ayr United	1–2	Greenock Morton	Ayr
19:45	Malley 22'; Harvie (yellow card) 68'	Report	Orsi 29'; Strapp (yellow card) 64'; Cadden 72'; Coalville (yellow card) 84'	Stadium: Somerset Park; Attendance: 1,336; Referee: (Scotland) David Lowe

29 February 2020 26	Queen of the South	0–4	Greenock Morton	Dumfries
15:00	Wilson (yellow card) 45+2'	Report	Tumilty 25'; Nesbitt 44'; Cadden 77'; McGuffie 88'	Stadium: Palmerston Park; Attendance: 1,116; Referee: (Scotland) Euan Anderson

3 March 2020 27	Inverness Caledonian Thistle	3–2	Greenock Morton	Inverness
19:45	White 18'; Trafford (yellow card) 64'; Rooney 67'; Todorov 90+2'	Report	Nesbitt 61'; Tumilty (yellow card) 74'; Lyon 76'; Strapp (yellow card) 90'	Stadium: Caledonian Stadium; Attendance: 1,772; Referee: (Scotland) Craig Napier

7 March 2020 28	Greenock Morton	1–1	Arbroath	Greenock
15:00	Cadden (yellow card) 34'; McAlister (yellow card) 90'; McGinty 90+3'	Report	Wighton 49'; Stewart (yellow card) 79'; Hilson (yellow card) 85'	Stadium: Cappielow Park; Attendance: 1,472; Referee: (Scotland) Steven Reid

14 March 2020 29	Greenock Morton	P – P	Dundee United	Greenock
15:00				Stadium: Cappielow Park

21 March 2020 30	Dunfermline Athletic	P – P	Greenock Morton	Dunfermline
15:00				Stadium: East End Park

28 March 2020 31	Partick Thistle	P – P	Greenock Morton	Glasgow
15:00				Stadium: Firhill Stadium

4 April 2020 32	Greenock Morton	P – P	Inverness Caledonian Thistle	Greenock
15:00				Stadium: Cappielow Park

11 April 2020 33	Dundee	P – P	Greenock Morton	Dundee
15:00				Stadium: Kilmac Stadium at Dens Park

17 April 2020 34	Greenock Morton	P – P	Ayr United	Greenock
19:05				Stadium: Cappielow Park

25 April 2020 35	Alloa Athletic	P – P	Greenock Morton	Alloa
15:00				Stadium: Recreation Park

2 May 2020 36	Greenock Morton	P – P	Queen of the South	Greenock
15:00				Stadium: Cappielow Park

=== Scottish League Cup ===
16 July 2019 Group Stage	Greenock Morton	6–1	Dumbarton	Greenock
15:00	Neill 15' (o.g.); Grant 17'; Jacobs 23'; Strapp 31'; Sutton 45'; McHugh 69'	Report	Neill 63'	Stadium: Cappielow; Attendance: 1,228; Referee: Grant Irvine

19 July 2019 Group Stage	Motherwell	4–0	Greenock Morton	Motherwell
19:45	Scott 22', 66'; Hylton 76'; Donnelly 82'	Report		Stadium: Fir Park; Attendance: 3,167; Referee: Willie Collum

23 July 2019 Group Stage	Annan Athletic	0–5	Greenock Morton	Annan
19:45	Nesbitt 7', 83'; Cadden 33', 43'; Muirhead 90'	Report		Stadium: Galabank; Attendance: 478; Referee: Steven Reid

27 July 2019 Group Stage	Greenock Morton	3–3 (4–3 p)	Queen of the South	Greenock
15:00	Sutton 31'; Cadden 45' (pen.); McHugh 56'	Report	Kilday 4'; McAlister 62' (o.g.); Semple 78'	Stadium: Cappielow; Attendance: 1,388; Referee: Steven Kirkland

==== Group E Table ====
Pos	Team	Pld	W	PW	PL	L	GF	GA	GD	Pts	Qualification	MOT	GMO	QOS	DUM	ANN
1	Motherwell	4	4	0	0	0	13	0	+13	12	Qualification for the Second Round	—	4–0	—	—	4–0
2	Greenock Morton	4	2	1	0	1	14	8	+6	8	Qualification for the Second Round	—	—	p3–3	6–1	—
3	Queen of the South	4	1	1	1	1	10	10	0	6		0–3	—	—	—	p3–3
4	Dumbarton	4	1	0	0	3	3	12	−9	3		0–2	—	1–4	—	—
5	Annan Athletic	4	0	0	1	3	3	13	−10	1		—	0–5	—	0–1	—

Rules for classification: 1) goal difference, 2) goals scored, 3) away goals scored, 4) matches won, 5) away matches won, 6) drawing of lots.

==== Knouckout Round ====
17 August 2019 Second Round	Hibernian	5–3	Greenock Morton	Edinburgh
19:45	Allan 20'; Vela 32'; Kamberi 55', 104'; Doidge 120'	Report	McHugh 39'; Stevenson 45' (o.g.); Whittaker 90+1' (o.g.)	Stadium: Easter Road; Attendance: 6,557; Referee: Alan Muir

=== Scottish Challenge Cup ===
7 September 2019 Third Round	Inverness CT	3–1	Greenock Morton	Inverness
19:45	Todorov 25'; Doran 31'; Storey 57'	Report	Sutton 78'	Stadium: Caledonian Stadium; Attendance: 1,021; Referee: Alan Muir

=== Scottish Cup ===
23 November 2019 Third Round	Greenock Morton	1–1	Brora Rangers	Greenock
15:00	McHugh 44' (pen.)	Summary	Dale Gillespie 29' (pen.); Martin MacLean (yellow card) 38'; Colin Williamson (yellow card) 44'; Tom Kelly (yellow card) 61'; James Wallace (yellow card) 86'	Stadium: Cappielow Park; Attendance: 925; Referee: (Scotland) Craig Napier

3 December 2019 Third Round Replay	Brora Rangers	1–3	Greenock Morton	Brora
19:45	Mark Nicolson (yellow card) 11'; Colin Williamson 65'; Martin MacLean (yellow card) 71'; Ally MacDonald (yellow card) 86'	Summary	Cadden (yellow card) 12' (goal) 49', 53'; Lyon 18'; Strapp (yellow card) 70'; Salkeld (yellow card) 86'	Stadium: Dudgeon Park; Attendance: 497; Referee: (Scotland) Craig Napier

18 January 2020 Fourth Round	St Johnstone	3–0	Greenock Morton	Perth
15:00	Booth 4'; Davidson 57'; May 74'	Report		Stadium: McDiarmid Park; Attendance: 2,397; Referee: (Scotland) Nick Walsh (referee)

== Transfers ==
=== Transfers in ===
Date	Position	Name	From	Fee	Ref.
1 July 2019	FW	Robbie Muirhead	Dunfermline Athletic	Free transfer	
1 July 2019	MF	Kyle Jacobs	Queen of the South	Free transfer	
1 July 2019	MF	Nicky Cadden	Livingston	Free transfer	
1 July 2019	MF	Aidan Nesbitt	Dundee United	Free transfer	
1 July 2019	MF	Kalvin Orsi	Brechin City	Free transfer	
1 July 2019	GK	Sam Ramsbottom	Alfreton Town	Free transfer	
1 July 2019	FW	Cameron Salkeld	Gateshead	Free transfer	
1 July 2019	FW	John Sutton	Came out of retirement	Free transfer	
8 July 2019	DF	Peter Grant	Carlisle United	Free transfer	
17 July 2019	DF	Brian McLean	Dumbarton	Free transfer	
23 August 2019	FW	Luca Colville	Free agent	Free transfer	
19 September 2019	FW	Billy King	Free agent	Free transfer	
29 January 2020	DF	Sean McGinty	Partick Thistle	Free transfer	
30 January 2020	FW	Craig McGuffie	Ayr United	Free transfer	
6 February 2020	FW	Kris Doolan	Ayr United	Free transfer	

=== Transfers out ===
Date	Position	Name	To	Fee	Ref.
1 July 2019	FW	Robert Thomson	Alloa Athletic	Free transfer	
1 July 2019	MF	Charlie Telfer	Falkirk	Free transfer	
1 July 2019	DF	Gregor Buchanan	Falkirk	Free transfer	
1 July 2019	MF	Michael Tidser	Falkirk	Free transfer	
1 July 2019	DF	Jack Iredale	Carlisle United	Free transfer	
1 July 2019	FW	Gary Oliver	Queen of the South	Free transfer	
1 July 2019	GK	Derek Gaston	Arbroath	Free transfer	
2 July 2019	DF	Lee Kilday	Queen of the South	Free transfer	
8 July 2019	FW	Denny Johnstone	Falkirk	Free transfer	
8 January 2020	MF	Billy King	St Patrick's Athletic	Free transfer	

=== Loans in ===
Date	Position	Name	From	End date	Ref.
26 July 2019	MF	Cameron Blues	Livingston	30 May 2020	
14 August 2019	GK	Danny Rogers	Aberdeen	30 May 2020	
29 August 2019	DF	Stephen Welsh	Celtic	30 May 2020	
2 September 2019	DF	Jack Baird	St Mirren	31 January 2020	
2 September 2019	DF	Adam Livingstone	Motherwell	30 May 2020	

=== Loans out ===
Start date	Position	Name	To	End date	Ref.
26 July 2019	MF	Dylan Dykes	Stenhousemuir	31 May 2020	
24 August 2019	DF	Reghan Tumilty	Dumbarton	6 January 2020	
