= Kris Doolan =

Scottish football manager (born 1986)

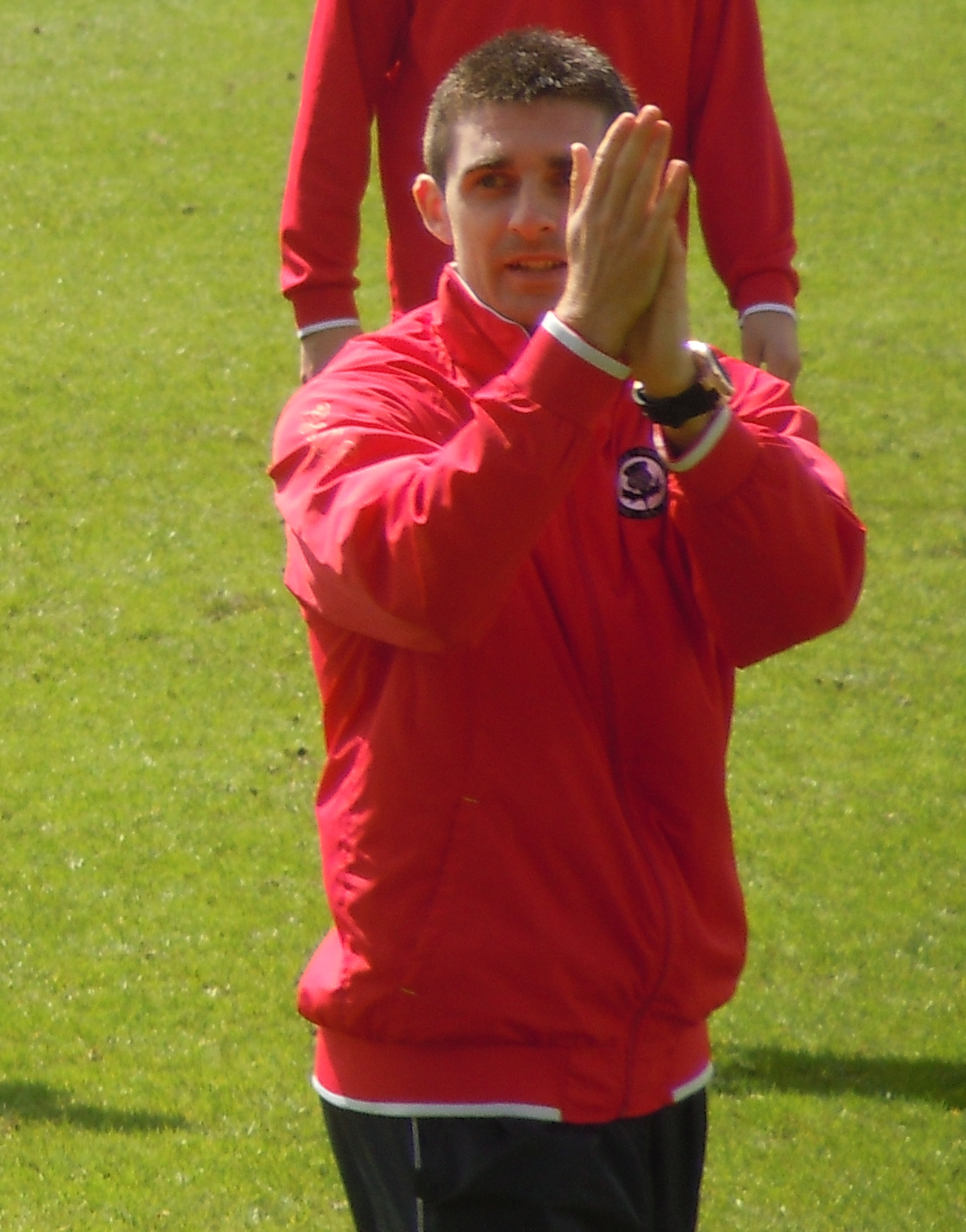
- Doolan in 2014

Personal information
- Full name: Kris Mark Doolan
- Date of birth: 11 December 1986 (age 39)
- Place of birth: Irvine, Scotland
- Height: 5 ft 10 in (1.78 m)
- Position: Striker

Senior career*
Years	Team	Apps	(Gls)
2003–2007	Kello Rovers		
2007–2009	Auchinleck Talbot		
2009–2019	Partick Thistle	332	(108)
2010	→ Clyde (loan)	9	(0)
2019–2020	Ayr United	11	(1)
2020	Greenock Morton	1	(0)
2020–2021	Arbroath	20	(3)
Total		382	(112)

International career
2008	Scotland Juniors	3	(0)

Managerial career
- 2023–2025: Partick Thistle
- 2025–2026: Kilmarnock (interim)
- * Club domestic league appearances and goals

Kris Mark Doolan (born 11 December 1986) is a Scottish professional football coach and former player.

Doolan played as a striker, spending the majority of his professional career at Partick Thistle. He also played for Kello Rovers, Auchinleck Talbot, Clyde, Ayr United, Greenock Morton and Arbroath. Doolan represented Scotland at junior level for the 2008 Junior International Quadrangular Tournament held on the Isle of Man.

Doolan studied Sport Coaching at Bell College, now University of the West of Scotland, in 2008.

Doolan joined Partick Thistle in 2009 after an impressive start to his career in the Scottish junior leagues with Kello Rovers and Auchinleck Talbot. He became one of their most prolific and consistent goal scorers in the club's history, currently in joint fourth position in the all-time top scorers list In recognition for his services to the club, Doolan was inducted into the Partick Thistle Hall of Fame in March 2019. He was released by Thistle at the end of the 2018–19 season and subsequently had short spells at Ayr United and Morton. After returning to Thistle as a youth coach at the Thistle Weir Youth Academy, Doolan was appointed Partick Thistle manager in 2023.

== Playing career ==
=== Junior football ===
Born in Irvine, he began his career by playing in the Junior leagues, first with a two-year stint at Kello Rovers, before moving on to Auchinleck Talbot. He had a successful time at Beechwood Park, and eventually went on trial for Scottish First Division club Partick Thistle.

=== Partick Thistle ===
==== 2009–10 ====
Following a successful trial which began in October 2008, despite interest from Scottish Premier League sides Kilmarnock and Motherwell Doolan was signed by Partick manager Ian McCall on an 18-month deal from Auchinleck on 9 January 2009. He made his debut on 10 January 2009, in a 3–0 defeat against Inverness Caledonian Thistle in a Scottish Cup tie. His first goal for the club came on 24 January 2009, against Queen of the South.

On 5 February 2010, Doolan was sent out on loan to Clyde to help them try to avoid relegation to the Third Division. After returning to Firhill, Doolan struggled to cement his place in the starting eleven. However, he subsequently scored a spectacular 92nd-minute goal on the final day of the 2009–10 season against Queen of the South to give The Jags a 1–0 victory. Doolan was Thistle's top scorer in the 2010–11 season with 18 goals.

==== 2012–13 ====
During the 2012–13 season Doolan was named as Scottish Football League Player of the Month for March 2013. On 7 April 2013, he scored in the last seconds of extra-time against Queen of the South in the 2013 Scottish Challenge Cup Final to make it 1–1 and take the match to penalties. Doolan scored with his kick, however Partick Thistle were defeated 6–5. Doolan's goals helped Thistle secure the 2012–13 Scottish First Division title and subsequent promotion to the new Scottish Premiership.

==== 2013–14 ====
Having gained promotion, Doolan signed a new two-year contract on 21 May 2013. Doolan scored his first top-flight goal for Thistle in their 3–1 away victory against Ross County at the Global Energy Stadium. Following a poor run of results for Thistle, striker Lyle Taylor was brought in on loan from Sheffield United in the January transfer window. Goals from Doolan and Taylor eventually helped Thistle secure their place in the Scottish Premiership for the 2014–15 season.

==== 2014–15 ====
On 24 May 2014, Doolan extended his contract with Partick Thistle by another two years, keeping him at the club until May 2016.

Doolan scored his first goal of the 2014–15 season in a 1–0 Scottish League Cup away win to Greenock Morton in the on 26 August 2014. As of 18 October 2014, Doolan had played 203 games and has scored 70 goals in all competitions for Partick Thistle. On 21 January 2015, Doolan scored four goals against Hamilton Academical in a 5–0 win at Firhill, making him the first Thistle player to score four goals in a top-flight match since George Shaw in 1992, and the first footballer to score a perfect hat-trick in the Scottish Premiership since its formation in 2013.

==== 2015–16 ====
On 18 January 2016, during the January transfer window, Doolan signed a new contract extension with Thistle to keep him at the club until the summer of 2019. The contract will take him to 10 years of service, and consequently a testimonial year.

==== 2016–17 ====
Doolan scored his first goal of the 2016–17 season in a League Cup group stage tie scoring the winner against Airdrieonians. He scored his first league goal of the season in a 2–0 away win against Dundee at Dens Park making it 2–0 with a second half strike. Doolan scored his 100th, and then 101st professional goal for Partick Thistle on 1 April 2017 against Ross County at Firhill.

==== 2017–18 ====
On 21 April 2018, Doolan scored his 100th league goal in a crucial post-split fixture against Hamilton, making him the first ever Partick Thistle player to score 100 league goals. He played in both legs of the Premiership play-offs against Livingston, scoring his club's only goal in the tie as they were defeated 3–1 on aggregate and relegated to the Championship.

==== 2018–19: Last season at Firhill ====
On 1 September 2018, in a league match at Firhill against Greenock Morton, Doolan scored a legitimate goal which was not awarded: the ball struck the underside of the crossbar from his shot, bounced on the solid tube holding the net to the ground, came back out of the goal area and was kicked into touch by a frustrated defender. The minimal movement of the net itself deceived the referee Barry Cook into believing the ball had not crossed the line and he awarded a throw-in, despite the usual reactions of the home team and fans celebrating and the away team starting to walk back to their positions to kick off. Thistle still won 1–0 despite the error and Doolan was awarded a goal bonus which he donated to charity, with the amount matched by the club.

A similar incident had occurred at the same end of the same stadium in 1993 when a shot by Dundee United's Paddy Connolly entered the goal and rebounded off the supporting stanchion, but was not awarded even though a defender then caught the ball and handed it to the goalkeeper.

On 16 March 2019, Doolan was inducted into the Partick Thistle Hall of Fame at Firhill Stadium. Teammates and friends including Chris Erskine, Steven Lawless, Scott McDonald and Gary Harkins were in attendance, alongside Manager Gary Caldwell. On 23 April 2019, Doolan made his 400th appearance for the club, coming on as a substitute for McDonald against Ayr United.

After a difficult return season to the Championship, with the club having successfully fought off further relegation, on 9 May 2019, manager Gary Caldwell informed Doolan that his contract with Thistle would not be renewed, bringing to an end his 10-year stay at the Firhill club. Partick Thistle chairman Jacqui Low stated: "Kris is, and always will be, a legend at Partick Thistle Football Club. Legend is an overused word but he has earned that title. The service he has given to the club both on and off the pitch is almost unmatched."

Doolan ended his Thistle career with 401 appearances, 121 goals and 34 assists.

=== Ayr United ===
On 24 June 2019, Doolan signed a one-year deal with Ayr United and once again linked up with then former Thistle manager, Ian McCall. Doolan scored twice on his Ayr United debut as Ayr beat Berwick Rangers 7-0 in the league cup. Doolan scored his first league goal for Ayr against former club Partick Thistle in a 3-2 win at Firhill. Doolan was released from his contract with the club on 30 January 2020.

=== Greenock Morton ===
On 6 February 2020, Doolan signed until June 2020 with Greenock Morton After the season was cut short by the coronavirus pandemic, Doolan left Morton on 1 August 2020.

=== Arbroath ===
On 14 August 2020, Doolan signed with Arbroath.

=== International career ===
Doolan's form at Auchinleck Talbot was recognised by the Scottish Junior Football Association (SJFA) with his selection for the Umbro Quadrangular Tournament in 2008. He appeared in all three matches at the tournament and tallied one goal against Northern Ireland in a 4–3 victory.

=== Style of play ===
"First and foremost he's one of the best professionals I've worked with. He's great about the place, gives everything he's got in training. He's an all-round model professional, and one that I think every young player at Thistle should look up to, take lessons from his work ethic and watch how he goes about his business. He's a role model with a great attitude to his work."

— Scott Paterson, January 2016

It is believed Doolan's talent was brought out due to the small and difficult pitches used by junior football clubs. Auchinleck Talbot scouts noted his ability to find space and utilise his "explosive pace." Along with his playing ability, he has been described as a "model professional", with leadership ability and commitment to his club.

Similarly to teammate former Thistle teammate Chris Erskine, his emergence from the Scottish junior leagues has been a testament to his success and work ethic as a player and has further proven the quality and potential of younger players in the junior football leagues.

== Coaching career ==
After retiring as a player, Doolan set up a coaching academy in Ayrshire and also coached in a SFA Elite Performance School.

=== Partick Thistle ===
Doolan returned to Partick Thistle in January 2023, as he became a coach in the Thistle Weir Youth Academy. He became the Partick Thistle first team caretaker manager a month later, following the club's dismissal of manager Ian McCall. After three games in interim charge, winning two and drawing the other, Doolan was appointed manager on a permanent basis.

In Doolan's first season in charge, Thistle finished fourth in the Scottish Championship and reached the 2022-23 Scottish Premiership Playoff Final, where they lost 5–4 on penalties to Ross County, who had finished 11th in the Scottish Premiership, despite Thistle having a 3–0 aggregate lead in the 70th minute. Had Thistle won the tie, they would have made history as the first side to be promoted after finishing fourth in the second tier.

In Doolan's first full season in charge, Thistle finished 3rd in the Scottish Championship, meaning they once again entered the Scottish Premiership play offs. Thistle beat 4th place Airdrie 3–2 on aggregate to progress to the play-off semi-finals, where they faced 2nd placed Raith Rovers. Thistle lost the first leg at home to Raith 2–1, but won the away leg 2–1, meaning the tie went to extra time. No winner could be found by either side, therefore the tie progressed to a penalty shootout, which Raith won 4–3.

Thistle struggled for consistency in the 2024–25 season, spending much of the season in 4th place. Following a poor run of form Doolan left his position as manager on February 18, 2025.

=== Kilmarnock ===
Doolan was set to be appointed Head of Development and Under-19s coach at Kilmarnock. However, after the sacking of Stuart Kettlewell in December 2025, Doolan took charge of the first team on an interim basis. He held this position until 6 January 2026, when Neil McCann was appointed manager.

== Personal life ==
Doolan's second cousin Stephen McManus was also a footballer, mainly for Celtic and Motherwell.

== Career statistics ==
As of 30 April 2021

Appearances and goals by club, season and competition
Club	Season	League			Scottish Cup		League Cup		Other		Total	
Club	Season	Division	Apps	Goals	Apps	Goals	Apps	Goals	Apps	Goals	Apps	Goals
Partick Thistle	2008–09	Scottish First Division	16	5	1	0	0	0	0	0	17	5
Partick Thistle	2009–10	Scottish First Division	17	2	0	0	0	0	2 (Note: Appearances in the Scottish Challenge Cup)	1	19	2
Partick Thistle	2010–11	Scottish First Division	33	15	2	1	1	0	4	2	40	18
Partick Thistle	2011–12	Scottish First Division	34	13	3	0	1	0	2	0	40	13
Partick Thistle	2012–13	Scottish First Division	33	13	2	0	2	0	4	2	41	15
Partick Thistle	2013–14	Scottish Premiership	35	11	1	0	2	0	—		38	11
Partick Thistle	2014–15	Scottish Premiership	35	9	2	0	3	1	—		40	10
Partick Thistle	2015–16	Scottish Premiership	36	14	2	0	1	0	—		39	14
Partick Thistle	2016–17	Scottish Premiership	37	14	3	0	5	1	—		45	15
Partick Thistle	2017–18	Scottish Premiership	33	6	2	1	5	3	2 (Note: Appearances in the Scottish Premiership play-offs)	1	42	11
Partick Thistle	2018–19	Scottish Championship	30	6	2	0	5	0	2	0	39	6
Partick Thistle	Total		332	105	20	2	25	5	16	6	401	121
Clyde (loan)	2009–10	Scottish Second Division	9	0	0	0	0	0	0	0	9	0
Ayr United	2019–20	Scottish Championship	11	1	1	0	4	2	1	0	17	3
Greenock Morton	2019–20	Scottish Championship	1	0	0	0	0	0	0	0	1	0
Arbroath	2020–21	Scottish Championship	20	3	0	0	5	0	0	0	25	3
Career total			373	109	21	2	34	7	17	6	453	127

== Managerial statistics ==
As of match played 3 January 2026

Team	From	To	Record				
Team	From	To	G	W	D	L	Win %
Partick Thistle	11 February 2023	18 February 2025	99	43	30	26	43.43
Kilmarnock	15 December 2025	6 January 2026	4	0	1	3	0.00
Total			103	43	31	29	41.75

== Honours ==
=== Club ===
Partick Thistle

- Scottish First Division champions: 2012–13
- Scottish Challenge Cup runners–up: 2012–13

=== International ===
Scotland Junior team

- Umbro Trophy winners: 2008

=== Individual ===
- Scottish First Division Player of the Month: March 2013
