= 2020–21 Greenock Morton F.C. season =

Greenock Morton
2020–21 season
- Owner: Golden Casket Group
- Chairman: Crawford Rae
- Manager: David Hopkin (until 10 December); Gus McPherson (from 10 March)
- Stadium: Cappielow Park
- Scottish Championship: 9th
- Scottish Cup: Fourth Round
- Scottish League Cup: Group Stage
| Home colours | Away colours | Third colours |
- All statistics correct as of 30 April 2021.

The 2020–21 season is Greenock Morton's sixth consecutive season in the Scottish Championship, following their promotion from Scottish League One in the 2014–15 season. They will also compete in the Scottish Cup and Scottish League Cup.

== Season summary ==
In June 2020, eight of the ten clubs voted in favour of shortening the season from the usual 36 games to 27 (playing each other three times), with the season tentatively scheduled to start on 16 October 2020. This was done to reduce costs in light of the coronavirus pandemic.

== Competitions ==
=== Scottish Championship ===
==== Matches ====
| Win | Draw | Loss |

| Date | Opponent | Venue | Result (Note: Greenock Morton's score written first) | Scorers | Attendance | Ref. |
|---|---|---|---|---|---|---|
| 17 October 2020 | Alloa Athletic | Home | 1–0 | Salkeld 10' | 0 (Note: Match played behind closed doors) | |
| 24 October 2020 | Dundee | Away | 0–1 | — | 0 | |
| 31 October 2020 | Ayr United | Home | 3–2 | Oliver 83', Blues 85', Strapp 88' | 0 | |
| 7 November 2020 | Raith Rovers | Away | 0–5 | — | 0 | |
| 21 November 2020 | Arbroath | Away | 0–0 | — | 0 | |
| 5 December 2020 | Heart of Midlothian | Home | 0–2 | — | 0 | |
| 12 December 2020 | Dunfermline Athletic | Away | 2–1 | McAlister 24', McGuffie 79' | 0 | |
| 19 December 2020 | Queen of the South | Home | 2–0 | Orsi 41', 76' | 0 | |
| 29 December 2020 | Ayr United | Away | 1–1 | Nesbitt 26' pen. | 0 | |
| 2 January 2021 | Alloa Athletic | Away | 1–1 | Fjørtoft 69' | 0 | |
| 15 January 2021 | Dunfermline Athletic | Home | 0–0 | — | 0 | |
| 23 January 2021 | Queen of the South | Away | 1–2 | Orsi 58' | 0 | |
| 27 January 2021 | Inverness CT | Home | 2–2 | McGinty 3', Blues 66' | 0 | |
| 30 January 2021 | Arbroath | Home | 0–1 | — | 0 | |
| 6 February 2021 | Raith Rovers | Home | 0–1 | — | 0 | |
| 20 February 2021 | Heart of Midlothian | Away | 1–1 | McGuffie 53' | 0 | |
| 27 February 2021 | Dundee | Home | 2–2 | McGuffie 41', Colville 69' | 0 | |
| 6 March 2021 | Ayr United | Home | 0–2 | — | 0 | |
| 9 March 2021 | Inverness CT | Away | 1–0 | Nesbitt 56' | 0 | |
| 13 March 2021 | Dunfermline Athletic | Away | 0–1 | — | 0 | |
| 20 March 2021 | Queen of the South | Home | 2–1 | Nesbitt 19' Oliver 61' | 0 | |
| 27 March 2021 | Raith Rovers | Away | 0–1 | — | 0 | |
| 6 April 2021 | Inverness CT | Home | 1–4 | Muirhead 61' | 0 | |
| 10 April 2021 | Dundee | Away | 1–1 | Nesbitt 78' | 0 | |
| 20 April 2021 | Heart of Midlothian | Home | 0–0 | — | 0 | |
| 24 April 2021 | Alloa Athletic | Home | 1–1 | Fjørtoft 55' | 0 | |
| 30 April 2021 | Arbroath | Away | 0–0 | — | 0 | |

=== Scottish Championship Play–off ===
==== Matches ====
| Round | Date | Opponent | Venue | Result | Scorers | Attendance | Ref. |
|---|---|---|---|---|---|---|---|
| Semi-Final 1st Leg | 8 May 2021 | Montrose | Away | 1–2 | Oliver 5' | 0 | |
| Semi-Final 2nd Leg | 11 May 2021 | Montrose | Home | 3–1 (4–3 agg.) (aet.) | Oliver 5', Salkeld 19' McGuffie 120' | 0 | |
| Final 1st Leg | 18 May 2021 | Airdrieonians | Away | 1–0 | Muirhead 90+4' | 0 | |
| Final 2nd Leg | 21 May 2021 | Airdrieonians | Home | 3–0 (4–0 agg.) (aet.) | Muirhead 12', 78', Oliver 44' | 0 | |

==== League table ====
| Pos | Team | Pld | W | D | L | GF | GA | GD | Pts | Promotion, qualification or relegation |
|---|---|---|---|---|---|---|---|---|---|---|
| 6 | Queen of the South | 27 | 9 | 5 | 13 | 38 | 51 | −13 | 32 | |
| 7 | Arbroath | 27 | 7 | 9 | 11 | 28 | 34 | −6 | 30 | |
| 8 | Ayr United | 27 | 6 | 11 | 10 | 31 | 37 | −6 | 29 | |
| 9 | Greenock Morton (O) | 27 | 6 | 11 | 10 | 22 | 33 | −11 | 29 | Qualification for the Championship play-offs |
| 10 | Alloa Athletic (R) | 27 | 5 | 7 | 15 | 30 | 60 | −30 | 22 | Relegation to League One |

Source: SPFL
Rules for classification: 1) Points; 2) Goal difference; 3) Goals scored; 4) Head-to-to head points; 5) Head-to-head goal difference; 6) Play-off (only for deciding promotion, play-off participation and relegation).
(O) Play-off winners; (R) Relegated

=== Scottish League Cup ===
==== Group stage ====
| Pos | Team | Pld | W | PW | PL | L | GF | GA | GD | Pts | Qualification | STM | QOS | PAR | GMO | QPK |
|---|---|---|---|---|---|---|---|---|---|---|---|---|---|---|---|---|
| 1 | St Mirren | 4 | 2 | 2 | 0 | 0 | 8 | 4 | +4 | 10 | Qualification for the Second round | — | — | 4–1 | p1–1 | — |
| 2 | Queen of the South | 4 | 1 | 1 | 2 | 0 | 7 | 5 | +2 | 7 | | 2–2p | — | 0–0p | — | — |
| 3 | Partick Thistle | 4 | 1 | 2 | 0 | 1 | 3 | 4 | −1 | 7 | | — | — | — | p0–0 | 2–0 |
| 4 | Greenock Morton | 4 | 1 | 0 | 3 | 0 | 4 | 3 | +1 | 6 | | — | 2–2p | — | — | 1–0 |
| 5 | Queen's Park | 4 | 0 | 0 | 0 | 4 | 1 | 7 | −6 | 0 | | 0–1 | 1–3 | — | — | — |

Rules for classification: 1) points, 2) goal difference, 3) goals scored, 4) away goals scored, 5) matches won, 6) away matches won, 7) drawing of lots.

| Win | Draw | Loss |

| Date | Opponent | Venue | Result | Scorers | Attendance | Ref. |
|---|---|---|---|---|---|---|
| 6 October 2020 | Queen of the South | Home | 2–2 (2–4 p) | McGinty 18', Nesbitt 68' | 0 | |
| 13 October 2020 | Queen's Park | Home | 1–0 | Blues 51' | 0 | |
| 11 November 2020 | St Mirren | Away | 1–1 (5–6 p) | MacIver 60' | 0 | |
| 14 November 2020 | Partick Thistle | Away | 0–0 (2–4 p) | — | 0 | |

=== Scottish Cup ===
| Round | Date | Opponent | Venue | Result | Scorers | Attendance | Ref. |
|---|---|---|---|---|---|---|---|
| Second Round | 23 March 2021 | Dunfermline Athletic | Home | 0–0 (6–5 p) | — | 0 | |
| Third Round | 3 April 2021 | East Fife | Away | 2–1 (aet.) | McGinty 91' pen., Muirhead 112' | 0 | |
| Fourth Round | 17 April 2021 | Motherwell | Away | 1–1 (3–5 p) | Fjørtoft 120+3' | 0 | |
