= Sean McGinty =

English-born Irish footballer

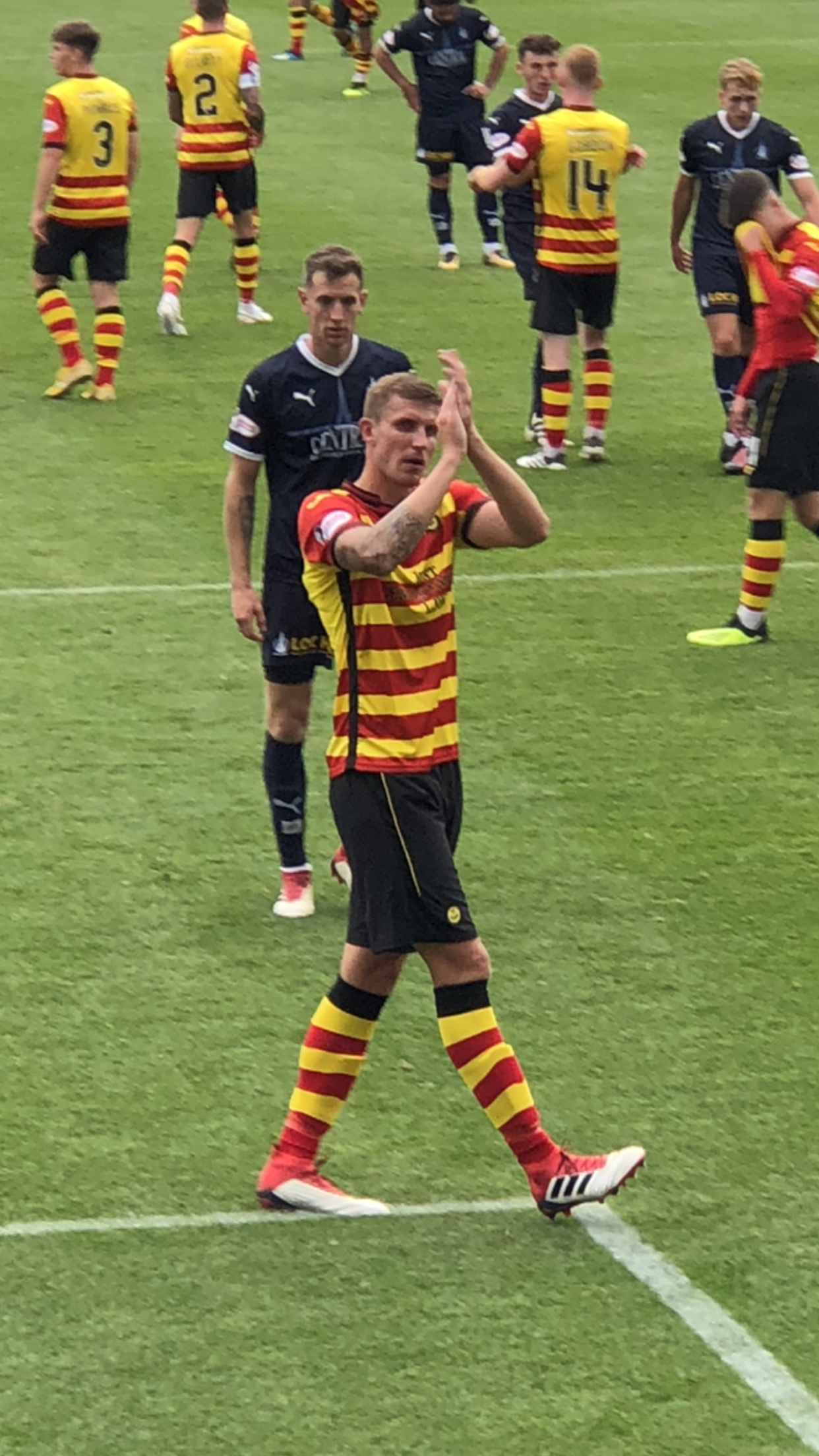

Personal information
- Full name: Sean Andrew McGinty
- Date of birth: 11 August 1993 (age 33)
- Place of birth: Maidstone, England
- Height: 6 ft 5 in (1.96 m)
- Position: Defender

Team information
- Current team: Montrose
- Number: 4

Youth career
- 2006–2009: Charlton Athletic
- 2009–2011: Manchester United

Senior career*
Years	Team	Apps	(Gls)
2011–2013	Manchester United	0	(0)
2012	→ Morecambe (loan)	4	(0)
2012	→ Oxford United (loan)	0	(0)
2012–2013	→ Carlisle United (loan)	1	(0)
2013	→ Tranmere Rovers (loan)	3	(0)
2013–2014	Sheffield United	2	(0)
2014	→ Northampton Town (loan)	2	(0)
2014	→ Rochdale (loan)	1	(0)
2014–2015	Rochdale	0	(0)
2014	→ FC Halifax Town (loan)	2	(0)
2015	→ Aldershot Town (loan)	13	(0)
2015–2016	Aldershot Town	24	(1)
2016–2018	Torquay United	92	(6)
2018–2020	Partick Thistle	47	(0)
2020–2021	Greenock Morton	34	(2)
2021–2024	Ayr United	92	(5)
2024–2025	Hamilton Academical	35	(2)
2025–2026	Airdrieonians	25	(1)
2026–	Montrose	15	(0)

International career
2009–2010	Republic of Ireland U17	7	(0)
2010–2012	Republic of Ireland U19	11	(2)
2013–2014	Republic of Ireland U21	10	(0)
- * Club domestic league appearances and goals as of 19:48, 15 November 2026 (UTC)

Sean Andrew McGinty (born 11 August 1993) is a professional footballer who plays as a defender for Scottish League One club Montrose.

After a spell with Charlton Athletic as a junior, he began his professional career with Manchester United. Having failed to break into the United first team, he had loan spells at Morecambe, Oxford United, Carlisle United and Tranmere Rovers before signing for Sheffield United on a permanent basis. He had loan spells at Northampton Town and Rochdale, signing permanently for the latter at the end of his only season in Sheffield. He then spent time on loan at FC Halifax Town and Aldershot Town before again making the move permanent.

In June 2016, he signed for Torquay United, where he spent two seasons before moving to Scottish club Partick Thistle. In 2020, he would leave to join Greenock Morton for a season. In the summer of 2021, McGinty signed a two-year deal with Ayr United, following his previous manager David Hopkin.

Born in Maidstone, Kent, he played internationally for the Republic of Ireland at under-17, under-19 and under-21 level.

== Club career ==
=== Manchester United ===
McGinty spent three years in the youth setup at Charlton Athletic before moving to Manchester United in July 2009. He progressed through the youth academy and was part of the side that won the 2010–11 FA Youth Cup, before signing a pro contract in the summer of 2011. On 27 February 2012, McGinty signed for Football League Two side Morecambe on an initial loan until 31 March, with an option to extend. He made his debut the next day in a 2–1 defeat to Dagenham & Redbridge at the Globe Arena. On 12 March 2012, McGinty returned to Manchester United after he dislocated his shoulder in the match against Hereford United.

McGinty moved to Oxford United on a six-month loan on 17 July 2012. Although the loan did not officially go through until 4 August, he went straight into Oxford's team for their pre-season matches. He made his first-team debut for Oxford, playing at left back, in a 3–0 defeat to Leeds United in the second round of the League Cup. On 13 September 2012, McGinty's loan to Oxford United was terminated and he returned to Manchester United.

On 6 November 2012, McGinty joined Carlisle United on loan until 4 December 2012, before Carlisle United extended his loan until 5 January 2013. He returned to Manchester United at the end of the loan, but was again sent out on loan to Tranmere Rovers on the emergency loan deadline day on 28 March 2013. On his release from the Red Devils, McGinty stated "I made a few stupid mistakes along the way at Manchester United. I was young but I believe the only way you do learn is by making mistakes. I have learned from them and that's water under the bridge now. I know what happened and I will never make those mistakes again. I believe they have made me a stronger person and I will be a better player because of it."

=== Sheffield United ===
On 25 June 2013, McGinty signed for League One club Sheffield United on a two-year contract with the option of a third year, and made his professional début for Sheffield United on 17 August 2013 against Colchester United at Bramall Lane in a 1–1 draw. McGinty was unable to break into the first team on a regular basis however, making only three appearances for the club during the first half of the 2013–14 season. Following the arrival of new manager Nigel Clough in October, McGinty's chances appeared to be further limited and in January 2014, he joined Northampton Town on loan. McGinty spent a month at Northampton, making two appearances for The Cobblers before returning to Bramall Lane at the start of February. On 23 March 2014, McGinty joined Rochdale on loan for the rest of the season, where he played once before returning to Bramall Lane. McGinty was released by Sheffield United on 16 May 2014.

=== Rochdale ===
On 20 May 2014, McGinty signed a one-year deal with former loan club Rochdale.

On 11 November 2014, McGinty signed for Halifax Town on a month-long loan, after struggling to make the Rochdale first team. He was released by Rochdale at the end of the season.

=== Aldershot Town ===
On 20 February 2015, McGinty joined Conference Premier side Aldershot Town on an initial one-month loan, which was then extended until the end of the season. Following his successful loan from February to April 2015, he signed a one-year contract with the club.

=== Torquay United ===
On 21 June 2016, preceding his release from Aldershot Town, McGinty joined fellow National League side Torquay United.

=== Partick Thistle ===
On 18 June 2018, McGinty was signed by Scottish Championship club Partick Thistle on a two-year deal. McGinty became a favourite with the Thistle fans, known for his passionate celebrations and connection with the supporters. He was named club captain in August 2019. McGinty left Thistle in January 2020, after making 64 appearances for the club.

=== Greenock Morton ===
On 28 January 2020, McGinty signed for fellow Championship club Greenock Morton, on a contract until the end of the season.

=== Ayr United ===
On 27 May 2021, McGinty signed for fellow Championship club Ayr United, following his ex-manager at Morton David Hopkin to the club.

=== Hamilton Academical ===
On 16 June 2024, McGinty signed with Hamilton Academical after being released by Ayr United.

== Career statistics ==
As of match played 13 December 2025

Appearances and goals by club, season and competition
Club	Season	League			National cup (Note: Includes FA Cup, Scottish Cup)		League cup (Note: Includes EFL Cup, Scottish League Cup)		Other		Total	
Club	Season	Division	Apps	Goals	Apps	Goals	Apps	Goals	Apps	Goals	Apps	Goals
Manchester United	2011–12	Premier League	0	0	0	0	0	0	0	0	0	0
Manchester United	2012–13	Premier League	0	0	0	0	0	0	0	0	0	0
Manchester United	Total		0	0	0	0	0	0	0	0	0	0
Morecambe (loan)	2011–12	League Two	4	0	0	0	0	0	0	0	4	0
Oxford United (loan)	2012–13	League Two	0	0	0	0	1	0	1 (Note: Appearance(s) in Football League Trophy)	0	2	0
Carlisle United (loan)	2012–13	League One	1	0	0	0	0	0	0	0	1	0
Tranmere Rovers (loan)	2012–13	League One	3	0	0	0	0	0	0	0	3	0
Sheffield United	2013–14	League One	2	0	0	0	0	0	1	0	3	0
Northampton Town (loan)	2013–14	League Two	2	0	0	0	0	0	0	0	2	0
Rochdale (loan)	2013–14	League Two	1	0	0	0	0	0	0	0	1	0
Rochdale	2014–15	League Two	0	0	0	0	0	0	0	0	0	0
FC Halifax Town (loan)	2014–15	Conference Premier	2	0	0	0	—		0	0	2	0
Aldershot Town (loan)	2014–15	Conference Premier	13	0	0	0	—		0	0	13	0
Aldershot Town	2015–16	National League	24	1	3	0	—		1 (Note: Appearance(s) in FA Trophy)	0	28	1
Torquay United	2016–17	National League	46	2	2	0	—		1	0	49	2
Torquay United	2017–18	National League	46	4	1	0	—		1	0	48	4
Torquay United	Total		92	6	3	0	0	0	2	0	97	6
Partick Thistle	2018–19	Scottish Championship	28	0	2	0	5	0	1 (Note: Appearances in the Scottish Challenge Cup)	0	36	0
Partick Thistle	2019–20	Scottish Championship	19	0	1	0	6	0	2	0	28	0
Partick Thistle	Total		47	0	3	0	11	0	3	0	64	0
Greenock Morton	2019–20	Scottish Championship	7	1	0	0	0	0	0	0	7	1
Greenock Morton	2020–21	Scottish Championship	27	1	3	1	4	1	—		34	3
Greenock Morton	Total		34	2	3	1	4	1	0	0	41	4
Ayr United	2021–22	Scottish Championship	28	1	2	0	4	0	1	0	35	1
Ayr United	2022–23	Scottish Championship	33	3	4	0	3	0	3 (Note: Appearances in the Scottish Premiership Play-Offs)	0	43	3
Ayr United	2023–24	Scottish Championship	31	1	3	1	5	0	1	0	40	2
Ayr United	Total		92	5	9	1	12	0	5	0	118	6
Hamilton Academical	2024–25	Scottish Championship	35	2	3	1	4	1	2	0	44	4
Airdrieonians	2025–26	Scottish Championship	18	1	1	0	4	0	1	0	24	1
Career total			370	17	25	3	36	2	16	0	447	22
