= Craig McGuffie =

Scottish footballer

Personal information
- Full name: Craig Crawford McGuffie
- Date of birth: 15 December 1997 (age 28)
- Place of birth: Irvine, Scotland
- Position: Midfielder

Team information
- Current team: East Kilbride
- Number: 11

Youth career
- Ayr United

Senior career*
| Years | Team | Apps | (Gls) |
| 2015–2020 | Ayr United | 77 | (5) |
| 2015–2016 | → Glenafton Athletic (loan) | 27 | (2) |
| 2019 | → Raith Rovers (loan) | 13 | (3) |
| 2020–2021 | Greenock Morton | 20 | (4) |
| 2021–2023 | Falkirk | 62 | (8) |
| 2023–2024 | Queen of the South | 21 | (3) |
| 2024–2025 | Dumbarton | 33 | (2) |
| 2025–2026 | Peterhead | 34 | (5) |
| 2026– | East Kilbride | 4 | (2) |
- * Club domestic league appearances and goals as of 27 August 2026

Craig McGuffie (born 15 December 1997) is a Scottish footballer who last played as a midfielder for Scottish League One club East Kilbride.

== Career ==
McGuffie came through the Ayr United Football Academy. In January 2015, he signed with Glenafton Athletic on a loan deal that lasted until the end of the 2014–15 season. He spent the majority of the following season at Glenafton again, having signed another one-year loan deal in August 2015, but returned to Ayr United to make his debut in the SPFL, coming on as an 87th-minute substitute for Alan Forrest in a 1–0 defeat to Albion Rovers. In May 2016, McGuffie signed a new year-long deal, keeping him at the club until the end of the 2016–17 season. During this season, McGuffie continued to make more appearances off the bench as he had impressed manager Ian McCall with his under-20s performances.

McGuffie started his first game for Ayr on 23 July 2016, against Edinburgh City in the Scottish League Cup, and followed this up with his first goal for the club in another League Cup win, this time over Livingston. It would prove to be a breakthrough season for McGuffie but an unimpressive season for Ayr. The club were relegated on the final day of the season, but had a good run in the Scottish Cup, reaching the quarter-finals where they were knocked out by Hibernian. McGuffie scored a brilliant 25 yard goal which would eventually be crowned goal of the competition.

In the 2017–18 season McGuffie started off by scoring in a 6–1 demolition of Annan Athletic. He played a bit part role mainly coming on as a substitute, but found it hard to break in to the free scoring side. He did make an impact coming on against Queen's Park and scoring a brace in a 4–1 win for Ayr. He followed this up by playing the role of super-sub when he scored a late equaliser against Arbroath. This goal proved crucial as it sent Ayr to the top of the table on goal difference.

On 24 January 2019, McGuffie moved on loan to Raith Rovers until the end of the season.

On 30 January 2020, McGuffie signed for Greenock Morton on an eighteen-month contract.

During June 2021, McGuffie signed for Falkirk on a two-year deal. On 4 March 2023, McGuffie scored a hat-trick against Peterhead after coming on as a substitute in the 76th minute; the first of these goals was a half volley scored from inside his own half.

On 14 June 2023, McGuffie signed a one-year contract with Queen of the South. After a season at Palmerston he signed for Dumbarton in June 2024. He played 41 times scoring five times as the Sons were relegated after going into administration, before leaving the club in the summer of 2025.

== Career statistics ==
As of 15:48, 3 May 2025 (UTC)

Appearances and goals by club, season and competition
| Club | Season | League | | | Scottish Cup | | League Cup | | Other | | Total | |
| Club | Season | Division | Apps | Goals | Apps | Goals | Apps | Goals | Apps | Goals | Apps | Goals |
|---|---|---|---|---|---|---|---|---|---|---|---|---|
| Ayr United | 2014–15 | Scottish League One | 0 | 0 | 0 | 0 | 0 | 0 | 0 | 0 | 0 | 0 |
| Ayr United | 2015–16 | Scottish League One | 1 | 0 | 0 | 0 | 0 | 0 | 0 | 0 | 1 | 0 |
| Ayr United | 2016–17 | Scottish Championship | 26 | 0 | 6 | 1 | 5 | 1 | 3 (Note: Appearances in the Scottish Challenge Cup) | 1 | 40 | 3 |
| Ayr United | 2017–18 | Scottish League One | 29 | 3 | 3 | 0 | 4 | 1 | 2 | 0 | 38 | 4 |
| Ayr United | 2018–19 | Scottish Championship | 9 | 0 | 2 | 0 | 4 | 0 | 1 | 0 | 16 | 0 |
| Ayr United | 2019–20 | Scottish Championship | 12 | 2 | 0 | 0 | 3 | 1 | 0 | 0 | 15 | 3 |
| Ayr United | Total | | 77 | 5 | 11 | 1 | 16 | 3 | 6 | 1 | 110 | 10 |
| Glenafton Athletic (loan) | 2014–15 | WSSL - Premier Division | 8 | 0 | 0 | 0 | 0 | 0 | 2 | 0 | 10 | 0 |
| Glenafton Athletic (loan) | 2015–16 | WSSL - Premier Division | 19 | 2 | 0 | 0 | 0 | 0 | 15 | 7 | 34 | 9 |
| Glenafton Athletic (loan) | Total | | 27 | 2 | 0 | 0 | 0 | 0 | 17 | 7 | 44 | 9 |
| Raith Rovers (loan) | 2018–19 | Scottish League One | 13 | 3 | 0 | 0 | 0 | 0 | 2 (Note: Appearances in the Scottish Championship play-offs) | 0 | 15 | 3 |
| Greenock Morton | 2019–20 | Scottish Championship | 4 | 1 | 0 | 0 | 0 | 0 | 0 | 0 | 4 | 1 |
| Greenock Morton | 2020–21 | Scottish Championship | 16 | 3 | 3 | 0 | 3 | 0 | 0 | 0 | 22 | 3 |
| Greenock Morton | Total | | 20 | 4 | 3 | 0 | 3 | 0 | 0 | 0 | 26 | 4 |
| Falkirk | 2021-22 | Scottish League One | 34 | 4 | 1 | 0 | 2 | 0 | 1 | 0 | 38 | 4 |
| Falkirk | 2022-23 | Scottish League One | 28 | 4 | 3 | 2 | 5 | 1 | 2 | 0 | 38 | 7 |
| Falkirk | Total | | 62 | 8 | 4 | 2 | 7 | 1 | 3 | 0 | 76 | 11 |
| Queen of the South | 2023-24 | Scottish League One | 21 | 3 | 2 | 0 | 3 | 0 | 1 | 1 | 27 | 4 |
| Dumbarton | 2024–25 | Scottish League One | 33 | 2 | 2 | 1 | 4 | 0 | 2 | 2 | 41 | 5 |
| Career total | | | 252 | 27 | 22 | 4 | 33 | 4 | 31 | 11 | 340 | 46 |
