= Cameron Salkeld =

English footballer (born 1998)

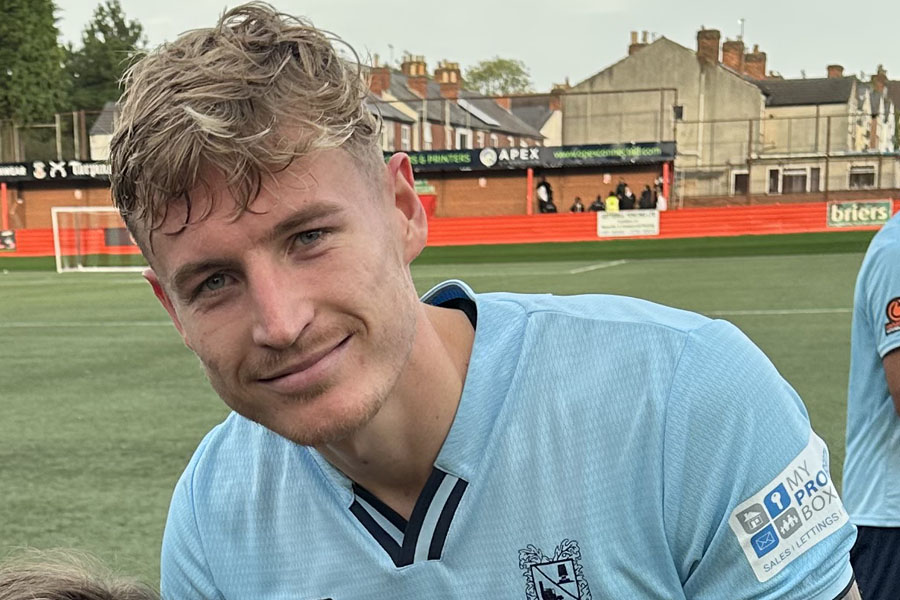
- Salkeld in October 2023

Personal information
- Full name: Cameron John Salkeld
- Date of birth: 6 December 1998 (age 27)
- Place of birth: Gateshead, England
- Height: 6 ft 1 in (1.85 m)
- Position: Midfielder

Team information
- Current team: Spennymoor Town
- Number: 24

Youth career
- 2009-2015: Newcastle United
- 2015-2018: Carlisle United

Senior career*
Years	Team	Apps	(Gls)
2015–2018	Carlisle United	0	(0)
2017–2018	→ Whitby Town (loan)		
2018	→ Annan Athletic (loan)	6	(0)
2018–2019	Gateshead	29	(1)
2019–2021	Greenock Morton	32	(2)
2021–2022	Ayr United	15	(1)
2023	Clyde	13	(4)
2023–2025	Darlington	65	(9)
2025-	Spennymoor Town	42	(2)
- * Club domestic league appearances and goals as of 21:05, 29 May 2025 (UTC)

Cameron John Salkeld (born 6 December 1998) is an English professional footballer who plays as a midfielder for National League North club Spennymoor Town FC.

He began his football career as a youngster with Carlisle United, and made his senior debut in 2016 in the EFL Trophy. After loan spells with Whitby Town and Annan Athletic, he spent the 2018–19 season with Gateshead before joining Scottish Championship club Greenock Morton. Two years later he signed for divisional rivals Ayr United, but an ACL injury was to keep him out of football for more than a year. He made a comeback with Clyde, and returned to English football with Darlington in 2023. In May 2025, Salkeld signed for Spennymoor Town FC from Darlington for the 2025/26 season.

== Playing career ==
Salkeld was on the books of Newcastle United as a youngster, but was released before reaching scholarship age. He trained with Carlisle United's youth team and was one of five offered a scholarship with that club in February 2015. Interviewed ahead of the 2016–17 season, he said his strengths were pace, dribbling and creating chances, and most wanted to improve his heading and positional sense.

Salkeld made his first-team debut for Carlisle United under Keith Curle on 4 October 2016, coming on as a 78th-minute substitute for Charlie Wyke in a 2–0 victory over Blackburn Rovers U23 in an EFL Trophy match at Brunton Park, and won a penalty after being fouled by Wes Brown. On 9 November, he scored his first senior goal in a 4–2 win over Fleetwood Town, also in the EFL Trophy. He signed a development contract in May 2017 after completing his scholarship.

On 23 November 2017, he joined Northern Premier League Premier Division club Whitby Town on a one-month loan as a replacement for the injured John Campbell. The loan was extended for a second month, after which he went on loan to Scottish League Two club Annan Athletic until the end of the season.

Salkeld was released by Carlisle at the end of the 2017–18 season, and joined Gateshead on a one-year contract in the summer of 2018. Like the majority of Gateshead's players and staff, Salkeld did not have his contract renewed at the end of the season due to financial issues.

On 6 June 2019, Salkeld signed for Scottish Championship club Greenock Morton on a one-year contract. He spent two seasons with the club, helping them avoid relegation in 2021, before joining another Championship club, Ayr United, under the management of David Hopkin who had signed him for Morton. He suffered an ACL injury in the middle of the 2021–22 season that was to keep him out for more than a year.

Salkeld signed for Scottish League One club Clyde on 21 January 2023 until the end of the season.

Salkeld returned to English football with National League North club Darlington for the 2023–24 season. He was a regular in the matchday squad, mainly as a starter, scored nine goals, of which seven came in the last few weeks of the season to help Darlington out of the relegation places, and won the supporters' Player of the Season award.

== Style of play ==
Salkeld's 2017 Carlisle United profile describes him as a "powerful, forward thinking" midfielder.

== Career statistics ==
As of end of 2024–25 season

Appearances and goals by club, season and competition
Club	Season	League			FA Cup		League Cup		Other		Total	
Club	Season	Division	Apps	Goals	Apps	Goals	Apps	Goals	Apps	Goals	Apps	Goals
Carlisle United	2016–17	League Two	0	0	0	0	0	0	2 (Note: Appearances in the EFL Trophy)	1	2	1
Carlisle United	2017–18	League Two	0	0	0	0	0	0	0	0	0	0
Carlisle United	Total		0	0	0	0	0	0	2	1	2	1
Annan Athletic (loan)	2017–18	Scottish League Two	6	0	0	0	0	0	0	0	6	0
Gateshead	2018–19	National League	29	1	0	0	0	0	0	0	29	1
Greenock Morton	2019–20	Scottish Championship	13	1	2	0	5	0	1 (Note: Appearance in the Scottish Challenge Cup)	0	21	1
Greenock Morton	2020–21	Scottish Championship	19	1	0	0	4	0	3 (Note: Appearances in Scottish Championship play-offs)	1	26	2
Greenock Morton	Total		32	2	2	0	9	0	4	1	47	3
Ayr United	2021–22	Scottish Championship	15	1	1	0	4	1	1	0	21	2
Clyde	2022–23	Scottish League One	13	3	0	0	0	0	2 (Note: Appearances in Scottish League One play-offs)	0	15	3
Darlington	2023–24	National League North	40	9	2	0	0	0	1 (Note: Appearance in FA Trophy)	0	43	9
Darlington	2024–25	National League North	25	0	1	0	—		2	0	28	0
Darlington	Total		65	9	3	0	0	0	3	0	71	9
Career total (Note: Appearances for Whitby Town not known.)			160	16	6	0	13	1	12	2	191	18
