= Luca Colville =

English footballer

Personal information
- Full name: Luca Robert Colville
- Date of birth: 17 July 1999 (age 27)
- Position: Winger

Team information
- Current team: Scarborough Athletic

Youth career
- 2010–2018: Huddersfield Town

Senior career*
Years	Team	Apps	(Gls)
2018–2019	Bradford City	11	(1)
2019–2021	Greenock Morton	36	(3)
2021–	Scarborough Athletic	24	(9)
- * Club domestic league appearances and goals as of 18:01, 4 May 2022 (UTC)

Luca Robert Colville (born 17 July 1999) is an English professional footballer who plays for Scarborough Athletic, as a winger. He has previously played for Bradford City and Greenock Morton.

== Career ==
Colville joined Huddersfield Town at the under-11 age group, turning professional in February 2017. He trialled with Sheffield United and Nottingham Forest in 2018. After a trial with the club, Colville signed a one-year contract with Bradford City on 14 August 2018. He scored on his debut later that same day, in an EFL Cup game.

In May 2019, following Bradford City's relegation to League Two, he was one of 3 first-team players to be offered a new contract by the club. In July 2019, City manager Gary Bowyer revealed that Colville was still considering whether to accept the offer or not. At the start of the 2019–20 season Colville remained with the club on a weekly contract. He made his first appearance in the 2019–20 season on 13 August 2019, in the EFL Cup.

On 23 August 2019, Colville signed a two-year deal with Scottish Championship club Greenock Morton, transferring for an undisclosed fee.

He returned to England in October 2021, signing for Scarborough Athletic.

== Personal life ==
His brother Harry is also a footballer.

== Career statistics ==
As of 4 May 2022

Appearances and goals by club, season and competition
Club	Season	League			FA Cup		League Cup		Other		Total	
Club	Season	Division	Apps	Goals	Apps	Goals	Apps	Goals	Apps	Goals	Apps	Goals
Bradford City	2018–19	League One	11	1	2	1	1	1	0	0	14	3
Bradford City	2019–20	League Two	0	0	0	0	1	0	0	0	1	0
Bradford City	Total		11	1	2	1	2	1	0	0	15	3
Greenock Morton	2019–20	Scottish Championship	19	2	2	0	0	0	1 (Note: Appearance in the Scottish Challenge Cup.)	0	22	2
Greenock Morton	2020–21	Scottish Championship	17	1	0	0	3	0	2 (Note: Appearances in the play-offs.)	0	22	1
Greenock Morton	Total		36	3	2	0	3	0	1	0	44	3
Scarborough Athletic	2021–22	Northern Premier League	24	9	0	0	0	0	5 (Note: Three appearances and two goals in the North Riding Senior Cup; two appearances and one goal in the play-offs.)	3	29	12
Career total			71	13	4	1	5	1	8	3	88	19
