= Markus Fjørtoft =

Norwegian footballer (born 1994)

Personal information
- Full name: Markus Garborg Fjørtoft
- Date of birth: 12 January 1994 (age 32)
- Place of birth: Swindon, England
- Height: 1.94 m (6 ft 4 in)
- Position: Defender

Youth career
- –2013: Bærum SK

College career
Years	Team	Apps	(Gls)
2014–2017	Duke Blue Devils	74	(7)

Senior career*
Years	Team	Apps	(Gls)
2013	Bærum SK	1	(0)
2017	New York Red Bulls U-23	13	(0)
2018–2019	Southern United	14	(0)
2019–2020	Hamilton Academical	9	(0)
2020–2021	Greenock Morton	23	(3)
2021–2022	Ayr United	25	(2)
Total		85	(5)
- * Club domestic league appearances and goals as of 23:20, 10 December 2021 (UTC)

Markus Garborg Fjørtoft (born 12 January 1994) is a former professional footballer who played as a defender in various countries, including Norway, the USA, New Zealand, and Scotland. Starting his career at the local club, Bærum SK, he later secured a scholarship to Duke University, where he obtained both his bachelor's and master's degrees. His college journey eventually led to his selection by Seattle Sounders FC in the 2018 MLS Draft. He retired on 10 August 2022, after leaving Ayr United to pursue new opportunities.

He is the son of former Norwegian international Jan Åge Fjørtoft.

Markus is actively involved in various ventures. During his football career, Fjørtoft co-hosted the podcast BroPod, along with fellow footballer Ciaran McKenna. The podcast centered around conversations with individuals from the realms of sports, media, finance, and politics. Guests included world-renowned journalists, broadcasters, club owners, agents, CEOs, and Ballon d'Or winners. He also worked as a marketing and fan engagement consultant. He currently works at the PFA, co-hosts The German Fussball Podcast with Jan Åge Fjørtoft, and runs his own Sports & Entertainment company, TwentyOne.

== Career ==
=== Youth and college ===
Fjørtoft progressed through the ranks at Bærum SK, being part of the talented '94 generation alongside players like Marius Lundemo, Daniel Granli, Simen Juklerød, Chris Wingate, and Borger Thomas. After making his official debut during Bærum SK's promotion season in 2013, he secured a soccer scholarship at Duke University.

Fjørtoft played four years of college soccer at Duke University between 2014 and 2017. He made a total of 74 appearances, scoring 7 and tallying 2 assists in his time at Duke. His achievements include being named to the All-ACC Freshman Team (2014), earning Team Rookie of the Year (2014) and Team Defensive MVP titles in consecutive years (2015 & 2016). He further established his standing by receiving Team MVP in 2017 and regional accolades such as All-ACC 3rd Team (2017) and All-South 2nd Team (2017).

In the 2017 season, Fjørtoft assumed the role of captain, leading Duke to a respectable 13-4-3 record. However, despite their success, the team faced a challenging defeat on penalties in the Sweet 16 of the NCAA Division I men's soccer tournament.

=== Professional ===
On 19 January 2018, Fjørtoft was selected in the second round (45th overall) in the 2018 MLS SuperDraft by Seattle Sounders FC.

In September 2018, Fjørtoft signed with Southern United FC of New Zealand in the ISPS Handa Premiership. He signed a one-year contract for Scottish club Hamilton Academical in the Scottish Premiership in April 2019, starting from July 2019. He extended his contract for another year in January 2020.

In September 2020, Fjørtoft was signed by David Hopkin and joined Scottish Championship side Greenock Morton on a permanent deal. After a tumultuous season that saw three different managers at the helm, Morton secured their position in the Scottish Championship through the relegation playoffs. Fjortoft concluded the season with three goals, notably scoring a 121st-minute equalizer against Motherwell in the Scottish Cup.

On 27 May 2021, it was announced that he had joined Ayr United for the 2021–22 season, marking the second time he was signed by David Hopkin. He left Ayr United at the end of the season, after the team secured their spot in the Scottish Championship on the last day of the season. On 10 August 2022, Fjørtoft announced his retirement from professional football at the age of 28.

== Post-playing career ==
Fjørtoft leads PFA's strategic content initiatives.

He also hosts "The German Fussball Podcast" and the "PFA Conversations" podcast. Interviews include Cesc Fabregas, Granit Xhaka, Erling Haaland, Ruud van Nistelrooy, John Terry, Jack Wilshere, David Dein, Gary Pallister, Les Ferdinand, Leah Williamson, and Vivianne Miedema.

He serves as a commentator and pundit for both English and Scottish football, contributing to renowned platforms such as BBC Scotland and BBC Wiltshire.

Fjortoft participated as a contestant on "Familiens Ære," a sports game show aired on NRK. Alongside his father, he engaged in a competition that challenged six renowned sports families, evaluating their physical and mental prowess while putting their relationships to the test.
