= Aidan Nesbitt =

Scottish footballer (born 1997)

Personal information
- Full name: Aidan Robert Nesbitt
- Date of birth: 5 February 1997 (age 29)
- Place of birth: Paisley, Scotland
- Height: 5 ft 9 in (1.74 m)
- Position: Attacking midfielder

Team information
- Current team: Arbroath (on loan from Falkirk)
- Number: 19

Youth career
- 2014–2015: Celtic

Senior career*
Years	Team	Apps	(Gls)
2015–2017	Celtic	1	(0)
2016	→ Partick Thistle (loan)	7	(0)
2016–2017	→ Greenock Morton (loan)	30	(3)
2017–2019	Milton Keynes Dons	19	(2)
2019	Dundee United	7	(0)
2019–2021	Greenock Morton	42	(7)
2021–	Falkirk	138	(19)
2026–	→ Arbroath (loan)	2	(0)

International career^{‡}
2013–2014	Scotland U17	10	(1)
2015–2016	Scotland U19	6	(2)
2016	Scotland U21	2	(0)
2017	Scotland U20	5	(0)
- * Club domestic league appearances and goals as of 12 March 2026 ‡ National team caps and goals as of 01:08, 1 September 2017 (UTC)

Aidan Robert Nesbitt (born 5 February 1997) is a Scottish professional footballer who plays as a midfielder for Scottish Championship club Arbroath on loan from Falkirk.

He has previously played for Partick Thistle, Dundee United, Milton Keynes Dons and Greenock Morton, after progressing through the Celtic youth academy.

== Club career ==
=== Celtic ===
Nesbitt is a product of the academy system at Celtic. On 21 May 2015, Nesbitt scored a hat-trick in the Scottish Youth Cup final against Rangers. On 23 September 2015, Nesbitt made his first team debut in a League Cup match against Raith Rovers when he came on in the 89th minute. On 24 April 2016, he won the Celtic academy player of the year award.

On 1 February 2016, Nesbitt joined fellow Scottish Premiership side Partick Thistle on loan until the end of the 2015–16 season. Nesbitt made his Premiership debut for Partick Thistle, starting in a 2–0 home win against St Johnstone on 23 February 2016; getting awarded a man of the match for his performance. He signed on loan with Greenock Morton in August 2016. The loan was extended in January 2017 until the end of the season.

=== Milton Keynes Dons ===
On 31 August 2017, Nesbitt joined League One club Milton Keynes Dons for an undisclosed fee, signing a two-year deal. Having made intermittent appearances under manager Robbie Neilson, Nesbitt soon found himself out of favour under new manager Paul Tisdale during the 2018–19 season. Nesbitt left the club by mutual consent on 2 January 2019, having made a total of 27 appearances in all competitions and scoring 4 goals.

=== Dundee United ===
On 4 January 2019, Nesbitt joined Scottish Championship club Dundee United on a short term deal, reuniting with his former manager at his previous club, Robbie Neilson. Nesbitt was released by United on 6 May 2019.

=== Greenock Morton ===
On 17 June 2019, Nesbitt signed for Greenock Morton on a one-year contract.

=== Falkirk ===
Following the end of his contract with Morton, Nesbitt signed a two year deal with then Scottish League One club Falkirk on 4 June 2021. Aidan was an integral part of the League One Invincible squad in 2023-24 and Falkirk's Championship winning 2024-25 season, signing a contract extension in October 2024 that keeps him at the club until 2027.

== International career ==
Nesbitt was named in the team of the tournament at the 2014 UEFA European Under-17 Football Championship, as Scotland U17s reached the semi-finals. He then appeared for the Scotland U19 team in each of the following two seasons. Whilst on loan to Morton, Nesbitt received his first call-up to the Scotland U21 squad in September 2016.

He was selected for the under-20 squad in the 2017 Toulon Tournament. After a historic first ever win against Brazil, which was at any level. Nesbitt played in the win over Czech Republic for the bronze medal. It was the nations first ever medal at the competition.

== Career statistics ==
As of 30 December 2025

Club	Season	League			FA Cup		League Cup		Other		Total	
Club	Season	Division	Apps	Goals	Apps	Goals	Apps	Goals	Apps	Goals	Apps	Goals
Celtic	2015–16	Scottish Premiership	0	0	0	0	1	0	0	0	1	0
Celtic	2016–17	Scottish Premiership	0	0	0	0	0	0	0	0	0	0
Celtic	2017–18	Scottish Premiership	0	0	0	0	0	0	0	0	0	0
Celtic	Total		0	0	0	0	1	0	0	0	1	0
Celtic Under-20s (Note: Matches in the Scottish Challenge Cup, in which teams from the SPFL Development League compete against senior clubs.)	2016–17	—							3	2	3	2
Celtic Under-20s	2017–18	—							1	0	1	0
Celtic Under-20s	Total		0	0	0	0	0	0	4	2	4	2
Partick Thistle (loan)	2015–16	Scottish Premiership	7	0	0	0	0	0	0	0	7	0
Greenock Morton (loan)	2016–17	Scottish Championship	30	1	3	0	3	0	1 (Note: Appearance in Scottish Premiership play-offs.)	0	37	1
Milton Keynes Dons	2017–18	League One	19	2	3	2	0	0	3 (Note: Appearances in the EFL Trophy)	0	25	4
Milton Keynes Dons	2018–19	League Two	0	0	0	0	0	0	2	0	2	0
Milton Keynes Dons	Total		19	2	3	2	0	0	5	0	27	4
Dundee United	2018–19	Scottish Championship	7	0	1	0	0	0	0	0	8	0
Greenock Morton	2019–20	Scottish Championship	20	3	2	0	5	2	0	0	27	5
Greenock Morton	2020–21	Scottish Championship	25	4	3	0	3	1	4 (Note: Appearances in Scottish Championship play-offs.)	0	35	5
Greenock Morton	Total		45	7	5	0	8	3	4	0	62	10
Falkirk	2021–22	Scottish League One	34	2	2	1	1	0	2 (Note: Appearances in Scottish Challenge Cup.)	1	39	4
Falkirk	2022–23	Scottish League One	36	3	5	1	4	1	4 (Note: Two Appearances in Scottish Challenge Cup and two appearances in Scottish Championship Play-offs.)	0	49	5
Falkirk	2023–24	Scottish League One	34	12	2	0	0	0	3	0	39	12
Falkirk	2024–25	Scottish Championship	31	2	2	0	3	2	0	0	36	4
Falkirk	2025–26	Scottish Premiership	3	0	0	0	5	0	0	0	8	0
Falkirk	Total		138	19	11	2	13	3	9	1	171	25
Career total			253	29	23	4	25	6	23	3	324	42

== Honours ==
Celtic U20

- Scottish Youth Cup: 2014–15

Falkirk

- Scottish League One: 2023-24
- Scottish Championship: 2024-25

Scotland U20

- Toulon Tournament Bronze: 2017

Individual

- UEFA European Under-17 Championship Team of the Tournament: 2014
- PFA Scotland Team of the Year: 2023–24 Scottish League One
