= Junior International Quadrangular Tournament =

- Umbro Trophy
- Founded: 1994
- Region: Europe (UEFA)
- Teams: 4
- Current champions: Northern Ireland (2017)
- Most championships: Scotland (6 titles)

The Junior International Quadrangular Tournament (most recently known as the Umbro Trophy for sponsorship reasons) was a football tournament held on an irregular basis between junior representative teams from Northern Ireland, the Republic of Ireland and Scotland and the Isle of Man national team. 'Junior' status does not refer to age, but to the status of the competing players, i.e. not senior. First held as the Guinness Cup in 1994, Guinness continued to sponsor the tournament until 2000. Statoil then acted as sponsors for three editions from 2001 until 2005. In 2008 Umbro became sponsors. Scotland are the tournament's most successful side having won six of the twelve editions.

The tournament was last held in 2017.

== Format ==
Each tournament is rotated around the competing teams who take it in turn to act as hosts. Initially the competition was held on a knock-out basis with two semi-finals followed by a third-place play-off and final. Since 2001 it has been held on a round-robin league basis, with each team facing each other once and three points being awarded for a win and one for a draw.

== Event History ==
=== Republic of Ireland 1994 ===
Final

Scotland	1–0	Republic of Ireland
own goal

- Northern Ireland were represented by a Mid Ulster Select.

=== Scotland 1995 ===
Final

1 April 1995

Northern Ireland	3-2	Scotland
Barnes (2), Johnston

Newlandsfield Park, Glasgow

=== Isle of Man 1996 ===
Final78

20 April 1996
15:00

Northern Ireland	2-1	Isle of Man
Morgan, Johnston

The Bowl, Douglas

=== Northern Ireland 1997 ===
Final

19 April 1997
15:00

Scotland	2-1	Northern Ireland
Billy Spence 84, 90		Smith 89

Lakeview Park, Loughgall

=== Republic of Ireland 1998 ===
Final

18 April 1998
15:00

Republic of Ireland	2-0	Isle of Man
Cummins, Roche

MacSharry Park, Sligo

=== Scotland 1999 ===
Final

17 April 1999
15:00

Republic of Ireland	1–1 (4-2 pens)	Scotland

Newlandsfield Park, Glasgow

=== Isle of Man 2000 ===
Final

15 April 2000

Isle of Man	2–0	Scotland

=== Northern Ireland 2001 ===
Team	Pts	Pld	W	D	L	GF	GA	GD
Republic of Ireland	7	3	2	1	0	5	1	+4
Scotland	6	3	2	0	1	5	3	+2
Northern Ireland	3	3	1	0	2	2	5	−3
Isle of Man	1	3	0	1	2	1	4	−3

=== Republic of Ireland 2003 ===
Team	Pts	Pld	W	D	L	GF	GA	GD
Scotland	5	3	1	2	0	6	4	+2
Isle of Man	5	3	1	2	0	5	4	+1
Republic of Ireland	4	3	1	1	1	5	2	+3
Northern Ireland	1	3	0	1	2	3	9	−6

=== Scotland 2005 ===
Team	Pts	Pld	W	D	L	GF	GA	GD
Scotland	6	3	2	0	1	4	1	+3
Republic of Ireland	6	3	2	0	1	4	1	+3
Northern Ireland	3	3	1	1	1	3	4	−1
Isle of Man	1	3	0	1	2	2	7	−5

- Scotland finish ahead of the Republic of Ireland on head-to-head record.

=== Isle of Man 2008 ===
Team	Pts	Pld	W	D	L	GF	GA	GD
Scotland	7	3	2	1	0	8	6	+2
Republic of Ireland	5	3	1	2	0	4	2	+2
Northern Ireland	3	3	0	2	1	6	7	−1
Isle of Man	1	3	0	1	0	4	7	−3

=== Northern Ireland 2010 ===
Team	Pts	Pld	W	D	L	GF	GA	GD
Scotland	7	3	2	1	0	6	3	+2
Republic of Ireland	4	3	1	1	1	3	3	0
Isle of Man	2	3	0	2	1	3	4	−1
Northern Ireland	2	3	0	2	1	2	4	−2

=== Republic of Ireland 2013 ===
The 2013 Umbro Quadrangular Trophy took place in Limerick from 3–5 October 2013.

Team	Pts	Pld	W	D	L	GF	GA	GD
Republic of Ireland	9	3	3	0	0	9	0	+9
Scotland	6	3	2	0	1	10	4	+6
Northern Ireland	3	3	1	0	2	3	6	-3
Isle of Man	0	3	0	0	3	1	13	-12

3 October 2013
15:00

Scotland	0–3	Republic of Ireland
	Report	Walsh (2 pens), Dunne

Pike Rovers Complex, Limerick
3 October 2013
19:00

Isle of Man	1–2	Northern Ireland
McNulty (pen)	Report	Curtis, Chines

Jackman Park, Limerick

4 October 2013
13:00

Republic of Ireland	5–0	Isle of Man

Janesboro, Limerick
4 October 2013
15:00

Northern Ireland	1-4	Scotland
Donnelly (og)	Report	Campbell (2), Barr (pen), Donnelly

Fairgreen, Limerick

5 October 2013
15:00

Scotland	6–0	Isle of Man
Leiper, Barr (2, 1 pen.), Hislop (3)	Report

Pike Rovers Complex, Limerick
5 October 2013
15:00

Northern Ireland	0–1	Republic of Ireland
	Report	Breen

Fairgreen, Limerick

=== Scotland 2017 ===
The 2017 Umbro Quadrangular Trophy took place in Glasgow from 11 to 14 October 2017.

Team	Pts	Pld	W	D	L	GF	GA	GD
Northern Ireland	7	3	2	1	0	8	3	+5
Scotland	7	3	2	1	0	5	3	+2
Republic of Ireland	3	3	1	0	2	4	5	-1
Isle of Man	0	3	0	0	3	3	9	-1

11 October 2017
14:30

Republic of Ireland	3–2	Isle of Man
Clarke, Hayes, Donnelly	Report	Thomas, Boyle

Somervell Park, Cambuslang
Referee: Lloyd Wilson (Scotland)
11 October 2017
14:30

Northern Ireland	2–2	Scotland
Campbell (2)	Report	Wilson, McCann

McKenna Park, Glasgow
Referee: Andrew Lodge (Isle of Man)

12 October 2017
19:00

Isle of Man	0–4	Northern Ireland
	Report	Thompson, Gray, Wilson, Kelly

New Tinto Park, Glasgow
Referee: David Dickinson (Scotland)
12 October 2017
19:00

Scotland	1–0	Republic of Ireland
Brash	Report

New Western Park, Renfrew
Referee: Mark Dillon (Northern Ireland)

14 October 2017
14:30

Republic of Ireland	1–2	Northern Ireland
Clarke		Mullen, Campbell

McKenna Park, Glasgow
Referee: Graham Grainger (Scotland)
14 October 2017
14:30

Isle of Man	1–2	Scotland
Quaye		Hoskins, Wilson

Newlandsfield Park, Glasgow
Referee: Declan Troy (Republic of Ireland)

== Summary of winners ==
Team	Winners	Runners-up	Winning years
Scotland	6	6	1994, 1997, 2003, 2005, 2008, 2010
Republic of Ireland	4	4	1998, 1999, 2001, 2013
Northern Ireland	3	1	1995, 1996, 2017
Isle of Man	1	3	2000
