= Jack Baird =

Scottish footballer

Personal information
- Date of birth: 7 February 1996 (age 30)
- Place of birth: Glasgow, Scotland
- Position: Defender

Team information
- Current team: Raith Rovers
- Number: 6

Senior career*
| Years | Team | Apps | (Gls) |
| 2014–2020 | St Mirren | 128 | (2) |
| 2019–2020 | → Greenock Morton (loan) | 24 | (3) |
| 2020–2022 | Ayr United | 54 | (2) |
| 2022–2025 | Greenock Morton | 100 | (12) |
| 2025–2026 | St Johnstone | 27 | (3) |
| 2026– | Raith Rovers | 12 | (0) |
- * Club domestic league appearances and goals as of 14 November 2026

Jack Baird (born 7 February 1996) is a Scottish professional footballer who plays as a defender for Scottish Championship club Raith Rovers. He has previously played for St Mirren, Greenock Morton (two spells), Ayr United and St Johnstone, with whom he won the Scottish Championship in 2025–26.

== Career ==
Baird made his first team debut for St Mirren on 22 November 2014, in a 3–0 defeat to Hamilton Academical. On 14 May 2015, Baird signed a two-year extension to his contract, tying him to the club until the summer of 2017.

After establishing himself as a first team regular, Baird signed a new one-year deal in May 2017. Baird signed a further one-year extension to his contract in January 2018, tying him to the club until the summer of 2019 after showing impressive form.

In January 2019, Baird signed a further two-year contract extension, keeping him at the club until the summer of 2021.

He moved on loan to Greenock Morton in September 2019. The loan agreement was originally due to expire in January 2020, but it was later extended to the end of the 2019–20 season.

On 3 September 2020 Baird left St Mirren by mutual consent. The next day he signed for Ayr United. He made 67 appearances in all competitions over two seasons in the Scottish Championship, scoring twice.

In May 2022, Baird signed a pre-contract agreement with fellow Scottish Championship side Greenock Morton. He played 119 times in three seasons at the club, scoring 13 goals, seven of them in his first season.

On 26 May 2025 Baird signed a two-year contract with St Johnstone. He made 34 appearances and scored three goals in 2025–26 as the club won the Scottish Championship and secured an immediate return to the Scottish Premiership. He added three appearances early in 2026–27 before leaving the club.

In August 2026, Baird signed for Scottish Championship club Raith Rovers on a two-year contract.

== Career statistics ==
As of match played 14 November 2026

Appearances and goals by club, season and competition
| Club | Season | League | | | Scottish Cup | | League Cup | | Other | | Total | |
| Club | Season | Division | Apps | Goals | Apps | Goals | Apps | Goals | Apps | Goals | Apps | Goals |
|---|---|---|---|---|---|---|---|---|---|---|---|---|
| St Mirren | 2014–15 | Scottish Premiership | 8 | 0 | 0 | 0 | 0 | 0 | 0 | 0 | 8 | 0 |
| St Mirren | 2015–16 | Scottish Championship | 31 | 1 | 1 | 0 | 1 | 0 | 4 (Note: Appearances in Scottish Challenge Cup) | 0 | 37 | 1 |
| St Mirren | 2016–17 | Scottish Championship | 25 | 0 | 3 | 1 | 4 | 2 | 4 | 0 | 36 | 3 |
| St Mirren | 2017–18 | Scottish Championship | 31 | 1 | 2 | 1 | 2 | 0 | 3 | 0 | 38 | 2 |
| St Mirren | 2018–19 | Scottish Premiership | 33 | 0 | 2 | 0 | 5 | 0 | 2 (Note: Appearances in Scottish Premiership play-offs) | 0 | 42 | 0 |
| St Mirren | 2019–20 | Scottish Premiership | 0 | 0 | 0 | 0 | 4 | 0 | 0 | 0 | 4 | 0 |
| St Mirren | Total | | 128 | 2 | 8 | 2 | 16 | 2 | 13 | 0 | 165 | 6 |
| Greenock Morton (loan) | 2019–20 | Scottish Championship | 24 | 3 | 1 | 0 | 0 | 0 | 1 | 0 | 26 | 3 |
| Ayr United | 2020–21 | Scottish Championship | 27 | 1 | 2 | 0 | 5 | 0 | 0 | 0 | 34 | 1 |
| Ayr United | 2021–22 | Scottish Championship | 27 | 1 | 2 | 0 | 4 | 0 | 0 | 0 | 33 | 1 |
| Ayr United | Total | | 54 | 2 | 4 | 0 | 9 | 0 | 0 | 0 | 67 | 2 |
| Greenock Morton | 2022–23 | Scottish Championship | 35 | 7 | 2 | 0 | 3 | 0 | 1 | 0 | 41 | 7 |
| Greenock Morton | 2023–24 | Scottish Championship | 30 | 3 | 3 | 0 | 2 | 1 | 3 | 0 | 38 | 4 |
| Greenock Morton | 2024–25 | Scottish Championship | 35 | 2 | 1 | 0 | 2 | 0 | 2 | 0 | 40 | 2 |
| Greenock Morton | Total | | 100 | 12 | 6 | 0 | 7 | 1 | 6 | 0 | 119 | 13 |
| St Johnstone | 2025–26 | Scottish Championship | 26 | 3 | 1 | 0 | 4 | 0 | 3 | 0 | 34 | 3 |
| St Johnstone | 2026–27 | Scottish Premiership | 1 | 0 | 0 | 0 | 2 | 0 | 0 | 0 | 3 | 0 |
| St Johnstone | Total | | 27 | 3 | 1 | 0 | 6 | 0 | 3 | 0 | 37 | 3 |
| Raith Rovers | 2026–27 | Scottish Championship | 12 | 0 | 0 | 0 | 0 | 0 | 0 | 0 | 12 | 0 |
| Career total | | | 345 | 22 | 20 | 2 | 38 | 3 | 23 | 0 | 426 | 27 |

== Honours ==
St Johnstone

- Scottish Championship: 2025–26
