= Cameron Blues =

Scottish footballer

Personal information
- Date of birth: 13 April 1998 (age 28)
- Position: Midfielder

Team information
- Current team: Hamilton Academical
- Number: 6

Youth career
- Falkirk

Senior career*
Years	Team	Apps	(Gls)
2016–2018	Falkirk	6	(0)
2018	→ Edinburgh City (loan)	16	(1)
2018–2019	Livingston	0	(0)
2018–2019	→ Brechin City (loan)	7	(1)
2019	→ Berwick Rangers (loan)	13	(2)
2019	→ Greenock Morton (loan)	3	(0)
2019–2026	Greenock Morton	188	(17)
2026–	Hamilton Academical	15	(3)
- * Club domestic league appearances and goals as of 22:04, 14 November 2026 (UTC)

Cameron Blues (born 13 April 1998) is a Scottish professional footballer who plays as a midfielder for Hamilton Academical.

Blues has played for Falkirk, Edinburgh City, Livingston, Brechin City, Berwick Rangers and Greenock Morton.

== Career ==
Blues began his career with Falkirk, spending time on loan at Edinburgh City before signing for Livingston on a two-year contract in June 2018. He moved on loan to Brechin City in September 2018, to Berwick Rangers in February 2019, and to Greenock Morton in July 2019. After making five appearances for the club in all competitions, the deal was made permanent on 6 September 2019, with Blues signing a contract until the end of the season.

Blues scored his first-ever goal for the club as they defeated Queens Park in the Scottish League Cup group stage on 13 October 2020. Blues made his 100th appearance for the club on 7 March 2023 in a 1–3 defeat against Ayr United.

In June 2026 he signed a two-year contract with Hamilton Academical.

== Career statistics ==
As of 17 April 2021

Appearances and goals by club, season and competition
Club	Season	League			National Cup		League Cup		Other		Total	
Club	Season	Division	Apps	Goals	Apps	Goals	Apps	Goals	Apps	Goals	Apps	Goals
Falkirk	2016–17	Scottish Championship	0	0	0	0	0	0	1 (Note: Appearances in the Scottish Challenge Cup)	0	1	0
Falkirk	2017–18	Scottish Championship	6	0	0	0	0	0	2	0	8	0
Falkirk	Total		6	0	0	0	0	0	3	0	9	0
Edinburgh City (loan)	2017–18	Scottish League Two	16	1	0	0	0	0	0	0	16	1
Livingston	2018–19	Scottish Premiership	0	0	0	0	0	0	0	0	0	0
Livingston	2019–20	Scottish Premiership	0	0	0	0	0	0	0	0	0	0
Livingston	Total		0	0	0	0	0	0	0	0	0	0
Brechin City (loan)	2018–19	Scottish League One	7	1	0	0	0	0	0	0	7	1
Berwick Rangers (loan)	2018–19	Scottish League Two	13	2	0	0	0	0	2 (Note: Appearances in the Scottish League Two play-offs)	0	15	2
Greenock Morton (loan)	2019–20	Scottish Championship	3	0	0	0	1	0	1	0	5	0
Greenock Morton	2019–20	Scottish Championship	10	0	0	0	0	0	0	0	10	0
Greenock Morton	2020–21	Scottish Championship	12	2	2	0	2	1	0	0	16	3
Greenock Morton	Total		22	2	2	0	2	1	0	0	26	3
Career total			64	6	2	0	2	1	8	0	76	7
