= Luke McCowan =

Scottish footballer

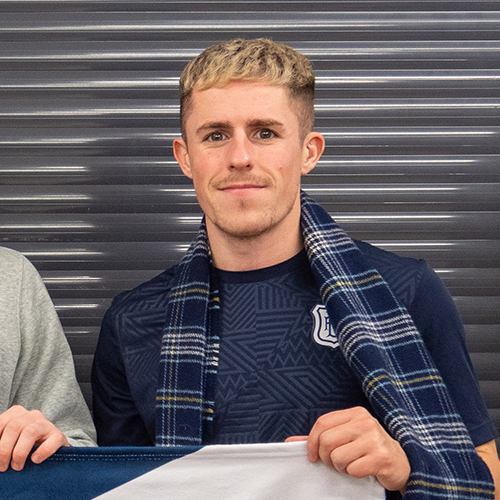
- McCowan in 2024

Personal information
- Date of birth: 9 December 1997 (age 28)
- Place of birth: Greenock, Scotland
- Height: 1.77 m (5 ft 10 in)
- Positions: Midfielder; left wing-back

Team information
- Current team: Celtic
- Number: 14

Youth career
- East End United F.C.
- 2015–2017: Ayr United

Senior career*
Years	Team	Apps	(Gls)
2017–2021	Ayr United	56	(10)
2015–2016	→ Lugar Boswell Thistle (loan)		
2016–2017	→ Annbank United (loan)		
2021–2024	Dundee	99	(23)
2024–	Celtic	66	(8)
- * Club domestic league appearances and goals as of 29 August 2026

Luke McCowan (born 9 December 1997) is a Scottish professional footballer who plays as a midfielder or left wing-back for Scottish Premiership club Celtic.

== Early life ==
McCowan was born in Greenock, Scotland and attended St. Laurence's Primary School and Notre Dame High School.

== Career ==
=== Youth career ===
In 2015, McCowan won the West of Scotland Title with East End United F.C. While at the Ayr United's youth teams, he had a busy day as he had to be up at 5am to work as a lifeguard at Waterfront Leisure Complex before attending gym sessions in the afternoon, then driving for over an hour to train with Ayr.

=== Ayr United ===
On 1 July 2017, McCowan signed his first professional contract for Ayr United lasting one year. In his first season, he made five appearances, scoring one goal in all competitions, with one appearance coming in the League. On 6 June 2019, it was announced that McCowan had been given a two-year contract after getting rave reviews from the game against Partick Thistle in late April.

=== Dundee ===
On 1 June 2021, McCowan signed a two-year deal with Scottish Premiership side Dundee. He made his debut for the club in the Scottish League Cup against Brora Rangers. McCowan got his first competitive goal for the Dee the following week against Montrose. He later scored his first Premiership goal which clinched a win over Aberdeen.

In December 2022, McCowan scored a brace away against his former club Ayr United to help Dundee win and put them top of the Scottish Championship for Christmas. He concluded a strong season with an excellent performance and goal against Queen's Park to help Dundee clinch the Scottish Championship title.

On 4 June 2023, Dundee announced that McCowan had signed a new two-year deal, keeping him at the club until the summer of 2025. McCowan marked his 100th appearance for the Dark Blues with an eventful performance, scoring a goal and receiving a red card in a comfortable away win over Livingston. Near the end of a successful season which saw Dundee reach top six and McCowan switch from the wing to centre midfielder with ease and captaining the squad following an injury to Joe Shaughnessy, McCowan was awarded as the Scottish Premiership Player of the Month for April 2024. At the end of the season, McCowan was named Dundee's Player of the Year and Players' Player of the Year.

=== Celtic ===
On 30 August 2024, McCowan signed for Scottish champions Celtic on a three-year deal, for a reported fee of around £1 million. He made his Celtic debut on 1 September, coming on as a substitute in an Old Firm win over Rangers. He opened his scoring account for his boyhood club in his next game, netting at home in a win against Hearts. On 23 October, McCowan made his UEFA Champions League debut off the bench in a draw in Italy away to Atalanta. He won the Scottish Premiership title with Celtic at Tannadice Park in April 2025.

On 3 August 2025, McCowan scored Celtic's first competitive goal of the 2025–26 season, in a 1–0 win against St Mirren. He also scored the Bhoys' fourth goal in their 6–2 win against the same opponent in the Scottish Cup semi-final on 19 April 2026. Five days later, he extended his contract at Celtic Park until 2028.

== Style of play ==
McCowan is left footed and right handed. A versatile player, he often plays across all sides of the midfield and even sometimes plays as a winger.

== Career statistics ==
As of match played 29 August 2026

Appearances and goals by club, season and competition
Club	Season	League			Scottish Cup		League Cup		Europe		Other		Total	
Club	Season	Division	Apps	Goals	Apps	Goals	Apps	Goals	Apps	Goals	Apps	Goals	Apps	Goals
Ayr United	2017–18	Scottish League One	1	0	1	0	1	0	—		2 (Note: Appearances in Scottish Challenge Cup)	1	5	1
Ayr United	2018–19	Scottish Championship	5	0	1	0	0	0	—		3 (Note: One appearance in Scottish Challenge Cup, two appearances and one goal in Scottish Premiership play-offs)	1	9	1
Ayr United	2019–20	Scottish Championship	24	5	2	0	4	3	—		1	0	31	8
Ayr United	2020–21	Scottish Championship	26	5	2	2	5	2	—		—		33	9
Ayr United	Total		56	10	6	2	10	5	0	0	6	2	78	19
Dundee	2021–22	Scottish Premiership	29	4	3	0	4	1	—		—		36	5
Dundee	2022–23	Scottish Championship	30	7	2	1	5	1	—		3	1	40	10
Dundee	2023–24	Scottish Premiership	37	10	1	0	3	0	—		—		41	10
Dundee	2024–25	Scottish Premiership	3	2	—		5	1	—		—		8	3
Dundee	Total		99	23	6	1	17	3	0	0	3	1	125	28
Celtic	2024–25	Scottish Premiership	33	6	4	1	—		3 (Note: Appearance(s) in UEFA Champions League)	0	—		40	7
Celtic	2025–26	Scottish Premiership	30	1	4	1	3	1	5 (Note: One appearance in UEFA Champions League, four appearance in UEFA Europa League)	1	—		42	4
Celtic	2026–27	Scottish Premiership	3	1	0	0	1	0	1	0	—		5	1
Celtic	Total		66	8	8	2	4	1	9	1	0	0	87	12
Career total			221	41	20	5	31	9	10	1	9	3	290	59

== Honours ==
Dundee

- Scottish Championship: 2022–23

Celtic

- Scottish Premiership: 2024–25, 2025–26
- Scottish Cup: 2025–26

Individual

- Scottish Premiership Player of the Month: April 2024
- Andrew De Vries Player of the Year: 2023–24
- Dundee Players' Player of the Year: 2023–24
