= Andy Murdoch (footballer, born 1995) =

Scottish footballer

Personal information
- Full name: Andrew Murdoch
- Date of birth: 30 January 1995 (age 31)
- Place of birth: Paisley, Scotland
- Height: 5 ft 9 in (1.75 m)
- Position: Midfielder

Team information
- Current team: Clyde
- Number: 27

Youth career
- 2007: Everton B.C.
- 2007–2012: Rangers

Senior career*
Years	Team	Apps	(Gls)
2012–2016	Rangers	16	(1)
2015–2016	→ Cowdenbeath (loan)	13	(2)
2016	→ Queen of the South (loan)	10	(1)
2016–2018	Greenock Morton	62	(4)
2018–2025	Ayr United	121	(4)
2024–2025	→ Clyde (loan)	20	(0)
2025–	Clyde	46	(1)

International career^{‡}
2011	Scotland U16	1	(0)
- * Club domestic league appearances and goals as of 4 May 2026 ‡ National team caps and goals as of 1 June 2016

Andrew Murdoch (born 30 January 1995) is a Scottish footballer who plays as a midfielder for Scottish League Two club Clyde. Murdoch previously played for Rangers, Cowdenbeath, Queen of the South, Morton and Ayr United.

== Club career ==
=== Rangers ===
Murdoch joined Rangers from Paisley based Everton Boys Club after trials with Dundee United and Celtic.

In April 2013, he played and scored in a friendly match at Ibrox Stadium against Linfield. Just over two weeks later he made his competitive debut against East Stirlingshire as an 80th-minute substitute for Kyle Hutton on 27 April 2013.

Murdoch made only one appearance during the 2013–14 season, in a Scottish League One match against East Fife. Murdoch scored his first competitive goal on 20 February 2015 against Raith Rovers. A few days later he agreed a two-and-a-half-year extension with Rangers that was due to expire in May 2017. Murdoch become a first team regular in the 2014–15 season as Rangers aimed to gain promotion from the Scottish Championship, They finished a disappointing third behind Hearts and Hibernian but qualified for the Premiership Play Offs. Rangers beat Queen of the South and Hibernian to reach the final where they faced 11th placed Scottish Premiership club Motherwell. They were clearly defeated in a 6–1 aggregate loss and would have to remain in the Championship for another season. Murdoch played all the play-off games and for his performances over the season won the Rangers' Young Player of the Year award in May 2015.

The arrival of new manager Mark Warburton saw Murdoch's first-team opportunities limited. On 1 September 2015, he moved to Scottish League One side Cowdenbeath on a six-month loan deal until January 2016. He made fifteen appearances and scored two goals. On 11 January 2016, Murdoch signed on loan to fellow Championship team Queen of the South on another six-month loan deal until the end of the 2015–16 season. He made ten appearances and scored one goal. Murdoch scored the only goal in a 1–0 win for Queens against Hibernian, which helped to extend Rangers' lead in the 2015–16 Scottish Championship.

Murdoch was released by Rangers on 31 August 2016.

=== Greenock Morton ===
On 23 September 2016, Murdoch signed for Greenock Morton on a contract until 15 January 2017. In November this deal was extended until the end of the season.

After making over 30 starts for Morton in 2016-17, Murdoch signed for another year in May 2017. He made a total of 75 appearances across all competitions and scored 4 goals before he left the club at the end of his contract in 2018.

=== Ayr United ===
On 12 July 2018, Murdoch signed a one-year deal with Scottish Championship side Ayr United. He was part of a side that enjoyed a good Scottish League Cup run finishing top of their five team group with a 100% win record with twelve goals scored and only one conceded before defeating Scottish Premiership side Dundee 3-0 in the next round. They were then knocked out in the quarter-final against Murdoch's former club Rangers, losing 4–0. On 25 March 2019, Murdoch signed a new contract at Ayr for the 2019–20 season.

=== Clyde ===
On 3 August 2024, Murdoch moved on loan to Clyde in Scottish League Two until January 2025. After Murdoch departed Ayr in January, he signed a permanent deal with Clyde on 7 February 2025.

== International career ==
Murdoch represented Scotland once, at under-16 level, in a Victory Shield match against England in 2011.

== Career statistics ==
As of 17 May 2019

Club	Season	League			National Cup		League Cup		Other		Total	
Club	Season	Division	Apps	Goals	Apps	Goals	Apps	Goals	Apps	Goals	Apps	Goals
Rangers	2012–13	Scottish Third Division	1	0	0	0	0	0	0	0	1	0
Rangers	2013–14	Scottish League One	1	0	0	0	0	0	0	0	1	0
Rangers	2014–15	Scottish Championship	14	1	1	0	0	0	6 (Note: Appearances in the Scottish Premiership play-offs)	0	21	1
Rangers	2015–16	Scottish Championship	0	0	0	0	0	0	0	0	0	0
Rangers	Total		16	1	1	0	0	0	6	0	23	1
Cowdenbeath (loan)	2015–16	Scottish League One	13	2	2	0	0	0	0	0	15	2
Queen of the South (loan)	2015–16	Scottish Championship	10	1	0	0	0	0	0	0	10	1
Greenock Morton	2016–17	Scottish Championship	28	1	2	0	1	0	2	0	33	1
Greenock Morton	2017–18	Scottish Championship	34	3	3	0	4	0	1 (Note: Appearances in the Scottish Challenge Cup)	0	42	3
Greenock Morton	Total		62	4	5	0	5	0	3	0	75	4
Ayr United	2018–19	Scottish Championship	34	1	1	0	6	0	3 (Note: One appearance in the Scottish Challenge Cup; Two appearances in the Scottish Premiership play-offs)	0	44	1
Career total			135	9	9	0	11	0	12	0	167	9

== Honours ==
Rangers

- Scottish Youth Cup (1): 2013-14
