= Gary Oliver (footballer) =

Scottish footballer (born 1995)

Personal information
- Date of birth: 14 July 1995 (age 31)
- Place of birth: Glasgow, Scotland
- Height: 5 ft 10 in (1.78 m)
- Position: Forward

Team information
- Current team: Montrose
- Number: 19

Youth career
- –2013: Heart of Midlothian

Senior career*
Years	Team	Apps	(Gls)
2013–2015	Heart of Midlothian	18	(1)
2014	→ Stenhousemuir (loan)	11	(2)
2015–2016	Queen of the South	28	(8)
2016–2019	Greenock Morton	80	(13)
2019–2020	Queen of the South	20	(4)
2020–2022	Greenock Morton	55	(8)
2022–2026	Falkirk	103	(14)
2026–	Montrose	11	(5)

International career^{‡}
2013–2014	Scotland U19	4	(1)
- * Club domestic league appearances and goals as of 18 October 2026 ‡ National team caps and goals as of 10:28, 17 February 2021 (UTC)

Gary Oliver (born 14 July 1995) is a Scottish professional footballer who plays as a forward for Scottish League One side Montrose. Oliver started his career at Heart of Midlothian, before a loan spell at Stenhousemuir, followed by one season with Queen of the South, before spending three seasons with Greenock Morton. On 5 August 2020, after leaving the Doonhamers, Oliver returned to Ton, and spent two more seasons there. Oliver has also earned four caps for Scotland U19's.

== Club career ==
Oliver was born in Glasgow and joined Heart of Midlothian's youth academy in Edinburgh. Oliver's professional debut for Hearts was in a Scottish League Cup match against Raith Rovers on 27 August 2013, coming on as a substitute in the 55th minute, replacing midfielder Scott Robinson. Four days later Oliver made his league debut for the club, coming on as substitute for Callum Tapping in the 61st minute in a 2–0 defeat to Inverness Caledonian Thistle.

Under the management of Gary Locke, Oliver was one of the youngsters to get an opportunity in the first team, as a result of Hearts entering administration, as well as having an injury crisis at that particular time. Oliver ended his first season at the club with 8 league appearances, as Hearts were relegated to the Scottish Championship. His season, however, was overshadowed when he injured his ankle during a match against Inverness Caley Thistle and was sidelined for three weeks. Oliver signed a new one-year contract extension after Hearts ended their period of administration. On 23 August 2014 Oliver scored his first goal for Hearts in a 4–0 win over Raith Rovers, scoring in the 90th minute.

On 1 September 2014, Oliver joined Scottish League One club Stenhousemuir on loan until 5 January 2015. Oliver then played against the Ochilview Park club later that season during March 2015, after his loan spell had ended, scoring a goal as Hearts won 2–1. During his loan spell at Stenhousemuir, Oliver had scored two goals and set-up another goal in a 4–0 win over Stirling Albion on 19 October 2014. On 19 December 2014, Oliver's loan spell at Ochilview ended early, as he was recalled by Hearts after appearing in 11 league matches and scoring two goals.

After one season in Dumfries, Oliver signed for his uncle Jim Duffy's club Greenock Morton. After his two-year deal ended, Oliver signed a one-year contract extension with the Greenock club.

In November 2018, Oliver sustained a broken collarbone in a challenge with Peterhead's ex-Ton midfielder Jamie Stevenson, that kept him out of first-team action for two months.

On 10 June 2019, Oliver signed a two-year contract with Dumfries club Queen of the South, where he returns for a second spell.

On 5 August 2020, Oliver signed a one-year deal with Greenock Morton for his second spell with the club, having triggered a clause in his contract with Queens, after not playing enough matches for the club during the 2019–20 season to remain at Palmerston.

On 9 June 2022, Oliver was signed by Scottish League One side Falkirk on a one-year deal with the option of a further one-year extension. He scored his first goal for Falkirk in a 3–1 victory at home against Peterhead.

On 16 July 2026, Oliver signed a two-year contract with Scottish League One side Montrose.

== International career ==
During October 2013, Oliver was called up by Ricky Sbragia for the Scotland under-19 squad. Oliver made his Scotland U19 debut in a 1–1 draw against Germany under-19's and scored his first goal in a 4–2 win over Switzerland under-19's.

== Career statistics ==
As of 1 September 2026

Appearances and goals by club, season and competition
Club	Season	League			Scottish Cup		League Cup		Other		Total	
Club	Season	Division	Apps	Goals	Apps	Goals	Apps	Goals	Apps	Goals	Apps	Goals
Heart of Midlothian	2013–14	Scottish Premiership	8	0	0	0	2	0	0	0	10	0
Heart of Midlothian	2014–15	Scottish Championship	9	1	0	0	1	1	2 (Note: Appearances in the Scottish Challenge Cup)	0	12	2
Heart of Midlothian	2015–16	Scottish Premiership	1	0	0	0	2	0	0	0	3	0
Heart of Midlothian	Total		18	1	0	0	5	1	2	0	25	2
Stenhousemuir (loan)	2014–15	Scottish League One	11	2	0	0	0	0	0	0	11	2
Queen of the South	2015–16	Scottish Championship	28	6	1	0	0	0	0	0	29	6
Greenock Morton	2016–17	Scottish Championship	30	7	2	0	7	1	3 (Note: One appearance in the Scottish Challenge Cup and two in the Premiership play-offs)	0	42	8
Greenock Morton	2017–18	Scottish Championship	32	5	3	1	1	0	1	0	37	6
Greenock Morton	2018–19	Scottish Championship	18	1	2	0	4	0	1	1	25	2
Greenock Morton	Total		80	13	7	1	12	1	5	1	104	16
Queen of the South	2019–20	Scottish Championship	20	4	1	0	3	1	0	0	24	5
Greenock Morton	2020–21	Scottish Championship	20	2	2	0	2	0	4 (Note: Appearances in the Scottish Championship play-offs)	3	28	5
Greenock Morton	2021–22	Scottish Championship	35	6	3	0	3	0	3	0	44	6
Greenock Morton	Total		55	8	5	0	5	0	7	3	72	11
Falkirk	2022–23	Scottish League One	36	6	5	3	5	0	4	1	50	10
Falkirk	2023-24	Scottish League One	29	5	1	0	3	0	3	0	36	5
Falkirk	2024-25	Scottish Championship	33	3	2	0	6	0	1	0	42	3
Falkirk	2025-26	Scottish Premiership	5	0	0	0	3	0	0	0	8	0
Falkirk	Total		103	14	8	3	17	0	8	1	136	18
Montrose	2026-27	Scottish Leage One	5	5	0	0	3	0	2	1	10	6
Career total			320	53	22	4	45	3	24	6	411	66

== Personal life ==
Oliver was born in Glasgow and attended Cleveden Secondary School. Oliver is the nephew of his former Greenock Morton manager Jim Duffy.

== Honours ==
Falkirk

- Scottish League One: 2023-24
- Scottish Championship: 2024–25
