= 2017 Scottish Challenge Cup final =

- Official match day programme
- Event: 2016–17 Scottish Challenge Cup
Dundee United	St Mirren
2	1
- Date: 25 March 2017
- Venue: Fir Park, Motherwell
- Referee: Nick Walsh
- Attendance: 8,089
- Weather: Sunny

The 2017 Scottish Challenge Cup final, also known as the Irn-Bru Cup final for sponsorship reasons, is a football match that took place on 25 March 2017 at Fir Park, between Dundee United and St Mirren. It was the 26th final of the Scottish Challenge Cup since it was first organised in 1990 to celebrate the centenary of the now defunct Scottish Football League and the fourth since the Scottish Professional Football League was formed. Both teams progressed through four elimination rounds to reach the final. The match was won by Dundee United 2–1, marking their first win in the tournament since its inception and their first silverware since the 2009–10 Scottish Cup.

== Route to the final ==
The competition is a knock-out tournament and was contested by 52 teams from Scotland, Wales and Northern Ireland in 2016-17. Those participating were the 30 clubs that played in the 2016–17 Championship, League One and League Two of the Scottish Professional Football League along with the top four teams from the 2015–16 Highland and Lowland Leagues (East Stirlingshire, who were relegated from the SPFL, took the place of the Lowland League champions Edinburgh City, who promoted in their place). The top two teams from the 2015–16 Welsh Premier League and 2015–16 NIFL Premiership and the U20s squads of the teams competing in the 2016–17 Premiership were also invited to compete. For the first three rounds, the draw was divided into two geographical regions – north and south. These draws were seeded to avoid U20s teams and Highland and Lowland League sides from being drawn against each other. From round four onwards, the draw was regionalised to keep Welsh and Northern Irish teams apart.

As both clubs play in the Championship, they received a bye to the third round.

=== Dundee United ===
Round	Opposition	Score
Third round	Peterhead (h)	3–2 (a.e.t.)
Fourth round	Stranraer (a)	1–0
Quarter-final	Dunfermline Athletic (a)	1–0
Semi-final	Queen of the South (a)	3–2

=== St Mirren ===
Round	Opposition	Score
Third round	Albion Rovers (a)	4–3 (a.e.t.)
Fourth round	Hibernian (a)	2–1
Quarter-final	Ayr United (h)	2–1
Semi-final	(Wales) The New Saints (h)	4–1

== Match details ==
25 March 2017
12:30
Final

Dundee United	2–1	St Mirren
Andreu 37'; Mikkelsen 75'	SPFL report	Loy 38'

Fir Park, Motherwell
Attendance: 8,089
Referee: Nick Walsh

Dundee United	St Mirren

Dundee United:
GK	1	(Scotland) Cammy Bell (c)
RB	8	(Scotland) Stewart Murdoch
CB	14	(France) William Edjenguélé
CB	4	(Scotland) Mark Durnan
LB	24	(Scotland) Jamie Robson
CM	16	(Scotland) Charlie Telfer
CM	14	(Republic of Ireland) Willo Flood (yellow card)
RW	22	(Scotland) Ali Coote (substituted off) 89'
AM	19	(France) Tony Andreu
LW	23	(Netherlands) Nick van der Velden (substituted off) 58'
CF	9	(Scotland) Simon Murray (yellow card) (substituted off) 80'
Substitutes:
GK	21	(Germany) Luis Zwick
DF	3	(Scotland) Paul Dixon
DF	5	(Scotland) Coll Donaldson (substituted on) 89'
DF	6	(Scotland) Lewis Toshney
DF	20	(Netherlands) Frank van der Struijk
MF	11	(England) Alex Nicholls (substituted on) 80'
FW	18	(Denmark) Thomas Mikkelsen (substituted on) 58'
Manager:
(Scotland) Ray McKinnon

St Mirren:
GK	21	(Wales) Billy O'Brien
RB	3	(Scotland) Gary Irvine
CB	6	(Scotland) Gary MacKenzie
CB	15	(Scotland) Jack Baird
LB	44	(England) Adam Eckersley
RM	42	(Scotland) Kyle Magennis (substituted off) 84'
CM	10	(Scotland) Stevie Mallan (yellow card)
CM	22	(Scotland) Stephen McGinn (c)
LM	17	(Scotland) Lewis Morgan
CF	16	(Scotland) Rory Loy (yellow card)
CF	9	(England) John Sutton
Substitutes:
GK	1	(Scotland) Jamie Langfield
DF	2	(Cyprus) Stelios Demetriou
DF	4	(Scotland) Andy Webster
MF	23	(Norway) Pål Fjelde
MF	35	(Scotland) Darren Whyte
MF	36	(Scotland) Connor O'Keefe (substituted on) 84'
FW	50	(Scotland) Ryan Watters
Manager:
(Scotland) Jack Ross

- Man of the Match: Tony Andreu

Match rules

- 90 minutes.
- 30 minutes of extra-time if necessary.
- Penalty shoot-out if scores still level.
- Seven named substitutes.
- Maximum of three substitutions.
