= Eckersley =

Eckersley is a surname. Notable people with the surname include:

- Adam Eckersley (born 1985), English footballer
- Adam Eckersley (musician), Australian singer, guitarist and songwriter
- Bill Eckersley (1925–1982), English footballer
- Charles Ewart Eckersley (1892–1967), English teacher and author
- David Eckersley, English rugby player
- Dennis Eckersley (born 1954), American baseball player
- Julie Eckersley, Australian actress, comedian and writer
- Nathaniel Eckersley (1815–1892), English mill-owner, banker and Conservative Party politician
- Ned Eckersley, (born 1989), English cricketer
- Neil Eckersley (born 1964), British judoka
- Peter Eckersley (computer scientist) (1979–2022), Australian computer scientist, computer security researcher
- Peter Eckersley (cricketer) (1904–1940), English cricketer, Conservative Party politician
- Peter Eckersley (engineer) (PP Eckersley) (1892–1963), pioneer of British broadcasting
- Peter Eckersley (TV producer) (1935–1981), British television producer, Head of Drama at Granada Television
- Richard Eckersley (designer) (1941–2006), graphic designer known for experimental computerized typography
- Richard Eckersley (footballer) (born 1989), English footballer
- Robyn Eckersley, Australian political scientist
- Ronald Eckersley (born 1925), English cricketer
- Scott Eckersley, Democratic nominee in United States House of Representatives elections in Missouri, 2010
- Thomas Eckersley FRS (1886–1959), English theoretical physicist and engineer
- Tom Eckersley (1914–1997), English poster artist and design teacher
- Tom Eckersley (footballer) (born 1991), English footballer

== See also ==
- Eckersweiler
- Kearsley
- Keresley
- Wickersley
