= 2016–17 St Mirren F.C. season =

St Mirren
2016–17 season
- Chairman: Gordon Scott
- Manager: Alex Rae (until 18 September); Allan McManus (interim from 19 September–8 October); Jack Ross (from 9 October)
- Stadium: St Mirren Park
- Championship: 7th
- Challenge Cup: Runners Up lost to Dundee United
- League Cup: Group Stage (Eliminated)
- Scottish Cup: Quarter-finals lost to Celtic
- Top goalscorer: League: John Sutton & Stevie Mallan (7 goals); All: John Sutton (13 goals)
- Highest home attendance: 4,997 vs Greenock Morton (6 August 2016)
- Lowest home attendance: 2,126 vs Dunfermline Athletic (19 November 2016)
- Average home league attendance: 3,599
Home colours	Away colours	Third colours

The 2016–17 season is the club's second season in the Scottish Championship. St Mirren will also compete in the Challenge Cup, the League Cup and the Scottish Cup.

== Month by month review ==
=== May ===
3 May – The club announced the departure of 13 players from last seasons playing squad. The players leaving at the end of their contracts are Sean Kelly, Jim Goodwin, Alan Gow, Stuart Carswell, Cameron Howieson, Scott Agnew, Barry Cuddihy, Jaison McGrath and Alex Cooper. Saints icon Steven Thompson has retired, Keith Watson has signed a pre-contract agreement with St Johnstone, and loanees David Clarkson and Lawrence Shankland return to their parent clubs.

9 May – Midfielder, Jordan Stewart, signed a one-year professional contract with the club.

10 May – Kyle Hutton signed a two-year contract with the club, after leaving Queen of the South.

13 May – forward Calum Gallagher signed a one-year contract extension, keeping him at the club until the summer of 2017.

19 May – after being released by Motherwell, forward David Clarkson returned to Saints after signing a one-year deal.

20 May – Andy Webster, who was club captain for most of last season, signed a one-year contract extension with the club.

=== June ===
2 June – 30-year-old defender Ben Gordon signed for Saints after leaving relegated Livingston. Gordon was a former youth player with Saints, and signed a one-year deal.

21 June – defender Gary MacKenzie signed a one-year deal with Saints after being released by Doncaster Rovers.

23 June – goalkeeper Scott Gallacher signed a one-year deal with the club, after leaving Alloa Athletic.

28 June – former Saints striker, John Sutton, returned to the club after signing a two-year deal.

=== July ===
17 July – midfielder Tom Walsh joined the club on a six-month loan deal from Rangers.

19 July – Aberdeen striker Lawrence Shankland returned to the club on a season-long loan deal, after having a success spell with the club last season.

22 July – Gordon Scott became the new chairman of the club, after a takeover was completed today. Scott and the St Mirren Independent Supporters Association (SMISA) bought out former chairman Stewart Gilmour.

26 July – striker Ryan Hardie joined on loan from Rangers until January 2017.

=== August ===
4 August – Lewis Morgan signed a one-year contract extension, tying him to the club until 2018.

=== September ===
16 September – Defender Ben Gordon, joined Alloa Athletic on loan until January 2017, a week after making his debut for Saints.

18 September – after a winless start to the season, manager Alex Rae and his assistant manager David Farrell, were sacked. The head of the Saints academy, Allan McManus, takes over as interim boss.

=== October ===
4 October – Alloa Athletic manager, Jack Ross, was appointed new Saints manager.

7 October – James Fowler was appointed new Saints Assistant manager.

=== November ===
14 November – Saints were drawn at home to Welsh side, The New Saints, in the Semi-finals of the Scottish Challenge Cup.

29 November – midfielder Kyle Hutton moved to Scottish League One side Airdrieonians on an emergency loan deal until January 2017.

=== December ===
9 December – teenage forward Kyle Magennis signed a two-year contract extension after recently breaking into the first team.

=== January ===
3 January – Saints signed Aberdeen midfielder Craig Storie on loan until the end of the season, while Rangers loanees Tom Walsh and Ryan Hardie left the club.

11 January – striker Lawrence Shankland left the club when his season long loan deal was cut short, and immediately joined Greenock Morton on loan for the remainder of the season.

12 January – Saints signed striker Rory Loy on loan from Dundee, and Norwegian midfielder Pål Fjelde from Bryne FK. Both players join until the end of the season.

Also on this day, it was confirmed that defender Jason Naismith had signed a pre-contract agreement with Scottish Premiership side Ross County. He will join them in the summer once his contract with Saints expires.

13 January – forward Calum Gallagher left the club to join fellow Scottish Championship side Dumbarton. Gallagher made 54 appearances for the club, scoring 8 goals in all competition.

16 January – Saints signed midfielder Josh Todd from Dumbarton until the end of the season.

18 January – defender Jason Naismith left the club, to join Scottish Premiership side Ross County. A pre-contract deal had recently been confirmed, but a deal was agreed so that Naismith could job County immediately. Naismith leaves the club after five years, scoring 4 goals in 106 appearances.

19 January – 21 year-old goalkeeper Billy O'Brien signed for the club on loan from Manchester City until the end of the season.

20 January – Cypriot defender Stelios Demetriou signed for the club until the end of the season from Doxa Katokopias.

22 January – Saints were drawn away to Scottish League One side East Fife in the Scottish Cup 5th Round.

25 January – goalkeeper Scott Gallacher left the club by mutual consent, after having his one-year contract cut short. He made 16 appearances in his time at the club.

26 January – 21-year-old Aberdeen forward Cammy Smith joined Saints on loan until the end of the season.

27 January – Young starlet Kyle McAllister left the club, moving to EFL Championship side Derby County on a three-and-a-half-year deal for an undisclosed fee. On the same day, former Saints midfielder Stephen McGinn returned to the club on an 18-month deal after recently leaving Wycombe Wanderers.

31 January – Saints signed defenders Adam Eckersley and Harry Davis on the winter transfer deadline day. Eckersley signed from FC Edmonton until the end of the season, and Davis signed on loan until the end of the season from Crewe Alexandra

On the same day Jordan Stewart and Kalvin Orsi left the club on loan deals, to Annan Athletic and Queen's Park respectively.

=== February ===
19 February – Saints reached the final of the Challenge Cup, after beating Welsh side The New Saints 4–1 in the Semi-finals. The final with Dundee United will take place in March 2017. This is the third time the club have reached the final of the competition.

== Squad list ==
As of 7 May 2017

No.	Name	Nationality	Position	Date of birth (age)	Signed from	Signed in	Signed until	Apps.	Goals
Goalkeepers
1	Jamie Langfield	(Scotland)	GK	22 December 1979 (age 46)	Aberdeen	2015	2017	52	0
21	Billy O'Brien	(Wales)	GK	21 November 1995 (age 30)	Manchester City (loan)	2017	2017	20	0
Defenders
2	Stelios Demetriou	(Cyprus)	DF	4 October 1990 (age 35)	Doxa Katokopias	2017	2017	15	3
3	Gary Irvine	(Scotland)	DF	17 March 1985 (age 41)	Dundee	2016	2017	60	0
4	Andy Webster	(Scotland)	DF	23 April 1982 (age 44)	(England) Coventry City	2015	2017	55	0
5	Ben Gordon	(Scotland)	DF	7 October 1985 (age 40)	Livingston	2016	2017	9	2
6	Gary MacKenzie	(Scotland)	DF	15 October 1985 (age 40)	Doncaster Rovers	2016	2017	37	5
15	Jack Baird	(Scotland)	DF	7 February 1996 (age 30)	St Mirren youth team	2014	2017	81	4
24	Harry Davis	(England)	DF	24 September 1991 (age 34)	Crewe Alexandra (loan)	2017	2017	9	3
44	Adam Eckersley	(England)	DF	7 September 1985 (age 40)	FC Edmonton	2017	2017	15	0
Midfielders
8	Rocco Quinn	(Scotland)	MF	7 September 1986 (age 39)	Ross County	2016	2018	31	1
10	Stevie Mallan	(Scotland)	MF	25 March 1996 (age 30)	St Mirren youth team	2014	2018	112	29
17	Lewis Morgan	(Scotland)	MF	30 September 1996 (age 29)	Rangers	2014	2018	76	11
18	Lewis McLear	(Scotland)	MF	26 May 1996 (age 30)	St Mirren youth team	2014	2018	21	0
20	Craig Storie	(Scotland)	MF	13 January 1996 (age 30)	Aberdeen (loan)	2017	2017	11	0
22	Stephen McGinn (c)	(Scotland)	MF	2 December 1988 (age 37)	Wycombe Wanderers	2017	2018	105	11
23	Pål Fjelde	(Norway)	MF	26 July 1994 (age 32)	Bryne FK	2017	2017	6	0
25	Josh Todd	(England)	MF	11 June 1994 (age 32)	Dumbarton	2017	2017	11	1
42	Kyle Magennis	(Scotland)	MF	26 August 1998 (age 28)	St Mirren youth team	2016	2019	32	3
Forwards
7	David Clarkson	(Scotland)	FW	10 September 1985 (age 40)	Motherwell	2016	2017	36	5
9	John Sutton	(England)	FW	26 December 1983 (age 42)	St Johnstone	2016	2018	123	43
11	Cammy Smith	(Scotland)	FW	24 August 1995 (age 31)	Aberdeen (loan)	2017	2017	17	2
16	Rory Loy	(Scotland)	FW	19 March 1988 (age 38)	Dundee (loan)	2017	2017	25	7

== Results & fixtures ==
Win Draw Loss Postponed

=== Pre season / Friendlies ===
5 July 2016 Friendly (Closed Doors)	St Mirren	4–3	Stirling Albion	Ralston Training Complex
19:00	Clarkson; Sutton	Report	Smith; Ferns

9 July 2016 Friendly	Livingston	Cancelled	St Mirren	Almondvale Stadium
15:00

9 July 2016 Friendly	Stenhousemuir	1–3	St Mirren	Ochilview Park
14:00	Smith 13'	Report	Clarkson 38', 68'; Sutton 66'	Referee: Alan Muir

12 July 2016 Friendly (Closed Doors)	St Mirren	1–0	Airdrieonians	Ralston Training Complex
	Clarkson

=== Scottish Championship ===
6 August 2016 1	St Mirren	1–1	Greenock Morton	St Mirren Park
15:00	Sutton 83'	BBC Report	O'Ware 17'	Attendance: 4,997; Referee: Steven McLean

13 August 2016 2	Raith Rovers	3–1	St Mirren	Stark's Park
15:00	McManus 17', 51'; Callachan 50'	BBC Report	Hardie 63'	Attendance: 2,140; Referee: Kevin Graham

20 August 2016 3	St. Mirren	0–2	Hibernian	St Mirren Park
15:00		BBC Report	Cummings 22', 32'	Attendance: 4,517; Referee: Don Robertson

27 August 2016 4	Ayr United	1–1	St Mirren	Somerset Park
15:00	Adams 14'	BBC Report	Walsh 89'	Attendance: 2,165; Referee: Crawford Allan

10 September 2016 5	St Mirren	1–3	Queen of the South	St Mirren Park
15:00	Walsh 41'	BBC Report	Lyle 12', 43'; Dobbie 55'	Attendance: 3,102; Referee: Barry Cook

17 September 2016 6	Dumbarton	1–1	St Mirren	The Cheaper Insurance Direct Stadium
15:00	Stirling 15'	BBC Report	Hardie 41'	Attendance: 1,101; Referee: Stephen Finnie

24 September 2016 7	Dunfermline Athletic	4–3	St Mirren	East End Park
17:15	Clark 40', 77'; Webster 62' (o.g.); El Alagui 85'	BBC Report	Sutton 31', 45'; Hardie 81'	Attendance: 2,732; Referee: Greg Aitken

1 October 2016 8	St Mirren	1–1	Falkirk	St Mirren Park
17:15	Walsh 87'	BBC Report	Sibbald 9'	Attendance: 2,344; Referee: John Beaton

15 October 2016 9	St Mirren	0–2	Dundee United	St Mirren Park
15:00		BBC Report	Fraser 38'; Andreu 74'	Attendance: 3,612; Referee: Nick Walsh

29 October 2016 10	Hibernian	2–0	St Mirren	Easter Road
15:00	Boyle 8'; Holt 34'	BBC Report		Attendance: 14,485; Referee: Don Robertson

1 November 2016 11	Greenock Morton	3–1	St Mirren	Cappielow
19:45	O'Ware 15'; Forbes 27'; Oliver 68'	BBC Report	Gordon 86'	Attendance: 3,378; Referee: Willie Collum

5 November 2016 12	St Mirren	0–1	Dumbarton	St Mirren Park
15:00		BBC Report	Fleming 63'	Attendance: 2,758; Referee: John McKendrick

19 November 2016 13	St Mirren	0–1	Dunfermline Athletic	St Mirren Park
17:15		BBC Report	Clark 26'	Attendance: 2,126; Referee: Nick Walsh

3 December 2016 14	Falkirk	3–1	St Mirren	Falkirk Stadium
15:00	Miller 47'; McHugh 78'; Hippolyte 83'	BBC Report	Morgan 17'	Attendance: 4,486; Referee: Craig Thomson

6 December 2016 15	Queen of the South	2–3	St Mirren	Palmerston Park
19:45	Dobbie 17', 42'	BBC Report; SPFL report	Magennis 20'; Gordon 57'; Mallan 90+3'	Attendance: 1,147; Referee: Crawford Allan

10 December 2016 16	St Mirren	1–0	Raith Rovers	St Mirren Park
15:00	Morgan 47'	BBC Report		Attendance: 2,630; Referee: Barry Cook

17 December 2016 17	St Mirren	1–1	Ayr United	St Mirren Park
15:00	Sutton 81'	BBC Report	Cairney 63'	Attendance: 3,124; Referee: Greg Aitken

24 December 2016 18	Dundee United	2–1	St Mirren	Tannadice Park
15:00	Fraser 28'; Murray 45'	BBC Report	Sutton 27'	Attendance: 7,247; Referee: John McKendrick

31 December 2016 19	St Mirren	1–1	Greenock Morton	St Mirren Park
15:00	MacKenzie 30'	BBC Report	Lamie 90+3'	Attendance: 4,902; Referee: Nick Walsh

7 January 2017 20	St Mirren	0–3	Queen of the South	St Mirren Park
15:00		BBC Report	Dobbie 45'; Thomson 81'; MacKenzie 88' (o.g.)	Attendance: 3,105; Referee: Mat Northcroft

14 January 2017 21	Dunfermline Athletic	1–1	St Mirren	East End Park
15:00	Higginbotham 37' (pen.)	BBC Report	MacKenzie 46'	Attendance: 4,108; Referee: Willie Collum

28 January 2017 22	St Mirren	1–2	Falkirk	St Mirren Park
15:00	Loy 77'	BBC Report	Baird 11', 63'	Attendance: 3,316; Referee: Alan Muir

4 February 2017 23	Dumbarton	2–2	St Mirren	The Cheaper Insurance Direct Stadium
15:00	Nade 56'; R Thomson 80'	BBC Report	Clarkson 35'; Davis 71'	Attendance: 1,377; Referee: John Beaton

25 February 2017 24	Ayr United	0–2	St Mirren	Somerset Park
15:00		BBC Report	Sutton 51'; Morgan 82'	Attendance: 2,712; Referee: Craig Thomson

1 March 2017 25	St Mirren	2–0	Hibernian	St Mirren Park
19:45	Demetriou 35', 46'	BBC Report		Attendance: 3,441; Referee: Euan Anderson

8 March 2017 26	Raith Rovers	2–0	St Mirren	Stark's Park
19:45	Hardie 74', 80'	BBC Report		Attendance: 2,124; Referee: Crawford Allan

11 March 2017 27	St Mirren	0–0	Dunfermline Athletic	St Mirren Park
15:00		BBC Report		Attendance: 4,582; Referee: Stephen Finnie

15 March 2017 28	St Mirren	3–2	Dundee United	St Mirren Park
19:45	Davis 2'; Mallan 37'; Morgan 59'	BBC Report	Andreu 33', 69'	Attendance: 2,766; Referee: Greg Aitken

18 March 2017 29	Queen of the South	0–2	St Mirren	Palmerston Park
15:00		BBC Report	Mallan 44'; Loy 54' (pen.)	Attendance: 1,728; Referee: Andrew Dallas

1 April 2017 30	St Mirren	6–2	Ayr United	St Mirren Park
15:00	Mallan 5'; MacKenzie 20'; McGinn 23'; Magennis 36'; Morgan 52'; Smith 88'	BBC Report	Cairney 74'; El Alagui 87'	Attendance: 4,620; Referee: Gavin Duncan

8 April 2017 31	St Mirren	1–1	Dumbarton	St Mirren Park
15:00	Magennis 10'	BBC Report	Vaughan 37'	Attendance: 3,906; Referee: Steven Kirkland

11 April 2017 32	Greenock Morton	1–4	St Mirren	Cappielow
19:45	Murdoch 29'	BBC Report	Demetriou 20'; Mallan 45'; Sutton 56'; MacKenzie 80'	Attendance: 4,609; Referee: Stephen Finnie

15 April 2017 33	Falkirk	2–2	St Mirren	Falkirk Stadium
15:00	Miller 20'; McHugh 77'	BBC Report	Loy 5'; McGinn 59'	Attendance: 4,734; Referee: Craig Thomson

22 April 2017 34	Dundee United	3–2	St Mirren	Tannadice Park
15:00	Mikkelsen 7'; Andreu 66'; Spittal 90'	BBC Report	MacKenzie 38'; Todd 86'	Attendance: 6,225; Referee: Craig Charleston

29 April 2017 35	St Mirren	5–0	Raith Rovers	St Mirren Park
15:00	Mallan 27', 59'; McManus 39' (o.g.); Loy 48'; Morgan 87'	BBC Report		Attendance: 4,937; Referee: Kevin Clancy

6 May 2017 36	Hibernian	1–1	St Mirren	Easter Road
15:00	Holt 49'	BBC Report	Loy 60'	Attendance: 19,764; Referee: Alan Muir

=== Scottish Challenge Cup ===
3 September 2016 Round 3	Albion Rovers	3 – 4 (a.e.t.)	St Mirren	Cliftonhill
15:00	Ross Dunlop 6', 40'; Michael Dunlop 13'	SPFL report	Morgan 30'; Mallan 35'; Sutton 38'; Shankland 98'	Attendance: 711; Referee: Mike Roncone

8 October 2016 Round 4	Hibernian	1–2	St Mirren	Easter Road
15:00	Harris 37'	BBC Report	Mallan 41'; Clarkson 82'	Attendance: 4,393; Referee: Willie Collum

13 November 2016 Quarter-finals	St Mirren	2–1	Ayr United	St Mirren Park
12:30	Sutton 83', 85'	BBC Report	Andy O'Connell 68'	Attendance: 2,199; Referee: Crawford Allan

19 February 2017 Semi-finals	St Mirren	4–1	The New Saints	St Mirren Park
16:10	McGinn 60'; Mallan 65'; Sutton 80'; Loy 90+1'	BBC Report	Brobbel 41'	Attendance: 2,044; Referee: Keith Kennedy

25 March 2017 Final	Dundee United	2–1	St Mirren	Fir Park
12:30	Andreu 37'; Mikkelsen 75'	BBC Report	Loy 38'	Attendance: 8,089; Referee: Nick Walsh

=== Scottish League Cup ===
16 July 2016 Group G	Livingston	2–3	St Mirren	Almondvale Stadium
15:00	Nicky Cadden 50'; Carrick 68'	BBC Report	Clarkson 13', 81'; Morgan 74'	Attendance: 894; Referee: Gavin Duncan

19 July 2016 Group G	St Mirren	1–0	Ayr United	St Mirren Park
19:45	Baird 90+3'	BBC Report		Attendance: 2,098; Referee: John Beaton

23 July 2016 Group G	Hamilton Academical	3–0	St Mirren	New Douglas Park
15:00	Crawford 13'; Imrie 51'; Donati 70'	SPFL Report		Attendance: 1,379; Referee: Don Robertson

30 July 2016 Group G	St Mirren	3–0	Edinburgh City	St Mirren Park
15:00	Shankland 12'; Walsh 30'; Baird 33'	SPFL Report		Attendance: 1,800; Referee: Steven Kirkland

=== Scottish Cup ===
26 November 2016 Round 3	St Mirren	5–1	Spartans	St Mirren Park
15:00	Shankland 15', 68'; Mallan 20'; McAllister 32'; Sutton 63'	BBC Report	Jack Beesley 73'	Attendance: 1,147; Referee: Kevin Graham

21 January 2017 Round 4	Dundee	0–2	St Mirren	Dens Park
15:00		BBC Report	Sutton 25'; Baird 50'	Attendance: 3,622; Referee: Bobby Madden

11 February 2017 Round 5	East Fife	2–3	St Mirren	Bayview Stadium
15:00	Duggan 54' (pen.), 90+3' (pen.)	BBC Report	Smith 33'; Morgan 70', 84'	Attendance: 1,510; Referee: Don Robertson

5 March 2017 Quarter-finals	Celtic	4–1	St Mirren	Celtic Park
12:30	Lustig 58'; Sinclair 59'; Dembélé 68'; Griffiths 78'	BBC Report	Davis 13'	Attendance: 27,455; Referee: Steven McLean

== Player statistics ==
=== Captains ===
No.	P	Name	Country	No. games	Notes
22	MF	Stephen McGinn	(Scotland)	18	
3	DF	Gary Irvine	(Scotland)	17	
4	DF	Andy Webster	(Scotland)	14	

Last updated: 7 May 2017
Source: Competitive match reports.
Competitive matches only
Matches started as captain only
Country: FIFA nationality; No.: Squad number; P: Position; Name: Player name; No. Games: Number of games started as captain.

=== Appearances and goals ===
Last updated 7 May 2017

No.	Pos	Nat	Player	Total		Championship		Challenge Cup		League Cup		Scottish Cup	
No.	Pos	Nat	Player	Apps	Goals	Apps	Goals	Apps	Goals	Apps	Goals	Apps	Goals
1	GK	(Scotland) SCO	Jamie Langfield	13	0	9+0	0	2+0	0	2+0	0	0+0	0
2	DF	(Cyprus) CYP	Stelios Demetriou	15	3	6+6	3	1+0	0	0+0	0	2+0	0
3	DF	(Scotland) SCO	Gary Irvine	44	0	33+0	0	4+1	0	3+0	0	3+0	0
4	DF	(Scotland) SCO	Andy Webster	20	0	10+5	0	1+0	0	4+0	0	0+0	0
5	DF	(Scotland) SCO	Ben Gordon	9	2	6+2	2	0+0	0	0+0	0	1+0	0
6	DF	(Scotland) SCO	Gary MacKenzie	37	5	29+0	5	4+0	0	0+0	0	4+0	0
7	FW	(Scotland) SCO	David Clarkson	24	4	7+9	1	2+1	1	4+0	2	0+1	0
8	MF	(Scotland) SCO	Rocco Quinn	18	0	11+3	0	1+1	0	1+0	0	0+1	0
9	FW	(England) ENG	John Sutton	48	13	24+11	7	5+0	4	3+1	0	3+1	2
10	MF	(Scotland) SCO	Stevie Mallan	47	11	34+0	7	5+0	3	4+0	0	4+0	1
11	FW	(Scotland) SCO	Cammy Smith	17	2	15+0	1	0+0	0	0+0	0	2+0	1
15	DF	(Scotland) SCO	Jack Baird	36	3	21+4	0	4+0	0	4+0	2	1+2	1
16	FW	(Scotland) SCO	Rory Loy	17	7	11+2	5	2+0	2	0+0	0	1+1	0
17	MF	(Scotland) SCO	Lewis Morgan	46	10	31+2	6	4+1	1	4+0	1	3+1	2
18	MF	(Scotland) SCO	Lewis McLear	3	0	0+3	0	0+0	0	0+0	0	0+0	0
20	MF	(Scotland) SCO	Craig Storie	11	0	3+4	0	1+0	0	0+0	0	2+1	0
21	GK	(Wales) WAL	Billy O'Brien	20	0	15+0	0	2+0	0	0+0	0	3+0	0
22	MF	(Scotland) SCO	Stephen McGinn	19	3	14+1	2	2+0	1	0+0	0	2+0	0
23	MF	(Norway) NOR	Pål Fjelde	6	0	1+2	0	0+1	0	0+0	0	1+1	0
24	DF	(England) ENG	Harry Davis	9	3	6+0	2	1+0	0	0+0	0	2+0	1
25	MF	(England) ENG	Josh Todd	11	1	1+10	1	0+0	0	0+0	0	0+0	0
35	MF	(Scotland) SCO	Darren Whyte	2	0	0+1	0	0+0	0	0+0	0	0+1	0
36	MF	(Scotland) SCO	Connor O'Keefe	1	0	0+0	0	0+1	0	0+0	0	0+0	0
39	DF	(Scotland) SCO	Andrew McDonald	1	0	0+0	0	0+1	0	0+0	0	0+0	0
40	MF	(Scotland) SCO	Cameron MacPherson	1	0	0+0	0	0+0	0	0+0	0	0+1	0
42	MF	(Scotland) SCO	Kyle Magennis	32	3	21+4	3	3+0	0	0+0	0	4+0	0
44	DF	(England) ENG	Adam Eckersley	15	0	12+0	0	2+0	0	0+0	0	1+0	0
Players who left the club during the season:
2	DF	(Scotland) SCO	Jason Naismith (joined Ross County)	28	0	21+0	0	2+0	0	4+0	0	1+0	0
11	FW	(Scotland) SCO	Calum Gallagher (joined Dumbarton)	13	0	2+6	0	0+1	0	3+1	0	0+0	0
12	GK	(Scotland) SCO	Scott Gallacher (released)	16	0	12+0	0	1+0	0	2+0	0	1+0	0
14	MF	(Scotland) SCO	Kyle Hutton (on loan at Airdrieonians)	17	0	11+0	0	2+0	0	4+0	0	0+0	0
16	FW	(Scotland) SCO	Tom Walsh (end of loan)	16	4	4+6	3	2+1	0	1+2	1	0+0	0
19	DF	(Scotland) SCO	Jordan Stewart (on loan at Annan Athletic)	7	0	1+2	0	1+1	0	1+1	0	0+0	0
20	FW	(Scotland) SCO	Ryan Hardie (end of loan)	17	3	8+8	3	0+0	0	0+1	0	0+0	0
25	FW	(Scotland) SCO	Lawrence Shankland (end of loan)	24	4	7+10	0	0+3	1	1+2	1	1+0	2
29	MF	(Scotland) SCO	Kyle McAllister (joined Derby County)	14	1	10+0	0	1+0	0	0+1	0	2+0	1
34	MF	(Scotland) SCO	Kalvin Orsi (on loan at Queen's Park)	1	0	0+0	0	0+0	0	0+0	0	0+1	0

=== Disciplinary record ===
Includes all competitive matches.

Last updated 7 May 2017

Number	Nation	Position	Name	Total		Championship		Challenge Cup		League Cup		Scottish Cup	
Number	Nation	Position	Name	Booked	Sent off (straight red)	Booked	Sent off (straight red)	Booked	Sent off (straight red)	Booked	Sent off (straight red)	Booked	Sent off (straight red)
15	(Scotland)	DF	Jack Baird	5	1	4	1	0	0	1	0	0	0
44	(England)	DF	Adam Eckersley	1	1	1	1	0	0	0	0	0	0
3	(Scotland)	MF	Gary Irvine	7	0	7	0	0	0	0	0	0	0
6	(Scotland)	DF	Gary MacKenzie	7	0	5	0	2	0	0	0	0	0
10	(Scotland)	MF	Stevie Mallan	6	0	3	0	1	0	1	0	1	0
4	(Scotland)	DF	Andy Webster	5	0	4	0	1	0	0	0	0	0
2	(Cyprus)	DF	Stelios Demetriou	4	0	3	0	0	0	0	0	1	0
7	(Scotland)	FW	David Clarkson	3	0	2	0	0	0	1	0	0	0
8	(Scotland)	MF	Rocco Quinn	3	0	3	0	0	0	0	0	0	0
16	(Scotland)	FW	Rory Loy	3	0	2	0	1	0	0	0	0	0
20	(Scotland)	MF	Craig Storie	3	0	2	0	0	0	0	0	1	0
22	(Scotland)	FW	Stephen McGinn	3	0	3	0	0	0	0	0	0	0
24	(England)	DF	Harry Davis	2	0	1	0	0	0	0	0	1	0
5	(Scotland)	DF	Ben Gordon	1	0	1	0	0	0	0	0	0	0
9	(England)	FW	John Sutton	1	0	1	0	0	0	0	0	0	0
11	(Scotland)	FW	Cammy Smith	1	0	1	0	0	0	0	0	0	0
17	(Scotland)	MF	Lewis Morgan	1	0	1	0	0	0	0	0	0	0
25	(England)	FW	Josh Todd	1	0	1	0	0	0	0	0	0	0
39	(Scotland)	DF	Andrew McDonald	1	0	0	0	1	0	0	0	0	0
Players who left the club during the season:
2	(Scotland)	DF	Jason Naismith	3	0	3	0	0	0	0	0	0	0
14	(Scotland)	MF	Kyle Hutton	7	0	5	0	1	0	1	0	0	0
19	(Scotland)	DF	Jordan Stewart	2	0	2	0	0	0	0	0	0	0
25	(Scotland)	FW	Lawrence Shankland	4	0	3	0	1	0	0	0	0	0

== Team statistics ==
=== League table ===
Pos	Team	Pld	W	D	L	GF	GA	GD	Pts	Promotion, qualification or relegation
5	Dunfermline Athletic	36	12	12	12	46	43	+3	48	
6	Queen of the South	36	11	10	15	46	52	−6	43	
7	St Mirren	36	9	12	15	52	56	−4	39	
8	Dumbarton	36	9	12	15	46	56	−10	39	
9	Raith Rovers (R)	36	10	9	17	35	52	−17	39	Qualification for the Championship play-offs

Source: Soccerway
Rules for classification: 1) Points; 2) Goal difference; 3) Number of goals scored
(R) Relegated

=== Division summary ===
Round	1	2	3	4	5	6	7	8	9	10	11	12	13	14	15	16	17	18	19	20	21	22	23	24	25	26	27	28	29	30	31	32	33	34	35	36
Ground	H	A	H	A	H	A	A	H	H	A	A	H	H	A	A	H	H	A	H	H	A	H	A	A	H	A	H	H	A	H	H	A	A	A	H	A
Result	D	L	L	D	L	D	L	D	L	L	L	L	L	L	W	W	D	L	D	L	D	L	D	W	W	L	D	W	W	W	D	W	D	L	W	D
Position	7	9	9	9	10	10	10	10	10	10	10	10	10	10	10	10	10	10	10	10	10	10	10	10	10	10	10	10	10	10	9	8	8	9	8	7

Updated to match(es) played on 7 May 2017. Source:
A = Away; H = Home; W = Win; D = Draw; L = Loss

=== Management statistics ===
Last updated on 7 May 2017

Name	From	To	P	W	D	L	Win% (Note: Win% is the percentage of matches won rounded to two decimal places.)
Alex Rae	3 May 2016	18 September 2016	11	4	3	4	36.36
Allan McManus	19 September 2016	8 October 2016	3	1	1	1	33.33
Jack Ross	9 October 2016	Present	35	14	8	13	40.00

== Transfers ==
=== Players in ===
Position	Nationality	Name	From	Transfer Window	Ends	Fee	Source
MF	(Scotland)	Kyle Hutton	Queen of the South	Summer	2018	Free	
FW	(Scotland)	David Clarkson	Motherwell	Summer	2017	Free	
DF	(Scotland)	Ben Gordon	Livingston	Summer	2017	Free	
DF	(Scotland)	Gary MacKenzie	Doncaster Rovers	Summer	2017	Free	
GK	(Scotland)	Scott Gallacher	Alloa Athletic	Summer	2017	Free	
FW	(England)	John Sutton	St Johnstone	Summer	2018	Free	
FW	(Scotland)	Tom Walsh	Rangers	Summer	2017 (January)	Loan	
FW	(Scotland)	Lawrence Shankland	Aberdeen	Summer	2017 (Summer)	Loan	
FW	(Scotland)	Ryan Hardie	Rangers	Summer	2017 (January)	Loan	
MF	(Scotland)	Craig Storie	Aberdeen	Winter	2017 (Summer)	Loan	
FW	(Scotland)	Rory Loy	Dundee	Winter	2017 (Summer)	Loan	
MF	(Norway)	Pål Fjelde	Bryne FK	Winter	2017	Free	
MF	(England)	Josh Todd	Dumbarton	Winter	2017	Free	
GK	(Wales)	Billy O'Brien	Manchester City	Winter	2017	Loan	
DF	(Cyprus)	Stelios Demetriou	Doxa Katokopias	Winter	2017	Free	
FW	(Scotland)	Cammy Smith	Aberdeen	Winter	2017	Loan	
MF	(Scotland)	Stephen McGinn	Wycombe Wanderers	Winter	2018	Free	
DF	(England)	Harry Davis	Crewe Alexandra	Winter	2017	Loan	
DF	(England)	Adam Eckersley	FC Edmonton	Winter	2017	Free	

=== Players out ===
Position	Nationality	Name	To / Type	Transfer Window	Fee	Source
DF	(Scotland)	Sean Kelly	End of contract	Summer	Free	
MF	(Republic of Ireland)	Jim Goodwin	Alloa Athletic	Summer	Free	
MF	(Scotland)	Alan Gow	End of contract	Summer	Free	
MF	(Scotland)	Stuart Carswell	End of contract	Summer	Free	
MF	(New Zealand)	Cameron Howieson	End of contract	Summer	Free	
MF	(Scotland)	Scott Agnew	Stranraer	Summer	Free	
MF	(Scotland)	Barry Cuddihy	End of contract	Summer	Free	
FW	(Scotland)	Jaison McGrath	End of contract	Summer	Free	
MF	(England)	Alex Cooper	End of contract	Summer	Free	
FW	(Scotland)	Steven Thompson	Retired	Summer	Free	
DF	(Scotland)	Keith Watson	St Johnstone	Summer	Free	
FW	(Scotland)	David Clarkson	End of loan	Summer	Loan	
FW	(Scotland)	Lawrence Shankland	End of loan	Summer	Loan	
DF	(Scotland)	Ben Gordon	Alloa Athletic	Winter	Loan	
MF	(Scotland)	Kyle Hutton	Airdrieonians	Winter	Loan	
FW	(Scotland)	Tom Walsh	Rangers	Winter	Loan end	
FW	(Scotland)	Ryan Hardie	Rangers	Winter	Loan end	
FW	(Scotland)	Lawrence Shankland	Aberdeen	Winter	Loan end	
FW	(Scotland)	Calum Gallagher	Dumbarton	Winter	Free	
DF	(Scotland)	Jason Naismith	Ross County	Winter	Undisclosed fee	
GK	(Scotland)	Scott Gallacher	Contract terminated	Winter	Free	
FW	(Scotland)	Kyle McAllister	Derby County	Winter	Undisclosed fee	
MF	(Scotland)	Jordan Stewart	Annan Athletic	Winter	Loan	
DF	(Scotland)	Kalvin Orsi	Queen's Park	Winter	Loan	

== See also ==
- List of St Mirren F.C. seasons
