= 2017–18 St Mirren F.C. season =

St Mirren
2017–18 season
- Chairman: Gordon Scott
- Manager: Jack Ross
- Stadium: St Mirren Park
- Championship: 1st (champions)
- Challenge Cup: Third Round lost to Raith Rovers
- League Cup: Group Stage (Eliminated)
- Scottish Cup: Fourth round lost to Aberdeen
- Top goalscorer: League: Lewis Morgan (14 goals); All: Gavin Reilly (22 goals)
- Highest home attendance: 6,422 vs Greenock Morton (21 April 2018)
- Lowest home attendance: 3,023 vs Queen of the South (24 September 2017)
- Average home league attendance: 4,448
Home colours	Away colours	Third colours

The 2017–18 season is the club's third season in the Scottish Championship. St Mirren will also compete in the Challenge Cup, the League Cup and the Scottish Cup.

== Month by month review ==
=== May ===
9 May – defender Adam Eckersley signed a two-year contract extension with the club, tying him to the club until the summer of 2019. It was also confirmed that Ben Gordon, Andy Webster and Jordan Stewart would leave the club when their contracts expire in the summer.

11 May – young defender Jack Baird signed a one-year contract extension with the club.

15 May – veteran goalkeeper Jamie Langfield signed a one-year contract extension with the club. It is anticipated that Langfield will fulfil a coaching role, rather than be involved in a playing capacity.

18 May – highly rated midfielder Stevie Mallan signed a two-year contract with EFL Championship side Barnsley for an undisclosed fee.

19 May – midfielder Josh Todd signed a one-year contract extension with the club after signing in January.

22 May – defender Gary MacKenzie became the fifth player to sign a contract extension this summer, signing up for another season with the club. Also on this day, forward Cammy Smith left Aberdeen and joined Saints on a two-year deal, after a successful loan spell last season.

23 May – midfielder Kyle Hutton was released by the club, when his contract was terminated by mutual agreement.

24 May – young midfielder Kyle Magennis signed a new deal with the club, committing him to the summer of 2020.

Also on this day, Saints signed goalkeeper Ross M. Stewart from Albion Rovers and midfielder Jordan Kirkpatrick from Alloa Athletic. Both players have penned two-year deals with the club.

26 May – Jack Ross recruited two more players when forward Ross C. Stewart signed a two-year contract from Albion Rovers, and defender Gregor Buchanan signed from Dumbarton one a one-year deal.

=== June ===
2 June – Saints were paired along with Partick Thistle, Airdrieonians, Stranraer and Livingston in the League Cup draw. Fixtures will commence from 15 to 19 July.

7 June – goalkeeper Craig Samson rejoined Saints on a two-year deal after leaving Motherwell, tying him to the club until June 2019.

12 June – after impressing in his short time at the club, defender Stelios Demetriou signed a one-year contract extension in June 2017.

13 June – striker Gavin Reilly signed a one-year deal after leaving Heart of Midlothian.

15 June – defender Gary Irvine signed a one-year contract extension.

16 June – young midfielder Nathan Flanagan signed a one-year contract with the club, after graduating from the youth setup.

27 June – striker Dale Hilson signed a six-month deal with the club, after leaving Queen of the South.

29 June – youngster Lewis McLear left the club by mutual agreement. The midfielder had been at the club for three years, but failed to breakthrough to the first team.

=== July ===
13 July – midfielder Ian McShane signed a two-year deal with Saints, after leaving Ross County.

=== August ===
1 August – defender Harry Davis joined the club, after being released by Crewe Alexandra. Davis was on loan at Saints last year, and joins on a one-year deal with the option of a further year.

3 August – Rocco Quinn left the club by mutual agreement, after just one year of his two-year deal.

4 August – Jack Ross and assistant, James Fowler, signed contract extensions with the club – ensuring they remain with the club until at least 2020.

10 August – striker Darryl Duffy signed a one-year deal with Saints, having recently played in India.

14 August – Saints signed defender Liam Smith on a one-year loan from Hearts.

=== September ===
22 September – Saints signed Celtic defender Jamie McCart on an emergency loan, following injuries and suspensions. McCart signed until 23 December 2017.

=== December ===
12 December – striker Danny Mullen signed on an emergency loan from fellow Scottish Championship challengers, Livingston. It was reported than Mullen will sign on a permanent contract in January 2018, when his loan period expires.

21 December – forward Ross C. Stewart moved on loan to Scottish League One side Alloa Athletic, until the end of the season.

28 December – defender Jamie McCart ended his loan period, and returned to Celtic.

31 December – forward Dale Hilson was released after his short-term contract expired. He made five appearances for the club, scoring one goal.

=== January ===
5 January – Lewis Morgan signed a 4 1/2-year contract with Celtic and was immediately loaned back to Saints until the end of the season. The fee was undisclosed, but is thought to have been around £300,000.

10 January – striker Darryl Duffy signed on loan for Scottish League One side Airdrieonians until the end of the season.

11 January – defender Gregor Buchanan left the club by mutual consent. He made 16 appearances, and scored two goal since joining at the start of the season. He signed for Livingston later in the day.

Also on this day, it was confirmed that Danny Mullen had signed a 2 1/2-year permanent deal with Saints, tying him to the club until the summer of 2020.

12 January – manager Jack Ross received the Scottish Championship December Manager of the Month award.

15 January – Saints added to the squad when experienced midfielder Ryan Flynn signed, after being recently released by Oldham Athletic. The 29-year-old joins on a two-and-a-half-year deal.

16 January – 19-year-old midfielder Mark Hill signed on loan from Celtic until the end of the season.

19 January – midfielder Jordan Kirkpatrick returned to Alloa Athletic on loan until the end of the season.

31 January – winger Myles Hippolyte signed on an 18-month contract after being released by Falkirk.

Also on this day, youngster Cameron MacPherson signed on loan for Stranraer until the end of the season.

=== February ===
1 February – defender Jack Baird signed a one-year extension to his current contract, keeping his at Saints until the summer of 2019.

6 February – manager Jack Ross received the Scottish Championship January Manager of the Month award, his second such award in a row. Saints captain Stephen McGinn also won the Player of the Month award.

20 February – veteran Italian midfielder Massimo Donati signed a short-term contract until the end of the season. Donati left Premiership side Hamilton Academical last month.

=== March ===
20 March – Josh Todd signed for Queen of the South on an emergency loan deal until the end of the season.

=== April ===
5 April – Jack Ross received the Scottish Championship March Manager of the Month award, making it a hat-trick of awards for the season.

14 April – Saints won the Scottish Championship after a goalless draw at home to Livingston. It ended the club's three-year exile from the Scottish Premiership, after being relegated in 2015.

20 April – club captain, Stephen McGinn, penned a new two-year contract with the club after leading Saints to the Scottish Premiership.

29 April – Jack Ross was named PFA Manager of the Year, and Lewis Morgan was named Scottish Championship Player of the Year.

== Squad list ==
As of 30 April 2018

No.	Name	Nationality	Position	Date of birth (age)	Signed from	Signed in	Signed until	Apps.	Goals
Goalkeepers
1	Craig Samson	(Scotland)	GK	1 April 1984 (age 42)	Motherwell	2017	2019	145	0
21	Ross M. Stewart	(Scotland)	GK	10 April 1995 (age 31)	Albion Rovers	2017	2019	4	0
41	Jamie Langfield	(Scotland)	GK	22 December 1979 (age 46)	Aberdeen	2015	2018	52	0
Defenders
2	Stelios Demetriou	(Cyprus)	DF	4 October 1990 (age 35)	Doxa Katokopias	2017	2018	46	4
3	Gary Irvine	(Scotland)	DF	17 March 1985 (age 41)	Dundee	2016	2018	72	0
6	Gary MacKenzie	(Scotland)	DF	15 October 1985 (age 40)	Doncaster Rovers	2016	2018	55	6
15	Jack Baird	(Scotland)	DF	7 February 1996 (age 30)	St Mirren youth team	2014	2019	119	6
24	Harry Davis	(England)	DF	24 September 1991 (age 34)	Crewe Alexandra	2017	2018	31	6
25	Liam Smith	(Scotland)	DF	10 April 1996 (age 30)	Heart of Midlothian (loan)	2017	2018	34	2
44	Adam Eckersley	(England)	DF	7 September 1985 (age 40)	FC Edmonton	2017	2019	42	2
Midfielders
4	Stephen McGinn (c)	(Scotland)	MF	2 December 1988 (age 37)	Wycombe Wanderers	2017	2020	148	12
5	Massimo Donati	(Italy)	MF	26 March 1981 (age 45)	Hamilton Academical	2018	2018	1	0
7	Kyle Magennis	(Scotland)	MF	26 August 1998 (age 27)	St Mirren youth team	2016	2020	61	5
10	Lewis Morgan	(Scotland)	MF	30 September 1996 (age 29)	Celtic (loan)	2018	2018	118	29
14	Josh Todd	(England)	MF	11 June 1994 (age 32)	Dumbarton	2017	2018	14	1
16	Ian McShane	(Scotland)	MF	20 December 1992 (age 33)	Ross County	2017	2019	40	5
17	Jordan Kirkpatrick	(Scotland)	MF	6 March 1992 (age 34)	Alloa Athletic	2017	2019	14	0
18	Ryan Flynn	(Scotland)	MF	4 September 1988 (age 37)	Oldham Athletic	2018	2020	14	1
22	Darren Whyte	(Scotland)	MF	16 March 1997 (age 29)	St Mirren youth team	2017	2018	4	0
23	Nathan Flanagan	(Scotland)	MF	4 May 1997 (age 29)	St Mirren youth team	2017	2018	0	0
26	Mark Hill	(Scotland)	MF	10 July 1998 (age 27)	Celtic (loan)	2018	2018	4	0
30	Cameron MacPherson	(Scotland)	MF	29 December 1998 (age 27)	St Mirren youth team	2015	2018	6	0
31	Connor O'Keefe	(Scotland)	MF	21 July 1998 (age 27)	St Mirren youth team	2014	2018	6	0
39	Ethan Erhahon	(Scotland)	MF	9 May 2001 (age 25)	St Mirren youth team	2017	2019	2	0
Forwards
8	Darryl Duffy	(Scotland)	FW	16 April 1984 (age 42)	Mohun Bagan	2017	2018	4	0
9	John Sutton	(England)	FW	26 December 1983 (age 42)	St Johnstone	2016	2018	144	45
11	Cammy Smith	(Scotland)	FW	24 August 1995 (age 30)	Aberdeen	2017	2019	60	15
19	Ross C. Stewart	(Scotland)	FW	1 September 1996 (age 29)	Albion Rovers	2017	2019	17	2
20	Gavin Reilly	(Scotland)	FW	10 May 1993 (age 33)	Heart of Midlothian	2017	2018	44	22
27	Danny Mullen	(Scotland)	FW	1 March 1995 (age 31)	Livingston	2017	2020	20	3
29	Myles Hippolyte	(England)	FW	9 November 1994 (age 31)	Falkirk	2018	2019	8	1

== Results & fixtures ==
Win Draw Loss Postponed

=== Pre season / Friendlies ===
30 June 2017 Friendly	Clachnacuddin	0–5	St Mirren	Grant Street Park
19:45			RC Stewart 8'; C. Smith 54'; Ross MacKillop 63' (o.g.); Sutton 78'; Morgan 81'

2 July 2017 Friendly	Nairn County	0–9	St Mirren	Station Park
14:00		Nairn FC report	Sutton 7'; Magennis 38'; Hilson 45', 62'; C. Smith 74'; Demetriou 78'; RC Stewart 81'; Darren Whyte 88'	Attendance: 369; Referee: Billy Baxter

4 July 2017 Friendly	St Mirren	1–3	Dundee	St Mirren Park
19:45	Reilly 56'	St Mirren report	O'Dea 11', 39'; Haber 49'	Attendance: TBA; Referee: Barry Cook

8 July 2017 Friendly	Alloa Athletic	0–0	St Mirren	The Indodrill Stadium
15:00		St Mirren report		Attendance: TBA; Referee: TBC

=== Scottish Championship ===
5 August 2017 1	St Mirren	3–1	Falkirk	St Mirren Park
15:00	Demetriou 33'; C. Smith 46'; Reilly 69'	BBC Report	Hippolyte 2'	Attendance: 4,639; Referee: Don Robertson

12 August 2017 2	Greenock Morton	4–1	St Mirren	Cappielow
15:00	Tidser 26' (pen.), 50' (pen.); McHugh 72'; Murdoch 77'	BBC Report	C. Smith 41'	Attendance: 4,661; Referee: Willie Collum

19 August 2017 3	Livingston	1–3	St Mirren
15:00	Halkett 15'	BBC Report	Halkett 9' (o.g.); Reilly 51', 60'	Attendance: 1,609; Referee: Craig Thomson

26 August 2017 4	St Mirren	3–0	Dundee United	St Mirren Park
15:00	Morgan 26', 48'; McShane 78'	BBC Report		Attendance: 4,768; Referee: Kevin Clancy

9 September 2017 5	St Mirren	4–2	Inverness Caledonian Thistle	St Mirren Park
15:00	Morgan 31'; Buchanan 63'; C. Smith 73'; McShane 74'	BBC Report	Baird 61'; Polworth 69'	Attendance: 3,610; Referee: Willie Collum

16 September 2017 6	Dunfermline Athletic	3–0	St Mirren	East End Park
15:00	McManus 20'; Hopkirk 45'; Morris 56'	BBC Report		Attendance: 6,628; Referee: Craig Thomson

24 September 2017 7	St Mirren	3–1	Queen of the South	St Mirren Park
16:10	C. Smith 24'; Morgan 27', 54'	BBC Report	Kerr 64'	Attendance: 3,023; Referee: Barry Cook

30 September 2017 8	St Mirren	2–1	Brechin City	St Mirren Park
15:00	C. Smith 14'; Hilson 78'	BBC Report	Orsi 38'	Attendance: 3,928; Referee: Gavin Duncan

14 October 2017 9	Dumbarton	0–2	St Mirren	Dumbarton Football Stadium
15:00		BBC Report	Reilly 36'; Sutton 70'	Attendance: 1,178; Referee: Alan Newlands

21 October 2017 10	Falkirk	0–0	St Mirren	Falkirk Stadium
15:00		BBC Report		Attendance: 5,080; Referee: Don Robertson

28 October 2017 11	St Mirren	2–2	Greenock Morton	St Mirren Park
15:00	McShane 66' (pen.); Reilly 72'	BBC Report	Murdoch 68'; Harkins 79' (pen.)	Attendance: 5,496; Referee: Steven McLean

4 November 2017 12	Dundee United	2–1	St Mirren	Tannadice Park
15:00	Durnan 11'; Stanton 79'	BBC Report	Eckersley 90+3'	Attendance: 6,936; Referee: Greg Aitken

25 November 2017 13	Inverness Caledonian Thistle	0–2	St Mirren
15:00		BBC Report	McShane 52' (pen.); Reilly 90+2'	Attendance: 2,687; Referee: John McKendrick

28 November 2017 14	St Mirren	3–1	Livingston	St Mirren Park
19:45	Morgan 51'; Eckersley 66'; McShane 78' (pen.)	BBC Report	Carrick 30'	Attendance: 3,177; Referee: Gavin Duncan

2 December 2017 15	St Mirren	0–1	Dumbarton	St Mirren Park
15:00		BBC Report	Walsh 80'	Attendance: 3,591; Referee: Andrew Dallas

9 December 2017 16	Brechin City	1–2	St Mirren	Glebe Park
15:00	Layne 27'	BBC Report	Reilly 20'; C. Smith 64' (pen.)	Attendance: 812; Referee: Colin Steven

16 December 2017 17	St Mirren	1–0	Dunfermline Athletic	St Mirren Park
15:00	C. Smith 38'	BBC Report		Attendance: 3,665; Referee: Craig Charleston

23 December 2017 18	Queen of the South	2–3	St Mirren	Palmerston Park
15:00	Dobbie 1'; Kane 6'	BBC Report	Reilly 19', 35'; MacKenzie 68'	Attendance: 2,019; Referee: Steven McLean

29 December 2017 19	St Mirren	2–0	Dundee United	St Mirren Park
19:45	Morgan 59', 78'	BBC Report		Attendance: 6,214; Referee: Don Robertson

2 January 2018 20	Greenock Morton	1–1	St Mirren	Cappielow
15:00	O'Ware 80'	BBC Report	Morgan 25'	Attendance: 4,126; Referee: Kevin Clancy

6 January 2018 21	St Mirren	1–0	Inverness Caledonian Thistle	St Mirren Park
15:00	Reilly 26'	BBC Sport		Attendance: 4,448; Referee: Willie Collum

13 January 2018 22	Dumbarton	0–2	St Mirren	Dumbarton Football Stadium
15:00		BBC Report	C. Smith 47'; McGinn 58'	Attendance: 1,652; Referee: Gavin Duncan

26 January 2018 23	Dunfermline Athletic	1–2	St Mirren	East End Park
19:45	Clark 49'	BBC Report	C. Smith 13'; Baird 64'	Attendance: 5,479; Referee: John Beaton

3 February 2018 24	St Mirren	2–0	Queen of the South	St Mirren Park
15:00	L. Smith 4'; Davis 32' (pen.)	BBC Report		Attendance: 4,585; Referee: Steven Kirkland

17 February 2018 25	Livingston	4–1	St Mirren	Almondvale Stadium
15:00	Hardie 9', 15'; Miller 22'; Robinson 90+4'	BBC Report	Flynn 2'	Attendance: 2,708; Referee: Alan Muir

24 February 2018 26	St Mirren	1–0	Brechin City	St Mirren Park
15:00	P. O'Neil 15' (o.g.)	BBC Report		Attendance: 4,358; Referee: Steven McLean

10 March 2018 27	St Mirren	2–0	Dunfermline Athletic	St Mirren Park
15:00	Davis 69' (pen.); L. Smith 72'	BBC Report		Attendance: 4,240; Referee: Nick Walsh

17 March 2018 28	Queen of the South	1–3	St Mirren	Palmerston Park
15:00	Marshall 21'	BBC Report	Mullen 17'; Morgan 52'; Magennis 63'	Attendance: 1,902; Referee: Bobby Madden

27 March 2018 29	St Mirren	5–0	Dumbarton	St Mirren Park
19:45	Morgan 13', 85'; C. Smith 32'; Mullen 49'; Reilly 70'	BBC Report		Attendance: 3,964; Referee: Colin Steven

31 March 2018 30	Inverness Caledonian Thistle	2–2	St Mirren	Caledonian Stadium
15:00	Warren 78'; Polworth 81'	BBC Report	Davis 4' (pen.); Morgan 70'	Attendance: 3,025; Referee: Alan Newlands

7 April 2018 31	Brechin City	0–1	St Mirren	Glebe Park
15:00		BBC Report	Magennis 7'	Attendance: 2,447; Referee: David Munro

10 April 2018 32	Dundee United	1–0	St Mirren	Tannadice Park
19:45	King 3'	BBC Sport		Attendance: 5,905; Referee: Andrew Dallas

14 April 2018 33	St Mirren	0–0	Livingston	St Mirren Park
15:00		BBC Report		Attendance: 6,172; Referee: John Beaton

17 April 2018 34	St Mirren	1–2	Falkirk	St Mirren Park
19:45	Hippolyte 55' (pen.)	BBC Report	McKee 83'; Sibbald 90'	Attendance: 3,761; Referee: Alan Muir

21 April 2018 35	St Mirren	2–1	Greenock Morton	St Mirren Park
15:00	Mullen 10'; Morgan 72'	BBC Report	Doyle 30'	Attendance: 6,422; Referee: Bobby Madden

28 April 2018 36	Falkirk	1–0	St Mirren	Falkirk Stadium
15:00	Blair 85'	BBC Report		Attendance: 5,508; Referee: Stephen Finnie

=== Scottish Challenge Cup ===
15 August 2017 Round 1	St Mirren	2–1	East Kilbride	St Mirren Park
19:45	RC Stewart 87'; Morgan 90+2'	SPFL Report	Dominic McLaren 81'	Attendance: 1,357; Referee: John McKendrick

2 September 2017 Round 2	St Mirren	3–1	Hearts U20s	St Mirren Park
15:00	Reilly 8', 48'; Sutton 83'	SPFL Report	Currie 81'	Attendance: 1,130; Referee: Craig Charleston

7 October 2017 Round 3	St Mirren	1–3	Raith Rovers	St Mirren Park
15:00	Reilly 63'	SPFL Report	Vaughan 64'; Spence 73'; Barr 81'	Attendance: 1,970; Referee: Euan Anderson

=== Scottish League Cup ===
15 July 2017 Group H	Stranraer	1–4	St Mirren	Stair Park
15:00	Agnew 11'	BBC Report	Reilly 27'; RC Stewart 31'; Morgan 40'; Buchanan 56'	Attendance: 849; Referee: Colin Steven

18 July 2017 Group H	St Mirren	0–1	Livingston	St Mirren Park
19:45		BBC Report	Carrick 2'	Attendance: 2,104; Referee: Alan Muir

22 July 2017 Group H	Partick Thistle	5–0	St Mirren	Firhill Stadium
15:00	Doolan 12'; Lawless 23', 33'; Spittal 38', 59'	BBC Report		Attendance: 2,727; Referee: Stephen Finnie

29 July 2017 Group H	St Mirren	5–0	Airdrieonians	St Mirren Park
15:00	C. Smith 9', 88'; Reilly 31', 69'; Morgan 82'	BBC Report		Attendance: 1,557; Referee: Craig Napier

=== Scottish Cup ===
18 November 2017 Round 3	Lothian Thistle	1–7	St Mirren	Saughton Enclosure
15:00	Sean Wringe 47'	BBC Report	Morgan 4'; Reilly 8', 32', 36', 42'; Baird 17'; C. Smith 24'	Attendance: 1,132; Referee: David Lowe

20 January 2018 Round 4	Aberdeen	4–1	St Mirren	Pittodrie Stadium
12:15	Rooney 8' (pen.); Christie 18', 33'; Mackay-Steven 47'	BBC Report	Reilly 25'	Attendance: 9,848; Referee: Don Robertson

== Player statistics ==
=== Appearances and goals ===
As of 30 April 2018

No.	Pos	Player	Championship		Challenge Cup		League Cup		Scottish Cup		Total	
No.	Pos	Player	Apps	Goals	Apps	Goals	Apps	Goals	Apps	Goals	Apps	Goals
1	GK	(Scotland) Craig Samson	36+0	0	0+0	0	3+0	0	2+0	0	41	0
2	DF	(Cyprus) Stelios Demetriou	17+6	1	2+1	0	3+0	0	2+0	0	31	1
3	DF	(Scotland) Gary Irvine	5+2	0	1+0	0	4+0	0	0+0	0	12	0
4	MF	(Scotland) Stephen McGinn	35+0	1	2+0	0	4+0	0	2+0	0	43	1
5	MF	(Italy) Massimo Donati	1+0	0	0+0	0	0+0	0	0+0	0	1	0
6	DF	(Scotland) Gary MacKenzie	12+2	1	0+0	0	4+0	0	0+0	0	18	1
7	MF	(Scotland) Kyle Magennis	25+2	2	0+0	0	0+0	0	2+0	0	29	2
8	FW	(Scotland) Darryl Duffy	0+2	0	1+1	0	0+0	0	0+0	0	4	0
9	FW	(England) John Sutton	3+13	1	0+1	1	1+2	0	0+1	0	21	2
10	MF	(Scotland) Lewis Morgan	34+1	14	1+0	1	4+0	2	2+0	1	42	18
11	FW	(Scotland) Cammy Smith	33+1	10	2+1	0	4+0	2	2+0	1	43	13
14	MF	(England) Josh Todd	1+2	0	0+0	0	0+0	0	0+0	0	3	0
15	DF	(Scotland) Jack Baird	27+4	1	3+0	0	2+0	0	2+0	1	38	2
16	MF	(Scotland) Ian McShane	26+5	5	3+0	0	4+0	0	2+0	0	40	5
17	MF	(Scotland) Jordan Kirkpatrick	1+7	0	0+2	0	1+3	0	0+0	0	14	0
18	MF	(Scotland) Ryan Flynn	11+2	1	0+0	0	0+0	0	0+1	0	14	1
19	FW	(Scotland) Ross C. Stewart	1+8	0	2+1	1	2+2	1	0+1	0	17	2
20	FW	(Scotland) Gavin Reilly	27+8	11	2+1	3	4+0	3	2+0	5	44	22
21	GK	(Scotland) Ross M. Stewart	0+0	0	3+0	0	1+0	0	0+0	0	4	0
22	MF	(Scotland) Darren Whyte	0+1	0	0+0	0	1+0	0	0+0	0	2	0
23	MF	(Scotland) Nathan Flanagan	0+0	0	0+0	0	0+0	0	0+0	0	0	0
24	DF	(England) Harry Davis	20+0	3	0+0	0	0+0	0	2+0	0	22	3
25	DF	(Scotland) Liam Smith	32+0	2	1+0	0	0+0	0	1+0	0	34	2
26	MF	(Scotland) Mark Hill	2+1	0	0+0	0	0+0	0	0+1	0	4	0
27	FW	(Scotland) Danny Mullen	11+8	3	0+0	0	0+0	0	0+1	0	20	3
29	FW	(England) Myles Hippolyte	2+6	1	0+0	0	0+0	0	0+0	0	8	1
30	MF	(Scotland) Cameron MacPherson	0+4	0	0+1	0	0+0	0	1+0	0	6	0
31	MF	(Scotland) Connor O'Keefe	0+2	0	1+0	0	0+3	0	0+0	0	6	0
39	MF	(Scotland) Ethan Erhahon	1+0	0	1+0	0	0+0	0	0+0	0	2	0
41	GK	(Scotland) Jamie Langfield	0+0	0	0+0	0	0+0	0	0+0	0	0	0
44	DF	(England) Adam Eckersley	24+0	2	3+0	0	0+0	0	0+0	0	27	2
Players who left the club during the season:
5	DF	(Scotland) Gregor Buchanan	7+3	1	3+0	0	2+1	1	0+0	0	16	2
8	MF	(Scotland) Rocco Quinn	0+0	0	0+0	0	0+1	0	0+0	0	1	0
18	FW	(Scotland) Dale Hilson	0+2	1	2+0	0	0+0	0	0+1	0	5	1
26	DF	(Scotland) Jamie McCart	3+0	0	0+0	0	0+0	0	0+0	0	3	0

=== Disciplinary record ===
Includes all competitive matches.

Last updated 30 April 2018

Number	Nation	Position	Name	Total		Scottish Championship		Challenge Cup		League Cup		Scottish Cup	
Number	Nation	Position	Name	Booked	Sent off (straight red)	Booked	Sent off (straight red)	Booked	Sent off (straight red)	Booked	Sent off (straight red)	Booked	Sent off (straight red)
2	(Cyprus)	DF	Stelios Demetriou	5	1	3	1			2			
44	(England)	DF	Adam Eckersley	4	1	4	1						
3	(Scotland)	DF	Gary Irvine	2	1	2	1						
15	(Scotland)	DF	Jack Baird	2	1	1	1			1			
4	(Scotland)	MF	Stephen McGinn	6	0	6							
11	(Scotland)	FW	Cammy Smith	5	0	4				1			
16	(Scotland)	MF	Ian McShane	4	0	3				1			
1	(Scotland)	GK	Craig Samson	3	0	3							
7	(Scotland)	MF	Kyle Magennis	2	0	2							
27	(Scotland)	FW	Danny Mullen	2	0	2							
10	(Scotland)	MF	Lewis Morgan	2	0	2							
20	(Scotland)	FW	Gavin Reilly	2	0	1		1					
6	(Scotland)	DF	Gary MacKenzie	1	0					1			
17	(Scotland)	MF	Jordan Kirkpatrick	1	0	1							
19	(Scotland)	FW	Ross C. Stewart	1	0	1							
24	(England)	DF	Harry Davis	1	0	1							
25	(Scotland)	DF	Liam Smith	1	0	1							
Players who left the club during the season:
5	(Scotland)	DF	Gregor Buchanan	3	1	3	1						
8	(Scotland)	MF	Rocco Quinn	1	0					1			
26	(Scotland)	DF	Jamie McCart	1	0	1							

== Team statistics ==
=== League table ===
Pos	Team	Pld	W	D	L	GF	GA	GD	Pts	Promotion, qualification or relegation
1	St Mirren (C, P)	36	23	5	8	63	36	+27	74	Promotion to the Premiership
2	Livingston (O, P)	36	17	11	8	56	37	+19	62	Qualification for the Premiership play-off semi-final
3	Dundee United	36	18	7	11	52	42	+10	61	Qualification for the Premiership play-off quarter-final
4	Dunfermline Athletic	36	16	11	9	60	35	+25	59	Qualification for the Premiership play-off quarter-final
5	Inverness Caledonian Thistle	36	16	9	11	53	37	+16	57	
6	Queen of the South	36	14	10	12	59	53	+6	52	
7	Greenock Morton	36	13	11	12	47	40	+7	50	
8	Falkirk	36	12	11	13	45	49	−4	47	
9	Dumbarton (R)	36	7	9	20	27	63	−36	30	Qualification for the Championship play-offs
10	Brechin City (R)	36	0	4	32	20	90	−70	4	Relegation to League One

Source: Soccerway
Rules for classification: 1) Points; 2) Goal difference; 3) Goals scored; 4) Points in head-to-head matches; 5) Goal difference in hth matches; 6). Goals scored in hth matches; 7). Play-off (only for deciding promotion, play-off participation and relegation).
(C) Champions; (O) Play-off winners; (P) Promoted; (R) Relegated

=== Division summary ===
Round	1	2	3	4	5	6	7	8	9	10	11	12	13	14	15	16	17	18	19	20	21	22	23	24	25	26	27	28	29	30	31	32	33	34	35	36
Ground	H	A	A	H	H	A	H	H	A	A	H	A	A	H	H	A	H	A	H	A	H	A	A	H	A	H	H	A	H	A	A	A	H	H	H	A
Result	W	L	W	W	W	L	W	W	W	D	D	L	W	W	L	W	W	W	W	D	W	W	W	W	L	W	W	W	W	D	W	L	D	L	W	L
Position	2	5	4	3	1	2	2	1	1	1	1	1	2	1	2	2	1	1	1	1	1	1	1	1	1	1	1	1	1	1	1	1	1	1	1	1

Updated to match(es) played on 30 April 2018. Source:
A = Away; H = Home; W = Win; D = Draw; L = Loss

=== Management statistics ===
Last updated on 30 April 2018

Name	From	To	P	W	D	L	Win% (Note: Win% is the percentage of matches won rounded to two decimal places.)
Jack Ross	9 October 2016	Present	80	42	13	25	52.50

== Transfers ==
=== Players in ===
Position	Nationality	Name	From	Transfer Window	Ends	Fee	Source
FW	(Scotland)	Cammy Smith	Aberdeen	Summer	2019	Free	
GK	(Scotland)	Ross M. Stewart	Albion Rovers	Summer	2019	Undisclosed fee	
MF	(Scotland)	Jordan Kirkpatrick	Alloa Athletic	Summer	2019	Free	
DF	(Scotland)	Gregor Buchanan	Dumbarton	Summer	2018	Free	
FW	(Scotland)	Ross C. Stewart	Albion Rovers	Summer	2019	Undisclosed fee	
GK	(Scotland)	Craig Samson	Motherwell	Summer	2019	Free	
FW	(Scotland)	Gavin Reilly	Heart of Midlothian	Summer	2018	Free	
FW	(Scotland)	Dale Hilson	Queen of the South	Summer	January 2018	Free	
MF	(Scotland)	Ian McShane	Ross County	Summer	2019	Free	
DF	(England)	Harry Davis	Crewe Alexandra	Summer	2018	Free	
FW	(Scotland)	Darryl Duffy	Mohun Bagan	Summer	2018	Free	
DF	(Scotland)	Liam Smith	Hearts	Summer	2018	Loan	
DF	(Scotland)	Jamie McCart	Celtic	Summer	2017	Loan	
FW	(Scotland)	Danny Mullen	Livingston	Winter	2017	Loan, then Permanent	
MF	(Scotland)	Lewis Morgan	Celtic	Winter	2018	Loan	
MF	(Scotland)	Ryan Flynn	Oldham Athletic	Winter	2020	Free	
MF	(Scotland)	Mark Hill	Celtic	Winter	2018	Loan	
FW	(England)	Myles Hippolyte	Falkirk	Winter	2019	Free	
MF	(Italy)	Massimo Donati	Hamilton Academical	Winter	2018	Free	

=== Players out ===
Position	Nationality	Name	To / Type	Transfer Window	Fee	Source
DF	(Scotland)	Ben Gordon	Released	Summer	Free	
DF	(Scotland)	Andy Webster	Released	Summer	Free	
MF	(Scotland)	Jordan Stewart	Released	Summer	Free	
MF	(Scotland)	Stevie Mallan	Barnsley	Summer	Undisclosed fee	
MF	(Scotland)	Kyle Hutton	Released	Summer	Free	
MF	(Scotland)	Lewis McLear	Released	Summer	Free	
MF	(Scotland)	Rocco Quinn	Released	Summer	Free	
FW	(Scotland)	Ross C. Stewart	Alloa Athletic	Winter	Loan	
DF	(Scotland)	Jamie McCart	Celtic	Winter	Loan end	
FW	(Scotland)	Dale Hilson	Released	Winter	Free	
MF	(Scotland)	Lewis Morgan	Celtic	Winter	£300,000	
FW	(Scotland)	Darryl Duffy	Airdrieonians	Winter	Loan	
DF	(Scotland)	Gregor Buchanan	Livingston	Winter	Free	
MF	(Scotland)	Jordan Kirkpatrick	Alloa Athletic	Winter	Loan	
MF	(Scotland)	Cameron MacPherson	Stranraer	Winter	Loan	
MF	(Scotland)	Josh Todd	Queen of the South	Winter	Loan	

== See also ==
- List of St Mirren F.C. seasons
