= P. A. Ogundipe =

Nigerian educator and civil servant (1927–2020)

OON P. A. Ogundipe
- Born: Phebean Itayemi; 6 May 1927; Esa-Oke, Osun State
- Died: 27 March 2020 (aged 92); Charlotte, North Carolina
- Education: University of St. Andrews Institute of Education, University of London
- Alma mater: University of London
- Occupations: Civil servant; writer
- Notable work: Up-Country Girl; Nothing So Sweet
- Spouse: Adebayo Ogundipe
- Children: 4

Phebean Ajibola Ogundipe, née Itayemi, OON (1927–2020) was a Nigerian author and civil servant. Writing as Phebean Itayemi, she became the first Nigerian woman to be published in English, after winning a British Council short story competition. She later published textbooks under the name P. A. Ogundipe.

== Life ==
Phebean Ogundipe was born in Esa-Oke, Osun State on 6 May 1927 of Ijesha origin. She attended elementary school in Esa-oke and Imesi-ile before going to Queen's College, Lagos for secondary schooling. She gained a degree at the University of St Andrews, and a diploma from the Institute of Education at the University of London. Returning to Nigeria, she became an English teacher.

Ogundipe story Nothing So Sweet won a 1946 British Council competition for the western region of Nigeria, coming ahead of the contributions of T. M. Aluko and Cyprian Ekwensi. The story portrays a teenage girl who endures abduction as part of an attempt to conclude an arranged marriage. At the end of the story the young woman achieves freedom, leaving her village at night to train as a nurse.

Ogundipe met her husband, Adebayo Ogundipe, the younger brother of Babafemi Ogundipe, who later rose to become Chief of Staff Supreme Headquarters between January and August 1966, while teaching with him at Queen's School, Ede. In 1960 she became an education officer in the Western Region, and became Principal of Adeyemi College of Education. Moving to the Federal Ministry of Education in 1966, she was promoted to senior education officer. She oversaw the integration of a federal universal primary education scheme with that of the Western State. She retired as assistant director of education in December 1976.

In 2013 Ogundipe published a book of memoirs, Up-Country Girl. She died on 27 March 2020 in Charlotte, North Carolina.

== Works ==
- 'Nothing So Sweet', in T. Cullen Young, ed., New African Writing: Short stories by African authors, London: Lutterworth Press, 1947.
- (ed. with P. Gurrey) Folk Tales and Fables. London: Penguin, 1953.
- (with Una Maclean and Molly Mahood) 'Three Views of The Swamp Dwellers', Ibadan, Vol. 6 (June 1959), pp. 27–30
- Practical English: a comprehensive secondary course. 1965.
- (with Mabel Dove-Danquah) The Torn Veil, and Other Stories. Evans Bros, 1975.
- (with Margaret Macaulay and C. E. Eckersley) Brighter grammar : an English grammar with exercises. Harlow: Longman, 1983.
- New practical English. 1985.
- Up-Country Girl: A Personal Journey and Truthful Portrayal of African Culture. AuthorHouse, 2013.
