= Craig Storie =

Scottish footballer

Personal information
- Date of birth: 13 January 1996 (age 30)
- Place of birth: Scotland
- Position: Midfielder

Youth career
- Glasgow Centre
- 2012–2013: Aberdeen

Senior career*
Years	Team	Apps	(Gls)
2013–2018	Aberdeen	14	(0)
2013	→ Forfar Athletic (loan)	4	(0)
2015	→ Brechin City (loan)	9	(0)
2017	→ St Mirren (loan)	7	(0)
2018	Brechin City	0	(0)

International career^{‡}
2011	Scotland U15	2	(0)
2010–2011	Scotland U16	10	(3)
2011	Scotland U17	2	(0)
2014–2015	Scotland U19	7	(0)
2016	Scotland U21	2	(0)
- * Club domestic league appearances and goals as of 22 February 2018 ‡ National team caps and goals as of 4 March 2019

Craig Storie (born 13 January 1996) is a Scottish professional footballer who last played as a midfielder for Brechin City.

== Career ==
=== Aberdeen ===
After spending time with Glasgow Centre, Storie signed as a professional with Aberdeen of the Scottish Premier League in 2012. Before signing with Aberdeen, Storie rejected an offer from Manchester United after Willie Miller convinced Storie that he would get more chances with the first-team at Aberdeen.

Storie made his professional debut for Aberdeen on 27 April 2013, in a league match against Kilmarnock in which he started and played 45 minutes as Aberdeen won the match 1–0.

On 7 November 2013, Storie signed a one-month loan deal with Forfar Athletic.

On 30 January 2015, Storie joined Brechin City on loan for the remainder of the 2014–15 season.

On 3 January 2017, Storie agreed a loan move to St Mirren, starting on 8 January, until the end of the 2016–17 season.

Storie left Aberdeen on 17 January 2018.

=== Brechin City ===
In February 2018, Storie signed a short-term contract with Brechin City.

== Career statistics ==
As of 17 April 2017

Club	Season	League		Scottish Cup		League Cup		Other		Total	
Club	Season	Apps	Goals	Apps	Goals	Apps	Goals	Apps	Goals	Apps	Goals
Aberdeen	2012–13	1	0	0	0	0	0	—	—	1	0
Aberdeen	2013–14	1	0	0	0	0	0	–	–	1	0
Aberdeen	2014–15	0	0	0	0	0	0	0	0	0	0
Aberdeen	2015–16	10	0	0	0	0	0	0	0	10	0
Aberdeen	2016–17	2	0	0	0	0	0	0	0	2	0
Aberdeen	2017–18	0	0	0	0	0	0	0	0	0	0
Aberdeen	Total	14	0	0	0	0	0	0	0	14	0
Forfar Athletic (loan)	2013–14	4	0	0	0	0	0	0	0	4	0
Brechin City (loan)	2014–15	9	0	1	0	0	0	0	0	10	0
St Mirren (loan)	2016–17	7	0	3	0	0	0	1	0	11	0
Career total		34	0	4	0	0	0	1	0	39	0
