= Billy O'Brien (footballer) =

Footballer (born 1995)

Personal information
- Full name: Billy Thomas O'Brien
- Date of birth: 21 November 1995 (age 30)
- Place of birth: Bury, England
- Position: Goalkeeper

Youth career
- 2006–2014: Manchester City F.C

Senior career*
| Years | Team | Apps | (Gls) |
| 2014–2017 | Manchester City F.C | 0 | (0) |
| 2014 | → Hyde (loan) | 13 | (0) |
| 2017 | → St Mirren (loan) | 15 | (0) |
| 2017 | Macclesfield Town | 3 | (0) |
| Total | | 30 | (0) |

International career
| 2013–2014 | Wales U19 | 2 | (0) |
| 2015–20?? | Wales U21 | 8 | (0) |
- * Club domestic league appearances and goals

Billy O'Brien (born 21 November 1995) is a former professional footballer who played as a goalkeeper. Born in England, he played for Wales at youth level internationally. He retired from football to become a Royal Marine Commando in 2017.

== Club career ==
O'Brien, a fan of Manchester City, joined the team in 2006 after having taken part in trials with both them and Manchester United. At the club, he played for their youth teams and took part in competitions such as the UEFA Youth League before signing a professional contract with Manchester City in July 2014.

He spent the first half of the 2014–15 season on loan at Hyde United, debuting for the club in a defeat to Hednesford Town. In the latter half of 2016, O'Brien played in the Premier League 2 as part of Manchester City's squad and was also selected by manager Pep Guardiola to travel with the first team on a number of occasions including as a backup keeper against Celtic in the Champions League. O'Brien went on loan until the end of the season to St Mirren in January 2017. He became a regular starter for the club, keeping a clean sheet on his debut against Dundee and playing in the final of the Scottish Challenge Cup.

O'Brien revealed he would leave City after his contract expired in June 2017. He joined Macclesfield Town that summer, and made his debut as a substitute in a 0–0 draw against Bromley.

== International career ==
O'Brien played in two matches of the Wales U19 team's attempt to qualify for the 2014 UEFA European Under-19 Championship in 2013 and 2014. By 2015, O'Brien had moved up to the Wales U21 squad, playing for them in eight games of their campaign to qualify for the 2017 UEFA European Under-21 Championship. O'Brien made 15 saves while conceding 10 goals throughout all eight games.

== Career statistics ==
Appearances and goals by club, season and competition
| Club | Season | League | | National cup | | League cup | | Other | | Total | |
| Club | Season | Apps | Goals | Apps | Goals | Apps | Goals | Apps | Goals | Apps | Goals |
|---|---|---|---|---|---|---|---|---|---|---|---|
| Hyde United (loan) | 2014–15 | 13 | 0 | 0 | 0 | 0 | 0 | 0 | 0 | 13 | 0 |
| St Mirren (loan) | 2016–17 | 15 | 0 | 3 | 0 | 0 | 0 | 2 | 0 | 20 | 0 |
| Nod | 2017–18 | 2 | 0 | 0 | 0 | 0 | 0 | 0 | 0 | 2 | 0 |
| Career total | | 30 | 0 | 3 | 0 | 0 | 0 | 2 | 0 | 35 | 0 |

== Honours ==
St Mirren

- Scottish Challenge Cup runner-up: 2016–17
