= Essential English Library =

The Essential English Library is a series of books, some fiction and some non-fiction, intended mainly for foreign students, though it is hoped that English readers may also find them of interest. The fiction has been chosen from some of the best writers, old and new, of English novels, short stories and plays. The non-fiction consists of completely new books specially written for this series, on various aspects of English life and institutions.

The books are meant for serious adult students, and, though the vocabulary is carefully controlled, the style is natural and vigorous, and there is no question of any childish "writing down." The vocabulary is fundamentally that of the four books of Essential English. But, to widen the students' knowledge of the language, the same principle has been adopted in this series as in the later books of Essential English. So a number of new words (averaging three or four to a page) occur in each volume, but every new word is given, with the phonetic transcription, in the Glossary at the end of the book, and each word in the Glossary is defined within the vocabulary of Essential English.

All the books are about the same length, and are illustrated with photographs or line drawings.

English teacher Charles Ewart Eckersley wrote Essential English for Foreign Students, volumes 1-4, which were published by Longmans, Green and Co.
