= 2013–14 Aberdeen F.C. season =

Aberdeen
2013–14 season
- Chairman: Stewart Milne
- Manager: Derek McInnes
- Stadium: Pittodrie Stadium
- Premiership: 3rd
- League Cup: Winners
- Scottish Cup: Semi-final (lost to St Johnstone)
- Top goalscorer: League: Niall McGinn (12); All: Niall McGinn (13)
- Highest home attendance: 20,017 vs. Celtic, Premiership, 17 August 2013
- Lowest home attendance: 4,897 vs. Alloa Athletic, League Cup, 27 August 2013
- Average home league attendance: League: 12,394
| Home colours | Away colours |

The 2013–14 season was Aberdeen's 101st season in the top flight of Scottish football. Aberdeen competed in the Scottish Premiership, Scottish Cup and Scottish League Cup. They won the Scottish League Cup in March 2014 with a win on penalties after a 0–0 draw against Inverness CT and reached the semi-final of the Scottish Cup. In the league, they finished in third place behind Celtic and Motherwell, qualifying for Europe for the first time since 2009.

== Results and fixtures ==
Win Draw Loss

=== Friendly matches ===
Aberdeen played eight friendly matches; seven took place in pre-season and one in September.

| 9 July 2013 Friendly | Buckie Thistle | 0–3 | Aberdeen | Buckie |
| 19:45 | | 2212158 3233258 Report | Low 37'; Magennis 49'; McGinn 87' | Stadium: Victoria Park |

| 13 July 2013 Friendly | Huntly | 1–4 | Aberdeen | Huntly |
| 15:05 | Guild 61' (pen.) | 2212158 3236874 Report | McGinn 3', 23', 59'; Vernon 39' | Stadium: Christie Park |

| 16 July 2013 Friendly | UCD | 0–4 | Aberdeen | Dublin |
| 19:45 | | 2212158 3240175 Report | Magennis 5'; Hayes 35'; McGinn 46'; Pawlett 87' | Stadium: UCD Bowl; Attendance: 278 |

| 18 July 2013 Friendly | Malahide United | 1–4 | Aberdeen | Malahide |
| 19:30 | Shane Dunn 3' | 2212158 3321464 Report | Masson 36'; Vernon 42', 49' (pen.); Low 87' | Stadium: Gannon Park |

| 20 July 2013 Friendly | Shelbourne | 1–2 | Aberdeen | Drumcondra |
| 15:00 | Donnelly 34' | 2212158 3322983 Report | McGinn 70', 75' | Stadium: Tolka Park |

| 23 July 2013 Friendly | Peterhead | 3–2 | Aberdeen | Peterhead |
| 19:30 | McAllister 24' (pen.); Brown 33', 36' | 2212158 3325611 Report | Robson 40'; McGinn 73' (pen.) | Stadium: Balmoor Stadium; Attendance: 1,901 |

| 26 July 2013 Friendly | Aberdeen | 2–0 | FC Twente | Aberdeen |
| 19:30 | McGinn 50'; Pawlett 60' | 2212158 3328662 Report | | Stadium: Pittodrie Stadium; Attendance: 7,336 |

| 4 September 2013 Energy Cities Community Cup | Aberdeen | 3–2 | Viking FK | Aberdeen |
| 19:00 | Hector 38'; Storie 59'; Campanile 89' | 2212158 3448326 AFC | Olsen 43'; Sulimani 52' | Stadium: Pittodrie Stadium; Attendance: 10,017 |

=== Scottish Premiership ===
| 3 August 2013 Scottish Premiership | Aberdeen | 2–1 | Kilmarnock | Aberdeen |
| 15:00 | Hayes 20'; Flood 53' | BBC Report | Boyd 64' | Stadium: Pittodrie Stadium; Attendance: 13,149; Referee: Allan |

| 11 August 2013 Scottish Premiership | Motherwell | 1–3 | Aberdeen | Motherwell |
| 15:00 | Anier 1' | BBC Report | McGinn 62' (pen.), 84' (pen.); Reynolds 76' | Stadium: Fir Park; Attendance: 6,242; Referee: Beaton |

| 17 August 2013 Scottish Premiership | Aberdeen | 0–2 | Celtic | Aberdeen |
| 15:00 | | BBC Report | Commons 45' (pen.); Forrest 87' | Stadium: Pittodrie Stadium; Attendance: 20,017; Referee: Murray |

| 24 August 2013 Scottish Premiership | Heart of Midlothian | 2–1 | Aberdeen | Edinburgh |
| 15:00 | Walker 18'; McGhee 88' | BBC Report | McGinn 68' (pen.) | Stadium: Tynecastle Stadium; Attendance: 15,218; Referee: Muir |

| 31 August 2013 Scottish Premiership | Aberdeen | 0–0 | St Johnstone | Aberdeen |
| 15:00 | | BBC Report; Aberdeen Report | | Stadium: Pittodrie Stadium; Attendance: 9,478; Referee: McLean |

| 14 September 2013 Scottish Premiership | Partick Thistle | 0–3 | Aberdeen | Glasgow |
| 15:00 | | BBC Report | Zola 13'; Pawlett 20'; Magennis 70' | Stadium: Firhill Stadium; Attendance: 6,193; Referee: Beaton |

| 21 September 2013 Scottish Premiership | Aberdeen | 1–0 | Inverness Caledonian Thistle | Aberdeen |
| 15:00 | Vernon 81' | BBC Report | | Stadium: Pittodrie Stadium; Attendance: 11,251; Referee: Thomson |

| 30 September 2013 Scottish Premiership | St Mirren | 1–1 | Aberdeen | Paisley |
| 19:45 | Thompson 54' | BBC Report | Pawlett 85' | Stadium: St Mirren Park; Attendance: 4,051; Referee: Murray |

| 5 October 2013 Scottish Premiership | Ross County | 1–0 | Aberdeen | Dingwall |
| 15:00 | Quinn 52' | BBC Report | | Stadium: Victoria Park; Attendance: 5,290; Referee: Allan |

| 19 October 2013 Scottish Premiership | Aberdeen | 1–0 | Dundee United | Aberdeen |
| 15:00 | Zola 54' | BBC Report | | Stadium: Pittodrie Stadium; Attendance: 12,654; Referee: Madden |

| 26 October 2013 Scottish Premiership | Hibernian | 0–2 | Aberdeen | Edinburgh |
| 15:00 | | BBC Report | Vernon 80'; Wylde 90' | Stadium: Easter Road; Attendance: 12,810; Referee: McLean |

| 4 November 2013 Scottish Premiership | Aberdeen | 4–0 | Partick Thistle | Aberdeen |
| 15:00 | McGinn 25', 87'; Zola 40'; Hector 64' | BBC Report | | Stadium: Pittodrie Stadium; Attendance: 10,057; Referee: Colvin |

| 9 November 2013 Scottish Premiership | Aberdeen | 1–3 | Heart of Midlothian | Aberdeen |
| 15:00 | McGinn 26' | BBC Report | Walker 66'; Paterson 74'; Stevenson 90+3' | Stadium: Pittodrie Stadium; Attendance: 13,940; Referee: Brines |

| 23 November 2013 Scottish Premiership | Celtic | 3–1 | Aberdeen | Glasgow |
| 15:00 | Commons 36', 90+3'; Boerrigter 90+1' | BBC Report | McGinn 45' | Stadium: Celtic Park; Attendance: 49,683; Referee: Thomson |

| 7 December 2013 Scottish Premiership | St Johnstone | 0–2 | Aberdeen | Perth |
| 15:00 | | BBC Report | Pawlett 17'; McGinn 85' | Stadium: McDiarmid Park; Attendance: 4,741; Referee: Collum |

| 14 December 2013 Scottish Premiership | Aberdeen | 2–0 | St Mirren | Aberdeen |
| 15:00 | Vernon 20'; Robson 66' | BBC Report | | Stadium: Pittodrie Stadium; Attendance: 9,332; Referee: Thomson |

| 21 December 2013 Scottish Premiership | Inverness Caledonian Thistle | 3–4 | Aberdeen | Inverness |
| 17:30 | McKay 47' (pen.), 57'; Shinnie 90' | BBC Report | Robson 22' (pen.), 32'; Pawett 66'; McGinn 44' | Stadium: Caledonian Stadium; Attendance: 4,810; Referee: McLean |

| 26 December 2013 Scottish Premiership | Aberdeen | 0–1 | Motherwell | Aberdeen |
| 15:00 | | BBC Report | Ainsworth 49' | Stadium: Pittodrie Stadium; Attendance: 12,494; Referee: Clancy |

| 29 December 2013 Scottish Premiership | Aberdeen | 1–0 | Ross County | Aberdeen |
| 15:00 | Low 2' | BBC Report | | Stadium: Pittodrie Stadium; Attendance: 11,602; Referee: Murray |

| 1 January 2014 Scottish Premiership | Dundee United | 1–2 | Aberdeen | Dundee |
| 15:00 | Souttar 51' | BBC Report | Robson 64' (pen.); Pawlett 90' | Stadium: Tannadice Park; Attendance: 12,601; Referee: Collum |

| 5 January 2014 Scottish Premiership | Kilmarnock | 0–1 | Aberdeen | Kilmarnock |
| 15:00 | | BBC Report | Reynolds 83' | Stadium: Rugby Park; Attendance: 4,073; Referee: Charleston |

| 10 January 2014 Scottish Premiership | Aberdeen | 1–0 | Hibernian | Aberdeen |
| 19:45 | Flood 87' | BBC Report | | Stadium: Pittodrie Stadium; Attendance: 12.734; Referee: Thomson |

| 18 January 2014 Scottish Premiership | Aberdeen | 0–1 | Inverness Caledonian Thistle | Aberdeen |
| 15:00 | | BBC Report | Williams 22' | Stadium: Pittodrie Stadium; Attendance: 12,021; Referee: Brines |

| 25 January 2014 Scottish Premiership | Motherwell | 2–2 | Aberdeen | Motherwell |
| 15:00 | McManus 47'; Francis-Angol 69' | BBC Report | Rooney 67'; Anderson 94' | Stadium: Fir Park; Attendance: 5,756; Referee: McLean |

| 15 February 2014 Scottish Premiership | St Mirren | 0–1 | Aberdeen | Paisley |
| 15:00 | | BBC Report | Rooney 80' (pen.) | Stadium: St Mirren Park; Attendance: 4,073; Referee: Murray |

| 22 February 2014 Scottish Premiership | Partick Thistle | 3–1 | Aberdeen | Glasgow |
| 15:00 | Balatoni 59'; Taylor 64', 72' | BBC Report | Rooney 66' | Stadium: Firhill Stadium; Attendance: 4,554; Referee: Muir |

| 25 February 2014 Scottish Premiership | Aberdeen | 2–1 | Celtic | Aberdeen |
| 19:45 | Hayes 41'; Rooney 45' | BBC Report | Forrest 62' | Stadium: Pittodrie Stadium; Attendance: 16,634; Referee: Thomson |

| 1 March 2014 Scottish Premiership | Aberdeen | 1–0 | St Johnstone | Aberdeen |
| 15:00 | Jack 8' | BBC Report | | Stadium: Pittodrie Stadium; Attendance: 11,487; Referee: Collum |

| 22 March 2014 Scottish Premiership | Aberdeen | 2–1 | Kilmarnock | Aberdeen |
| 15:00 | Rooney 17'; Jack 72' | BBC Report | Boyd 11' | Stadium: Pittodrie Stadium; Attendance: 17,029; Referee: Thomson |

| 25 March 2014 Scottish Premiership | Ross County | 1–1 | Aberdeen | Dingwall |
| 19:45 | de Leeuw 35' | BBC Report | Rooney 77' | Stadium: Global Energy Stadium; Attendance: 3,775; Referee: Colvin |

| 29 March 2014 Scottish Premiership | Aberdeen | 1–1 | Dundee United | Aberdeen |
| 15:00 | McGinn 52' | BBC Report | Paton 6' | Stadium: Pittodrie Stadium; Attendance: 14,627; Referee: Murray |

| 2 April 2014 Scottish Premiership | Heart of Midlothian | 1–1 | Aberdeen | Edinburgh |
| 19:45 | Hamill 87' (pen.) | BBC Report | Flood 74' | Stadium: Tynecastle Stadium; Attendance: 13,913; Referee: Clancy |

| 7 April 2014 Scottish Premiership | Hibernian | 0–2 | Aberdeen | Edinburgh |
| 19:45 | | BBC Report | McGinn 14', 62' | Stadium: Easter Road; Attendance: 9,321; Referee: Madden |

| 18 April 2014 Scottish Premiership | Inverness Caledonian Thistle | 0–0 | Aberdeen | Inverness |
| 19:45 | | BBC Report | | Stadium: Caledonian Stadium; Attendance: 4,224; Referee: Madden |

| 26 April 2014 Scottish Premiership | Aberdeen | 1–1 | St Johnstone | Aberdeen |
| 15:00 | Rooney 31' | BBC Report | May 8' | Stadium: Pittodrie Stadium; Attendance: 10,003; Referee: Muir |

| 3 May 2014 Scottish Premiership | Celtic | 5–2 | Aberdeen | Glasgow |
| 15:00 | Brown 25', 44'; Stokes 53'; Commons 69', 87' | BBC Report | McGinn 28'; Logan 56' | Stadium: Celtic Park; Attendance: 47,468; Referee: Brines |

| 6 May 2014 Scottish Premiership | Dundee United | 1–3 | Aberdeen | Dundee |
| 19:45 | Dillon 34' | BBC Report | Vernon 7', 55', 76' | Stadium: Tannadice Park; Attendance: 8,677; Referee: Murray |

| 11 May 2014 Scottish Premiership | Aberdeen | 0–1 | Motherwell | Aberdeen |
| 12:15 | | BBC Report | Reid 90' | Stadium: Pittodrie Stadium; Attendance: 17,016; Referee: McLean |

=== Scottish League Cup ===
Aberdeen entered the Scottish League Cup in the second round stage, having not qualified for Europe in 2012–13. They won the trophy on 16 March 2014 on penalties after a 0–0 draw with Inverness CT.

| 27 August 2013 Second round | Aberdeen | 0–0 (6–5 p) | Alloa Athletic | Aberdeen |
| 19:45 | | Report | | Stadium: Pittodrie Stadium; Attendance: 4,897; Referee: Stevie O'Reilly |
| | Penalties |
| | McGinn (penalty scored); Low (penalty scored); Pawlett (penalty scored); Jack (penalty scored); Vernon (penalty scored); Reynolds (penalty scored) | | (penalty scored) Holmes; (penalty scored) Ferns; (penalty scored) McCord; (penalty scored) Gordon; (penalty scored) Young; (penalty missed) Doyle |

| 25 September 2013 Third round | Falkirk | 0–5 | Aberdeen | Falkirk |
| 19:15 | | Report | Shaughnessy 23'; Smith 36'; Vernon 54', 55', 75' (pen.) | Stadium: Falkirk Stadium; Attendance: 2,838; Referee: Steven McLean |

| 30 October 2013 Quarter-final | Motherwell | 0–2 | Aberdeen | Motherwell |
| 19:45 | | Report | Considine 83'; Hayes 90' | Stadium: Fir Park; Attendance: 6,995; Referee: John Beaton |

| 1 February 2014 Semi-final | Aberdeen | 4–0 | St Johnstone | Edinburgh |
| 15:00 | Hayes 3', 79'; Pawlett 32'; Rooney 63' | BBC Sport | | Stadium: Tynecastle Stadium; Attendance: 16,761; Referee: Bobby Madden |

| 16 March 2014 Final | Aberdeen | 0–0 (4–2 p) | Inverness Caledonian Thistle | Glasgow |
| 14:30 | | BBC Sport | | Stadium: Celtic Park; Attendance: 51,143; Referee: Steven McLean |
| | Penalties |
| | Robson (penalty scored); Low (penalty scored); Vernon (penalty scored); Rooney (penalty scored) | | (penalty missed) McKay; (penalty missed) Tansey; (penalty scored) Ross; (penalty scored) Doran |

=== Scottish Cup ===
Aberdeen entered the Scottish Cup in the fourth round stage.

| 1 December 2013 Fourth round | Partick Thistle | 0–1 | Aberdeen | Glasgow |
| 12:45 | | Report | Considine 5' | Stadium: Firhill Stadium; Attendance: 3,642; Referee: Bobby Madden |

| 8 February 2014 Fifth round | Celtic | 1–2 | Aberdeen | Glasgow |
| 12:45 | Stokes 9' | BBC Sport | Anderson 38'; Pawlett 50' | Stadium: Celtic Park; Attendance: 30,413; Referee: Willie Collum |

| 8 March 2014 Quarter-finals | Aberdeen | 1–0 | Dumbarton | Aberdeen |
| 15:00 | Rooney 53' | BBC Sport | | Stadium: Pittodrie Stadium; Attendance: 10,600; Referee: Kevin Clancy |

| 13 April 2014 Semi-finals | St Johnstone | 2–1 | Aberdeen | Glasgow |
| 12:45 | May 61'; May 84' | BBC Sport | McGinn 15' | Stadium: Ibrox Stadium; Attendance: 19,057; Referee: William Collum |

== Statistics ==
=== Appearances and goals ===
Last updated 11 May 2014

| No. | Pos | Nat | Player | Total | | Premiership | | League Cup | | Scottish Cup | |
| No. | Pos | Nat | Player | Apps | Goals | Apps | Goals | Apps | Goals | Apps | Goals |
|---|---|---|---|---|---|---|---|---|---|---|---|
| 1 | GK | (Scotland) SCO | Jamie Langfield | 46 | 0 | 37+0 | 0 | 5+0 | 0 | 4+0 | 0 |
| 2 | DF | (Republic of Ireland) IRL | Joe Shaughnessy | 29 | 1 | 20+6 | 0 | 2+0 | 1 | 0+1 | 0 |
| 3 | DF | (Scotland) SCO | Clark Robertson | 11 | 0 | 5+3 | 0 | 3+0 | 0 | 0+0 | 0 |
| 4 | DF | (Scotland) SCO | Russell Anderson (c) | 38 | 2 | 27+3 | 1 | 4+0 | 0 | 4+0 | 1 |
| 5 | DF | (Scotland) SCO | Andrew Considine | 28 | 2 | 21+0 | 0 | 2+1 | 1 | 4+0 | 1 |
| 6 | DF | (Scotland) SCO | Mark Reynolds | 46 | 2 | 37+0 | 2 | 5+0 | 0 | 4+0 | 0 |
| 7 | FW | (Democratic Republic of the Congo) COD | Calvin Zola | 24 | 3 | 11+9 | 3 | 3+0 | 0 | 1+0 | 0 |
| 8 | MF | (Republic of Ireland) IRL | Willo Flood | 40 | 3 | 31+2 | 3 | 4+0 | 0 | 3+0 | 0 |
| 9 | FW | (England) ENG | Scott Vernon | 34 | 9 | 14+11 | 6 | 0+5 | 3 | 0+4 | 0 |
| 10 | FW | (Northern Ireland) NIR | Niall McGinn | 44 | 14 | 35+1 | 13 | 4+0 | 0 | 3+1 | 1 |
| 11 | MF | (Republic of Ireland) IRL | Jonny Hayes | 38 | 5 | 28+3 | 2 | 5+0 | 3 | 2+0 | 0 |
| 14 | FW | (Scotland) SCO | Cammy Smith | 22 | 1 | 8+10 | 0 | 1+1 | 1 | 1+1 | 0 |
| 15 | MF | (Scotland) SCO | Barry Robson | 35 | 4 | 20+8 | 4 | 2+1 | 0 | 4+0 | 0 |
| 16 | MF | (Scotland) SCO | Peter Pawlett | 42 | 7 | 33+2 | 5 | 4+0 | 1 | 3+0 | 1 |
| 17 | MF | (Scotland) SCO | Gregg Wylde | 10 | 1 | 3+5 | 1 | 0+1 | 0 | 1+0 | 0 |
| 17 | FW | (Republic of Ireland) IRL | Adam Rooney | 17 | 9 | 13+0 | 7 | 2+0 | 1 | 2+0 | 1 |
| 18 | DF | (Scotland) SCO | Nicky Low | 17 | 1 | 3+9 | 1 | 1+3 | 0 | 0+1 | 0 |
| 19 | MF | (Scotland) SCO | Chris Clark | 0 | 0 | 0+0 | 0 | 0+0 | 0 | 0+0 | 0 |
| 20 | GK | (England) ENG | Nicky Weaver | 2 | 0 | 1+1 | 0 | 0+0 | 0 | 0+0 | 0 |
| 21 | FW | (Northern Ireland) NIR | Josh Magennis | 20 | 1 | 1+17 | 1 | 0+1 | 0 | 0+1 | 0 |
| 22 | MF | (Scotland) SCO | Ryan Jack | 41 | 2 | 34+0 | 2 | 4+0 | 0 | 3+0 | 0 |
| 23 | MF | (Scotland) SCO | Jamie Masson | 0 | 0 | 0+0 | 0 | 0+0 | 0 | 0+0 | 0 |
| 24 | FW | (Scotland) SCO | Declan McManus | 3 | 0 | 0+3 | 0 | 0+0 | 0 | 0+0 | 0 |
| 25 | FW | (Scotland) SCO | Lawrence Shankland | 0 | 0 | 0+0 | 0 | 0+0 | 0 | 0+0 | 0 |
| 26 | MF | (Scotland) SCO | Craig Storie | 1 | 0 | 0+1 | 0 | 0+0 | 0 | 0+0 | 0 |
| 27 | DF | (Jamaica) JAM | Michael Hector | 22 | 1 | 18+2 | 1 | 1+0 | 0 | 1+0 | 0 |
| 28 | DF | (England) ENG | Alan Tate | 8 | 0 | 5+2 | 0 | 0+1 | 0 | 0+0 | 0 |
| 29 | DF | (England) ENG | Shay Logan | 18 | 1 | 13+0 | 1 | 2+0 | 0 | 3+0 | 0 |
| 30 | GK | (Republic of Ireland) IRL | Danny Rogers | 0 | 0 | 0+0 | 0 | 0+0 | 0 | 0+0 | 0 |
| 35 | DF | (Scotland) SCO | Craig Murray | 4 | 0 | 0+2 | 0 | 1+1 | 0 | 0+0 | 0 |

=== Disciplinary record ===
Last updated 11 May 2014

| No. | Nat. | Pos. | Name | Premiership | | League Cup | | Scottish Cup | | Total | |
| No. | Nat. | Pos. | Name | Yellow card | Red card | Yellow card | Red card | Yellow card | Red card | Yellow card | Red card |
| 1 | (Scotland) | MF | Jamie Langfield | 1 | 1 | 0 | 0 | 0 | 0 | 1 | 1 |
| 2 | (Scotland) | DF | Joe Shaughnessy | 3 | 0 | 0 | 1 | 0 | 0 | 3 | 1 |
| 3 | (Scotland) | MF | Clark Robertson | 1 | 0 | 1 | 0 | 0 | 0 | 2 | 0 |
| 4 | (Scotland) | DF | Russell Anderson | 6 | 0 | 2 | 0 | 0 | 0 | 8 | 0 |
| 5 | (Scotland) | DF | Andrew Considine | 4 | 1 | 1 | 0 | 0 | 0 | 5 | 1 |
| 7 | (Democratic Republic of the Congo) | MF | Calvin Zola | 1 | 0 | 1 | 0 | 0 | 0 | 2 | 0 |
| 8 | (Republic of Ireland) | MF | Willo Flood | 4 | 0 | 0 | 0 | 0 | 0 | 4 | 0 |
| 9 | (England) | FW | Scott Vernon | 2 | 0 | 0 | 0 | 0 | 0 | 2 | 0 |
| 10 | (Northern Ireland) | MF | Niall McGinn | 1 | 0 | 0 | 0 | 0 | 0 | 1 | 0 |
| 11 | (Republic of Ireland) | MF | Jonny Hayes | 5 | 0 | 0 | 0 | 1 | 0 | 6 | 0 |
| 14 | (Scotland) | FW | Cammy Smith | 1 | 0 | 0 | 0 | 0 | 0 | 1 | 0 |
| 15 | (Scotland) | MF | Barry Robson | 3 | 1 | 1 | 0 | 0 | 0 | 4 | 1 |
| 16 | (Scotland) | MF | Peter Pawlett | 5 | 0 | 0 | 0 | 1 | 0 | 6 | 0 |
| 17 | (Republic of Ireland) | FW | Adam Rooney | 2 | 0 | 0 | 0 | 0 | 0 | 2 | 0 |
| 18 | (Scotland) | DF | Nicky Low | 1 | 1 | 0 | 0 | 0 | 0 | 1 | 1 |
| 21 | (Northern Ireland) | FW | Josh Magennis | 1 | 0 | 0 | 0 | 0 | 0 | 1 | 0 |
| 22 | (Scotland) | MF | Ryan Jack | 6 | 0 | 0 | 0 | 0 | 0 | 6 | 0 |
| 27 | (Jamaica) | DF | Michael Hector | 5 | 0 | 0 | 0 | 0 | 0 | 5 | 0 |

=== Goalscorers ===
Last updated 11 May 2014

| Rank | Player | Scottish Premiership | Scottish Cup | League Cup | Total |
|---|---|---|---|---|---|
| 1 | (Northern Ireland) Niall McGinn | 13 | 1 | 0 | 14 |
| 2 | (England) Scott Vernon | 6 | 0 | 3 | 9 |
| 2 | (Republic of Ireland) Adam Rooney | 7 | 1 | 1 | 9 |
| 4 | (Scotland) Peter Pawlett | 5 | 1 | 1 | 7 |
| 5 | (Republic of Ireland) Jonny Hayes | 2 | 0 | 3 | 5 |
| 6 | (Scotland) Barry Robson | 4 | 0 | 0 | 4 |
| 7 | (Republic of Ireland) Willo Flood | 3 | 0 | 0 | 3 |
| 7 | (Democratic Republic of the Congo) Calvin Zola | 3 | 0 | 0 | 3 |
| 9 | (Scotland) Ryan Jack | 2 | 0 | 0 | 2 |
| 9 | (Scotland) Mark Reynolds | 2 | 0 | 0 | 2 |
| 9 | (Scotland) Russell Anderson | 1 | 1 | 0 | 2 |
| 9 | (Scotland) Andrew Considine | 0 | 1 | 1 | 2 |
| 13. | (Jamaica) Michael Hector | 1 | 0 | 0 | 1 |
| 13. | (England) Shay Logan | 1 | 0 | 0 | 1 |
| 13. | (Scotland) Nicky Low | 1 | 0 | 0 | 1 |
| 13. | (Northern Ireland) Josh Magennis | 1 | 0 | 0 | 1 |
| 13. | (Scotland) Gregg Wylde | 1 | 0 | 0 | 1 |
| 13. | (Republic of Ireland) Joe Shaughnessy | 0 | 0 | 1 | 1 |
| 13. | (Scotland) Cammy Smith | 0 | 0 | 1 | 1 |

== League table ==
| Pos | Team | Pld | W | D | L | GF | GA | GD | Pts | Qualification or relegation |
|---|---|---|---|---|---|---|---|---|---|---|
| 1 | Celtic (C) | 38 | 31 | 6 | 1 | 102 | 25 | +77 | 99 | Qualification for the Champions League second qualifying round |
| 2 | Motherwell | 38 | 22 | 4 | 12 | 64 | 60 | +4 | 70 | Qualification for the Europa League second qualifying round |
| 3 | Aberdeen | 38 | 20 | 8 | 10 | 53 | 38 | +15 | 68 | Qualification for the Europa League first qualifying round |
| 4 | Dundee United | 38 | 16 | 10 | 12 | 65 | 50 | +15 | 58 | |
| 5 | Inverness Caledonian Thistle | 38 | 16 | 9 | 13 | 44 | 44 | 0 | 57 | |

Source: SPFL Archive
Rules for classification: 1) points; 2) goal difference; 3) number of goals scored.
(C) Champions

=== Results by round ===
| Round | 1 | 2 | 3 | 4 | 5 | 6 | 7 | 8 | 9 | 10 | 11 | 12 | 13 | 14 | 15 | 16 | 17 | 18 | 19 | 20 | 21 | 22 | 23 | 24 | 25 | 26 | 27 | 28 | 29 | 30 | 31 | 32 | 33 | 34 | 35 | 36 | 37 | 38 |
|---|---|---|---|---|---|---|---|---|---|---|---|---|---|---|---|---|---|---|---|---|---|---|---|---|---|---|---|---|---|---|---|---|---|---|---|---|---|---|
| Ground | H | A | H | A | H | A | H | A | A | H | A | H | H | A | A | H | A | H | H | A | A | H | H | A | A | A | H | H | H | A | H | A | A | A | H | A | A | H |
| Result | W | W | L | L | D | W | W | D | L | W | W | W | L | L | W | W | W | L | W | W | W | W | L | D | W | L | W | W | W | D | D | D | W | D | D | L | W | L |
| Position | 2 | 2 | 4 | 4 | 6 | 4 | 3 | 4 | 4 | 4 | 2 | 2 | 3 | 5 | 4 | 4 | 3 | 5 | 3 | 3 | 2 | 2 | 2 | 2 | 2 | 2 | 2 | 2 | 2 | 2 | 2 | 2 | 2 | 2 | 2 | 2 | 2 | 3 |

Updated to match(es) played on 11 May 2014. Source:
A = Away; H = Home; W = Win; D = Draw; L = Loss

=== Results by opponent ===
| Team | Results | | | | Points |
| Team | 1 | 2 | 3 | 4 | Points |
|---|---|---|---|---|---|
| Celtic | 0–2 | 1–3 | 2–1 | 2–5 | 3 |
| Dundee United | 1–0 | 2–1 | 2–2 | 3–1 | 10 |
| Heart of Midlothian | 1–2 | 1–3 | 1–1 | | 1 |
| Hibernian | 2–0 | 1–0 | 2–0 | | 9 |
| Inverness Caledonian Thistle | 1–0 | 4–3 | 0–1 | 0–0 | 7 |
| Kilmarnock | 2–1 | 1–0 | 2–1 | | 9 |
| Motherwell | 3–1 | 0–1 | 2–2 | 0–1 | 4 |
| Partick Thistle | 3–0 | 4–0 | 1–3 | | 6 |
| Ross County | 0–1 | 1–0 | 1–1 | | 4 |
| St Johnstone | 0–0 | 2–0 | 1–0 | 1–1 | 8 |
| St Mirren | 1–1 | 2–0 | 1–0 | | 7 |

Source: 2013–14 Scottish Premiership article

== Transfers ==
=== Players In ===
| Dates | Player | From | Fee | Source |
|---|---|---|---|---|
| 1 July 2013 | (Republic of Ireland) Willo Flood | (Scotland) Dundee United | Free | |
| 1 July 2013 | (Scotland) Barry Robson | (England) Sheffield United | Free | |
| 1 July 2013 | (Democratic Republic of the Congo) Calvin Zola | (England) Burton Albion | Free | |
| 1 July 2013 | (Scotland) Gregg Wylde | (England) Bolton Wanderers | Free | |
| 1 July 2013 | (Scotland) Lawrence Shankland | (Scotland) Queen's Park | Free | |
| 15 July 2013 | (England) Nicky Weaver | (England) Sheffield Wednesday | Free | |
| 26 July 2013 | (Jamaica) Michael Hector | (Scotland) Reading | Loan | |
| 5 January 2014 | (England) Alan Tate | (Wales) Swansea | Loan | |
| 23 January 2014 | (Republic of Ireland) Adam Rooney | (England) Oldham Athletic | Free | |
| 30 January 2014 | (England) Shaleum Logan | (England) Brentford | Loan | |

=== Players Out ===
| Dates | Player | To | Fee | Source |
|---|---|---|---|---|
| 1 July 2013 | (Scotland) Gavin Rae | (Scotland) Dundee | Free | |
| 1 July 2013 | (New Zealand) Rory Fallon | (Scotland) St Johnstone | Free | |
| 1 July 2013 | (Scotland) Mitch Megginson | (Scotland) Dumbarton | Free | |
| 1 July 2013 | (England) Rob Milsom | (England) Rotherham United | Free | |
| 1 July 2013 | (Scotland) Jordon Brown | (Scotland) Peterhead | Free | |
| 1 July 2013 | (England) Isaac Osbourne | (Scotland) Partick Thistle | Free | |
| 1 July 2013 | (Scotland) Gary Naysmith | (Scotland) East Fife | Free | |
| 1 July 2013 | (Czech Republic) Dan Twardzik | (Scotland) Dundee | Free | |
| 1 July 2013 | (Scotland) Stephen Hughes | (Scotland) East Fife | Free | |
| August 2013 | (Scotland) Scott Rumsby | (Scotland) Stranraer | Loan | |
| 7 November 2013 | (Scotland) Craig Storie | (Scotland) Forfar Athletic | Loan | |
| 13 December 2013 | (Republic of Ireland) Danny Rogers | (Scotland) Airdrieonians | Loan | |
| 8 January 2014 | (Scotland) Lawrence Shankland | (Scotland) Dunfermline Athletic | Loan | |
| 8 January 2014 | (Scotland) Jamie Masson | (Scotland) Elgin City | Loan | |
| 15 January 2014 | (Scotland) Gregg Wylde | (Scotland) St Mirren | Free | |
| 30 January 2014 | (Northern Ireland) Josh Magennis | (Scotland) St Mirren | Loan | |
| 4 February 2014 | (Scotland) Chris Clark | (Scotland) Cove Rangers | Free | |

== See also ==
- List of Aberdeen F.C. seasons
