= Kyle Magennis =

Scottish footballer (born 1998)

Personal information
- Date of birth: 26 August 1998 (age 28)
- Place of birth: Glasgow, Scotland
- Position: Midfielder

Team information
- Current team: Arbroath
- Number: 27

Youth career
- 2004–2016: St Mirren

Senior career*
Years	Team	Apps	(Gls)
2016–2020	St Mirren	88	(8)
2020–2023	Hibernian	34	(5)
2023–2026	Kilmarnock	26	(0)
2026–	Arbroath	0	(0)

International career^{‡}
2017	Scotland U20	4	(0)
2018–2019	Scotland U21	5	(0)
Medal record
Scotland
Toulon Tournament
Bronze medal – third place	2017 Toulon	U–20 Competition
- * Club domestic league appearances and goals as of 17 October 2026 ‡ National team caps and goals as of 16:17, 27 May 2023 (UTC)

Kyle Magennis (born 26 August 1998) is a Scottish professional footballer who plays as a midfielder for Scottish Championship club Arbroath. He has previously played for St Mirren and Hibernian, and also represented Scotland at under-17 and under-21 level.

== Club career ==
=== St Mirren ===
Born in Glasgow, Magennis attended Paisley Grammar School. Magennis joined St Mirren's youth academy at the age of five and remained there throughout his youth career until making his debut for the senior team against Hibernian in October 2016, aged 18, in the Scottish Championship. He continued to appear for the club throughout the season, scoring his first goal for the club in a narrow win over Queen of the South. Having impressed manager Jack Ross with his performances, he was offered a new contract with St Mirren in December 2016 which extended his contract with the club until summer 2019.

Now established as a first team player in the Saints squad, Magennis signed a new contract committing him to the club until the summer of 2020, and after clinching the 2017–18 Scottish Championship title, he further extended his contract with St Mirren to 2021. He was in the side which secured their status in the Scottish Premiership via the relegation playoff in May 2019.

Magennis and Saints suffered a major blow in January 2020, when he injured his knee during a 1–0 defeat to Rangers, ending his season after having appeared in every match of the campaign until suffering the injury. In September 2020, St Mirren stated they had rejected a "substantial" offer for Magennis from Hibernian. A few days later another offer from the same club was accepted.

=== Hibernian ===
Magennis signed a five-year deal with Hibernian on 5 October 2020.

On 1 August 2021, Magennis scored Hibernian's opening Scottish Premiership goal for the 2021–22 season against Motherwell which ended in a 3–2 victory for Hibs. Magennis had a good start to the 2021–22 season, but then missed most of it due to groin and knee injuries.

After he suffered from more injury problems during the 2022–23 season, Magennis was allowed to leave Hibs in June 2023.

=== Kilmarnock ===
Following his release by Hibs, Magennis signed a two-year contract with Kilmarnock on 21 June 2023.

Magennis signed a new one-year contract with Kilmarnock in July 2025.

=== Arbroath ===
On 11 September 2026, Magennis signed for Scottish Championship side Arbroath.

== International career ==
Magennis was selected for the Scotland under-20 squad in the 2017 Toulon Tournament, in which they won the bronze medal. It was the nation's first ever medal at the competition. He then played for the Scotland under-21 team, making his debut in a 2–1 win against the Netherlands in September 2018.

== Career statistics ==
As of 16:17, 27 May 2023 (UTC)

Appearances and goals by club, season and competition
Club	Season	League			Scottish Cup		League Cup		Other		Total	
Club	Season	Division	Apps	Goals	Apps	Goals	Apps	Goals	Apps	Goals	Apps	Goals
St Mirren	2016–17	Scottish Championship	25	3	4	0	0	0	3 (Note: Appearances in the Scottish Challenge Cup)	0	32	3
St Mirren	2017–18	Scottish Championship	27	2	2	0	0	0	0	0	29	2
St Mirren	2018–19	Scottish Premiership	14	2	0	0	3	0	2 (Note: Two appearances in the Scottish Premiership play-offs)	0	19	2
St Mirren	2019–20	Scottish Premiership	22	1	1	0	4	0	0	0	27	1
St Mirren	2020–21	Scottish Premiership	0	0	0	0	0	0	0	0	0	0
Total			88	8	7	0	7	0	5	0	107	8
Hibernian	2020–21	Scottish Premiership	14	1	4 (Note: One appearance in the previous season's Scottish Cup which was rescheduled to October due to COVID-19)	0	5	0	0	0	23	1
Hibernian	2021–22	Scottish Premiership	7	2	0	0	2	1	4 (Note: Appearances in the UEFA Conference League)	1	13	4
Hibernian	2022–23	Scottish Premiership	13	2	0	0	0	0	0	0	13	2
Hibernian	Total		34	5	4	0	7	1	4	1	49	7
Career total			122	13	11	0	14	1	9	1	156	15
