= Ralston Training Complex =

Football training centre in Paisley, Scotland

Coordinates: 55.8443°N 4.3748°W

Ralston, officially the St Mirren Training Ground, is St Mirren F.C.'s training centre, located at Ralston, Paisley, in Scotland. The complex houses the club's training and youth facilities. The complex is signposted off Glasgow Road, Paisley (A761), and sits beside Ralston Community Centre off Bathgo Avenue. The postcode for the complex is PA1 3EA.

== Information ==
The training ground is based at Allanton playing fields in Ralston. The 3.7-hectare site has an astroturf pitch, a grass playing area to SPL standard for the first team to train on and the first team headquarters, including a dressing room, physio room and boot room. The development also features meeting rooms, a media suite and an analysis room, as well as offices for the manager and other staff, a gym, the players’ lounge and restaurant and the youth academy headquarters. The complex cost around one million pounds to create and is completely owned by St Mirren F.C.

== Controversy ==
When plans to create the complex were announced, several people in Ralston opposed the move and launched an action group against it. They believed they would be affected with car parking, floodlights, foul language, loss of privacy and excess traffic. The group failed in their actions and the ground was completed in 2009.
