= Jordan Stewart (footballer, born 1996) =

Scottish footballer

Personal information
- Date of birth: 5 March 1996 (age 30)
- Place of birth: Scotland
- Position: Midfielder

Youth career
- St Mirren

Senior career*
Years	Team	Apps	(Gls)
2015–2017	St Mirren	17	(0)
2017	→ Annan Athletic (loan)	9	(1)
2017–2019	Clyde	42	(1)
2019–2020	Albion Rovers	7	(0)
- * Club domestic league appearances and goals as of 00:21, 27 June 2019 (UTC)

Jordan Stewart (born 5 March 1996) is a Scottish footballer who plays as a midfielder. He has also played for St Mirren, Annan Athletic and Clyde.

== Career ==
=== St Mirren ===
Stewart began his career at St Mirren. He was an unused substitute for one of their 2013–14 Scottish Premiership matches, a goalless home draw with Hibernian on 23 November 2013. He made his debut on 23 May 2015, playing 14 minutes as a substitute for Jeroen Tesselaar at the end of a 1–0 defeat at Hamilton Academical.

On 18 August 2015 he started a game for the first time, in the second round of the Scottish Challenge Cup, and scored the equaliser as his team came from behind to win 2–1 at Annan Athletic. A week later in the second round of the Scottish League Cup, he was taken off in a stretcher after a challenge from Livingston's Danny Mullen which resulted in his dismissal; St Mirren lost the game 2–3 at home.

In May 2016, Stewart graduated from the club's academy by signing a one-year professional contract. He moved on loan to Annan Athletic in January 2017. He was released by St Mirren at the end of his contract in May 2017.

=== Clyde ===
In June 2017, Stewart signed a one-year contract with Scottish League Two side Clyde. Stewart extended his contractor for a further year in May 2018, having made over thirty appearances for the club. After helping the club gain promotion to Scottish League One, Stewart's contract was not renewed.

=== Albion Rovers ===
On 29 May 2019, Stewart signed for Albion Rovers.

== Career statistics ==
As of 27 June 2019

Appearances and goals by club, season and competition
Club	Season	League			Scottish Cup		League Cup		Other		Total	
Club	Season	Division	Apps	Goals	Apps	Goals	Apps	Goals	Apps	Goals	Apps	Goals
St Mirren	2014–15	Scottish Premiership	1	0	0	0	0	0	—		1	0
St Mirren	2015–16	Scottish Championship	13	0	1	0	1	0	3 (Note: Appearances in the Scottish Challenge Cup)	1	18	1
St Mirren	2016–17	Scottish Championship	3	0	0	0	2	0	2	0	7	0
St Mirren	Total		17	0	1	0	3	0	5	1	26	1
Annan Athletic (loan)	2016–17	Scottish League Two	9	1	0	0	0	0	1 (Note: Appearance in the League One play-offs)	0	10	1
Clyde	2017–18	Scottish League Two	28	1	2	0	2	0	1	0	33	1
Clyde	2018–19	Scottish League Two	14	0	0	0	3	0	2 (Note: One appearance in the League One play-offs and one appearance in the Scottish Challenge Cup)	0	19	0
Clyde	Total		42	1	2	0	5	0	3	0	52	1
Albion Rovers	2019–20	Scottish League Two	0	0	0	0	0	0	0	0	0	0
Career total			68	2	3	0	8	0	9	1	88	3
