= Adam Eckersley =

English footballer (born 1985)

Personal information
- Full name: Adam James Eckersley
- Date of birth: 7 September 1985 (age 41)
- Place of birth: Worsley, England
- Height: 5 ft 9 in (1.75 m)
- Position: Left-back

Youth career
- 2002–2004: Manchester United

Senior career*
Years	Team	Apps	(Gls)
2004–2008	Manchester United	0	(0)
2006	→ Royal Antwerp (loan)	16	(1)
2006	→ Brøndby (loan)	4	(0)
2007	→ Barnsley (loan)	6	(0)
2007	→ Port Vale (loan)	2	(0)
2008	Port Vale	16	(1)
2008–2010	Horsens	40	(2)
2010–2014	AGF Aarhus	85	(13)
2014–2015	Hearts	24	(2)
2015–2016	Hibernian	0	(0)
2016–2017	FC Edmonton	24	(0)
2017–2019	St Mirren	36	(1)
2019	→ Forfar Athletic (loan)	16	(2)
2019–2020	Airdrieonians	8	(0)
Total		277	(22)

International career
2001	England U16	3	(0)
2001	England U17	1	(0)
2003	England U18	2	(0)
- * Club domestic league appearances and goals

Adam James Eckersley (born 7 September 1985) is an English former professional footballer who played primarily as a full-back. He is the older brother of fellow professional footballer Richard Eckersley.

He started his career with Manchester United in 2004 but failed to break into the first team in his four years there and was loaned out to Royal Antwerp, Brøndby, Barnsley and Port Vale, before joining Port Vale permanently in 2008. Later that year, he transferred to Danish club AC Horsens. In 2010, he moved on to AGF Aarhus. He won the Danish 1st Division championship with both clubs, in 2009–10 and then in 2010–11.

In 2014, he moved to Hearts and helped the club to win the Scottish Championship in 2014–15. He spent a brief time at Hibernian in 2015 before joining the Canadian side FC Edmonton in January 2016. He returned to Scotland 12 months later to play for St Mirren, helping the club to the Scottish Championship title at the end of the 2017–18 season. After a spell on loan with Forfar Athletic, Eckersley joined Airdrieonians for a one-season stay in May 2019. He also played for England at U16, U17, and U18 level.

== Career ==
=== Manchester United ===
Born in Salford, Greater Manchester, Eckersley grew up in Walkden. As a nine-year-old, he signed his first contract with Manchester United in 2002. He became a professional in July 2004. He was a member of the United reserve team that won the quadruple in 2005. He made his senior team debut in the League Cup on 26 October 2005, starting at left-back in the 4–1 home win over Barnet. Eckersley then went on loan to the Belgian Second Division club Royal Antwerp in January 2006, to gain further first-team match experience. Eckersley was linked with a move to NEC of the Netherlands as a replacement for Jeffrey Leiwakabessy in April 2006, but instead he was loaned out to Brøndby in August 2006. However, he was injured during his stay at Brøndby and only played six matches for the club before the loan ended on 31 December 2006.

He joined Barnsley on 8 January 2007 on loan until the end of the season, but the loan was effectively cut short in April 2007 when Eckersley returned to Manchester United after suffering a tore thigh muscle and did not play for Barnsley again. He was promoted to the first-team squad as cover for the injured Mikaël Silvestre at the start of the 2007–08 season, before moving to Port Vale on a month-long loan on 12 October 2007. He made his debut in a defeat to Brighton & Hove Albion on 13 October 2007, in which he was sent off. However, he only made one more appearance before picking up a knee injury and returning to Manchester United for treatment.

=== Port Vale ===
On 1 January 2008, Eckersley moved back to Port Vale, this time permanently, though only signing a six-month deal, becoming manager Lee Sinnott's first non-loan signing. Eckersley scored his first goal in English football and his first anywhere since a loan spell at Royal Antwerp in a 2–2 home draw with Yeovil Town on 29 January 2008, but he soon left the club when his contract expired at the end of the 2007–08 campaign, following Port Vale's relegation to League Two.

=== Horsens ===
Prior to the 2008–09 season, he joined Danish Superliga team Horsens on a free transfer. The "Yellow Danger" were relegated at the end of 2008–09, after manager Kent Nielsen resigned and short-term replacement Henrik Jensen failed to spark a revival; Horsens finished four points behind the safety of SønderjyskE. The club made an immediate return to the top flight by topping the 1st Division in 2009–10 under Johnny Mølby. Throughout his seasons, Eckersley made forty league appearances, scoring twice.

=== AGF Aarhus ===
In the summer of 2010, Eckersley moved to AGF Aarhus, manager Peter Sørensen intending him to replace Dennis Cagara. In his first season, he helped the club to promotion into the Danish top-flight as champions of the 1st Division. After some consistently great performances for AGF as attacking left-back and a tremendous first half-season in the Danish Superliga, including a stunning free-kick goal against Lyngby in round 13, he was selected for Les Rosbifs 'Team of the Year 2011' for best Englishmen playing overseas. AGF finished fifth in 2011–12, with Eckersley scoring seven goals in 48 appearances. The club finished in seventh place in 2012–13, and Eckersley played 35 games, including two Europa League matches. AGF dropped out of the top-flight after relegation in 2013–14. At the end of the season, it was announced that Eckersley was being released by AGF and hinted that he may return to England.

=== Hearts ===
In August 2014, Eckersley signed for Scottish Championship side Hearts until the end of the season, and having turned down an offer from a Scottish Premiership club to join Hearts he stated that move was the "best decision of his career". He made his Hearts debut on 13 September, coming on as a substitute for Kevin McHattie, in a 0–0 draw with Dumbarton. Eckersley then scored his first goal for Hearts, in a 1–0 win over Alloa Athletic on 11 October, and he scored his second goal for the club in a 4–1 win over Queen of the South on 6 December. He was a regular first-team player under manager Robbie Neilson, and helped Hearts to win promotion as champions in the 2014–15 campaign. It was reported in the Edinburgh Evening News that Hearts had decided in April 2015 not to renew Eckersley's contract for the next season. His agent stated that money was not an issue in negotiations, and that the club retracted an initial informal offer of a new contract.

=== Hibernian to FC Edmonton ===
In September 2015, Eckersley signed a short-term contract with Hibernian. Eckersley left Hibs after a four-month spell which was marred by injury. He signed with FC Edmonton in the North American Soccer League in January 2016. He missed the start of the 2016 season with a groin injury.

=== St Mirren ===
He returned to the Scottish Championship in January 2017 when he signed a short-term contract with St Mirren. He made 15 appearances for Jack Ross's "Buddies" in the second half of the 2016–17 campaign, including one in the final of the Scottish Challenge Cup at Fir Park, which ended in a 2–1 defeat to Dundee United. In May 2017, Eckersley signed a two-year contract extension, keeping him at St Mirren Park until the summer of 2019. He made 27 appearances across the 2017–18 campaign as the "Saints" secured promotion to the Scottish Premiership as champions of the Championship.

Having been told he could look for a new club by then St. Mirren manager Alan Stubbs in the summer of 2018, Eckersley and Jamie Langfield were identified by television pundit Chris Sutton as "snakes" in the team dressing room who led to Stubbs' sacking.

Eckersley found first-team opportunities limited at St. Mirren as he struggled with injuries. In January 2019, manager Oran Kearney agreed to allow him to join Scottish League One side Forfar Athletic on loan until the end of the 2018–19 season. The "Loons" ended the campaign in second-place and went on to lose 3–2 on aggregate to Raith Rovers in the play-off semi-finals.

=== Airdrieonians ===
Eckersley had been due to join Forfar permanently in the summer of 2019 after signing a pre-contract agreement earlier in the year. A change of circumstances meant that this arrangement was cancelled by mutual agreement, and Eckersley instead signed for League One rivals Airdrieonians. He was limited to just eight league appearances during the 2019–20 campaign; Ian Murray's "Diamonds" finished the league in third-place. Eckersley was one of 17 players to leave the Excelsior Stadium in June 2020 as the club opted to release the majority of their squad.

== Personal life ==
Eckersley married Danish woman Elisabeth while playing in Denmark. Eckersley revealed the couple were married "in the City Chambers, right near the Castle".

Eckersley credited Alex Ferguson for helping him to stop gambling after Ferguson grew concerned about Eckersley's habit; Eckersley stopped playing poker after Ferguson told him a story about Keith Gillespie and his gambling habit.

== Career statistics ==
Appearances and goals by club, season and competition
Club	Season	League			National cup (Note: Includes FA Cup, Belgian Cup, Danish Cup, Scottish Cup, U.S. Open Cup)		League cup (Note: Includes Football League Cup, Scottish League Cup)		Continental		Other		Total	
Club	Season	Division	Apps	Goals	Apps	Goals	Apps	Goals	Apps	Goals	Apps	Goals	Apps	Goals
Manchester United	2005–06	Premier League	0	0	0	0	1	0	0	0	—		1	0
Manchester United	2006–07	Premier League	0	0	0	0	0	0	0	0	—		0	0
Manchester United	2007–08	Premier League	0	0	0	0	0	0	0	0	—		0	0
Manchester United	Total		0	0	0	0	1	0	0	0	—		1	0
Royal Antwerp (loan)	2006–07	Belgian Second Division	16	1	0	0	—		—		—		16	1
Brøndby (loan)	2006–07	Danish Superliga	4	0	0	0	—		—		—		4	0
Barnsley (loan)	2006–07	Championship	6	0	0	0	—		—		—		6	0
Port Vale	2007–08	League One	18	1	0	0	—		—		—		18	1
Horsens	2008–09	Danish Superliga	17	1	0	0	0	0	—		—		17	1
Horsens	2009–10	Danish 1st Division	23	1	1	0	0	0	—		—		24	1
Horsens	Total		40	2	1	0	0	0	—		—		41	2
AGF Aarhus	2010–11	Danish 1st Division	22	3	1	0	0	0	0	0	—		23	3
AGF Aarhus	2011–12	Danish Superliga	26	4	6	1	3	1	13	1	—		48	7
AGF Aarhus	2012–13	Danish Superliga	26	5	0	0	2	0	7	0	—		35	5
AGF Aarhus	2013–14	Danish Superliga	11	1	1	0	0	0	—		—		12	1
AGF Aarhus	Total		85	13	8	1	5	1	20	1	—		118	16
Hearts	2014–15	Scottish Championship	24	2	1	0	2	0	—		0	0	27	2
Hibernian	2015–16	Scottish Championship	0	0	0	0	0	0	—		0	0	0	0
FC Edmonton	2016	North American Soccer League	24	0	0	0	2	1	0	0	—		26	1
St Mirren	2016–17	Scottish Championship	12	0	1	0	—		—		2 (Note: Appearance(s) in the Scottish Challenge Cup)	0	15	0
St Mirren	2017–18	Scottish Championship	24	1	0	0	0	0	—		3	0	27	1
St Mirren	2018–19	Scottish Premiership	0	0	0	0	0	0	—		—		0	0
St Mirren	Total		36	1	1	0	0	0	—		5	0	42	1
Forfar Athletic (loan)	2018–19	Scottish League One	16	2	1	0	0	0	—		2 (Note: Appearance(s) in the play-offs)	0	19	2
Airdrieonians	2019–20	Scottish League One	8	0	0	0	4	1	—		2	0	14	1
Total			277	22	12	1	14	3	20	1	9	0	332	27

== Honours ==
AC Horsens

- Danish 1st Division: 2009–10

AGF Aarhus

- Danish 1st Division: 2010–11

Hearts

- Scottish Championship: 2014–15

St Mirren

- Scottish Championship: 2017–18
