= Ronald Eckersley =

English cricketer

Ronald Eckersley (4 September 1925 in Bingley, Yorkshire, England – 30 May 2009) was an English former first-class cricketer, who played one match for Yorkshire County Cricket Club against the Royal Air Force, at North Marine Road Ground, Scarborough in 1945. The RAF fielded players such as Cyril Washbrook, Bill Edrich and Bob Wyatt.

A left arm medium fast bowler, he failed to take a wicket while conceding 62 runs. A right-handed batsman he went unbeaten in his first-class career at the crease, his solitary innings ending 9 not out. The game ended in a draw.

He played for Accrington Cricket Club in the Lancashire League from 1948 to 1954. He was considered the leading amateur bowler for Accrington during this period.
