= Pål Fjelde =

Norwegian footballer (born 1994)

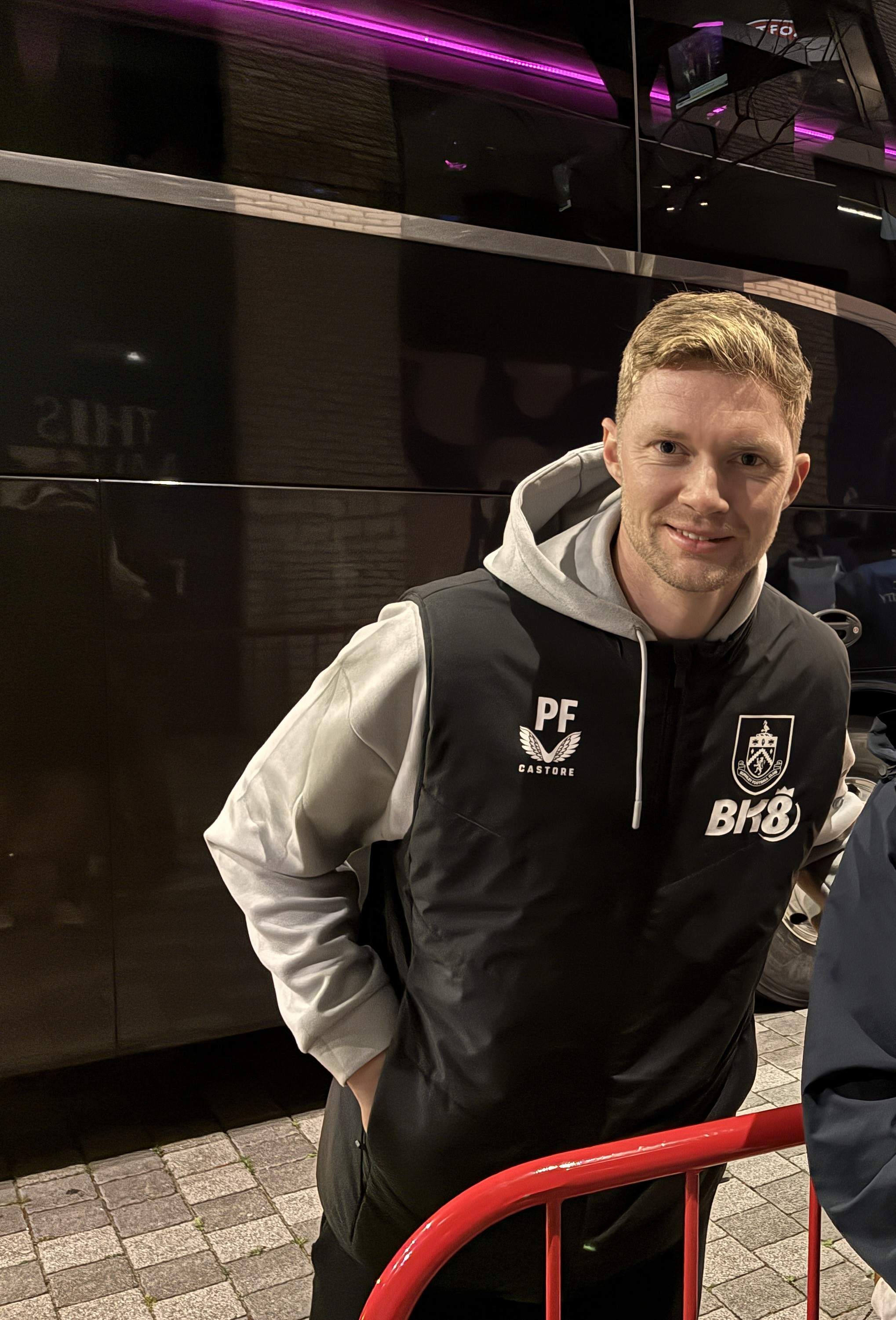
- Pål Fjelde in 2025.

Personal information
- Date of birth: 26 July 1994 (age 32)
- Place of birth: Jørpeland, Norway
- Height: 1.88 m (6 ft 2 in)
- Positions: Defender; midfielder

Team information
- Current team: Aston Villa (coach)

Youth career
- Staal
- Viking

Senior career*
Years	Team	Apps	(Gls)
2014–2015	Viking	1	(0)
2015–2017	Bryne	49	(2)
2017	St Mirren	3	(0)
2017	07 Vestur	13	(2)
2018–2019	Bryne	37	(0)
2020–2021	Staal	10	(0)

Managerial career
- 2018–2019: Bryne (youth)
- 2020: Viking (youth)
- 2021–2025: Viking (assistant)
- * Club domestic league appearances and goals as of 23:13, 10 March 2022 (UTC)

Pål Fjelde (born 26 July 1994) is a former Norwegian footballer and the set-piece coach at Aston Villa. Fjelde has previously played for Norwegian clubs Viking and Bryne, and had brief spells with Scottish Championship side St Mirren and Faroe Islands Premier League side 07 Vestur.

== Career ==
Born in Jørpeland, Fjelde started his career at Staal. He made his league debut as a substitute against Stabæk in June 2014. On 20 November 2014, he signed for Norwegian First Division side Bryne.

On 12 January 2017, Fjelde transferred to Scottish Championship side St Mirren, signing with the club until the end of the 2016–17 season. Fjelde left the club at the end of his contract, having made seven appearances for the Buddies.

=== Later and coaching career ===
In January 2018, Fjelde returned to Bryne. Beside that, 24-year old Fjelde also coached the clubs U16s. Furthermore, he also coached in the talent project Jæder Talent, and worked at the club's football leisure scheme.

In January 2020, Fjelde returned to his former childhood club Staal. He was also hired to coach Viking's 16-2 team.

On 28 June 2020, Fjelde was also hired player-manager for Staal together with Vegard Oftedal on interim basis. The duo was replaced on 3 August 2020. However, he continued as a player for the club and also in his coaching position at Viking.

Fjelde was also a set-piece coach for Norway's national team. He was included in Norway's staff for the 2026 FIFA World Cup.

In August 2026, Fjelde joined Premier League club Aston Villa, replacing outgoing set-piece coach Austin MacPhee.
