= Charles Ewart Eckersley =

English teacher

Charles Ewart Eckersley (1892–1967) was an English teacher, best known for his book Essential English for Foreign Students, volumes 1-4, one of the titles in the Essential English Library series.

Charles Ewart Eckersley grew up in the North of England and attended Manchester University, where he gained an M.A. in English. He served in the Royal Artillery during World War I and later gained his first civilian job as a schoolmaster. He was appointed to the staff of the Polytechnic Boys’ School in Regent Street, London, in 1921. The school was associated with the Polytechnic Institute, which specialised in technical education and language teaching, and provided classes in English for foreigners. It was a frequent occurrence for Boys’ Schoolmasters to be asked to help with the Institute’s evening classes, and so it was that Eckersley gained his first experience of teaching English as a foreign language. The methods used by a French master at the Boys’ School, H.O. Coleman (who was a friend of Harold E. Palmer’s), appear to have been particularly inspirational for Eckersley in his transition from teaching English as a mother tongue to English as a foreign language.

His son, John Eckersley, founded the Eckersley School of English, one of the first language schools in the city of Oxford in 1955.
