= Stelios Demetriou =

Cypriot international footballer (born 1990)

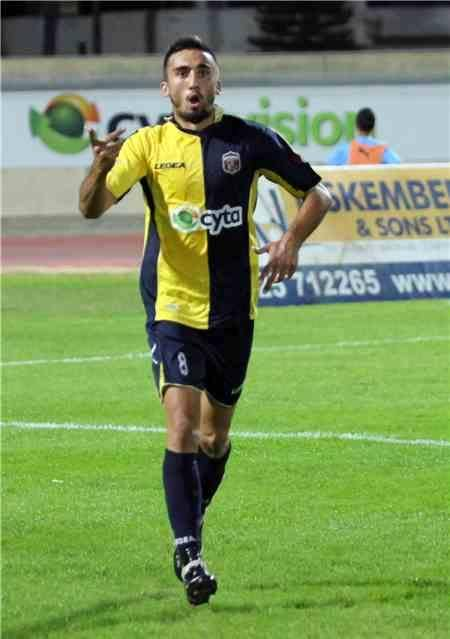
- Demetriou playing for Ermis Aradippou in 2015

Personal information
- Date of birth: 4 October 1990 (age 36)
- Place of birth: London, England
- Positions: Full-back; wing back

Team information
- Current team: Enosis Neon Paralimni

Youth career
- Apollon Limassol

Senior career*
| Years | Team | Apps | (Gls) |
| 2009–2010 | Nikos & Sokratis Erimis | 23 | (2) |
| 2010–2011 | Akritas Chlorakas | 23 | (4) |
| 2011–2012 | Apollon Limassol | 0 | (0) |
| 2011–2012 | → Ermis Aradippou (loan) | 11 | (1) |
| 2012 | Lokomotiv Plovdiv | 13 | (1) |
| 2013–2015 | Ermis Aradippou | 37 | (1) |
| 2015 | Akropolis IF | 5 | (0) |
| 2015–2017 | Doxa Katokopias | 46 | (2) |
| 2017–2018 | St Mirren | 35 | (4) |
| 2018–2019 | Ross County | 9 | (0) |
| 2019 | Macclesfield Town | 2 | (0) |
| 2019-2020 | Bradford Park Avenue | 5 | (0) |
| 2020–2021 | Ermis Aradippou | 34 | (3) |
| 2021–2022 | Nea Salamina | 25 | (0) |
| 2022–2023 | Niki Volos | 8 | (0) |
| 2023– | Enosis Neon Paralimni | 0 | (0) |

International career^{‡}
| 2011–2012 | Cyprus U21 | 9 | (1) |
| 2018 | Cyprus | 1 | (0) |
- * Club domestic league appearances and goals as of 16 June 2023 ‡ National team caps and goals as of 24 May 2018 (UTC)

Stelios Demetriou (Greek: Στέλιος Δημητρίου; born 4 October 1990) is a Cypriot international footballer who plays as a full back for Enosis Neon Paralimni. He has previously played for Doxa Katokopias, Akritas Chlorakas, Apollon Limassol, Ermis Aradippou, Lokomotiv Plovdiv, St Mirren, Ross County and Macclesfield Town.

== Club career ==
Stelios Demetriou won the first trophy in his career with Ermis Aradippou in the Cypriot Super Cup in 2014 against APOEL, and it was also the club's first trophy in its history. He has also represented Cyprus at under-21 level.

Demetriou signed for Scottish Championship side St Mirren in January 2017. After impressing in his short time at the club, he signed a new one-year deal in June 2017. Demetriou helped St Mirren win the 2017–18 Scottish Championship, but was released at the end of his contract.

On 25 June 2018 Demetriou signed for Scottish Championship side Ross County. He then moved to Macclesfield Town in January 2019. He was released by Macclesfield after only two appearances.

== International career ==
On 20 May 2018 Demetriou made his debut for Cyprus in a 3–0 friendly match defeat by Jordan. Demetriou came on as an 87th-minute substitute, and was booked the following minute.

== Honours ==
Ermis Aradippou

- Cypriot Super Cup: 2014

St Mirren

- Scottish Championship: 2017–18

Ross County

- Scottish Championship: 2018-19
