= 2020–21 Scottish League Cup group stage =

2020–21 Scottish League Cup (group stage)
Tournament details
- Country: Scotland
- Dates: 6 October 2020 – 15 November 2020
- Teams: 40

Tournament statistics
- Matches played: 77
- Goals scored: 237 (3.08 per match)
- Top goal scorer(s): Manny Duku, Alan Forrest & Stevie May (5 goals)

The 2020–21 Scottish League Cup Group stage took place from 6 October 2020 to 15 November 2020. A total of 40 teams competed in the group stage. The winners of each of the eight groups, as well as the four best runners-up progressed to the second round (last 16) of the 2020–21 Scottish League Cup.

== Format ==
The group stage consisted of eight groups of five teams. The four clubs competing in the UEFA Champions League (Celtic) and Europa League (Rangers, Motherwell, and Aberdeen) qualifying rounds were given a bye through to the second round. The 40 teams taking part in the group stage consisted of the other eight teams that competed in the 2019–20 Scottish Premiership, and all of the teams that competed in the 2019–20 Scottish Championship, 2019–20 Scottish League One and 2019–20 Scottish League Two, as well as the 2019–20 Highland Football League and the 2019–20 Lowland Football League champions.

The winners of each of the eight groups, as well as the four best runners-up, progressed to the second round (last 16), which included the four UEFA qualifying clubs. At this stage, the competition reverted to the traditional knock-out format. The four group winners with the highest points total and the clubs entering at this stage were seeded, with the four group winners with the lowest points unseeded along with the four best runners-up.

The traditional point system of awarding three points for a win and one point for a draw was used, however, for each group stage match that finished in a draw, a penalty shoot-out took place, with the winner being awarded a bonus point.

The draw for the group stage took place on 10 August 2020 and was broadcast live on FreeSports & the SPFL YouTube channel.

== Teams ==
=== North ===
==== Seeding ====
Teams in Bold qualified for the second round.

Top seeds	Second seeds	Unseeded
01. **St Johnstone**; 02. **Hibernian**; 03. **Ross County**; 04. **Heart of Midlothian**	05. Dundee United; 06. Inverness CT; 07. **Dundee**; 08. **Arbroath**	09. Raith Rovers; 10. Montrose; 11. East Fife; 12. Peterhead; 13. Forfar Athletic; 14. Cove Rangers; 15. Elgin City; 16. Cowdenbeath; 17. Stirling Albion; 18. Brechin City; 19. Brora Rangers; 20. Kelty Hearts

=== South ===
==== Seeding ====
Top seeds	Second seeds	Unseeded
21. **Livingston**; 22. Kilmarnock; 23. **St Mirren**; 24. Hamilton Academical	25. **Ayr United**; 26. **Dunfermline Athletic**; 27. Greenock Morton; 28. **Alloa Athletic**	29. Queen of the South; 30. Partick Thistle; 31. **Falkirk**; 32. Airdrieonians; 33. Dumbarton; 34. Clyde; 35. Stranraer; 36. Edinburgh City; 37. Queen's Park; 38. Annan Athletic; 39. Stenhousemuir; 40. Albion Rovers

== North ==
=== Group A ===
Pos	Team	Pld	W	PW	PL	L	GF	GA	GD	Pts	Qualification	HOM	RAI	ICT	EFI	COW
1	Heart of Midlothian	4	4	0	0	0	8	3	+5	12	Qualification for the Second round	—	3–1	1–0	—	—
2	Raith Rovers	4	2	1	0	1	7	7	0	8		—	—	p3–3	2–1	—
3	Inverness Caledonian Thistle	4	1	1	1	1	4	4	0	6		—	—	—	1–0	p0–0
4	East Fife	4	1	0	0	3	5	6	−1	3		2–3	—	—	—	2–0
5	Cowdenbeath	4	0	0	1	3	0	4	−4	1		0–1	0–1	—	—	—

Rules for classification: 1) points, 2) goal difference, 3) goals scored, 4) away goals scored, 5) matches won, 6) away matches won, 7) drawing of lots.

==== Matches ====
6 October 2020
19:45

East Fife	2–0	Cowdenbeath
Hamilton 70'; Wallace 82'

Bayview Stadium, Methil
Referee: Chris Graham
6 October 2020
19:45

Heart of Midlothian	1–0	Inverness Caledonian Thistle
Walker 62' (pen.)

Tynecastle Park, Edinburgh
Referee: Steven McLean
10 October 2020
15:00

Cowdenbeath	0–1	Heart of Midlothian
		Halkett 78'

Bayview Stadium, Methil
Referee: Alan Newlands
10 October 2020
15:00

Raith Rovers	2–1	East Fife
Hendry 45'; Duku 87'		Newton 15'

Stark's Park, Kirkcaldy
Referee: David Lowe
13 October 2020
18:30

Inverness Caledonian Thistle	0–0	Cowdenbeath
Penalties
Keatings (penalty scored); Todorov (penalty scored); Welsh (penalty scored); Allardice (penalty scored)	4–2	(penalty missed) Taylor; (penalty scored) Hamilton; (penalty scored) Swann; (penalty missed) Robertson

Caledonian Stadium, Inverness
Referee: Graham Beaton
13 October 2020
19:45

Heart of Midlothian	3–1	Raith Rovers
Wighton 2' (pen.), 40' (pen.), 87'		Duku 54'

Tynecastle Park, Edinburgh
Referee: Craig Napier
10 November 2020
19:45

East Fife	2–3	Heart of Midlothian
Hamilton 39'; Wallace 64'		Lee 1', 3'; Irving 62'

Bayview Stadium, Methil
Referee: Euan Anderson
10 November 2020
19:45

Raith Rovers	3–3	Inverness Caledonian Thistle
Duku 11', 90'; Devine 59' (o.g.)		Sutherland 24'; Keatings 67' (pen.); MacGregor 69'
Penalties
Hendry (penalty scored); Matthews (penalty scored); Armstrong (penalty scored); Spencer (penalty missed)	3–2	(penalty missed) Todorov; (penalty missed) Keatings; (penalty scored) Deas; (penalty scored) Allardice; (penalty missed) Kennedy

Stark's Park, Kirkcaldy
Referee: Steven Reid
14 November 2020
15:00

Cowdenbeath	0–1	Raith Rovers
		Duku 36'

Central Park, Cowdenbeath
Referee: David Lowe
14 November 2020
15:00

Inverness Caledonian Thistle	1–0	East Fife
Sutherland 64'

Caledonian Stadium, Inverness
Referee: Chris Graham

=== Group B ===
Pos	Team	Pld	W	PW	PL	L	GF	GA	GD	Pts	Qualification	HIB	DUN	COV	BRO	FOR
1	Hibernian	4	4	0	0	0	10	3	+7	12	Qualification for the Second round	—	4–1	—	3–1	—
2	Dundee	4	3	0	0	1	9	4	+5	9	Qualification for the Second round	—	—	3–0	—	3–0
3	Cove Rangers	4	1	1	0	2	4	7	−3	5		1–2	—	—	—	1–0
4	Brora Rangers	4	0	0	2	2	6	10	−4	2		—	0–2	2–2p	—	—
5	Forfar Athletic	4	0	1	0	3	3	8	−5	2		0–1	—	—	p3–3	—

Rules for classification: 1) points, 2) goal difference, 3) goals scored, 4) away goals scored, 5) matches won, 6) away matches won, 7) drawing of lots.

==== Matches ====
6 October 2020
19:45

Dundee	3–0 (awarded)	Forfar Athletic

Dens Park, Dundee
7 October 2020
19:45

Hibernian	3–1	Brora Rangers
Mallan 8', 12'; Hanlon 89'		Gillespie 61'

Easter Road, Edinburgh
Referee: Alan Muir
10 October 2020
12:30

Cove Rangers	1–2	Hibernian
Higgins 17'		Gullan 49'; Nisbet 60'

Balmoral Stadium, Aberdeen
Referee: Euan Anderson
10 October 2020
15:00

Brora Rangers	0–2	Dundee
		Dorrans 11'; Mullen 27'

Dudgeon Park, Brora
Referee: Barry Cook
13 October 2020
19:45

Brora Rangers	2–2	Cove Rangers
MacLean 29'; Wagenaar 72'		McAllister 18'; Semple 28'
Penalties
Wagenaar (penalty scored); MacLean (penalty scored); A. MacRae (penalty scored); J. MacRae (penalty scored); Malin (penalty missed); Nicolson (penalty scored); Williamson (penalty missed)	5–6	(penalty scored) Semple; (penalty scored) Milne; (penalty scored) Watson; (penalty scored) Livingstone; (penalty missed) Higgins; (penalty scored) Yule; (penalty scored) McKenzie

Dudgeon Park, Brora
Referee: Duncan Williams
13 October 2020
19:45

Forfar Athletic	0–1	Hibernian
		Gray 87'

Station Park, Forfar
Referee: David Munro
10 November 2020
19:45

Dundee	3–0	Cove Rangers
McGowan 6'; Mullen 84'; Adam 87' (pen.)

Dens Park, Dundee
Referee: Craig Napier
10 November 2020
19:45

Forfar Athletic	3–3	Brora Rangers
MacKintosh 34', 81'; Allan 97' (pen.)		Irvine 42' (o.g.); MacLean 52'; J. MacRae 84'
Penalties
Allan (penalty missed); Shepherd (penalty scored); Barr (penalty scored); Breadner (penalty scored); Antoniazzi (penalty scored)	4–3	(penalty scored) Nicolson; (penalty missed) Brindle; (penalty scored) A. MacRae; (penalty scored) J. MacRae; (penalty missed) MacLean

Station Park, Forfar
Referee: Grant Irvine
14 November 2020
15:00

Cove Rangers	1–0	Forfar Athletic
McAllister 68' (pen.)

Balmoral Stadium, Aberdeen
Referee: Duncan Williams
15 November 2020
16:30

Hibernian	4–1	Dundee
Mallan 10'; Nisbet 76'; Gullan 80'; Hallberg 82'		Elliott 71'

Easter Road, Edinburgh
Referee: John Beaton

Notes

1. A: Dundee were awarded a technical 3−0 win over Forfar Athletic who were unable to raise a team after a player tested positive for COVID-19.

=== Group C ===
Pos	Team	Pld	W	PW	PL	L	GF	GA	GD	Pts	Qualification	STJ	DUN	PET	KEL	BRE
1	St Johnstone	4	3	0	1	0	12	2	+10	10	Qualification for the Second round	—	0–0p	—	—	7–0
2	Dundee United	4	2	1	0	1	7	3	+4	8		—	—	0–1	1–0	—
3	Peterhead	4	2	1	0	1	6	5	+1	8		1–3	—	—	—	3–1
4	Kelty Hearts	4	1	0	1	2	4	4	0	4		1–2	—	1–1p	—	—
5	Brechin City	4	0	0	0	4	3	18	−15	0		—	2–6	—	0–2	—

Rules for classification: 1) points, 2) goal difference, 3) goals scored, 4) away goals scored, 5) matches won, 6) away matches won, 7) drawing of lots.

==== Matches ====
7 October 2020
19:45

Kelty Hearts	1–2	St Johnstone
Tidser 71'		Kerr 45+2'; Kane 60'

New Central Park, Kelty
Referee: Alan Newlands
7 October 2020
19:45

Brechin City	2–6	Dundee United
Inglis 52' (pen.); Currie 54'		Clark 15', 18'; Butcher 40'; Harkes 47'; Smith 60', 90+3'

Glebe Park, Brechin
Referee: Steven Kirkland
10 October 2020
15:00

Dundee United	0–1	Peterhead
		Boyd 51'

Tannadice Park, Dundee
Referee: Bobby Madden
10 October 2020
15:00

St Johnstone	7–0	Brechin City
May 3', 58', 62'; Wotherspoon 25', 56'; Hendry 88' (pen.); Davidson 90'

McDiarmid Park, Perth
Referee: Craig Napier
13 October 2020
19:45

Dundee United	1–0	Kelty Hearts
Edwards 45+3'

Tannadice Park, Dundee
Referee: Don Robertson
13 October 2020
19:45

Peterhead	3–1	Brechin City
Layne 13', 17'; Boyd 24'		Inglis 46'

Balmoor Stadium, Peterhead
Referee: Chris Graham
10 November 2020
19:45

Kelty Hearts	1–1	Peterhead
Stevenson 66'		Fraser 49'
Penalties
Tidser (penalty missed); Boyle (penalty scored); Stevenson (penalty scored); Easton (penalty scored)	3–5	(penalty scored) Brown; (penalty scored) Fraser; (penalty scored) Boyd; (penalty scored) Lyle; (penalty scored) Conroy

New Central Park, Kelty
Referee: Gavin Ross
10 November 2020
19:45

St Johnstone	0–0	Dundee United
Penalties
May (penalty missed); Booth (penalty scored); Conway (penalty scored); Tanser (penalty missed); Craig (penalty scored)	3–4	(penalty scored) McNulty; (penalty scored) Harkes; (penalty missed) Connolly; (penalty scored) Reynolds; (penalty scored) Clark

McDiarmid Park, Perth
Referee: Don Robertson
14 November 2020
15:00

Brechin City	0–2	Kelty Hearts
		Easton 48'; McNab 79'

Glebe Park, Brechin
Referee: Graham Grainger
14 November 2020
15:00

Peterhead	1–3	St Johnstone
Rooney 78' (o.g.)		May 49' (pen.), 60' (pen.); Kane 77'

Balmoor Stadium, Peterhead
Referee: Euan Anderson

=== Group D ===
Pos	Team	Pld	W	PW	PL	L	GF	GA	GD	Pts	Qualification	ROS	ARB	ELG	STI	MON
1	Ross County	4	3	1	0	0	12	5	+7	11	Qualification for the Second round	—	2–1	—	3–0	—
2	Arbroath	4	3	0	0	1	9	4	+5	9	Qualification for the Second round	—	—	3–0	—	3–1
3	Elgin City	4	2	0	0	2	5	7	−2	6		1–4	—	—	2–0	—
4	Stirling Albion	4	1	0	0	3	3	8	−5	3		—	1–2	—	—	2–1
5	Montrose	4	0	0	1	3	5	10	−5	1		3–3p	—	0–2	—	—

Rules for classification: 1) points, 2) goal difference, 3) goals scored, 4) away goals scored, 5) matches won, 6) away matches won, 7) drawing of lots.

==== Matches ====
6 October 2020
19:45

Stirling Albion	1–2	Arbroath
Ryan 76'		Donnelly 14'; O'Brien 32'

Forthbank Stadium, Stirling
Referee: Barry Cook
7 October 2020
19:45

Montrose	3–3	Ross County
Webster 63'; Ballantyne 67'; Steeves 89'		Shaw 13'; Mckay 15'; Charles-Cook 52'
Penalties
Webster (penalty scored); Steeves (penalty scored); Milne (penalty scored); Campbell (penalty scored); Rennie (penalty missed)	4–5	(penalty scored) Stewart; (penalty scored) Mckay; (penalty scored) Paton; (penalty scored) Gardyne; (penalty scored) Lakin

Links Park, Montrose
Referee: Gavin Duncan
10 October 2020
15:00

Arbroath	3–1	Montrose
Swankie 27'; Thomson 43'; O'Brien 86'		Webster 10'

Gayfield Park, Arbroath
Referee: Graham Beaton
10 October 2020
15:00

Elgin City	2–0	Stirling Albion
Hester 67'; Dingwall 81' (pen.)

Borough Briggs, Elgin
Referee: Dan McFarlane
13 October 2020
19:45

Montrose	0–2	Elgin City
		O'Keefe 27'; Peters 36'

Links Park, Montrose
Referee: David Dickinson
13 October 2020
19:45

Ross County	2–1	Arbroath
Stewart 65', 68' (pen.)		Hilson 49'

Victoria Park, Dingwall
Referee: Steven McLean
10 November 2020
19:45

Elgin City	1–4	Ross County
Cameron 80'		Shaw 5'; Iacovitti 45'; Paton 51'; Lakin 77'

Borough Briggs, Elgin
Referee: Gavin Duncan
10 November 2020
19:45

Stirling Albion	2–1	Montrose
Heaver 35'; Mackin 41'		Hawke 20'

Forthbank Stadium, Stirling
Referee: Peter Stuart
14 November 2020
15:00

Ross County	3–0	Stirling Albion
Shaw 21'; Stewart 50' (pen.); Charles-Cook 71'

Victoria Park, Dingwall
Referee: Alan Muir
14 November 2020
15:25

Arbroath	3–0	Elgin City
Gold 30', 39'; Stewart 82'

Gayfield Park, Arbroath
Referee: Steven MacLean

== South ==
=== Group E ===
Pos	Team	Pld	W	PW	PL	L	GF	GA	GD	Pts	Qualification	DNF	FAL	KIL	CLY	DUM
1	Dunfermline Athletic	4	4	0	0	0	9	2	+7	12	Qualification for the Second round	—	2–0	—	3–2	—
2	Falkirk	4	3	0	0	1	9	3	+6	9	Qualification for the Second round	—	—	3–0	2–1	—
3	Kilmarnock	4	2	0	0	2	4	6	−2	6		0–3	—	—	—	2–0
4	Clyde	4	1	0	0	3	6	9	−3	3		—	—	0–2	—	3–2
5	Dumbarton	4	0	0	0	4	2	10	−8	0		0–1	0–4	—	—	—

Rules for classification: 1) points, 2) goal difference, 3) goals scored, 4) away goals scored, 5) matches won, 6) away matches won, 7) drawing of lots.

==== Matches ====
6 October 2020
19:45

Dumbarton	0–1	Dunfermline Athletic
		O'Hara 26' (pen.)

Dumbarton Football Stadium, Dumbarton
Referee: Gavin Ross
6 October 2020
19:45

Falkirk	3–0 (awarded)	Kilmarnock

Falkirk Stadium, Falkirk
9 October 2020
19:45

Dunfermline Athletic	2–0	Falkirk
Murray 58', 65'

East End Park, Dunfermline
Referee: Grant Irvine
10 October 2020
15:00

Clyde	3–2	Dumbarton
Cuddihy 10'; Goodwillie 22' (pen.); Cunningham 45'		Hamilton 40'; Jones 55'

Broadwood Stadium, Cumbernauld
Referee: Scott Lambie
13 October 2020
19:45

Falkirk	2–1	Clyde
Keena 13'; Morrison 47' (pen.)		Goodwillie 17'

Falkirk Stadium, Falkirk
Referee: Lloyd Wilson
13 October 2020
19:45

Kilmarnock	0–3	Dunfermline Athletic
		E. Murray 56'; F. Murray 73', 83'

Rugby Park, Kilmarnock
Referee: Andrew Dallas
10 November 2020
19:45

Clyde	0–2	Kilmarnock
		Whitehall 44', 49'

Broadwood Stadium, Cumbernauld
Referee: Greg Aitken
10 November 2020
19:45

Dumbarton	0–4	Falkirk
		C. Morrison 12', 49'; Sammon 73'; Dowds 82'

Dumbarton Football Stadium, Dumbarton
Referee: Scott Lambie
14 November 2020
15:00

Dunfermline Athletic	3–2	Clyde
O'Hara 60' (pen.); McManus 87'; Watson 90+1'		Love 35'; Lamont 51'

East End Park, Dunfermline
Referee: David Dickinson
14 November 2020
15:00

Kilmarnock	2–0	Dumbarton
Brophy 3'; Pinnock 45+2'

Rugby Park, Kilmarnock
Referee: Gavin Duncan

Notes

1. B: Falkirk were awarded a technical 3−0 win over Kilmarnock who were unable to raise a team after six players tested positive for COVID-19.

=== Group F ===
Pos	Team	Pld	W	PW	PL	L	GF	GA	GD	Pts	Qualification	AYR	ANN	STR	HAM	ALB
1	Ayr United	4	2	1	0	1	8	5	+3	8	Qualification for the Second round	—	1–0	p1–1	—	—
2	Annan Athletic	4	2	0	1	1	9	4	+5	7		—	—	1–1p	3–1	—
3	Stranraer	4	1	1	2	0	6	5	+1	7		—	—	—	2–1	2–2p
4	Hamilton Academical	4	2	0	0	2	7	6	+1	6		2–1	—	—	—	3–0
5	Albion Rovers	4	0	1	0	3	5	15	−10	2		2–5	1–5	—	—	—

Rules for classification: 1) points, 2) goal difference, 3) goals scored, 4) away goals scored, 5) matches won, 6) away matches won, 7) drawing of lots.

==== Matches ====
6 October 2020
19:45

Albion Rovers	2–5	Ayr United
Aitken 23' (pen.), 38'		McCowan 30'; Walsh 35'; Anderson 40', 82'; Zanatta 59'

Cliftonhill, Coatbridge
Referee: David Lowe
6 October 2020
19:45

Annan Athletic	3–1	Hamilton Academical
Swinglehurst 31'; Fulton 38'; Purdue 43'		McMann 51'

Galabank, Annan
Referee: Craig Napier
10 October 2020
15:00

Annan Athletic	1–1	Stranraer
Moxon 55'		Paton 37'
Penalties
Docherty (penalty scored); Clark (penalty scored); Moxon (penalty scored); Wright (penalty missed); Fleming (penalty scored); Splaine (penalty missed)	4–5	(penalty missed) Orr; (penalty scored) Elliott; (penalty scored) Stirling; (penalty scored) McManus; (penalty scored) Burns; (penalty scored) Gallagher

Galabank, Annan
Referee: Stewart Luke
10 October 2020
15:00

Hamilton Academical	2–1	Ayr United
Ogkmpoe 19'; Trafford 36'		Moffat 68'

New Douglas Park, Hamilton
Referee: Colin Steven
13 October 2020
19:30

Stranraer	2–2	Albion Rovers
Sonkur 18'; Paton 58'		Jamieson 29'; Fotheringham 44'
Penalties
Orr (penalty scored); Elliott (penalty scored); Stirling (penalty scored); McManus (penalty scored); Cummins (penalty scored); Paton (penalty scored); Burns (penalty scored); Devitt (penalty scored); Fleming (penalty scored); Millar (penalty scored); Robertson (penalty scored); Orr (penalty scored); Elliott (penalty scored); Stirling (penalty scored); McManus (penalty missed)	14–15	(penalty scored) Aitken; (penalty scored) Wilson; (penalty scored) Ecrepont; (penalty scored) Lynas; (penalty scored) Skeoch; (penalty scored) Fotheringham; (penalty scored) Leslie; (penalty scored) Doherty; (penalty scored) Burke; (penalty scored) Fagan; (penalty scored) Goodfellow; (penalty scored) Aitken; (penalty scored) Wilson; (penalty scored) Ecrepont; (penalty scored) Lynas

Stair Park, Stranraer
Referee: Calum Scott
13 October 2020
19:45

Ayr United	1–0	Annan Athletic
Moffat 24' (pen.)

Somerset Park, Ayr
Referee: Grant Irvine
10 November 2020
19:45

Albion Rovers	1–5	Annan Athletic
Dolan 90+1'		Wright 16', 21'; Fleming 28', 76'; Docherty 35' (pen.)

Cliftonhill, Coatbridge
Referee: Dan McFarlane
11 November 2020
19:30

Stranraer	2–1	Hamilton Academical
Orr 34'; Duffy 81'		Odoffin 71'

Stair Park, Stranraer
Referee: Willie Collum
14 November 2020
15:00

Ayr United	1–1	Stranraer
McCowan 47'		Duffy 2'
Penalties
Anderson (penalty scored); Moffat (penalty scored); Chalmers (penalty scored); McKenzie (penalty scored); McCowan (penalty scored); Miller (penalty scored)	6–5	(penalty scored) Hilton; (penalty scored) Duffy; (penalty scored) Victoria; (penalty scored) Cummins; (penalty scored) Paton; (penalty missed) Orr

Somerset Park, Ayr
Referee: Barry Cook
14 November 2020
15:00

Hamilton Academical	3–0 (awarded)	Albion Rovers

New Douglas Park, Hamilton

Notes

1. C: Hamilton Academical were awarded a technical 3−0 win over Albion Rovers who were unable to raise a team after one player tested positive for COVID-19 and two players had to self-isolate.

=== Group G ===
Pos	Team	Pld	W	PW	PL	L	GF	GA	GD	Pts	Qualification	STM	QOS	PAR	GMO	QPK
1	St Mirren	4	2	2	0	0	8	4	+4	10	Qualification for the Second round	—	—	4–1	p1–1	—
2	Queen of the South	4	1	1	2	0	7	5	+2	7		2–2p	—	0–0p	—	—
3	Partick Thistle	4	1	2	0	1	3	4	−1	7		—	—	—	p0–0	2–0
4	Greenock Morton	4	1	0	3	0	4	3	+1	6		—	2–2p	—	—	1–0
5	Queen's Park	4	0	0	0	4	1	7	−6	0		0–1	1–3	—	—	—

Rules for classification: 1) points, 2) goal difference, 3) goals scored, 4) away goals scored, 5) matches won, 6) away matches won, 7) drawing of lots.

==== Matches ====
6 October 2020
19:45

Greenock Morton	2–2	Queen of the South
McGinty 18'; Nesbitt 68'		Dobbie 53'; Shields 79'
Penalties
Jacobs (penalty scored); Colville (penalty scored); Muirhead (penalty missed); Omar (penalty missed)	2–4	(penalty scored) McKee; (penalty scored) McCabe; (penalty scored) Gibson; (penalty missed) Shields; (penalty scored) Buchanan

Cappielow, Greenock
Referee: Don Robertson
7 October 2020
19:45

St Mirren	4–1	Partick Thistle
Tait 45+1'; Obika 74'; Breen 81' (o.g.); Connolly 82'		Spittal 66'

St Mirren Park, Paisley
Referee: Colin Steven
10 October 2020
15:00

Partick Thistle	2–0	Queen's Park
Cardle 66', 81'

Firhill Stadium, Glasgow
Referee: Kevin Graham
10 October 2020
15:00

Queen of the South	2–2	St Mirren
Shields 8'; Fitzpatrick 12'		McGrath 51'; Fraser 81'
Penalties
McKee (penalty missed); Gibson (penalty missed); Buchanan (penalty scored); Obileye (penalty scored)	2–4	(penalty scored) McGrath; (penalty scored) MacPherson; (penalty scored) Morias; (penalty scored) Connolly

Palmerston Park, Dumfries
Referee: Willie Collum
13 October 2020
19:45

Greenock Morton	1–0	Queen's Park
Blues 51'

Cappielow, Greenock
Referee: Gavin Ross
13 October 2020
19:45

Queen of the South	0–0	Partick Thistle
Penalties
Obileye (penalty scored); McCabe (penalty scored); Buchanan (penalty missed); Gibson (penalty missed); Nortey (penalty missed)	2–3	(penalty scored) Rudden; (penalty missed) Docherty; (penalty missed) Spittal; (penalty scored) Kouider-Aïssa; (penalty scored) McKenna

Palmerston Park, Dumfries
Referee: Peter Stuart
10 November 2020
19:45

Queen's Park	1–3	Queen of the South
Quitongo 2'		East 22'; Joseph 32'; Maxwell 80'

Hampden Park, Glasgow
Referee: Alan Newlands
11 November 2020
19:45

St Mirren	1–1	Greenock Morton
Obika 39'		Maciver 60'
Penalties
Dennis (penalty missed); McGrath (penalty scored); Connolly (penalty scored); Erwin (penalty scored); Foley (penalty scored); Fraser (penalty scored); Mason (penalty scored)	6–5	(penalty missed) Jacobs; (penalty scored) Maciver; (penalty scored) Omar; (penalty scored) McGuffie; (penalty scored) Oliver; (penalty scored) McGinty; (penalty missed) McPake

St Mirren Park, Paisley
Referee: Bobby Madden
14 November 2020
15:00

Partick Thistle	0–0	Greenock Morton
Penalties
Bannigan (penalty scored); Foster (penalty scored); Cardle (penalty scored); Penrice (penalty scored)	4–2	(penalty scored) Jacobs; (penalty missed) Wallace; (penalty scored) McGinty; (penalty missed) Omar

Firhill Stadium, Glasgow
Referee: Steven Kirkland
14 November 2020
15:00

Queen's Park	0–1	St Mirren
		Obika 81'

Hampden Park, Glasgow
Referee: Greg Aitken

=== Group H ===
Pos	Team	Pld	W	PW	PL	L	GF	GA	GD	Pts	Qualification	LIV	ALO	EDI	AIR	STE
1	Livingston	4	4	0	0	0	15	3	+12	12	Qualification for the Second round	—	2–1	—	4–1	—
2	Alloa Athletic	4	3	0	0	1	9	5	+4	9	Qualification for the Second round	—	—	2–1	—	4–2
3	Edinburgh City	4	1	0	1	2	5	9	−4	4		1–5	—	—	—	2–2p
4	Airdrieonians	4	1	0	0	3	3	7	−4	3		—	0–2	0–1	—	—
5	Stenhousemuir	4	0	1	0	3	4	12	−8	2		0–4	—	—	0–2	—

Rules for classification: 1) points, 2) goal difference, 3) goals scored, 4) away goals scored, 5) matches won, 6) away matches won, 7) drawing of lots.

==== Matches ====
6 October 2020
19:45

Edinburgh City	1–5	Livingston
Handling 70' (pen.)		Robinson 7'; Mullin 22', 40'; Poplatnik 65'; Lokotsch 77'

Ainslie Park, Edinburgh
Referee: Willie Collum
7 October 2020
19:45

Airdrieonians	0–2	Alloa Athletic
		Trouten 14' (pen.); Thomson 69'

Excelsior Stadium, Airdrie
Referee: Steven Reid
10 October 2020
15:00

Edinburgh City	2–2	Stenhousemuir
B. Henderson 43'; De Vita 52'		Biabi 9'; Tapping 85'
Penalties
L. Henderson (penalty missed); Balatoni (penalty scored); See (penalty scored); Thomson (penalty missed)	2–4	(penalty scored) Munro; (penalty scored) Blair; (penalty scored) Spence; (penalty scored) Tapping

Ainslie Park, Edinburgh
Referee: Matthew MacDermid
10 October 2020
15:00

Livingston	2–1	Alloa Athletic
Forrest 46'; Mullin 50'		Thomson 31'

Almondvale Stadium, Livingston
Referee: Alan Muir
13 October 2020
19:30

Stenhousemuir	0–2	Airdrieonians
		McKay 47'; Thomson 87'

Ochilview Park, Stenhousemuir
Referee: Graham Grainger
13 October 2020
19:45

Alloa Athletic	2–1	Edinburgh City
Scougall 18'; Thomson 85'		B. Henderson 81'

Recreation Park, Alloa
Referee: David Lowe
10 November 2020
19:30

Stenhousemuir	0–4	Livingston
		Forrest 1', 8'; Poplatnik 30'; Taylor-Sinclair 65'

Ochilview Park, Stenhousemuir
Referee: Colin Steven
11 November 2020
19:45

Airdrieonians	0–1	Edinburgh City
		B. Henderson 5'

Excelsior Stadium, Airdrie
Referee: Kevin Graham
14 November 2020
15:00

Alloa Athletic	4–2	Stenhousemuir
Buchanan 64', 70' (pen.), 78'; Hetherington 90'		Graham 33'; Spence 37' (pen.)

Recreation Park, Alloa
Referee: Grant Irvine
14 November 2020
15:00

Livingston	4–1	Airdrieonians
Forrest 57', 83'; Emmanuel-Thomas 58' (pen.), 67'		Robert 52'

Almondvale Stadium, Livingston
Referee: David Munro

== Best runners-up ==
Pos	Grp	Team	Pld	W	PW	PL	L	GF	GA	GD	Pts	Qualification
1	E	Falkirk	4	3	0	0	1	9	3	+6	9	Qualification for the Second round
2	D	Arbroath	4	3	0	0	1	9	4	+5	9	Qualification for the Second round
3	B	Dundee	4	3	0	0	1	9	4	+5	9	Qualification for the Second round
4	H	Alloa Athletic	4	3	0	0	1	9	5	+4	9	Qualification for the Second round
5	C	Dundee United	4	2	1	0	1	7	3	+4	8	
6	A	Raith Rovers	4	2	1	0	1	7	7	0	8	
7	F	Annan Athletic	4	2	0	1	1	9	4	+5	7	
8	G	Queen of the South	4	1	1	2	0	7	5	+2	7	

Rules for classification: 1) points, 2) goal difference, 3) goals scored, 4) away goals scored, 5) matches won, 6) away matches won, 7) drawing of lots.

== Qualified teams ==
Team	Qualified as	Qualified on	Notes
Heart of Midlothian	Group A Winner	10 November 2020	Seeded for the second round
Hibernian	Group B Winner	14 November 2020	Seeded for the second round
St Johnstone	Group C Winner	14 November 2020	
Ross County	Group D Winner	14 November 2020	
Dunfermline Athletic	Group E Winner	14 November 2020	Seeded for the second round
Ayr United	Group F Winner	14 November 2020	
St Mirren	Group G Winner	14 November 2020	
Livingston	Group H Winner	14 November 2020	Seeded for the second round
Arbroath	Best 4 Runners Up	14 November 2020	
Falkirk	Best 4 Runners Up	14 November 2020	
Alloa Athletic	Best 4 Runners Up	14 November 2020	
Dundee	Best 4 Runners Up	14 November 2020	

== Top goalscorers ==
Rank	Player	Club	Goals
1	(Scotland) Alan Forrest	Livingston	5
1	(Netherlands) Manny Duku	Raith Rovers	5
1	(Scotland) Stevie May	St Johnstone	5
4	(Scotland) Robert Thomson	Alloa Athletic	3
4	(Scotland) Liam Buchanan	Alloa Athletic	3
4	(Scotland) Euan Murray	Dunfermline Athletic	3
4	(Scotland) Blair Henderson	Edinburgh City	3
4	(Scotland) Callumn Morrison	Falkirk	3
4	(Scotland) Craig Wighton	Heart of Midlothian	3
4	(Scotland) Stevie Mallan	Hibernian	3
4	(Scotland) Josh Mullin	Livingston	3
4	(Scotland) Oli Shaw	Ross County	3
4	(Scotland) Ross Stewart	Ross County	3
4	(England) Jonathan Obika	St Mirren	3
