= 2020–21 Forfar Athletic F.C. season =

Forfar Athletic
2020–21 season
- Chairman: Ross Graham (until September); Scott Murdie (from September)
- Manager: Stuart Malcolm (until 9 April); Gary Irvine (from 4 May)
- Stadium: Station Park
- Scottish League One: 10th
- Scottish Cup: Fourth round
- Scottish League Cup: Group stage
| Home colours | Away colours |

During the 2020–21 Scottish football season, Forfar Athletic F.C. competed in Scottish League One, the third tier of the Scottish football league system. It was the club's fourth season in the division after achieving promotion from Scottish League Two in the 2016–17 season. With a record of four wins, five draws, and thirteen losses, Forfar finished tenth and last in League One and were relegated to League Two for the 2021–22 season. The club entered the season with Stuart Malcolm as manager, but a poor run of results between December 2020 and April 2021 led to his resignation after seventeen months in charge. He was replaced by defender Gary Irvine, who was appointed on 9 April in a player-manager role for the rest of the season.

In addition to competing in League One, Forfar participated in two national cup competitions. In the Scottish Cup the club were knocked out in the fourth round by Dundee United, while in the Scottish League Cup they were eliminated following the conclusion of the opening group stage. The Scottish Challenge Cup, in which Forfar were eliminated in the second round in the 2019–20 competition, was not held in the 2020–21 season.

The 2020–21 season was the second in a row to be affected by the ongoing COVID-19 pandemic. The Scottish Challenge Cup was cancelled in October due to national restrictions on social gatherings, and several positive COVID-19 cases led to both the forfeiture of Forfar's League Cup match against Dundee in October and the postponement of a League One match versus Clyde in December. Rising numbers of COVID-19 cases across Scotland over the winter months later forced the postponement of all League One and cup matches between January and March 2021. Upon the resumption of play in late March all ten League One clubs agreed to play a shortened schedule of 22 games, down from the planned 27.

== Background ==
Forfar Athletic finished ninth of the ten competing teams in the 2019–20 Scottish League One, the third tier of Scottish football. Originally scheduled to run from July 2019 to May 2020, the 2019–20 season was curtailed by the COVID-19 pandemic, whose emergence and spread throughout Scotland resulted in the Scottish Football Association and the Scottish Professional Football League (SPFL) suspending all football competitions in the country on 13 March 2020. The SPFL subsequently announced on 15 April that League One, along with the second-tier Scottish Championship and fourth-tier Scottish League Two, would not resume later in the year following agreement between a majority of SPFL clubs. Other competitions with outstanding fixtures left to play were either rescheduled to later in 2020, as in the case of the Scottish Cup, or cancelled entirely, as with the Scottish Challenge Cup.

Due to the premature conclusion to the 2019–20 season, the final standings of all clubs across the SPFL were determined on a points-per-game basis taken at the time of suspension. Having amassed 24 points from the 28 matches played prior to the league's suspension, Forfar ended the season with a points-per-game ratio of 0.857, a tally that saw the club finish in ninth position. As the ninth-placed team, Forfar would have ordinarily contested the League One play-off final against the qualifying team of League Two to determine which side would play in the third tier for the following season. However, as per the agreement to terminate the 2019–20 season early, all play-off matches across the SPFL were cancelled to avoid delaying the start of the 2020–21 season. As a result, Forfar were automatically listed by the SPFL as a member of League One for the 2020–21 season.

In September, chairman Ross Graham stepped down from his position after two years. The club named Scott Murdie as his replacement.

=== Pre-season impact of the COVID-19 pandemic ===
In July 2020 Forfar and the other League One clubs agreed to a proposal with the SPFL to play a shorter campaign for the 2020–21 season. The upcoming league schedule would therefore consist of 27 games, nine fewer than the 36 played in previous years, with each side playing one another three times instead of the usual four. These decisions followed a similar agreement made between the SPFL and clubs of the Scottish Championship, whose planned October start to the season was proposed to "offset concerns about the cost of coronavirus testing and the practicalities of complying with return-to-training protocols," which at the time prevented Forfar and other teams below the top-tier Scottish Premiership from organising training sessions. On 3 July the SPFL confirmed that the opening League One matches for the forthcoming season would take place on 17 October. Because this date was several weeks after the 1 August opener for the Premiership, the transfer window for Scotland was accordingly altered to run from 14 July to 5 October to accommodate the staggered starts across the SPFL divisions.

On 2 October 2020, the SPFL announced that the Scottish Challenge Cup would not take place in the 2020–21 season. The decision was made after to a majority of competing clubs agreed to cancel the tournament in light of the COVID-19 restrictions in place in Scotland, which then forbade crowds from attending outdoor sporting events. The cup, which had been introduced for the 1990–91 season to commemorate the 100th anniversary of the founding of the Scottish Football League, typically featured the 30 clubs in the SPFL's lower three divisions and teams from the fifth-tier Highland and Lowland Leagues. In the 2019–20 edition of the Challenge Cup, Forfar had been defeated by Montrose in the second round.

== Scottish League One ==
=== October–February ===
Forfar opened the 2020–21 league season on 17 October with a 0–0 draw at home against Dumbarton, a game which the Daily Record newspaper described as largely "high on effort but low on excitement". A 1–1 draw away at Falkirk followed one week later with Jordan Allan equalising from a second-half penalty kick after the hosts had their goalkeeper sent off. Forfar's third game of the season was a narrow loss to Montrose at Station Park on 31 October. Two second half goals from Allan and Christian Antoniazzi twice brought Forfar level before Montrose's Liam Callaghan struck an injury time winner to seal a 3–2 victory for the visitors. The team's next league match on 6 November saw the club concede three goals to no reply against newly promoted Cove Rangers, the first of which came just four minutes after kick-off. Two weeks later Antoniazzi was the club's only goalscorer in a 3–1 home loss to Airdrieonians, a match which saw all four of the game's goals scored within the first 27 minutes. The result marked Forfar's third consecutive defeat and left the club in last place and as the only League One team not to have recorded a victory after five games. This statistic was however remedied in the next match on 28 November away at Peterhead, where midfielder Bobby Barr scored a first-half header to secure Forfar's first victory of the season and lift the club off the bottom of the table.

At the beginning of December a series of positive COVID-19 cases was discovered among the staff of Clyde F.C. This cluster of cases resulted in the postponement of Forfar's scheduled away fixture on 4 December against the Cumbernauld club, which due to the mandatory self-isolation rules in place lacked the minimum number of fit players required to play. Forfar's fixture a fortnight later, played away at East Fife on 19 December, saw the team create few attacking opportunities in a 2–0 defeat; the match report by local news website Fife Today nevertheless suggested that the scoreline flattered Forfar and commented "the only surprise was that it took East Fife almost half an hour to turn their dominance into a goal". The club's final league game of 2020 was a 1–0 home loss to Cove Rangers in what The Press and Journal newspaper described as a "comfortable" win for the Aberdeen visitors.

On 11 January 2021 the league was suspended for three weeks due to the COVID-19 pandemic. At the time of suspension, Forfar were placed last in League One having scored just six points from the ten games played. In late January the suspension was extended until 14 February at the earliest, and following the Scottish Football Association's desire to see a reduced number of COVID-19 cases nationwide before play was resumed, again until at least 1 March.

=== March to April ===
On 2 March the SPFL was given permission by the Scottish Government for clubs below the Premiership level to resume training. Following agreement from all clubs the League One season was reduced from 27 games to 22 in mid-March. Despite this reduction Forfar still faced a crowded fixture list for the end of the season, and the club would end up playing ten games over thirty days between the end of March and the end of April. This decision later criticised by goalkeeper Marc McCallum for putting excessive strain on the semi-professional players of Leagues One and Two, many of whom held second jobs outside of the sport.

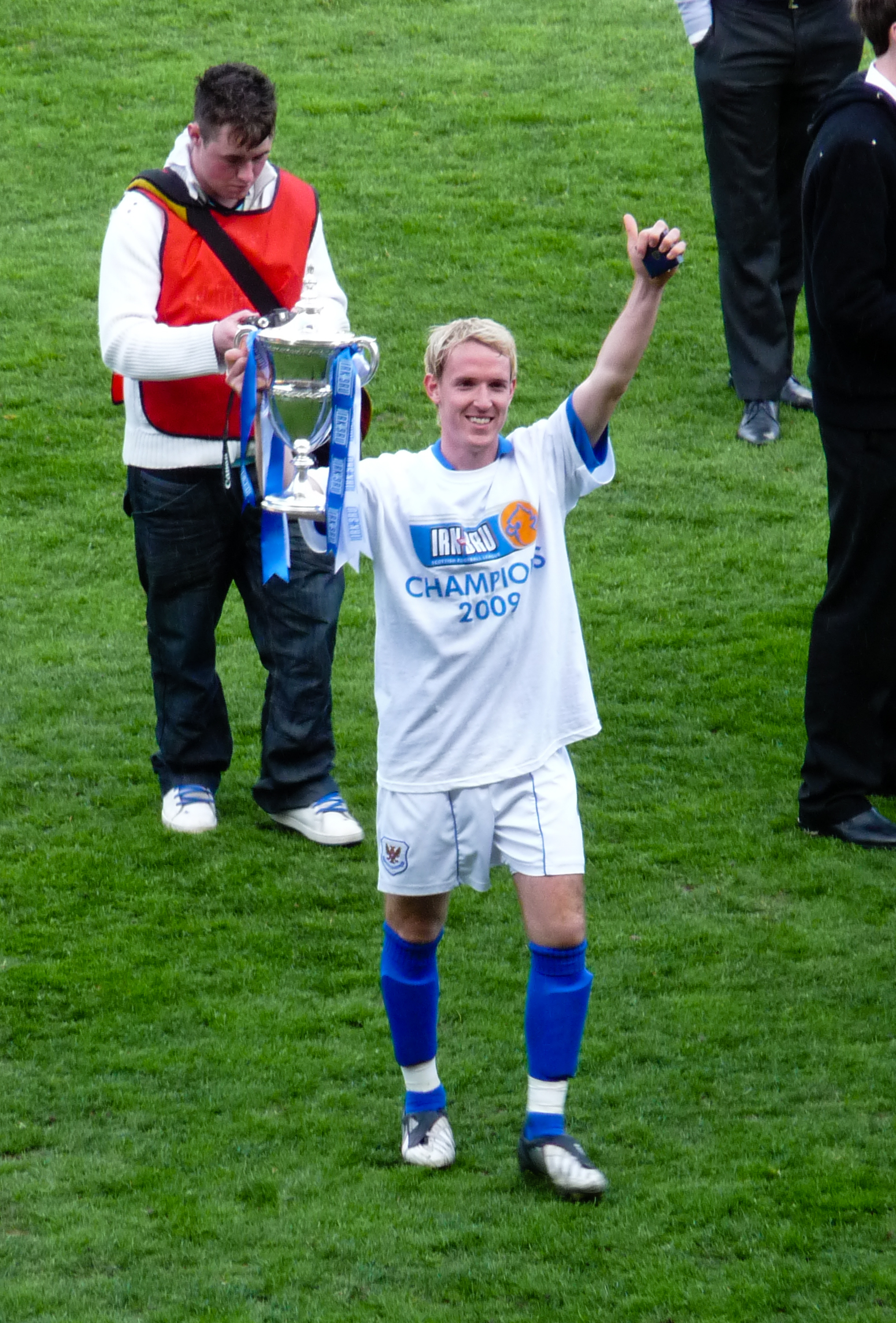
Defender Gary Irvine (pictured in 2013 with St. Johnstone) was appointed caretaker manager of Forfar Athletic on 9 April and later as full-time manager on 4 May

Ahead of their first game of the resumed season on 20 March, the club announced that it had acquired midfielder Callum Moore on loan from Dundee for the remainder of the season. The first match of the resumed season saw Forfar defeat Dumbarton 1–0 after an own goal by Dumbarton defender Ryan McGeever, who was struck on the back by the ball in an attempted goal kick from teammate Sam Ramsbottom. Seven days later the club suffered a 2–0 home defeat to Falkirk after mistakes by goalkeeper McCallum allowed the visitors to break down what the Falkirk Herald acknowledged was a strong defensive display by Forfar. The newspaper nevertheless noted that the team "provided little threat" in attack, with any offensive chances largely limited to the counter-attack. The club's next match on 30 March at Partick Thistle ended in a 2–2 draw after title-chasing Partick twice equalised following two first half goals from Scott Fenwick.

On 8 April Forfar were defeated 3–0 by Clyde, a result which left the club five points behind the ninth-place relegation play-off spot with seven league games left to play. Following the match manager Stuart Malcolm and his two assistants resigned after seventeen months in charge, a decision which the club "reluctantly" accepted. Defender Gary Irvine assumed the coaching position for Forfar's next game against East Fife in a player-coach role. Tony Docherty, who was the assistant manager at Aberdeen F.C. from 2013 until the previous month, later joined Irvine for the remainder of the season.

By 27 April Forfar had fallen to nine points behind ninth-placed Clyde following a 1–0 loss to Dumbarton. With only nine points available from the remaining three games the club were described as "all but relegated" by BBC Sport, and they entered the season's final fixtures having achieved just two victories in nineteen league matches. Despite back-to-back wins against Clyde and Peterhead in the next two games, Clyde's own victory over Dumbarton in the penultimate match of the season confirmed Forfar's relegation to Scottish League Two, ending the club's four-season stint in Scotland's third tier. The two victories nevertheless prompted the club to promote Irvine from caretaker manager to manager three days later on 4 May. Forfar's final game of the season was a home loss to East Fife, an encounter noted by the website Fife Today as "competitive, spirited and not short on quality", with Sean Brown securing a 3–2 victory for the away side in the last minute of the match.

=== League table ===
| Pos | Team | Pld | W | D | L | GF | GA | GD | Pts | Promotion, qualification or relegation |
|---|---|---|---|---|---|---|---|---|---|---|
| 6 | East Fife | 22 | 10 | 3 | 9 | 30 | 33 | −3 | 33 | |
| 7 | Peterhead | 22 | 9 | 2 | 11 | 24 | 27 | −3 | 29 | |
| 8 | Clyde | 22 | 8 | 2 | 12 | 27 | 38 | −11 | 26 | |
| 9 | Dumbarton (O) | 22 | 7 | 4 | 11 | 14 | 24 | −10 | 25 | Qualification for the League One play-offs |
| 10 | Forfar Athletic (R) | 22 | 4 | 5 | 13 | 18 | 37 | −19 | 17 | Relegation to League Two |

Source: SPFL
Rules for classification: 1) Points; 2) Goal difference; 3) Goals scored; 4) Head-to-to head points; 5) Head-to-head goal difference; 6) Play-off (only for deciding promotion, play-off participation and relegation).
(O) Play-off winners; (R) Relegated

=== Results summary ===
| Overall | | | | | | | | Home | | | | | | Away | | | | | |
| Pld | W | D | L | GF | GA | GD | Pts | W | D | L | GF | GA | GD | W | D | L | GF | GA | GD |
|---|---|---|---|---|---|---|---|---|---|---|---|---|---|---|---|---|---|---|---|
| 22 | 4 | 5 | 13 | 18 | 37 | −19 | 17 | 1 | 2 | 8 | 10 | 21 | −11 | 3 | 3 | 5 | 8 | 16 | −8 |

=== Match results ===
Key: Win Draw Loss

| 17 October 2020 1 | Forfar Athletic | 0 – 0 | Dumbarton | Forfar |
| 15:00 GMT | | Report | | Stadium: Station Park; Referee: Peter Stuart |

| 24 October 2020 2 | Falkirk | 1 – 1 | Forfar Athletic | Falkirk |
| 15:00 GMT | Dowds 15' | Report | Allan 66' | Stadium: Falkirk Stadium; Referee: Steven Kirkland |

| 31 October 2020 3 | Forfar Athletic | 2 – 3 | Montrose | Forfar |
| 15:00 GMT | Allan 60'; Antoniazzi 80' | Report | Watson 30', 63'; Callaghan 90+3' | Stadium: Station Park; Referee: Lloyd Wilson |

| 7 November 2020 4 | Cove Rangers | 3 – 0 | Forfar Athletic | Aberdeen |
| 15:00 GMT | McAllister 4'; Megginson 43', 61' | Report | | Stadium: Balmoral Stadium; Referee: Scott Lambie |

| 21 November 2020 5 | Forfar Athletic | 1 – 3 | Airdrieonians | Forfar |
| 15:00 GMT | Antoniazzi 23' | Report | Robert 6'; Carrick 21' (pen.); Connell 27' | Stadium: Station Park; Referee: Grant Irvine |

| 28 November 2020 6 | Peterhead | 0 – 1 | Forfar Athletic | Peterhead |
| 15:00 GMT | | Report | Barr 44' | Stadium: Balmoor Stadium; Referee: Gavin Ross |

| 12 December 2020 7 | Forfar Athletic | 0 – 2 | Partick Thistle | Forfar |
| 15:00 GMT | | Report | Gordon 52'; Dochety 78' | Stadium: Station Park; Referee: Gavin Ross |

| 19 December 2020 8 | East Fife | 2 – 0 | Forfar Athletic | Methil |
| 15:00 GMT | Hamilton 28'; Denholm 59' | Report | | Stadium: Locality Hub Bayview Stadium; Referee: Peter Stuart |

| 26 December 2020 9 | Forfar Athletic | 0 – 1 | Cove Rangers | Forfar |
| 15:00 GMT | | Report | Megginson 64' | Stadium: Station Park; Referee: David Lowe |

| 2 January 2021 10 | Montrose | 0 – 0 | Forfar Athletic | Montrose |
| 15:00 GMT | | Report | | Stadium: Links Park; Referee: Scott Lambie |

| 20 March 2021 11 | Dumbarton | 0 – 1 | Forfar Athletic | Dumbarton |
| 15:00 BST | | Report | McGeever 57' (o.g.) | Stadium: C&G Systems Stadium; Referee: Kevin Graham |

| 27 March 2021 12 | Forfar Athletic | 0 – 2 | Falkirk | Forfar |
| 15:00 BST | | Report | Telfer 25'; Alston 48' | Stadium: Station Park; Referee: Steven Reid |

| 30 March 2021 13 | Partick Thistle | 2 – 2 | Forfar Athletic | Glasgow |
| 19:00 BST | Murray 16'; Graham 66' | Report | Fenwick 2', 44' | Stadium: Firhill Stadium; Referee: David Lowe |

| 6 April 2021 14 | Forfar Athletic | 1 – 1 | Peterhead | Peterhead |
| 19:00 BST | Scott 86' | Report | Ritchie 61' | Stadium: Balmoor Stadium; Referee: Chris Graham |

| 8 April 2021 15 | Clyde | 3 – 0 | Forfar Athletic | Cumbernauld |
| 19:00 BST | Goodwillie 18', 44'; Howie 51' | Report | | Stadium: Broadwood Stadium; Referee: Graham Grainger |

| 10 April 2021 16 | Forfar Athletic | 1 – 2 | East Fife | Forfar |
| 15:00 BST | Allan 53' | Report | Wallace 25'; Smith 61' | Stadium: Station Park; Referee: Duncan Williams |

| 13 April 2021 17 | Airdrieonians | 3 – 1 | Forfar Athletic | Airdrie |
| 19:05 BST | Thomson 2' (o.g.); Gallagher 82'; Connell 90+4' | Report | Anderson 43' | Stadium: Penny Cars Stadium; Referee: Barry Cook |

| 20 April 2021 18 | Forfar Athletic | 1 – 3 | Clyde | Forfar |
| 19:45 BST | Fenwick 38' | Report | Jamieson 39', 61'; Jack 82' | Stadium: Station Park; Referee: Kevin Graham |

| 27 April 2021 19 | Dumbarton | 1 – 0 | Forfar Athletic | Dumbarton |
| 19:00 BST | Duthie 88' | Report | | Stadium: C&G Systems Stadium; Referee: Matthew MacDermid |

| 29 April 2021 20 | Forfar Athletic | 2 – 1 | Clyde | Forfar |
| 19:00 BST | Scally 35', 90+2' | Report | Goodwillie 11' | Stadium: Station Park; Referee: Duncan Williams |

| 1 May 2021 21 | Peterhead | 1 – 2 | Forfar Athletic | Peterhead |
| 15:00 BST | Brown 64' | Report | Strachan 56' (o.g.); Shepherd 79' | Stadium: Balmoor Stadium; Referee: Mike Roncone |

| 4 May 2021 22 | Forfar Athletic | 2 – 3 | East Fife | Forfar |
| 15:00 BST | Fenwick 11'; Scally 48' | Report | Davidson 14'; Murdoch 50'; Brown 90' | Stadium: Station Park; Referee: Barry Cook |

== Scottish Cup ==
The Scottish Cup is a single-elimination tournament competition open to all clubs who are full members of the Scottish Football Association; this includes the Scottish Professional Football League, the Highland Football League, and the Lowland Football League. First contested in 1873–74, it is the second oldest association football tournament in the world after the FA Cup in England. As a member of Scottish League One, Forfar entered the cup in the second round.

Forfar's first match of the cup was a home win against Linlithgow Rose of the Lowland League, who were defeated in extra time. For the third round held in early April Forfar were drawn at home against League Two side Edinburgh City. Having had Hamish Thomson sent off earlier in the game, Forfar were rescued by defender Roberto Nditi's 94th-minute goal that levelled the scoreline at 2–2 and forced the match into extra time. The game subsequently went to a penalty shoot-out, where goalkeeper Daniel Hoban saved Edinburgh's fourth penalty kick and forward Daniel Scally scored Forfar's fifth to see the club into the fourth round. Held two weeks later on 16 April, Forfar's fourth round opponents were Premiership side Dundee United at Station Park. Despite a strong opening 25 minutes the club failed to capitalise on their chances in the first half, and a goal by Dundee's Peter Pawlett eleven minutes into the second half was enough to send the visitors into the quarter-finals in a 1–0 victory. In their post-match report the BBC nevertheless described Forfar as the side who "emerged with the most credit" in reflection of the club's congested schedule in mid-April, which had seen the club play five matches in eleven days.

=== Match results ===
Key: Win Loss

| 9 January 2021 Second round | Forfar Athletic | 4 – 1 (a.e.t.) | Linlithgow Rose | Forfar |
| 15:00 GMT | MacKintosh 14'; Fotheringham 95', 101'; Allan 103' | Report | Wilson 11' | Stadium: Station Park |

| 3 April 2021 Third round | Forfar Athletic | 2 – 2 (a.e.t.) (5–3 p) | Edinburgh City | Forfar |
| 15:00 BST | Allan 13'; Nditi 90+3' | Report | See 6'; Hamilton 25' | Stadium: Station Park |
| | Penalties |
| | Meechan (penalty scored); Doris (penalty scored); Shepherd (penalty scored); Fenwick (penalty scored); Scally (penalty scored) | | (penalty scored) L. Henderson; (penalty scored) Brown; (penalty scored) Laird; (penalty missed) Thomson |

| 16 April 2021 Fourth round | Forfar Athletic | 0 – 1 | Dundee United | Forfar |
| 19:45 BST | | Report | Pawlett 56' | Stadium: Station Park |

== Scottish League Cup ==
The Scottish League Cup is a competition open to all clubs who are members of the Scottish Professional Football League. The cup began with a group stage consisting of eight groups of five teams divided geographically into northern and southern sections. The winners of each group plus the four runners-up with the best record would advance to the next round where a single-elimination tournament would determine the winner. Forfar were drawn with Hibernian, Dundee, Brora Rangers, and Cove Rangers in the northern section in Group B.

Following a positive COVID-19 test from midfielder Kyle Dalling on 6 October, Forfar forfeited their opening match scheduled that day against Dundee after being unable to guarantee there were no further cases of COVID-19 within the team prior to kick-off. As the club were unable to fulfil the fixture, Dundee were awarded a 3–0 victory. After a series of negative COVID-19 tests by the other players, with only Dalling and fellow midfielder Christian Antoniazzi entering self-isolation, the club's second League Cup fixture against Premiership side Hibernian went ahead as scheduled one week later on 13 October. Forfar lost the encounter 1–0 after Hibernian's David Gray headed in an 87th-minute goal.

Forfar's third game of the competition was against Brora Rangers of the Highland League on 10 November. The club's own official match report described the result as a "mildly disappointing 3-3 draw", with goals from Murray Mackintosh and Jordan Allan bringing Forfar level after Brora twice took the lead. Forfar won the subsequent penalty shoot-out by four goals to three. The final group game was an away fixture against Cove Rangers which saw Forfar concede two penalties in the second half. Goalkeeper Daniel Hoban was successful in saving the first effort but later fouled Cove striker Rory McAllister in the penalty area, who scored his team's second penalty to secure a 1–0 victory. Forfar's results saw them finish last within Group B and fail to advance to the next round.

=== Group B table ===
| Pos | Team | Pld | W | PW | PL | L | GF | GA | GD | Pts | Qualification | HIB | DUN | COV | BRO | FOR |
|---|---|---|---|---|---|---|---|---|---|---|---|---|---|---|---|---|
| 1 | Hibernian | 4 | 4 | 0 | 0 | 0 | 10 | 3 | +7 | 12 | Qualification for the Second round | — | 4–1 | — | 3–1 | — |
| 2 | Dundee | 4 | 3 | 0 | 0 | 1 | 9 | 4 | +5 | 9 | Qualification for the Second round | — | — | 3–0 | — | 3–0 |
| 3 | Cove Rangers | 4 | 1 | 1 | 0 | 2 | 4 | 7 | −3 | 5 | | 1–2 | — | — | — | 1–0 |
| 4 | Brora Rangers | 4 | 0 | 0 | 2 | 2 | 6 | 10 | −4 | 2 | | — | 0–2 | 2–2p | — | — |
| 5 | Forfar Athletic | 4 | 0 | 1 | 0 | 3 | 3 | 8 | −5 | 2 | | 0–1 | — | — | p3–3 | — |

Rules for classification: 1) points, 2) goal difference, 3) goals scored, 4) away goals scored, 5) matches won, 6) away matches won, 7) drawing of lots.

=== Match results ===
Key: Win Loss

| 6 October 2020 Group stage | Dundee | 3 – 0 | Forfar Athletic | Dundee |
| 19:45 BST | | Report | | Stadium: Dens Park |
Note: Forfar Athletic forfeited the match after failing to provide a squad following a positive COVID-19 test. Dundee were awarded a 3–0 win.

| 13 October 2020 Group stage | Forfar Athletic | 0 – 1 | Hibernian | Forfar |
| 19:45 BST | | Report | Gray 87' | Stadium: Station Park; Referee: David Munro |

| 10 November 2020 Group stage | Forfar Athletic | 3 – 3 (4–3 p) | Brora Rangers | Forfar |
| 19:45 GMT | MacKintosh 34', 81'; Allan 87' | Report | Irvine 42' (o.g.); MacLean 52'; J. MacRae 84' | Stadium: Station Park; Referee: Grant Irvine |
| | Penalties |
| | Allan (penalty missed); Shepherd (penalty scored); Barr (penalty scored); Breadner (penalty scored); Antoniazzi (penalty scored) | | Nicolson (penalty scored); Brindle (penalty missed); A. MacRae (penalty scored); J. MacRae (penalty scored); MacLean (penalty missed) |

| 14 November 2020 Group stage | Cove Rangers | 1 – 0 | Forfar Athletic | Aberdeen |
| 15:00 GMT | McAllister 68' (pen.) | Report | | Stadium: Balmoral Stadium; Referee: Duncan Williams |
