= 2020–21 Hibernian F.C. season =

Hibernian
2020–21 season
- Chairman: Ron Gordon
- Manager: Jack Ross
- Stadium: Easter Road
- Premiership: 3rd
- Scottish Cup: Runners-up
- League Cup: Semi-finals
- Top goalscorer: League: Kevin Nisbet (14); All: Kevin Nisbet (18)
Home colours	Away colours	Third colours

The 2020–21 season was Hibernian's fourth season of play back in the top flight of Scottish football, having been promoted from the Scottish Championship at the end of the 2016–17 season. Hibs lost in the semi-finals of the League Cup to St Johnstone, and in the 2021 Scottish Cup Final to the same opponents. Hibs finished third in the Premiership, which was their highest league position since 2004–05.

== Results and fixtures ==
Win Draw Loss Postponed

=== Friendlies ===
Due to government rules introduced during the coronavirus pandemic, Hibs were restricted in their pre-season activities. Contact training was only permitted from Monday 29 June, and Hibs played only against other Premiership clubs during pre-season. One of those training matches had to be called off due to a delay in obtaining coronavirus test results.

11 July 2020 Friendly	Hibernian	1–1	St Mirren	Ormiston
	Gullan	Edinburgh Live	Henderson	Stadium: Hibernian Training Centre; Attendance: None (Note: Attendance restricted due to COVID-19 pandemic regulations.)

14 July 2020 Friendly	St Johnstone	0–0	Hibernian	Perth
		Edinburgh Live		Stadium: McDiarmid Park; Attendance: None

18 July 2020 Friendly	Hibernian	A–A	Ross County	Ormiston
				Stadium: Hibernian Training Centre; Attendance: None

21 July 2020 Friendly	Hibernian	2–1	Hamilton Academical	Edinburgh
	Nisbet; Newell	Edinburgh Live	Fjørtoft	Stadium: Easter Road; Attendance: None

25 July 2020 Friendly	Aberdeen	1–1	Hibernian	Aberdeen
	Bryson	Edinburgh Evening News	Horgan	Stadium: Pittodrie Stadium; Attendance: None

27 July 2020 Friendly	Celtic	3–1	Hibernian	Glasgow
13:30 BST	Dembélé 41'; Klimala 78', 83'	Celtic FC	Doig 14'	Stadium: Celtic Park; Attendance: None

=== Scottish Premiership ===
Hibs won their first three games of the season, the first time they had done this in the top division of the Scottish football league system since 1974–75. A 1–0 win at Aberdeen in the penultimate match clinched third place for Hibs, which was their highest finishing position since 2004–05. The win at Aberdeen was their 11th away from home in the league, which set a new club record for a season in the top division.

1 August 2020 1	Hibernian	2–1	Kilmarnock	Edinburgh
15:00 BST	Boyle 5', 34'	BBC Sport	Burke 44'	Stadium: Easter Road; Attendance: None; Referee: John Beaton

8 August 2020 2	Livingston	1–4	Hibernian	Livingston
15:00 BST	Dykes 60' (pen.)	BBC Sport	Nisbet 24', 37', 88' (pen.); Doidge 41'	Stadium: Almondvale Stadium; Attendance: None; Referee: Euan Anderson

11 August 2020 3	Dundee United	0–1	Hibernian	Dundee
18:00 BST		BBC Sport	Doidge 65'	Stadium: Tannadice Park; Attendance: None; Referee: Don Robertson

15 August 2020 4	Hibernian	0–0	Motherwell	Edinburgh
17:30 BST		BBC Sport		Stadium: Easter Road; Attendance: None; Referee: Greg Aitken

23 August 2020 5	St Johnstone	0–1	Hibernian	Perth
16:30 BST		BBC Sport	Mallan 90+1' (pen.)	Stadium: McDiarmid Park; Attendance: None; Referee: John Beaton

30 August 2020 6	Hibernian	0–1	Aberdeen	Edinburgh
16:30 BST		BBC Sport	Ferguson 39' (pen.)	Stadium: Easter Road; Attendance: None; Referee: Nick Walsh

12 September 2020 7	St Mirren	0–3	Hibernian	Paisley
15:00 BST		BBC Sport	Nisbet 14'; Newell 17'; Boyle 59'	Stadium: St Mirren Park; Attendance: None; Referee: Willie Collum

20 September 2020 8	Hibernian	2–2	Rangers	Edinburgh
12:00 BST	Wright 22'; Doidge 71'	BBC Sport	Morelos 45+1'; Arfield 57'	Stadium: Easter Road; Attendance: None; Referee: Don Robertson

27 September 2020 9	Celtic	3–0	Hibernian	Glasgow
15:00 BST	McGregor 7'; Ajeti 35'; Elyounoussi 79'	BBC Sport		Stadium: Celtic Park; Attendance: None; Referee: Steven McLean

2 October 2020 10	Hibernian	3–2	Hamilton Academical	Edinburgh
19:45 BST	Nisbet 19', 35'; Hanlon 63'	BBC Sport	Callachan 75' (pen.); Porteous 84' (o.g.)	Stadium: Easter Road; Attendance: None; Referee: Bobby Madden

17 October 2020 11	Ross County	0–0	Hibernian	Dingwall
15:00 BST		BBC Sport		Stadium: Victoria Park; Attendance: None; Referee: Nick Walsh

24 October 2020 12	Kilmarnock	0–1	Hibernian	Kilmarnock
15:00 BST		BBC Sport	Nisbet 27' (pen.)	Stadium: Rugby Park; Attendance: None; Referee: Colin Steven

6 November 2020 13	Aberdeen	2–0	Hibernian	Aberdeen
19:45 GMT	Wright 5'; Cosgrove 12'	BBC Sport		Stadium: Pittodrie Stadium; Attendance: None; Referee: Euan Anderson

21 November 2020 14	Hibernian	2–2	Celtic	Edinburgh
15:00 GMT	Murphy 52'; Nisbet 59'	BBC Sport	Edouard 79' (pen.); Laxalt 90+1'	Stadium: Easter Road; Attendance: None; Referee: Bobby Madden

24 November 2020 15	Hibernian	2–2	St Johnstone	Edinburgh
19:00 GMT	P. McGinn 36', 83'	BBC Sport	McCann 35'; Wotherspoon 76'	Stadium: Easter Road; Attendance: None; Referee: Kevin Clancy

5 December 2020 16	Motherwell	0–3	Hibernian	Motherwell
15:00 GMT		BBC Sport	Boyle 59'; Doidge 88'; S. McGinn 90+5'	Stadium: Fir Park; Attendance: None; Referee: Andrew Dallas

12 December 2020 17	Hamilton Academical	0–4	Hibernian	Hamilton
15:00 GMT		BBC Sport	Boyle 10' (pen.); Doidge 39'; P. McGinn 65'; Nisbet 68'	Stadium: New Douglas Park; Attendance: None; Referee: Kevin Clancy

19 December 2020 18	Hibernian	1–1	Dundee United	Edinburgh
15:00 GMT	Magennis 13'	BBC Sport	Bolton 90+1'	Stadium: Easter Road; Attendance: None; Referee: Gavin Duncan

23 December 2020 19	Hibernian	1–0	St Mirren	Edinburgh
18:00 GMT	Nisbet 18'	BBC Sport		Stadium: Easter Road; Attendance: None; Referee: Steven Kirkland

26 December 2020 20	Rangers	1–0	Hibernian	Glasgow
12:30 GMT	Hagi 33'	BBC Sport		Stadium: Ibrox Stadium; Attendance: None; Referee: Willie Collum

30 December 2020 21	Hibernian	0–2	Ross County	Edinburgh
18:00 GMT		BBC Sport	Paton 25'; Shaw 76'	Stadium: Easter Road; Attendance: None; Referee: Don Robertson

2 January 2021 22	Hibernian	0–3	Livingston	Edinburgh
15:00 GMT		BBC Sport	Mullin 9'; Guthrie 16'; Robinson 47'	Stadium: Easter Road; Attendance: None; Referee: David Munro

11 January 2021 23	Celtic	1–1	Hibernian	Glasgow
19:45 GMT	Turnbull 82'	BBC Sport	Nisbet 90+1'	Stadium: Celtic Park; Attendance: None; Referee: Nick Walsh

16 January 2021 24	Hibernian	2–0	Kilmarnock	Edinburgh
15:00 GMT	Power 51' (o.g.); Gogic 80'	BBC Sport		Stadium: Easter Road; Attendance: None; Referee: Willie Collum

27 January 2021 25	Hibernian	0–1	Rangers	Edinburgh
19:45 GMT		BBC Sport	Morelos 51'	Stadium: Easter Road; Attendance: None; Referee: Kevin Clancy

30 January 2021 26	Dundee United	0–2	Hibernian	Dundee
15:00 GMT		BBC Sport	McGregor 21'; Boyle 69'	Stadium: Tannadice Park; Attendance: None; Referee: Gavin Duncan

2 February 2021 27	St Mirren	1–2	Hibernian	Paisley
18:00 GMT	Obika 74'	BBC Sport	Porteous 55'; Boyle 71' (pen.)	Stadium: St Mirren Park; Attendance: None; Referee: Alan Muir

6 February 2021 28	Hibernian	2–0	Aberdeen	Edinburgh
15:00 GMT	Boyle 27' (pen.), 67'	BBC Sport		Stadium: Easter Road; Attendance: None; Referee: Willie Collum

20 February 2021 29	Hibernian	2–0	Hamilton Academical	Edinburgh
15:00 GMT	Boyle 13'; Doig 70'	BBC Sport		Stadium: Easter Road; Attendance: None; Referee: Craig Napier

27 February 2021 30	Hibernian	0–2	Motherwell	Edinburgh
15:00 GMT		BBC Sport	Roberts 25'; Cole 46'	Stadium: Easter Road; Attendance: None; Referee: Alan Muir

6 March 2021 31	St Johnstone	1–0	Hibernian	Perth
15:00 GMT	Craig 16'	BBC Sport		Stadium: McDiarmid Park; Attendance: None; Referee: David Dickinson

13 March 2021 32	Ross County	1–2	Hibernian	Dingwall
15:00 GMT	Mckay 50'	BBC Sport	Boyle 52' (pen.); Nisbet 60'	Stadium: Victoria Park; Attendance: None; Referee: John Beaton

20 March 2021 33	Livingston	1–1	Hibernian	Livingston
15:00 GMT	Sibbald 28'	BBC Sport	Doidge 41'	Stadium: Almondvale Stadium; Attendance: None; Referee: Nick Walsh

11 April 2021 34	Rangers	2–1	Hibernian	Glasgow
15:00 BST	Aribo 20'; Kent 62'	BBC Sport	Nisbet 78'	Stadium: Ibrox Stadium; Attendance: None; Referee: Don Robertson

21 April 2021 35	Hibernian	2–1	Livingston	Edinburgh
19:45 BST	Nisbet 8'; Boyle 26' (pen.)	BBC Sport	Emmanuel-Thomas 85' (pen.)	Stadium: Easter Road; Attendance: None; Referee: Craig Napier

1 May 2021 36	Hibernian	0–1	St Johnstone	Edinburgh
15:00 BST		BBC Sport	Middleton 22'	Stadium: Easter Road; Attendance: None; Referee: Greg Aitken

12 May 2021 37	Aberdeen	0–1	Hibernian	Aberdeen
19:45 BST		BBC Sport	Doidge 41'	Stadium: Pittodrie Stadium; Attendance: None; Referee: John Beaton

15 May 2021 38	Hibernian	0–0	Celtic	Edinburgh
12:30 BST		BBC Sport		Stadium: Easter Road; Attendance: None; Referee: Willie Collum

=== Scottish Cup ===
Hibs entered the 2020–21 competition at the third round stage (last 32), and were drawn away to Championship club Queen of the South. The tie was delayed until April because the lower divisions of the SPFL were suspended for much of the winter due to the COVID-19 pandemic. Hibs progressed to the fourth round, where they were given another away tie against League Two club Stranraer. Due to the condensed schedule the draws for the fourth round and quarter-finals were made at the same time; a 4–0 win at Stranraer gave Hibs a home tie with Motherwell. Hibs lost a two-goal lead late in normal time against Motherwell, but progressed to the semi-finals by winning a penalty shootout. Hibs beat Dundee United 2–0 in the semi-final, their first victory at that stage of a cup competition (after five successive defeats) since 2016. In the final Hibs lost 1–0 to St Johnstone, which meant that the Perth club won a cup double.

5 April 2021 Third round	Queen of the South	1–3	Hibernian	Dumfries
19:45 BST	Maxwell 80'	BBC Sport	Doidge 42', 67'; Boyle 70'	Stadium: Palmerston Park; Attendance: None; Referee: Willie Collum

18 April 2021 Fourth round	Stranraer	0–4	Hibernian	Stranraer
12:15 BST		BBC Sport	Doidge 37'; Nisbet 64'; Boyle 71', 84' (pen.)	Stadium: Stair Park; Attendance: None; Referee: David Munro

24 April 2021 Quarter-final	Hibernian	2–2 (a.e.t.) (4–2 p)	Motherwell	Edinburgh
17:00 BST	Doidge 52'; Irvine 80'	BBC Sport	Lamie 82'; Watt 88'	Stadium: Easter Road; Attendance: None; Referee: John Beaton

8 May 2021 Semi-final	Dundee United	0–2	Hibernian	Glasgow
16:00 BST		BBC Sport	Nisbet 27'; Doidge 58'	Stadium: Hampden Park; Attendance: None; Referee: Bobby Madden

22 May 2021 Final	St Johnstone	1–0	Hibernian	Glasgow
14:00 BST	Rooney 32'	BBC Sport		Stadium: Hampden Park; Attendance: None; Referee: Nick Walsh

=== Scottish League Cup ===
Hibs were drawn into Group B of the League Cup group stage, along with Dundee, Forfar Athletic, Brora Rangers and Cove Rangers. Hibs and Dundee both progressed to the last 16, where they were drawn against each other again. A 1–0 win in the rematch put Hibs into the quarter-finals, where they were drawn away to Championship side Alloa Athletic. Hibs came from behind to win 2–1 at Alloa, and were then paired with St Johnstone in the semi-finals. Hibs lost that match 3–0, thereby losing an opportunity to win a competition in which they had become favourites as the Old Firm clubs had been knocked out in earlier rounds. Manager Jack Ross said he was "angry" at the way the team had fallen out of the game in the second half.

==== Group stage ====
7 October 2020 1	Hibernian	3–1	Brora Rangers	Edinburgh
19:45 BST	Mallan 8', 12'; Hanlon 89'	BBC Sport	Gillespie 61'	Stadium: Easter Road; Attendance: None; Referee: Alan Muir

10 October 2020 2	Cove Rangers	1–2	Hibernian	Cove Bay
12:30 BST	Higgins 17'	BBC Sport	Gullan 49'; Nisbet 60'	Stadium: Balmoral Stadium; Attendance: None; Referee: Euan Anderson

13 October 2020 3	Forfar Athletic	0–1	Hibernian	Forfar
19:45 BST		BBC Sport	Gray 87'	Stadium: Station Park; Attendance: None; Referee: David Munro

15 November 2020 4	Hibernian	4–1	Dundee	Edinburgh
16:30 GMT	Mallan 10'; Nisbet 76'; Gullan 80'; Hallberg 82'	BBC Sport	Elliott 71'	Stadium: Easter Road; Attendance: None; Referee: John Beaton

==== Knockout phase ====
28 November 2020 Second round	Hibernian	1–0	Dundee	Edinburgh
15:00 GMT	Murphy 45'	BBC Sport		Stadium: Easter Road; Attendance: None; Referee: Willie Collum

15 December 2020 Quarter-final	Alloa Athletic	1–2	Hibernian	Alloa
20:00 GMT	Hanlon 34' (o.g.)	BBC Sport	Doidge 62'; Jamieson 83' (o.g.)	Stadium: Recreation Park; Attendance: None; Referee: David Munro

23 January 2021 Semi-final	St Johnstone	3–0	Hibernian	Glasgow
17:30 GMT	Kerr 35'; Rooney 49'; Conway 63'	BBC Sport		Stadium: Hampden Park; Attendance: None; Referee: Nick Walsh

== Player statistics ==
Note: Statistics for the delayed 2019–20 Scottish Cup semi-final played on 31 October 2020 are recorded under the 2019–20 Hibernian F.C. season article.

As of 22 May 2021

No.	Pos	Player	Premiership		League Cup		Scottish Cup		Total	
No.	Pos	Player	Apps	Goals	Apps	Goals	Apps	Goals	Apps	Goals
Goalkeepers
1	GK	(Israel) Ofir Marciano	32	0	3	0	0	0	35	0
33	GK	(England) Dillon Barnes	4	0	4	0	0	0	8	0
33	GK	(England) Matt Macey	3	0	0	0	5	0	8	0
Defenders
2	DF	(Scotland) David Gray	2	0	3	1	0	0	5	1
4	DF	(Scotland) Paul Hanlon	37	1	4	1	5	0	46	2
5	DF	(Scotland) Ryan Porteous	34	1	3	0	5	0	42	1
6	DF	(Scotland) Paul McGinn	38	3	4	0	5	0	47	3
16	DF	(Scotland) Lewis Stevenson	22	0	3	0	3	0	28	0
24	DF	(Scotland) Darren McGregor	10	1	5	0	1	0	16	1
25	DF	(Scotland) Josh Doig	28	1	2	0	5	0	35	1
26	DF	(Scotland) Sean Mackie	2	0	3	0	0	0	5	0
Midfielders
7	MF	(Republic of Ireland) Daryl Horgan	5	0	0	0	0	0	5	0
7	MF	(Scotland) Kyle Magennis	14	1	5	0	3	0	22	1
8	MF	(England) Drey Wright	20	1	5	0	3	0	28	1
11	MF	(England) Joe Newell	32	1	3	0	5	0	40	1
13	MF	(Cyprus) Alex Gogic	34	1	1	0	3	0	38	1
14	MF	(Scotland) Stevie Mallan	14	1	6	3	0	0	20	4
20	MF	(Sweden) Melker Hallberg	25	0	6	1	4	0	35	1
22	MF	(Scotland) Stephen McGinn	5	1	4	0	0	0	9	1
23	MF	(Scotland) Scott Allan	8	0	1	0	0	0	9	0
27	MF	(Scotland) Chris Cadden	10	0	1	0	1	0	12	0
36	MF	(Australia) Jackson Irvine	15	0	1	0	5	1	21	1
43	MF	(Scotland) Steven Bradley	2	0	2	0	0	0	4	0
Forwards
9	FW	(Wales) Christian Doidge	36	7	6	1	5	5	47	13
10	FW	(Australia) Martin Boyle	36	12	7	0	5	3	48	15
15	FW	(Scotland) Kevin Nisbet	33	14	6	2	5	2	44	18
18	FW	(Scotland) Jamie Murphy	19	1	4	1	2	0	25	2
19	FW	(Scotland) Jamie Gullan	14	0	6	2	0	0	20	2
29	FW	(Scotland) Ryan Shanley	1	0	1	0	0	0	2	0

== Club statistics ==
=== League table ===
Pos	Team	Pld	W	D	L	GF	GA	GD	Pts	Qualification or relegation (Note: Teams play each other three times (33 matches), before the league is split into two groups (the top six and the bottom six).)
1	Rangers (C)	38	32	6	0	92	13	+79	102	Qualification for the Champions League third qualifying round
2	Celtic	38	22	11	5	78	29	+49	77	Qualification for the Champions League second qualifying round
3	Hibernian	38	18	9	11	48	35	+13	63	Qualification for the Europa Conference League second qualifying round
4	Aberdeen	38	15	11	12	36	38	−2	56	Qualification for the Europa Conference League second qualifying round
5	St Johnstone	38	11	12	15	36	46	−10	45	Qualification for the Europa League third qualifying round (Note: St Johnstone qualified as the 2020–21 Scottish Cup winners.)

Rules for classification: 1) Points; 2) Goal difference; 3) Goals scored; 4) Head-to-head points; 5) Head-to-Head goal difference; 6) Play-off (only if deciding champion, UEFA competitions qualification, second stage group allocation or relegation).
(C) Champions

=== Division summary ===
Round	1	2	3	4	5	6	7	8	9	10	11	12	13	14	15	16	17	18	19	20	21	22	23	24	25	26	27	28	29	30	31	32	33	34	35	36	37	38
Ground	H	A	A	H	A	H	A	H	A	H	A	A	A	H	H	A	A	H	H	A	H	H	A	H	H	A	A	H	H	H	A	A	A	A	H	H	A	H
Result	W	W	W	D	W	L	W	D	L	W	D	W	L	D	D	W	W	D	W	L	L	L	D	W	L	W	W	W	W	L	L	W	D	L	W	L	W	D
Position	2	1	2	2	2	2	2	3	3	3	3	3	4	4	4	3	3	4	3	4	4	4	4	3	4	4	3	3	3	3	3	3	3	3	3	3	3	3

Updated to match(es) played on 15 May 2021. Source:
A = Away; H = Home; W = Win; D = Draw; L = Loss

=== League Cup table ===
Pos	Team	Pld	W	PW	PL	L	GF	GA	GD	Pts	Qualification	HIB	DUN	COV	BRO	FOR
1	Hibernian	4	4	0	0	0	10	3	+7	12	Qualification for the Second round	—	4–1	—	3–1	—
2	Dundee	4	3	0	0	1	9	4	+5	9	Qualification for the Second round	—	—	3–0	—	3–0
3	Cove Rangers	4	1	1	0	2	4	7	−3	5		1–2	—	—	—	1–0
4	Brora Rangers	4	0	0	2	2	6	10	−4	2		—	0–2	2–2p	—	—
5	Forfar Athletic	4	0	1	0	3	3	8	−5	2		0–1	—	—	p3–3	—

Rules for classification: 1) points, 2) goal difference, 3) goals scored, 4) away goals scored, 5) matches won, 6) away matches won, 7) drawing of lots.

=== Management statistics ===
Name	From	To	P	W	D	L	Win% (Note: Win% is the percentage of matches won rounded to two decimal places.)
(Scotland) Jack Ross	15 July 2020	22 May 2021	50	27	10	13	54.00

== Transfers ==
During the 2020–21 season, Hibs formed strategic partnerships with Charleston Battery, Stenhousemuir and Brighton & Hove Albion.

=== Players in ===
Player	From	Fee
(Scotland) Kevin Nisbet	(Scotland) Dunfermline Athletic	Undisclosed
(England) Drey Wright	(Scotland) St Johnstone	Free
(Cyprus) Alex Gogić	(Scotland) Hamilton Academical	Free
(Scotland) Stephen McGinn	(Scotland) St Mirren	Free
(Scotland) Kyle Magennis	(Scotland) St Mirren	Undisclosed
(England) Matt Macey	(England) Arsenal	Free
(Australia) Jackson Irvine	(England) Hull City	Free
(Scotland) Chris Cadden	(United States) Columbus Crew	Undisclosed

=== Players out ===
Player	To	Fee
(Hungary) Ádám Bogdán	(Hungary) Ferencvaros	Free
(Lithuania) Vykintas Slivka	(Greece) Apollon Smyrnis	Free
(Scotland) Steven Whittaker	(Scotland) Dunfermline Athletic	Free
(Switzerland) Florian Kamberi	(Switzerland) FC St. Gallen	£150,000
(England) Adam Jackson	(England) Lincoln City	Undisclosed
(Republic of Ireland) Daryl Horgan	(England) Wycombe Wanderers	Undisclosed
(Scotland) Ben Stirling	(Scotland) Hamilton Academical	Free

=== Loans in ===
Player	From
(Scotland) Jamie Murphy	(Scotland) Rangers
(Jamaica) Dillon Barnes	(England) Queens Park Rangers

=== Loans out ===
Player	To
(Scotland) Innes Murray	(Scotland) Alloa Athletic
(Poland) Kevin Dąbrowski	(Scotland) Dumbarton
(Scotland) Josh Campbell	(Scotland) Edinburgh City
(Scotland) Connor Young	(Scotland) Civil Service Strollers
(Scotland) Jack Brydon	(Scotland) Civil Service Strollers
(Wales) Tom James	(England) Wigan Athletic
(Scotland) Fraser Murray	(Scotland) Dunfermline Athletic
(Scotland) Callum Yeats	(Scotland) Stenhousemuir
(Scotland) Jayden Fairley	(Scotland) Stenhousemuir
(Philippines) Yrick Gallantes	(Philippines) Azkals Development Team
(Scotland) Paddy Martin	(Scotland) Stenhousemuir
(Scotland) Ryan Shanley	(Scotland) Kelty Hearts
(Wales) Tom James	(England) Salford City
(Scotland) Stevie Mallan	(Turkey) Yeni Malatyaspor
(Scotland) Jamie Gullan	(Scotland) Raith Rovers
(Scotland) Ryan Shanley	(Republic of Ireland) Finn Harps
(Scotland) Jack Brydon	(Scotland) Stenhousemuir
(Scotland) Stephen McGinn	(Scotland) Greenock Morton
(Scotland) Scott Allan	(Scotland) Inverness Caledonian Thistle

== See also ==
- List of Hibernian F.C. seasons
