= Renfrewshire derby =

Football derby in Scotland

Renfrewshire Derby
- Location: Greenock and Paisley, Renfrewshire
- Teams: Greenock Morton and St Mirren
- First meeting: 30 September 1882; Morton 5–1 St Mirren,
- Latest meeting: 8 July 2023; Greenock Morton 2–0 St Mirren

Statistics
- Total meetings: 179
- All-time series: St Mirren: 76; Drawn: 44; Greenock Morton: 60
- Largest victory: St Mirren 8–0 Morton (5 February 1938); Morton 6–1 St Mirren (19 September 1946)

Greenock Morton	St Mirren

The Renfrewshire derby is a football derby in Scotland, contested between the senior clubs Greenock Morton and St Mirren.

Since the sides first met in 1882, the fixture has grown in significance over the years, due in part to the demise of other Renfrewshire football clubs, and is one of the most hotly contested derbies in Scotland today. Although both sides have regularly competed at the same level of Scottish football, recent years have seen St Mirren competing in the Scottish Premiership, with Morton competing in the lower leagues. The Renfrewshire Cup, an annual regional cup competition turned pre-season friendly, was held until 2014 to ensure at least one Renfrewshire Derby a year.

In the 2014–15 season, St Mirren were relegated from the Scottish Premiership, and Morton were promoted from Scottish League One, meaning that the two sides met in league action for the first time in 15 years. On 6 August 2016, it was confirmed that Morton had gone 6,238 days without a competitive win against St Mirren. In November 2016 Morton recorded a 3–1 victory over St Mirren, their first in the league in 17 years.

The rivalry sees a large amount of animosity between the two sets of fans.

== History ==
=== Head-to-head ===
As of: 11 November 2020

Competition	GP	STM	Dr	MOR	STMG	MORG
League	159	64	40	55	242	227
Scottish Cup	6	5	0	1	15	12
League Cup	12	6	3	3	24	21
Challenge Cup	2	1	1	0	4	2
Totals	179	76	44	59	285	262

=== Recent meetings ===
After St Mirren were relegated from the Premiership at the end of 2014–15 and Morton were promoted from League One, the sides met for the first time in the league for 15 years. The meetings in the Championship since (plus one Scottish League Cup match, their most recent meeting as of 2025) are detailed below:

21 August 2015	Greenock Morton	0–0	St Mirren	Greenock
19:45		SPFL Report	Conlan (red card) 55'	Stadium: Cappielow; Attendance: 5,343; Referee: Greg Aitken

20 November 2015	St Mirren	1–1	Greenock Morton	Paisley
19:45	Baird 11'	SPFL Report	Samuel 90'	Stadium: St Mirren Park; Attendance: 4,163; Referee: John Beaton

2 January 2016	Greenock Morton	0–1	St Mirren	Greenock
15:00		SPFL Report	Shankland 42'	Stadium: Cappielow; Attendance: 4,736; Referee: Andrew Dallas

16 April 2016	St Mirren	3–1	Greenock Morton	Paisley
15:00	Shankland 7'; Gallagher 62'; Mallan 90+2'	BBC Report	Johnstone 59'	Stadium: St Mirren Park; Attendance: 4,299; Referee: Willie Collum

6 August 2016	St Mirren	1–1	Greenock Morton	Paisley
15:00	Sutton 83'	BBC Report	O'Ware 17'	Stadium: St Mirren Park; Attendance: 4,997; Referee: Steven McLean

1 November 2016	Greenock Morton	3–1	St Mirren	Greenock
15:00	O'Ware 15'; Forbes 27'; Oliver 68'	BBC Report	Gordon 86'	Stadium: Cappielow; Attendance: 3,378; Referee: Willie Collum

31 December 2016	St Mirren	1–1	Greenock Morton	Paisley
15:00	MacKenzie 30'	BBC Report	Lamie 90+3'	Stadium: St Mirren Park; Attendance: 4,902; Referee: Nick Walsh

11 April 2017	Greenock Morton	1–4	St Mirren	Greenock
19:45	Murdoch 29'	BBC Report	Demetriou 20'; Mallan 45'; Sutton 56'; MacKenzie 80'	Stadium: Cappielow; Attendance: 4,609; Referee: Stephen Finnie

12 August 2017	Greenock Morton	4–1	St Mirren	Greenock
15:00	Tidser 26' (pen.), 50' (pen.); McHugh 72'; Murdoch 77'	BBC Report	Smith 41'	Stadium: Cappielow; Attendance: 4,661; Referee: Willie Collum

28 October 2017	St Mirren	2–2	Greenock Morton	Paisley
15:00	McShane 66' (pen.); Reilly 72'	BBC Report	Murdoch 68'; Harkins 79' (pen.)	Stadium: St Mirren Park; Attendance: 5,496; Referee: Steven McLean

2 January 2018	Greenock Morton	1–1	St Mirren	Greenock
15:00	O'Ware 80'	BBC Report	Morgan 25'	Stadium: Cappielow; Attendance: 4,126; Referee: Kevin Clancy

21 April 2018	St Mirren	2–1	Greenock Morton	Paisley
15:00	Mullen 10'; Morgan 72'	BBC Report	Doyle 30'	Stadium: St Mirren Park; Attendance: 6,422; Referee: Bobby Madden

11 November 2020 2020–21 Scottish League Cup (Group stage)	St Mirren	1–1 (6–5 p)	Greenock Morton	Paisley
19:45	Obika 39'		MacIver 60'	Stadium: St Mirren Park; Attendance: Unknown; Referee: Bobby Madden

=== Early history (1874–1901) ===
Two of the oldest professional football clubs in Scotland, Morton were formed 1874 in Greenock, while the St Mirren cricket club was founded a year later. Its members branched off into rugby and then football in 1877. Despite their proximity to each other they wouldn't meet for another five years. After St Mirren defeated Yoker 8–0 and Morton overcame Johnstown Rovers 2–1 in the first round of the 1882–83 Scottish Cup they were drawn to face each other in the second round. The match was played at Cappielow on 30 September 1882 and the home side ran out comfortable victors, winning 5–1.

St Mirren were founder members of the Scottish Football League in 1890 but, as Morton didn't join the league until 1893 with the formation of the old Second Division, the first league meeting wasn't until 1900. Played at Cappielow on 1 September 1900, there was similar result as Morton overcame their rivals 1–0.

In the intervening years, the sides met eight times in the Renfrewshire Cup. The first of these came in 1884, two years after Morton's 5–1 Scottish Cup win. On 20 December 1884, a crowd of 4,500 people watched an entertaining third round match end 3–4 at Westmarch in Paisley. St Mirren would not get their first victory against their rivals until their next meeting on 10 December 1887. A crowd of 4,000 people witnessed St Mirren's 2–0 victory in the third round match at Westmarch. As the century drew to a close, the teams met for the first time in a Renfrewshire Cup Final. St Mirren were looking to win their third Renfrewshire Cup in-a-row and seventh overall, while Morton were aiming for a second title when the original match on 29 April 1899 was played at the neutral Underwood Park in Paisley. A 1–1 draw meant the need for a replay a week later at the same venue which Morton won 2–0.

==== Results ====
Date	Competition	Home team	Score	Away team	Stadium
30 September 1882	Scottish Cup second round	Morton	5–1	St Mirren	Cappielow
20 December 1884	Renfrewshire Cup third round	St Mirren	3–4	Morton	Westmarch
10 December 1887	Renfrewshire Cup third round	St Mirren	2–0	Morton	Westmarch
9 February 1889	Renfrewshire Cup semi-final	St Mirren	3–3	Morton	Westmarch
16 February 1889	Renfrewshire Cup semi-final replay	Morton	1–3	St Mirren	Cappielow
25 February 1893	Renfrewshire Cup; Final	Morton	3–0	St Mirren	Underwood Park
18 November 1893	Renfrewshire Cup third round	St Mirren	5–1	Morton	Westmarch
2 March 1895	Renfrewshire League	Morton	2–0	St Mirren	Cappielow
3 August 1895	Renfrewshire League	St Mirren	2–2	Morton	Westmarch
7 January 1899	Western League	St Mirren	1–1	Morton	Westmarch
29 April 1899	Renfrewshire Cup; Final	St Mirren	1–1	Morton	Underwood Park
6 May 1899	Renfrewshire Cup; Final replay	St Mirren	0–2	Morton	Underwood Park
8 May 1899	Western League	Morton	1–1	St. Mirren	Cappielow
3 February 1900	Glasgow & West of Scotland; League	Morton	1–0	St Mirren	Cappielow
1 May 1900	Glasgow & West of Scotland; League	St Mirren	2–1	Morton	Love Street
1 September 1900	First Division (old)	Morton	1–0	St Mirren	Cappielow
22 September 1900	First Division (old)	St Mirren	0–2	Morton	Love Street
29 September 1900	Glasgow & West of Scotland; League	Morton	6–1	St Mirren	Cappielow
31 December 1900	Glasgow & West of Scotland; League	St Mirren	6–1	Morton	Love Street
27 April 1901	Renfrewshire Cup; Final 1st leg	Morton	3–2	St Mirren	Cappielow
4 May 1901	Renfrewshire Cup; Final 2nd leg	St Mirren	0–1 (2-4 agg)	Morton	Love Street
28 September 1901	First Division (old)	Morton	1–3	St Mirren	Cappielow
19 October 1901	First Division (old)	St Mirren	1–1	Morton	Love Street
22 February 1902	Glasgow & West of Scotland; League	Morton	2–3	St Mirren	Cappielow
1 March 1902	Glasgow & West of Scotland; League	St Mirren	3–1	Morton	Love Street
26 April 1902	Renfrewshire Cup; Final 1st leg	Morton	0–1	St Mirren	Cappielow
3 May 1902	Renfrewshire Cup; Final 2nd leg	St Mirren	0–4 (1-4 agg)	Morton	Love Street

Source: Scottish Football Historical Archive

=== 21st century ===
St Mirren started the new millennium in the perfect fashion by sealing promotion back to the top flight of Scottish football for the first time in almost a decade. This meant that four annual meetings between the sides that fans had grown used to came to an end; the sides wouldn't meet again until a League Cup match in 2002 after both sides suffered relegation in the 2000–01 season. This favoured the Paisley side as St Mirren remained in a higher league than Morton until both sides found their way into the Championship for season 2015–16. This led to a period of St Mirren dominance, with Morton's last competitive win coming on 10 April 1999. The 17-year sequence finally ended on 1 November 2016 with a 3-1 Morton victory at Cappielow.

==== Results ====
From season 1999–2000 to 2011.

Date	Competition	Home team	Score	Away team	Stadium
18 September 1999	First Division	St Mirren	3–2	Greenock Morton	Love Street
6 November 1999	First Division	Greenock Morton	1–4	St Mirren	Cappielow
3 January 2000	First Division	St Mirren	1–1	Greenock Morton	Love Street
18 March 2000	First Division	Greenock Morton	0–2	St Mirren	Cappielow
7 September 2002	League Cup first round	Greenock Morton	2–3 (a.e.t.)	St Mirren	Cappielow
27 September 2005	Challenge Cup semi-final	St Mirren	0–0 (4–2p)	Greenock Morton	Love Street
23 August 2011	League Cup second round	Greenock Morton	3–4	St Mirren	Cappielow

Source:Statto.com

== Notes ==
1. Morton were renamed Greenock Morton in 1994
2. League, Scottish Cup, League Cup and Challenge Cup meetings only. Does not include meetings in the Renfrewshire Cup, Scottish Spring Cup and meetings under war time regulations.
