= Kevin Nisbet =

Scottish footballer (born 1997)

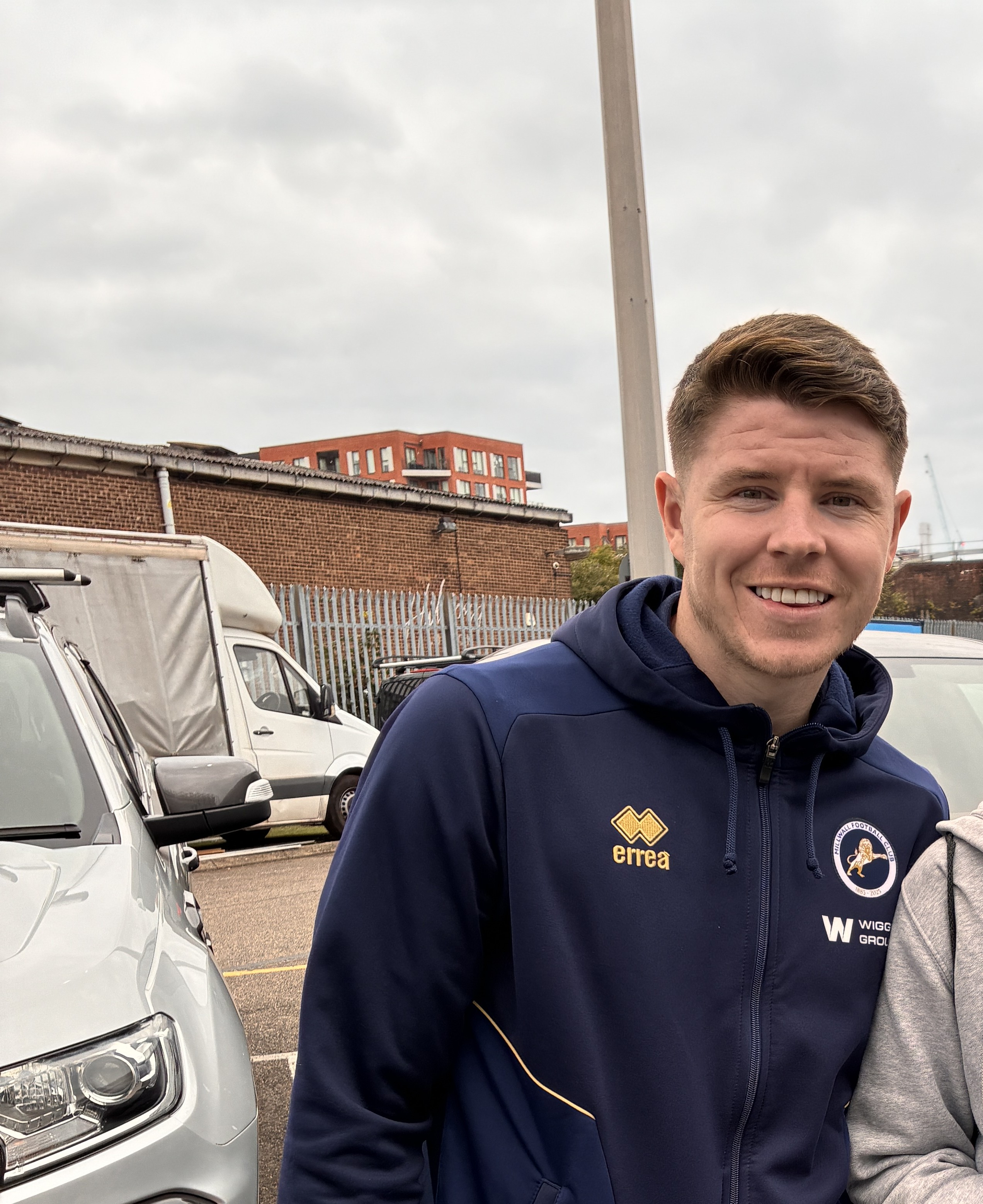
- Kevin Nisbet in 2025.

Personal information
- Full name: Kevin Michael Nisbet
- Date of birth: 8 March 1997 (age 29)
- Place of birth: Glasgow, Scotland
- Height: 1.80 m (5 ft 11 in)
- Position: Centre-forward

Team information
- Current team: Aberdeen
- Number: 15

Youth career
- 2011–2012: Hibernian
- 2012–2014: Partick Thistle

Senior career*
Years	Team	Apps	(Gls)
2014–2018	Partick Thistle	17	(0)
2015	→ East Stirlingshire (loan)	11	(6)
2016–2017	→ Ayr United (loan)	20	(2)
2018	→ Dumbarton (loan)	9	(0)
2018–2019	Raith Rovers	34	(29)
2019–2020	Dunfermline Athletic	25	(18)
2020–2023	Hibernian	78	(31)
2023–2025	Millwall	30	(5)
2024–2025	→ Aberdeen (loan)	32	(11)
2025–	Aberdeen	32	(9)

International career^{‡}
2021–	Scotland	11	(1)
- * Club domestic league appearances and goals as of 17 May 2025 ‡ National team caps and goals as of 21 June 2023

Kevin Michael Nisbet (born 8 March 1997) is a Scottish professional footballer who plays as a centre-forward for Scottish Premiership club Aberdeen and the Scotland national team. He has previously played for Partick Thistle, Raith Rovers, Dunfermline Athletic, Hibernian and Millwall as well as East Stirlingshire, Ayr United, Aberdeen and Dumbarton on loan.

== Club career ==
=== Partick Thistle and loans ===
Nisbet was raised in Cambuslang, South Lanarkshire, and attended Trinity High School. He played for Hibernian's under-15 team before joining the Partick Thistle youth system. He joined the club as a full-time apprentice in summer 2014.

Having quickly progressed through the Thistle Weir Academy, he made his breakthrough in the Firhill side's development squad. He made 18 appearances at that level during the 2014–15 campaign, and scored six goals, including a hat-trick against Falkirk.

Nisbet joined Scottish League Two side East Stirlingshire on loan in February 2015, making 11 appearances and scoring six goals in his time at Ochilview Park. He returned to Partick Thistle and made his first-team debut for the club on 19 September 2015 as a substitute in a 1–0 defeat away to Ross County in the Scottish Premiership.

Nisbet joined Ayr United on loan at the start of the 2016–17 season, on a six-month deal running until 14 January 2017. He later joined Dumbarton on loan in January 2018.

Thistle were relegated to the Scottish Championship via the play-offs at the end of the 2017–18 season, following which Nisbet was one of many players released by the club.

=== Raith and Dunfermline ===
Nisbet signed for Scottish League One side Raith Rovers in July 2018. He finished the season at Raith Rovers with 35 goals in all competitions.

Nisbet then signed for local rivals Dunfermline Athletic in June 2019, scoring 20 goals in all competitions before the end of 2019. During the January 2020 transfer window, a number of clubs - including his future employers Hibernian - were said to be interested in the player's signature, however, Dunfermline opted to reject all bids for Nisbet with the intention of keeping him until at least the summer. Nisbet finished the curtailed 2019–20 season having scored 23 goals in 32 appearances.

=== Hibernian ===
After attracting interest from several clubs, Nisbet signed a four-year contract with Scottish Premiership side Hibernian on 10 July 2020 for an undisclosed fee. During the January 2021 transfer window Hibs rejected offers for Nisbet from EFL Championship club Birmingham City. Nisbet finished the 2020–21 season as Hibs' top scorer scoring 18 goals in 45 games in all domestic competitions.

On 22 July 2021, Nisbet scored his first goal in a European club tournament in Hibs' 3–0 win over Andorran side FC Santa Coloma. He suffered a knee injury in February 2022 that required surgery, which prevented him from playing for several months.

Nisbet returned to first-team training in November 2022, and scored in his first league appearance back, a 3–2 defeat at Rangers on 15 December. He scored a hat-trick in a 3–2 win at Motherwell on 8 January, which helped him win a Premiership player of the month award. Hibs accepted an offer of around £2 million from EFL Championship club Millwall during the January 2023 transfer window, but Nisbet decided against the proposed move. He finished the season with 12 goals from 20 appearances for Hibs. On 31 May 2023, Hibs were reported as having accepted an offer of £2 million for Nisbet from Millwall.

=== Millwall ===
Nisbet signed a three-year contract with Millwall on 10 June 2023. He made his debut for the club on 5 August 2023 in a 1–0 victory over Middlesbrough. Nisbet scored his first Millwall goal on 26 August 2023 in a 1–0 win against Stoke City. In May 2024, Nisbet was dropped from the Millwall squad for a match against Swansea City due to a "disciplinary issue".

=== Aberdeen (loan) ===
On 24 August 2024, Nisbet went on loan to Aberdeen. On 24 May 2025, he won the Scottish Cup title.

=== Return to Aberdeen ===
On 1 September 2025, Nisbet signed a 3 year deal with Aberdeen for a fee of £300,000

== International career ==
On 16 March 2021, Nisbet received his first Scotland call-up ahead of 2022 World Cup qualifiers against Austria, Israel and Faroe Islands. Nisbet made his international debut on 31 March, appearing as a substitute in a 4–0 win against the Faroe Islands. He was one of three strikers selected in the Scotland squad for the delayed UEFA Euro 2020 tournament, and scored his first international goal in a pre-tournament friendly against the Netherlands. Nisbet appeared as a substitute in each of Scotland's three matches at the Euro 2020 finals.

After two years out of the squad, partly due to a long-term knee injury, Nisbet was recalled for the UEFA Euro 2024 qualifying matches in June 2023.

== Career statistics ==
=== Club ===
As of match played 1 May 2026

Appearances and goals by club, season and competition
Club	Season	League			National cup (Note: Includes Scottish Cup, FA Cup)		League cup (Note: Includes Scottish League Cup, EFL Cup)		Europe		Other		Total	
Club	Season	Division	Apps	Goals	Apps	Goals	Apps	Goals	Apps	Goals	Apps	Goals	Apps	Goals
Partick Thistle	2014–15	Scottish Premiership	0	0	0	0	0	0	—		—		0	0
Partick Thistle	2015–16	Scottish Premiership	8	0	1	0	0	0	—		—		9	0
Partick Thistle	2016–17	Scottish Premiership	3	0	1	0	1	0	—		—		5	0
Partick Thistle	2017–18	Scottish Premiership	6	0	0	0	6 (Note: Five Scottish League Cup appearances are shown here Kevin Nisbet at Soccerbase and one is shown here Kevin Nisbet at Soccerbase)	0	—		—		12	0
Partick Thistle	Total		17	0	2	0	7	0	—		—		26	0
Partick Thistle U-20s	2016–17	SPFL Development League	–		–		–		—		2 (Note: Appearances in Scottish Challenge Cup)	3	2	3
Partick Thistle U-20s	2017–18	SPFL Development League	–		–		–		—		2	1	2	1
Partick Thistle U-20s	Total		–		–		–		—		4	4	4	4
East Stirlingshire (loan)	2014–15	Scottish League Two	11	6	0	0	0	0	—		—		11	6
Ayr United (loan)	2016–17	Scottish Championship	20	2	0	0	0	0	—		—		20	2
Dumbarton (loan)	2017–18	Scottish Championship	9	0	1	0	0	0	—		3	0	13	0
Raith Rovers	2018–19	Scottish League One	34	29	2	1	4	1	—		6 (Note: Two appearances and one goal in Scottish Challenge Cup, four appearances and two goals in Scottish Championship play-offs)	3	46	34
Dunfermline Athletic	2019–20	Scottish Championship	25	18	1	0	5	5	—		1	0	32	23
Hibernian	2020–21	Scottish Premiership	33	14	6 (Note: Includes one appearance in 2019–20 Scottish Cup that was rescheduled to October 2020 due to COVID-19)	2	6	2	—		—		45	18
Hibernian	2021–22	Scottish Premiership	26	5	2	2	4	1	4 (Note: Appearances in UEFA Conference League)	1	—		36	9
Hibernian	2022–23	Scottish Premiership	19	12	1	0	0	0	—		—		20	12
Hibernian	Total		78	31	9	4	10	3	4	1	—		101	39
Millwall	2023–24	Championship	27	5	1	0	1	0	–		—		29	5
Millwall	2024–25	Championship	1	0	0	0	0	0	–		—		1	0
Millwall	2025–26	Championship	2	0	0	0	2	0	–		—		4	0
Millwall	Total		30	5	1	0	1	0	–		—		32	5
Aberdeen (loan)	2024–25	Scottish Premiership	32	11	4	2	1	1	–		—		37	14
Aberdeen	2025–26	Scottish Premiership	32	9	3	1	1	0	5	1	—		41	11
Aberdeen	Total		64	20	7	3	2	1	5	1	—		78	25
Career total			288	111	25	8	29	10	9	2	14	7	365	138

=== International ===
As of 20 June 2023

Appearances and goals by national team and year
National team	Year	Apps	Goals
Scotland	2021	10	1
Scotland	2023	1	0
Total		11	1

As of match played 7 September 2021. Scotland score listed first, score column indicates score after each Nisbet goal.

List of international goals scored by Kevin Nisbet
No.	Date	Venue	Cap	Opponent	Score	Result	Competition	Ref.
1	2 June 2021	Estadio Algarve, Faro/Loulé, Portugal	2	Netherlands	2–1	2–2	Friendly	

== Honours ==
Aberdeen

- Scottish Cup: 2024–25
