= Scott Shepherd (footballer) =

Scottish footballer (born 1996)

Personal information
- Date of birth: 29 May 1996 (age 30)
- Place of birth: Perth, Scotland
- Position: Forward

Team information
- Current team: Forfar Athletic
- Number: 9

Youth career
- Falkirk

Senior career*
| Years | Team | Apps | (Gls) |
| 2013–2018 | Falkirk | 43 | (1) |
| 2015 | → Stirling Albion (loan) | 8 | (0) |
| 2016 | → Brechin City (loan) | 8 | (1) |
| 2017–2018 | → Edinburgh City (loan) | 20 | (8) |
| 2018–2020 | Edinburgh City | 60 | (12) |
| 2020–2022 | Forfar Athletic | 57 | (7) |
| 2022–2025 | East Fife | 102 | (12) |
| 2025– | Forfar Athletic | 35 | (7) |
- * Club domestic league appearances and goals as of 4 May 2026

Scott Shepherd (born 29 May 1996) is a Scottish footballer who plays as a forward for Scottish League Two club Forfar Athletic in his second spell with the club. Shepherd has previously played for Falkirk, Stirling Albion, Brechin City, Edinburgh City and East Fife.

== Career ==
Born in Perth, Shepherd began his career with Falkirk. He was first included in a matchday squad on 20 August 2013, in a Scottish Challenge Cup second round match at Ayr United, coming on in the 96th minute for Thomas Grant and heading the winner in a 2–1 win. He made his professional debut four days later in a 0–3 Scottish Championship win at Livingston, replacing hat-trick scorer Philip Roberts for the final 22 minutes. On 23 November, he came on as an 85th-minute substitute for Rory Loy, and two minutes later scored his first league goal to conclude a 4–0 home win over Cowdenbeath.

On 2 August 2014, Shepherd scored four minutes after replacing Botti Biabi to conclude a 3–1 comeback win at Montrose in the first round of the Scottish Challenge Cup. From 8 January to 28 March 2015, Shepherd was loaned to Stirling Albion, where he made eight Scottish League One appearances. In January 2016, he joined Scottish League One side Brechin City on loan until the end of the season. After scoring once in eight appearances for the Glebe Park side, Shepherd returned to Falkirk at the end of March.

Shepherd was loaned to Edinburgh City in November 2017, with the move subsequently being extended until the end of the 2017–18 season. Shepherd moved to Edinburgh City on a permanent basis in August 2018.

On 4 July 2020, Shepherd signed for Forfar Athletic where he scored seven goals in two seasons at Station Park.

Shepherd joined fellow Scottish League Two side East Fife on a one-year contract from 24 May 2022. Shepherd departed the Fifers in 2025 after helping them earn promotion to Scottish League One through the promotion play-offs.

On 3 June 2025, Shepherd returned to Forfar Athletic on a two-year deal.

== Career statistics ==
As of match played 7 February 2026

Appearances and goals by club, season and competition
| Club | Season | League | | | Scottish Cup | | League Cup | | Other | | Total | |
| Club | Season | Division | Apps | Goals | Apps | Goals | Apps | Goals | Apps | Goals | Apps | Goals |
|---|---|---|---|---|---|---|---|---|---|---|---|---|
| Falkirk | 2013–14 | Scottish Championship | 14 | 1 | 1 | 0 | 0 | 0 | 4 (Note: Appearance(s) in Scottish Premiership play-offs) | 0 | 19 | 1 |
| Falkirk | 2014–15 | Scottish Championship | 12 | 0 | 1 | 0 | 2 | 1 | 2 (Note: Appearance(s) in Scottish Challenge Cup) | 0 | 17 | 1 |
| Falkirk | 2015–16 | Scottish Championship | 4 | 0 | 0 | 0 | 1 | 0 | 1 | 0 | 6 | 0 |
| Falkirk | 2016–17 | Scottish Championship | 11 | 0 | 0 | 0 | 0 | 0 | 2 | 0 | 13 | 0 |
| Falkirk | 2017–18 | Scottish Championship | 2 | 0 | 0 | 0 | 4 | 0 | 1 | 0 | 7 | 0 |
| Falkirk | Total | | 43 | 1 | 2 | 0 | 7 | 1 | 10 | 0 | 62 | 2 |
| Stirling Albion (loan) | 2014–15 | Scottish League One | 8 | 0 | — | | — | | — | | 8 | 0 |
| Brechin City (loan) | 2015–16 | Scottish League One | 8 | 1 | — | | — | | — | | 8 | 1 |
| Edinburgh City (loan) | 2017–18 | Scottish League Two | 20 | 8 | — | | — | | — | | 20 | 8 |
| Edinburgh City | 2018–19 | Scottish League Two | 34 | 5 | 3 | 0 | 0 | 0 | 7 (Note: Five appearances and three goals in Scottish Challenge Cup; Two appearances in Scottish League One play-offs) | 3 | 44 | 8 |
| Edinburgh City | 2019–20 | Scottish League Two | 26 | 7 | 3 | 0 | 4 | 0 | 1 | 0 | 34 | 7 |
| Edinburgh City | Total | | 60 | 12 | 6 | 0 | 4 | 0 | 8 | 3 | 78 | 15 |
| Forfar Athletic | 2020–21 | Scottish League One | 21 | 1 | 3 | 0 | 3 | 0 | — | | 27 | 1 |
| Forfar Athletic | 2021–22 | Scottish League Two | 36 | 6 | 2 | 1 | 3 | 0 | 3 (Note: One appearance in Scottish Challenge Cup; One appearance in Scottish League One play-offs) | 0 | 44 | 7 |
| Forfar Athletic | Total | | 57 | 7 | 5 | 1 | 6 | 0 | 3 | 0 | 71 | 8 |
| East Fife | 2022–23 | Scottish League Two | 34 | 6 | 1 | 0 | 4 | 2 | 3 (Note: Two appearances in Scottish League Challenge Cup; One appearance and one goal in Scottish League One play-offs) | 1 | 42 | 9 |
| East Fife | 2023–24 | Scottish League Two | 35 | 4 | 1 | 0 | 4 | 0 | 3 | 0 | 43 | 4 |
| East Fife | 2024–25 | Scottish League Two | 33 | 2 | 1 | 0 | 4 | 1 | 6 (Note: Two appearances and one goal in Scottish Challenge Cup; Four appearances in Scottish League One play-offs) | 1 | 44 | 4 |
| East Fife | Total | | 102 | 12 | 3 | 0 | 12 | 3 | 12 | 2 | 129 | 17 |
| Forfar Athletic | 2025–26 | Scottish League Two | 22 | 6 | 2 | 0 | 4 | 1 | 8 | 0 | 36 | 7 |
| Career total | | | 320 | 47 | 18 | 1 | 33 | 5 | 41 | 5 | 412 | 58 |
