= Cameron Breadner =

Scottish footballer

Personal information
- Date of birth: 13 October 2000 (age 26)
- Place of birth: Paisley, Scotland
- Height: 1.81 m (5 ft 11 in)
- Position: Midfielder

Team information
- Current team: Caledonian Braves
- Number: 11

Senior career*
Years	Team	Apps	(Gls)
2018–2021	St Mirren	4	(0)
2019	→ Stenhousemuir (loan)	1	(0)
2020	→ Albion Rovers (loan)	3	(0)
2020–2021	→ Forfar Athletic (loan)	4	(0)
2021–	Caledonian Braves	67	(16)
- * Club domestic league appearances and goals as of 14 December 2024

Cameron Breadner (born 13 October 2000) is a Scottish professional footballer who plays for Lowland League West side Caledonian Braves, as a midfielder.

Breadner started his senior career at St Mirren, with loan spells at Stenhousemuir in February 2019, Albion Rovers, and Forfar Athletic in September 2020.
