= 2020–21 Scottish League Cup =

Tournament details
- Country: Scotland
- Dates: 6 October 2020 – 28 February 2021
- Teams: 44

Final positions
- Champions: St Johnstone
- Runners-up: Livingston

Tournament statistics
- Matches played: 95
- Goals scored: 285 (3 per match)
- Top goal scorer(s): Alan Forrest (7 goals)

The 2020–21 Scottish League Cup (also known as the Betfred Cup for sponsorship reasons) was the 75th season of Scotland's second-most prestigious football knockout competition.

The format for the 2020–21 competition was the same as the previous four seasons.

It began with eight groups of five teams including all 2019–20 Scottish Professional Football League (SPFL) clubs, excluding those competing in Champions League and Europa League qualifiers, as well as the winners of the 2019–20 Highland Football League (Brora Rangers) and the 2019–20 Lowland Football League (Kelty Hearts).

The domestic broadcasting rights for the competition were held exclusively by Premier Sports.

St Johnstone were the winners of the Scottish League Cup, beating Livingston 1–0 in the final. It was the second major trophy in their history, after the 2014 Scottish Cup. They became the first team in nearly five years to win a Scottish domestic trophy other than Celtic.

== Schedule ==
Round	First match date	Fixtures	Clubs
Group stage	6 October 2020	80	44 → 16
Second round	28 November 2020	8	16 → 8
Quarter finals	15 December 2020	4	8 → 4
Semi finals	23 January 2021	2	4 → 2
Final	28 February 2021	1	2 → 1

== Format ==
The competition began with eight groups of five teams. The four clubs competing in the UEFA Champions League (Celtic) and Europa League (Rangers, Motherwell, and Aberdeen) qualifying rounds were given a bye through to the second round. The 40 teams competing in the group stage consisted of the other eight teams that competed in the 2019–20 Scottish Premiership, and all of the teams that competed in the 2019–20 Scottish Championship, 2019–20 Scottish League One and 2019–20 Scottish League Two. The 2019–20 Highland Football League and the 2019–20 Lowland Football League champions also competed.

The winners of each of the eight groups, as well as the four best runners-up progressed to the second round (last 16), which included the four UEFA qualifying clubs. At this stage, the competition reverts to the traditional knock-out format. The four group winners with the highest points total and the clubs entering at this stage were seeded, with the four group winners with the lowest points unseeded along with the four best runners-up.

=== Bonus point system ===
In December 2015, the SPFL announced that alongside the new group stage format, a bonus point system would be introduced to provide greater excitement and increase the number of meaningful games at this stage. The traditional point system of awarding three points for a win and one point for a draw is used, however, for each group stage match that finishes in a draw, a penalty shoot-out takes place, with the winner being awarded a bonus point.

== Group stage ==
The group stage was made up of eight teams from the 2019–20 Scottish Premiership, and all ten teams from each of the 2019–20 Scottish Championship, 2019–20 Scottish League One and 2019–20 Scottish League Two, as well as the winners of the 2019–20 Highland Football League and 2019–20 Lowland Football League. The 40 teams were divided into two sections – North and South – with each section containing four top seeds, four second seeds and 12 unseeded teams. Each section was drawn into four groups with each group comprising one top seed, one second seed and three unseeded teams.

The draw for the group stage took place on 10 August 2020 and was broadcast live FreeSports & the SPFL YouTube channel.

=== North ===
==== Group A ====
Pos	Team	Pld	W	PW	PL	L	GF	GA	GD	Pts	Qualification	HOM	RAI	ICT	EFI	COW
1	Heart of Midlothian	4	4	0	0	0	8	3	+5	12	Qualification for the Second round	—	3–1	1–0	—	—
2	Raith Rovers	4	2	1	0	1	7	7	0	8		—	—	p3–3	2–1	—
3	Inverness Caledonian Thistle	4	1	1	1	1	4	4	0	6		—	—	—	1–0	p0–0
4	East Fife	4	1	0	0	3	5	6	−1	3		2–3	—	—	—	2–0
5	Cowdenbeath	4	0	0	1	3	0	4	−4	1		0–1	0–1	—	—	—

Rules for classification: 1) points, 2) goal difference, 3) goals scored, 4) away goals scored, 5) matches won, 6) away matches won, 7) drawing of lots.

==== Group B ====
Pos	Team	Pld	W	PW	PL	L	GF	GA	GD	Pts	Qualification	HIB	DUN	COV	BRO	FOR
1	Hibernian	4	4	0	0	0	10	3	+7	12	Qualification for the Second round	—	4–1	—	3–1	—
2	Dundee	4	3	0	0	1	9	4	+5	9	Qualification for the Second round	—	—	3–0	—	3–0
3	Cove Rangers	4	1	1	0	2	4	7	−3	5		1–2	—	—	—	1–0
4	Brora Rangers	4	0	0	2	2	6	10	−4	2		—	0–2	2–2p	—	—
5	Forfar Athletic	4	0	1	0	3	3	8	−5	2		0–1	—	—	p3–3	—

Rules for classification: 1) points, 2) goal difference, 3) goals scored, 4) away goals scored, 5) matches won, 6) away matches won, 7) drawing of lots.

==== Group C ====
Pos	Team	Pld	W	PW	PL	L	GF	GA	GD	Pts	Qualification	STJ	DUN	PET	KEL	BRE
1	St Johnstone	4	3	0	1	0	12	2	+10	10	Qualification for the Second round	—	0–0p	—	—	7–0
2	Dundee United	4	2	1	0	1	7	3	+4	8		—	—	0–1	1–0	—
3	Peterhead	4	2	1	0	1	6	5	+1	8		1–3	—	—	—	3–1
4	Kelty Hearts	4	1	0	1	2	4	4	0	4		1–2	—	1–1p	—	—
5	Brechin City	4	0	0	0	4	3	18	−15	0		—	2–6	—	0–2	—

Rules for classification: 1) points, 2) goal difference, 3) goals scored, 4) away goals scored, 5) matches won, 6) away matches won, 7) drawing of lots.

==== Group D ====
Pos	Team	Pld	W	PW	PL	L	GF	GA	GD	Pts	Qualification	ROS	ARB	ELG	STI	MON
1	Ross County	4	3	1	0	0	12	5	+7	11	Qualification for the Second round	—	2–1	—	3–0	—
2	Arbroath	4	3	0	0	1	9	4	+5	9	Qualification for the Second round	—	—	3–0	—	3–1
3	Elgin City	4	2	0	0	2	5	7	−2	6		1–4	—	—	2–0	—
4	Stirling Albion	4	1	0	0	3	3	8	−5	3		—	1–2	—	—	2–1
5	Montrose	4	0	0	1	3	5	10	−5	1		3–3p	—	0–2	—	—

Rules for classification: 1) points, 2) goal difference, 3) goals scored, 4) away goals scored, 5) matches won, 6) away matches won, 7) drawing of lots.

=== South ===
==== Group E ====
Pos	Team	Pld	W	PW	PL	L	GF	GA	GD	Pts	Qualification	DNF	FAL	KIL	CLY	DUM
1	Dunfermline Athletic	4	4	0	0	0	9	2	+7	12	Qualification for the Second round	—	2–0	—	3–2	—
2	Falkirk	4	3	0	0	1	9	3	+6	9	Qualification for the Second round	—	—	3–0	2–1	—
3	Kilmarnock	4	2	0	0	2	4	6	−2	6		0–3	—	—	—	2–0
4	Clyde	4	1	0	0	3	6	9	−3	3		—	—	0–2	—	3–2
5	Dumbarton	4	0	0	0	4	2	10	−8	0		0–1	0–4	—	—	—

Rules for classification: 1) points, 2) goal difference, 3) goals scored, 4) away goals scored, 5) matches won, 6) away matches won, 7) drawing of lots.

==== Group F ====
Pos	Team	Pld	W	PW	PL	L	GF	GA	GD	Pts	Qualification	AYR	ANN	STR	HAM	ALB
1	Ayr United	4	2	1	0	1	8	5	+3	8	Qualification for the Second round	—	1–0	p1–1	—	—
2	Annan Athletic	4	2	0	1	1	9	4	+5	7		—	—	1–1p	3–1	—
3	Stranraer	4	1	1	2	0	6	5	+1	7		—	—	—	2–1	2–2p
4	Hamilton Academical	4	2	0	0	2	7	6	+1	6		2–1	—	—	—	3–0
5	Albion Rovers	4	0	1	0	3	5	15	−10	2		2–5	1–5	—	—	—

Rules for classification: 1) points, 2) goal difference, 3) goals scored, 4) away goals scored, 5) matches won, 6) away matches won, 7) drawing of lots.

==== Group G ====
Pos	Team	Pld	W	PW	PL	L	GF	GA	GD	Pts	Qualification	STM	QOS	PAR	GMO	QPK
1	St Mirren	4	2	2	0	0	8	4	+4	10	Qualification for the Second round	—	—	4–1	p1–1	—
2	Queen of the South	4	1	1	2	0	7	5	+2	7		2–2p	—	0–0p	—	—
3	Partick Thistle	4	1	2	0	1	3	4	−1	7		—	—	—	p0–0	2–0
4	Greenock Morton	4	1	0	3	0	4	3	+1	6		—	2–2p	—	—	1–0
5	Queen's Park	4	0	0	0	4	1	7	−6	0		0–1	1–3	—	—	—

Rules for classification: 1) points, 2) goal difference, 3) goals scored, 4) away goals scored, 5) matches won, 6) away matches won, 7) drawing of lots.

==== Group H ====
Pos	Team	Pld	W	PW	PL	L	GF	GA	GD	Pts	Qualification	LIV	ALO	EDI	AIR	STE
1	Livingston	4	4	0	0	0	15	3	+12	12	Qualification for the Second round	—	2–1	—	4–1	—
2	Alloa Athletic	4	3	0	0	1	9	5	+4	9	Qualification for the Second round	—	—	2–1	—	4–2
3	Edinburgh City	4	1	0	1	2	5	9	−4	4		1–5	—	—	—	2–2p
4	Airdrieonians	4	1	0	0	3	3	7	−4	3		—	0–2	0–1	—	—
5	Stenhousemuir	4	0	1	0	3	4	12	−8	2		0–4	—	—	0–2	—

Rules for classification: 1) points, 2) goal difference, 3) goals scored, 4) away goals scored, 5) matches won, 6) away matches won, 7) drawing of lots.

=== Best runners-up ===
Pos	Grp	Team	Pld	W	PW	PL	L	GF	GA	GD	Pts	Qualification
1	E	Falkirk	4	3	0	0	1	9	3	+6	9	Qualification for the Second round
2	D	Arbroath	4	3	0	0	1	9	4	+5	9	Qualification for the Second round
3	B	Dundee	4	3	0	0	1	9	4	+5	9	Qualification for the Second round
4	H	Alloa Athletic	4	3	0	0	1	9	5	+4	9	Qualification for the Second round
5	C	Dundee United	4	2	1	0	1	7	3	+4	8	
6	A	Raith Rovers	4	2	1	0	1	7	7	0	8	
7	F	Annan Athletic	4	2	0	1	1	9	4	+5	7	
8	G	Queen of the South	4	1	1	2	0	7	5	+2	7	

Rules for classification: 1) points, 2) goal difference, 3) goals scored, 4) away goals scored, 5) matches won, 6) away matches won, 7) drawing of lots.

== Knockout phase ==
=== Second round ===
==== Draw and seeding ====
Aberdeen, Celtic, Motherwell and Rangers entered the competition at this stage, after receiving a bye for the group stage due to their participation in UEFA club competitions.

The four UEFA-qualifying clubs and the four group winners with the best record were seeded for the draw.

The draw for the second round took place on 15 November 2020 following the Hibernian v Dundee match live on Premier Sports 1.

Teams in Bold advanced to the quarter-finals.

Seeded	Unseeded
Aberdeen; Celtic; **Dunfermline Athletic**†; Heart of Midlothian†; **Hibernian**; **Livingston**; Motherwell; **Rangers**	**Alloa Athletic**†; Arbroath†; Ayr United†; Dundee†; Falkirk*; **Ross County**; **St Johnstone**; **St Mirren**

Notes

- † denotes teams playing in the Championship.
- * denotes team playing in League One.

==== Matches ====
28 November 2020	**Livingston**	**4–0**	Ayr United	Livingston
15:00	Chalmers 4' (o.g.); Fitzwater 6', 12'; Forrest 44'			Stadium: Almondvale Stadium; Referee: David Munro

28 November 2020	**Hibernian**	**1–0**	Dundee	Edinburgh
15:00	Murphy 44'			Stadium: Easter Road; Referee: Willie Collum

28 November 2020	Arbroath	**1–3**	**Dunfermline Athletic**	Arbroath
15:00	Hilson 65'		Dow 28'; E. Murray 36'; O'Hara 82' (pen.)	Stadium: Gayfield Park; Referee: Nick Walsh

28 November 2020	Motherwell	**1–2**	**St Johnstone**	Motherwell
15:00	Watt 61'		Hendry 68'; Wotherspoon 77'	Stadium: Fir Park; Referee: Alan Muir

28 November 2020	**Alloa Athletic**	**1–0** (a.e.t.)	Heart of Midlothian	Alloa
15:00	Trouten 109' (pen.)			Stadium: Recreation Park; Referee: Gavin Duncan

28 November 2020	**St Mirren**	**2–1**	Aberdeen	Paisley
17:15	Durmuş 4'; McGrath 88'		McGinn 43'	Stadium: St Mirren Park; Referee: Don Robertson

29 November 2020	Celtic	**0–2**	**Ross County**	Glasgow
14:00			Stewart 39' (pen.); Iacovitti 84'	Stadium: Celtic Park; Referee: Kevin Clancy

29 November 2020	Falkirk	**0–4**	**Rangers**	Falkirk
17:00			Defoe 6'; Bassey 30'; Barišić 41'; Tavernier 51'	Stadium: Falkirk Stadium; Referee: Bobby Madden

=== Quarter-final ===
==== Draw ====
The quarter-final draw took place on 29 November 2020 following the Falkirk v Rangers match live on Premier Sports 1.

Teams in Bold advanced to the semi-finals.

Premiership	Championship
**Hibernian**; **Livingston**; Rangers; Ross County; **St Johnstone**; **St Mirren**	Alloa Athletic; Dunfermline Athletic

==== Matches ====
15 December 2020	Dunfermline Athletic	**1–1** (a.e.t.) (**3–4** p)	**St Johnstone**	Dunfermline
19:45	Wilson 113'		Rooney 94'	Stadium: East End Park; Referee: Don Robertson
	**Penalties**
	Watson (penalty missed); Wilson (penalty scored); Turner (penalty scored); Dow (penalty scored); O'Hara (penalty missed)		(penalty scored) Conway; (penalty scored) May; (penalty missed) Hendry; (penalty scored) Booth; (penalty scored) Craig

15 December 2020	Alloa Athletic	**1–2**	**Hibernian**	Alloa
20:00	Hanlon 34' (o.g.)		Doidge 62'; Jamieson 83' (o.g.)	Stadium: Recreation Park; Referee: David Munro

16 December 2020	**Livingston**	**2–0**	Ross County	Livingston
19:45	Sibbald 4'; Forrest 24'			Stadium: Almondvale Stadium; Referee: Steven McLean

16 December 2020	**St Mirren**	**3–2**	Rangers	Paisley
20:00	McGrath 40' (pen.), 53'; McCarthy 90+2'		Goldson 7'; Davis 88'	Stadium: St Mirren Park; Referee: David Dickinson

=== Semi-final ===
==== Draw ====
The draw for the semi-finals took place on 16 December 2020 following the St Mirren v Rangers match live on Premier Sports 1.

Teams in Bold advanced to the final.

Premiership
- Hibernian
- **Livingston**
- **St Johnstone**
- St Mirren

==== Matches ====
23 January 2021	**St Johnstone**	**3–0**	Hibernian	Glasgow
17:30	Kerr 35'; Rooney 49'; Conway 63'			Stadium: Hampden Park; Referee: Nick Walsh

24 January 2021	**Livingston**	**1–0**	St Mirren	Glasgow
16:00	Robinson 9'			Stadium: Hampden Park; Referee: David Munro

== Final ==
28 February 2021
14:00

St Johnstone	1–0	Livingston
Rooney 32'

Hampden Park, Glasgow
Referee: Don Robertson

== Top goalscorers ==
As of 28 February 2021

Rank	Player	Club	Goals
1	(Scotland) Alan Forrest	Livingston	7
2	(Netherlands) Manny Duku	Raith Rovers	5
2	(Scotland) Stevie May	St Johnstone	5
4	(Scotland) Euan Murray	Dunfermline Athletic	4
4	(Scotland) Ross Stewart	Ross County	4
4	(Republic of Ireland) Jamie McGrath	St Mirren	4
7	12 players		3

== Media coverage ==
The domestic broadcasting rights for the competition are held exclusively by Premier Sports who will broadcast between 12 and 16 Betfred Cup live matches per season as well as highlights.

The following matches were broadcast live on UK television:

Round	Date	Match
Group Stage	6 October 2020	Heart of Midlothian v Inverness Caledonian Thistle
Group Stage	9 October 2020	Dunfermline Athletic v Falkirk
Group Stage	10 October 2020	Cove Rangers v Hibernian
Group Stage	13 October 2020	Heart of Midlothian v Raith Rovers
Group Stage	10 November 2020	St Johnstone v Dundee United
Group Stage	11 November 2020	St Mirren v Greenock Morton
Group Stage	15 November 2020	Hibernian v Dundee
Second Round	28 November 2020	St Mirren v Aberdeen
Second Round	29 November 2020	Celtic v Ross County; Falkirk v Rangers
Quarter-finals	15 December 2020	Alloa Athletic v Hibernian
Quarter-finals	16 December 2020	St Mirren v Rangers
Semi-finals	23 January 2021	St Johnstone v Hibernian
Semi-finals	24 January 2021	Livingston v St Mirren
Final	28 February 2021	St Johnstone v Livingston
