= 2019–20 Hibernian F.C. season =

Hibernian
2019–20 season
- Chairman: Ronald Gordon
- Manager: Paul Heckingbottom (until 4 November); Eddie May (caretaker); Jack Ross (from 15 November)
- Stadium: Easter Road; Leith, Edinburgh, Scotland (Capacity: 20,421)
- Premiership: 7th
- Scottish Cup: Semi-finals
- League Cup: Semi-finals
- Top goalscorer: League: Christian Doidge (12); All: Christian Doidge (19)
- Highest home attendance: 20,197 v Heart of Midlothian, 3 March
- Lowest home attendance: 14,486 v Ross County, 12 February
- Average home league attendance: 16,662
| Home colours | Away colours | Third colours |

The 2019–20 season was Hibernian's third consecutive season in the top tier of Scottish football, the Scottish Premiership, having been promoted from the Scottish Championship at the end of the 2016–17 season. Hibs finished seventh in the league, which was curtailed due to the COVID-19 pandemic. They lost to Celtic in the semi-finals of the League Cup and Hearts in the semi-finals of the Scottish Cup.

Sir Tom Farmer sold his majority ownership of Hibs in July 2019 to American businessman Ronald Gordon, who became chairman of the club.

== Results and fixtures ==
Win Draw Loss Postponed

=== Friendly matches ===
| 3 July 2019 Friendly | Arbroath | 3–2 | Hibernian | Arbroath |
| 19:45 BST | Doris 32', 48'; Spence 88' | Edinburgh Evening News | Allan 58'; Trialist (Moon) 89' | Stadium: Gayfield Park; Attendance: 1,031; Referee: Mike Roncone |

| 6 July 2019 Friendly | Dunfermline Athletic | 1–3 | Hibernian | Dunfermline |
| 15:00 BST | Murray 4' | Edinburgh Evening News | Jackson 48'; Horgan 72' (pen.); Kamberi 77' | Stadium: East End Park; Referee: Barry Cook |

| 9 July 2019 Friendly | Carlisle United | 3–4 | Hibernian | Carlisle |
| 19:45 BST | Bridge 30'; Hope 47'; McGregor 68' (o.g.) | Edinburgh Evening News | Kamberi 37'; Allan 73'; Doidge 86'; Campbell 90' | Stadium: Brunton Park; Attendance: 2,631; Referee: Anthony Backhouse |

| 30 July 2019 Friendly | Hibernian | 1–3 | Newcastle United | Edinburgh |
| 19:45 BST | Mallan 10' | Hibernian FC | Joelinton 16'; Longstaff 35'; Lascelles 73' | Stadium: Easter Road; Attendance: 12,557; Referee: John Beaton |

| 10 January 2020 Friendly | Hibernian | 2–1 | Willem II | Sotogrande |
| 12:00 CET | Shaw 75' (pen.), 90' | Edinburgh Evening News | Heerkens 30' |

=== Scottish Premiership ===
Despite winning their opening match, Hibs got off to a poor start to the league season. After they lost the first Edinburgh derby of the season, Hibs fan Irvine Welsh claimed that they were "favourites" for relegation.

Hibs eventually finished in seventh place. They had been in sixth place when the league season was suspended on 13 March due to the COVID-19 pandemic, but were awarded seventh place due to St Johnstone having a slightly higher points average.

| 3 August 2019 1 | Hibernian | 1–0 | St Mirren | Edinburgh |
| 15:00 BST | Allan 85' | BBC Sport | | Stadium: Easter Road; Attendance: 16,631; Referee: Euan Anderson |

| 11 August 2019 2 | Rangers | 6–1 | Hibernian | Glasgow |
| 15:00 BST | Defoe 9', 15', 74'; Morelos 77', 89'; Ojo 90+2' | BBC Sport | Horgan 40' | Stadium: Ibrox Stadium; Attendance: 49,718; Referee: John Beaton |

| 24 August 2019 3 | Hibernian | 2–2 | St Johnstone | Edinburgh |
| 15:00 BST | Jackson 25'; Kamberi 69' | BBC Sport | O'Halloran 68'; Kerr 90+4' | Stadium: Easter Road; Attendance: 15,315; Referee: Don Robertson |

| 31 August 2019 4 | Motherwell | 3–0 | Hibernian | Motherwell |
| 15:00 BST | Seedorf 23'; Donnelly 80' (pen.); Hylton 86' | BBC Sport | | Stadium: Fir Park; Attendance: 5,964; Referee: Steven McLean |

| 14 September 2019 5 | Kilmarnock | 2–0 | Hibernian | Kilmarnock |
| 15:00 BST | Millar 56'; El Makrini 79' | BBC Sport | | Stadium: Rugby Park; Attendance: 5,458; Referee: Kevin Clancy |

| 22 September 2019 6 | Hibernian | 1–2 | Heart of Midlothian | Edinburgh |
| 15:00 BST | Mallan 47' | BBC Sport | Ikpeazu 70'; Hickey 84' | Stadium: Easter Road; Attendance: 19,828; Referee: John Beaton |

| 28 September 2019 7 | Hibernian | 1–1 | Celtic | Edinburgh |
| 12:30 BST | Ajer 8' (o.g.) | BBC Sport | Christie 24' | Stadium: Easter Road; Attendance: 18,339; Referee: Kevin Clancy |

| 5 October 2019 8 | Aberdeen | 1–1 | Hibernian | Aberdeen |
| 15:00 BST | Cosgrove 86' | BBC Sport | Porteous 48' | Stadium: Pittodrie Stadium; Attendance: 13,880; Referee: Don Robertson |

| 19 October 2019 9 | Hamilton Academical | 1–1 | Hibernian | Hamilton |
| 15:00 BST | Cunningham 59' (pen.) | BBC Sport | Mallan 22' | Stadium: New Douglas Park; Attendance: 2,680; Referee: John Beaton |

| 26 October 2019 10 | Hibernian | 2–2 | Ross County | Edinburgh |
| 15:00 BST | Horgan 50'; Allan 56' | BBC Sport | Graham 74'; Chalmers 90' | Stadium: Easter Road; Attendance: 15,452; Referee: Steven McLean |

| 30 October 2019 11 | Hibernian | 2–2 | Livingston | Edinburgh |
| 19:45 GMT | Allan 62' (pen.); Boyle 90+2' | BBC Sport | Lawless 38'; Sibbald 41' | Stadium: Easter Road; Attendance: 14,662; Referee: Gavin Duncan |

| 9 November 2019 12 | St Johnstone | 1–4 | Hibernian | Perth |
| 15:00 GMT | May 90' | BBC Sport | Doidge 2', 17', 58'; Allan 48' | Stadium: McDiarmid Park; Attendance: 3,931; Referee: Andrew Dallas |

| 23 November 2019 13 | Hibernian | 3–1 | Motherwell | Edinburgh |
| 15:00 GMT | Doidge 21'; Kamberi 25'; Horgan 86' | BBC Sport | Polworth 9' | Stadium: Easter Road; Attendance: 15,984; Referee: John Beaton |

| 26 November 2019 14 | St Mirren | 1–2 | Hibernian | Paisley |
| 19:45 GMT | Morias 90+1' | BBC Sport | Doidge 28'; Mallan 82' (pen.) | Stadium: St Mirren Park; Attendance: 5,377; Referee: Alan Newlands |

| 30 November 2019 15 | Hibernian | 2–2 | Kilmarnock | Edinburgh |
| 15:00 GMT | Doidge 19'; Naismith 47' | BBC Sport | Bruce 66'; Del Fabro 90+3' | Stadium: Easter Road; Attendance: 16,180; Referee: Kevin Clancy |

| 4 December 2019 16 | Ross County | 2–1 | Hibernian | Dingwall |
| 19:45 GMT | Stewart 65', 75' | BBC Sport | Doidge 34' | Stadium: Victoria Park; Attendance: 4,196; Referee: David Munro |

| 7 December 2019 17 | Hibernian | 3–0 | Aberdeen | Edinburgh |
| 15:00 GMT | Boyle 52', 68'; Kamberi 74' | BBC Sport | | Stadium: Easter Road; Attendance: 16,767; Referee: Colin Steven |

| 15 December 2019 18 | Celtic | 2–0 | Hibernian | Glasgow |
| 15:00 GMT | Frimpong 39'; Édouard 66' | BBC Sport | | Stadium: Celtic Park; Attendance: 57,598; Referee: John Beaton |

| 20 December 2019 19 | Hibernian | 0–3 | Rangers | Edinburgh |
| 19:45 GMT | | BBC Report | Kent 4'; Aribo 8'; Defoe 53' | Stadium: Easter Road; Attendance: 19,540; Referee: Nick Walsh |

| 26 December 2019 20 | Heart of Midlothian | 0–2 | Hibernian | Edinburgh |
| 12:30 GMT | | BBC Sport | Boyle 6', 31' | Stadium: Tynecastle Park; Attendance: 19,313; Referee: Don Robertson |

| 29 December 2019 21 | Livingston | 2–0 | Hibernian | Livingston |
| 15:00 GMT | Guthrie 62', 77' | BBC Sport | | Stadium: Almondvale Stadium; Attendance: 4,902; Referee: Euan Anderson |

| 22 January 2020 22 | Hibernian | 2–1 | Hamilton Academical | Edinburgh |
| 19:45 GMT | Doidge 64'; Hanlon 86' | BBC Sport | Gogic 18' | Stadium: Easter Road; Attendance: 14,674; Referee: Andrew Dallas |

| 25 January 2020 23 | Motherwell | 0–0 | Hibernian | Motherwell |
| 15:00 GMT | | BBC Sport | | Stadium: Fir Park; Attendance: 5,767; Referee: Colin Steven |

| 1 February 2020 24 | Hibernian | 2–2 | St Mirren | Edinburgh |
| 15:00 GMT | Allan 25'; Doidge 43' | BBC Sport | McCarthy 14'; Andreu 18' | Stadium: Easter Road; Attendance: 16,325; Referee: David Munro |

| 5 February 2020 25 | Rangers | 2–1 | Hibernian | Glasgow |
| 19:45 GMT | Edmundson 45+2'; Hagi 84' | BBC Sport | Hanlon 35' | Stadium: Ibrox Stadium; Attendance: 49,427; Referee: Bobby Madden |

| 12 February 2020 26 | Hibernian | 3–0 | Ross County | Edinburgh |
| 19:45 GMT | McNulty 7'; Doidge 41'; Jackson 84' | BBC Sport | | Stadium: Easter Road; Attendance: 14,486; Referee: Steven McLean |

| 16 February 2020 27 | Kilmarnock | 1–2 | Hibernian | Kilmarnock |
| 16:30 GMT | Burke 30' | BBC Sport | Docherty 28'; Jackson 45' | Stadium: Rugby Park; Attendance: 5,370; Referee: Alan Muir |

| 22 February 2020 28 | Hibernian | 1–1 | Livingston | Edinburgh |
| 15:00 GMT | Doidge 50' | BBC Sport | Taylor-Sinclair 56' | Stadium: Easter Road; Attendance: 15,553; Referee: Alan Newlands |

| 3 March 2020 29 | Hibernian | 1–3 | Heart of Midlothian | Edinburgh |
| 19:45 GMT | Hallberg 89' | BBC Sport | Clare 53' (pen.); Bozanic 65'; Washington 80' | Stadium: Easter Road; Attendance: 20,197; Referee: Kevin Clancy |

| 7 March 2020 30 | Aberdeen | 3–1 | Hibernian | Aberdeen |
| 15:00 GMT | Jackson 64' (o.g.); Considine 66'; Main 82' | BBC Sport | Doidge 39' | Stadium: Pittodrie Stadium; Attendance: 14,388; Referee: John Beaton |

=== Scottish Cup ===
Hibs were drawn away to Championship leaders Dundee United in the fourth round. They won that tie after a replay and were then drawn with Lowland League (fifth tier) side BSC Glasgow. A 4–1 win put Hibs into the quarter-final, where they were given a home draw against Championship side Inverness Caledonian Thistle. Inverness were the only club from outside the Premiership to have reached the quarter-final.

A 5–2 win against Inverness gave Hibs a place in the semi-final, which produced an Edinburgh derby with Hearts. That match was originally scheduled for 11 April, but was postponed due to the coronavirus pandemic. On 21 July, the Scottish Football Association announced that the semi-finals would be played on the weekend of 31 October / 1 November 2020. Hibs lost 2–1 after extra time in the semi-final, with Kevin Nisbet missing a penalty moments before Hearts scored their winning goal (also from a penalty).

| 19 January 2020 Fourth round | Dundee United | 2–2 | Hibernian | Dundee |
| 15:00 GMT | Shankland 45+3'; Appere 74' | BBC Sport | Doidge 8'; Boyle 47' | Stadium: Tannadice Park; Attendance: 9,400; Referee: Kevin Clancy |

| 28 January 2020 Fourth round replay | Hibernian | 4–2 | Dundee United | Edinburgh |
| 19:45 GMT | Allan 40' (pen.); Doidge 60', 73', 90+1' | BBC Sport | Shankland 10'; Sporle 67' | Stadium: Easter Road; Attendance: 10,451; Referee: Kevin Clancy |

| 9 February 2020 Fifth round | BSC Glasgow | 1–4 | Hibernian | Alloa |
| 12:01 GMT | Smith 38' | BBC Sport | McNulty 11', 30', 69'; Docherty 85' | Stadium: Recreation Park; Attendance: 2,120; Referee: Alan Newlands |

| 28 February 2020 Quarter-finals | Hibernian | 5–2 | Inverness Caledonian Thistle | Edinburgh |
| 19:45 GMT | Jackson 38'; Allan 58'; Docherty 71'; Oméonga 81'; Gullan 84' | BBC Sport | Tremarco 73'; Todorov 88' | Stadium: Easter Road; Attendance: 9,937; Referee: Nick Walsh |

| 31 October 2020 Semi-finals | Heart of Midlothian | 2–1 (a.e.t.) | Hibernian | Glasgow |
| 17:00 GMT | Wighton 60'; Boyce 111' (pen.) | BBC Sport | Doidge 67' | Stadium: Hampden Park; Attendance: None (Note: Attendance restricted due to COVID-19 restrictions.); Referee: Willie Collum |

=== Scottish League Cup ===
Hibs entered the 2019–20 Scottish League Cup at the group stage, and a 2–0 win at Elgin City in their final match clinched a place in the last 16. Elgin player Kane Hester was booked during the match; he was later charged with conspiring to con betting company Bet365 by placing bets that he would receive a yellow card, but was found not proven.

Hibs were drawn at home to Championship club Greenock Morton in the last 16. Hibs needed extra time to defeat Morton and reach the quarter-finals, where they were drawn away to Kilmarnock. By winning a penalty shootout Hibs progressed to the semi-finals, where they were paired with holders Celtic.

Hibs lost 5–2 to Celtic in the semi-final. Two days later, and with the team sitting in 10th place in the league, head coach Paul Heckingbottom was sacked by Hibs.

==== Group stage ====
| 13 July 2019 1 | Stirling Albion | 1–1 (4 – 5 p) | Hibernian | Stirling |
| 15:00 BST | Wilson 70' | BBC Sport | Allan 44' (pen.) | Stadium: Forthbank Stadium; Attendance: 2,184; Referee: Greg Aitken |
| | Penalties |
| | Mackin (penalty scored); Wilson (penalty scored); Lowdon (penalty scored); Docherty (penalty missed); Peters (penalty scored); Truesdale (penalty missed) | | James (penalty scored); Horgan (penalty scored); Allan (penalty missed); Mallan (penalty scored); Whittaker (penalty scored); Murray (penalty scored) |

| 20 July 2019 2 | Hibernian | 2–0 | Alloa Athletic | Edinburgh |
| 15:00 BST | Doidge 68'; James 84' | BBC Sport | | Stadium: Easter Road; Attendance: 5,470; Referee: Kevin Clancy |

| 23 July 2019 3 | Hibernian | 3–0 | Arbroath | Edinburgh |
| 19:45 BST | Kamberi 3'; Allan 44' (pen.); Murray 87' | BBC Sport | | Stadium: Easter Road; Attendance: 4,769; Referee: Bobby Madden |

| 26 July 2019 4 | Elgin City | 0–2 | Hibernian | Elgin |
| 19:45 BST | | BBC Sport | Newell 10'; Kamberi 62' | Stadium: Borough Briggs; Attendance: 2,106; Referee: Willie Collum |

==== Knockout phase ====
| 17 August 2019 Second round | Hibernian | 5–3 (a.e.t.) | Greenock Morton | Edinburgh |
| 15:00 BST | Allan 20'; Vela 32'; Kamberi 55', 104'; Doidge 120' | BBC Sport | McHugh 39'; Stevenson 45' (o.g.); Whittaker 90+1' (o.g.) | Stadium: Easter Road; Attendance: 6,557; Referee: Alan Muir |

| 25 September 2019 Quarter-finals | Kilmarnock | 0–0 (a.e.t.) (4–5 p) | Hibernian | Kilmarnock |
| 19:45 BST | | BBC Sport | | Stadium: Rugby Park; Attendance: 4,780; Referee: William Collum |

| 2 November 2019 Semi-finals | Hibernian | 2–5 | Celtic | Glasgow |
| 17:30 GMT | Hallberg 36'; Kamberi 58' | BBC Sport | Elyounoussi 17', 44'; McGregor 21'; Brown 56', 90' | Stadium: Hampden Park; Attendance: 46,782; Referee: Bobby Madden |

== Player statistics ==
As of 7 March 2020

| No. | Pos | Player | Premiership | | League Cup | | Scottish Cup | | Total | |
| No. | Pos | Player | Apps | Goals | Apps | Goals | Apps | Goals | Apps | Goals |
Goalkeepers
| 1 | GK | (Israel) Ofir Marciano (Note: Includes one starting appearance in the delayed Scottish Cup semi-final, recorded under the 2020–21 season by some resources.) | 19 | 0 | 2 | 0 | 5 | 0 | 26 | 0 |
| 28 | GK | (Wales) Chris Maxwell | 12 | 0 | 5 | 0 | 0 | 0 | 17 | 0 |
Defenders
| 2 | DF | (Scotland) David Gray | 4 | 0 | 1 | 0 | 1 | 0 | 6 | 0 |
| 3 | DF | (Scotland) Steven Whittaker | 7 | 0 | 4 | 0 | 4 | 0 | 15 | 0 |
| 4 | DF | (Scotland) Paul Hanlon | 30 | 2 | 6 | 0 | 5 | 0 | 41 | 2 |
| 6 | DF | (Scotland) Paul McGinn | 7 | 0 | 0 | 0 | 3 | 0 | 10 | 0 |
| 16 | DF | (Scotland) Lewis Stevenson | 27 | 0 | 3 | 0 | 4 | 0 | 34 | 0 |
| 17 | DF | (Wales) Tom James | 6 | 0 | 5 | 1 | 1 | 0 | 12 | 1 |
| 18 | DF | (England) Adam Jackson | 14 | 3 | 6 | 0 | 2 | 1 | 22 | 4 |
| 21 | DF | (Scotland) Jason Naismith | 13 | 1 | 0 | 0 | 1 | 0 | 14 | 1 |
| 24 | DF | (Scotland) Darren McGregor | 6 | 0 | 3 | 0 | 1 | 0 | 10 | 0 |
| 25 | DF | (Scotland) Josh Doig | 0 | 0 | 0 | 0 | 1 | 0 | 1 | 0 |
| 25 | DF | (Scotland) Ryan Porteous | 14 | 1 | 1 | 0 | 2 | 0 | 17 | 1 |
| 43 | DF | (Scotland) Sean Mackie (Note: Includes one substitute appearance in the delayed Scottish Cup semi-final, recorded under the 2020–21 season by some resources.) | 2 | 0 | 2 | 0 | 1 | 0 | 5 | 0 |
Midfielders
| 6 | MF | (England) Josh Vela | 9 | 0 | 5 | 1 | 0 | 0 | 14 | 1 |
| 7 | MF | (Republic of Ireland) Daryl Horgan | 28 | 3 | 7 | 0 | 3 | 0 | 38 | 3 |
| 8 | MF | (Lithuania) Vykintas Slivka | 16 | 0 | 2 | 0 | 0 | 0 | 18 | 0 |
| 10 | MF | (Australia) Martin Boyle | 20 | 5 | 4 | 0 | 5 | 1 | 29 | 6 |
| 11 | MF | (England) Joe Newell | 19 | 0 | 4 | 1 | 2 | 0 | 25 | 1 |
| 14 | MF | (Scotland) Stevie Mallan | 20 | 3 | 6 | 0 | 1 | 0 | 27 | 3 |
| 15 | MF | (Scotland) Greg Docherty | 6 | 1 | 0 | 0 | 2 | 2 | 8 | 3 |
| 19 | MF | (Scotland) Glenn Middleton | 6 | 0 | 2 | 0 | 0 | 0 | 8 | 0 |
| 20 | MF | (Sweden) Melker Hallberg | 20 | 1 | 2 | 1 | 3 | 0 | 25 | 2 |
| 23 | MF | (Scotland) Scott Allan | 30 | 5 | 7 | 3 | 3 | 2 | 40 | 10 |
| 33 | MF | (Scotland) Fraser Murray | 7 | 0 | 4 | 1 | 2 | 0 | 13 | 1 |
| 40 | MF | (Belgium) Stéphane Oméonga | 8 | 0 | 0 | 0 | 2 | 1 | 10 | 1 |
| 45 | MF | (Scotland) Josh Campbell | 0 | 0 | 2 | 0 | 0 | 0 | 2 | 0 |
Forwards
| 9 | FW | (Wales) Christian Doidge (Note: Includes one goal in the delayed Scottish Cup semi-final, recorded under the 2020–21 season by some resources.) | 28 | 12 | 6 | 2 | 5 | 5 | 39 | 19 |
| 13 | FW | (Scotland) Marc McNulty | 6 | 1 | 0 | 0 | 2 | 3 | 8 | 4 |
| 22 | FW | (Switzerland) Florian Kamberi | 20 | 3 | 5 | 5 | 2 | 0 | 27 | 8 |
| 32 | FW | (Scotland) Oli Shaw | 4 | 0 | 4 | 0 | 0 | 0 | 8 | 0 |
| 47 | FW | (Scotland) Jamie Gullan | 5 | 0 | 0 | 0 | 2 | 1 | 7 | 1 |
Signed in 2020–21
| 7 | MF | (Scotland) Kyle Magennis | 0 | 0 | 0 | 0 | 1 | 0 | 1 | 0 |
| 13 | MF | (Cyprus) Alex Gogic | 0 | 0 | 0 | 0 | 1 | 0 | 1 | 0 |
| 15 | FW | (Scotland) Kevin Nisbet | 0 | 0 | 0 | 0 | 1 | 0 | 1 | 0 |
| 18 | FW | (Scotland) Jamie Murphy | 0 | 0 | 0 | 0 | 1 | 0 | 1 | 0 |

Notes

1. Due to the postponement of the 2019–20 Scottish Cup, players signed in the following season were eligible to participate from the semi-final stage.

== Club statistics ==
=== League table ===
| Pos | Team | Pld | W | D | L | GF | GA | GD | Pts | PPG | Qualification or relegation (Note: All play-off matches were cancelled, as clubs voted to curtail the season due to the COVID-19 pandemic.) |
|---|---|---|---|---|---|---|---|---|---|---|---|
| 5 | Livingston | 30 | 10 | 9 | 11 | 41 | 39 | +2 | 39 | 1.30 | |
| 6 | St Johnstone | 29 | 8 | 12 | 9 | 28 | 46 | −18 | 36 | 1.24 | |
| 7 | Hibernian | 30 | 9 | 10 | 11 | 42 | 49 | −7 | 37 | 1.23 | |
| 8 | Kilmarnock | 30 | 9 | 6 | 15 | 31 | 41 | −10 | 33 | 1.10 | |
| 9 | St Mirren | 30 | 7 | 8 | 15 | 24 | 41 | −17 | 29 | 0.97 | |

Source: BBC SPFL
Rules for classification: 1) Points per game; 2) Goal difference; 3) Goals scored; 4) Head-to-head points; 5) Head-to-Head goal difference; 6) Play-off (only if deciding champion, UEFA competitions qualification, second stage group allocation or relegation).

=== Division summary ===
| Round | 1 | 2 | 3 | 4 | 5 | 6 | 7 | 8 | 9 | 10 | 11 | 12 | 13 | 14 | 15 | 16 | 17 | 18 | 19 | 20 | 21 | 22 | 23 | 24 | 25 | 26 | 27 | 28 | 29 | 30 |
|---|---|---|---|---|---|---|---|---|---|---|---|---|---|---|---|---|---|---|---|---|---|---|---|---|---|---|---|---|---|---|
| Ground | H | A | H | A | A | H | H | A | A | H | H | A | H | A | H | A | H | A | H | A | A | H | A | H | A | H | A | H | H | A |
| Result | W | L | D | L | L | L | D | D | D | D | D | W | W | W | D | L | W | L | L | W | L | W | D | D | L | W | W | D | L | L |
| Position | 5 | 7 | 7 | 9 | 9 | 11 | 11 | 10 | 11 | 11 | 9 | 8 | 6 | 6 | 6 | 6 | 6 | 6 | 7 | 5 | 6 | 6 | 6 | 6 | 6 | 6 | 6 | 6 | 6 | 6 |

Updated to match(es) played on 7 March 2020. Source:
A = Away; H = Home; W = Win; D = Draw; L = Loss

=== League Cup group table ===
| Pos | Team | Pld | W | PW | PL | L | GF | GA | GD | Pts | Qualification | HIB | ALO | ARB | ELG | STI |
|---|---|---|---|---|---|---|---|---|---|---|---|---|---|---|---|---|
| 1 | Hibernian | 4 | 3 | 1 | 0 | 0 | 8 | 1 | +7 | 11 | Qualification for the Second Round | — | 2–0 | 3–0 | — | — |
| 2 | Alloa Athletic | 4 | 2 | 0 | 1 | 1 | 8 | 8 | 0 | 7 | | — | — | — | 3–3p | 2–1 |
| 3 | Arbroath | 4 | 2 | 0 | 0 | 2 | 10 | 8 | +2 | 6 | | — | 2–3 | — | 2–1 | — |
| 4 | Elgin City | 4 | 1 | 1 | 0 | 2 | 7 | 7 | 0 | 5 | | 0–2 | — | — | — | 3–0 |
| 5 | Stirling Albion | 4 | 0 | 0 | 1 | 3 | 3 | 12 | −9 | 1 | | 1–1p | — | 1–6 | — | — |

Rules for classification: 1) goal difference, 2) goals scored, 3) away goals scored, 4) matches won, 5) away matches won, 6) drawing of lots.

=== Management statistics ===
| Name | From | To | P | W | D | L | Win% (Note: Win% is the percentage of matches won rounded to two decimal places.) |
|---|---|---|---|---|---|---|---|
| (England) Paul Heckingbottom | 1 July 2019 | 4 November 2019 | 18 | 5 | 8 | 5 | 27.78 |
| (Scotland) Eddie May (caretaker) | 4 November 2019 | 15 November 2019 | 1 | 1 | 0 | 0 | 100.00 |
| (Scotland) Jack Ross | 15 November 2019 | 31 October 2020 | 23 | 10 | 5 | 8 | 43.48 |

== Transfers ==
Including the expiry of loans, 12 first team players left Hibs after the 2018–19 season ended. Scott Allan had already been signed on a pre-contract agreement. After Josh Vela was signed in mid-July, manager Paul Heckingbottom said that his recruitment was complete "unless something unforeseen happens". After winger Martin Boyle suffered a knee injury, Glenn Middleton was signed on loan from Rangers.

=== Players in ===
| Player | From | Fee |
|---|---|---|
| (Scotland) Scott Allan | (Scotland) Celtic | Free |
| (England) Adam Jackson | (England) Barnsley | Free |
| (England) Joe Newell | (England) Rotherham United | Free |
| (Wales) Christian Doidge | (England) Forest Green Rovers | £250,000 |
| (Wales) Tom James | (England) Yeovil Town | Undisclosed |
| (England) Josh Vela | (England) Bolton Wanderers | Free |
| (Sweden) Melker Hallberg | (Sweden) Vejle BK | Free |
| (Hungary) Ádám Bogdán | (England) Liverpool | Free |
| (Scotland) Paul McGinn | (Scotland) St Mirren | Undisclosed |

=== Players out ===
| Player | To | Fee |
|---|---|---|
| (England) Marvin Bartley | (Scotland) Livingston | Free |
| (Australia) Mark Milligan | (England) Southend United | Free |
| (Burundi) Gael Bigirimana | (England) Solihull Moors | Free |
| (United States) Jonathan Spector | Retired | |
| (Netherlands) Miquel Nelom | (Netherlands) Willem II | Free |
| (Scotland) Ross Laidlaw | (Scotland) Ross County | Free |
| (Scotland) Lewis Allan | (Scotland) Raith Rovers | Free |
| (England) Josh Vela | (England) Shrewsbury Town | Free |
| (Scotland) Oli Shaw | (Scotland) Ross County | Undisclosed |

=== Loans in ===
| Player | From |
|---|---|
| (Wales) Chris Maxwell | (England) Preston North End |
| (Scotland) Glenn Middleton | (Scotland) Rangers |
| (Scotland) Jason Naismith | (England) Peterborough United |
| (Belgium) Stéphane Oméonga | (Italy) Genoa |
| (Scotland) Marc McNulty | (England) Reading |
| (Scotland) Greg Docherty | (Scotland) Rangers |

=== Loans out ===
| Player | To |
|---|---|
| (Poland) Kevin Dąbrowski | (Scotland) Cowdenbeath |
| (Scotland) Tommy Block | (Scotland) Queen's Park |
| (Scotland) Jack Hodge | (Scotland) Civil Service Strollers |
| (Scotland) Callum Yeats | (Scotland) Civil Service Strollers |
| (Scotland) Jamie Gullan | (Scotland) Raith Rovers |
| (Scotland) Ben Stirling | (Scotland) Arbroath |
| (Scotland) Josh Campbell | (Scotland) Arbroath |
| (Scotland) Sean Mackie | (Scotland) Dundee |
| (Canada) Kosovar Sadiki | (Republic of Ireland) Finn Harps |
| (Scotland) Ben Stirling | (Scotland) Alloa Athletic |
| (Scotland) Ryan Shanley | (Scotland) Forfar Athletic |
| (Switzerland) Florian Kamberi | (Scotland) Rangers |
| (Scotland) Josh Doig | (Scotland) Queen's Park |
| (Scotland) Innes Murray | (Scotland) Airdrieonians |

== See also ==
- List of Hibernian F.C. seasons
