= 2017–18 Greenock Morton F.C. season =

Greenock Morton
2017-18 season
- Chairman: Douglas Rae
- Manager: Jim Duffy
- Stadium: Cappielow Park
- Championship: Seventh Place
- League Cup: Group stage
- Challenge Cup: First round
- Scottish Cup: Quarter-final
- Top goalscorer: League: Gary Harkins (8); All: Gary Harkins & Bob McHugh (8)
- Highest home attendance: 4,661 v St Mirren, Championship, 12 August 2017
- Lowest home attendance: 1,036 v Livingston, Challenge Cup, 15 August 2017
- Average home league attendance: 1,985
Home colours	Away colours

Season 2017–18 saw Greenock Morton compete in the Scottish Championship the second tier of Scottish football, having finished fourth in 2016-17. Morton also competed in the Challenge Cup, Scottish League Cup and the Scottish Cup.

== Fixtures and results ==
Win Draw Loss Upcoming fixture

=== Pre–Season ===
1 July 2017 Friendly	Stenhousemuir	0 – 3	Greenock Morton	Stenhousemuir
14:00		Report	McHugh 39'; Thomson 59'; Armour 70'	Stadium: Ochilview Park; Referee: Stephen Finnie

8 July 2017 Friendly	Turriff United	1 – 6	Greenock Morton	Turriff
15:00	Miller 81'	Report	Thomson 19'; McHugh 30', 37', 53'; Tidser 67' (pen.); Tiffoney 83'	Stadium: The Haughs; Referee: Liam Duncan

=== Scottish Championship ===
5 August 2017 1	Dumbarton	0 – 0	Greenock Morton	Dumbarton
15:00		Report		Stadium: Dumbarton Football Stadium; Attendance: 1,161; Referee: Steven Kirkland

12 August 2017 2	Greenock Morton	4 – 1	St Mirren	Greenock
15:00	Tidser 26' (pen.), 50' (pen.); McHugh 72'; Murdoch 77'	Report	Smith 41'	Stadium: Cappielow; Attendance: 4,661; Referee: Willie Collum

19 August 2017 3	Inverness Caledonian Thistle	1 – 1	Greenock Morton	Inverness
15:00	Warren 19'	Report	Thomson 51'	Stadium: Caledonian Stadium; Attendance: 2,202; Referee: Stephen Finnie

26 August 2017 4	Greenock Morton	0 – 1	Livingston	Greenock
15:00		Report	Danny Mullen 60'	Stadium: Cappielow; Attendance: 1,599; Referee: Euan Anderson

9 September 2017 5	Greenock Morton	3 – 2	Dunfermline Athletic	Greenock
15:00	Thomson 46'; Harkins 73'; Quitongo 90+3'	Report	Cardle 9'; Higginbotham 33' (pen.)	Stadium: Cappielow; Attendance: 1,918; Referee: Kevin Clancy

16 September 2017 6	Queen of the South	1 – 2	Greenock Morton	Palmerston Park
15:00	Lyle 21'	Report	Forbes 16'; Quitongo 20'	Attendance: 1,725; Referee: Newlands; Man of the Match: Lyle

23 September 2017 7	Dundee United	2 – 1	Greenock Morton	Tannadice Park
15:00	Keatings 65'; McDonald 83'	Report	McHugh 75'	Attendance: 5,569; Referee: Alan Muir

30 September 2017 8	Greenock Morton	0 – 1	Dunfermline Athletic	Greenock
15:00	Lamie (yellow card) 90'	Report	McKee 62'	Stadium: Cappielow; Attendance: 1,992; Referee: John McKendrick

14 October 2017 9	Brechin City	0 – 1	Greenock Morton	Brechin
15:00		Report	Murdoch 81'	Stadium: Glebe Park; Attendance: 624; Referee: Colin Steven

21 October 2017 10	Greenock Morton	1 – 1	Dumbarton	Greenock
15:00	McHugh 50'	Report	Stewart 5'	Stadium: Cappielow; Attendance: 1,428; Referee: Barry Cook

28 October 2017 11	St Mirren	2 – 2	Greenock Morton	St Mirren Park
15:00	McShane 66' (pen.); Reilly 72', (yellow card) 83'; Buchanan (yellow card) 78'	BBC Report	O'Ware (yellow card) 64'; Doyle (yellow card) 66'; Forbes (yellow card) 66'; Murdoch 68'; Harkins 79' (pen.); Oliver (yellow card) 90+2'	Attendance: 5,496; Referee: Steven McLean

4 November 2017 12	Greenock Morton	1 – 2	Queen of the South	Greenock
15:00	Harkins 7' (pen.)	Report	Dobbie (yellow card) 41', (goal) 43'; Fordyce 47'; McFadden (yellow card) 63'; Jacobs (yellow card) 73'	Stadium: Cappielow Park; Attendance: 1,677; Referee: Mat Northcroft

21 November 2017 13	Dunfermline Athletic	1 – 1	Greenock Morton	Dunfermline
19:45	Ryan 21'; Murdoch (yellow card) 40'; Williamson (yellow card) 41'	Report	Oliver 34'	Stadium: East End Park; Attendance: 4,816; Referee: Finnie

25 November 2017 14	Falkirk	0 – 3	Greenock Morton	Falkirk
15:00	Muirhead (yellow card) 9'; Tumilty (yellow card) 73'	Report	Harkins 9'; Lamie (yellow card) 11'; Forbes (yellow card) 27'; Thomson 42', 61'	Stadium: Falkirk Stadium; Attendance: 4,361; Referee: Greg Aitken

2 December 2017 15	Greenock Morton	4 – 1	Brechin City	Greenock
15:00	Oliver 4'; Murdoch (yellow card) 12'; Tiffoney 44'; Harkins 72' (pen.); Quitongo 83'	Report	Layne 41', (yellow card) 78'	Stadium: Cappielow; Attendance: 1,388; Referee: Alan Newlands

9 December 2017 16	Greenock Morton	0 – 2	Dundee United	Greenock
15:00	Lamie (yellow card) 90+5'	Report	Durnan (yellow card) 45+1'; King 61', 90+4'	Stadium: Cappielow; Attendance: 2,021; Referee: Gavin Duncan

23 December 2017 17	Greenock Morton	1 – 0	Inverness Caledonian Thistle	Greenock
	Harkins 22' (pen.); Quitongo (yellow card) 75'	Report	Baird (yellow card) 16'; Raven (red card) 22'; Vigurs (yellow card) 57'; Polworth (yellow card) 69'; Donaldson (yellow card) 90+3'	Stadium: Cappielow; Attendance: 1,547; Referee: Colin Steven

2 January 2018 18	Greenock Morton	1 – 1	St Mirren	Greenock
15:00	Thomson (yellow card) 34'; Harkins (yellow card) 50'; Doyle (yellow card) 69'; O'Ware 80'; Oliver (yellow card) 82'	Report	Morgan 25'; Magennis (yellow card) 68'; McGinn (yellow card) 69'	Stadium: Cappielow; Attendance: 4,126; Referee: Kevin Clancy

6 January 2018 19	Brechin City	1 – 1	Greenock Morton	Brechin
15:00	McLennan 7'	Report	McHugh 12'	Stadium: Glebe Park; Attendance: 694; Referee: John McKendrick

13 January 2018 20	Greenock Morton	0 – 1	Falkirk	Greenock
15:00	Lamie (yellow card) 13'; Harkins (yellow card) 51'	Report	Sibbald 20'	Stadium: Cappielow; Attendance: 2,084; Referee: Andrew Dallas

27 January 2018 21	Dundee United	0 – 3	Greenock Morton	Dundee
15:00	Quinn (yellow card) 59'; Kadded (yellow card) 69'	Report	O'Ware 35'; Tiffoney 47'; Harkins (yellow card) 49'; Ross (yellow card) 66'; Iredale 80'	Stadium: Tannadice Park; Attendance: 5,730; Referee: Cook

3 February 2018 22	Greenock Morton	2 – 1	Dunfermline Athletic	Greenock, Scotland
15:00	Tidser 37'; Harkins (yellow card) 88'; Oliver 90'	Report	Beadling 23'; Craigen (yellow card) 51'; McManus (yellow card) 72'	Stadium: Cappielow; Attendance: 1,588; Referee: Gavin Duncan

17 February 2018 23	Queen of the South	1 – 1	Greenock Morton	Dumfries
15:00	Dobbie 33'; Dykes (yellow card) 45+1'	Report	Oliver 55', (yellow card) 83'; Gasparotto (yellow card) 57'; Lamie (yellow card) 90+3'	Stadium: Palmerston Park; Attendance: 1,489; Referee: Kevin Clancy

20 February 2018 24	Dumbarton	0 – 1	Greenock Morton	Dumbarton
19:45	Wilson (yellow card) 28'	Report	Gasparotto (yellow card) 39'; O'Ware 74'	Stadium: Dumbarton Football Stadium; Attendance: 833; Referee: Don Robertson

24 February 2018 25	Inverness Caledonian Thistle	0 – 2	Greenock Morton	Inverness
15:00		Report	Tiffoney 28'; Harkins 70' (pen.); Purdue (yellow card) 90+1'	Stadium: Caledonian Stadium; Attendance: 2,359; Referee: Steven Kirkland

27 February 2018 26	Greenock Morton	0 – 1	Livingston	Greenock
	Doyle (yellow card) 80'	Report	Cadden 47'; De Vita (yellow card) 54'; Halkett (yellow card) 60'	Stadium: Cappielow; Attendance: 1,373; Referee: Euan Anderson

10 March 2018 27	Falkirk	3 – 1	Greenock Morton	Falkirk
15:00	Muirhead 4' (pen.); Nelson 18'; Jakubiak 30'; McGhee (yellow card) 41'; Blair (yellow card) 67'	Report	Murdoch (yellow card) 57'; Harkins 90+1', (yellow card) 90+2'	Stadium: Falkirk Stadium; Attendance: 4,218; Referee: Euan Anderson

13 March 2018 28	Livingston	1 – 1	Greenock Morton	Livingston
	Halkett (yellow card) 55'; Lithgow (yellow card) 41'; Byrne (yellow card) 59' (yellow-red card) 66'; Longridge 90+4'	Report	Harkins (yellow card) 68'; Oliver 88'	Stadium: Almondvale Stadium; Attendance: 862; Referee: Greg Aitken

17 March 2018 29	Dunfermline Athletic	0 – 0	Greenock Morton	Dunfermline
15:00		Report	O'Ware (yellow card) 11'	Stadium: East End Park; Attendance: 4,613; Referee: Andrew Dallas

24 March 2018 30	Greenock Morton	2 – 0	Brechin City	Greenock
15:00	Baird 50', 72'; Murdoch (yellow card) 68'	Report	Dyer (yellow card) 76'	Stadium: Cappielow; Attendance: 1,831; Referee: Mike Roncone

31 March 2018 31	Greenock Morton	1 – 1	Dundee United	Greenock
15:00	Harkins (yellow card) 87'; Ross 90+3'	Report	Stanton (yellow card) 37'; Mohsni 59'; Smith (yellow card) 83'	Stadium: Cappielow; Attendance: 2,319; Referee: Don Robertson

7 April 2018 32	Livingston	3 – 2	Greenock Morton	Livingston
15:00	Longridge 35'; Lithgow 53', 86'; Cadden (yellow card) 69'	Report	O'Ware 18'; Lamie (yellow card) 59', (goal) 69'; Tidser (yellow card) 85'	Stadium: Almondvale Stadium; Attendance: 1,028; Referee: Steven Kirkland

10 April 2018 33	Greenock Morton	3 – 2	Dumbarton	Greenock
19:45	Fraser 62'; Baird 69'; Iredale (yellow card) 85', (goal) 90+4'	Report	Walsh (yellow card) 44'; Handling 55', (yellow card) 65'; O'Ware 87' (o.g.); Stirling (yellow card) 90+1'	Stadium: Cappielow Park; Attendance: 1,134; Referee: Craig Charleston

14 April 2018 34	Greenock Morton	0 – 1	Queen of the South	Greenock
15:00	Harkins (yellow card) 31'	Report	Dykes (yellow card) 25', (goal) 69'; Jacobs (yellow card) 52'	Stadium: Cappielow Park; Attendance: 1,514; Referee: Stephen Finnie

21 April 2018 35	St Mirren	2 – 1	Greenock Morton	Paisley
15:00	Mullen 10'; Morgan 72', (yellow card) 72'	Report	Doyle 30'; Iredale (yellow card) 66'	Stadium: St Mirren Park; Attendance: 6,422; Referee: Bobby Madden

28 April 2018 36	Greenock Morton	0 – 3	Inverness Caledonian Thistle	Greenock
15:00	Harkins (yellow card) 7'; Murdoch (yellow card) 29'	Report	Oakley 20', 37'; Austin 55'; Trafford (yellow card) 59'	Stadium: Cappielow Park; Attendance: 1,539; Referee: Beaton

=== Scottish League Cup ===
==== Group stage ====
Results

15 July 2017 Group stage	Berwick Rangers	0 – 1	Greenock Morton	Berwick-upon-Tweed
15:00		Report	Fleming 33' (o.g.)	Stadium: Shielfield Park; Attendance: 701; Referee: Grant Irvine

18 July 2017 Group stage	Greenock Morton	2 – 2 (4 – 2 p)	Queen's Park	Greenock
19:45	McHugh 85'; Barr 90+2'	Report	Wharton 70'; Orr 81'	Stadium: Cappielow Park; Attendance: 1,220; Referee: Colin Steven

22 July 2017 Group stage	Motherwell	4 – 0	Greenock Morton	Motherwell
15:00	Dunne 3'; Cadden 25'; Tait 67'; Moult 72'	Report	Gary Harkins (red card) 39'	Stadium: Fir Park; Attendance: 3,113; Referee: Kevin Clancy

29 July 2017 Group stage	Greenock Morton	5 – 0	Edinburgh City	Greenock
15:00	McHugh 14', 90+2'; Quitongo 53'; Thomson 73', 79'	Report		Stadium: Cappielow Park; Attendance: 1,065; Referee: Mike Roncone

==== Group F Table ====
Pos	Team	Pld	W	PW	PL	L	GF	GA	GD	Pts	Qualification	MOT	GMO	QPA	EDC	BER
1	Motherwell (Q)	4	4	0	0	0	12	2	+10	12	Qualification for the Second Round	—	4–0	—	—	1–0
2	Greenock Morton	4	2	1	0	1	8	6	+2	8		—	—	p2–2	5–0	—
3	Queen's Park	4	2	0	1	1	9	9	0	7		1–5	—	—	3–0	—
4	Edinburgh City	4	0	1	0	3	3	12	−9	2		1–2	—	—	—	p2–2
5	Berwick Rangers	4	0	0	1	3	4	7	−3	1		—	0–1	2–3	—	—

Rules for classification: 1) goal difference, 2) goals scored, 3) away goals scored, 4) matches won, 5) away matches won, 6) drawing of lots.
(Q) Qualified to the phase indicated

=== Scottish Challenge Cup ===
15 August 2017 1st Round	Greenock Morton	0 – 2	Livingston	Greenock
19:45		Report	Todorov 25'; Mullen 70'	Stadium: Cappielow Park; Attendance: 1,036; Referee: Colin Steven

=== Scottish Cup ===
20 January 2018 Fourth round	Dunfermline Athletic	1 – 2	Greenock Morton	Dunfermline
15:00	McManus 57'	Report	Oliver 24'; Quitongo 85'	Stadium: East End Park; Attendance: 2,573; Referee: Alan Muir

10 February 2018 Fifth round	Greenock Morton	3 – 0	Dumbarton	Greenock
15:00	Ross 12'; Iredale 49'; McHugh 80'	Report		Stadium: Cappielow; Attendance: 1,746; Referee: Craig Thomson

3 March 2018 Quarter-Final	Celtic	3 – 0	Greenock Morton	Glasgow
15:00	Dembélé 62', 71' (pen.); Édouard 90'	Report		Stadium: Celtic Park; Attendance: 18,255; Referee: John Beaton

== Player statistics ==
As of 28 April 2018

=== All competitions ===
Position	Player	Starts	Subs	Unused subs	Goals	Red cards (red card)	Yellow cards (yellow card)
FW	(Scotland) Ben Armour	0	7	0	0	0	0
FW	(Scotland) John Baird (on loan from Inverness)	6	2	0	3	0	0
DF	(Scotland) Darren Barr	4	1	0	1	0	0
GK	(Northern Ireland) Conor Brennan	4	1	0	0	0	0
GK	(Scotland) Ross Doohan (on loan from Celtic)	0	0	2	0	0	0
DF	(Scotland) Michael Doyle	43	0	0	1	0	1
MF	(Scotland) Ben Eardley	0	1	0	0	0	0
MF	(Scotland) Ross Forbes	19	2	0	1	0	1
MF	(Scotland) Gary Fraser	3	3	0	1	0	0
DF	(Canada) Luca Gasparotto	12	1	0	0	0	0
GK	(Scotland) Derek Gaston	40	0	0	0	0	0
MF	(Scotland) Gary Harkins	34	7	0	8	1	0
DF	(Scotland) Darren Hynes	1	0	1	0	0	0
DF	(Australia) Jack Iredale	13	1	4	2	0	0
DF	(Scotland) Lee Kilday	0	0	0	0	0	0
DF	(Scotland) Ricki Lamie	35	1	1	0	0	2
MF	(Scotland) Ruaridh Langan	0	5	4	0	0	0
GK	(Scotland) Jamie McGowan	0	0	7	0	0	0
FW	(Scotland) Robert McHugh	19	13	0	8	0	1
MF	(Scotland) Connor McManus	5	2	2	0	0	1
MF	(Scotland) Andy Murdoch	41	1	0	1	0	0
DF	(Scotland) Thomas O'Ware	37	0	0	4	0	0
FW	(Scotland) Gary Oliver	29	8	0	6	0	0
MF	(Scotland) Jack Purdue	0	1	0	0	0	0
FW	(Scotland) Jai Quitongo	16	5	0	5	0	2
MF	(Scotland) Frank Ross (on loan from Aberdeen)	12	6	0	2	0	0
DF	(Scotland) Mark Russell	32	4	1	0	0	1
DF	(Scotland) Lewis Strapp	2	4	3	0	0	0
FW	(Scotland) Robert Thomson	20	9	0	6	0	0
MF	(Scotland) Michael Tidser	32	4	0	3	0	0
FW	(Scotland) Scott Tiffoney	20	17	3	3	0	0

== First team transfers ==
- From end of 2016-17 season, to last match of season 2017-18

=== In ===
Player	From	League	Fee
(Scotland) Robert Thomson	(Scotland) Dumbarton	Scottish Championship	Free
(Scotland) Robert McHugh	(Scotland) Falkirk	Scottish Championship	Free
(Scotland) Darren Barr (player/coach)	(Scotland) Dumbarton	Scottish Championship	Free
(Scotland) Gary Harkins	(Scotland) Ayr United	Scottish League One	Free
(Australia) Jack Iredale	(Australia) ECU Joondalup	National Premier Leagues Western Australia	Free
(Scotland) Connor McManus	(Scotland) Celtic	Scottish Premiership	Free
(Scotland) Ross Doohan	(Scotland) Celtic	Scottish Premiership	Loan
(Scotland) Cameron Hayes	(Scotland) Dumbarton	Scottish Championship	Free
(Scotland) Daniel Farrell	(Scotland) Rutherglen Glencairn	West of Scotland Super League First Division	Free
(Canada) Luca Gasparotto	(Scotland) Falkirk	Scottish Championship	Free
(Northern Ireland) Conor Brennan	(Northern Ireland) Ballymena United	NIFL Premiership	Free
(Scotland) Frank Ross	(Scotland) Aberdeen	Scottish Premiership	Loan
(Scotland) John Baird	(Scotland) Inverness	Scottish Championship	Loan
(Scotland) Gary Fraser	(Scotland) Partick Thistle	Scottish Championship	Loan

=== Out ===
Player	To	League	Fee
(England) Kudus Oyenuga	(England) Chelmsford City	National League South	Free
(Scotland) Lewis McIntyre	(Scotland) Stranraer	Scottish League One	Free
(Scotland) Lewis Strapp	(Scotland) Elgin City	Scottish League Two	Loan
(Scotland) Thomas Orr	(Scotland) Queen's Park	Scottish League Two	Free
(Scotland) Darren Barr	(Scotland) Stirling Albion	Scottish League Two	Free
(Scotland) Connor McManus	(Scotland) East Fife	Scottish League Two	Free

== Team statistics ==
=== League table ===
Pos	Team	Pld	W	D	L	GF	GA	GD	Pts	Promotion, qualification or relegation
5	Inverness Caledonian Thistle	36	16	9	11	53	37	+16	57	
6	Queen of the South	36	14	10	12	59	53	+6	52	
7	Greenock Morton	36	13	11	12	47	40	+7	50	
8	Falkirk	36	12	11	13	45	49	−4	47	
9	Dumbarton (R)	36	7	9	20	27	63	−36	30	Qualification for the Championship play-offs

Source: Soccerway
Rules for classification: 1) Points; 2) Goal difference; 3) Goals scored; 4) Points in head-to-head matches; 5) Goal difference in hth matches; 6). Goals scored in hth matches; 7). Play-off (only for deciding promotion, play-off participation and relegation).
(R) Relegated
