= 2019–20 Scottish League Cup group stage =

2019–20 Scottish League Cup (group stage)
Tournament details
- Country: Scotland
- Dates: 12 July 2019 – 28 July 2019
- Teams: 40

Tournament statistics
- Matches played: 80
- Goals scored: 248 (3.1 per match)
- Top goal scorer(s): Kevin Nisbet (5 goals)

The 2019–20 Scottish League Cup Group stage was played from 12 to 28 July 2019. A total of 40 teams competed in the group stage. The winners of each of the eight groups, as well as the four best runners-up progressed to the second round (last 16) of the 2019–20 Scottish League Cup.

== Format ==
The group stage consisted of eight groups of five teams. The four clubs competing in the UEFA Champions League (Celtic) and Europa League (Rangers, Kilmarnock, and Aberdeen) qualifying rounds were given a bye through to the second round. The 40 teams taking part in the group stage consisted of the other eight teams that competed in the 2018–19 Scottish Premiership, and all of the teams that competed in the 2018–19 Scottish Championship, 2018–19 Scottish League One and 2018–19 Scottish League Two, as well as the 2018–19 Highland Football League and the 2018–19 Lowland Football League champions.

The winners of each of the eight groups, as well as the four best runners-up, progressed to the second round (last 16), which will include the four UEFA qualifying clubs. At this stage, the competition reverts to the traditional knock-out format. The four group winners with the highest points total and the clubs entering at this stage were seeded, with the four group winners with the lowest points unseeded along with the four best runners-up.

The traditional point system of awarding three points for a win and one point for a draw was used, however, for each group stage match that finished in a draw, a penalty shoot-out took place, with the winner being awarded a bonus point.

The draw for the group stage took place on 28 May 2019 and was broadcast live on the SPFL YouTube channel.

== Teams ==
=== North ===
==== Seeding ====
Teams in Bold qualified for the second round.

Top seeds	Second seeds	Unseeded
01. **Hibernian**; 02. **Heart of Midlothian**; 03. St Johnstone; 04. **Dundee**	09. **Ross County**; 10. Dundee United; 11. Inverness CT; 12. Alloa Athletic	17. Arbroath; 18. **Forfar Athletic**; 19. Raith Rovers; 20. Montrose; 21. **East Fife**; 22. Stenhousemuir; 23. Brechin City; 24. Peterhead; 25. Stirling Albion; 26. Cowdenbeath; 27. Elgin City; 28. Cove Rangers

=== South ===
==== Seeding ====
Teams in Bold qualified for the second round.

Top seeds	Second seeds	Unseeded
05. **Motherwell**; 06. **Livingston**; 07. **Hamilton Academical**; 08. St Mirren	13. Ayr United; 14. **Greenock Morton**; 15. **Partick Thistle**; 16. **Dunfermline Athletic**	29. Queen of the South; 30. Falkirk; 31. Airdrieonians; 32. Dumbarton; 33. Stranraer; 34. Clyde; 35. Edinburgh City; 36. Annan Athletic; 37. Queen's Park; 38. Albion Rovers; 39. Berwick Rangers; 40. East Kilbride

== North ==
All times are BST (UTC +1).

=== Group A ===
Pos	Team	Pld	W	PW	PL	L	GF	GA	GD	Pts	Qualification	HOM	EFI	DUN	STE	COW
1	Heart of Midlothian	4	2	1	1	0	6	3	+3	9	Qualification for the Second Round	—	—	p1–1	2–1	—
2	East Fife	4	2	1	0	1	5	3	+2	8	Qualification for the Second Round	p1–1	—	—	2–0	—
3	Dundee United	4	2	0	1	1	6	4	+2	7		—	0–2	—	—	3–0
4	Stenhousemuir	4	1	0	0	3	4	6	−2	3		—	—	1–2	—	2–0
5	Cowdenbeath	4	1	0	0	3	2	7	−5	3		0–2	2–0	—	—	—

Rules for classification: 1) goal difference, 2) goals scored, 3) away goals scored, 4) matches won, 5) away matches won, 6) drawing of lots.

==== Matches ====
12 July 2019
19:45

Heart of Midlothian	1–1	Dundee United
Irving 44'		Shankland 9'
Penalties
Clare (penalty scored); Bozanic (penalty scored); Smith (penalty scored); Washington (penalty scored); Souttar (penalty scored)	5–3	(penalty missed) Clark; (penalty scored) McMullan; (penalty scored) Banks; (penalty scored) Bouhenna

Tynecastle Park, Edinburgh
Attendance: 9,091
Referee: Kevin Clancy
13 July 2019
15:00

Cowdenbeath	2–0	East Fife
Buchanan 17'; Taylor 27'

Central Park, Cowdenbeath
Attendance: 469
Referee: David Dickinson
16 July 2019
19:30

Stenhousemuir	1–2	Dundee United
A. Munro 70'		Watson 51'; Butcher 54'

Ochilview Park, Stenhousemuir
Attendance: 1,156
Referee: Steven Kirkland
16 July 2019
19:45

Cowdenbeath	0–2	Heart of Midlothian
		Halkett 8'; McDonald 22'

Central Park, Cowdenbeath
Attendance: 2,311
Referee: Colin Steven
19 July 2019
19:45

Dundee United	3–0	Cowdenbeath
Sporle 26'; Shankland 59'; Appéré 86'

Tannadice Park, Dundee
Attendance: 2,526
Referee: David Lowe
20 July 2019
15:00

East Fife	2–0	Stenhousemuir
Agnew 56', 85' (pen.)

Bayview Stadium, Methil
Attendance: 308
Referee: Duncan Williams
23 July 2019
19:45

Dundee United	0–2	East Fife
		Dunsmore 38'; Watt 51'

Tannadice Park, Dundee
Attendance: 2,778
Referee: Graham Beaton
24 July 2019
19:45

Heart of Midlothian	2–1	Stenhousemuir
Halkett 82', 87'		McGuigan 77'

Tynecastle Park, Edinburgh
Attendance: 7,299
Referee: Alan Newlands
27 July 2019
15:00

East Fife	1–1	Heart of Midlothian
Duggan 54'		Walker 15'
Penalties
Agnew (penalty scored); Wallace (penalty scored); Dowds (penalty scored); Duggan (penalty scored); Slattery (penalty missed); Murdoch (penalty missed); Davidson (penalty scored); Higgins (penalty scored); Dunsmore (penalty scored)	7–6	(penalty missed) Clare; (penalty missed) Bozanic; (penalty scored) Smith; (penalty scored) MacLean; (penalty scored) Halkett; (penalty scored) Keena; (penalty scored) Walker; (penalty scored) Mulraney; (penalty missed) Hickey

Bayview Stadium, Methil
Attendance: 1,998
Referee: David Munro
27 July 2019
15:00

Stenhousemuir	2–0	Cowdenbeath
McGuigan 33'; Todd 85' (o.g.)

Ochilview Park, Stenhousemuir
Attendance: 262
Referee: David Dickinson

=== Group B ===
Pos	Team	Pld	W	PW	PL	L	GF	GA	GD	Pts	Qualification	ROS	FOR	MON	STJ	BRE
1	Ross County	4	4	0	0	0	12	2	+10	12	Qualification for the Second Round	—	2–0	4–1	—	—
2	Forfar Athletic	4	3	0	0	1	9	4	+5	9	Qualification for the Second Round	—	—	—	2–1	3–0
3	Montrose	4	1	1	0	2	4	9	−5	5		—	1–4	—	1–0	—
4	St Johnstone	4	1	0	0	3	6	5	+1	3		1–2	—	—	—	4–0
5	Brechin City	4	0	0	1	3	1	12	−11	1		0–4	—	1–1p	—	—

Rules for classification: 1) goal difference, 2) goals scored, 3) away goals scored, 4) matches won, 5) away matches won, 6) drawing of lots.

==== Matches ====
13 July 2019
15:00

Forfar Athletic	3–0	Brechin City
Travis 20'; Kirkpatrick 45'; Jackson 65'

Station Park, Forfar
Attendance: 462
Referee: Duncan Williams
13 July 2019
15:00

Ross County	4–1	Montrose
Mullin 7'; Stewart 13', 46'; Mckay 85'		Allan 51'

Victoria Park, Dingwall
Attendance: 1,159
Referee: Chris Fordyce
16 July 2019
19:45

Brechin City	0–4	Ross County
		Stewart 33', 44'; Mckay 49'; Spittal 75'

Glebe Park, Brechin
Attendance: 272
Referee: Alan Newlands
16 July 2019
19:45

Montrose	1–0	St Johnstone
Masson 72'

Links Park, Montrose
Attendance: 866
Referee: Barry Cook
20 July 2019
15:00

Montrose	1–4	Forfar Athletic
Skelly 9' (pen.)		Hilson 25' (pen.), 45+2' (pen.); Travis 56', 71'

Links Park, Montrose
Attendance: 611
Referee: Craig Napier
21 July 2019
15:00

St Johnstone	1–2	Ross County
Tanser 8' (pen.)		Mckay 30', 45+1'

McDiarmid Park, Perth
Attendance: 1,648
Referee: Bobby Madden
24 July 2019
19:45

Ross County	2–0	Forfar Athletic
Graham 15', 76'

Victoria Park, Dingwall
Attendance: 1,002
Referee: Willie Collum
24 July 2019
19:45

St Johnstone	4–0	Brechin City
Tanser 6' (pen.); Kane 33'; Hendry 74'; Kennedy 76'

McDiarmid Park, Perth
Attendance: 1,497
Referee: Steven McLean
27 July 2019
15:00

Brechin City	1–1	Montrose
Reekie 73'		Campbell 57'
Penalties
Hill (penalty missed); Crawford (penalty missed); Knox (penalty scored); McIntosh (penalty scored)	2–4	(penalty missed) Rennie; (penalty scored) Milne; (penalty scored) Steeves; (penalty scored) Webster; (penalty scored) McLean

Glebe Park, Brechin
Attendance: 405
Referee: Kevin Graham
27 July 2019
15:00

Forfar Athletic	2–1	St Johnstone
Tapping 2'; Forbes 53'		Kennedy 65'

Station Park, Forfar
Attendance: 1,009
Referee: Euan Anderson

=== Group C ===
Pos	Team	Pld	W	PW	PL	L	GF	GA	GD	Pts	Qualification	HIB	ALO	ARB	ELG	STI
1	Hibernian	4	3	1	0	0	8	1	+7	11	Qualification for the Second Round	—	2–0	3–0	—	—
2	Alloa Athletic	4	2	0	1	1	8	8	0	7		—	—	—	3–3p	2–1
3	Arbroath	4	2	0	0	2	10	8	+2	6		—	2–3	—	2–1	—
4	Elgin City	4	1	1	0	2	7	7	0	5		0–2	—	—	—	3–0
5	Stirling Albion	4	0	0	1	3	3	12	−9	1		1–1p	—	1–6	—	—

Rules for classification: 1) goal difference, 2) goals scored, 3) away goals scored, 4) matches won, 5) away matches won, 6) drawing of lots.

==== Matches ====
13 July 2019
15:00

Arbroath	2–1	Elgin City
Kader 44'; Doris 90+2'		Sutherland 29'

Gayfield Park, Arbroath
Attendance: 485
Referee: Graham Beaton
13 July 2019
15:00

Stirling Albion	1–1	Hibernian
Wilson 70'		Allan 44' (pen.)
Penalties
Mackin (penalty scored); Wilson (penalty scored); Lowdon (penalty scored); Docherty (penalty missed); Peters (penalty scored); Truesdale (penalty missed)	4–5	(penalty scored) James; (penalty scored) Horgan; (penalty missed) Allan; (penalty scored) Mallan; (penalty scored) Whittaker; (penalty scored) Murray

Forthbank Stadium, Stirling
Attendance: 2,184
Referee: Greg Aitken
16 July 2019
19:45

Alloa Athletic	3–3	Elgin City
Trouten 54'; Buchanan 57'; Cawley 75'		Dingwall 30'; Sutherland 55'; Bronsky 88'
Penalties
Taggart (penalty scored); Hetherington (penalty scored); Flannigan (penalty scored); Trouten (penalty scored); Graham (penalty scored); Cawley (penalty missed); Stirling (penalty missed)	5–6	(penalty scored) Dingwall; (penalty scored) O'Keefe; (penalty scored) Sutherland; (penalty scored) MacEwan; (penalty scored) Bronsky; (penalty missed) Sopel; (penalty scored) Cooper

Recreation Park, Alloa
Attendance: 316
Referee: Gavin Ross
17 July 2019
19:45

Stirling Albion	1–6	Arbroath
Mackin 47'		Gold 1', 57'; McKenna 28'; Hamilton 82'; Spence 87', 90'

Forthbank Stadium, Stirling
Attendance: 474
Referee: Craig Napier
20 July 2019
15:00

Elgin City	3–0	Stirling Albion
Sutherland 7', 80'; Hester 13'

Borough Briggs, Elgin
Attendance: 507
Referee: Scott Lambie
20 July 2019
15:00

Hibernian	2–0	Alloa Athletic
Doidge 68'; James 84'

Easter Road, Edinburgh
Attendance: 5,470
Referee: Kevin Clancy
23 July 2019
19:45

Alloa Athletic	2–1	Stirling Albion
O'Hara 69'; Buchanan 86'		Wilson 51'

Recreation Park, Alloa
Attendance: 412
Referee: Grant Irvine
23 July 2019
19:45

Hibernian	3–0	Arbroath
Kamberi 3'; Allan 44' (pen.); Murray 87'

Easter Road, Edinburgh
Attendance: 4,769
Referee: Bobby Madden
26 July 2019
19:45

Elgin City	0–2	Hibernian
		Newell 10'; Kamberi 62'

Borough Briggs, Elgin
Attendance: 2,106
Referee: Willie Collum
27 July 2019
15:00

Arbroath	2–3	Alloa Athletic
Linn 18'; Thomson 74'		Buchanan 18'; Trouten 51', 78'

Gayfield Park, Arbroath
Attendance: 590
Referee: Barry Cook

=== Group D ===
Pos	Team	Pld	W	PW	PL	L	GF	GA	GD	Pts	Qualification	DND	ICT	PET	COV	RAI
1	Dundee	4	2	2	0	0	4	0	+4	10	Qualification for the Second Round	—	1–0	p0–0	—	—
2	Inverness CT	4	2	0	1	1	7	4	+3	7		—	—	—	3–2	4–1
3	Peterhead	4	1	1	1	1	3	4	−1	6		—	p0–0	—	2–1	—
4	Cove Rangers	4	1	0	1	2	6	5	+1	4		0–0p	—	—	—	3–0
5	Raith Rovers	4	1	0	0	3	4	11	−7	3		0–3	—	3–1	—	—

Rules for classification: 1) goal difference, 2) goals scored, 3) away goals scored, 4) matches won, 5) away matches won, 6) drawing of lots.

==== Matches ====
13 July 2019
15:00

Peterhead	2–1	Cove Rangers
Lyle 20'; McAllister 39' (pen.)		Masson 14' (pen.)

Balmoor Stadium, Peterhead
Attendance: 744
Referee: Gavin Duncan
13 July 2019
15:00

Raith Rovers	0–3	Dundee
		Nelson 14', 29' (pen.); Curran 75'

Stark's Park, Kirkcaldy
Attendance: 2,584
Referee: Lloyd Wilson
16 July 2019
19:45

Peterhead	0–0	Inverness Caledonian Thistle
Penalties
McAllister (penalty scored); Gibson (penalty scored); Leitch (penalty scored); Stevenson (penalty scored); Armour (penalty scored); Boyle (penalty scored); Brown (penalty scored); Dunlop (penalty scored); Eadie (penalty scored); Ferry (penalty scored); Fleming (penalty scored)	11–10	(penalty scored) White; (penalty scored) Donaldson; (penalty scored) Todorov; (penalty scored) Walsh; (penalty scored) Tremarco; (penalty scored) Carson; (penalty scored) Vincent; (penalty scored) Trafford; (penalty scored) McCart; (penalty scored) MacGregor; (penalty missed) Ridgers

Balmoor Stadium, Peterhead
Attendance: 606
Referee: Steven Reid
17 July 2019
19:45

Cove Rangers	0–0	Dundee
Penalties
Scott (penalty scored); Masson (penalty missed); H. Milne (penalty missed); Park (penalty scored); Higgins (penalty missed)	2–3	(penalty scored) McGhee; (penalty missed) Forster; (penalty missed) Nelson; (penalty scored) McDaid; (penalty scored) McGowan

Balmoral Stadium, Aberdeen
Attendance: 1,410
Referee: Scott Lambie
20 July 2019
15:00

Dundee	0–0	Peterhead
Penalties
McDaid (penalty missed); Curran (penalty scored); Cunningham (penalty scored); Nelson (penalty scored); McGowan (penalty scored)	4–2	(penalty scored) Gibson; (penalty missed) Leitch; (penalty scored) Smith; (penalty missed) Stevenson

Dens Park, Dundee
Attendance: 2,322
Referee: Greg Aitken
20 July 2019
15:00

Inverness Caledonian Thistle	4–1	Raith Rovers
White 6'; Donaldson 56'; Doran 58'; Todorov 90+2'		Allan 50'

Caledonian Stadium, Inverness
Attendance: 1,054
Referee: Gavin Ross
23 July 2019
19:45

Inverness Caledonian Thistle	3–2	Cove Rangers
White 38'; Keatings 55'; Todorov 71'		Megginson 45', 46'

Caledonian Stadium, Inverness
Referee: David Lowe
23 July 2019
19:45

Raith Rovers	3–1	Peterhead
Bowie 4'; Miller 21'; Allan 80'		Armour 88'

Stark's Park, Kirkcaldy
Attendance: 788
Referee: Chris Fordyce
27 July 2019
15:00

Cove Rangers	3–0	Raith Rovers
Masson 45'; Antoniazzi 52'; Glass 73'

Balmoral Stadium, Aberdeen
Attendance: 791
Referee: Craig Napier
28 July 2019
15:00

Dundee	1–0	Inverness Caledonian Thistle
Johnson 33'

Dens Park, Dundee
Attendance: 2,066
Referee: Nick Walsh

== South ==
All times are BST (UTC +1).

=== Group E ===
Pos	Team	Pld	W	PW	PL	L	GF	GA	GD	Pts	Qualification	MOT	GMO	QOS	DUM	ANN
1	Motherwell	4	4	0	0	0	13	0	+13	12	Qualification for the Second Round	—	4–0	—	—	4–0
2	Greenock Morton	4	2	1	0	1	14	8	+6	8	Qualification for the Second Round	—	—	p3–3	6–1	—
3	Queen of the South	4	1	1	1	1	10	10	0	6		0–3	—	—	—	p3–3
4	Dumbarton	4	1	0	0	3	3	12	−9	3		0–2	—	1–4	—	—
5	Annan Athletic	4	0	0	1	3	3	13	−10	1		—	0–5	—	0–1	—

Rules for classification: 1) goal difference, 2) goals scored, 3) away goals scored, 4) matches won, 5) away matches won, 6) drawing of lots.

==== Matches ====
13 July 2019
15:00

Annan Athletic	0–1	Dumbarton
		Tierney 63'

Galabank, Annan
Attendance: 264
Referee: Steven Kirkland
13 July 2019
15:00

Queen of the South	0–3	Motherwell
		Donnelly 71' (pen.); Seedorf 90'; Hylton 90+2'

Palmerston Park, Dumfries
Attendance: 1,956
Referee: Don Robertson
16 July 2019
19:45

Greenock Morton	6–1	Dumbarton
Neill 15' (o.g.); Grant 17'; Jacobs 23'; Strapp 31'; Sutton 45'; McHugh 69'		Neill 63'

Cappielow, Greenock
Attendance: 1,228
Referee: Grant Irvine
16 July 2019
19:45

Queen of the South	3–3	Annan Athletic
Murray 23'; Mercer 26'; Dobbie 42'		Douglas 34'; McLear 54'; Wooding-Holt 81'
Penalties
Dobbie (penalty scored); Oliver (penalty scored); Murray (penalty scored); Holt (penalty scored); Kidd (penalty scored)	5–4	(penalty scored) McLean; (penalty scored) Muir; (penalty scored) Bradley; (penalty scored) Nadé; (penalty missed) Sonkur

Palmerston Park, Dumfries
Attendance: 1,115
Referee: Alan Muir
19 July 2019
19:45

Motherwell	4–0	Greenock Morton
Scott 22', 66'; Hylton 76'; Donnelly 82'

Fir Park, Motherwell
Attendance: 3,167
Referee: Willie Collum
20 July 2019
15:00

Dumbarton	1–4	Queen of the South
Crossan 8'		Paton 10'; Oliver 13'; Dobbie 17'; Murray 22'

Dumbarton Football Stadium, Dumbarton
Attendance: 580
Referee: Gavin Duncan
23 July 2019
19:45

Annan Athletic	0–5	Greenock Morton
		Nesbitt 7', 83'; Cadden 33', 43'; Muirhead 90'

Galabank, Annan
Attendance: 478
Referee: Steven Reid
23 July 2019
19:45

Dumbarton	0–2	Motherwell
		Ilić 42'; Hartley 76'

Dumbarton Football Stadium, Dumbarton
Attendance: 1,394
Referee: Colin Steven
27 July 2019
15:00

Greenock Morton	3–3	Queen of the South
Sutton 31'; Cadden 45' (pen.); McHugh 56'		Kilday 4'; McAlister 62' (o.g.); Semple 78'
Penalties
Nesbitt (penalty scored); Jacobs (penalty scored); Sutton (penalty missed); Tumilty (penalty scored); Cadden (penalty scored)	4–3	(penalty scored) Mercer; (penalty missed) Oliver; (penalty scored) Murray; (penalty scored) Holt; (penalty missed) Kidd

Cappielow, Greenock
Attendance: 1,388
Referee: Steven Kirkland
27 July 2019
15:00

Motherwell	4–0	Annan Athletic
Donnelly 20', 89'; Polworth 44'; Scott 90+2'

Fir Park, Motherwell
Attendance: 2,763
Referee: Alan Newlands

=== Group F ===
Pos	Team	Pld	W	PW	PL	L	GF	GA	GD	Pts	Qualification	PAR	HAM	AIR	QPA	CLY
1	Partick Thistle	4	3	0	1	0	8	5	+3	10	Qualification for the Second Round	—	—	1–0	—	3–2
2	Hamilton Academical	4	2	1	1	0	8	5	+3	9	Qualification for the Second Round	p2–2	—	—	0–0p	—
3	Airdrieonians	4	1	1	0	2	7	8	−1	5		—	2–3	—	p2–2	—
4	Queen's Park	4	0	2	1	1	4	5	−1	5		1–2	—	—	—	p1–1
5	Clyde	4	0	0	1	3	6	10	−4	1		—	1–3	2–3	—	—

Rules for classification: 1) goal difference, 2) goals scored, 3) away goals scored, 4) matches won, 5) away matches won, 6) drawing of lots.

==== Matches ====
Due to pitch works at Hampden Park and Broadwood Stadium, Queen's Park played their home games at the Excelsior Stadium in Airdrie and Clyde played one home match at New Douglas Park in Hamilton and one at Ochilview Park, Stenhousemuir.

13 July 2019
15:00

Hamilton Academical	0–0	Queen's Park
Penalties
Oakley (penalty scored); Alston (penalty missed); McGowan (penalty scored); Ogboe (penalty scored); McKenna (penalty scored); McMann (penalty scored); MacKinnon (penalty missed)	5–6	(penalty scored) Galt; (penalty scored) Clark; (penalty scored) Moore; (penalty missed) McGrory; (penalty scored) Grant; (penalty scored) Agyeman; (penalty scored) Block

New Douglas Park, Hamilton
Attendance: 756
Referee: Nick Walsh
13 July 2019
15:00

Partick Thistle	1–0	Airdrieonians
Crighton 66' (o.g.)

Firhill Stadium, Glasgow
Attendance: 2,241
Referee: Grant Irvine
16 July 2019
19:45

Queen's Park	1–2	Partick Thistle
Kouider-Aïssa 56'		Miller 6'; Robson 36'

Excelsior Stadium, Airdrie
Attendance: 944
Referee: David Dickinson
17 July 2019
19:45

Clyde	1–3	Hamilton Academical
Syvertsen 57'		McMann 31'; Alston 50'; Smith 76'

Ochilview Park, Stenhousemuir
Attendance: 504
Referee: Euan Anderson
20 July 2019
15:00

Hamilton Academical	2–2	Partick Thistle
Cunningham 17', 54'		Williamson 16'; Gordon 73'
Penalties
Oakley (penalty scored); Cunningham (penalty scored); McKenna (penalty scored); Gogić (penalty scored); Smith (penalty scored); McMann (penalty scored)	6–5	(penalty scored) Bannigan; (penalty scored) Gordon; (penalty scored) Miller; (penalty scored) Mansell; (penalty scored) Jones; (penalty missed) De Vita

New Douglas Park, Hamilton
Attendance: 1,693
Referee: John Beaton
21 July 2019
15:00

Clyde	2–3	Airdrieonians
Goodwillie 75', 85' (pen.)		Roy 34' (pen.), 59'; Eckersley 39'

New Douglas Park, Hamilton
Attendance: 858
Referee: Steven McLean
24 July 2019
19:45

Airdrieonians	2–2	Queen's Park
Wedderburn 54'; Gallagher 82'		Summers 6'; Purdue 74'
Penalties
Gallagher (penalty scored); Carrick (penalty scored); Smith (penalty missed); Eckersley (penalty scored); Roy (penalty scored); Fordyce (penalty scored); O'Reilly (penalty scored); Wedderburn (penalty scored); Kerr (penalty scored); Millar (penalty scored); Hutton (penalty scored); Gallagher (penalty scored); Carrick (penalty scored)	12–11	(penalty missed) Galt; (penalty scored) Summers; (penalty scored) Clark; (penalty scored) Kouider-Aïssa; (penalty scored) Purdue; (penalty scored) Grant; (penalty scored) Main; (penalty scored) Moore; (penalty scored) Agyeman; (penalty scored) Little; (penalty scored) Muir; (penalty scored) Galt; (penalty missed) Summers

Excelsior Stadium, Airdrie
Attendance: 645
Referee: Lloyd Wilson
24 July 2019
19:45

Partick Thistle	3–2	Clyde
Gordon 12', 60'; Miller 49'		Wallace 25'; Bannigan 65' (o.g.)

Firhill Stadium, Glasgow
Attendance: 2,403
Referee: Kevin Graham
27 July 2019
15:00

Airdrieonians	2–3	Hamilton Academical
Smith 10'; Roy 24'		Cunningham 48' (pen.), 60' (pen.); Ogkmpoe 89'

Excelsior Stadium, Airdrie
Attendance: 814
Referee: Gavin Duncan
28 July 2019
14:30

Queen's Park	1–1	Clyde
Howie 86' (o.g.)		Smith 23'
Penalties
Kouider-Aïssa (penalty scored); Main (penalty missed); Grant (penalty missed); Lidouren (penalty scored); Clark (penalty scored); Martin (penalty scored); Summers (penalty scored)	5–4	(penalty missed) Wallace; (penalty scored) Lyon; (penalty missed) McStay; (penalty scored) Cuddihy; (penalty scored) Goodwillie; (penalty scored) Lamont; (penalty missed) Fitzpatrick

Excelsior Stadium, Airdrie
Attendance: 414
Referee: Scott Lambie

=== Group G ===
Pos	Team	Pld	W	PW	PL	L	GF	GA	GD	Pts	Qualification	LIV	AYR	FAL	STR	BER
1	Livingston	4	3	1	0	0	10	3	+7	11	Qualification for the Second Round	—	2–1	—	—	5–0
2	Ayr United	4	2	0	1	1	12	5	+7	7		—	—	2–1	2–2p	—
3	Falkirk	4	2	0	1	1	6	3	+3	7		1–1p	—	—	1–0	—
4	Stranraer	4	1	1	0	2	9	5	+4	5		1–2	—	—	—	6–0
5	Berwick Rangers	4	0	0	0	4	0	21	−21	0		—	0–7	0–3	—	—

Rules for classification: 1) goal difference, 2) goals scored, 3) away goals scored, 4) matches won, 5) away matches won, 6) drawing of lots.

==== Matches ====
13 July 2019
15:00

Berwick Rangers	0–7	Ayr United
		Moffat 21', 36'; McCowan 26', 70'; Doolan 35', 86'; McGuffie 42'

Shielfield Park, Berwick-upon-Tweed, England
Attendance: 603
Referee: Scott Lambie
13 July 2019
15:00

Falkirk	1–1	Livingston
Sammon 90'		Dykes 36'
Penalties
Telfer (penalty scored); Tidser (penalty missed); Sammon (penalty scored); McShane (penalty scored); Toshney (penalty missed)	3–4	(penalty scored) Jacobs; (penalty scored) Miller; (penalty scored) Lamie; (penalty scored) Souda

Falkirk Stadium, Falkirk
Attendance: 2,121
Referee: Alan Muir
16 July 2019
19:45

Falkirk	1–0	Stranraer
McManus 9'

Falkirk Stadium, Falkirk
Attendance: 1,838
Referee: Chris Fordyce
16 July 2019
19:45

Livingston	2–1	Ayr United
Souda 25'; Lamie 83'		Murdoch 51'

Almondvale Stadium, Livingston
Attendance: 1,097
Referee: Willie Collum
20 July 2019
15:00

Ayr United	2–1	Falkirk
McCowan 26'; Geggan 75'		McManus 42'

Somerset Park, Ayr
Attendance: 1,605
Referee: Barry Cook
20 July 2019
15:00

Stranraer	6–0	Berwick Rangers
Elliot 19'; Allan 38'; McManus 41'; Stewart 45' (pen.), 75' (pen.); Hilton 63'

Stair Park, Stranraer
Attendance: 247
Referee: Kevin Graham
23 July 2019
19:45

Berwick Rangers	0–3	Falkirk
		McManus 13'; Leitch 51'; Johnstone 76'

Shielfield Park, Berwick-upon-Tweed, England
Attendance: 509
Referee: Steven Kirkland
23 July 2019
19:45

Stranraer	1–2	Livingston
Elliott 57'		Lawless 42' (pen.); Souda 45'

Stair Park, Stranraer
Attendance: 402
Referee: Craig Napier
27 July 2019
15:00

Ayr United	2–2	Stranraer
Moffat 2'; Kelly 44'		Cummins 42', 86'
Penalties
McGuffie (penalty scored); Moffat (penalty scored); Forrest (penalty scored); Docherty (penalty scored); Bell (penalty scored); Harvie (penalty missed)	5–6	(penalty scored) Allan; (penalty scored) Hamill; (penalty scored) Dangana; (penalty scored) Cummins; (penalty scored) Hilton; (penalty scored) Thomson

Somerset Park, Ayr
Attendance: 1,430
Referee: Grant Irvine
27 July 2019
15:00

Livingston	5–0	Berwick Rangers
Lamie 2', 81'; Sibbald 16', 84'; Lithgow 24'

Almondvale Stadium, Livingston
Attendance: 692
Referee: Colin Steven

=== Group H ===
Pos	Team	Pld	W	PW	PL	L	GF	GA	GD	Pts	Qualification	DNF	ALB	STM	EKB	EDI
1	Dunfermline Athletic	4	3	0	0	1	13	3	+10	9	Qualification for the Second Round	—	6–0	—	4–0	—
2	Albion Rovers	4	2	0	1	1	3	7	−4	7		—	—	0–0p	—	2–1
3	St Mirren	4	1	1	1	1	3	3	0	6		2–3	—	—	—	1–0
4	East Kilbride	4	1	1	0	2	1	5	−4	5		—	0–1	p0–0	—	—
5	Edinburgh City	4	1	0	0	3	2	4	−2	3		1–0	—	—	0–1	—

Rules for classification: 1) goal difference, 2) goals scored, 3) away goals scored, 4) matches won, 5) away matches won, 6) drawing of lots.

==== Matches ====
13 July 2019
15:00

East Kilbride	0–1	Albion Rovers
		Stewart 25'

K-Park Training Academy, East Kilbride
Attendance: 230
Referee: Steven Reid
14 July 2019
15:00

St Mirren	2–3	Dunfermline Athletic
Cooke 63'; Mullen 65'		Dow 18'; Ryan 24'; Beadling 40'

St Mirren Park, Paisley
Attendance: 2,067
Referee: Steven McLean
17 July 2019
19:45

Dunfermline Athletic	6–0	Albion Rovers
Turner 2', 53'; Nisbet 19', 25', 45'; Comrie 40'

East End Park, Dunfermline
Attendance: 1,693
Referee: Lloyd Wilson
17 July 2019
19:45

St Mirren	1–0	Edinburgh City
Djorkaeff 88' (pen.)

St Mirren Park, Paisley
Attendance: 1,235
Referee: Greg Aitken
20 July 2019
15:00

East Kilbride	0–0	St Mirren
Penalties
Carmichael (penalty scored); Sinnamon (penalty missed); Reid (penalty scored); Kavanagh (penalty scored); Coll (penalty scored); Cairns (penalty scored); Brownlie (penalty scored)	6–5	(penalty scored) P. McGinn; (penalty scored) Andreu; (penalty scored) Flynn; (penalty scored) MacPherson; (penalty missed) Mullen; (penalty scored) Djorkaeff; (penalty missed) Cooke

K-Park Training Academy, East Kilbride
Referee: Colin Steven
20 July 2019
15:00

Edinburgh City	1–0	Dunfermline Athletic
Handling 87'

Ainslie Park, Edinburgh
Attendance: 1,035
Referee: Grant Irvine
23 July 2019
19:45

Albion Rovers	0–0	St Mirren
Penalties
Phillips (penalty scored); Fotheringham (penalty scored); Wharton (penalty missed); East (penalty scored); Osadolor (penalty missed)	3–4	(penalty scored) P. McGinn; (penalty scored) Andreu; (penalty scored) Flynn; (penalty scored) Magennis

Cliftonhill, Coatbridge
Attendance: 512
Referee: Barry Cook
23 July 2019
19:45

Edinburgh City	0–1	East Kilbride
		Brady 71'

Ainslie Park, Edinburgh
Attendance: 208
Referee: David Dickinson
27 July 2019
15:00

Albion Rovers	2–1	Edinburgh City
East 8'; Paterson 54'		Henderson 62' (pen.)

Cliftonhill, Coatbridge
Attendance: 157
Referee: Duncan Williams
27 July 2019
15:00

Dunfermline Athletic	4–0	East Kilbride
Nisbet 3', 50'; Coley 7'; Beadling 16'

East End Park, Dunfermline
Attendance: 1,607
Referee: David Lowe

== Best runners-up ==
Pos	Grp	Team	Pld	W	PW	PL	L	GF	GA	GD	Pts	Qualification
1	B	Forfar Athletic	4	3	0	0	1	9	4	+5	9	Qualification for the Second Round
2	F	Hamilton Academical	4	2	1	1	0	8	5	+3	9	Qualification for the Second Round
3	E	Greenock Morton	4	2	1	0	1	14	8	+6	8	Qualification for the Second Round
4	A	East Fife	4	2	1	0	1	5	3	+2	8	Qualification for the Second Round
5	G	Ayr United	4	2	0	1	1	12	5	+7	7	
6	D	Inverness Caledonian Thistle	4	2	0	1	1	7	4	+3	7	
7	C	Alloa Athletic	4	2	0	1	1	8	8	0	7	
8	H	Albion Rovers	4	2	0	1	1	3	7	−4	7	

Rules for classification: 1) goal difference, 2) goals scored, 3) away goals scored, 4) matches won, 5) away matches won, 6) drawing of lots.

== Qualified teams ==
Team	Qualified as	Qualified on	Notes
Heart of Midlothian	Group A Winner	27 July 2019	
Ross County	Group B Winner	24 July 2019	Seeded for the second round
Hibernian	Group C Winner	26 July 2019	Seeded for the second round
Dundee	Group D Winner	28 July 2019	
Motherwell	Group E Winner	27 July 2019	Seeded for the second round
Partick Thistle	Group F Winner	24 July 2019	
Livingston	Group G Winner	27 July 2019	Seeded for the second round
Dunfermline Athletic	Group H Winner	27 July 2019	
Forfar Athletic	Best 4 Runners Up	27 July 2019	
Hamilton Academical	Best 4 Runners Up	27 July 2019	
Greenock Morton	Best 4 Runners Up	27 July 2019	
East Fife	Best 4 Runners Up	28 July 2019	
