= Frank Ross (Scottish footballer) =

Scottish footballer

Personal information
- Full name: Francis Ross
- Date of birth: 18 February 1998 (age 28)
- Place of birth: Ellon, Scotland
- Height: 1.80 m (5 ft 11 in)
- Position: Midfielder

Youth career
- 2006–2015: Aberdeen

Senior career*
Years	Team	Apps	(Gls)
2015–2020	Aberdeen	12	(1)
2018	→ Greenock Morton (loan)	15	(1)
2019–2020	→ Ayr United (loan)		
2020–2022	Go Ahead Eagles	22	(0)
2023–2024	One Knoxville	45	(7)
2025	Butwal Lumbini		

International career^{‡}
2013	Scotland U15	1	(0)
2013	Scotland U16	5	(0)
2014–2015	Scotland U17	7	(1)
2015–2018	Scotland U19	6	(0)
- * Club domestic league appearances and goals as of 22 November 2024 ‡ National team caps and goals as of 8 November 2015

Francis Ross (born 18 February 1998) is a Scottish professional footballer who plays as a winger.

== Career ==
On 16 May 2015, Ross made his professional debut for Aberdeen in a league match against Dundee. On 3 July 2016, he signed a new two-year contract. On 3 December 2017, Ross scored his first senior goal for the Dons from a free-kick against Rangers. On 8 December, in the next match, he was given his first start for the club, in a 1–0 win against Dundee.

Ross was loaned to Championship club Greenock Morton in January 2018. On 8 July 2019, Ross moved on loan to Ayr United until January.

He signed a new one-year deal in May 2019 with the Dons, with the option of a further year. However, on 12 June 2020, Ross was released by Aberdeen.

On 20 August 2020, Ross signed for Dutch club Go Ahead Eagles, on a two-year contract with the option of a third.

In January 2021, he tore a cruciate ligament in the cup match against VVV Venlo.

Ross signed with One Knoxville SC on 14 December 2022, ahead of their inaugural season in USL League One, the American third division.

== Personal life ==
Ross is from Ellon and joined Aberdeen when he was eight years old.

His older sister Natalie Ross has played for the Scotland women's national football team and clubs including Arsenal and Celtic.

== Career statistics ==
As of 8 September 2020

Appearances and goals by club, season and competition
Club	Season	League			Scottish Cup		League Cup		Other		Total	
Club	Season	Division	Apps	Goals	Apps	Goals	Apps	Goals	Apps	Goals	Apps	Goals
Aberdeen	2014–15	Scottish Premiership	2	0	0	0	0	0	0	0	2	0
Aberdeen	2015–16	Scottish Premiership	2	0	0	0	0	0	0	0	2	0
Aberdeen	2016–17	Scottish Premiership	3	0	1	0	0	0	2 (Note: Appearances for Aberdeen under-20s in the Scottish Challenge Cup, in which age-restricted teams from the SPFL Premiership clubs compete against senior clubs.)	0	6	0
Aberdeen	2017–18	Scottish Premiership	4	1	0	0	0	0	2	1	6	2
Aberdeen	2018–19	Scottish Premiership	1	0	0	0	1	0	0	0	2	0
Aberdeen	2019–20	Scottish Premiership	0	0	0	0	0	0	0	0	0	0
Aberdeen	Total		12	1	1	0	1	0	4	1	18	2
Greenock Morton (loan)	2017–18	Scottish Championship	15	1	3	1	0	0	0	0	18	2
Ayr United (loan)	2019–20	Scottish Championship	0	0	0	0	2	0	0	0	2	0
Go Ahead Eagles	2020–21	Eerste Divisie	15	0	0	0	0	0	3	0	18	0
Career total			42	2	4	1	3	0	7	1	56	4
