= Darren Hynes =

Scottish footballer

Personal information
- Date of birth: 12 January 1999 (age 27)
- Place of birth: Glasgow, Scotland
- Positions: Defender; midfielder

Team information
- Current team: Clyde
- Number: 18

Youth career
- –2015: Aberdeen
- 2015–2021: Greenock Morton

Senior career*
Years	Team	Apps	(Gls)
2017–2023	Greenock Morton	24	(0)
2020–2021	→ Gretna 2008 (loan)	8	(0)
2023–	Clyde	77	(3)
- * Club domestic league appearances and goals as of 4 May 2026

Darren Hynes (born 12 January 1999) is a Scottish footballer, who plays as a defender for Scottish League Two club Clyde. He previously played for Greenock Morton, and has also played on loan for Gretna 2008.

== Club career ==
Hynes came through the Greenock Morton youth academy after signing from Aberdeen in 2015. He made his debut against Inverness Caledonian Thistle in May 2018.

In September 2020, Hynes was loaned out to Lowland League club Gretna 2008 until January 2021. Hynes left the club in January 2023 by mutual consent.

On 12 January 2023, Hynes signed an 18-month deal with Scottish League One club Clyde.

== Career statistics ==
As of 17 April 2021

Appearances and goals by club, season and competition
Club	Season	League			National Cup		League Cup		Other		Total	
Club	Season	Division	Apps	Goals	Apps	Goals	Apps	Goals	Apps	Goals	Apps	Goals
Greenock Morton	2017–18	Scottish Championship	1	0	0	0	0	0	0	0	1	0
Greenock Morton	2018–19	Scottish Championship	0	0	0	0	1	0	1 (Note: Appearance in the Scottish Challenge Cup)	0	2	0
Greenock Morton	2019–20	Scottish Championship	0	0	0	0	0	0	0	0	0	0
Greenock Morton	2020–21	Scottish Championship	3	0	2	0	0	0	0	0	5	0
Greenock Morton	Total		4	0	2	0	1	0	1	0	8	0
Gretna 2008 (loan)	2020–21	Lowland Football League	8	0	0	0	0	0	0	0	8	0
Career total			12	0	2	0	1	0	1	0	16	0

== Honours ==
- SPFL Development League West: Winners (2) 2015–16, 2017-18
