= 2019–20 Scottish League Cup =

Tournament details
- Country: Scotland
- Dates: 12 July – 8 December 2019
- Teams: 44

Final positions
- Champions: Celtic
- Runners-up: Rangers

Tournament statistics
- Matches played: 95
- Goals scored: 298 (3.14 per match)
- Top goal scorer(s): Florian Kamberi; Kevin Nisbet (5 goals)

The 2019–20 Scottish League Cup (also known as the Betfred Cup for sponsorship reasons) was the 74th season of Scotland's second-most prestigious football knockout competition.

The format for the 2019–20 competition was the same as the previous three seasons.

It began with eight groups of five teams which included all 2018–19 Scottish Professional Football League (SPFL) clubs, excluding those competing in Champions League and Europa League qualifiers, as well as the winners of the 2018–19 Highland Football League (Cove Rangers) and the 2018–19 Lowland Football League (East Kilbride).

== Schedule ==
Round	First match date	Fixtures	Clubs
Group stage	13 July 2019	80	44 → 16
Second round	16 August 2019	8	16 → 8
Quarter finals	24 September 2019	4	8 → 4
Semi finals	2 November 2019	2	4 → 2
Final	8 December 2019	1	2 → 1

== Format ==
The competition began with eight groups of five teams. The four clubs competing in the UEFA Champions League (Celtic) and Europa League (Rangers, Kilmarnock, and Aberdeen) qualifying rounds were given a bye through to the second round. The 40 teams competing in the group stage consisted of the other eight teams that competed in the 2018–19 Scottish Premiership, and all of the teams that competed in the 2018–19 Scottish Championship, 2018–19 Scottish League One and 2018–19 Scottish League Two, as well as the 2018–19 Highland Football League and the 2018–19 Lowland Football League champions.

The winners of each of the eight groups, as well as the four best runners-up progressed to the second round (last 16), which includes the four UEFA qualifying clubs. At this stage, the competition reverts to the traditional knock-out format. The four group winners with the highest points total and the clubs entering at this stage are seeded, with the four group winners with the lowest points unseeded along with the four best runners-up.

=== Bonus point system ===
In December 2015, the SPFL announced that alongside the new group stage format, a bonus point system would be introduced to provide greater excitement and increase the number of meaningful games at this stage. The traditional point system of awarding three points for a win and one point for a draw is used, however, for each group stage match that finishes in a draw, a penalty shoot-out takes place, with the winner being awarded a bonus point.

== Group stage ==
The group stage was made up of eight teams from the 2018–19 Scottish Premiership, and all ten teams from each of the 2018–19 Scottish Championship, 2018–19 Scottish League One and 2018–19 Scottish League Two, as well as the winners of the 2018–19 Highland Football League and 2018–19 Lowland Football League. The 40 teams were divided into two sections – North and South – with each section containing four top seeds, four second seeds and 12 unseeded teams. Each section was drawn into four groups with each group comprising one top seed, one second seed and three unseeded teams.

The draw for the group stage took place on 28 May 2019 and was broadcast live on the SPFL YouTube channel.

=== North ===
==== Group A ====
Pos	Team	Pld	W	PW	PL	L	GF	GA	GD	Pts	Qualification	HOM	EFI	DUN	STE	COW
1	Heart of Midlothian	4	2	1	1	0	6	3	+3	9	Qualification for the Second Round	—	—	p1–1	2–1	—
2	East Fife	4	2	1	0	1	5	3	+2	8	Qualification for the Second Round	p1–1	—	—	2–0	—
3	Dundee United	4	2	0	1	1	6	4	+2	7		—	0–2	—	—	3–0
4	Stenhousemuir	4	1	0	0	3	4	6	−2	3		—	—	1–2	—	2–0
5	Cowdenbeath	4	1	0	0	3	2	7	−5	3		0–2	2–0	—	—	—

Rules for classification: 1) goal difference, 2) goals scored, 3) away goals scored, 4) matches won, 5) away matches won, 6) drawing of lots.

==== Group B ====
Pos	Team	Pld	W	PW	PL	L	GF	GA	GD	Pts	Qualification	ROS	FOR	MON	STJ	BRE
1	Ross County	4	4	0	0	0	12	2	+10	12	Qualification for the Second Round	—	2–0	4–1	—	—
2	Forfar Athletic	4	3	0	0	1	9	4	+5	9	Qualification for the Second Round	—	—	—	2–1	3–0
3	Montrose	4	1	1	0	2	4	9	−5	5		—	1–4	—	1–0	—
4	St Johnstone	4	1	0	0	3	6	5	+1	3		1–2	—	—	—	4–0
5	Brechin City	4	0	0	1	3	1	12	−11	1		0–4	—	1–1p	—	—

Rules for classification: 1) goal difference, 2) goals scored, 3) away goals scored, 4) matches won, 5) away matches won, 6) drawing of lots.

==== Group C ====
Pos	Team	Pld	W	PW	PL	L	GF	GA	GD	Pts	Qualification	HIB	ALO	ARB	ELG	STI
1	Hibernian	4	3	1	0	0	8	1	+7	11	Qualification for the Second Round	—	2–0	3–0	—	—
2	Alloa Athletic	4	2	0	1	1	8	8	0	7		—	—	—	3–3p	2–1
3	Arbroath	4	2	0	0	2	10	8	+2	6		—	2–3	—	2–1	—
4	Elgin City	4	1	1	0	2	7	7	0	5		0–2	—	—	—	3–0
5	Stirling Albion	4	0	0	1	3	3	12	−9	1		1–1p	—	1–6	—	—

Rules for classification: 1) goal difference, 2) goals scored, 3) away goals scored, 4) matches won, 5) away matches won, 6) drawing of lots.

==== Group D ====
Pos	Team	Pld	W	PW	PL	L	GF	GA	GD	Pts	Qualification	DND	ICT	PET	COV	RAI
1	Dundee	4	2	2	0	0	4	0	+4	10	Qualification for the Second Round	—	1–0	p0–0	—	—
2	Inverness CT	4	2	0	1	1	7	4	+3	7		—	—	—	3–2	4–1
3	Peterhead	4	1	1	1	1	3	4	−1	6		—	p0–0	—	2–1	—
4	Cove Rangers	4	1	0	1	2	6	5	+1	4		0–0p	—	—	—	3–0
5	Raith Rovers	4	1	0	0	3	4	11	−7	3		0–3	—	3–1	—	—

Rules for classification: 1) goal difference, 2) goals scored, 3) away goals scored, 4) matches won, 5) away matches won, 6) drawing of lots.

=== South ===
==== Group E ====
Pos	Team	Pld	W	PW	PL	L	GF	GA	GD	Pts	Qualification	MOT	GMO	QOS	DUM	ANN
1	Motherwell	4	4	0	0	0	13	0	+13	12	Qualification for the Second Round	—	4–0	—	—	4–0
2	Greenock Morton	4	2	1	0	1	14	8	+6	8	Qualification for the Second Round	—	—	p3–3	6–1	—
3	Queen of the South	4	1	1	1	1	10	10	0	6		0–3	—	—	—	p3–3
4	Dumbarton	4	1	0	0	3	3	12	−9	3		0–2	—	1–4	—	—
5	Annan Athletic	4	0	0	1	3	3	13	−10	1		—	0–5	—	0–1	—

Rules for classification: 1) goal difference, 2) goals scored, 3) away goals scored, 4) matches won, 5) away matches won, 6) drawing of lots.

==== Group F ====
Pos	Team	Pld	W	PW	PL	L	GF	GA	GD	Pts	Qualification	PAR	HAM	AIR	QPA	CLY
1	Partick Thistle	4	3	0	1	0	8	5	+3	10	Qualification for the Second Round	—	—	1–0	—	3–2
2	Hamilton Academical	4	2	1	1	0	8	5	+3	9	Qualification for the Second Round	p2–2	—	—	0–0p	—
3	Airdrieonians	4	1	1	0	2	7	8	−1	5		—	2–3	—	p2–2	—
4	Queen's Park	4	0	2	1	1	4	5	−1	5		1–2	—	—	—	p1–1
5	Clyde	4	0	0	1	3	6	10	−4	1		—	1–3	2–3	—	—

Rules for classification: 1) goal difference, 2) goals scored, 3) away goals scored, 4) matches won, 5) away matches won, 6) drawing of lots.

==== Group G ====
Pos	Team	Pld	W	PW	PL	L	GF	GA	GD	Pts	Qualification	LIV	AYR	FAL	STR	BER
1	Livingston	4	3	1	0	0	10	3	+7	11	Qualification for the Second Round	—	2–1	—	—	5–0
2	Ayr United	4	2	0	1	1	12	5	+7	7		—	—	2–1	2–2p	—
3	Falkirk	4	2	0	1	1	6	3	+3	7		1–1p	—	—	1–0	—
4	Stranraer	4	1	1	0	2	9	5	+4	5		1–2	—	—	—	6–0
5	Berwick Rangers	4	0	0	0	4	0	21	−21	0		—	0–7	0–3	—	—

Rules for classification: 1) goal difference, 2) goals scored, 3) away goals scored, 4) matches won, 5) away matches won, 6) drawing of lots.

==== Group H ====
Pos	Team	Pld	W	PW	PL	L	GF	GA	GD	Pts	Qualification	DNF	ALB	STM	EKB	EDI
1	Dunfermline Athletic	4	3	0	0	1	13	3	+10	9	Qualification for the Second Round	—	6–0	—	4–0	—
2	Albion Rovers	4	2	0	1	1	3	7	−4	7		—	—	0–0p	—	2–1
3	St Mirren	4	1	1	1	1	3	3	0	6		2–3	—	—	—	1–0
4	East Kilbride	4	1	1	0	2	1	5	−4	5		—	0–1	p0–0	—	—
5	Edinburgh City	4	1	0	0	3	2	4	−2	3		1–0	—	—	0–1	—

Rules for classification: 1) goal difference, 2) goals scored, 3) away goals scored, 4) matches won, 5) away matches won, 6) drawing of lots.

=== Best runners-up ===
Pos	Grp	Team	Pld	W	PW	PL	L	GF	GA	GD	Pts	Qualification
1	B	Forfar Athletic	4	3	0	0	1	9	4	+5	9	Qualification for the Second Round
2	F	Hamilton Academical	4	2	1	1	0	8	5	+3	9	Qualification for the Second Round
3	E	Greenock Morton	4	2	1	0	1	14	8	+6	8	Qualification for the Second Round
4	A	East Fife	4	2	1	0	1	5	3	+2	8	Qualification for the Second Round
5	G	Ayr United	4	2	0	1	1	12	5	+7	7	
6	D	Inverness Caledonian Thistle	4	2	0	1	1	7	4	+3	7	
7	C	Alloa Athletic	4	2	0	1	1	8	8	0	7	
8	H	Albion Rovers	4	2	0	1	1	3	7	−4	7	

Rules for classification: 1) goal difference, 2) goals scored, 3) away goals scored, 4) matches won, 5) away matches won, 6) drawing of lots.

== Knockout phase ==
=== Second round ===
==== Draw and seeding ====
The draw for the second round took place on 28 July 2019 at the conclusion of the Dundee-Inverness Caledonian Thistle match. Aberdeen, Celtic, Kilmarnock and Rangers entered the competition at this stage, after receiving a bye for the group stage due to their participation in UEFA club competitions.

The four UEFA-qualifying clubs and the four group winners with the best record were seeded for the draw.

Teams in Bold advanced to the quarter-finals.

Seeded	Unseeded
**Aberdeen**; **Celtic**; **Hibernian**; **Kilmarnock**; **Livingston**; Motherwell; **Rangers**; Ross County	Dundee†; Dunfermline Athletic†; East Fife*; Forfar Athletic*; Greenock Morton†; Hamilton Academical; **Heart of Midlothian**; **Partick Thistle**†

Notes

- † denotes teams playing in the Championship.
- * denotes teams playing in League One.

==== Matches ====
16 August 2019	Motherwell	**1–2**	**Heart of Midlothian**	Motherwell
19:45	Long 60'		Smith 40'; Washington 45+2' (pen.)	Stadium: Fir Park; Attendance: 5,597; Referee: Bobby Madden

17 August 2019	**Hibernian**	**5–3** (a.e.t.)	Greenock Morton	Edinburgh
15:00	Allan 20'; Vela 32'; Kamberi 55', 104'; Doidge 120'		McHugh 39'; Stevenson 45' (o.g.); Whittaker 90+1' (o.g.)	Stadium: Easter Road; Attendance: 6,557; Referee: Alan Muir

17 August 2019	**Partick Thistle**	**3–2** (a.e.t.)	Ross County	Glasgow
15:00	Miller 80'; Penrice 96'; Saunders 114'		Spittal 60'; Paton 105'	Stadium: Firhill Stadium; Attendance: 2,053; Referee: Steven McLean

17 August 2019	**Celtic**	**2–1** (a.e.t.)	Dunfermline Athletic	Glasgow
15:00	Johnston 55'; Forrest 114'		Beadling 77'	Stadium: Celtic Park; Attendance: 27,318; Referee: John Beaton

17 August 2019	Forfar Athletic	**1–2**	**Livingston**	Forfar
15:00	Hilson 63'		Dykes 34'; Pittman 53'	Stadium: Station Park; Attendance: 884; Referee: Gavin Duncan

17 August 2019	**Kilmarnock**	**1–0** (a.e.t.)	Hamilton Academical	Kilmarnock
15:00	Thomas 113'			Stadium: Rugby Park; Attendance: 3,762; Referee: Kevin Clancy

18 August 2019	Dundee	**1–2** (a.e.t.)	**Aberdeen**	Dundee
15:00	Johnson 43'		Considine 90+1'; Cosgrove 103'	Stadium: Dens Park; Attendance: 5,740; Referee: Willie Collum

18 August 2019	East Fife	**0–3**	**Rangers**	Methil
15:00			Defoe 26'; Helander 56'; Aribo 84'	Stadium: Bayview Stadium; Attendance: 1,991; Referee: Don Robertson

=== Quarter-finals ===
==== Draw ====
Teams in Bold advanced to the semi-finals.

Premiership	Championship
Aberdeen; **Celtic**; **Heart of Midlothian**; **Hibernian**; Kilmarnock; Livingston; **Rangers**	Partick Thistle

==== Matches ====
25 September 2019	**Celtic**	**5–0**	Partick Thistle	Glasgow
19:45	Bayo 15'; Rogic 46'; Ntcham 56', 63'; Sinclair 76'			Stadium: Celtic Park; Attendance: 25,008; Referee: Steven McLean

25 September 2019	Kilmarnock	**0–0** (a.e.t.) (**4–5** p)	**Hibernian**	Kilmarnock
19:45				Stadium: Rugby Park; Attendance: 4,780; Referee: Willie Collum
	**Penalties**
	Sow (penalty scored); Thomas (penalty scored); Millar (penalty scored); O'Donnell (penalty missed); McKenzie (penalty scored); Hämäläinen (penalty missed)		(penalty scored) Allan; (penalty missed) Shaw; (penalty scored) Mallan; (penalty scored) Hanlon; (penalty scored) Tom James; (penalty scored) Newell

25 September 2019	**Heart of Midlothian**	**2–2** (a.e.t.) (**3–0** p)	Aberdeen	Edinburgh
19:45	MacLean 22'; Halkett 90'		Cosgrove 12' (pen.), 31' (pen.)	Stadium: Tynecastle Park; Attendance: 12,866; Referee: Kevin Clancy
	**Penalties**
	Whelan (penalty scored); Smith (penalty scored); Keena (penalty scored)		(penalty missed) Cosgrove; (penalty missed) McGinn; (penalty missed) Anderson

25 September 2019	Livingston	**0–1**	**Rangers**	Livingston
19:45			Kamara 5'	Stadium: Almondvale Stadium; Attendance: 8,160; Referee: Don Robertson

=== Semi-finals ===
==== Draw ====
Teams in Bold advanced to the final.

Teams in Italics were not known at the time of the draw.

Teams Involved
- **Celtic**
- Heart of Midlothian
- Hibernian
- **Rangers**

==== Matches ====
2 November 2019	Hibernian	**2–5**	**Celtic**	Glasgow
17:30	Hallberg 36'; Kamberi 58'		Elyounoussi 17', 44'; McGregor 21'; Brown 56', 90'	Stadium: Hampden Park; Attendance: 46,782; Referee: Bobby Madden

3 November 2019	**Rangers**	**3–0**	Heart of Midlothian	Glasgow
15:00	Helander 45+1'; Morelos 47', 62'			Stadium: Hampden Park; Attendance: 49,310; Referee: John Beaton

== Final ==
8 December 2019	Rangers	0–1	Celtic	Glasgow
15:00			Jullien 60'	Stadium: Hampden Park; Attendance: 51,117; Referee: Willie Collum

== Media coverage ==
The domestic broadcasting rights for the competition are held exclusively by BT Sport.

The following matches were broadcast live on UK television:

Round	Date	Match
Group Stage	12 July 2019	Heart of Midlothian v Dundee United
Group Stage	14 July 2019	St Mirren v Dunfermline Athletic
Group Stage	19 July 2019	Motherwell v Greenock Morton
Group Stage	21 July 2019	St Johnstone v Ross County
Group Stage	26 July 2019	Elgin City v Hibernian
Group Stage	28 July 2019	Dundee v Inverness Caledonian Thistle
Second Round	16 August 2019	Motherwell v Heart of Midlothian
Second Round	18 August 2019	East Fife v Rangers
Quarter-finals	25 September 2019	Livingston v Rangers
Semi-finals	2 November 2019	Hibernian v Celtic
Semi-finals	3 November 2019	Rangers v Heart of Midlothian
Final	8 December 2019	Rangers v Celtic
