= Ben Eardley =

Scottish footballer

Personal information
- Full name: Ben Peter Eardley
- Date of birth: 29 December 1999 (age 26)
- Place of birth: Greenock, Scotland
- Positions: Midfielder; left back

Team information
- Current team: St Cadoc's
- Number: 38

Youth career
- St Andrews BC
- Port Glasgow
- 2012–2018: Greenock Morton

Senior career*
Years	Team	Apps	(Gls)
2018–2020	Greenock Morton	1	(0)
2017–2018	→ Greenock Juniors (loan)		
2019–2020	→ Largs Thistle (loan)		
2020–2022	Greenock Juniors		
2022–	St Cadoc's		
- * Club domestic league appearances and goals as of 12 January 2019

Ben Eardley (born 29 December 1999) is a Scottish footballer who plays for St Cadoc's.

== Club career ==
Eardley came through the Greenock Morton youth academy to become part of the successful under-20 side.

In August 2017, Eardley went out on a development loan to local Junior club Greenock Juniors.

He made his debut as a late substitute at Cappielow against Inverness Caledonian Thistle in April 2018. At the end of that season, Eardley signed a further one-year contract until 10 June 2019.

== International career ==
In November 2012, Eardley was called up to the SFA's regional performance squad.

== Personal life ==
Eardley attended St Kenneth's Primary School and Notre Dame High Schools in Greenock.

== Honours ==
- SPFL Development League West: Winners (2) 2015-16, 2017-18
