= Jack Purdue =

Scottish footballer (born 1999)

Personal information
- Date of birth: 20 November 1999 (age 26)
- Place of birth: Greenock, Scotland
- Position: Attacking midfielder

Youth career
- Gourock YAC
- 2014–2018: Greenock Morton

Senior career*
Years	Team	Apps	(Gls)
2018–2019	Greenock Morton	178	
2019–2020	Queen's Park	14	(6)
2020	→ East Stirlingshire (loan)	300	(1)
2020–2022	Annan Athletic	58	(1)
- * Club domestic league appearances and goals as of 00:54, 26 January 2022 (UTC)

Jack Purdue (born 20 November 1999) is a Scottish professional footballer who plays as an attacking midfielder.

== Career ==
=== Greenock Morton ===
Purdue joined Greenock Morton's Youth Academy from Gourock YAC in November 2014, and he made his development team breakthrough in September 2015. He signed a full-time contract in May 2016 to tie him to Morton until summer 2018. He made his professional debut as substitute on 24 February 2018 away to Inverness Caledonian Thistle F.C. in a 2-0 Morton win. In May 2018, Purdue signed on for a further season at Morton after scoring the winning penalty to secure the Development League West title for 2017–18. He was released by Morton in May 2019.

=== Queen's Park ===
Purdue signed for Queen's Park in July 2019. He made his debut for Queen's in a 0–0 draw v Hamilton Academical on 13 July 2019 in the League Cup.

Purdue scored his first senior goal in a 2–2 draw with Airdrieonians on 24 July 2019 in the League Cup. In a season of firsts Purdue also scored his first league goal, in a 2–1 win v Edinburgh City on 30 November 2019 in Scottish League Two. He signed for East Stirlingshire on loan on 21 February 2020 until the end of the season, which was curtailed by the COVID-19 pandemic.

=== Annan Athletic ===
Annan Athletic announced the signing of Purdue on 3 October 2020. On 25 January 2022, Purdue was released from his contract.

== Career statistics ==
As of match played 1 February 2020

Appearances and goals by club, season and competition
Club	Season	League			Scottish Cup		League Cup		Other		Total	
Club	Season	Division	Apps	Goals	Apps	Goals	Apps	Goals	Apps	Goals	Apps	Goals
Greenock Morton	2017–18	Scottish Championship	1	0	0	0	0	0	0	0	1	0
Greenock Morton	2018–19	Scottish Championship	0	0	1	0	1	0	0	0	2	0
Greenock Morton	Total		1	0	1	0	1	0	0	0	3	0
Queen's Park	2019–20	Scottish League Two	14	1	1	0	4	1	1 (Note: Appearance(s) in the Scottish Challenge Cup)	0	20	2
Career total			15	1	2	0	5	1	1	0	23	2

== Honours ==
Morton

- SPFL Development League West: (2) 2015–16, 2017–18.
