= Connor McManus =

Scottish footballer

Personal information
- Date of birth: 29 February 1996 (age 30)
- Place of birth: Paisley, Scotland
- Position: Midfielder

Team information
- Current team: Kelty Hearts
- Number: 8

Youth career
- 2005–2015: Celtic

Senior career*
Years	Team	Apps	(Gls)
2015–2017	Celtic	1	(0)
2015–2016	→ Alloa Athletic (loan)	37	(1)
2017	→ Queen of the South (loan)	8	(0)
2017–2018	Greenock Morton	10	(0)
2018	→ East Fife (loan)	18	(1)
2018–2021	Stranraer	105	(3)
2021–2026	East Fife	185	(10)
2026–	Kelty Hearts	6	(0)
- * Club domestic league appearances and goals as of 20:58, 19 October 2026

Connor McManus (born 29 February 1996) is a Scottish footballer who plays as a midfielder for Scottish League Two club Kelty Hearts. McManus has previously played for Celtic, Alloa Athletic, Queen of the South, Greenock Morton, East Fife and Stranraer.

== Career ==
McManus joined Celtic's academy in 2005. McManus played for the team in the 2013–14 UEFA Youth League and scored versus A.C. Milan on 26 November 2013 but the club was still eliminated from the competition. In 2015, McManus won the Scottish Youth Cup, captaining the team to a 5–2 win over Old Firm rivals Rangers at Hampden Park.

On 3 July 2015 McManus and teammate Michael Duffy were loaned out to Alloa Athletic. McManus made his senior debut twenty two days later, playing the full 90 minutes in a 1–0 win at Brora Rangers in the first round of the Scottish Challenge Cup and on 8 August 2015 McManus made his league debut in a 3–1 defeat away to Queen of the South at Palmerston Park in Dumfries. McManus scored one goal in a 2-2 draw versus the Doonhamers, as the Wasps were relegated to Scottish League One.

On 24 March 2017, McManus signed an emergency loan deal at Queen of the South and returned to Celtic at the end of the 2016-17 season. After he was released by Celtic, McManus signed a six-month contract with Greenock Morton in July 2017.

After Greenock Morton, Connor moved onto East Fife on loan making only 11 appearances and 1 goal then following season signed for Stranraer for two seasons in Scottish League Two.

In August 2021 he moved back permanently with East Fife but hugely missed most of 2021-2022 season with injury where the club was relegated to league two in the end. Therefore made a comeback in the 1-0 away win over Albion Rovers on 11 February 2023.

On 1 July 2026, McManus joined Scottish League Two side Kelty Hearts.
