= 2024–25 PFC Slavia Sofia season =

PFC Slavia Sofia
2024–25 season
- Owner: Mladen Mihalev
- Chairman: Ventsislav Stefanov
- Manager: Zlatomir Zagorčić
- Stadium: Stadion Aleksandar Shalamanov
- First Professional Football League: 9th
- Bulgarian Cup: Round of 32
Home colours	Away colours

The 2024–25 season is the 112th season in the history of PFC Slavia Sofia, and the club's 67th consecutive season in the First Professional Football League. In addition to the domestic league, the team is scheduled to participate in the Bulgarian Cup and the UEFA Conference League.

== Competitions ==
=== Overall record ===
Competition	First match	Last match	Starting round	Final position	Record							
Competition	First match	Last match	Starting round	Final position	Pld	W	D	L	GF	GA	GD	Win %
First Professional Football League	19 July 2024		Matchday 1		29	11	6	12	42	42	+0	37.93
Bulgarian Cup	29 October 2024	14 December 2024	Round of 32	Round of 16	2	1	0	1	3	2	+1	50.00
Total					31	12	6	13	45	44	+1	38.71

Source: Soccerway

=== First Professional Football League ===
==== League table ====
Pos	Team	Pld	W	D	L	GF	GA	GD	Pts	Qualification
7	CSKA Sofia	30	13	8	9	40	27	+13	47	Qualification for the Conference League group
8	Beroe	30	12	6	12	34	29	+5	42 (Note: Head-to-head away goals: Beroe 1; Slavia Sofia 0.)	Qualification for the Conference League group
9	Slavia Sofia	30	12	6	12	43	42	+1	42	Qualification for the Relegation group
10	CSKA 1948	30	8	10	12	38	44	−6	34	Qualification for the Relegation group
11	Septemvri Sofia	30	10	3	17	32	47	−15	33	Qualification for the Relegation group

Source: soccerway, Bulgarian Football
Rules for classification: 1) Points; 2) Head-to-head points; 3) Head-to-head goal difference; 4) Head-to-head goals scored; 5) Head-to-head away goals scored (only if two teams); 6) Goal difference; 7) Goals scored; 8) Fairplay ranking; 9) Draw
Notes:

Pos	Team	Pld	W	D	L	GF	GA	GD	Pts	Qualification	LUD	LEV	CHM	ARD
1	Ludogorets Razgrad (C)	36	25	8	3	70	22	+48	83	Qualification for the Champions League first qualifying round	—	1–1	2–0	2–2
2	Levski Sofia	36	21	9	6	64	29	+35	72	Qualification for the Europa League first qualifying round (Note: As Ludogorets Razgrad won the 2024–25 Bulgarian Cup, the cup's Europa League first qualifying round berth was passed to the second-placed team in the First League.)	2–2	—	2–0	1–1
3	Cherno More	36	15	14	7	44	30	+14	59	Qualification for the Conference League second qualifying round	2–0	0–0	—	1–1
4	Arda (O)	36	15	13	8	54	41	+13	58	Qualification for the Conference League play-off	1–1	0–3	0–0	—

Source: soccerway, Bulgarian Football
Legend: Blue = home team win; Yellow = draw; Red = away team win.
Rules for classification: 1) Points; 2) Head-to-head points; 3) Head-to-head goal difference; 4) Head-to-head goals scored; 5) Head-to-head away goals scored (only if two teams); 6) Goal difference; 7) Goals scored; 8) Fairplay ranking; 9) Draw
(C) Champions; (O) Play-off winners
Notes:

Pos	Team	Pld	W	D	L	GF	GA	GD	Pts	Qualification	CSS	BPD	SPV	BER
1	CSKA Sofia	36	19	8	9	58	28	+30	65	Qualification for the Conference League play-off	—	3–0	5–0	2–1
2	Botev Plovdiv	36	16	8	12	43	43	0	56		0–4	—	3–2	1–1
3	Spartak Varna	36	15	6	15	45	53	−8	51		0–1	2–1	—	1–2
4	Beroe	36	14	7	15	41	43	−2	49		0–3	0–6	3–1	—

Source: soccerway, Bulgarian Football
Legend: Blue = home team win; Yellow = draw; Red = away team win.
Rules for classification: 1) Points; 2) Head-to-head points; 3) Head-to-head goal difference; 4) Head-to-head goals scored; 5) Head-to-head away goals scored (only if two teams); 6) Goal difference; 7) Goals scored; 8) Fairplay ranking; 9) Draw

Pos	Team	Pld	W	D	L	GF	GA	GD	Pts	Qualification or relegation	SLA	LSO	CSK	SEP	LPD	BVR	KRU	HEB
1	Slavia Sofia	37	14	7	16	50	52	−2	49		—	0–0	0–1	—	1–2	—	—	3–2
2	Lokomotiv Sofia	37	13	8	16	43	51	−8	47 (Note: Head-to-head points: Lokomotiv Sofia 4; CSKA 1948 1.)		—	—	2–1	—	—	3–0	3–0	3–0
3	CSKA 1948	37	12	11	14	45	47	−2	47		—	—	—	2–0	—	0–1	2–0	0–0
4	Septemvri Sofia	37	14	3	20	42	56	−14	45		3–1	0–2	—	—	2–0	—	—	1–0
5	Lokomotiv Plovdiv (O)	37	10	8	19	37	49	−12	38	Qualification for the relegation play-off	—	1–1	0–1	—	—	1–3	—	—
6	Botev Vratsa (O)	37	10	6	21	34	65	−31	36	Qualification for the relegation play-off	2–1	—	—	3–2	—	—	1–0	—
7	Krumovgrad (R)	37	8	9	20	20	45	−25	33	Relegation to the Second League	0–1	—	—	1–2	0–4	—	—	—
8	Hebar (R)	37	4	9	24	28	64	−36	21	Relegation to the Second League	—	—	—	—	1–2	1–0	1–3	—

Source: Soccerway, Bulgarian Football
Legend: Blue = home team win; Yellow = draw; Red = away team win.
Rules for classification: 1) Points; 2) Head-to-head points (only in regular season); 3) Head-to-head goal difference (only in regular season); 4) Head-to-head goals scored (only in regular season); 5) Head-to-head away goals scored (only if two teams and only in regular season); 6) Goal difference; 7) Goals scored; 8) Fairplay ranking; 9) Draw
(O) Play-off winners; (R) Relegated

==== Results summary ====
Overall								Home						Away					
Pld	W	D	L	GF	GA	GD	Pts	W	D	L	GF	GA	GD	W	D	L	GF	GA	GD
29	11	6	12	42	42	0	39	9	2	4	26	19	+7	2	4	8	16	23	−7

==== Results by round ====
Round	1
Ground	H
Result	
Position	

A = Away; H = Home; W = Win; D = Draw; L = Loss

==== Matches ====
The match schedule was released on 13 June 2024.

19 July 2024 1	Krumovgrad	1–0	Slavia Sofia	Plovdiv
21:15 UTC+3	Katsarov 11' (red card) 65'; Šimić (yellow card) 76'	Report	Jelenković (yellow card) 22'; Ivanov (yellow card) 59'; Kristiyan Stoyanov (yellow card) 63'; Chunchukov (yellow card) 78'; Martinov (yellow card) 87' (yellow-red card) 90+4'; Minchev (yellow card) 90+1'	Stadium: Nikola Shterev-Starika Complex; Attendance: 890; Referee: (Bulgaria) Georgi Davidov

2 August 2024 3	Hebar	1–1	Slavia Sofia	Sofia
19:00 EEST	Makni 49'; Zbun (yellow card) 79'; Kaloyan Pehlivanov (yellow card) 80'; Krastev (yellow card) 90+2'	Report	Genev 5' (yellow card) 90+2'; Minchev (yellow card) 54'	Stadium: Stadion Aleksandar Shalamanov; Attendance: 890; Referee: (Bulgaria) Dragomir Draganov

9 August 2024 4	Slavia Sofia	3–1	Spartak Varna	Sofia
19:00 EEST	Fabien 10'; Aleksandrov 45+1'; Nikolov 49'; Do (yellow card) 60'; Genev (yellow card) 87'	Report	Ahmedov 34'; Ivey (yellow card) 71'; Rivollier (yellow card) 74'; Dimitrov (yellow card) 79'; Daniel Ivanov (yellow card) 86'	Stadium: Stadion Aleksandar Shalamanov; Attendance: 230; Referee: (Bulgaria) Nikola Popov

17 August 2024 5	CSKA Sofia	0–1	Slavia Sofia	Sofia
19:00 EEST	Phaëton (yellow card) 45+2'	Report	Minchev 13' (pen.); Jelenković (yellow card) 14'; Chunchukov (yellow card) 64'; Georgiev (yellow card) 70'	Stadium: Vasil Levski National Stadium; Attendance: 400; Referee: (Bulgaria) Volen Chinkov

25 August 2024 6	CSKA 1948	2–0	Slavia Sofia	Bistritsa, Sofia
19:00 EEST	Umarbayev (yellow card) 21'; Thalis 24'; Serdyuk 52'; Mario Ivov (yellow card) 86'	Report	Jelenković (yellow card) 14'; Kristiyan Stoyanov (yellow card) 74'	Stadium: Stadion Bistritsa; Attendance: 15; Referee: (Bulgaria) Georgi Kabakov

30 August 2024 7	Slavia Sofia	1–1	Arda	Sofia
17:00 EEST	Minchev 79' (pen.); Genev (yellow card) 80'	Report	Ivanov 2'; Offor (yellow card) 75'	Stadium: Stadion Aleksandar Shalamanov; Attendance: 150; Referee: (Bulgaria) Dimitar Dimitrov

14 September 2024 12	Septemvri Sofia	3–2	Slavia Sofia	Sofia
17:30 EEST	Morán (yellow card) 23'; Gutiérrez 38'; Rupanov (yellow card) 46' (goal) 58' 69'; Ellé (yellow card) 80'; Varbanov (yellow card) 83'; Sheytanov (yellow card) 90+7'	Report	Chunchukov 64'; Ivanov (yellow card) 82'; Genev 85'; Kristiyan Stoyanov (yellow card) 90'	Stadium: Stadion Lokomotiv; Attendance: 350; Referee: (Bulgaria) Georgi Ginchev

18 September 2024 2	Slavia Sofia	0–1	Ludogorets	Sofia
17:30 EEST	Minchev (yellow card) 22'; Genev (yellow card) 54'; Lyubomir Kostov (yellow card) 82'; Kerchev (yellow card) 90+4'	Report	Rick 32'; Duarte (yellow card) 62'	Stadium: Stadion Aleksandar Shalamanov; Attendance: 820; Referee: (Bulgaria) Volen Chinkov

22 September 2024 9	Slavia Sofia	0–1	Levski Sofia	Sofia
17:30 EEST		Report	Dimitrov 45+5' (yellow card) 81'; Sangaré (yellow card) 66'; Makoun (yellow card) 78'; Kolev (yellow card) 90+4'	Stadium: Stadion Aleksandar Shalamanov; Attendance: 5,500; Referee: (Bulgaria) Georgi Ginchev

27 September 2024 10	Beroe	1–0	Slavia Sofia	Stara Zagora
20:00 EEST	Thiago Dylan Ceijas (yellow card) 24'; Luciano Gastón Squadrone (yellow card) 42'; Godoy (yellow card) 52' (goal) 90+1'; Segundo Pachamé (yellow card) 61'	Report	Kerchev (yellow card) 26'; Fabien (yellow card) 42'; Chunchukov (yellow card) 89'	Stadium: Stadion Beroe; Attendance: 1,948; Referee: (Bulgaria) Kristiyan Kolev

4 October 2024 11	Slavia Sofia	1–0	Cherno More	Sofia
20:00 EET	Kerchev (yellow card) 29'; Do (yellow card) 52'; Georgiev (yellow card) 63'; Fabien 77'; Kristiyan Stoyanov (yellow card) 81'; Ivanov (yellow card) 89'; Seedorf (yellow card) 90+3'	Report	Isa (yellow card) 48'; Weslen Júnior (yellow card) 82'; Soula (yellow card) 88'	Stadium: Stadion Aleksandar Shalamanov; Attendance: 910; Referee: (Bulgaria) Valentin Zhelezov

19 October 2024 8	Botev Plovdiv	1–0	Slavia Sofia	Plovdiv
18:45 EET	Minkov 17'	Report	Do (yellow card) 58'	Stadium: Stadion Hristo Botev; Attendance: 5,897; Referee: (Bulgaria) Georgi Ginchev

24 October 2024 13	Slavia Sofia	3–2	Lokomotiv Sofia	Sofia
15:00 EET	Seedorf 9'; Minchev 16' (pen.); Ivanov (yellow card) 45+2'; Nikolov 45+4'; Kristiyan Balov (yellow card) 64'; Kristiyan Stoyanov (yellow card) 90+2'	Report	Atska (yellow card) 32'; Aralica 37' (yellow card) 45+4' (goal) 63'; Athanasios Pitsolis (yellow card) 82'	Stadium: Stadion Aleksandar Shalamanov; Attendance: 999; Referee: (Bulgaria) Vladimir Valkov

=== Bulgarian Cup ===
29 October 2024 Round of 32	Montana	1-3	Slavia Sofia	Montana
17:00	Philip Chinemerem Ejike 88'	Report	Fabien 62' 70'; Jelenković 82'	Stadium: Stadion Ogosta; Referee: (Bulgaria) Dragomir Draganov
