= 2019–20 Motherwell F.C. season =

Motherwell
2019–20 season
- Chairman: James McMahon
- Manager: Stephen Robinson
- Stadium: Fir Park
- Scottish Premiership: 3rd
- Scottish Cup: Fifth round vs St Mirren
- League Cup: Second round vs Heart of Midlothian
- Top goalscorer: League: Liam Donnelly; Chris Long (7 each); All: Liam Donnelly; Chris Long (11 each)
- Highest home attendance: 8,822 vs Celtic (10 August 2019)
- Lowest home attendance: 2,763 vs Annan Athletic (27 July 2019)
- Average home league attendance: 5,246 (4 March 2020)
Home colours	Away colours

The 2019–20 season was Motherwell's thirty-fifth consecutive season in the top flight of Scottish football, having been promoted from the Scottish First Division at the end of the 1984–85 season. After the season was postponed on 13 March by the Scottish Football Association due to the COVID-19 pandemic, the season was curtailed on 18 May by the Scottish Professional Football League, with Motherwell finishing the season in third place with a points per game ration of 1.5333, 0.0333 higher than fourth placed Aberdeen. In the League Cup, Motherwell were knocked out by Heart of Midlothian in the Second Round, whilst St Mirren knocked Motherwell out of the Scottish Cup by penalties in a Fifth Round Reply.

== Season review ==
=== Pre-season ===
On 10 June, Motherwell announced the singing of Chris Long to a one-year contract, beginning when his Blackpool expires on 30 June. On 12 June, Motherwell announced that they had agreed a record transfer fee with Celtic for the transfer of midfielder David Turnbull, with the player given permission to discuss personal terms with Celtic. On 27 June Motherwell announced that the transfer had fallen through during the medical, with Turnbull requiring preventive surgery on his knee. On 2 July, Motherwell announced the signing of Devante Cole on an initial six-month loan deal from Wigan Athletic. On 8 July, Motherwell signed Sherwin Seedorf to a two-year contract from Wolverhampton Wanderers. On 12 July, Motherwell announced the signing of Christian Ilić to a one-year contract.

=== July ===
On 18 July, manager Stephen Robinson and assistant manager Keith Lasley both agreed new contracts, keeping them at the club until the summer of 2022. The following day, Rohan Ferguson moved to Linfield for the 2019/20 season.

On 23 July, Allan Campbell signed an improved contract with Motherwell until the summer of 2021. On 25 July, Motherwell announced the singing of Christy Manzinga on a one-year contract, with the option of a second, from Sporting Châtelet. The following day, 26 July, Danny Johnson moved to Dundee for an undisclosed fee, and Reece McAlear moved to Norwich City for an undisclosed.

On 2 September, Adam Livingstone joined Greenock Morton on a season-long loan deal, Craig Tanner declined a new contract from Motherwell and left the club, and Mark O'Hara joined on a season-long loan deal from Peterborough United.

=== September ===
On 12 September, Motherwell announced the signing of Bevis Mugabi on a contract until January 2020.

On 20 September, Motherwell announced that P. J. Morrison had joined Cowdenbeath on an emergency one-week loan deal.

=== October ===
On 2 October, Motherwell announced that they had extended their contract with Liam Donnelly until the summer of 2022.

=== November ===
On 22 November, Motherwell announced that they had extended their contract with Bevis Mugabi until the summer of 2021.

=== January ===
On 7 January, Motherwell announced that Trevor Carson had signed a new contract with the club, until the summer of 2022. On 13 January, Mikael Ndjoli joined Motherwell on loan from AFC Bournemouth for the remainder of the season.

On 15 January, Liam Grimshaw signed a new contract with Motherwell until the summer of 2022.

On 23 January, David Devine joined Queen of the South on loan for the remainder of the season.

On 28 January, Ross Maciver signed a new contract with Motherwell, keeping him at the club until the summer of 2021.

On 31 January, Casper Sloth left Motherwell by mutual consent, Rolando Aarons joined the club on loan from Newcastle United for the remainder of the season, and James Scott moved to Hull City for an undisclosed fee.

=== February ===
After returning to the club from his loan deal with Greenock Morton on 31 January, Adam Livingstone joined Clyde on loan for the remainder of the season on 4 February.

On 7 February, Motherwell announced the signing of Tony Watt on a contract until the end of the season.

=== March ===
On 9 March, Motherwell announced the signing of Harry Robinson on a contract until the end of the season.

On 11 March, David Turnbull signed a one-year extension to his contract, keeping him at Motherwell until the summer of 2022.

On 13 March, the Scottish Football Association postponed all league fixtures until further notice due to the COVID-19 pandemic.

=== May ===
On 18 May the season was curtailed by the Scottish Professional Football League with Motherwell finishing the season in third place with a points per game ration of 1.5333, 0.0333 higher than fourth placed Aberdeen.

On 29 May, Motherwell announced that Tony Watt had signed a new contract with the club, for the 2020–21 season.

On 31 May, Motherwell announced that Rohan Ferguson, Mark Gillespie, Richard Tait, Peter Hartley, Christian Ilić, Adam Livingstone and Christy Manzinga were all leaving the club after their contracts expired, whilst Charles Dunne, Chris Long, Barry Maguire, P. J. Morrison, Harry Robinson and Yusuf Hussain have been offered new contracts with contracts due to expire too.

== Transfers ==
=== In ===
Date	Position	Nationality	Name	From	Fee	Ref.
11 April 2019†	DF	(Scotland)	Declan Gallagher	Livingston	Free	
17 April 2019†	MF	(Scotland)	Liam Polworth	Inverness Caledonian Thistle	Free	
29 April 2019††	DF	(Republic of Ireland)	Jake Carroll	Cambridge United	Free	
21 May 2019††	MF	(Denmark)	Casper Sloth	Silkeborg	Free	
29 May 2019††	MF	(England)	Jermaine Hylton	Solihull Moors	Free	
10 June 2019††	FW	(England)	Chris Long	Blackpool	Free	
8 July 2019	MF	(Suriname)	Sherwin Seedorf	Wolverhampton Wanderers	Undisclosed	
12 July 2019	MF	(Croatia)	Christian Ilić	TSV Hartberg	Undisclosed	
25 July 2019	FW	(Democratic Republic of the Congo)	Christy Manzinga	Sporting Châtelet	Undisclosed	
1 August 2019	FW	(Scotland)	Ross Maciver	Ross County	Undisclosed	
12 September 2019	DF	(Uganda)	Bevis Mugabi	Yeovil Town	Free	
7 February 2020	FW	(Scotland)	Tony Watt	CSKA Sofia	Free	
9 March 2020	MF	(Northern Ireland)	Harry Robinson	Oldham Athletic	Free	

† Transfers announced on the above date, becoming official when the Scottish transfer window opened on 1 June.
†† Transfers announced on the above date, becoming official when they're contracts expire on 30 June.

=== Out ===
Date	Position	Nationality	Name	To	Fee	Ref.
26 July 2019	FW	(England)	Danny Johnson	Dundee	Undisclosed	
26 July 2019	MF	(Scotland)	Reece McAlear	Norwich City	Undisclosed	
31 January 2020	FW	(Scotland)	James Scott	Hull City	Undisclosed	

=== Loans in ===
Date from	Position	Nationality	Name	From	Date to	Ref.
2 July 2019	FW	(England)	Devante Cole	Wigan Athletic	1 January 2020	
2 September 2019	MF	(Scotland)	Mark O'Hara	Peterborough United	End of Season	
13 January 2020	FW	(England)	Mikael Ndjoli	AFC Bournemouth	End of Season	
31 January 2020	FW	(England)	Rolando Aarons	Newcastle United	End of Season	

=== Loans out ===
Date from	Position	Nationality	Name	To	Date to	Ref.
19 July 2019	GK	(Scotland)	Rohan Ferguson	Linfield	End of Season	
2 September 2019	DF	(Scotland)	Adam Livingstone	Greenock Morton	31 January 2019	
20 September 2019	GK	(Scotland)	P. J. Morrison	Cowdenbeath	27 September 2019	
23 January 2020	DF	(Scotland)	David Devine	Queen of the South	End of Season	
4 February 2020	DF	(Scotland)	Adam Livingstone	Clyde	End of Season	

=== Released ===
Date	Position	Nationality	Name	Joined	Date	Ref.
2 September 2019	FW	(England)	Craig Tanner	Aldershot Town	9 December 2019	
31 January 2020	MF	(Denmark)	Casper Sloth	Notts County	20 August 2020	
31 May 2020	GK	(England)	Mark Gillespie	Newcastle United	3 July 2020	
31 May 2020	GK	(Scotland)	Rohan Ferguson	Queen of the South	17 September 2020	
31 May 2020	DF	(England)	Peter Hartley	Jamshedpur	20 August 2020	
31 May 2020	DF	(England)	Richard Tait	St Mirren	18 June 2020	
31 May 2020	DF	(Republic of Ireland)	Charles Dunne	Motherwell	27 June 2020	
31 May 2020	DF	(Scotland)	Jack Brown	Albion Rovers	18 June 2020	
31 May 2020	DF	(Scotland)	Adam Livingstone	Cove Rangers	27 August 2020	
31 May 2020	MF	(Croatia)	Christian Ilić	Lokomotiv Plovdiv	21 August 2020	
31 May 2020	FW	(Democratic Republic of the Congo)	Christy Manzinga	Linfield	1 August 2020	
31 May 2020	FW	(England)	Chris Long	Motherwell	10 July 2020	
30 June 2020	GK	(Scotland)	Robbie Hemfrey	Stoke City U23	6 October 2020	
30 June 2020	MF	(Scotland)	Adam Kettings	Syngenta		
30 June 2020	FW	(Scotland)	Cole Starrs	Forfar Athletic	1 September 2020	

== Squad ==
As of match played 7 March 2020

No.	Name	Nationality	Position	Date of birth (age)	Signed from	Signed in	Contract ends	Apps.	Goals
Goalkeepers
1	Trevor Carson	(Northern Ireland)	GK	5 March 1988 (aged 32)	Hartlepool United	2017	2022	63	0
20	Mark Gillespie	(England)	GK	27 March 1992 (aged 28)	Walsall	2018	2020	67	0
41	Robbie Hemfrey	(Scotland)	GK	21 February 2002 (aged 18)	Academy	2012	2020	0	0
43	Matty Connelly	(Scotland)	GK	2 March 2003 (aged 17)	Academy	2019	2021	0	0
Defenders
2	Richard Tait	(Scotland)	DF	24 March 1989 (aged 31)	Grimsby Town	2016	2020	142	5
3	Jake Carroll	(Republic of Ireland)	DF	11 August 1991 (aged 28)	Cambridge United	2019	2021	27	2
5	Peter Hartley	(England)	DF	3 April 1988 (aged 32)	Blackpool	2018	2020	65	7
15	Barry Maguire	(Scotland)	DF	27 April 1998 (aged 22)	Academy	2015	2020	14	0
18	Charles Dunne	(Republic of Ireland)	DF	13 February 1993 (aged 27)	Oldham Athletic	2017	2020	78	1
22	Liam Donnelly	(Northern Ireland)	DF	7 March 1996 (aged 24)	Hartlepool United	2018	2022	40	12
24	Bevis Mugabi	(Uganda)	DF	1 May 1995 (aged 25)	Yeovil Town	2019	2021	11	0
31	Declan Gallagher	(Scotland)	DF	13 February 1991 (aged 29)	Livingston	2019	2021	36	2
32	Yusuf Hussain	(Scotland)	DF	26 April 2001 (aged 19)	Falkirk	2018	2020	0	0
34	Jack Brown	(Scotland)	DF	2 July 2002 (aged 17)	Academy	2014	2020	0	0
35	Sam Muir	(Scotland)	DF	10 July 2002 (aged 17)	Academy	2019	2021	0	0
36	Matthew McDonald	(Scotland)	DF	26 August 2002 (aged 17)	Academy	2019	2021	0	0
38	Cameron Wilson	(Scotland)	DF	20 May 2003 (age 23)	Academy	2019	2021	0	0
Midfielders
4	Liam Grimshaw	(England)	MF	2 February 1995 (aged 25)	Preston North End	2017	2022	102	0
6	Allan Campbell	(Scotland)	MF	4 July 1998 (aged 21)	Academy	2016	2021	120	11
7	David Turnbull	(Scotland)	MF	10 July 1999 (aged 20)	Academy	2017	2022	36	15
11	Sherwin Seedorf	(Suriname)	MF	17 March 1998 (aged 22)	Wolverhampton Wanderers	2019	2021	28	3
16	Christian Ilić	(Croatia)	MF	22 July 1996 (aged 23)	TSV Hartberg	2019	2020	13	1
19	Liam Polworth	(Scotland)	MF	12 October 1994 (aged 25)	Inverness Caledonian Thistle	2019	2021	37	3
26	Dean Cornelius	(Scotland)	MF	11 April 2001 (aged 19)	Hibernian	2018	2021	1	0
33	Adam Kettings	(Scotland)	MF	18 March 2002 (aged 18)	Academy	2012	2020	0	0
40	Paul Hale	(Scotland)	MF	26 January 2003 (aged 17)	Academy	2019	2021	0	0
42	Lewis Robertson	(Scotland)	MF	1 January 2003 (aged 17)	Rangers	2019	2021	0	0
52	Mark O'Hara	(Scotland)	MF	12 December 1995 (aged 24)	Loan from Peterborough United	2019	2020	20	2
	Harry Robinson	(Northern Ireland)	MF	26 September 2000 (aged 19)	Oldham Athletic	2020	2020	0	0
Forwards
8	Tony Watt	(Scotland)	FW	29 December 1993 (aged 26)	CSKA Sofia	2020	2021	6	2
9	Chris Long	(England)	FW	25 February 1995 (aged 25)	Blackpool	2019	2020	31	11
12	Christy Manzinga	(Democratic Republic of the Congo)	FW	31 January 1995 (aged 25)	Sporting Châtelet	2019	2020	7	1
14	Jermaine Hylton	(England)	FW	28 June 1993 (aged 26)	Solihull Moors	2019	2021	36	4
17	Rolando Aarons	(England)	FW	16 November 1995 (aged 24)	loan from Newcastle United	2020	2020	8	1
25	Jamie Semple	(Scotland)	FW	17 May 2000 (aged 20)	Academy	2018	2021	6	0
29	Cole Starrs	(Scotland)	FW	25 April 2002 (aged 18)	Academy		2020	0	0
37	Ross Maciver	(Scotland)	FW	28 February 1999 (aged 21)	Ross County	2019	2021	8	1
39	Findlay Cook	(Scotland)	FW	31 May 2002 (aged 17)	Academy		2021	0	0
44	Mikael Ndjoli	(England)	FW	16 December 1998 (aged 21)	loan from AFC Bournemouth	2020	2020	2	0
Away on loan
13	Rohan Ferguson	(Scotland)	GK	6 December 1997 (aged 22)	Airdrieonians	2017	2020	1	0
21	Adam Livingstone	(Scotland)	DF	22 February 1998 (aged 22)	Academy	2008	2020	5	0
28	David Devine	(Scotland)	DF	20 June 2001 (aged 18)	Academy	2019	2021	1	0
31	P. J. Morrison	(Scotland)	GK	1 January 1998 (aged 22)	Academy	2009	2020	0	0
Left during the season
8	Casper Sloth	(Denmark)	MF	26 March 1992 (aged 28)	Silkeborg	2019	2021	1	0
17	James Scott	(Scotland)	FW	30 August 2000 (aged 19)	Academy			42	7
24	Danny Johnson	(England)	FW	28 February 1993 (aged 27)	Gateshead	2018	2020	28	8
27	Craig Tanner	(England)	FW	27 October 1994 (aged 25)	Reading	2017		36	9
30	Reece McAlear	(Scotland)	MF	12 February 2002 (aged 18)	Academy			0	0
44	Devante Cole	(England)	FW	10 May 1995 (aged 25)	loan from Wigan Athletic	2019	2020	21	4

=== Out on loan ===
Note: Flags indicate national team as defined under FIFA eligibility rules; some limited exceptions apply. Players may hold more than one non-FIFA nationality.

No.	Pos.	Nation	Player
13	GK	SCO	Rohan Ferguson (at Linfield)
21	DF	SCO	Adam Livingstone (at Clyde)

No.	Pos.	Nation	Player
28	DF	SCO	David Devine (at Queen of the South)
31	GK	SCO	P. J. Morrison (at Cowdenbeath)

=== Left club during season ===
Note: Flags indicate national team as defined under FIFA eligibility rules; some limited exceptions apply. Players may hold more than one non-FIFA nationality.

No.	Pos.	Nation	Player
8	FW	DEN	Casper Sloth
17	FW	SCO	James Scott (to Hull City)
24	FW	ENG	Danny Johnson (to Dundee)

No.	Pos.	Nation	Player
27	FW	ENG	Craig Tanner
30	MF	SCO	Reece McAlear (to Norwich City)
44	FW	ENG	Devante Cole (loan return to Wigan Athletic)

== Friendlies ==
26 June 2019 Friendly	Crusaders	1–0	Motherwell	Belfast
19:45 BST	Hale 25'	Report		Stadium: Seaview

29 June 2019 Friendly	Linfield	0–3	Motherwell	Belfast
15:00 BST		Report	Long 28'; Hartley 47'; Carroll 68'	Stadium: Windsor Park

2 July 2019 Friendly	Gretna 2008	0–7	Motherwell	Gretna
19:15 BST		Report	Hylton 40'; Johnson 41', 54', 88'; Tait 52'; Maguire 63'; Trialist 77'	Stadium: Raydale Park

6 July 2019 Friendly	Darlington	0–3	Motherwell	Darlington
14:00 BST		Report	Long 39'; Donnelly 45'; Semple 86'	Stadium: Blackwell Meadows

== Competitions ==
=== Premiership ===
==== League table ====
Pos	Team	Pld	W	D	L	GF	GA	GD	Pts	PPG	Qualification or relegation (Note: All play-off matches were cancelled, as clubs voted to curtail the season due to the COVID-19 pandemic.)
1	Celtic (C)	30	26	2	2	89	19	+70	80	2.67	Qualification for the Champions League first qualifying round
2	Rangers	29	21	4	4	64	19	+45	67	2.31	Qualification for the Europa League second qualifying round (Note: Since the 2019–20 Scottish Cup was postponed and could not be completed by the UEFA registration deadline of 3 August 2020, the spot awarded to the Scottish Cup winners (Europa League second qualifying round) was passed to the second-placed team, while the fourth-placed team also qualified for European competition.)
3	Motherwell	30	14	4	12	41	38	+3	46	1.53	Qualification for the Europa League first qualifying round
4	Aberdeen	30	12	9	9	40	36	+4	45	1.50	Qualification for the Europa League first qualifying round
5	Livingston	30	10	9	11	41	39	+2	39	1.30	

Source: BBC SPFL
Rules for classification: 1) Points per game; 2) Goal difference; 3) Goals scored; 4) Head-to-head points; 5) Head-to-Head goal difference; 6) Play-off (only if deciding champion, UEFA competitions qualification, second stage group allocation or relegation).
(C) Champions

==== Results by round ====
Round	1	2	3	4	5	6	7	8	9	10	11	12	13	14	15	16	17	18	19	20	21	22	23	24	25	26	27	28	29	30
Ground	A	H	A	H	A	H	A	H	H	A	H	H	A	A	H	A	H	H	A	A	H	A	H	A	H	A	A	H	H	A
Result	D	L	W	W	W	L	W	W	L	L	W	W	L	L	W	W	W	L	W	W	L	W	D	L	L	L	D	L	W	D
Position	7	10	6	5	3	4	3	3	3	4	3	3	4	4	4	4	3	4	3	3	3	3	3	3	3	4	3	3	3	3

Source: See Results
A = Away; H = Home; W = Win; D = Draw; L = Loss

==== Results summary ====
Overall								Home						Away					
Pld	W	D	L	GF	GA	GD	Pts	W	D	L	GF	GA	GD	W	D	L	GF	GA	GD
30	14	4	12	41	37	+4	46	7	1	6	22	20	+2	7	3	6	19	17	+2

Source: See Results

==== Results ====
3 August 2019 1	Livingston	0–0	Motherwell	Livingston
15:00 BST (UTC+1)	Dykes (yellow card) 51'	Report	Ilić 18'; Donnelly (yellow card) 79'; Carroll (yellow card) 90+2'	Stadium: Almondvale Stadium; Attendance: 2,633; Referee: David Munro

10 August 2019 2	Motherwell	2–5	Celtic	Motherwell
12:00 BST (UTC+1)	Donnelly 12', 90+1' (yellow card) 85'; Gallagher (yellow card) 45+2'; Hylton (yellow card) 71'; Tait (yellow card) 83'; Gillespie (yellow card) 85'	Report	Ajer 14'; Griffiths 41'; Forrest 66'; Édouard 76'; Christie 86' (pen.)	Stadium: Fir Park; Attendance: 8,822; Referee: Nick Walsh

24 August 2019 3	Hamilton Academical	1–3	Motherwell	Hamilton
15:00 BST (UTC+1)	Hamilton (red card) 20'; Cunningham 24' (pen.)	Report	Gogić 16' (o.g.); Donnelly 21' (pen.) (yellow card) 88'; Long 51'	Stadium: New Douglas Park; Attendance: 2,927; Referee: Andrew Dallas

31 August 2019 4	Motherwell	3–0	Hibernian	Motherwell
15:00 BST (UTC+1)	Donnelly (yellow card) 16' (goal) 80' (pen.); Seedorf 23'; Long (yellow card) 51'; Gallagher (yellow card) 71'; Hylton 86'	Report	Allan (yellow card) 45'; Mallan (yellow card)	Stadium: Fir Park; Attendance: 5,964; Referee: Steven McLean

14 September 2019 5	Heart of Midlothian	2–3	Motherwell	Edinburgh
15:00 BST (UTC+1)	Halkett (yellow card) 58'; Ikpeazu 61' (yellow card) 90+5'; Berra (yellow card) 62'; Meshino 86'	Report	Carroll (yellow card) 9'; Gallagher 20'; Donnelly (yellow card) 22'; Seedorf 52' (yellow card) 53'; Hylton 66'	Stadium: Tynecastle; Attendance: 15,862; Referee: Euan Anderson

21 September 2019 6	Motherwell	1–2	Ross County	Motherwell
15:00 BST (UTC+1)	Gallagher (yellow card) 58'; Campbell 61'; Carroll (yellow card) 78' (yellow-red card) 80'	Report	Graham 75'; Gardyne (yellow card) 84'; Stewart 88'; Spittal (yellow card) 90+4'	Stadium: Fir Park; Attendance: 4,620; Referee: Alan Muir

28 September 2019 7	St Johnstone	0–1	Motherwell	Perth
15:00 BST (UTC+1)	Tanser (penalty missed) 55'; Davidson (yellow card) 68'	Report	Hartley (yellow card) 24'; Cole 42'; Polworth (yellow card) 68'; Tait (yellow card) 80'; Donnelly (red card) 90+4'	Stadium: McDiarmid Park; Attendance: 2,972; Referee: Gavin Duncan

5 October 2019 8	Motherwell	2–0	St Mirren	Motherwell
15:00 BST (UTC+1)	Scott 39'; Long 86'	Report	Mullen (yellow card) 57'; Foley (yellow card) 64'	Stadium: Fir Park; Attendance: 5,101; Referee: John Beaton

19 October 2019 9	Motherwell	0–3	Aberdeen	Motherwell
15:00 BST (UTC+1)	Scott (penalty missed) 5'; Grimshaw (yellow card) 90'	Report	Cosgrove 15'; McGinn 53'; Vyner 60' (yellow card) 72'; McKenna (yellow card) 90+3'	Stadium: Fir Park; Attendance: 5,640; Referee: Euan Anderson

27 October 2019 10	Rangers	2–1	Motherwell	Glasgow
15:00 GMT (UTC)	Tavernier (penalty missed) 38'; Defoe 45+1'; Helander 80'	Report	Cole 21'; Polworth (yellow card) 42'; Gillespie (yellow card) 84'; Donnelly (yellow card) 85'	Stadium: Ibrox Stadium; Attendance: 49,629; Referee: Andrew Dallas

30 October 2019 11	Motherwell	2–1	Kilmarnock	Motherwell
19:45 GMT (UTC)	Donnelly 15'; Cole 54'; Grimshaw (yellow card) 56'	Report	Bruce (red card) 14'; Thomas 31'; Dicker (yellow card) 49'; Johnson (yellow card) 85'	Stadium: Fir Park; Attendance: 4,676; Referee: Don Robertson

2 November 2019 12	Motherwell	2–1	Livingston	Motherwell
15:00 GMT (UTC)	Long 47'; Gallagher (yellow card) 52'; Campbell 83'	Report	Guthrie (yellow card) 30'; Lawless 60' (pen.) (yellow card) 69'	Stadium: Fir Park; Attendance: 4,423; Referee: Euan Anderson

10 November 2019 13	Celtic	2–0	Motherwell	Glasgow
15:00 GMT (UTC)	Édouard 19'; Tait 54' (o.g.)	Report	Scott (yellow card) 87'	Stadium: Celtic Park; Attendance: 57,137; Referee: Alan Muir

23 November 2019 14	Hibernian	3–1	Motherwell	Edinburgh
15:00 GMT (UTC)	Porteous (yellow card) 18'; Doidge 21'; Kamberi 25'; Naismith (yellow card) 67'; Maxwell (yellow card) 85'; Horgan 86'	Report	Polworth 9'; Grimshaw (yellow card) 17'; Carroll (yellow card) 65'	Stadium: Easter Road; Attendance: 15,984; Referee: John Beaton

30 November 2019 15	Motherwell	4–0	St Johnstone	Motherwell
15:00 GMT (UTC)	Cole 29'; Hartley 49'; Carroll 72'; Manzinga 89'	Report	McCann (yellow card) 70'	Stadium: Fir Park; Attendance: 4,092; Referee: Euan Anderson

4 December 2019 16	St Mirren	0–3	Motherwell	Paisley
19:45 GMT (UTC)	P.McGinn (yellow card) 86'	Report	Cole (yellow card) 15'; Scott 28', 33'; Campbell 67'	Stadium: St Mirren Park; Attendance: 4,240; Referee: Andrew Dallas

7 December 2019 17	Motherwell	1–0	Heart of Midlothian	Motherwell
15:00 GMT (UTC)	Long 40' (yellow card) 66'; Campbell (yellow card) 75'; Donnelly (yellow card) 81'	Report	Berra (yellow card) 62'; Mulraney (red card) 90+2'	Stadium: Fir Park; Attendance: 4,745; Referee: Alan Muir

15 December 2019 18	Motherwell	0–2	Rangers	Motherwell
12:00 GMT (UTC)	Donnelly (yellow card) 44'; Gallagher (yellow card) 45'; Long (yellow card) 83'	Report	Katić 27'; Jack (yellow card) 45'; Morelos (yellow card) 57' (yellow-red card) 71' (goal) 69'; Tavernier (yellow card) 79'	Stadium: Fir Park; Attendance: 8,359; Referee: Don Robertson

21 December 2019 19	Kilmarnock	0–1	Motherwell	Kilmarnock
15:00 GMT (UTC)	Del Fabro (yellow card) 59'	Report	Donnelly (yellow card) 36'; Carroll 67'; Gillespie (yellow card) 78'; Hartley (yellow card) 82'	Stadium: Rugby Park; Attendance: 5,688; Referee: Willie Collum

26 December 2019 20	Ross County	1–2	Motherwell	Dingwall
15:00 GMT (UTC)	Spittal 24'; Spence (yellow card) 48' (red card) 62'; Foster (yellow card) 71'; Fontaine (yellow card) 90+4'; Graham (yellow card) 90+5'	Report	Gallagher (yellow card) 49' (goal) 90+2'; Maciver 81'; Hartley (yellow card) 90+4'; Polworth (yellow card) 90+5'	Stadium: Victoria Park; Attendance: 4,181; Referee: Greg Aitken

29 December 2019 21	Motherwell	1–2	Hamilton Academical	Motherwell
15:00 GMT (UTC)	Long 5'; Hylton (yellow card) 63'; O'Hara (yellow card) 75'	Report	Martin (yellow card) 11'; Stubbs (yellow card) 52'; McGowan 68'; Moyo 77'; Alston (yellow card) 81'	Stadium: Fir Park; Attendance: 6,048; Referee: John Beaton

22 January 2020 22	Aberdeen	0–1	Motherwell	Aberdeen
19:45 GMT (UTC)	Cosgrove (yellow card) 75'	Report	Long (yellow card) 21'; Donnelly (yellow card) 37' (goal) 45+1'; Carroll (yellow card) 71'	Stadium: Pittodrie Stadium; Attendance: 12,365; Referee: Willie Collum

25 January 2020 23	Motherwell	0–0	Hibernian	Motherwell
15:00 GMT (UTC)	Donnelly (yellow card) 34'	Report	Omeonga (yellow card) 24'; Doidge (yellow card) 37'; Newell (yellow card) 49'; James (yellow card) 89'; Boyle (yellow card) 90+1'	Stadium: Fir Park; Attendance: 5,767; Referee: Colin Steven

1 February 2020 24	Livingston	1–0	Motherwell	Livingston
15:00 GMT (UTC)	Bartley (yellow card) 56'; Dykes (yellow card) 56'; Taylor-Sinclair 67'	Report	Tait (yellow card) 70'; O'Hara (yellow card) 89'; Carroll (yellow card) 90+1'	Stadium: Almondvale Stadium; Attendance: 1,932; Referee: John Beaton

5 February 2020 25	Motherwell	0–4	Celtic	Motherwell
19:45 GMT (UTC)	Gallagher (yellow card) 79'	Report	Édouard 9', 80'; Griffiths 51'; McGregor 75'	Stadium: Fir Park; Attendance: 8,534; Referee: Don Robertson

12 February 2020 26	St Johnstone	2–1	Motherwell	Perth
19:45 GMT (UTC)	Hendry 27'; Kane 90+3'	Report	Long 32'; Donnelly (yellow card) 69'; Manzinga (yellow card) 77' (yellow-red card) 82'; Carroll (yellow card) 90+1'	Stadium: McDiarmid Park; Attendance: 2,655; Referee: Nick Walsh

15 February 2020 27	Motherwell	–	St Mirren	Motherwell
15:00 GMT (UTC)				Stadium: Fir Park
Note: Match postponed due to adverse weather conditions caused by Storm Dennis.

22 February 2020 28	Hamilton Academical	0–0	Motherwell	Hamilton
15:00 GMT (UTC)	Hunt (yellow card) 4'; Gogić (yellow card) 59'	Report	Long (yellow card) 31' (yellow-red card) 37'; O'Hara (yellow card) 34'; Gillespie (yellow card) 73'; Gallagher (yellow card) 90+3'	Stadium: New Douglas Park; Attendance: 2,531; Referee: Colin Steven

25 February 2020 27	Motherwell	1–1	St Mirren	Motherwell
19:45 GMT (UTC)	Donnelly 12' (pen.); Gallagher (yellow card) 90'	Report	Waters (yellow card) 17'; Obika 50'; Foley (yellow card) 70'; Wallace (yellow card) 80'; Durmuş 87'; Hladký (yellow card) 89'; Famewo (yellow card) 90+1'	Stadium: Fir Park; Attendance: 3,636; Referee: David Munro
Note: Originally scheduled for 15 February 2020 but postponed due to adverse weather conditions caused by Storm Dennis.

4 March 2020 29	Motherwell	4–1	Ross County	Motherwell
19:45 GMT (UTC)	O'Hara 17'; Aarons (yellow card) 20'; Campbell 25', 75'; Tait (yellow card) 65'; Watt 90+3'	Report	Fontaine 3'; Morris (yellow card) 16'; Vigurs (yellow card) 64'; Stewart (yellow card) 80'	Stadium: Fir Park; Attendance: 3,191; Referee: Alan Muir

7 March 2020 30	Heart of Midlothian	1–1	Motherwell	Edinburgh
15:00 GMT (UTC)	Washington 49'; Dikamona (yellow card) 61'; Hickey (yellow card) 90+4'	Report	Long 21'; Maguire (yellow card) 39'; Aarons (yellow card) 58'; O'Hara (yellow card) 58'	Stadium: Tynecastle; Attendance: 17,339; Referee: Don Robertson

13 March 2020 31	Motherwell	–	Aberdeen	Motherwell
19:45 GMT (UTC)				Stadium: Fir Park
Note: Match postponed on 13 March due to the COVID-19 pandemic.

21 March 2020 32	Motherwell	–	Kilmarnock	Motherwell
15:00 GMT (UTC)				Stadium: Fir Park
Note: Match postponed on 13 March due to the COVID-19 pandemic.

4 April 2020 33	Rangers	–	Motherwell	Glasgow
15:00 GMT (UTC)				Stadium: Ibrox Stadium
Note: Match postponed on 13 March due to the COVID-19 pandemic.

=== Scottish Cup ===
18 January 2020 Fourth Round	Dundee	0–3	Motherwell	Dundee
15:00 GMT (UTC)	McGhee (yellow card) 69'; Dorrans (yellow card) 83'; Kerr (yellow card) 89'	Report	Long 22', 30', 75' (yellow card) 69'	Stadium: Dens Park; Attendance: 2,407; Referee: Steven McLean

8 February 2020 Fifth Round	St Mirren	1–1	Motherwell	Paisley
15:00 GMT (UTC)	Jakubiak 74'; McCarthy (yellow card) 89'; Famewo (yellow card) 90'	Report	O'Hara 21'; Polworth (yellow card) 90'	Stadium: St Mirren Park; Attendance: 4,323; Referee: Andrew Dallas

18 February 2020 Fifth Round Replay	Motherwell	4–4 (a.e.t.) (2–3 p)	St Mirren	Motherwell
19:45 GMT (UTC)	Polworth 27'; Carroll (yellow card) 31'; Mugabi (yellow card) 38'; Watt 57'; Aarons 73'; Campbell 74' (yellow card) 99'	Report	Obika 14', 31'; Hartley 33' (o.g.); Foley 43'; McGrath (yellow card) 74'; MacPherson (yellow card) 106'	Stadium: Fir Park; Attendance: 4,534; Referee: Gavin Duncan
	Penalties
	Donnelly (penalty missed); Watt (penalty missed); Aarons (penalty scored); Polworth (penalty scored); Hylton (penalty missed)		(penalty scored) McGrath; Andreu (penalty missed); MacPherson (penalty missed); McAllister (penalty scored); Obika (penalty scored)

=== League Cup ===
==== Group stage ====
===== Table =====
Pos	Team	Pld	W	PW	PL	L	GF	GA	GD	Pts	Qualification
1	Motherwell	4	4	0	0	0	13	0	+13	12	Qualification for the Second Round
2	Greenock Morton	4	2	1	0	1	14	8	+6	8	Qualification for the Second Round
3	Queen of the South	4	1	1	1	1	10	10	0	6	
4	Dumbarton	4	1	0	0	3	3	12	−9	3	
5	Annan Athletic	4	0	0	1	3	3	13	−10	1	

Rules for classification: 1) goal difference, 2) goals scored, 3) away goals scored, 4) matches won, 5) away matches won, 6) drawing of lots.

===== Results =====
13 July 2019 1	Queen of the South	0–3	Motherwell	Dumfries
15:00 BST (UTC+1)		Report	Donnelly 71' (pen.); Seedorf 90'; Hylton 90+2'	Stadium: Palmerston Park; Attendance: 1,956; Referee: Don Robertson

19 July 2019 2	Motherwell	4–0	Greenock Morton	Motherwell
19:45 BST (UTC+1)	Scott 22', 66'; Hylton 76'; Donnelly 82'	Report		Stadium: Fir Park; Attendance: 3,167; Referee: Willie Collum

23 July 2019 3	Dumbarton	0–2	Motherwell	Dumbarton
19:45 BST (UTC+1)	Hutton (yellow card) 70'	Report	Ilić 42'; Hartley 76'	Stadium: The C&G Systems Stadium; Attendance: 1,394; Referee: Colin Steven

27 July 2019 4	Motherwell	4–0	Annan Athletic	Motherwell
15:00 BST (UTC+1)	Donnelly 20', 89'; Polworth 44'; Scott 90+2'	Report	McLean (yellow card) 12'; T.Muir (yellow card) 29'; E.Griffiths (yellow card) 67'	Stadium: Fir Park; Attendance: 2,763; Referee: Alan Newlands

==== Knockout phase ====
16 August 2019 Second round	Motherwell	1–2	Heart of Midlothian	Motherwell
19:45 BST (UTC+1)	Long 60'; Tait (yellow card) 81'; Seedorf (yellow card) 82'	Report	Clare (penalty missed) 9 Damour (yellow card) 36'; Smith 40' (yellow card) 81'; Washington 45+2' (pen.)	Stadium: Fir Park; Attendance: 5,597; Referee: Bobby Madden

=== Challenge Cup ===
7 August 2019 First round	Motherwell U21s	1–0	Spartans	Airdrie
19:45 BST (UTC+1)	Semple 18'; Devine (yellow card) 87'	Report	Michael Allan (yellow card) 84'	Stadium: Excelsior Stadium; Attendance: 170; Referee: Ross Hardie

13 August 2019 Second round	Clyde	4–0	Motherwell U21s	Cumbernauld
19:45 BST (UTC+1)	Goodwillie 6'; Love 59'; McNiff 72'; Devine 84' (o.g.)	Report	Devine (yellow card) 57'	Stadium: Broadwood Stadium; Attendance: 372; Referee: Chris Graham

== Squad statistics ==
=== Appearances ===
As of match played 7 March 2020

No.	Pos	Nat	Player	Total		Scottish Premiership		Scottish Cup		League Cup	
No.	Pos	Nat	Player	Apps	Goals	Apps	Goals	Apps	Goals	Apps	Goals
2	DF	(Scotland) SCO	Richard Tait	20	0	12+2	0	1+1	0	4	0
3	DF	(Republic of Ireland) IRL	Jake Carroll	27	2	21	2	3	0	3	0
4	MF	(England) ENG	Liam Grimshaw	31	0	25	0	2	0	3+1	0
5	DF	(England) ENG	Peter Hartley	30	2	23+2	1	3	0	2	1
6	MF	(Scotland) SCO	Allan Campbell	37	6	30	5	2+1	1	4	0
7	MF	(Scotland) SCO	David Turnbull	2	0	0+2	0	0	0	0	0
8	FW	(Scotland) SCO	Tony Watt	6	2	2+2	1	1+1	1	0	0
9	FW	(England) ENG	Chris Long	31	11	21+4	7	2	3	2+2	1
11	MF	(Suriname) SUR	Sherwin Seedorf	29	3	9+14	2	0+1	0	3+2	1
12	FW	(Democratic Republic of the Congo) COD	Christy Manzinga	7	1	0+6	1	0+1	0	0	0
14	FW	(England) ENG	Jermaine Hylton	35	4	18+9	2	2+1	0	3+2	2
15	DF	(Scotland) SCO	Barry Maguire	9	0	4+3	0	0	0	1+1	0
16	MF	(Croatia) CRO	Christian Ilić	13	1	3+5	0	0	0	3+2	1
17	FW	(England) ENG	Rolando Aarons	8	1	6	0	2	1	0	0
18	DF	(Republic of Ireland) IRL	Charles Dunne	7	0	3	0	0	0	4	0
19	MF	(Scotland) SCO	Liam Polworth	37	3	28+2	1	3	1	4	1
20	GK	(England) ENG	Mark Gillespie	38	0	30	0	3	0	5	0
22	DF	(Northern Ireland) NIR	Liam Donnelly	29	11	22	7	2+1	0	4	4
24	DF	(Uganda) UGA	Bevis Mugabi	11	0	6+4	0	1	0	0	0
25	FW	(Scotland) SCO	Jamie Semple	3	0	0	0	0	0	2+1	0
31	DF	(Scotland) SCO	Declan Gallagher	36	2	30	2	2	0	4	0
37	FW	(Scotland) SCO	Ross Maciver	8	1	1+6	1	1	0	0	0
44	FW	(England) ENG	Mikael Ndjoli	2	0	0+1	0	0+1	0	0	0
52	MF	(Scotland) SCO	Mark O'Hara	20	2	9+8	1	2+1	1	0	0
Players away from the club on loan:
Players who left Motherwell during the season:
8	MF	(Denmark) DEN	Casper Sloth	1	0	0	0	0	0	0+1	0
17	FW	(Scotland) SCO	James Scott	28	6	15+7	3	1	0	3+2	3
44	FW	(England) ENG	Devante Cole	21	4	12+7	4	0	0	1+1	0

=== Goal scorers ===
As of match played 7 March 2020

Ranking	Position	Nation	Number	Name	Scottish Premiership	Scottish Cup	League Cup	Total
1	DF	(Northern Ireland)	22	Liam Donnelly	7	0	4	11
1	FW	(England)	9	Chris Long	7	3	1	11
3	MF	(Scotland)	6	Allan Campbell	5	1	0	6
3	FW	(Scotland)	17	James Scott	3	0	3	6
5	FW	(England)	44	Devante Cole	4	0	0	4
5	FW	(England)	14	Jermaine Hylton	2	0	2	4
7	MF	(Suriname)	11	Sherwin Seedorf	2	0	1	3
7	MF	(Scotland)	19	Liam Polworth	1	1	1	3
9	DF	(Republic of Ireland)	3	Jake Carroll	2	0	0	2
9	DF	(Scotland)	31	Declan Gallagher	2	0	0	2
9	MF	(Scotland)	52	Mark O'Hara	1	1	0	2
9	FW	(Scotland)	8	Tony Watt	1	1	0	2
9	DF	(England)	5	Peter Hartley	1	0	1	2
14	FW	(Democratic Republic of the Congo)	12	Christy Manzinga	1	0	0	1
14	FW	(Scotland)	37	Ross Maciver	1	0	0	1
14	FW	(England)	17	Rolando Aarons	0	1	0	1
14	MF	(Croatia)	16	Christian Ilić	0	0	1	1
14				Own goal	1	0	0	1
TOTALS					40	8	14	62

=== Clean sheets ===
As of match played 7 March 2020

Ranking	Position	Nation	Number	Name	Scottish Premiership	Scottish Cup	League Cup	Total
1	GK	(England)	20	Mark Gillespie	11	1	4	16
TOTALS					11	1	4	16

=== Disciplinary record ===
As of match played 7 March 2020

Number	Nation	Position	Name	Scottish Premiership		Scottish Cup		League Cup		Total	
Number	Nation	Position	Name	Booked	Sent off (straight red)	Booked	Sent off (straight red)	Booked	Sent off (straight red)	Booked	Sent off (straight red)
2	(Scotland)	DF	Richard Tait	4	0	0	0	1	0	5	0
3	(Republic of Ireland)	DF	Jake Carroll	8	1	1	0	0	0	9	1
4	(England)	MF	Liam Grimshaw	3	0	0	0	0	0	3	0
5	(England)	DF	Peter Hartley	3	0	0	0	0	0	3	0
6	(Scotland)	MF	Allan Campbell	1	0	0	0	0	0	1	0
9	(England)	FW	Chris Long	6	1	1	0	0	0	7	1
11	(Suriname)	MF	Sherwin Seedorf	1	0	0	0	1	0	2	0
12	(Democratic Republic of the Congo)	FW	Christy Manzinga	2	1	0	0	0	0	2	1
14	(England)	FW	Jermaine Hylton	2	0	0	0	0	0	2	0
15	(Scotland)	DF	Barry Maguire	1	0	0	0	0	0	1	0
16	(Croatia)	MF	Christian Ilić	1	0	0	0	0	0	1	0
17	(England)	FW	Rolando Aarons	2	0	1	0	0	0	3	0
19	(Scotland)	MF	Liam Polworth	3	0	1	0	0	0	4	0
20	(England)	GK	Mark Gillespie	4	0	0	0	0	0	4	0
22	(Northern Ireland)	DF	Liam Donnelly	12	1	0	0	0	0	12	1
24	(Uganda)	DF	Bevis Mugabi	0	0	1	0	0	0	1	0
31	(Scotland)	DF	Declan Gallagher	9	0	0	0	0	0	9	0
52	(Scotland)	MF	Mark O'Hara	4	0	0	0	0	0	4	0
Players who left Motherwell during the season:
17	(Scotland)	FW	James Scott	1	0	0	0	0	0	1	0
44	(England)	FW	Devante Cole	1	0	0	0	0	0	1	0
			TOTALS	58	4	5	0	2	0	75	4

== See also ==
- List of Motherwell F.C. seasons
