= Seedorf family =

Dutch family of Surinamese origin

- Origin: Berg en Dal plantation, Suriname
- Members: Clarence Seedorf; Chedric Seedorf; Stefano Seedorf; Collin Seedorf; Cain Seedorf; Quentin Seedorf; Sherwin Seedorf

The Seedorf family is a Dutch family of Surinamese origin that has produced three generations of footballers and coaches. Its best-known member is Clarence Seedorf, who won the UEFA Champions League four times and is the only player to have won the competition with three different clubs: Ajax, Real Madrid and AC Milan. His father, Johann Seedorf, a former player, guided the careers of his three sons, Clarence, Jürgen and Chedric, all of whom came through the Ajax youth academy, as did their cousin Stefano.

The surname dates from the abolition of slavery in Suriname in 1863, when it was recorded for four formerly enslaved people on the Berg en Dal plantation on the Suriname River. Genealogical research published in 2018 traced Clarence Seedorf's paternal line to that plantation and to the Moravian Church, in which two of his forebears worked as evangelists.

The family's younger generation includes Clarence's nephews Collin, Cain, Quentin and Jelani, all professional footballers, and his son Denzel, who plays in the AC Milan academy. More distant relatives, among them the winger Sherwin Seedorf, have also played professionally. Several members have stayed in the game after their playing careers: Clarence has managed clubs in Italy, China, Spain and Brazil as well as the Cameroon national football team, and Chedric has become a coach in Amsterdam amateur football.

== Origins ==
=== Emancipation and the surname ===
The family's roots in Suriname lie at Berg en Dal, a former plantation and village on the upper Suriname River, about 100 km (62 mi) south of Paramaribo. Established as a cacao estate, Berg en Dal was later worked for timber; in 1847 it was listed as a timber concession of 9,750 akkers with 289 enslaved workers. At the time of emancipation the plantation was owned in shares by investors in the Netherlands and Germany, among them the Amsterdam firm Rothuijs & Co. and several shareholders in Germany, one of whom lived in Hameln, Hanover.

Slavery in Suriname was abolished in 1863. Many of the surnames given to the freed population at that time, Seedorf among them, were devised by colonial officials or former owners rather than chosen by the people who received them. The emancipation register lists four people on Berg en Dal under the name Seedorf, including Patientie Rosiana Seedorf and two of her children: Pluto Petrus (born 1852) and Proserpina (born 1 March 1863). Both children were registered as members of the Moravian Church. Because Proserpina was born after the owners had filed their claim, she was not counted towards the compensation paid to the owners. (Note: One English-language version of the MyHeritage research gives the year of emancipation as 1873. The Dutch version and the emancipation register itself give 1863.)

According to a family tradition recorded by the genealogy company MyHeritage, the Seedorfs descend from an Indigenous child from the Upper Suriname region. The story holds that the child was found alone in the forest by a Moravian missionary, taken to Paramaribo and registered under the name Seedorf, described variously as the missionary's own name and as the name of a mission post. The child later ended up enslaved on Berg en Dal.

=== Clarence Seedorf's ancestry ===
In 2018 MyHeritage published research into Clarence Seedorf's family history as part of a project with several retired international footballers. It identified Patientie Rosiana Seedorf as his direct ancestor and traced the female line back to her mother, Proserpina, who was born in Suriname in 1795, most probably at Berg en Dal. The enslaved population of Berg en Dal had been taught by Moravian missionaries. Pluto Petrus Seedorf and his son Adam, Clarence's great-great-grandfather and great-grandfather, both became evangelists. Because his parents worked for the mission, Clarence's grandfather Frederik grew up at Kleinwelka, a boarding school for missionaries' children. Frederik later built a house in Beekhuizen, Paramaribo, where Clarence was born in 1976. A DNA test carried out as part of the same project indicated that Clarence's ancestry is predominantly West African.

=== Move to the Netherlands ===
Johann Seedorf moved his family from Paramaribo to the Netherlands, where Clarence grew up in Almere. Jürgen and Chedric began playing at the Almere amateur club AS '80 before joining Ajax.

== Members ==
=== Johann Seedorf ===
Johann Seedorf (Note: His first name is also spelled Johan in some sources.) is a former professional footballer born in Paramaribo. After moving to the Netherlands he guided the careers of his sons and acted as their agent. In April 1999 Jürgen and Chedric left the Ajax youth academy with immediate effect. According to their father, they left because of a difference of opinion with the club's director of youth development, Hans Westerhof.

=== Clarence Seedorf ===
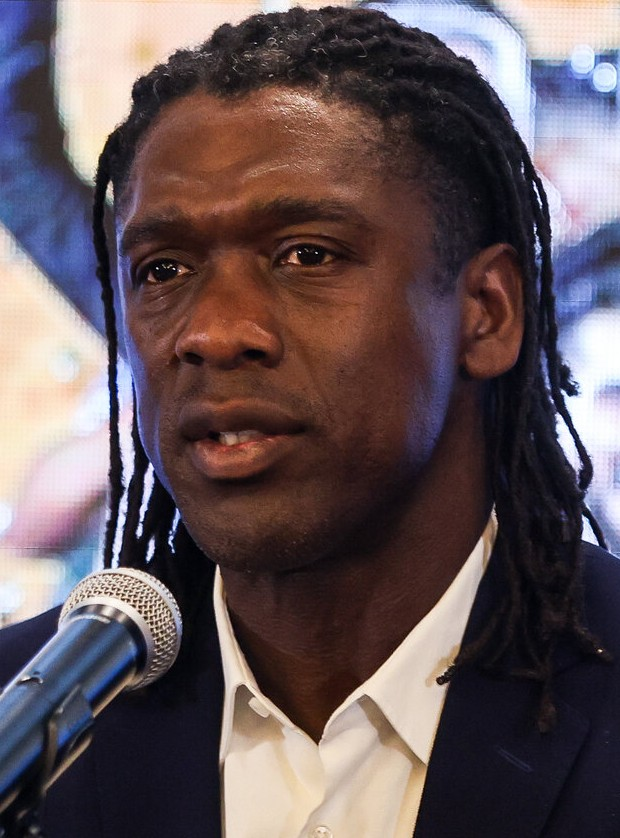
Clarence Seedorf at a press conference in June 2025

Clarence Clyde Seedorf (born 1 April 1976 in Paramaribo) is the eldest of Johann's three sons and the family's most successful player. A midfielder, he came through Ajax and won the Champions League four times: with Ajax, with Real Madrid and twice with AC Milan, where he played from 2002 to 2012. He also won 87 caps for the Netherlands national football team. After finishing his playing career at Botafogo in Brazil, he managed AC Milan in 2014, Shenzhen in 2016 and Deportivo de La Coruña in 2018, and then coached Cameroon together with Patrick Kluivert. In October 2026 he was appointed head coach of the Brazilian club Corinthians, replacing Fernando Diniz on a contract until the end of 2027.

Clarence runs a charity, Champions for Children, and has organised youth football in Suriname. In 2010 he said that around 700 children were playing weekly in a competition he had set up in the Para District, home of the Clarence Seedorf Stadion. The Nelson Mandela Foundation named him one of its legacy champions in 2009 for the work of his charity.

=== Jürgen Seedorf ===
Jürgen Seedorf (born 1980), an attacking midfielder, spent five years at AS '80 before joining Ajax. There he captained the under-16 side and played for the Netherlands under-17 team under Ronald Koeman and Johan Neeskens. After leaving Ajax in 1999 he played in the youth ranks of Real Madrid, then for RKC Waalwijk, De Graafschap and The Brothers in Suriname. In August 2011 he signed for FC Zwolle on an amateur basis, but he retired in November that year because of heart problems, without playing an official match for the club. He later began a career as a reggae singer under the name Joggo.

=== Chedric Seedorf ===
Chedric Seedorf (born 20 April 1983) is the youngest of the three brothers. He joined Ajax after about a year at AS '80 and reached the semi-finals of the European Under-17 Championship with the Netherlands. After leaving Ajax with Jürgen in 1999, he played for clubs including NAC Breda and Legnano and was under contract with AC Milan. He spent two seasons at Monza from 2009, having arrived at the same time as his cousin Stefano.

Chedric moved into coaching after his playing career. In 2019 he joined his brother's Cameroon staff at the Africa Cup of Nations in Egypt. While there, he was offered a youth coaching post at AFC in Amsterdam. He also set up the Seedorf Talent Development Group. After a season as assistant to Benno Nihom, he became head coach of AFC, a Tweede Divisie club, in August 2025.

=== Stefano Seedorf ===
Stefano Seedorf (born 28 April 1982), a cousin of the three brothers, was registered with Ajax from 2000 to 2004. He also played for NAC Breda, FC Groningen and Veria in Greece, and joined Monza together with Chedric in 2009. Stefano and another relative, Rahmlee Seedorf, have been described as cousins of the three brothers.

=== Younger generation ===
Jelani Seedorf playing for Telstar in 2026

Collin Seedorf (born 1 May 1995), a defender described as Clarence's nephew when he joined Inverness Caledonian Thistle in 2017, (Note: A 2020 report in the Dagblad van het Noorden described Collin as Clarence's achterneef, a Dutch term for a more distant relative than a nephew.) began his professional career at RKC Waalwijk. He has since played for FC Eindhoven, FC Emmen and, from 2025, Željezničar in Bosnia and Herzegovina.

Cain Seedorf (born 19 January 2000), another nephew of Clarence, spent time in the Ajax youth academy. He made his professional debut for ADO Den Haag in April 2021 and later moved from Telstar to Roda JC.

Quentin Seedorf (born 14 September 2000), whom the Polish press has described as Clarence's nephew, moved from the Vitesse academy to Zagłębie Sosnowiec in 2019. He later played for Slavia Sofia in Bulgaria and Dubočica in Serbia.

Jelani Seedorf (born 12 December 2004), a forward from the Rotterdam area whom the Dutch press has described as Clarence's nephew, played for Sparta Rotterdam's reserve team and made a first-team appearance for Sparta. He moved to Telstar during the 2026 winter transfer window and scored his first professional goal against Sparta in April 2026.

Clarence's son, Denzel Miguel Viana Seedorf, was born in Milan on 25 May 2007, two days after his father won the 2007 UEFA Champions League final with AC Milan. He joined the club's academy at the age of twelve. Born in Italy to a Brazilian mother, he holds Italian, Dutch and Brazilian passports. In December 2024 he trained with Milan's first team under Paulo Fonseca, and in April 2026 he made his debut for the reserve side Milan Futuro.

=== Other relatives ===
Regilio Seedorf (born 1988) played for FC Oss and Haaglandia. In 2011 he had trials at Volendam and Veendam. The Dutch press variously described him as Clarence's younger brother and as a neef (cousin or nephew) of Clarence and Jürgen.

Sherwin Seedorf (born 17 March 1998) came through the Feyenoord youth system. He was signed by Wolverhampton Wanderers, had loan spells at Bradford City and Jumilla, and joined Motherwell in 2019. Motherwell described him as having distant family ties to Clarence. He later played in Cyprus and, from 2025, for Banga in Lithuania. In a 2025 interview he said that his family is very large and that he and Clarence are not in contact. (Note: Some reports, including the 2025 interview, have called Sherwin Clarence's nephew.)

== The family in football ==
Four members of the family have played for Ajax: Clarence, Jürgen, Chedric and Stefano. In April 1999 Jürgen, then 18 and playing for Ajax's A1 youth team, and Chedric, 15 and in the B1, left the club with immediate effect after their father disagreed with the director of youth development. In a 2021 interview Jürgen recalled that, after the youth teams moved from De Meer to the De Toekomst complex, Ajax had suddenly turned from a family club into a business.

The family's ties extended to club ownership. By 2011 Clarence was a co-owner of the Italian club Monza, and Jürgen had played for its Surinamese satellite club, The Brothers, before moving to FC Zwolle. Chedric and Stefano had joined Monza at the same time in 2009. The brothers have also worked together in coaching: Chedric was part of Clarence's Cameroon staff in 2019.

Clarence's fame has shaped how other family members are covered. Reports on younger Seedorfs regularly refer to their relationship to him, and Sherwin has spoken about the attention his surname brings and his wish to make his own name.

== Family tree ==
The following tree shows Clarence Seedorf's line of descent as reconstructed by MyHeritage, with his brothers and son.

- Proserpina (born 1795)
  - Patientie Rosiana Seedorf, given the surname at emancipation in 1863
    - Pluto Petrus Seedorf (born 1852), evangelist
      - Adam Seedorf, evangelist
        - Frederik Seedorf
          - Johann Seedorf, footballer and agent
            - Clarence Seedorf (born 1976)
              - Denzel Seedorf (born 2007)
            - Jürgen Seedorf (born 1980)
            - Chedric Seedorf (born 1983)

Relatives whose exact place in the tree has not been publicly documented include Clarence's cousin Stefano Seedorf; his nephews Collin, Cain and Quentin; and the more distant relatives Regilio and Sherwin Seedorf.

== Footballers in the family ==
Name	Born	Relationship to Clarence	Career summary
Johann Seedorf	–	Father	Former player; agent for his sons
Clarence Seedorf	1976	–	Ajax, Real Madrid, AC Milan, Botafogo; four-time Champions League winner; 87 caps for the Netherlands; manager
Jürgen Seedorf	1980	Brother	Ajax and Real Madrid youth; RKC Waalwijk, De Graafschap, The Brothers, FC Zwolle
Chedric Seedorf	1983	Brother	Ajax youth; NAC Breda, Legnano, Monza; head coach of AFC
Stefano Seedorf	1982	Cousin	Ajax, NAC Breda, Groningen, Veria, Monza
Regilio Seedorf	1988	Relative (neef)	FC Oss, Haaglandia
Collin Seedorf	1995	Nephew	RKC Waalwijk, Inverness Caledonian Thistle, FC Eindhoven, FC Emmen, Željezničar
Sherwin Seedorf	1998	Distant relative	Wolverhampton Wanderers, Bradford City, Jumilla, Motherwell, Banga
Cain Seedorf	2000	Nephew	ADO Den Haag, Telstar, Roda JC
Quentin Seedorf	2000	Nephew	Zagłębie Sosnowiec, Slavia Sofia, Dubočica
Jelani Seedorf	2004	Nephew	Jong Sparta, Sparta Rotterdam, Telstar
Denzel Seedorf	2007	Son	AC Milan youth; Milan Futuro

== See also ==
- List of association football families
- Afro-Surinamese
