= Jermaine Hylton =

English footballer

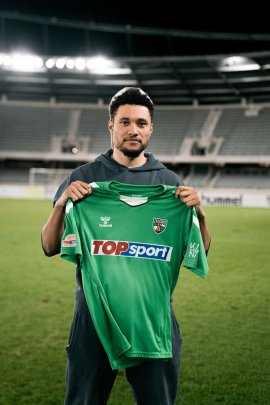
- Hylton at the Zaliris Stadium

Personal information
- Full name: Jermaine Samuel Hylton
- Date of birth: 28 June 1993 (age 33)
- Place of birth: Birmingham, England
- Height: 5 ft 9 in (1.76 m)
- Position: Forward

Team information
- Current team: Hednesford Town

Youth career
- Kidderminster Harriers
- –2009: Birmingham City

Senior career*
| Years | Team | Apps | (Gls) |
| 2009–2012 | Continental Star | | |
| 2012–2015 | Redditch United | 54 | (45) |
| 2015–2017 | Swindon Town | 39 | (1) |
| 2016 | → Guiseley (loan) | 3 | (1) |
| 2017–2019 | Solihull Moors | 69 | (15) |
| 2019–2020 | Motherwell | 33 | (2) |
| 2020–2021 | Ross County | 18 | (1) |
| 2021–2022 | Newport County | 4 | (0) |
| 2022–2023 | Rushall Olympic | 10 | (2) |
| 2023–2024 | Arbroath | 17 | (6) |
| 2024–2025 | Kauno Žalgiris | 12 | (0) |
| 2024 | Kauno Žalgiris B | 6 | (2) |
| 2025– | Hednesford Town | 1 | (0) |
- * Club domestic league appearances and goals as of 18:54, 19 October 2025 (UTC)

Jermaine Samuel Hylton (born 28 June 1993) is an English professional footballer who plays as a forward for National League North club Hednesford Town.

== Club career ==
=== Early career ===
In 2009, Hylton was in the final of Sky1's TV talent show Wayne Rooney's Street Striker. Preceding his release from Birmingham City, Hylton had spells with non-league sides Continental Star and Redditch United. On 22 December 2014, Hylton was invited to play in a professional development game for his former club; Birmingham City by manager Gary Rowett against Manchester City. Hylton scored one goal and had a hand in the other two as he helped the development team to a 3–2 victory.

=== Swindon Town ===
On 3 January 2015 it was reported by Swindon Advertiser that Redditch United started to consider a FA complaint over Swindon's approach to their frontman. The paper stated that Redditch claimed Swindon had broken the 7 day approach until they were allowed to sign the player. On 7 January 2015, Hylton signed for Swindon Town on a 2 1/2-year contract with the club despite Redditch's complaint to the FA over their "illegal" approach. On 12 January 2015, Hylton made his first appearance for Swindon coming on as an 87th-minute substitute for Andy Williams in a 3–0 win against Coventry City at the Ricoh Arena. On 11 April 2015, he went on to score his first goal and the winning goal against Peterborough United.

On 4 October 2016, Hylton joined National League side Guiseley on loan until January 2017. On the same day, he scored on his Guiseley debut in their 6–1 home victory over York City, netting the host's fifth in the 55th minute before being replaced by Michael Rankine in the closing stages of the game. Hylton went on to feature in four more games (in all competitions) for Guiseley before being recalled by parent club; Swindon in December 2016.

In February 2017, Hylton was fined by Swindon Town after he walked out on his side prior to their game against Northampton Town having been told he wasn't involved in the matchday squad by manager Luke Williams.

=== Solihull Moors ===
On 13 July 2017, after a successful trial period, Hylton joined National League side Solihull Moors. After struggling with a long-term injury, Hylton made his Solihull debut in their FA Cup fourth qualifying round tie against Ossett Town in October 2017, in which he featured for the full 90 minutes in the 1–1 draw. On 24 October 2017, he scored his first goal for Solihull during their 2–1 away victory over Eastleigh, netting the game's opener in the 4th minute. On 10 May 2019, it was announced that Hylton was to leave The Moors following the conclusion of his contract.

=== Motherwell ===
On 29 May 2019, Motherwell completed the signing of Hylton on a free transfer, following the expiry of his Solihull Moors contract, becoming the club's fifth signing of the window.

On 13 July 2019, Hylton made his competitive debut for Motherwell in a 3–0 win away to Queen of the South.

=== Ross County ===
On 2 October 2020, Ross County announced the signing of Hylton on a one-year deal. Hylton was released by County on 27 May 2021 along with nine other players.

=== Newport County ===
Hylton signed for Newport County on a one-year contract on 25 June 2021. He made his debut for Newport on 7 August 2021 in the starting line-up for the 1-0 League Two win against Oldham Athletic. His contract at Newport was cancelled by mutual consent on 9 January 2022.

=== Arbroath ===
On 28 July 2023, following a successful trial period, Hylton joined Scottish Championship club Arbroath on a deal until January 2024. After a successful stint with the Lichties, Hylton left Arbroath following the completion of his contract.

=== Kauno Žalgiris ===
On 11 April 2024, Hylton joined Lithuanian A Lyga club Kauno Žalgiris. He has also featured for the club's B team in the second-tier, the I Lyga.

=== Hednesford Town ===
In October 2025, Hylton returned to England, joining Northern Premier League Premier Division club Hednesford Town.

== Personal life ==
Hylton is a keen supporter of Liverpool. His brother Jarrell Hylton, also played football for non-league sides; Redditch United, Bedworth United, Studley and Stratford Town.

== Honours ==
Hednesford Town

- Northern Premier League Play Offs: 2025-26

Individual

- Solihull Moors Goal of the Season: 2018-19

== Career statistics ==
As of 11 April 2024

Appearances and goals by club, season and competition
| Club | Season | League | | | National Cup | | League Cup | | Other | | Total | |
| Club | Season | Division | Apps | Goals | Apps | Goals | Apps | Goals | Apps | Goals | Apps | Goals |
|---|---|---|---|---|---|---|---|---|---|---|---|---|
| Swindon Town | 2014–15 | League One | 11 | 1 | 0 | 0 | 0 | 0 | 2 (Note: Appearance(s) in League One play-offs) | 0 | 13 | 1 |
| Swindon Town | 2015–16 | League One | 16 | 0 | 1 | 0 | 0 | 0 | 1 (Note: Appearance(s) in Football League Trophy) | 0 | 18 | 0 |
| Swindon Town | 2016–17 | League One | 12 | 0 | 0 | 0 | 1 | 0 | 0 | 0 | 15 | 0 |
| Swindon Town | Total | | 39 | 1 | 1 | 0 | 1 | 0 | 3 | 0 | 44 | 1 |
| Guiseley (loan) | 2016–17 | National League | 3 | 1 | 2 | 0 | — | | 0 | 0 | 5 | 1 |
| Solihull Moors | 2017–18 | National League | 27 | 3 | 3 | 0 | — | | 2 (Note: Appearance(s) in FA Trophy) | 1 | 32 | 4 |
| Solihull Moors | 2018–19 | National League | 42 | 12 | 2 | 0 | — | | 1 (Note: Appearance in the National League play-offs) | 0 | 45 | 12 |
| Solihull Moors | Total | | 69 | 15 | 5 | 0 | 0 | 0 | 3 | 1 | 77 | 16 |
| Motherwell | 2019–20 | Scottish Premiership | 28 | 2 | 3 | 0 | 5 | 2 | — | | 36 | 4 |
| Motherwell | 2020–21 | Scottish Premiership | 5 | 0 | 0 | 0 | 0 | 0 | 0 | 0 | 5 | 0 |
| Motherwell | Total | | 33 | 2 | 3 | 0 | 5 | 2 | 0 | 0 | 41 | 4 |
| Ross County | 2020–21 | Scottish Premiership | 18 | 1 | 1 | 0 | 4 | 0 | — | | 23 | 1 |
| Newport County | 2021–22 | League Two | 4 | 0 | 0 | 0 | 0 | 0 | 2 | 0 | 6 | 0 |
| Arbroath | 2023–24 | Scottish Championship | 17 | 6 | 1 | 0 | 1 | 0 | 2 (Note: Appearance(s) in Scottish Challenge Cup) | 0 | 21 | 6 |
| Career total | | | 180 | 25 | 11 | 0 | 11 | 2 | 10 | 1 | 212 | 28 |
