= Stefano Seedorf =

Dutch footballer (born 1982)

Personal information
- Full name: Stefano Maarten Seedorf
- Date of birth: 28 April 1982 (age 44)
- Place of birth: Zaanstad, Netherlands
- Height: 1.70 m (5 ft 7 in)
- Position: Midfielder

Youth career
- Hellas Sport
- 2000–2002: Ajax

Senior career*
Years	Team	Apps	(Gls)
2001–2004	Ajax	5	(0)
2003–2004	→ NAC Breda (loan)	29	(7)
2004–2006	Groningen	59	(8)
2007	Apollon Limassol	4	(0)
2007–2008	Veria	16	(2)
2008–2009	Den Bosch	26	(5)
2009–2012	Monza	44	(3)
2012	NAC Breda	0	(0)
2013	Alecrim		
- * Club domestic league appearances and goals

Stefano Maarten Seedorf (born 28 April 1982) is a Dutch former professional footballer who played as a midfielder. After retiring, he worked as a fitness coach.

== Career ==
=== Early career ===
Stefano Seedorf was born in Zaanstad. He started his playing career with amateur side Hellas Sport, but like his cousins he would soon be discovered by Ajax.

=== Ajax ===
After rising through the ranks with players such as Serginho Greene and Youssouf Hersi, he made his debut in the first team line-up on 30 April 2002, two days after his 20th birthday. After two years and five league matches, Stefano was sent away on a loan spell with NAC Breda.

=== After Ajax ===
At NAC Breda, Stefano made an immediate impact. He proliferated himself as a fast paced technical midfielder and scored 7 goals in 29 matches. Despite his successful performance with NAC, his contract with Ajax was not extended. In the summer of 2004, Seedorf was therefore transferred to Groningen.

In 2009–10, Stefano and his cousin Chedric left for the Italian team Monza.

In February 2013, Stefano joined Brazilian club Alecrim.

== Personal life ==
Stefano is the cousin of Clarence, Jürgen, Chedric, Rahmlee Seedorf and his uncle Johan Seedorf is his player agent.
