= Chedric Seedorf =

Dutch footballer (born 1983)

Personal information
- Full name: Chedric Seedorf
- Date of birth: 20 April 1983 (age 43)
- Place of birth: Naarden, Netherlands
- Height: 1.76 m (5 ft 9 1/2 in)
- Position: Midfielder

Youth career
- Ajax
- 1999–2000: Real Madrid
- 2000–2001: Internazionale

Senior career*
Years	Team	Apps	(Gls)
2001–2003	NAC	3	(0)
2005–2006	Legnano	0	(0)
2006–2007	Pizzighettone	2	(0)
2007	Oostende	0	(0)
2008	Cambuur Leeuwarden	1	(0)
2008–2009	Milan	0	(0)
2008–2009	→ Évian TGFC (loan)	1	(0)
2009	→ Haarlem (loan)	0	(0)
2009–2011	Monza	17	(1)

International career
1999–2000	Netherlands U-21		
- * Club domestic league appearances and goals as of 6 September 2012

Chedric Seedorf (born 20 April 1983 in Naarden) is a former Dutch footballer who played as a midfielder.

== Club career ==
Like his brothers Clarence and Jürgen and his cousin Stefano he is the product of the Ajax youth academy, but in 1999, his father and player agent Johan Seedorf forced a breach with the club due to irreconcilable differences with then technical director Hans Westerhof. Chedric was admitted to the cantera of Real Madrid, but when Clarence left Madrid for Inter Milan in 2000, Jurgen (briefly) and Chedric went with him.

Realizing that it would be difficult to break through into the senior squad of Inter, Jurgen (De Graafschap) and a little later Chedric would soon opt for a move back to the Netherlands with Eredivisie side NAC Breda. He made his debut in 2001, but did not manage to become a permanent fixture in the squad. His contract was therefore cancelled in 2003, after which he played amateur football for some time.

In August 2005, Chedric signed a contract with Italian Serie C2/A outfit Legnano, a club presided over by former A.C. Milan star, Marco Simone, a personal friend of Chedric. He also played for Serie C1/A club Pizzighettone. In June 2007, Seedorf signed for the Belgian coast team Oostende.

In August 2008, Chedric was loaned to Savoie 74 by A.C. Milan in 2-year contract. That deal ended in January 2009, after which he joined Haarlem.

In July 2009, he was sold to Monza.

== Personal life ==
Chedric is the younger brother of Clarence Seedorf, and also the cousin of Stefano Seedorf.
