= Jake Carroll =

Irish professional footballer

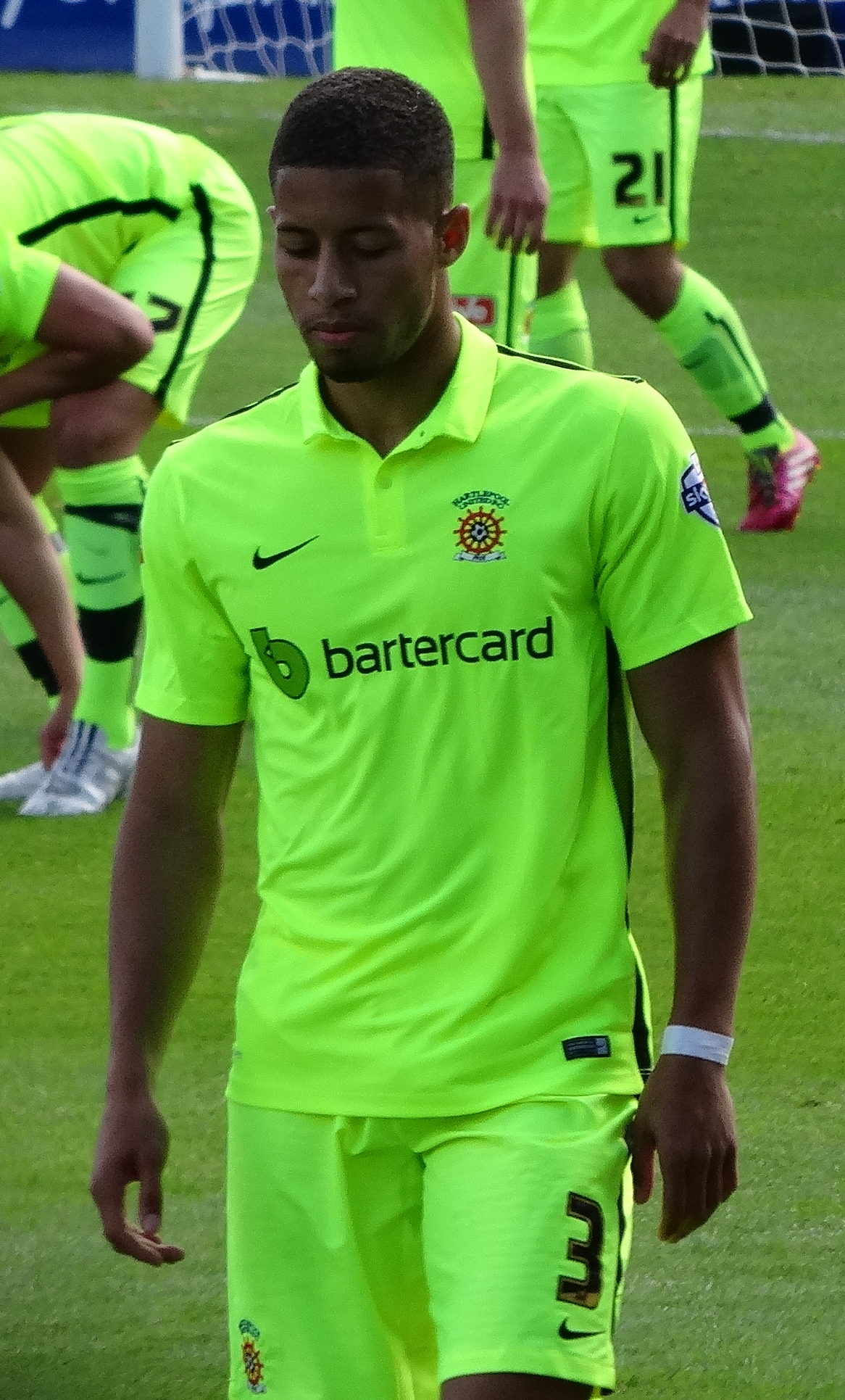
- Carroll playing for Hartlepool United in 2015

Personal information
- Full name: Jake Carroll
- Date of birth: 11 August 1991 (age 35)
- Place of birth: Dublin, Ireland
- Height: 1.84 m (6 ft 0 in)
- Position: Left-back

Youth career
- 1998–2008: Home Farm
- 2008–2009: Belvedere
- 2010–2011: St Patrick's Athletic

Senior career*
Years	Team	Apps	(Gls)
2011–2013	St Patrick's Athletic	33	(1)
2013–2015	Huddersfield Town	6	(0)
2014	→ Bury (loan)	6	(1)
2014–2015	→ Partick Thistle (loan)	10	(0)
2015–2017	Hartlepool United	62	(1)
2017–2019	Cambridge United	85	(0)
2019–2023	Motherwell	62	(2)
2024	Bohemians	9	(0)
Total		273	(5)

International career^{‡}
2010	Republic of Ireland U18	5	(0)
- * Club domestic league appearances and goals as of 18:46, 1 February 2025 (UTC) ‡ National team caps and goals as of 13:26, 4 May 2014 (UTC)

Jake Carroll (born 11 August 1991) is an Irish former professional footballer who played as a left-back. He began his career with League of Ireland club St Patrick's Athletic, before moving to the UK, where he played for English sides Huddersfield Town, Bury, Hartlepool United and Cambridge United as well as Scottish sides Partick Thistle and Motherwell before returning to Ireland for a short spell with Bohemians.

== Club career ==
=== Early career ===
Carroll was raised in Lucan, Dublin and started playing football with junior club, Home Farm in 1998 and he later moved to Belvedere, where he won the FAI Under-17 Cup at Tolka Park. While at Belvedere he played in a side that included fellow future League of Ireland players Neil Harney, Stephen Traynor, David Lodola, Craig Sexton, Paul Corry, Gary Burke, David O'Connor, Tom O'Halloran, Garvan Broughnall, Sean Skelly and future Pats' teammate Chris Forrester.

Carroll became the first player of the partnership between NUI Maynooth and St Patrick's Athletic was signed up to the St Pat's under 20's team by then first-team manager Pete Mahon in 2010.

=== St Patrick's Athletic ===
Carroll was then signed up for the first team for the 2011 season, given the number 19 shirt. Carroll's first game for the senior team was a 3–0 win in a friendly away to Drogheda United at Hunky Dorys Park on 13 February 2011 and his first competitive game for the first team was at home to Dublin rivals Shamrock Rovers in the League Cup, a game in which the Saints won 3–1 on penalties after the scores were level at 1–1 after 120 minutes. His first league game came in a 5–2 win over Galway United in which Carroll provided a wonderful assist for Daryl Kavanagh to score. Carroll's first goal for St Pat's came in an FAI Cup third-round tie with Crumlin United when he curled in a superb free-kick to make it 3–0, he capped a great night for him by winning the Man of the Match award. After his performances, he was highly praised throughout the national media, in newspapers, on television and on the internet. Carroll had his first taste of Europa League action when he came on for the final 18 minutes of the third qualifying round tie away to FC Karpaty Lviv of Ukraine. Carroll was part of the Pats' side that won the 2010–11 Leinster Senior Cup against Dublin rivals Bohemians, ending the club's trophy drought that went back to 2003. The left back won the Man of the Match award after a great display in a 2–0 win at Dalymount Park. He only managed 7 appearances in the league and 14 in all competitions in 2011 due to the excellent form of first choice left-back Ian Bermingham.

Carroll was given the 3 shirt by newly appointed manager Liam Buckley when he signed a new two-year contract to keep him at the club until the end of the 2013 season, on 18 December 2011. Carroll started in all of the Saints pre-season games and featured at a new attacking position of left wing as well as his familiar left back role. He provided the assist for Chris Forrester's wonder goal against Phoenix in a 4–0 win in the Leinster Senior Cup at Richmond Park. He played in yet another new role for the team when he played as a center midfielder against U.C.D in the EA Sports Cup having previously played there for his NUI Maynooth college team. Carroll impressed in his sides Leinster Senior Cup Quarter Final defeat away to Shamrock Rovers at Tallaght Stadium. This earned him his first league appearance of the season at home to Cork City and played well, putting in some very good crosses and nearly scoring. It was a sense of Dé-ja-vu for Carroll when Pats once again played Crumlin United in the FAI Cup Second Round. Just like the previous season, the Saints won 3–0 with Carroll scoring and getting the FAI Ford Man of the Match award, this time for his excellent play at centre midfield and his cool finish after 12 minutes. Carroll's first start in a Dublin derby in the league came within the three derby he played in during seven days, when he started at centre-midfield vs Bohemians in a 2–1 win. The other two games included the 120 minutes of the EA Sports Cup Quarter-final vs. Shamrock Rovers where he started at his familiar left back role, and the third was when he came on at half time for Chris Forrester at half time in the 1–0 win over Northside rivals Shelbourne. Carroll played three times in the Saints 2012 Europa League, the first was away to Íþróttabandalag Vestmannaeyja at the Hásteinsvöllur in Iceland when he played a big part in getting Pats through after extra-time, holding the ball up and protecting the back four. The other two were against German giants Hannover 96, one at the Tallaght Stadium and the other in front of 25,000 at the AWD-Arena. Carroll scored his first ever League of Ireland goal when he scored the winner in a 2–1 Dublin derby win over Shamrock Rovers on 25 September 2012. Carroll started the 2012 FAI Cup Final against Derry City on 4 November at the Aviva Stadium but was substituted off early in the game due to injury as the Saints agonisingly lost 3–2 in extra-time.

Carroll's performances in the holding midfielder role impressed supporters and manager Liam Buckley, making him one of the favourites along with Shane McFaul and Greg Bolger to fill the void left by James Chambers who departed to fierce rivals Shamrock Rovers during the transfer window. Carroll made his 50th appearance for St Patrick's Athletic playing at centre back in a 1–0 win away to Limerick at Thomond Park on 30 March 2013. He performed well at centre back and kept club captain Conor Kenna out of the team, starting there in the 1–0 wins away to Bray Wanderers and UCD. On 26 April, it was announced that Carroll had signed a contract to join Huddersfield Town from July 2013 for an undisclosed fee believed to be in the reign of €150,000. His next appearance came nearly a month after his move was secured, on 20 May 2013 when he played 120 minutes in a 3–2 win after extra-time away to Salthill Devon in the League Cup. Carroll's final two appearances for St Patrick's Athletic came on 1 and 4 June 2013 when he came on from the bench in a 4–0 home win over UCD in the FAI Cup and 120 minutes in a 2–0 win after extra-time over Longford Town in the Leinster Senior Cup Quarter Final, also at Richmond Park. Carroll left Pats with 58 appearances in all competitions over 3 seasons, scoring 3 goals. At the end of the 2013 season, St Patrick's Athletic awarded Carroll a League of Ireland medal for his contribution in the first half of the season towards winning the 2013 League of Ireland, the club's ninth league triumph.

=== Huddersfield Town ===
On 26 April 2013, it was announced that Carroll had signed for the English Championship side Huddersfield Town for an undisclosed fee believed to be in the region of €150,000, completing the move in July. Carroll was given the number 25 shirt for the season. Carroll revealed that Manager Mark Robins persuaded Carroll to join the club and expect him to make a breakthrough in the first team.

He made his début in the 2–1 League Cup victory over Bradford City on 6 August, then made his first league start four days later in the 1–1 draw with Queens Park Rangers. Then on 24 August, Carroll won the penalty after being brought down and then it was successfully converted.

On 19 February 2014, Carroll joined League Two side Bury on a one-month loan. He scored his first goal in England in the 4–1 win over Mansfield Town a week later, before returning a month later.

On 29 August 2014, Carroll joined Scottish Premiership side Partick Thistle on loan until January 2015. The next day, on 30 August 2014, Carroll made his début for the club, in a 2–0 loss against Aberdeen.

=== Hartlepool United ===
On 12 June 2015, it was announced that Carroll would sign for League Two club Hartlepool United, on a free transfer, effective on 1 July 2015. He scored his first goal for the club on 12 March 2016, in a 3–1 victory over Dagenham & Redbridge at Victoria Park. In his first season, Carroll made 41 appearances in league football, and an additional four appearances in the FA Cup.

In his second season playing for the club, Carroll recorded 21 appearances in league football, two appearances in the FA Cup, and an appearance in the Football League Cup. Carroll opted to leave the club in January 2017.

=== Cambridge United ===
On 12 January 2017, Carroll signed for fellow League Two club Cambridge United, for an undisclosed fee.

=== Motherwell ===
On 29 April 2019, Carroll signed a pre-contract agreement to join Motherwell ahead of the 2019–20 season, on a two-year deal. Carroll played regularly for Motherwell during the 2019–20 season, making 28 appearances and scoring two goals. He suffered an achilles tendon injury in a Scottish Cup tie with St Mirren in February 2020 that was expected to prevent him from playing for the rest of the season. On 21 January 2021, Carroll signed a new two-and-a-half-year deal at Motherwell. On 31 July 2022, in the first league game of the season, Carroll picked up a knee injury that would rule him out for the entirety of the 2022–23 season. It was announced on 14 June 2023 that Carroll would be departing the club following the end of his contract, after 77 appearances and 2 goals in all competitions during his 4 seasons at the club.

=== Bohemians ===
On 16 May 2024, Carroll signed for League of Ireland Premier Division club Bohemians after 11 months without a club. He made 9 appearances for the club before retiring from professional football at the end of the season.

== International career ==
Carroll was called up the Republic of Ireland Under 18 Schools team after he impressed coaches with his performances for his school team Confey College from Leixlip. Carroll made his debut against Australia in a friendly when he came on from the bench in the 69th minute. He then started in the Carnegie Centenary Shield against Northern Ireland in a 1–0 loss.

== Career statistics ==
As of match played 1 November 2024

Appearances and goals by club, season and competition
Club	Season	League			National Cup		League Cup		Europe		Other		Total	
Club	Season	Division	Apps	Goals	Apps	Goals	Apps	Goals	Apps	Goals	Apps	Goals	Apps	Goals
St Patrick's Athletic	2011	LOI Premier Division	7	0	1	1	1	0	1 (Note: Appearances in UEFA Europa League)	0	2 (Note: Appearances in Leinster Senior Cup)	0	12	1
St Patrick's Athletic	2012	LOI Premier Division	19	1	5	1	2	0	3	0	3 (Note: Two appearances in Leinster Senior Cup and one appearance in the Setanta Sports Cup)	0	32	2
St Patrick's Athletic	2013	LOI Premier Division	7	0	1	0	1	0	0	0	4 (Note: Two appearances in Leinster Senior Cup and two appearances in the Setanta Sports Cup)	0	13	0
St Patrick's Athletic	Total		33	1	7	2	4	0	4	0	9	0	56	3
Huddersfield Town	2013–14	Championship	4	0	0	0	3	0	—		—		7	0
Huddersfield Town	2014–15	Championship	2	0	0	0	0	0	—		—		2	0
Huddersfield Town	Total		6	0	0	0	3	0	—		—		9	0
Bury (loan)	2013–14	League Two	6	1	0	0	0	0	—		0	0	6	1
Partick Thistle (loan)	2014–15	Scottish Premiership	10	0	1	0	2	0	—		—		13	0
Hartlepool United	2015–16	League Two	41	1	4	0	2	0	—		1 (Note: Appearance in Football League Trophy)	0	48	1
Hartlepool United	2016–17	League Two	21	0	2	0	1	0	—		1 (Note: Appearance(s) in EFL Trophy)	0	25	0
Hartlepool United	Total		62	1	6	0	3	0	—		2	0	73	1
Cambridge United	2016–17	League Two	20	0	0	0	0	0	—		0	0	20	0
Cambridge United	2017–18	League Two	33	0	2	0	1	0	—		3	0	39	0
Cambridge United	2018–19	League Two	32	0	1	0	1	0	—		2	0	36	0
Cambridge United	Total		85	0	3	0	2	0	—		5	0	95	0
Motherwell	2019–20	Scottish Premiership	21	2	3	0	3	0	—		1 (Note: Appearance as an over-age player for Motherwell under-21s in the Scottish Challenge Cup in which age-restricted sides from the Scottish Premiership clubs compete against senior clubs)	0	28	2
Motherwell	2020–21	Scottish Premiership	15	0	0	0	0	0	0	0	—		15	0
Motherwell	2021–22	Scottish Premiership	25	0	2	0	4	0	—		—		31	0
Motherwell	2022–23	Scottish Premiership	1	0	0	0	0	0	2 (Note: Appearances in UEFA Europa Conference League)	0	—		3	0
Motherwell	Total		62	2	5	0	7	0	2	0	1	0	77	2
Bohemians	2024	LOI Premier Division	9	0	0	0	—		—		—		9	0
Career total			273	5	22	2	21	0	6	0	17	0	339	7

== Honours ==
St Patrick's Athletic

- League of Ireland Premier Division: 2013
- Leinster Senior Cup: 2011
