= David Devine (footballer) =

Scottish footballer (born 2001)

Personal information
- Date of birth: 20 June 2001 (age 25)
- Place of birth: Wishaw, Scotland
- Height: 1.90 m (6 ft 3 in)
- Position: Defender

Team information
- Current team: Alloa Athletic
- Number: 23

Youth career
- Motherwell

Senior career*
Years	Team	Apps	(Gls)
2018–2023	Motherwell	1	(0)
2019–2020	→ Queen of the South (loan)	5	(0)
2021	→ East Fife (loan)	0	(0)
2022–2023	→ Alloa Athletic (loan)	8	(0)
2023–	Alloa Athletic	48	(4)
- * Club domestic league appearances and goals as of 4 May 2026

David Devine (born 20 June 2001) is a Scottish professional footballer who plays as a defender for Alloa Athletic.

== Club career ==
On 18 May 2019, Devine debuted for Motherwell as a substitute in a 3–2 home win versus Livingston. On 9 July 2019, he signed a new contract keeping him at the club until 2021.

On 23 January 2020, Devine was loaned out to Dumfries club Queen of the South until 31 May 2020.

In June 2021, Devine signed a new two-contract with Motherwell. On 30 September 2021, he moved on loan to East Fife until the end of the season. However an injury with the Methil outfit meant that he was unable to play during the 2021–22 season.

Devine was loaned to Alloa Athletic on 1 September 2022.

On 15 June 2023, Devine signed permanently with Alloa Athletic following his release by Motherwell.

== Career statistics ==
As of 25 October 2021

Club	Season	League			Cup		League Cup		Other		Total	
Club	Season	Division	Apps	Goals	Apps	Goals	Apps	Goals	Apps	Goals	Apps	Goals
Motherwell	2018–19	Scottish Premiership	1	0	0	0	0	0	0	0	1	0
Motherwell	2019–20	Scottish Premiership	0	0	0	0	0	0	2 (Note: Appearances for Motherwell under-21s in the Scottish Challenge Cup in which age-restricted sides from the Scottish Premiership clubs compete against senior clubs)	0	2	0
Motherwell	2020–21	Scottish Premiership	0	0	0	0	0	0	0	0	0	0
Motherwell	2021–22	Scottish Premiership	0	0	0	0	0	0	0	0	0	0
Motherwell	Total		1	0	0	0	0	0	2	0	3	0
Queen of the South (loan)	2019–20	Scottish Championship	5	0	0	0	0	0	0	0	5	0
East Fife (loan)	2021–22	Scottish League One	0	0	0	0	0	0	0	0	0	0
Career total			6	0	0	0	0	0	2	0	8	0
