= James Scott (footballer, born 2000) =

Scottish association football player

Personal information
- Full name: James Ryan Scott
- Date of birth: 30 August 2000 (age 26)
- Place of birth: Glasgow, Scotland
- Height: 1.89 m (6 ft 2 in)
- Position: Forward

Team information
- Current team: Sha Tin
- Number: 9

Youth career
- 2013–2017: Motherwell

Senior career*
Years	Team	Apps	(Gls)
2017–2020	Motherwell	36	(4)
2020–2023	Hull City	26	(2)
2021–2022	→ Hibernian (loan)	16	(4)
2023–2024	Exeter City	36	(3)
2024	→ St Mirren (loan)	11	(1)
2024–2026	St Mirren	13	(0)
2025–2026	→ Ross County (loan)	22	(0)
2026–	Sha Tin	8	(3)

International career^{‡}
2019–2021	Scotland U21	3	(0)
- * Club domestic league appearances and goals as of 17:22, 22 November 2026 (UTC) ‡ National team caps and goals as of 13:50, 23 July 2023 (UTC)

James Ryan Scott (born 30 August 2000) is a Scottish professional footballer who currently plays as a forward for Hong Kong Premier League club Sha Tin.

== Club career ==
=== Motherwell ===
Scott made his senior debut for Motherwell on 21 April 2018, as a late substitute away to Ross County in the Scottish Premiership. He had already played for the club's under-20 team in the Scottish Challenge Cup, making his first appearances aged 15.

On 15 February 2019, he signed a new contract, keeping him at Motherwell until 2022. He started his first game on 24 February, in a 4–1 defeat against Celtic. During that match Scott failed to return the ball to the opposition after an injured player had received treatment, and instead took a shot that led to Motherwell's goal. On 27 April 2019, Scott scored his first senior goal in Motherwell's 4–3 win at home to Dundee.

By the end of January, Scott had scored six goals in 28 appearances for Motherwell during the 2019–20 season. Motherwell accepted an offer from Hull City for Scott on 31 January 2020.

=== Hull City ===
Scott signed a three-and-a-half-year contract with Hull City on 31 January 2020, with the club also having the option of extending the contract by one year. During his first training session with Hull, Scott suffered an ankle injury that was expected to prevent him from playing for the rest of the 2019–20 season.

He made his debut for Hull on 20 June 2020, against Charlton Athletic. On 27 June 2020, Scott scored his first goal for Hull City with a well placed header against Birmingham in a 3–3 draw.

==== Hibernian (loan) ====
On 20 August 2021, Scott returned to Scotland to join Hibernian on loan for the duration of the 2021–22 season. Scott made his debut for Hibernian two days later in a 2–2 draw with Dundee. On 15 May 2022, the final day of the Scottish Premiership campaign, Scott netted a hat trick in a 4–0 win over St Johnstone. He returned to Hull at the end of the season.

=== Exeter City ===
On 31 January 2023, Scott was released by Hull City after spending two-years at the club and making 36 appearances in all competitions for the Tigers. He was subsequently signed by Exeter City on an 18-month permanent contract, rejoining former Hibernian assistant manager Gary Caldwell. On 25 March 2023, Scott scored the fourth goal in a comprehensive 5–0 home victory over Accrington Stanley; his first goal for the Grecians.

=== St Mirren ===
On 24 January 2024, Scott joined Scottish Premiership club St Mirren on loan for the remainder of the season, agreeing to sign on a permanent two-year deal at the end of his loan.

=== Sha Tin ===
On 8 August 2026, Scott moved abroad and joined Hong Kong Premier League club Sha Tin.

== International career ==
In August 2019, Scott was called into the Scotland under-21 squad, for the European under-21 Championship qualifiers against San Marino and Croatia, and he went on to make his debut as a substitute against San Marino.

== Career statistics ==
As of 20 January 2024

Appearances and goals by club, season and competition
Club	Season	League			Scottish Cup		League Cup		Other		Total	
Club	Season	Division	Apps	Goals	Apps	Goals	Apps	Goals	Apps	Goals	Apps	Goals
Motherwell	2016–17	Scottish Premiership	0	0	0	0	0	0	0 (Note: Also made 2 appearances (0 goals) for Motherwell under-20s in the Scottish Challenge Cup.)	0	0	0
Motherwell	2017–18	Scottish Premiership	2	0	0	0	0	0	0	0	2	0
Motherwell	2018–19	Scottish Premiership	12	1	0	0	0	0	0 (Note: Also made 4 appearances (0 goals) for Motherwell under-21s in the Scottish Challenge Cup.)	0	12	1
Motherwell	2019–20	Scottish Premiership	22	3	1	0	5	3	0	0	28	6
Motherwell	Total		36	4	1	0	5	3	0	0	42	7
Hull City	2019–20	Championship	7	1	0	0	0	0	0	0	7	1
Hull City	2020–21	EFL League One	18	1	2	0	2	0	5 (Note: Appearance(s) in the EFL Trophy)	2	27	3
Hull City	2021–22	Championship	1	0	0	0	1	0	0	0	2	0
Hull City	Total		26	2	2	0	3	0	5	2	36	4
Hibernian (loan)	2021–22	Scottish Premiership	16	4	2	0	1	0	0	0	19	4
Exeter City	2022–23	EFL League One	15	1	0	0	0	0	0	0	15	1
Exeter City	2023–24	EFL League One	21	2	1	0	3	1	3	0	28	3
Exeter City	Total		36	3	1	0	3	1	3	0	43	4
St Mirren F.C. (loan)	2023–24	Scottish Premiership	11	1	1	0	0	0	0	0	12	1
Career total			114	13	6	0	12	4	8 (Note: Also made a total of 8 appearances (0 goals) for Motherwell under-20s/under-21s in the Scottish Challenge Cup, in which age-restricted teams from the SPFL Premiership clubs compete against senior clubs.)	2	140	19

== Honours ==
Hull City

- EFL League One: 2020–21
