= Liam Donnelly (footballer) =

Northern Irish footballer (born 1996)

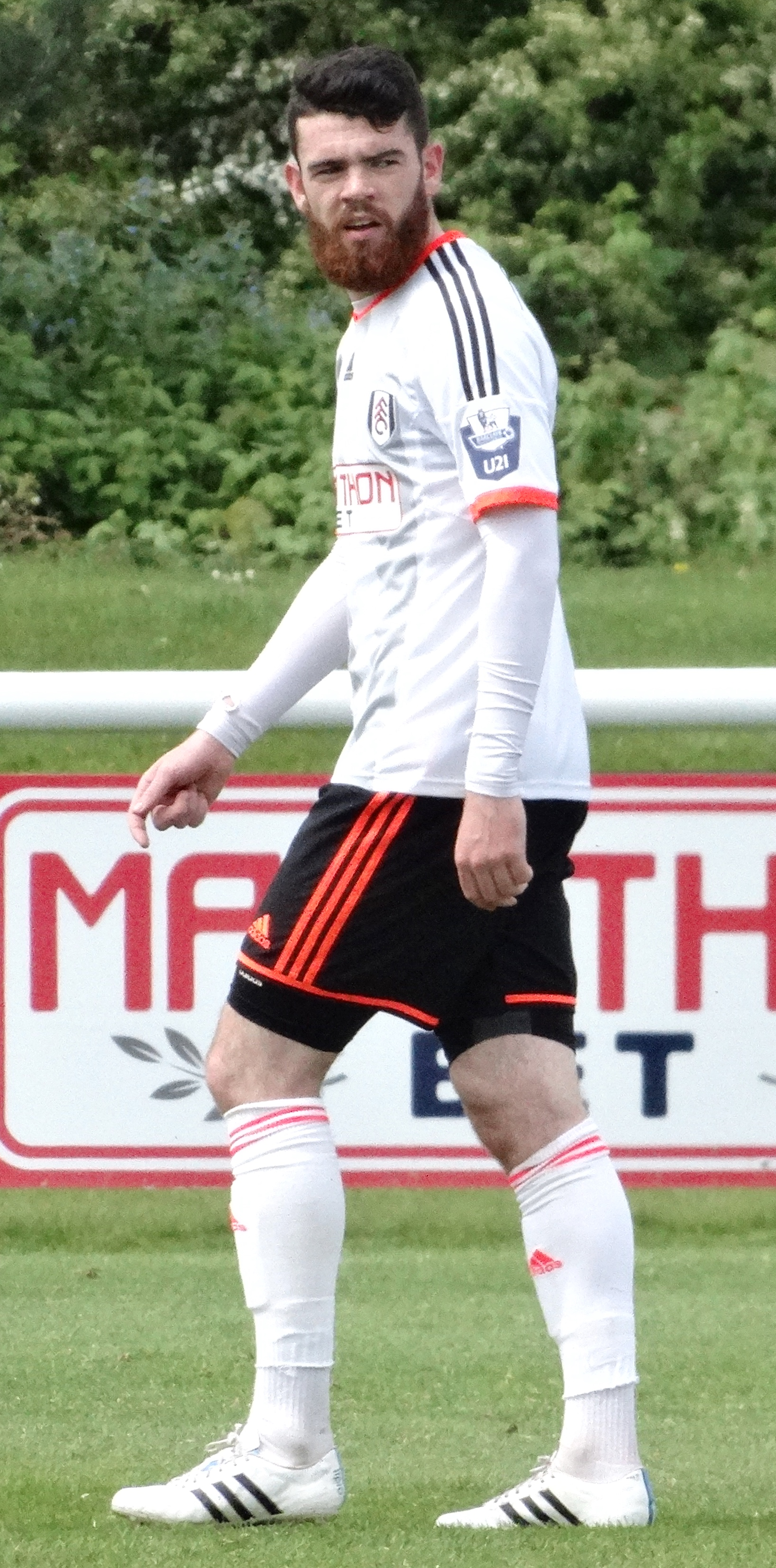
- Donnelly playing for Fulham U21s in 2015

Personal information
- Full name: Liam Francis Peadar Donnelly
- Date of birth: 7 March 1996 (age 30)
- Place of birth: Dungannon, Northern Ireland
- Height: 1.80 m (5 ft 11 in)
- Positions: Centre-back; right-back; midfielder

Team information
- Current team: St Mirren
- Number: 4

Youth career
- Dungannon Swifts
- 2012–2014: Fulham

Senior career*
| Years | Team | Apps | (Gls) |
| 2011–2012 | Dungannon Swifts | 7 | (0) |
| 2012–2016 | Fulham | 0 | (0) |
| 2015 | → Crawley Town (loan) | 10 | (0) |
| 2016–2018 | Hartlepool United | 60 | (3) |
| 2018–2022 | Motherwell | 53 | (8) |
| 2022–2025 | Kilmarnock | 74 | (3) |
| 2025– | St Mirren | 17 | (1) |

International career^{‡}
| | Northern Ireland U16 | 3 | (1) |
| | Northern Ireland U17 | 14 | (1) |
| 2012–2018 | Northern Ireland U21 | 24 | (5) |
| 2014– | Northern Ireland | 4 | (0) |
- * Club domestic league appearances and goals as of 14:48, 20 May 2026 ‡ National team caps and goals as of 14:48, 20 May 2026 (UTC)

Liam Francis Peadar Donnelly (born 7 March 1996) is a Northern Irish professional footballer who plays as a midfielder for Scottish Premiership club St Mirren.

Donnelly, who can also play as a defender, has previously played for Dungannon Swifts, Fulham, Crawley Town, Hartlepool United, Motherwell and Kilmarnock. He has also represented Northern Ireland internationally.

== Club career ==
=== Fulham ===
Donnelly signed for Fulham as a youngster from IFA Premiership club Dungannon Swifts. Donnelly captained Fulham to the 2014 FA Youth Cup final.

On 31 July 2015, Donnelly signed for Crawley Town on a one-month youth loan. The loan was then extended until January 2016, however he was recalled early by Fulham in October.

=== Hartlepool United ===
On 19 August 2016, Donnelly signed for Hartlepool United, following his release from Fulham.

=== Motherwell ===
On 7 June 2018, Motherwell announced the signing of Donnelly on an initial two-year contract from Hartlepool United for an undisclosed fee. He scored his first goal for the club in a 3–2 victory against Livingston on the final day of the season.

At the beginning of the 2019–20 season, Donnelly moved from defence into midfield, and went on to score four goals in three games in the Scottish League Cup group stages, against Queen of the South, Greenock Morton and Annan Athletic. Then in the league, he scored four goals in the opening four matches, with two against Celtic and penalties against Hamilton Academical and Hibernian. In October 2019, Donnelly was rewarded for his early season form as he signed an extension to his contract at Fir Park, to run until summer 2022.

In the opening game of the 2020–21 season, Donnelly missed a penalty as Motherwell lost 1–0 away to Ross County. Following that match he picked up a knee injury in training which was initially expected to keep him out for two months, however he then required surgery on the injury, ruling him out until after the new year.

Donnelly made his return from injury on 14 July 2021, as a substitute in a 1–0 win away to Queen's Park in a Scottish League Cup group stage match. He was released by Motherwell at the end of the 2021–22 season.

=== Kilmarnock ===
On 5 July 2022, Donnelly signed a one-year contract with Kilmarnock. On 1 August 2023, he signed a new two-year contract with Kilmarnock.

=== St Mirren ===
Donnelly signed a two-year contract with St Mirren in June 2025.

== International career ==
Donnelly made his senior Northern Ireland debut on 4 June 2014 against Chile, coming on as a substitute in the 89th minute.

On 11 September 2018, Donnelly made his 22nd appearance for Northern Ireland's under-21s in a 2–1 win away to Spain, a match in which he scored from a penalty, and in doing so became the nation's record cap holder at that level. He eventually finished his time with the under-21 side with 24 caps.

Donnelly was recalled to the senior squad in August 2019, ahead of a friendly against Luxembourg and a Euro 2020 qualifier against Germany. He came on as a substitute against Luxembourg on 5 September, earning his second cap, five years after his first.

== Career statistics ==
As of match played 20 May 2023

| Club | Season | League | | | National Cup | | League Cup | | Other | | Total | |
| Club | Season | Division | Apps | Goals | Apps | Goals | Apps | Goals | Apps | Goals | Apps | Goals |
|---|---|---|---|---|---|---|---|---|---|---|---|---|
| Dungannon Swifts | 2011–12 | IFA Premiership | 7 | 0 | 0 | 0 | 0 | 0 | 0 | 0 | 7 | 0 |
| Fulham | 2012–13 | Premier League | 0 | 0 | 0 | 0 | 0 | 0 | 0 | 0 | 0 | 0 |
| Fulham | 2013–14 | Premier League | 0 | 0 | 0 | 0 | 0 | 0 | 0 | 0 | 0 | 0 |
| Fulham | 2014–15 | Championship | 0 | 0 | 0 | 0 | 0 | 0 | 0 | 0 | 0 | 0 |
| Fulham | 2015–16 | Championship | 0 | 0 | 0 | 0 | 0 | 0 | 0 | 0 | 0 | 0 |
| Fulham | Total | | 0 | 0 | 0 | 0 | 0 | 0 | 0 | 0 | 0 | 0 |
| Crawley Town (loan) | 2015–16 | League Two | 10 | 0 | 0 | 0 | 1 | 0 | 1 (Note: Appearance(s) in the Football League Trophy) | 0 | 12 | 0 |
| Hartlepool United | 2016–17 | League Two | 32 | 0 | 0 | 0 | 0 | 0 | 1 (Note: Appearance(s) in the EFL Trophy) | 0 | 33 | 0 |
| Hartlepool United | 2017–18 | National League | 28 | 3 | 1 | 0 | 0 | 0 | 1 (Note: Appearance(s) in the FA Trophy) | 0 | 30 | 3 |
| Hartlepool United | Total | | 60 | 3 | 1 | 0 | 0 | 0 | 2 | 0 | 63 | 3 |
| Motherwell | 2018–19 | Scottish Premiership | 7 | 1 | 0 | 0 | 4 | 0 | 0 | 0 | 11 | 1 |
| Motherwell | 2019–20 | Scottish Premiership | 22 | 7 | 3 | 0 | 4 | 4 | 0 | 0 | 29 | 11 |
| Motherwell | 2020–21 | Scottish Premiership | 1 | 0 | 0 | 0 | 0 | 0 | 0 | 0 | 1 | 0 |
| Motherwell | 2021–22 | Scottish Premiership | 23 | 0 | 3 | 1 | 4 | 0 | 0 | 0 | 30 | 1 |
| Motherwell | Total | | 53 | 8 | 6 | 1 | 12 | 4 | 0 | 0 | 71 | 13 |
| Kilmarnock | 2022–23 | Scottish Premiership | 22 | 2 | 1 | 0 | 4 | 1 | 0 | 0 | 27 | 3 |
| Kilmarnock | 2023–24 | Scottish Premiership | 27 | 0 | 3 | 0 | 1 | 0 | 0 | 0 | 31 | 0 |
| Kilmarnock | 2024–25 | Scottish Premiership | 25 | 1 | 1 | 0 | 1 | 0 | 6 | 0 | 33 | 1 |
| Kilmarnock | Total | | 74 | 3 | 5 | 0 | 6 | 1 | 6 | 0 | 91 | 4 |
| St Mirren | 2025–26 | Scottish Premiership | 17 | 1 | 2 | 0 | 2 | 0 | 0 | 0 | 21 | 1 |
| Career total | | | 221 | 15 | 14 | 1 | 21 | 5 | 9 | 0 | 265 | 21 |
