= Christy Manzinga =

Footballer (born 1995)

Personal information
- Date of birth: 31 January 1995 (age 31)
- Place of birth: Saint-Germain-en-Laye, France
- Height: 1.84 m (6 ft 0 in)
- Position: Striker

Team information
- Current team: Charlotte Independence
- Number: 9

Youth career
- 2008–2012: Paris Saint-Germain

Senior career*
Years	Team	Apps	(Gls)
2012–2013	Lorient	0	(0)
2013–2015	Angers II	26	(2)
2017–2019	Sporting Châtelet	45	(10)
2019–2020	Motherwell	6	(1)
2020–2022	Linfield	41	(19)
2022–2023	Zalaegerszeg	14	(1)
2023–2024	Seongnam FC	38	(8)
2025	Bnei Yehuda	17	(5)
2026–	Charlotte Independence	21	(3)

International career
- DR Congo U20
- * Club domestic league appearances and goals as of 14:56, 31 October 2026 (UTC)

Christy Manzinga (born 31 January 1995) is a professional footballer who plays for USL League One club Charlotte Independence, as a striker. Born in France, he has represented DR Congo at youth international level.

== Club career ==
Born in Saint-Germain-en-Laye, Manzinga began his career with Paris Saint-Germain at the age of 13. He then played for Lorient, Angers II and Sporting Châtelet, before signing with Scottish club Motherwell in July 2019, following a trial.

On 30 November 2019, Manzinga scored a goal on his Motherwell debut to round off a 4–0 win against St. Johnstone. On 31 May 2020, Motherwell confirmed that Manzinga was leaving the club at the end of his contract.

On 1 August 2020, he signed for Northern Irish club Linfield, on a two-year contract. He left the club in June 2022. Later that month he signed for Hungarian club Zalaegerszegi TE.

On 21 March 2023, he joined Seongnam FC of South Korean K League 2.

After playing for Bnei Yehuda, in March 2026 he signed for Charlotte Independence.

== International career ==
Manzinga has represented DR Congo at under-20 level.

== Career statistics ==
As of 18 April 2022

Appearances and goals by club, season and competition
Club	Season	League			National Cup		League Cup		Other		Total	
Club	Season	Division	Apps	Goals	Apps	Goals	Apps	Goals	Apps	Goals	Apps	Goals
Angers II	2013–14	Championnat National 3	9	1	0	0	—		—		9	1
Angers II	2014–15	Championnat National 3	17	1	0	0	—		—		17	1
Angers II	Total		26	2	0	0	0	0	0	0	26	2
Sporting Châtelet	2017–18	Belgian First Amateur Division	23	5	0	0	—		—		23	5
Sporting Châtelet	2018–19	Belgian First Amateur Division	22	5	0	0	—		—		22	5
Sporting Châtelet	Total		45	10	0	0	0	0	0	0	45	10
Motherwell	2019–20	Scottish Premiership	6	1	1	0	0	0	—		7	1
Linfield	2020–21	NIFL Premiership	15	2	3	0	0	0	3 (Note: 2 appearances and 1 goal in the UEFA Champions League; 1 appearance in the UEFA Europa League.)	1	21	3
Linfield	2021–22	NIFL Premiership	26	17	1	0	2	1	6 (Note: 2 appearances and 1 goal in the UEFA Champions League; 4 appearances and 1 goal in the UEFA Europa League.)	2	35	20
Linfield	Total		41	19	4	0	2	1	9	3	56	23
Career total			118	32	5	0	2	1	9	3	134	36

== Honours ==
Linfield

- NIFL Premiership: 2020–21
- Irish Cup: 2020–21
