= Sherwin Seedorf =

Dutch professional footballer (born 1998)

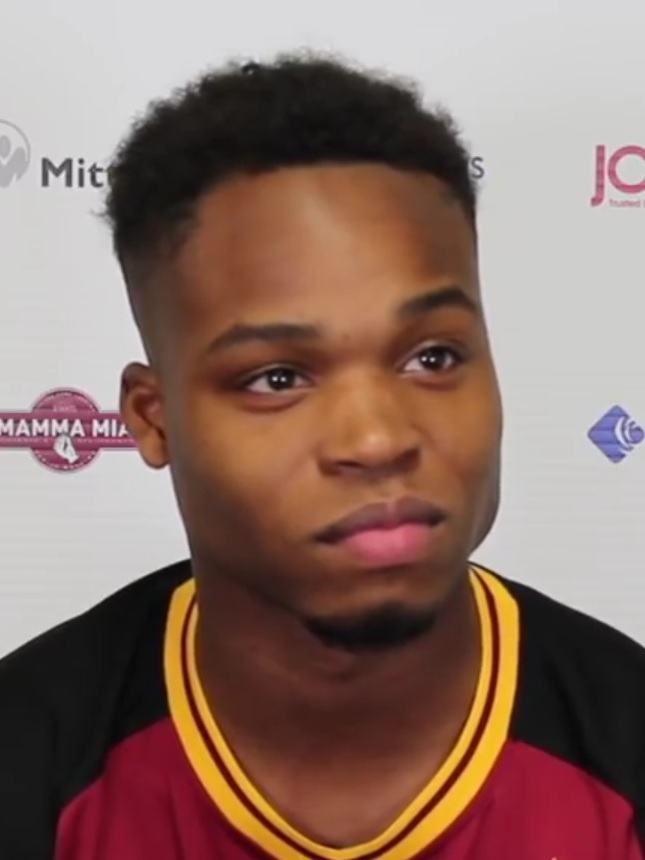
- Seedorf in June 2018

Personal information
- Full name: Sherwin Dandery Seedorf
- Date of birth: 17 March 1998 (age 28)
- Place of birth: Rotterdam, Netherlands
- Height: 1.75 m (5 ft 9 in)
- Position: Winger

Team information
- Current team: Visakha
- Number: 9

Youth career
- Excelsior
- NAC Breda
- 2009–2016: Feyenoord
- 2016–2017: Nike Academy
- 2017–2018: Wolverhampton Wanderers

Senior career*
Years	Team	Apps	(Gls)
2018–2019	Wolverhampton Wanderers	0	(0)
2018–2019	→ Bradford City (loan)	6	(0)
2019	→ FC Jumilla (loan)	9	(0)
2019–2021	Motherwell	32	(2)
2024	Länk Vilaverdense	14	(0)
2024–2025	Velež Nevesinje	12	(0)
2025	Enosis Neon Paralimni	12	(0)
2025	Banga	16	(5)
2026	Al-Wehdat	11	(3)
2026–	Visakha	2	(1)
- * Club domestic league appearances and goals as of 14 September 2026

Sherwin Dandery Seedorf (born 17 March 1998) is a Dutch professional footballer who plays as a winger for Cambodian Premier League club Visakha.

== Early and personal life ==
Seedorf was born in Rotterdam. He is distantly related to Clarence Seedorf.

== Career ==
After beginning his career with Excelsior and NAC Breda, Seedorf spent seven years with Feyenoord, and later played for Nike Academy before signing for Wolverhampton Wanderers in January 2017. He signed on loan for Bradford City in June 2018. He moved on loan to Spanish club FC Jumilla in January 2019.

In July 2019 he moved to Scottish club Motherwell, signing a two-year contract. On his debut for Motherwell, he scored his first career goal, in a 3–0 win away to Queen of the South in the Scottish League Cup group stages. His first league goal came on 31 August 2019, in a 3–0 win at home against Hibernian, and he scored again in the following match, away to Heart of Midlothian. He was released by the club at the end of the 2020–21 season. Seedorf was taken on trial by Czech top flight club Banik Ostrava during the summer of 2021 but was unsuccessful and was not offered a contract.

In January 2024, after two and a half years without a club, Seedorf joined Liga Portugal 2 side Länk Vilaverdense.

He signed for Bosnian club Velež Nevesinje in September 2024, before signing for Cypriot club Enosis Neon Paralimni in January 2025.

In July 2025 he signed for Lithuanian club Banga. On 4 August 2025 Seedorf made his debut, against FA Šiauliai.

On 30 January 2026, Seedorf signed for Jordanian Pro League club Al-Wehdat until the end of the season. On 7 February 2026, he scored on his debut during the Derby of Jordan win against Al-Faisaly. Later that year he signed for Cambodian Premier League club Visakha.

== Career statistics ==
As of 7 February 2026

Appearances and goals by club, season and competition
Club	Season	League			National cup		League cup		Other		Total	
Club	Season	Division	Apps	Goals	Apps	Goals	Apps	Goals	Apps	Goals	Apps	Goals
Wolverhampton Wanderers	2018–19	Premier League	0	0	0	0	0	0	0	0	0	0
Bradford City (loan)	2018–19	League One	6	0	0	0	1	0	3 (Note: Appearances in the EFL Trophy)	0	10	0
FC Jumilla (loan)	2018–19	Segunda División B	9	0	0	0	0	0	0	0	9	0
Motherwell	2019–20	Scottish Premiership	22	2	1	0	5	1	0	0	28	3
Motherwell	2020–21	Scottish Premiership	10	0	0	1	0	0	2 (Note: Appearances in the UEFA Europa League.)	0	13	0
Motherwell	Total		32	2	1	0	5	1	2	0	41	3
Länk Vilaverdense	2023–24	Liga Portugal 2	14	0	0	0	0	0	0	0	14	0
Velež Nevesinje	2024–25	First League of the Republika Srpska	12	0	0	0	0	0	0	0	12	0
Enosis Neon Paralimni	2024–25	Cypriot First Division	12	0	1	0	0	0	0	0	13	0
Banga Gargždai	2025	A Lyga	16	5	0	0	0	0	2 (Note: Appearances in the UEFA Conference League)	0	18	5
Al-Wehdat	2025–26	Jordanian Pro League	1	1	0	0	0	0	0	0	1	1
Career total			102	8	2	0	6	1	7	0	117	9
