= Chung Nguyen Do =

Bulgarian footballer (born 2005)

Chung Nguyen Do Trần Thành Chung
Personal information
- Full name: Chung Thanh Nguyen Do; Trần Thành Chung
- Date of birth: 23 May 2005 (age 21)
- Place of birth: Sofia, Bulgaria
- Height: 1.75 m (5 ft 9 in)
- Position: Midfielder

Team information
- Current team: Ninh Binh
- Number: 8

Youth career
- 2011–2012: CSKA Sofia
- 2012–2023: Slavia Sofia

Senior career*
Years	Team	Apps	(Gls)
2022–2023	Slavia Sofia II	27	(0)
2023–2025	Slavia Sofia	59	(2)
2025–	Ninh Binh	24	(2)

International career^{‡}
2021–2022	Bulgaria U17	13	(0)
2022–2024	Bulgaria U19	10	(0)
2024	Bulgaria U20	1	(0)
2023–2025	Bulgaria U21	8	(0)
2025–	Vietnam U23	3	(0)
- * Club domestic league appearances and goals as of 25 October 2026 ‡ National team caps and goals as of 28 March 2026

Chung Thanh Nguyen Do (Bulgarian: Чунг Тханг Нгуен До; born 23 May 2005), also known as Trần Thành Trung, is a professional footballer who plays as a midfielder for V.League 1 club Ninh Binh. Born in Bulgaria, he represented his native country at youth international levels before opting to play for Vietnam in 2025.

== Club career ==
Born in Sofia to Vietnamese parents, Do started his career aged six in CSKA Sofia academy, before moving to Slavia Sofia. Starting as a goalkeeper, he switched to midfielder because he wanted to enjoy the game more. In the summer of 2022, it was reported that Barcelona are interested in Do. In January 2023 he was promoted to the first team and joined the winter camp. Chung completed his professional debut in a league match against Pirin Blagoevgrad on 13 January 2023.

On 27 July 2025, Do was transferred to V.League 1 club Ninh Binh, signing a five-year contract with the Vietnamese side, for a reported transfer fee of €500,000.

== International career ==
=== Bulgaria Youth ===
Being eligible for both Bulgaria and Vietnam, Do represented Bulgaria at youth level. He was called up for Bulgaria U17 in 2021 and helped the team to qualify to the European U17 Championship. Chung was in the squad for the 2022 UEFA European Under-17 Championship. In September 2022 he was called up for Bulgaria U19 for the 2023 UEFA European Under-19 Championship qualification matches.

On 18 March 2023, he received his first call-up for the Bulgaria U21 for the friendly tournament Antalya Cup between 25 and 28 March 2023.

=== Vietnam ===
On 6 August 2025, Do's request to switch international allegiance to Vietnam was approved by FIFA. On 25 August 2025, he was called up to the Vietnam under-23 national team for the first time to prepare for the 2026 AFC U-23 Asian Cup qualification. However, he was dropped from the final squad due to an injury.

On 13 October 2025, Do made his debut for Vietnam U23 in a friendly match against Qatar U23.

== Personal life ==
Do has Vietnamese citizenship since 2018, under the name Trần Thành Trung. His brother Thang Chung Chan (Trần Trung Thắng) is also a footballer and plays for his former team Slavia Sofia.

== Career statistics ==
=== Club ===
As of 25 October 2026

Club performance			League		National cup		Continental		Other		Total	
Club	League	Season	Apps	Goals	Apps	Goals	Apps	Goals	Apps	Goals	Apps	Goals
Slavia Sofia II	Third League	2022–23	20	0	–		–		–		20	0
Slavia Sofia II	Third League	2023–24	7	0	–		–		–		7	0
Slavia Sofia II	Total		27	0	0	0	0	0	0	0	27	0
Slavia Sofia	First League	2022–23	16	0	1	0	–		–		17	0
Slavia Sofia	First League	2023–24	11	0	0	0	–		–		11	0
Slavia Sofia	First League	2024–25	31	2	2	0	–		–		33	2
Slavia Sofia	First League	2025–26	1	0	–		–		–		1	0
Slavia Sofia	Total		59	2	3	0	0	0	0	0	62	2
Ninh Bình	V.League 1	2025–26	21	2	2	0	–		–		23	2
Ninh Bình	V.League 1	2026–27	3	0	0	0	–		–		3	0
Ninh Bình	Total		24	2	2	0	0	0	0	0	26	2
Career total			110	4	5	0	0	0	0	0	115	4
