= Christian Ilić =

Austrian-born Croatian footballer

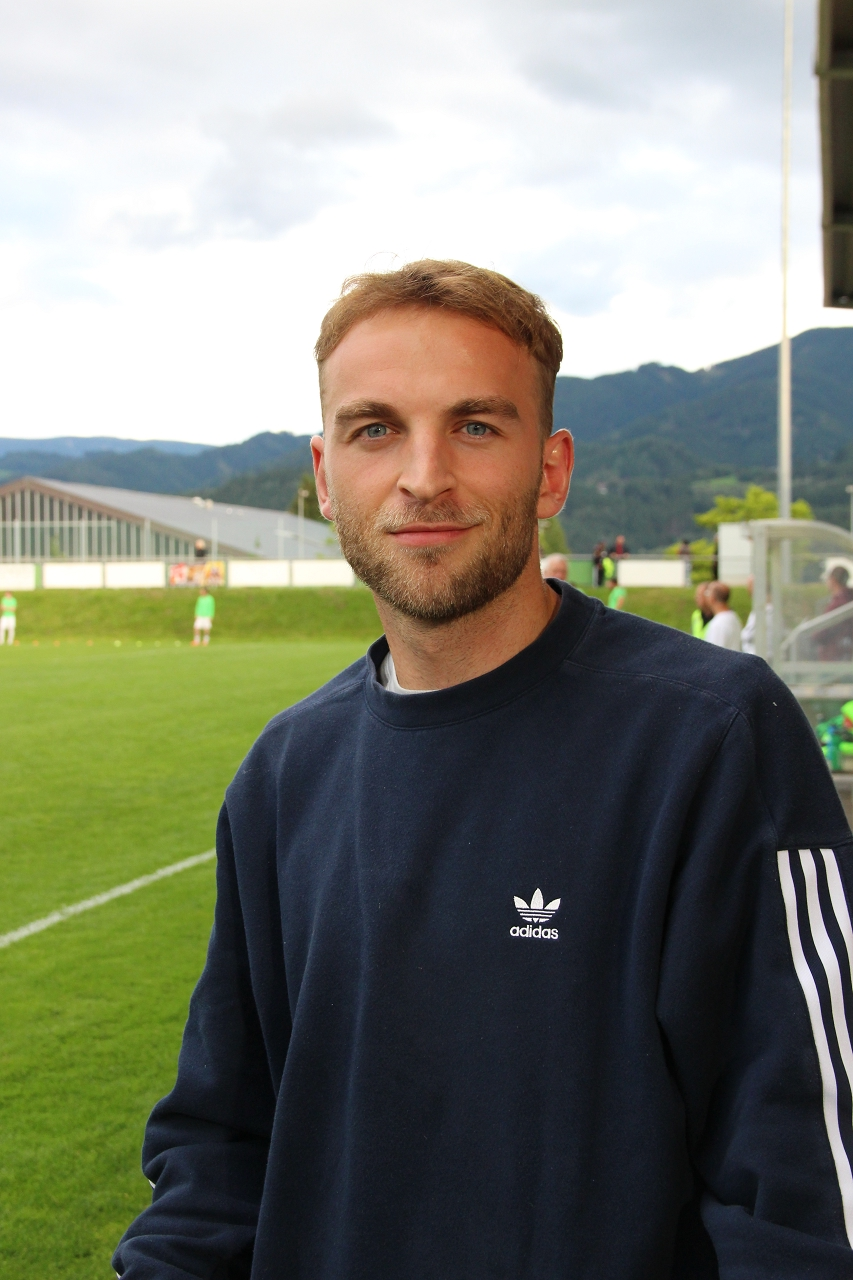
- Ilić in 2021

Personal information
- Date of birth: 22 July 1996 (age 30)
- Place of birth: Friesach, Austria
- Height: 1.84 m (6 ft 0 in)
- Position: Midfielder

Team information
- Current team: Lamphun Warriors

Youth career
- 2001–2007: WSV St. Lambrecht
- 2007–2010: FC Judenburg
- 2010–2011: SVU Murau
- 2011–2012: WSV St. Lambrecht

Senior career*
Years	Team	Apps	(Gls)
2012–2014	SC Weiz	6	(1)
2014–2019	TSV Hartberg	90	(6)
2019–2020	Motherwell	8	(0)
2020–2021	Lokomotiv Plovdiv	26	(4)
2021–2022	Kryvbas Kryvyi Rih	9	(1)
2022–2023	Doxa Katokopias	34	(0)
2023–2024	Dinamo București	23	(0)
2024–2025	Spartak Varna	28	(1)
2025–2026	Bhayangkara Presisi	14	(0)
2026–	Lamphun Warriors	0	(0)
- * Club domestic league appearances and goals as of 12 January 2026

Christian Ilić (born 22 July 1996) is a Croatian professional footballer who plays as a midfielder for Thai League 1 club Lamphun Warriors.

== Club career ==
Ilić made his Austrian Football First League debut for TSV Hartberg on 12 September 2014 in a game against SKN St. Pölten.

Ilić signed a one-year contract with Motherwell on 12 July 2019. On 31 May 2020, Motherwell confirmed that Ilić was leaving the club at the end of his contract.

On 21 August 2020, Ilić signed a two-year contract with Bulgarian club Lokomotiv Plovdiv.

In July 2024, he returned to Bulgaria, signing a contract with newly promoted First League club Spartak Varna.
