= Quentin Seedorf =

Dutch footballer

Personal information
- Full name: Quentin Jürgen Seedorf
- Date of birth: 14 September 2000 (age 26)
- Place of birth: Amsterdam, Netherlands
- Height: 1.78 m (5 ft 10 in)
- Position: Left-back

Team information
- Current team: Dubočica
- Number: 41

Youth career
- –2014: Almere City
- 2014–2019: Vitesse

Senior career*
Years	Team	Apps	(Gls)
2017–2019	Jong Vitesse	5	(0)
2019–2022	Zagłębie Sosnowiec	57	(5)
2023–2025	Slavia Sofia	29	(2)
2025–	Dubočica	19	(1)
- * Club domestic league appearances and goals as of 23:11, 7 May 2026 (UTC)

Quentin Jürgen Seedorf (born 14 September 2000) is a Dutch professional footballer who plays as a left-back for Serbian First League club Dubočica.

== Career ==
Seedorf started his senior career with Almere City FC before joining SBV Vitesse in 2014.

In 2019, he signed for Zagłębie Sosnowiec in the Polish I liga. On 23 May 2022, it was announced he would leave the club at the end of the season.

== Personal life ==
Quentin is the nephew of a former AC Milan and Real Madrid midfielder Clarence Seedorf.
