= 2017–18 Motherwell F.C. season =

Motherwell
2017–18 season
- Chairman: Brian McCafferty
- Manager: Steve Robinson
- Stadium: Fir Park
- Scottish Premiership: 7th
- Scottish Cup: Runners-up vs Celtic
- League Cup: Runners-up vs Celtic
- Top goalscorer: League: Louis Moult (8); All: Louis Moult (14)
Home colours	Away colours

The 2017–18 season was Motherwell's thirty-third consecutive season in the top flight of Scottish football and the fifth in the newly established Scottish Premiership, having been promoted from the Scottish First Division at the end of the 1984–85 season. Motherwell also competed in the League Cup and the Scottish Cup losing to Celtic in both finals

== Season Review ==
On 2 June, Motherwell announced that they had signed Alex Fisher and Gaël Bigirimana, from Inverness C.T. and Coventry City respectively, on two-year contracts and that James McFadden had left the club. Three days later Motherwell announced their third signing of the season, Craig Tanner on a two-year contract from Reading. Motherwell announced their fourth signing of the summer on 6 June, goalkeeper Trevor Carson from Hartlepool United on a three-year contract. Russell Griffiths became Motherwell's sixth signing of the season on 21 June, signing a one-year contract with the club after his Everton contract had expired. Also on 21 June, Keith Lasley hung up his boots and became the club's new assistant manager. Motherwell announced their seventh summer signing on 30 June, Charles Dunne from Oldham Athletic.

On 5 July, Motherwell announced the signing of Cédric Kipré on a one-year contract after his release from Leicester City. Craig Clay left the club on 17 July to sign with Leyton Orient.

Young striker George Newell signed a one-year contract with Motherwell on 24 July, with Ellis Plummer joining on 2 August.

On 14 August, it was announced that Stephen McManus had decided to retire from professional football and take up a coaching role with Motherwell.

6 weeks into his one-year deal, Cédric Kipré signed a one-year extension with Motherwell on 23 August.

On 31 August, transfer deadline day, Ben Heneghan joined Sheffield United for an undisclosed fee, whilst Jack McMillan joined Livingston on loan until January 2018, and P. J. Morrison joined Clyde on loan until January 2018. Liam Grimshaw returned to the club from Preston North End, and Peter Hartley joined the club on a one-year loan deal.

On 13 October, manager Stephen Robinson extended his contract until 2020, and midfielder Allan Campbell signed a new contract until 2021.

On 14 December, Motherwell announced that they had agreed to the transfer of Louis Moult to Preston North End for an undisclosed fee on 1 January 2018.

On 16 December, Motherwell announced the signing of Gennadios Xenodochof on a short-term contract until the middle January 2018.

On 3 January, Motherwell signed Curtis Main to an eighteen-month contract from Portsmouth.

On 5 January, Motherwell announced that Steven Hammell would retire at the end of January to take up the role of the club's Academy Director.

On 9 January, Motherwell signed Nadir Çiftçi on loan from Celtic until the end of the season. A week later, 16 January, Motherwell signed Tom Aldred on loan until the end of the season from Bury.

Following the completion of his loan deal, Jack McMillan signed for Livingston permanently on 19 January 2018. On 23 January, Peter Hartley made his loan move permanent, signing until the summer of 2020. On 26 January, Alex Fisher left the club to sign for Yeovil Town.

On 31 January, transfer deadline day, Motherwell signed Stephen Hendrie on loan from Southend United until the end of the season, whilst Adam Livingstone joined East Fife on loan for the remainder of the season.

On 13 April, Motherwell announced that defenders Cédric Kipré, Charles Dunne and Richard Tait all had extended their contracts until the summer of 2020, whilst Ryan Bowman had extended his contract until the summer of 2019.

On 16 May, Motherwell announced that midfielders Liam Grimshaw and Andy Rose had signed new one-year contracts with the club.

On 21 May, Motherwell announced that Russell Griffiths, Ellis Plummer, Deimantas Petravičius, Luke Watt and Dylan King would be leaving the club at the end of their contracts, whilst Tom Aldred, Stephen Hendrie and Nadir Çiftçi would be returning to their parent clubs after their loan deals had expired. Shea Gordon, Adam Livingstone, Barry Maguire, James Scott, P. J. Morrison, Jason Krones, Jordan Armstrong, Shaun Bowers and Alfredo Agyeman were all offered new contracts.

== Squad ==
As of match played 19 May 2018

No.	Name	Nationality	Position	Date of birth (age)	Signed from	Signed in	Contract ends	Apps.	Goals
Goalkeepers
1	Trevor Carson	(Northern Ireland)	GK	5 March 1988 (aged 30)	Hartlepool United	2017	2020	46	0
13	Russell Griffiths	(England)	GK	13 April 1996 (aged 22)	Everton	2017	2018	10	0
39	P. J. Morrison	(Scotland)	GK	1 January 1998 (aged 20)	Academy	2015		0	0
Defenders
2	Richard Tait	(Scotland)	DF	24 March 1989 (aged 29)	Grimsby Town	2016	2020	77	3
3	Stephen Hendrie	(Scotland)	DF	8 January 1995 (aged 23)	loan from Southend United	2018	2018	7	0
6	Peter Hartley	(England)	DF	3 April 1988 (aged 30)	Blackpool	2018	2020	17	3
14	Ellis Plummer	(England)	DF	2 September 1994 (aged 23)	Manchester City	2017	2018	1	0
18	Charles Dunne	(Republic of Ireland)	DF	13 February 1993 (aged 25)	Oldham Athletic	2017	2020	45	1
19	Tom Aldred	(Scotland)	DF	11 September 1990 (aged 27)	loan from Bury	2018	2018	22	1
21	Cédric Kipré	(Ivory Coast)	DF	9 December 1996 (aged 21)	Leicester City	2017	2020	49	1
30	Luke Watt	(Scotland)	DF	20 June 1997 (aged 20)	Academy	2014	2018	8	0
	Yusuf Hussain	(Scotland)	DF	26 April 2001 (aged 17)	Falkirk	2018		0	0
Midfielders
4	Liam Grimshaw	(England)	MF	2 February 1995 (aged 23)	Preston North End	2017	2019	37	0
5	Gaël Bigirimana	(Burundi)	MF	22 October 1993 (aged 24)	Coventry City	2017	2019	36	2
7	Chris Cadden	(Scotland)	MF	19 September 1996 (aged 21)	Academy	2013	2019	114	11
8	Carl McHugh	(Republic of Ireland)	MF	5 February 1993 (aged 25)	Plymouth Argyle	2016	2019	69	3
11	Elliott Frear	(England)	MF	11 September 1990 (aged 27)	Forest Green Rovers	2017	2019	45	4
15	Andy Rose	(Australia)	MF	13 February 1990 (aged 28)	Coventry City	2017	2019	40	2
22	Allan Campbell	(Scotland)	MF	4 July 1997 (aged 20)	Academy	2015	2021	43	3
26	Ross MacLean	(Scotland)	MF	13 March 1997 (aged 21)	Academy	2014	2019	19	1
28	Shea Gordon	(Northern Ireland)	MF	16 May 1998 (aged 20)	Stalybridge Celtic	2017		4	0
31	David Turnbull	(Scotland)	MF	10 July 1999 (aged 18)	Academy	2017		3	0
32	Dylan King	(Northern Ireland)	MF	27 August 1998 (aged 19)	Oldham Athletic	2017	2018	0	0
33	Liam Brown	(Scotland)	MF	6 August 1999 (aged 18)	Queen's Park	2017		1	0
34	Barry Maguire	(Scotland)	MF	27 April 1998 (aged 20)	Academy	2015		3	0
35	Jake Hastie	(Scotland)	MF	18 March 1999 (aged 19)	Academy	2016		3	0
37	Jordan Armstrong	(Scotland)	MF	2 April 1999 (aged 19)	Academy	2017		0	0
41	Kyle MacDonald	(Scotland)	MF	1 January 2000 (aged 18)	Academy	2017		0	0
Forwards
9	Curtis Main	(England)	FW	20 June 1992 (aged 25)	Portsmouth	2018	2019	21	7
12	Ryan Bowman	(England)	FW	30 November 1991 (aged 26)	Gateshead	2016	2019	66	12
20	Deimantas Petravičius	(Lithuania)	FW	2 September 1995 (aged 22)	Zagłębie Lubin	2017	2018	14	0
23	Nadir Çiftçi	(Turkey)	FW	12 February 1992 (aged 26)	loan from Celtic	2018	2018	15	3
24	George Newell	(England)	FW	27 December 1997 (aged 20)	Bolton Wanderers	2017	2018	9	0
27	Craig Tanner	(England)	FW	27 October 1994 (aged 23)	Reading	2017	2019	36	9
36	Dylan Falconer	(Scotland)	FW	23 May 1999 (aged 18)	Academy	2015		0	0
38	James Scott	(Scotland)	FW	30 August 2000 (aged 17)	Academy	2017		2	0
40	Alfredo Agyeman	(Ghana)	FW	1 November 2000 (aged 17)	Academy	2018		0	0
42	Jamie Semple	(Scotland)	FW	17 May 2000 (aged 18)	Academy	2017		0	0
Away on loan
16	Rohan Ferguson	(Scotland)	GK	6 December 1997 (aged 20)	Airdrieonians	2017	2020	0	0
43	Adam Livingstone	(Scotland)	DF	22 February 1998 (aged 20)	Academy	2015		2	0
Left during the season
3	Steven Hammell	(Scotland)	DF	18 February 1982 (aged 35)	Southend United	2008	2018	582	5
4	Ben Heneghan	(England)	DF	19 September 1993 (aged 23)	Chester	2016	2018	50	1
6	Stephen McManus	(Scotland)	DF	10 September 1982 (aged 34)	Middlesbrough	2013	2018	156	6
9	Louis Moult	(England)	FW	14 May 1992 (aged 25)	Wrexham	2015	2018	98	50
17	Alex Fisher	(England)	FW	30 June 1990 (aged 26)	Inverness Caledonian Thistle	2017		19	0
19	Jacob Blyth	(England)	FW	14 August 1992 (aged 24)	Leicester City	2016	2018	9	0
19	Gennadios Xenodochof	(Georgia (country))	GK	30 May 1988 (aged 28)	Unattached	2017	2018	0	0
30	Jack McMillan	(Scotland)	DF	18 December 1997 (aged 19)	Academy	2015		16	0

== Transfers ==
=== In ===
Date	Position	Nationality	Name	From	Fee	Ref.
2 June 2017	FW	(England)	Alex Fisher	Inverness C.T.	Free	
2 June 2017	MF	(Burundi)	Gaël Bigirimana	Coventry City	Free	
5 June 2017	FW	(England)	Craig Tanner	Reading	Free	
6 June 2017	GK	(Northern Ireland)	Trevor Carson	Hartlepool United	Undisclosed	
13 June 2017	MF	(Australia)	Andy Rose	Coventry City	Free	
21 June 2017	GK	(England)	Russell Griffiths	Everton	Free	
30 June 2017	DF	(Republic of Ireland)	Charles Dunne	Oldham Athletic	Free	
5 July 2017	DF	(Ivory Coast)	Cédric Kipré	Leicester City	Free	
24 July 2017	FW	(England)	George Newell	Bolton Wanderers	Free	
2 August 2017	DF	(England)	Ellis Plummer	Manchester City	Free	
18 August 2017	GK	(Scotland)	Rohan Ferguson	Airdrieonians	Undisclosed	
22 August 2017	FW	(Lithuania)	Deimantas Petravičius	Zagłębie Lubin	Undisclosed	
31 August 2017	MF	(England)	Liam Grimshaw	Preston North End	Free	
16 December 2017	GK	(Georgia (country))	Gennadios Xenodochof	Unattached	Free	
1 January 2018	DF	(Scotland)	Yusuf Hussain	Falkirk	Undisclosed	
3 January 2018	FW	(England)	Curtis Main	Portsmouth	Undisclosed	
23 January 2018	DF	(England)	Peter Hartley	Blackpool	Undisclosed	

=== Loans in ===
Date from	Position	Nationality	Name	From	Date to	Ref.
31 August 2017	DF	(England)	Peter Hartley	Blackpool	23 January 2018	
9 January 2018	FW	(Turkey)	Nadir Çiftçi	Celtic	31 May 2018	
16 January 2018	DF	(Scotland)	Tom Aldred	Bury	31 May 2018	
31 January 2018	DF	(Scotland)	Stephen Hendrie	Southend United	31 May 2018	

=== Out ===
Date	Position	Nationality	Name	To	Fee	Ref.
12 July 2017	MF	(Scotland)	Dom Thomas	Kilmarnock	Free	
17 July 2017	MF	(England)	Craig Clay	Leyton Orient	Undisclosed	
31 August 2017	DF	(England)	Ben Heneghan	Sheffield United	Undisclosed	
14 December 2017†	FW	(England)	Louis Moult	Preston North End	Undisclosed	
19 January 2018	DF	(Scotland)	Jack McMillan	Livingston	Undisclosed	
26 January 2018	FW	(England)	Alex Fisher	Yeovil Town	Free	

† Moult's transfers was announced on the above date, but were not finalised until 1 January 2018.

=== Loans out ===
Date from	Position	Nationality	Name	To	Date to	Ref.
18 August 2017	GK	(Scotland)	Rohan Ferguson	Airdrieonians	31 May 2018	
18 August 2017	DF	(Scotland)	Luke Watt	Airdrieonians	Six-month	
18 August 2017	MF	(Scotland)	Jake Hastie	Airdrieonians	Six-month	
31 August 2017	GK	(Scotland)	P. J. Morrison	Clyde	January 2018	
31 August 2017	DF	(Scotland)	Jack McMillan	Livingston	January 2018	
31 January 2018	DF	(Scotland)	Adam Livingstone	East Fife	31 May 2018	

=== Released ===
Date	Position	Nationality	Name	Joined	Date	Ref.
2 June 2017	FW	(Scotland)	James McFadden	Queen of the South	8 September 2017	
21 June 2017	MF	(Scotland)	Keith Lasley	Retired		
8 August 2017	FW	(England)	Jacob Blyth	Barrow	26 June 2018	
14 August 2017	DF	(Scotland)	Stephen McManus	Retired		
16 January 2018	GK	(Georgia (country))	Gennadios Xenodochof	AEL	8 February 2018	
31 January 2018	DF	(Scotland)	Steven Hammell	Retired		
31 May 2018	GK	(England)	Russell Griffiths	AFC Fylde	28 June 2018	
31 May 2018	DF	(England)	Ellis Plummer	Retired	3 September 2019	
31 May 2018	DF	(Scotland)	Luke Watt	NK Novigrad		
31 May 2018	MF	(Northern Ireland)	Dylan King	Glenavon	26 June 2018	
31 May 2018	FW	(Lithuania)	Deimantas Petravičius	Falkirk	19 June 2018	

=== Trial ===
Date From	Position	Nationality	Name	Last club	Date To	Ref.
	DF	(France)	Bira Dembélé	Barnet		
	DF	(Ivory Coast)	Cédric Kipré	Leicester City		
	FW	(England)	Shaun Tuton	Barnsley		
8 February 2018	GK	(India)	Dheeraj Moirangthem	Indian Arrows		

== Friendlies ==
1 July 2017 Friendly	Stirling Albion	0 – 2	Motherwell	Stirling
15:00 BST		Report	Tuton; Bowman	Stadium: Forthbank Stadium; Attendance: 1,044

4 July 2017 Friendly	Livingston	0 – 2	Motherwell	Livingston
19:45 BST		Report	Bigirimana 44'; Bowman 86'	Stadium: Almondvale Stadium; Attendance: 824

8 July 2017 Friendly	Gateshead	3 – 2	Motherwell	Gateshead
12:00 BST	M.Langstaff 40'; Green 64'; T.White 76'	Report	Bowman 90+1'; Rose 90+2'	Stadium: Gateshead International Stadium; Attendance: 553

11 July 2017 Friendly	Barrow	1 – 0	Motherwell	Barrow-in-Furness
18:30 BST	R.Bennett 9'	Report		Stadium: Holker Street

== Competitions ==
=== Premiership ===
==== League table ====
Pos	Team	Pld	W	D	L	GF	GA	GD	Pts	Qualification or relegation (Note: Teams play each other three times (33 matches) before the league is split into two groups (the top six and the bottom six).)
5	Kilmarnock	38	16	11	11	49	47	+2	59	
6	Heart of Midlothian	38	12	13	13	39	39	0	49	
7	Motherwell	38	13	9	16	43	49	−6	48	
8	St Johnstone	38	12	10	16	42	53	−11	46	
9	Dundee	38	11	6	21	36	57	−21	39	

Source: Soccerway BBC
Rules for classification: 1) Points; 2) Goal difference; 3) Goals scored; 4) Play-off (only if deciding champion, UEFA competitions qualification and second-stage group allocation).

==== Results by round ====
Round	1	2	3	4	5	6	7	8	9	10	11	12	13	14	15	16	17	18	19	20	21	22	23	24	25	26	27	28	29	30	31	32	33	34	35	36	37	38
Ground	H	A	H	H	H	A	H	H	A	A	H	A	A	H	A	A	A	A	H	A	H	H	A	A	H	H	H	A	A	H	H	H	A	A	H	H	A	H
Result	L	L	W	W	W	D	L	W	W	W	L	L	W	D	L	L	L	L	D	L	L	W	D	L	D	W	L	W	L	D	D	L	D	D	W	L	W	W
Position	9	11	8	7	5	5	6	5	4	3	4	5	5	5	5	5	6	7	8	8	8	6	6	6	7	6	7	7	7	7	7	7	7	7	7	7	7	7

Source: See Results
A = Away; H = Home; W = Win; D = Draw; L = Loss

==== Results summary ====
Overall								Home						Away					
Pld	W	D	L	GF	GA	GD	Pts	W	D	L	GF	GA	GD	W	D	L	GF	GA	GD
38	13	9	16	43	49	−6	48	8	5	7	26	22	+4	5	4	9	17	27	−10

Source: See Results

==== Results ====
6 August 2017 1	Motherwell	1 – 2	Rangers	Motherwell
13:30 BST (UTC+1)	Heneghan 40' (yellow card) 78'; Dunne (yellow card) 49'; Moult (yellow card) 58'; Tait (yellow card) 90+1'	Report	Dorrans 4', 58' (pen.) (yellow card) 79'; Cardoso (yellow card) 68'	Stadium: Fir Park; Attendance: 9,974; Referee: Bobby Madden

12 August 2017 2	St Johnstone	4 – 1	Motherwell	Perth
15:00 BST (UTC+1)	MacLean 8' (yellow card) 57'; O'Halloran 18', 74'; Davidson 90+3'	Report	Rose 28'; McHugh (yellow card) 36' (yellow-red card) 76'; Carson (red card) 63'; Dunne (red card) 89'	Stadium: McDiarmid Park; Attendance: 3,451; Referee: Craig Thomson

19 August 2017 3	Motherwell	2 – 0	Ross County	Motherwell
15:00 BST (UTC+1)	Heneghan (yellow card) 3'; Rose (yellow card) 27'; Tait 53'; Moult 74' (pen.)	Report	Chow (yellow card) 17'; Fraser (yellow card) 46' van der Weg (red card) 74'	Stadium: Fir Park; Attendance: 3,911; Referee: Alan Muir

26 August 2017 4	Motherwell	2 – 1	Heart of Midlothian	Motherwell
15:00 BST (UTC+1)	Bowman 37'; Moult 41'; Frear (yellow card) 49'; Kipré (yellow card) 71'	Report	Grzelak (yellow card) 10'; Lafferty 30'; Randall (yellow card) 60'; Walker (yellow card) 77'	Stadium: Fir Park; Attendance: 6,568; Referee: John Beaton

9 September 2017 5	Motherwell	2 – 0	Kilmarnock	Motherwell
15:00 BST (UTC+1)	Kipré (yellow card) 24'; Bowman 65'; Grimshaw (yellow card) 84'; Moult 88' (pen.); McHugh (yellow card) 90+2'	Report	Wilson (yellow card) 88'	Stadium: Fir Park; Attendance: 4,621; Referee: Bobby Madden

16 September 2017 6	Hibernian	2 – 2	Motherwell	Edinburgh
15:00 BST (UTC+1)	Stokes 21' (pen.), 57'; Slivka (yellow card) 70'	Report	Tait (yellow card) 15'; Moult (yellow card) 21' (goal) 64', 74'; McHugh (yellow card) 36'; Kipré (yellow card) 88'	Stadium: Easter Road; Attendance: 17,335; Referee: Barry Cook

24 September 2017 7	Motherwell	0 – 1	Aberdeen	Motherwell
12:15 BST (UTC+1)	McHugh (yellow card) 49'; Dunne (yellow card) 88'	Report	Logan (yellow card) 45'; Considine 57'; Shinnie (yellow card) 89'	Stadium: Fir Park; Attendance: 4,535; Referee: Nick Walsh

30 September 2017 8	Motherwell	3 – 0	Partick Thistle	Motherwell
15:00 BST (UTC+1)	Hartley 7'; Tanner 56'; Bowman 82'	Report	Černý (yellow card) 6'; Barton (yellow card) 33'; Lawless (yellow card) 85'; Edwards (yellow card) 87'	Stadium: Fir Park; Attendance: 4,692; Referee: Greg Aitken

14 October 2017 9	Hamilton Academical	1 – 2	Motherwell	Hamilton
15:00 BST (UTC+1)	Skondras 15'; Biabi (yellow card) 49'	Report	Rose 32'; McHugh (yellow card) 35'; Hartley 51'; Campbell (yellow card) 76'	Stadium: New Douglas Park; Attendance: 3,869; Referee: Craig Thomson

21 October 2017 10	Motherwell	v	Celtic	Motherwell
15:00 BST (UTC+1)				Stadium: Fir Park
Note: Match postponed due to both Motherwell and Celtic participating in the League Cup Semi-finals.

25 October 2017 11	Dundee	0 – 1	Motherwell	Dundee
19:45 BST (UTC+1)	Deacon (yellow card) 28'; O'Dea (yellow card) 30'; Moussa (yellow card) 64'	Report	Tanner 5'; Hartley (yellow card) 34'; Tait (yellow card) 70'; Bigirimana (yellow card) 77'	Stadium: Dens Park; Attendance: 5,254; Referee: Stephen Finnie

28 October 2017 12	Motherwell	0 – 1	Hibernian	Motherwell
15:00 BST (UTC+1)	Campbell (yellow card) 52'	Report	Boyle 27'	Stadium: Fir Park; Attendance: 6,043; Referee: Bobby Madden

4 November 2017 13	Ross County	3 – 2	Motherwell	Dingwall
15:00 GMT (UTC)	Gardyne 13', 42'; Keillor-Dunn 26'; Draper (yellow card) 84'	Report	Bowman 48'; Hartley (yellow card) 52'; Moult 79'	Stadium: Victoria Park; Attendance: 4,014; Referee: Euan Anderson

18 November 2017 14	Aberdeen	0 – 2	Motherwell	Aberdeen
15:00 GMT (UTC)	Considine (yellow card) 42'; Christie (yellow card) 86'	Report	Bowman (yellow card) 41'; Moult 42', 54'	Stadium: Pittodrie Stadium; Attendance: 14,013; Referee: Bobby Madden

25 November 2017 15	Motherwell	v	St Johnstone	Motherwell
15:00 GMT (UTC)				Stadium: Fir Park

29 November 2017 10	Motherwell	1 – 1	Celtic	Motherwell
19:45 BST (UTC+1)	Campbell (yellow card) 51'; McHugh (yellow card) 74'; Lustig 78' (o.g.); Moult (yellow card) 81'; Dunne (yellow card) 86'	Report	Sinclair 88' (pen.); Griffiths (yellow card) 90+3'	Stadium: Fir Park; Attendance: 9,164; Referee: Willie Collum
Note: Match rearranged from 21 October 2017 due to both Motherwell and Celtic participating in the League Cup Semi-finals.

2 December 2017 16	Celtic	5 – 1	Motherwell	Glasgow
15:00 GMT (UTC)	Brown (yellow card) 11'; Édouard 16', 33', 85'; Forrest 76', 88'	Report	Tait (yellow card) 24'; Campbell (yellow card) 37'; Frear 65'; McHugh (yellow card) 75'	Stadium: Celtic Park; Referee: Kevin Clancy

9 December 2017 17	Heart of Midlothian	1 – 0	Motherwell	Edinburgh
15:00 GMT (UTC)	Lafferty 39'	Report	Kipré (yellow card) 32'; Tait (yellow card) 85'	Stadium: Tynecastle Park; Attendance: 15,984; Referee: Dallas

13 December 2017 18	Partick Thistle	3 – 2	Motherwell	Glasgow
19:45 GMT (UTC)	Spittal 16'; Edwards 22'; Sammon 28'; McGinn (yellow card) 90+2'	Report	Bowman 56' (yellow card) 70'; Tanner 79'	Stadium: Firhill Stadium; Attendance: 2,452; Referee: Don Robertson

16 December 2017 19	Kilmarnock	1 – 0	Motherwell	Kilmarnock
15:00 GMT (UTC)	S.Boyd 42'; Broadfoot (yellow card) 88'	Report	McHugh (yellow card) 79'	Stadium: Rugby Park; Attendance: 4,179; Referee: Euan Anderson

23 December 2017 20	Motherwell	1 – 1	Dundee	Motherwell
15:00 GMT (UTC)	Bigirimana (yellow card) 55'; Rose (yellow card) 58'; Tanner 61' (pen.)	Report	Moussa (yellow card) 45'; McGowan 47'; Kerr (yellow card) 88'	Stadium: Fir Park; Attendance: 4,173; Referee: Don Robertson

27 December 2017 21	Rangers	2 – 0	Motherwell	Glasgow
19:45 GMT (UTC)	Wilson 56'; McCrorie (yellow card) 68'; Morelos 76'	Report	Kipré (yellow card) 42'; Tait (yellow card) 45+7'; Bigirimana (yellow card) 73'; Grimshaw (yellow card) 82'	Stadium: Ibrox Stadium; Attendance: 49,273; Referee: John Beaton

30 December 2017 22	Motherwell	1 – 3	Hamilton Academical	Motherwell
15:00 GMT (UTC)	Tanner 3'; Hartley (yellow card) 41' (red card) 90+4'; Grimshaw (yellow card) 86'; Hammell (yellow card) 88'	Report	Tomas (yellow card) 37'; Imrie 41' (pen.); Donati (yellow card) 52'; Bingham 53'; Docherty 76'	Stadium: Fir Park; Attendance: 4,890; Referee: Andrew Dallas

24 January 2018 23	Motherwell	2 – 0	Ross County	Motherwell
19:45 GMT (UTC)	Souttar 45' (o.g.); Main 47'; Kipré (yellow card) 79'; MacLean (yellow card) 81'	Report	Routis (yellow card) 60'	Stadium: Fir Park; Attendance: 3,196; Referee: Kevin Clancy

27 January 2018 24	Heart of Midlothian	1 – 1	Motherwell	Edinburgh
15:00 GMT (UTC)	Milinković 80'	Report	McHugh (yellow card) 46'; Main (yellow card) 66' (goal) 90+6'	Stadium: Tynecastle Stadium; Attendance: 16,717; Referee: Willie Collum

31 January 2018 25	Hibernian	2 – 1	Motherwell	Edinburgh
19:45 GMT (UTC)	Kamberi 28'; Barker 47'	Report	Tait (yellow card) 17'; Campbell (yellow card) 31'; Main 78' (yellow card) 90+2'	Stadium: Easter Road; Attendance: 15,459; Referee: Alan Muir

3 February 2018 26	Motherwell	1 – 1	Partick Thistle	Motherwell
15:00 GMT (UTC)	Tait (yellow card) 52'; McHugh (yellow card) 66'; Çiftçi 79'	Report	Osman (yellow card) 43'; Doolan 53'; McGinn (yellow card) 61'; Dumbuya (yellow card) 74'; Edwards (yellow card) 89'	Stadium: Fir Park; Attendance: 4,607; Referee: Nick Walsh

6 February 2017 15	Motherwell	2 – 0	St Johnstone	Motherwell
19:45 GMT (UTC)	Campbell 64'; Main 70'	Report	Kerr (yellow card) 45'	Stadium: Fir Park; Attendance: 3,227; Referee: Don Robertson

17 February 2018 27	Motherwell	0 – 1	Kilmarnock	Motherwell
15:00 GMT (UTC)	Tanner (yellow card) 72'	Report	Brophy (yellow card) 29'; O'Donnell 34'; Broadfoot (yellow card) 53'	Stadium: Fir Park; Attendance: 5,322; Referee: Steven McLean

24 February 2018 28	Dundee	0 – 1	Motherwell	Dundee
15:00 GMT (UTC)	McGowan (yellow card) 75'	Report	Tanner 33' (yellow card) 62'; Çiftçi (yellow card) 51'; McHugh (yellow card) 75'	Stadium: Dens Park; Attendance: 5,003; Referee: Alan Muir

28 February 2018 29	Motherwell	v	Aberdeen	Motherwell
19:45 GMT (UTC)				Stadium: Fir Park
Note: On 28 February, the SPFL postponed all games scheduled to be played on the 28th due heavy snow.

10 March 2018 30	Hamilton Academical	2 – 0	Motherwell	Hamilton
15:00 GMT (UTC)	Ogkmpoe 11'; Ferguson (yellow card) 34'; Templeton 69'	Report	Kipré (yellow card) 51'; Dunne (yellow card) 77'	Stadium: New Douglas Park; Attendance: 3,182; Referee: Steven McLean

18 March 2018 31	Motherwell	0 – 0	Celtic	Motherwell
14:15 GMT (UTC)	McHugh (yellow card) 13'; Kipré (red card) 41'	Report	Ntcham (yellow card) 11'	Stadium: Fir Park; Attendance: 8,717; Referee: Craig Thomson

31 March 2018 32	Motherwell	2 – 2	Rangers	Motherwell
15:00 BST (UTC+1)	Main 9' (pen.); Campbell 16'	Report	Morelos (yellow card) 10'; Tavernier 51' (pen.); Murphy 53'; Dorrans (yellow card) 58'	Stadium: Fir Park; Attendance: 8,915; Referee: Nick Walsh

3 April 2018 29	Motherwell	0 – 2	Aberdeen	Motherwell
19:45 BST (UTC+1)	Tait (yellow card) 80'	Report	Árnason 65'; McLean 68'	Stadium: Fir Park; Attendance: 4,127; Referee: Don Robertson
Note: Match originally scheduled for 28 February.

7 April 2018 33	St Johnstone	0 – 0	Motherwell	Perth
15:00 BST (UTC+1)	Foster (yellow card) 62'; Davidson (yellow card) 80'	Report	Kipré (yellow card) 51'; Rose (yellow card) 75'	Stadium: McDiarmid Park; Attendance: 2,409; Referee: Willie Collum

21 April 2018 34	Ross County	0 – 0	Motherwell	Dingwall
15:00 BST (UTC+1)	Lindsay (yellow card) 45+1'; Schalk (yellow card) 53'; Fontaine (yellow card) 90+1'	Report	Kipré (yellow card) 54'	Stadium: Victoria Park; Attendance: 3,879; Referee: Alan Muir

28 April 2018 35	Motherwell	2 – 1	Dundee	Motherwell
15:00 BST (UTC+1)	Bowman 28'; Kipré 52'	Report	Kusunga 23'; O'Dea (yellow card) 64'; McGowan (yellow card) 90'	Stadium: Fir Park; Attendance: 4,064; Referee: Nick Walsh

5 May 2018 36	Motherwell	1 – 5	St Johnstone	Motherwell
15:00 BST (UTC+1)	Bigirimana 78' (yellow card) 84'; Çiftçi (yellow card) 83'	Report	MacLean 31', 40', 56'; Anderson 36'; Davidson (yellow card) 79'; McMillan 81'	Stadium: Fir Park; Attendance: 3,524; Referee: Gavin Duncan

8 May 2018 37	Partick Thistle	0 – 1	Motherwell	Glasgow
19:45 BST (UTC+1)	Edwards (yellow card) 90+1'	Report	Bowman 60' (yellow card) 75'; Campbell (yellow card) 67'	Stadium: Firhill Stadium; Attendance: 3,320; Referee: Bobby Madden

12 May 2018 38	Motherwell	3 – 0	Hamilton Academical	Motherwell
15:00 BST (UTC+1)	Çiftçi 31', 70'; Aldred 73'	Report	Hughes (yellow card) 54'; McMann (yellow card) 72'	Stadium: Fir Park; Attendance: 4,699; Referee: Alan Muir

=== Scottish Cup ===
20 January 2018 Fourth Round	Motherwell	2 – 0	Hamilton Academical	Motherwell
15:00 GMT (UTC)	McMann 4' (o.g.); Tanner (yellow card) 20' (goal) 35' (pen.); Campbell (yellow card) 70'	Report	Lyon (yellow card) 39'	Stadium: Fir Park; Attendance: 4,725; Referee: Craig Thomson

10 February 2018 Fifth Round	Dundee	0 – 2	Motherwell	Dundee
15:00 GMT (UTC)	McGowan (yellow card) 32'	Report	McHugh (yellow card) 28'; Tanner 30'; Çiftçi (yellow card) 31'; Holt 56' (o.g.)	Stadium: Dens Park; Attendance: 4,663; Referee: Bobby Madden

4 March 2018 Quarter-final	Motherwell	2 – 1	Heart of Midlothian	Motherwell
14:15 GMT (UTC)	Aldred (yellow card) 5'; McLaughlin 7' (o.g.); Kipré (yellow card) 80'; McHugh (yellow card) 22' (goal) 87'	Report	Lafferty 51' (pen.); Naismith (yellow card) 81'; Adão (yellow card) 85'	Stadium: Fir Park; Attendance: 7,564; Referee: Andrew Dallas

14 April 2018 Semi-final	Motherwell	3 – 0	Aberdeen	Glasgow
12:15 BST (UTC+1)	Main 20', 66'; Bowman 22'	Report	O'Connor (yellow card) 57'; Stewart (yellow card) 88'	Stadium: Hampden Park; Attendance: 18,470; Referee: Kevin Clancy

==== Final ====
19 May 2018 Final	Celtic	2 – 0	Motherwell	Glasgow
15:00 BST (UTC+1)	McGregor 11'; Ntcham 25'; Boyata (yellow card) 79'	Report	Tait (yellow card) 36'; Grimshaw (yellow card) 44'; Campbell (yellow card) 62'	Stadium: Hampden Park; Attendance: 49,967; Referee: Kevin Clancy

=== League Cup ===
==== Group stage ====
===== Table =====
Pos	Team	Pld	W	PW	PL	L	GF	GA	GD	Pts	Qualification	MOT	GMO	QPA	EDC	BER
1	Motherwell (Q)	4	4	0	0	0	12	2	+10	12	Qualification for the Second Round	—	4–0	—	—	1–0
2	Greenock Morton	4	2	1	0	1	8	6	+2	8		—	—	p2–2	5–0	—
3	Queen's Park	4	2	0	1	1	9	9	0	7		1–5	—	—	3–0	—
4	Edinburgh City	4	0	1	0	3	3	12	−9	2		1–2	—	—	—	p2–2
5	Berwick Rangers	4	0	0	1	3	4	7	−3	1		—	0–1	2–3	—	—

Rules for classification: 1) goal difference, 2) goals scored, 3) away goals scored, 4) matches won, 5) away matches won, 6) drawing of lots.
(Q) Qualified to the phase indicated

===== Matches =====
15 July 2017 1	Queen's Park	1 – 5	Motherwell	Glasgow
15:00 BST (UTC+1)	Cummins 23'	Report	Cadden 10'; Tanner 53'; Bowman 74', 77'; Moult 85'	Stadium: Hampden Park; Attendance: 1,590; Referee: Don Robertson

22 July 2017 2	Motherwell	4 – 0	Greenock Morton	Motherwell
15:00 BST (UTC+1)	Dunne 3'; Cadden 25'; Bigirimana (yellow card) 32'; Tait 67'; Moult 72'	Report	Harkins (red card) 39'	Stadium: Fir Park; Attendance: 3,113; Referee: Kevin Clancy

25 July 2017 3	Edinburgh City	1 – 2	Motherwell	Edinburgh
19:45 BST (UTC+1)	Thomson (yellow card) 60'; Grimes 69'; Mackie (yellow card) 87'	Report	Cadden 74'; Frear 89'	Stadium: Ainslie Park; Attendance: 970; Referee: Gavin Duncan

29 July 2017 4	Motherwell	1 – 0	Berwick Rangers	Motherwell
15:00 BST (UTC+1)	Frear 82'	Report	K.Stewart (yellow card) 64'	Stadium: Fir Park; Attendance: 2,524; Referee: Stephen Finnie

==== Knockout stage ====
9 August 2017 Second round	Ross County	2 – 3 (a.e.t.)	Motherwell	Dingwall
19:45 BST (UTC+1)	Schalk 65'; Dow (yellow card) 69'; Curran 104' (pen.)	Report	Bigirimana 50'; Moult (yellow card) 77'; MacLean (yellow card) 90+3' (goal) 112'; Cadden 92'; Dunne (red card) 104'	Stadium: Victoria Park; Referee: Stephen Finnie

21 September 2017 Quarter Final	Motherwell	3 – 0	Aberdeen	Motherwell
19:45 BST (UTC+1)	Moult 13', 85'; Hartley 19'; Kipré (yellow card) 42'; Hammell (yellow card) 59'; Cadden (yellow card) 77'; Grimshaw (yellow card) 87'; Fisher (yellow card) 90'	Report	Christie (yellow card) 88'	Stadium: Fir Park; Attendance: 6,430; Referee: Kevin Clancy

22 October 2017 Semi Final	Rangers	0 – 2	Motherwell	Glasgow
BST (UTC+1)	Morelos (yellow card) 58'; Herrera (yellow card) 87'	Report	Bowman (yellow card) 7'; Hartley (yellow card) 26'; Moult 52', 74' (yellow card) 87'; Cadden (yellow card) 90+2'	Stadium: Hampden Park; Attendance: 44,506; Referee: Steven McLean

==== Final ====
26 November 2017	Motherwell	0 – 2	Celtic	Glasgow
15:00 GMT (UTC)	McHugh (yellow card) 54'; Kipré (red card) 58'; Campbell (yellow card) 74'	Report	Dembélé (yellow card) 16' (goal) 60' (pen.); Forrest 49'; Brown (yellow card) 90+2'	Stadium: Hampden Park; Attendance: 49,483; Referee: Craig Thomson

=== Challenge Cup ===
16 August 2017 First Round	Motherwell Colts	2 – 1	Queen's Park	Stirling
19:30 BST (UTC+1)	L.Brown (yellow card) 27'; D.Turnbull (yellow card) 45+1'; Plummer 62'; A.Livingstone 69'; Gordon (yellow card) 88'	Report	Cummins 29'; R.Docherty (yellow card) 54'	Stadium: Forthbank Stadium; Attendance: 168; Referee: David Dickinson

2 September 2017 Second Round	Crusaders	3 – 2	Motherwell Colts	Belfast, Northern Ireland
15:00 BST (UTC+1)	Lowry 28'; Burns 84', 90+2'	Report	D.Turnbull 51'; Cushley (yellow card) 71'; Newell 67'	Stadium: Seaview; Attendance: 494; Referee: Kris Hames

== Squad statistics ==
=== Appearances ===
As of match played 19 May 2018

No.	Pos	Nat	Player	Total		Scottish Premiership		Scottish Cup		League Cup	
No.	Pos	Nat	Player	Apps	Goals	Apps	Goals	Apps	Goals	Apps	Goals
1	GK	(Northern Ireland) NIR	Trevor Carson	46	0	33	0	5	0	8	0
2	DF	(Scotland) SCO	Richard Tait	45	2	32+1	1	5	0	7	1
3	DF	(Scotland) SCO	Stephen Hendrie	7	0	3+3	0	0+1	0	0	0
4	MF	(England) ENG	Liam Grimshaw	19	0	10+5	0	2	0	1+1	0
5	MF	(Burundi) BDI	Gaël Bigirimana	35	2	11+15	1	0+3	0	4+2	1
6	DF	(England) ENG	Peter Hartley	17	3	14	2	0	0	3	1
7	MF	(Scotland) SCO	Chris Cadden	45	4	30+3	0	4	0	7+1	4
8	MF	(Republic of Ireland) IRL	Carl McHugh	46	1	32+2	0	4	1	8	0
9	FW	(England) ENG	Curtis Main	21	7	16	5	5	2	0	0
11	MF	(England) ENG	Elliott Frear	29	3	13+9	1	0+2	0	3+2	2
12	FW	(England) ENG	Ryan Bowman	41	9	22+9	6	2+1	1	5+2	2
13	GK	(England) ENG	Russell Griffiths	6	0	5+1	0	0	0	0	0
14	DF	(England) ENG	Ellis Plummer	1	0	0	0	0	0	0+1	0
15	MF	(Australia) AUS	Andy Rose	39	2	21+6	2	3+1	0	6+2	0
18	DF	(Ireland) EIR	Charles Dunne	44	1	33	0	5	0	6	1
19	DF	(Scotland) SCO	Tom Aldred	22	1	17	1	5	0	0	0
20	FW	(Lithuania) LTU	Deimantas Petravičius	13	0	1+11	0	0+1	0	0	0
21	DF	(Ivory Coast) CIV	Cédric Kipré	48	1	34+1	1	5	0	8	0
22	MF	(Scotland) SCO	Allan Campbell	35	2	24+4	2	4	0	2+1	0
23	FW	(Turkey) TUR	Nadir Çiftçi	15	3	8+3	3	3+1	0	0	0
24	FW	(England) ENG	George Newell	9	0	1+7	0	0	0	0+1	0
26	MF	(Scotland) SCO	Ross MacLean	10	1	1+6	0	0+1	0	1+1	1
27	FW	(England) ENG	Craig Tanner	35	8	15+10	6	3	1	4+3	1
31	MF	(Scotland) SCO	David Turnbull	3	0	2	0	0+1	0	0	0
33	MF	(Scotland) SCO	Liam Brown	1	0	0+1	0	0	0	0	0
34	DF	(Scotland) SCO	Barry Maguire	3	0	3	0	0	0	0	0
38	FW	(Scotland) SCO	James Scott	2	0	0+2	0	0	0	0	0
Players away from the club on loan:
Players who left Motherwell during the season:
3	DF	(Scotland) SCO	Steven Hammell	8	0	2+2	0	0+1	0	3	0
4	DF	(England) ENG	Ben Heneghan	7	1	4	1	0	0	3	0
6	DF	(Scotland) SCO	Stephen McManus	1	0	0	0	0	0	1	0
9	FW	(England) ENG	Louis Moult	22	14	13+2	8	0	0	5+2	6
17	FW	(England) ENG	Alex Fisher	19	0	6+5	0	0+1	0	2+5	0
25	DF	(Scotland) SCO	Jack McMillan	1	0	0	0	0	0	1	0

=== Goal scorers ===
As of match played 19 May 2018

Ranking	Nation	Position	Number	Name	Premiership	Scottish Cup	League Cup	Total
1	FW	(England)	9	Louis Moult	8	0	6	14
2	FW	(England)	12	Ryan Bowman	7	1	2	10
3	FW	(England)	27	Craig Tanner	6	2	1	9
4	FW	(England)	9	Curtis Main	5	2	0	7
5				Own goal	2	3	0	5
6	MF	(Scotland)	7	Chris Cadden	0	0	4	4
7	FW	(Turkey)	23	Nadir Çiftçi	3	0	0	3
7	DF	(England)	6	Peter Hartley	2	0	1	3
7	MF	(England)	11	Elliott Frear	1	0	2	3
10	MF	(Australia)	15	Andy Rose	2	0	0	2
10	MF	(Scotland)	22	Allan Campbell	2	0	0	2
10	MF	(Burundi)	5	Gaël Bigirimana	1	0	1	2
10	DF	(Scotland)	2	Richard Tait	1	0	1	2
14	DF	(England)	4	Ben Heneghan	1	0	0	1
14	DF	(Ivory Coast)	21	Cédric Kipré	1	0	0	1
14	DF	(Scotland)	19	Tom Aldred	1	0	0	1
14	MF	(Republic of Ireland)	8	Carl McHugh	0	1	0	1
14	DF	(Republic of Ireland)	18	Charles Dunne	0	0	1	1
14	MF	(Scotland)	26	Ross MacLean	0	0	1	1
TOTALS					43	9	20	72

=== Clean sheets ===
As of match played 19 May 2018

Ranking	Nation	Position	Number	Name	Premiership	Scottish Cup	League Cup	Total
1	GK	(Northern Ireland)	1	Trevor Carson	11	3	4	18
2	GK	(England)	13	Russell Griffiths	2	0	0	2
TOTALS					13	3	4	20

=== Disciplinary record ===
As of match played 19 May 2018

Number	Nation	Position	Name	Premiership		Scottish Cup		League Cup		Total	
Number	Nation	Position	Name	Yellow card	Red card	Yellow card	Red card	Yellow card	Red card	Yellow card	Red card
1	(Northern Ireland)	GK	Trevor Carson	0	1	0	0	0	0	0	1
2	(Scotland)	DF	Richard Tait	9	0	1	0	0	0	10	0
4	(England)	MF	Liam Grimshaw	3	0	1	0	1	0	5	0
5	(Burundi)	MF	Gaël Bigirimana	4	0	0	0	1	0	5	0
6	(England)	DF	Peter Hartley	2	1	0	0	2	0	4	1
7	(Scotland)	MF	Chris Cadden	0	0	0	0	2	0	2	0
8	(Republic of Ireland)	MF	Carl McHugh	14	1	2	0	0	0	16	1
9	(England)	FW	Curtis Main	2	0	0	0	0	0	2	0
11	(England)	MF	Elliott Frear	1	0	0	0	0	0	1	0
12	(England)	FW	Ryan Bowman	2	0	0	0	1	0	3	0
15	(Australia)	MF	Andy Rose	3	0	0	0	0	0	3	0
18	(Republic of Ireland)	DF	Charles Dunne	4	1	0	0	0	1	4	2
19	(Scotland)	DF	Tom Aldred	0	0	1	0	0	0	1	0
21	(Ivory Coast)	DF	Cédric Kipré	9	1	1	0	1	1	11	2
22	(Scotland)	MF	Allan Campbell	6	0	2	0	1	0	9	0
23	(Turkey)	FW	Nadir Çiftçi	2	0	1	0	0	0	3	0
26	(Scotland)	MF	Ross MacLean	1	0	0	0	1	0	2	0
27	(England)	FW	Craig Tanner	2	0	1	0	0	0	3	0
Players who left Motherwell during the season:
3	(Scotland)	DF	Steven Hammell	1	0	0	0	1	0	2	0
4	(England)	DF	Ben Heneghan	2	0	0	0	0	0	2	0
9	(England)	FW	Louis Moult	3	0	0	0	2	0	5	0
17	(England)	FW	Alex Fisher	0	0	0	0	1	0	1	0
			TOTALS	70	5	10	0	14	2	94	7

== See also ==
- List of Motherwell F.C. seasons
