= Ayo Obileye =

English footballer (born 1994)

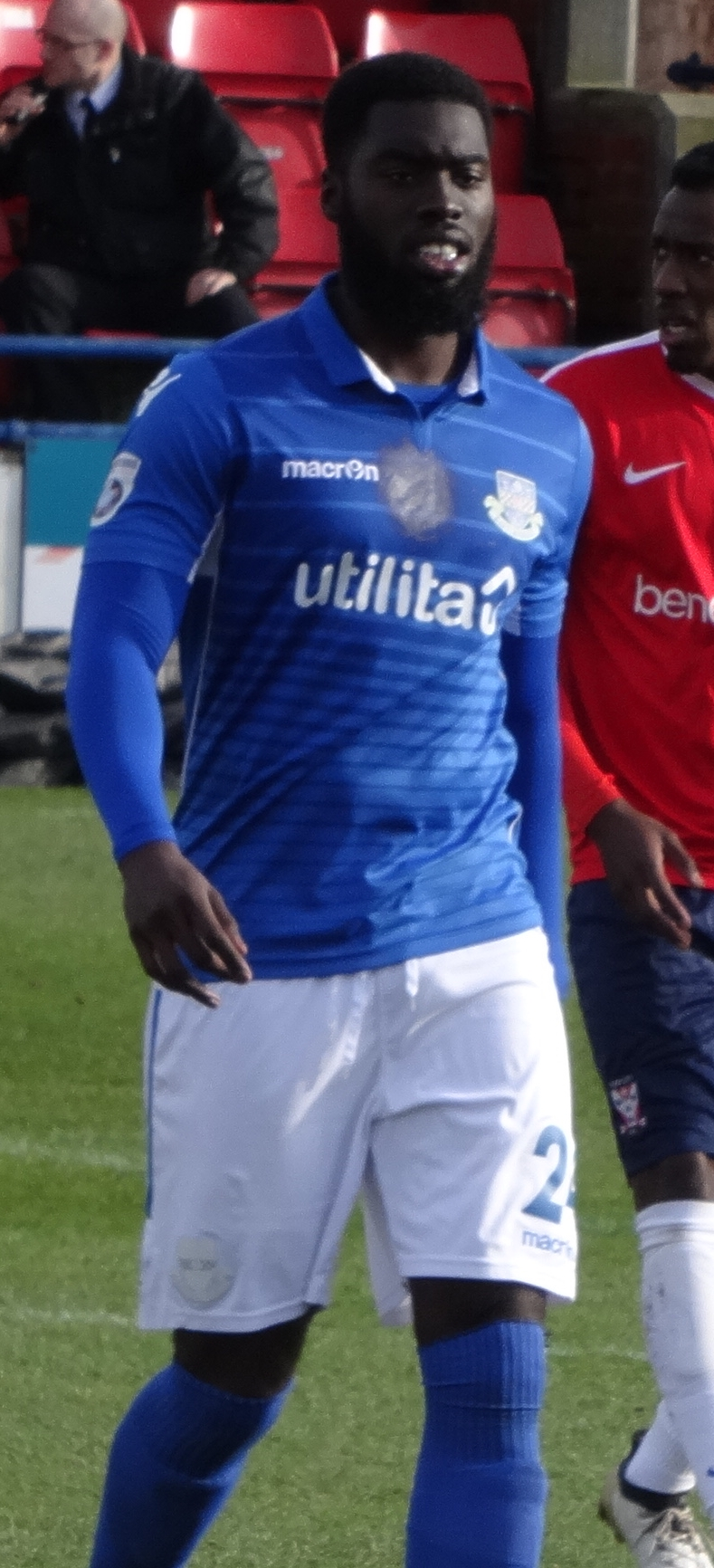
- Obileye playing for Eastleigh in 2017

Personal information
- Full name: Stephen Ayomide Obileye
- Date of birth: 2 September 1994 (age 32)
- Place of birth: Homerton, England
- Height: 1.95 m (6 ft 5 in)
- Positions: Defender; defensive midfielder

Team information
- Current team: Gnistan
- Number: 67

Youth career
- 2008–2010: Leyton Orient
- 2010–2011: Chelsea
- 2011–2013: Sheffield Wednesday

Senior career*
Years	Team	Apps	(Gls)
2011–2014	Sheffield Wednesday	0	(0)
2014–2016	Charlton Athletic	0	(0)
2014–2015	→ Dagenham & Redbridge (loan)	26	(2)
2015–2016	→ Dagenham & Redbridge (loan)	16	(0)
2016–2018	Eastleigh	50	(10)
2016	→ Dover Athletic (loan)	3	(0)
2018–2019	Maidenhead United	37	(4)
2019–2020	Ebbsfleet United	27	(3)
2020–2021	Queen of the South	27	(9)
2021–2024	Livingston	89	(5)
2024	Cangzhou Mighty Lions	15	(2)
2025	SJK	18	(2)
2026–	Gnistan	30	(3)
- * Club domestic league appearances and goals as of 13 November 2026

Stephen Ayomide "Ayo" Obileye (born 2 September 1994) is an English professional footballer who plays as a defender for Veikkausliiga club Gnistan. He has previously played for Sheffield Wednesday, Charlton Athletic, Eastleigh, Dover Athletic, Maidenhead United, Ebbsfleet United, Queen of the South, Livingston, Cangzhou Mighty Lions, and SJK.

== Early life ==
Obileye was born in Homerton University Hospital in the London Borough of Hackney to Nigerian parents.

== Career ==
Obileye started his career in the youth system at Leyton Orient, before joining Chelsea as a schoolboy. He stayed with the club until 2011, but failed to earn a scholarship with the club. In 2011, he moved north to sign a two-year scholarship with the academy at Sheffield Wednesday. He made his professional debut at the age of 16 in August 2011, starting in the 0–0 draw with Yorkshire rivals Bradford City at Valley Parade in the EFL Trophy, which Bradford went on to win on penalties. He was made captain of the Development Squad for the 2012–13 season, and was awarded with his first professional contract for the club in May 2013, signing a one-year deal on completion of his scholarship. In March 2014, he was linked with moves away from the club as he wanted to return to his London roots, and spent a short time training with Premier League side Crystal Palace. In May 2014, he left Sheffield Wednesday at the end of his contract having only made one first team appearance, turning down a new deal.

In October 2014, he signed for EFL Championship side Charlton Athletic after impressing on trial, and was placed in the U21 Development Squad. He initially signed on a short-term deal, but in November 2014 his contract was extended until June 2015. Later in the month he signed for Football League Two side Dagenham & Redbridge on a one-month youth loan deal. As part of the loan agreement he was still eligible to play for Charton's U21 Development Squad. He made his debut on the same day, coming on as a substitute for Damian Batt in the 1–0 away defeat to AFC Wimbledon. In December 2014, his loan was extended for a further month, having made four appearances for the Daggers. He continued to have a positive impact in the Daggers back-line and in January 2015 his loan was again extended for a further month. He continued to remain a permanent fixture in the Daggers defence, extending his stay in February 2015 until the end of the season. He returned to Charlton in May 2015, having made 26 appearances for the Daggers, scoring twice.

In August 2015, he returned to Dagenham & Redbridge on loan until January 2016, after a successful loan the previous season.

Obileye had a two-year spell at Eastleigh from 2016 to 2018, scoring 11 goals in 53 games in all competitions. He joined Maidenhead United for the 2018–19 season.

On 4 June 2019, Obileye joined Ebbsfleet United.

On 9 September 2020, Obileye signed for Scottish Championship club Queen of the South on a one-year contract. Despite playing in a defensive role, Obileye scored 9 league goals during the 2020–21 season, finishing second top goalscorer for the Doonhamers behind Connor Shields with 11 goals (8 league and 3 cup) and he was also second top goalscorer alongside three other players in the Scottish Championship, all behind Liam Boyce of Hearts with 14 goals.

On 6 May 2021, Obileye signed a pre-contract agreement with Livingston, agreeing a two-year contract, with a further one-year option. Livingston won the chase from other Scottish Premiership clubs for his signature.

Following his departure from Livingston, Obileye signed for Cangzhou Mighty Lions in the Chinese Super League in June 2024. He made his debut on 26 June 2024 against Beijing Guoan. After making 15 appearances and scoring two goals, Obileye was forced to leave Cangzhou when they were expelled from the Chinese Super League.

On 24 May 2025, Obileye joined Finnish Veikkausliiga club SJK Seinäjoki on a deal for the remainder of the season, to strengthen their injury-weakened defence.

On 12 January 2026, Obileye joined fellow Veikkausliiga club Gnistan on a one-year contract.

== Career statistics ==
As of match played 9 May 2026

Appearances and goals by club, season and competition
Club	Season	League			National cup (Note: Includes FA Cup, Scottish Cup and Finnish Cup)		League cup (Note: Includes EFL League Cup, Scottish League Cup and Finnish League Cup)		Continental		Other		Total	
Club	Season	Division	Apps	Goals	Apps	Goals	Apps	Goals	Apps	Goals	Apps	Goals	Apps	Goals
Sheffield Wednesday	2011–12	League One	0	0	0	0	0	0	—		1 (Note: Appearance in Football League Trophy)	0	1	0
Sheffield Wednesday	2012–13	Championship	0	0	0	0	0	0	—		—		0	0
Sheffield Wednesday	2013–14	Championship	0	0	0	0	0	0	—		—		0	0
Sheffield Wednesday	Total		0	0	0	0	0	0	—		1	0	1	0
Charlton Athletic	2014–15	Championship	0	0	0	0	0	0	—		—		0	0
Charlton Athletic	2015–16	Championship	0	0	0	0	0	0	—		—		0	0
Charlton Athletic	Total		0	0	0	0	0	0	—		—		0	0
Dagenham & Redbridge (loan)	2014–15	League Two	26	2	0	0	0	0	—		0	0	26	2
Dagenham & Redbridge (loan)	2015–16	League Two	16	0	2	1	0	0	—		3	0	21	1
Dagenham & Redbridge (loan)	Total		42	2	2	1	0	0	—		3	0	47	3
Eastleigh	2016–17	National League	16	3	3	1	—		–		0	0	19	4
Eastleigh	2017–18	National League	34	7	0	0	—		–		0	0	34	7
Eastleigh	Total		50	10	3	1	—		—		0	0	53	11
Dover Athletic (loan)	2016–17	National League	3	0	0	0	—		—		0	0	3	0
Maidenhead United	2018–19	National League	37	4	3	0	—		—		1 (Note: Appearance in FA Trophy)	0	41	4
Ebbsfleet United	2019–20	National League	27	3	2	0	—		—		3	1	32	4
Queen of the South	2020–21	Scottish Championship	27	9	2	0	4	0	—		—		33	9
Livingston	2021–22	Scottish Premiership	34	4	2	1	6	1	—		—		42	6
Livingston	2022–23	Scottish Premiership	25	1	2	0	3	1	—		—		30	2
Livingston	2023–24	Scottish Premiership	30	0	2	0	6	1	—		—		38	1
Livingston	Total		89	5	6	1	15	3	—		—		110	9
Cangzhou Mighty Lions	2024	Chinese Super League	15	2	—		—		—		–		15	2
SJK Seinäjoki	2025	Veikkausliiga	18	2	2	0	0	0	0	0	—		20	2
Gnistan	2026	Veikkausliiga	6	0	0	0	3	0	0	0	—		9	0
Career total			314	37	21	3	22	3	0	0	8	1	365	44
