= 2018 Scottish Cup final =

2018 Scottish Cup Final
- Event: 2017–18 Scottish Cup
Celtic	Motherwell
2	0
- Date: 19 May 2018
- Venue: Hampden Park, Glasgow
- Man of the Match: Moussa Dembele
- Referee: Kevin Clancy
- Attendance: 49,967

The 2018 Scottish Cup Final was the 133rd final of the Scottish Cup and the final of the 2017–18 Scottish Cup, the most prestigious knockout football competition in Scotland. The match took place at Hampden Park on 19 May 2018 and was contested by Celtic and Motherwell.

The fixture was a repeat of the finals in 1931, 1933, 1951 and 2011, all of which were won by Celtic. It was also a repeat of the League Cup final earlier in the same season, which Celtic won 2–0.

Celtic completed a successive domestic treble ("double treble"), a feat which had not previously been achieved in Scottish football.

== Route to the final ==
Round	Opposition	Location	Score
Celtic
Fourth round	Brechin City	Celtic Park	5–0
Fifth round	Partick Thistle	Celtic Park	3–2
Quarter-final	Greenock Morton	Celtic Park	3–0
Semi-final	Rangers	Hampden Park	4–0
Motherwell
Fourth round	Hamilton Academical	Fir Park	2–0
Fifth round	Dundee	Dens Park	2–0
Quarter-final	Heart of Midlothian	Fir Park	2–1
Semi-final	Aberdeen	Hampden Park	3–0

== Match ==
=== Summary ===
Callum McGregor opened the scoring for Celtic after 11 minutes with a right foot half volley from the edge of the penalty area into the left corner of the net after the ball broke to him. Olivier Ntcham made it 2–0 after 25 minutes with a low right foot finish to the left corner of the net after a pass from Moussa Dembélé.

=== Details ===
19 May 2018
15:00

Celtic	2–0	Motherwell
McGregor 11'; Ntcham 25'	Report

Hampden Park, Glasgow
Attendance: 49,967
Referee: Kevin Clancy

Celtic	Motherwell

GK	1	(Scotland) Craig Gordon
DF	23	(Sweden) Mikael Lustig
DF	20	(Belgium) Dedryck Boyata	(yellow card) 79'
DF	35	(Norway) Kristoffer Ajer		(substituted off) 76'
DF	63	(Scotland) Kieran Tierney
MF	8	(Scotland) Scott Brown (c)
MF	21	(France) Olivier Ntcham
MF	49	(Scotland) James Forrest		(substituted off) 90'
MF	18	(Australia) Tom Rogić		(substituted off) 72'
MF	42	(Scotland) Callum McGregor
FW	10	(France) Moussa Dembélé
Substitutes:
GK	29	(Scotland) Scott Bain
DF	5	(Croatia) Jozo Šimunović		(substituted on) 76'
MF	7	(England) Patrick Roberts
FW	9	(Scotland) Leigh Griffiths
MF	11	(England) Scott Sinclair		(substituted on) 90'
MF	14	(Scotland) Stuart Armstrong		(substituted on) 72'
MF	88	(Ivory Coast) Eboue Kouassi
Manager:
(Northern Ireland) Brendan Rodgers

GK	1	(Northern Ireland) Trevor Carson
DF	21	(Ivory Coast) Cédric Kipré
DF	19	(Scotland) Tom Aldred
DF	18	(Republic of Ireland) Charles Dunne
MF	7	(Scotland) Chris Cadden
MF	22	(Scotland) Allan Campbell	(yellow card) 62'	(substituted off) 78'
MF	8	(Republic of Ireland) Carl McHugh (c)		(substituted off) 56'
MF	4	(England) Liam Grimshaw	(yellow card) 44'
MF	2	(Scotland) Richard Tait	(yellow card) 36'
FW	9	(England) Curtis Main
FW	12	(England) Ryan Bowman
Substitutes:
GK	13	(England) Russell Griffiths
MF	5	(Burundi) Gaël Bigirimana		(substituted on) 56'
DF	6	(England) Peter Hartley
MF	11	(England) Elliott Frear		(substituted on) 78'
FW	20	(Lithuania) Deimantas Petravičius
MF	31	(Scotland) David Turnbull
DF	34	(Scotland) Barry Maguire
Manager:
(Northern Ireland) Stephen Robinson

Match rules

- 90 minutes
- 30 minutes of extra time if necessary
- Penalty shoot-out if scores still level
- Seven named substitutes
- Maximum of three substitutions in normal time (a fourth substitution may be made in extra time)
