= 2017 Scottish League Cup final =

- Event: 2017–18 Scottish League Cup
Motherwell	Celtic
0	2
- Date: 26 November 2017
- Venue: Hampden Park, Glasgow
- Referee: Craig Thomson
- Attendance: 49,483
- Weather: Overcast

The 2017 Scottish League Cup final was the 72nd final of the Scottish League Cup and took place on 26 November 2017 at Hampden Park, Glasgow. The clubs contesting the final were Motherwell and Celtic. Celtic won the match 2–0, winning their 17th League Cup title.

== Route to the final ==
=== Motherwell ===
Round	Opposition	Score
Group stage	Queen's Park	5–1 (a)
Group stage	Greenock Morton	4–0 (h)
Group stage	Edinburgh City	2–1 (a)
Group stage	Berwick Rangers	1–0 (h)
Second round	Ross County	3–2 (a.e.t.) (a)
Quarter-final	Aberdeen	3–0 (h)
Semi-final	Rangers	2–0 (n)

Motherwell won Group F to qualify for the second round, winning all four games against Queen's Park, Greenock Morton, Edinburgh City and Berwick Rangers.

Motherwell were seeded for the second round draw and were drawn to face Group D runners-up Ross County away from home on 9 August. The Steelmen required extra time to see off a spirited home side, with Ross MacLean scoring the decisive goal eight minutes from the final whistle

Stephen Robinson's faced Aberdeen at Fir Park in the quarter-finals on 21 September. A Peter Hartley header, bookended by a Louis Moult double, secured Motherwell's place in the semi-finals.

Rangers provided the opposition at Hampden Park on 22 October. In a match filled with controversial refereeing decisions, another brace from Louis Moult sent Motherwell to the final.

=== Celtic ===
Round	Opposition	Score
Second round	Kilmarnock	5–0 (h)
Quarter-final	Dundee	4–0 (a)
Semi-final	Hibernian	4–2 (n)

As Celtic participated in European competition, they received a bye through the 2017–18 Scottish League Cup group stage. The holders were seeded for the second round draw and were drawn at home to face Group E runners-up Kilmarnock on 8 August. A brace from Leigh Griffiths and goals from Anthony Ralston, Kieran Tierney and Stuart Armstrong secured a 5–0 victory.

Celtic visited Dundee in the quarter-finals on 20 September. The Dark Blues were unable to contain Brendan Rodgers' side, with James Forrest, Scott Sinclair and Callum McGregor all on the scoresheet in a 4–0 win.

Celtic faced Hibernian in the semi-final at Hampden Park on 21 October. Two goals each from Mikael Lustig and Moussa Dembélé booked Celtic's place in the 2017 final, presenting the Bhoys with the opportunity to defend the trophy.

== Match ==
=== Summary ===
Following a goalless first half, James Forrest gave Celtic the lead four minutes after the interval, controlling a Callum McGregor pass before curling the ball with his left foot into the far left corner of the net. On the hour mark, Craig Thomson awarded the Glasgow side a controversial penalty after Cédric Kipré was adjudged to have fouled Scott Sinclair. The French defender was red-carded and compatriot Moussa Dembélé converted the resultant penalty, shooting low to the centre of the net to secure back-to-back League Cup triumphs for the Scottish champions.

=== Details ===
26 November 2017
15:00

Motherwell	0–2	Celtic
	SPFL Report	Forrest 49'; Dembélé 60' (pen.)

Hampden Park, Glasgow
Attendance: 49,483
Referee: Craig Thomson

Motherwell	Celtic

GK	1	(Northern Ireland) Trevor Carson
RB	2	(Scotland) Richard Tait
CB	6	(England) Peter Hartley
CB	21	(Ivory Coast) Cédric Kipré	(red card) 58'
LB	18	(Republic of Ireland) Charles Dunne
CM	4	(England) Liam Grimshaw	(substituted off) 51'
CM	8	(Republic of Ireland) Carl McHugh (c) (yellow card) 54'
CM	15	(Australia) Andy Rose	(substituted off) 70'
AM	7	(Scotland) Chris Cadden
FW	9	(England) Louis Moult
FW	12	(England) Ryan Bowman	(substituted off) 64'
Substitutes:
GK	13	(England) Russell Griffiths
DF	3	(Scotland) Steven Hammell
MF	11	(England) Elliott Frear	(substituted on) 70'
FW	17	(England) Alex Fisher
FW	20	(Lithuania) Deimantas Petravičius
MF	22	(Scotland) Allan Campbell (yellow card) 74'	(substituted on) 64'
FW	27	(England) Craig Tanner	(substituted on) 51'
Manager:
(Northern Ireland) Stephen Robinson

GK	1	(Scotland) Craig Gordon
RB	23	(Sweden) Mikael Lustig
CB	5	(Croatia) Jozo Šimunović
CB	20	(Belgium) Dedryck Boyata
LB	63	(Scotland) Kieran Tierney
CM	8	(Scotland) Scott Brown (c) (yellow card) 90+2'
CM	14	(Scotland) Stuart Armstrong
AM	49	(Scotland) James Forrest	(substituted off) 78'
AM	42	(Scotland) Callum McGregor	(substituted off) 89'
AM	11	(England) Scott Sinclair
FW	10	(France) Moussa Dembélé (yellow card) 16'	(substituted off) 64'
Substitutes:
GK	24	(Netherlands) Dorus de Vries
MF	7	(England) Patrick Roberts	(substituted on) 78'
FW	9	(Scotland) Leigh Griffiths	(substituted on) 64'
MF	18	(Australia) Tom Rogic	(substituted on) 89'
MF	21	(France) Olivier Ntcham
DF	28	(Denmark) Erik Sviatchenko
DF	35	(Norway) Kristoffer Ajer
Manager:
(Northern Ireland) Brendan Rodgers

Match officials

- Referee: Craig Thomson

Match rules

- 90 minutes
- 30 minutes of extra-time if necessary
- Penalty shoot-out if scores still level
- Seven named substitutes
- Maximum of three substitutions

== See also ==
Played between same teams:

- 2018 Scottish Cup Final
