= Rohan Ferguson =

Scottish footballer (born 1997)

- Ferguson with Larne in 2026

Personal information
- Date of birth: 6 December 1997 (age 28)
- Place of birth: Bathgate, Scotland
- Height: 1.89 m (6 ft 2 in)
- Position: Goalkeeper

Team information
- Current team: Larne
- Number: 1

Youth career
- 2007–2008: Heart of Midlothian
- 2008–2009: Dundee United
- 2011–2013: Bathgate Thistle

Senior career*
Years	Team	Apps	(Gls)
2013–2017	Airdrieonians	41	(0)
2017–2020	Motherwell	1	(0)
2017–2018	→ Airdrieonians (loan)	24	(0)
2019–2020	→ Linfield (loan)	30	(0)
2020–2021	Queen of the South	21	(0)
2021–	Larne	172	(0)
- * Club domestic league appearances and goals as of 29 April 2026

Rohan Ferguson (born 6 December 1997) is a Scottish footballer who plays as a goalkeeper for NIFL Premiership club Larne, having previously played for Airdrieonians, Motherwell, Queen of the South and Linfield on loan.

== Career ==
=== Airdrieonians ===
After stepping out the pro-youth system for several years to play for Scottish Juniors club Bathgate Thistle, Ferguson then signed for Airdrieonians on 15 August 2013.

Ferguson formed part of the Diamonds youth team before making his first-team debut, at the age of seventeen, on the last day of the 2014-15 season versus Dunfermline at the Excelsior Stadium. Although considered back-up keeper to Airdrie's number one keeper Neil Parry in the 2015-16 season, his reputation was growing and on the eve of the Diamonds Scottish Cup 4th round match with Dundee United in January 2016, the Tannadice club launched a bid for the player that was rejected by the Diamonds.

The Terrors had a further bid rejected before another of Ferguson's former clubs, Hearts showed interest, as Ferguson spent time on trial with the Tynecastle club, as Airdrie's manager Eddie Wolecki Black said: "Rohan is recognised now as one of the hottest young prospects in the game. He sparkled in our recent 1–0 Scottish Cup defeat by Dundee United and relished the experience of training with Hearts. We will need to see what develops in the months to come."

Ferguson then signed a new two-year contract, as Airdrie turned full-time and with Parry no longer at the club, Ferguson was the new number one keeper for the 2016-17 season, as he won the League One player of the month award for November 2016. Fergsuon completed the season with the Diamonds having played 45 matches but couldn't help his club to promotion after they lost to Alloa in the play-off semi final.

=== Motherwell ===
On Friday 18 August 2017, Ferguson signed for Motherwell on a three-year contract, although he was immediately sent back out on loan to Airdrie for the remainder of the 2017–2018 season. Youngsters Jake Hastie and Luke Watt were also sent out on loan to Airdrie as part of the deal. Ferguson played a further 24 matches for Airdrie on loan and ended up with 80 appearances for the Diamonds.

Ferguson's first competitive match for Motherwell was in the Scottish Challenge Cup, appearing for Well's Colts team versus East Stirlingshire at the Falkirk Stadium. On 3 April 2019, Ferguson debuted for the first-team, appearing as a substitute for the injured Mark Gillespie in a 3–1 defeat versus Aberdeen.

=== Linfield (Loan spell) ===
On 19 July 2019, Ferguson moved out on loan to Linfield for the entire 2019–20 season. Ferguson was released by Motherwell in May 2020.

=== Queen of the South ===
On 17 September 2020, Ferguson signed a one-year deal with Scottish Championship club Queen of the South.

=== Larne ===
On 8 June 2021, Ferguson signed a one-year deal with NIFL Premiership club Larne. He helped Larne to become the first Irish Football League team to qualify for the Europa Conference League in the 2024/25 season, after beating Lincoln Red Imps on aggregate.

== Career statistics ==
As of 24 April 2021

Club	Season	League			National Cup		League Cup		Other		Total	
Club	Season	Division	Apps	Goals	Apps	Goals	Apps	Goals	Apps	Goals	Apps	Goals
Airdrieonians	2014–15	Scottish League One	1	0	0	0	0	0	0	0	1	0
Airdrieonians	2015–16	Scottish League One	2	0	1	0	0	0	0	0	3	0
Airdrieonians	2016–17	Scottish League One	36	0	1	0	4	0	4 (Note: Two appearances in the Scottish Challenge Cup & two appearances in the Scottish Championship play-offs.)	0	45	0
Airdrieonians	2017–18	Scottish League One	2	0	0	0	4	0	1 (Note: Appearance in the Scottish Challenge Cup)	0	7	0
Airdrieonians	Total		41	0	2	0	8	0	5	0	56	0
Motherwell	2017–18	Scottish Premiership	0	0	0	0	0	0	0	0	0	0
Motherwell	2018–19	Scottish Premiership	1	0	0	0	0	0	2 (Note: Appearances for Motherwell under-21s in the Scottish Challenge Cup in which age-restricted sides from the Scottish Premiership clubs compete against senior clubs.)	0	3	0
Motherwell	2019–20	Scottish Premiership	0	0	0	0	0	0	0	0	0	0
Motherwell	Total		1	0	0	0	0	0	2	0	3	0
Airdrieonians (loan)	2017–18	Scottish League One	24	0	0	0	0	0	0	0	24	0
Linfield (loan)	2019–20	NIFL Premiership	30	0	0	0	1	0	7 (Note: Six appearances in the UEFA Europa League and one appearance in the Champions Cup)	0	38	0
Queen of the South	2020–21	Scottish Championship	21	0	2	0	3	0	0	0	26	0
Career total			117	0	4	0	12	0	14	0	147	0

== Honours ==
Linfield

- NIFL Premiership: 2019–20

Larne

- NIFL Premiership (3): 2022-23, 2023-24

2025-26

- County Antrim Shield (3): 2021-22, 2022-23, 2023-24
- NIFL Charity Shield (2): 2024, 2026

Individual

- NIFL Premiership Team of the Season (3): 2022-23, 2023-24, 2025-26
- Ulster Footballer of the Year 2025-26
- Northern Ireland Football Writer's Association Team of The Year 2025-26
