= Allan Campbell (footballer) =

Scottish footballer (born 1998)

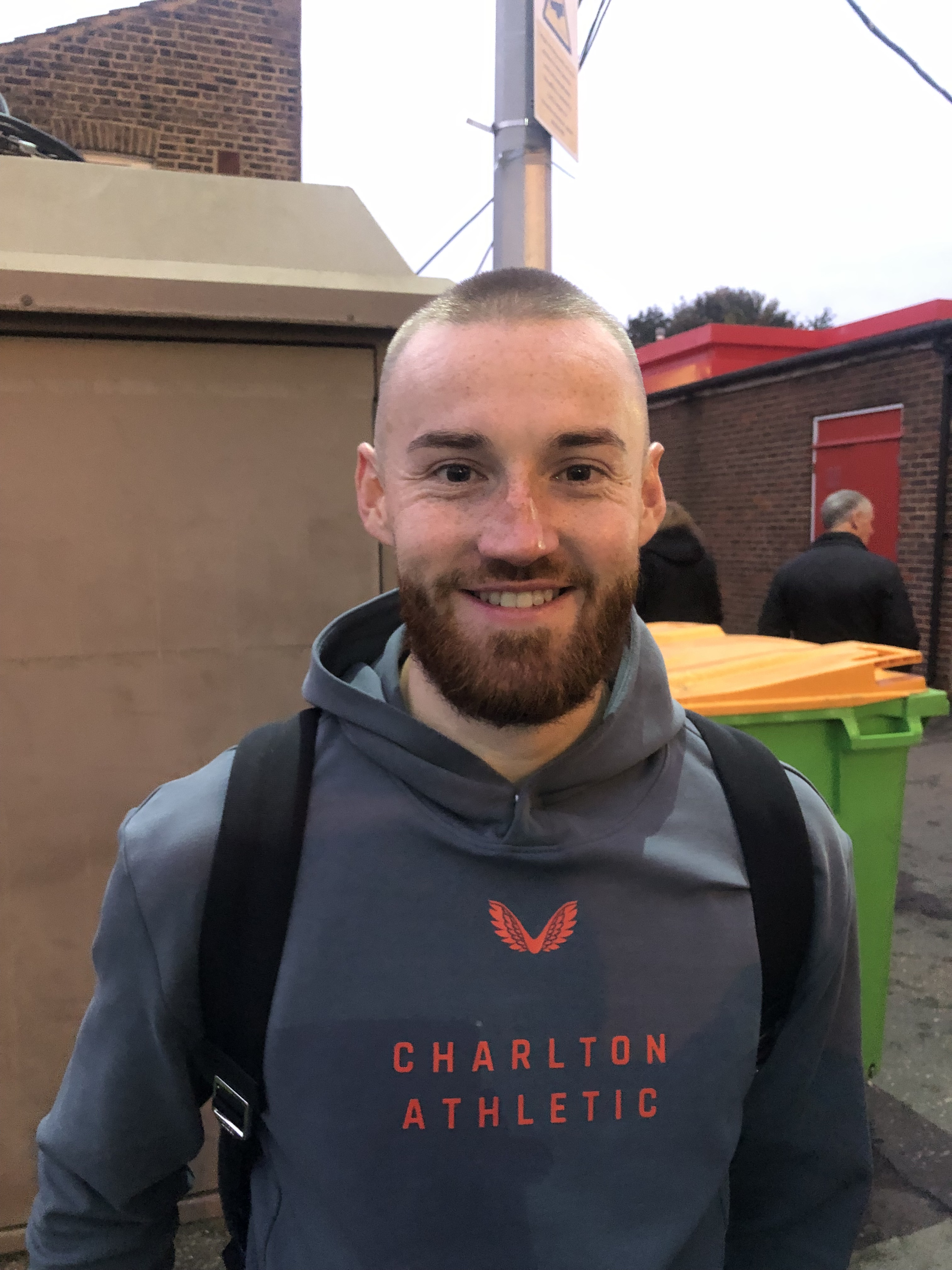
- Allan Campbell in 2024.

Personal information
- Full name: Allan Campbell
- Date of birth: 4 July 1998 (age 28)
- Place of birth: Glasgow, Scotland
- Height: 1.75 m (5 ft 9 in)
- Position: Midfielder

Team information
- Current team: St Mirren
- Number: 16

Youth career
- 2008–2016: Motherwell

Senior career*
Years	Team	Apps	(Gls)
2016–2021	Motherwell	135	(14)
2021–2025	Luton Town	75	(7)
2023–2024	→ Millwall (loan)	12	(0)
2024–2025	→ Charlton Athletic (loan)	12	(0)
2025	Dundee United	13	(0)
2026	St Mirren	14	(0)

International career^{‡}
2017–2020	Scotland U21	24	(1)
2022	Scotland	1	(0)
- * Club domestic league appearances and goals as of 20 May 2026 ‡ National team caps and goals as of 17:10, 3 May 2025 (UTC)

Allan Campbell (born 4 July 1998) is a Scottish footballer who plays as a midfielder for St Mirren. He has previously played for Motherwell, Luton Town, Millwall, Charlton Athletic and Dundee United. Campbell was selected 24 times for the Scotland under-21 team and made his full international debut for Scotland in June 2022.

== Club career ==
=== Motherwell ===
Campbell was born in Glasgow and attended All Saints Roman Catholic Secondary School in the city. He is a product of the Motherwell Academy having joined the club at the age of 10.

On 29 October 2016, Campbell made his debut for Motherwell as a substitute in a 4–1 win against Ross County. On 15 April 2017, he scored his first senior goal, the fourth in a 4–2 win over Inverness Caledonian Thistle, picking up the man of the match award at the same time.

On 13 October 2017, Campbell signed a new contract, keeping him at Motherwell until 2021. His contract was later improved, but not extended. During the 2017–18 season he took part in the 2017 Scottish League Cup Final (as a substitute) and the 2018 Scottish Cup Final (as a starter), both occasions ending in 2–0 losses to Celtic.

On 12 September 2020, he scored the only goal of a Scottish Premiership match against St Johnstone. In May 2021 the Motherwell manager Graham Alexander said that Campbell would leave the club at the end of the season, as a final effort to negotiate a new contract had failed.

=== Luton Town ===
On 15 June 2021, Luton Town announced the signing of Campbell after agreeing an undisclosed fee with Motherwell to secure his signature before his contract expired. Campbell helped Luton win promotion to the Premier League during the 2022–23 season. His last goal for the club was a memorable one, scoring against Watford to complete a 2-0 derby day victory.

==== Millwall (loan) ====
On 1 September 2023, Luton loaned Campbell to EFL Championship club Millwall.

==== Charlton Athletic (loan) ====
On 26 August 2024, Campbell joined Charlton Athletic on a season-long loan.

On 30 January 2025, Campbell's loan was terminated early.

=== Dundee United ===
On 30 January 2025, Campbell made the permanent move back to Scotland with Scottish Premiership side Dundee United, signing a short-term deal.

=== St Mirren ===
After several months without a club, Campbell signed a short-term contract with St Mirren in January 2026.

== International career ==
In September 2017, Campbell was named in the Scotland under-21 squad for the first time ahead of the European Under-21 Championship qualifying matches against England and Latvia. He made his debut on 6 October 2017, against England. Campbell scored one goal for the Scotland under-21 team, in a 1–0 win against Lithuania in September 2020.

Selected for the Scotland under-21 squad in the 2018 Toulon Tournament, the team lost to Turkey in a penalty-out and finished fourth.

On 28 May 2022, Campbell received his first call-up to the senior national team as a replacement for the injured Ryan Jack. Campbell made his full international debut on 14 June 2022, appearing as a substitute in a 4–1 win against Armenia.

== Career statistics ==
As of matches played 25 May 2026

Appearances and goals by club, season and competition
Club	Season	League			National cup (Note: Includes Scottish Cup, FA Cup)		League cup (Note: Includes Scottish League Cup, EFL Cup)		Other		Total	
Club	Season	Division	Apps	Goals	Apps	Goals	Apps	Goals	Apps	Goals	Apps	Goals
Motherwell	2016–17	Scottish Premiership	7	1	0	0	0	0	—		7	1
Motherwell	2017–18	Scottish Premiership	29	2	4	0	3	0	—		36	2
Motherwell	2018–19	Scottish Premiership	35	2	0	0	5	0	—		40	2
Motherwell	2019–20	Scottish Premiership	30	5	3	1	4	0	—		37	6
Motherwell	2020–21	Scottish Premiership	34	4	3	1	0	0	3 (Note: Appearances in the UEFA Europa League)	0	40	5
Motherwell	Total		135	14	10	2	12	0	3	0	160	16
Motherwell U20/U21 (Note: Matches in the Scottish Challenge Cup, in which age-restricted teams from the SPFL Premiership clubs compete against senior clubs.)	2016–17		—						2	0	2	0
Motherwell U20/U21	2017–18		—						1	0	1	0
Motherwell U20/U21	Total		0	0	0	0	0	0	3	0	3	0
Luton Town	2021–22	Championship	33	4	3	0	1	0	2 (Note: Appearances in Championship play-offs)	0	39	4
Luton Town	2022–23	Championship	42	3	4	0	0	0	1	0	47	3
Luton Town	2023–24	Premier League	0	0	0	0	0	0	0	0	0	0
Luton Town	2024–25	Championship	0	0	0	0	0	0	0	0	0	0
Luton Town	Total		75	7	7	0	1	0	3	0	86	7
Millwall (loan)	2023–24	Championship	12	0	0	0	0	0	0	0	12	0
Charlton Athletic (loan)	2024–25	League One	12	0	2	0	0	0	3 (Note: Appearances in the EFL Trophy)	0	17	0
Dundee United	2024–25	Scottish Premiership	13	0	—		—		—		13	0
St Mirren	2025–26	Scottish Premiership	12	0	1	0	0	0	2 (Note: Appearances in Scottish Premiership play-offs)	0	15	0
Career total			259	21	20	2	13	0	14	0	306	23

== Honours ==
Luton Town

- EFL Championship play-offs: 2023
