= Ellis Plummer =

English footballer

Personal information
- Full name: Ellis Kane Plummer
- Date of birth: 2 September 1994 (age 32)
- Place of birth: Audenshaw, England
- Position: Centre back

Youth career
- Stockport County
- 2006–2013: Manchester City

Senior career*
Years	Team	Apps	(Gls)
2013–2017	Manchester City	0	(0)
2013	→ Oldham Athletic (loan)	3	(0)
2014–2015	→ St Mirren (loan)	6	(0)
2017–2018	Motherwell	0	(0)
Total		9	(0)

International career
2010	England U16	4	(0)
2010	England U17	6	(0)
- * Club domestic league appearances and goals

Ellis Kane Plummer (born 2 September 1994) is an English retired footballer who played as a defender. He began his career at Manchester City, but never made an appearance for the club. During his time there he had loan spells with Oldham Athletic and St Mirren. After leaving Manchester City in 2017, Plummer played for Motherwell. In September 2019, he announced his retirement from football due to injury.

== Career ==
=== Manchester City ===
Starting his academy training at Stockport County, Plummer joined Manchester City at the age of 11 in 2006. After graduating to Manchester City's Elite Development Squad, he gained his first senior-level experience with a loan to League One side Oldham Athletic. During his 2012–13 season Plummer was nominated for the Academy Player of the Year award as recognition for his impressive form both at home, and in Europe. After being loaned out on 28 November 2013, he was placed in the starting line-up for Oldham's game on 1 December, playing 64 minutes before being substituted to prevent him from risking a second yellow card for persistent fouling.

Plummer was released by Manchester City after the 2016–17 season, having not played a game for the first team.

==== St Mirren (loan) ====
On 2 July 2014, it was announced that Plummer had signed for Scottish Premiership club, St Mirren, on a one-year loan deal. Plummer was restricted to just seven appearances for Saints due to injuries, and as such his one-year loan was cut short on 2 January 2015.

=== Motherwell ===
Plummer joined Motherwell on 2 August 2017 on a 1-year deal. He was released by Motherwell at the end of his contract.

=== Retirement ===
On his 25th birthday, 2 September 2019, Plummer announced that he had been forced into retirement after battling with injuries for several years. He moved into business with his own clothing company.

== Career statistics ==
As of 18 August 2017

Appearances and goals by club, season and competition
Club	Season	League		National Cup		League Cup		Other		Total	
Club	Season	Apps	Goals	Apps	Goals	Apps	Goals	Apps	Goals	Apps	Goals
Manchester City	2013–14	0	0	0	0	0	0	0	0	0	0
Manchester City	2014–15	0	0	0	0	0	0	0	0	0	0
Manchester City	2015–16	0	0	0	0	0	0	0	0	0	0
Manchester City	2016–17	0	0	0	0	0	0	0	0	0	0
Manchester City	Total	0	0	0	0	0	0	0	0	0	0
Oldham Athletic (loan)	2013–14	3	0	1	0	0	0	0	0	4	0
St Mirren (loan)	2014–15	6	0	0	0	1	0	0	0	7	0
Motherwell	2017–18	0	0	0	0	1	0	1 (Note: Appearance for Motherwell under-20s in the Scottish Challenge Cup)	1	2	1
Career total		9	0	1	0	2	0	1	1	13	1
