= Cédric Kipré =

Footballer (born 1996)

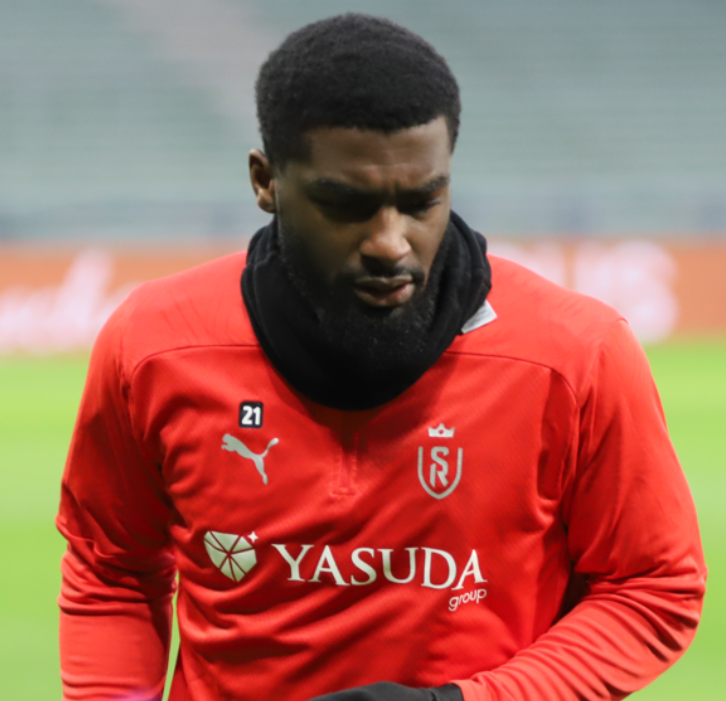
- Kipré with Reims in 2025

Personal information
- Date of birth: 9 December 1996 (age 29)
- Place of birth: Paris, France
- Height: 1.93 m (6 ft 4 in)
- Position: Centre-back

Team information
- Current team: Ipswich Town
- Number: 4

Youth career
- 2008–2014: Paris Saint-Germain

Senior career*
Years	Team	Apps	(Gls)
2014–2017	Leicester City	0	(0)
2015	→ Corby Town (loan)	2	(0)
2017–2018	Motherwell	36	(1)
2018–2020	Wigan Athletic	74	(2)
2020–2024	West Bromwich Albion	59	(3)
2021	→ Charleroi (loan)	5	(0)
2022–2023	→ Cardiff City (loan)	42	(3)
2024–2026	Reims	28	(0)
2025–2026	→ Ipswich Town (loan)	32	(3)
2026–	Ipswich Town	0	(0)

International career^{‡}
2018	Ivory Coast U23	1	(0)
2025–	Ivory Coast	1	(0)
- * Club domestic league appearances and goals as of 22:21, 4 May 2026 (UTC) ‡ National team caps and goals as of 8 June 2025

Cédric Kipré (born 9 December 1996) is a professional footballer who plays as a centre-back for Premier League club Ipswich Town. Born in France, he represents the Ivory Coast national team.

== Club career ==
=== Leicester City ===
After coming through the Youth Academy at Paris Saint-Germain, Kipré joined Leicester City in 2014 and was part of both their Under 18s and Under 21s in his debut season for the club, playing in the then Premier League 2 and FA Youth Cup.

He spent the next few seasons at the King Power Stadium, but only managed games for the Under 21s and the Under 23s. He also formed part of the Under 23s side that played in the EFL Trophy tie against Cheltenham in January 2017.

==== Corby Town (loan) ====
In September 2015, Kipré joined National League North side Corby Town on a one-month loan deal.

He made his debut for The Steelmen against Boston United the next night, turning in an excellent performance prompting boss Tommy Wright to say: "Cedric looked the real deal. He was strong, powerful, very good technically on the ball and he was a breath of fresh air.

He returned from his short loan spell having played three first-team games.

=== Motherwell ===
After his release from Leicester, Kipré joined Motherwell on trial and played in pre-season games against Stirling Albion and Livingston. He impressed manager Stephen Robinson so much that he was awarded an initial one-year deal on 5 July 2017.

He played his first competitive game for the club against Queens Park at Hampden in the League Cup on 15 July, setting up Motherwell's fourth goal in a 5–1 win. On 23 August, he extended his contract by a further year, until the summer of 2019.

Kipré extended his contract again on 13 April 2018 until the summer of 2020. On 28 April, he scored his first Motherwell goal with a glancing header to beat Dundee 2-1. He started in both the 2017 Scottish League Cup Final and the 2018 Scottish Cup final, both of which ended in defeat at the hands of Celtic; he was sent off in the League Cup final.

=== Wigan Athletic ===
Wigan Athletic signed Kipré to a three-year contract on 3 August 2018, having agreed a transfer fee with Motherwell. He made his league debut the following day, playing the full 90 minutes of the 3–2 victory over Sheffield Wednesday. He scored his first goal for Wigan in a 3–1 defeat at Queens Park Rangers on 24 August 2018. On 1 January 2019 Kipré netted from close range to give Wigan Athletic a 3–1 lead against Birmingham City in a match that concluded with a 3–2 win for the "Latics".

=== West Bromwich Albion ===
On 4 September 2020, West Bromwich Albion announced the signing of Kipré on a four-year contract. He made his debut for West Brom on 16 September 2020 in a 3–0 home win against Harrogate Town in the second round of EFL Cup, providing an assist for Hal Robson-Kanu. On 22 January 2022, he scored his first goal for the club in a 3–0 home win against Peterborough United.

Kipre re-established himself as first-choice centre back after returning from loan in the summer of 2023, and won the club's both players' and supporters'player of the season awards on 4 May 2024.

==== Loan to Charleroi ====
On 1 February 2021, Kipré joined Charleroi on a six-month loan.

==== Cardiff City (loan) ====
On 15 July 2022, Kipré joined fellow Championship club Cardiff City on a season-long loan deal.

On 22 May 2024, West Brom announced the player had been offered a new contract.

=== Reims ===
On 24 July 2024, Kipré returned to France and signed for Ligue 1 club Reims.

=== Ipswich Town ===
On 13 July 2025, Kipré returned to England, on loan to recently relegated Ipswich Town. On 5 May 2026, his move was made permanent, with Kipré signing a contract until 2028 after helping the club secure promotion back to the Premier League.

== International career ==
Kipré is eligible to play for the Ivory Coast, with his parents being born there. On 21 March 2018, he was called into the squad for the first time. He made his debut for the under-23s on 27 March 2018, against Togo.

== Personal life ==
Kipré's elder brother, Steve, is also a professional footballer and has played in France, Germany and Scotland, with which he had a short spell with Clyde.

He married fashion influencer and entrepreneur Vanessa Kipré in 2025.

== Career statistics ==
As of match played 25 August 2026

Appearances and goals by club, season and competition
Club	Season	League			National cup (Note: Includes Scottish Cup, FA Cup, Coupe de France)		League cup (Note: Includes Scottish League Cup, EFL Cup)		Other		Total	
Club	Season	Division	Apps	Goals	Apps	Goals	Apps	Goals	Apps	Goals	Apps	Goals
Leicester City	2014–15	Premier League	0	0	0	0	0	0	—		0	0
Leicester City	2015–16	Premier League	0	0	0	0	0	0	—		0	0
Leicester City	2016–17	Premier League	0	0	0	0	0	0	0	0	0	0
Leicester City	Total		0	0	0	0	0	0	0	0	0	0
Corby Town (loan)	2015–16	National League North	2	0	—		—		—		2	0
Motherwell	2017–18	Scottish Premiership	36	1	5	0	8	0	—		49	1
Motherwell	2018–19	Scottish Premiership	0	0	—		3	0	—		3	0
Motherwell	Total		36	1	5	0	11	0	—		52	1
Wigan Athletic	2018–19	Championship	38	0	1	0	1	0	—		40	0
Wigan Athletic	2019–20	Championship	36	2	1	0	0	0	—		37	2
Wigan Athletic	Total		74	2	2	0	1	0	—		77	2
West Bromwich Albion	2020–21	Premier League	0	0	1	0	2	0	—		3	0
West Bromwich Albion	2021–22	Championship	14	1	1	0	1	0	—		16	1
West Bromwich Albion	2023–24	Championship	44	2	2	0	0	0	—		46	2
West Bromwich Albion	Total		58	3	4	0	3	0	—		65	3
Charleroi (loan)	2020–21	Belgian First Division A	5	0	0	0	—		—		5	0
Cardiff City (loan)	2022–23	Championship	42	3	1	0	0	0	—		43	3
Reims	2024–25	Ligue 1	28	0	4	1	—		2 (Note: Appearances in Ligue 1 relegation/promotion play-offs)	1	34	2
Ipswich Town (loan)	2025–26	Championship	32	3	2	0	1	0	—		35	3
Ipswich Town	2026–27	Premier League	0	0	0	0	1	0	—		1	0
Ipswich Town	Ipswich total		32	3	2	0	2	0	—		36	3
Career total			277	12	18	1	17	0	2	1	314	14

== Honours ==
Reims

- Coupe de France runner-up: 2024–25

Ipswich Town

- EFL Championship runner-up: 2025–26
