= 2020–21 Queen of the South F.C. season =

Queen of the South
2020–21 season
- Chairman: Billy Hewitson
- Manager: Allan Johnston
- Stadium: Palmerston Park
- Scottish Championship: 6th
- Scottish Cup: Third round
- League Cup: Group stages
- Top goalscorer: League: Ayo Obileye (9); All: Connor Shields (11)
Home colours	Away colours

The 2020–21 season is Queen of the South's eighth consecutive season in the second tier of Scottish football, the Scottish Championship, having been promoted as champions from the Scottish Second Division at the end of the 2012–13 season. Queens will also be competing in the League Cup and the Scottish Cup.

== Summary ==
Queens finished sixth in the Championship. The league season was curtailed to 27 matches, due to the COVID-19 pandemic, starting on 17 October 2020 and ending on 30 April 2021.

The Doonhamers were knocked out after the first round of the League Cup after the completion of fixtures in Group G that included Greenock Morton, Partick Thistle, Queen's Park and St Mirren.

Queens reached the third round of the Scottish Cup, losing 3-1 at Palmerston to eventual runners-up Hibernian.

The Challenge Cup was not held during the 2020-21 season due to the COVID-19 pandemic.

== Results & fixtures ==
Win Draw Loss Abandoned or Postponed

=== Preseason ===
15 September 2020 Friendly	Queen of the South	6–1	Threave Rovers	Palmerston Park
19:00	Goss; A. Trialist (o.g.); East; Pybus; B. Trialist	QOSFC Report	C. Trialist	Attendance: Closed doors

19 September 2020 Friendly	Queen of the South	2–0	Dalbeattie Star	Palmerston Park
12:00	Shields 29'; East 60'	QOSFC Report		Attendance: Closed doors

22 September 2020 Friendly	Queen of the South	2–1	Annan Athletic	Palmerston Park
19:00	Goss 59'; Shields 63' (pen.)	QOSFC Report	A. Trialist 80'	Attendance: Closed doors

26 September 2020 Friendly	Airdrieonians	1–0	Queen of the South	Excelsior Stadium
13:00	Roy 9'	QOSFC Report; Diamonds Photos		Attendance: Closed doors

28 September 2020 Friendly	Queen of the South	3–0	Threave Rovers	Palmerston Park
19:00	Dobbie 30'; Goss 65'; McKechnie 70'	QOSFC Report		Attendance: Closed doors

1 October 2020 Friendly	Queen of the South	4–1	Stranraer	Palmerston Park
19:00	East 28', 68'; Fitzpatrick 58'; Shields 88'	QOSFC Report	Elliott 4'	Attendance: Closed doors

2 October 2020 Friendly	Queen of the South	6–1	Dalbeattie Star	Palmerston Park
19:00	Dobbie (pen.); Joseph; McGrory	QOSFC Report	Brotherston	Attendance: Closed doors

=== Scottish Championship ===
17 October 2020 Match 1	Ayr United	2–1	Queen of the South	Somerset Park
15:00	Miller 13', 18'; McCowan (yellow card) 61' (yellow-red card) 90+1'	QOSFC Report; BBC Sport Report; Honest Men Photos	Dobbie 56' (pen.); Maxwell (yellow card) 22' (yellow-red card) 66'	Attendance: Closed doors Referee: McLean; Man of the Match: McKee

24 October 2020 Match 2	Queen of the South	2–5	Raith Rovers	Palmerston Park
15:00	Dobbie 5' (pen.); Obileye 60'	QOSFC Report; BBC Sport Report; Rovers Photos	Matthews 2'; Duku 12', 85'; Armstrong 27'; Tait 69'	Attendance: Closed doors Referee: Anderson; Man of the Match: Dobbie

31 October 2020 Match 3	Dunfermline Athletic	3–2	Queen of the South	East End Park
15:00	Murray 21'; McManus 43' (pen.); Watson 60'	QOSFC Report; BBC Sport Report; Pars Photos	McKee 51'; Dobbie 74' (pen.)	Attendance: Closed doors Referee: Irvine; Man of the Match: Fitzpatrick

7 November 2020 Match 4	Arbroath	1–1	Queen of the South	Gayfield Park
15:00	Linn 48'	QOSFC Report; BBC Sport Report; Red Lichties Photos	Maxwell 32'	Attendance: Closed doors Referee: Lowe; Man of the Match: Leighfield

21 November 2020 Match 5	Queen of the South	2–0	Alloa Athletic	Palmerston Park
15:00	Buchanan 39'; McKee 47'	QOSFC Report; BBC Sport Report; Wasps Photos		Attendance: Closed doors Referee: Beaton; Man of the Match: McKee

4 December 2020 Match 6	Queen of the South	0–3	Inverness Caledonian Thistle	Palmerston Park
19:45		QOSFC Report; BBC Sport Report; Caley Jags Photos	Kennedy 21'; MacGregor 50'; Storey 80'	Attendance: Closed doors Referee: McLean; Man of the Match: Shields

12 December 2020 Match 7	Heart of Midlothian	6–1	Queen of the South	Tynecastle Park
15:00	Naismith 20'; Boyce 45+1', 46'; Walker 76'; Frear 82'; Ginnelly 90+1'	QOSFC Report; BBC Sport Report; Jambos Photos	Obileye 72'	Attendance: Closed doors Referee: Collum; Man of the Match: Obileye

19 December 2020 Match 8	Greenock Morton	2–0	Queen of the South	Cappielow Park
15:00	Orsi 41', 76'	QOSFC Report; BBC Sport Report; Ton Photos		Attendance: Closed doors Referee: Steven; Man of the Match: McCabe

26 December 2020 Match 9	Queen of the South	1–3	Dundee	Palmerston Park
15:00	Shields 84'	QOSFC Report; BBC Sport Report; Dee Photos	Sow 13', 21', 54'	Attendance: Closed doors Referee: Newlands; Man of the Match: Shields

29 December 2020 Match 10	Raith Rovers	0–2	Queen of the South	Stark's Park
19:45		QOSFC Report; BBC Sport Report; Rovers Photos	Shields 18'; Goss 90+1'	Attendance: Closed doors Referee: Cook; Man of the Match: Cowie

2 January 2021 Match 11	Queen of the South	3–2	Ayr United	Palmerston Park
15:00	Obileye 29' (pen.); Shields 32', 90+1'	QOSFC Report; BBC Sport Report; Honest Men Photos	Reading 7'; Buchanan 90' (o.g.)	Attendance: Closed doors Referee: Aitken; Man of the Match: Pybus

16 January 2021 Match 12	Queen of the South	2–2	Arbroath	Palmerston Park
15:00	Shields 46', 52'	QOSFC Report; BBC Sport Report; Red Lichties Photos	Stewart 63'; O'Brien 65'	Attendance: Closed doors Referee: Reid; Man of the Match: Shields

23 January 2021 Match 13	Queen of the South	2–1	Greenock Morton	Palmerston Park
15:00	Obileye 15'; Fitzpatrick 27'	QOSFC Report; BBC Sport Report; Ton Photos	Orsi 58'	Attendance: Closed doors Referee: Newlands; Man of the Match: East

30 January 2021	Inverness Caledonian Thistle	P – P	Queen of the South	Caledonian Stadium
15:00		QOSFC News
Note: Postponed due to frozen pitch

6 February 2021 Match 14	Alloa Athletic	2–1	Queen of the South	Indodrill Stadium
15:40	Graham 23'; Cawley 61'	QOSFC Report; BBC Sport Report; Wasps Photos	Jones 8'	Attendance: Closed doors Referee: Reid; Man of the Match: Jones

12 February 2021 Match 15	Queen of the South	1–1	Heart of Midlothian	Palmerston Park
19:45	Obileye 43' (pen.)	QOSFC Report; BBC Sport Report; Jambos Photos	Boyce 90' (pen.)	Attendance: Closed doors Referee: Steven; Man of the Match: Jones

17 February 2021 Match 16	Inverness Caledonian Thistle	0–1	Queen of the South	Caledonian Stadium
18:30		QOSFC Report; BBC Sport Report; Caley Jags Photos	Nortey 63'	Attendance: Closed doors Referee: Lowe; Man of the Match: Ferguson

20 February 2021 Match 17	Dundee	2–3	Queen of the South	Dens Park
15:00	Cummings 51'; Marshall 82'	QOSFC Report; BBC Sport Report; Dee Photos	Obileye 2' (pen.); Breen 37'; Gibson 78'	Attendance: Closed doors Referee: Cook; Man of the Match: Gibson

27 February 2021 Match 18	Queen of the South	1–0	Dunfermline Athletic	Palmerston Park
15:00	Gibson 50'	QOSFC Report; BBC Sport Report; Pars Photos	Mayo (yellow card) 28' (yellow-red card) 90'	Attendance: Closed doors Referee: Roncone; Man of the Match: Gibson

6 March 2021 Match 19	Arbroath	2–4	Queen of the South	Gayfield Park
15:00	Linn 11'; McKenna 22' (pen.)	QOSFC Report; BBC Sport Report; Red Lichties Photos	Obileye 33', 50'; Maxwell 38'; Mebude 45+1'	Attendance: Closed doors Referee: Duncan; Man of the Match: Obileye

13 March 2021 Match 20	Queen of the South	2–3	Alloa Athletic	Palmerston Park
15:00	Mebude 11'; East 37'; Obileye (red card) 45+1'; McCabe (red card) 85'	QOSFC Report; BBC Sport Report; Wasps Photos	Murray 20'; Connelly 44'; Buchanan 77'	Attendance: Closed doors Referee: Aitken; Man of the Match: East

20 March 2021 Match 21	Greenock Morton	2–1	Queen of the South	Cappielow Park
15:00	Nesbitt 19'; Oliver 61'	QOSFC Report; BBC Sport Report; Ton Photos	Obileye 45'	Attendance: Closed doors Referee: Munro; Man of the Match: Obileye

27 March 2021 Match 22	Heart of Midlothian	2–3	Queen of the South	Tynecastle Park
15:00	Popescu 34'; Gnanduillet 72'	QOSFC Report; BBC Sport Report; Jambos Photos	Shields 2', 22'; Irving 82' (o.g.)	Attendance: Closed doors Referee: Duncan; Man of the Match: Shields

10 April 2021 Match 23	Queen of the South	1–1	Inverness Caledonian Thistle	Palmerston Park
15:00	Fitzpatrick 65'	QOSFC Report; BBC Sport Report; Caley Jags Photos	Todorov 68'	Attendance: Closed doors Referee: Irvine; Man of the Match: Dickson

13 April 2021 Match 24	Queen of the South	0–1	Raith Rovers	Palmerston Park
19:00		QOSFC Report; BBC Sport Report; Rovers Photos	Ugwu 17'	Attendance: Closed doors Referee: Dickinson; Man of the Match: McCabe

17 April 2021 Match 25	Dunfermline Athletic	3–1	Queen of the South	East End Park
12:00	O'Hara 10'; Murray 82'; Henderson 90+1'	QOSFC Report; BBC Sport Report; Pars Photos	Maxwell 87'	Attendance: Closed doors Referee: Lowe; Man of the Match: Maxwell

24 April 2021 Match 26	Ayr United	0–0	Queen of the South	Somerset Park
15:00		QOSFC Report; BBC Sport Report; Honest Men Photos		Attendance: Closed doors Referee: Walsh; Man of the Match: Pybus

30 April 2021 Match 27	Queen of the South	0–2	Dundee	Palmerston Park
19:45		QOSFC Report; BBC Sport Report; Dee Photos	Cummings 17', 34'	Attendance: Closed doors Referee: D Robertson; Man of the Match: Dobbie's Photos

=== Scottish League Cup ===
6 October 2020 Round 1;Group G-1	Greenock Morton	2–2 (2–4 p)	Queen of the South	Cappielow Park
19:45	McGinty 18'; Nesbitt 68'	QOSFC Report; SPFL Report; Ton Photos	Dobbie 53'; Shields 79'	Attendance: Closed doors Referee: D Robertson; Man of the Match: Obileye
	Penalties
	Jacobs (penalty scored); Colville (penalty scored); Muirhead (penalty missed); Omar (penalty missed)		McKee (penalty scored); McCabe (penalty scored); Gibson (penalty scored); Shields (penalty missed); Buchanan (penalty scored)

10 October 2020 Round 1;Group G-2	Queen of the South	2–2 (2–4 p)	St Mirren	Palmerston Park
15:00	Shields 8'; Fitzpatrick 12'	QOSFC Report; SPFL Report; Buddies Photos	McGrath 51'; Fraser 89'	Attendance: Closed doors Referee: Collum; Man of the Match: Shields
	Penalties
	McKee (penalty missed); Gibson (penalty missed); Buchanan (penalty scored); Obileye (penalty scored)		McGrath (penalty scored); MacPherson (penalty scored); Morias (penalty scored); Connolly (penalty scored)

13 October 2020 Round 1; Group G-3	Queen of the South	0–0 (2–3 p)	Partick Thistle	Palmerston Park
19:45		QOSFC Report; SPFL Report; Harry Wraggs Photos	Graham (red card) 36'	Attendance: Closed doors Referee: Stuart; Man of the Match: Ferguson
	Penalties
	Obileye (penalty scored); McCabe (penalty scored); Buchanan (penalty missed); Gibson (penalty missed); Nortey (penalty missed)		Rudden (penalty scored); Docherty (penalty missed); Spittal (penalty missed); Kouider-Aissa (penalty scored); McKenna (penalty scored)

10 November 2020 Round 1; Group G-4	Queen's Park	1–3	Queen of the South	Hampden Park
19:45	Quitongo 2'	QOSFC Report; BBC Sport Report; Spiders Photos	East 22'; Joseph 32'; Maxwell 80'	Attendance: Closed doors Referee: Newlands; Man of the Match: McKee

=== Scottish Cup ===
8 January 2021 Round 2	Queen's Park	0–3	Queen of the South	Hampden Park
19:45		QOSFC Report; BBC Sport Report; Spiders Photos	Gibson 45+1'; Fitzpatrick 66'; Shields 82'	Attendance: Closed doors Referee: Anderson; Man of the Match: Shields

5 April 2021 Round 3	Queen of the South	1–3	Hibernian	Palmerston Park
19:45	Maxwell 80'	QOSFC Report; BBC Sport Report; Hibees Photos	Doidge 42', 67'; Boyle 70'	Attendance: Closed doors Referee: Collum; Man of the Match: Maxwell

== Player statistics ==
=== Captains ===
No.	P	Name	Country	No. games	Notes
11	FW	Stephen Dobbie	(Scotland)	16	Club Captain
4	DF	Gregor Buchanan	(Scotland)	15	Vice Captain
12	MF	Rhys McCabe	(Scotland)	2	Vice Captain

Last updated: 30 April 2021
Source: Competitive match reports.
Competitive matches only
Matches started as captain only
Country: FIFA nationality; No.: Squad number; P: Position; Name: Player name; No. Games: Number of games started as captain.

=== Squad ===
As of 30 April 2021

No.	Pos	Nat	Player	Total		Scottish Championship		League Cup		Scottish Cup	
No.	Pos	Nat	Player	Apps	Goals	Apps	Goals	Apps	Goals	Apps	Goals
1	GK	(Scotland) SCO	Jack Leighfield	6	0	5+0	0	1+0	0	0+0	0
2	DF	(England) ENG	Nortei Nortey	12	1	7+3	1	2+0	0	0+0	0
3	DF	(Scotland) SCO	James Maxwell	32	5	26+0	3	4+0	1	2+0	1
4	DF	(Scotland) SCO	Gregor Buchanan	31	1	25+0	1	4+0	0	2+0	0
5	DF	(England) ENG	Ayo Obileye	33	9	27+0	9	4+0	0	2+0	0
6	MF	(Scotland) SCO	Joe McKee	15	2	10+0	2	3+0	0	1+1	0
7	MF	(Scotland) SCO	Aidan Fitzpatrick	27	4	16+6	2	3+1	1	1+0	1
8	MF	(England) ENG	Dan Pybus	20	0	13+3	0	3+0	0	1+0	0
9	FW	(Scotland) SCO	Tommy Goss	15	1	2+10	1	0+2	0	0+1	0
10	FW	(Scotland) SCO	Connor Shields	28	11	21+1	8	4+0	2	2+0	1
11	FW	(Scotland) SCO	Stephen Dobbie	20	4	12+5	3	2+0	1	1+0	0
12	MF	(Scotland) SCO	Rhys McCabe	26	0	20+2	0	2+0	0	2+0	0
13	GK	(England) ENG	Daniel Armstrong	0	0	0+0	0	0+0	0	0+0	0
14	MF	(Northern Ireland) NIR	Harry Robinson	5	0	1+2	0	1+1	0	0+0	0
15	MF	(Scotland) SCO	Calvin McGrory	13	0	6+4	0	1+1	0	0+1	0
16	FW	(Scotland) SCO	Euan East	27	2	18+5	1	3+0	1	1+0	0
17	FW	(Scotland) SCO	Niyah Joseph	16	1	5+7	0	2+1	1	1+0	0
18	MF	(Scotland) SCO	Kieran McKechnie	1	0	0+1	0	0+0	0	0+0	0
19	DF	(Scotland) SCO	Rhys Breen	16	1	15+0	1	0+0	0	1+0	0
20	GK	(Scotland) SCO	Rohan Ferguson	26	0	21+0	0	3+0	0	2+0	0
21	MF	(Scotland) SCO	Dom McMahon	1	0	0+1	0	0+0	0	0+0	0
22	DF	(Guinea) GUI	Disté Sylla	0	0	0+0	0	0+0	0	0+0	0
23	DF	(Scotland) SCO	Cameron Crooks	0	0	0+0	0	0+0	0	0+0	0
24	DF	(Scotland) SCO	Liam Douglas	0	0	0+0	0	0+0	0	0+0	0
25	MF	(England) ENG	Isaiah Jones	12	1	9+2	1	0+0	0	0+1	0
26	MF	(Scotland) SCO	Ciaran Dickson	6	0	5+0	0	0+0	0	1+0	0
29	FW	(Scotland) SCO	Dapo Mebude	12	2	6+5	2	0+0	0	0+1	0
30	GK	(Scotland) SCO	Charlie Cowie	1	0	1+0	0	0+0	0	0+0	0
31	GK	(Scotland) SCO	Josh Rae	0	0	0+0	0	0+0	0	0+0	0
32	GK	(Scotland) SCO	Gary Maley	0	0	0+0	0	0+0	0	0+0	0
33	DF	(Scotland) SCO	Willie Gibson	32	3	26+1	2	2+1	0	2+0	1

=== Disciplinary record ===
As of 30 April 2021 (UTC)

Number	Nation	Position	Name	Scottish Championship		League Cup		Scottish Cup		Total	
Number	Nation	Position	Name	Yellow card	Red card	Yellow card	Red card	Yellow card	Red card	Yellow card	Red card
3	(Scotland)	DF	James Maxwell	4	1	0	0	0	0	4	1
4	(Scotland)	DF	Gregor Buchanan	3	0	1	0	0	0	4	0
5	(England)	DF	Ayo Obileye	3	0	0	0	0	0	3	0
6	(Scotland)	MF	Joe McKee	3	0	0	0	0	0	3	0
7	(Scotland)	MF	Aidan Fitzpatrick	4	0	0	0	0	0	4	0
8	(England)	MF	Dan Pybus	3	0	0	0	1	0	4	0
10	(Scotland)	FW	Connor Shields	5	0	0	0	0	0	5	0
11	(Scotland)	FW	Stephen Dobbie	1	0	0	0	0	0	1	0
12	(Scotland)	MF	Rhys McCabe	3	0	1	0	0	0	4	0
15	(Scotland)	MF	Calvin McGrory	1	0	0	0	0	0	1	0
17	(Scotland)	FW	Niyah Joseph	1	0	0	0	0	0	1	0
19	(Scotland)	DF	Rhys Breen	1	0	0	0	0	0	1	0
20	(Scotland)	GK	Rohan Ferguson	1	0	0	0	0	0	1	0
29	(Scotland)	FW	Dapo Mebude	2	0	0	0	0	0	2	0
33	(Scotland)	DF	Willie Gibson	8	0	0	0	0	0	8	0
Totals				43	1	2	0	1	0	46	1

=== Top scorers ===
Last updated 30 April 2021

Position	Nation	Name	Scottish Championship	League Cup	Scottish Cup	Total
1	(Scotland)	Connor Shields	8	2	1	11
2	(England)	Ayo Obileye	9	0	0	9
3	(Scotland)	James Maxwell	3	1	1	5
4	(Scotland)	Stephen Dobbie	3	1	0	4
=	(Scotland)	Aidan Fitzpatrick	2	1	1	4
6	(Scotland)	Willie Gibson	2	0	1	3
7	(Scotland)	Joe McKee	2	0	0	2
=	(Scotland)	Euan East	1	1	0	2
=	(Scotland)	Dapo Mebude	2	0	0	2
10	(Scotland)	Niyah Joseph	0	1	0	1
=	(Scotland)	Gregor Buchanan	1	0	0	1
=	(Scotland)	Tommy Goss	1	0	0	1
=	(England)	Isaiah Jones	1	0	0	1
=	(England)	Nortei Nortey	1	0	0	1
=	(Scotland)	Rhys Breen	1	0	0	1

=== Clean sheets ===
R	Pos	Nat	Name	Scottish Championship	League Cup	Scottish Cup	Total
1	GK	(Scotland)	Jack Leighfield	1	0	0	1
20	GK	(Scotland)	Rohan Ferguson	3	1	1	5
30	GK	(Scotland)	Charlie Cowie	1	0	0	1
			Totals	5	1	1	7

Last updated: 30 April 2021
Source: Match reports in Competitive matches

== Team statistics ==
=== Scottish Championship ===
==== League table ====
Pos	Team	Pld	W	D	L	GF	GA	GD	Pts	Promotion, qualification or relegation
4	Dunfermline Athletic	27	10	9	8	38	34	+4	39	Qualification for the Premiership play-off quarter-final
5	Inverness Caledonian Thistle	27	8	12	7	36	31	+5	36	
6	Queen of the South	27	9	5	13	38	51	−13	32	
7	Arbroath	27	7	9	11	28	34	−6	30	
8	Ayr United	27	6	11	10	31	37	−6	29	

Source: SPFL
Rules for classification: 1) Points; 2) Goal difference; 3) Goals scored; 4) Head-to-to head points; 5) Head-to-head goal difference; 6) Play-off (only for deciding promotion, play-off participation and relegation).

==== Results by round ====
Round	1	2	3	4	5	6	7	8	9	10	11	12	13	14	15	16	17	18	19	20	21	22	23	24	25	26	27
Ground	A	H	A	A	H	H	A	A	H	A	H	H	H	A	H	A	A	H	A	H	A	A	H	H	A	A	H
Result	L	L	L	D	W	L	L	L	L	W	W	D	W	L	D	W	W	W	W	L	L	W	D	L	L	D	L
Position	6	8	9	9	8	8	9	10	10	8	8	8	7	9	8	5	4	5	4	5	6	6	6	6	6	6	6

Updated to match(es) played on 30 April 2021. Source:
A = Away; H = Home; W = Win; D = Draw; L = Loss

=== League Cup table ===
Pos	Team	Pld	W	PW	PL	L	GF	GA	GD	Pts	Qualification	STM	QOS	PAR	GMO	QPK
1	St Mirren	4	2	2	0	0	8	4	+4	10	Qualification for the Second round	—	—	4–1	p1–1	—
2	Queen of the South	4	1	1	2	0	7	5	+2	7		2–2p	—	0–0p	—	—
3	Partick Thistle	4	1	2	0	1	3	4	−1	7		—	—	—	p0–0	2–0
4	Greenock Morton	4	1	0	3	0	4	3	+1	6		—	2–2p	—	—	1–0
5	Queen's Park	4	0	0	0	4	1	7	−6	0		0–1	1–3	—	—	—

Rules for classification: 1) points, 2) goal difference, 3) goals scored, 4) away goals scored, 5) matches won, 6) away matches won, 7) drawing of lots.

=== Management statistics ===
Last updated 3 May 2021

Name	From	To	P	W	D	L	Win% (Note: Win% is the percentage of matches won rounded to two decimal places.)
Allan Johnston	6 October 2020	30 April 2021	33	11	8	14	33.33

== Transfers ==
=== Players in ===
Player	From	Fee
(England) Dan Pybus	(Scotland) Queen of the South	Free
(Scotland) Tommy Goss	(Scotland) Abbey Vale	Free
(Scotland) Connor Shields	(England) Aldershot Town	Free
(Scotland) Rhys McCabe	(Scotland) Brechin City	Free
(Scotland) Gregor Buchanan	(Scotland) Falkirk	Free
(Scotland) Joe McKee	(Scotland) Dumbarton	Free
(Scotland) Aidan Fitzpatrick	(England) Norwich City	Loan
(England) Ayo Obileye	(England) Ebbsfleet United	Free
(Scotland) Willie Gibson	Free Agent	Free
(Scotland) Rohan Ferguson	(Scotland) Motherwell	Free
(Northern Ireland) Harry Robinson	(Scotland) Motherwell	Loan
(Scotland) Kieran McKechnie	(Scotland) Rangers	Free
(Scotland) Niyah Joseph	(Scotland) Hamilton Academical	Free
(Scotland) James Maxwell	(Scotland) Rangers	Loan
(Scotland) Euan East	(Scotland) Albion Rovers	Free
(England) Nortei Nortey	(England) Chorley	Loan
(Scotland) Calvin McGrory	(Scotland) Queen's Park	Free
(Scotland) Rhys Breen	(Scotland) Rangers	Loan
(Scotland) Dapo Mebude	(Scotland) Rangers	Loan
(Scotland) Gary Maley	(Scotland) Livingston	Loan
(Scotland) Josh Rae	(Scotland) Peterhead	Loan
(England) Isaiah Jones	(England) Middlesbrough	Loan
(Scotland) Ciaran Dickson	(Scotland) Rangers	Loan

=== Players out ===
Player	To	Fee
(Scotland) Scott Mercer	(Scotland) Falkirk	Free
(Scotland) Lee Kilday	(Scotland) Queen's Park	Free
(England) Michael Ledger	(Scotland) Greenock Morton	Free
(Scotland) Connor Murray	(Scotland) Partick Thistle	Free
(Scotland) Lewis Kidd	(Scotland) East Kilbride	Free
(Scotland) Gary Oliver	(Scotland) Greenock Morton	Free
(Scotland) Darren Lyon	Free Agent	Free
(Ghana) Abdul Osman	Free Agent	Free
(England) Callum Semple	Free Agent	Free
(Lithuania) Deimantas Petravicius	Free Agent	Free
(Scotland) Michael Paton	Free Agent	Free
(Scotland) Kevin Holt	(Cyprus) Ermis Aradippou	Undisclosed
(Scotland) Harry Robinson	(Scotland) Motherwell	Loan
(Scotland) James Maxwell	(Scotland) Rangers	Loan
(Scotland) Aidan Fitzpatrick	(England) Norwich City	Loan
(Scotland) Rhys Breen	(Scotland) Rangers	Loan
(England) Isaiah Jones	(England) Middlesbrough	Loan
(Scotland) Ciaran Dickson	(Scotland) Rangers	Loan
(Scotland) Dapo Mebude	(Scotland) Rangers	Loan
(Scotland) Gary Maley	(Scotland) Livingston	Loan
(Scotland) Josh Rae	(Scotland) Peterhead	Loan

== See also ==
- List of Queen of the South F.C. seasons
