= Dapo Mebude =

Footballer (born 2001)

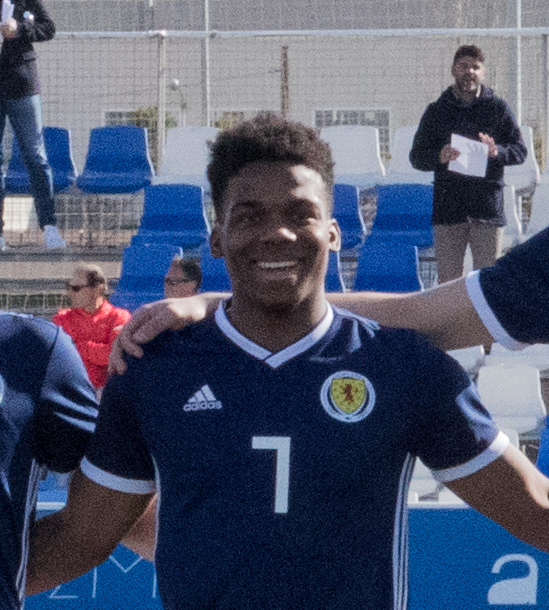
- Mebude with Scotland U19 in 2019

Personal information
- Full name: Adedapo Paul Oluwaseun Awokoya-Mebude
- Date of birth: 29 July 2001 (age 25)
- Place of birth: London, England
- Height: 1.89 m (6 ft 2 in)
- Positions: Winger; striker

Team information
- Current team: Airdrieonians

Youth career
- 2011–2019: Rangers

Senior career*
Years	Team	Apps	(Gls)
2019–2021	Rangers	1	(0)
2021	→ Queen of the South (loan)	11	(2)
2021–2022	Watford	0	(0)
2021–2022	→ AFC Wimbledon (loan)	25	(2)
2022–2024	KV Oostende	7	(0)
2024–2025	Dunfermline Athletic	14	(0)
2025	→ Septemvri Sofia (loan)	0	(0)
2025–2026	Arbroath	18	(1)
2026–	Airdrieonians	8	(0)

International career
- Scotland U16
2017–2018	Scotland U17	10	(2)
2018	Scotland U18	2	(0)
2018–2020	Scotland U19	13	(4)
2021–2022	Scotland U21	5	(0)
- * Club domestic league appearances and goals as of 20:51, 14 October 2026

Adedapo Paul Oluwaseun Awokoya-Mebude (born 29 July 2001) is a Scottish professional footballer who plays as a striker for Scottish League One side Aidrieonians.

== Early life ==
Mebude was born in London, growing up in Peckham, and is of Nigerian descent. His family moved to Scotland when he was 10 years old, living in Govan, and he joined the Rangers youth system after attending an open Soccer Schools event organised by the club. He was later a participant in the SFA's Performance School programme at Holyrood Secondary School, and also attended Rangers' youth partnership school Boclair Academy.

== Club career ==
Mebude turned professional with Rangers in May 2017. Mebude signed a new contract with the club in December 2018, keeping him at Ibrox until 2021. In February 2019 he was recalled from international duty with the Scotland under-19s to join up with the Rangers first team, due to injury problems. Mebude debuted for the first-team on 19 May 2019, in a 2–1 away defeat versus Kilmarnock in the league.

On 21 January 2021, Mebude joined Scottish Championship club Queen of the South on loan until the end of the season. He scored his first professional goal, in a 4–2 league win at Gayfield Park versus Arbroath on 6 March 2021.

In June 2021, Mebude ran out his contract with Rangers to become a free agent. A month later in July, he was signed by Watford on a two-year contract with the option of a further two-years. He suffered a back injury at the end of July 2021, and was hospitalised.

He moved on loan to AFC Wimbledon in August 2021. He scored his first goal for Wimbledon in a 3–3 draw against Bolton Wanderers on 14 August 2021.

In September 2022 he signed for Belgian club KV Oostende.

Mebude trained with Livingston in July 2024. In October 2024, he joined Scottish Championship club Dunfermline Athletic on a one-year deal. Mebude was loaned out to Bulgarian side PFC Septemvri Sofia from February 2025 until the end of the season, and was released by Dunfermline at the end of his contract.

In October 2025 he signed for Arbroath.

On 25 June 2026, Mebude signed for Scottish League One side Airdrieonians.

== International career ==
Mebude has represented Scotland at under-16, under-17, under-18, under-19 youth levels, and made his first under-21 appearance in October 2021 against Denmark.

== Style of play ==
In November 2018, he was described by the Daily Record as a "diminutive striker" who was "highly-rated within Ibrox" and that he was "known for his lightening [sic] quick pace as well as his obvious finishing ability and is a handful for defenders with his trickery". In a September 2019 interview, Mebude stated "When I play as a winger I try and be direct and score goals like Raheem Sterling who is fast, direct and a similar build to me."

== Personal life ==
In February 2021 Mebude was one of five Rangers players fined by Scottish police "for attending an illegal gathering of ten people in a flat" in breach of lockdown rules during the COVID-19 pandemic in the United Kingdom.

Mebude was hospitalised in January 2024 following a car crash. He was unconscious for 5 days. He has a daughter.

His younger brother Dire is also a footballer.

== Career statistics ==
As of match played 15 November 2025

Appearances and goals by club, season and competition
Club	Season	League			National cup (Note: Includes Scottish Cup, FA Cup and Bulgarian Cup)		League cup (Note: Includes Scottish League Cup and EFL Cup)		Other		Total	
Club	Season	Division	Apps	Goals	Apps	Goals	Apps	Goals	Apps	Goals	Apps	Goals
Rangers U20	2019–20	—			—		—		5 (Note: Appearance(s) in Scottish Challenge Cup)	2	5	2
Rangers	2020–21	Scottish Premiership	0	0	0	0	0	0	0	0	0	0
Queen of the South (loan)	2020–21	Scottish Championship	11	2	1	0	—		—		12	2
Watford	2021–22	Premier League	0	0	0	0	0	0	—		0	0
AFC Wimbledon (loan)	2021–22	League One	25	2	2	0	3	0	2 (Note: Appearance(s) in EFL Trophy)	0	32	2
KV Oostende	2022–23	Belgian Pro League	5	0	1	0	—		—		6	0
KV Oostende	2023–24	Challenger Pro League	2	0	0	0	—		—		2	0
KV Oostende	Total		7	0	1	0	—		—		8	0
Dunfermline Athletic	2024–25	Scottish Championship	14	0	2	1	0	0	2	0	18	1
Septemvri Sofia (loan)	2024–25	Bulgarian First League	0	0	—		—		—		0	0
Arbroath	2025–26	Scottish Championship	4	0	0	0	0	0	0	0	4	0
Career total			57	4	6	1	3	0	9	2	75	7
