= Connor Shields =

Scottish footballer (born 1997)

Personal information
- Full name: Connor Jon Shields
- Date of birth: 29 July 1997 (age 29)
- Place of birth: Coatbridge, Scotland
- Height: 1.79 m (5 ft 10 in)
- Position: Striker

Team information
- Current team: Preah Khan Reach Svay Rieng
- Number: 97

Senior career*
Years	Team	Apps	(Gls)
2015–2018	Albion Rovers	39	(9)
2018–2019	Sunderland	0	(0)
2018–2019	→ Alloa Athletic (loan)	30	(3)
2019–2020	Aldershot Town	22	(0)
2020	→ Billericay Town (loan)	2	(1)
2020–2021	Queen of the South	22	(8)
2021–2023	Motherwell	44	(2)
2023	→ Queen's Park (loan)	14	(5)
2023–2025	Chennaiyin	42	(4)
2026–	Preah Khan Reach Svay Rieng	17	(3)
- * Club domestic league appearances and goals as of 13:48, 9 November 2026 (UTC)

Connor Shields (born 29 July 1997) is a Scottish professional footballer who plays as a striker for Cambodian Premier League side Preah Khan Reach Svay Rieng.

He has previously played for Albion Rovers, Sunderland, Aldershot Town and Queen of the South and Motherwell. Shields has also had loan spells with Alloa Athletic, Billercay Town and Queen's Park.

== Career ==
Shields started his career at Albion Rovers during the 2015–16 season.

In January 2018, Shields earned a move to England, signing for Sunderland. In August 2018, Shields was loaned to Alloa Athletic for six months. Shields was released by Sunderland at the end of the 2018–19 season and received interest and offers from a number of clubs.

In June 2019, Shields signed for Aldershot Town on a one-year deal. In March 2020 he moved on loan to Billericay Town, scoring on his debut.

In August 2020, Shields signed for Queen of the South on a one-year deal.

=== Motherwell ===
On 27 May 2021, Shields signed a three-year deal with Scottish Premiership club Motherwell. He scored his first goal for the club on 20 November 2021, in a 2–0 home win against Heart of Midlothian.

On 31 January 2023, Shields joined Scottish Championship club Queen's Park on loan until the end of the season.

On 26 July 2023, Motherwell announced that Shields had left the club to join Indian Super League club Chennaiyin FC.

== Career statistics ==
As of 23 April 2025

Appearances and goals by club, season and competition
Club	Season	League			National Cup		League Cup		Other		Total	
Club	Season	Division	Apps	Goals	Apps	Goals	Apps	Goals	Apps	Goals	Apps	Goals
Albion Rovers	2015–16	Scottish League One	0	0	0	0	0	0	0	0	0	0
Albion Rovers	2016–17	Scottish League One	18	0	0	0	1	0	0	0	19	0
Albion Rovers	2017–18	Scottish League One	21	9	2	0	4	3	0	0	27	12
Albion Rovers	Total		39	9	2	0	5	3	0	0	46	12
Sunderland	2017–18	Championship	0	0	0	0	0	0	—		0	0
Sunderland	2018–19	League One	0	0	0	0	0	0	0	0	0	0
Sunderland	Total		0	0	0	0	0	0	0	0	0	0
Alloa Athletic (loan)	2018–19	Scottish Championship	30	3	2	0	0	0	2 (Note: Appearances in the Scottish Challenge Cup.)	0	34	3
Aldershot Town	2019–20	National League	22	0	1	0	—		0	0	23	0
Billericay Town (loan)	2019–20	National League South	2	1	0	0	—		0	0	2	1
Queen of the South	2020–21	Scottish Championship	22	8	2	1	4	2	—		28	11
Motherwell	2021–22	Scottish Premiership	25	2	3	1	1	0	—		29	3
Motherwell	2022–23	Scottish Premiership	19	0	1	0	2	0	2 (Note: Appearances in the UEFA Europa Conference League)	0	24	0
Motherwell	Total		44	2	4	1	3	0	2	0	53	3
Queen's Park (loan)	2022–23	Scottish Championship	14	5	0	0	0	0	2	0	16	5
Chennaiyin	2023–24	Indian Super League	21	3	3	1	—		3 (Note: Appearance(s) in Durand Cup)	1	27	5
Chennaiyin	2024–25	Indian Super League	21	1	1	0	—		—		22	1
Chennaiyin	Total		42	4	4	1	0	0	3	1	49	6
Career total			215	32	15	3	12	5	9	1	251	41
