= Gennadios Xenodochof =

Georgian footballer

Gennadi Xenodochof
Personal information
- Full name: Gennadios Xenodochof
- Date of birth: 30 May 1988 (age 38)
- Place of birth: Tbilisi, Georgia SSR, Soviet Union
- Height: 1.93 m (6 ft 4 in)
- Position: Goalkeeper

Youth career
- –2006: OFI

Senior career*
Years	Team	Apps	(Gls)
2006–2012	OFI	0	(0)
2007–2008	→ Ergotelis (loan)	0	(0)
2008–2009	→ Olympiakos Chersonissos (loan)	15	(0)
2012–2013	Thrasyvoulos	8	(0)
2013	Doxa Drama	5	(0)
2013–2015	Zakynthos	45	(0)
2015–2017	AEL	42	(1)
2017–2018	Motherwell	0	(0)
2018	Diagoras	2	(0)
2019	Irodotos	8	(0)
2020–2022	Olympiacos Volos	44	(0)
- * Club domestic league appearances and goals as of 27 April 2022

Gennadios Xenodochof (Greek: Γεννάδιος Ξενοδόχοφ; born 30 May 1988) is a Georgian professional footballer who plays as a goalkeeper.

== Club career ==
He started his career from the youth teams of OFI. He was sent on loan to Cretan clubs Ergotelis and Olympiakos Chersonissos until 31 August 2012, when he signed for Thrasyvoulos Fylis. A year later he moved to Doxa Drama. On 24 August 2013 he joined Zakynthos where he had his most productive season to date, making 44 appearances. On 17 July 2015 he signed with AEL.

On 28 November 2015, he scored his first career goal, equalising in injury time with a header to help his club escape with a 1–1 away draw against Panachaiki for the Football League, preserving the club's undefeated record for the 10th consecutive game.

On 16 December 2017, it was announced that Xenodochof had signed a short-term deal with Motherwell until January 2018.
