= Russell Griffiths =

English footballer

Personal information
- Full name: Russell John Griffiths
- Date of birth: 13 April 1996 (age 30)
- Place of birth: Gravesend, England
- Height: 6 ft 4 in (1.92 m)
- Position: Goalkeeper

Youth career
- 2010–2014: Everton

Senior career*
Years	Team	Apps	(Gls)
2014–2017	Everton	0	(0)
2015	→ Northwich Victoria (loan)	6	(0)
2015	→ Colwyn Bay (loan)	6	(0)
2015	→ FC Halifax Town (loan)	1	(0)
2016–2017	→ Cheltenham Town (loan)	24	(0)
2017	→ Motherwell (loan)	4	(0)
2017–2018	Motherwell	6	(0)
2018–2019	AFC Fylde	1	(0)
2019–2020	Chester	31	(0)
2020	→ AFC Telford United (loan)	2	(0)
2020–2022	AFC Telford United	39	(0)

International career
2015	England U20	3	(0)
- * Club domestic league appearances and goals as of 9 June 2022

Russell John Griffiths (born 13 April 1996) is an English footballer who last played as a goalkeeper for AFC Telford United.

== Career ==
=== Everton ===
Griffiths began his career with Everton's academy and, after brief loan spells with non-league Northwich Victoria, Colwyn Bay and FC Halifax Town, before joining League Two side Cheltenham Town on loan for half a season. He made his professional debut on 6 August 2016 in a 1–1 draw with Leyton Orient.

=== Motherwell ===
On 27 January 2017, Griffiths signed for Scottish Premiership club Motherwell on loan for the remainder of the season. He made his debut on 6 May 2017, at home to Ross County.

On 9 June 2017, Everton announced Griffiths would leave the club, and he then signed a one-year contract with Motherwell on 21 June 2017. Griffiths was released by Motherwell at the end of the 2017/18 season.

=== AFC Fylde ===
On 28 June 2018, Griffiths joined National League side AFC Fylde on a one-year deal. He was released by Fylde at the end of the 2018/2019 season.

=== Chester ===
In July 2019, Griffiths signed for National League North club Chester on a one-year deal.

Griffths finished the 2019-20 season on loan at AFC Telford United before signing a permanent deal with the club in June 2020.playing 41 games He left the club at the end of the 2021–22 season.

== Honours ==
AFC Fylde

- FA Trophy: 2018–19
