= List of Scottish football transfers summer 2019 =

This is a list of Scottish football transfers, featuring at least one 2019–20 Scottish Premiership club or one 2019–20 Scottish Championship club, which were completed during the summer 2019 transfer window. The window closed at midnight on Monday 2 September.

== List ==
| Date | Name | Moving from | Moving to | Fee |
|---|---|---|---|---|
| 6 May 2019 | Sean Murdoch | Dunfermline Athletic | Retired | Free |
| 6 May 2019 | Lee Robinson | Dunfermline Athletic | Retired | Free |
| 8 May 2019 | Scott McDonald | Partick Thistle | Western United | Free |
| 9 May 2019 | Souleymane Coulibaly | Partick Thistle | Étoile Sportive du Sahel | Free |
| 9 May 2019 | Niall Keown | Partick Thistle | Retired | Free |
| 14 May 2019 | Ryan Dow | Peterhead | Dunfermline Athletic | Free |
| 14 May 2019 | Christie Elliott | Partick Thistle | Carlisle United | Free |
| 14 May 2019 | Ryan Wallace | Arbroath | East Fife | Undisclosed |
| 16 May 2019 | David Carson | Morpeth Town | Inverness Caledonian Thistle | Free |
| 16 May 2019 | Aaron Comrie | St Johnstone | Dunfermline Athletic | Free |
| 19 May 2019 | Nathan Austin | Inverness Caledonian Thistle | Kelty Hearts | Free |
| 20 May 2019 | Martin Woods | Dundee | FC Halifax Town | Free |
| 20 May 2019 | Genseric Kusunga | Dundee | Cova da Piedade | Free |
| 20 May 2019 | James Craigen | Dunfermline Athletic | AFC Fylde | Free |
| 21 May 2019 | Lennard Sowah | Hamilton Academical | TuS Dassendorf | Free |
| 21 May 2019 | Dougie Imrie | Hamilton Academical | Retired | Free |
| 21 May 2019 | Matthew Kilgallon | Hamilton Academical | Hyderabad FC | Free |
| 21 May 2019 | Jacob Marsden | Hamilton Academical | Needham Market | Free |
| 21 May 2019 | Tom Taiwo | Hamilton Academical | Retired | Free |
| 21 May 2019 | Delphin Tshiembe | Hamilton Academical | HB Torshavn | Free |
| 22 May 2019 | Jordan Kirkpatrick | Alloa Athletic | Forfar Athletic | Free |
| 22 May 2019 | Kane O'Connor | Hibernian | Brentford | Undisclosed |
| 24 May 2019 | Kyle Jacobs | Queen of the South | Greenock Morton | Free |
| 25 May 2019 | Darren O'Dea | Dundee | East Kilbride | Free |
| 27 May 2019 | Tony Watt | St Johnstone | CSKA Sofia | Free |
| 27 May 2019 | Greg Halford | Aberdeen | Southend United | Free |
| 27 May 2019 | Kevin Holt | Pafos | Queen of the South | Free |
| 28 May 2019 | Regan Hendry | Celtic | Raith Rovers | Free |
| 28 May 2019 | Kyle Turner | Stranraer | Dunfermline Athletic | Compensation |
| 29 May 2019 | Brian Easton | St Johnstone | Hamilton Academical | Free |
| 29 May 2019 | Danny Denholm | Arbroath | East Fife | Free |
| 29 May 2019 | Chris Higgins | Ayr United | East Fife | Free |
| 29 May 2019 | Kyle MacDonald | Motherwell | Airdrieonians | Free |
| 29 May 2019 | Stewart Murdoch | Dundee United | East Fife | Free |
| 29 May 2019 | Jermaine Hylton | Solihull Moors | Motherwell | Free |
| 30 May 2019 | Adam Jackson | Barnsley | Hibernian | Free |
| 30 May 2019 | Reece Willison | Celtic | Airdrieonians | Free |
| 30 May 2019 | Matthew Bowman | Repton School | Dunfermline Athletic | Free |
| 30 May 2019 | Gabby McGill | Middlesbrough | Dunfermline Athletic | Free |
| 31 May 2019 | Callum Fordyce | Queen of the South | Airdrieonians | Free |
| 31 May 2019 | Kalvin Orsi | Brechin City | Greenock Morton | Free |
| 31 May 2019 | William Edjenguele | Dundee United | Wealdstone | Free |
| 31 May 2019 | Aaron Hughes | Heart of Midlothian | Retired | Free |
| 31 May 2019 | Jonathan Spector | Hibernian | Retired | Free |
| 31 May 2019 | Carl McHugh | Motherwell | ATK | Free |
| 31 May 2019 | George Newell | Motherwell | Southport | Free |
| 31 May 2019 | Kyle Bradley | Rangers | Annan Athletic | Free |
| 31 May 2019 | Gareth McAuley | Rangers | Retired | Free |
| 31 May 2019 | Anton Ferdinand | St Mirren | Retired | Free |
| 1 June 2019 | Marvin Bartley | Hibernian | Livingston | Free |
| 1 June 2019 | Joe Chalmers | Inverness Caledonian Thistle | Ross County | Free |
| 1 June 2019 | Adam Eckersley | St Mirren | Airdrieonians | Free |
| 1 June 2019 | Markus Fjørtoft | Southern United | Hamilton Academical | Free |
| 1 June 2019 | Declan Gallagher | Livingston | Motherwell | Free |
| 1 June 2019 | Shea Gordon | Motherwell | Partick Thistle | Free |
| 1 June 2019 | Craig Halkett | Livingston | Heart of Midlothian | Free |
| 1 June 2019 | Jake Hastie | Motherwell | Rangers | Compensation |
| 1 June 2019 | Jordan Jones | Kilmarnock | Rangers | Free |
| 1 June 2019 | James Keatings | Hamilton Academical | Inverness Caledonian Thistle | Free |
| 1 June 2019 | Ross Laidlaw | Hibernian | Ross County | Free |
| 1 June 2019 | Liam Polworth | Inverness Caledonian Thistle | Motherwell | Free |
| 1 June 2019 | Mark Reynolds | Aberdeen | Dundee United | Free |
| 1 June 2019 | Michael Rose | Ayr United | Coventry City | Free |
| 1 June 2019 | Casper Sloth | Silkeborg IF | Motherwell | Free |
| 1 June 2019 | Liam Smith | Ayr United | Dundee United | Free |
| 1 June 2019 | Josh Todd | Queen of the South | Dundee | Free |
| 1 June 2019 | Jack Hodge | St Johnstone | Hibernian | Free |
| 1 June 2019 | Josh Doig | Heart of Midlothian | Hibernian | Free |
| 4 June 2019 | Blair Spittal | Partick Thistle | Ross County | Free |
| 4 June 2019 | Ash Taylor | Northampton Town | Aberdeen | Free |
| 5 June 2019 | Curtis Main | Motherwell | Aberdeen | Free |
| 5 June 2019 | Ciaran McKenna | Falkirk | Hamilton Academical | Free |
| 5 June 2019 | Scott Stewart | Airdrieonians | Arbroath | Free |
| 6 June 2019 | Marky Munro | St Johnstone | Stenhousemuir | Loan |
| 6 June 2019 | Blair Alston | St Johnstone | Hamilton Academical | Free |
| 6 June 2019 | Declan McDaid | Ayr United | Dundee | Free |
| 6 June 2019 | Cameron Salkeld | Gateshead | Greenock Morton | Free |
| 6 June 2019 | Sam Ramsbottom | Alfreton Town | Greenock Morton | Free |
| 7 June 2019 | Malaury Martin | Heart of Midlothian | Palermo | Free |
| 7 June 2019 | Liam Buchanan | Raith Rovers | Alloa Athletic | Free |
| 8 June 2019 | Nicky Devlin | Walsall | Livingston | Free |
| 8 June 2019 | Lee Hodson | Rangers | Gillingham | Free |
| 9 June 2019 | Joe Newell | Rotherham United | Hibernian | Free |
| 10 June 2019 | Robbie Muirhead | Dunfermline Athletic | Greenock Morton | Free |
| 10 June 2019 | Ryan McCord | Arbroath | Brechin City | Free |
| 10 June 2019 | Ally Roy | Partick Thistle | Airdrieonians | Free |
| 10 June 2019 | Gregor Buchanan | Greenock Morton | Falkirk | Free |
| 10 June 2019 | Derek Gaston | Greenock Morton | Arbroath | Free |
| 10 June 2019 | Jack Iredale | Greenock Morton | Carlisle United | Free |
| 10 June 2019 | Gary Oliver | Greenock Morton | Queen of the South | Free |
| 10 June 2019 | Scott Allan | Celtic | Hibernian | Free |
| 10 June 2019 | Chris Long | Blackpool | Motherwell | Free |
| 10 June 2019 | Michael Tidser | Greenock Morton | Falkirk | Free |
| 11 June 2019 | Callum Crane | Livingston | Edinburgh City | Free |
| 11 June 2019 | Cécé Pepe | F.C. Rieti | Livingston | Free |
| 12 June 2019 | Aidan Connolly | Dunfermline Athletic | Falkirk | Free |
| 12 June 2019 | Archie Thomas | Dundee United | Cowdenbeath | Free |
| 13 June 2019 | Greg Stewart | Birmingham City | Rangers | Free |
| 13 June 2019 | Kevin Nisbet | Raith Rovers | Dunfermline Athletic | Free |
| 13 June 2019 | Euan Murray | Raith Rovers | Dunfermline Athletic | Undisclosed |
| 13 June 2019 | Jackson Longridge | Dunfermline Athletic | Bradford City | Compensation |
| 13 June 2019 | Sam Roscoe | Aberdeen | Ayr United | Free |
| 14 June 2019 | Lee Wallace | Rangers | Queens Park Rangers | Free |
| 14 June 2019 | Liam Kelly | Livingston | Queens Park Rangers | Undisclosed |
| 14 June 2019 | Adrián Sporle | Banfield | Dundee United | Free |
| 14 June 2019 | Paul Paton | Falkirk | Dunfermline Athletic | Free |
| 14 June 2019 | Lewis Mansell | Blackburn Rovers | Partick Thistle | Free |
| 15 June 2019 | Owain Fôn Williams | Inverness Caledonian Thistle | Hamilton Academical | Free |
| 15 June 2019 | Darren Hill | Arbroath | Cumbernauld United | Free |
| 15 June 2019 | Robbie Crawford | Ayr United | Livingston | Free |
| 17 June 2019 | Jordan McGhee | Falkirk | Dundee | Free |
| 17 June 2019 | Luc Bollan | Dundee United | Aberdeen | Free |
| 18 June 2019 | Charlie Telfer | Greenock Morton | Falkirk | Free |
| 18 June 2019 | Morgaro Gomis | Dundee United | Falkirk | Free |
| 18 June 2019 | Jordan Pettigrew | Livingston | Dumbarton | Free |
| 18 June 2019 | Michael Ruth | Queen's Park | Aberdeen | Compensation |
| 18 June 2019 | Sheyi Ojo | Liverpool | Rangers | Loan |
| 18 June 2019 | Kris Boyd | Kilmarnock | Retired | Free |
| 18 June 2019 | Shaun Byrne | Livingston | Dundee | Free |
| 18 June 2019 | Jordan Marshall | Queen of the South | Dundee | Free |
| 19 June 2019 | David Vaněček | Heart of Midlothian | Puskás Akadémia | Free |
| 19 June 2019 | Aidan Nesbitt | Dundee United | Greenock Morton | Free |
| 19 June 2019 | Nathan Baxter | Chelsea | Ross County | Loan |
| 19 June 2019 | Mikael Lustig | Celtic | Gent | Free |
| 19 June 2019 | Andy Stirling | Queen of the South | Alloa Athletic | Free |
| 19 June 2019 | Robert Thomson | Greenock Morton | Alloa Athletic | Free |
| 19 June 2019 | Nikolay Todorov | Falkirk | Inverness Caledonian Thistle | Free |
| 19 June 2019 | Nicky Cadden | Livingston | Greenock Morton | Free |
| 20 June 2019 | Alex Rodriguez | Motherwell | Oxford United | Free |
| 20 June 2019 | Euan O'Reilly | St Johnstone | Airdrieonians | Loan |
| 20 June 2019 | Scott Boyd | Kilmarnock | Retired | Free |
| 20 June 2019 | Wallace Duffy | Celtic | St Johnstone | Free |
| 20 June 2019 | Elliot Parish | Dundee | St Johnstone | Free |
| 20 June 2019 | Tom Lang | Clyde | Dunfermline Athletic | Free |
| 20 June 2019 | Cammy Bell | Partick Thistle | Falkirk | Free |
| 21 June 2019 | George Edmundson | Oldham Athletic | Rangers | £700,000 |
| 21 June 2019 | Thomas Robson | Falkirk | Partick Thistle | Free |
| 21 June 2019 | Will Collar | Brighton & Hove Albion | Hamilton Academical | Free |
| 21 June 2019 | James Vincent | Dundee | Inverness Caledonian Thistle | Free |
| 21 June 2019 | Michael Doyle | Queen of the South | Falkirk | Free |
| 21 June 2019 | Mark Durnan | Dunfermline Athletic | Falkirk | Free |
| 21 June 2019 | Jesse Curran | Dundee | Muangthong United | Free |
| 21 June 2019 | Josh Coley | Norwich City | Dunfermline Athletic | Loan |
| 22 June 2019 | Kallum Higginbotham | Dunfermline Athletic | Real Kashmir | Free |
| 23 June 2019 | Jon Gallagher | Atlanta United | Aberdeen | Loan |
| 24 June 2019 | Gary Mackay-Steven | Aberdeen | New York City FC | Free |
| 24 June 2019 | Kris Doolan | Partick Thistle | Ayr United | Free |
| 24 June 2019 | Callum Semple | Ross County | Queen of the South | Free |
| 24 June 2019 | Ross Munro | Ross County | Raith Rovers | Loan |
| 25 June 2019 | Gary Woods | Hamilton Academical | Oldham Athletic | Free |
| 25 June 2019 | Sam Jackson | Dundee | Aberdeen | Free |
| 25 June 2019 | Archie Mair | Aberdeen | Norwich City | Compensation |
| 25 June 2019 | Christian Doidge | Forest Green Rovers | Hibernian | £250,000 |
| 25 June 2019 | Lewis Kidd | Falkirk | Queen of the South | Free |
| 25 June 2019 | Greg Leigh | NAC Breda | Aberdeen | Loan |
| 26 June 2019 | Kenny Miller | Dundee | Partick Thistle | Free |
| 26 June 2019 | Tom James | Yeovil Town | Hibernian | Undisclosed |
| 26 June 2019 | Matija Sarkic | Aston Villa | Livingston | Loan |
| 26 June 2019 | Dean Lyness | Raith Rovers | St Mirren | Free |
| 26 June 2019 | Mitchell Curry | Middlesbrough | Inverness Caledonian Thistle | Loan |
| 27 June 2019 | Joe Aribo | Charlton Athletic | Rangers | Compensation |
| 27 June 2019 | Ziggy Gordon | Hamilton Academical | Central Coast Mariners | Free |
| 27 June 2019 | Carlo Pignatiello | Livingston | Stranraer | Loan |
| 28 June 2019 | Christopher Jullien | Toulouse | Celtic | £7 million |
| 28 June 2019 | Jamie Ness | Plymouth Argyle | Dundee | Free |
| 28 June 2019 | Jamie Walker | Wigan Athletic | Heart of Midlothian | Free |
| 28 June 2019 | John Sutton | Retired | Greenock Morton | Free |
| 29 June 2019 | Luca Connell | Bolton Wanderers | Celtic | Free |
| 29 June 2019 | Jordon Forster | Cheltenham Town | Dundee | Free |
| 30 June 2019 | Cristian Gamboa | Celtic | Bochum | Free |
| 30 June 2019 | Dorus de Vries | Celtic | Retired | Free |
| 1 July 2019 | Dedryck Boyata | Celtic | Hertha Berlin | Free |
| 1 July 2019 | Craig Bryson | Derby County | Aberdeen | Free |
| 1 July 2019 | Jake Carroll | Cambridge United | Motherwell | Free |
| 1 July 2019 | Steven Davis | Southampton | Rangers | Free |
| 1 July 2019 | Scott Fox | Ross County | Partick Thistle | Free |
| 1 July 2019 | Ryan Hedges | Barnsley | Aberdeen | Free |
| 1 July 2019 | Johnny Hunt | Stevenage Borough | Hamilton Academical | Free |
| 1 July 2019 | Chris Maxwell | Preston North End | Hibernian | Loan |
| 1 July 2019 | Mark Milligan | Hibernian | Southend United | Free |
| 1 July 2019 | Graeme Shinnie | Aberdeen | Derby County | Free |
| 1 July 2019 | Conor Washington | Sheffield United | Heart of Midlothian | Free |
| 1 July 2019 | Ryan Williamson | Dunfermline Athletic | Partick Thistle | Free |
| 2 July 2019 | Devante Cole | Wigan Athletic | Motherwell | Loan |
| 2 July 2019 | Lewis Allan | Hibernian | Raith Rovers | Free |
| 2 July 2019 | Marvin Compper | Celtic | Duisburg | Free |
| 2 July 2019 | Jack Hamilton | Livingston | Queen of the South | Loan |
| 2 July 2019 | Lee Kilday | Greenock Morton | Queen of the South | Free |
| 3 July 2019 | James Wilson | Manchester United | Aberdeen | Free |
| 3 July 2019 | Lawrence Shankland | Ayr United | Dundee United | Free |
| 3 July 2019 | Boli Bolingoli-Mbombo | Rapid Vienna | Celtic | £3 million |
| 3 July 2019 | Russell Dingwall | Ross County | Elgin City | Free |
| 4 July 2019 | Tony Andreu | Coventry City | St Mirren | Free |
| 4 July 2019 | Mateo Muzek | St Mirren | Sheriff Tiraspol | Free |
| 4 July 2019 | Robby McCrorie | Rangers | Queen of the South | Loan |
| 4 July 2019 | Simon Power | Norwich City | Ross County | Loan |
| 4 July 2019 | Dan Pybus | Tonsberg | Queen of the South | Free |
| 4 July 2019 | Conor Sammon | Heart of Midlothian | Falkirk | Free |
| 5 July 2019 | Adam Barton | Dundee United | Wrexham | Free |
| 5 July 2019 | Aidan Fitzpatrick | Partick Thistle | Norwich City | £350,000 |
| 5 July 2019 | Deniz Mehmet | Queen of the South | Dundee United | Free |
| 5 July 2019 | Ross McCrorie | Rangers | Portsmouth | Loan |
| 6 July 2019 | Kevin Dąbrowski | Hibernian | Cowdenbeath | Loan |
| 6 July 2019 | Aaron Lennox | Partick Thistle | Montrose | Free |
| 6 July 2019 | Dylan Forrest | Celtic | Hamilton Academical | Free |
| 7 July 2019 | Tommy Block | Hibernian | Queen's Park | Loan |
| 8 July 2019 | Jordan Rossiter | Rangers | Fleetwood Town | Loan |
| 8 July 2019 | Laurentiu Branescu | Juventus | Kilmarnock | Loan |
| 8 July 2019 | Arnaud Djoum | Heart of Midlothian | Al-Raed | Free |
| 8 July 2019 | Marcus Godinho | Heart of Midlothian | Zwickau | Free |
| 8 July 2019 | Sherwin Seedorf | Wolverhampton Wanderers | Motherwell | Free |
| 8 July 2019 | Peter Grant | Carlisle United | Greenock Morton | Free |
| 8 July 2019 | Frank Ross | Aberdeen | Ayr United | Loan |
| 9 July 2019 | Mohamed El Makrini | Roda JC Kerkrade | Kilmarnock | Free |
| 9 July 2019 | Nathan Ralph | Dundee | Southend United | Free |
| 9 July 2019 | Denny Johnstone | Greenock Morton | Falkirk | Free |
| 10 July 2019 | Aymen Souda | Dunărea Călărași | Livingston | Free |
| 10 July 2019 | Stephen Kelly | Rangers | Ayr United | Loan |
| 10 July 2019 | Cammy Palmer | Rangers | Partick Thistle | Loan |
| 10 July 2019 | Ben Armour | Greenock Morton | Peterhead | Free |
| 11 July 2019 | Adam King | Swansea City | Dundee United | Free |
| 11 July 2019 | Korede Adedoyin | Everton | Hamilton Academical | Loan |
| 11 July 2019 | Mati Zata | Dundee United | Dumbarton | Free |
| 12 July 2019 | Oan Djorkaeff | Nantes | St Mirren | Free |
| 12 July 2019 | Christian Ilic | Sepsi | Motherwell | Free |
| 12 July 2019 | Kyle Gourlay | Dundee | Hamilton Academical | Free |
| 12 July 2019 | Andrew McCarthy | Partick Thistle | Queen of the South | Free |
| 12 July 2019 | Matthew Knox | Livingston | Brechin City | Free |
| 13 July 2019 | Filip Helander | Bologna | Rangers | £3.5 million |
| 13 July 2019 | Ross Doohan | Celtic | Ayr United | Loan |
| 13 July 2019 | Alex Jones | Bradford City | Partick Thistle | Free |
| 14 July 2019 | Funso Ojo | Scunthorpe United | Aberdeen | £125,000 |
| 15 July 2019 | Brian McLean | Dumbarton | Greenock Morton | Free |
| 15 July 2019 | Michael Paton | Dumbarton | Queen of the South | Free |
| 16 July 2019 | Ibrahima Savane | Beziers | Livingston | Free |
| 16 July 2019 | Josh Edwards | Airdrieonians | Dunfermline Athletic | Undisclosed |
| 16 July 2019 | Callum Smith | Dunfermline Athletic | Airdrieonians | Loan |
| 16 July 2019 | Declan McManus | Ross County | Falkirk | Loan |
| 16 July 2019 | Kevin O'Hara | Falkirk | Alloa Athletic | Free |
| 16 July 2019 | Daniel Higgins | Kilmarnock | Cove Rangers | Free |
| 17 July 2019 | Ryan Hardie | Rangers | Blackpool | Undisclosed |
| 17 July 2019 | Josh Vela | Bolton Wanderers | Hibernian | Free |
| 17 July 2019 | Kerr Waddell | Dundee | Montrose | Free |
| 18 July 2019 | Raffaele De Vita | Livingston | Partick Thistle | Loan |
| 18 July 2019 | Dolly Menga | Livingston | Atlético Petróleos de Luanda | Loan |
| 19 July 2019 | Josh Heaton | St Mirren | Darlington | Free |
| 22 July 2019 | Daniel Candeias | Rangers | Genclerbirligi | Undisclosed |
| 23 July 2019 | Jack Ruddy | Wolverhampton Wanderers | Ross County | Free |
| 23 July 2019 | Lee Erwin | Tractor Sazi | Ross County | Free |
| 23 July 2019 | Chris Cadden | Motherwell | Columbus Crew | Free |
| 23 July 2019 | Jak Alnwick | Rangers | Blackpool | Loan |
| 23 July 2019 | Ryan Edwards | Heart of Midlothian | Burton Albion | Free |
| 23 July 2019 | Declan Glass | Dundee United | Cove Rangers | Loan |
| 24 July 2019 | Chris Antoniazzi | Aberdeen | Cove Rangers | Loan |
| 24 July 2019 | Mitch Austin | Sydney FC | Partick Thistle | Free |
| 24 July 2019 | Jamie Lindsay | Ross County | Rotherham United | £300,000 |
| 24 July 2019 | Hatem Abd Elhamed | Hapoel Be'er Sheva | Celtic | £1.6 million |
| 25 July 2019 | Christy Manzinga | Royal Chatelet | Motherwell | Free |
| 25 July 2019 | Ross Sinclair | St Johnstone | Brechin City | Loan |
| 26 July 2019 | Danny Johnson | Motherwell | Dundee | Free |
| 26 July 2019 | Madis Vihmann | Flora Tallinn | St Johnstone | Loan |
| 26 July 2019 | Henk van Schaik | Livingston | Greenock Morton | Undisclosed |
| 26 July 2019 | Cameron Blues | Livingston | Greenock Morton | Loan |
| 29 July 2019 | Rachid Bouhenna | Dundee United | Sepsi | Unidsclosed |
| 30 July 2019 | David Moyo | St Albans City | Hamilton Academical | Free |
| 30 July 2019 | İlkay Durmuş | Wacker Innsbruck | St Mirren | Free |
| 1 August 2019 | Steven Naismith | Norwich City | Heart of Midlothian | Free |
| 1 August 2019 | Sam Foley | Northampton Town | St Mirren | Free |
| 1 August 2019 | Luke Southwood | Reading | Hamilton Academical | Loan |
| 1 August 2019 | Joe Shaughnessy | St Johnstone | Southend United | Free |
| 2 August 2019 | Sean McLoughlin | Hull City | St Mirren | Loan |
| 2 August 2019 | Jonathan Obika | Oxford United | St Mirren | Free |
| 2 August 2019 | Alex Petkov | Heart of Midlothian | Clyde | Loan |
| 2 August 2019 | Max Johnstone | Sunderland | St Johnstone | Free |
| 2 August 2019 | John Robertson | St Johnstone | Cove Rangers | Loan |
| 2 August 2019 | Blair Malcolm | Cowdenbeath | Alloa Athletic | Free |
| 3 August 2019 | Miles Storey | Partick Thistle | Inverness Caledonian Thistle | Free |
| 4 August 2019 | Greg Tansey | St Mirren | Retired | Free |
| 6 August 2019 | Liam Millar | Liverpool | Kilmarnock | Loan |
| 6 August 2019 | Liam Burt | Rangers | Celtic | Free |
| 6 August 2019 | Louis Longridge | Dunfermline Athletic | Falkirk | Free |
| 7 August 2019 | Sam Stubbs | Middlesbrough | Hamilton Academical | Loan |
| 7 August 2019 | Zak Vyner | Bristol City | Aberdeen | Loan |
| 8 August 2019 | Kane Hemmings | Notts County | Dundee | Free |
| 8 August 2019 | Kieran Tierney | Celtic | Arsenal | £25 million |
| 8 August 2019 | Lewis Moore | Heart of Midlothian | Falkirk | Loan |
| 9 August 2019 | Emilio Izaguirre | Celtic | Motagua | Free |
| 9 August 2019 | Calum Waters | Kilmarnock | St Mirren | Loan |
| 9 August 2019 | Kyle McAllister | Derby County | St Mirren | Free |
| 9 August 2019 | Loic Damour | Cardiff City | Heart of Midlothian | Free |
| 9 August 2019 | Robbie Deas | Celtic | Alloa Athletic | Loan |
| 9 August 2019 | Daniel Church | Celtic | East Fife | Loan |
| 9 August 2019 | Brandon Barker | Manchester City | Rangers | Undisclosed |
| 9 August 2019 | Faissal El Bakhtaoui | Dundee | Queen of the South | Free |
| 9 August 2019 | Aidan McAdams | Rangers | Edinburgh City | Loan |
| 9 August 2019 | Daniel Hoban | Inverness Caledonian Thistle | Elgin City | Loan |
| 9 August 2019 | Daniel MacKay | Inverness Caledonian Thistle | Elgin City | Loan |
| 10 August 2019 | Liam Brown | Motherwell | Edinburgh City | Free |
| 12 August 2019 | Jon Guthrie | Walsall | Livingston | Free |
| 13 August 2019 | Joel Castro Pereira | Manchester United | Heart of Midlothian | Loan |
| 13 August 2019 | Glenn Middleton | Rangers | Hibernian | Loan |
| 14 August 2019 | Glenn Whelan | Aston Villa | Heart of Midlothian | Free |
| 14 August 2019 | Danny Rogers | Aberdeen | Greenock Morton | Loan |
| 15 August 2019 | Myles Beerman | Rangers | Hibernians | Free |
| 15 August 2019 | Andy King | Leicester City | Rangers | Loan |
| 15 August 2019 | Matty Smith | Dundee United | Cove Rangers | Loan |
| 16 August 2019 | Connor Smith | Heart of Midlothian | Cowdenbeath | Loan |
| 16 August 2019 | Chris Hamilton | Heart of Midlothian | Cowdenbeath | Loan |
| 16 August 2019 | Darren Lyon | Peterborough United | Queen of the South | Free |
| 17 August 2019 | Fraser Fyvie | Dundee United | Cove Rangers | Free |
| 17 August 2019 | Jonathan Afolabi | Southampton | Celtic | Free |
| 19 August 2019 | Rory McKeown | Greenock Morton | Team Wellington | Free |
| 20 August 2019 | Niko Hamalainen | Queens Park Rangers | Kilmarnock | Loan |
| 20 August 2019 | Josh McPake | Rangers | Dundee | Loan |
| 20 August 2019 | Jack Stobbs | Sheffield Wednesday | Livingston | Loan |
| 22 August 2019 | Junior Morias | Northampton Town | St Mirren | Undisclosed |
| 22 August 2019 | Fraser Forster | Southampton | Celtic | Loan |
| 23 August 2019 | Zak Rudden | Rangers | Plymouth Argyle | Loan |
| 23 August 2019 | Melker Hallberg | Vejle | Hibernian | Free |
| 23 August 2019 | Jamie Gullan | Hibernian | Raith Rovers | Loan |
| 23 August 2019 | Ben Stirling | Hibernian | Arbroath | Loan |
| 23 August 2019 | Josh Campbell | Hibernian | Arbroath | Loan |
| 23 August 2019 | Luca Colville | Bradford City | Greenock Morton | Undisclosed |
| 24 August 2019 | Reghan Tumilty | Greenock Morton | Dumbarton | Loan |
| 27 August 2019 | Kyle Lafferty | Rangers | Sarpsborg 08 | Free |
| 27 August 2019 | Dario Zanatta | Heart of Midlothian | Partick Thistle | Free |
| 28 August 2019 | Moritz Bauer | Stoke City | Celtic | Loan |
| 29 August 2019 | Richard Foster | St Johnstone | Ross County | Free |
| 29 August 2019 | Olly Lee | Heart of Midlothian | Gillingham | Loan |
| 29 August 2019 | Stevie May | Aberdeen | St Johnstone | Free |
| 29 August 2019 | Miko Virtanen | Aberdeen | Arbroath | Loan |
| 29 August 2019 | Dario Del Fabro | Juventus | Kilmarnock | Loan |
| 29 August 2019 | Rory Currie | Heart of Midlothian | Forfar Athletic | Loan |
| 29 August 2019 | Stephen Welsh | Celtic | Greenock Morton | Loan |
| 30 August 2019 | Jordan Houston | Rangers | Ayr United | Loan |
| 30 August 2019 | Harry Cochrane | Heart of Midlothian | Dunfermline Athletic | Loan |
| 30 August 2019 | Anthony McDonald | Heart of Midlothian | Dunfermline Athletic | Loan |
| 30 August 2019 | Ryotaro Meshino | Manchester City | Heart of Midlothian | Loan |
| 30 August 2019 | Mohamed Elyounoussi | Southampton | Celtic | Loan |
| 2 September 2019 | Anthony Ralston | Celtic | St Johnstone | Loan |
| 2 September 2019 | Jason Holt | Rangers | St Johnstone | Loan |
| 2 September 2019 | Jake Hastie | Rangers | Rotherham United | Loan |
| 2 September 2019 | Adrian Beck | Royale Union Saint-Gilloise | Hamilton Academical | Loan |
| 2 September 2019 | Mark O'Hara | Peterborough United | Motherwell | Loan |
| 2 September 2019 | Ewan Henderson | Celtic | Ross County | Loan |
| 2 September 2019 | Jack Aitchison | Celtic | Forest Green Rovers | Loan |
| 2 September 2019 | Greg Taylor | Kilmarnock | Celtic | Undisclosed |
| 2 September 2019 | Sean Mackie | Hibernian | Dundee | Loan |
| 2 September 2019 | Jason Naismith | Peterborough United | Hibernian | Loan |
| 2 September 2019 | Greg Kiltie | Kilmarnock | Dunfermline Athletic | Loan |
| 2 September 2019 | Adam Livingstone | Motherwell | Greenock Morton | Loan |
| 2 September 2019 | Jack Baird | St Mirren | Greenock Morton | Loan |
| 2 September 2019 | Reece Cole | Brentford | Partick Thistle | Loan |
| 2 September 2019 | Osman Kakay | Queens Park Rangers | Partick Thistle | Loan |
| 2 September 2019 | Osman Sow | Dundee United | Kilmarnock | Loan |
| 2 September 2019 | Connor Johnson | Wolverhampton Wanderers | Kilmarnock | Loan |
| 2 September 2019 | Harvey St Clair | Venezia | Kilmarnock | Loan |
| 2 September 2019 | Lee O'Connor | Manchester United | Celtic | Undisclosed |
| 2 September 2019 | Jeremie Frimpong | Manchester City | Celtic | Undisclosed |
| 2 September 2019 | Ryan Kent | Liverpool | Rangers | £7 million |
| 2 September 2019 | Miquel Nelom | Hibernian | Willem II | Free |

== See also ==
- List of Scottish football transfers winter 2018–19
- List of Scottish football transfers winter 2019–20
