= List of Scottish football transfers summer 2020 =

This is a list of Scottish football transfers, featuring at least one 2020–21 Scottish Premiership club or one 2020–21 Scottish Championship club, which were completed during the summer 2020 transfer window. Due to the effects of the coronavirus pandemic on the football calendar, the summer window for transfers in Scotland ran from 14 July to 5 October. Those dates used the full 12-week period permitted by FIFA, and the governing bodies also authorised clubs outside the Premiership to make loan signings during October 2020.

== List ==
Date	Name	Moving from	Moving to	Fee
19 May 2020	Jon Flanagan	Rangers	Charleroi	Free
26 May 2020	Eboue Kouassi	Celtic	Genk	£1,350,000
27 May 2020	Ianis Hagi	Genk	Rangers	£3,150,000
30 May 2020	Jozo Simunovic	Celtic	Gorica	Free
1 June 2020	Jermain Defoe	AFC Bournemouth	Rangers	Free
1 June 2020	Ross Docherty	Ayr United	Partick Thistle	Free
1 June 2020	Shane Sutherland	Elgin City	Inverness Caledonian Thistle	Free
1 June 2020	Shaun Rooney	Inverness Caledonian Thistle	St Johnstone	Free
1 June 2020	Donis Avdijaj	Heart of Midlothian	Emmen	Free
1 June 2020	Marcel Langer	Heart of Midlothian	Germania Halberstadt	Free
1 June 2020	Steven MacLean	Heart of Midlothian	Retired	Free
1 June 2020	Alan Forrest	Ayr United	Livingston	Free
2 June 2020	Daniel Baur	Heart of Midlothian	Spartans	Free
2 June 2020	Ross Wallace	St Mirren	Retired	Free
2 June 2020	Oan Djorkaeff	St Mirren	Kriens	Free
2 June 2020	Matheus Machado	Inverness Caledonian Thistle	Rio Ave	Free
9 June 2020	Calvin Bassey	Leicester City	Rangers	Free
10 June 2020	Ricki Lamie	Livingston	Motherwell	Free
10 June 2020	Don Cowie	Ross County	Retired	Free
12 June 2020	Jordan White	Inverness Caledonian Thistle	Motherwell	Free
15 June 2020	Bob McHugh	Greenock Morton	Queen's Park	Free
15 June 2020	Aaron McGowan	Hamilton Academical	Kilmarnock	Free
15 June 2020	Nathan McGinley	Forest Green Rovers	Motherwell	Free
15 June 2020	George Oakley	Hamilton Academical	Pirin Blagoevgrad	Free
16 June 2020	Callum Smith	Dunfermline Athletic	Hamilton Academical	Free
18 June 2020	Richard Tait	Motherwell	St Mirren	Free
18 June 2020	Jack Brown	Motherwell	Albion Rovers	Free
19 June 2020	Andy Ryan	Dunfermline Athletic	Stirling Albion	Free
22 June 2020	Jak Alnwick	Rangers	St Mirren	Free
22 June 2020	Scott Fox	Partick Thistle	Motherwell	Free
23 June 2020	Jonny Hayes	Celtic	Aberdeen	Free
23 June 2020	Jon McLaughlin	Sunderland	Rangers	Free
24 June 2020	Mark O'Hara	Peterborough United	Motherwell	Nominal
24 June 2020	Stephen Kelly	Rangers	Ross County	Loan
25 June 2020	Connor Randall	Arda Kardzhali	Ross County	Free
25 June 2020	Jamie Walker	Kilmarnock	Stranraer	Free
26 June 2020	Alex Iacovitti	Oldham Athletic	Ross County	Free
29 June 2020	Charlie Trafford	Inverness Caledonian Thistle	Hamilton Academical	Free
29 June 2020	Ross Callachan	St Johnstone	Hamilton Academical	Free
29 June 2020	Craig Gordon	Celtic	Heart of Midlothian	Free
29 June 2020	Steven Whittaker	Hibernian	Dunfermline Athletic	Free
29 June 2020	Paul Watson	Dundee United	Dunfermline Athletic	Free
30 June 2020	Regan Charles-Cook	Gillingham	Ross County	Free
30 June 2020	Mohamed Elyounoussi	Southampton	Celtic	Loan
1 July 2020	Adam Bogdan	Hibernian	Ferencvaros	Free
1 July 2020	James Craigen	AFC Fylde	Arbroath	Free
3 July 2020	Jake Hastie	Rangers	Motherwell	Loan
3 July 2020	Nicky Cadden	Greenock Morton	Forest Green Rovers	Free
3 July 2020	Mark Gillespie	Motherwell	Newcastle United	Free
5 July 2020	Mickel Miller	Hamilton Academical	Rotherham United	Free
7 July 2020	Nathan Sheron	Fleetwood Town	St Mirren	Loan
8 July 2020	Mitch Pinnock	AFC Wimbledon	Kilmarnock	Free
8 July 2020	Paul Paton	Dunfermline Athletic	East Kilbride	Free
8 July 2020	Lewis Kidd	Queen of the South	East Kilbride	Free
8 July 2020	Jack Fitzwater	West Bromwich Albion	Livingston	Free
8 July 2020	Matej Poplatnik	Kerala Blasters	Livingston	Free
9 July 2020	Matt Polster	Rangers	New England Revolution	£297,000
9 July 2020	Robby McCrorie	Rangers	Livingston	Loan
10 July 2020	Alex Gogic	Hamilton Academical	Hibernian	Free
10 July 2020	Drey Wright	St Johnstone	Hibernian	Free
10 July 2020	Kevin Nisbet	Dunfermline Athletic	Hibernian	Undisclosed
10 July 2020	Declan McManus	Ross County	Dunfermline Athletic	Free
10 July 2020	Jack Newman	Sunderland	Dundee United	Free
10 July 2020	Kevin O'Hara	Alloa Athletic	Dunfermline Athletic	Undisclosed
10 July 2020	Dom Thomas	Kilmarnock	Dunfermline Athletic	Undisclosed
10 July 2020	Liam Scullion	Hamilton Academical	Fauldhouse United	Free
11 July 2020	Euan O'Reilly	St Johnstone	Airdrieonians	Free
13 July 2020	Steven Lawless	Livingston	Burton Albion	Free
13 July 2020	Salim Kouider-Aissa	Queen's Park	Livingston	Free
13 July 2020	Scott Glover	St Mirren	Albion Rovers	Free
13 July 2020	Kelby Mason	Heart of Midlothian	Edinburgh City	Free
13 July 2020	Daniel Hoban	Inverness Caledonian Thistle	Forfar Athletic	Free
14 July 2020	Chris Erskine	Livingston	East Kilbride	Free
14 July 2020	Jack Hendry	Celtic	KV Oostende	Loan
14 July 2020	Danny McNamara	Millwall	St Johnstone	Loan
14 July 2020	Isaac Olaofe	Millwall	St Johnstone	Loan
14 July 2020	Steven Anderson	St Johnstone	Forfar Athletic	Free
15 July 2020	Zeno Ibsen Rossi	AFC Bournemouth	Kilmarnock	Loan
16 July 2020	Carl Tremarco	Inverness Caledonian Thistle	Ross County	Free
16 July 2020	Jamie MacDonald	Kilmarnock	Raith Rovers	Free
16 July 2020	Iain Wilson	Kilmarnock	Dunfermline Athletic	Free
16 July 2020	Lee Kilday	Queen of the South	Queen's Park	Free
17 July 2020	Wes Foderingham	Rangers	Sheffield United	Free
17 July 2020	Joao Victoria	Raith Rovers	Stranraer	Free
20 July 2020	Max Stryjek	Eastleigh	Livingston	Free
20 July 2020	Chris Antoniazzi	Aberdeen	Forfar Athletic	Free
20 July 2020	Joe Shaughnessy	Southend United	St Mirren	Free
20 July 2020	Ísak Þorvaldsson	Norwich City	St Mirren	Loan
20 July 2020	Richard Foster	Ross County	Partick Thistle	Free
20 July 2020	Tom Beadling	Dunfermline Athletic	Barrow	Free
21 July 2020	Danny Whitehall	Maidenhead United	Kilmarnock	Free
21 July 2020	Ciaron Brown	Cardiff City	Livingston	Loan
21 July 2020	Dario Zanatta	Partick Thistle	Ayr United	Free
21 July 2020	Patrick Reading	Stevenage	Ayr United	Free
21 July 2020	Joel Macbeath	Ross County	Elgin City	Free
22 July 2020	Brandon Haunstrup	Portsmouth	Kilmarnock	Free
23 July 2020	Lee Ashcroft	Dunfermline Athletic	Dundee	Free
23 July 2020	Nicky Jamieson	Queen's Park	Alloa Athletic	Free
24 July 2020	Leon Balogun	Wigan Athletic	Rangers	Free
24 July 2020	Scott Mercer	Queen of the South	Falkirk	Free
24 July 2020	Steven Old	Morecambe	East Kilbride	Free
25 July 2020	Connor Murray	Queen of the South	Partick Thistle	Free
27 July 2020	Daniel Harvie	Ayr United	MK Dons	Undisclosed
28 July 2020	Luke Bolton	Manchester City	Dundee United	Loan
28 July 2020	Danny Rogers	Aberdeen	Kilmarnock	Free
28 July 2020	Marcus Fraser	Ross County	St Mirren	Free
29 July 2020	David McMillan	St Johnstone	Dundalk	Free
29 July 2020	Tunde Owolabi	FC United of Manchester	Hamilton Academical	Undisclosed
29 July 2020	Callum Lang	Wigan Athletic	Motherwell	Loan
30 July 2020	Vasilis Barkas	AEK Athens	Celtic	£2,950,000
30 July 2020	Jake Eastwood	Sheffield United	Kilmarnock	Loan
31 July 2020	Craig Conway	Salford City	St Johnstone	Free
31 July 2020	Ryan Edmondson	Leeds United	Aberdeen	Loan
31 July 2020	Tommie Hoban	Watford	Aberdeen	Free
31 July 2020	Hakeem Odoffin	Livingston	Hamilton Academical	Undisclosed
31 July 2020	Aaron Tshibola	Aves	Kilmarnock	Free
31 July 2020	Danny Swanson	St Johnstone	East Fife	Free
31 July 2020	Scott Gallacher	Airdrieonians	Arbroath	Free
31 July 2020	Dean Ritchie	Heart of Midlothian	Airdrieonians	Free
1 August 2020	Stephen Hendrie	Kilmarnock	Morecambe	Free
1 August 2020	Ross Doohan	Celtic	Ross County	Loan
1 August 2020	Christy Manzinga	Motherwell	Linfield	Free
3 August 2020	Jordan Rossiter	Rangers	Fleetwood Town	Free
3 August 2020	Owain Fon Williams	Hamilton Academical	Dunfermline Athletic	Free
3 August 2020	Reghan Tumilty	Greenock Morton	Raith Rovers	Free
3 August 2020	Manny Duku	Hayes & Yeading United	Raith Rovers	Free
3 August 2020	Ryan Edwards	Blackpool	Dundee United	Free
3 August 2020	Lewis Spence	Ross County	Scunthorpe United	Free
4 August 2020	Bobby Burns	Heart of Midlothian	Barrow	Free
4 August 2020	Cedric Itten	St Gallen	Rangers	£2,700,000
4 August 2020	Justin Johnson	Othellos Athienou	Hamilton Academical	Free
4 August 2020	Kemar Roofe	Anderlecht	Rangers	Undisclosed
4 August 2020	Danny Mullen	St Mirren	Dundee	Free
4 August 2020	Gary MacKenzie	St Mirren	Peterhead	Free
5 August 2020	Gary Oliver	Queen of the South	Greenock Morton	Free
5 August 2020	Rabin Omar	Elgin City	Greenock Morton	Free
5 August 2020	Alex Jakubiak	Watford	Dundee	Free
5 August 2020	Sam Wardrop	Dundee United	Dumbarton	Free
6 August 2020	Florian Kamberi	Hibernian	St Gallen	£150,000
6 August 2020	Sean Clare	Heart of Midlothian	Oxford United	Undisclosed
6 August 2020	Clevid Dikamona	Heart of Midlothian	Kilmarnock	Free
6 August 2020	Tom Walsh	Inverness Caledonian Thistle	Ayr United	Free
6 August 2020	Michael Miller	Raith Rovers	Ayr United	Free
6 August 2020	Robbie Deas	Celtic	Inverness Caledonian Thistle	Free
10 August 2020	Lee Hodson	Gillingham	Hamilton Academical	Loan
10 August 2020	Jordan Roberts	Ipswich Town	Heart of Midlothian	Free
10 August 2020	Callumn Morrison	Heart of Midlothian	Falkirk	Free
11 August 2020	Jason Holt	Rangers	Livingston	Free
11 August 2020	Adam Jackson	Hibernian	Lincoln City	Undisclosed
11 August 2020	Frankie Musonda	Luton Town	Raith Rovers	Free
11 August 2020	Colin Doyle	Heart of Midlothian	Kilmarnock	Loan
11 August 2020	Grant Gillespie	Ayr United	Queen's Park	Free
11 August 2020	Stuart Morrison	Dunfermline Athletic	Queen's Park	Free
12 August 2020	Vakoun Issouf Bayo	Celtic	Toulouse	Loan
12 August 2020	Kane Hemmings	Dundee	Burton Albion	Free
13 August 2020	Conor Washington	Heart of Midlothian	Charlton Athletic	Undisclosed
13 August 2020	Albian Ajeti	West Ham United	Celtic	£4,500,000
13 August 2020	Ross Stewart	Livingston	Heart of Midlothian	Loan
13 August 2020	Scott Allardice	Waterford	Inverness Caledonian Thistle	Free
13 August 2020	Stephen O'Donnell	Kilmarnock	Motherwell	Free
14 August 2020	Rory Currie	Heart of Midlothian	Brechin City	Free
14 August 2020	Kris Doolan	Greenock Morton	Arbroath	Free
15 August 2020	Marian Shved	Celtic	Mechelen	Loan
17 August 2020	Uche Ikpeazu	Heart of Midlothian	Wycombe Wanderers	Undisclosed
17 August 2020	Lee O'Connor	Celtic	Tranmere Rovers	Loan
17 August 2020	Ross McCrorie	Rangers	Aberdeen	Loan
17 August 2020	Mark Hill	Celtic	Forfar Athletic	Free
17 August 2020	Danny Devine	Dunfermline Athletic	Inverness Caledonian Thistle	Free
18 August 2020	Blair Alston	Hamilton Academical	Falkirk	Free
19 August 2020	Lyndon Dykes	Livingston	Queens Park Rangers	£2,000,000
19 August 2020	Kristian Dennis	Notts County	St Mirren	Free
20 August 2020	Greg Docherty	Rangers	Hull City	£400,000
20 August 2020	Frank Ross	Aberdeen	Go Ahead Eagles	Free
20 August 2020	Peter Hartley	Motherwell	Jamshedpur	Free
20 August 2020	Gozie Ugwu	Ebbsfleet United	Raith Rovers	Free
21 August 2020	Christian Ilić	Motherwell	Lokomotiv Plovdiv	Free
21 August 2020	Dolly Menga	Livingston	MCS Liège	Free
21 August 2020	Cécé Pepe	Livingston	Free agent	Free
21 August 2020	Julien Serrano	AS Monaco	Livingston	Loan
21 August 2020	Lars Lokotsch	SV Rödinghausen	Livingston	Free
21 August 2020	Ciaran McKenna	Hamilton Academical	Partick Thistle	Free
22 August 2020	Vaclav Hladky	St Mirren	Salford City	Free
22 August 2020	Marley Watkins	Bristol City	Aberdeen	Loan
22 August 2020	Anthony Stokes	Persepolis	Livingston	Free
22 August 2020	Luc Bollan	Aberdeen	Brechin City	Free
24 August 2020	Gregor Buchanan	Falkirk	Queen of the South	Free
24 August 2020	Rhys McCabe	Brechin City	Queen of the South	Free
24 August 2020	Joe McKee	Dumbarton	Queen of the South	Free
24 August 2020	Connor Shields	Aldershot Town	Queen of the South	Free
24 August 2020	Aidan Fitzpatrick	Norwich City	Queen of the South	Loan
24 August 2020	Ray Grant	Clyde	Alloa Athletic	Free
25 August 2020	Dylan Connolly	AFC Wimbledon	St Mirren	Free
27 August 2020	David Turnbull	Motherwell	Celtic	£3,000,000
27 August 2020	Adam Livingstone	Motherwell	Cove Rangers	Free
27 August 2020	Elliott Frear	Forest Green Rovers	Heart of Midlothian	Free
27 August 2020	Rhys Breen	Rangers	Partick Thistle	Loan
27 August 2020	Kieran Wright	Rangers	Partick Thistle	Loan
28 August 2020	Cody Cooke	St Mirren	Weymouth	Free
28 August 2020	Youssouf Mulumbu	Celtic	Kilmarnock	Free
29 August 2020	Jamie Murphy	Rangers	Hibernian	Loan
31 August 2020	Mohamed El Makrini	Kilmarnock	IK Start	Undisclosed
31 August 2020	Vykintas Slivka	Hibernian	Apollon Smyrnis	Free
31 August 2020	Finn Ecrepont	Ayr United	Albion Rovers	Loan
31 August 2020	Gabe Skeoch	Ayr United	Albion Rovers	Loan
2 September 2020	Shane Duffy	Brighton & Hove Albion	Celtic	Loan
2 September 2020	Daryl Horgan	Hibernian	Wycombe Wanderers	Undisclosed
2 September 2020	Josh Ginnelly	Preston North End	Heart of Midlothian	Loan
3 September 2020	Zac Butterworth	Rangers	Edinburgh City	Loan
3 September 2020	Rakish Bingham	Dundee United	Ebbsfleet United	Free
4 September 2020	Jack Baird	St Mirren	Ayr United	Free
4 September 2020	Ross Cunningham	Hamilton Academical	Clyde	Free
4 September 2020	Miko Virtanen	Aberdeen	Arbroath	Loan
5 September 2020	Michael Ruth	Aberdeen	Arbroath	Loan
7 September 2020	Innes Murray	Hibernian	Alloa Athletic	Loan
7 September 2020	Jay Henderson	St Mirren	Clyde	Loan
7 September 2020	Josh Jack	St Mirren	Clyde	Loan
8 September 2020	Dillon Barnes	Queens Park Rangers	Hibernian	Loan
8 September 2020	Kevin Dąbrowski	Hibernian	Dumbarton	Loan
8 September 2020	Alex Petkov	Heart of Midlothian	Levski Sofia	Free
8 September 2020	Scott Cusick	Dunfermline Athletic	Brechin City	Loan
8 September 2020	Jack Hamilton	Livingston	East Fife	Loan
8 September 2020	Scott Robertson	Celtic	Gillingham	Loan
9 September 2020	Ayo Obileye	Ebbsfleet United	Queen of the South	Free
10 September 2020	Lee Erwin	Ross County	St Mirren	Free
10 September 2020	Benjamin Luissint	Queen of the South	Brechin City	Free
10 September 2020	Seb Ross	Aberdeen	Cove Rangers	Free
10 September 2020	Cammy Breadner	St Mirren	Forfar Athletic	Loan
11 September 2020	Kevin Holt	Queen of the South	Ermis Aradippou	Free
11 September 2020	Florent Hoti	Rochdale	Dundee United	Undisclosed
12 September 2020	Zdeněk Zlámal	Heart of Midlothian	St Mirren	Loan
12 September 2020	David Wilson	St Mirren	Clyde	Free
13 September 2020	Boli Bolingoli-Mbombo	Celtic	Istanbul Basaksehir	Loan
14 September 2020	Reece Murdoch	Livingston	Airdrieonians	Free
14 September 2020	Cammy Ballantyne	St Johnstone	Montrose	Loan
15 September 2020	Anthony Stokes	Livingston	Free agent	Free
15 September 2020	Willie Gibson	Stenhousemuir	Queen of the South	Free
15 September 2020	Charlie Adam	Reading	Dundee	Free
15 September 2020	Joe Chalmers	Ross County	Ayr United	Free
16 September 2020	Stephen McGinn	St Mirren	Hibernian	Free
16 September 2020	Jamie Semple	Motherwell	Cove Rangers	Loan
16 September 2020	Salim Kouider-Aissa	Livingston	Partick Thistle	Loan
17 September 2020	Mihai Popescu	Dinamo Bucharest	Heart of Midlothian	Free
17 September 2020	Josh Campbell	Hibernian	Edinburgh City	Loan
17 September 2020	Connor Young	Hibernian	Civil Service Strollers	Loan
17 September 2020	Jack Brydon	Hibernian	Civil Service Strollers	Loan
17 September 2020	Tom James	Hibernian	Wigan Athletic	Loan
17 September 2020	Aidan McAdams	Rangers	Greenock Morton	Free
17 September 2020	Rohan Ferguson	Motherwell	Queen of the South	Free
18 September 2020	Craig Bryson	Aberdeen	St Johnstone	Free
18 September 2020	Robbie Crawford	Livingston	Motherwell	Loan
18 September 2020	Leeroy Makovora	Heart of Midlothian	Brechin City	Loan
18 September 2020	Harry Robinson	Motherwell	Queen of the South	Loan
22 September 2020	Edin Lynch	Kilmarnock	Alloa Athletic	Free
22 September 2020	Dave McKay	Celtic	Brechin City	Free
22 September 2020	Olly Hamilton	St Johnstone	Cowdenbeath	Loan
22 September 2020	Kerr McInroy	Celtic	Dunfermline Athletic	Loan
22 September 2020	Ross Maciver	Motherwell	Greenock Morton	Loan
23 September 2020	Scott McKenna	Aberdeen	Nottingham Forest	£3,000,000
24 September 2020	Aaron Hickey	Heart of Midlothian	Bologna	£1,500,000
24 September 2020	Kyle Fleming	Dundee	Annan Athletic	Loan
25 September 2020	Declan Glass	Dundee United	Partick Thistle	Loan
25 September 2020	Kieran Freeman	Dundee United	Peterhead	Loan
25 September 2020	Niyah Joseph	Hamilton Academical	Queen of the South	Free
25 September 2020	Kieran McKechnie	Rangers	Queen of the South	Free
25 September 2020	James Maxwell	Rangers	Queen of the South	Loan
25 September 2020	Euan East	Albion Rovers	Queen of the South	Free
25 September 2020	Darren Lyon	Queen of the South	Queen's Park	Free
25 September 2020	Josh McPake	Rangers	Greenock Morton	Loan
25 September 2020	James Wallace	Ross County	Greenock Morton	Free
25 September 2020	Michael Ledger	Queen of the South	Greenock Morton	Free
25 September 2020	Markus Fjørtoft	Hamilton Academical	Greenock Morton	Free
25 September 2020	Fraser Murray	Hibernian	Dunfermline Athletic	Loan
25 September 2020	Lewis Mayo	Rangers	Dunfermline Athletic	Loan
25 September 2020	Viljami Sinisalo	Aston Villa	Ayr United	Loan
25 September 2020	Connor Barron	Aberdeen	Brechin City	Loan
25 September 2020	Matthew Todd	Dunfermline Athletic	Brechin City	Loan
25 September 2020	Ryan Mullen	Celtic	Cove Rangers	Loan
25 September 2020	Ross Sinclair	St Johnstone	Cowdenbeath	Loan
25 September 2020	Cian Kavanagh	Heart of Midlothian	Cowdenbeath	Free
26 September 2020	Michael O'Connor	Waterford	Ross County	Undisclosed
28 September 2020	Nicholas Hamilton	York9	Dundee	Loan
28 September 2020	Andy Halliday	Rangers	Heart of Midlothian	Free
28 September 2020	Ben Stirling	Hibernian	Hamilton Academical	Free
29 September 2020	Jonathan Afolabi	Celtic	Dundee	Loan
29 September 2020	Lee Connelly	Sunderland	Alloa Athletic	Loan
29 September 2020	Connor Smith	Heart of Midlothian	Arbroath	Loan
29 September 2020	Chris Hamilton	Heart of Midlothian	Dumbarton	Loan
29 September 2020	Lloyd Robertson	Aberdeen	Clyde	Loan
30 September 2020	Jay Emmanuel-Thomas	PTT Rayong	Livingston	Free
30 September 2020	Kyle Dalling	Aberdeen	Forfar Athletic	Free
2 October 2020	Jermaine Hylton	Motherwell	Ross County	Free
2 October 2020	Devante Cole	Doncaster Rovers	Motherwell	Free
2 October 2020	Gregor Jordan	Dunfermline Athletic	Brechin City	Free
2 October 2020	Paul Brown	Dunfermline Athletic	Stenhousemuir	Free
2 October 2020	Cameron Graham	Dunfermline Athletic	Stenhousemuir	Free
2 October 2020	Tom Lang	Dunfermline Athletic	Clyde	Free
2 October 2020	Ryan Scully	Dunfermline Athletic	Hamilton Academical	Free
2 October 2020	Charlie Reilly	Hamilton Academical	Partick Thistle	Free
2 October 2020	Ethan Ross	Aberdeen	Raith Rovers	Loan
2 October 2020	Jack MacKenzie	Aberdeen	Forfar Athletic	Loan
4 October 2020	Jeando Fuchs	Alavés	Dundee United	Undisclosed
5 October 2020	Jack Aitchison	Celtic	Barnsley	Free
5 October 2020	Bruce Anderson	Aberdeen	Ayr United	Loan
5 October 2020	Wallace Duffy	St Johnstone	Inverness Caledonian Thistle	Free
5 October 2020	Charlie Lakin	Birmingham City	Ross County	Loan
5 October 2020	Greg Leigh	NAC Breda	Aberdeen	Free
5 October 2020	Gary Woods	Oldham Athletic	Aberdeen	Loan
5 October 2020	Kyle Magennis	St Mirren	Hibernian	Undisclosed
5 October 2020	Guy Melamed	Maccabi Netanya	St Johnstone	Free
5 October 2020	Josh Mullin	Ross County	Livingston	Free
5 October 2020	Aymen Souda	Livingston	Sète 34	Free
5 October 2020	Jamie Ness	Dundee	Forfar Athletic	Free
5 October 2020	Michael Paton	Queen of the South	Brechin City	Free
5 October 2020	John Robertson	St Johnstone	Forfar Athletic	Loan
5 October 2020	Calvin McGrory	Queen's Park	Queen of the South	Free
5 October 2020	Nortei Nortey	Chorley	Queen of the South	Loan
5 October 2020	Callum Yeats	Hibernian	Stenhousemuir	Loan
5 October 2020	Jayden Fairley	Hibernian	Stenhousemuir	Loan
5 October 2020	Kyle Connell	Kilmarnock	Airdrieonians	Loan
5 October 2020	Marc McNulty	Reading	Dundee United	Loan
5 October 2020	Diego Laxalt	Milan	Celtic	Loan
5 October 2020	Josh Mulligan	Dundee	Peterhead	Loan
5 October 2020	Bongani Zungu	Amiens	Rangers	Loan
5 October 2020	Daniel Finlayson	Rangers	St Mirren	Loan
5 October 2020	Brandon Mason	Coventry City	St Mirren	Loan

== See also ==
- List of Scottish football transfers winter 2019–20
- List of Scottish football transfers winter 2020–21
