= List of Scottish football transfers winter 2019–20 =

This is a list of Scottish football transfers featuring at least one 2019–20 Scottish Premiership club or one 2019–20 Scottish Championship club which were completed after the summer 2019 transfer window closed and before the end of the 2019–20 season.

== List ==
| Date | Name | Moving from | Moving to | Fee |
|---|---|---|---|---|
| 2 September 2019 | Kyle McClean | St Johnstone | Linfield | Free |
| 3 September 2019 | Kirk Broadfoot | Kilmarnock | St Mirren | Free |
| 4 September 2019 | David McMillan | St Johnstone | Falkirk | Loan |
| 6 September 2019 | Stephen Hendrie | Southend United | Kilmarnock | Free |
| 6 September 2019 | Steven Anderson | St Johnstone | Raith Rovers | Loan |
| 9 September 2019 | Troy Brown | Exeter City | Dundee United | Free |
| 10 September 2019 | Jan Koprivec | Pafos | Kilmarnock | Free |
| 12 September 2019 | Bevis Mugabi | Yeovil Town | Motherwell | Free |
| 13 September 2019 | Jamie MacDonald | Kilmarnock | Alloa Athletic | Loan |
| 13 September 2019 | Thomas Scobbie | Dundee United | Kelty Hearts | Free |
| 16 September 2019 | Callum Booth | Dundee United | St Johnstone | Free |
| 18 September 2019 | Bobby Burns | Heart of Midlothian | Newcastle Jets | Loan |
| 19 September 2019 | Billy King | Dundee United | Greenock Morton | Free |
| 20 September 2019 | Graham Dorrans | Rangers | Dundee | Free |
| 3 October 2019 | Joe Dodoo | Rangers | Bolton Wanderers | Free |
| 4 October 2019 | Abdul Osman | Falkirk | Queen of the South | Free |
| 17 October 2019 | Simeon Jackson | St Mirren | Kilmarnock | Free |
| 18 October 2019 | Elliott Frear | Motherwell | Forest Green Rovers | Free |
| 24 October 2019 | Conor Hazard | Celtic | Dundee | Loan |
| 29 October 2019 | Gael Bigirimana | Hibernian | Solihull Moors | Free |
| 30 October 2019 | Christian Mbulu | Motherwell | Crewe Alexandra | Free |
| 6 November 2019 | Aaron Taylor-Sinclair | Motherwell | Livingston | Free |
| 6 November 2019 | Ibrahima Savane | Livingston | Avranches | Free |
| 21 November 2019 | Adam Bogdan | Liverpool | Hibernian | Free |
| 1 January 2020 | Raffaele De Vita | Livingston | Falkirk | Loan |
| 2 January 2020 | Josh Mulligan | Dundee | Cove Rangers | Loan |
| 3 January 2020 | Cameron Harper | Inverness Caledonian Thistle | Elgin City | Loan |
| 3 January 2020 | Ethan Ross | Aberdeen | Dunfermline Athletic | Loan |
| 3 January 2020 | Troy Brown | Dundee United | Chelmsford City | Free |
| 4 January 2020 | Gregg Wylde | Livingston | Clyde | Free |
| 7 January 2020 | Jamie Adams | Ayr United | Retired | Free |
| 7 January 2020 | Conor McCarthy | Cork City | St Mirren | Undisclosed |
| 7 January 2020 | Jamie McGrath | Dundalk | St Mirren | Free |
| 7 January 2020 | Ryan Schofield | Huddersfield Town | Livingston | Loan |
| 7 January 2020 | Dylan McGeouch | Sunderland | Aberdeen | Free |
| 7 January 2020 | Eros Grezda | Rangers | Osijek | Undisclosed |
| 8 January 2020 | Billy King | Greenock Morton | St Patrick's Athletic | Free |
| 8 January 2020 | Akin Famewo | Norwich City | St Mirren | Loan |
| 8 January 2020 | Ciaron Brown | Cardiff City | Livingston | Loan |
| 8 January 2020 | Scott Sinclair | Celtic | Preston North End | Undisclosed |
| 8 January 2020 | Ben Hall | Partick Thistle | Falkirk | Free |
| 9 January 2020 | George Stanger | Hamilton Academical | Forfar Athletic | Loan |
| 9 January 2020 | Andy Dales | Scunthorpe United | Hamilton Academical | Loan |
| 9 January 2020 | Andy Ryan | Dunfermline Athletic | Airdrieonians | Loan |
| 10 January 2020 | Aidan Keena | Heart of Midlothian | Hartlepool United | Free |
| 10 January 2020 | Dom Thomas | Kilmarnock | Dunfermline Athletic | Loan |
| 10 January 2020 | Dillon Powers | Orlando City | Dundee United | Free |
| 10 January 2020 | Kieran Freeman | Southampton | Dundee United | Free |
| 10 January 2020 | Logan Chalmers | Dundee United | Arbroath | Loan |
| 10 January 2020 | Greig Spence | Arbroath | Stenhousemuir | Free |
| 10 January 2020 | Robert Wilson | Arbroath | Stenhousemuir | Free |
| 10 January 2020 | Lee Connelly | Sunderland | Alloa Athletic | Loan |
| 10 January 2020 | Lewis Toshney | Falkirk | Inverness Caledonian Thistle | Free |
| 11 January 2020 | Andrew McCarthy | Queen of the South | Peterhead | Free |
| 13 January 2020 | Darian MacKinnon | Hamilton Academical | Partick Thistle | Free |
| 13 January 2020 | Mikael Ndjoli | Bournemouth | Motherwell | Loan |
| 14 January 2020 | Patryk Klimala | Jagiellonia Bialystok | Celtic | £3.5 million |
| 14 January 2020 | Faissal El Bakhtaoui | Queen of the South | Difaâ El Jadidi | Undisclosed |
| 15 January 2020 | Harry Bunn | Bury | Kilmarnock | Free |
| 15 January 2020 | Jordan Tillson | Exeter City | Ross County | Free |
| 15 January 2020 | Coll Donaldson | Inverness Caledonian Thistle | Ross County | Undisclosed |
| 15 January 2020 | Zak Rudden | Rangers | Partick Thistle | Undisclosed |
| 15 January 2020 | Tom Lang | Dunfermline Athletic | Clyde | Loan |
| 15 January 2020 | Ross Callachan | St Johnstone | Dundee | Loan |
| 16 January 2020 | Callum Wilson | Partick Thistle | Dumbarton | Free |
| 17 January 2020 | Callum Moore | Dundee | Stenhousemuir | Loan |
| 17 January 2020 | Josh Todd | Dundee | Falkirk | Free |
| 17 January 2020 | Stéphane Oméonga | Genoa | Hibernian | Loan |
| 17 January 2020 | Nicke Kabamba | Hartlepool United | Kilmarnock | Undisclosed |
| 17 January 2020 | Aaron Drinan | Ipswich Town | Ayr United | Loan |
| 18 January 2020 | Dale Hilson | Forfar Athletic | Arbroath | Free |
| 18 January 2020 | Steven Doris | Arbroath | Forfar Athletic | Free |
| 19 January 2020 | Kevin Silva | Heart of Midlothian | Toronto FC | Undisclosed |
| 20 January 2020 | Simeon Jackson | Kilmarnock | Stevenage | Free |
| 20 January 2020 | Josh Vela | Hibernian | Shrewsbury Town | Free |
| 20 January 2020 | Jamie Murphy | Rangers | Burton Albion | Loan |
| 20 January 2020 | Jamie Barjonas | Rangers | Partick Thistle | Loan |
| 20 January 2020 | Donis Avdijaj | Trabzonspor | Heart of Midlothian | Free |
| 21 January 2020 | Robby McCrorie | Rangers | Livingston | Loan |
| 21 January 2020 | Lee O'Connor | Celtic | Partick Thistle | Loan |
| 21 January 2020 | Luke Southwood | Reading | Hamilton Academical | Loan |
| 21 January 2020 | Mark Gallagher | Ross County | Aberdeen | Undisclosed |
| 22 January 2020 | Sam Woods | Crystal Palace | Hamilton Academical | Loan |
| 22 January 2020 | Jack Hendry | Celtic | Melbourne City | Loan |
| 22 January 2020 | Sam Stanton | Dundee United | Phoenix Rising | Free |
| 22 January 2020 | Scott Banks | Dundee United | Crystal Palace | Undisclosed |
| 22 January 2020 | Craig Wighton | Heart of Midlothian | Arbroath | Loan |
| 22 January 2020 | Oli Shaw | Hibernian | Ross County | Undisclosed |
| 23 January 2020 | Kosovar Sadiki | Hibernian | Finn Harps | Loan |
| 23 January 2020 | Eboue Kouassi | Celtic | Genk | Loan |
| 23 January 2020 | Kenny Miller | Partick Thistle | Retired | Free |
| 23 January 2020 | Ollie Crankshaw | Wigan Athletic | Dundee | Loan |
| 23 January 2020 | Brian Graham | Ross County | Partick Thistle | Free |
| 23 January 2020 | Jordan Houston | Rangers | Ayr United | Undisclosed |
| 23 January 2020 | David Devine | Motherwell | Queen of the South | Loan |
| 23 January 2020 | Ross M. Stewart | Livingston | Queen of the South | Loan |
| 23 January 2020 | Rory Currie | Heart of Midlothian | Linfield | Loan |
| 24 January 2020 | Grant Gillespie | Derry City | Ayr United | Free |
| 24 January 2020 | Sam Wardrop | Dundee United | Dumbarton | Loan |
| 24 January 2020 | Toby Sibbick | Barnsley | Heart of Midlothian | Loan |
| 24 January 2020 | Glenn Whelan | Heart of Midlothian | Fleetwood Town | Free |
| 24 January 2020 | Matty Kennedy | St Johnstone | Aberdeen | Undisclosed |
| 24 January 2020 | Ben Stirling | Hibernian | Alloa Athletic | Loan |
| 24 January 2020 | Ryan Shanley | Hibernian | Forfar Athletic | Loan |
| 25 January 2020 | Liam Boyce | Burton Albion | Heart of Midlothian | Undisclosed |
| 27 January 2020 | Ismaila Soro | Bnei Yehuda | Celtic | £2 million |
| 27 January 2020 | Conor Hazard | Celtic | Dundee | Loan |
| 27 January 2020 | Jonathan Afolabi | Celtic | Dunfermline Athletic | Loan |
| 27 January 2020 | Darren Brownlie | Queen of the South | Partick Thistle | Undisclosed |
| 27 January 2020 | Blair Lyons | Montrose | Partick Thistle | Undisclosed |
| 27 January 2020 | Blair Lyons | Partick Thistle | Montrose | Loan |
| 27 January 2020 | Danny Johnson | Dundee | Leyton Orient | Free |
| 28 January 2020 | Peter Urminský | Spartak Trnava | St Mirren | Free |
| 28 January 2020 | Jamie McCart | Inverness Caledonian Thistle | St Johnstone | Undisclosed |
| 29 January 2020 | Sean McGinty | Partick Thistle | Greenock Morton | Free |
| 29 January 2020 | Craig Slater | Partick Thistle | Queen's Park | Free |
| 30 January 2020 | Craig McGuffie | Ayr United | Greenock Morton | Free |
| 30 January 2020 | Lee Hodson | Gillingham | St Mirren | Loan |
| 30 January 2020 | Kieran Wright | Rangers | Alloa Athletic | Loan |
| 30 January 2020 | Scott Tiffoney | Livingston | Ayr United | Loan |
| 30 January 2020 | Callumn Morrison | Heart of Midlothian | East Fife | Loan |
| 30 January 2020 | Steven MacLean | Heart of Midlothian | Raith Rovers | Loan |
| 31 January 2020 | Glenn Middleton | Rangers | Bradford City | Loan |
| 31 January 2020 | Dylan Duncan | Queens Park Rangers | Dunfermline Athletic | Loan |
| 31 January 2020 | Stuart Morrison | Dunfermline Athletic | Queens Park | Loan |
| 31 January 2020 | Owain Fôn Williams | Hamilton Academical | Dunfermline Athletic | Loan |
| 31 January 2020 | Ianis Hagi | Genk | Rangers | Loan |
| 31 January 2020 | Paul McGinn | St Mirren | Hibernian | Undisclosed |
| 31 January 2020 | Greg Docherty | Rangers | Hibernian | Loan |
| 31 January 2020 | Marc McNulty | Reading | Hibernian | Loan |
| 31 January 2020 | Marcel Langer | Schalke 04 | Heart of Midlothian | Free |
| 31 January 2020 | James Wilson | Aberdeen | Salford City | Free |
| 31 January 2020 | Ronald Hernández | Stabæk | Aberdeen | Undisclosed |
| 31 January 2020 | Stephen Gleeson | Aberdeen | Solihull Moors | Free |
| 31 January 2020 | Alex Jakubiak | Watford | St Mirren | Loan |
| 31 January 2020 | Ethan Erhahon | St Mirren | Barnsley | Loan |
| 31 January 2020 | Seifedin Chabbi | Gaziantep | St Mirren | Loan |
| 31 January 2020 | Lewis Morgan | Celtic | Inter Miami | Undisclosed |
| 31 January 2020 | Calum Ferrie | Dundee | Falkirk | Loan |
| 31 January 2020 | Deimantas Petravicius | Okzhetpes | Queen of the South | Free |
| 31 January 2020 | Iain Wilson | Kilmarnock | Queen of the South | Loan |
| 31 January 2020 | Michael Ledger | Notodden | Queen of the South | Free |
| 31 January 2020 | Matt Butcher | Bournemouth | St Johnstone | Loan |
| 31 January 2020 | Isaiah Jones | Middlesbrough | St Johnstone | Loan |
| 31 January 2020 | Innes Murray | Hibernian | Airdrieonians | Loan |
| 31 January 2020 | Scott Banks | Crystal Palace | Alloa Athletic | Loan |
| 31 January 2020 | David Templeton | Burton Albion | Hamilton Academical | Free |
| 31 January 2020 | Connor Malley | Middlesbrough | Ayr United | Loan |
| 31 January 2020 | Christie Elliott | Carlisle United | Dundee | Free |
| 31 January 2020 | Kelby Mason | Heart of Midlothian | Edinburgh City | Loan |
| 31 January 2020 | Lewis Mayo | Rangers | Partick Thistle | Loan |
| 31 January 2020 | Ronan Hughes | Hamilton Academical | Stirling Albion | Loan |
| 31 January 2020 | Christophe Berra | Heart of Midlothian | Dundee | Loan |
| 31 January 2020 | Kirk Broadfoot | St Mirren | Kilmarnock | Undisclosed |
| 31 January 2020 | Alex Bruce | Kilmarnock | Macclesfield | Free |
| 31 January 2020 | Florian Kamberi | Hibernian | Rangers | Loan |
| 31 January 2020 | Rolando Aarons | Newcastle United | Motherwell | Loan |
| 31 January 2020 | James Scott | Motherwell | Hull City | £1.5 million |
| 31 January 2020 | Tom Field | Brentford | Dundee | Free |
| 31 January 2020 | James Craigen | Fylde | Arbroath | Loan |
| 4 February 2020 | Adam Livingstone | Motherwell | Clyde | Loan |
| 6 February 2020 | Rakish Bingham | Doncaster Rovers | Dundee United | Free |
| 6 February 2020 | Kris Doolan | Ayr United | Greenock Morton | Free |
| 7 February 2020 | Tony Watt | CSKA Sofia | Motherwell | Free |
| 7 February 2020 | Gary Harkins | Partick Thistle | Stenhousemuir | Free |
| 11 February 2020 | Ross Wallace | Fleetwood Town | St Mirren | Free |
| 12 February 2020 | Jake Mulraney | Heart of Midlothian | Atlanta United | Undisclosed |
| 18 February 2020 | Efe Ambrose | Derby County | Livingston | Free |
| 18 February 2020 | Alex Petkov | Heart of Midlothian | Brechin City | Loan |
| 20 February 2020 | Luc Bollan | Aberdeen | Peterhead | Loan |
| 9 March 2020 | Harry Robinson | Oldham Athletic | Motherwell | Free |

== See also ==
- List of Scottish football transfers summer 2019
- List of Scottish football transfers summer 2020
