= 2019–20 Livingston F.C. season =

Livingston
2019–20 season
- Chairman: Robert Wilson
- Manager: Gary Holt
- Stadium: Almondvale Stadium
- Scottish Premiership: 5th
- Scottish League Cup: Quarter-finals
- Scottish Cup: Fifth round
- Top goalscorer: League: Lyndon Dykes (9); All: Lyndon Dykes (11)
- Highest home attendance: 8,643 vs Celtic, Premiership, 4 March 2020
- Lowest home attendance: 692 vs Berwick Rangers, League Cup, 27 July 2019
- Average home league attendance: 3,542
Home colours	Away colours

The 2019–20 season was Livingston's second consecutive season in the Scottish Premiership, the top flight of Scottish football. Livingston also competed in the Scottish Cup and the League Cup.

On 13 March, the Scottish football season was suspended with immediate effect due to the COVID-19 Coronavirus outbreak. On 18 May, the SPFL declared the end of the season determining on an average points per game with Livi finishing in fifth place.

== Season summary ==
Gary Holt remained as manager for the season. Livi started the season well by going nine matches unbeaten until they met Rangers in the League, with them also knocking Livi out of the League Cup. Then for the first time in their history Livi earned their maiden win against Celtic in the League. They went on an eight match win-less League run but ended it with a win against Kilmarnock. Lyndon Dykes became the first Livi player to score a top-flight hat-trick against Ross County. Livi were knocked out in the fifth round of the Scottish Cup by Inverness Caledonian Thistle. Their away match at Rangers was postponed and rearranged 24 hours later by the SPFL due to Storm Dennis. They moved up to fifth in the table before all football was suspended due to COVID-19 Coronavirus outbreak. On 9 April, the Scottish football season was further suspended until at least 10 June. Livi shortly after released a statement saying they would support a decision to finish the league early. On 18 May, the SPFL finished the league.

== Results & fixtures ==
Win Draw Loss Postponed

=== Pre-season ===
30 June 2019 Friendly	ŠKF Sereď	1–1	Livingston	Budapest, Hungary
16:00	Kuzma 73' (pen.)	Report	Dykes 41'

3 July 2019 Friendly	Paksi	1–0	Livingston	Budapest, Hungary
16:00	Böde 28'	Report

6 July 2019 Friendly	Tranmere Rovers	1–2	Livingston	St Andrews
15:00	Mullin 50'	Report	Pittman 45'; Menga 74'	Attendance: 0
Note: Match played behind closed doors

9 July 2019 Friendly	Alloa Athletic	0–2	Livingston	Indodrill Stadium
19:45		Report	Dykes 13'; Miller 81'

=== Scottish Premiership ===
3 August 2019 1	Livingston	0–0	Motherwell	Almondvale Stadium
15:00		BBC Report		Attendance: 2,633; Referee: David Munro

10 August 2019 2	St Johnstone	2–2	Livingston	McDiarmid Park
14:00	Kennedy 55'; Hendry 82'	BBC Report	Lawless 13'; Pittman 39'	Attendance: 2,349; Referee: Andrew Dallas

24 August 2019 3	Ross County	1–4	Livingston	Global Energy Stadium
15:00	Stewart 44'	BBC Report	Guthrie 3'; Lawless 14'; Dykes 26'; Stobbs 52'	Attendance: 4,237; Referee: John Beaton

31 August 2019 4	Livingston	2–1	St Mirren	Almondvale Stadium
15:00	Lithgow 26'; Dykes 58'	Report	Magennis 64'	Attendance: 2,346; Referee: Colin Steven

14 September 2019 5	Rangers	3–1	Livingston	Ibrox Stadium
15:00	Tavernier 55'; Morelos 71'; Barker 79'	Report	Lawless 47' (pen.); Dykes (yellow card) 50' (yellow-red card) 73'	Attendance: 48,793; Referee: Willie Collum

21 September 2019 6	Livingston	0–2	Aberdeen	Almondvale Stadium
15:00 BST	Jacobs (yellow card) 52'; Devlin (yellow card) 90+2'	Report	Considine 29'; Cosgrove 90+3' (pen.)	Attendance: 2,803; Referee: Nick Walsh

28 September 2019 7	Hamilton Academical	2–1	Livingston	New Douglas Park
15:00	Alston 45+1'; Cunningham 84' (pen.); Stubbs (yellow card) 90+1'	Report	Lithgow 15'; Robinson (yellow card) 47'	Attendance: 1,075; Referee: Steven McLean

6 October 2019 8	Livingston	2–0	Celtic	Almondvale Stadium
12:00	Robinson 47'; Dykes 73'	Report	Christie (red card) 26'	Attendance: 8,196; Referee: Willie Collum
Note: Game televised on Sky Sports Football

19 October 2019 9	Kilmarnock	2–1	Livingston	Rugby Park
15:00	Dicker 39'; McKenzie 55'	Report	Miller 84'	Attendance: 4,828; Referee: Steven McLean

26 October 2019 10	Livingston	0–0	Heart of Midlothian	Almondvale Stadium
15:00	Souda (red card) 49'	Report		Attendance: 3,854; Referee: Greg Aitken

30 October 2019 11	Hibernian	2–2	Livingston	Easter Road
19:45	Allan 62' (pen.); Boyle 90+2'	Report	Lawless 38'; Sibbald 41'	Attendance: 14,662; Referee: Gavin Duncan

2 November 2019 12	Motherwell	2–1	Livingston	Fir Park
15:00	Long 47'; Gallagher (yellow card) 52'; Campbell 83'	Report	Guthrie (yellow card) 30'; Lawless 60' (pen.) (yellow card) 69'	Attendance: 4,423; Referee: Euan Anderson

10 November 2019 13	Livingston	0–2	Rangers	Almondvale Stadium
15:00	McMillan (yellow card) 20'; Bartley (yellow card) 73'; Taylor-Sinclair (yellow card) 81'	Report	Aribo 32'; Morelos 52'	Attendance: 8,071; Referee: Nick Walsh
Note: Game televised on Sky Sports Football

23 November 2019 14	Celtic	4–0	Livingston	Celtic Park
	Édouard 19'; Brown 57' (yellow card) 90+4'; Forrest 64', 90+1'	Report	Dykes (yellow card) 44'; Tiffoney (yellow card) 80'	Attendance: 58,247; Referee: Andrew Dallas

30 November 2019 15	Livingston	0–0	Hamilton Academical	Almondvale Stadium
15:00		Report	Easton (yellow card) 76'	Attendance: 1,076; Referee: William Collum

4 December 2019 16	Heart of Midlothian	1–1	Livingston	Tynecastle Park
	MacLean 88'	Report	Bartley (yellow card) 8' (goal) 33'; Pittman (yellow card) 49'; Robinson (yellow card) 55'; Guthrie (yellow card) 68'	Attendance: 14,681; Referee: Greg Aitken

7 December 2019 17	Livingston	3–0	Kilmarnock	Almondvale Stadium
15:00	Guthrie 54'; Dykes 65'; Lawless 81'	Report	McKenzie (yellow card) 27'; Power (yellow card) 86'	Attendance: 1,531; Referee: John Beaton

14 December 2019 18	St Mirren	3–3	Livingston	St Mirren Park
	Morias 33'; Obika 61', 73'; Flynn (yellow card) 71'	Report	Souda 13', 56'; Lawson (yellow card) 26'; Guthrie 45'; Robinson (yellow card) 83'; Dykes (yellow card) 88'	Attendance: 4,344; Referee: Nick Walsh

21 December 2019 19	Livingston	4–0	Ross County	Almondvale Stadium
15:00	Lamie 31'; Dykes 41', 50', 73'; Sibbald (yellow card) 60'	Report		Attendance: 1,201; Referee: Colin Steven

26 December 2019 20	Aberdeen	2–1	Livingston	Pittodrie Stadium
15:00	McLennan 13'; Taylor (yellow card) 85'; Anderson 81'	Report	Dykes 86'	Attendance: 14,518; Referee: Bobby Madden

29 December 2019 21	Livingston	2–0	Hibernian	Almondvale Stadium
15:00 GMT	Lawson (yellow card) 33'; Guthrie 62', 77'; Bartley (yellow card) 75'	Report	Slivka (yellow card) 60'	Attendance: 4,902; Referee: Euan Anderson

22 January 2020 22	Livingston	1–0	St. Johnstone	Almondvale Stadium
	McMillan (yellow card) 40'; Bartley (yellow card) 44'; Pittman 56'	Report	Kane (yellow card) 80'	Attendance: 1,140; Referee: Euan Anderson

25 January 2020 23	Hamilton Academical	2–4	Livingston	New Douglas Park
15:00	Want 13'; Woods 57'; Fjørtoft (yellow card) 77'	Report	Sibbald 15'; Taylor-Sinclair 32'; Lawless 62' (pen.); Pittman 65'; Souda (yellow card) 71'	Attendance: 1,487; Referee: Bobby Madden

1 February 2020 24	Livingston	1–0	Motherwell	Almondvale Stadium
15:00	Bartley (yellow card) 56'; Dykes (yellow card) 56'; Taylor-Sinclair 67'	Report	Tait (yellow card) 70'; O'Hara (yellow card) 89'; Carroll (yellow card) 90+1'	Attendance: 1,932; Referee: John Beaton

5 February 2020 25	Ross County	2–0	Livingston	Global Energy Stadium
19:45	McKay 2', 59'	Report		Attendance: 3,301; Referee: Nick Walsh

12 February 2020 26	Livingston	2–1	St Mirren	Almondvale Stadium
19:45	Lawless 34' (pen.); Dykes 46'	Report	Obika 50'	Attendance: 1,263; Referee: David Munro

16 February 2020 27	Rangers	1–0	Livingston	Ibrox Stadium
15:00	Arfield 59'	Report	Lawson (yellow card) 34'; Guthrie (yellow card) 43'; Crawford (yellow card) 68'	Attendance: 48,302; Referee: Euan Anderson
Note: Match was played 24 hours later than planned due to Storm Dennis

22 February 2020 28	Hibernian	1–1	Livingston	Easter Road
15:00	Doidge 50'	Report	Taylor-Sinclair 56'	Attendance: 15,553; Referee: Alan Newlands

4 March 2020 29	Livingston	2–2	Celtic	Almondvale Stadium
	Guthrie 24'; Robinson 46'	Report	McGregor 16'; Rogic 90+1'	Attendance: 8,640; Referee: Willie Collum

7 March 2020 30	St Johnstone	1–0	Livingston	McDiarmid Park
15:00	Hendry 84'	Report		Attendance: 3,008; Referee: Kevin Clancy

=== Scottish League Cup ===
==== Group stage ====
13 July 2019 Group	Falkirk	1–1 (3–4 p)	Livingston	Falkirk Stadium
15:00	Connolly (yellow card) 6'; Dixon (yellow card) 68'; Sammon 90'	BBC Report; Livi Report	Dykes 36'	Attendance: 2,121; Referee: Alan Muir
	Penalties
	Telfer (penalty scored); Tidser (penalty missed); Sammon (penalty scored); Toshney (penalty missed)		(penalty scored) Jacobs; (penalty scored) Miller; (penalty scored) Lamie; (penalty scored) Souda

16 July 2019 Group	Livingston	2–1	Ayr United	Almondvale Stadium
19:45	Souda 25'; Lamie 83'	SPFL Report; Livi Report	Murdoch 51'	Attendance: 1,097; Referee: Willie Collum

23 July 2019 Group	Stranraer	1–2	Livingston	Stair Park
19:45	McManus (yellow card) 48'; Elliott 57'	BBC Report	Lawless 42' (pen.); Souda 45'	Attendance: 402; Referee: Craig Napier

27 July 2019 Group	Livingston	5–0	Berwick Rangers	Almondvale Stadium
15:00	Lamie 2', 81'; Sibbald 16', 84'; Lithgow 24'	BBC Report		Attendance: 692; Referee: Colin Steven

==== Knockout round ====
17 August 2019 Second round	Forfar Athletic	1–2	Livingston	Station Park
15:00	Hilson 63'	BBC Report	Dykes 34'; Pittman 53'	Attendance: 884; Referee: Gavin Duncan

25 September 2019 Quarter-final	Livingston	0–1	Rangers	Almondvale Stadium
19:45		Report	Kamara 5'	Attendance: 8,160; Referee: Don Robertson
Note: Game televised on BT Sport 1 and BT Sport Ultimate

=== Scottish Cup ===
18 January 2020 Fourth round	Livingston	3–1	Raith Rovers	Almondvale Stadium
15:00 GMT	Lawless 77' (pen.), 90+1' (pen.); Dykes 78'	Report	Baird 22'	Attendance: 1,725; Referee: Alan Newlands

8 February 2020 Fifth round	Inverness CT	1–0	Livingston	Caledonian Stadium
15:01 GMT	Welsh 61'	Report		Attendance: 1,512; Referee: Don Robertson

== Squad statistics ==
=== Appearances ===
No.	Pos	Nat	Player	Total		Premiership		League Cup		Scottish Cup	
No.	Pos	Nat	Player	Apps	Goals	Apps	Goals	Apps	Goals	Apps	Goals
1	GK	(Scotland) SCO	Robby McCrorie	7	0	7	0	0	0	0	0
2	DF	(Scotland) SCO	Nicky Devlin	16	0	11	0	5	0	0	0
3	DF	(Northern Ireland) NIR	Ciaron Brown	11	0	9	0	0	0	2	0
4	DF	(Scotland) SCO	Alan Lithgow	17	3	9+3	2	5	1	0	0
5	DF	(Scotland) SCO	Ricki Lamie	30	4	19+3	1	6	3	2	0
6	MF	(England) ENG	Marvin Bartley	36	1	27+1	1	6	0	2	0
7	MF	(South Africa) RSA	Keaghan Jacobs	29	0	14+10	0	3+1	0	1	0
8	MF	(Scotland) SCO	Scott Pittman	30	4	23	3	5	1	2	0
9	FW	(Australia) AUS	Lyndon Dykes	33	11	25	9	6	2	2	0
10	MF	(Scotland) SCO	Craig Sibbald	21	4	14+4	2	1	2	1+1	0
11	MF	(Scotland) SCO	Steven Lawless	37	8	29+1	8	5	0	2	0
14	DF	(England) ENG	Hakeem Odoffin	7	0	3+4	0	0	0	0	0
15	DF	(France) FRA	Cécé Pepe	6	0	0+2	0	3+1	0	0	0
16	MF	(Scotland) SCO	Robbie Crawford	25	0	13+7	0	4+1	0	0	0
17	MF	(Scotland) SCO	Scott Robinson	27	2	13+9	2	1+2	0	0+2	0
19	FW	(Scotland) SCO	Chris Erskine	14	0	3+7	0	0+3	0	0+1	0
20	FW	(Tunisia) TUN	Aymen Souda	25	4	11+6	2	5+1	2	2	0
21	DF	(Scotland) SCO	Jack McMillan	25	0	19+2	0	3	0	0+1	0
24	FW	(Angola) ANG	Dolly Menga	4	0	0+3	0	0	0	0+1	0
25	DF	(Nigeria) NGA	Efe Ambrose	3	0	3	0	0	0	0	0
27	DF	(England) ENG	Jon Guthrie	32	6	28	6	2	0	2	0
29	DF	(Scotland) SCO	Aaron Taylor-Sinclair	14	3	12+2	3	0	0	0	0
31	GK	(England) ENG	Ryan Schofield	3	0	1	0	0	0	2	0
33	DF	(Togo) TOG	Steve Lawson	20	0	11+6	0	0+1	0	2	0
40	GK	(Scotland) SCO	Gary Maley	0	0	0	0	0	0	0	0
Players who left the club during the season
1	GK	(Scotland) SCO	Ross Stewart	9	0	7	0	2	0	0	0
12	MF	(Scotland) SCO	Cameron Blues	0	0	0	0	0	0	0	0
18	FW	(Scotland) SCO	Lee Miller	5	1	0+3	1	0+2	0	0	0
22	MF	(Scotland) SCO	Scott Tiffoney	11	0	1+7	0	0+3	0	0	0
23	MF	(Italy) ITA	Raffaele De Vita	0	0	0	0	0	0	0	0
29	DF	(Guinea) GUI	Ibrahima Savane	2	0	0+1	0	0+1	0	0	0
30	GK	(Montenegro) MNE	Matija Sarkic	18	0	14	0	4	0	0	0
31	MF	(England) ENG	Jack Stobbs	4	1	2+2	1	0	0	0	0
37	MF	(Scotland) SCO	Craig Henderson	0	0	0	0	0	0	0	0

- Robby McCrorie used squad No. 23 for one match against St Johnstone. He used No. 1 after.

== Team statistics ==
=== League table ===
Pos	Team	Pld	W	D	L	GF	GA	GD	Pts	PPG	Qualification or relegation (Note: All play-off matches were cancelled, as clubs voted to curtail the season due to the COVID-19 pandemic.)
3	Motherwell	30	14	4	12	41	38	+3	46	1.53	Qualification for the Europa League first qualifying round
4	Aberdeen	30	12	9	9	40	36	+4	45	1.50	Qualification for the Europa League first qualifying round
5	Livingston	30	10	9	11	41	39	+2	39	1.30	
6	St Johnstone	29	8	12	9	28	46	−18	36	1.24	
7	Hibernian	30	9	10	11	42	49	−7	37	1.23	

Source: BBC SPFL
Rules for classification: 1) Points per game; 2) Goal difference; 3) Goals scored; 4) Head-to-head points; 5) Head-to-Head goal difference; 6) Play-off (only if deciding champion, UEFA competitions qualification, second stage group allocation or relegation).

=== League cup table ===
Pos	Team	Pld	W	PW	PL	L	GF	GA	GD	Pts	Qualification	LIV	AYR	FAL	STR	BER
1	Livingston	4	3	1	0	0	10	3	+7	11	Qualification for the Second Round	—	2–1	—	—	5–0
2	Ayr United	4	2	0	1	1	12	5	+7	7		—	—	2–1	2–2p	—
3	Falkirk	4	2	0	1	1	6	3	+3	7		1–1p	—	—	1–0	—
4	Stranraer	4	1	1	0	2	9	5	+4	5		1–2	—	—	—	6–0
5	Berwick Rangers	4	0	0	0	4	0	21	−21	0		—	0–7	0–3	—	—

Rules for classification: 1) goal difference, 2) goals scored, 3) away goals scored, 4) matches won, 5) away matches won, 6) drawing of lots.

== Transfers ==
=== Transfers in ===
Date	Position	Name	Previous club	Fee	Ref
11 Jun 2019	DF	(France) Cécé Pepe	(Italy) Rieti	Free	
15 Jun 2019	MF	(Scotland) Robbie Crawford	(Scotland) Ayr United	Free	
26 Jun 2019	GK	(Montenegro) Matija Sarkic	(England) Aston Villa	Loan	
1 Jul 2019	DF	(Scotland) Nicky Devlin	(England) Walsall	Free	
16 Jul 2019	DF	(Guinea) Ibrahima Savane	(France) Béziers	Free	
20 Jul 2019	FW	(France) Aymen Souda	(Romania) Dunărea Călărași	Free	
12 Aug 2019	DF	(England) Jon Guthrie	(England) Walsall	Free	
20 Aug 2019	MF	(England) Jack Stobbs	(England) Sheffield Wednesday	Loan	
6 Nov 2019	DF	(Scotland) Aaron Taylor-Sinclair	(Scotland) Motherwell	Free	
8 Jan 2020	GK	(England) Ryan Schofield	(England) Huddersfield Town	Loan	
8 Jan 2020	DF	(Northern Ireland) Ciaron Brown	(Wales) Cardiff City	Loan	
21 Jan 2020	GK	(Scotland) Robby McCrorie	(Scotland) Rangers	Loan	
18 Feb 2020	DF	(Nigeria) Efe Ambrose	(England) Derby County	Free	

=== Transfers out ===
Date	Position	Name	Subsequent Club	Fee	Ref.
14 Jun 2019	GK	(Scotland) Liam Kelly	(England) Queens Park Rangers	Undisclosed	
18 Jun 2019	MF	(Scotland) Shaun Byrne	(Scotland) Dundee	Undisclosed	
19 Jun 2019	MF	(Scotland) Nicky Cadden	(Scotland) Greenock Morton	Free	
27 Jun 2019	MF	(Scotland) Carlo Pignatiello	(Scotland) Stranraer	Loan	
1 Jul 2019	DF	(Scotland) Callum Crane	(Scotland) Edinburgh City	Free	
1 Jul 2019	GK	(Scotland) Jordan Pettigrew	(Scotland) Dumbarton	Free	
1 Jul 2019	FW	(Scotland) Jack Hamilton	(Scotland) Queen of the South	Loan	
1 Jul 2019	DF	(Scotland) Declan Gallagher	(Scotland) Motherwell	Free	
1 Jul 2019	DF	(Scotland) Craig Halkett	(Scotland) Heart of Midlothian	Free	
7 Jul 2019	DF	(Scotland) Cameron Clark	(Scotland) Queen's Park	Free	
12 Jul 2019	FW	(Scotland) Matthew Knox	(Scotland) Brechin City	Free	
18 Jul 2019	FW	(Italy) Raffaele De Vita	(Scotland) Partick Thistle	Loan	
18 Jul 2019	FW	(Angola) Dolly Menga	(Angola) Atlético Petróleos de Luanda	Loan	
26 Jul 2019	DF	(Netherlands) Henk van Schaik	(Scotland) Greenock Morton	Undisclosed	
6 Sep 2019	MF	(Scotland) Cameron Blues	(Scotland) Greenock Morton	Free	
19 Nov 2019	FW	(Scotland) Lee Miller	(Scotland) Falkirk	Free	
1 Jan 2020	FW	(Italy) Raffaele De Vita	(Scotland) Falkirk	Loan	
4 Jan 2020	FW	(Scotland) Gregg Wylde	(Scotland) Clyde	Free	
23 Jan 2020	GK	(Scotland) Ross Stewart	(Scotland) Queen of the South	Loan	
30 Jan 2020	MF	(Scotland) Scott Tiffoney	(Scotland) Ayr United	Loan	
31 Jan 2020	DF	(Guinea) Ibrahima Savane	(France) US Avranches	Free	

== See also ==
List of Livingston F.C. seasons
