= Oliver Sarkic =

Montenegrin footballer

Personal information
- Full name: Oliver Sarkic
- Date of birth: 23 July 1997 (age 29)
- Place of birth: Grimsby, England
- Height: 1.84 m (6 ft 0 in)
- Positions: Forward; attacking midfielder

Team information
- Current team: Čelik Zenica
- Number: 18

Youth career
- 2006–2014: Anderlecht
- 2014–2015: Benfica

Senior career*
Years	Team	Apps	(Gls)
2015–2018	Benfica B	44	(5)
2017	→ Fafe (loan)	18	(2)
2017	→ Leeds United (loan)	0	(0)
2018–2019	Leeds United	0	(0)
2018–2019	→ Barakaldo (loan)	12	(1)
2019–2020	Burton Albion	28	(3)
2020–2022	Blackpool	5	(0)
2021	→ Mansfield Town (loan)	4	(0)
2022	Pakhtakor Tashkent	9	(3)
2023–2024	Dečić	51	(13)
2024–2025	Budućnost	22	(2)
2025–2026	Olympic Charleroi	20	(0)
2026–	Čelik Zenica	8	(1)

International career
2013	Montenegro U17	3	(0)
2014–2016	Montenegro U19	9	(4)
2016–2017	Montenegro U21	10	(2)
- * Club domestic league appearances and goals as of 24 October 2026

Oliver Sarkic (Montenegrin: Оливер Шаркић, romanized: Oliver Šarkić; born 23 July 1997) is a professional footballer who plays as an attacking midfielder for Bosnian Premier League club Čelik Zenica. Born in England, he represented Montenegro at youth level. He came through the academies of Anderlecht and Benfica. He has also played for Fafe, Leeds United, Barakaldo, Burton Albion, Mansfield Town, Blackpool, Pakhtakor Tashkent, Dečić and Budućnost.

== Club career ==
=== Early career ===
On 1 September 2014, Sarkic joined Portuguese champions Benfica from Belgian club Anderlecht, being assigned to their youth team. He debuted professionally for Benfica B in a 3–2 win over Porto B in Segunda Liga, on 11 January 2015. On 14 February 2015, he scored twice in a 4–1 home win against Oliveirense.

In January 2017, Sarkic joined AD Fafe on loan until the end of the season, during his loan stint he made 19 league appearances, scoring twice. In July 2017, he had a trial for then Premier League side Swansea City, featuring in two U23 friendlies against Glentoran and Cliftonville.

=== Leeds United ===
On 8 September 2017, Sarkic joined English side Leeds United on a loan deal until 31 December 2017, being assigned to their under-23 team. He signed a permanent deal with Leeds United on 11 January 2018, with the contract running until 2020 and the club option of a further year.

On 1 September 2018, Sarkic joined Spanish Segunda División B club Barakaldo CF on a season-long loan.

=== Burton Albion ===
On 27 July 2019, Sarkic joined EFL League One side Burton Albion on trial from Leeds, starting in their pre-season friendly against Chesterfield On 1 August, he joined Albion on a permanent deal for an undisclosed figure. He scored his first goal for Burton in an EFL Cup tie against Bournemouth on 25 September 2019.

=== Blackpool ===
Sarkic signed a two-year deal with Blackpool on 9 July 2020. On 1 February 2021, Sarkic joined League Two side Mansfield Town on loan for the remainder of the 2020–21 season.

He was released by the club, in a mutual agreement, on 26 January 2022.

On 3 February 2022, Sarkic joined Uzbekistan Super League side Pakhtakor until the end of the year.

On 30 July 2026, Sarkic joined newly promoted Premier League of Bosnia and Herzegovina side Čelik Zenica.

== Personal life ==
Sarkic was born in England, in Grimsby, Lincolnshire. His father, Bojan Šarkić, is a Montenegrin diplomat who was ambassador to the United Kingdom at the time of birth. His mother, Natalie Šarkić-Todd, is British and works at a European media network. Bojan become ambassador of Belgium later where Oliver and his twin brother, Matija were raised. Both brothers attended the British School of Brussels and played together at Anderlecht. On 15 June 2024, Sarkic's brother Matija died in Budva shortly after returning from the Montenegro national team camp, aged 26.

== Career statistics ==
As of match played 24 October 2026

Appearances and goals by club, season and competition
Club	Season	League			National cup (Note: Includes FA Cup, Montenegrin Cup, Croky Cup)		League cup (Note: Includes EFL Cup)		Continental		Other		Total	
Club	Season	Division	Apps	Goals	Apps	Goals	Apps	Goals	Apps	Goals	Apps	Goals	Apps	Goals
Benfica B	2014–15	LigaPro	19	2	0	0	0	0	–		0	0	19	2
Benfica B	2015–16	LigaPro	25	3	0	0	0	0	–		0	0	25	3
Benfica B	2016–17	LigaPro	0	0	0	0	0	0	–		0	0	0	0
Benfica B	Total		44	5	0	0	0	0	0	0	0	0	44	5
Fafe (loan)	2016–17	LigaPro	18	2	0	0	0	0	–		0	0	18	2
Leeds United (loan)	2017–18	Championship	0	0	0	0	0	0	–		0	0	0	0
Leeds United	2018–19	Championship	0	0	0	0	0	0	–		0	0	0	0
Barakaldo (loan)	2018–19	Segunda División B	12	1	0	0	0	0	–		0	0	12	1
Burton Albion	2019–20	League One	28	3	2	1	4	1	–		3 (Note: Appearances in the Football League Trophy)	0	37	5
Blackpool	2020–21	League One	5	0	1	0	1	0	–		2	0	9	0
Mansfield Town (loan)	2020–21	League Two	4	0	0	0	0	0	–		0	0	4	0
Pakhtakor	2022	Uzbekistan Super League	9	3	0	0	–		4 (Note: Appearances in AFC Champions League)	1	1 (Note: Appearance in the Uzbekistan Super Cup)	0	14	4
Dečić	2022–23	Montenegrin First League	17	2	2	0	–		–		–		19	2
Dečić	2023–24	Montenegrin First League	34	11	4	0	–		–		–		38	11
Dečić	Total		51	13	6	0	–		–		–		57	13
Budućnost Podgorica	2024–25	Montenegrin First League	22	2	2	1	–		1 (Note: Appearance in UEFA Conference League)	0	–		25	3
Olympic Charleroi	2025–26	Challenger Pro League	20	0	2	1	–		–		–		22	1
Čelik Zenica	2026–27	Bosnian Premier League	8	1	0	0	–		–		–		8	1
Career total			221	30	13	3	5	1	5	1	6	0	250	35
