= Bojan Šarkić =

Montenegrin diplomat

Bojan Šarkić is a Montenegrin diplomat who is Ambassador to the European Union, and has previously served as Ambassador to the United Kingdom and Ambassador to Belgium. He is the father of footballers Matija Sarkic and Oliver Sarkic.
