= Matija Sarkic =

English-born Montenegrin footballer (1997–2024)

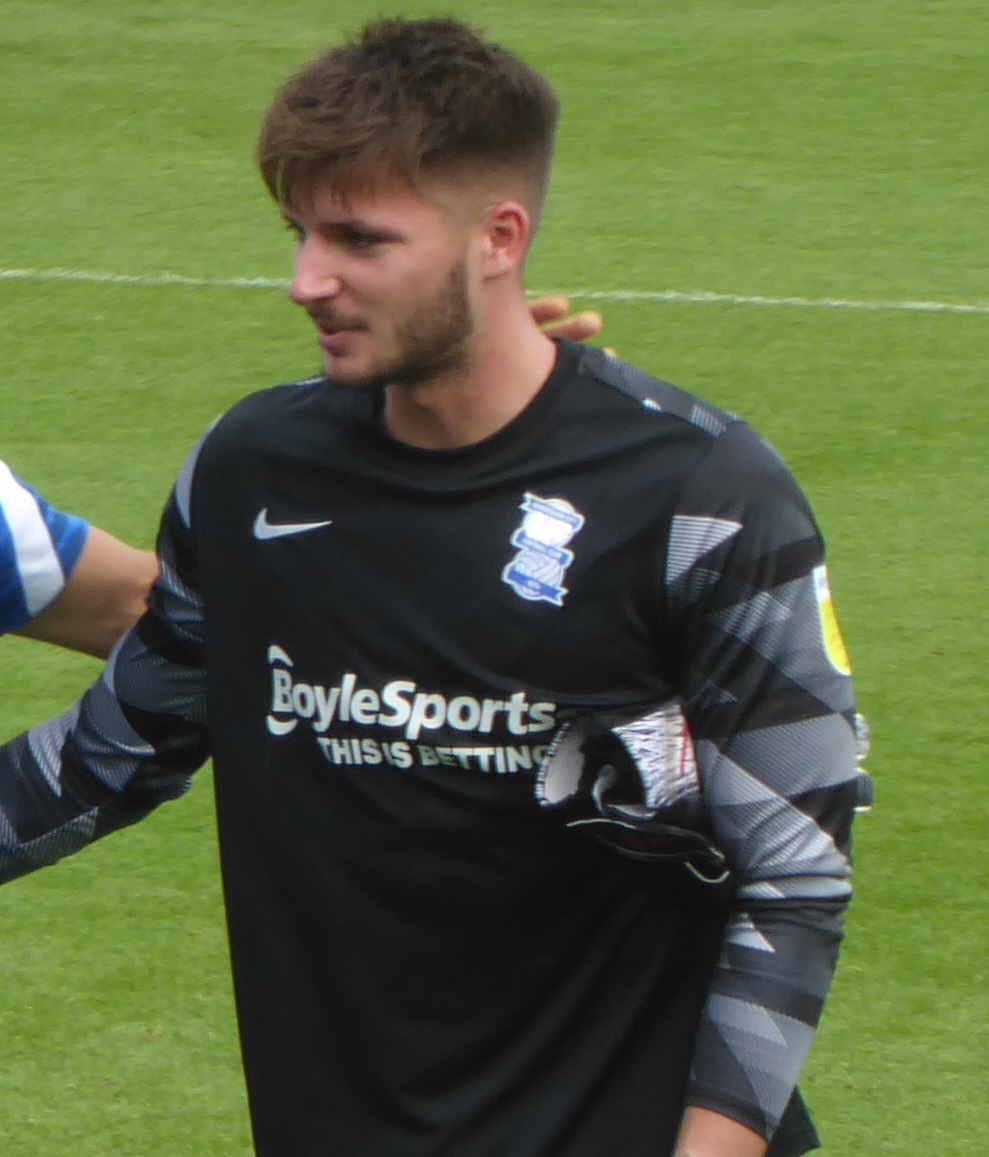
- Sarkic with Birmingham City in 2021

Personal information
- Full name: Matija Sarkic
- Date of birth: 23 July 1997
- Place of birth: Grimsby, England
- Date of death: 15 June 2024 (aged 26)
- Place of death: Budva, Montenegro
- Height: 6 ft 4 in (1.94 m)
- Position: Goalkeeper

Youth career
- 2005–2015: Anderlecht
- 2015–2017: Aston Villa

Senior career*
Years	Team	Apps	(Gls)
2017–2020	Aston Villa	0	(0)
2017–2018	→ Wigan Athletic (loan)	0	(0)
2018–2019	→ Stratford Town (loan)	6	(0)
2019	→ Havant & Waterlooville (loan)	1	(0)
2019–2020	→ Livingston (loan)	14	(0)
2020–2023	Wolverhampton Wanderers	0	(0)
2020–2021	→ Shrewsbury Town (loan)	26	(0)
2021–2022	→ Birmingham City (loan)	23	(0)
2023	→ Stoke City (loan)	8	(0)
2023–2024	Millwall	32	(0)
Total		110	(0)

International career
2013	Montenegro U17	3	(0)
2014–2016	Montenegro U19	12	(0)
2015–2018	Montenegro U21	6	(0)
2019–2024	Montenegro	9	(0)
- * Club domestic league appearances and goals

Matija Sarkic (Montenegrin: Матија Шаркић, Matija Šarkić; 23 July 1997 – 15 June 2024) was a professional footballer who played as a goalkeeper.

Born in England to a British mother and a Montenegrin father, Sarkic represented Montenegro at youth and senior international level. Sarkic came through the academy sides of Anderlecht and Aston Villa. While at Aston Villa, he spent time on loan at a number of English and Scottish clubs: Wigan Athletic, for whom he made his Football League debut; non-league clubs Stratford Town and Havant & Waterlooville; and Livingston of the Scottish Premiership. He signed for Wolverhampton Wanderers in 2020, and spent time on loan at Shrewsbury Town and Birmingham City, where he was voted Player of the Season, and Stoke City. In 2023, he joined EFL Championship club Millwall, where he became the first-choice goalkeeper.

== Early and personal life ==
Sarkic was born in England, in Grimsby, Lincolnshire. His father, Bojan Šarkić, is a Montenegrin diplomat who, as of October 2017, was the country's ambassador to the European Union. He previously served as ambassador to the United Kingdom and to Belgium. His mother, Natalie Šarkić-Todd, is British and works at a European media network. Matija had a twin brother, Oliver, with whom he played during his spell at Anderlecht.

== Club career ==
=== Early career and Aston Villa ===
Sarkic left the youth academy of Belgian club Anderlecht, signing a three-year contract with English club Aston Villa on 1 September 2015, joining their under-21 side. He was the goalkeeper for Villa's under-21 team who reached the Premier League 2 Division Two play-off final in the 2015–16 season. In April 2017, he was named on the bench for a league match against Reading as cover for Sam Johnstone following an injury to Mark Bunn.

Šarkić joined Wigan Athletic on 31 August 2017 on a season-long loan, going on to make 3 appearances, all in cup competitions, and saving a penalty on his debut against Middlesbrough U21 in the EFL Trophy. In December 2018, he joined Stratford Town on a youth loan.

On 26 June 2019, Sarkic signed for Scottish Premiership club Livingston on what was intended to be a season-long loan, but he was recalled by Aston Villa on 3 January 2020, as their first-choice goalkeeper Tom Heaton had suffered a knee injury.

Sarkic was offered a contract extension at Aston Villa in 2020 but turned down the offer to look for first-team opportunities elsewhere, having seen experienced goalkeeper Pepe Reina brought in as cover for the injured Heaton. Sarkic was formally released by Aston Villa at the end of the 2019–20 season.

=== Wolverhampton Wanderers ===
Sarkic signed for Villa's Premier League rivals Wolverhampton Wanderers on 27 July 2020 on a three-year contract.

==== Shrewsbury Town (loan) ====
On 2 September 2020, Sarkic joined League One club Shrewsbury Town on a season-long loan. He made his debut on 12 September, starting in a goalless draw away at Portsmouth. He kept 11 clean sheets in 29 games across all competitions for the Shrews before returning to Wolves on 6 May 2021; he had competed for a starting position against Harry Burgoyne during his loan.

==== Birmingham City (loan) ====
Sarkic joined Championship club Birmingham City on 26 July 2021 on loan for the season. With previous first-choice goalkeeper Neil Etheridge still recovering from COVID-19, Sarkic started the opening-day fixture away to Sheffield United and kept a clean sheet as Birmingham won 1–0. He retained his place in the starting eleven even after Etheridge's return to fitness, kept ten clean sheets, and missed only one of Birmingham's 24 league matches. Near the end of what proved to be his last appearance, on 2 January 2022, he dislocated a shoulder throwing the ball out to a defender. The injury required surgery which would keep him out for the rest of the season, and he returned to his parent club for treatment and rehabilitation. Despite only being at the club for the first half of the season, he was voted Birmingham City's Player of the Season for 2021–22.

==== Return to Wolves ====
Although Wolverhampton Wanderers' goalkeeping coach, Tony Roberts, thought Sarkic's progress would be better served by playing regularly on another loan, he signed a new three-year contract, and technical director Scott Sellars said that he would remain at the club as backup and competition for José Sá. He made his first-team debut on 23 August 2022, in the EFL Cup second-round 2–1 win against Preston North End.

==== Stoke City (loan) ====
On 25 January 2023 Sarkic joined Championship club Stoke City on loan for the remainder of the 2022–23 season. Sarkic took over from Jack Bonham as first-choice keeper until he suffered injury against Sunderland on 4 March 2023. He returned from his injury on the final day of the season at Watford. In July 2023, Stoke agreed a fee with Wolves for Sarkic, however they were unable to agree personal terms so they decided to sign Mark Travers instead.

=== Millwall ===
Sarkic joined Millwall on 3 August 2023 for an undisclosed fee. He made his debut on 5 August, starting in a 1–0 away win over Middlesbrough. He made 33 appearances for Millwall during the 2023–24 season, as the team finished thirteenth in the EFL Championship table.

== International career ==
Sarkic represented Montenegro U17 at the 2013 UEFA European Under-17 Championship. He won the bronze medal at the 2017 Valeri Lobanovsky Memorial Tournament. On 19 November 2019, he made his debut for the Montenegrin senior team under coach Faruk Hadžibegić in a 2–0 friendly win against Belarus. Sarkic made his first competitive appearance for his country in a 2022 World Cup qualifier away to the Netherlands, who won 4–0.

On 5 June 2024, Sarkic played his final game, starting in a 2–0 friendly defeat to Belgium; on the occasion, he was named man of the match for his performance, which included nine saves.

== Death ==
In the early morning of 15 June 2024, Sarkic collapsed at an apartment in Budva, Montenegro; his long-term partner Phoebe, former Aston Villa teammate Oscar Borg and his girlfriend called an ambulance. Borg's girlfriend, a nurse, administered CPR until an ambulance arrived and paramedics then attempted their own resuscitation, but without success. His family was told that he suffered sudden heart failure. He was pronounced dead at the age of 26. FIFA president Gianni Infantino wrote a letter of condolence to the Football Association of Montenegro, and President of Montenegro Jakov Milatović paid tribute. In July 2024, Millwall announced that they would retire the number 20 shirt in Sarkic's honour.

== Career statistics ==
=== Club ===
Appearances and goals by club, season and competition
Club	Season	League			National cup (Note: Includes FA Cup, Scottish Cup)		League cup (Note: EFL Cup, Scottish League Cup)		Other		Total	
Club	Season	Division	Apps	Goals	Apps	Goals	Apps	Goals	Apps	Goals	Apps	Goals
Aston Villa	2017–18	Championship	0	0	0	0	0	0	0	0	0	0
Aston Villa	2018–19	Championship	0	0	0	0	0	0	0	0	0	0
Aston Villa	2019–20	Premier League	0	0	0	0	0	0	0	0	0	0
Aston Villa	Total		0	0	0	0	0	0	0	0	0	0
Wigan Athletic (loan)	2017–18	League One	0	0	2	0	0	0	1 (Note: Appearance(s) in EFL Trophy)	0	3	0
Stratford Town (loan)	2018–19	Southern League Premier Division Central	6	0	0	0	—		1 (Note: Appearance in Southern League Cup)	0	7	0
Havant & Waterlooville (loan)	2018–19	National League	1	0	0	0	—		0	0	1	0
Livingston (loan)	2019–20	Scottish Premiership	14	0	0	0	4	0	0	0	18	0
Wolverhampton Wanderers	2020–21	Premier League	0	0	0	0	0	0	—		0	0
Wolverhampton Wanderers	2021–22	Premier League	0	0	0	0	0	0	—		0	0
Wolverhampton Wanderers	2022–23	Premier League	0	0	1	0	2	0	—		3	0
Wolverhampton Wanderers	Total		0	0	1	0	2	0	0	0	3	0
Shrewsbury Town (loan)	2020–21	League One	26	0	2	0	0	0	1	0	29	0
Birmingham City (loan)	2021–22	Championship	23	0	0	0	0	0	—		23	0
Stoke City (loan)	2022–23	Championship	8	0	0	0	0	0	—		8	0
Millwall	2023–24	Championship	32	0	1	0	0	0	—		33	0
Career total			110	0	6	0	6	0	3	0	125	0

=== International ===
Appearances and goals by national team and year
National team	Year	Apps	Goals
Montenegro	2019	1	0
Montenegro	2020	0	0
Montenegro	2021	4	0
Montenegro	2022	1	0
Montenegro	2023	1	0
Montenegro	2024	2	0
Total		9	0

== Honours ==
Aston Villa U23

- Premier League Cup: 2017–18

Individual

- Birmingham City Player of the Season: 2021–22
