= Marcel Langer =

German footballer

Personal information
- Date of birth: 16 February 1997 (age 29)
- Place of birth: Stadthagen, Germany
- Height: 1.82 m (6 ft 0 in)
- Position: Midfielder

Team information
- Current team: Hannoverscher SC
- Number: 14

Youth career
- 2014–2016: Hannover 96

Senior career*
Years	Team	Apps	(Gls)
2016–2018	Hannover 96 II	41	(0)
2018–2020	Schalke 04 II	27	(1)
2020	Heart of Midlothian	2	(0)
2021	VfB Germania Halberstadt	0	(0)
2021–	Hannoverscher SC	141	(21)
- * Club domestic league appearances and goals as of 22 September 2026

Marcel Langer (born 16 February 1997) is a German professional footballer who plays as a midfielder for Hannoverscher SC.

He came through the Hannover and Schalke youth systems before signing for Heart of Midlothian in January 2020.

== Career statistics ==
As of 1 June 2020

Appearances and goals by club, season and competition
Club	Season	League			Cup		Other		Total	
Club	Season	Division	Apps	Goals	Apps	Goals	Apps	Goals	Apps	Goals
Hannover 96 II	2016–17	Regionalliga Nord	11	0	–		–		11	0
Hannover 96 II	2017–18	Regionalliga Nord	30	0	–		–		30	0
Hannover 96 II	Total		41	0	–		–		41	0
Schalke 04 II	2018–19	Oberliga Westfalen	18	1	–		–		18	1
Schalke 04 II	2019–20	Regionalliga West	9	0	–		–		9	0
Schalke 04 II	Total		27	1	–		–		27	1
Heart of Midlothian	2019–20	Scottish Premiership	2	0	1	0	–		3	0
Career total			70	1	1	0	–		71	1
