= Rory Currie =

Scottish footballer

Personal information
- Date of birth: 20 February 1998 (age 28)
- Place of birth: Lanark, Scotland
- Position: Striker

Youth career
- 2007–2011: Rangers
- 2011–2015: Celtic
- 2015–2016: Rangers

Senior career*
Years	Team	Apps	(Gls)
2016–2020	Heart of Midlothian	10	(0)
2018–2019	→ East Fife (loan)	18	(6)
2019	→ Forfar Athletic (loan)	7	(0)
2020	→ Linfield (loan)	5	(0)
2020–2022	Brechin City	19	(3)
2022–2023	Tranent Juniors	0	(0)
- * Club domestic league appearances and goals as of 11:49, 3 August 2021 (UTC)

Rory Currie (born 20 February 1998) is a Scottish footballer who previously played for Lowland Football League club Tranent Juniors as a striker, currently a free agent. He has previously played for Heart of Midlothian, East Fife, Forfar Athletic, Linfield, Brechin City and Tranent Juniors.

== Career ==
Currie began his football career with Celtic's youth teams before leaving to join the Rangers Academy in January 2016 on a contract until the end of the 2015–16 season.

Currie was released by Rangers in May 2016 but joined Heart of Midlothian. On 28 November 2016, he made his professional debut for Hearts as a 75th-minute substitute during a 3–0 home win against Motherwell. He followed this a month later with his second league appearance against Aberdeen on 30 December.

In January 2017, he was named as one of the Daily Record's Scottish footballing prospects for 2017 alongside Tony Gallagher, Matthew Knox, Ronan Hughes, Liam Burt and Jack Aitchison. Currie suffered a serious knee ligament injury in November 2017. He was subsequently loaned to East Fife, Forfar Athletic and Linfield.

Currie was released by Hearts after the 2019/20 season and was signed by Brechin City in August 2020.

== Career statistics ==
As of match played 23 October 2021

Appearances and goals by club, season and competition
Club	Season	League			Scottish Cup		League Cup		Other		Total	
Club	Season	Division	Apps	Goals	Apps	Goals	Apps	Goals	Apps	Goals	Apps	Goals
Heart of Midlothian	2016–17	Premiership	9	0	2	1	—		—		11	1
Heart of Midlothian	2017–18	Premiership	1	0	—		1	0	—		2	0
Heart of Midlothian	2018–19	Premiership	—		—		—		—		0	0
East Fife	2018–19	League One	18	6	3	1	—		3	1	24	8
Forfar	2019–20	League One	7	0	—		—		—		7	0
Brechin City	2020–21	League Two	19	1	—		4	1	—		23	2
Brechin City	2021–22	Highland League	?	?	1	0	4	0	1	0	6	0
Career total			54	7	6	2	9	1	4	1	73	11
