= Ibrahima Savane =

Guinean footballer (born 1993)

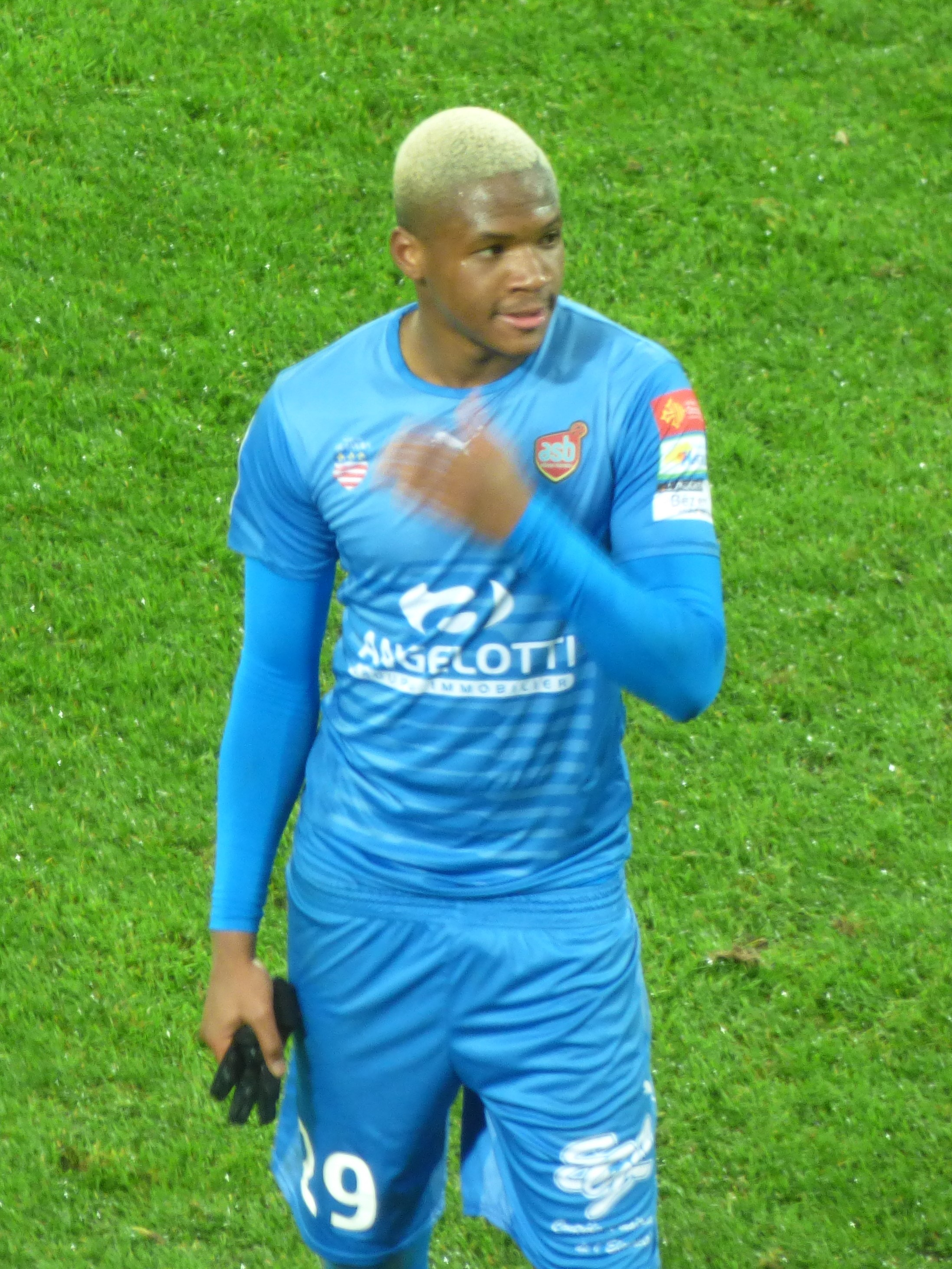
- Savane in 2019

Personal information
- Date of birth: 10 September 1993 (age 33)
- Place of birth: Touba, Guinea
- Height: 1.81 m (5 ft 11 in)
- Position: Left-back

Team information
- Current team: Le Pays du Valois

Senior career*
Years	Team	Apps	(Gls)
2013–2015	Noisy-le-Sec	16	(2)
2015–2017	UJAMP	19	(3)
2016–2019	Béziers	54	(5)
2019	Livingston	1	(0)
2020	Avranches	3	(0)
2020–2021	Cholet	19	(1)
2021–2023	Sedan	23	(2)
2023	Paris 13 Atletico	0	(0)
2023–2024	FC 93	5	(0)
2024–	Le Pays du Valois	9	(0)
- * Club domestic league appearances and goals as of 23 November 2024

Ibrahima Savane (born 10 September 1993) is a Guinean professional footballer who plays as a left-back for French Championnat National 3 club Le Pays du Valois.

== Early life ==
Savane was born in Touba, Guinea, and moved to Ivry-sur-Seine, France, at the age of one. He briefly returned to Guinea from age 11 to 13. He began his footballing career as a forward, but developed successfully as a left-back.

== Club career ==
Savane played amateur football with Olympique Noisy-le-Sec and UJA Maccabi Paris Métropole before signing for Béziers in the summer of 2016.

He made his Ligue 2 debut for Béziers in a 2–0 win over AS Nancy on 27 July 2018.

On 16 July 2019, Savane joined Scottish Premiership side Livingston on a two-year deal on a free transfer from Béziers. He left Scotland in November, having been unable to settle in the country.

In January 2020, he trialled with 3. Liga side SG Sonnenhof Großaspach, and Laval, before signing for Avranches on 31 January 2020.

In June 2020 he moved to fellow Championnat National side SO Cholet, signing a one-year contract with an option for an extra year should the club achieve promotion.

After not playing in the first half of the 2021–22 season, on 2 December 2021 he signed with Sedan, also in Championnat National.
