= Aymen Souda =

French footballer (born 1993)

Personal information
- Date of birth: 28 February 1993 (age 33)
- Place of birth: Nice, France
- Height: 1.78 m (5 ft 10 in)
- Position: Forward

Team information
- Current team: Dobrudzha
- Number: 10

Senior career*
Years	Team	Apps	(Gls)
2012–2013	Paraná	1	(0)
2014–2015	Étoile du Sahel	4	(0)
2015	Kasserine	3	(0)
2016	Lokomotiv GO	10	(1)
2016	Lokomotiv Plovdiv	2	(0)
2017–2018	Pirin Blagoevgrad	21	(3)
2018–2019	Dunărea Călărași	17	(0)
2019–2020	Livingston	19	(2)
2021	Sète	13	(2)
2021–2022	Orléans	9	(2)
2022–2023	RC Grasse	24	(9)
2023–2025	Pirin Blagoevgrad	56	(19)
2025	Botev Vratsa	12	(0)
2025-2026	Al-Qasim SC	6	(0)
2026	Dobrudzha	5	(0)
- * Club domestic league appearances and goals as of 13 October 2026

Aymen Souda (born 28 February 1993) is a French professional footballer who plays as a forward for Bulgarian club Dobrudzha.

== Career ==
Souda was born in Nice. He trained originally with Nice, he has previously played in Brasil, Tunisia, Bulgaria, Romania and Scotland.

In February 2021, Souda signed with Sète.

In June 2022, Souda moved down to the fourth-tier Championnat National 2 and signed with RC Grasse.

== Personal life ==
Born in France, Souda is of Tunisian descent.
