= Henry Robinson =

Henry Robinson may refer to:

== Academics ==
- Henry Robinson (writer) (c. 1604–1664), English writer on religious tolerance
- Henry S. Robinson (1914–2003), American archaeologist

== Arts and entertainment ==
- Henry Crabb Robinson (1775–1867), British diarist
- Henry Peach Robinson (1830–1901), British photographer
- Henry Morton Robinson (1898–1961), American novelist
- Spike Robinson (Henry Berthold Robinson, 1930–2001), jazz saxophonist
- Henry R. Robinson, American lithographer and publisher

== Religion ==
- Henry Robinson (bishop) (c. 1553–1616), Bishop of Carlisle, 1598–1616
- Henry Robinson (clergyman) (1819–1887), Church of England clergyman
- Henry Douglas Robinson (1859–1913), missionary bishop of the Episcopal Diocese of Nevada
- H. Wheeler Robinson (1872–1945), English minister and theologian

== Sports ==
- Basil Robinson (cricketer) (Henry Basil Oswin Robinson, 1919–2012), Canadian cricketer
- Henry Robinson (Yorkshire cricketer) (1858–1909), cricketer
- Henry Robinson (Nottinghamshire cricketer) (1863–1938), English cricketer
- Henry Robinson (New South Wales cricketer) (1864–1931), New South Wales player
- Henry Robinson (footballer) (1909–?), English footballer
- Henry W. Robinson (1893–?), American college football player
- Frazier Robinson (Henry Frazier Robinson, 1910–1997), American baseball player

== Others ==
- Sir Henry Robinson, 1st Baronet (1857–1927), Irish civil servant
- Henry Robinson (spy) (1897–1944), intelligence agent of the Comintern
- H. Russell Robinson (1920–1978) (born Henry Russell Robinson), British military armourer and historian

== See also ==
- Harry Robinson (disambiguation)
- Robinson (name)
