= Harry Robinson =

Harry Robinson may refer to:

- Harry Robinson (rugby union) (born 1993), Welsh rugby union player
- Harry Robertson (musician) (1932–1996), British musician, bandleader, music director and composer, a.k.a. Harry Robinson
- Harry Orman Robinson (1872–1933), American football coach
- Harry Robinson (RAF officer) (1898–1926), World War I flying ace
- Harry G. Robinson III (born 1942), African American architect and professor of architecture
- Harry Robinson (footballer) (born 2000), Northern Irish footballer

== See also ==
- Henry Robinson (disambiguation)
- Harold Robinson (disambiguation)
