= 2020–21 Motherwell F.C. season =

Motherwell
2020–21 season
- Chairman: James McMahon
- Manager: Stephen Robinson (Until 31 December); Keith Lasley (Interim) (31 December - 7 January); Graham Alexander (From 7 January)
- Stadium: Fir Park
- Premiership: 8th
- Scottish Cup: Quarter-finals
- League Cup: Second round
- UEFA Europa League: Third qualifying round vs Hapoel Be'er Sheva
- Top goalscorer: League: Devante Cole (11); All: Devante Cole (12)
Home colours	Away colours

The 2020–21 season was Motherwell's thirty-sixth consecutive season in the top flight of Scottish football, having been promoted from the Scottish First Division at the end of the 1984–85 season.

== Season review ==
=== Pre-season ===
On 17 June, UEFA announced that all UEFA Europa League qualifying and playoffs rounds would be played over one-leg, instead of the usual two, with Motherwell's First Round match taking place on 27 August.

On 23 June, Declan Gallagher was announced as the club's new captain, with Trevor Carson being appointed vice-captain after former captain Peter Hartley left the club at the end of the previous season.

On 24 June, Motherwell announced that they had giving permission to manager Stephen Robinson to discuss the vacant Northern Ireland managerial position.

On 27 June, Charles Dunne signed a new short-term contract with the club, until December 2020.

On 10 July, Chris Long signed a new one-year contract with the club.

==== Transfers ====
On 10 June, Motherwell announced the singing of Ricki Lamie on a contract until the summer of 2022.

On 12 June, Motherwell announced their second singing of the summer, with Jordan White.

On 15 June, Motherwell announced the signing of Nathan McGinley to a two-year contract after his contract with Forest Green Rovers had expired. The following day, Motherwell announced that youngsters Barry Maguire, Harry Robinson and Yusuf Hussain had all signed new one-year contracts with the club.

On 22 June, Motherwell announced the singing of Scott Fox on a one-year contract, after his Partick Thistle contract had expired.

On 24 June, Motherwell announced that they had signed Mark O'Hara on permanent deal from Peterborough United for a nominal fee, with O'Hara signing a two-year contract.

On 3 July, Motherwell announced the return of Jake Hastie on a season-long loan deal from Rangers.

On 29 July, Motherwell announced the signing of Callum Lang on a season-long loan deal from Wigan Athletic.

On 13 August, Motherwell announced the signing of Stephen O'Donnell on a contract until the mid-season transfer window.

On 27 August, David Turnbull left the club to sign for Celtic for a club-record fee, reported to be in the £3,000,000 range.

On 15 September, Jamie Semple joined Scottish League One club Cove Rangers on a season-long loan.

On 18 September, Motherwell signed Robbie Crawford on loan from Livingston until January 2021, whilst Harry Robinson was loaned out to Queen of the South for the remainder of the season.

On 21 September, Ross MacIver joined Greenock Morton on loan for the season.

=== October ===
On 2 October, the day of the game, Motherwell's trip to Kilmarnock was postponed due to an outbreak of COVID-19 within the Kilmarnock squad. Later on the same day, Motherwell announced the departure of Jermaine Hylton to Ross County and the arrival of Devante Cole on a permanent deal until the end of the season.

The same day, the 2020-21 Challenge Cup was cancelled due to the restrictions surrounding the COVID-19 pandemic in Scotland.

On 4 October, Sam Muir moved to Gretna 2008 on loan for the season. On 7 October, Motherwell announced the signing of Aaron Chapman on a contract until the end of the season, and Matthew Connelly joined Falkirk on a short-term loan deal. On 15 October, P. J. Morrison joined Falkirk on loan for the remainder of the season. On 17 October, Motherwell's trip to St Mirren was cancelled after St Mirren informed the SPFL that they could not field a squad.

After Trevor Carson suffered a knee injury that will see him ruled out for 'several months', Motherwell signed Jordan Archer on 28 October to a short-term deal until January 2021.

=== November ===
On 9 November, Tony Watt extended his contract with Motherwell until the summer of 2022.

=== December ===
On 3 December, the SPFL awarded Motherwell a 3-0 technical victory over Kilmarnock in relation to their postponed game scheduled for 2 October, and a 3-0 technical victory over St Mirren in relation to their postponed game scheduled for 17 October. On 26 December, the two technical victories over Kilmarnock and St Mirren were suspended after appeals from both clubs.

On 31 December, Stephen Robinson resigned as Motherwell manager following an 8-game winless streak, with Keith Lasley being appointed Interim Manager.

=== January ===
On 2 January, P. J. Morrison was recalled from his loan at Falkirk.

On 5 January, Motherwell confirmed that Jordan Archer had left the club after his contract had expired, to sign for Middlesbrough. The following day, Callum Lang was recalled from his loan by parent club Wigan Athletic, and goalkeeper Liam Kelly signed on loan from Queens Park Rangers until the end of the season.

On 7 January, Graham Alexander was appointed as Motherwell's new manager. The following day, Ross MacIver was recalled from his loan spell with Greenock Morton.

On 15 January, Motherwell announced the return of Academy graduate, Steven Lawless on a permanent transfer from Burton Albion, until the end of the 2021–22 season.

On 18 January, Motherwells postponed match against Kilmarnock from 2 October was rescheduled for 10 February, and their game against St Mirren originally scheduled for 17 October was rescheduled for 24 February.

On 21 January, Motherwell announced that Jake Carroll had signed a new contract with the club until the summer of 2023, and the signing of Harry Smith on loan from Northampton Town for the remainder of the season.

On 28 January, Jordan White left Motherwell to sign for Ross County. The following day, Motherwell signed Sam Foley from St Mirren on a contract until the end of the season.

=== February ===
On 1 February, Motherwell announced the permanent signing of Robbie Crawford from Livingston on a contract until the end of the season, and the extension of Charles Dunne and Stephen O'Donnells contracts extended until the end of the season. Later that same evening, Motherwell announced that Jamie Semple had been recalled from his loan deal with Cove Rangers, due to the suspension of football below the Championship, and the loan signings of Jordan Roberts from Heart of Midlothian and Eddie Nolan from Crewe Alexandra, both until the end of the season. On 2 February, Queen of the South confirmed that Harry Robinson had returned to Motherwell after his loan spell was ended, and Tyler Magloire joined Motherwell from Blackburn Rovers on loan for the remainder of the season.

=== March ===
On 11 March, Yusuf Hussain joined Brechin City on loan for the remainder of the season, with Ross MacIver joining Partick Thistle on a similar deal the following day.

=== April ===
On 9 April, P. J. Morrison joined Ayr United on an initial seven-day emergency loan deal.

On 13 April, Stephen O'Donnell signed a new two-year contract with Motherwell, keeping him at the club until the summer of 2023.

On 30 April, Graham Alexander was announced as the Scottish Premiership manager of the month for April.

=== May ===
On 17 May, Scott Fox joined Greenock Morton on an emergency loan deal for their Scottish Championship play-off finals against Airdrieonians.

On 24 May, Motherwell announced that Allan Campbell, Aaron Chapman, Findlay Cook, Sam Foley, Declan Gallagher, Paul Hale, Yusuf Hussain, Chris Long, Ross MacIver, Matthew McDonald, Sam Muir, Liam Polworth, Lewis Robertson, Harry Robinson, Sherwin Seedorf, Jamie Semple and Cammy Williamson would all be leaving the club at the end of the season when their contracts expire, whilst Devante Cole, Dean Cornelius, Charles Dunne and Scott Fox had all either been offered new contracts or had been invited back for pre-season training.

== Transfers ==
=== In ===
Date	Position	Nationality	Name	From	Fee	Ref
10 June 2020	DF	(Scotland)	Ricki Lamie	Livingston	Free	
12 June 2020	FW	(Scotland)	Jordan White	Inverness Caledonian Thistle	Free	
15 June 2020	DF	(England)	Nathan McGinley	Forest Green Rovers	Free	
22 June 2020	GK	(Scotland)	Scott Fox	Partick Thistle	Free	
24 June 2020	MF	(Scotland)	Mark O'Hara	Peterborough United	Undisclosed	
13 August 2020	DF	(Scotland)	Stephen O'Donnell	Kilmarnock	Free	
2 October 2020	FW	(England)	Devante Cole	Doncaster Rovers	Free	
7 October 2020	GK	(England)	Aaron Chapman	Peterborough United	Free	
28 October 2020	GK	(Scotland)	Jordan Archer	Fulham	Free	
15 January 2021	MF	(Scotland)	Steven Lawless	Burton Albion	Undisclosed	
29 January 2021	MF	(Republic of Ireland)	Sam Foley	St Mirren	Undisclosed	
1 February 2021	MF	(Scotland)	Robbie Crawford	Livingston	Undisclosed	

=== Loans in ===
Date from	Position	Nationality	Name	From	Date to	Ref.
3 July 2020	FW	(Scotland)	Jake Hastie	Rangers	End of Season	
29 July 2020	FW	(England)	Callum Lang	Wigan Athletic	6 January 2021	
18 September 2020	MF	(Scotland)	Robbie Crawford	Livingston	31 January 2021	
6 January 2021	GK	(Scotland)	Liam Kelly	Queens Park Rangers	End of season	
21 January 2021	FW	(England)	Harry Smith	Northampton Town	End of season	
1 February 2021	FW	(England)	Jordan Roberts	Heart of Midlothian	End of season	
1 February 2021	MF	(Republic of Ireland)	Eddie Nolan	Crewe Alexandra	End of season	
2 February 2021	DF	(England)	Tyler Magloire	Blackburn Rovers	End of season	

=== Out ===
Date	Position	Nationality	Name	To	Fee	Ref.
27 August 2020	MF	(Scotland)	David Turnbull	Celtic	Undisclosed	
2 October 2020	FW	(England)	Jermaine Hylton	Ross County	Undisclosed	
28 January 2021	FW	(Scotland)	Jordan White	Ross County	Undisclosed	
15 June 2021	MF	(Scotland)	Allan Campbell	Luton Town	Undisclosed	

=== Loans out ===
Date from	Position	Nationality	Name	To	Date to	Ref.
15 September 2020	MF	(Scotland)	Jamie Semple	Cove Rangers	1 February 2021	
18 September 2020	FW	(Northern Ireland)	Harry Robinson	Queen of the South	2 February 2021	
21 September 2020	FW	(Scotland)	Ross MacIver	Greenock Morton	8 January 2021	
4 October 2020	DF	(Scotland)	Sam Muir	Gretna 2008	1 February 2021	
7 October 2020	GK	(Scotland)	Matthew Connelly	Falkirk	Short-term	
15 October 2020	GK	(Scotland)	P. J. Morrison	Falkirk	2 January 2021	
11 March 2021	DF	(Scotland)	Yusuf Hussain	Brechin City	End of season	
12 March 2021	FW	(Scotland)	Ross MacIver	Partick Thistle	End of season	
9 April 2021	GK	(Scotland)	P. J. Morrison	Ayr United	16 April 2021	
17 May 2021	GK	(Scotland)	Scott Fox	Airdrieonians	21 May 2021	

=== Released ===
Date	Position	Nationality	Name	Joined	Date	Ref.
5 January 2021	GK	(Scotland)	Jordan Archer	Middlesbrough	5 January 2021	
31 May 2021	GK	(England)	Aaron Chapman	Gillingham	6 July 2021	
31 May 2021	DF	(Republic of Ireland)	Charles Dunne	St Mirren	2 June 2021	
31 May 2021	DF	(Scotland)	Declan Gallagher	Aberdeen	1 June 2021	
31 May 2021	DF	(Scotland)	Yusuf Hussain	Forfar Athletic	2 July 2021	
31 May 2021	DF	(Scotland)	Matthew McDonald	Airdrieonians	7 July 2021	
31 May 2021	DF	(Scotland)	Sam Muir	Dumbarton	12 July 2021	
31 May 2021	DF	(Scotland)	Cammy Williamson	Falkirk	13 July 2021	
31 May 2021	MF	(Republic of Ireland)	Sam Foley	Tranmere Rovers	22 July 2021	
31 May 2021	MF	(Scotland)	Paul Hale	Gretna 2008	1 August 2021	
31 May 2021	MF	(Scotland)	Lewis Robertson			
31 May 2021	MF	(Scotland)	Liam Polworth	Kilmarnock	23 June 2021	
31 May 2021	MF	(Scotland)	Jamie Semple	East Fife	6 August 2021	
31 May 2021	FW	(England)	Devante Cole	Barnsley	8 June 2021	
31 May 2021	FW	(England)	Chris Long	Crewe Alexandra	7 June 2021	
31 May 2021	FW	(Northern Ireland)	Harry Robinson	Clyde	7 June 2021	
31 May 2021	FW	(Scotland)	Findlay Cook	Thomas Night Hawks		
31 May 2021	FW	(Scotland)	Ross MacIver	Partick Thistle	31 May 2021	
31 May 2021	FW	(Suriname)	Sherwin Seedorf	Länk Vilaverdense	31 January 2024	

== Squad ==
As of match played 16 May 2021

No.	Name	Nationality	Position	Date of birth (age)	Signed from	Signed in	Contract ends	Apps.	Goals
Goalkeepers
1	Trevor Carson	(Northern Ireland)	GK	5 March 1988 (aged 33)	Hartlepool United	2017	2022	78	0
12	Scott Fox	(Scotland)	GK	28 June 1987 (aged 33)	Partick Thistle	2020	2021	0	0
13	Liam Kelly	(Scotland)	GK	23 January 1996 (aged 25)	loan from Queens Park Rangers	2021	2021	21	0
23	P. J. Morrison	(Scotland)	GK	1 January 1998 (aged 23)	Academy	2009	2021	0	0
30	Matthew Connelly	(Scotland)	GK	2 March 2003 (aged 18)	Academy	2019	2021	0	0
34	Aaron Chapman	(England)	GK	29 May 1990 (aged 30)	Peterborough United	2020	2021	7	0
Defenders
2	Liam Grimshaw	(England)	DF	2 February 1995 (aged 26)	Preston North End	2017	2022	119	0
3	Jake Carroll	(Republic of Ireland)	DF	11 August 1991 (aged 29)	Cambridge United	2019	2023	42	2
4	Ricki Lamie	(Scotland)	DF	20 June 1993 (aged 27)	Livingston	2020	2022	38	1
5	Nathan McGinley	(England)	DF	15 September 1996 (aged 24)	Forest Green Rovers	2020	2022	24	0
16	Bevis Mugabi	(Uganda)	DF	1 May 1995 (aged 26)	Yeovil Town	2019	2021	38	2
18	Charles Dunne	(Republic of Ireland)	DF	13 February 1993 (aged 28)	Oldham Athletic	2017	2021	78	1
24	David Devine	(Scotland)	DF	20 June 2001 (aged 19)	Academy	2019	2021	1	0
27	Max Johnston	(Scotland)	DF	24 December 2003 (aged 17)	Academy	2020		2	0
28	Yusuf Hussain	(Scotland)	DF	26 April 2001 (aged 20)	Falkirk	2018	2021	0	0
31	Declan Gallagher	(Scotland)	DF	13 February 1991 (aged 30)	Livingston	2019	2021	72	3
33	Stephen O'Donnell	(Scotland)	DF	11 May 1992 (aged 29)	Kilmarnock	2020	2023	41	3
35	Matthew McDonald	(Scotland)	DF	26 August 2002 (aged 18)	Academy	2019	2021	0	0
38	Eddie Nolan	(Republic of Ireland)	DF	5 August 1988 (aged 32)	loan from Crewe Alexandra	2021	2021	0	0
40	Tyler Magloire	(England)	DF	21 December 1998 (aged 22)	loan from Blackburn Rovers	2021	2021	12	0
	Sam Muir	(Scotland)	DF	10 July 2002 (aged 18)	Academy	2019	2021	0	0
	Cameron Wilson	(Scotland)	DF	20 May 2003 (aged 17)	Academy	2019	2021	0	0
Midfielders
6	Allan Campbell	(Scotland)	MF	4 July 1998 (aged 22)	Academy	2016	2021	160	16
7	Mark O'Hara	(Scotland)	MF	12 December 1995 (aged 25)	Peterborough United	2020	2022	53	7
8	Robbie Crawford	(Scotland)	MF	22 June 1994 (aged 26)	Livingston	2021	2021	26	0
14	Steven Lawless	(Scotland)	MF	12 April 1991 (aged 30)	Burton Albion	2021	2022	12	1
15	Barry Maguire	(Scotland)	MF	27 April 1998 (aged 23)	Academy	2015	2021	42	1
19	Liam Polworth	(Scotland)	MF	12 October 1994 (aged 26)	Inverness Caledonian Thistle	2019	2021	62	4
20	Jamie Semple	(Scotland)	MF	17 May 2000 (aged 20)	Academy	2018	2021	6	0
22	Liam Donnelly	(Northern Ireland)	MF	7 March 1996 (aged 25)	Hartlepool United	2018	2022	41	12
26	Dean Cornelius	(Scotland)	MF	11 April 2001 (aged 20)	Hibernian	2018	2021	2	0
37	Sam Foley	(Republic of Ireland)	MF	17 October 1986 (aged 34)	St Mirren	2021	2021	5	1
42	Lewis Robertson	(Scotland)	MF	1 January 2003 (aged 18)	Rangers	2019	2021	0	0
	Paul Hale	(Scotland)	MF	26 January 2003 (aged 18)	Academy		2021	0	0
Forwards
9	Chris Long	(England)	FW	25 February 1995 (aged 26)	Blackpool	2019	2021	66	17
11	Jake Hastie	(Scotland)	FW	18 March 1999 (aged 22)	loan from Rangers	2020	2021	35	7
17	Sherwin Seedorf	(Suriname)	FW	17 March 1998 (aged 23)	Wolverhampton Wanderers	2019	2021	41	3
21	Harry Robinson	(Northern Ireland)	FW	26 September 2000 (aged 20)	Oldham Athletic	2020	2021	2	0
25	Ross MacIver	(Scotland)	FW	28 February 1999 (aged 22)	Ross County	2019	2021	9	1
29	Harry Smith	(England)	FW	18 May 1995 (aged 25)	loan from Northampton Town	2021	2021	5	0
32	Tony Watt	(Scotland)	FW	29 December 1993 (aged 27)	CSKA Sofia	2020	2022	46	9
36	Findlay Cook	(Scotland)	FW	31 May 2002 (aged 18)	Academy		2021	0	0
39	Jordan Roberts	(England)	FW	5 January 1994 (aged 27)	loan from Heart of Midlothian	2021	2021	8	3
44	Devante Cole	(England)	FW	10 May 1995 (aged 26)	Doncaster Rovers	2020	2021	52	16
Left during the season
8	David Turnbull	(Scotland)	MF	10 July 1999 (aged 21)	Academy	2017	2022	41	16
9	Jordan White	(Scotland)	FW	4 February 1992 (aged 29)	Inverness Caledonian Thistle	2020		20	0
13	Jordan Archer	(Scotland)	GK	12 April 1993 (aged 28)	Fulham	2020	2021	4	0
14	Jermaine Hylton	(England)	FW	28 June 1993 (aged 27)	Solihull Moors	2019	2021	41	4
29	Callum Lang	(England)	FW	8 September 1998 (aged 22)	loan from Wigan Athletic	2020	2021	21	5

=== Left club during season ===
Note: Flags indicate national team as defined under FIFA eligibility rules; some limited exceptions apply. Players may hold more than one non-FIFA nationality.

No.	Pos.	Nation	Player
8	MF	SCO	David Turnbull (to Celtic)
9	FW	SCO	Jordan White (to Ross County)
13	FW	SCO	Jordan Archer (to Middlesbrough)

No.	Pos.	Nation	Player
14	FW	ENG	Jermaine Hylton (to Ross County)
29	FW	ENG	Callum Lang (loan return to Wigan Athletic)

== Friendlies ==
11 July 2020	Motherwell	1 – 0	Dundee United	Motherwell
BST (UTC+1)	White 55'	Report

17 July 2020	Motherwell	2 – 3	Kilmarnock	Motherwell
BST (UTC+1)	O'Hara; Watt	Report	Kabamba; Trialist; Kiltie	Stadium: Fir Park

22 July 2020	Rangers	4 – 0	Motherwell	Glasgow
20:00 BST (UTC+1)	Kent 7'; Hagi 10'; Aribo 45'; Lamie 68' (o.g.)	Report		Stadium: Ibrox Stadium

25 July 2020	Motherwell	2 – 2	Hamilton Academical	Motherwell
14:00 BST (UTC+1)	Donnelly 41'; Lamie 70'	Report	McMann 45'; Ogkmpoe 50'	Stadium: Fir Park

== Competitions ==
=== Premiership ===
==== League table ====
Pos	Team	Pld	W	D	L	GF	GA	GD	Pts	Qualification or relegation (Note: Teams play each other three times (33 matches), before the league is split into two groups (the top six and the bottom six).)
6	Livingston	38	12	9	17	42	54	−12	45	
7	St Mirren	38	11	12	15	37	45	−8	45	
8	Motherwell	38	12	9	17	39	55	−16	45	
9	Dundee United	38	10	14	14	32	50	−18	44	
10	Ross County	38	11	6	21	35	66	−31	39	

Rules for classification: 1) Points; 2) Goal difference; 3) Goals scored; 4) Head-to-head points; 5) Head-to-Head goal difference; 6) Play-off (only if deciding champion, UEFA competitions qualification, second stage group allocation or relegation).

==== Results by round ====
Round	1	2	3	4	5	6	7	8	9	10	11	12	13	14	15	16	17	18	19	20	21	22	23	24	25	26	27	28	29	30	31	32	33	34	35	36	37	38
Ground	A	H	H	A	H	A	H	A	H	H	A	H	A	H	A	A	H	A	H	A	A	H	A	A	H	A	A	H	H	A	A	H	A	H	A	H	A	H
Result	L	L	D	D	L	L	W	W	L	W	W	L	D	L	L	L	D	D	L	L	D	D	L	W	W	L	W	L	L	D	W	W	L	W	W	W	D	L
Position	11	10	8	10	10	12	12	8	9	7	7	5	5	5	5	5	6	9	10	11	10	11	11	10	9	9	9	9	9	9	9	9	9	9	7	7	7	8

Updated to match(es) played on 16 May 2021. Source: See Results
A = Away; H = Home; W = Win; D = Draw; L = Loss

==== Results summary ====
Overall								Home						Away					
Pld	W	D	L	GF	GA	GD	Pts	W	D	L	GF	GA	GD	W	D	L	GF	GA	GD
38	12	9	17	39	55	−16	45	6	3	10	20	31	−11	6	6	7	19	24	−5

Last updated: 16 May 2021.
Source: Results

==== Results ====
3 August 2020 1	Ross County	1 – 0	Motherwell	Dingwall
19:45 BST (UTC+1)	Stewart 24' (pen.); Paton (yellow card) 57'; Reid (yellow card) 75'	Report	Gallagher (yellow card) 24'; Donnelly (penalty missed) 73'; Lang (red card) 87'	Stadium: Victoria Park; Attendance: 0 Referee: Nick Walsh
Note: Match played behind closed doors due to the COVID-19 pandemic in Scotland.

8 August 2020 2	Motherwell	0 – 1	Dundee United	Motherwell
15:00 BST (UTC+1)	Campbell (yellow card) 71'; Turnbull (yellow card) 78'	Report	Reynolds 52'	Stadium: Fir Park; Attendance: 0 Referee: Steven McLean
Note: Match played behind closed doors due to the COVID-19 pandemic in Scotland.

12 August 2020 3	Motherwell	2 – 2	Livingston	Motherwell
19:45 BST (UTC+1)	Turnbull 8'; Lamie (yellow card) 11'; Campbell 35'; White (yellow card) 61'	Report	Dykes 10' (pen.); Sibbald (yellow card) 41'; Forrest 69'	Stadium: Fir Park; Attendance: 0 Referee: Colin Steven
Note: Match played behind closed doors due to the COVID-19 pandemic in Scotland.

15 August 2020 4	Hibernian	0 – 0	Motherwell	Edinburgh
17:30 BST (UTC+1)		Report	Campbell (yellow card) 72'	Stadium: Easter Road; Attendance: 0 Referee: Greg Aitken
Note: Match played behind closed doors due to the COVID-19 pandemic in Scotland.

22 August 2020 5	Motherwell	0 – 1	Hamilton Academical	Motherwell
15:00 BST (UTC+1)	O'Donnell (yellow card) 81'; Gallagher (yellow card) 82'	Report	Templeton (yellow card) 46'; Odoffin 86'	Stadium: Fir Park; Attendance: 0 Referee: Alan Muir
Note: Match played behind closed doors due to the COVID-19 pandemic in Scotland.

30 August 2020 6	Celtic	3 – 0	Motherwell	Glasgow
15:00 BST (UTC+1)	Brown (yellow card) 22'; Forrest 40'; Ajeti 74'; Jullien 90+2'	Report	Lamie (yellow card) 55'; Grimshaw (yellow card) 89'	Stadium: Celtic Park; Attendance: 0 Referee: Don Robertson
Note: Match played behind closed doors due to the COVID-19 pandemic in Scotland.

12 September 2020 7	Motherwell	1 – 0	St Johnstone	Motherwell
15:00 BST (UTC+1)	Campbell 4', (yellow card) 87'; O'Hara (yellow card) 36'; Watt (yellow card) 48'; Carson (yellow card) 69'	Report		Stadium: Fir Park; Attendance: 0 Referee: Euan Anderson
Note: Match played behind closed doors due to the COVID-19 pandemic in Scotland.

20 September 2020 8	Aberdeen	0 – 3	Motherwell	Aberdeen
15:00 BST (UTC+1)	Logan (yellow card) 47'; McCrorie (yellow card) 56'; Ferguson (yellow card) 71'	Report	O'Hara 4' (pen.); Long 8'; Mugabi 22'	Stadium: Pittodrie Stadium; Attendance: 0 Referee: John Beaton
Note: Match played behind closed doors due to the COVID-19 pandemic in Scotland.

27 September 2020 9	Motherwell	1 – 5	Rangers	Motherwell
12:00 BST (UTC+1)	Lamie (yellow card) 31'; Edmundson 87' (o.g.)	Report	Tavernier 12' (pen.), 37' (pen.); Jones 28'; Itten 75', 80'	Stadium: Fir Park; Attendance: 0 Referee: Bobby Madden
Note: Match played behind closed doors due to the COVID-19 pandemic in Scotland.

24 October 2020 12	Motherwell	4 – 0	Ross County	Motherwell
15:00 BST (UTC+1)	Watt 37'; Long (yellow card) 41'; O'Hara 54' (pen.); Lang 64'; Maguire (yellow card) 65'; Cole 72'	Report	Vigurs (yellow card) 53'	Stadium: Fir Park; Attendance: 0 Referee: Craig Napier
Note: Match played behind closed doors due to the COVID-19 pandemic in Scotland.

31 October 2020 13	Livingston	0 – 2	Motherwell	Livingston
15:00 GMT (UTC)	Guthrie (yellow card) 45+1'; Bartley (yellow card) 66'	Report	Lang 22'; Watt 45+2', (yellow card) 73'; Maguire (yellow card) 70'	Stadium: Almondvale Stadium; Attendance: 0 Referee: John Beaton
Note: Match played behind closed doors due to the COVID-19 pandemic in Scotland.

8 November 2020 14	Motherwell	1 – 4	Celtic	Motherwell
12:00 GMT (UTC)	Maguire (yellow card) 43'; Gallgher 72'; Watt (yellow card) 81'; Cole (yellow card) 53'	Report	Elyounoussi 8', 27', 76'; Ntcham 86'	Stadium: Fir Park; Attendance: 0 Referee: Andrew Dallas
Note: Match played behind closed doors due to the COVID-19 pandemic in Scotland.

21 November 2020 15	St Johnstone	1 – 1	Motherwell	Perth
15:00 GMT (UTC)	May 34' (pen.); Bryson (yellow card) 40'; McNamara (yellow card) 81'; McCann (yellow card) 86'	Report	O'Hara 17'; Gallagher (yellow card) 81'	Stadium: McDiarmid Park; Attendance: 0 Referee: Steven Kirkland
Note: Match played behind closed doors due to the COVID-19 pandemic in Scotland.

5 December 2020 16	Motherwell	0 – 3	Hibernian	Motherwell
15:00 GMT (UTC)	Watt (yellow card) 82'	Report	Boyle 59'; Doidge 88'; S. McGinn (yellow card) 89', (goal) 90+5'	Stadium: Fir Park; Attendance: 0 Referee: Andrew Dallas
Note: Match played behind closed doors due to the COVID-19 pandemic in Scotland.

12 December 2020 17	Motherwell	0 – 1	St Mirren	Motherwell
15:00 GMT (UTC)	Gallagher (yellow card) 30'	Report	McGrath 13' (yellow card) 90+5'; Erhahon (yellow card) 67'; Tait (yellow card) 69'; Erwin (yellow card) 90'	Stadium: Fir Park; Attendance: 0 Referee: Euan Anderson
Note: Match played behind closed doors due to the COVID-19 pandemic in Scotland.

19 December 2020 18	Rangers	3 – 1	Motherwell	Glasgow
15:00 GMT (UTC)	Roofe 73', 90+4'; Itten 82'	Report	Lang 6'; Lamie (yellow card) 77'; Archer (yellow card) 82'	Stadium: Ibrox Stadium; Attendance: 0 Referee: Don Robertson
Note: Match played behind closed doors due to the COVID-19 pandemic in Scotland.

23 December 2020 19	Motherwell	0 – 0	Aberdeen	Motherwell
18:15 GMT (UTC)		Report	Kennedy (yellow card) 89'	Stadium: Fir Park; Attendance: 0 Referee: Greg Aitken
Note: Match played behind closed doors due to the COVID-19 pandemic in Scotland.

26 December 2020 20	Dundee United	1 – 1	Motherwell	Dundee
15:00 GMT (UTC)	Robson (yellow card) 46'; Fuchs (yellow card) 83'; Smith (yellow card) 87'; Clark 90+2'	Report	Watt 9'	Stadium: Tannadice Park; Attendance: 0 Referee: Bobby Madden
Note: Match played behind closed doors due to the COVID-19 pandemic in Scotland.

30 December 2020 21	Motherwell	0 – 2	Kilmarnock	Motherwell
18:15 GMT (UTC)	O'Hara (red card) 52'; Crawford (yellow card) 56'; Campbell (yellow card) 63'	Report	Tshibola (yellow card) 32'; Kiltie 41'; Whitehall 53' (pen.)	Stadium: Fir Park; Attendance: 0 Referee: John Beaton
Note: Match played behind closed doors due to the COVID-19 pandemic in Scotland.

2 January 2021 22	Hamilton Academical	3 – 0	Motherwell	Hamilton
15:00 GMT (UTC)	Hodson 10'; Callachan 49'; Smith 65'; McMann (yellow card) 84'	Report	Gallagher (yellow card) 61'	Stadium: New Douglas Park; Attendance: 0 Referee: Colin Steven
Note: Match played behind closed doors due to the COVID-19 pandemic in Scotland.

9 January 2021 23	St Mirren	1 – 1	Motherwell	Paisley
15:00 GMT (UTC)	Doyle-Hayes (yellow card) 47'; McGrath 79' (pen.)	Report	O'Hara (yellow card) 14'; Cole 27'	Stadium: St Mirren Park; Attendance: 0 Referee: Bobby Madden
Note: Match played behind closed doors due to the COVID-19 pandemic in Scotland.

17 January 2021 24	Motherwell	1 – 1	Rangers	Motherwell
12:00 GMT (UTC)	Cole 21', (yellow card) 65'; Carroll (yellow card) 50'; Lawless (yellow card) 74'	Report	Hagi (yellow card) 47'; Itten 72'	Stadium: Fir Park; Attendance: 0 Referee: Don Robertson
Note: Match played behind closed doors due to the COVID-19 pandemic in Scotland.

23 January 2021 25	Aberdeen	2 – 0	Motherwell	Aberdeen
15:00 GMT (UTC)	Hoban 15'; Wright (yellow card) 25'; Ojo (yellow card) 27'; Considine 77'	Report	Gallagher (yellow card) 6'; Polworth (yellow card) 26' (red card) 48'	Stadium: Pittodrie Stadium; Attendance: 0 Referee: Craig Napier
Note: Match played behind closed doors due to the COVID-19 pandemic in Scotland.

27 January 2021 26	Ross County	1 – 2	Motherwell	Dingwall
18:00 GMT (UTC)	Shaw 14'; Hjelde (yellow card) 45'; Morris (yellow card) 56'; Draper (yellow card) 59'; Hylton (yellow card) 60'; Vigurs (yellow card) 75'	Report	Cole 51'; Mugabi 72'	Stadium: Victoria Park; Attendance: 0 Referee: Nick Walsh
Note: Match played behind closed doors due to the COVID-19 pandemic in Scotland.

3 February 2021 27	Motherwell	2 – 1	Dundee United	Motherwell
18:00 GMT (UTC)	Cole 23'; Long 28'	Report	Harkes (yellow card) 36'; Edwards 80'	Stadium: Fir Park; Attendance: 0 Referee: Don Robertson
Note: Match played behind closed doors due to the COVID-19 pandemic in Scotland.

6 February 2021 28	Celtic	2 –1	Motherwell	Glasgow
15:00 GMT (UTC)	Welsh 2'; Édouard 50'	Report	Campbell 66'; Watt (yellow card) 68'; Cole (yellow card) 90'; Smith (yellow card) 90+1'	Stadium: Celtic Park; Attendance: 0 Referee: Nick Walsh
Note: Match played behind closed doors due to the COVID-19 pandemic in Scotland.

10 February 2021 10	Kilmarnock	0 – 1	Motherwell	Kilmarnock
18:00 GMT (UTC)		Report	Campbell 71'; Watt (yellow card) 78'; O'Donnell (yellow card) 81'	Stadium: Rugby Park; Attendance: 0 Referee: Willie Collum
Note: Match postponed in the afternoon of 2 October, due to an outbreak of COVID-19 within the Kilmarnock squad. Match awarded to Motherwell on 3 December, but appealed on 26 December. Match rescheduled for 10 February on 18 January.

13 February 2021 29	Motherwell	1 – 4	Hamilton Academical	Motherwell
15:00 GMT (UTC)	O'Donnell (red card) 18'; Watt (yellow card) 52'; O'Hara 68'; Magloire (yellow card) 82'; Maguire (yellow card) 90+1'	Report	Anderson 7'; Callachan 19' (pen.); Ogkmpoe 31' (yellow card) 61'; Moyo 64'; S.Martin (yellow card) 72'; A.Martin (yellow card) 90+2'	Stadium: Fir Park; Attendance: 0 Referee: David Munro
Note: Match played behind closed doors due to the COVID-19 pandemic in Scotland.

20 February 2021 33	Motherwell	0 – 3	St Johnstone	Motherwell
15:00 GMT (UTC)	Long (yellow card) 37'	Report	Melamed 19', 50' (pen.); Kerr 45'	Stadium: Fir Park; Attendance: 0 Referee: John Beaton
Note: Match played behind closed doors due to the COVID-19 pandemic in Scotland.

24 February 2021 11	St Mirren	0 – 0	Motherwell	Paisley
18:00 GMT (UTC)	Durmuş (yellow card) 21'; Shaughnessy (yellow card) 61'	Report	Maguire (yellow card) 42'	Stadium: St Mirren Park; Attendance: 0 Referee: Kevin Clancy
Note: Match cancelled on 17 October, due St Mirren being unable to field a squad. Match awarded to Motherwell on 3 December, but appealed on 26 December. Match rescheduled for 24 February on 18 January. Match played behind closed doors due to the COVID-19 pandemic in Scotland.

27 February 2021 31	Hibernian	0 – 2	Motherwell	Edinburgh
15:00 GMT (UTC)	Boyle (yellow card) 80'; Hanlon (yellow card) 81'	Report	Roberts 25'; Cole 46'	Stadium: Easter Road; Attendance: 0 Referee: Alan Muir
Note: Match played behind closed doors due to the COVID-19 pandemic in Scotland.

6 March 2021 32	Motherwell	3 – 1	Livingston	Motherwell
15:00 GMT (UTC)	Cole 31' (pen.), 59'; O'Donnell (yellow card) 63'; Long 69' (yellow card) 78'	Report	Bartley (yellow card) 47'; Guthrie (yellow card) 58'; Fitzwater 60'; Sibbald (yellow card) 70'; Devlin (yellow card) 78'	Stadium: Fir Park; Attendance: 0 Referee: Colin Steven
Note: Match played behind closed doors due to the COVID-19 pandemic in Scotland.

20 March 2021 33	Kilmarnock	4 – 1	Motherwell	Kilmarnock
15:00 GMT (UTC)	Lafferty 1' (yellow card) 58'; McGowan (yellow card) 45'; McKenzie 55'; Burke 57'; Power (yellow card) 72'; Pinnock 83'	Report	Maguire 8'; Roberts (yellow card) 42'	Stadium: Rugby Park; Attendance: 0 Referee: Alan Muir
Note: Match played behind closed doors due to the COVID-19 pandemic in Scotland.

10 April 2021 34	Motherwell	1 – 0	St Mirren	Motherwell
15:00 BST (UTC+1)	Cole 62'; Campbell (yellow card) 67'	Report	McGrath (penalty missed) 35'; Erhahon (yellow card) 48'; Shaughnessy (yellow card) 81'; McCarthy (yellow card) 90+1'	Stadium: Fir Park; Attendance: 0 Referee: Kevin Clancy
Note: Match played behind closed doors due to the COVID-19 pandemic in Scotland.

21 April 2021 35	Hamilton Academical	0 – 1	Motherwell	Hamilton
19:45 BST (UTC+1)	Odoffin (yellow card) 7'; Callachan (yellow card) 31'; Hughes (red card) 33'	Report	Long (yellow card) 26'; O'Hara 37'	Stadium: New Douglas Park; Attendance: 0 Referee: Kevin Clancy
Note: Match played behind closed doors due to the COVID-19 pandemic in Scotland.

1 May 2021 36	Motherwell	2 – 0	Kilmarnock	Motherwell
15:00 BST (UTC+1)	Cole 47'; Campbell (yellow card) 77'; Long (yellow card) 78'; McGinley (yellow card) 79'; O'Donnell 85'	Report	Broadfoot (yellow card) 85'	Stadium: Fir Park; Attendance: 0 Referee: Bobby Madden
Note: Match played behind closed doors due to the COVID-19 pandemic in Scotland.

12 May 2021 37	Dundee United	2 – 2	Motherwell	Dundee
19:45 BST (UTC+1)	Shankland 13' (penalty missed) 20'; Meekison 33'; Butcher (yellow card) 85'	Report	Long (yellow card) 30' (goal) 54'; Cole (yellow card) 59' (goal) 90+1'; Lamie (yellow card) 90+7'	Stadium: Tannadice Park; Attendance: 0 Referee: David Dickinson
Note: Match played behind closed doors due to the COVID-19 pandemic in Scotland.

16 May 2021 38	Motherwell	1 – 2	Ross County	Motherwell
12:00 BST (UTC+1)	Magloire (yellow card) 3'; Foley 7'; Cole (yellow card) 76'; Watt (yellow card) 79'	Report	Vigurs (yellow card) 1' (goal) 49'; Tremarco (yellow card) 33'; Gardyne 65'; Tillson (yellow card) 86'	Stadium: Fir Park; Attendance: 0 Referee: Steven McLean
Note: Match played behind closed doors due to the COVID-19 pandemic in Scotland.

=== Scottish Cup ===
3 April 2021 Third round	Formartine United	0 – 5	Motherwell	Pitmedden
15:00 BST (UTC+1)	Lawrenceat (yellow card) 85'	Report	Roberts (yellow card) 28' (goal) 41', 52'; Long 34'; Cole 63'; Campbell 76'	Stadium: North Lodge Park; Attendance: 0 Referee: Mike Roncone
Note: Match originally scheduled for 30 January, but postponed on 11 January 2021. Match played behind closed doors due to the COVID-19 pandemic in Scotland.

16 April 2021 Fourth round	Motherwell	1 – 1 (5 – 3 p)	Greenock Morton	Motherwell
19:00 BST (UTC+1)	Lamie (yellow card) 73'; O'Donnell 120+1'	Report	Jacobs (yellow card) 36'; Fjørtoft (yellow card) 120' (goal) 120+3'	Stadium: Fir Park; Attendance: 0 Referee: Willie Collum
	Penalties
	O'Hara (penalty scored); Cole (penalty scored); Long (penalty scored); Hastie (penalty scored); O'Donnell (penalty scored)		Orsi (penalty scored); Jacobs (penalty scored); McGinty (penalty missed); McLean (penalty scored)
Note: Match played behind closed doors due to the COVID-19 pandemic in Scotland.

24 April 2021 Quarter-final	Hibernian	2 – 2 (a.e.t.) (4 – 2 p)	Motherwell	Edinburgh
17:00 BST (UTC+1)	Gogić (yellow card) 45' (yellow-red card) 120+2'; Doidge 52'; Irvine 80' (yellow card) 115'; Boyle (yellow card) 88'; Hallberg (yellow card) 120+2'	Report	Lamie 82'; Watt 88'; O'Hara (yellow card) 112'; McGinley (yellow card) 120'	Stadium: Easter Road; Attendance: 0 Referee: John Beaton
	Penalties
	Boyle (penalty scored); Hallberg (penalty scored); McGinn (penalty scored); Nisbet (penalty missed); Porteous (penalty scored)		Cole (penalty scored); O'Hara (penalty missed); Lawless (penalty missed); Long (penalty scored)
Note: Match played behind closed doors due to the COVID-19 pandemic in Scotland.

=== League Cup ===
28 November 2020 Second round	Motherwell	1 – 2	St Johnstone	Motherwell
15:00 GMT (UTC)	Gallagher (yellow card) 10'; Watt 61'	Report	O'Halloran (yellow card) 41'; Gordon (yellow card) 57'; Hendry 68'; Wotherspoon 77'	Stadium: Fir Park; Attendance: 0 Referee: Alan Muir

=== UEFA Europa League ===
==== Qualifying rounds ====
27 August 2020 First Qualifying Round	Motherwell (Scotland)	5 – 1	(Northern Ireland) Glentoran	Motherwell, Scotland
19:45 BST (UTC+1)	Lang 58'; Lamie (yellow card) 63'; O'Donnell 72'; Polworth 75'; Watt 78'; Long 87'	Report	Clucas (yellow card) 10' (yellow-red card) 52'; McDonagh (yellow card) 76'; R.McDaid 90' (pen.); K.Cowan (yellow card) 90+3'	Stadium: Fir Park; Attendance: 0 Referee: Bram Van Driessche (Belgium)
Note: Match played behind closed doors due to the COVID-19 pandemic in Scotland and as per UEFA regulations.

17 September 2020 Second Qualifying Round	Coleraine (Northern Ireland)	2 – 2 (a.e.t.) (0 – 3 p)	(Scotland) Motherwell	Coleraine, Northern Ireland
19:30 BST (UTC+1)	B.Doherty 49' (pen.), 90' (pen.); Carson (yellow card) 75'	Report	Lang 16', (yellow card) 71'; Watt 37'; O'Hara (yellow card) 49'; Lamie (yellow card) 84'; Mugabi (red card) 89'	Stadium: The Showgrounds; Attendance: 0 Referee: Antti Munukka (Finland)
	Penalties
	I.Parkhill (penalty missed); L.Kane (penalty missed); G.McConaghie (penalty missed)		(penalty scored) O'Hara; (penalty scored) Watt; (penalty scored) O'Donnell
Note: Match played behind closed doors due to the COVID-19 pandemic in Northern Ireland and as per UEFA regulations.

24 September 2020 Third Qualifying Round	Hapoel Be'er Sheva (Israel)	3 – 0	(Scotland) Motherwell	Petah Tikva, Israel
18:30 BST (UTC+1)	Kabha (yellow card) 15'; Vítor 43'; Taha (yellow card) 45+3'; Dadia (yellow card) 54'; Agudelo (yellow card) 56'; Bareiro (yellow card) 58'; Josué 71' (pen.); Acolatse 82'	Report	Watt (yellow card) 45+3'; O'Donnell (yellow card) 56'; Gallagher (yellow card) 69' (yellow-red card) 70'	Stadium: HaMoshava Stadium; Attendance: 0 Referee: Serhiy Boyko (Ukraine)
Note: Match played at the HaMoshava Stadium in Petah Tikva instead of Hapoel Be'er Sheva's regular stadium Turner Stadium, Be'er Sheva, which was temporarily closed for structural problems fixing on its roof. Match played behind closed doors due to the COVID-19 pandemic in Israel and as per UEFA regulations.

== Squad statistics ==
=== Appearances ===
As of match played 16 May 2021

No.	Pos	Nat	Player	Total		Premiership		Scottish Cup		League Cup		UEFA Europa League	
No.	Pos	Nat	Player	Apps	Goals	Apps	Goals	Apps	Goals	Apps	Goals	Apps	Goals
1	GK	(Northern Ireland) NIR	Trevor Carson	15	0	12	0	0	0	0	0	3	0
2	DF	(England) ENG	Liam Grimshaw	17	0	12+2	0	0	0	0+1	0	2	0
3	DF	(Republic of Ireland) IRL	Jake Carroll	15	0	14+1	0	0	0	0	0	0	0
4	DF	(Scotland) SCO	Ricki Lamie	38	1	27+4	0	2+1	1	1	0	3	0
5	DF	(England) ENG	Nathan McGinley	24	0	12+7	0	3	0	0	0	2	0
6	MF	(Scotland) SCO	Allan Campbell	40	5	34	4	3	1	0	0	3	0
7	MF	(Scotland) SCO	Mark O'Hara	33	5	23+4	5	1+1	0	1	0	3	0
8	MF	(Scotland) SCO	Robbie Crawford	26	0	19+3	0	3	0	1	0	0	0
9	FW	(England) ENG	Chris Long	35	6	19+10	4	3	1	0	0	2+1	1
11	FW	(Scotland) SCO	Jake Hastie	17	0	7+7	0	0+2	0	0	0	0+1	0
13	GK	(Scotland) SCO	Liam Kelly	21	0	18	0	3	0	0	0	0	0
14	MF	(Scotland) SCO	Steven Lawless	10	0	3+4	0	2+1	0	0	0	0	0
15	MF	(Scotland) SCO	Barry Maguire	30	1	16+10	1	1+1	0	0	0	0+2	0
16	DF	(Uganda) UGA	Bevis Mugabi	25	2	19+2	2	0+1	0	1	0	2	0
17	FW	(Suriname) SUR	Sherwin Seedorf	13	0	6+4	0	0	0	0+1	0	0+2	0
19	MF	(Scotland) SCO	Liam Polworth	25	1	18+3	0	0	0	1	0	3	1
21	FW	(Northern Ireland) NIR	Harry Robinson	2	0	0+1	0	0	0	0	0	0+1	0
22	MF	(Northern Ireland) NIR	Liam Donnelly	1	0	1	0	0	0	0	0	0	0
26	MF	(Scotland) SCO	Dean Cornelius	1	0	0+1	0	0	0	0	0	0	0
27	DF	(Scotland) SCO	Max Johnston	2	0	1+1	0	0	0	0	0	0	0
29	FW	(England) ENG	Harry Smith	5	0	0+5	0	0	0	0	0	0	0
31	DF	(Scotland) SCO	Declan Gallagher	36	1	27+2	1	3	0	1	0	3	0
32	FW	(Scotland) SCO	Tony Watt	40	7	28+7	3	0+1	1	1	1	2+1	2
33	DF	(Scotland) SCO	Stephen O'Donnell	41	3	34	1	3	1	1	0	3	1
34	GK	(England) ENG	Aaron Chapman	7	0	4+2	0	0	0	1	0	0	0
37	MF	(Republic of Ireland) IRL	Sam Foley	5	1	3+1	1	0+1	0	0	0	0	0
39	FW	(England) ENG	Jordan Roberts	8	3	5+2	1	1	2	0	0	0	0
40	DF	(England) ENG	Tyler Magloire	12	0	8+2	0	2	0	0	0	0	0
44	FW	(England) ENG	Devante Cole	31	12	24+3	11	3	1	1	0	0	0
Players away from the club on loan:
25	FW	(Scotland) SCO	Ross MacIver	1	0	0+1	0	0	0	0	0	0	0
Players who left Motherwell during the season:
8	MF	(Scotland) SCO	David Turnbull	5	1	5	1	0	0	0	0	0	0
9	FW	(Scotland) SCO	Jordan White	20	0	3+15	0	0	0	0+1	0	0+1	0
13	GK	(Scotland) SCO	Jordan Archer	4	0	4	0	0	0	0	0	0	0
14	FW	(England) ENG	Jermaine Hylton	5	0	0+5	0	0	0	0	0	0	0
29	FW	(England) ENG	Callum Lang	21	5	12+5	3	0	0	1	0	2+1	2

=== Goal scorers ===
As of match played 16 May 2021

Ranking	Nation	Position	Number	Name	Scottish Premiership	Scottish Cup	League Cup	UEFA Europa League	Total
1	FW	(England)	44	Devante Cole	11	1	0	0	12
2	FW	(Scotland)	32	Tony Watt	3	1	1	2	7
3	FW	(England)	29	Callum Lang	3	1	0	2	6
4	MF	(Scotland)	7	Mark O'Hara	5	0	0	0	5
4	MF	(Scotland)	6	Allan Campbell	4	1	0	0	5
4	FW	(England)	9	Chris Long	4	0	0	1	5
7	FW	(England)	39	Jordan Roberts	1	2	0	0	3
7	DF	(Scotland)	33	Stephen O'Donnell	1	1	0	1	3
9	DF	(Uganda)	16	Bevis Mugabi	2	0	0	0	2
10	MF	(Scotland)	8	David Turnbull	1	0	0	0	1
10	MF	(Scotland)	19	Liam Polworth	0	0	0	1	1
10	DF	(Scotland)	33	Declan Gallagher	1	0	0	0	1
10	MF	(Scotland)	15	Barry Maguire	1	0	0	0	1
10	MF	(Republic of Ireland)	37	Sam Foley	1	0	0	0	1
10	DF	(Scotland)	4	Ricki Lamie	0	1	0	0	1
10				Own goal	1	0	0	0	1
TOTALS					39	8	1	7	55

=== Clean sheets ===
As of match played 16 May 2021

Ranking	Nation	Position	Number	Name	Scottish Premiership	Scottish Cup	League Cup	UEFA Europa League	Total
1	GK	(Scotland)	13	Liam Kelly	5	1	0	0	6
2	GK	(Northern Ireland)	1	Trevor Carson	4	0	0	0	4
3	GK	(England)	34	Aaron Chapman	2	0	0	0	2
4	GK	(Scotland)	13	Jordan Archer	1	0	0	0	1
TOTALS					11	1	0	0	12

Carson & Chapman both played in Motherwells's 4-0 victory over Ross County on 24 October 2020

=== Disciplinary record ===
As of match played 16 May 2021

Number	Nation	Position	Name	Premiership		Scottish Cup		League Cup		UEFA Europa League		Total	
Number	Nation	Position	Name	Booked	Sent off (straight red)	Booked	Sent off (straight red)	Booked	Sent off (straight red)	Booked	Sent off (straight red)	Booked	Sent off (straight red)
1	(Northern Ireland)	GK	Trevor Carson	1	0	0	0	0	0	0	0	1	0
2	(England)	DF	Liam Grimshaw	1	0	0	0	0	0	0	0	1	0
3	(Republic of Ireland)	DF	Jake Carroll	1	0	0	0	0	0	0	0	1	0
4	(Scotland)	DF	Ricki Lamie	5	0	1	0	0	0	2	0	8	0
5	(England)	DF	Nathan McGinley	1	0	1	0	0	0	0	0	2	0
6	(Scotland)	MF	Allan Campbell	6	0	0	0	0	0	0	0	6	0
7	(Scotland)	MF	Mark O'Hara	2	1	1	0	0	0	1	0	4	1
8	(Scotland)	MF	Robbie Crawford	1	0	0	0	0	0	0	0	1	0
9	(England)	FW	Chris Long	6	0	0	0	0	0	0	0	6	0
14	(Scotland)	MF	Steven Lawless	1	0	0	0	0	0	0	0	1	0
15	(Scotland)	MF	Barry Maguire	5	0	0	0	0	0	0	0	5	0
16	(Uganda)	DF	Bevis Mugabi	0	0	0	0	0	0	0	1	0	1
19	(Scotland)	MF	Liam Polworth	1	1	0	0	0	0	0	0	1	1
29	(England)	FW	Harry Smith	1	0	0	0	0	0	0	0	1	0
31	(Scotland)	DF	Declan Gallagher	6	0	0	0	1	0	2	1	9	1
32	(Scotland)	FW	Tony Watt	8	0	0	0	0	0	1	0	9	0
33	(Scotland)	DF	Stephen O'Donnell	3	1	0	0	0	0	1	0	4	1
39	(England)	FW	Jordan Roberts	1	0	1	0	0	0	0	0	2	0
40	(England)	DF	Tyler Magloire	2	0	0	0	0	0	0	0	2	0
44	(England)	FW	Devante Cole	5	0	0	0	0	0	0	0	5	0
Players who left Motherwell during the season:
8	(Scotland)	MF	David Turnbull	1	0	0	0	0	0	0	0	1	0
9	(Scotland)	FW	Jordan White	1	0	0	0	0	0	0	0	1	0
13	(Scotland)	GK	Jordan Archer	1	0	0	0	0	0	0	0	1	0
29	(England)	FW	Callum Lang	0	1	0	0	0	0	1	0	1	1
			TOTALS	60	4	4	0	1	0	8	2	72	6

== Awards ==
=== Manager of the Month ===
Month	Name	Award
April	Graham Alexander	Won

== See also ==
- List of Motherwell F.C. seasons
