= Harold Robinson =

Harold Robinson may refer to:

- Harold E. Robinson (1932–2020), botanist and entomologist
- Hal Robinson (born 1952), classical double bass player
- Harold Roper Robinson (1889–1955), physicist and university administrator
- Harold Robinson (baseball), American baseball player
- Harold B. Robinson (1922–1994), bishop of the Episcopal Diocese of Western New York
- Harold Robinson (athlete) (1930–2006), pioneering African-American athlete in Kansas State Wildcats
- Harold Claude Robinson, Northern Irish politician for Larne
- Harold Robinson (dancer) (1919–2012), New Zealand ballet dancer and choreographer

== See also ==
- Harry Robinson (disambiguation)
