= P. J. Morrison =

Scottish footballer (born 1998)

Personal information
- Full name: Peter Joseph Morrison
- Date of birth: 27 February 1998 (age 28)
- Place of birth: Bellshill, Scotland
- Position: Goalkeeper

Team information
- Current team: Cliftonville
- Number: 31

Youth career
- 2009–2017: Motherwell

Senior career*
Years	Team	Apps	(Gls)
2017–2022	Motherwell	0	(0)
2017–2018	→ Clyde (loan)	0	(0)
2018–2019	→ Albion Rovers (loan)	32	(0)
2019	→ Cowdenbeath (loan)	4	(0)
2020	→ Falkirk (loan)	6	(0)
2021	→ Ayr United (loan)	4	(0)
2022	→ Alloa Athletic (loan)	9	(0)
2022–2023	Falkirk	10	(0)
2023–2025	Alloa Athletic	65	(0)
2025–	Cliftonville	31	(0)
- * Club domestic league appearances and goals as of 29 April 2026

Peter Joseph 'P. J.' Morrison (born 27 February 1998) is a Scottish footballer who plays as a goalkeeper for NIFL Premiership club Cliftonville.

He was part of the Motherwell Scottish Youth Cup winning side in 2016 and experienced first-team football during loan spells with Clyde, Albion Rovers, Cowdenbeath and Falkirk, where he kept four clean sheets in eight appearances at the start of the 2020–21 season.

He was called up to the Scotland Under-21 squad for two matches in 2020, but was an unused substitute in two matches.

On 2 June 2022, he was signed to Falkirk for a season.

== Career statistics ==
=== Club ===
As of Match played 17 January 2026

Appearances and goals by club, season and competition
Club	Season	League			National cup (Note: Includes Scottish Cup and Irish Cup)		League Cup (Note: Includes Scottish League cup and NIFL Cup)		Other		Total	
Club	Season	Division	Apps	Goals	Apps	Goals	Apps	Goals	Apps	Goals	Apps	Goals
Motherwell B	2016–17	—			—		—		2 (Note: Appearance(s) in Scottish Challenge Cup)	0	2	0
Motherwell B	2017–18	—			—		—		2	0	2	0
Motherwell B	2018–19	—			—		—		1	0	1	0
Motherwell B	2019–20	—			—		—		2	0	2	0
Motherwell B	Total		—		—		—		7	0	7	0
Motherwell	2017–18	Scottish Premiership	0	0	0	0	0	0	—		0	0
Motherwell	2018–19	Scottish Premiership	0	0	0	0	0	0	—		0	0
Motherwell	2019–20	Scottish Premiership	0	0	0	0	0	0	—		0	0
Motherwell	2020–21	Scottish Premiership	0	0	0	0	0	0	0	0	0	0
Motherwell	2021–22	Scottish Premiership	0	0	0	0	0	0	—		0	0
Motherwell	Total		0	0	0	0	0	0	0	0	0	0
Clyde (loan)	2017–18	Scottish League Two	0	0	0	0	—		—		0	0
Albion Rovers (loan)	2018–19	Scottish League Two	28	0	0	0	—		—		28	0
Cowdenbeath (loan)	2019–20	Scottish League Two	4	0	0	0	—		—		4	0
Falkirk (loan)	2020–21	Scottish League One	6	0	0	0	2	0	—		8	0
Ayr United (loan)	2020–21	Scottish Championship	4	0	—		—		—		4	0
Alloa Athletic (loan)	2021–22	Scottish League One	9	0	—		—		—		9	0
Falkirk	2022–23	Scottish League One	10	0	2	0	4	0	2 (Note: One appearance in Scottish Challenge Cup; One appearance in Scottish Championship play-offs)	0	18	0
Alloa Athletic	2023–24	Scottish League One	29	0	2	0	4	0	2 (Note: Appearance(s) in Scottish Championship play-offs)	0	37	0
Alloa Athletic	2024–25	Scottish League One	36	0	1	0	4	0	0	0	41	0
Alloa Athletic	Total		65	0	3	0	8	0	2	0	78	0
Cliftonville	2025–26	NIFL Premiership	20	0	0	0	1	0	0	0	21	0
Career total			146	0	5	0	15	0	11	0	177	0
