= Jamie Semple =

Scottish footballer

Personal information
- Date of birth: 17 May 2001 (age 25)
- Place of birth: Bellshill, Scotland
- Height: 1.83 m (6 ft 0 in)
- Positions: Midfielder; forward

Team information
- Current team: Cumbernauld Colts

Youth career
- 2014–2019: Motherwell

Senior career*
Years	Team	Apps	(Gls)
2019–2021	Motherwell	8	(0)
2020–2021	→ Cove Rangers (loan)	5	(0)
2021–2022	East Fife	9	(1)
2022-2026	Gala Fairydean Rovers		
2026-	Cumbernauld Colts		

International career^{‡}
2017–2018	Scotland U17	8	(1)
2018	Scotland U18	1	(0)
2019	Scotland U19	2	(0)
- * Club domestic league appearances and goals as of 20:33, 25 October 2021 (UTC) ‡ National team caps and goals as of 22:05, 10 September 2019 (UTC)

Jamie Semple (born 17 May 2001) is a Scottish professional footballer who plays as a forward. He has previously played for Motherwell, Cove Rangers, East Fife, Gala Fairydean Rovers and now plays with Cumbernauld Colts.

== Club career ==
Semple joined the Motherwell youth Academy in 2014, while being part of the Scottish FA performance School as a pupil at Braidhurst High School.

He made his first team debut for Motherwell on 27 April 2019, setting up the winning goal in injury time for David Turnbull in a 4–3 win at home to Dundee.

On 15 September 2020, Semple joined Scottish League One club Cove Rangers on a season-long loan. His loan was ended on 1 February 2021, when he was recalled by Motherwell.

Semple was released by Motherwell at the end of the 2020–21 season and he signed for East Fife in August 2021.

== International career ==
Semple has played at under-17, under-18 and under-19 level for Scotland.

== Career statistics ==
As of 25 October 2021

Appearances and goals by club, season and competition
Club	Season	League			Scottish Cup		League Cup		Other		Total	
Club	Season	Division	Apps	Goals	Apps	Goals	Apps	Goals	Apps	Goals	Apps	Goals
Motherwell	2018–19	Scottish Premiership	3	0	0	0	0	0	1 (Note: Appearances for Motherwell under-21s in the Scottish Challenge Cup, in which age-restricted teams from the SPFL Premiership clubs compete against senior clubs.)	0	4	0
Motherwell	2019–20	Scottish Premiership	0	0	0	0	3	0	1	1	4	1
Motherwell	2020–21	Scottish Premiership	0	0	0	0	0	0	0	0	0	0
Motherwell	Total		3	0	0	0	3	0	2	1	8	1
Cove Rangers (loan)	2020–21	Scottish League One	5	0	0	0	4	1	0	0	9	1
East Fife	2021–22	Scottish League One	9	1	0	0	0	0	2 (Note: Appearances in the Scottish Challenge Cup)	0	1	1
Career total			17	1	0	0	7	1	4	1	28	3
