= Archie Howarth =

English footballer

Personal information
- Full name: Archibald Howarth
- Date of birth: March quarter 1911
- Place of birth: Bury, England
- Date of death: 20 July 1966 (aged 55)
- Place of death: Heywood, England
- Position: Outside forward

Senior career*
Years	Team	Apps	(Gls)
1930	Nelson	8	(2)
1930–1931	Great Harwood	?	(?)
- * Club domestic league appearances and goals

Archie Howarth (March quarter 1911 – 20 July 1966) was an English footballer who played as an outside forward. Born in Bury, he joined Football League Third Division North side Nelson at the age of 19. Howarth made his League debut on 6 September 1930, scoring in the 3–1 win against Darlington at Seedhill. He scored again in the following match, a 1–2 defeat to Lincoln City, and kept his place in the team for the next six games. However, after a 0–2 loss away at Doncaster Rovers on 11 October 1930, he was replaced by Henry Robinson and never made another appearance.

In December 1930, Howarth requested to leave Nelson and subsequently joined Lancashire Combination club Great Harwood. In his later years, he worked at the Victoria Hotel in Bury as the mine host. Howarth died in Heywood, on 20 July 1966, aged 55.
