= Tyler Magloire =

English footballer (born 1998)

Personal information
- Full name: Tyler Jordan Magloire
- Date of birth: 21 December 1998 (age 27)
- Place of birth: Bradford, England
- Height: 6 ft 0 in (1.83 m)
- Position: Defender

Team information
- Current team: Buxton

Youth career
- 2007–2019: Blackburn Rovers

Senior career*
Years	Team	Apps	(Gls)
2019–2022	Blackburn Rovers	6	(0)
2019–2020	→ Rochdale (loan)	2	(0)
2020–2021	→ Hartlepool United (loan)	9	(1)
2021	→ Motherwell (loan)	10	(0)
2022	→ Northampton Town (loan)	10	(0)
2022–2025	Northampton Town	39	(3)
2025–2026	Workington	8	(0)
2026	Port Vale	9	(0)
2026–	Buxton	0	(0)
- * Club domestic league appearances and goals as of 16:02, 2 May 2026 (UTC)

Tyler Jordan Magloire (born 21 December 1998) is an English professional footballer who plays as a defender for National League North club Buxton. He is known for his pace.

Magloire began his career at Blackburn Rovers, making his debut in the Championship in March 2019. He subsequently spent time on loan at Rochdale, Hartlepool United, Motherwell, and Northampton Town. He joined Northampton Town on a three-year deal in July 2022 and was a member of the 2022–23 League Two promotion-winning squad. He was out of action with ruptured ligaments from February 2023 to July 2024. After a spell without a club, he played non-League football with Workington from November 2025. He returned to the English Football League with Port Vale in January 2026, then dropped back into non-League with Buxton ten months later.

== Career ==
=== Blackburn Rovers ===
Magloire signed a two-year professional deal with Blackburn Rovers in June 2017 after making 21 appearances for the Under-18s in 2015–16. He had first joined the Academy at the age of nine. He signed a new three-and-a-half-year deal in February 2019. He helped Damien Johnson's development squad to secure the Premier League 2 Division 2 title in 2017–18. He captained the Under-23s to victory over Burnley in the Lancashire Senior Cup the following season. On 12 March 2019, Magloire started for Blackburn in the Championship and helped keep a clean sheet in a 3–0 victory over Wigan Athletic.

On 8 August 2019, Magloire joined League One club Rochdale on loan for the 2019–20 season. Blackburn manager Tony Mowbray said that Magloire was not yet ready for Championship football after struggling against Sheffield Wednesday when he had faced Steven Fletcher and Atdhe Nuhiu. On 4 January, he was substituted 30 minutes into a 1–1 draw with Newcastle United in an FA Cup third round tie at Spotland after being unable to handle Ghana international winger Christian Atsu whilst playing at right-back. The decision paid off for manager Brian Barry-Murphy, as Dale earned a lucrative replay by drawing the game. On 29 January, he was recalled by Blackburn after sustaining a groin injury, which subsequently required surgery and saw him spend a lengthy spell on the sidelines.

Magloire sustained a hamstring injury in late September 2020, ending his prospects of joining a Football League club on loan. On 6 November 2020, Magloire signed for National League side Hartlepool United on loan until 9 January. Hartlepool had suffered injuries to first-choice centre-back partners Gary Liddle and Timi Odusina. He played 10 National League games for Hartlepool, not missing a match during his time at Victoria Park. Pools manager Dave Challinor had hoped to re-sign Magloire on loan in January to further help with their promotion push, though Rovers needed him as cover following injuries to other centre-backs. Rovers went on to loan him out to a different club.

On 2 February 2021, Magloire joined Scottish Premiership side Motherwell on loan until the end of the 2020–21 season. Well manager Graham Alexander said he would provide "competition for the right side of defence". Magloire featured 12 times for the Steelmen, who were reportedly looking at bringing him back to Fir Park after his loan spell ended. He said his time in Scottish football had "toughened me up and made me into a better player". He featured five times for Rovers in the first half of the 2021–22 campaign. The club took up a 12-month option on his contract in May 2022. However, his first-team opportunities at Ewood Park were limited by the emergence of Hayden Carter and the success of other loan signings.

=== Northampton Town ===
On 18 January 2022, Magloire joined League Two side Northampton Town on loan until the end of the 2021–22 season. Manager Jon Brady said the Cobblers had beaten a League One club in the race to secure his signature. His loan spell was ended early by a shoulder injury sustained in March. On 28 July 2022, Magloire returned to Northampton Town for an undisclosed fee, signing a three-year contract. Brady said he had shown "huge potential". He was ruled out for an entire season when he ruptured his anterior cruciate ligament and medial collateral ligament in February 2023, finally making his return to fitness in July 2024 after 17 months out of action. He made six league starts in the 2024–25 campaign. Magloire was one of 11 players that left Sixfields upon the expiry of their contracts in June 2025.

In July 2025, he joined Bradford City on trial, participating in the club's training camp in Austria. He also trained with the Professional Footballers' Association (PFA) to maintain his fitness levels.

=== Workington ===
On 8 November 2025, Magloire joined Northern Premier League Premier Division club Workington on non-contract terms. Manager Billy Barr had coached him at the Blackburn Rovers Academy. Magloire was named man of the match on his debut, a 3–2 win over Hyde United at Borough Park, the first home game that Reds had won that season. He departed the club on 26 January 2026, having been offered a chance to return to the Football League. He had previously had a trial with a Scottish Championship club, believed to be Ayr United.

=== Port Vale ===
Magloire began training with Port Vale, who were managed by former Northampton boss Jon Brady. On 30 January 2026, he signed a short-term deal, with an option to extend. He made seven league starts in the 2025–26 season, which culminated in relegation, though performed well in FA Cup wins over Sunderland and Bristol City. He was released upon the expiry of his contract. He was part of the 45-man Professional Footballers' Association (PFA) free agent squad in July 2026.

=== Buxton ===
On 21 November 2026, Magliore joined National League North club Buxton.

== Style of play ==
Magloire is an extremely pacey defender. He can play at centre-back or right-back. His top speed was recorded at 10.6 metres per second, making him as fast as Kylian Mbappé.

== Career statistics ==
As of match played 2 May 2026

Appearances and goals by club, season and competition
Club	Season	League			FA Cup		EFL Cup		Other		Total	
Club	Season	Division	Apps	Goals	Apps	Goals	Apps	Goals	Apps	Goals	Apps	Goals
Blackburn Rovers	2018–19	Championship	2	0	0	0	0	0	—		2	0
Blackburn Rovers	2019–20	Championship	0	0	0	0	0	0	—		0	0
Blackburn Rovers	2020–21	Championship	0	0	0	0	0	0	—		0	0
Blackburn Rovers	2021–22	Championship	4	0	0	0	1	0	—		5	0
Blackburn Rovers	Total		6	0	0	0	1	0	0	0	7	0
Rochdale (loan)	2019–20	League One	2	0	1	0	2	0	0	0	5	0
Hartlepool United (loan)	2020–21	National League	9	1	1	0	—		1 (Note: Appearance in the FA Trophy)	0	11	1
Motherwell (loan)	2020–21	Scottish Premiership	10	0	2	0	—		—		12	0
Northampton Town (loan)	2021–22	League Two	10	0	—		—		—		10	0
Northampton Town	2022–23	League Two	18	2	0	0	1	0	0	0	19	2
Northampton Town	2023–24	League One	0	0	0	0	0	0	0	0	0	0
Northampton Town	2024–25	League One	21	1	1	0	1	0	2 (Note: Appearances in EFL Trophy)	0	25	1
Northampton Town	Total		49	3	1	0	2	0	2	0	54	3
Workington	2025–26	Northern Premier League; Premier Division	8	0	—		—		0	0	8	0
Port Vale	2025–26	League One	9	0	3	0	—		1	0	13	0
Buxton	2026–27	National League North	0	0	—		—		0	0	0	0
Career total			93	4	8	0	5	0	4	0	110	4

== Honours ==
Blackburn Rovers U23

- Lancashire Senior Cup: 2019

Northampton Town

- EFL League Two third-place promotion: 2022–23
