= Aaron Chapman =

English footballer (born 1990)

Personal information
- Full name: Aaron James Chapman
- Date of birth: 29 May 1990 (age 36)
- Place of birth: Rotherham, England
- Height: 6 ft 8 in (2.03 m)
- Position: Goalkeeper

Team information
- Current team: Clitheroe

Senior career*
Years	Team	Apps	(Gls)
2012–2013	Belper Town	46	(0)
2013–2016	Chesterfield	0	(0)
2014	→ Chester (loan)	16	(0)
2014	→ Accrington Stanley (loan)	3	(0)
2015	→ Bristol Rovers (loan)	5	(0)
2016–2018	Accrington Stanley	60	(0)
2018–2020	Peterborough United	32	(0)
2019–2020	→ Tranmere Rovers (loan)	6	(0)
2020–2021	Motherwell	6	(0)
2021–2022	Gillingham	18	(0)
2022–2023	Stevenage	0	(0)
2023	Scunthorpe United	7	(0)
2023	Retford United	0	(0)
2023–2024	Boston United	12	(0)
2024	Handsworth	0	(0)
2024	Worksop Town	7	(0)
2024–2025	Hereford	16	(0)
2025	Spalding United	21	(0)
2025–2026	King's Lynn Town	29	(0)
2026–	Clitheroe	0	(0)
- * Club domestic league appearances and goals as of 17:24, 14 May 2026 (UTC)

Aaron James Chapman (born 29 May 1990) is an English footballer who plays as a goalkeeper for Northern Premier League Division One West club Clitheroe.

== Career ==
=== Chesterfield ===
Chapman signed for Chesterfield from nearby non-league side Belper Town in the summer of 2013. He joined Chester on a one-month loan in February 2014. He made his professional debut on 2 September in the Football League Trophy match against Scunthorpe United, after coming off the bench to replace Tommy Lee in the seventh minute. On 23 September 2014, Chapman joined Accrington Stanley on a two-month loan deal. On 11 October, he had to be substituted in the closing stages of Accrington Stanley's 2–1 home defeat to Dagenham & Redbridge following an injury to his left foot. His loan spell was cut short and he returned to Chesterfield on 13 October, having played three games for Accrington. On 14 August 2015, Chapman joined Bristol Rovers on a one-month loan deal.

=== Accrington Stanley ===
In summer 2016, Chapman joined Accrington Stanley on a two-year contract. In an EFL Cup tie against Bradford City on 9 August 2016, Chapman came on as a substitute after Elliot Parish was sent off. The game went to a penalty shootout which Stanley won 11–10 and Chapman took and scored a penalty. Accrington Stanley won the League Two title in 2017–18, with Chapman also winning the League Two Golden Glove award, having kept 18 clean sheets in 45 league games. At the end of the 2017–18 season, he was offered a new contract by Accrington.

=== Peterborough United ===
On 15 May 2018, Chapman joined Peterborough United on a two-year deal to challenge the number 1 Jersey. He was transfer-listed by Peterborough United at the end of the 2018–19 season.

On 14 December 2019, Chapman joined Tranmere Rovers on a one-week emergency loan.

On 12 June 2020, Chapman was released by Peterborough, after playing 39 games for the club.

=== Motherwell ===
On 7 October 2020, Chapman was announced as a new signing by Scottish Premiership club Motherwell, with manager Stephen Robinson describing him as being "experienced cover and competition to Trevor" (Carson). He was released by the club at the end of the 2020–21 season.

=== Gillingham ===
On 6 July 2021, Chapman returned to England to join League One side Gillingham following his release from Motherwell. Chapman was released by the club following relegation to League Two at the end of the 2021–22 season.

=== Stevenage ===
On 23 May 2022, Chapman signed for League Two side Stevenage, playing under Steve Evans for a third time in the career with the manager having signed him at both Peterborough United and Gillingham.

=== Non-League career ===
In February 2023, Chapman signed for National League side Scunthorpe United after finding limited opportunities to play in Steve Evans' Stevenage side. He was released in December 2023 and signed for Northern Counties East League Division One side Retford United. Three weeks later, without Retford having played a game in the intervening period, he joined Boston United of the National League North. In March 2024, he joined Handsworth.

On 5 June 2024, Chapman joined National League North side Hereford. He made 19 appearances for The Bulls before signing for Southern League Premier Division Central club Spalding United for an undisclosed fee in January 2025.

In September 2025, Chapman joined National League North club King's Lynn Town.

On 14 May 2026, he joined Northern Premier League Division One West club Clitheroe.

== Personal life ==
On 2 April 2018, Chapman was involved in a car accident prior to Accrington's match against Notts County, and was taken to hospital as a result.

== Career statistics ==
As of end of 2025–26 season

Appearances and goals by club, season and competition
Club	Season	League			Domestic Cup		League Cup		Other		Total	
Club	Season	Division	Apps	Goals	Apps	Goals	Apps	Goals	Apps	Goals	Apps	Goals
Belper Town	2011–12	NPL Division One South	14	0	0	0	0	0	0	0	14	0
Belper Town	2012–13	NPL Division One South	32	0	5	0	1	0	6 (Note: Five appearances in FA Trophy, two appearances in Derbyshire Senior Cup, one appearance in NPL Division One South play-offs.)	0	44	0
Belper Town	Total		46	0	5	0	1	0	6	0	58	0
Chesterfield	2013–14	League Two	0	0	0	0	0	0	0	0	0	0
Chesterfield	2014–15	League One	0	0	0	0	0	0	1 (Note: Appearance(s) in Football League Trophy)	0	1	0
Chesterfield	2015–16	League One	0	0	0	0	0	0	0	0	0	0
Chesterfield	Total		0	0	0	0	0	0	1	0	1	0
Chester (loan)	2013–14	Conference Premier	16	0	0	0	—		0	0	16	0
Accrington Stanley (loan)	2014–15	League Two	3	0	0	0	0	0	0	0	3	0
Bristol Rovers (loan)	2015–16	League Two	5	0	0	0	0	0	0	0	5	0
Accrington Stanley	2016–17	League Two	15	0	2	0	1	0	2	0	20	0
Accrington Stanley	2017–18	League Two	45	0	2	0	1	0	2	0	50	0
Accrington Stanley	Total		60	0	4	0	2	0	4	0	70	0
Peterborough United	2018–19	League One	32	0	2	0	1	0	2	0	37	0
Peterborough United	2019–20	League One	0	0	0	0	0	0	2	0	2	0
Peterborough United	Total		32	0	2	0	1	0	4	0	39	0
Tranmere Rovers (loan)	2019–20	League One	6	0	1	0	0	0	0	0	7	0
Motherwell	2020–21	Scottish Premiership	6	0	0	0	1	0	0	0	7	0
Gillingham	2021–22	League One	18	0	2	0	2	0	3	0	25	0
Stevenage	2022–23	League Two	0	0	1	0	3	0	5	0	9	0
Scunthorpe United	2022–23	National League	7	0	0	0	—		0	0	7	0
Scunthorpe United	2023–24	National League North	0	0	0	0	—		0	0	0	0
Scunthorpe United	Total		7	0	0	0	0	0	0	0	7	0
Retford United	2023–24	NCEFL Division One	0	0	0	0	0	0	0	0	0	0
Boston United	2023–24	National League North	12	0	—		—		—		12	0
Handsworth	2023–24	NCEFL Premier Division	0	0	—		—		1 (Note: Appearance in Northern Counties East Football League Cup)	0	1	0
Worksop Town	2023–24	NPL Premier Division	7	0	—		—		1 (Note: Appearance in Northern Premier League Premier Division play-offs)	0	8	0
Hereford	2024–25	National League North	16	0	3	0	—		0	0	19	0
Spalding United	2024–25	SL Premier Central	18	0	—		—		—		18	0
Spalding United	2025–26	SL Premier Central	3	0	1	0	—		0	0	4	0
Spalding United	Total		21	0	1	0	0	0	0	0	22	0
King's Lynn Town	2025–26	National League North	29	0	0	0	—		1 (Note: Appearance(s) in FA Trophy)	0	30	0
Career total			284	0	19	0	10	0	26	0	339	0

== Honours ==
Accrington Stanley

- EFL League Two: 2017–18

Individual

- EFL League Two Golden Glove: 2017–18
