= Jordan Archer =

Footballer (born 1993)

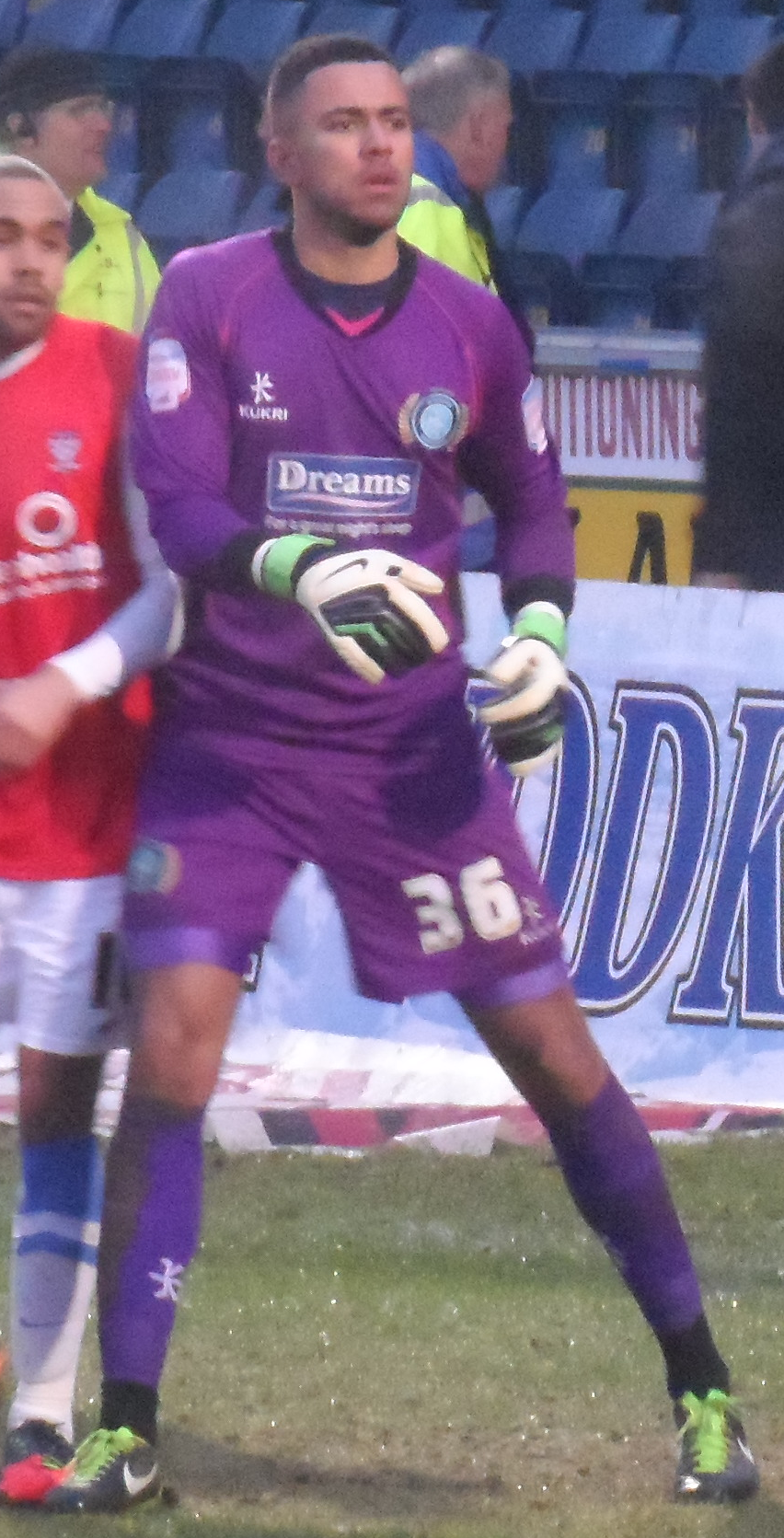
- Archer playing for Wycombe Wanderers in 2013

Personal information
- Full name: Jordan Gideon Archer
- Date of birth: 12 April 1993 (age 33)
- Place of birth: Walthamstow, England
- Height: 6 ft 3 in (1.91 m)
- Position: Goalkeeper

Youth career
- Charlton Athletic
- 2009–2011: Tottenham Hotspur

Senior career*
Years	Team	Apps	(Gls)
2011–2015	Tottenham Hotspur	0	(0)
2011	→ Harrow Borough (loan)		
2011–2012	→ Bishop's Stortford (loan)	25	(0)
2012–2013	→ Wycombe Wanderers (loan)	27	(0)
2014–2015	→ Northampton Town (loan)	13	(0)
2015	→ Millwall (loan)	0	(0)
2015–2019	Millwall	144	(0)
2019–2020	Oxford United	6	(0)
2020	Fulham	0	(0)
2020–2021	Motherwell	4	(0)
2021	Middlesbrough	5	(0)
2021–2024	Queens Park Rangers	0	(0)
2024–2026	Portsmouth	2	(0)

International career^{‡}
2010–2011	Scotland U19	5	(0)
2012	Scotland U20	1	(0)
2012–2014	Scotland U21	14	(0)
2018	Scotland	1	(0)
- * Club domestic league appearances and goals as of 11:24, 28 July 2026 (UTC) ‡ National team caps and goals as of 02:34, 30 May 2018 (UTC)

Jordan Gideon Archer (born 12 April 1993) is a professional footballer who last played as a goalkeeper for EFL Championship club Portsmouth. Born in England, he represented Scotland internationally, and made his sole senior international appearance in May 2018.

Archer has previously played for Tottenham Hotspur, Harrow Borough, Bishop's Stortford, Wycombe Wanderers, Northampton Town, Millwall, Oxford United, Fulham, Motherwell and Middlesbrough.

Archer has 2 children.

== Club career ==
Archer was born in Walthamstow, Greater London. He joined Tottenham Hotspur in 2009, having previously played for Charlton Athletic. He progressed his way through the academy and signed his first professional contract in July 2011, after a loan spell at Isthmian League side Harrow Borough in the previous season. In October 2011, Archer joined Conference North side Bishop's Stortford on loan for an initial month, which was later extended until the end of the season. On 26 September 2012, Archer joined League Two side Wycombe Wanderers on a seven-day emergency loan. In November, he rejoined Wycombe on loan until January 2013. In December, Tottenham agreed to extend the loan until the end of the 2012–13 season. On 21 February 2013, Archer signed a new contract with Tottenham, keeping him at the club until 2015. He was recalled by Tottenham Hotspur on 29 March 2013, and made the bench a day later in the game against Swansea City, as cover for Brad Friedel.

Archer was released by Tottenham Hotspur on 10 June 2015 at the end of his contract. He was signed by Millwall on a two-year contract later that month. Archer was awarded the League One Player of the Month Award for the month of February 2016. The same season, Archer was awarded Millwall Player of the Season Award for his performances during the 2015–16 campaign. Archer was released by Millwall at the end of the 2018–19 season.

On 6 December 2019, Archer signed for League One club Oxford United on a short-term deal as cover for first-choice keeper Simon Eastwood. He made his debut for the club the following day, picking up a clean sheet in a goalless draw with Shrewsbury Town. He departed in January 2020, having played eight games in all competitions.

He joined Fulham on a short-term deal on 16 January 2020 but was released at the end of the season.

Following his release, he started training with newly-relegated Championship club AFC Bournemouth, and played in their Betway Cup victory over West Ham United. However, on 11 September, newly-appointed Bournemouth manager Jason Tindall confirmed that Archer would not be retained in the squad.

On 28 October 2020, Archer signed a short-term deal until January 2021 with Scottish Premiership club Motherwell, after regular first-team goalkeeper Trevor Carson went down with a knee injury.

On 5 January 2021, Archer signed a short-term deal until the end of the season with EFL Championship club Middlesbrough. On 28 May 2021, it was announced that he would leave Middlesbrough at the end of the season, following the expiry of his contract.

On 7 July 2021, Archer joined EFL Championship club Queens Park Rangers on a two-year deal. After making just one appearance for QPR in the 2023–24 season, he joined Portsmouth in June 2024. On 15 May 2026, the club announced he would be leaving in the summer when his contract expired.

== International career ==
Walthamstow born Archer qualifies to play for Scotland via his Glaswegian mother. He represented Scotland at U19, U20 and U21 levels, and received his first ever call up to the senior side in August 2017. Archer made his first full international appearance on 29 May 2018, but was at fault in both goals with an inexperienced Scotland team losing 2–0 away to Peru.

== Career statistics ==
As of match played 16 August 2023

Appearances and goals by club, season and competition
Club	Season	League			FA Cup		League Cup		Other		Total	
Club	Season	Division	Apps	Goals	Apps	Goals	Apps	Goals	Apps	Goals	Apps	Goals
Tottenham Hotspur	2011–12	Premier League	0	0	0	0	0	0	0	0	0	0
Tottenham Hotspur	2012–13	Premier League	0	0	0	0	0	0	0	0	0	0
Tottenham Hotspur	2013–14	Premier League	0	0	0	0	0	0	0	0	0	0
Tottenham Hotspur	2014–15	Premier League	0	0	0	0	0	0	0	0	0	0
Tottenham Hotspur	Total		0	0	0	0	0	0	0	0	0	0
Bishop's Stortford (loan)	2011–12	Conference North	25	0	3	0	—		3 (Note: Appearances in FA Trophy)	0	31	0
Wycombe Wanderers (loan)	2012–13	League Two	27	0	1	0	0	0	1 (Note: Appearances in EFL Trophy)	0	29	0
Northampton Town (loan)	2014–15	League Two	13	0	1	0	1	0	1	0	16	0
Millwall (loan)	2014–15	Championship	0	0	0	0	0	0	—		0	0
Millwall	2015–16	League One	39	0	1	0	1	0	8 (Note: Three appearances in League One play-offs, five in EFL Trophy)	0	49	0
Millwall	2016–17	League One	36	0	5	0	1	0	3 (Note: Appearances in League One play-offs)	0	45	0
Millwall	2017–18	Championship	45	0	0	0	0	0	—		45	0
Millwall	2018–19	Championship	24	0	3	0	0	0	—		27	0
Millwall	Total		144	0	9	0	2	0	11	0	166	0
Oxford United	2019–20	League One	6	0	1	0	1	0	0	0	8	0
Fulham	2019–20	Championship	0	0	0	0	0	0	0	0	0	0
Motherwell	2020–21	Scottish Premiership	4	0	0	0	0	0	0	0	4	0
Middlesbrough	2020–21	Championship	5	0	1	0	0	0	0	0	6	0
Queens Park Rangers	2021–22	Championship	0	0	1	0	2	0	0	0	3	0
Queens Park Rangers	2022–23	Championship	0	0	0	0	0	0	0	0	0	0
Queens Park Rangers	2023–24	Championship	0	0	0	0	1	0	0	0	1	0
Queens Park Rangers	Total		0	0	1	0	3	0	0	0	4	0
Career total			224	0	17	0	7	0	16	0	264	0

== Honours ==
Millwall

- EFL League One play-offs: 2017

== See also ==
- List of Scotland international footballers born outside Scotland
