= Devante Cole =

English footballer (born 1995)

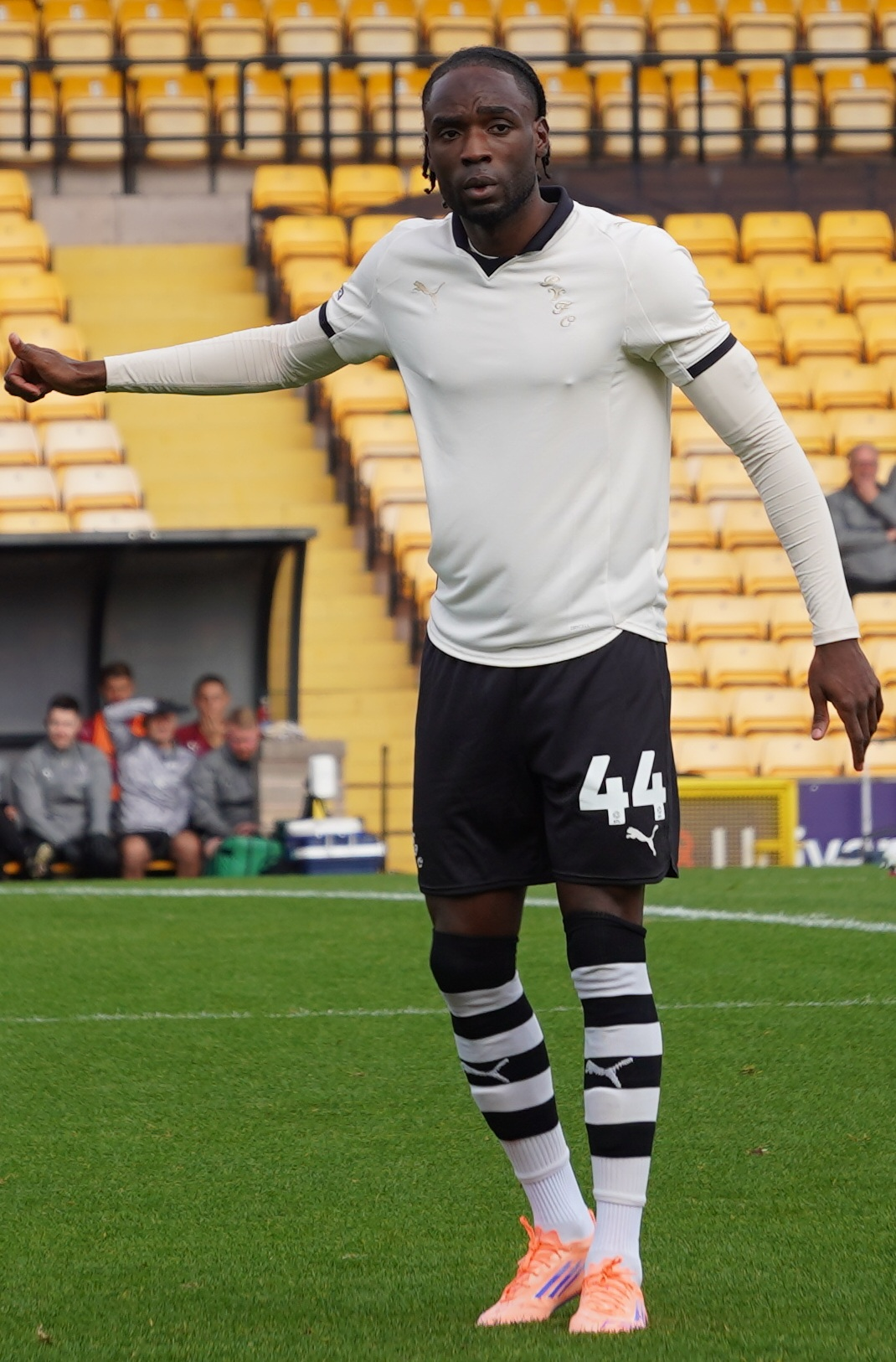
- Cole with Port Vale in 2025.

Personal information
- Full name: Devante Lavon Andrew Dewar-Cole
- Date of birth: 10 May 1995 (age 31)
- Place of birth: Alderley Edge, England
- Height: 6 ft 1 in (1.85 m)
- Position: Striker

Team information
- Current team: Luton Town
- Number: 44

Youth career
- 2003–2014: Manchester City

Senior career*
Years	Team	Apps	(Gls)
2014–2015	Manchester City	0	(0)
2014–2015	→ Barnsley (loan)	19	(5)
2015	→ Milton Keynes Dons (loan)	14	(3)
2015–2016	Bradford City	19	(5)
2016–2018	Fleetwood Town	77	(17)
2018–2020	Wigan Athletic	6	(0)
2018–2019	→ Burton Albion (loan)	13	(2)
2019–2020	→ Motherwell (loan)	19	(4)
2020	Doncaster Rovers	9	(0)
2020–2021	Motherwell	27	(11)
2021–2024	Barnsley	115	(34)
2024–2025	West Bromwich Albion	14	(0)
2025–2026	Port Vale	19	(6)
2026–	Luton Town	14	(1)

International career
2011	England U16	5	(2)
2011–2012	England U17	9	(3)
2012	England U18	1	(1)
2014	England U19	2	(1)
- * Club domestic league appearances and goals as of 13:48, 17 October 2026 (UTC)

Devante Lavon Andrew Dewar-Cole (born 10 May 1995) is an English professional footballer who plays as a striker for EFL League One club Luton Town. He has represented England up to under-19 level, though he received a call to represent Jamaica in November 2023.

Cole came through the Academy at Manchester City, playing on loan at Barnsley and Milton Keynes Dons in the 2014–15 season, helping the Dons to achieve promotion out of League One. In August 2015, he signed for Bradford City, then was sold to Fleetwood Town in January 2016. He scored 22 goals in 94 appearances in all competitions over two years. He joined Wigan Athletic in January 2018, though never established himself in the first XI. He spent time on loan at Burton Albion and Motherwell, before he was transferred to Doncaster Rovers in January 2020. He joined Motherwell on a permanent basis in October 2020 before rejoining another former club, Barnsley, in June 2021. He scored 36 goals in 129 league and cup appearances across three seasons. He signed with West Bromwich Albion in July 2024, though was unable to establish himself in the Championship and returned to League One with Port Vale in September 2025. He was sold to Luton Town four months later.

== Early and personal life ==
Cole was born in Alderley Edge on 10 May 1995. He is the son of the former Manchester United, Newcastle United and England striker Andy Cole. He stated that he is a different type of player to his father, who played in the same position, and that he wanted to make a name for himself. His paternal grandparents migrated to England from Jamaica in the 1960s; his grandfather worked as a miner. Cole attended the North Cestrian School in Altrincham, and at age 13 stated that he supported Manchester City and would like a career in computers if he did not make it as a footballer.

== Club career ==
=== Manchester City ===
Cole joined Premier League club Manchester City in April 2003, at the age of seven. He had previously spent a day training with city rivals Manchester United. His first involvement with the Manchester City first team came in July 2013 when he was selected for a pre-season friendly tour of South Africa, subsequently playing against SuperSport United. He featured heavily in the 2013–14 UEFA Youth League, scoring six goals and finishing as the second-highest scorer overall as City made a run to the quarter-final stage of the competition. In July 2014, youth team coach Patrick Vieira took his players off the pitch after an alleged racist incident in a friendly game, following a similar incident where Cole was racially abused by opposition players and supporters during a UEFA Youth League match against Atlético Madrid five months earlier.

On 19 August 2014, Cole signed on loan for Barnsley until 5 January. He made his professional debut the same day, appearing as a substitute in a League One game away to Coventry City. He scored his first goal for the club in his second appearance, a 4–1 win over Gillingham at Oakwell. He went on to score seven goals in 23 appearances, finding the net in the victory that marked manager Danny Wilson's 1,000th game in management. On 22 January 2015, Cole returned to League One on loan at Milton Keynes Dons until the end of the 2014–15 season. Dons manager Karl Robinson said he had wanted to bring the youngster to Stadium MK for "a long while". The Dons were promoted in second-place at the end of the season, with Cole contributing three goals in 14 games.

=== Bradford City ===
On 28 August 2015, Cole signed for Bradford City on a two-year deal, with the option of a third year, after being released by Manchester City. Bradford City manager Phil Parkinson praised Cole's pace. Before signing for them, he had been on trial with West Ham United and had been linked with a transfer to both Birmingham City and Preston North End. Manchester City retained a sell-on clause from the deal, believed to be 30%. Cole made his debut at Valley Parade a day later, appearing as a substitute and scoring in the fourth minute of injury-time to earn City a 1–0 victory over Port Vale. Manager Phil Parkinson praised Cole's potential development. New striker partner James Hanson also discussed their teamwork, and the improvement in Cole's all-round game was praised by Parkinson in October. He scored six goals in 24 games for the Bantams.

=== Fleetwood Town ===
On 22 January 2016, Cole joined League One rivals Fleetwood Town for an undisclosed fee (reported to be around £75,000), with forward Jamie Proctor moving the opposite way on loan, as manager Steven Pressley cited a need for "a number nine we can rely on to score goals". Cole said he felt the new club suited him better than Bradford had done. He did not score in his first 12 games for the Fishermen, though ended the 2015–16 season with a goal in each of the final two matches. He scored eight goals in 46 matches throughout the 2016–17 campaign, having spent some time out with a groin injury. This tally included a brace in an FA Cup win over Shrewsbury Town at Highbury Stadium. New head coach Uwe Rösler promised to judge him on his overall contribution to the team rather than his goal tally. Fleetwood qualified for the play-offs, losing to his former club Bradford City at the semi-final stage. Cole enjoyed a positive start to the 2017–18 season, scoring a brace in a win over AFC Wimbledon. He was nominated for the EFL September Goal of the Month for his strike at Portsmouth.

=== Wigan Athletic ===
On 31 January 2018, Cole was signed to Wigan Athletic on a two-and-half year deal for an undisclosed fee. Manager Paul Cook warned him that he faced a challenge even to make the squad due to the Latics' attacking strength. Wigan won the League One title at the end of the 2017–18 season, though Cole was limited to six substitute appearances.

On 30 August 2018, he returned to League One on loan at Burton Albion. He scored two goals in 16 games, though only six were league starts, as Burton manager Nigel Clough limited his playing time at the Pirelli Stadium due to the "fine form" of Lucas Akins, leading to Wigan recalling Cole back to the DW Stadium on 15 January.

On 2 July 2019, Cole joined Scottish Premiership club Motherwell on an initial six-month loan deal. He scored four goals in 19 games, and manager Stephen Robinson was keen to extend his loan until the end of the 2019–20 season, though was unsuccessful. Cole was instead linked with moves to both Hull City and Luton Town.

=== Doncaster Rovers ===
Cole was transferred to League One side Doncaster Rovers for an undisclosed fee on 27 January 2020 on an initial deal until the end of the season. Cole said he had come to the Keepmoat Stadium because he wanted "to play and score goals". He was released by Doncaster at the end of the 2019–20 season, having made five starts and four substitute appearances without finding the net.

=== Motherwell ===
On 2 October 2020, Cole returned to Motherwell on a contract until the end of the 2020–21 season. He scored a brace in a 3–1 win over Livingston at Fir Park on 6 March. Motherwell supporters voted him as the club's Player of the Month for March. He scored 12 goals in 31 matches to become the club's top scorer that season. New manager Graham Alexander hoped to persuade the striker to extend his contract beyond the summer.

=== Barnsley ===
On 8 June 2021, Cole signed a three-year contract with Barnsley. He scored his first goal in his second spell for the club on 24 October in a 3–2 loss to Sheffield United. This was his only goal in 24 Championship games as the club were relegated at the end of the 2021–22 campaign. Cole was initially sidelined by manager Markus Schopp and suggested that the partial comeback against Sheffield United was due to the players rather than Schopp. He was also dropped by new manager Poya Asbaghi.

On 17 December 2022, Cole scored a brace in a 2–0 home win over former club Burton Albion, earning himself the third-highest rating in that weekend's League One fixtures. He ended the 2022–23 campaign with 16 goals in 53 appearances, becoming the Tykes top-scorer and in the overall top ten in the division's top-scorer charts. He was also praised for his "work rate for the team and his pressing" by coach Martin Devaney. Cole in turn praised the new coaching staff, saying he had a "connection straight away" with head coach Michael Duff, in contrast to the club's previous managers. He was named as March's League One PFA Fans' Player of the Month. The season concluded with a defeat at Wembley Stadium to Sheffield Wednesday in the play-off final, with Cole substituted on 72 minutes when the game was still goalless.

On 5 August 2023, Cole scored a hat-trick in a 7–0 rout of Port Vale in what was Neill Collins's first match in charge. The following month, he was nominated for the League One Player of the Month award after scoring four goals in five games. On 24 October, he scored his tenth league goal of the campaign in a 3–0 victory over Shrewsbury Town, also providing an assist for Callum Styles, to secure himself the third-highest rating in that weekend's League One fixtures. Barnsley fans voted him as the club's Player of the Month for both September and October. Barnsley again qualified for the play-offs in 2024, though lost to Bolton Wanderers at the semi-final stage. Cole scored 18 goals from 49 appearances in the 2023–24 season, making him the club's top-scorer, though was dropped towards the end of the campaign as his goals dried up. The club announced in May that he would be released upon the expiry of his contract. Cole released an emotional statement to thank the club and state his regret that a League One promotion had not been achieved, saying that Barnsley would "always be a special place for me".

=== West Bromwich Albion ===
On 31 July 2024, Cole signed a two-year contract with Championship club West Bromwich Albion. Despite working under five different managers and interim managers — Carlos Corberán, Chris Brunt, Tony Mowbray, James Morrison, and Ryan Mason — he never established himself in the first XI, making 15 appearances from the bench and one cup start in the 2024–25 campaign. Corberán admitted that "we didn't sign him with the expectation to be the first XI number nine", though regretted that Cole had struggled for appearances due to the form of Josh Maja. Mowbray opted to play without a recognised striker rather than utilise Cole. Cole left the club after all parties came to an agreement on the remainder of his contract.

=== Port Vale ===
Cole signed for League One club Port Vale on 1 September 2025, with manager Darren Moore explaining that he was "a player that had plenty of interest from various clubs". He made his debut five days later and was named as the team's player of the match after securing an assist and scoring a goal in a 3–2 defeat to Leyton Orient at Vale Park, his first competitive match in seven months. This was rated as the fifth-best performance in League One that weekend. He scored three goals in his first five games and was voted as the club's Player of the Month for September. He was also nominated for both the PFA League One Fans' Player of the Month and EFL League One Player of the Month award. He scored eight goals in 23 appearances across all competitions during his four-month stay.

=== Luton Town ===
On 31 January 2026, Cole joined League One club Luton Town for an undisclosed fee. Manager Jack Wilshere described him as "an exciting signing". He appeared in the 2026 EFL Trophy final victory over Stockport County as a stoppage-time substitute.

== International career ==
Cole has represented England at under-16, under-17, under-18, and under-19 levels. He made his debut for the England under-19 team on 5 March 2014 in a friendly match against Turkey, starting the game and scoring the opening goal. On 29 May 2014, he made a further appearance from the start in a European Championship elite qualification match against Ukraine, which England lost to a deflected 94th-minute strike that eliminated them from the final tournament.

In November 2023, Cole was called up to the Jamaica national team for a set of 2023–24 CONCACAF Nations League matches. He was named in a provisional 60-man squad in February 2024.

== Style of play ==
Cole is a quick striker with natural finishing ability, who can also play out wide.

== Career statistics ==
As of match played 17 November 2026

Appearances and goals by club, season and competition
Club	Season	League			National cup (Note: Includes FA Cup, Scottish Cup)		League cup (Note: Includes EFL Cup, Scottish League Cup)		Other		Total	
Club	Season	Division	Apps	Goals	Apps	Goals	Apps	Goals	Apps	Goals	Apps	Goals
Manchester City	2014–15	Premier League	0	0	0	0	0	0	0	0	0	0
Barnsley (loan)	2014–15	League One	19	5	2	1	—		2 (Note: Appearance(s) in the Football League Trophy / EFL Trophy)	1	23	7
Milton Keynes Dons (loan)	2014–15	League One	14	3	—		—		—		14	3
Bradford City	2015–16	League One	19	5	4	1	—		1	0	24	6
Fleetwood Town	2015–16	League One	14	2	—		—		0	0	14	2
Fleetwood Town	2016–17	League One	35	5	6	2	1	0	4 (Note: 2 appearances and 1 goal in the EFL Trophy, and 2 appearances in the play-offs)	1	46	8
Fleetwood Town	2017–18	League One	28	10	5	2	1	0	0	0	34	12
Fleetwood Town	Total		77	17	11	4	2	0	4	1	94	22
Wigan Athletic	2017–18	League One	6	0	0	0	—		—		6	0
Wigan Athletic	2018–19	Championship	0	0	0	0	1	0	—		1	0
Wigan Athletic	2019–20	Championship	0	0	0	0	0	0	—		0	0
Wigan Athletic	Total		6	0	0	0	1	0	0	0	7	0
Burton Albion (loan)	2018–19	League One	13	2	1	0	0	0	2	0	16	2
Motherwell (loan)	2019–20	Scottish Premiership	19	4	0	0	2	0	—		21	4
Doncaster Rovers	2019–20	League One	9	0	—		—		—		9	0
Motherwell	2020–21	Scottish Premiership	27	11	3	1	1	0	0	0	31	12
Barnsley	2021–22	Championship	24	1	2	1	1	0	—		27	2
Barnsley	2022–23	League One	45	15	3	1	2	0	3 (Note: Appearance(s) in the play-offs)	0	53	16
Barnsley	2023–24	League One	46	18	1	0	0	0	2	0	49	18
Barnsley	Total		115	34	6	2	3	0	5	0	129	36
West Bromwich Albion	2024–25	Championship	14	0	1	0	1	0	—		16	0
Port Vale	2025–26	League One	19	6	3	2	1	0	0	0	23	8
Luton Town	2025–26	League One	12	0	—		—		2	0	14	0
Luton Town	2026–27	League One	2	1	1	0	1	0	3	3	7	4
Luton Town	Total		14	1	1	0	1	0	5	3	21	4
Career total			365	88	32	11	12	0	19	5	428	104

== Honours ==
Milton Keynes Dons

- Football League One second-place promotion: 2014–15

Luton Town

- EFL Trophy: 2025–26
