= Henry Robinson (footballer) =

English footballer

Personal information
- Full name: Henry Robinson
- Date of birth: c. 1909
- Place of birth: Chilton, England
- Height: 5 ft 11 in (1.80 m)
- Position: Outside left

Youth career
- Chilton School
- Kirk Merrington
- Shildon Athletic
- Chilton Colliery Railway

Senior career*
Years	Team	Apps	(Gls)
1929–1930	Sunderland	0	(0)
1930–1931	Nelson	20	(3)
1931	Hartlepools United	6	(1)
1931–1932	Spennymoor United		
1932	Darlington	1	(0)
1932–1933	Crook Town		
1933–19??	Horden Colliery Welfare		
- * Club domestic league appearances and goals

Henry Robinson (c. 1909 – after 1933) was an English professional footballer who played as an outside forward. He grew up in Chilton, County Durham, and as a youth played for the Chilton School team. Robinson went on to assist Kirk Merrington, Shildon Athletic and Chilton Colliery Railway before joining Football League First Division side Sunderland on amateur terms in September 1929. Although he was awarded a professional contract the following month, he failed to break into the first team and spent the entire season playing with the reserves in the North Eastern League.

Robinson left Sunderland in May 1930 and was signed by Third Division North club Nelson. He made his senior debut for Nelson in the opening match of the 1930–31 season, a 4–5 defeat away at Rochdale on 30 August 1930. Robinson scored his first Football League goal on 20 September 1930, netting his side's first in a 2–2 draw with New Brighton at Seedhill. He was on the scoresheet again four games later in the 2–4 defeat to Crewe Alexandra. Robinson kept his place in the first team for most of the first half of the season, although Archie Howarth and Tom Carmedy also played at outside-left occasionally. On 20 December 1930 he scored his third goal of the season, a penalty kick, in the 2–0 win against Wrexham. Nelson progressed to the second round of the FA Cup in the 1930–31 campaign and Robinson played in all three matches, scoring once. He made his final appearance for the club on 24 January 1931 as Nelson were beaten 0–2 at New Brighton.

In February 1931, Robinson was released by Nelson along with several other players because of financial problems at the club. He spent the remainder of the season with Hartlepools United, where he scored one goal in six league games. In the summer of 1931 he returned to the North Eastern League with Spennymoor United. After spending the 1931–32 season with the County Durham club, Robinson was offered a short-term contract by Darlington. He signed for the Quakers in August 1932, marking a return to the Third Division North, but played only one first-team game before leaving the club the following month. Robinson subsequently had spells in non-League football with Crook Town and Horden Colliery Welfare before retiring from football.
