= Harold Robinson (baseball) =

American baseball player

- Shortstop

Negro league baseball debut
- 1940, for the Philadelphia Stars

Last appearance
- 1940, for the Philadelphia Stars

Teams
- Philadelphia Stars (1940)

Harold Robinson is an American former Negro league shortstop who played in the 1940s.

Robinson played for the Philadelphia Stars in 1940. In four recorded games, he posted one hit in seven plate appearances.
