= Henry Robinson (New South Wales cricketer) =

Australian cricketer

Personal information
- Born: 11 March 1864; Watsons Bay, New South Wales, Australia
- Died: 24 March 1931 (aged 67); Mascot, New South Wales, Australia

Domestic team information
- Years: Team
- 1889 - 1893: New South Wales
- Source: ESPNcricinfo, 23 January 2017

Henry Robinson (11 March 1864 – 24 March 1931) was an Australian cricketer. He played six first-class matches for New South Wales between 1889/90 and 1892/93.
