= Henry Robinson (Yorkshire cricketer) =

English cricketer

Henry Robinson (12 May 1858 – 14 December 1909) was an English first-class cricketer, who played one match for Yorkshire County Cricket Club against Derbyshire, at the County Ground, Derby, in 1879. Batting down the order, Robinson scored 4 and 1. He bowled ten overs and took one wicket for 20 runs, but Derbyshire ran out winners by an innings and two runs.

Robinson died in December 1909, at the age of 51.
