= Henry Robinson (Nottinghamshire cricketer) =

English cricketer

Personal information
- Full name: Henry Robinson
- Born: 13 November 1863; Nottingham, Nottinghamshire, England
- Died: 24 September 1938 (aged 74); Nottingham, Nottinghamshire, England
- Batting: Unknown

Domestic team information
- Years: Team
- 1889: Nottinghamshire

Career statistics
Competition	First-class
Matches	1
Runs scored	0
Batting average	0.00
100s/50s	–/–
Top score	0
Balls bowled	–
Wickets	–
Bowling average	–
5 wickets in innings	–
10 wickets in match	–
Best bowling	–
Catches/stumpings	–/–
- Source: Cricinfo, 20 February 2013

Henry Robinson (13 November 1863 – 24 September 1938) was an English cricketer. Robinson's batting style is unknown. He was born at Nottingham, Nottinghamshire.

Robinson made a single first-class appearance for Nottinghamshire against the Marylebone Cricket Club at Lord's in 1889. In a match which the Marylebone Cricket Club won by 7 wickets, he was dismissed in both Nottinghamshire's first and second-innings for duck's by Dick Pougher.
