= Harry Robinson (footballer) =

Northern Irish footballer

Personal information
- Full name: Harry David Robinson
- Date of birth: 26 September 2000 (age 26)
- Place of birth: Preston, England
- Height: 5 ft 8 in (1.73 m)
- Position: Midfielder

Team information
- Current team: Clyde

Youth career
- –2015: Ridgeway Rovers
- 2014–2015: Burnley
- 2015–2016: Birmingham City

Senior career*
Years	Team	Apps	(Gls)
2016–2017	Glenavon	1	(0)
2017–2020	Oldham Athletic	1	(0)
2019–2020	→ Crusaders (loan)	1	(0)
2020–2021	Motherwell	1	(0)
2020	→ Queen of the South (loan)	3	(0)
2021–	Clyde		

International career^{‡}
2015	Northern Ireland U15	2	(0)
2015–2016	Northern Ireland U16	7	(2)
2018–	Northern Ireland U19	1	(1)
2019–	Northern Ireland U21	1	(0)
- * Club domestic league appearances and goals as of 03:20, 2 February 2021 (UTC) ‡ National team caps and goals as of 17:00, 2 January 2021 (UTC)

Harry David Robinson (born 26 September 2000) is a Northern Irish footballer who plays as a midfielder for Clyde. Robinson has previously played for Motherwell, Glenavon, Oldham Athletic and also Crusaders and Queen of the South with loan spells.

== Club career ==
Robinson started his career with Ridgeway Rovers. After playing for Glenavon, he signed for Oldham Athletic in 2017.

In August 2019, he joined NIFL Premiership club Crusaders on loan until January 2020. He was released by Oldham in January 2020.

On 9 March 2020, Robinson signed for Motherwell on a short-term contract for the remainder of the 2019–20 season, having spent time training with the club and playing for their reserve side.

On 18 September 2020, Robinson was sent out on a season-long loan to Dumfries club Queen of the South. On 2 February 2021, his loan spell at the Doonhamers was ended due to a persistent injury, as he returned to Fir Park earlier than planned.

In 2021, he joined Clyde on a 1-year contract.

== International career ==
Robinson has played for Northern Ireland at under-15, under-16, under-18 and under-19 level.

== Career statistics ==
=== Club ===
As of 9 January 2021

Appearances and goals by club, season and competition
Club	Season	League			National Cup		League Cup		Other		Total	
Club	Season	Division	Apps	Goals	Apps	Goals	Apps	Goals	Apps	Goals	Apps	Goals
Glenavon	2015–16	NIFL Premiership	1	0	0	0	0	0	0	0	1	0
Glenavon	2016–17	NIFL Premiership	0	0	0	0	0	0	0	0	0	0
Glenavon	Total		1	0	0	0	0	0	0	0	1	0
Oldham Athletic	2018–19	EFL League Two	1	0	0	0	0	0	0	0	1	0
Oldham Athletic	2019–20	EFL League Two	0	0	0	0	0	0	0	0	0	0
Oldham Athletic	Total		1	0	0	0	0	0	0	0	1	0
Crusaders (loan)	2019–20	NIFL Premiership	1	0	0	0	0	0	1	0	2	0
Motherwell	2019–20	Scottish Premiership	0	0	0	0	0	0	0	0	0	0
Motherwell	2020–21	Scottish Premiership	1	0	0	0	0	0	1 (Note: Appearances in the UEFA Europa League)	0	2	0
Motherwell	Total		1	0	0	0	0	0	1	0	2	0
Queen of the South (loan)	2020–21	Scottish Championship	3	0	0	0	2	0	0	0	5	0
Career total			7	0	0	0	2	0	2	0	11	0
